= 1970 United States House of Representatives elections in South Carolina =

- November 3, 1970

All 6 South Carolina seats to the United States House of Representatives
	Majority party	Minority party
Party	Democratic	Republican
Last election	5	1
Seats won	5	1
Seat change	Steady	Steady
Popular vote	309,487	115,531
Percentage	72.49%	27.06%
Swing	▲6.20%	▼5.42%
District results
Democratic
60–70%
70–80%
90–100%
Republican
50–60%

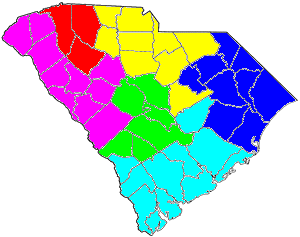
South Carolina congressional districts, 1962 to 1970 1st district 2nd district 3rd district 4th district 5th district 6th district

The 1970 United States House of Representatives elections in South Carolina were held on November 3, 1970, to select six Representatives for two-year terms from the state of South Carolina. The primary elections were held on June 9 and the runoff elections were held two weeks later on June 23. All five incumbents who ran were re-elected and the open seat in the 2nd district was retained by the Republicans. The composition of the state delegation remained five Democrats and one Republican.

== 1st congressional district ==
Incumbent Democratic Congressman L. Mendel Rivers of the 1st congressional district, in office since 1941, was unopposed in his bid for re-election.

=== General election results ===
South Carolina's 1st congressional district election results, 1970
Party	Candidate	Votes	%	±%
Democratic	L. Mendel Rivers (incumbent)	63,891	100.0	0.0
Majority		63,891	100.0	0.0
Turnout		63,891		
Democratic hold				

== 2nd congressional district ==
Incumbent Republican Congressman Albert Watson of the 2nd congressional district, in office since 1963, chose to run for Governor instead of re-election. Floyd Spence, a Republican state senator who had unsuccessfully run for the seat in the 1962 elections, defeated Democratic challenger Heyward McDonald.

=== General election results ===
South Carolina's 2nd congressional district election results, 1970
Party	Candidate	Votes	%	±%
Republican	Floyd Spence	48,093	53.1	−4.5
Democratic	Heyward McDonald	42,005	46.4	+4.0
Independent	Donald Cole	486	0.5	+0.5
Majority		6,088	6.7	−8.5
Turnout		90,584		
Republican hold				

== 3rd congressional district ==
Incumbent Democratic Congressman William Jennings Bryan Dorn of the 3rd congressional district, in office since 1951, defeated Republican challenger Grady Ballard.

=== General election results ===
South Carolina's 3rd congressional district election results, 1970
Party	Candidate	Votes	%	±%
Democratic	William J.B. Dorn (incumbent)	60,708	75.2	+9.1
Republican	Grady Ballard	19,981	24.8	−6.9
Majority		40,727	50.4	+16.0
Turnout		80,689		
Democratic hold				

== 4th congressional district ==
Incumbent Democratic Congressman James R. Mann of the 4th congressional district, in office since 1969, was unopposed in his bid for re-election.

=== General election results ===
South Carolina's 4th congressional district election results, 1970
Party	Candidate	Votes	%	±%
Democratic	James R. Mann (incumbent)	52,175	100.0	+38.8
Majority		52,175	100.0	+77.6
Turnout		52,175		
Democratic hold				

== 5th congressional district ==
Incumbent Democratic Congressman Thomas S. Gettys of the 5th congressional district, in office since 1964, defeated Republican challenger B. Leonard Phillips.

=== General election results ===
South Carolina's 5th congressional district election results, 1970
Party	Candidate	Votes	%	±%
Democratic	Thomas S. Gettys (incumbent)	43,712	65.9	−8.8
Republican	B. Leonard Phillips	21,911	33.1	+11.3
Independent	James B. Sumner	688	1.0	−2.5
Majority		21,801	32.8	−20.1
Turnout		66,311		
Democratic hold				

== 6th congressional district ==
Incumbent Democratic Congressman John L. McMillan of the 6th congressional district, in office since 1939, won the Democratic primary and defeated Republican Edward B. Baskin in the general election.

=== Democratic primary ===
Democratic primary
Candidate	Votes	%
John L. McMillan	26,192	49.6
Claude L. Stephens	11,534	21.8
Bill R. Craig	11,047	20.9
Olin Sansbury Jr.	4,042	7.7

Democratic primary runoff
Candidate	Votes	%	±%
John L. McMillan	46,030	71.2	+21.6
Claude L. Stephens	18,620	28.8	+7.0

=== General election results ===
South Carolina's 6th congressional district election results, 1970
Party	Candidate	Votes	%	±%
Democratic	John L. McMillan (incumbent)	46,926	64.1	+5.8
Republican	Edward B. Baskin	25,546	34.9	−5.0
Independent	Charles H. Smith	773	1.0	−0.8
Majority		21,380	29.2	+10.8
Turnout		73,245		
Democratic hold				

== See also ==
- United States House elections, 1970
- South Carolina gubernatorial election, 1970
- South Carolina's congressional districts
