= 1948 United States House of Representatives elections in South Carolina =

- November 2, 1948

All 6 South Carolina seats to the United States House of Representatives
	Majority party
Party	Democratic
Last election	6
Seats won	6
Seat change	Steady
Popular vote	133,730
Percentage	95.08%
District results
Democratic
80–90%
90–100%

The 1948 United States House of Representatives elections in South Carolina were held on November 2, 1948, to select six Representatives for two-year terms from the state of South Carolina. Four incumbents were re-elected, but John J. Riley of the 2nd congressional district was defeated in the Democratic primary by Hugo S. Sims, Jr. The seat remained with the Democrats along with the open seat in the 3rd congressional district and the composition of the state delegation remained solely Democratic.

== 1st congressional district ==
Incumbent Democratic Congressman L. Mendel Rivers of the 1st congressional district, in office since 1941, defeated Republican challenger W.T. Baggott.

=== General election results ===
South Carolina's 1st congressional district election results, 1948
Party	Candidate	Votes	%	±%
Democratic	L. Mendel Rivers (incumbent)	24,527	89.1	−10.4
Republican	W.T. Baggott	2,987	10.9	+10.9
No party	Write-Ins	13	0.0	−0.5
Majority		21,540	78.2	−20.8
Turnout		27,527		
Democratic hold				

== 2nd congressional district ==
Incumbent Democratic Congressman John J. Riley of the 2nd congressional district, in office since 1945, was defeated in the Democratic primary by Hugo S. Sims, Jr. who also defeated Republican W. Edward Moore in the general election.

=== Democratic primary ===
Democratic primary
Candidate	Votes	%
Hugo S. Sims, Jr.	33,747	53.7
John J. Riley	29,045	46.3

=== General election results ===
South Carolina's 2nd congressional district election results, 1948
Party	Candidate	Votes	%	±%
Democratic	Hugo S. Sims, Jr.	27,677	96.4	−2.2
Republican	W. Edward Moore	1,020	3.6	+3.6
Majority		26,657	92.8	−4.4
Turnout		28,697		
Democratic hold				

== 3rd congressional district ==
Incumbent Democratic Congressman W.J. Bryan Dorn of the 3rd congressional district, in office since 1947, chose to not seek re-election and instead made an unsuccessful run for Senator. James Butler Hare won the Democratic primary and defeated Republican D.F. Merill in the general election.

=== Democratic primary ===
Democratic primary
Candidate	Votes	%
James Butler Hare	26,007	42.6
John C. Taylor	17,319	28.4
R.L. "Buck" Gamble	12,484	20.4
Leon Rice	5,270	8.6

Democratic primary runoff
Candidate	Votes	%	±%
James Butler Hare	38,266	65.3	+22.7
John C. Taylor	20,291	34.7	+6.3

=== General election results ===
South Carolina's 3rd congressional district election results, 1948
Party	Candidate	Votes	%	±%
Democratic	James Butler Hare	19,181	97.8	−2.1
Republican	D.F. Merill	421	2.2	+2.2
No party	Write-Ins	6	0.0	−0.1
Majority		18,760	95.6	−4.2
Turnout		19,608		
Democratic hold				

== 4th congressional district ==
Incumbent Democratic Congressman Joseph R. Bryson of the 4th congressional district, in office since 1939, defeated Republican challenger James B. Gaston.

=== General election results ===
South Carolina's 4th congressional district election results, 1948
Party	Candidate	Votes	%	±%
Democratic	Joseph R. Bryson (incumbent)	26,098	94.9	−4.7
Republican	James B. Gaston	1,410	5.1	+5.1
Majority		24,688	89.8	−9.4
Turnout		27,508		
Democratic hold				

== 5th congressional district ==
Incumbent Democratic Congressman James P. Richards of the 5th congressional district, in office since 1933, defeated Roy C. Cobb in the Democratic primary and Republican J.D. Hambright in the general election.

=== Democratic primary ===
Democratic primary
Candidate	Votes	%
James P. Richards	26,268	60.6
Roy C. Cobb	17,070	39.4

=== General election results ===
South Carolina's 5th congressional district election results, 1948
Party	Candidate	Votes	%	±%
Democratic	James P. Richards (incumbent)	14,544	97.1	−2.9
Republican	J.D. Hambright	428	2.9	+2.9
Majority		14,116	94.2	−5.8
Turnout		14,972		
Democratic hold				

== 6th congressional district ==
Incumbent Democratic Congressman John L. McMillan of the 6th congressional district, in office since 1939, defeated Republican challenger F.L. Bradfield.

=== General election results ===
South Carolina's 6th congressional district election results, 1948
Party	Candidate	Votes	%	±%
Democratic	John L. McMillan (incumbent)	21,703	97.1	+0.2
Republican	F.L. Bradfield	639	2.9	+2.9
Majority		21,064	94.2	−0.3
Turnout		22,342		
Democratic hold				

== See also ==
- United States House of Representatives elections, 1948
- United States Senate election in South Carolina, 1948
- South Carolina's congressional districts
