= 1950 United States House of Representatives elections in South Carolina =

- November 7, 1950

All 6 South Carolina seats to the United States House of Representatives
	Majority party
Party	Democratic
Last election	6
Seats won	6
Seat change	Steady
Popular vote	50,371
Percentage	99.96%
District results
Democratic
90–100%

The 1950 United States House of Representatives elections in South Carolina were held on November 7, 1950, to select six Representatives for two-year terms from the state of South Carolina. Four incumbents were re-elected, but Hugo S. Sims, Jr. of the 2nd congressional district and James Butler Hare of the 3rd congressional district were defeated in the Democratic primaries. The seats were retained by the Democrats and the composition of the state delegation remained solely Democratic.

== 1st congressional district ==
Incumbent Democratic Congressman L. Mendel Rivers of the 1st congressional district, in office since 1941, defeated A.J. Clement in the Democratic primary and was unopposed in the general election.

=== Democratic primary ===
Democratic primary
Candidate	Votes	%
L. Mendel Rivers	44,474	85.8
A.J. Clement	7,376	14.2

=== General election results ===
South Carolina's 1st congressional district election results, 1950
Party	Candidate	Votes	%	±%
Democratic	L. Mendel Rivers (incumbent)	6,753	100.0	+10.9
No party	Write-Ins	3	0.0	0.0
Majority		6,750	100.0	+21.8
Turnout		6,756		
Democratic hold				

== 2nd congressional district ==
Incumbent Democratic Congressman Hugo S. Sims, Jr. of the 2nd congressional district, in office since 1949, was defeated in the Democratic primary by John J. Riley who was unopposed in the general election.

=== Democratic primary ===
Democratic primary
Candidate	Votes	%
John J. Riley	29,066	46.0
Hugo S. Sims, Jr.	28,722	45.4
Sam B. Doughton	5,443	8.6

Democratic primary runoff
Candidate	Votes	%	±%
John J. Riley	28,864	60.3	+14.3
Hugo S. Sims, Jr.	19,041	39.7	-5.7

=== General election results ===
South Carolina's 2nd congressional district election results, 1950
Party	Candidate	Votes	%	±%
Democratic	John J. Riley	9,747	100.0	+3.6
No party	Write-Ins	3	0.0	0.0
Majority		9,744	100.0	+7.2
Turnout		9,750		
Democratic hold				

== 3rd congressional district ==
Incumbent Democratic Congressman James Butler Hare of the 3rd congressional district, in office since 1949, was defeated in the Democratic primary by W.J. Bryan Dorn who was unopposed in the general election.

=== Democratic primary ===
Democratic primary
Candidate	Votes	%
W.J. Bryan Dorn	24,010	44.8
James Butler Hare	22,837	42.6
Theo H. Vaughn	4,806	9.0
S.T. Heyward	1,923	3.6

Democratic primary runoff
Candidate	Votes	%	±%
W.J. Bryan Dorn	23,581	54.3	+9.5
James Butler Hare	19,840	45.7	+3.1

=== General election results ===
South Carolina's 3rd congressional district election results, 1950
Party	Candidate	Votes	%	±%
Democratic	W.J. Bryan Dorn	8,126	100.0	+2.2
No party	Write-Ins	4	0.0	0.0
Majority		8,122	100.0	+4.4
Turnout		8,130		
Democratic hold				

== 4th congressional district ==
Incumbent Democratic Congressman Joseph R. Bryson of the 4th congressional district, in office since 1939, defeated Matthew Poliakoff in the Democratic primary and was unopposed in the general election.

=== Democratic primary ===
Democratic primary
Candidate	Votes	%
Joseph R. Bryson	48,000	73.1
Matthew Poliakoff	17,668	26.9

=== General election results ===
South Carolina's 4th congressional district election results, 1950
Party	Candidate	Votes	%	±%
Democratic	Joseph R. Bryson (incumbent)	7,976	99.9	+5.0
No party	Write-Ins	5	0.1	+0.1
Majority		7,971	99.8	+10.0
Turnout		7,981		
Democratic hold				

== 5th congressional district ==
Incumbent Democratic Congressman James P. Richards of the 5th congressional district, in office since 1933, was unopposed in his bid for re-election.

=== General election results ===
South Carolina's 5th congressional district election results, 1950
Party	Candidate	Votes	%	±%
Democratic	James P. Richards (incumbent)	10,648	100.0	+2.9
No party	Write-Ins	1	0.0	0.0
Majority		10,647	100.0	+5.8
Turnout		10,649		
Democratic hold				

== 6th congressional district ==
Incumbent Democratic Congressman John L. McMillan of the 6th congressional district, in office since 1939, was unopposed in his bid for re-election.

=== General election results ===
South Carolina's 6th congressional district election results, 1950
Party	Candidate	Votes	%	±%
Democratic	John L. McMillan (incumbent)	7,131	100.0	+2.9
No party	Write-Ins	3	0.0	0.0
Majority		7,128	100.0	+5.8
Turnout		7,134		
Democratic hold				

== See also ==
- 1950 United States House of Representatives elections
- 1950 United States Senate election in South Carolina
- 1950 South Carolina gubernatorial election
- South Carolina's congressional districts
