= 1944 United States House of Representatives elections in South Carolina =

- November 7, 1944

All 6 South Carolina seats to the United States House of Representatives
	Majority party
Party	Democratic
Last election	6
Seats won	6
Seat change	Steady
District results
Democratic
90–100%

The 1944 United States House of Representatives elections in South Carolina were held on November 7, 1944, to select six Representatives for two-year terms from the state of South Carolina. All five incumbents who ran were re-elected and the open seat in the 2nd congressional district was retained by the Democrats. The composition of the state delegation thus remained solely Democratic.

== 1st congressional district ==
Incumbent Democratic Congressman L. Mendel Rivers of the 1st congressional district, in office since 1941, defeated Republican challenger O.H. Wilcox.

=== General election results ===
South Carolina's 1st congressional district election results, 1944
Party	Candidate	Votes	%	±%
Democratic	L. Mendel Rivers (incumbent)	15,326	92.8	−7.2
Republican	O.H. Wilcox	1,190	7.2	+7.2
No party	Write-Ins	1	0.0	0.0
Majority		14,136	85.6	−14.4
Turnout		16,517		
Democratic hold				

== 2nd congressional district special election ==
Incumbent Democratic Congressman Hampton P. Fulmer of the 2nd congressional district died on October 19, 1944, and a special election was called for November 7 to be held simultaneously with the regular election. Fulmer's widow, Willa L. Fulmer, was unopposed in the special election to serve out the remainder of the term.

=== General election results ===
South Carolina's 2nd congressional district special election results, 1944
Party	Candidate	Votes	%	±%
Democratic	Willa L. Fulmer	7,943	100.0	0.0
Majority		7,943	100.0	0.0
Turnout		7,943		
Democratic hold				

== 2nd congressional district ==
Willa L. Fulmer, who ran in the special election for the 2nd congressional district, was not also a contestant for the regular election to the 79th Congress. John J. Riley won the Democratic primary on November 1 and defeated Republican H.G. Willingham in the general election.

=== Democratic primary ===
Democratic primary
Candidate	Votes	%
John J. Riley	11,772	52.2
Joe E. Berry	8,161	36.2
D.M. Winter	2,607	11.6

=== General election results ===
South Carolina's 2nd congressional district election results, 1944
Party	Candidate	Votes	%	±%
Democratic	John J. Riley	19,342	98.0	−2.0
Republican	H.G. Willingham	398	2.0	+2.0
No party	Write-Ins	1	0.0	0.0
Majority		18,944	96.0	−4.0
Turnout		19,741		
Democratic hold				

== 3rd congressional district ==
Incumbent Democratic Congressman Butler B. Hare of the 3rd congressional district, in office since 1939, won the Democratic primary and defeated Republican D.F. Merrill in the general election.

=== Democratic primary ===
Democratic primary
Candidate	Votes	%
Butler B. Hare	26,320	55.4
R.L. "Buck" Gamble	14,484	30.5
Leon Rice	6,692	14.1

=== General election results ===
South Carolina's 3rd congressional district election results, 1944
Party	Candidate	Votes	%	±%
Democratic	Butler B. Hare (incumbent)	13,105	97.0	−3.0
Republican	D.F. Merrill	404	3.0	+3.0
No party	Write-Ins	3	0.0	0.0
Majority		12,701	94.0	−6.0
Turnout		13,512		
Democratic hold				

== 4th congressional district ==
Incumbent Democratic Congressman Joseph R. Bryson of the 4th congressional district, in office since 1939, defeated Republican challenger J.G. Jones.

=== General election results ===
South Carolina's 4th congressional district election results, 1944
Party	Candidate	Votes	%	±%
Democratic	Joseph R. Bryson (incumbent)	20,988	95.7	−4.3
Republican	J.G. Jones	934	4.3	+4.3
Majority		20,054	91.4	−8.6
Turnout		21,922		
Democratic hold				

== 5th congressional district ==
Incumbent Democratic Congressman James P. Richards of the 5th congressional district, in office since 1933, defeated Republican challenger W.I. Bost.

=== General election results ===
South Carolina's 5th congressional district election results, 1944
Party	Candidate	Votes	%	±%
Democratic	James P. Richards (incumbent)	14,435	98.1	−1.9
Republican	W.I. Bost	278	1.9	+1.9
Majority		14,157	96.2	−3.8
Turnout		14,713		
Democratic hold				

== 6th congressional district ==
Incumbent Democratic Congressman John L. McMillan of the 6th congressional district, in office since 1939, defeated Republican challenger C.B. Ruffin.

=== General election results ===
South Carolina's 6th congressional district election results, 1944
Party	Candidate	Votes	%	±%
Democratic	John L. McMillan (incumbent)	14,164	98.0	−2.0
Republican	C.B. Ruffin	291	2.0	+2.0
No party	Write-Ins	2	0.0	0.0
Majority		13,873	96.0	−4.0
Turnout		14,457		
Democratic hold				

== See also ==
- United States House of Representatives elections, 1944
- United States Senate election in South Carolina, 1944
- South Carolina's congressional districts
