= 1962 United States House of Representatives elections in South Carolina =

- November 6, 1962

All 6 South Carolina seats to the United States House of Representatives
	Majority party	Minority party
Party	Democratic	Republican
Last election	6	0
Seats won	6	0
Seat change	Steady	Steady
Popular vote	225,714	36,808
Percentage	85.98%	14.02%
Swing	▼13.99%	▲14.02%
District results
Democratic
50–60%
90–100%

The 1962 United States House of Representatives elections in South Carolina were held on November 6, 1962, to select six Representatives for two-year terms from the state of South Carolina. The primary elections were held on June 12 and the runoff elections were held two weeks later on June 26. All five incumbents who ran were re-elected and the open seat in the 2nd congressional district was retained by the Democrats. The composition of the state delegation thus remained solely Democratic.

== 1st congressional district ==
Incumbent Democratic Congressman L. Mendel Rivers of the 1st congressional district, in office since 1941, was unopposed in his bid for re-election.

=== General election results ===
South Carolina's 1st congressional district election results, 1962
Party	Candidate	Votes	%	±%
Democratic	L. Mendel Rivers (incumbent)	39,176	100.0	0.0
Majority		39,176	100.0	0.0
Turnout		39,176		
Democratic hold				

== 2nd congressional district special election ==
Incumbent Democratic Congressman John J. Riley of the 2nd congressional district died on January 1, 1962. A special election was called and his widow, Corinne Boyd Riley, won the Democratic primary on February 13 and the special election on April 10 to serve out the remainder of the term.

=== Democratic primary ===
Democratic primary
Candidate	Votes	%
Corinne Boyd Riley	10,277	69.0
Martha Fitzgerald	4,607	31.0

=== General election results ===
South Carolina's 2nd congressional district special election results, 1962
Party	Candidate	Votes	%	±%
Democratic	Corinne Boyd Riley	3,626	99.9	−0.1
No party	Write-Ins	2	0.1	+0.1
Majority		3,624	99.8	−0.2
Turnout		3,628		
Democratic hold				

== 2nd congressional district ==
1962 South Carolina's 2nd congressional district election
- November 6th, 1962
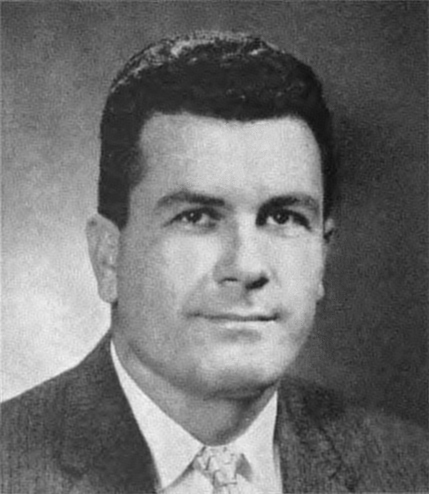

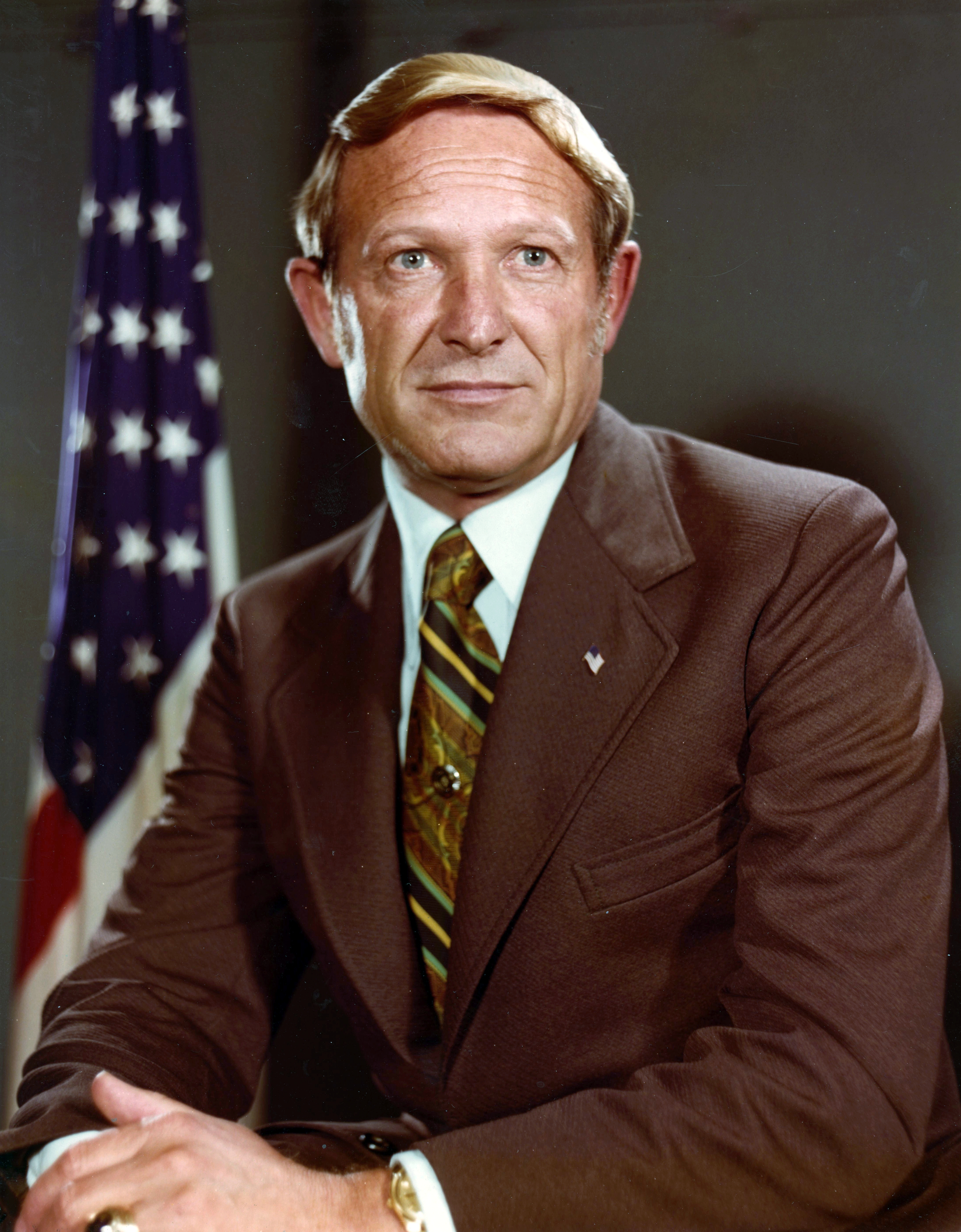
Nominee	Albert Watson	Floyd Spence
Party	Democratic	Republican
Popular vote	39,149	34,947
Percentage	52.8%	47.2%
- County results Spence: 50–60% 60–70% 70–80% Perry: 50–60%
U.S. Representative before election
Corinne Boyd Riley
Democratic
Elected U.S. Representative
Albert Watson
Democratic

Incumbent Democratic Congresswoman Corinne Boyd Riley of the 2nd congressional district succeeded her husband, John J. Riley, in office upon his death in 1962. She did not seek re-election and Democratic state Representative Albert Watson won the open seat against Republican Floyd Spence.

=== Democratic primary ===
Democratic primary
Candidate	Votes	%
Albert Watson	21,137	33.9
Frank C. Owens	15,531	24.9
Leonard A. Williamson	13,899	22.3
Al Cook	9,947	15.9
Gerard Hartzog	1,849	3.0

Democratic primary runoff
Candidate	Votes	%	±%
Albert Watson	17,644	51.8	+17.9
Frank C. Owens	16,398	48.2	+23.3

=== General election results ===
South Carolina's 2nd congressional district election results, 1962
Party	Candidate	Votes	%	±%
Democratic	Albert Watson	39,149	52.8	−47.1
Republican	Floyd Spence	34,947	47.2	+47.2
Majority		4,202	5.6	−94.2
Turnout		74,096		
Democratic hold				

== 3rd congressional district ==
Incumbent Democratic Congressman William Jennings Bryan Dorn of the 3rd congressional district, in office since 1951, was unopposed in his bid for re-election.

=== General election results ===
South Carolina's 3rd congressional district election results, 1962
Party	Candidate	Votes	%	±%
Democratic	William J.B. Dorn (incumbent)	34,545	100.0	0.0
No party	Write-Ins	11	0.0	0.0
Majority		34,534	100.0	0.0
Turnout		34,556		
Democratic hold				

== 4th congressional district ==
Incumbent Democratic Congressman Robert T. Ashmore of the 4th congressional district, in office since 1953, won the Democratic primary was unopposed in the general election.

=== Democratic primary ===
Democratic primary
Candidate	Votes	%
Robert T. Ashmore	39,334	70.8
James Workman	14,131	25.4
Marion Tyus	2,089	3.8

=== General election results ===
South Carolina's 4th congressional district election results, 1962
Party	Candidate	Votes	%	±%
Democratic	Robert T. Ashmore (incumbent)	47,044	100.0	0.0
Majority		47,044	100.0	0.0
Turnout		47,044		
Democratic hold				

== 5th congressional district ==
Incumbent Democratic Congressman Robert W. Hemphill of the 5th congressional district, in office since 1957, defeated Republican challenger Robert M. Doster.

=== General election results ===
South Carolina's 5th congressional district election results, 1962
Party	Candidate	Votes	%	±%
Democratic	Robert W. Hemphill (incumbent)	28,989	93.9	−6.1
Republican	Robert M. Doster	1,861	6.0	+6.0
No party	Write-Ins	18	0.1	+0.1
Majority		27,128	87.9	−12.1
Turnout		30,868		
Democratic hold				

== 6th congressional district ==
Incumbent Democratic Congressman John L. McMillan of the 6th congressional district, in office since 1939, defeated G. Stanley Bryant in the Democratic primary and was unopposed in the general election.

=== Democratic primary ===
Democratic primary
Candidate	Votes	%
John L. McMillan	46,726	81.4
G. Stanley Bryant	10,655	18.6

=== General election results ===
South Carolina's 6th congressional district election results, 1962
Party	Candidate	Votes	%	±%
Democratic	John L. McMillan (incumbent)	36,811	100.0	0.0
No party	Write-Ins	3	0.0	0.0
Majority		36,808	100.0	0.0
Turnout		36,814		
Democratic hold				

== See also ==
- 1962 United States House of Representatives elections
- 1962 United States Senate election in South Carolina
- 1962 South Carolina gubernatorial election
- South Carolina's congressional districts
