= 1965 United States House of Representatives elections =

There were at least four special elections to the United States House of Representatives in 1965, during 89th United States Congress.

Elections are listed by date and district.

== List of elections ==
District	Incumbent			This race	
District	Member	Party	First elected	Results	Candidates
South Carolina 2	Albert Watson	Democratic	1962	Incumbent resigned February 1, 1965, after being stripped of seniority by the House Democratic Caucus for supporting Republican presidential candidate Barry Goldwater. Incumbent re-elected June 15, 1965 as a Republican. Republican gain.	▌ ✓ Albert Watson (Republican) 59.1%; ▌Preston Callison (Democratic) 40.9%
Louisiana 7	Ashton Thompson	Democratic	1952	Incumbent died July 1, 1965. New member elected October 2, 1965. Democratic hold.	▌ ✓ Edwin Edwards (Democratic) 53.8%; ▌Gary Tyler (Democratic) 46.2%
Ohio 7	Clarence J. Brown	Republican	1938	Incumbent died August 23, 1965. New member elected November 2, 1965. Republican hold.	▌ ✓ Bud Brown (Republican) 59.6%; ▌James A. Berry (Democratic) 40.4%
California 26	James Roosevelt	Democratic	1954	Incumbent resigned to run for Mayor of Los Angeles. New member elected December 15, 1965. Democratic hold.	▌ ✓ Tom Rees (Democratic) 59.5%; ▌Edward M. Marshall (Republican) 40.5%
