= George Spencer =

George Spencer may refer to:

- George Spencer (c. 1600–1642), first white man to be executed in Connecticut, see Execution of George Spencer
- George Spencer, 4th Duke of Marlborough (1739–1817), British courtier and politician
- George Spencer, 2nd Earl Spencer (1758–1834), British Whig politician
- Ignatius Spencer (1799–1864), son of 2nd Earl Spencer, known as George Spencer before entering the Passionist congregation
- George Spencer (bishop) (1799–1866), Anglican bishop
- George E. Spencer (1836–1893), U.S. senator from the state of Alabama
- George Spencer (Labour politician) (1872–1957), Member of Parliament for Broxtowe, 1918–1929
- George Lloyd Spencer (1893–1981), Democratic United States senator from the state of Arkansas
- George Spencer (baseball) (1926–2014), American baseball pitcher
- George Spencer (rugby) (1878–1950), New Zealand rugby football player
- George Soule Spencer, American actor
- George Austin Spencer (1906–1997), American attorney, farmer, and politician from Missouri
- SS George Spencer, a wooden lake freighter

== See also ==
- George Spencer Academy, an academy school in Stapleford, Nottinghamshire, England
- George Spencer-Churchill (disambiguation)
