= 1988 United States House of Representatives elections in South Carolina =

- November 8, 1988

All 6 South Carolina seats to the United States House of Representatives
	Majority party	Minority party
Party	Democratic	Republican
Last election	4	2
Seats won	4	2
Seat change	Steady	Steady
Popular vote	549,652	439,476
Percentage	55.43%	44.32%

Republican
50–60%
60–70%
Democratic
50–60%
60–70%
70–80%
Winners
Democratic Hold
Republican Hold

The 1988 United States House of Representatives elections in South Carolina were held on November 8, 1988, to select six Representatives for two-year terms from the state of South Carolina. The primary elections for the Democrats and the Republicans were held on June 14. All six incumbents were re-elected and the composition of the state delegation remained four Democrats and two Republicans.

== 1st congressional district ==
Incumbent Republican Congressman Arthur Ravenel, Jr. of the 1st congressional district, in office since 1987, defeated Democratic challenger Wheeler Tillman.

=== General election results ===
South Carolina's 1st congressional district election results, 1988
Party	Candidate	Votes	%	±%
Republican	Arthur Ravenel, Jr. (incumbent)	101,572	63.8	+11.8
Democratic	Wheeler Tillman	57,691	36.2	−11.8
No party	Write-Ins	42	0.0	0.0
Majority		43,881	27.6	+23.6
Turnout		159,305		
Republican hold				

== 2nd congressional district ==
Incumbent Republican Congressman Floyd Spence of the 2nd congressional district, in office since 1971, defeated Democratic challenger Jim Leventis.

=== General election results ===
South Carolina's 2nd congressional district election results, 1988
Party	Candidate	Votes	%	±%
Republican	Floyd Spence (incumbent)	94,960	52.8	−0.8
Democratic	Jim Leventis	83,978	46.6	+0.2
Libertarian	Geb Sommer	1,061	0.6	+0.6
No party	Write-Ins	5	0.0	0.0
Majority		10,982	6.2	−1.0
Turnout		180,004		
Republican hold				

== 3rd congressional district ==
Incumbent Democratic Congressman Butler Derrick of the 3rd congressional district, in office since 1975, defeated Republican challenger Henry Jordan.

=== General election results ===
South Carolina's 3rd congressional district election results, 1988
Party	Candidate	Votes	%	±%
Democratic	Butler Derrick (incumbent)	89,071	53.7	−14.7
Republican	Henry Jordan	75,571	45.6	+14.1
Libertarian	John B. Heaton	1,183	0.7	+0.7
No party	Write-Ins	8	0.0	−0.1
Majority		13,500	8.1	−28.8
Turnout		165,833		
Democratic hold				

== 4th congressional district ==
Incumbent Democratic Congresswoman Liz J. Patterson of the 4th congressional district, in office since 1987, defeated Republican challenger Knox White.

=== Republican primary ===
Republican primary
Candidate	Votes	%
Knox White	15,096	56.9
Ted Adams	11,424	43.1

=== General election results ===
South Carolina's 4th congressional district election results, 1988
Party	Candidate	Votes	%	±%
Democratic	Liz J. Patterson (incumbent)	90,234	52.1	+0.7
Republican	Knox White	82,793	47.8	+0.5
No party	Write-Ins	108	0.1	0.0
Majority		7,441	4.3	+0.2
Turnout		173,135		
Democratic hold				

== 5th congressional district ==
Incumbent Democratic Congressman John M. Spratt, Jr. of the 5th congressional district, in office since 1983, defeated Republican challenger Robert K. Carley.

=== General election results ===
South Carolina's 5th congressional district election results, 1988
Party	Candidate	Votes	%	±%
Democratic	John M. Spratt, Jr. (incumbent)	107,959	69.8	−29.8
Republican	Robert K. Carley	46,622	30.2	+30.2
No party	Write-Ins	17	0.0	−0.4
Majority		61,337	39.6	−59.6
Turnout		154,598		
Democratic hold				

== 6th congressional district ==
Incumbent Democratic Congressman Robin Tallon of the 6th congressional district, in office since 1983, defeated Republican challenger Bob Cunningham.

=== Democratic primary ===
Democratic primary
Candidate	Votes	%
Robin Tallon	65,608	88.6
Luther Lighty, Jr.	8,448	11.4

=== Republican primary ===
Republican primary
Candidate	Votes	%
Bob Cunningham	2,283	50.7
Doug Cooke	2,218	49.3

=== General election results ===
South Carolina's 6th congressional district election results, 1988
Party	Candidate	Votes	%	±%
Democratic	Robin Tallon (incumbent)	120,719	76.1	+0.6
Republican	Bob Cunningham	37,958	23.9	−0.6
No party	Write-Ins	52	0.0	0.0
Majority		82,761	52.2	−1.2
Turnout		158,729		
Democratic hold				

== Gallery ==
SC‑01 results by county

SC‑02 results by county

SC‑03 results by county

SC‑04 results by county

SC‑05 results by county

SC‑06 results by county

== See also ==
- United States House of Representatives elections, 1988
- South Carolina's congressional districts
