= Senator Spence (disambiguation) =

John S. Spence (1788–1840) was a U.S. Senator from Maryland from 1836 to 1840. Senator Spence may also refer to:

- Brent Spence (1874–1967), Kentucky State Senate
- Floyd Spence (1928–2001), South Carolina State Senate
- Nancy Spence (born 1936), Colorado State Senate

== See also ==
- Senator Spencer (disambiguation)
