= Martha Thomas Fitzgerald =

American Democratic politician from South Carolina (1894-1981)

Martha Elizabeth Thomas "Mattie" Fitzgerald (August 5, 1894 – January 23, 1981) was an educator and politician from South Carolina. She was the first woman elected to the South Carolina House of Representatives in a general election.

Fitzgerald, the daughter of James Henry Thomas and Ina Medora Thackston, was a native of Cherokee County and a graduate of Winthrop College, from which she received her degree in 1916; she also held an MA degree from the University of South Carolina and another MA from Columbia University, and performed further graduate work at the University of Chicago. She worked for some time as a schoolteacher, and served in a number of positions with the South Carolina Department of Education, including as a school community organizer, rural school supervisor, and director of elementary education. In 1941 she married Columbia businessman James Madison Harris Fitzgerald. She was an active member of many organizations, including the Business and Professional Women's Club, the League of Women Voters, Delta Kappa Gamma, United Daughters of the Confederacy, the Daughters of American Colonists, South Carolina Vocational Rehabilitation, the Altrusa Club, and the Salvation Army. For the Daughters of the American Colonists she served as editor of the Colonial Courier magazine. She also served as Executive Secretary of the South Carolina Governor's Commission on the Status of Women, and was Recording Secretary of the National Executive Board of the National Order of Women Legislators.

Fitzgerald was elected to the House in 1950, and served eleven terms as a Democrat, representing Richland County. She began her tenure as the only woman in the entire House of Representatives. Among causes for which she advocated during her time in office was the service of women as jury members, but the bill which she presented to allow this continually died in committee, and was not passed until she left office. She also supported higher pay for public school teachers. She was named Woman of the Year by The Progressive Farmer in 1960.

Fitzgerald decided to run for a seat in the United States House of Representatives in 1962. Her opponent in the primary was Corinne Boyd Riley, running to complete the term of her deceased husband; it was believed to be the first time in South Carolina history that two women had competed against each other in a congressional election. Fitzgerald's challenge of Riley was considered somewhat surprising, as it was tacitly understood among South Carolina's political class that any widow running to succeed her husband would remain unchallenged in the general election. Nevertheless, Fitzgerald claimed that her time as a state legislator made her more qualified to hold the position. Riley was still in mourning for her late husband and did no strenuous campaigning, promising only to pursue his agenda as best she could and to retire at the end of her term. Even so, Riley won the primary by a two-to-one plurality, carrying all eight counties in the district; she would later describe her victory over Fitzgerald as "rather surprising". Fitzgerald ran for Congress again in 1965 and was again defeated in the primary.

Fitzgerald is buried in the churchyard of the First Presbyterian Church in Columbia. An archive of papers relating to her time in public service is held by the library of the University of South Carolina, while another, similar archive is held by her alma mater.
