= 1984 United States House of Representatives elections in South Carolina =

- November 6, 1984

All 6 South Carolina seats to the United States House of Representatives
	Majority party	Minority party
Party	Democratic	Republican
Last election	3	3
Seats won	3	3
Seat change	Steady	Steady
District results
Democratic
50–60%
>90%
Republican
60–70%

The 1984 United States House of Representatives elections in South Carolina were held on November 6, 1984, to select six Representatives for two-year terms from the state of South Carolina. The primary elections for the Democrats and the Republicans were held on June 12. All six incumbents were re-elected and the composition of the state delegation remained three Democrats and three Republicans.

== 1st congressional district ==
Incumbent Republican Congressman Thomas F. Hartnett of the 1st congressional district, in office since 1981, defeated Democratic challenger Ed Pendarvis.

=== General election results ===
South Carolina's 1st congressional district election results, 1984
Party	Candidate	Votes	%	±%
Republican	Tommy Hartnett (incumbent)	103,289	61.7	
Democratic	Ed Pendarvis	64,022	38.3	
No Party	Write-In	2	0.0	
Majority		39,267	23.4	
Turnout		167,313		
Republican hold				

== 2nd congressional district ==
Incumbent Republican Congressman Floyd Spence of the 2nd congressional district, in office since 1971, defeated Democratic challenger Ken Mosely.

=== Democratic primary ===
Democratic primary
Candidate	Votes	%
Ken Mosely	21,560	53.0
Nancy Stevenson	19,125	47.0

=== General election results ===
South Carolina's 2nd congressional district election results, 1984
Party	Candidate	Votes	%	±%
Republican	Floyd Spence (incumbent)	108,084	62.1	
Democratic	Ken Mosely	63,931	36.7	
Libertarian	Cynthia E. Sullivan	2,010	1.2	
No party	Write-Ins	49	0.0	
Majority		44,153	25.4	
Turnout		174,074		
Republican hold				

== 3rd congressional district ==
Incumbent Democratic Congressman Butler Derrick of the 3rd congressional district, in office since 1975, defeated Republican challenger Clarence E. Taylor.

=== Republican primary ===
Republican primary
Candidate	Votes	%
Clarence E. Taylor	3,845	64.7
Garfield W. Flurett	2,096	35.3

=== General election results ===
South Carolina's 3rd congressional district election results, 1984
Party	Candidate	Votes	%	±%
Democratic	Butler Derrick (incumbent)	88,917	58.4	
Republican	Clarence E. Taylor	61,739	40.6	
Libertarian	Robert Madden	1,509	1.0	
No party	Write-Ins	7	0.0	
Majority		27,178	17.8	
Turnout		152,172		
Democratic hold				

== 4th congressional district ==
Incumbent Republican Congressman Carroll Campbell of the 4th congressional district, in office since 1979, defeated Democratic challenger Jeff Smith.

=== General election results ===
South Carolina's 4th congressional district election results, 1984
Party	Candidate	Votes	%	±%
Republican	Carroll Campbell (incumbent)	105,139	63.9	
Democratic	Jeff Smith	57,854	35.2	
Libertarian	William Ray Pike	1,431	0.9	
No party	Write-Ins	59	0.0	
Majority		47,285	28.7	
Turnout		164,483		
Republican hold				

== 5th congressional district ==
Incumbent Democratic Congressman John M. Spratt, Jr. of the 5th congressional district, in office since 1983, defeated two minor party candidates.

=== General election results ===
South Carolina's 5th congressional district election results, 1984
Party	Candidate	Votes	%	±%
Democratic	John M. Spratt, Jr. (incumbent)	98,513	91.8	
American	Dick Winchester	4,593	4.3	
Libertarian	Linda Blevins	4,185	3.9	
No party	Write-Ins	27	0.0	
Majority		93,920	87.5	
Turnout		107,318		
Democratic hold				

== 6th congressional district ==
Incumbent Democratic Congressman Robin Tallon of the 6th congressional district, in office since 1983, won the Democratic primary and defeated Republican Martha Lois Eargle in the general election.

=== Democratic primary ===
Democratic primary
Candidate	Votes	%
Robin Tallon	61,927	74.3
Mary Demetrious	17,385	20.8
Luther Lighty, Jr.	4,053	4.9

=== Republican primary ===
Republican primary
Candidate	Votes	%
Martha Lois Eargle	3,120	66.5
James N. Maurer	1,569	33.5

=== General election results ===
South Carolina's 6th congressional district election results, 1984
Party	Candidate	Votes	%	±%
Democratic	Robin Tallon (incumbent)	97,329	59.9	
Republican	Martha Lois Eargle	63,005	38.8	
Libertarian	Hugh Thompson	2,050	1.3	
No party	Write-Ins	13	0.0	
Majority		34,324	21.1	
Turnout		162,397		
Democratic hold				

== See also ==
- United States House elections, 1984
- United States Senate election in South Carolina, 1984
- South Carolina's congressional districts
