= 2000 United States House of Representatives elections in South Carolina =

- November 7, 2000

All 6 South Carolina seats to the United States House of Representatives
	Majority party	Minority party
Party	Republican	Democratic
Last election	4	2
Seats won	4	2
Seat change	Steady	Steady
Popular vote	729,803	523,141
Percentage	55.23%	39.59%
Swing	▼4.38	▲1.59

Republican
50–60%
60–70%
70–80%
80–90%
Democratic
50–60%
60–70%
70–80%
80–90%
Winners
Republican Hold
Democratic Hold

The 2000 United States House of Representatives elections in South Carolina were held on November 7, 2000, to select six Representatives for two-year terms from the state of South Carolina. The primary elections for the Democrats and the Republicans were held on June 13 and the runoff elections were held two weeks later on June 27. All five incumbents who ran were re-elected and the open seat in the 1st congressional district was retained by the Republicans. The composition of the state delegation remained four Republicans and two Democrats.

== Overview ==
United States House of Representatives elections in South Carolina, 2000
Party	Votes	Percentage	Seats	+/–
Republican	729,803	55.23%	4	—
Democratic	523,141	39.59%	2	—
Libertarian	31,104	2.35%	0	—
Others	37,264	2.82%	0	—
Totals	1,321,312	100.00%	6	—

== District 1 ==
2000 South Carolina's 1st congressional district election
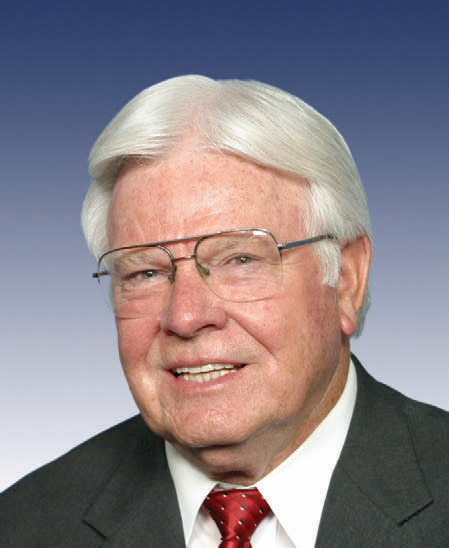

Nominee	Henry E. Brown, Jr.	Andy Brack
Party	Republican	Democratic
Popular vote	139,597	82,622
Percentage	60.3%	35.7%
- County results Brown: 50–60% 60–70%
U.S. Representative before election
Mark Sanford
Republican
Elected U.S. Representative
Henry E. Brown, Jr.
Republican

Incumbent Republican Congressman Mark Sanford of the 1st congressional district, in office since 1995, honored his campaign pledge that he would only serve three terms and retired. Henry E. Brown, Jr. won the Republican primary and defeated Democrat Andy Brack in the general election. Sanford later held this seat again from 2013 to 2019.

=== Republican primary ===
Republican primary
Candidate	Votes	%
Henry E. Brown, Jr.	22,072	43.6
Harry B. "Buck" Limehouse	17,171	33.9
Van Jenerette	4,269	8.4
Wheeler Tillman	2,627	5.2
Mike Seekings	2,470	4.9
Charlie Thompson	1,998	4.0

Republican primary runoff
Candidate	Votes	%	±%
Henry E. Brown, Jr.	21,631	54.6	+11.0
Harry B. "Buck" Limehouse	17,990	45.4	+11.5

=== General election results ===
South Carolina's 1st congressional district election results, 2000
Party	Candidate	Votes	%	±%
Republican	Henry E. Brown, Jr.	139,597	60.3	−30.7
Democratic	Andy Brack	82,622	35.7	+35.7
Libertarian	Bill Woolsey	6,010	2.6	+2.6
Reform	Bob Batchelder	2,067	0.9	+0.9
Natural Law	Joseph F. Innella	1,110	0.5	−8.4
No party	Write-Ins	40	0.0	−0.1
Majority		56,975	24.6	−57.5
Turnout		231,446		
Republican hold				

== District 2 ==
2000 South Carolina's 2nd congressional district election
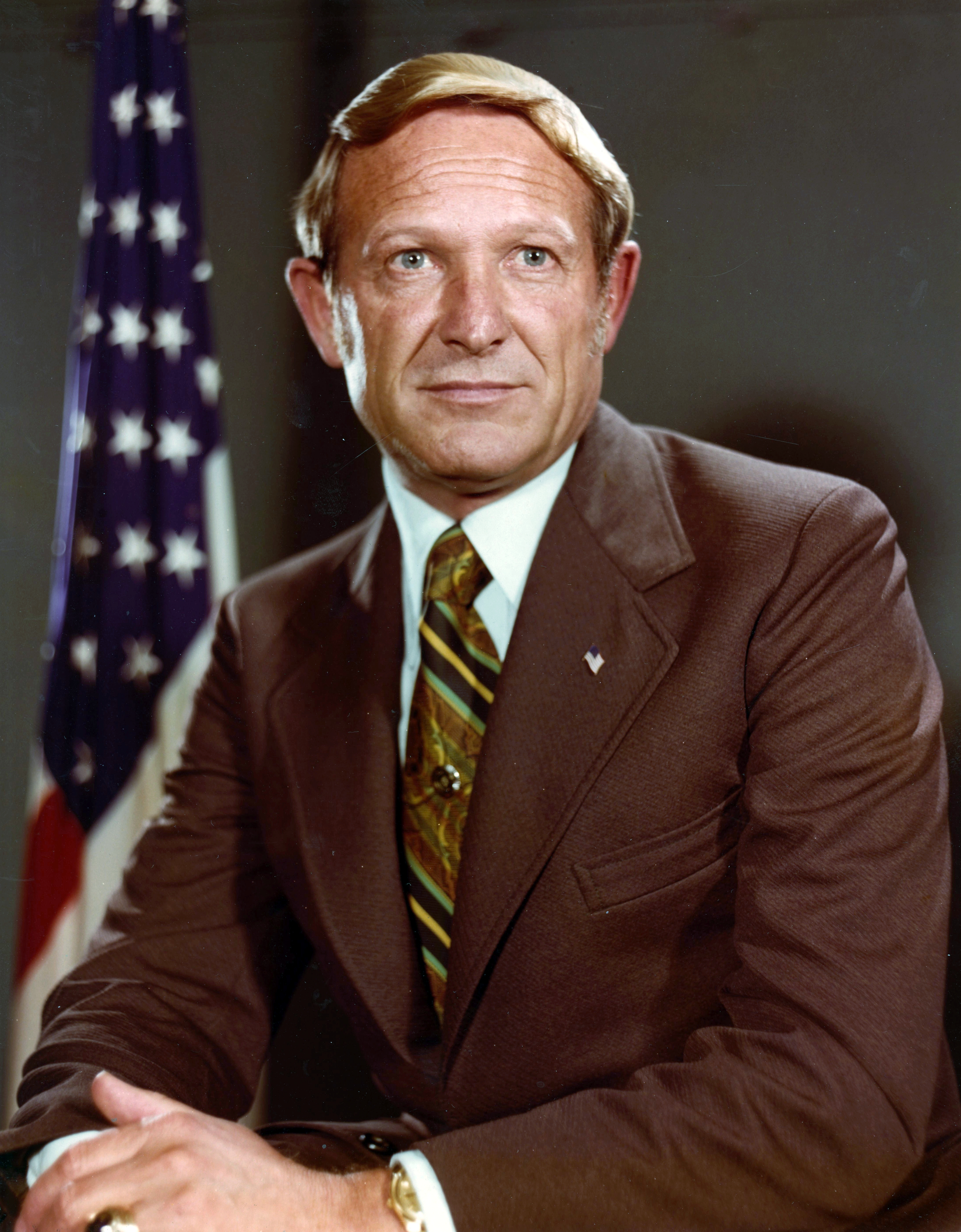

Nominee	Floyd Spence	Jane Frederick
Party	Republican	Democratic
Popular vote	153,870	110,161
Percentage	57.0%	40.8%
- County results Frederick: 40–50% 60–70% 70–80% Spence: 50–60% 60–70%
U.S. Representative before election
Floyd Spence
Republican
Elected U.S. Representative
Floyd Spence
Republican

Incumbent Republican Congressman Floyd Spence of the 2nd congressional district, in office since 1971, defeated Democratic challenger Jane Frederick.

=== General election results ===
South Carolina's 2nd congressional district election results, 2000
Party	Candidate	Votes	%	±%
Republican	Floyd Spence (incumbent)	153,870	57.0	−0.8
Democratic	Jane Frederick	110,161	40.8	−0.3
Libertarian	Timothy Moultrie	3,584	1.3	+1.3
Natural Law	George C. Taylor	2,259	0.9	−0.2
No party	Write-Ins	71	0.0	0.0
Majority		43,709	16.2	−0.5
Turnout		269,945		
Republican hold				

== District 3 ==
2000 South Carolina's 3rd congressional district election
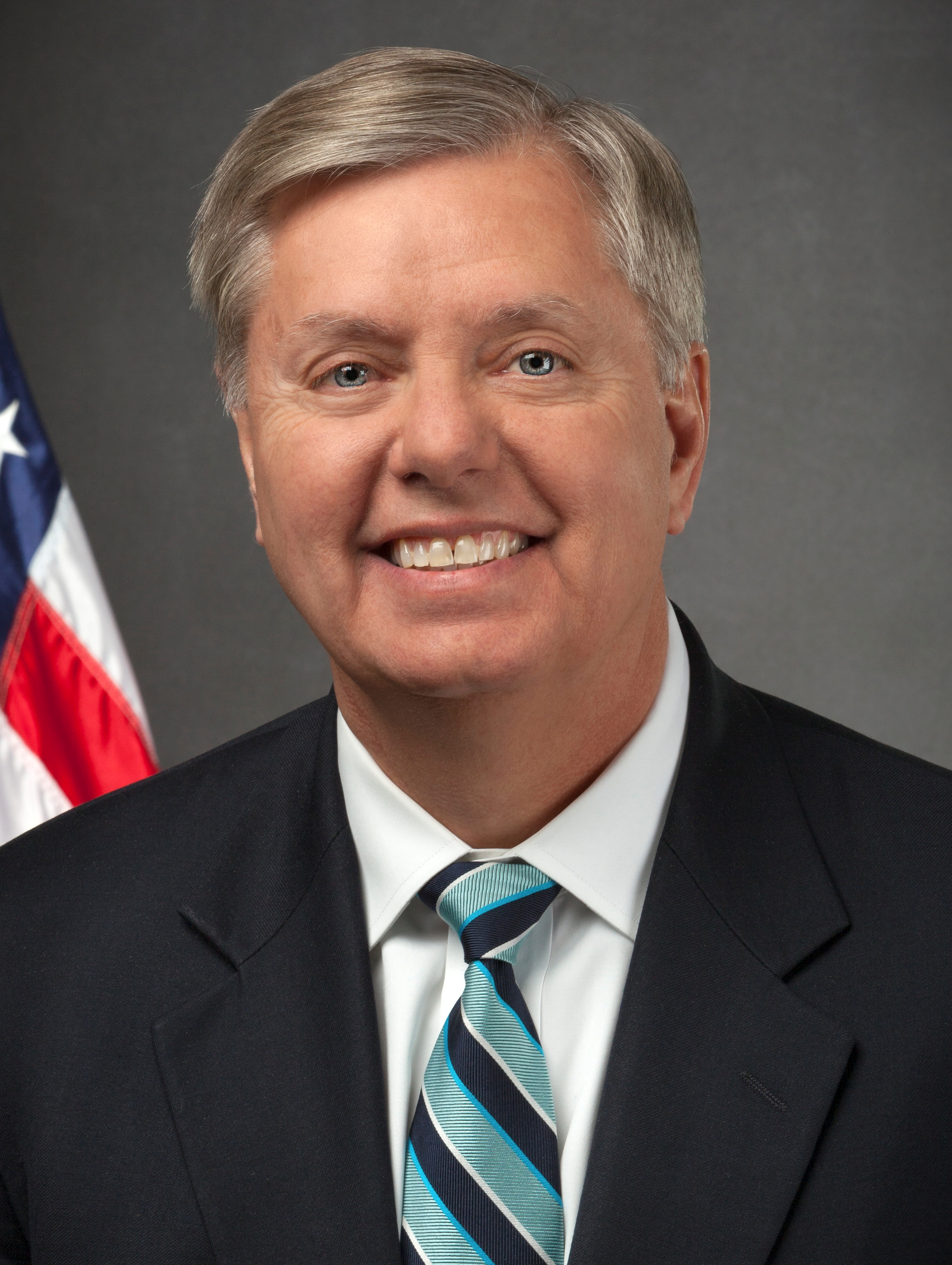

Nominee	Lindsey Graham	George L. Brightharp*
Party	Republican	Democratic
Popular vote	150,176	67,174
Percentage	67.8%	30.3%
- County results Graham: 50–60% 60–70% 70–80%
U.S. Representative before election
Lindsey Graham
Republican
Elected U.S. Representative
Lindsey Graham
Republican

Incumbent Republican Congressman Lindsey Graham of the 3rd congressional district, in office since 1995, defeated Democratic challenger George L. Brightharp.

=== General election results ===
South Carolina's 3rd congressional district election results, 2000
Party	Candidate	Votes	%	±%
Republican	Lindsey Graham (incumbent)	150,176	67.8	−31.9
Democratic	George L. Brightharp*	67,174	30.3	+30.3
Libertarian	Adrian Banks	3,116	1.4	+1.4
Natural Law	Leroy J. Klein	1,122	0.5	+0.5
No party	Write-Ins	33	0.0	−0.3
Majority		83,002	37.5	−61.9
Turnout		221,621		
Republican hold				
*Brightharp also ran under the United Citizens Party; his totals are combined.

== District 4 ==
2000 South Carolina's 4th congressional district election
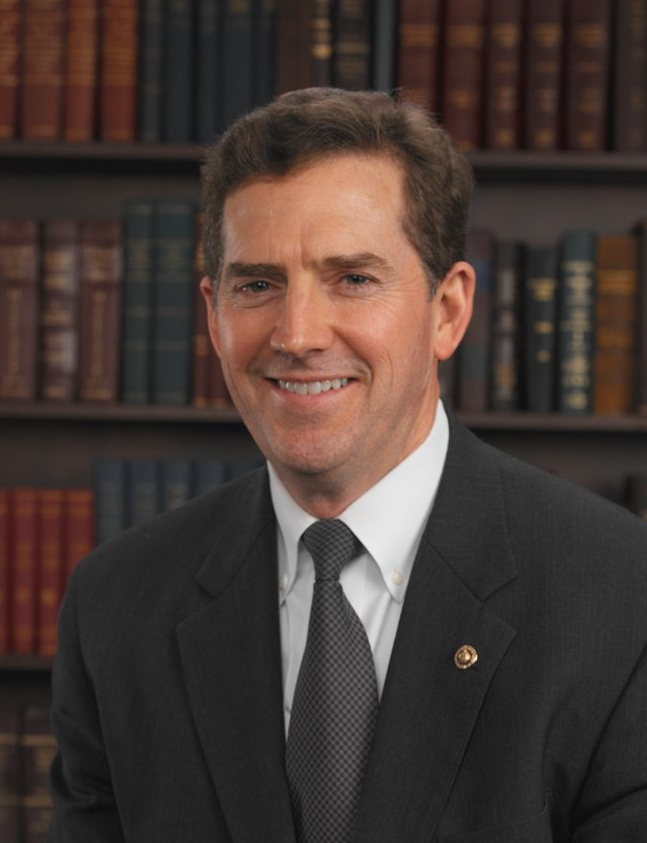

Nominee	Jim DeMint	Ted Adams	April Bishop
Party	Republican	Constitution	Libertarian
Popular vote	150,436	16,532	12,757
Percentage	79.6%	8.7%	6.7%
- County results DeMint: 70–80% 80–90%
U.S. Representative before election
Jim DeMint
Republican
Elected U.S. Representative
Jim DeMint
Republican

Incumbent Republican Congressman Jim DeMint of the 4th congressional district, in office since 1999, defeated Franklin D. Raddish in the Republican primary and won the general election against several minor party candidates.

=== Republican primary ===
Republican primary
Candidate	Votes	%
Jim DeMint	41,851	77.3
Franklin D. Raddish	12,279	22.7

=== General election results ===
South Carolina's 4th congressional district election results, 2000
Party	Candidate	Votes	%	±%
Republican	Jim DeMint (incumbent)	150,436	79.6	+21.9
Constitution	Ted Adams	16,532	8.7	+8.7
Libertarian	April Bishop	12,757	6.7	+6.7
Reform	Peter J. Ashy*	6,210	3.3	+2.4
Natural Law	C. Faye Walters	2,640	1.4	+0.3
No party	Write-Ins	476	0.3	+0.2
Majority		133,904	70.9	+53.4
Turnout		189,051		
Republican hold				
*Ashy also ran under the United Citizens Party; his totals are combined.

== District 5 ==
2000 South Carolina's 5th congressional district election
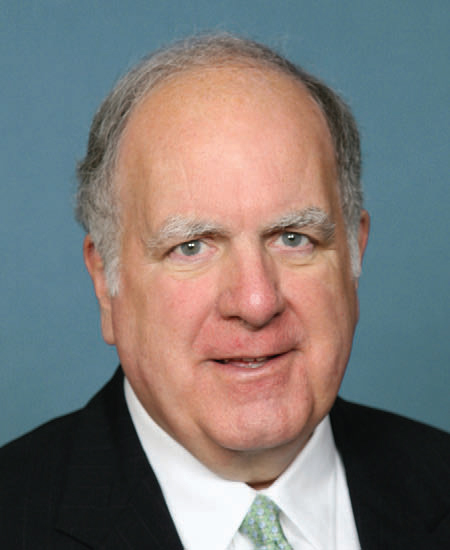

Nominee	John M. Spratt, Jr.	Carl L. Gullick
Party	Democratic	Republican
Popular vote	126,877	85,247
Percentage	58.8%	39.5%
- County results Spratt: 50–60% 60–70% 70–80% 80–90%
U.S. Representative before election
John M. Spratt, Jr.
Democratic
Elected U.S. Representative
John M. Spratt, Jr.
Democratic

Incumbent Democratic Congressman John M. Spratt, Jr. of the 5th congressional district, in office since 1983, defeated Republican challenger Carl L. Gullick.

=== General election results ===
South Carolina's 5th congressional district election results, 2000
Party	Candidate	Votes	%	±%
Democratic	John M. Spratt, Jr. (incumbent)	126,877	58.8	+0.9
Republican	Carl L. Gullick	85,247	39.5	−0.8
Libertarian	Tom Campbell	3,665	1.7	+1.7
No party	Write-Ins	49	0.0	−0.1
Majority		41,630	19.3	+1.7
Turnout		215,838		
Democratic hold				

== District 6 ==
2000 South Carolina's 6th congressional district election
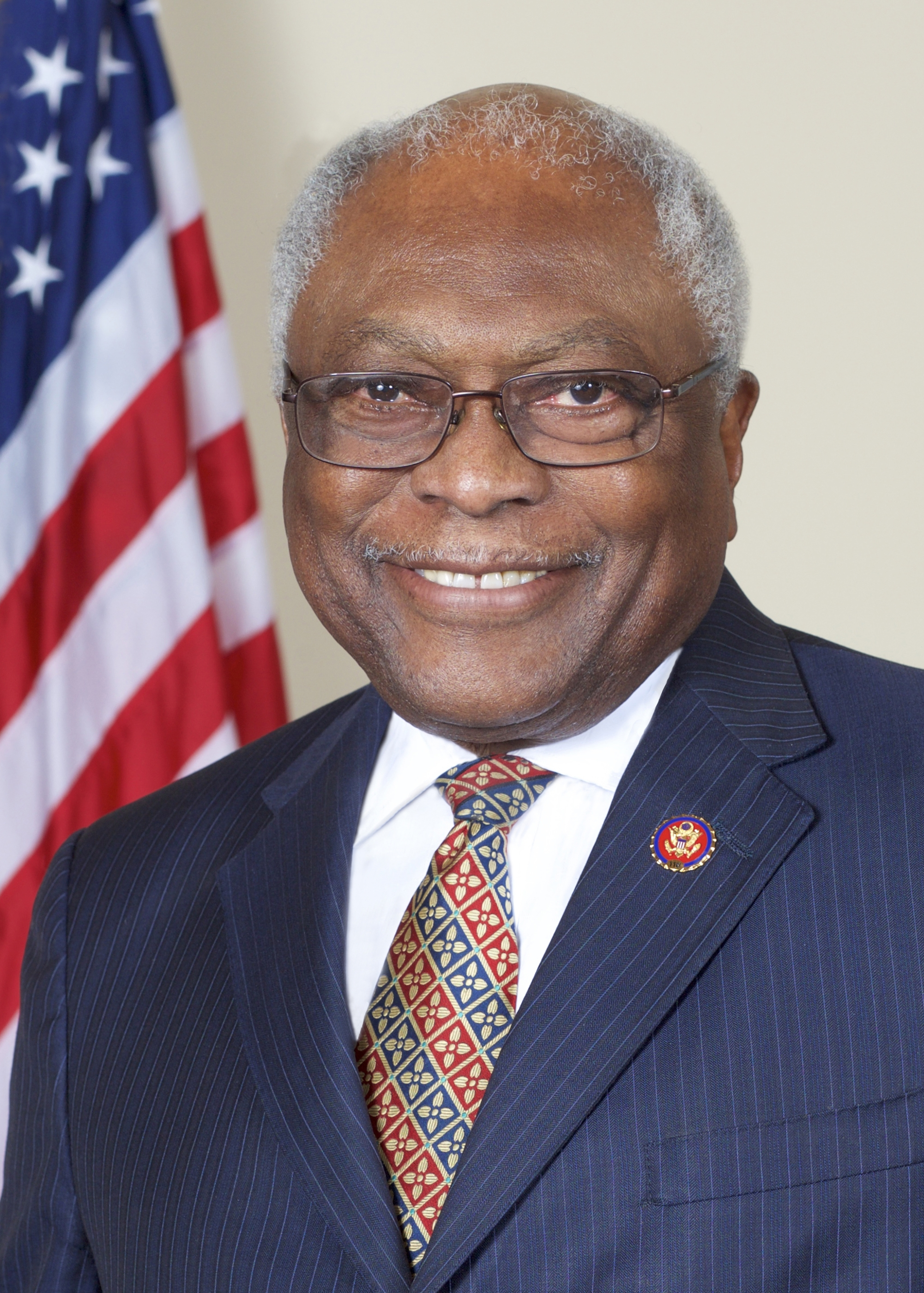

Nominee	Jim Clyburn	Vince Ellison
Party	Democratic	Republican
Popular vote	138,053	50,005
Percentage	71.8%	26.0%
- County results Clyburn: 50–60% 60–70% 70–80% 80–90%
U.S. Representative before election
Jim Clyburn
Democratic
Elected U.S. Representative
Jim Clyburn
Democratic

Incumbent Democratic Congressman Jim Clyburn of the 6th congressional district, in office since 1993, defeated Republican challenger Vince Ellison.

=== General election results ===
South Carolina's 6th congressional district election results, 2000
Party	Candidate	Votes	%	±%
Democratic	Jim Clyburn (incumbent)	138,053	71.8	−0.8
Republican	Vince Ellison	50,005	26.0	+0.2
Natural Law	Dianne L. Nevins	2,339	1.2	−0.3
Libertarian	Lynwood E. Hines	1,934	1.0	+1.0
No party	Write-Ins	49	0.0	−0.1
Majority		88,048	45.8	−1.0
Turnout		192,380		
Democratic hold				

== See also ==
- United States House elections, 2000
- South Carolina's congressional districts
