= Senator Spencer =

Senator Spencer may refer to:

== Members of the United States Senate ==
- George E. Spencer (1836–1893), U.S. Senator from Alabama from 1868 to 1879
- Lloyd Spencer (1893–1981), U.S. Senator from Arkansas from 1941 to 1943
- Selden P. Spencer (1862–1925), U.S. Senator from Missouri from 1918 to 1925

== United States state senate members ==
- Ambrose Spencer (1765–1848), New York State Senate
- George Austin Spencer (1906–1997), Missouri State Senate
- Horace C. Spencer (1832–1926), Michigan State Senate
- John Canfield Spencer (1788–1855), New York State Senate
- Joseph Spencer (New York politician) (1790–1823), New York State Senate
- Joshua A. Spencer (1790–1857), New York State Senate
- Mark Spencer (Indiana politician) (fl. 2020s), Indiana State Senate
- Mark Spencer (New York politician) (1787–1859), New York State Senate
- Samuel R. Spencer (1871–1961), Connecticut State Senate
- Tom Spencer (Florida politician) (1928–2018), Florida State Senate

== See also ==
- Senator Spence (disambiguation)
