= 1970 South Carolina gubernatorial election =

- November 3, 1970
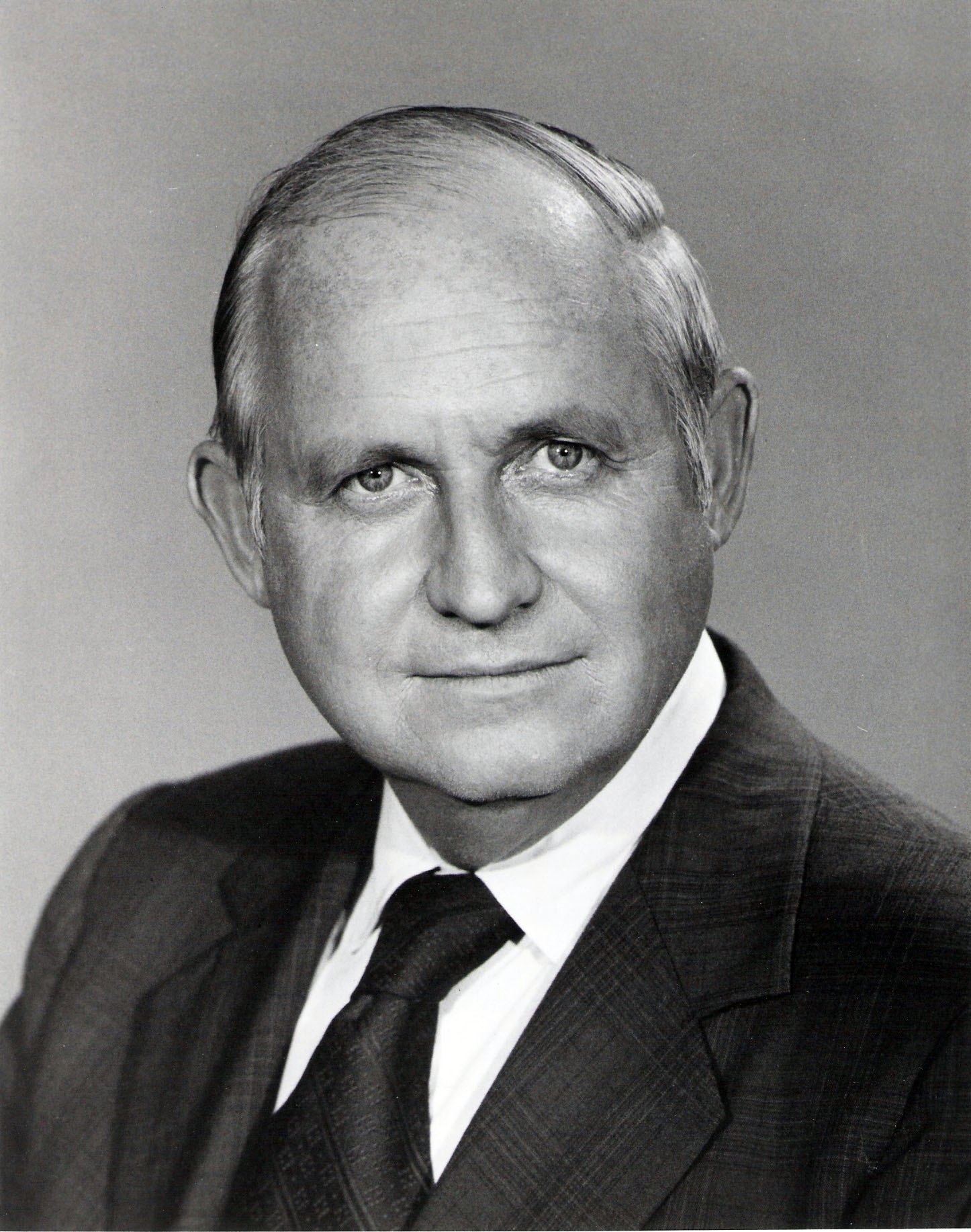

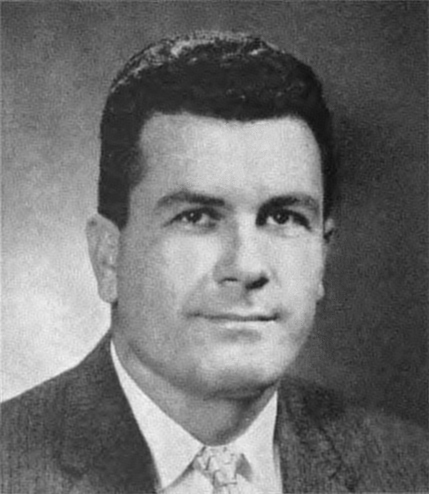
Nominee	John C. West	Albert Watson
Party	Democratic	Republican
Popular vote	251,151	221,236
Percentage	52.09%	45.89%
- County results West: 40–50% 50–60% 60–70% 70–80% Watson: 40–50% 50–60% 60–70%
Governor before election
Robert Evander McNair
Democratic
Elected Governor
John Carl West
Democratic

The 1970 South Carolina gubernatorial election was held on November 3, 1970 to select the governor of the state of South Carolina. John C. West, the Democratic nominee, won a close general election against Albert Watson, the Republican congressman from the 2nd congressional district.

The New York Times credited West's victory to his success among Black voters, "whites who were moderate on racial issues", and segments of the white working-class who supported George Wallace's 1968 presidential campaign but were disappointed with the state of the economy.

Central to the campaign was the issue of school integration: Watson ran a segregationist campaign and pledged to "stand up" to federal judicial orders to desegregate schools.

== Primaries ==
Both John Carl West and Albert Watson faced no opposition in their party's primaries which allowed both candidates to concentrate solely on the general election.

== General election ==
=== Candidates ===
- Alfred W. Bethea, candidate for Governor in 1962 (American Independent)
- Albert Watson, U.S. Representative from Columbia (Republican)
- John C. West, Lieutenant Governor of South Carolina (Democratic)

=== Campaign ===
Watson's campaign was supported by President Richard Nixon and Senator Strom Thurmond. Watson's anti-integration campaign rhetoric is considered to have contributed to a white supremacist riot that targeted Black schoolchildren. Watson would defend the rioters, stating that "you can expect that to happen when you have frustrated people ... People get restless and then things occur."

The general election was held on November 3, 1970 and West was elected as the next governor of South Carolina. Turnout was even higher than the previous gubernatorial election because of the recent enfranchisement of Black voters and the controversial candidacy of Albert Watson.

=== Results ===
South Carolina Gubernatorial Election, 1970
Party	Candidate	Votes	%	±%
Democratic	John Carl West	251,151	52.09	−6.1
Republican	Albert Watson	221,236	45.89	+4.1
American Independent	Alfred W. "Red" Bethea	9,758	2.02	+2.0
Majority		29,915	6.20	−10.2
Turnout		482,145	54.24	+4.7
Democratic hold				

== Ballot measures ==
6 constitutional amendments were voted on during the election, including one that removed the defunct provision requiring a voter to be a male.

== See also ==
- Governor of South Carolina
- List of governors of South Carolina
- South Carolina gubernatorial elections

Preceded by 1966	South Carolina gubernatorial elections	Succeeded by 1974
