= George Churchill =

George Churchill may refer to:

- George Churchill (Royal Navy officer) (1654–1710), Royal Navy admiral, politician, Member of Parliament
- George Churchill (British Army officer) (died 1753), son of the above
- George Percy Churchill (1877–1973), British historian and diplomat
- George B. Churchill (1866–1925), U.S. Representative from Massachusetts

== See also ==
- George Spencer-Churchill (disambiguation)
