= South Carolina's 2nd congressional district =

U.S. House district for South Carolina

Coordinates: 33.63°N 81.35°W

- Interactive map of district boundaries since January 3, 2023
- Representative: Joe Wilson; R–Springdale
- Population (2025): 788,482
- Median household income: $79,138
- Ethnicity: 61.1% White; 24.9% Black; 7.0% Hispanic; 4.0% Two or more races; 2.2% Asian; 0.8% other
- Cook PVI: R+7

South Carolina's 2nd congressional district is in central and southwestern South Carolina. The district spans from Columbia to the South Carolina side of the Augusta, Georgia metropolitan area.

From 1993 through 2012, it included all of Lexington, Jasper, Hampton, Allendale and Barnwell counties; most of Richland and Beaufort counties and parts of Aiken, Calhoun and Orangeburg counties.

It was made more compact in the 2010 round of redistricting, and now comprises all of Lexington, Aiken and Barnwell counties, most of Richland County, and part of Orangeburg County. Besides Columbia (60 percent of which is in the district), other major cities in the district include Aiken and North Augusta.

The district's current configuration dates from 1933, following South Carolina losing a seat in apportionment as a result of the 1930 Census showing that the state's population had declined. Before that time, much of its territory had been within the 6th district.

As a Columbia-based district from 1933 to the early 1990s, it was a fairly compact district in the central part of the state, which was largely coextensive with the Columbia metropolitan area. As a result of the 1990 census, the state legislature was required to draw a black-majority district. In a deal between Republicans and Democrats, the 6th district, previously located in the northeastern portion of the state, was reconfigured to incorporate most of the old 2nd's black residents. To make up for the loss in population, the 2nd was pushed as far west as the fringes of the Augusta suburbs and as far south as Beaufort/Hilton Head. As of 2019, the district was more than 69% white.

Since 1965 the 2nd district has been held by the Republican Party, coinciding with the late 20th-century realignment of political parties in the South. In the decades after the Civil War and before disenfranchisement in 1895 under the new state constitution, members of the Republican Party in South Carolina and the South were mostly African Americans, including many freedmen enfranchised due to Republican support for amendments for emancipation, citizenship and the franchise. After white Democrats regained control of state governments across the South, in the late 19th century, they passed new constitutions from 1890 to 1908 to disenfranchise blacks, excluding them totally from the political process. The Republican Party was crippled in the region and nearly comatose.

As a result of the Civil Rights Movement, Congress passed the Voting Rights Act of 1965, which provided for federal enforcement of blacks' constitutional rights. That year, the 2nd district's second-term Democratic congressman, Albert Watson, resigned, then ran as a Republican in the ensuing special election and won, becoming the first Republican to represent South Carolina in the House since Reconstruction.

However, the district had begun shedding its Yellow Dog Democrat roots before then. Some of the old-line Democrats began splitting their tickets as early as the 1940s. Lexington County has not supported the official Democratic candidate for president since 1944, and Aiken County not since 1952. The district swung hard to Strom Thurmond during his third-party bid for president in 1948, and gave an equally massive margin to Barry Goldwater in 1964. Since 1964, Jimmy Carter has been the only Democrat to come close to carrying it. However, conservative Democrats held most local offices well into the 1980s.

Watson gave up the seat to run for governor in 1970. His successor, state senator Floyd Spence, held the seat for more than 30 years. He was chairman of the House Armed Services Committee from 1995 to 2001, and died a few months after being elected to a 16th term. He was succeeded in a special election by one of his former aides, state senator Joe Wilson.

Wilson has since been reelected eleven times. In the most recent election, held on November 11, 2022, Wilson earned 60% of the vote against Democrat Judd Larkins.

== Composition ==
For the 118th and successive Congresses (based on redistricting following the 2020 census), the district contains all or portions of the following counties and communities:

Aiken County (17)
All 17 communities
Barnwell County (7)
All 7 communities
Lexington County (21)
All 21 communities
Orangeburg County (8)
Cope, Cordova, Livingston, Neeses, North, Norway, Springfield, Woodford
Richland County (9)
Arcadia Lakes, Blythewood (part; also 5th; shared with Fairfield County), Capitol View (part; also 6th), Columbia (part; also 6th; shared with Lexington County), Dentsville (part; also 6th), Forest Acres (part; also 6th), Irmo (shared with Lexington County), Lake Murray of Richland, St. Andrews (part; also 6th), Woodfield

== Recent election results from statewide races ==
Year	Office	Results
2008	President	McCain 59% - 40%
2012	President	Romney 59% - 41%
2016	President	Trump 56% - 39%
2016	Senate	Scott 62% - 35%
2018	Governor	McMaster 54% - 46%
2018	Secretary of State	Hammond 59% - 41%
2018	Treasurer	Loftis 57% - 39%
2018	Attorney General	Wilson 56% - 42%
2020	President	Trump 55% - 44%
2020	Senate	Graham 54% - 44%
2022	Senate	Scott 62% - 38%
2022	Governor	McMaster 56% - 42%
2022	Secretary of State	Hammond 63% - 37%
2024	President	Trump 56% - 42%
2026	Senate	Andrews 53% - 43%
2026	Governor	Johnson 49.57% - 49.18%

== List of members representing the district ==
Member (Residence)	Party	Years	Cong ress	Electoral history	District location
District established March 4, 1789
Aedanus Burke (Charleston)	Anti-Administration	March 4, 1789 – March 3, 1791	1st	Elected in 1788. Retired.	1789–1793 "Beaufort-Orangeburg district" South Carolina congressional districts, 1789–1793 1st district, Charleston 2nd district, Beaufort-Orangeburg 3rd district, Georgetown-Cheraw 4th district, Camden 5th district, Ninety-Six
Robert Barnwell (Beaufort)	Pro-Administration	March 4, 1791 – March 3, 1793	2nd	Elected in 1790. Retired.	1789–1793 "Beaufort-Orangeburg district" South Carolina congressional districts, 1789–1793 1st district, Charleston 2nd district, Beaufort-Orangeburg 3rd district, Georgetown-Cheraw 4th district, Camden 5th district, Ninety-Six
John Hunter (Newberry)	Anti-Administration	March 4, 1793 – March 3, 1795	3rd	Elected in 1793. Redistricted to the 5th district and lost re-election.	1793–1797 "Beaufort-Orangeburg district"
Wade Hampton (Columbia)	Democratic-Republican	March 4, 1795 – March 3, 1797	4th	Elected January 19–20, 1795 to finish the term of member-elect Robert Barnwell, who had declined to serve. Retired.	1793–1797 "Beaufort-Orangeburg district"
John Rutledge Jr. (Charleston)	Federalist	March 4, 1797 – March 3, 1803	5th 6th 7th	Elected in 1796. Re-elected in 1798. Re-elected in 1800. Lost re-election.	1797–1803 "Beaufort district" 1796 election results by district
William Butler (Saluda)	Democratic-Republican	March 4, 1803 – March 3, 1813	8th 9th 10th 11th 12th	Redistricted from the 5th district and re-elected in 1803. Re-elected in 1804. Re-elected in 1806. Re-elected in 1808. Re-elected in 1810. Retired.	1803–1813 "Beaufort and Edgefield district"
William Lowndes (Jacksonboro)	Democratic-Republican	March 4, 1813 – May 8, 1822	13th 14th 15th 16th 17th	Redistricted from the 4th district and re-elected in 1812. Re-elected in 1814. Re-elected in 1816. Re-elected in 1818. Re-elected in 1820. Resigned.	1813–1833 "Beaufort district"
Vacant		May 8, 1822 – December 13, 1822	17th		1813–1833 "Beaufort district"
James Hamilton Jr. (Charleston)	Democratic-Republican (Note: Supported the Jackson faction in the 1824 United States presidential election.)	December 13, 1822 – March 3, 1825	17th 18th 19th 20th	Elected to finish Lowndes's term. Re-elected in 1823. Re-elected in 1824. Re-elected in 1826. Retired.	1813–1833 "Beaufort district"
James Hamilton Jr. (Charleston)	Jackson	March 4, 1825 – March 3, 1829	17th 18th 19th 20th	Elected to finish Lowndes's term. Re-elected in 1823. Re-elected in 1824. Re-elected in 1826. Retired.	1813–1833 "Beaufort district"
Robert W. Barnwell (Beaufort)	Jackson	March 4, 1829 – March 3, 1831	21st 22nd	Elected in 1828. Re-elected in 1830. Retired.	1813–1833 "Beaufort district"
Robert W. Barnwell (Beaufort)	Nullifier	March 4, 1831 – March 3, 1833	21st 22nd	Elected in 1828. Re-elected in 1830. Retired.	1813–1833 "Beaufort district"
William J. Grayson (Beaufort)	Nullifier	March 4, 1833 – March 3, 1837	23rd 24th	Elected in 1833. Re-elected in 1834. Lost re-election.	1833–1843 [data missing]
Robert Rhett (Beaufort)	Democratic	March 4, 1837 – March 3, 1843	25th 26th 27th	Elected in 1836. Re-elected in 1838. Re-elected in 1840. Redistricted to the 7th district.	1833–1843 [data missing]
Richard F. Simpson (Pendleton)	Democratic	March 4, 1843 – March 3, 1849	28th 29th 30th	Elected in 1843. Re-elected in 1844. Re-elected in 1846. Retired.	1843–1853 [data missing]
James L. Orr (Anderson)	Democratic	March 4, 1849 – March 3, 1853	31st 32nd	Elected in 1848. Re-elected in 1850. Redistricted to the 5th district.	1843–1853 [data missing]
William Aiken Jr. (Charleston)	Democratic	March 4, 1853 – March 3, 1857	33rd 34th	Redistricted from the 6th district and re-elected in 1853. Re-elected in 1854. Retired.	1853–1860 [data missing]
William P. Miles (Charleston)	Democratic	March 4, 1857 – December 24, 1860	35th 36th	Re-elected in 1856. Re-elected in 1858. Re-elected in 1860 but retired due to Civil War.	1853–1860 [data missing]
District inactive		December 24, 1860 – July 20, 1868	36th 37th 38th 39th 40th	Civil War and Reconstruction	
Christopher C. Bowen (Charleston)	Republican	July 20, 1868 – March 3, 1871	40th 41st	Elected to finish the short term. Also elected to the next term. Lost re-election.	1868–1873 [data missing]
Robert C. De Large (Charleston)	Republican	March 4, 1871 – January 24, 1873	42nd	Elected in 1870. Seat declared vacant.	1868–1873 [data missing]
Vacant		January 24, 1873 – March 3, 1873	42nd		1868–1873 [data missing]
Alonzo J. Ransier (Charleston)	Republican	March 4, 1873 – March 3, 1875	43rd	Elected in 1872. Retired.	1873–1883 [data missing]
Edmund W.M. Mackey (Charleston)	Independent Republican	March 4, 1875 – July 19, 1876	44th	Elected in 1874. Seat declared vacant.	1873–1883 [data missing]
Vacant		July 19, 1876 – November 7, 1876	44th		1873–1883 [data missing]
Charles W. Buttz (Charleston)	Republican	November 7, 1876 – March 3, 1877	44th	Elected to finish Mackey's term. Retired.	1873–1883 [data missing]
Richard H. Cain (Charleston)	Republican	March 4, 1877 – March 3, 1879	45th	Elected in 1876. Retired.	1873–1883 [data missing]
Michael P. O'Connor (Charleston)	Democratic	March 4, 1879 – April 26, 1881	46th 47th	Elected in 1878. Re-elected in 1880. Died pending an election contest.	1873–1883 [data missing]
Vacant		April 26, 1881 – June 9, 1881	47th		1873–1883 [data missing]
Samuel Dibble (Orangeburg)	Democratic	June 9, 1881 – May 31, 1882	47th	Elected to finish O'Connor's term. Lost the election contest.	1873–1883 [data missing]
Edmund W.M. Mackey (Charleston)	Republican	May 31, 1882 – March 3, 1883	47th	Won election contest. Redistricted to the 7th district.	1873–1883 [data missing]
George D. Tillman (Clarks Hill)	Democratic	March 4, 1883 – March 3, 1893	48th 49th 50th 51st 52nd	Elected in 1882. Re-elected in 1884. Re-elected in 1886. Re-elected in 1888. Re-elected in 1890. Lost renomination.	1883–1893 [data missing]
W. Jasper Talbert (Parksville)	Democratic	March 4, 1893 – March 3, 1903	53rd 54th 55th 56th 57th	Elected in 1892. Re-elected in 1894. Re-elected in 1896. Re-elected in 1898. Re-elected in 1900. Retired to run for governor of South Carolina.	1893–1903 [data missing]
George W. Croft (Aiken)	Democratic	March 4, 1903 – March 10, 1904	58th	Elected in 1902. Died.	1903–1913 [data missing]
Vacant		March 10, 1904 – May 17, 1904	58th		1903–1913 [data missing]
Theodore G. Croft (Aiken)	Democratic	May 17, 1904 – March 3, 1905	58th	Elected to finish his father's term. Retired.	1903–1913 [data missing]
James O'H. Patterson (Barnwell)	Democratic	March 4, 1905 – March 3, 1911	59th 60th 61st	Elected in 1904. Re-elected in 1906. Re-elected in 1908. Retired.	1903–1913 [data missing]
James F. Byrnes (Aiken)	Democratic	March 4, 1911 – March 3, 1925	62nd 63rd 64th 65th 66th 67th 68th	Elected in 1910. Re-elected in 1912. Re-elected in 1914. Re-elected in 1916. Re-elected in 1918. Re-elected in 1920. Re-elected in 1922. Retired to run for U.S. senator.	1903–1913 [data missing]
James F. Byrnes (Aiken)	Democratic	March 4, 1911 – March 3, 1925	62nd 63rd 64th 65th 66th 67th 68th	Elected in 1910. Re-elected in 1912. Re-elected in 1914. Re-elected in 1916. Re-elected in 1918. Re-elected in 1920. Re-elected in 1922. Retired to run for U.S. senator.	1913–1933; Aiken, Bamberg, Barnwell, Beaufort, Edgefield, Hampton, Jasper, and Saluda counties
Butler B. Hare (Saluda)	Democratic	March 4, 1925 – March 3, 1933	69th 70th 71st 72nd	Elected in 1924. Re-elected in 1926. Re-elected in 1928. Re-elected in 1930. Retired.	1913–1933; Aiken, Bamberg, Barnwell, Beaufort, Edgefield, Hampton, Jasper, and Saluda counties
Hampton Fulmer (Orangeburg)	Democratic	March 4, 1933 – October 19, 1944	73rd 74th 75th 76th 77th 78th	Redistricted from the 7th district and re-elected in 1932. Re-elected in 1934. Re-elected in 1936. Re-elected in 1938. Re-elected in 1940. Re-elected in 1942. Died.	1933–1943 [data missing]
Hampton Fulmer (Orangeburg)	Democratic	March 4, 1933 – October 19, 1944	73rd 74th 75th 76th 77th 78th	Redistricted from the 7th district and re-elected in 1932. Re-elected in 1934. Re-elected in 1936. Re-elected in 1938. Re-elected in 1940. Re-elected in 1942. Died.	1943–1953 [data missing]
Vacant		October 19, 1944 – November 7, 1944	78th		1943–1953 [data missing]
Willa L. Fulmer (Orangeburg)	Democratic	November 7, 1944 – January 3, 1945	78th	Elected to finish her husband's term. Retired.	1943–1953 [data missing]
John J. Riley (Sumter)	Democratic	January 3, 1945 – January 3, 1949	79th 80th	Elected in 1944. Re-elected in 1946. Lost renomination.	1943–1953 [data missing]
Hugo S. Sims Jr. (Orangeburg)	Democratic	January 3, 1949 – January 3, 1951	81st	Elected in 1948. Lost renomination.	1943–1953 [data missing]
John J. Riley (Sumter)	Democratic	January 3, 1951 – January 1, 1962	82nd 83rd 84th 85th 86th 87th	Elected in 1950. Re-elected in 1952. Re-elected in 1954. Re-elected in 1956. Re-elected in 1958. Re-elected in 1960. Died.	1943–1953 [data missing]
John J. Riley (Sumter)	Democratic	January 3, 1951 – January 1, 1962	82nd 83rd 84th 85th 86th 87th	Elected in 1950. Re-elected in 1952. Re-elected in 1954. Re-elected in 1956. Re-elected in 1958. Re-elected in 1960. Died.	1953–1963 [data missing]
Vacant		January 1, 1962 – April 10, 1962	87th		1953–1963 [data missing]
Corinne Boyd Riley (Sumter)	Democratic	April 10, 1962 – January 3, 1963	87th	Elected to finish her husband's term. Retired.	1953–1963 [data missing]
Albert Watson (Columbia)	Democratic	January 3, 1963 – February 1, 1965	88th 89th	Elected in 1962. Re-elected in 1964. Resigned to contest special election as a Republican.	1963–1973 [data missing]
Vacant		February 1, 1965 – June 15, 1965	89th		1963–1973 [data missing]
Albert Watson (Columbia)	Republican	June 15, 1965 – January 3, 1971	89th 90th 91st	Re-elected to finish his term as a Republican. Re-elected in 1966. Re-elected in 1968. Retired to run for governor.	1963–1973 [data missing]
Floyd Spence (Lexington)	Republican	January 3, 1971 – August 16, 2001	92nd 93rd 94th 95th 96th 97th 98th 99th 100th 101st 102nd 103rd 104th 105th 106th 107th	Elected in 1970. Re-elected in 1972. Re-elected in 1974. Re-elected in 1976. Re-elected in 1978. Re-elected in 1980. Re-elected in 1982. Re-elected in 1984. Re-elected in 1986. Re-elected in 1988. Re-elected in 1990. Re-elected in 1992. Re-elected in 1994. Re-elected in 1996. Re-elected in 1998. Re-elected in 2000. Died.	1963–1973 [data missing]
Floyd Spence (Lexington)	Republican	January 3, 1971 – August 16, 2001	92nd 93rd 94th 95th 96th 97th 98th 99th 100th 101st 102nd 103rd 104th 105th 106th 107th	Elected in 1970. Re-elected in 1972. Re-elected in 1974. Re-elected in 1976. Re-elected in 1978. Re-elected in 1980. Re-elected in 1982. Re-elected in 1984. Re-elected in 1986. Re-elected in 1988. Re-elected in 1990. Re-elected in 1992. Re-elected in 1994. Re-elected in 1996. Re-elected in 1998. Re-elected in 2000. Died.	1973–1983: [data missing]
Floyd Spence (Lexington)	Republican	January 3, 1971 – August 16, 2001	92nd 93rd 94th 95th 96th 97th 98th 99th 100th 101st 102nd 103rd 104th 105th 106th 107th	Elected in 1970. Re-elected in 1972. Re-elected in 1974. Re-elected in 1976. Re-elected in 1978. Re-elected in 1980. Re-elected in 1982. Re-elected in 1984. Re-elected in 1986. Re-elected in 1988. Re-elected in 1990. Re-elected in 1992. Re-elected in 1994. Re-elected in 1996. Re-elected in 1998. Re-elected in 2000. Died.	1983–1993: [data missing]
Floyd Spence (Lexington)	Republican	January 3, 1971 – August 16, 2001	92nd 93rd 94th 95th 96th 97th 98th 99th 100th 101st 102nd 103rd 104th 105th 106th 107th	Elected in 1970. Re-elected in 1972. Re-elected in 1974. Re-elected in 1976. Re-elected in 1978. Re-elected in 1980. Re-elected in 1982. Re-elected in 1984. Re-elected in 1986. Re-elected in 1988. Re-elected in 1990. Re-elected in 1992. Re-elected in 1994. Re-elected in 1996. Re-elected in 1998. Re-elected in 2000. Died.	1993–2003 [data missing]
Vacant		August 16, 2001 – December 18, 2001	107th		1993–2003 [data missing]
Joe Wilson (Springdale)	Republican	December 18, 2001 – present	107th 108th 109th 110th 111th 112th 113th 114th 115th 116th 117th 118th 119th	Elected to finish Spence's term. Re-elected in 2002. Re-elected in 2004. Re-elected in 2006. Re-elected in 2008. Re-elected in 2010. Re-elected in 2012. Re-elected in 2014. Re-elected in 2016. Re-elected in 2018. Re-elected in 2020. Re-elected in 2022. Re-elected in 2024. Re-elected in 2026.	1993–2003 [data missing]
Joe Wilson (Springdale)	Republican	December 18, 2001 – present	107th 108th 109th 110th 111th 112th 113th 114th 115th 116th 117th 118th 119th	Elected to finish Spence's term. Re-elected in 2002. Re-elected in 2004. Re-elected in 2006. Re-elected in 2008. Re-elected in 2010. Re-elected in 2012. Re-elected in 2014. Re-elected in 2016. Re-elected in 2018. Re-elected in 2020. Re-elected in 2022. Re-elected in 2024. Re-elected in 2026.	2003–2013
Joe Wilson (Springdale)	Republican	December 18, 2001 – present	107th 108th 109th 110th 111th 112th 113th 114th 115th 116th 117th 118th 119th	Elected to finish Spence's term. Re-elected in 2002. Re-elected in 2004. Re-elected in 2006. Re-elected in 2008. Re-elected in 2010. Re-elected in 2012. Re-elected in 2014. Re-elected in 2016. Re-elected in 2018. Re-elected in 2020. Re-elected in 2022. Re-elected in 2024. Re-elected in 2026.	2013–2023
Joe Wilson (Springdale)	Republican	December 18, 2001 – present	107th 108th 109th 110th 111th 112th 113th 114th 115th 116th 117th 118th 119th	Elected to finish Spence's term. Re-elected in 2002. Re-elected in 2004. Re-elected in 2006. Re-elected in 2008. Re-elected in 2010. Re-elected in 2012. Re-elected in 2014. Re-elected in 2016. Re-elected in 2018. Re-elected in 2020. Re-elected in 2022. Re-elected in 2024. Re-elected in 2026.	2023–2033

== Past election results ==
=== 2012 ===
2012 South Carolina's 2nd congressional district election
Party	Candidate	Votes	%
Republican	Joe Wilson (incumbent)	196,116	96.3
Write-in		7,602	3.7
Total votes		203,718	100.0
Republican hold			

=== 2014 ===
2014 South Carolina's 2nd congressional district election
Party	Candidate	Votes	%
Republican	Joe Wilson (incumbent)	121,649	62.5
Democratic	Phil Black	68,719	35.3
Labor	Harold Geddings III	4,158	2.1
Write-in		282	0.1
Total votes		194,808	100.0
Republican hold			

=== 2016 ===
2016 South Carolina's 2nd congressional district election
Party	Candidate	Votes	%
Republican	Joe Wilson (incumbent)	183,746	60.2
Democratic	Arik Bjorn	109,452	35.9
American	Eddie McCain	11,444	3.8
Write-in		354	0.1
Total votes		304,996	100.0
Republican hold			

=== 2018 ===
2018 South Carolina's 2nd congressional district election
Party	Candidate	Votes	%
Republican	Joe Wilson (incumbent)	144,642	56.2
Democratic	Sean Carrigan	109,199	42.5
American	Sonny Narang	3,111	1.2
Write-in		187	0.1
Total votes		257,139	100.0
Republican hold			

=== 2020 ===
2020 South Carolina's 2nd congressional district election
Party	Candidate	Votes	%
Republican	Joe Wilson (incumbent)	202,715	55.7
Democratic	Adair Boroughs	155,118	42.6
Constitution	Kathleen Wright	6,163	1.7
Write-in		219	0.1
Total votes		364,215	100.0
Republican hold			

=== 2022 ===
2022 South Carolina's 2nd congressional district election
Party	Candidate	Votes	%
Republican	Joe Wilson (incumbent)	147,699	60.0
Democratic	Judd Larkins	98,081	39.8
Write-in		346	0.1
Total votes		246,126	100.0
Republican hold			

=== 2024 ===
2024 South Carolina's 2nd congressional district election
Party	Candidate	Votes	%
Republican	Joe Wilson (incumbent)	211,514	59.5
Democratic	David Robinson	142,985	40.3
Write-in		786	0.2
Total votes		355,285	100.0
Republican hold			

== See also ==
- List of United States congressional districts
- South Carolina's congressional districts
