= George Spencer-Churchill =

George Spencer-Churchill may refer to:

- George Spencer-Churchill, 5th Duke of Marlborough (1766–1840)
- George Spencer-Churchill, 6th Duke of Marlborough (1793–1857)
- George Spencer-Churchill, 8th Duke of Marlborough (1844–1892)
- George Spencer-Churchill, Marquess of Blandford (born 1992), elder son of Charles, 12th Duke of Marlborough, oldest surviving son of John, 11th Duke of Marlborough

== See also ==
- George Spencer (disambiguation)
- George Churchill (disambiguation)
