= Corinne Boyd Riley =

American politician (1893–1979)

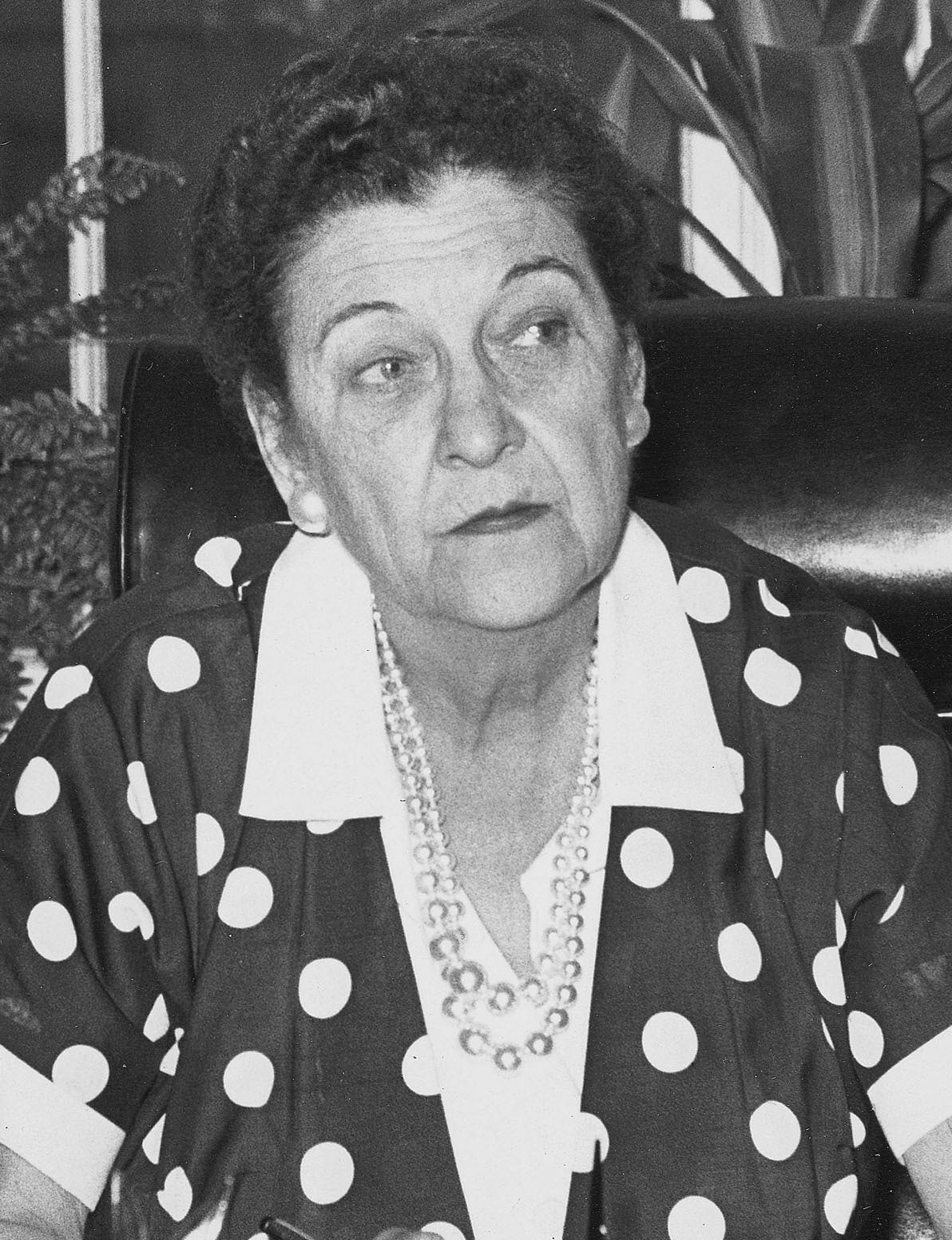

Member of the U.S. House of Representatives from South Carolina's 2nd district
- In office April 10, 1962 – January 3, 1963
- Preceded by: John Jacob Riley
- Succeeded by: Albert Watson

Personal details
- Born: July 4, 1893 Piedmont, South Carolina
- Died: April 12, 1979 (aged 85) Sumter, South Carolina
- Resting place: Sumter, South Carolina
- Party: Democratic
- Spouse: John Jacob Riley
- Education: Converse College
- Profession: teacher

Corinne Boyd Riley (July 4, 1893 – April 12, 1979) was a U.S. representative from South Carolina, wife of John Jacob Riley.

Born in Piedmont, South Carolina, Riley attended public school. She graduated from Converse College, Spartanburg, South Carolina, 1915. She was a teacher. Served as field representative of the South Carolina State Text Book Commission from 1938 to 1942. Riley was associated with the Civilian Personnel Office at Shaw Air Force Base in Sumter, South Carolina during World War II, from 1942 to 1944.

Riley was elected as a Democrat to the Eighty-seventh Congress, by special election to fill the vacancy caused by the death of United States Representative her husband, John Jacob Riley, a World War I veteran, and served from April 10, 1962, to January 3, 1963. Her opponent in the Democratic primary was state legislator Martha Thomas Fitzgerald; it was believed to be the first time in South Carolina history that two women had competed against each other in a congressional election. She was not a candidate for reelection to the Eighty-eighth Congress in 1962. She retired and died on April 12, 1979, in Sumter, South Carolina. Her remains were cremated; her ashes interred in Sumter Cemetery, South Carolina.

== See also ==
- Women in the United States House of Representatives

== Sources ==
- United States Congress. "Corinne Boyd Riley (id: R000259)". Biographical Directory of the United States Congress.

U.S. House of Representatives
Preceded by John Jacob Riley	Member of the U.S. House of Representatives from South Carolina's 2nd congressional district 1962-1963	Succeeded by Albert Watson
