= 1970 South Carolina Amendment 1 =

Referendum removing requirement of being male to vote

- November 3, 1970
- Shall Section 3 of Article II of the Constitution of this State be amended so as to delete the word 'male' as a requirement to be an elector in this State?

Results
Choice	Votes	%
Yes	182,327	76.75%
No	55,243	23.25%
Yes
80%–90%
70%–80%
60%–70%
50%–60%

1970 South Carolina Amendment 1 was a proposed amendment to the Constitution of South Carolina to repeal the defunct provision requiring a voter to be a male. The amendment was symbolic, as the Nineteenth Amendment to the United States Constitution had granted women the right to vote in 1920. The ballot measure passed with over 76% of the vote in favor, and with the support of all 46 counties.

== Background ==
During the 1868 State Constitutional Convention, the first official move to grant women suffrage in South Carolina was made. William Whipper, who was a black Republican politician, proposed that the suffrage requirements in the state constitution be amended to remove the word "male". The Convention did not take up his suggestion.

On March 13, 1872, Whipper and other suffrage activists who were members of the Republican Party made another attempt to pass universal suffrage in the state. A joint committee from both the state House and Senate, which included Whipper and Alonzo Ransier, a fellow black Republican who was formerly the state's Lieutenant Governor, suggested a state-level constitutional amendment to allow that "every person, male or female, possessed of the necessary qualifications, should be entitled to vote." The state legislature rejected the amendment. After rejection, the idea of women's suffrage was largely abandoned throughout public forums in South Carolina until the 1880s.

In January 1920, the South Carolina General Assembly declined to ratify the Nineteenth Amendment, a change to the United States Constitution granting women the right to vote. The State House voted 93 to 21 to reject the amendment, and the State Senate did so 32 to 3.

After the Nineteenth Amendment had been federally ratified, South Carolina's legislature reluctantly agreed by passing a statute granting the right to vote to women. However, they simultaneously passed a law prohibiting women from taking part in jury duty.

In 1969, the state ratified the Nineteenth Amendment, to which Eulalie Salley, who was once the organizer and president of the Aiken Equal Suffrage League, and, in 1919, the South Carolina Equal Suffrage League president, said, when standing behind the governor when it was ratified, "Boys, I've been waiting for fifty years to tell you what I think of you."

== Contents ==
The following question and information was shown to voters for the measure:

"NO. 1

Shall Section 3 of Article II of the Constitution of this State be amended so as to delete the word 'male' as a requirement to be an elector in this State?

In favor of the amendment []

Opposed to the amendment []

Those voting in favor of the amendment shall deposit a ballot with a check or cross mark in the square after the words 'In favor of the amendment', and those voting against the amendment shall deposit a ballot with a check or cross mark in the square after the words 'Opposed to the amendment'."

== Results ==
County	Yes		No	
County	#	%	#	%
Abbeville	1,557	67.81	739	32.19
Aiken	9,155	81.05	2,141	18.95
Allendale	809	77.64	233	22.36
Anderson	7,391	70.17	3,142	29.83
Bamberg	781	83.44	155	16.56
Barnwell	1,642	76.19	513	23.81
Beaufort	2,649	81.76	591	18.24
Berkeley	2,600	85.25	450	14.75
Calhoun	360	70.18	153	29.82
Charleston	15,035	80.66	3,605	19.34
Cherokee	2,844	77.77	813	22.23
Chester	2,225	77.10	661	22.90
Chesterfield	2,080	68.22	969	31.78
Clarendon	1,488	76.94	446	23.06
Colleton	2,041	70.62	849	29.38
Darlington	3,015	77.61	870	22.39
Dillon	1,583	80.23	390	19.77
Dorchester	2,228	77.47	648	22.53
Edgefield	1,245	71.47	497	28.53
Fairfield	1,685	76.80	509	23.20
Florence	4,905	76.19	1,533	23.81
Georgetown	1,759	81.47	400	18.53
Greenville	18,568	76.04	5,852	23.96
Greenwood	3,411	81.54	772	18.46
Hampton	1,316	84.25	246	15.75
Horry	3,834	76.83	1,156	23.17
Jasper	318	79.10	84	20.90
Kershaw	3,445	73.41	1,248	26.59
Lancaster	3,643	77.81	1,039	22.19
Laurens	3,202	69.43	1,410	30.57
Lee	599	86.81	91	13.19
Lexington	8,528	74.89	2,859	25.11
Marion	1,042	66.54	524	33.46
Marlboro	813	78.93	217	21.07
McCormick	824	86.37	130	13.63
Newberry	3,672	69.31	1,626	30.69
Oconee	1,722	59.75	1,160	40.25
Orangeburg	2,012	57.70	1,475	42.30
Pickens	4,219	77.20	1,246	22.80
Richland	21,713	83.28	4,360	16.72
Saluda	1,762	70.12	751	29.88
Spartanburg	14,648	82.29	3,152	17.71
Sumter	4,808	76.10	1,510	23.90
Union	1,794	66.72	895	33.28
Williamsburg	1,770	72.54	670	27.46
York	5,587	79.43	1,447	20.57
Total	182,327	77.08	54,227	22.92

== See also ==
- Women's suffrage in the United States
