= Willa L. Fulmer =

American politician (1884–1968)

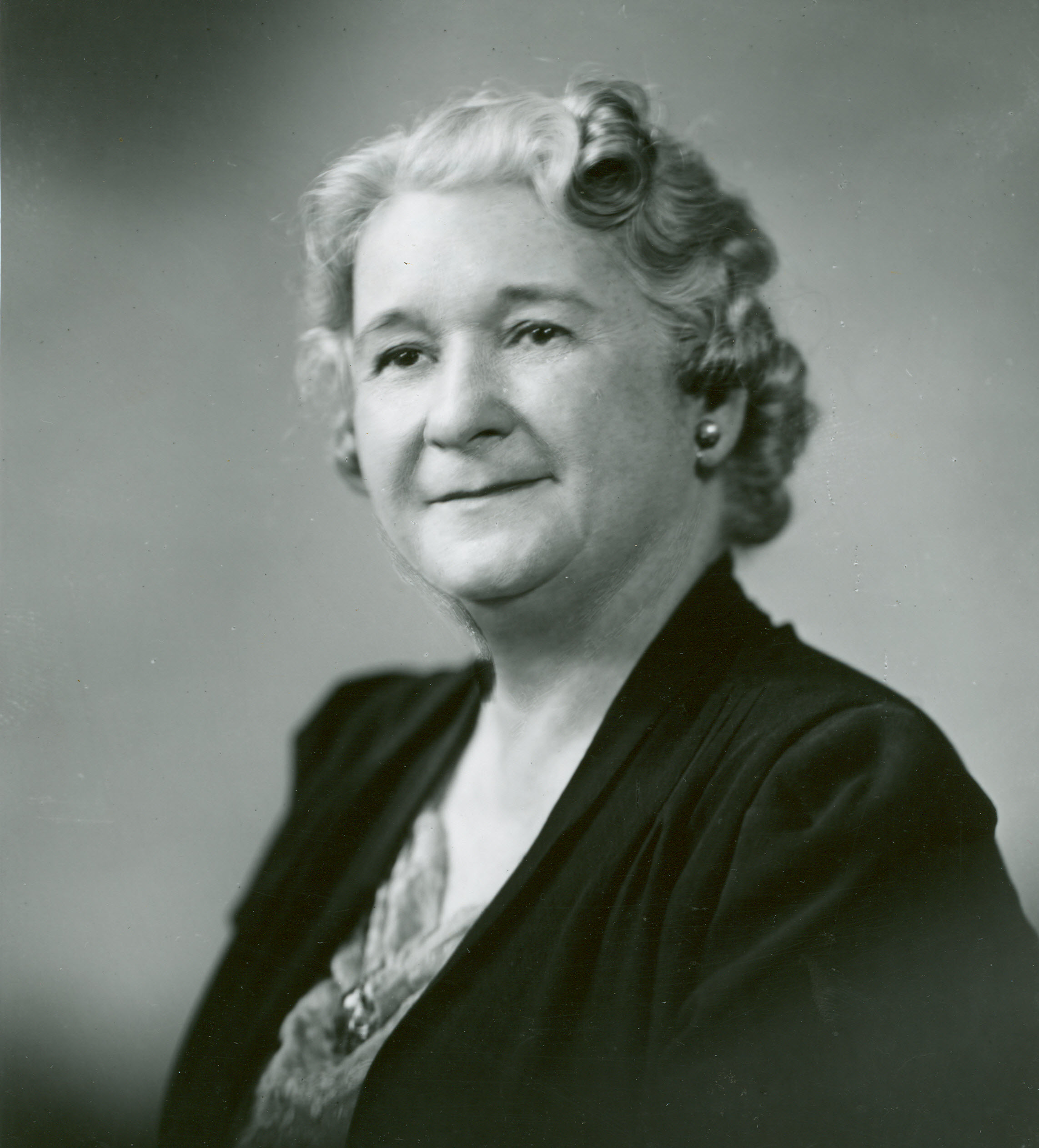

Member of the U.S. House of Representatives from South Carolina's 2nd district
- In office November 7, 1944 – January 3, 1945
- Preceded by: Hampton P. Fulmer
- Succeeded by: John J. Riley

Personal details
- Born: Willa Essie Lybrand; February 3, 1884 Wagener, South Carolina, U.S.
- Died: May 13, 1968 (aged 84) North Atlantic Ocean, aboard a ship en route to Europe
- Resting place: Orangeburg, South Carolina
- Party: Democratic
- Spouse: Hampton P. Fulmer
- Education: Greenville (Baptist) Female College
- Occupation: Politician

Willa Lybrand Fulmer (born Willa Essie Lybrand; February 3, 1884 – May 13, 1968) was an American politician. A Democrat, she was a lame duck member of the United States House of Representatives from South Carolina. She was the wife of politician Hampton P. Fulmer.

== Early life ==
Fulmer was born on February 3, 1884, in Wagener, South Carolina. She attended public schools in Wagener, then studied at Greenville Female College. On October 20, 1901, she married politician Hampton P. Fulmer. She lived in Orangeburg.

== Career ==
Fulmer was a Democrat. Following the death of her husband, she succeeded him in the United States House of Representatives after winning an unopposed election with 7,943 votes. She was sworn into office before the election credentials arrived in Washington, D.C., so Speaker Sam Rayburn controversially performed the oath early.

Fulmer served from November 7, 1944, to January 3, 1945, representing South Carolina's 2nd district. During her tenure, she lived in the Cannon House Office Building and made no speeches and was not appointed to any House Committees. On December 4 or 5, she introduced three bills: two regarding cotton farming, and one granting reparation for a wife of a man who was killed by a United States Army truck in Charleston. She did not run for re-election. Her tenure lasted a total of 58 days. Politically, The Washington Post described her as more of a Southern gentlewoman, with her knowledge of politics coming as a surprise.

== Later life and death ==
After serving in Congress, Fulmer remained in Washington D.C. She operated a farm in South Carolina until fully retiring. In her later life, she often traveled. She died on May 13, 1968, aged 80, while aborad a luxury ship in the North Atlantic that was en route to Europe. She was buried at Memorial Park Cemetery, in Orangeburg.

== See also ==
- Women in the United States House of Representatives

U.S. House of Representatives
Preceded by Hampton P. Fulmer	Member of the U.S. House of Representatives from South Carolina's 2nd congressional district 1944-1945	Succeeded by John J. Riley
