= Albert Watson (South Carolina politician) =

American politician (1922–1994)

Albert W. Watson
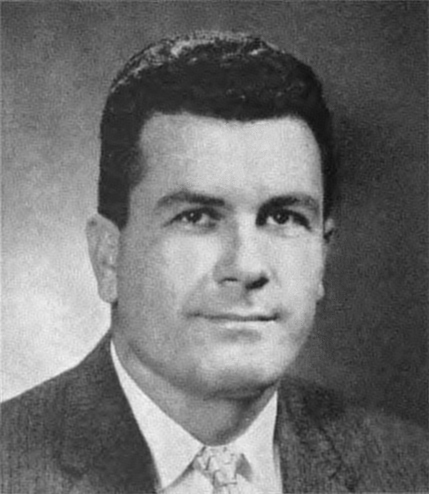

Member of the U.S. House of Representatives from South Carolina's 2nd district
- In office June 15, 1965 – January 3, 1971
- Preceded by: Himself
- Succeeded by: Floyd Spence
- In office January 3, 1963 – February 1, 1965
- Preceded by: Corinne Boyd Riley
- Succeeded by: Himself

Member of the South Carolina House of Representatives from Richland County
- In office January 10, 1961 – January 8, 1963
- In office January 11, 1955 – January 13, 1959

Personal details
- Born: August 30, 1922 Sumter, South Carolina, U.S.
- Died: September 25, 1994 (aged 72) Columbia, South Carolina, U.S.
- Resting place: Crescent Hill Memorial Gardens and Mausoleum; Columbia, South Carolina, U.S.
- Party: Democratic (1955–1965); Republican (1965–1994)
- Education: North Greenville Junior College; University of South Carolina School of Law
- Profession: Attorney

Military service
- Branch/service: United States Army Air Forces
- Battles/wars: World War II

Albert William Watson (August 30, 1922 – September 25, 1994) was an American politician, a Democrat-turned-Republican state and U.S. representative from South Carolina. He is best known for his losing 1970 campaign for governor of South Carolina, which has been described as the last high-profile, openly segregationist campaign in American politics.

== Background ==
Albert William Watson was born in 1922 to Claude Watson Sr. and his wife in Sumter in central South Carolina. His family moved and he was reared near the state capital of Columbia in Lexington County, where he attended public schools. He subsequently enrolled at the former North Greenville Junior College in Greenville, South Carolina. During World War II, Watson served as a weather specialist in the United States Army Air Forces.

In 1950, he graduated from the University of South Carolina School of Law and thereafter opened his legal practice in Columbia. In 1954, he was elected from Richland County to the South Carolina House of Representatives, which he served from 1955 to 1959 and again from 1961 to 1963.

In 1958, Watson lost the Democratic primary for lieutenant governor to Burnet Maybank, Jr., son of former U.S. Senator Burnet Maybank. In 1961, Watson returned to the state House for a final two-year term.

In 1948, Watson married the former Lillian Audrey Williams (1926-2023), and the couple had three children, Laura L. Watson, Albert Watson, Jr., and Clark P. Watson. A Southern Baptist deacon, Watson had a twin brother, Allan R. Watson (1922–2001), who was a Baptist minister and served as the pastor of churches in Florida and Alabama. He preached at the White House in September 1969. A second brother, Claude Watson Jr., of Columbia, died in 2003.

== Congressional career ==
In 1962, Watson first ran for South Carolina's 2nd congressional district seat in the U.S. House to fill the opening created when fellow Democrat John J. Riley died on New Year's Day. His wife, Corinne Boyd Riley, had won a special election to serve out the remainder of the term, but did not run for a full term in November. After securing the Democratic nomination, Watson faced Floyd Spence, a fellow state representative from neighboring Lexington County, who had turned Republican a few months earlier. The ensuing general election was far closer than expected, with Watson winning by only five percentage points. He received crucial support from his mentor, U.S. Senator Strom Thurmond.

Like Thurmond, Watson was an open and unashamed segregationist. Both supported Barry Goldwater's campaign for President. While Watson headed the South Carolina "Democrats for Goldwater" organization, Thurmond went as far as switching parties and becoming a Republican on September 17, 1964. Partly because of his support for Goldwater, Watson was reelected without opposition as Goldwater carried South Carolina, the first Republican to have done so since Rutherford B. Hayes in 1876. The House Democratic Caucus stripped Watson of his seniority for supporting Goldwater. Another Deep South congressman, John Bell Williams of Mississippi, lost his seniority for supporting Goldwater as well. Declaring he would "not sit around and be bullied by northern liberals," Watson resigned from Congress on February 1, 1965. He then announced that he would run in the special election for his old seat on June 15, 1965—as a Republican.

Watson won the special election with 59.1 percent of the vote to become the first Republican to represent South Carolina in the House since 1896, and the first Republican to win a disputed House election in the state since Reconstruction. It was a different Republican Party in the South, however, as in 1965 most blacks in South Carolina were still effectively disenfranchised.

Watson was comfortably reelected in 1966 and 1968. Watson's opposition to civil rights legislation exceeded that of most other Southern Republicans. For instance, he was the only House Republican to vote against the Jury Selection Act of 1968, a civil rights measure intended to eliminate racial discrimination in jury selection.

== 1970 gubernatorial election ==
In 1970, Watson opted not to run for reelection, instead announcing his candidacy for governor. As a measure of how weak the Republicans were in South Carolina for most of the post-Reconstruction era, in most elections since losing the governorship in 1892 they hadn't even fielded a candidate. He won the nomination with a major assist from Thurmond. He faced strong competition from the Democratic nominee, Lieutenant Governor John C. West, originally from Camden. State and national Republicans were somewhat cool toward Watson because of his obstinate support for segregation. The Civil Rights Act of 1964 was intended to end segregation, and enforcement of the Voting Rights Act of 1965 meant that African Americans were re-entering the political system. Not a single daily newspaper endorsed Watson for governor.

Hastings Wyman took leave from his position as an aide to Senator Thurmond to serve as Watson's campaign manager.

=== Gubernatorial campaign ===
Watson's running mate was James Marvin Henderson Sr.

=== 1970 election results ===
Official results gave West 251,151 votes (52.1 percent) to Watson's 221,236 (45.9 percent). Red Bethea of the American Independent Party polled 9,758 votes (2 percent).

African-American voters in 1970 numbered 206,394, or 46 percent of the African-American voting-age population and 35 percent of the total registration.

Historians consider Watson's gubernatorial campaign to be the last openly segregationist campaign in South Carolina and one of the last in the South as a whole. Watson was succeeded in the House by Spence, who had nearly won the seat in 1962. Spence went on to hold the seat for thirty years.

== Later years ==
In 1971, Thurmond asked Nixon to appoint Albert Watson to the United States Court of Military Appeals, but Democratic U.S. Senator George McGovern of South Dakota opposed him. The next year McGovern became Nixon's general election opponent.

Watson died in Columbia at the age of 72 in 1994. He is interred there at Crescent Hill Memorial Gardens and Mausoleum.

== See also ==
- List of members of the House Un-American Activities Committee
- List of United States representatives who switched parties

U.S. House of Representatives
Preceded by Corinne Boyd Riley	United States Representative from South Carolina's 2nd congressional district 1963–1971	Succeeded by Floyd Spence
Party political offices
Preceded by Joseph O. Rogers Jr. (1966)	Republican nominee for governor of South Carolina; 1970	Succeeded by James B. Edwards (1974)
