= Hugo S. Sims Jr. =

American politician (1921–2004)

Hugo Sheridan Sims Jr.
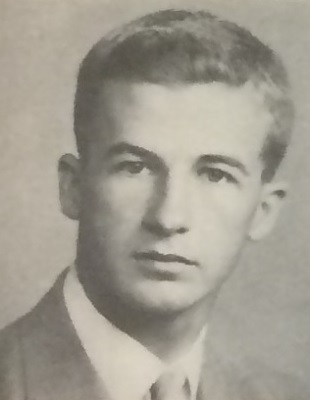

Member of the U.S. House of Representatives from South Carolina's 2nd district
- In office January 3, 1949 – January 3, 1951
- Preceded by: John J. Riley
- Succeeded by: John J. Riley

Member of the South Carolina House of Representatives from Orangeburg County
- In office January 14, 1947 – April 15, 1948

Personal details
- Born: October 14, 1921 Orangeburg, South Carolina
- Died: July 9, 2004 (aged 82) Orangeburg, South Carolina
- Resting place: Orangeburg, South Carolina
- Party: Democratic
- Education: Wofford College (B.A.); University of South Carolina School of Law (J.D.)
- Profession: Lawyer, businessman, journalist
- Awards: Silver Star, Distinguished Service Cross

Military service
- Allegiance: United States
- Branch/service: United States Army
- Years of service: 1942–1945, 1951
- Rank: Captain
- Battles/wars: Second World War

Hugo Sheridan Sims Jr. (October 14, 1921 – July 9, 2004) was a U.S. representative from South Carolina.

== Early life ==
Born in Orangeburg, South Carolina, Sims attended the public schools. He graduated from Wofford College, Spartanburg, South Carolina in 1941. After graduation, he was editor of the Times and Democrat, the daily newspaper of Orangeburg from 1941 to 1942.

He served in the United States Army from 1942 to 1945, commanding Company A, 501st Parachute Infantry, 101st Airborne Division, while serving in the Second World War. During his service, he was awarded the Distinguished Service Cross and Silver Star.

After the war, he graduated from the law school of the University of South Carolina in 1947 and was a lawyer in private practice.

== Political career ==
He served as member of the South Carolina House of Representatives from 1947 to 1948. He then defeated incumbent John J. Riley for the Democratic nomination to Congress from the Second District. He was elected to the Eighty-first Congress. However, he lost the Democratic nomination to Riley in 1950, who went on to regain the Congressional seat.

== Later life ==
Sims reentered the United States Army in 1951, and then resumed the practice of law from 1951 to 1965. He served as president of the Management and Investment Corporation from 1965 to 1983.

He died on July 9, 2004, in Orangeburg, South Carolina, and is interred in Memorial Park Cemetery in Orangeburg.

== Sources ==
- United States Congress. "Hugo S. Sims Jr. (id: S000439)". Biographical Directory of the United States Congress.

U.S. House of Representatives
Preceded by John J. Riley	Member of the U.S. House of Representatives from South Carolina's 2nd congressional district 1949–1951	Succeeded by John J. Riley
