= James Butler Hare =

American politician (1918–1966)

Member of the U.S. House of Representatives from South Carolina's 3rd district
- In office January 3, 1949 – January 3, 1951
- Preceded by: William Jennings Bryan Dorn
- Succeeded by: William Jennings Bryan Dorn

Personal details
- Born: September 4, 1918 Saluda, South Carolina
- Died: July 16, 1966 (aged 47) Columbia, South Carolina
- Resting place: Saluda, South Carolina
- Party: Democratic
- Education: Newberry College; Erskine College
- Profession: Attorney

Military service
- Allegiance: United States of America
- Branch/service: United States Navy
- Years of service: 1940 – 1946; 1950 – 1952
- Rank: Commander
- Battles/wars: World War II Pacific Theater; Korean War

James Butler Hare (September 4, 1918 – July 16, 1966) was elected to the U.S. House of Representatives for South Carolina's 3rd congressional district. He served for one term from 1949 to 1951.

== Biography ==
He was born in Saluda, South Carolina on September 4, 1918. He was the son of Butler B. Hare, who had also represented this district from 1939 to 1947. He attended the public schools, graduated from Newberry College in 1939, and did postgraduate work at Erskine College in Due West, South Carolina. He enlisted in the United States Navy in August 1940 and was released to inactive duty in the Naval Reserve as a lieutenant commander in January, 1946 with thirty-two months in the Pacific Theater. He graduated from the law school of the University of South Carolina in 1947 and was admitted to the bar and commenced the practice of law in Saluda, South Carolina. He was a member of the board of trustees of the University of South Carolina. He was elected as a Democrat to the Eighty-first Congress (January 3, 1949 – January 3, 1951). He was an unsuccessful candidate for renomination in 1950. He was recalled to active duty in the United States Navy January 1, 1950, and served as a law specialist until released to inactive duty as a commander in May 1952. He resumed the practice of law in Saluda, S.C. He died in Columbia, South Carolina on July 16, 1966. He is interred in Travis Park Cemetery, Saluda, South Carolina.

U.S. House of Representatives
Preceded by William Jennings Bryan Dorn	Member of the U.S. House of Representatives from South Carolina's 3rd congressional district 1949 – 1951	Succeeded by William Jennings Bryan Dorn
