= George Austin Spencer =

American attorney and Missouri state legislator

George Austin Spencer (February 5, 1906 – 1997) was an American attorney, farmer, and Democratic politician from Missouri. He represented Boone County in the Missouri House of Representatives (1947–1953) and the 19th District in the Missouri Senate (1953–1961), serving as Majority Floor Leader in the 69th and 70th General Assemblies. In 1960 he sought the Democratic nomination for Missouri Attorney General; Thomas F. Eagleton won the primary and later served as attorney general from 1961 to 1965.

== Early life and education ==
Spencer was born February 5, 1906, the son of Lyman L. and Mattie McGraw Spencer, and grew up on an 80-acre farm southeast of Centralia in Boone County, Missouri. In a 1996 oral-history interview, he recalled riding a horse about seven miles to Centralia High School and said he was the first student there to complete four full years of vocational agriculture. He was admitted to the Missouri bar in 1931 and received his LL.B. the following year from the University of Missouri School of Law.

== Legal and local public service ==
Spencer was elected Columbia city attorney for three consecutive terms (1933–1937) and later served two terms as Boone County prosecuting attorney (1942–1946).

== Missouri General Assembly ==
=== House of Representatives (1947–1953) ===
Spencer was elected in 1946 and re-elected in 1948 and 1950 to represent Boone County. A House Journal entry from May 19, 1947, places him on the floor during the 64th General Assembly.

=== Senate (1953–1961) ===
Elected to the Senate in 1952 and re-elected in 1956, Spencer represented the 19th District (Boone, Howard, Monroe, Ralls, and Randolph counties). He served as Majority Floor Leader during the 69th and 70th General Assemblies and chaired Agriculture and Rules & Joint Rules across multiple sessions. He worked on livestock-health measures and higher-education appropriations affecting the University of Missouri.

== 1960 attorney-general campaign and Thomas F. Eagleton ==
In 1960 Spencer ran for the Democratic nomination for attorney general. His principal opponent, Thomas F. Eagleton, then the St. Louis circuit attorney, won the primary and went on to be elected attorney general that November before later serving as lieutenant governor and U.S. senator.

== Later civic work ==
After leaving the Senate, Spencer practiced law in Columbia and served on Governor Warren E. Hearnes’s 1970 Task Force on the Role of Private Higher Education in Missouri. He was active in civic life; in 1973 the Columbia chapter of the National Secretaries Association named him “Boss of the Year.” He also bred and raced standardbreds; his pacer Golden Casco captured the Governor’s Trophy at the Missouri State Fair in Sedalia. Local businessmen, including Spencer, helped return J. W. “Blind” Boone’s historic Chickering grand piano to Columbia.

== Personal life ==
Spencer married Sarah Leta Jones, February 1, 1930. They had one child, Don Austin, born June 12, 1935. The Spencers resided on a farm two miles north of Columbia. He remained active in civic groups and agriculture. He died in 1997.
