= Floyd Spence =

American politician (1928–2001)

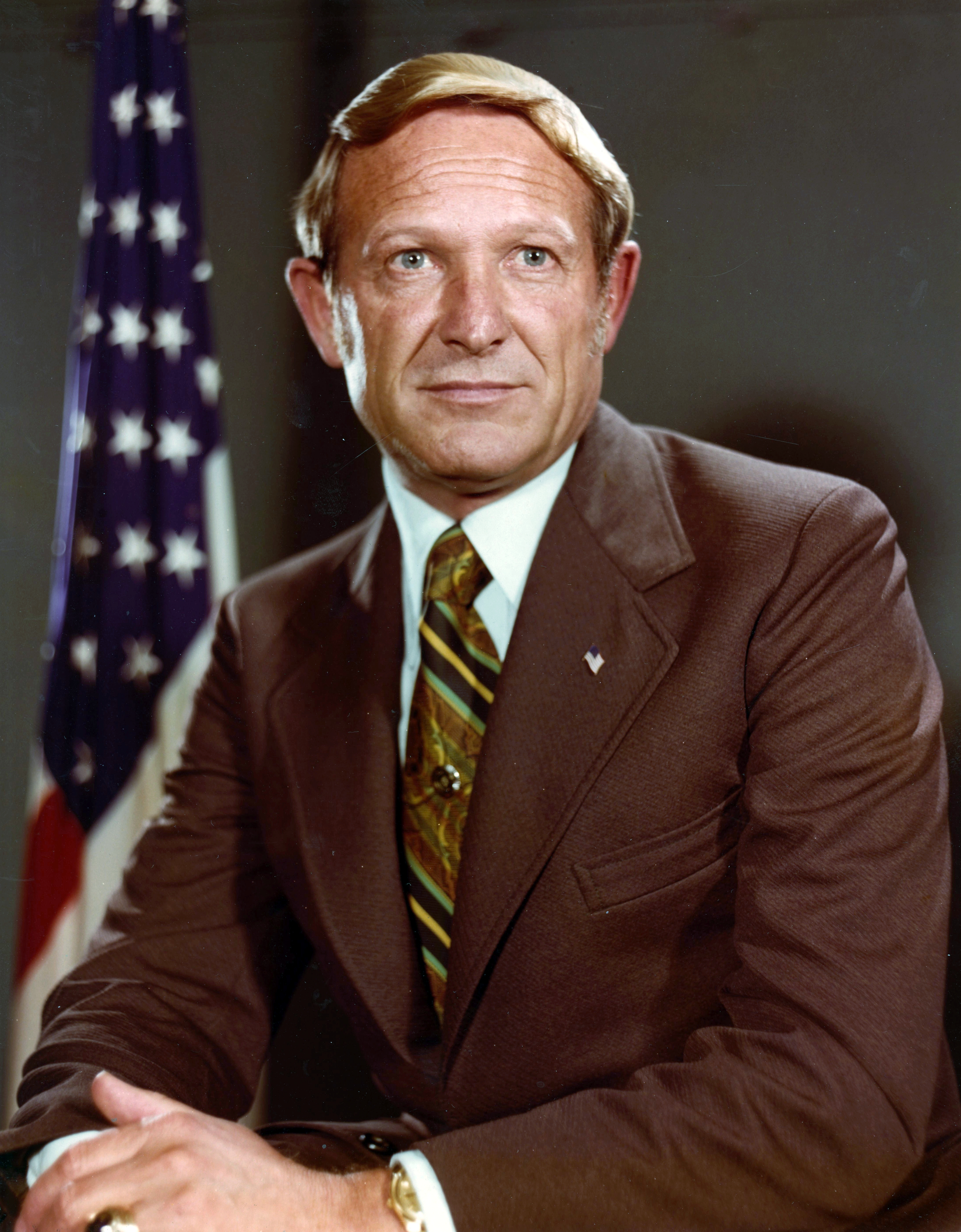
- Spence in 1976

Chair of the House National Security Committee
- In office January 3, 1995 – January 3, 2001
- Speaker: Newt Gingrich; Dennis Hastert
- Preceded by: Ron Dellums
- Succeeded by: Bob Stump

Member of the U.S. House of Representatives from South Carolina's 2nd district
- In office January 3, 1971 – August 16, 2001
- Preceded by: Albert William Watson
- Succeeded by: Joe Wilson

Member of the South Carolina Senate from the 7th district
- In office January 14, 1969 – December 15, 1970 Serving with Michael Lukens Laughlin, Gilbert Edward McMillen
- Preceded by: Frank Laney Roddey
- Succeeded by: Albert John Dooley

Member of the South Carolina Senate from the 22nd district
- In office January 10, 1967 – January 14, 1969 Serving with Eugene Cannon Griffith
- Preceded by: District created
- Succeeded by: District abolished

Member of the South Carolina House of Representatives from Lexington County
- In office January 8, 1957 – January 8, 1963 Serving with Pat Lindler, Ryan C. Shealy, Albert John Dooley
- Preceded by: Jack Reel Callison
- Succeeded by: Pat Lindler

Personal details
- Born: Floyd Davidson Spence; April 9, 1928 Columbia, South Carolina, U.S.
- Died: August 16, 2001 (aged 73) Jackson, Mississippi, U.S.
- Resting place: Saint Peter's Lutheran Cemetery, Lexington, South Carolina
- Party: Democratic (c. 1946–1962); Republican (1962–2001)
- Spouses: Lula Hancock Drake (m. 1952; died 1978) Deborah E. Williams (m. 1988)
- Children: 4
- Education: University of South Carolina (BA); University of South Carolina School of Law (JD)
- Profession: Attorney
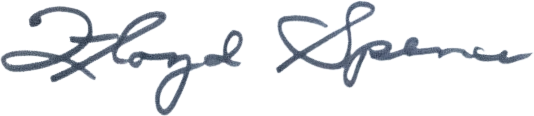
- Signature

Military service
- Branch/service: United States Navy; Naval Reserve
- Years of service: 1947–1988
- Rank: Captain
- Battles/wars: Korean War; Vietnam War
- Floyd Spence's voice Floyd Spence on modifications to the Nunn–Lugar Cooperative Threat Reduction program Recorded June 13, 1995

Floyd Davidson Spence (April 9, 1928 – August 16, 2001) was an American attorney and a politician from the U.S. state of South Carolina. Elected for three terms to the South Carolina House of Representatives from Lexington County as a Democrat, in 1962 Spence announced his decision to switch to the Republican Party, as he was unhappy with shifts in the national party.

He lost a contested seat that year for United States Representative from South Carolina's 2nd congressional district to Democrat Albert W. Watson, who had the support of powerful senator Strom Thurmond. Watson shifted to the Republican Party in 1965 and ran unsuccessfully for governor in 1970. That year Spence won the congressional seat, and was re-elected for fourteen subsequent terms, serving until his death in 2001. He became ranking Republican on the House Armed Services Committee in 1993 and chairman in 1995.

== Early life and education ==
Born in Columbia, the capital of South Carolina, Spence spent most of his life in nearby Lexington County. Shortly after graduating from high school, he enlisted in the United States Navy Reserve, from which he retired in 1988 as a captain. He graduated in 1952 from the University of South Carolina in Columbia with a degree in English. Four years later, he completed his Juris Doctor degree from the University of South Carolina School of Law.

== Political career ==
After law school, Spence joined the Democratic Party. He was elected to the South Carolina House of Representatives in 1956 as a Democrat from Lexington County. He was reelected in 1958 and 1960, but on April 14, 1962, Spence announced that he was switching to the Republican Party, having become uncomfortable with the national Democrats' increasingly liberal platform. He also opposed a loyalty oath required by South Carolina Democrats. He was the first Republican to serve in either house of the state legislature since Reconstruction–an example of the political realignment that had begun in South Carolina and in the entire South during the 20th century.

On the same day, he announced that he would seek the Republican nomination for the state's 2nd congressional district, based in Columbia.

He had been urged by several friends to run before his switch, especially after the death of the previous congressman, John J. Riley, but declined to do so. Spence faced the Democratic nominee, fellow state representative Albert W. Watson of Columbia. Watson won his party nomination with 52 percent of the vote over Frank C. Owens, the former mayor of Columbia and the choice of party regulars. Watson defeated Spence with 53 percent of the general election vote, the closest congressional race in South Carolina in memory. The 2nd had a conservative bent; the area's old-line Democrats had begun splitting their tickets in national elections as early as the 1940s. Watson's win was helped by the support of U.S. Senator Strom Thurmond, the former governor who had run for president in 1948 as the nominee of the one-election only third party, the States Rights Party, popularly known as the Dixiecrats.

In 1966, Spence was elected to the South Carolina Senate; he became the minority leader of a six-member caucus. He was reelected to the senate in 1968.

In 1970, Spence ran for the 2nd congressional district seat again. Watson had become a Republican in 1965, a year after Thurmond's own switch; he was giving up his congressional seat ran in 1970 for governor. He was defeated by the Democratic lieutenant governor, John C. West. Spence won a narrow victory, becoming the first freshman Republican congressman elected from South Carolina since 1896; he was the second Republican to be elected from the state since Reconstruction (Watson was the first, elected as an incumbent after his switch to the Republican Party). Both he and Watson represented conservative whites, rather than the majority African-American Republicans in South Carolina who had supported the party of Abraham Lincoln. Spence was unopposed for reelection in the Nixon-Agnew landslide of 1972 and reelected fourteen times thereafter. In 1974, Spence defeated challenger Matthew J. Perry, an African-American Democrat who had made his reputation in civil rights cases.

Aided by Ronald W. Reagan at the head of the Republican ticket, Spence was reelected in 1980 with 55 percent of the vote. After cruising to reelection in 1982 and 1984, Spence found his margin reduced to seven percent in 1986. That year Carroll Campbell became the second Republican to win the South Carolina governorship since Reconstruction. Spence faced another tough campaign in 1988, but did not face major-party opposition again until 1998.

== Congressional career ==
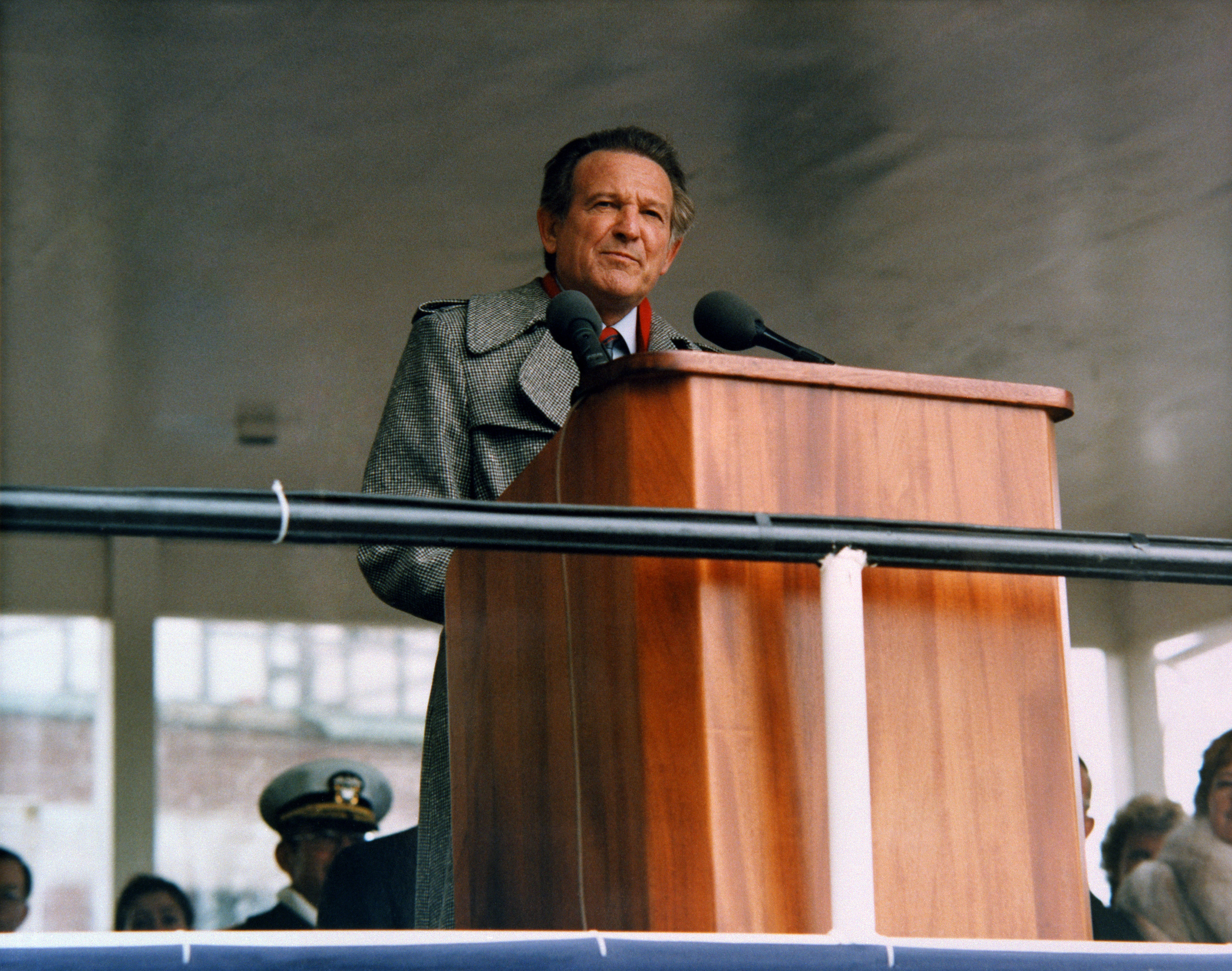
Spence speaks at the launch of USS Cowpens (CG-63), March 11, 1989

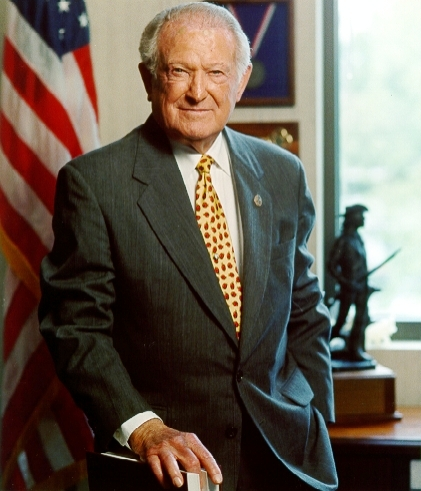
Spence later in his congressional career

For his first eleven terms, Spence represented a relatively compact district in the central portion of the state. Redistricting after the 1990 census resulted in shifting most of Spence's African-American constituents to the 6th District, which was reconfigured as a black-majority district. That district was taken by Columbia resident and state human affairs commissioner Jim Clyburn, who became the first Democrat to represent Columbia since Watson's party switch in 1965.

To compensate for this loss in population, Spence's district was pushed to the south and west, as far south as the resort city of Hilton Head Island and as far west as the fringes of the Augusta suburbs. By this time, the district had become very racially polarized, with African-American voters making up much of the Democratic base while whites supported Republicans. The loss of most of the district's black voters was a likely factor in the Democrats not running a candidate against Spence for most of the 1990s.

In 1993, Spence became the ranking Republican on the House Armed Services Committee, having been a member of the panel since his first term. The 2nd District includes Fort Jackson. He became the committee's chairman in 1995 after the Republicans under Newt Gingrich of Georgia gained their first majority in the House in forty years.

Spence renamed the House Armed Services Committee the "Committee on National Security" when he took over as chairman. He focused on military readiness, calling it "the best insurance we have both for peace and freedom." Spence was also a strong advocate of missile defense. He stepped down as chairman after the 106th Congress because of caucus-imposed term limits. He later served as chairman of the House subcommittee on military procurement.

== Personal life ==
Spence married his first wife, Lula Hancock Drake, on December 22, 1952. She died in 1978. They had four sons. On July 3, 1988, he married his second wife, Deborah E. Williams.

== Death and succession ==
Spence died at St. Dominic Memorial Hospital in Jackson, Mississippi, on August 16, 2001, at the age of seventy-three, from complications following brain surgery. He had been admitted to the hospital three weeks earlier for testing and treatment for nerve pain in his face. In 1988, he had received a double lung transplant at the University of Mississippi Medical Center. This standalone lung transplant (without heart transplant) was among the first in history, and at time of the procedure Spence was the oldest patient to have received it (at 60 years of age). At the time of his death 13 years after the lung transplant, he was the longest-surviving lung transplant patient without a re-transplant, and this was a record he had held for nearly 10 years. He was buried at the Saint Peters Lutheran Church Cemetery in Lexington, South Carolina.

Upon Spence's death, his former aide, Republican State Senator Joe Wilson, won the special election for the vacant seat.

== See also ==
- List of American politicians who switched parties in office
- List of members of the United States Congress who died in office (2000–present)#2000s

South Carolina House of Representatives
Preceded by Jack Reel Callison	Member from the Lexington County district January 8, 1957–January 8, 1963; Served alongside: Pat Lindler, Ryan C. Shealy, Albert John Dooley	Succeeded by Pat Lindler
South Carolina Senate
Preceded by District created	Member from the 22nd district January 10, 1967–January 14, 1969; Served alongside: Eugene Cannon Griffith	Succeeded by District abolished
Preceded by Frank Laney Roddey	Member from the 7th district January 14, 1969–December 15, 1970	Succeeded by Albert John Dooley
U.S. House of Representatives
Preceded by Albert Watson	Member from South Carolina's 2nd congressional district January 3, 1971–August 16, 2001	Succeeded by Joe Wilson
Political offices
Preceded by Ron Dellums; California	Chairman of the House National Security Committee; January 3, 1995–January 3, 2001	Succeeded by Bob Stump; Arizona
