= John J. Riley =

American politician

John Jacob Riley
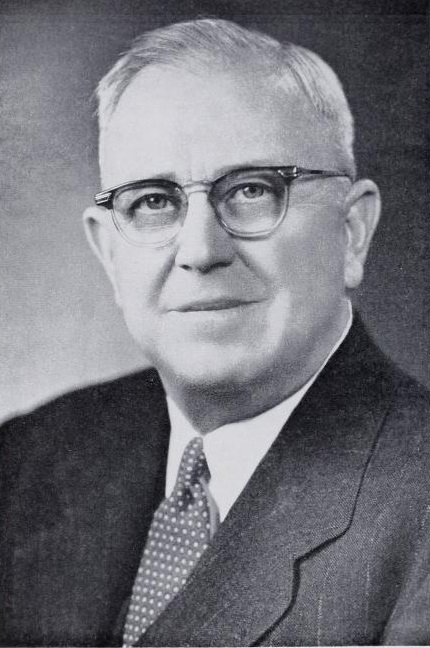

Member of the U.S. House of Representatives from South Carolina's 2nd district
- In office January 3, 1951 – January 1, 1962
- Preceded by: Hugo S. Sims, Jr.
- Succeeded by: Corinne Boyd Riley
- In office January 3, 1945 – January 3, 1949
- Preceded by: Willa L. Fulmer
- Succeeded by: Hugo S. Sims, Jr.

Personal details
- Born: February 1, 1895 Orangeburg, South Carolina
- Died: January 1, 1962 (aged 66) Surfside, South Carolina
- Resting place: Sumter, South Carolina
- Party: Democratic
- Education: Wofford College
- Profession: Teacher, businessman, politician

John Jacob Riley (February 1, 1895 – January 1, 1962) was a U.S. representative from South Carolina, husband of Corinne Boyd Riley.

== Early life ==
Born on a farm near Orangeburg, South Carolina, Riley attended the public schools in Orangeburg County. His grandfather, Onan Beverly Riley (1844-1945), was a Confederate veteran. He graduated from Wofford College in Spartanburg, South Carolina, in 1915. Riley taught in the Orangeburg city schools 1915–1917, and at Clemson Agricultural and Mechanical College in 1917 and 1918.

During the First World War served in the United States Navy as a seaman, second class, and as a yeoman, third class, from 1918 to 1919. After the war, he engaged in the real estate and insurance business in Sumter, South Carolina from 1919 to 1945, and served as secretary of a building and loan association from 1923 to 1945.

== Political career ==
Riley served as delegate to the Democratic State conventions from 1928 to 1944. He was elected as a Democrat to the Seventy-ninth and Eightieth Congresses (January 3, 1945 – January 3, 1949). He was an unsuccessful candidate for renomination in 1948, but won the nomination again in 1950.

Riley was elected to the Eighty-second and to the five succeeding Congresses and served from January 3, 1951, until his death at Surfside, near Myrtle Beach, South Carolina, January 1, 1962. Riley Park was named after him. He was interred in Sumter Cemetery, Sumter, South Carolina.

He was a signatory to the 1956 Southern Manifesto that opposed the desegregation of public schools ordered by the Supreme Court in Brown v. Board of Education.

== See also ==
- List of members of the United States Congress who died in office (1950–1999)

== Sources ==
- United States Congress. "John J. Riley (id: R000260)". Biographical Directory of the United States Congress.

U.S. House of Representatives
Preceded by Willa L. Fulmer	Member of the U.S. House of Representatives from South Carolina's 2nd congressional district 1945–1949	Succeeded by Hugo S. Sims, Jr.
Preceded by Hugo S. Sims, Jr.	Member of the U.S. House of Representatives from South Carolina's 2nd congressional district 1951–1962	Succeeded by Corinne Boyd Riley
