= 1968 United States House of Representatives elections in South Carolina =

- November 5, 1968

All 6 South Carolina seats to the United States House of Representatives
	Majority party	Minority party
Party	Democratic	Republican
Last election	5	1
Seats won	5	1
Seat change	Steady	Steady
Popular vote	416,181	203,902
Percentage	66.29%	32.48%
Swing	▼4.31%	▲3.17%

Democratic
50–60%
60–70%
70–80%
80–90%
90–100%
Republican
50–60%
70–80%

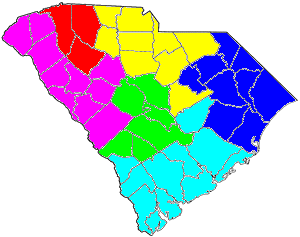
South Carolina congressional districts, 1962 to 1970 1st district 2nd district 3rd district 4th district 5th district 6th district

The 1968 United States House of Representatives elections in South Carolina were held on November 5, 1968, to select six Representatives for two-year terms from the state of South Carolina. The primary elections were held on June 11 and the runoff elections were held two weeks later on June 25. All five incumbents who ran were re-elected and the open seat in the 5th district was retained by the Democrats. The composition of the state delegation remained five Democrats and one Republican.

== 1st congressional district ==
Incumbent Democratic Congressman L. Mendel Rivers of the 1st congressional district, in office since 1941, defeated black attorney George A. Payton, Jr. in the Democratic primary and was unopposed in the general election. Charleston County Republican Party chairman James B. Edwards was prepared to run in the general election had George A. Payton, Jr. won the Democratic primary.

=== Democratic primary ===
Democratic primary
Candidate	Votes	%
L. Mendel Rivers	65,817	77.7
George A. Payton, Jr.	18,933	22.3

=== General election results ===
South Carolina's 1st congressional district election results, 1968
Party	Candidate	Votes	%	±%
Democratic	L. Mendel Rivers (incumbent)	95,478	100.0	0.0
Majority		95,478	100.0	0.0
Turnout		95,478		
Democratic hold				

== 2nd congressional district ==
Incumbent Republican Congressman Albert Watson of the 2nd congressional district, in office since 1963, defeated Democratic challenger Frank K. Sloan.

=== General election results ===
South Carolina's 2nd congressional district election results, 1968
Party	Candidate	Votes	%	±%
Republican	Albert Watson (incumbent)	63,877	57.6	−6.7
Democratic	Frank K. Sloan	47,053	42.4	+6.7
No party	Write-Ins	5	0.0	0.0
Majority		16,824	15.2	−13.4
Turnout		110,935		
Republican hold				

== 3rd congressional district ==
Incumbent Democratic Congressman William Jennings Bryan Dorn of the 3rd congressional district, in office since 1951, defeated Republican challenger John Grisso.

=== General election results ===
South Carolina's 3rd congressional district election results, 1968
Party	Candidate	Votes	%	±%
Democratic	William J.B. Dorn (incumbent)	74,104	66.1	+8.3
Republican	John K. Grisso	35,463	31.7	−10.5
Independent	J. Harold Morton	2,489	2.2	+2.2
No party	Write-Ins	1	0.0	0.0
Majority		38,641	34.4	+18.8
Turnout		112,057		
Democratic hold				

== 4th congressional district ==
Incumbent Democratic Congressman Robert T. Ashmore of the 4th congressional district, in office since 1953, opted to retire. James R. Mann won the Democratic primary and defeated Republican challenger Charles Bradshaw in the general election.

=== Democratic primary ===
Democratic primary
Candidate	Votes	%
James R. Mann	17,035	31.7
E.C. Burnett, Jr.	15,089	28.1
Nick A. Theodore	14,361	26.7
Leo Hill	7,218	13.4

Democratic primary runoff
Candidate	Votes	%	±%
James R. Mann	23,923	56.9	+25.2
E.C. Burnett, Jr.	18,107	43.1	+15.0

=== General election results ===
South Carolina's 4th congressional district election results, 1968
Party	Candidate	Votes	%	±%
Democratic	James R. Mann	68,437	61.2	−38.8
Republican	Charles Bradshaw	43,440	38.8	+38.8
Majority		24,997	22.4	−77.6
Turnout		111,877		
Democratic hold				

== 5th congressional district ==
Incumbent Democratic Congressman Thomas S. Gettys of the 5th congressional district, in office since 1964, defeated Fred R. Sheheen in the Democratic primary and Republican Hugh J. Boyd in the general election.

=== Democratic primary ===
Democratic primary
Candidate	Votes	%
Thomas S. Gettys	53,448	72.9
Fred R. Sheheen	19,890	27.1

=== General election results ===
South Carolina's 5th congressional district election results, 1968
Party	Candidate	Votes	%	±%
Democratic	Thomas S. Gettys (incumbent)	72,805	74.7	−24.5
Republican	Hugh J. Boyd	21,246	21.8	+21.8
Independent	Bert Sumner	3,411	3.5	+3.5
Majority		51,559	52.9	−45.5
Turnout		97,462		
Democratic hold				

== 6th congressional district ==
Incumbent Democratic Congressman John L. McMillan of the 6th congressional district, in office since 1939, defeated Richard G. Dusenbury in the Democratic primary and Republican Ray Harris in the general election.

=== Democratic primary ===
Democratic primary
Candidate	Votes	%
John L. McMillan	47,611	65.9
Richard G. Dusenbury	24,679	34.1

=== General election results ===
South Carolina's 6th congressional district election results, 1968
Party	Candidate	Votes	%	±%
Democratic	John L. McMillan (incumbent)	58,304	58.3	−3.4
Republican	Ray Harris	39,876	39.9	+1.6
Independent	Claude E. Harris	1,849	1.8	+1.8
Majority		18,428	18.4	−5.0
Turnout		100,029		
Democratic hold				

== See also ==
- United States House elections, 1968
- United States Senate election in South Carolina, 1968
- South Carolina's congressional districts
