= 1956 United States House of Representatives elections in South Carolina =

- November 6, 1956

All 6 South Carolina seats to the United States House of Representatives
	Majority party
Party	Democratic
Last election	6
Seats won	6
Seat change	Steady
Popular vote	249,591
Percentage	95.26%
District results
Democratic
80–90%
90–100%

The 1956 United States House of Representatives elections in South Carolina were held on November 6, 1956, to select six Representatives for two-year terms from the state of South Carolina. All five incumbents who ran were re-elected and the open seat in the 5th congressional district was retained by the Democrats. The composition of the state delegation thus remained solely Democratic.

== 1st congressional district ==
Incumbent Democratic Congressman L. Mendel Rivers of the 1st congressional district, in office since 1941, was unopposed in his bid for re-election.

=== General election results ===
South Carolina's 1st congressional district election results, 1956
Party	Candidate	Votes	%	±%
Democratic	L. Mendel Rivers (incumbent)	31,112	100.0	+2.3
No party	Write-Ins	2	0.0	0.0
Majority		31,110	100.0	+4.6
Turnout		31,114		
Democratic hold				

== 2nd congressional district ==
Incumbent Democratic Congressman John J. Riley of the 2nd congressional district, in office since 1951, was unopposed in his bid for re-election.

=== General election results ===
South Carolina's 2nd congressional district election results, 1956
Party	Candidate	Votes	%	±%
Democratic	John J. Riley (incumbent)	49,284	100.0	+2.3
No party	Write-Ins	3	0.0	0.0
Majority		49,281	100.0	+4.6
Turnout		49,287		
Democratic hold				

== 3rd congressional district ==
Incumbent Democratic Congressman William Jennings Bryan Dorn of the 3rd congressional district, in office since 1951, defeated Republican challenger Maka Knox.

=== General election results ===
South Carolina's 3rd congressional district election results, 1956
Party	Candidate	Votes	%	±%
Democratic	William J.B. Dorn (incumbent)	39,270	92.9	−6.4
Republican	Maka Knox	2,885	6.8	+6.2
No party	Write-Ins	127	0.3	+0.2
Majority		36,385	86.1	−12.6
Turnout		42,282		
Democratic hold				

== 4th congressional district ==
Incumbent Democratic Congressman Robert T. Ashmore of the 4th congressional district, in office since 1953, defeated Republican challenger Dan H. Wallace, Jr.

=== General election results ===
South Carolina's 4th congressional district election results, 1956
Party	Candidate	Votes	%	±%
Democratic	Robert T. Ashmore (incumbent)	53,722	85.1	−14.1
Republican	Dan H. Wallace, Jr.	9,393	14.9	+14.1
Majority		44,329	70.2	−28.2
Turnout		63,115		
Democratic hold				

== 5th congressional district ==
Incumbent Democratic Congressman James P. Richards of the 5th congressional district, in office since 1933, opted to retire. Robert W. Hemphill defeated Thomas S. Gettys in the Democratic primary and was unopposed in the general election.

=== Democratic primary ===
Democratic primary
Candidate	Votes	%
Robert W. Hemphill	28,424	59.0
Thomas S. Gettys	19,760	41.0

=== General election results ===
South Carolina's 5th congressional district election results, 1956
Party	Candidate	Votes	%	±%
Democratic	Robert W. Hemphill	36,454	100.0	0.0
Majority		36,454	100.0	0.0
Turnout		36,454		
Democratic hold				

== 6th congressional district ==
Incumbent Democratic Congressman John L. McMillan of the 6th congressional district, in office since 1939, was unopposed in his bid for re-election.

=== General election results ===
South Carolina's 6th congressional district election results, 1956
Party	Candidate	Votes	%	±%
Democratic	John L. McMillan (incumbent)	39,749	100.0	+1.1
No party	Write-Ins	3	0.0	0.0
Majority		39,746	100.0	+2.2
Turnout		39,752		
Democratic hold				

== See also ==
- United States House of Representatives elections, 1956
- United States Senate election in South Carolina, 1956
- United States Senate special election in South Carolina, 1956
- South Carolina's congressional districts
