= 1946 United States House of Representatives elections in South Carolina =

- November 5, 1946

All 6 South Carolina seats to the United States House of Representatives
	Majority party
Party	Democratic
Last election	6
Seats won	6
Seat change	Steady
Popular vote	26,066
Percentage	98.89%
District results
Democratic
90–100%

The 1946 United States House of Representatives elections in South Carolina were held on November 5, 1946, to select six Representatives for two-year terms from the state of South Carolina. Five incumbents were re-elected, but Butler B. Hare of the 3rd congressional district was defeated in the Democratic primary by W. J. Bryan Dorn. The seat remained with the Democrats and the composition of the state delegation remained solely Democratic.

== 1st congressional district ==
Incumbent Democratic Congressman L. Mendel Rivers of the 1st congressional district, in office since 1941, was unopposed in his bid for re-election.

=== General election results ===
South Carolina's 1st congressional district election results, 1946
Party	Candidate	Votes	%	±%
Democratic	L. Mendel Rivers (incumbent)	5,354	99.5	+6.7
No party	Write-Ins	26	0.5	+0.5
Majority		5,328	99.0	+13.4
Turnout		5,380		
Democratic hold				

== 2nd congressional district ==
Incumbent Democratic Congressman John J. Riley of the 2nd congressional district, in office since 1945, was unopposed in his bid for re-election.

=== General election results ===
South Carolina's 2nd congressional district election results, 1946
Party	Candidate	Votes	%	±%
Democratic	John J. Riley (incumbent)	4,795	98.6	+0.6
No party	Write-Ins	67	1.4	+1.4
Majority		4,728	97.2	+1.2
Turnout		4,862		
Democratic hold				

== 3rd congressional district ==
Incumbent Democratic Congressman Butler B. Hare of the 3rd congressional district, in office since 1939, was defeated in the Democratic primary by W. J. Bryan Dorn who was unopposed in the general election.

=== Democratic primary ===
Democratic primary
Candidate	Votes	%
W. J. Bryan Dorn	31,164	61.6
Butler B. Hare	19,423	38.4

=== General election results ===
South Carolina's 3rd congressional district election results, 1946
Party	Candidate	Votes	%	±%
Democratic	W. J. Bryan Dorn	3,527	99.9	+2.9
No party	Write-Ins	3	0.1	+0.1
Majority		3,524	99.8	+5.8
Turnout		3,530		
Democratic hold				

== 4th congressional district ==
Incumbent Democratic Congressman Joseph R. Bryson of the 4th congressional district, in office since 1939, defeated Charles C. Moore in the Democratic primary and was unopposed in the general election.

=== Democratic primary ===
Democratic primary
Candidate	Votes	%
Joseph R. Bryson	28,232	58.3
Charles C. Moore	20,208	41.7

=== General election results ===
South Carolina's 4th congressional district election results, 1946
Party	Candidate	Votes	%	±%
Democratic	Joseph R. Bryson (incumbent)	3,363	99.6	+3.9
No party	Write-Ins	13	0.4	+0.4
Majority		3,350	99.2	+7.8
Turnout		3,376		
Democratic hold				

== 5th congressional district ==
Incumbent Democratic Congressman James P. Richards of the 5th congressional district, in office since 1933, was unopposed in his bid for re-election.

=== General election results ===
South Carolina's 5th congressional district election results, 1946
Party	Candidate	Votes	%	±%
Democratic	James P. Richards (incumbent)	3,357	100.0	+1.9
Majority		3,357	100.0	+3.8
Turnout		3,357		
Democratic hold				

== 6th congressional district ==
Incumbent Democratic Congressman John L. McMillan of the 6th congressional district, in office since 1939, won the Democratic primary and defeated Progressive Party candidate James E. Prioleau in the general election.

=== Democratic primary ===
Democratic primary
Candidate	Votes	%
John L. McMillan	35,494	68.4
G. Stanley Bryant	14,307	27.5
Wendell J. Holbert	2,117	4.1

=== General election results ===
South Carolina's 6th congressional district election results, 1946
Party	Candidate	Votes	%	±%
Democratic	John L. McMillan (incumbent)	5,670	96.9	−1.1
Progressive Democratic	James E. Prioleau	141	2.4	+2.4
Independent	Leroy Dimery	41	0.7	+0.7
Majority		5,529	94.5	−1.5
Turnout		5,852		
Democratic hold				

== See also ==
- 1946 United States House of Representatives elections
- 1946 South Carolina gubernatorial election
- South Carolina's congressional districts
