= 1954 United States House of Representatives elections in South Carolina =

- November 2, 1954

All 6 South Carolina seats to the United States House of Representatives
	Majority party
Party	Democratic
Last election	6
Seats won	6
Seat change	Steady
Popular vote	210,624
Percentage	98.73%
District results
Democratic
90–100%

The 1954 United States House of Representatives elections in South Carolina were held on November 2, 1954, to select six Representatives for two-year terms from the state of South Carolina. The primary elections were held on July 13. All six incumbents were re-elected and the composition of the state delegation remained solely Democratic.

== 1st congressional district ==
Incumbent Democratic Congressman L. Mendel Rivers of the 1st congressional district, in office since 1941, defeated Republican challenger Mrs. John E. Messervy.

=== General election results ===
South Carolina's 1st congressional district election results, 1954
Party	Candidate	Votes	%	±%
Democratic	L. Mendel Rivers (incumbent)	33,402	97.7	−2.3
Republican	Mrs. John E. Messervy	769	2.3	+2.3
No party	Write-Ins	1	0.0	0.0
Majority		32,633	95.4	−4.6
Turnout		34,172		
Democratic hold				

== 2nd congressional district ==
Incumbent Democratic Congressman John J. Riley of the 2nd congressional district, in office since 1951, defeated Republican challenger I.S. Leevy.

=== General election results ===
South Carolina's 2nd congressional district election results, 1954
Party	Candidate	Votes	%	±%
Democratic	John J. Riley (incumbent)	44,484	97.7	−2.3
Republican	I.S. Leevy	1,054	2.3	+2.3
No party	Write-Ins	1	0.0	0.0
Majority		43,430	95.4	−4.6
Turnout		45,539		
Democratic hold				

== 3rd congressional district ==
Incumbent Democratic Congressman William Jennings Bryan Dorn of the 3rd congressional district, in office since 1951, defeated Republican challenger C.M. Smith.

=== General election results ===
South Carolina's 3rd congressional district election results, 1954
Party	Candidate	Votes	%	±%
Democratic	William J.B. Dorn (incumbent)	30,790	99.3	+5.5
Republican	C.M. Smith	199	0.6	−5.4
No party	Write-Ins	24	0.1	−0.1
Majority		30,591	98.7	
Turnout		31,013		
Democratic hold				

== 4th congressional district ==
Incumbent Democratic Congressman Robert T. Ashmore of the 4th congressional district, in office since 1953, defeated Republican challenger Lena Bellotte.

=== Democratic primary ===
Democratic primary
Candidate	Votes	%
Robert T. Ashmore	30,182	62.4
Charles C. Moore	18,222	37.6

=== General election results ===
South Carolina's 4th congressional district election results, 1954
Party	Candidate	Votes	%	±%
Democratic	Robert T. Ashmore (incumbent)	43,857	99.2	−0.8
Republican	Lena Bellotte	342	0.8	+0.8
Majority		43,515	98.4	−1.6
Turnout		44,199		
Democratic hold				

== 5th congressional district ==
Incumbent Democratic Congressman James P. Richards of the 5th congressional district, in office since 1933, defeated Wade S. Weatherford in the Democratic primary and was unopposed in the general election.

=== Democratic primary ===
Democratic primary
Candidate	Votes	%
James P. Richards	35,019	65.4
Wade S. Weatherford	18,537	34.6

=== General election results ===
South Carolina's 5th congressional district election results, 1954
Party	Candidate	Votes	%	±%
Democratic	James P. Richards (incumbent)	26,950	100.0	+6.1
No party	Write-Ins	1	0.0	0.0
Majority		26,949	100.0	+12.2
Turnout		26,951		
Democratic hold				

== 6th congressional district ==
Incumbent Democratic Congressman John L. McMillan of the 6th congressional district, in office since 1939, defeated Republican challenger Vernon Johnson.

=== General election results ===
South Carolina's 6th congressional district election results, 1954
Party	Candidate	Votes	%	±%
Democratic	John L. McMillan (incumbent)	31,141	98.9	−1.1
Republican	Vernon Johnson	347	1.1	+1.1
No party	Write-Ins	4	0.0	0.0
Majority		30,794	97.8	−2.2
Turnout		31,492		
Democratic hold				

== See also ==
- United States House of Representatives elections, 1954
- United States Senate election in South Carolina, 1954
- South Carolina gubernatorial election, 1954
- South Carolina's congressional districts
