= 1964 United States House of Representatives elections in South Carolina =

- November 3, 1964

All 6 South Carolina seats to the United States House of Representatives
	Majority party	Minority party
Party	Democratic	Republican
Last election	6	0
Seats won	6	0
Seat change	Steady	Steady
Popular vote	386,738	48,970
Percentage	88.26%	11.18%
Swing	▲2.28%	▼2.84%
District results
Democratic
60–70%
90–100%

The 1964 United States House of Representatives elections in South Carolina were held on November 3, 1964, to select six Representatives for two-year terms from the state of South Carolina. The primary elections were held on June 9 and the runoff elections were held two weeks later on June 23. All five incumbents who ran were re-elected and the open seat in the 5th congressional district was retained by the Democrats. The composition of the state delegation thus remained solely Democratic.

== 1st congressional district ==
Incumbent Democratic Congressman L. Mendel Rivers of the 1st congressional district, in office since 1941, was unopposed in his bid for re-election.

=== General election results ===
South Carolina's 1st congressional district election results, 1964
Party	Candidate	Votes	%	±%
Democratic	L. Mendel Rivers (incumbent)	56,152	99.6	−0.4
No party	Write-Ins	244	0.4	+0.4
Majority		55,908	99.2	−0.8
Turnout		56,396		
Democratic hold				

== 2nd congressional district ==
Incumbent Democratic Congressman Albert Watson of the 2nd congressional district in office since 1963, was unopposed in his bid for re-election.

=== General election results ===
South Carolina's 2nd congressional district election results, 1964
Party	Candidate	Votes	%	±%
Democratic	Albert Watson	88,682	97.6	+44.8
No party	Write-Ins	2,209	2.4	+2.4
Majority		86,473	95.2	+89.6
Turnout		90,891		
Democratic hold				

== 3rd congressional district ==
Incumbent Democratic Congressman William Jennings Bryan Dorn of the 3rd congressional district, in office since 1951, won the Democratic primary and was unopposed in his bid for re-election.

=== Democratic primary ===
Democratic primary
Candidate	Votes	%
William J.B. Dorn (incumbent)	39,934	70.6
T. M. Tucker	16,658	29.4

=== General election results ===
South Carolina's 3rd congressional district election results, 1964
Party	Candidate	Votes	%	±%
Democratic	William J.B. Dorn (incumbent)	65,920	99.9	−0.1
No party	Write-Ins	47	0.1	+0.1
Majority		65,873	99.8	−0.2
Turnout		65,967		
Democratic hold				

== 4th congressional district ==
Incumbent Democratic Congressman Robert T. Ashmore of the 4th congressional district, in office since 1953, won the Democratic primary and was unopposed in the general election.

=== Democratic primary ===
Democratic primary
Candidate	Votes	%
Robert T. Ashmore	42,068	84.2
Gordon Weathers	7,910	15.8

=== General election results ===
South Carolina's 4th congressional district election results, 1964
Party	Candidate	Votes	%	±%
Democratic	Robert T. Ashmore (incumbent)	81,727	100.0	0.0
Majority		81,727	100.0	0.0
Turnout		81,727		
Democratic hold				

== 5th congressional district ==
Incumbent Democratic Congressman Robert W. Hemphill of the 5th congressional district, in office since 1957, opted to retire. Thomas S. Gettys won the Democratic primary and defeated Republican challenger Robert M. Doster in the general election.

=== Democratic primary ===
Democratic primary
Candidate	Votes	%
Thomas S. Gettys	19,092	39.4
George F. Coleman	18,048	37.2
J. Bates Harvey	8,913	18.4
Harold Hough	2,417	5.0

Democratic primary runoff
Candidate	Votes	%	±%
Thomas S. Gettys	16,861	52.2	+12.8
George F. Coleman	15,415	47.8	+10.6

=== General election results ===
South Carolina's 5th congressional district election results, 1964
Party	Candidate	Votes	%	±%
Democratic	Thomas S. Gettys	44,859	66.7	−27.2
Republican	Robert M. Doster	22,384	33.3	+27.3
Majority		22,475	33.4	−54.5
Turnout		67,243		
Democratic hold				

== 6th congressional district ==
Incumbent Democratic Congressman John L. McMillan of the 6th congressional district, in office since 1939, defeated Republican challenger E. R. Kirkland.

=== General election results ===
South Carolina's 6th congressional district election results, 1964
Party	Candidate	Votes	%	±%
Democratic	John L. McMillan (incumbent)	49,398	65.1	−34.9
Republican	E. R. Kirkland	26,586	34.9	+34.9
No party	Write-Ins	1	0.0	0.0
Majority		22,812	30.2	−69.8
Turnout		75,985		
Democratic hold				

== See also ==
- United States House elections, 1964
- South Carolina's congressional districts

== Sources ==
- Scammon, Richard. America Votes, Vol. 6. p. 378.
- Info
