= 1952 United States House of Representatives elections in South Carolina =

- November 4, 1952

All 6 South Carolina seats to the United States House of Representatives
	Majority party
Party	Democratic
Last election	6
Seats won	6
Seat change	Steady
Popular vote	278,180
Percentage	98.00%
District results
Democratic
90–100%

The 1952 United States House of Representatives elections in South Carolina were held on November 4, 1952, to select six Representatives for two-year terms from the state of South Carolina. All six incumbents were re-elected and the composition of the state delegation remained solely Democratic.

== 1st congressional district ==
Incumbent Democratic Congressman L. Mendel Rivers of the 1st congressional district, in office since 1941, was unopposed in his bid for re-election.

=== General election results ===
South Carolina's 1st congressional district election results, 1952
Party	Candidate	Votes	%	±%
Democratic	L. Mendel Rivers (incumbent)	30,483	100.0	0.0
No party	Write-Ins	13	0.0	0.0
Majority		30,470	100.0	0.0
Turnout		30,496		
Democratic hold				

== 2nd congressional district ==
Incumbent Democratic Congressman John J. Riley of the 2nd congressional district, in office since 1951, was unopposed in his bid for re-election.

=== General election results ===
South Carolina's 2nd congressional district election results, 1952
Party	Candidate	Votes	%	±%
Democratic	John J. Riley (incumbent)	42,201	100.0	0.0
No party	Write-Ins	8	0.0	0.0
Majority		42,193	100.0	0.0
Turnout		42,209		
Democratic hold				

== 3rd congressional district ==
Incumbent Democratic Congressman W.J. Bryan Dorn of the 3rd congressional district, in office since 1951, defeated Republican challenger David Dows.

=== General election results ===
South Carolina's 3rd congressional district election results, 1952
Party	Candidate	Votes	%	±%
Democratic	W.J. Bryan Dorn (incumbent)	44,237	93.8	−6.2
Republican	David Dows	2,849	6.0	+6.0
No party	Write-Ins	72	0.2	+0.2
Majority		41,388	87.8	−12.2
Turnout		47,158		
Democratic hold				

== 4th congressional district ==
Incumbent Democratic Congressman Joseph R. Bryson of the 4th congressional district, in office since 1939, was unopposed in his bid for re-election.

=== General election results ===
South Carolina's 4th congressional district election results, 1952
Party	Candidate	Votes	%	±%
Democratic	Joseph R. Bryson (incumbent)	77,850	100.0	+0.1
Majority		77,850	100.0	+0.2
Turnout		77,850		
Democratic hold				

== 5th congressional district ==
Incumbent Democratic Congressman James P. Richards of the 5th congressional district, in office since 1933, defeated Wade S. Weatherford in the Democratic primary and Republican Herbert L. Crosland in the general election.

=== Democratic primary ===
Democratic primary
Candidate	Votes	%
James P. Richards	27,253	60.7
Wade S. Weatherford	17,681	39.3

=== General election results ===
South Carolina's 5th congressional district election results, 1952
Party	Candidate	Votes	%	±%
Democratic	James P. Richards (incumbent)	42,081	93.9	−6.1
Republican	Herbert L. Crosland	2,722	6.1	+6.1
Majority		39,359	87.8	−12.2
Turnout		44,803		
Democratic hold				

== 6th congressional district ==
Incumbent Democratic Congressman John L. McMillan of the 6th congressional district, in office since 1939, was unopposed in his bid for re-election.

=== General election results ===
South Carolina's 6th congressional district election results, 1952
Party	Candidate	Votes	%	±%
Democratic	John L. McMillan (incumbent)	41,328	100.0	0.0
No party	Write-Ins	8	0.0	0.0
Majority		41,320	100.0	0.0
Turnout		41,336		
Democratic hold				

== See also ==
- United States House of Representatives elections, 1952
- South Carolina's congressional districts
