= 1966 United States House of Representatives elections in South Carolina =

- November 8, 1966

All 6 South Carolina seats to the United States House of Representatives
| | Majority party | Minority party |
|---|---|---|
| Party | Democratic | Republican |
| Last election | 6 | 0 |
| Seats before | 5 | 1 |
| Seats won | 5 | 1 |
| Seat change | Steady | Steady |
| Popular vote | 257,193 | 106,775 |
| Percentage | 70.60% | 29.31% |
| Swing | ▼17.66% | ▲18.13% |
District results
Democratic
50–60%
60–70%
90–100%
Republican
60–70%

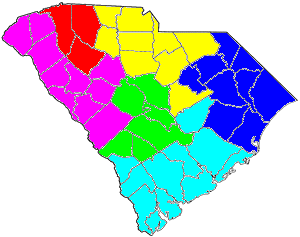
South Carolina congressional districts, 1962 to 1970 1st district 2nd district 3rd district 4th district 5th district 6th district

The 1966 United States House of Representatives elections in South Carolina were held on November 8, 1966, to select six Representatives for two-year terms from the state of South Carolina. All six incumbents were re-elected and the composition of the state delegation remained five Democrats and one Republican.

== 1st congressional district ==
Incumbent Democratic Congressman L. Mendel Rivers of the 1st congressional district, in office since 1941, was unopposed in his bid for re-election.

=== General election results ===
South Carolina's 1st congressional district election results, 1966
| Party | Candidate | Votes | % | ±% |
|---|---|---|---|---|
| Democratic | L. Mendel Rivers (incumbent) | 59,055 | 100.0 | +0.4 |
| Majority | | 59,055 | 100.0 | +0.8 |
| Turnout | | 59,055 | | |
| Democratic hold | | | | |

== 2nd congressional district ==
Incumbent Republican Congressman Albert Watson of the 2nd congressional district, in office since 1963, defeated Democratic challenger Fred LeClercq.

=== General election results ===
South Carolina's 2nd congressional district election results, 1966
| Party | Candidate | Votes | % | ±% |
|---|---|---|---|---|
| Republican | Albert Watson (incumbent) | 48,742 | 64.3 | +64.3 |
| Democratic | Fred LeClercq | 27,013 | 35.7 | −61.9 |
| Majority | | 21,729 | 28.6 | −66.6 |
| Turnout | | 75,755 | | |
| Republican hold | | | | |

== 3rd congressional district ==
Incumbent Democratic Congressman William Jennings Bryan Dorn of the 3rd congressional district, in office since 1951, defeated Republican challenger John Grisso.

=== General election results ===
South Carolina's 3rd congressional district election results, 1966
| Party | Candidate | Votes | % | ±% |
|---|---|---|---|---|
| Democratic | William J.B. Dorn (incumbent) | 42,874 | 57.8 | −42.1 |
| Republican | John Grisso | 31,331 | 42.2 | +42.2 |
| Majority | | 11,543 | 15.6 | −84.2 |
| Turnout | | 74,205 | | |
| Democratic hold | | | | |

== 4th congressional district ==
Incumbent Democratic Congressman Robert T. Ashmore of the 4th congressional district, in office since 1953, was unopposed in his bid for re-election.

=== General election results ===
South Carolina's 4th congressional district election results, 1966
| Party | Candidate | Votes | % | ±% |
|---|---|---|---|---|
| Democratic | Robert T. Ashmore (incumbent) | 43,611 | 100.0 | 0.0 |
| Majority | | 43,611 | 100.0 | 0.0 |
| Turnout | | 43,611 | | |
| Democratic hold | | | | |

== 5th congressional district ==
Incumbent Democratic Congressman Thomas S. Gettys of the 5th congressional district, in office since 1964, was unopposed in his bid for re-election.

=== General election results ===
South Carolina's 5th congressional district election results, 1966
| Party | Candidate | Votes | % | ±% |
|---|---|---|---|---|
| Democratic | Thomas S. Gettys (incumbent) | 41,550 | 99.2 | +32.1 |
| No party | Write-Ins | 345 | 0.8 | +0.8 |
| Majority | | 41,205 | 98.4 | +64.2 |
| Turnout | | 41,895 | | |
| Democratic hold | | | | |

== 6th congressional district ==
Incumbent Democratic Congressman John L. McMillan of the 6th congressional district, in office since 1939, defeated Republican challenger Archie C. Odom.

=== General election results ===
South Carolina's 6th congressional district election results, 1966
| Party | Candidate | Votes | % | ±% |
|---|---|---|---|---|
| Democratic | John L. McMillan (incumbent) | 43,090 | 61.7 | −3.3 |
| Republican | Archie C. Odom | 26,702 | 38.3 | +3.3 |
| Majority | | 16,388 | 23.4 | −6.6 |
| Turnout | | 69,792 | | |
| Democratic hold | | | | |

== See also ==
- United States House elections, 1966
- United States Senate election in South Carolina, 1966
- United States Senate special election in South Carolina, 1966
- South Carolina gubernatorial election, 1966
- South Carolina's congressional districts
