= 1940 United States House of Representatives elections in South Carolina =

The 1940 United States House of Representatives elections in South Carolina were held on November 5, 1940, to select six Representatives for two-year terms from the state of South Carolina. All five incumbents who ran were re-elected and the open seat in the 1st congressional district was retained by the Democrats. The composition of the state delegation thus remained solely Democratic.

== 1st congressional district ==
Incumbent Democratic Congresswoman Clara G. McMillan of the 1st congressional district succeeded her husband, Thomas S. McMillan, in office upon his death in 1939. She did not seek re-election and L. Mendel Rivers defeated Alfred von Kolnitz in the Democratic primary and Republican Mrs. John E. Messervy in the general election.

=== Democratic primary ===
Democratic primary
Candidate	Votes	%
L. Mendel Rivers	18,253	54.2
Alfred von Kolnitz	15,413	45.8

=== General election results ===
South Carolina's 1st congressional district election results, 1940
Party	Candidate	Votes	%	±%
Democratic	L. Mendel Rivers	16,626	98.3	+0.1
Republican	Mrs. John E. Messervy	278	1.6	−0.2
No party	Write-Ins	14	0.1	+0.1
Majority		16,348	96.7	+0.3
Turnout		16,918		
Democratic hold				

== 2nd congressional district ==
Incumbent Democratic Congressman Hampton P. Fulmer of the 2nd congressional district, in office since 1921, defeated former Lieutenant Governor Andrew J. Bethea in the Democratic primary and Republican M.B. Cross in the general election.

=== Democratic primary ===
Democratic primary
Candidate	Votes	%
Hampton P. Fulmer	39,945	76.8
Andrew J. Bethea	12,078	23.2

=== General election results ===
South Carolina's 2nd congressional district election results, 1940
Party	Candidate	Votes	%	±%
Democratic	Hampton P. Fulmer (incumbent)	14,920	98.6	−0.2
Republican	M.B. Cross	206	1.4	+1.1
Majority		14,714	97.2	−1.3
Turnout		15,126		
Democratic hold				

== 3rd congressional district ==
Incumbent Democratic Congressman Butler B. Hare of the 3rd congressional district, in office since 1939, defeated former Representative John C. Taylor in the Democratic primary and Republican A.F. Ernest in the general election.

=== Democratic primary ===
Democratic primary
Candidate	Votes	%
Butler B. Hare	44,713	67.2
John C. Taylor	21,787	32.8

=== General election results ===
South Carolina's 3rd congressional district election results, 1940
Party	Candidate	Votes	%	±%
Democratic	Butler B. Hare (incumbent)	15,977	99.3	−0.3
Republican	A.F. Ernest	108	0.7	+0.3
Majority		15,869	98.6	−0.6
Turnout		16,085		
Democratic hold				

== 4th congressional district ==
Incumbent Democratic Congressman Joseph R. Bryson of the 4th congressional district, in office since 1939, defeated Virgil Evans in the Democratic primary and Republican J.D. McCullough in the general election.

=== Democratic primary ===
Democratic primary
Candidate	Votes	%
Joseph R. Bryson	65,812	85.7
Virgil Evans	10,971	14.3

=== General election results ===
South Carolina's 4th congressional district election results, 1940
Party	Candidate	Votes	%	±%
Democratic	Joseph R. Bryson (incumbent)	23,825	97.3	−2.1
Republican	J.D. McCullough	657	2.7	+2.1
Majority		23,168	94.6	−4.2
Turnout		24,482		
Democratic hold				

== 5th congressional district ==
Incumbent Democratic Congressman James P. Richards of the 5th congressional district, in office since 1933, defeated Roy C. Cobb in the Democratic primary and Republican C.F. Pendleton in the general election.

=== Democratic primary ===
Democratic primary
Candidate	Votes	%
James P. Richards	33,262	72.3
Roy C. Cobb	12,748	27.7

=== General election results ===
South Carolina's 5th congressional district election results, 1940
Party	Candidate	Votes	%	±%
Democratic	James P. Richards (incumbent)	14,754	99.2	−0.6
Republican	C.F. Pendleton	120	0.8	+0.6
No party	Write-Ins	4	0.0	0.0
Majority		14,634	98.4	−1.2
Turnout		14,878		
Democratic hold				

== 6th congressional district ==
Incumbent Democratic Congressman John L. McMillan of the 6th congressional district, in office since 1939, defeated James P. "Spot" Mozingo in the Democratic primary and Republican C.B. Ruffin in the general election.

=== Democratic primary ===
Democratic primary
Candidate	Votes	%
John L. McMillan	34,969	65.3
James P. "Spot" Mozingo	18,576	34.7

=== General election results ===
South Carolina's 6th congressional district election results, 1940
Party	Candidate	Votes	%	±%
Democratic	John L. McMillan (incumbent)	12,074	99.0	−0.2
Republican	C.B. Ruffin	123	1.0	+0.2
Majority		11,951	98.0	−0.4
Turnout		12,197		
Democratic hold				

== See also ==
- United States House of Representatives elections, 1940
- South Carolina's congressional districts
