= 1960 United States House of Representatives elections in South Carolina =

- November 8, 1960

All 6 South Carolina seats to the United States House of Representatives
| | Majority party |
|---|---|
| Party | Democratic |
| Last election | 6 |
| Seats won | 6 |
| Seat change | Steady |
| Popular vote | 328,438 |
| Percentage | 99.97% |
District results
Democratic
90–100%

The 1960 United States House of Representatives elections in South Carolina were held on November 8, 1960, to select six Representatives for two-year terms from the state of South Carolina. All six incumbents were re-elected without opposition and the composition of the state delegation remained solely Democratic.

== 1st congressional district ==
Incumbent Democratic Congressman L. Mendel Rivers of the 1st congressional district, in office since 1941, was unopposed in his bid for re-election.

=== General election results ===
South Carolina's 1st congressional district election results, 1960
| Party | Candidate | Votes | % | ±% |
|---|---|---|---|---|
| Democratic | L. Mendel Rivers (incumbent) | 47,153 | 100.0 | 0.0 |
| No party | Write-Ins | 11 | 0.0 | 0.0 |
| Majority | | 41,142 | 100.0 | 0.0 |
| Turnout | | 47,164 | | |
| Democratic hold | | | | |

== 2nd congressional district ==
Incumbent Democratic Congressman John J. Riley of the 2nd congressional district, in office since 1951, was unopposed in his bid for re-election.

=== General election results ===
South Carolina's 2nd congressional district election results, 1960
| Party | Candidate | Votes | % | ±% |
|---|---|---|---|---|
| Democratic | John J. Riley (incumbent) | 63,207 | 100.0 | 0.0 |
| No party | Write-Ins | 5 | 0.0 | 0.0 |
| Majority | | 63,202 | 100.0 | 0.0 |
| Turnout | | 63,212 | | |
| Democratic hold | | | | |

== 3rd congressional district ==
Incumbent Democratic Congressman William Jennings Bryan Dorn of the 3rd congressional district, in office since 1951, was unopposed in his bid for re-election.

=== General election results ===
South Carolina's 3rd congressional district election results, 1960
| Party | Candidate | Votes | % | ±% |
|---|---|---|---|---|
| Democratic | William J.B. Dorn (incumbent) | 52,398 | 100.0 | 0.0 |
| No party | Write-Ins | 11 | 0.0 | 0.0 |
| Majority | | 52,387 | 100.0 | 0.0 |
| Turnout | | 52,409 | | |
| Democratic hold | | | | |

== 4th congressional district ==
Incumbent Democratic Congressman Robert T. Ashmore of the 4th congressional district, in office since 1953, was unopposed in his bid for re-election.

=== General election results ===
South Carolina's 4th congressional district election results, 1960
| Party | Candidate | Votes | % | ±% |
|---|---|---|---|---|
| Democratic | Robert T. Ashmore (incumbent) | 68,973 | 100.0 | 0.0 |
| Majority | | 68,973 | 100.0 | 0.0 |
| Turnout | | 68,973 | | |
| Democratic hold | | | | |

== 5th congressional district ==
Incumbent Democratic Congressman Robert W. Hemphill of the 5th congressional district, in office since 1957, was unopposed in his bid for re-election.

=== General election results ===
South Carolina's 5th congressional district election results, 1960
| Party | Candidate | Votes | % | ±% |
|---|---|---|---|---|
| Democratic | Robert W. Hemphill (incumbent) | 46,815 | 100.0 | 0.0 |
| No party | Write-Ins | 80 | 0.0 | 0.0 |
| Majority | | 46,735 | 100.0 | 0.0 |
| Turnout | | 46,895 | | |
| Democratic hold | | | | |

== 6th congressional district ==
Incumbent Democratic Congressman John L. McMillan of the 6th congressional district, in office since 1939, was unopposed in his bid for re-election.

=== General election results ===
South Carolina's 6th congressional district election results, 1960
| Party | Candidate | Votes | % | ±% |
|---|---|---|---|---|
| Democratic | John L. McMillan (incumbent) | 49,780 | 100.0 | 0.0 |
| No party | Write-Ins | 5 | 0.0 | 0.0 |
| Majority | | 49,775 | 100.0 | 0.0 |
| Turnout | | 49,785 | | |
| Democratic hold | | | | |

== See also ==
- 1960 United States House of Representatives elections
- 1960 United States Senate election in South Carolina
- South Carolina's congressional districts
