= 1958 United States House of Representatives elections in South Carolina =

- November 4, 1958

All 6 South Carolina seats to the United States House of Representatives
	Majority party
Party	Democratic
Last election	6
Seats won	6
Seat change	Steady
Popular vote	76,632
Percentage	99.98%
District results
Democratic
90–100%

The 1958 United States House of Representatives elections in South Carolina were held on November 4, 1958, to select six Representatives for two-year terms from the state of South Carolina. The primary election in the 2nd congressional district was held on June 10. All six incumbents were re-elected and the composition of the state delegation remained solely Democratic.

== 1st congressional district ==
Incumbent Democratic Congressman L. Mendel Rivers of the 1st congressional district, in office since 1941, was unopposed in his bid for re-election.

=== General election results ===
South Carolina's 1st congressional district election results, 1958
Party	Candidate	Votes	%	±%
Democratic	L. Mendel Rivers (incumbent)	13,538	100.0	0.0
No party	Write-Ins	2	0.0	0.0
Majority		13,536	100.0	0.0
Turnout		13,540		
Democratic hold				

== 2nd congressional district ==
Incumbent Democratic Congressman John J. Riley of the 2nd congressional district, in office since 1951, defeated E.B. Linder in the Democratic primary and was unopposed in the general election.

=== Democratic primary ===
Democratic primary
Candidate	Votes	%
John J. Riley	53,268	76.5
E. B. Lindler	16,329	23.5

=== General election results ===
South Carolina's 2nd congressional district election results, 1958
Party	Candidate	Votes	%	±%
Democratic	John J. Riley (incumbent)	13,677	100.0	0.0
No party	Write-Ins	1	0.0	0.0
Majority		13,676	100.0	0.0
Turnout		13,678		
Democratic hold				

== 3rd congressional district ==
Incumbent Democratic Congressman William Jennings Bryan Dorn of the 3rd congressional district, in office since 1951, was unopposed in his bid for re-election.

=== General election results ===
South Carolina's 3rd congressional district election results, 1958
Party	Candidate	Votes	%	±%
Democratic	William J.B. Dorn (incumbent)	9,528	100.0	+7.1
No party	Write-Ins	12	0.0	−0.3
Majority		9,516	100.0	+13.9
Turnout		9,540		
Democratic hold				

== 4th congressional district ==
Incumbent Democratic Congressman Robert T. Ashmore of the 4th congressional district, in office since 1953, was unopposed in his bid for re-election.

=== General election results ===
South Carolina's 4th congressional district election results, 1958
Party	Candidate	Votes	%	±%
Democratic	Robert T. Ashmore (incumbent)	17,247	100.0	+14.9
Majority		17,247	100.0	+29.8
Turnout		17,247		
Democratic hold				

== 5th congressional district ==
Incumbent Democratic Congressman Robert W. Hemphill of the 5th congressional district, in office since 1957, was unopposed in his bid for re-election.

=== General election results ===
South Carolina's 5th congressional district election results, 1958
Party	Candidate	Votes	%	±%
Democratic	Robert W. Hemphill (incumbent)	9,780	100.0	0.0
Majority		9,780	100.0	0.0
Turnout		9,780		
Democratic hold				

== 6th congressional district ==
Incumbent Democratic Congressman John L. McMillan of the 6th congressional district, in office since 1939, was unopposed in his bid for re-election.

=== General election results ===
South Carolina's 6th congressional district election results, 1958
Party	Candidate	Votes	%	±%
Democratic	John L. McMillan (incumbent)	12,862	100.0	0.0
Majority		12,862	100.0	0.0
Turnout		12,862		
Democratic hold				

== See also ==
- 1958 United States House of Representatives elections
- 1958 South Carolina gubernatorial election
- South Carolina's congressional districts
