= William Jennings Bryan Dorn Veterans Affairs Medical Center =

- Veterans Health Administration
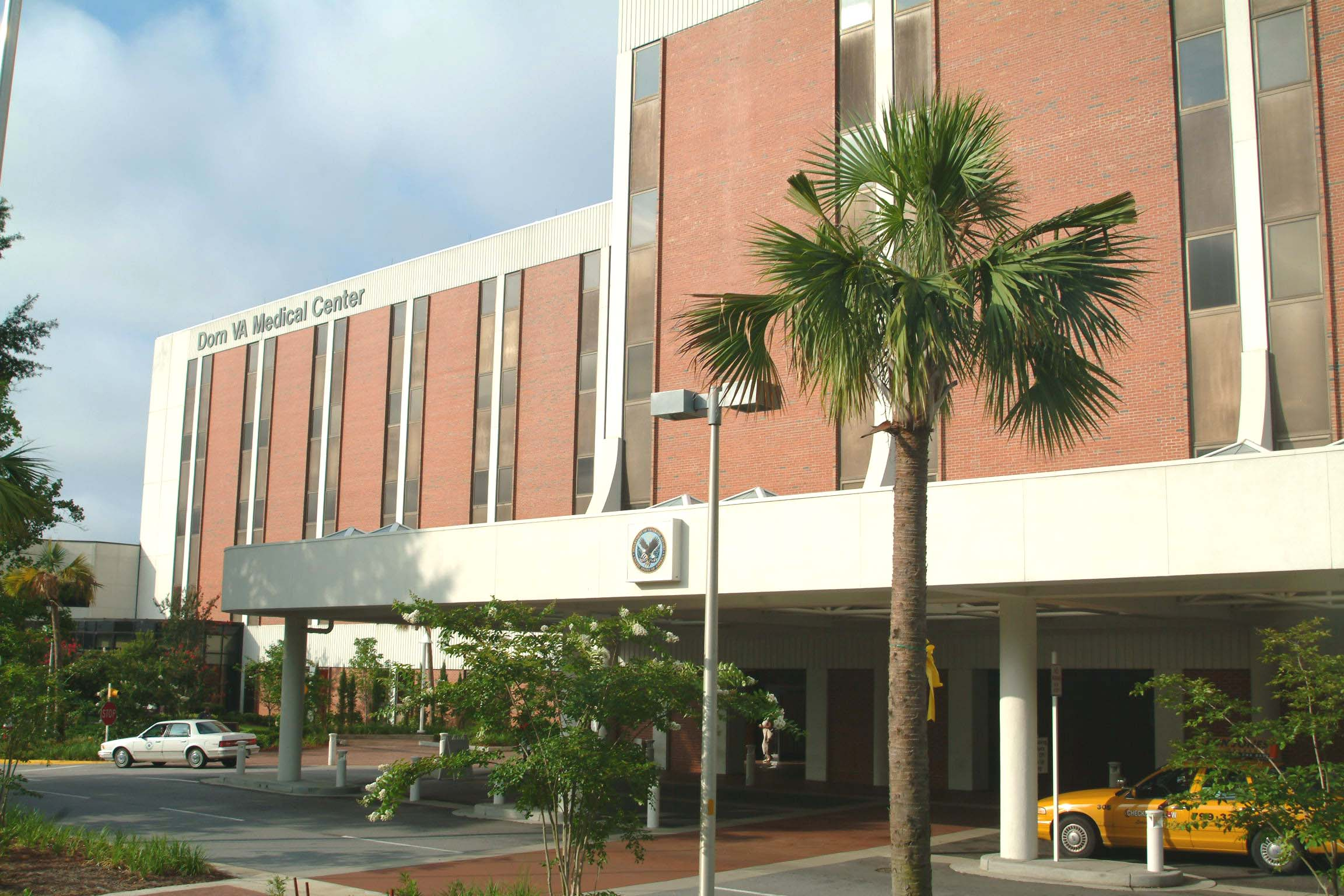

Geography
- Location: Columbia, SC, United States

Organization
- Care system: Veterans
- Type: General
- Affiliated university: University of South Carolina School of Medicine

Links
- Lists: Hospitals in the United States
- Veterans Hospital
- U.S. National Register of Historic Places
- U.S. Historic district
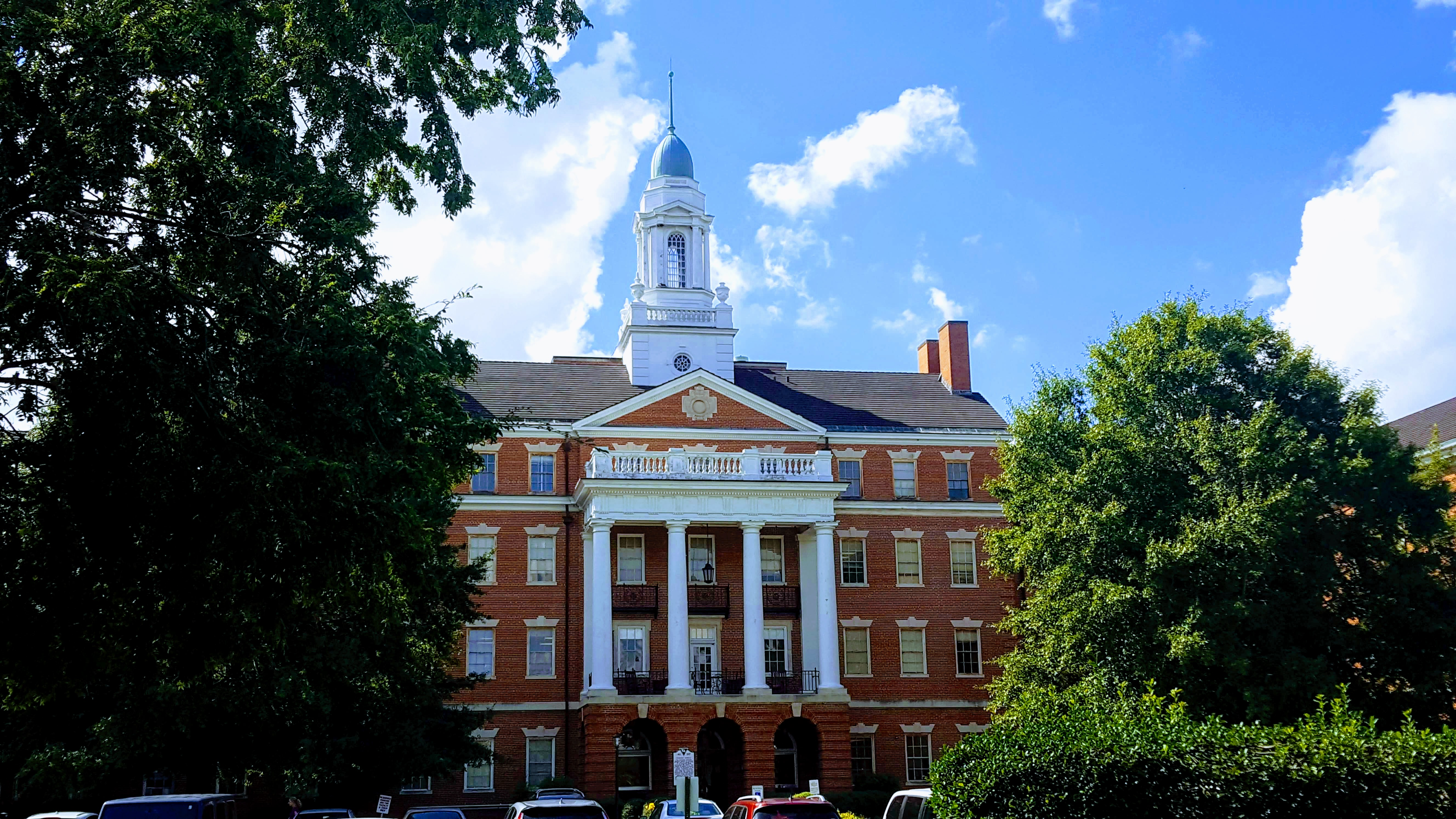

- Location within South Carolina Location within the United States
- Location: William Jennings Bryan Dorn Veterans Affairs Medical Center, University of South Carolina School of Medicine, Columbia, South Carolina
- Coordinates: 33°58′39″N 80°57′40″W
- Area: 42 acres (17 ha)
- Built: 1931-1932, 1937, 1945, 1946
- Architect: Miller, J. E.
- Architectural style: Colonial Revival
- NRHP reference No.: 09000062
- Added to NRHP: September 2, 2009

William Jennings Bryan Dorn Veterans Affairs Medical Center is a historic hospital complex and national historic district located at Columbia, South Carolina. The district encompasses 19 contributing buildings and a covered walk. Most of the oldest buildings are two- to three-story brick structures and feature a Georgian Colonial Revival architectural style. The original buildings date to 1932, with additional buildings completed in 1937, 1945, and 1946. A major expansion occurred in the 1970s. In 1978, President Jimmy Carter named the hospital after U.S. Representative from South Carolina, William Jennings Bryan Dorn. The complex includes the hospital, recreation, dining, and residential buildings. The complex is operated by the Veterans Health Administration.

It was added to the National Register of Historic Places in 2009.
