= 1960 United States Senate election in South Carolina =

1960 Democratic Senate primary in South Carolina
- June 4, 1960
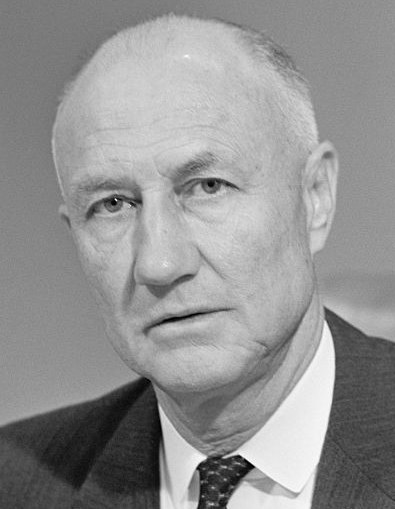

Nominee	Strom Thurmond	Robert B. Herbert
Party	Democratic	Democratic
Popular vote	273,795	32,136
Percentage	89.50%	10.50%
U.S. senator before election
Strom Thurmond
Democratic
Elected U.S. Senator
Strom Thurmond
Democratic

The 1960 South Carolina United States Senate election was held on November 8, 1960, to select the U.S. Senator from the state of South Carolina. Popular incumbent Senator Strom Thurmond easily won the Democratic primary and was unopposed in the general election.

This was Thurmond's last Senate race in which he ran as a Democrat; in 1964 he switched parties to Republican to oppose the Democrats' support for the Civil Rights Act of 1964 and continued to serve until he left office in 2003 and was succeeded by Lindsey Graham (R). This was the last time that Democrats won South Carolina's Class 2 Senate seat until 2026.

== Democratic primary ==
=== Candidates ===
- Robert Beverly Herbert, Columbia lawyer
- Strom Thurmond, incumbent Senator since 1954 and candidate for president in 1948

=== Campaign ===
Herbert argued that Thurmond's means of opposing the civil rights legislation in the 1950s was unconstructive and instead if he were in the Senate he would express to the country how the blacks were benefited by white rule. Herbert's campaign was little more than token opposition as Thurmond racked up a huge victory and won another term because he did not have an opponent in the general election.

=== Results ===
South Carolina U.S. Senate primary election, 1960
Party	Candidate	Votes	%
Democratic	Strom Thurmond (incumbent)	273,795	89.50%
Democratic	Robert Beverley Herbert	32,136	10.50%
Total votes		305,931	100.00%

== Election results ==
South Carolina U.S. Senate Election, 1960
Party	Candidate	Votes	%	±%
Democratic	Strom Thurmond (incumbent)	330,167	99.97%	−0.03%
Write-in		102	0.03%	0.0%
Total votes		330,269	100.0%	
Majority		330,065	100.0%	0.0%
Turnout		330,269	55.4%	+23.2%
Democratic hold				

== See also ==
- List of United States senators from South Carolina
- United States Senate elections, 1960
- United States House of Representatives elections in South Carolina, 1960
