= South Carolina's 1st congressional district =

U.S. House district for South Carolina

Coordinates: 33.15°N 79.70°W

- Interactive map of district boundaries since January 3, 2023
- Representative: Nancy Mace; R–Charleston
- Population (2025): 814,970
- Median household income: $95,842
- Ethnicity: 68.2% White; 16.9% Black; 8.1% Hispanic; 4.1% Two or more races; 1.8% Asian; 0.9% other
- Cook PVI: R+6

South Carolina's 1st congressional district is a coastal congressional district in South Carolina, represented by Republican Nancy Mace since January 3, 2021. She succeeded Democrat Joe Cunningham, having defeated him in the 2020 election. Cunningham was the first Democrat to represent the district since the 1980s.

The district has historically been based in Charleston. It has included Myrtle Beach, which became a major tourist destination in the late 20th century, as well as other coastal areas that have attracted retirees and seasonal visitors. From 1993 to 2013, the district boundaries extended from Seabrook Island in the south to the North Carolina border and included parts of Charleston, Dorchester, Berkeley and Georgetown counties and all of Horry County to the North Carolina line.

In 2010, the state received another seat in congressional apportionment due to an increase in population. The state's districts had to be redrawn, which was completed in 2013. In the final plan, the 1st congressional district was redrawn to reach from Hilton Head Island to mid-coast South Carolina, ending at the Santee River and comprising parts of Charleston, Berkeley, Dorchester and Beaufort counties. This configuration is similar to the one it had for most of the 20th century. Horry County was included in the new 7th congressional district.

On January 6, 2023, the district was declared unconstitutional by the U.S. District Court for the District of South Carolina on account of racial gerrymandering and would have to be redrawn in April of that year. The Supreme Court justices added Alexander v. South Carolina State Conference of the NAACP to their merits calendar for the 2023–24 term. At least fifteen amicus briefs were filed by various organizations and individuals with standing before the court. The case was argued on October 11, 2023. On March 28, 2024, the same district court that ruled the congressional district was unconstitutional, allowed for its use in the 2024 elections. It concluded that it would be impractical to create a new district map at the current time, mainly due to the upcoming military and overseas ballot mailing deadline of April 27 and statewide primaries on June 11. However, it still found the district to be in violation of the 14th amendment and believed future litigation is possible after the 2024 elections.

On May 23, 2024, the Supreme Court—in a 6–3 decision—ruled the district was constitutional, reversing the District of South Carolina's original ruling and officially allowing the state's current congressional map to be used for and past the 2024 elections. It also remanded the case back to the district court to rehear other claims made by the defendants.

It is the wealthiest congressional district in the state of South Carolina.

== History ==
Following the Civil War and granting of citizenship to former slaves, in 1870, Charleston's population was 53 percent black; and Charleston County had a 73 percent black majority. The city's large population of free people of color had developed many leaders who advanced in the changing society. These population majorities protected freedmen against some of the election-related violence that occurred in other parts of the state in the 1870s as white Democrats worked to suppress black voting and regain political control of the state. During Reconstruction, the mostly black Republicans from this district supported Republican candidates, including four terms for Joseph H. Rainey as US Representative to Congress, a record by an African-American legislator not surpassed until the 1950s.

After the Democrats regained control of the state in 1876, during an election season marked by violence and fraud, and Reconstruction ended in 1877, they passed laws establishing racial segregation and making voter registration and voting more difficult, such as the "eight-box law". African-American George W. Murray finally won in the disputed 1894 congressional election from this district; he challenged the Republican candidate's victory because of election fraud and was upheld by the House Committee on Elections. But passage of a new state constitution by Democrats in 1895 effectively disfranchised most African-American citizens in 1896. Their participation in the political system was ended for seven decades. The white Democrats established a one-party state and used various devices to maintain the exclusion of blacks until after passage of federal civil rights legislation in the mid-1960s.

Party realignments in the late 20th century resulted in many new black voters supporting the national Democratic Party. White conservatives in the South shifted and joined the Republican Party, in 1980 electing the first Republican congressman from the state to be elected in the 20th century. Since the buildup of the military in this region, especially the Navy, the area's white voters have supported conservative candidates.

Given the crippling of the Republican Party by the disfranchisement of blacks, a Republican was not elected to a full term in this district in the 20th century until 1980, when Tommy Hartnett was swept in by Reagan's coattails. But, his election represented a different party and was the result of a major realignment of white conservative voters in the late 20th century to the Republican, rather than the Democratic Party. Starting with national candidates in the late 1960s and 1970s, white voters in South Carolina began to shift to the Republican Party.

As after every decennial census, the state legislature conducted redistricting after the 1990 census. The white Republican-controlled legislature shifted most of Charleston's African-American majority areas into South Carolina's 6th congressional district, creating a majority-minority district. To make up for the loss of population, the 1st was extended all the way up the Atlantic coast to Myrtle Beach. The 2010 redistricting cut the district back to the southeastern corner of the state.

Since that time, the 1st congressional district has had a majority-white population. But, in 2008, with the appeal of the Barack Obama presidential campaign, Democrat Linda Ketner came within two points of winning the 1st district congressional seat. In the following off-year election of 2010, Republican Tim Scott won the seat with 65 percent of the vote.

During the 2018 South Carolina primaries on June 12, 2018, Mark Sanford lost re-nomination to the seat. The Republicans would go on to lose the seat to the Democrats after the district swung heavily to the Democrats in the 2018 midterm elections.

=== 2013 special election ===
Tim Scott, a Republican from North Charleston, was elected as the 1st district's representative in 2010. He resigned after he was appointed by Governor Nikki Haley to the United States Senate when Jim DeMint resigned on January 1, 2013.

The district boundaries had been redrawn in 2011. A special election was held on May 7, 2013 to fill the vacancy created by Scott's resignation. In a Primary Election held on March 19, 2013, Elizabeth Colbert-Busch, the sister of comedian Stephen Colbert, won the Democratic nomination. Former Governor Mark Sanford, who represented the district from 1995 to 2001, and former Charleston County Councilman Curtis Eilliott Bostic faced each other in a runoff Primary for the Republican nomination on April 2, 2013. Sanford won the nomination, and defeated challengers Colbert-Busch and South Carolina Green Party candidate Eugene Platt in the special election on May 7.

== Composition ==
For the 118th and successive Congresses (based on redistricting following the 2020 census), the district contains all or portions of the following counties and communities:

Beaufort County (15)
All 15 communities
Berkeley County (15)
All 15 communities
Charleston County (12)
Awendaw, Charleston (part; also 6th; shared with Berkeley County), Folly Beach, Isle of Palms, James Island, Kiawah Island, McClellanville, Mount Pleasant, Rockville, Seabrook Island, Sullivan's Island, Summerville (shared with Berkeley and Dorchester counties)
Colleton County (1)
Edisto Beach
Dorchester County (2)
North Charleston (part; also 6th; shared with Berkeley and Charleston counties), Summerville (shared with Berkeley and Charleston counties)
Jasper County (1)
Hardeeville (part; also 6th; shared with Beaufort County)

== Recent election results from statewide races ==
Year	Office	Results
2008	President	McCain 56–43%
2012	President	Romney 59–41%
2016	President	Trump 55–40%
2016	Senate	Scott 65–33%
2018	Governor	McMaster 53–47%
2018	Secretary of State	Hammond 57–43%
2018	Treasurer	Loftis 56–41%
2018	Attorney General	Wilson 54–44%
2020	President	Trump 53–45%
2020	Senate	Graham 54–45%
2022	Senate	Scott 62–38%
2022	Governor	McMaster 55–44%
2022	Secretary of State	Hammond 62–38%
2024	President	Trump 56–43%
2026	Senate	Andrews 52–45%
2026	Governor	Wilson 51–47%

== List of members representing the district ==
Member (Residence)	Party	Years	Cong ress	Electoral history	District location
District established March 4, 1789
William L. Smith (Charleston)	Pro-Administration	March 4, 1789 – March 3, 1795	1st 2nd 3rd 4th 5th	Elected in 1788. Re-elected in 1790. Re-elected in 1793. Re-elected in 1794. Re-elected in 1796. Resigned to become U.S. Minister to Portugal.	1789–1793 "Charleston Division" South Carolina congressional districts, 1789–1793 1st district, Charleston 2nd district, Beaufort-Orangeburg 3rd district, Georgetown-Cheraw 4th district, Camden 5th district, Ninety-Six
William L. Smith (Charleston)	Pro-Administration	March 4, 1789 – March 3, 1795	1st 2nd 3rd 4th 5th	Elected in 1788. Re-elected in 1790. Re-elected in 1793. Re-elected in 1794. Re-elected in 1796. Resigned to become U.S. Minister to Portugal.	1793–1833 "Charleston district"
William L. Smith (Charleston)	Federalist	March 4, 1795 – July 10, 1797	1st 2nd 3rd 4th 5th	Elected in 1788. Re-elected in 1790. Re-elected in 1793. Re-elected in 1794. Re-elected in 1796. Resigned to become U.S. Minister to Portugal.	1793–1833 "Charleston district"
Vacant		July 10, 1797 – November 23, 1797	5th		1793–1833 "Charleston district"
Thomas Pinckney (Charleston)	Federalist	November 23, 1797 – March 3, 1801	5th 6th	Elected to finish Smith's term. Re-elected in 1798. Retired.	1793–1833 "Charleston district"
Thomas Lowndes (Charleston)	Federalist	March 4, 1801 – March 3, 1805	7th 8th	Elected in 1800. Re-elected in 1803. Retired.	1793–1833 "Charleston district"
Robert Marion (Charleston)	Democratic-Republican	March 4, 1805 – December 4, 1810	9th 10th 11th	Elected in 1804. Re-elected in 1806. Re-elected in 1808. Retired and then resigned.	1793–1833 "Charleston district"
Vacant		December 4, 1810 – December 31, 1810	11th		1793–1833 "Charleston district"
Langdon Cheves (Charleston)	Democratic-Republican	December 31, 1810 – March 3, 1815	11th 12th 13th	Elected in 1810. Later elected to finish Marion's term and seated January 24, 1811. Re-elected in 1812. Retired.	1793–1833 "Charleston district"
Henry Middleton (Charleston)	Democratic-Republican	March 4, 1815 – March 3, 1819	14th 15th	Elected in 1814. Re-elected in 1816. Retired.	1793–1833 "Charleston district"
Charles Pinckney (Charleston)	Democratic-Republican	March 4, 1819 – March 3, 1821	16th	Elected in 1818. Retired.	1793–1833 "Charleston district"
Joel R. Poinsett (Charleston)	Democratic-Republican (Note: Supported the Jackson faction in the 1824 United States presidential election.)	March 4, 1821 – March 3, 1825	17th 18th 19th	Re-elected in 1820. Re-elected in 1823. Re-elected in 1824. Resigned to become U.S. Minister to Mexico.	1793–1833 "Charleston district"
Joel R. Poinsett (Charleston)	Jacksonian	March 4, 1825 – March 7, 1825	17th 18th 19th	Re-elected in 1820. Re-elected in 1823. Re-elected in 1824. Resigned to become U.S. Minister to Mexico.	1793–1833 "Charleston district"
Vacant		March 7, 1825 – May 17, 1825	19th		1793–1833 "Charleston district"
William Drayton (Charleston)	Jacksonian	May 17, 1825 – March 3, 1833	19th 20th 21st 22nd	Elected May 16, 1825 to finish Poinsett's term and seated December 5, 1825. Re-elected in 1826. Re-elected in 1828. Re-elected in 1830. Retired.	1793–1833 "Charleston district"
Henry L. Pinckney (Charleston)	Nullifier	March 4, 1833 – March 3, 1837	23rd 24th	Elected in 1833. Re-elected in 1834. Lost renomination and lost re-election as a Unionist.	1833–1843 [data missing]
Hugh S. Legaré (Charleston)	Democratic	March 4, 1837 – March 3, 1839	25th	Elected in 1836. Lost re-election.	1833–1843 [data missing]
Isaac E. Holmes (Charleston)	Democratic	March 4, 1839 – March 3, 1843	26th 27th	Elected in 1838. Re-elected in 1840. Redistricted to the 6th district.	1833–1843 [data missing]
James A. Black (Cherokee Iron Works)	Democratic	March 4, 1843 – April 3, 1848	28th 29th 30th	Elected in 1843. Re-elected in 1844. Re-elected in 1846. Died.	1843–1853 [data missing]
Vacant		April 3, 1848 – June 12, 1848	30th		1843–1853 [data missing]
Daniel Wallace (Jonesville)	Democratic	June 12, 1848 – March 3, 1853	30th 31st 32nd	Elected to finish Black's term. Re-elected in 1848. Re-elected in 1850. Retired.	1843–1853 [data missing]
John McQueen (Bennettsville)	Democratic	March 4, 1853 – December 21, 1860	33rd 34th 35th 36th	Redistricted from the 4th district and re-elected in 1853. Re-elected in 1854. Re-elected in 1856. Re-elected in 1858. Re-elected in 1860 but retired due to Civil War.	1853–1860 [data missing]
District inactive		December 21, 1860 – July 18, 1868	36th 37th 38th 39th 40th	Civil War and Reconstruction	
Benjamin F. Whittemore (Darlington)	Republican	July 18, 1868 – February 24, 1870	40th 41st	Elected to finish the short term. Also elected to the next term. Resigned.	1868–1873 [data missing]
Vacant		February 24, 1870 – December 12, 1870	41st		1868–1873 [data missing]
Joseph H. Rainey (Georgetown)	Republican	December 12, 1870 – March 3, 1879	41st 42nd 43rd 44th 45th	Elected to finish Wittemore's term. Also elected to the next full term. Re-elected in 1872. Re-elected in 1874. Re-elected in 1876. Lost re-election.	1868–1873 [data missing]
Joseph H. Rainey (Georgetown)	Republican	December 12, 1870 – March 3, 1879	41st 42nd 43rd 44th 45th	Elected to finish Wittemore's term. Also elected to the next full term. Re-elected in 1872. Re-elected in 1874. Re-elected in 1876. Lost re-election.	1873–1883 [data missing]
John S. Richardson (Sumter)	Democratic	March 4, 1879 – March 3, 1883	46th 47th	Elected in 1878. Re-elected in 1880. Retired.	1873–1883 [data missing]
Samuel Dibble (Orangeburg)	Democratic	March 4, 1883 – March 3, 1891	48th 49th 50th 51st	Elected in 1882. Re-elected in 1884. Re-elected in 1886. Re-elected in 1888. Retired.	1883–1893 [data missing]
William H. Brawley (Charleston)	Democratic	March 4, 1891 – February 12, 1894	52nd 53rd	Elected in 1890. Re-elected in 1892. Resigned to become U.S. District Judge.	1883–1893 [data missing]
William H. Brawley (Charleston)	Democratic	March 4, 1891 – February 12, 1894	52nd 53rd	Elected in 1890. Re-elected in 1892. Resigned to become U.S. District Judge.	1893–1903 [data missing]
Vacant		February 12, 1894 – April 12, 1894	53rd		1893–1903 [data missing]
James F. Izlar (Orangeburg)	Democratic	April 12, 1894 – March 3, 1895	53rd	Elected to finish Brawley's term. Retired.	1893–1903 [data missing]
William Elliott (Beaufort)	Democratic	March 4, 1895 – June 4, 1896	54th	Elected in 1894. Lost election contest.	1893–1903 [data missing]
George W. Murray (Rembert)	Republican	June 4, 1896 – March 3, 1897	54th	Won election contest. Lost re-election.	1893–1903 [data missing]
William Elliott (Beaufort)	Democratic	March 4, 1897 – March 3, 1903	55th 56th 57th	Elected in 1896. Re-elected in 1898. Re-elected in 1900. Retired to run for U.S. senator.	1893–1903 [data missing]
George S. Legaré (Charleston)	Democratic	March 4, 1903 – January 31, 1913	58th 59th 60th 61st 62nd	Elected in 1902. Re-elected in 1904. Re-elected in 1906. Re-elected in 1908. Re-elected in 1910. Re-elected in 1912 but died before next term began.	1903–1913 [data missing]
Vacant		January 31, 1913 – April 29, 1913	62nd 63rd		1903–1913 [data missing]
Vacant		January 31, 1913 – April 29, 1913	62nd 63rd		1913–1933; Berkeley, Charleston, Clarendon, Colleton, and Dorchester counties
Richard S. Whaley (Charleston)	Democratic	April 29, 1913 – March 3, 1921	63rd 64th 65th 66th	Elected to finish Legaré's term. Re-elected in 1914. Re-elected in 1916. Re-elected in 1918. Retired.	1913–1933; Berkeley, Charleston, Clarendon, Colleton, and Dorchester counties
W. Turner Logan (Charleston)	Democratic	March 4, 1921 – March 3, 1925	67th 68th	Elected in 1920. Re-elected in 1922. Lost renomination.	1913–1933; Berkeley, Charleston, Clarendon, Colleton, and Dorchester counties
Thomas S. McMillan (Charleston)	Democratic	March 4, 1925 – September 29, 1939	69th 70th 71st 72nd 73rd 74th 75th 76th	Elected in 1924. Re-elected in 1926. Re-elected in 1928. Re-elected in 1930. Re-elected in 1932. Re-elected in 1934. Re-elected in 1936. Re-elected in 1938. Died.	1913–1933; Berkeley, Charleston, Clarendon, Colleton, and Dorchester counties
Thomas S. McMillan (Charleston)	Democratic	March 4, 1925 – September 29, 1939	69th 70th 71st 72nd 73rd 74th 75th 76th	Elected in 1924. Re-elected in 1926. Re-elected in 1928. Re-elected in 1930. Re-elected in 1932. Re-elected in 1934. Re-elected in 1936. Re-elected in 1938. Died.	1933–1943 [data missing]
Vacant		September 29, 1939 – November 7, 1939	76th		1933–1943 [data missing]
Clara Gooding McMillan (Charleston)	Democratic	November 7, 1939 – January 3, 1941	76th	Elected to finish her husband's term. Retired.	1933–1943 [data missing]
L. Mendel Rivers (Charleston)	Democratic	January 3, 1941 – December 28, 1970	77th 78th 79th 80th 81st 82nd 83rd 84th 85th 86th 87th 88th 89th 90th 91st	Elected in 1940. Re-elected in 1942. Re-elected in 1944. Re-elected in 1946. Re-elected in 1948. Re-elected in 1950. Re-elected in 1952. Re-elected in 1954. Re-elected in 1956. Re-elected in 1958. Re-elected in 1960. Re-elected in 1962. Re-elected in 1964. Re-elected in 1966. Re-elected in 1968. Re-elected in 1970. Died.	1933–1943 [data missing]
L. Mendel Rivers (Charleston)	Democratic	January 3, 1941 – December 28, 1970	77th 78th 79th 80th 81st 82nd 83rd 84th 85th 86th 87th 88th 89th 90th 91st	Elected in 1940. Re-elected in 1942. Re-elected in 1944. Re-elected in 1946. Re-elected in 1948. Re-elected in 1950. Re-elected in 1952. Re-elected in 1954. Re-elected in 1956. Re-elected in 1958. Re-elected in 1960. Re-elected in 1962. Re-elected in 1964. Re-elected in 1966. Re-elected in 1968. Re-elected in 1970. Died.	1943–1953 [data missing]
L. Mendel Rivers (Charleston)	Democratic	January 3, 1941 – December 28, 1970	77th 78th 79th 80th 81st 82nd 83rd 84th 85th 86th 87th 88th 89th 90th 91st	Elected in 1940. Re-elected in 1942. Re-elected in 1944. Re-elected in 1946. Re-elected in 1948. Re-elected in 1950. Re-elected in 1952. Re-elected in 1954. Re-elected in 1956. Re-elected in 1958. Re-elected in 1960. Re-elected in 1962. Re-elected in 1964. Re-elected in 1966. Re-elected in 1968. Re-elected in 1970. Died.	1953–1963 [data missing]
L. Mendel Rivers (Charleston)	Democratic	January 3, 1941 – December 28, 1970	77th 78th 79th 80th 81st 82nd 83rd 84th 85th 86th 87th 88th 89th 90th 91st	Elected in 1940. Re-elected in 1942. Re-elected in 1944. Re-elected in 1946. Re-elected in 1948. Re-elected in 1950. Re-elected in 1952. Re-elected in 1954. Re-elected in 1956. Re-elected in 1958. Re-elected in 1960. Re-elected in 1962. Re-elected in 1964. Re-elected in 1966. Re-elected in 1968. Re-elected in 1970. Died.	1963–1973 [data missing]
Vacant		December 28, 1970 – April 27, 1971	91st 92nd		1963–1973 [data missing]
Mendel Jackson Davis (Charleston)	Democratic	April 27, 1971 – January 3, 1981	92nd 93rd 94th 95th 96th	Elected to finish Rivers's term. Re-elected in 1972. Re-elected in 1974. Re-elected in 1976. Re-elected in 1978. Retired for health reasons.	1963–1973 [data missing]
Mendel Jackson Davis (Charleston)	Democratic	April 27, 1971 – January 3, 1981	92nd 93rd 94th 95th 96th	Elected to finish Rivers's term. Re-elected in 1972. Re-elected in 1974. Re-elected in 1976. Re-elected in 1978. Retired for health reasons.	1973–1983 [data missing]
Thomas Hartnett (Charleston)	Republican	January 3, 1981 – January 3, 1987	97th 98th 99th	Elected in 1980. Re-elected in 1982. Re-elected in 1984. Retired to run for lieutenant governor of South Carolina.	1973–1983 [data missing]
Thomas Hartnett (Charleston)	Republican	January 3, 1981 – January 3, 1987	97th 98th 99th	Elected in 1980. Re-elected in 1982. Re-elected in 1984. Retired to run for lieutenant governor of South Carolina.	1983–1993 [data missing]
Arthur Ravenel Jr. (Mount Pleasant)	Republican	January 3, 1987 – January 3, 1995	100th 101st 102nd 103rd	Elected in 1986. Re-elected in 1988. Re-elected in 1990. Re-elected in 1992. Retired to run for governor of South Carolina.	1983–1993 [data missing]
Arthur Ravenel Jr. (Mount Pleasant)	Republican	January 3, 1987 – January 3, 1995	100th 101st 102nd 103rd	Elected in 1986. Re-elected in 1988. Re-elected in 1990. Re-elected in 1992. Retired to run for governor of South Carolina.	1993–1995 [data missing]
Mark Sanford (Charleston)	Republican	January 3, 1995 – January 3, 2001	104th 105th 106th	Elected in 1994. Re-elected in 1996. Re-elected in 1998. Retired to run for governor of South Carolina.	1995–2003 [data missing]
Henry Brown (Hanahan)	Republican	January 3, 2001 – January 3, 2011	107th 108th 109th 110th 111th	Elected in 2000. Re-elected in 2002. Re-elected in 2004. Re-elected in 2006. Re-elected in 2008. Retired.	1995–2003 [data missing]
Henry Brown (Hanahan)	Republican	January 3, 2001 – January 3, 2011	107th 108th 109th 110th 111th	Elected in 2000. Re-elected in 2002. Re-elected in 2004. Re-elected in 2006. Re-elected in 2008. Retired.	2003–2013 Horry; parts of Berkeley, Charleston, Dorchester, and Georgetown.
Tim Scott (North Charleston)	Republican	January 3, 2011 – January 2, 2013	112th	Elected in 2010. Re-elected in 2012, but resigned when appointed U.S. senator.	2003–2013 Horry; parts of Berkeley, Charleston, Dorchester, and Georgetown.
Vacant		January 2, 2013 – May 7, 2013	112th 113th		2003–2013 Horry; parts of Berkeley, Charleston, Dorchester, and Georgetown.
Vacant		January 2, 2013 – May 7, 2013	112th 113th		2013–2023 Parts of Beaufort, Berkeley, Charleston, Colleton, and Dorchester.
Mark Sanford (Charleston)	Republican	May 7, 2013 – January 3, 2019	113th 114th 115th	Elected to finish Scott's term. Re-elected in 2014. Re-elected in 2016. Lost renomination.	2013–2023 Parts of Beaufort, Berkeley, Charleston, Colleton, and Dorchester.
Joe Cunningham (Charleston)	Democratic	January 3, 2019 – January 3, 2021	116th	Elected in 2018. Lost re-election.	2013–2023 Parts of Beaufort, Berkeley, Charleston, Colleton, and Dorchester.
Nancy Mace (Charleston)	Republican	January 3, 2021 – present	117th 118th 119th	Elected in 2020. Re-elected in 2022. Re-elected in 2024. Retired to run for Governor of South Carolina.	2013–2023 Parts of Beaufort, Berkeley, Charleston, Colleton, and Dorchester.
Nancy Mace (Charleston)	Republican	January 3, 2021 – present	117th 118th 119th	Elected in 2020. Re-elected in 2022. Re-elected in 2024. Retired to run for Governor of South Carolina.	2023–present Beaufort and Berkeley; Parts of Charleston, Colleton, Dorchester, and Jasper.
Nancy Lacore (Charleston)	Democratic	January 3, 2027 –		Elected in 2026.	2023–present Beaufort and Berkeley; Parts of Charleston, Colleton, Dorchester, and Jasper.

== Past election results ==
=== 2012 ===
2012 South Carolina's 1st congressional district election (Note: The votes for the Democratic candidate includes votes cast for the candidate who also ran under the Working Families Party ticket.) (Note: Tim Scott resigned his seat in the 112th and 113th Congresses effective January 2, 2013, in order to be appointed to the United States Senate in place of Senator Jim DeMint, who resigned. As a result, the seat for the 1st congressional district was vacant from the onset of the 113th Congress.)
Party	Candidate	Votes	%
Republican	Tim Scott	179,908	62.0
Democratic	Bobbie G. Rose	103,557	35.7
Libertarian	Keith Blandford	6,334	2.2
Write-in		214	0.1
Total votes		290,013	100.0
Republican hold			

=== 2013 special election ===
2013 South Carolina's 1st congressional district special election
Party	Candidate	Votes	%
Republican	Mark Sanford	77,600	54.03%
Democratic	Elizabeth Colbert Busch	64,961	45.22%
Green	Eugene Platt	690	0.48%
Write-in		384	0.27%
Total votes		143,635	100.00%
Republican hold			

=== 2014 ===
2014 South Carolina's 1st congressional district election
Party	Candidate	Votes	%
Republican	Mark Sanford (incumbent)	119,392	93.4
Write-in		8,423	6.6
Total votes		127,815	100.0
Republican hold			

=== 2016 ===
2016 South Carolina's 1st congressional district election
Party	Candidate	Votes	%
Republican	Mark Sanford (incumbent)	190,410	58.6
Democratic	Dimitri Cherny	119,779	36.8
Libertarian	Michael Grier Jr.	11,614	3.6
American	Albert Travison	2,774	0.8
Write-in		593	0.2
Total votes		325,170	100.0
Republican hold			

=== 2018 ===
2018 South Carolina's 1st congressional district election
Party	Candidate	Votes	%
Democratic	Joe Cunningham	145,455	50.6
Republican	Katie Arrington	141,473	49.2
Write-in		505	0.2
Total votes		287,433	100.0
Democratic gain from Republican			

=== 2020 ===
2020 South Carolina's 1st congressional district election
Party	Candidate	Votes	%
Republican	Nancy Mace	216,042	50.6
Democratic	Joe Cunningham (incumbent)	210,627	49.3
Write-in		442	0.1
Total votes		427,111	100.0
Republican gain from Democratic			

=== 2022 ===
2022 South Carolina's 1st congressional district election
Party	Candidate	Votes	%
Republican	Nancy Mace (incumbent)	153,757	56.3
Democratic	Annie Andrews	115,796	42.4
Alliance	Joseph Oddo	2,634	0.9
Total votes		272,681	100.0
Republican hold			

=== 2024 ===
2024 South Carolina's 1st congressional district election
Party	Candidate	Votes	%
Republican	Nancy Mace (incumbent)	227,502	58.2
Democratic	Michael B. Moore	162,582	41.6
Write-in		693	0.2
Total votes		390,777	100.0
Republican hold			

== See also ==
- List of United States congressional districts
- South Carolina's congressional districts
