= James Mann (South Carolina politician) =

American politician (1920–2010)

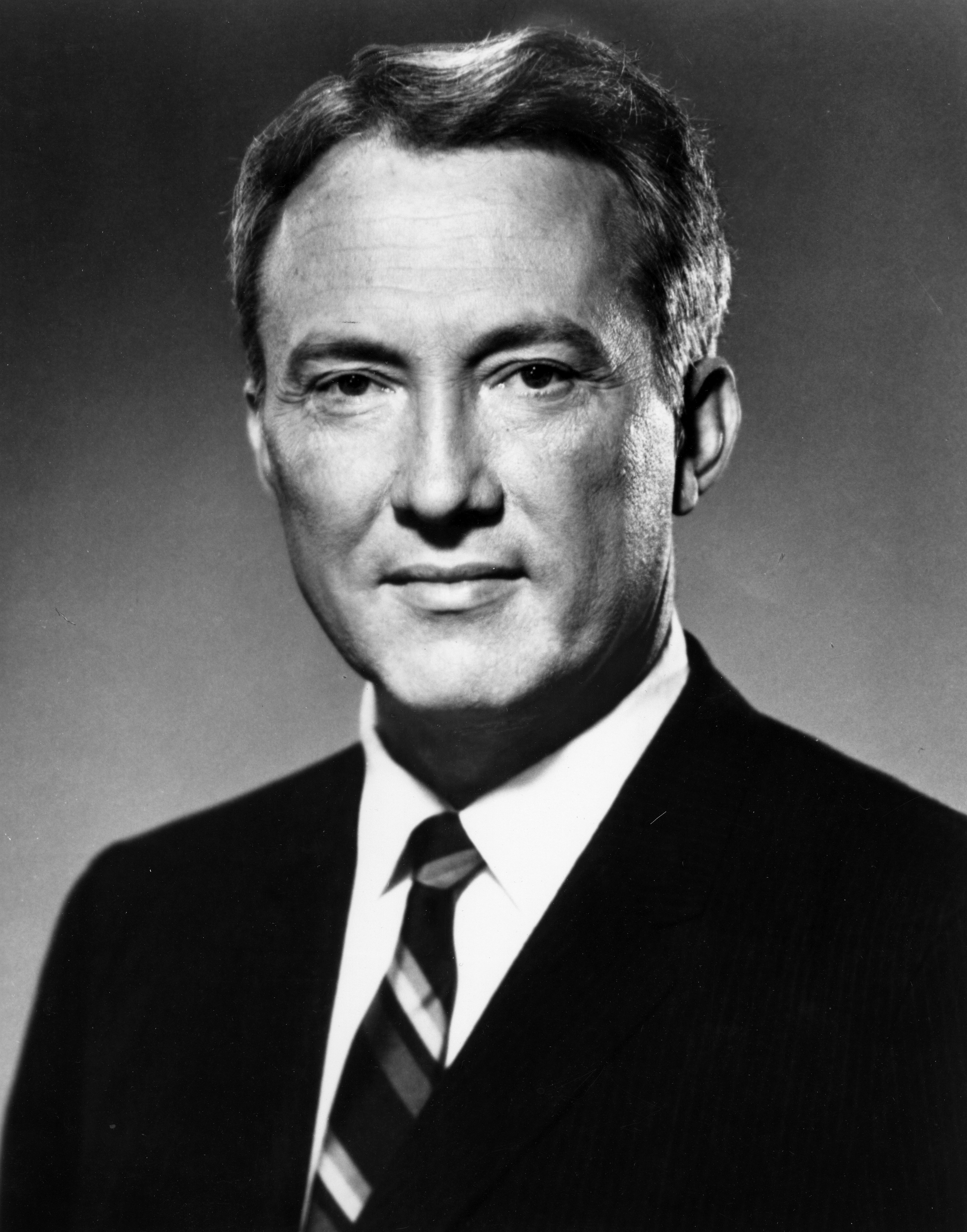

Member of the U.S. House of Representatives from South Carolina's 4th district
- In office January 3, 1969 – January 3, 1979
- Preceded by: Robert T. Ashmore
- Succeeded by: Carroll A. Campbell Jr.

Member of the South Carolina House of Representatives from Greenville County
- In office January 11, 1949 – January 13, 1953

Personal details
- Born: James Robert Mann; April 27, 1920 Greenville, South Carolina, U.S.
- Died: December 20, 2010 (aged 90) Greenville, South Carolina, U.S.
- Party: Democratic
- Spouse: Virginia Thomason Brunson (m. 1945)
- Profession: lawyer

Military service
- Allegiance: United States of America
- Branch/service: United States Army; United States Army Reserve
- Years of service: 1941–1946
- Rank: Colonel
- Battles/wars: World War II

James Robert Mann (April 27, 1920 – December 20, 2010) was a World War II soldier, lawyer and Democratic United States Representative from South Carolina.

== Early life and career ==
Mann was born in Greenville, to Alfred Clio Mann (1889–1956) and Nina Mae (Griffin) Mann. He graduated from Greenville High School in 1937. He then went to Charleston to receive his bachelor's degree at The Citadel in 1941. With the outbreak of World War II, Mann enlisted in the U.S. Army and served on active duty until 1946, when he became a reservist with the rank of colonel. After the war, Mann enrolled at the University of South Carolina School of Law where he was editor of the South Carolina Law Review and graduated magna cum laude in 1947 as a member of the Euphradian Society. He was admitted to the state bar the same year and established a private practice in Greenville.

== Political career ==
=== South Carolina House of Representatives ===
In 1948, Mann was elected to the South Carolina House of Representatives and he served for two terms until Governor James F. Byrnes appointed him as the circuit solicitor for the 13th judicial circuit of South Carolina to succeed Robert T. Ashmore in 1953. He was re-elected twice to that post and served until 1962. Afterwards, he became the secretary for the Greenville County Planning Commission and a trustee of the Greenville Hospital System.

=== US House of Representatives ===
In 1968, Mann won election to the U.S. House of Representatives as a Democrat to represent the 4th congressional district. In 1971, Mann was the sole member in the state's congressional delegation to vote for the Equal Employment Opportunity Act.

While in the House, Mann was a member of the Judiciary Committee that voted to recommend the impeachment of President Nixon, ultimately drafting portions of Articles I and II of the final report. His other committee assignments included the Select Committee on Crime, the Committee for the District of Columbia, and the Select Committee on Narcotics Abuse and Control.

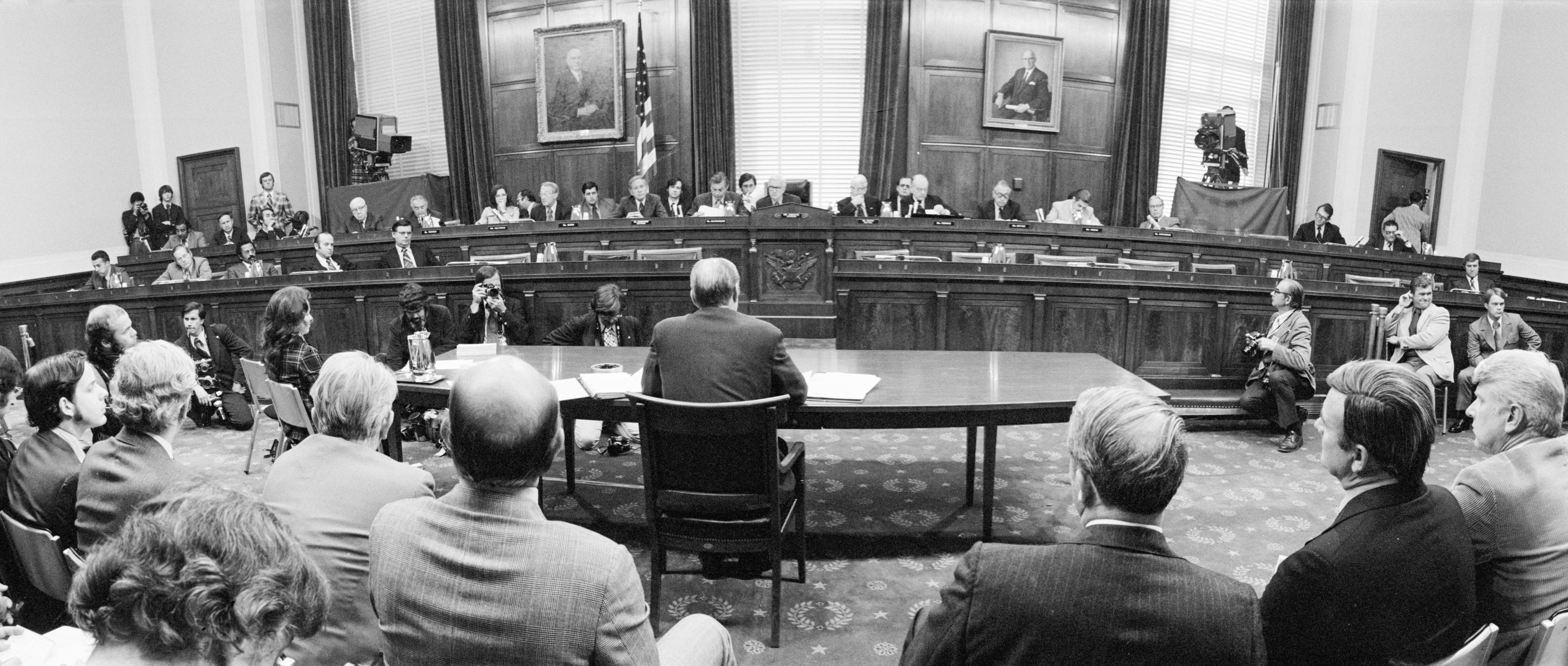
Mann sits on the House Judiciary Subcommittee in a hearing questioning President Gerald Ford on pardoning former President Richard Nixon, 1974.

Mann did not seek re-election in 1978 and left Congress to resume his law practice in Greenville.

== Accomplishments ==
Mann was a recipient of the Order of the Palmetto, South Carolina's highest civilian award.

== Notes ==
U.S. House of Representatives
Preceded by Robert T. Ashmore	Member of the U.S. House of Representatives from South Carolina's 4th congressional district 1969–1979	Succeeded by Carroll A. Campbell Jr.
