= Butler B. Hare =

American politician (1875–1967)

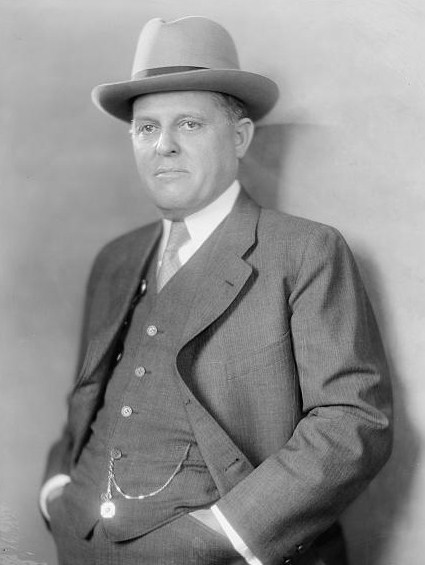

Member of the U.S. House of Representatives from South Carolina's 3rd district
- In office January 3, 1939 – January 3, 1947
- Preceded by: John C. Taylor
- Succeeded by: William Jennings Bryan Dorn

Member of the U.S. House of Representatives from South Carolina's 2nd district
- In office March 4, 1925 – March 3, 1933
- Preceded by: James F. Byrnes
- Succeeded by: Hampton P. Fulmer

Personal details
- Born: November 25, 1875 Edgefield County, South Carolina, U.S.
- Died: December 30, 1967 (aged 92) Saluda, South Carolina, U.S.
- Party: Democratic
- Spouse: Kate Etheridge
- Education: Newberry College (1899); George Washington University Law School (1910)
- Profession: Attorney

Butler Black Hare (November 25, 1875 – December 30, 1967) was an American politician who represented the state of South Carolina in the U.S. House of Representatives.

Born to James and Elizabeth Hare (née Black), he was one of nine sons born to the Civil War Confederate veteran. He graduated from Newberry College and earned his law degree from George Washington University. He served his first term in the U.S. House of Representatives in 1924, representing the 2nd district of South Carolina. He served from 1925 to 1933, and then did not run again after redistricting eliminated a seat from South Carolina's congressional delegation.

He returned to the House in 1939 after defeating incumbent John Taylor. He served from 1939 to 1947 as the representative from the 3rd District. His main accomplishment as a Representative was authoring the Hare–Hawes–Cutting Act, which grants a 10-year Commonwealth status and proposed that the former US Territory of the Philippines become an independent nation. It was later rejected by the Philippine Senate. The Act was later replaced with the Tydings–McDuffie Act in 1934.

His son James Butler Hare, whom he outlived by a year, served a single term from 1949 to 1951 in South Carolina's 3rd district.

U.S. House of Representatives
Preceded by James F. Byrnes	Member of the U.S. House of Representatives from South Carolina's 2nd congressional district 1925–1933	Succeeded by Hampton P. Fulmer
Preceded by John C. Taylor	Member of the U.S. House of Representatives from South Carolina's 3rd congressional district 1939–1947	Succeeded by William Jennings Bryan Dorn
