= Joseph R. Bryson =

American politician

Joseph Raleigh Bryson
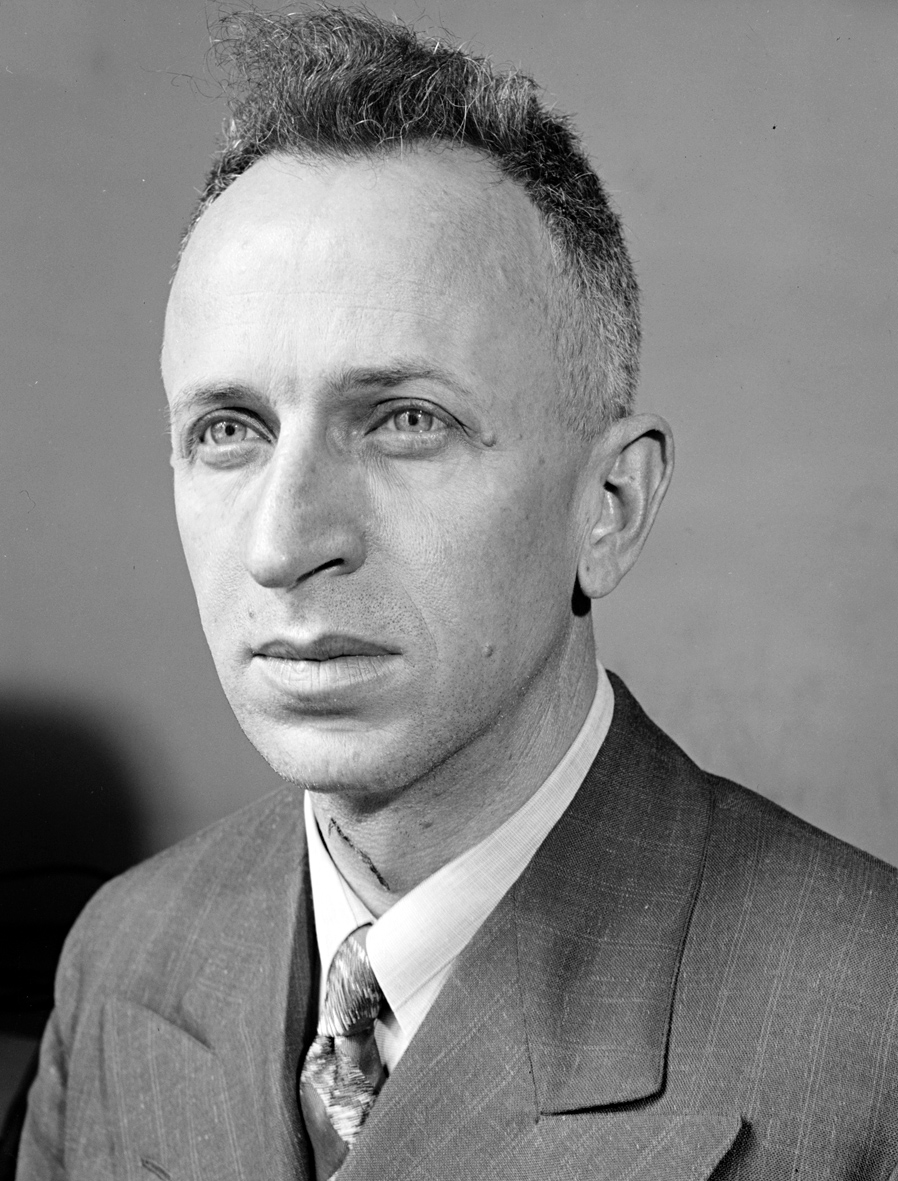

Member of the U.S. House of Representatives from South Carolina's 4th district
- In office January 3, 1939 – March 10, 1953
- Preceded by: Gabriel H. Mahon, Jr.
- Succeeded by: Robert T. Ashmore

Member of the South Carolina Senate from Greenville County
- In office January 8, 1929 – January 10, 1933

Member of the South Carolina House of Representatives from Greenville County
- In office January 11, 1921 – January 13, 1925

Personal details
- Born: January 18, 1893 Brevard, North Carolina, U.S.
- Died: March 10, 1953 (aged 60) Bethesda, Maryland, U.S.
- Resting place: Greenville, South Carolina
- Party: Democratic
- Education: Furman University; University of South Carolina
- Profession: lawyer

Military service
- Allegiance: United States of America
- Branch/service: South Carolina National Guard; United States Army
- Years of service: 1915 – 1916; 1917 – 1918
- Rank: Second Lieutenant
- Unit: Company A, First Infantry; Medical Reserve Corps
- Battles/wars: World War I

Joseph Raleigh Bryson (January 18, 1893 – March 10, 1953) was a U.S. representative from South Carolina.

Born in Brevard, North Carolina, Bryson moved, with his parents, to Greenville, South Carolina, in 1900. He attended the public schools. He graduated from Furman University, Greenville, South Carolina, in 1917 and with a law degree from the University of South Carolina at Columbia in 1920. Enlisted on September 28, 1915, as a private in Company A, First Infantry, South Carolina National Guard, and served until discharged on August 9, 1916. Bryson reenlisted on August 3, 1917, in the Medical Reserve Corps, and was discharged as a second lieutenant of Infantry on December 12, 1918. He was admitted to the bar in 1920 and commenced practice in Greenville, South Carolina. He served as member of the State house of representatives 1921-1924. He served in the State senate 1929-1932.

Bryson was elected as a Democrat to the Seventy-sixth and to the seven succeeding Congresses, and served from January 3, 1939, until his death from cerebral hemorrhage at the Bethesda Naval Hospital in Bethesda, Maryland, March 10, 1953. He was interred in Woodlawn Memorial Park, Greenville, South Carolina.

== See also ==
- List of members of the United States Congress who died in office (1950–1999)

== Sources ==
- United States Congress. "Joseph R. Bryson (id: B000999)". Biographical Directory of the United States Congress.
- The Joseph R. Bryson Papers, 1917-1953 at South Carolina Political Collections (University of South Carolina)
- Memorial services held in the House of Representatives together with remarks presented in eulogy of Joseph Raleigh Bryson, late a representative from South Carolina

U.S. House of Representatives
Preceded by Gabriel H. Mahon, Jr.	Member of the U.S. House of Representatives from South Carolina's 4th congressional district 1939 – 1953	Succeeded by Robert T. Ashmore
