= Thomas S. Gettys =

American politician

Thomas Smithwick Gettys
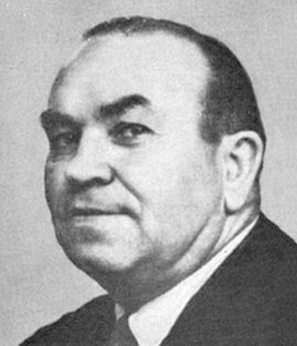

Member of the U.S. House of Representatives from South Carolina's 5th district
- In office November 3, 1964 – December 31, 1974
- Preceded by: Robert W. Hemphill
- Succeeded by: Kenneth Lamar Holland

Personal details
- Born: June 19, 1912 Rock Hill, South Carolina, U.S.
- Died: June 8, 2003 (aged 90) Rock Hill, South Carolina, U.S.
- Party: Democratic
- Education: Clemson College; Erskine College (A.B.); Duke University; Winthrop College
- Occupation: school administrator, lawyer

Military service
- Branch/service: United States Navy
- Years of service: 1942–1946

Thomas Smithwick Gettys (June 19, 1912 – June 8, 2003) was a U.S. representative from South Carolina.

Born in Rock Hill, South Carolina, Gettys was educated in the Rock Hill public schools. He attended Clemson College. Erskine College, A.B., 1933. He also completed graduate work at Duke University and Winthrop College. He was in the United States Navy from 1942 to 1946. He was a teacher. School administrator, Central School from 1935 to 1941. He served as staff for United States Representative James P. Richards from 1942 to 1951. Postmaster, Rock Hill, South Carolina from 1951 to 1954. He was a lawyer in private practice. Past member and chairman of the board of trustees of Rock Hill School District Three from 1953 to 1960.

Gettys was elected as a Democrat to the Eighty-eighth and to the Eighty-ninth Congress by special election to fill the vacancy caused by the resignation of United States Representative Robert W. Hemphill, and reelected to the four succeeding Congresses (November 3, 1964 – December 31, 1974). He resigned on December 31, 1974. He was not a candidate for reelection to the Ninety-fourth Congress in 1974. He died on June 8, 2003, in Rock Hill, South Carolina. He was interred in Neely's Creek Associate Reformed Church Cemetery, Rock Hill, South Carolina.

== Sources ==
- United States Congress. "Thomas S. Gettys (id: G000144)". Biographical Directory of the United States Congress.

U.S. House of Representatives
| Preceded by Robert W. Hemphill | Member of the U.S. House of Representatives from South Carolina's 5th congressional district 1964–1974 | Succeeded by Kenneth Lamar Holland |
