= James P. Richards =

American politician (1894–1979)

James Prioleau Richards
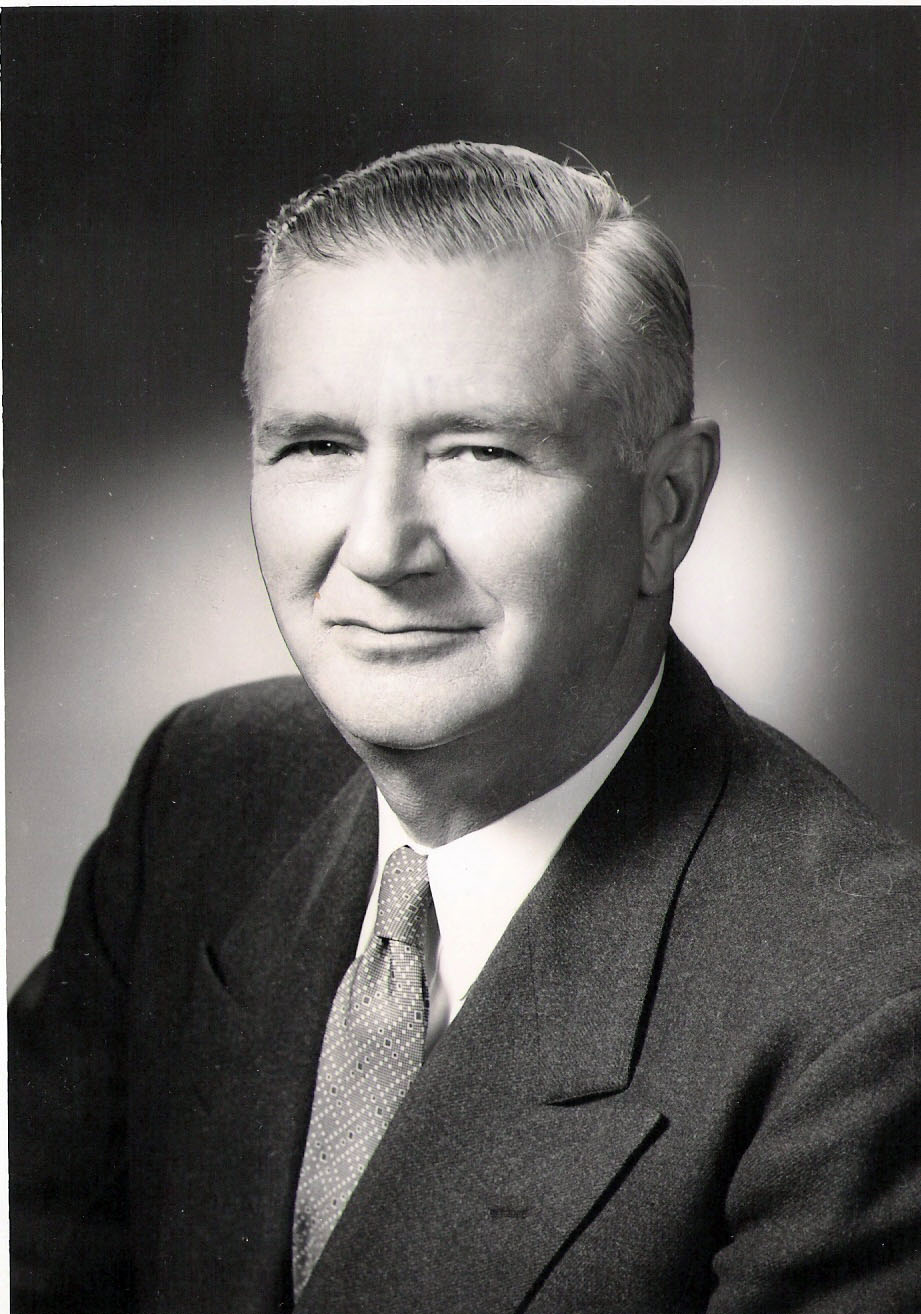
- Richards in 1956

Member of the U.S. House of Representatives from South Carolina's 5th district
- In office March 4, 1933 – January 3, 1957
- Preceded by: William F. Stevenson
- Succeeded by: Robert W. Hemphill

Chairman of the Committee on Foreign Affairs
- In office January 3, 1951 – January 3, 1953
- Preceded by: John Kee
- Succeeded by: Robert B. Chiperfield
- In office January 3, 1955 – January 3, 1957
- Preceded by: Robert B. Chiperfield
- Succeeded by: Thomas S. Gordon

Personal details
- Born: August 31, 1894 Liberty Hill, South Carolina, U.S.
- Died: February 21, 1979 (aged 84) Lancaster, South Carolina, U.S.
- Party: Democratic
- Education: Clemson College; University of South Carolina
- Occupation: lawyer

Military service
- Branch/service: United States Army
- Years of service: 1917 – 1919
- Rank: Second Lieutenant
- Unit: 118th Regiment, 30th Division
- Battles/wars: First World War

James Prioleau "Dick" Richards (August 31, 1894 – February 21, 1979) was a lawyer, judge, and Democratic U.S. Representative from South Carolina between 1933 and 1957. He later served as a special ambassador under Republican President Dwight D. Eisenhower.

== Background ==
Born in Liberty Hill, South Carolina, Richards attended in-state county schools and Clemson College, in Clemson.

== Career ==
During the First World War, Richards served overseas as a private, corporal, sergeant, and second lieutenant in the Trench Mortar Battery, Headquarters Company, 118th Infantry Regiment, 30th Division from 1917 to 1919.

=== Lawyer and judge ===
Richards graduated from the law department of the University of South Carolina at Columbia in 1921 and was admitted to the bar the same year, commencing practice in Lancaster, South Carolina. He served as judge of the probate court of Lancaster County, South Carolina, from 1923 to 1933.

=== Congressman ===
Richards was elected as a Democrat to the seventy-third Congress and reelected to the eleven succeeding Congresses (March 4, 1933 – January 3, 1957).

A confidential 1943 analysis of the House Foreign Affairs Committee by Isaiah Berlin for the British Foreign Office described Richards as having "supported the Administration on foreign policy before and after Pearl Harbor all the way with the single exception of the vote on lifting belligerent zones for American ships three weeks before Pearl Harbor ... Probably internationalist rather than nationalist in outlook". His voting record was "consistently pro-British". He voted in favor of the 1941 Lend Lease Act and in favor of the 1944 Lend Lease Act. In 1947-8, he served on the Herter Committee. During the Eighty-second and Eighty-fourth Congresses he served as chairman of the Committee on Foreign Affairs. In 1953, Richards served as delegate to the Japanese Peace Conference and United States delegate to the United Nations. Hoping to retire from Congress, he was not a candidate for reelection in 1956 to the Eighty-fifth Congress.

He was a signatory to the 1956 Southern Manifesto that opposed the desegregation of public schools ordered by the Supreme Court in Brown v. Board of Education.

=== Later life ===
He served as special assistant to President Eisenhower, January 1957–January 1958, for the Middle East, following announcement of the Eisenhower Doctrine. With this position, Richards held rank of ambassador. Following this, he resided in Lancaster, South Carolina, and resumed the practice of law.

Richards died there on February 21, 1979, and was interred in Liberty Hill Presbyterian Church Cemetery, Liberty Hill, South Carolina.

U.S. House of Representatives
Preceded by William F. Stevenson	Member of the U.S. House of Representatives from South Carolina's 5th congressional district 1933–1957	Succeeded by Robert W. Hemphill
Political offices
Preceded by John Kee	Chairman of House Foreign Affairs Committee; 1951 – 1953	Succeeded by Robert B. Chiperfield
Preceded by Robert B. Chiperfield	Chairman of House Foreign Affairs Committee; 1955 – 1957	Succeeded by Thomas S. Gordon
