= Robert T. Ashmore =

American politician (1904–1989)

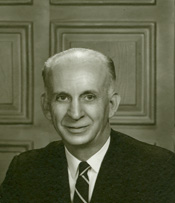

Member of the U.S. House of Representatives from South Carolina's 4th district
- In office June 2, 1953 – January 3, 1969
- Preceded by: Joseph R. Bryson
- Succeeded by: James R. Mann

Personal details
- Born: Robert Thomas Ashmore; February 22, 1904 Greenville, South Carolina, US
- Died: October 5, 1989 (aged 85) Greenville, South Carolina, US
- Party: Democratic
- Education: Furman University
- Occupation: Attorney

Military service
- Allegiance: United States of America
- Branch/service: United States Army; United States Army Reserves
- Years of service: 1942–1946; 1946–1955
- Rank: Colonel
- Battles/wars: World War II

Robert Thomas Ashmore (February 22, 1904 – October 5, 1989) was a U.S. representative from South Carolina, cousin of John D. Ashmore.

Born on a farm near Greenville, South Carolina, Ashmore attended the public schools of Greenville. He graduated from Furman University Law School, Greenville, South Carolina, in 1927. While a student he engaged in agricultural work, retail sales, and as a substitute rural mail carrier. He was admitted to the bar in January 1928 and engaged in the practice of law in Greenville, South Carolina. He served as solicitor of Greenville County Court from 1930–1934, and then as a solicitor of the thirteenth judicial circuit of South Carolina from 1936–1953. During World War II, while on official leave from duties as a solicitor, Ashmore volunteered for service in the United States Army in December 1942, serving in the United States and overseas until discharged from active duty in May 1946, as a lieutenant colonel in the United States Army Reserve. He was promoted to colonel in 1955.

Ashmore was elected as a Democrat to the Eighty-third Congress to fill the vacancy caused by the death of Joseph R. Bryson. He was reelected to the Eighty-fourth and to the six succeeding Congresses (June 2, 1953 – January 3, 1969), during which time he was a signatory to the 1956 Southern Manifesto that opposed the desegregation of public schools ordered by the Supreme Court in Brown v. Board of Education. Ashmore voted against the Civil Rights Acts of 1957, the Civil Rights Acts of 1960, the Civil Rights Acts of 1964, and the Civil Rights Acts of 1968 as well as the 24th Amendment to the U.S. Constitution and the Voting Rights Act of 1965. He was not a candidate for reelection in 1968 to the Ninety-first Congress. He resumed the practice of law.

He served as member of the board of South Carolina Appalachian Regional Planning and Development Commission (later South Carolina Appalachian Council of Governments) from 1970 to 1989, and chairman from 1970 to 1972. Ashmore was also elected to the Common Cause National Governing Board in 1973. He was a resident of Greenville, South Carolina, until his death there on October 5, 1989. He was interred in White Oak Baptist Church Cemetery, Greenville, South Carolina.

== Sources ==
- United States Congress. "Robert T. Ashmore (id: A000223)". Biographical Directory of the United States Congress.
- Robert T. Ashmore Papers can be found at South Carolina Political Collections at the University of South Carolina.

U.S. House of Representatives
Preceded by Joseph R. Bryson	Member of the U.S. House of Representatives from South Carolina's 4th congressional district 1953 – 1969	Succeeded by James R. Mann
