= L. Mendel Rivers =

American politician (1905–1970)

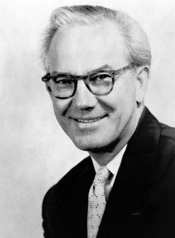

Member of the U.S. House of Representatives from South Carolina's 1st district
- In office January 3, 1941 – December 28, 1970
- Preceded by: Clara G. McMillan
- Succeeded by: Mendel Jackson Davis

Member of the South Carolina House of Representatives from Charleston County
- In office January 9, 1934 – June 6, 1936

Personal details
- Born: September 28, 1905 Gumville, South Carolina, U.S.
- Died: December 28, 1970 (aged 65) Birmingham, Alabama, U.S.
- Party: Democratic
- Spouse: Margaret Middleton Rivers (1938–1970)
- Children: 3, including L. Mendel Rivers, Jr.

Lucius Mendel Rivers (September 28, 1905 – December 28, 1970) was a Democratic U.S. representative from South Carolina, representing the Charleston-based 1st congressional district for nearly 30 years. As chair of the House Armed Services Committee, Rivers developed a reputation for his unwavering support of American involvement in the Vietnam War. His reputation suffered as the American public at large turned against further escalation in the Vietnam War. In 1968, Rivers condemned American servicemen who attempted to stop the My Lai massacre, labeling them as "traitors". Rivers served in the House until his death in 1970.

== Early life and education ==
Mendel Rivers was born in Gumville, South Carolina, to Lucius Hampton Rivers and Henrietta Marion McCay. The family moved to a farm in St. Stephen in 1907 and lived comfortably until 1915. That year the father Lucius died from pneumonia. Mendel's older brother Earle was put in charge of running the farm, but was not interested in agriculture. At the same time, agriculture suffered financial pressures and the family's assets declined. Eventually, they moved to North Charleston, where they opened a boarding house on O'Hear Avenue.

Rivers attended local public schools. He took six years to graduate from Charleston High School in 1926. He attended the College of Charleston for three years and the University of South Carolina School of Law for two years, graduating from neither. The law school dean at the University of South Carolina advised Rivers to take up another profession because, although he knew the assignments, he suffered from stage fright. Rivers was determined to become a lawyer so he returned to College of Charleston, took classes to prepare himself for the bar examination.

== Career ==
After passing the bar exam in 1932, he was unable to find work in Charleston law firms during the Great Depression, so he started his own practice.

== Entry into politics ==
Rivers first became involved in politics in 1930 when he participated in Ed Pritchard's unsuccessful campaign for the state legislature against Russell McGowan. He was an active member of the Charleston Young Democrats club and shortly after passing the bar, Rivers decided to run for one of the twelve state representative spots from Charleston County. County politics in the 1930s were controlled by the political machine of Charleston mayor Burnet R. Maybank, and gaining his endorsement was crucial to winning an election. Rivers sought the mayor's blessing, but was rejected because he was an unknown candidate from North Charleston. He ran as an Independent Democrat and was defeated in his bid for election.

A vacancy on the Charleston County delegation arose in 1933 when Ben Scott Whaley resigned to join the staff of Senator James Francis Byrnes. Rivers won the special election by running against Charleston and campaigning on the slogan "Give the Northern End of the County Representation." In 1934, Rivers ran for re-election and received the most votes of any state House candidate on the Charleston County ticket, making him chairman of the county delegation. As a state Representative, Rivers served on the Judiciary and Education committees. He became the state president of the Young Democrats in 1935 and was a delegate to the 1936 Democratic National Convention.

The rapid ascendancy of Rivers attracted the attention of 1st district Congressman Thomas S. McMillan who became worried when Rivers requested papers from the state Democratic secretary in 1936 to run for office. McMillan arranged a meeting with Rivers and offered him a position as a Special Assistant to the Attorney General of the United States. Rivers accepted and worked throughout the South collecting unpaid criminal fines and forfeited bail bonds.

=== 1940 election ===
On September 29, 1939, McMillan died and Rivers immediately made plans to run for Congress. He quit his federal job in February 1940 and opened a law practice in Charleston to provide a base for his campaign. His opponent in the Democratic primary was Alfred von Kolnitz, who had the backing of the Charleston political establishment and Thomas McMillan's widow, Clara. Rivers knew that he was not going to win the vote in Charleston, so he tried to maximize his vote outside of Charleston by making the theme of his campaign about the chicanery of the city. Furthermore, with World War II raging in Europe, Rivers played up von Kolnitz's German name to make him appear as if a Nazi sympathizer. He was aided in this effort by the fact that von Kolnitz was outspokenly antisemitic, and was in favor of isolationism (von Kolnitz advocated that the U.S. not help the United Kingdom in the British war effort against the Nazis). On August 27, Rivers won the Democratic primary election by running up a huge margin in the counties outside of Charleston, which offset his loss in Charleston County. In those days, victory in the Democratic primary was tantamount to election in South Carolina, and Rivers took office on January 3, 1941. Making good on his pro-British campaign rhetoric, Rivers voted in favor of the first Lend Lease Act in 1941 to lend material military aid to the British Army and Royal Navy, as well as food aid for British soldiers and civilians. He then voted to extend the lend lease act in 1944.

== Congressional career ==
=== Domestic legislation ===
Once in Congress, Rivers sought a seat on the Agriculture committee, but it was full and he was instead placed on the Merchant Marine and Fisheries committee. In March, he was appointed to the Naval Affairs committee which was later combined with the Military Affairs committee to form the House Armed Services Committee. His first legislative success was in 1942 when he authored a bill to build an oil pipeline from Mississippi to the Southeast coast to reduce the transportation costs of the product. The bill was passed by Congress and signed by President Roosevelt, but Secretary of the Interior Harold L. Ickes refused to construct the pipeline because of the opposition by Big Oil.

Rivers's first major success was the repeal of the federal tax on colored oleomargarine. The tax was first implemented because margarine was a much cheaper substitute of butter which threatened the interests of the dairy farmers. When Rivers first introduced the bill in 1944 to repeal the tax, it was vigorously opposed by Midwestern Representatives and the bill died in the agriculture committee. Undeterred, Rivers reintroduced the bill every year and made so many speeches in favor of the repeal of the tax that he was nicknamed "Oleo" Rivers. In 1949, he circulated a petition in the House to force the bill out of the agriculture committee and to the full House for a vote. The bill passed the House and then the Senate and was signed into law by President Truman in 1950. The manufacturers of margarine were forever grateful to Rivers and sent him complimentary boxes of oleo until the day he died.

Rivers was once described as being “something of a populist” in regards to his poor white constituents, with a 1971 article noting that he voted for some anti-poverty bills together with housing subsidies and food stamps, while a 1988 article reflecting on Rivers described his voting record as being “consistently the most liberal of any South Carolina congressman,” often voting on domestic issues “with the most liberal of the Eastern establishment.” Despite this, Rivers often voted against social measures such as increases in the federal minimum wage and the establishment of Medicare.

=== Views regarding race ===
Like most South Carolinian Democrats from his era, Rivers, who became of member of the Citizens' Councils, was an ardent segregationist. Rivers and the entire South Carolina delegation signed the Southern Manifesto in 1956. Rivers voted against the Civil Rights Acts of 1957, the Civil Rights Acts of 1960, the Civil Rights Acts of 1964, and the Civil Rights Acts of 1968 as well as the 24th Amendment to the U.S. Constitution and the Voting Rights Act of 1965.

Rivers attempted to have Charleston federal district court judge J. Waties Waring impeached for having ruled that blacks had to be allowed to vote in the Democratic primary and that segregated schools were unconstitutional. In South Carolina in the 1940s the Democratic Party had all-white primary elections, which was contested in the court case Elmore v. Rice where George Elmore was represented by Harold Boulware and Thurgood Marshall and the NAACP. Judge Waring ruled in favor of Elmore in 1947, but the ruling was rebuffed by South Carolina outside of Richland County. In a second case Brown v. Baskin (1948), Judge Waring once again ruled that the South Carolina Democratic Party must hold primaries that are "freely open to all parties... without discrimination of race, color or creed." Judge Waring was eventually forced to leave South Carolina after his dissenting opinion in Briggs v. Elliot (1951), which challenged segregation in public schools, eventually becoming one of five cases that was seen by the U.S. Supreme Court in Brown v. Board of Education. Despite Rivers' fundraising campaign against him, Judge Waring was not impeached, but he eventually moved to New York to continue his work as a federal judge where he died in 1968. Judge Waring was buried in Magnolia Cemetery on Meeting Street in Charleston and his funeral was attended by more than 200 blacks and less than a dozen whites. When President Truman integrated the U.S. Army in 1948, Rivers called him a "dead chicken" and a "bankrupt politician". Rivers was so incensed by Truman that he supported Strom Thurmond in the 1948 Presidential election. After Truman's victory, he lost his patronage privileges and was lucky to retain his seat on the Armed Services Committee.

Rivers attended the 1952 Democratic National Convention and believed that Adlai Stevenson would reverse the policies of Truman by returning to traditional Democratic principles. However, Rivers became disillusioned with Stevenson and he openly supported Republican Dwight D. Eisenhower in the 1952 Presidential election because he said that he would be sensitive to Southern concerns. Rivers's long-held distrust of Republicans was reinforced shortly after Eisenhower became president when he ordered the desegregation of all schools on military bases and did not grant Rivers patronage privileges, despite Rivers being the only Democratic member of Congress to support Eisenhower in 1952. Eisenhower's continual push for integration infuriated Rivers. When asked if he would back Eisenhower again in 1956, Rivers later claimed to have responded "Hell no! Ain't no education in the second kick of a mule."

In the 1960s, Rivers softened his vocal opposition to civil rights legislation. He had risen in the ranks and his power in the House depended upon the continual support of national Democrats. Rivers shifted his approach from defending segregation to the maintenance of law and order. He found a kindred spirit in George Wallace and he attended one of Wallace's fundraising dinners in 1968. Wallace asked Rivers in July to be his running mate for the 1968 Presidential election, but Rivers dared not risk losing his chairmanship of the House Armed Services Committee and declined the offer.

=== House Armed Services Chairman ===
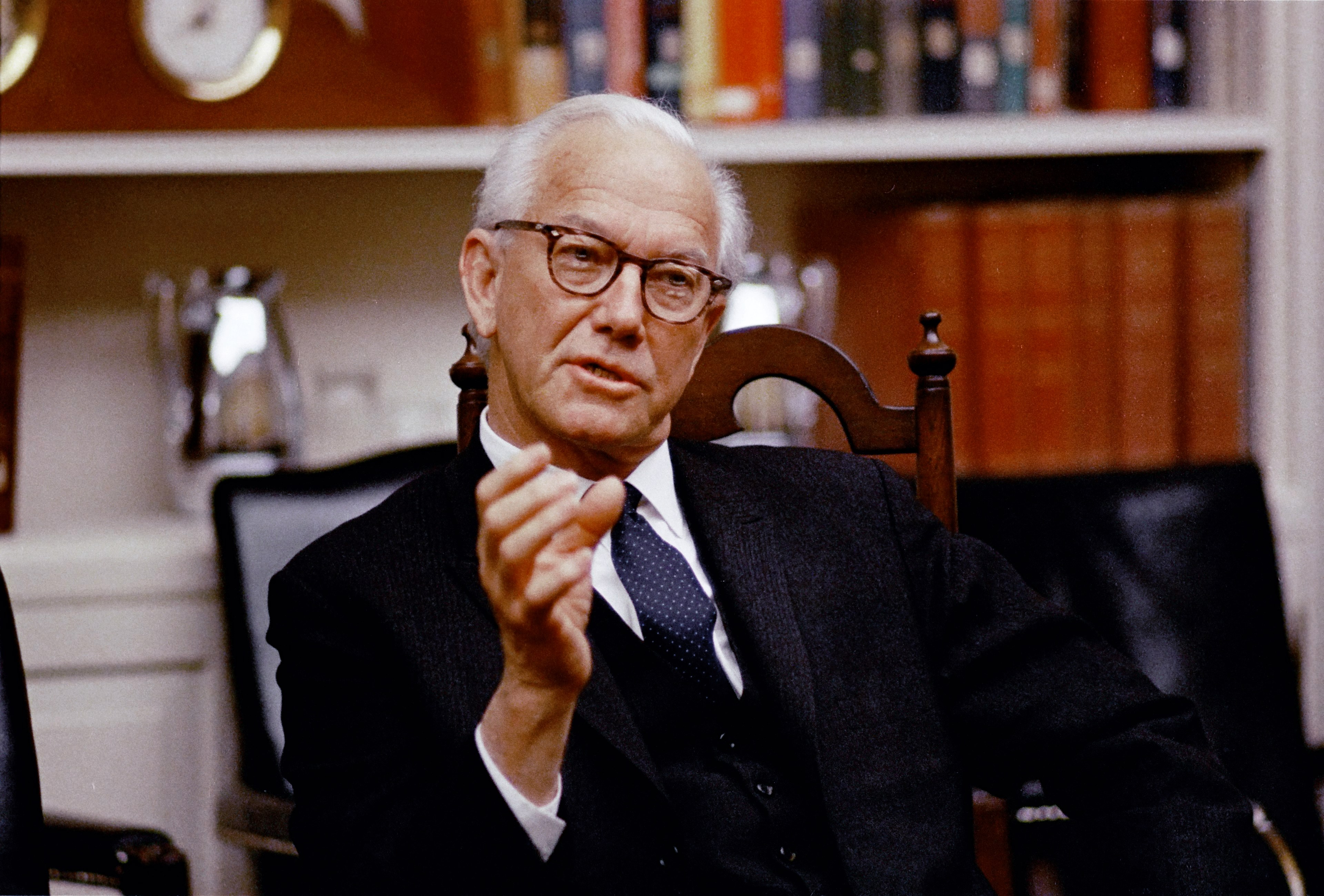
L. Mendel Rivers at the White House, March 7, 1968

Rivers became the chairman of the House Armed Services Committee in 1965 following the retirement of Carl Vinson. Upon moving into the Rayburn House Office Building, Rivers placed a plaque of Article 1, Section 8 of the United States Constitution that specified the role of the legislative process with the military. He felt that the Congress should not delegate its powers to the President nor the Secretary of Defense, and that a vigorous Congress would make the President perform his job better. As Rivers inspected the committee room, he became incensed when he discovered there were cloakrooms adjoining the chamber for use by Democratic and Republican Party members to discuss their strategies. Viewing national defense as a non-partisan issue, Rivers had the cloakrooms turned into offices.

By the time Rivers became the chairman, he was well known for being a strong supporter of the American military in general, and of enlisted military service members in particular. In 1963 he established, through the vehicle of the House–Senate Conference Committee, the principle of linking military retired pay to increases in the Consumer Price Index (CPI), similar to the practice for retired federal civil servants. In 1964 he championed the cause of "hospital rights," guaranteeing medical care in military hospitals for military retirees and their dependents.

After becoming chairman, in 1965 he helped secure the first military pay raise since 1952, despite opposition from the Secretary of Defense McNamara and President Johnson. Rivers was instrumental in establishing the additional enlisted pay grade of E-9, and he helped secure mobile home allowances and cheap air fares for soldiers returning from Vietnam.

Rivers strongly supported the constant upgrading of US military preparedness, regardless of the cost. He supported making all US Navy ships nuclear powered, and he championed development of the US Air Force's C-5A Galaxy military airlift jet, despite huge cost overruns. In his last speech to his colleagues in the US House of Representatives on December 7, 1970, delivered just before he departed for Birmingham, Alabama to have heart surgery, he stated, "While we debate the question of maintaining our military capability, the Soviet Union forges ahead. We seem hell-bent on national suicide....We cannot as a nation afford to spend one penny less on national defense than that amount which is required to insure that you and I, and our children, can convince the Soviets they dare not pull the trigger when a Soviet gun is placed against our heads."

In that same speech, he delivered the quote for which he is best remembered: "The final measure of our ability to survive as a nation in a hostile world will not be how well we have managed our domestic resources and domestic programs, but whether or not we have avoided and frustrated the forces of evil which would draw us into the crucible of war with the Soviet Union. If we fail in that endeavor, we will have failed in everything."

=== Vietnam War, and cover-up of My Lai massacre ===
Rivers was initially skeptical of the administration's escalation of the Vietnam War and its decision to send combat troops to Vietnam, but later became one of the strongest Congressional supporters of the war. He enjoyed referring to himself as "The Granddaddy of the War Hawks." He urged the President to use nuclear weapons against the North Vietnamese and to invade and occupy Hanoi, and once said that the United States should "flatten Hanoi and tell world opinion to go fly a kite."

During a Congressional investigation of the 1968 My Lai massacre, Rivers criticized Army helicopter pilot CW2 (later Major) Hugh Thompson, Jr. for giving the order to his men to fire upon American soldiers at Mỹ Lai if they continued to shoot unarmed Vietnamese civilians, calling him a traitor and saying he should be prosecuted. Rivers was unable to believe that American soldiers would do such a thing and denied that any massacre ever happened. He attempted to protect Army 2nd Lt. William Calley, later convicted of 22 killings at Mỹ Lai, by quickly holding hearings of his subcommittee on Mỹ Lai. He called every major witness to the event (including Thompson) before the subcommittee, and then refused to release the transcripts of the testimony. This meant that military prosecutors would be prohibited from calling those persons as witnesses at Calley's court martial. For this, Rivers is remembered as a Congressman who tried to cover up a massacre in the Vietnam war and court-martial the man who stopped it.

== Death and burial ==
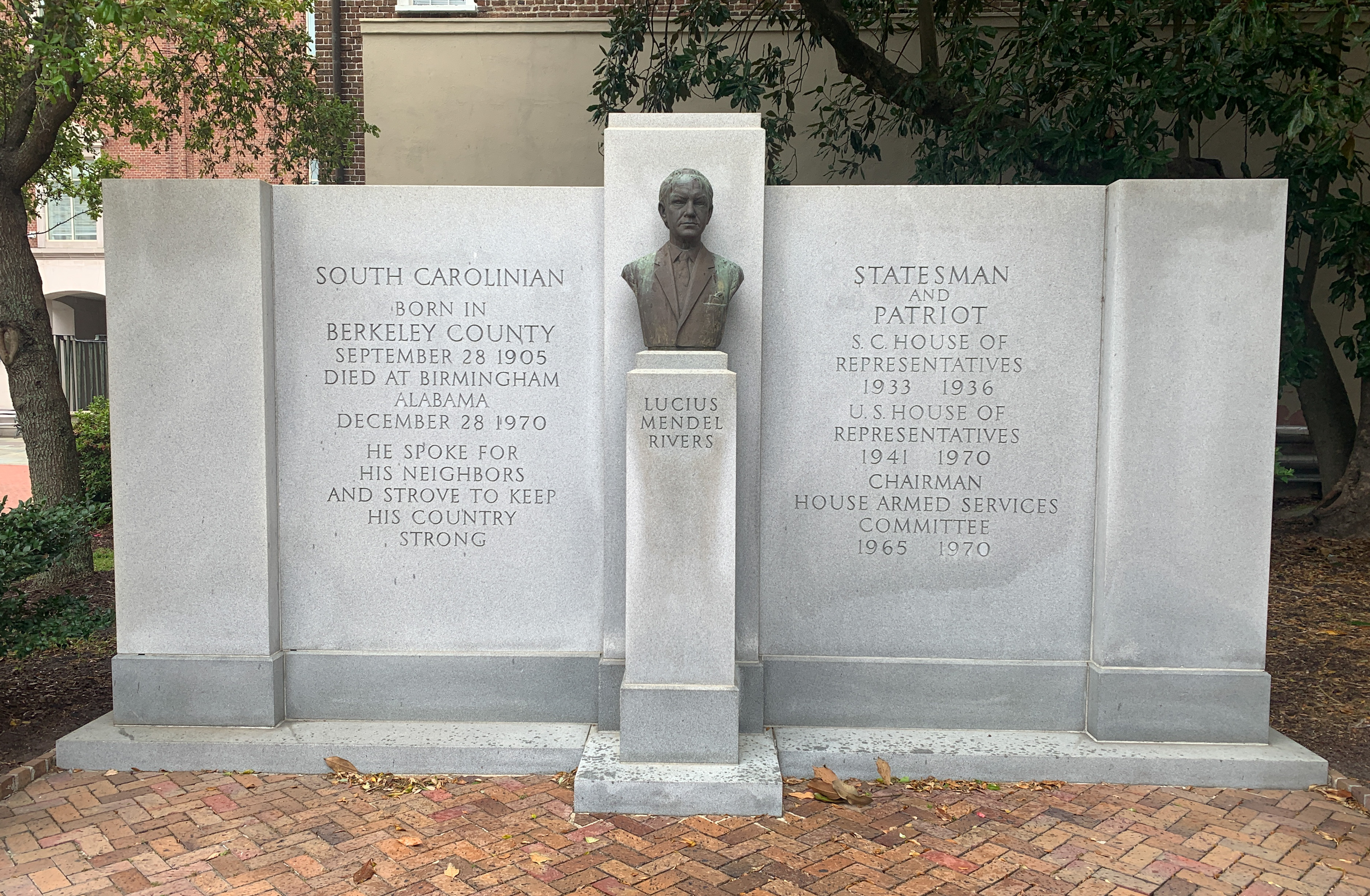
Mendel Rivers Monument, Charleston, South Carolina

In November 1970, Rivers was elected to his 16th term in Congress. He died of heart failure in Birmingham, Alabama, on December 28, 1970. It was 17 days after he had undergone surgery to replace a leaking mitral valve at the University of Alabama Hospital. He was buried at St. Stephen Episcopal Church Cemetery in St. Stephen, South Carolina.

== Personal life ==
Rivers married Margaret Middleton (called Marguerite by Mendel, but Marwee by family and friends) on September 1, 1938. They had first met in 1930 at Camp Kanuga, near Hendersonville, North Carolina. Mendel had impressed Marwee by being elected Best Boy Camper, although he was a 24-year-old law student. The couple had three children: Peggy in 1939, Marion in 1943, and Mendel Jr. in 1947.

Rivers belonged to the Episcopal Church. In fraternal societies, he was a member of the Freemasons (Landmark Lodge No. 76, A.F.M.), the Benevolent and Protective Order of Elks, and the Exchange Club. He was an enthusiast of boxing, and was friends with both Jack Dempsey and Gene Tunney. He enjoyed playing baseball and he batted well over .300 in the Congressional Baseball Games.

According to journalists, Rivers struggled with alcoholism for much of his life. He was said to be the "binger" variety of alcoholic, one who is generally sober but relapses periodically. Washington syndicated columnist Drew Pearson called him a "security risk" because of this. He devoted eight pages to Rivers in his book The Case Against Congress (1968).

== Honors ==
- In 1948, a stretch of highway, from the crossing of U.S. Route 78 over Meeting Street (known as the Five-Mile Viaduct) to where U.S. Route 52 meets the Berkeley County line, was named as Rivers Avenue. Rivers had been key in getting funds from Congress to pave it as the first four-lane road in North Charleston.
- In 1964 the town of St. Stephen held a day-long celebration for Rivers, naming as Mendel Rivers Road the secondary road that ran from St. Stephen's Episcopal Church to his childhood home.
- In 1964 a seven-story office building, located across Meeting Street from Marion Square, was informally named the L. Mendel Rivers Federal Building. It was later adapted as a hotel.
- The L. Mendel Rivers Elementary School in Altus, Oklahoma was named for Rivers because he prevented the Altus Air Force Base from being closed.
- Charleston Southern University honored Rivers's support of the institution by naming its college library as the L. Mendel Rivers Library in October 1970.
- US soldiers referred to a road in Cam Ranh Bay, Vietnam as called the Mendel Rivers Parkway. Soldiers gave Rivers a captured Viet Cong carbine that he prominently displayed in his office. For obtaining reduced air fares for soldiers on furlough, they gave him a cap with six stars and "The Big Boss" inscribed on it, indicating that Rivers outranked all military officials.
- After his death, in 1971 the Navy honored him by naming a submarine USS L. Mendel Rivers (SSN-686).
- Friends of Rivers raised funds to create a small park in downtown Charleston and commissioned a bust of him to be placed adjacent to the O.T. Wallace County Office Building.
- Rivers was named as one of the "Magnificent Ten Charlestonians Who Shaped the 20th Century" by Charleston Magazine in December 1999 for his success in expanding the military in his congressional district.

== See also ==
- NASCAR National Commissioner
- List of members of the United States Congress who died in office (1950–1999)

== Notes ==
U.S. House of Representatives
Preceded by Clara G. McMillan	Member of the U.S. House of Representatives from South Carolina's 1st congressional district 1941–1970	Succeeded by Mendel Jackson Davis
Political offices
Preceded by Carl Vinson; Georgia	Chairman of House Armed Services Committee; 1965–1970	Succeeded by Philip J. Philbin; Massachusetts
