= William Jennings Bryan Dorn =

American politician (1916–2005)

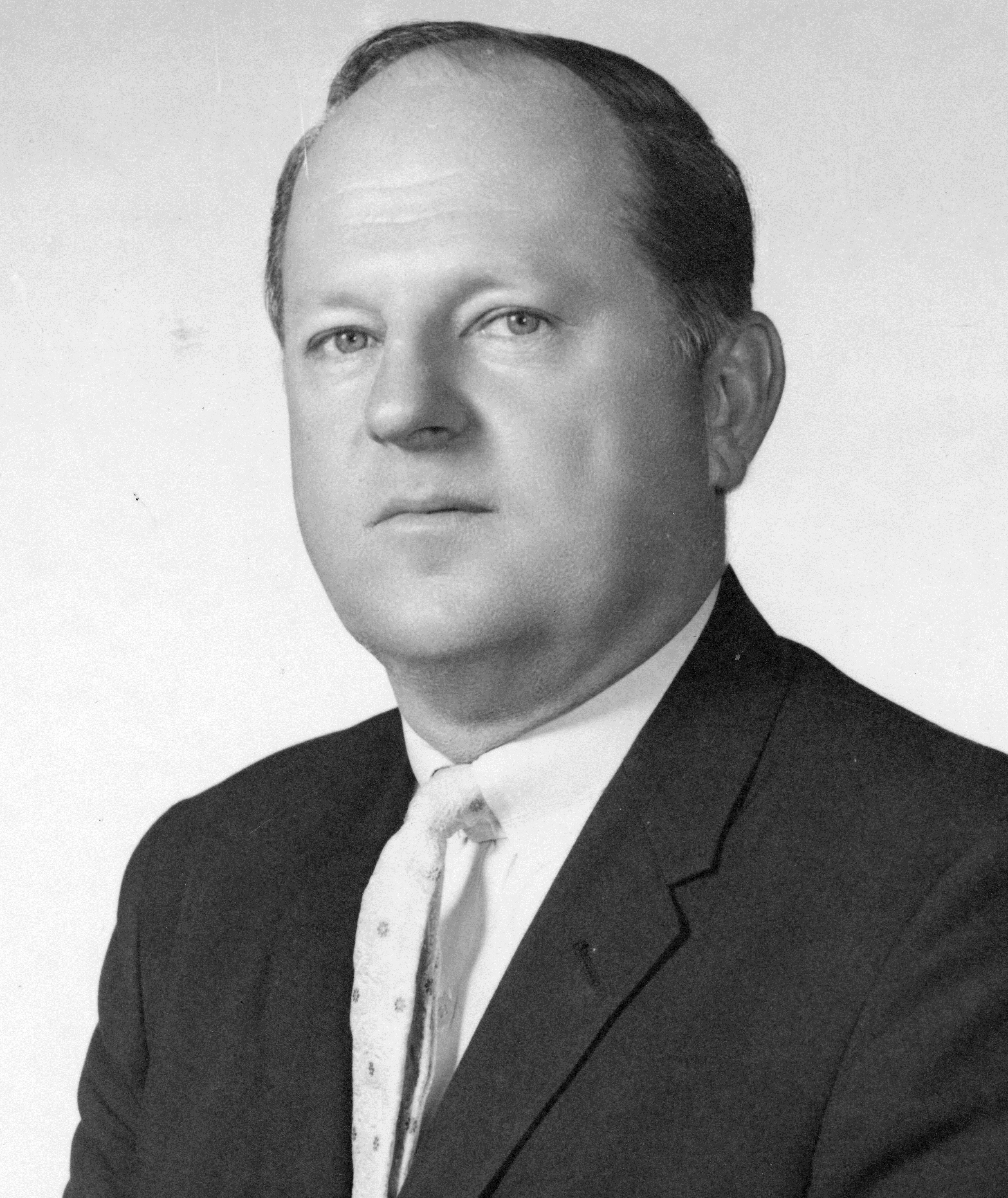

Chair of the House Veterans' Affairs Committee
- In office January 3, 1973 – December 31, 1974
- Speaker: Carl Albert
- Preceded by: Olin E. Teague
- Succeeded by: Ray Roberts

Member of the U.S. House of Representatives from South Carolina's 3rd district
- In office January 3, 1951 – December 31, 1974
- Preceded by: James Butler Hare
- Succeeded by: Butler Derrick
- In office January 3, 1947 – January 3, 1949
- Preceded by: Butler B. Hare
- Succeeded by: James Butler Hare

Member of the South Carolina Senate from Greenwood County
- In office January 14, 1941 – June 20, 1942

Member of the South Carolina House of Representatives from Greenwood County
- In office January 10, 1939 – June 8, 1940

Personal details
- Born: April 14, 1916 Greenwood County, South Carolina, U.S.
- Died: August 13, 2005 (aged 89) Greenwood, South Carolina, U.S.
- Party: Democratic
- Spouse: Mildred Johnson (m. 1948, d. 1990)

Military service
- Allegiance: United States of America
- Branch/service: United States Army Air Corps
- Years of service: 1942–1945
- Rank: Corporal
- Battles/wars: World War II; European Theater

William Jennings Bryan Dorn (April 14, 1916 – August 13, 2005) was an American politician. A member of the Democratic Party, he served as a U.S. representative from South Carolina's 3rd congressional district for a total of 26 years between 1947 and 1975.

== Early life ==
Dorn was born near Greenwood, South Carolina, on April 14, 1916, the son of Thomas Elbert and Pearl Griffith Dorn. Thomas Dorn was a school teacher, principal, and superintendent who hoped his son would have a political career, so he named the boy after William Jennings Bryan. Dorn attended the public schools of Greenwood and Greenwood High School, and became a farmer. He attended the University of South Carolina where he was a member of the Clariosophic Society. He was elected to the South Carolina House of Representatives in 1938 and to the South Carolina Senate in 1940. He served in the United States Army Air Forces in Europe during World War II.

Dorn wrote, "My original plan was to run for the South Carolina House at age twenty-two, the South Carolina Senate at twenty-four, and the United States Congress when I was twenty-six years old…. Then I planned to run for Governor at age thirty & the United States Senate before I was thirty-five. ... World War II & three and one-half years in the Army Air Corps changed by timetable, but not my ambitions." In 1984, he told a newspaper, "I never intended to stay in Congress for 26 years if I could avoid it."

== Congressional career ==
Dorn was first elected to Congress in 1946, defeating four-term incumbent Butler B. Hare in the primary. In 1948, he unsuccessfully challenged incumbent U.S. Senator Burnet R. Maybank for the Democratic nomination. Maybank won the nomination, and was unopposed in the general election.

Dorn returned to the House after the 1950 election, defeating the Democrat who had replaced him in 1948. He became known for his work on issues related to the military. He was a signatory to the 1956 Southern Manifesto that opposed the desegregation of public schools ordered by the Supreme Court in Brown v. Board of Education. Dorn voted against the Civil Rights Acts of 1957, the Civil Rights Acts of 1960, the Civil Rights Acts of 1964, and the Civil Rights Acts of 1968 as well as the 24th Amendment to the U.S. Constitution and the Voting Rights Act of 1965. On the other hand, Dorn opposed efforts to restrict the use of school busing in racial integration, and in 1983 he campaign for the election of African-American Harold Washington as mayor of Chicago.

Dorn served on the Veterans' Affairs Committee for twelve congresses. For nine congresses he was second in seniority behind chair Olin E. Teague. When Teague finally gave up running Veterans' Affairs for chair of the Science and Astronautics Committee, Dorn became chair for his final term but still labored under the continued presence of Teague on Veterans' Affairs. In his tenure in the House Dorn introduced 203 bills about veterans services, but only two were enacted. By contrast, Teague with the prerogatives of chairship, enacted 128 under his name.

In 1966, journalist Drew Pearson reported that Dorn was one of a group of congressmen who had received the "Statesman of the Republic" award from Liberty Lobby for his "right-wing activities". In his final term he was chairman of the House Veterans' Affairs Committee.

During his congressional career, Dorn opposed various liberal initiatives such as those related to the New Deal and the Great Society.

== Candidacy for governor ==
He left Congress to run for governor of South Carolina in 1974. He lost the Democratic primary to Charles 'Pug' Ravenel, who the South Carolina Supreme Court later ruled ineligible on residency grounds required by the state constitution. A special state convention then chose Dorn as the Democratic nominee. He was defeated in the general election by Republican James B. Edwards, one of the few disappointments in what was a successful year nationally for Democrats. In 1978, Dorn again sought the Democratic nomination for governor but was eliminated in a three-way race won by Richard Riley. In 1980, he was elected chairman of the South Carolina Democratic Party, and he served until 1984.

== After Congress ==
In 1978, President Jimmy Carter named the Veterans' Affairs hospital in Columbia, South Carolina, after Dorn. Dorn died in Greenwood on August 13, 2005. He was buried at Bethel Methodist Church Cemetery in Callison, Greenwood County, South Carolina.

== Autobiography ==
- Dorn, William Jennings Bryan, and Scott Derks. Dorn: Of the People, A Political Way of Life. Columbia and Orangeburg, S.C.: Bruccoli Clark Layman/Sandlapper Publishing, 1988

== Additional sources ==
- Roper, John Herbert. The Last Orator for the Millhands: William Jennings Bryan Dorn, 1916-2005. Mercer University Press, 2019.

Party political offices
Preceded by Charles D. Ravenel	Democratic nominee for Governor of South Carolina; 1974	Succeeded by Richard Riley
U.S. House of Representatives
Preceded by Butler B. Hare	Member of the U.S. House of Representatives from South Carolina's 3rd congressional district 1947–1949	Succeeded by James Butler Hare
Preceded by James Butler Hare	Member of the U.S. House of Representatives from South Carolina's 3rd congressional district 1951–1974	Succeeded by Butler Derrick
Honorary titles
Preceded by Edwin Arthur Hall	Most senior living U.S. representative (sitting or former); October 18, 2004 – August 13, 2005; Served alongside: George Smathers	Succeeded by George Smathers
