= John L. McMillan =

American politician

John Lanneau McMillan
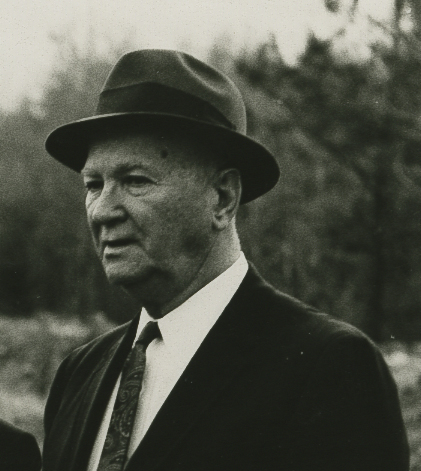

Member of the U.S. House of Representatives from South Carolina's 6th district
- In office January 3, 1939 – January 3, 1973
- Preceded by: Elizabeth H. Gasque
- Succeeded by: Edward Lunn Young

Personal details
- Born: April 12, 1898 Mullins, South Carolina, U.S.
- Died: September 3, 1979 (aged 81) Florence, South Carolina, U.S.
- Party: Democratic
- Education: University of North Carolina; University of South Carolina; National University School of Law
- Profession: Lawyer

John Lanneau "Johnny Mac" McMillan (April 12, 1898 – September 3, 1979) was a United States representative from South Carolina.

== Early life ==
Born on a farm near Mullins, he was educated at Mullins High School, the University of North Carolina, as well as the University of South Carolina Law School and National Law School in Washington, D.C.

== Political career ==
McMillan was elected as a Democrat to the Seventy-sixth and to the sixteen succeeding Congresses, serving from January 3, 1939 to January 3, 1973. He was chairman of the Committee on the District of Columbia from 1945 to 1947, from 1949 to 1953, and from 1955 to 1973. He was a signatory to the 1956 Southern Manifesto that opposed the desegregation of public schools ordered by the Supreme Court in Brown v. Board of Education.

He was selected to represent the United States Congress at the Interparliamentary Union in London in 1960, and in Tokyo in 1961.

As chairman of the US House Committee on the District of Columbia, McMillan was primarily responsible for overseeing local matters in the capital; under the Constitution, Congress has ultimate authority over the District. He consistently opposed home rule for the District, refusing to even bring up home rule bills for vote in his committee even when they had originally been passed out of the Senate. The lone home rule bill that even reached the House floor during his tenure came in 1965, when the House leadership steered a home rule bill away from McMillan at the urging of the Johnson administration. McMillan opposed the bill, arguing that Washington was "the only city created for a federal purpose." Although the bill ultimately didn't pass, the fact it was even brought to the floor at all was seen as a sea change.

However, McMillan was not completely opposed to giving D.C. residents greater control over their affairs. For example, in 1967, he sponsored a bill that gave the District an elected school board.

McMillan's tenure saw Washington become a majority-minority city, and blacks often claimed he was indifferent to their concerns. When Walter Washington, the Mayor-Commissioner of the District of Columbia, sent his first budget to Congress in late 1967, McMillan responded by having a truckload of watermelons delivered to Washington's office.

McMillan was defeated in the 1972 Democratic primary by a considerably more liberal Democrat, State Representative John Jenrette. McMillan blamed black voters, charging that "The colored people were bought out."

He is still the longest-serving congressman in South Carolina's history, and only Strom Thurmond and Ernest Hollings represented the state longer at the federal level.

== Personal life ==
He resided in Florence, South Carolina, where he died in 1979; interment was in the McMillan family cemetery, Mullins.

U.S. House of Representatives
| Preceded by Elizabeth H. Gasque | Member of the U.S. House of Representatives from South Carolina's 6th congressional district 1939–1973 | Succeeded by Edward Lunn Young |
