= 1922 United States House of Representatives elections in South Carolina =

The 1922 United States House of Representatives elections in South Carolina were held on November 7, 1922, to select seven Representatives for two-year terms from the state of South Carolina. Six incumbents were re-elected and the open seat in the 6th congressional district was retained by the Democrats. The composition of the state delegation thus remained solely Democratic.

== 1st congressional district ==
Incumbent Democratic Congressman W. Turner Logan of the 1st congressional district, in office since 1921, won the Democratic primary and defeated Republican challenger S.L. Bomgren in the general election.

=== Democratic primary ===
Democratic primary
Candidate	Votes	%
W. Turner Logan	10,437	54.7
I. Shep Hutto	7,363	38.6
James B. Morrison	1,291	6.7

=== General election results ===
South Carolina's 1st congressional district election results, 1922
Party	Candidate	Votes	%	±%
Democratic	W. Turner Logan (incumbent)	5,992	94.0	+1.4
Republican	S.L. Bomgren	383	6.0	−1.4
Majority		5,609	88.0	+2.8
Turnout		6,375		
Democratic hold				

== 2nd congressional district ==
Incumbent Democratic Congressman James F. Byrnes of the 2nd congressional district, in office since 1911, was unopposed in his bid for re-election.

=== General election results ===
South Carolina's 2nd congressional district election results, 1922
Party	Candidate	Votes	%	±%
Democratic	James F. Byrnes (incumbent)	4,163	100.0	0.0
Majority		4,163	100.0	0.0
Turnout		4,163		
Democratic hold				

== 3rd congressional district ==
Incumbent Democratic Congressman Frederick H. Dominick of the 3rd congressional district, in office since 1917, won the Democratic primary and was unopposed in the general election.

=== Democratic primary ===
Democratic primary
Candidate	Votes	%
Frederick H. Dominick	14,447	63.1
Sam H. Sherrard	4,762	20.8
E.P. McCravey	3,688	16.1

=== General election results ===
South Carolina's 3rd congressional district election results, 1922
Party	Candidate	Votes	%	±%
Democratic	Frederick H. Dominick (incumbent)	3,822	100.0	0.0
Majority		3,822	100.0	0.0
Turnout		3,822		
Democratic hold				

== 4th congressional district ==
Incumbent Democratic Congressman John J. McSwain of the 4th congressional district, in office since 1921, defeated Republican challenger M.P. Norwood.

=== General election results ===
South Carolina's 4th congressional district election results, 1922
Party	Candidate	Votes	%	±%
Democratic	John J. McSwain (incumbent)	8,346	97.3	−2.7
Republican	M.P. Norwood	228	2.7	+2.7
Majority		8,118	94.6	−5.4
Turnout		8,574		
Democratic hold				

== 5th congressional district ==
Incumbent Democratic Congressman William F. Stevenson of the 5th congressional district, in office since 1917, was unopposed in his bid for re-election.

=== General election results ===
South Carolina's 5th congressional district election results, 1922
Party	Candidate	Votes	%	±%
Democratic	William F. Stevenson (incumbent)	4,015	100.0	0.0
Majority		4,015	100.0	0.0
Turnout		4,015		
Democratic hold				

== 6th congressional district ==
Incumbent Democratic Congressman Philip H. Stoll of the 6th congressional district, in office since 1919, was defeated in the Democratic primary by Allard H. Gasque. He was unopposed in the general election.

=== Democratic primary ===
Democratic primary
Candidate	Votes	%
Philip H. Stoll	9,938	38.8
Allard H. Gasque	7,365	28.8
Jerome F. Pate	4,261	16.7
W.R. Barringer	4,014	15.7

Democratic primary runoff
Candidate	Votes	%	±%
Allard H. Gasque	14,572	52.3	+23.5
Philip H. Stoll	13,313	47.7	+8.9

=== General election results ===
South Carolina's 6th congressional district election results, 1922
Party	Candidate	Votes	%	±%
Democratic	Allard H. Gasque	3,642	100.0	0.0
Majority		3,642	100.0	0.0
Turnout		3,642		
Democratic hold				

== 7th congressional district ==
Incumbent Democratic Congressman Hampton P. Fulmer of the 7th congressional district, in office since 1921, won the Democratic primary and defeated Republican challenger J.C. Etheridge in the general election.

=== Democratic primary ===
Democratic primary
Candidate	Votes	%
Hampton P. Fulmer	12,572	62.5
Andrew J. Bethea	3,876	19.3
John J. McMahan	3,674	18.2

=== General election results ===
South Carolina's 7th congressional district election results, 1922
Party	Candidate	Votes	%	±%
Democratic	Hampton P. Fulmer (incumbent)	4,411	98.5	+6.6
Republican	J.C. Etheridge	68	1.5	−6.6
Majority		4,343	97.0	+13.2
Turnout		4,479		
Democratic hold				

== See also ==
- United States House of Representatives elections, 1922
- South Carolina gubernatorial election, 1922
- South Carolina's congressional districts
