= 1926 United States House of Representatives elections in South Carolina =

The 1926 United States House of Representatives elections in South Carolina were held on November 2, 1926, to select seven Representatives for two-year terms from the state of South Carolina. All seven incumbents were re-elected and the composition of the state delegation remained solely Democratic.

== 1st congressional district ==
Incumbent Democratic Congressman Thomas S. McMillan of the 1st congressional district, in office since 1925, defeated I. Shep Hutto in the Democratic primary and was unopposed in the general election.

=== Democratic primary ===
Democratic primary
Candidate	Votes	%
Thomas S. McMillan	9,644	58.2
I. Shep Hutto	6,917	41.8

=== General election results ===
South Carolina's 1st congressional district election results, 1926
Party	Candidate	Votes	%	±%
Democratic	Thomas S. McMillan (incumbent)	2,244	100.0	+4.6
Majority		2,244	100.0	+9.2
Turnout		2,244		
Democratic hold				

== 2nd congressional district ==
Incumbent Democratic Congressman Butler B. Hare of the 2nd congressional district, in office since 1925, was unopposed in his bid for re-election.

=== General election results ===
South Carolina's 2nd congressional district election results, 1926
Party	Candidate	Votes	%	±%
Democratic	Butler B. Hare (incumbent)	1,766	100.0	0.0
Majority		1,766	100.0	0.0
Turnout		1,766		
Democratic hold				

== 3rd congressional district ==
Incumbent Democratic Congressman Frederick H. Dominick of the 3rd congressional district, in office since 1917, was unopposed in his bid for re-election.

=== General election results ===
South Carolina's 3rd congressional district election results, 1926
Party	Candidate	Votes	%	±%
Democratic	Frederick H. Dominick (incumbent)	2,372	100.0	0.0
Majority		2,372	100.0	0.0
Turnout		2,372		
Democratic hold				

== 4th congressional district ==
Incumbent Democratic Congressman John J. McSwain of the 4th congressional district, in office since 1921, was unopposed in his bid for re-election.

=== General election results ===
South Carolina's 4th congressional district election results, 1926
Party	Candidate	Votes	%	±%
Democratic	John J. McSwain (incumbent)	2,057	100.0	0.0
Majority		2,057	100.0	0.0
Turnout		2,057		
Democratic hold				

== 5th congressional district ==
Incumbent Democratic Congressman William F. Stevenson of the 5th congressional district, in office since 1917, defeated Zeb V. Davidson in the Democratic primary and was unopposed in the general election.

=== Democratic primary ===
Democratic primary
Candidate	Votes	%
William F. Stevenson	18,672	68.6
Zeb V. Davidson	8,554	31.4

=== General election results ===
South Carolina's 5th congressional district election results, 1926
Party	Candidate	Votes	%	±%
Democratic	William F. Stevenson (incumbent)	2,416	100.0	0.0
Majority		2,416	100.0	0.0
Turnout		2,416		
Democratic hold				

== 6th congressional district ==
Incumbent Democratic Congressman Allard H. Gasque of the 6th congressional district, in office since 1923, was unopposed in his bid for re-election.

=== General election results ===
South Carolina's 6th congressional district election results, 1926
Party	Candidate	Votes	%	±%
Democratic	Allard H. Gasque (incumbent)	1,532	100.0	0.0
Majority		1,532	100.0	0.0
Turnout		1,532		
Democratic hold				

== 7th congressional district ==
Incumbent Democratic Congressman Hampton P. Fulmer of the 7th congressional district, in office since 1921, won the Democratic primary and was unopposed in the general election.

=== Democratic primary ===
Democratic primary
Candidate	Votes	%
Hampton P. Fulmer	12,501	48.8
Ernest M. Dupre	11,473	44.8
D.R. Sturkie	1,632	6.4

Democratic primary runoff
Candidate	Votes	%	±%
Hampton P. Fulmer	13,260	52.1	+3.3
Ernest M. Dupre	12,192	47.9	+3.1

=== General election results ===
South Carolina's 7th congressional district election results, 1926
Party	Candidate	Votes	%	±%
Democratic	Hampton P. Fulmer (incumbent)	1,933	100.0	0.0
Majority		1,933	100.0	0.0
Turnout		1,933		
Democratic hold				

== See also ==
- 1926 United States House of Representatives elections
- 1926 South Carolina gubernatorial election
- South Carolina's congressional districts
