= 1930 United States House of Representatives elections in South Carolina =

The 1930 United States House of Representatives elections in South Carolina were held on November 4, 1930, to select seven Representatives for two-year terms from the state of South Carolina. All seven incumbents were re-elected and the composition of the state delegation remained solely Democratic.

== 1st congressional district ==
Incumbent Democratic Congressman Thomas S. McMillan of the 1st congressional district, in office since 1925, was unopposed in his bid for re-election.

=== General election results ===
South Carolina's 1st congressional district election results, 1930
| Party | Candidate | Votes | % | ±% |
|---|---|---|---|---|
| Democratic | Thomas S. McMillan (incumbent) | 2,536 | 100.0 | 0.0 |
| Majority | | 2,536 | 100.0 | 0.0 |
| Turnout | | 2,536 | | |
| Democratic hold | | | | |

== 2nd congressional district ==
Incumbent Democratic Congressman Butler B. Hare of the 2nd congressional district, in office since 1925, won the Democratic primary and was unopposed in the general election.

=== Democratic primary ===
Democratic primary
| Candidate | Votes | % |
|---|---|---|
| Butler B. Hare | 12,252 | 52.7 |
| John F. Williams | 7,902 | 34.0 |
| Claude Aman | 3,089 | 13.3 |

=== General election results ===
South Carolina's 2nd congressional district election results, 1930
| Party | Candidate | Votes | % | ±% |
|---|---|---|---|---|
| Democratic | Butler B. Hare (incumbent) | 2,149 | 100.0 | 0.0 |
| Majority | | 2,149 | 100.0 | 0.0 |
| Turnout | | 2,149 | | |
| Democratic hold | | | | |

== 3rd congressional district ==
Incumbent Democratic Congressman Frederick H. Dominick of the 3rd congressional district, in office since 1917, was unopposed in his bid for re-election.

=== General election results ===
South Carolina's 3rd congressional district election results, 1930
| Party | Candidate | Votes | % | ±% |
|---|---|---|---|---|
| Democratic | Frederick H. Dominick (incumbent) | 2,221 | 100.0 | 0.0 |
| Majority | | 2,221 | 100.0 | 0.0 |
| Turnout | | 2,221 | | |
| Democratic hold | | | | |

== 4th congressional district ==
Incumbent Democratic Congressman John J. McSwain of the 4th congressional district, in office since 1921, was unopposed in his bid for re-election.

=== General election results ===
South Carolina's 4th congressional district election results, 1930
| Party | Candidate | Votes | % | ±% |
|---|---|---|---|---|
| Democratic | John J. McSwain (incumbent) | 3,685 | 100.0 | 0.0 |
| Majority | | 3,685 | 100.0 | 0.0 |
| Turnout | | 3,685 | | |
| Democratic hold | | | | |

== 5th congressional district ==
Incumbent Democratic Congressman William F. Stevenson of the 5th congressional district, in office since 1917, defeated Zeb V. Davidson in the Democratic primary for the third straight time and was unopposed in the general election.

=== Democratic primary ===
Democratic primary
| Candidate | Votes | % |
|---|---|---|
| William F. Stevenson | 22,485 | 62.6 |
| Zeb V. Davidson | 13,430 | 37.4 |

=== General election results ===
South Carolina's 5th congressional district election results, 1930
| Party | Candidate | Votes | % | ±% |
|---|---|---|---|---|
| Democratic | William F. Stevenson (incumbent) | 2,319 | 100.0 | 0.0 |
| Majority | | 2,319 | 100.0 | 0.0 |
| Turnout | | 2,319 | | |
| Democratic hold | | | | |

== 6th congressional district ==
Incumbent Democratic Congressman Allard H. Gasque of the 6th congressional district, in office since 1923, was unopposed in his bid for re-election.

=== General election results ===
South Carolina's 6th congressional district election results, 1930
| Party | Candidate | Votes | % | ±% |
|---|---|---|---|---|
| Democratic | Allard H. Gasque (incumbent) | 1,881 | 100.0 | 0.0 |
| Majority | | 1,881 | 100.0 | 0.0 |
| Turnout | | 1,881 | | |
| Democratic hold | | | | |

== 7th congressional district ==
Incumbent Democratic Congressman Hampton P. Fulmer of the 7th congressional district, in office since 1921, defeated D. R. Sturkie in the Democratic primary and was unopposed in the general election.

=== Democratic primary ===
Democratic primary
| Candidate | Votes | % |
|---|---|---|
| Hampton P. Fulmer | 26,397 | 78.2 |
| D. R. Sturkie | 7,362 | 21.8 |

=== General election results ===
South Carolina's 7th congressional district election results, 1930
| Party | Candidate | Votes | % | ±% |
|---|---|---|---|---|
| Democratic | Hampton P. Fulmer (incumbent) | 1,372 | 100.0 | 0.0 |
| Majority | | 1,372 | 100.0 | 0.0 |
| Turnout | | 1,372 | | |
| Democratic hold | | | | |

== See also ==
- 1930 United States House of Representatives elections
- 1930 South Carolina gubernatorial election
- South Carolina's congressional districts
