= 1928 United States House of Representatives elections in South Carolina =

The 1928 United States House of Representatives elections in South Carolina were held on November 6, 1928, to select seven Representatives for two-year terms from the state of South Carolina. All seven incumbents were re-elected and the composition of the state delegation remained solely Democratic.

== 1st congressional district ==
Incumbent Democratic Congressman Thomas S. McMillan of the 1st congressional district, in office since 1925, won the Democratic primary and was unopposed in the general election.

=== Democratic primary ===
Democratic primary
Candidate	Votes	%
Thomas S. McMillan	8,379	63.8
I. Shep Hutto	3,756	28.6
James DeTreville	567	4.3
Patrick H. Kennedy	427	3.3

=== General election results ===
South Carolina's 1st congressional district election results, 1928
Party	Candidate	Votes	%	±%
Democratic	Thomas S. McMillan (incumbent)	8,469	100.0	0.0
Majority		8,469	100.0	0.0
Turnout		8,469		
Democratic hold				

== 2nd congressional district ==
Incumbent Democratic Congressman Butler B. Hare of the 2nd congressional district, in office since 1925, was unopposed in his bid for re-election.

=== General election results ===
South Carolina's 2nd congressional district election results, 1928
Party	Candidate	Votes	%	±%
Democratic	Butler B. Hare (incumbent)	7,648	100.0	0.0
Majority		7,648	100.0	0.0
Turnout		7,648		
Democratic hold				

== 3rd congressional district ==
Incumbent Democratic Congressman Frederick H. Dominick of the 3rd congressional district, in office since 1917, was unopposed in his bid for re-election.

=== General election results ===
South Carolina's 3rd congressional district election results, 1928
Party	Candidate	Votes	%	±%
Democratic	Frederick H. Dominick (incumbent)	10,917	100.0	0.0
Majority		10,917	100.0	0.0
Turnout		10,917		
Democratic hold				

== 4th congressional district ==
Incumbent Democratic Congressman John J. McSwain of the 4th congressional district, in office since 1921, was unopposed in his bid for re-election.

=== General election results ===
South Carolina's 4th congressional district election results, 1928
Party	Candidate	Votes	%	±%
Democratic	John J. McSwain (incumbent)	8,873	100.0	0.0
Majority		8,873	100.0	0.0
Turnout		8,873		
Democratic hold				

== 5th congressional district ==
Incumbent Democratic Congressman William F. Stevenson of the 5th congressional district, in office since 1917, defeated Zeb V. Davidson in the Democratic primary and was unopposed in the general election.

=== Democratic primary ===
Democratic primary
Candidate	Votes	%
William F. Stevenson	13,810	60.5
Zeb V. Davidson	9,023	39.5

=== General election results ===
South Carolina's 5th congressional district election results, 1928
Party	Candidate	Votes	%	±%
Democratic	William F. Stevenson (incumbent)	8,911	100.0	0.0
Majority		8,911	100.0	0.0
Turnout		8,911		
Democratic hold				

== 6th congressional district ==
Incumbent Democratic Congressman Allard H. Gasque of the 6th congressional district, in office since 1923, won the Democratic primary and was unopposed in his bid for re-election.

=== Democratic primary ===
Democratic primary
Candidate	Votes	%
Allard H. Gasque	14,780	71.0
Earl Ellerbe	3,259	15.6
Joel I. Allen	2,793	13.4

=== General election results ===
South Carolina's 6th congressional district election results, 1928
Party	Candidate	Votes	%	±%
Democratic	Allard H. Gasque (incumbent)	7,757	100.0	0.0
Majority		7,757	100.0	0.0
Turnout		7,757		
Democratic hold				

== 7th congressional district ==
Incumbent Democratic Congressman Hampton P. Fulmer of the 7th congressional district, in office since 1921, defeated Ernest M. Dupre in the Democratic primary and was unopposed in the general election.

=== Democratic primary ===
Democratic primary
Candidate	Votes	%
Hampton P. Fulmer	14,956	67.4
Ernest M. Dupre	7,241	32.6

=== General election results ===
South Carolina's 7th congressional district election results, 1928
Party	Candidate	Votes	%	±%
Democratic	Hampton P. Fulmer (incumbent)	8,772	100.0	0.0
Majority		8,772	100.0	0.0
Turnout		8,772		
Democratic hold				

== See also ==
- 1928 United States House of Representatives elections
- South Carolina's congressional districts
