= 1934 United States House of Representatives elections in South Carolina =

The 1934 United States House of Representatives elections in South Carolina were held on November 6, 1934, to select six Representatives for two-year terms from the state of South Carolina. All six incumbents were re-elected and the composition of the state delegation remained solely Democratic.

== 1st congressional district ==
Incumbent Democratic Congressman Thomas S. McMillan of the 1st congressional district, in office since 1925, defeated Republican challenger George W. Beckett.

=== General election results ===
South Carolina's 1st congressional district election results, 1934
Party	Candidate	Votes	%	±%
Democratic	Thomas S. McMillan (incumbent)	4,264	97.7	+1.8
Republican	George W. Beckett	99	2.3	−1.8
Majority		4,165	95.4	+3.6
Turnout		4,363		
Democratic hold				

== 2nd congressional district ==
Incumbent Democratic Congressman Hampton P. Fulmer of the 2nd congressional district, in office since 1921, won the Democratic primary and defeated Republican D.A. Gardner in the general election.

=== Democratic primary ===
Democratic primary
Candidate	Votes	%
Hampton P. Fulmer	28,374	52.7
Gary Paschal	20,819	38.7
D.R. Sturkie	4,657	8.6

=== General election results ===
South Carolina's 2nd congressional district election results, 1934
Party	Candidate	Votes	%	±%
Democratic	Hampton P. Fulmer (incumbent)	3,518	99.2	+1.3
Republican	D.A. Gardner	29	0.8	−1.3
Majority		3,489	98.4	+2.6
Turnout		3,547		
Democratic hold				

== 3rd congressional district ==
Incumbent Democratic Congressman John C. Taylor of the 3rd congressional district, in office since 1933, defeated Leon W. Harris in the Democratic primary and Republican T. Frank McCord in the general election.

=== Democratic primary ===
Democratic primary
Candidate	Votes	%
John C. Taylor	33,739	63.1
Leon W. Harris	19,711	36.9

=== General election results ===
South Carolina's 3rd congressional district election results, 1934
Party	Candidate	Votes	%	±%
Democratic	John C. Taylor (incumbent)	3,830	99.4	+0.2
Republican	T. Frank McCord	25	0.6	−0.2
Majority		3,805	98.8	+0.4
Turnout		3,855		
Democratic hold				

== 4th congressional district ==
Incumbent Democratic Congressman John J. McSwain of the 4th congressional district, in office since 1921, won the Democratic primary and defeated Republican Frank W. Faux in the general election.

=== Democratic primary ===
Democratic primary
Candidate	Votes	%
John J. McSwain	31,919	55.6
Miller C. Foster	19,773	34.5
James H. Sullivan	5,701	9.9

=== General election results ===
South Carolina's 4th congressional district election results, 1934
Party	Candidate	Votes	%	±%
Democratic	John J. McSwain (incumbent)	4,681	99.4	+1.0
Republican	Frank W. Faux	27	0.6	−1.0
Majority		4,654	98.8	+2.0
Turnout		4,708		
Democratic hold				

== 5th congressional district ==
Incumbent Democratic Congressman James P. Richards of the 5th congressional district, in office since 1933, won the Democratic primary and defeated Republican C.F. Pendleton in the general election.

=== Democratic primary ===
Democratic primary
Candidate	Votes	%
James P. Richards	32,613	76.5
J.E. Beamguard	6,246	14.7
A.L. Wood	3,780	8.8

=== General election results ===
South Carolina's 5th congressional district election results, 1934
Party	Candidate	Votes	%	±%
Democratic	James P. Richards (incumbent)	2,645	98.7	+0.2
Republican	C.F. Pendleton	35	1.3	−0.2
Majority		2,610	97.4	+0.4
Turnout		2,680		
Democratic hold				

== 6th congressional district ==
Incumbent Democratic Congressman Allard H. Gasque of the 6th congressional district, in office since 1923, won the Democratic primary and defeated Republican T.J. Karnes in the general election.

=== Democratic primary ===
Democratic primary
Candidate	Votes	%
Allard H. Gasque	27,962	59.7
E.S.C. Baker	11,395	24.3
Emerson Ard	7,474	16.0

=== General election results ===
South Carolina's 6th congressional district election results, 1934
Party	Candidate	Votes	%	±%
Democratic	Allard H. Gasque (incumbent)	2,983	99.3	+0.7
Republican	T.J. Karnes	20	0.7	−0.7
Majority		2,963	98.6	+1.4
Turnout		3,003		
Democratic hold				

== See also ==
- United States House of Representatives elections, 1934
- South Carolina gubernatorial election, 1934
- South Carolina's congressional districts
