= 1918 United States House of Representatives elections in South Carolina =

The 1918 United States House of Representatives elections in South Carolina were held on November 5, 1918, to select seven Representatives for two-year terms from the state of South Carolina. The primary elections were held on August 27 and the runoff elections were held two weeks later on September 10. All seven incumbents were re-elected and the composition of the state delegation remained solely Democratic.

== 1st congressional district ==
Incumbent Democratic Congressman Richard S. Whaley of the 1st congressional district, in office since 1913, was unopposed in his bid for re-election.

=== General election results ===
South Carolina's 1st congressional district election results, 1918
Party	Candidate	Votes	%	±%
Democratic	Richard S. Whaley (incumbent)	2,328	100.0	+4.6
Majority		2,328	100.0	+9.2
Turnout		2,328		
Democratic hold				

== 2nd congressional district ==
Incumbent Democratic Congressman James F. Byrnes of the 2nd congressional district, in office since 1911, won the Democratic primary and was unopposed in the general election.

=== Democratic primary ===
Democratic primary
Candidate	Votes	%
James F. Byrnes	7,266	56.9
Gasper L. Toole	3,212	25.1
Theodore G. Croft	1,330	10.4
N.G. Evans	974	7.6

=== General election results ===
South Carolina's 2nd congressional district election results, 1918
Party	Candidate	Votes	%	±%
Democratic	James F. Byrnes (incumbent)	3,155	100.0	+1.5
Majority		3,155	100.0	+3.0
Turnout		3,155		
Democratic hold				

== 3rd congressional district ==
Incumbent Democratic Congressman Frederick H. Dominick of the 3rd congressional district, in office since 1917, defeated Wyatt Aiken in the Democratic primary and was unopposed in the general election.

=== Democratic primary ===
Democratic primary
Candidate	Votes	%
Frederick H. Dominick	9,596	51.1
Wyatt Aiken	9,166	48.9

=== General election results ===
South Carolina's 3rd congressional district election results, 1918
Party	Candidate	Votes	%	±%
Democratic	Frederick H. Dominick (incumbent)	3,701	100.0	0.0
Majority		3,701	100.0	0.0
Turnout		3,701		
Democratic hold				

== 4th congressional district ==
Incumbent Democratic Congressman Samuel J. Nicholls of the 4th congressional district, in office since 1915, won the Democratic primary and was unopposed in the general election.

=== Democratic primary ===
Democratic primary
Candidate	Votes	%
Samuel J. Nicholls	9,651	46.4
Horace L. Bomar	5,743	27.6
D.B. Traxler	5,396	26.0

Democratic primary runoff
Candidate	Votes	%	±%
Samuel J. Nicholls	9,376	51.1	+4.7
Horace L. Bomar	8,970	48.9	+21.3

=== General election results ===
South Carolina's 4th congressional district election results, 1918
Party	Candidate	Votes	%	±%
Democratic	Samuel J. Nicholls (incumbent)	4,069	100.0	+0.6
Majority		4,069	100.0	+1.2
Turnout		4,069		
Democratic hold				

== 5th congressional district ==
Incumbent Democratic Congressman William F. Stevenson of the 5th congressional district, in office since 1917, was unopposed in his bid for re-election.

=== General election results ===
South Carolina's 5th congressional district election results, 1918
Party	Candidate	Votes	%	±%
Democratic	William F. Stevenson (incumbent)	3,640	100.0	0.0
Majority		3,640	100.0	0.0
Turnout		3,640		
Democratic hold				

== 6th congressional district ==
Incumbent Democratic Congressman J. Willard Ragsdale of the 6th congressional district, in office since 1913, was unopposed in his bid for re-election.

=== General election results ===
South Carolina's 6th congressional district election results, 1918
Party	Candidate	Votes	%	±%
Democratic	J. Willard Ragsdale (incumbent)	3,626	100.0	+0.9
Majority		3,626	100.0	+1.8
Turnout		3,626		
Democratic hold				

== 7th congressional district ==
Incumbent Democratic Congressman Asbury Francis Lever of the 7th congressional district, in office since 1901, won the Democratic primary and defeated Republican R.H. Richardson in the general election.

=== Democratic primary ===
Democratic primary
Candidate	Votes	%
Asbury Francis Lever	9,770	59.8
George Bell Timmerman	3,502	21.4
Thomas Gordon McLeod	2,127	13.0
Thomas F. Brantley	942	5.8

=== General election results ===
South Carolina's 7th congressional district election results, 1918
Party	Candidate	Votes	%	±%
Democratic	Asbury F. Lever (incumbent)	4,761	96.4	+2.9
Republican	R.H. Richardson	176	3.6	−2.9
Majority		4,585	92.8	+5.8
Turnout		4,937		
Democratic hold				

== See also ==
- United States House of Representatives elections, 1918
- South Carolina gubernatorial election, 1918
- South Carolina's congressional district s
