= 1888 United States House of Representatives elections in South Carolina =

The 1888 United States House of Representatives elections in South Carolina were held on November 6, 1888, to select seven Representatives for two-year terms from the state of South Carolina. All seven incumbents were initially reported as re-elected, and the composition of the state delegation remained solely Democratic, however Thomas E. Miller successfully contested the result in the 7th congressional district, claiming voter suppression of black Republican votes.

== 1st congressional district ==
Incumbent Democratic Congressman Samuel Dibble of the 1st congressional district, in office since 1883, defeated Republican challenger S.W. McKinlay.

=== General election results ===
South Carolina's 1st congressional district election results, 1888
Party	Candidate	Votes	%	±%
Democratic	Samuel Dibble (incumbent)	8,540	86.7	−13.2
Republican	S.W. McKinlay	1,296	13.1	+13.1
No party	Write-Ins	19	0.2	+0.1
Majority		7,244	73.6	−26.2
Turnout		9,855		
Democratic hold				

== 2nd congressional district ==
Incumbent Democratic Congressman George D. Tillman of the 2nd congressional district, in office since 1883, defeated Republican challenger Seymour E. Smith.

=== General election results ===
South Carolina's 2nd congressional district election results, 1888
Party	Candidate	Votes	%	±%
Democratic	George D. Tillman (incumbent)	10,704	86.8	−12.8
Republican	Seymour E. Smith	1,405	11.4	+11.4
No party	Write-Ins	228	1.8	+1.4
Majority		9,299	75.4	−23.8
Turnout		12,337		
Democratic hold				

== 3rd congressional district ==
Incumbent Democratic Congressman James S. Cothran of the 3rd congressional district, in office since 1887, was unopposed in his bid for re-election.

=== General election results ===
South Carolina's 3rd congressional district election results, 1888
Party	Candidate	Votes	%	±%
Democratic	James S. Cothran (incumbent)	8,758	99.8	0.0
No party	Write-Ins	16	0.2	0.0
Majority		8,742	99.6	0.0
Turnout		8,774		
Democratic hold				

== 4th congressional district ==
Incumbent Democratic Congressman William H. Perry of the 4th congressional district, in office since 1885, defeated D.R. Duncan in the Democratic primary was unopposed in the general election.

=== General election results ===
South Carolina's 4th congressional district election results, 1888
Party	Candidate	Votes	%	±%
Democratic	William H. Perry (incumbent)	11,410	99.9	−0.1
No party	Write-Ins	6	0.1	+0.1
Majority		11,404	99.8	−0.2
Turnout		11,416		
Democratic hold				

== 5th congressional district ==
Incumbent Democratic Congressman John J. Hemphill of the 5th congressional district, in office since 1883, was unopposed in his bid for re-election.

=== General election results ===
South Carolina's 5th congressional district election results, 1888
Party	Candidate	Votes	%	±%
Democratic	John J. Hemphill (incumbent)	9,559	99.7	−0.2
No party	Write-Ins	27	0.3	+0.2
Majority		9,532	99.4	−0.5
Turnout		9,586		
Democratic hold				

== 6th congressional district ==
Incumbent Democratic Congressman George W. Dargan of the 6th congressional district, in office since 1883, was unopposed in his bid for re-election.

=== General election results ===
South Carolina's 6th congressional district election results, 1888
Party	Candidate	Votes	%	±%
Democratic	George W. Dargan (incumbent)	8,586	95.7	−3.0
No party	Write-Ins	386	4.3	+3.0
Majority		8,200	91.4	−6.0
Turnout		8,972		
Democratic hold				

== 7th congressional district ==
Incumbent Democratic Congressman William Elliott of the 7th congressional district, in office since 1887, defeated Republican challenger Thomas E. Miller. However, Miller successfully contested the election in the Republican controlled House of Representatives and replaced Elliott in September 1890.

=== General election results ===
South Carolina's 7th congressional district election results, 1888
Party	Candidate	Votes	%	±%
Democratic	William Elliott (incumbent)	8,358	54.1	+2.1
Republican	Thomas E. Miller	7,003	45.4	−2.4
No party	Write-Ins	74	0.5	+0.3
Majority		1,355	8.7	+4.5
Turnout		15,435		
Democratic hold				

== See also ==
- United States House of Representatives elections, 1888
- South Carolina gubernatorial election, 1888
- South Carolina's congressional districts
