= South Carolina's 7th congressional district =

U.S. House district for South Carolina

Coordinates: 34.05°N 79.50°W

- Interactive map of district boundaries since January 3, 2023
- Representative: Russell Fry; R–Murrells Inlet
- Population (2025): 812,175
- Median household income: $64,933
- Ethnicity: 63.9% White; 25.8% Black; 5.0% Hispanic; 3.5% Two or more races; 1.1% Asian; 0.9% other
- Cook PVI: R+12

South Carolina's 7th congressional district is a congressional district for the United States House of Representatives in South Carolina, established in 2011 following apportionment of another seat to the state in the redistricting cycle following the 2010 census. It is located in the Pee Dee region, and includes all of Chesterfield, Darlington, Dillon, Georgetown, Horry, Marion, and Marlboro Counties and most of Florence County. The district is represented by Republican Russell Fry who was elected in 2022 and took office on January 3, 2023.

== History ==
The 7th congressional district of South Carolina existed in the 19th century, but was eliminated in 1853 as a result of the 1850 census. After the 1880 census, Congress apportioned the state another seat, and the state legislature re-established the district.

By that time, the Reconstruction era had ended and the state legislature was controlled by Democrats, who wrested control by a mixture of violence and fraud. They defined the boundaries of the 7th district, which was called the "shoestring district" because of its long, narrow shape that included many black precincts. In 1892 and 1894 the majority-black voters of the district elected George W. Murray to Congress; he was the only African American to serve in Congress in those sessions and, following disfranchisement and demographic changes, the last elected from the state until Jim Clyburn in 1992.

In 1895, the Democrat-dominated state legislature passed a new constitution, disfranchising black voters by changes to voter registration and electoral rules that were applied against them in a discriminatory way. For decades after 1896, only white Democrats were elected to Congress from the state. (Such disfranchisement occurred among all the states of the former Confederacy, and their use of poll taxes, literacy tests, grandfather clauses, and white primaries survived several US Supreme Court challenges.)

During the first half of the 20th century, 6.5 million blacks in total left South Carolina and other southern states in the Great Migration to the North, Midwest and West. Following cumulative declines in state population, after the 1930 census, South Carolina lost a seat and the 7th district was eliminated in redistricting. It was last represented by Democrat Hampton P. Fulmer, who was redistricted into the 2nd district.

South Carolina had only six districts for the next 80 years. African Americans were effectively barred from voting until after passage of the Voting Rights Act of 1965. Increases in population led to the state's receiving another congressional seat in the redistricting cycle following the 2010 census.

The 7th district is located in the rapidly developing area of northeastern South Carolina, including the Myrtle Beach metropolitan area (the Grand Strand) and the Pee Dee region. It is a white-majority district and its voters elected Republican Tom Rice as US Representative from the district in 2012; he took office in January 2013, when the 113th Congress convened. Due almost entirely to the presence of heavily Republican Horry County, which has as many people as the rest of the district combined, it tilts Republican.

The district boundaries are roughly similar to the configuration of the 6th congressional district before it was reconfigured after the 1990 census as a black-majority district.

== Composition ==
For the 118th and successive Congresses (based on redistricting following the 2020 census), the district contains all or portions of the following counties and communities:

Chesterfield County (9)

All 9 communities

Darlington County (8)

All 8 communities

Dillon County (6)

All 6 communities

Florence County (9)

Coward, Danwood, Florence, Johnsonville, Olanta, Pamplico, Scranton (part; also 6th), Timmonsville, Quinby

Georgetown County (7)

All 7 communities

Horry County (20)

All 20 communities

Marion County (8)

All 8 communities

Marlboro County (7)

All 7 communities

== Recent election results from statewide races ==
Year	Office	Results
2008	President	McCain 53% - 45%
2012	President	Romney 55% - 45%
2016	President	Trump 58% - 39%
2016	Senate	Scott 61% - 37%
2018	Governor	McMaster 57% - 43%
2018	Secretary of State	Hammond 59% - 41%
2018	Treasurer	Loftis 58% - 40%
2018	Attorney General	Wilson 58% - 41%
2020	President	Trump 59% - 40%
2020	Senate	Graham 58% - 41%
2022	Senate	Scott 67% - 33%
2022	Governor	McMaster 63% - 36%
2022	Secretary of State	Hammond 67% - 33%
2024	President	Trump 63% - 36%
2026	Senate	Graham 53% - 45%
2026	Governor	Wilson 57% - 41%

== List of members representing the district ==
Member (Residence)	Party	Years	Cong ress	Electoral history	District location
District established March 4, 1803
Thomas Moore (Prices Store)	Democratic-Republican	March 4, 1803 – March 3, 1813	8th 9th 10th 11th 12th	Redistricted from the 6th district and re-elected in 1803. Re-elected in 1804. Re-elected in 1806. Re-elected in 1808. Re-elected in 1810. Retired.	1803–1813 "Chester district"
Elias Earle (Centerville)	Democratic-Republican	March 4, 1813 – March 3, 1815	13th	Redistricted from the 8th district and re-elected in 1812. Lost re-election.	1813–1823 "Pendleton district"
John Taylor (Pendleton)	Democratic-Republican	March 4, 1815 – March 3, 1817	14th	Elected in 1814. Lost re-election.	1813–1823 "Pendleton district"
Elias Earle (Centerville)	Democratic-Republican	March 4, 1817 – March 3, 1821	15th 16th	Elected in 1816. Re-elected in 1818. Retired.	1813–1823 "Pendleton district"
John Wilson (Golden Grove)	Democratic-Republican	March 4, 1821 – March 3, 1823	17th	Elected in 1820. Redistricted to the 6th district.	1813–1823 "Pendleton district"
Joseph Gist (Pinckneyville)	Jackson; Republican	March 4, 1823 – March 3, 1825	18th 19th	Redistricted from the 8th district and re-elected in 1823. Re-elected in 1824. Retired.	1823–1833 "Chester district"
Joseph Gist (Pinckneyville)	Jacksonian	March 4, 1825 – March 3, 1827	18th 19th	Redistricted from the 8th district and re-elected in 1823. Re-elected in 1824. Retired.	1823–1833 "Chester district"
William T. Nuckolls (Hancockville)	Jacksonian	March 4, 1827 – March 3, 1833	20th 21st 22nd	Elected in 1826. Re-elected in 1828. Re-elected in 1830. Retired.	1823–1833 "Chester district"
William K. Clowney (Union)	Nullifier	March 4, 1833 – March 3, 1835	23rd	Elected in 1833. Lost re-election.	1833–1843 [data missing]
James Rogers (Yorkville)	Jacksonian	March 4, 1835 – March 3, 1837	24th	Elected in 1834. Lost re-election.	1833–1843 [data missing]
William K. Clowney (Union)	Nullifier	March 4, 1837 – March 3, 1839	25th	Elected in 1836. Retired.	1833–1843 [data missing]
James Rogers (Maybinton)	Democratic	March 4, 1839 – March 3, 1843	26th 27th	Elected in 1838. Re-elected in 1840. Retired.	1833–1843 [data missing]
Robert B. Rhett (Ashepoo)	Democratic	March 4, 1843 – March 3, 1849	28th 29th 30th	Redistricted from the 2nd district and re-elected in 1843. Re-elected in 1844. Re-elected in 1846. Retired.	1843–1853 [data missing]
William F. Colcock (Grahamville)	Democratic	March 4, 1849 – March 3, 1853	31st 32nd	Elected in 1848. Re-elected in 1850. Retired.	1843–1853 [data missing]
District dissolved March 3, 1853
District re-established March 4, 1883
Edmund W. M. Mackey (Berkeley)	Republican	March 4, 1883 – January 27, 1884	48th	Redistricted from the 2nd district and re-elected in 1882. Died.	1883–1893 [data missing]
Vacant		January 27, 1884 – March 18, 1884	48th		1883–1893 [data missing]
Robert Smalls (Beaufort)	Republican	March 18, 1884 – March 3, 1887	48th 49th	Elected to finish Mackey's term. Re-elected in 1884. Lost re-election.	1883–1893 [data missing]
William Elliott (Beaufort)	Democratic	March 4, 1887 – September 23, 1890	50th 51st	Elected in 1886. Re-elected in 1888. Lost election contest.	1883–1893 [data missing]
Thomas E. Miller (Beaufort)	Republican	September 24, 1890 – March 3, 1891	51st	Won election contest. Lost re-election.	1883–1893 [data missing]
William Elliott (Beaufort)	Democratic	March 4, 1891 – March 3, 1893	52nd	Elected in 1890. Retired.	1883–1893 [data missing]
George W. Murray (Sumter)	Republican	March 4, 1893 – March 3, 1895	53rd	Elected in 1892. Redistricted to the 1st district.	1893–1903 [data missing]
J. William Stokes (Orangeburg)	Democratic	March 4, 1895 – June 1, 1896	54th	Elected in 1894. Seat declared vacant while being contested because of Democratic election fraud.	1893–1903 [data missing]
Vacant		June 1, 1896 – November 3, 1896	54th		1893–1903 [data missing]
J. William Stokes (Orangeburg)	Democratic	November 3, 1896 – July 6, 1901	54th 55th 56th 57th	Elected to finish his own term. Also elected in 1896 to the next term. Re-elected in 1898. Re-elected in 1900. Died.	1893–1903 [data missing]
Vacant		July 6, 1901 – November 5, 1901	57th		1893–1903 [data missing]
Asbury F. Lever (Lexington)	Democratic	November 5, 1901 – August 1, 1919	57th 58th 59th 60th 61st 62nd 63rd 64th 65th 66th	Elected to finish Stokes's term. Re-elected in 1902. Re-elected in 1904. Re-elected in 1906. Re-elected in 1908. Re-elected in 1910. Re-elected in 1912. Re-elected in 1914. Re-elected in 1916. Re-elected in 1918. Resigned to become member of Federal Farm Loan Board.	1893–1903 [data missing]
Asbury F. Lever (Lexington)	Democratic	November 5, 1901 – August 1, 1919	57th 58th 59th 60th 61st 62nd 63rd 64th 65th 66th	Elected to finish Stokes's term. Re-elected in 1902. Re-elected in 1904. Re-elected in 1906. Re-elected in 1908. Re-elected in 1910. Re-elected in 1912. Re-elected in 1914. Re-elected in 1916. Re-elected in 1918. Resigned to become member of Federal Farm Loan Board.	1903–1913 [data missing]
Asbury F. Lever (Lexington)	Democratic	November 5, 1901 – August 1, 1919	57th 58th 59th 60th 61st 62nd 63rd 64th 65th 66th	Elected to finish Stokes's term. Re-elected in 1902. Re-elected in 1904. Re-elected in 1906. Re-elected in 1908. Re-elected in 1910. Re-elected in 1912. Re-elected in 1914. Re-elected in 1916. Re-elected in 1918. Resigned to become member of Federal Farm Loan Board.	1913–1923 [data missing]
Vacant		August 1, 1919 – October 7, 1919	66th		1913–1923 [data missing]
Edward C. Mann (St. Matthews)	Democratic	October 7, 1919 – March 3, 1921	66th	Elected to finish Lever's term. Lost renomination.	1913–1923 [data missing]
Hampton P. Fulmer (Orangeburg)	Democratic	March 4, 1921 – March 3, 1933	67th 68th 69th 70th 71st 72nd	Elected in 1920. Re-elected in 1922. Re-elected in 1924. Re-elected in 1926. Re-elected in 1928. Re-elected in 1930. Redistricted to the 2nd district.	1913–1923 [data missing]
Hampton P. Fulmer (Orangeburg)	Democratic	March 4, 1921 – March 3, 1933	67th 68th 69th 70th 71st 72nd	Elected in 1920. Re-elected in 1922. Re-elected in 1924. Re-elected in 1926. Re-elected in 1928. Re-elected in 1930. Redistricted to the 2nd district.	1923–1933 [data missing]
District dissolved March 3, 1933
District re-established January 3, 2013
Tom Rice (Myrtle Beach)	Republican	January 3, 2013 – January 3, 2023	113th 114th 115th 116th 117th	Elected in 2012. Re-elected in 2014. Re-elected in 2016. Re-elected in 2018. Re-elected in 2020. Lost renomination.	2013–2023
Russell Fry (Murrells Inlet)	Republican	January 3, 2023 – present	118th 119th	Elected in 2022. Re-elected in 2024. Re-elected in 2026.	2023–2033

== Past election results ==
=== 2012 ===
2012 South Carolina's 7th congressional district election
Party	Candidate	Votes	%
Republican	Tom Rice	153,068	55.5
Democratic	Gloria Bromell Tinubu	122,389	44.4
Write-in		281	0.1
Total votes		275,738	100.0
Republican win (new seat)			

=== 2014 ===
2014 South Carolina's 7th congressional district election
Party	Candidate	Votes	%
Republican	Tom Rice (Incumbent)	102,833	59.9
Democratic	Gloria Bromell Tinubu	68,576	40.0
Write-in		115	0.1
Total votes		171,524	100.0
Republican hold			

=== 2016 ===
2016 South Carolina's 7th congressional district election
Party	Candidate	Votes	%
Republican	Tom Rice (incumbent)	176,468	61.0
Democratic	Mal Hyman	112,744	38.9
Write-in		251	0.1
Total votes		289,463	100.0
Republican hold			

=== 2018 ===
2018 South Carolina's 7th congressional district election
Party	Candidate	Votes	%
Republican	Tom Rice (incumbent)	142,681	59.6
Democratic	Robert Williams	96,564	40.3
Write-in		309	0.1
Total votes		239,554	100.0
Republican hold			

=== 2020 ===
2020 South Carolina's 7th congressional district election
Party	Candidate	Votes	%
Republican	Tom Rice (incumbent)	224,993	61.8
Democratic	Melissa Ward Watson	138,863	38.1
Write-in		235	0.1
Total votes		364,091	100.0
Republican hold			

=== 2022 ===
2022 South Carolina's 7th congressional district election
Party	Candidate	Votes	%
Republican	Russell Fry	164,440	64.7
Democratic	Daryl W. Scott	89,030	35.0
Write-in		395	0.1
Total votes		253,865	100.0
Republican hold			

=== 2024 ===
2024 South Carolina's 7th congressional district election
Party	Candidate	Votes	%
Republican	Russell Fry (incumbent)	240,326	64.9
Democratic	Mal Hyman	129,522	35.0
Write-in		481	0.1
Total votes		370,329	100.0
Republican hold			

== See also ==
- List of United States congressional districts
- South Carolina's congressional districts
