= Edward C. Mann =

American politician

Edward Coke Mann
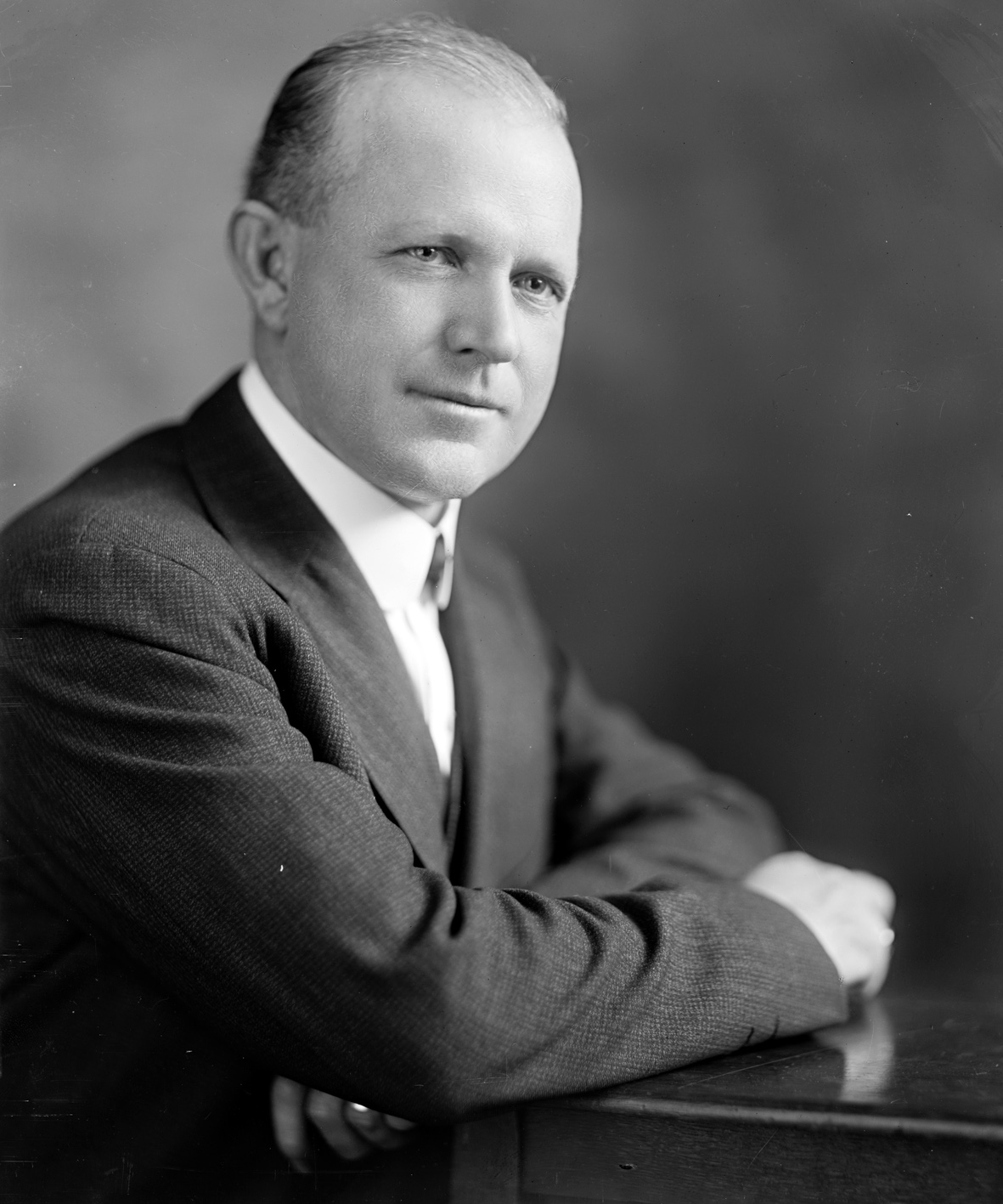

Member of the U.S. House of Representatives from South Carolina's 7th district
- In office October 7, 1919 – March 3, 1921
- Preceded by: Asbury F. Lever
- Succeeded by: Hampton P. Fulmer

Personal details
- Born: November 21, 1880 Lowndesville, South Carolina
- Died: November 11, 1931 (aged 50)
- Resting place: Orangeburg, South Carolina
- Party: Democratic
- Education: The Citadel; University of South Carolina
- Profession: teacher, lawyer

Edward Coke Mann (November 21, 1880 – November 11, 1931) was a U.S. representative from South Carolina.

Born in Lowndesville, South Carolina, Mann attended the common schools and was graduated from The Citadel, Charleston, South Carolina, in 1901.

He taught school one year and was connected with a tobacco company for four years. He graduated from the law department of the University of South Carolina at Columbia in 1906, where he was a member of the Euphradian Society, and commenced practice in St. Matthews, Calhoun County, South Carolina. He served as solicitor of the first circuit of South Carolina 1916-1919.

Mann was elected as a Democrat to the 66th Congress to fill the vacancy caused by the resignation of Asbury Francis Lever and served from October 7, 1919, to March 3, 1921. He unsuccessfully tried to gain renomination in 1920.

He practiced law in Orangeburg, South Carolina. He was appointed master in equity for Orangeburg County in November 1923. He was reappointed in November 1927 and served until his death. He was accidentally killed while on a hunting trip. He was interred in Sunnyside Cemetery, Orangeburg, South Carolina.

== Sources ==
- United States Congress. "Edward C. Mann (id: M000101)". Biographical Directory of the United States Congress.

U.S. House of Representatives
Preceded by Asbury F. Lever	Member of the U.S. House of Representatives from South Carolina's 7th congressional district 1919-1921	Succeeded by Hampton P. Fulmer
