= Paul G. McCorkle =

American politician (1863–1934)

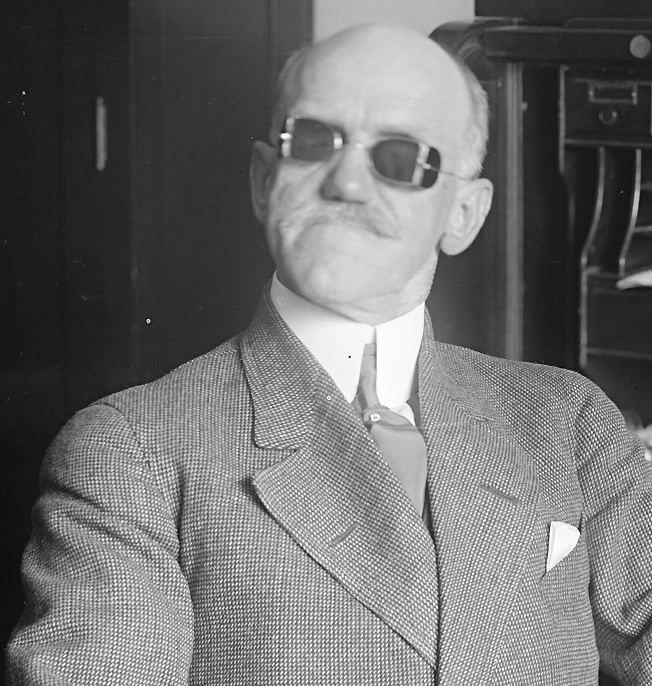

Member of the U.S. House of Representatives from South Carolina's 5th district
- In office February 21, 1917 – March 3, 1917
- Preceded by: David E. Finley
- Succeeded by: William F. Stevenson

Personal details
- Born: Paul Grier McCorkle; December 19, 1863 Yorkville, South Carolina
- Died: June 2, 1934 (aged 70) Knoxville, Tennessee
- Resting place: York, South Carolina
- Party: Democratic
- Education: Kings Mountain Military School
- Occupation: cotton broker

Paul Grier McCorkle (December 19, 1863 – June 2, 1934) was a U.S. Representative from South Carolina.

Born in Yorkville (now York), York County, South Carolina, Mccorkle attended the public schools of his native city and Kings Mountain Military School, York, South Carolina. He was employed as a clerk in York, South Carolina. Cotton buyer and grader in Lancaster, South Carolina, and then in Chester, South Carolina. He returned to York, South Carolina, and engaged in business as a cotton broker and export classifier.

Mccorkle was elected as a Democrat to the Sixty-fourth Congress, by special election, to fill the vacancy caused by the death of United States Representative David E. Finley (February 21, 1917 – March 3, 1917). He was not a candidate for renomination in 1916. He engaged in the cotton brokerage business in York, South Carolina. Coroner of York County, South Carolina, from 1920 until his death in Knoxville, Tennessee, on June 2, 1934. He was interred in Rose Hill Cemetery, York, South Carolina.

== Sources ==
- United States Congress. "Paul G. McCorkle (id: M000363)". Biographical Directory of the United States Congress.

U.S. House of Representatives
Preceded by David E. Finley	Member of the U.S. House of Representatives from South Carolina's 5th congressional district 1917	Succeeded by William F. Stevenson
