= South Carolina's 6th congressional district =

U.S. House district for South Carolina

Coordinates: 33.25°N 80.59°W

- Interactive map of district boundaries since January 3, 2023
- Representative: Jim Clyburn; D–Columbia
- Population (2025): 755,061
- Median household income: $64,131
- Ethnicity: 46.8% Black; 41.6% White; 6.2% Hispanic; 3.0% Two or more races; 1.5% Asian; 0.8% other
- Cook PVI: D+13

South Carolina's 6th congressional district is in central and eastern South Carolina. It includes all of Allendale, Bamberg, Calhoun, Clarendon, Hampton, and Williamsburg counties and parts of Charleston, Colleton, Dorchester, Florence, Jasper, Orangeburg, Richland and Sumter counties. South Carolina's 6th is a majority-minority district, with a black plurality. With a Cook Partisan Voting Index rating of D+13, it is the only Democratic district in South Carolina.

== Borders ==
The district's current configuration dates from a deal struck in the early 1990s between state Republicans and Democrats in the South Carolina General Assembly to create a majority-black district. The rural counties of the historical black belt in South Carolina make up much of the district, but it sweeps south to include most of the majority-black areas near Beaufort (though not Beaufort itself), then sweeps east to cover most of the majority-black precincts in and around Charleston, and sweeps north to include most of the majority-black precincts in and around Columbia.

From 1993 to 2013, the district stretched from the Pee Dee to the Atlantic Coast, sweeping west to take in most of the majority-black areas of the Midlands. The district borders were shifted south in the 2012 redistricting. It lost its share of the Pee Dee while picking up almost all of the majority-black precincts in the Lowcountry. It now takes in part of the area near the South Carolina-Georgia border, reaching just far enough to the north to grab its share of Columbia itself. In all of its configurations, its politics have been dominated by black voters in the Columbia and Charleston areas.

Following the Reconstruction era, the white Democratic-dominated legislature passed Jim Crow laws, as well as a new constitution in 1895 that effectively disfranchised blacks, crippling the Republican Party in the state. For most of the next 60 years, South Carolina was essentially a one-party state dominated by the Democrats, and blacks were nearly excluded from the political system.

Demographic and political changes have included the Great Migration of blacks out of the state during the Jim Crow era in the first half of the 20th century. At the same time, many white Democrats felt chagrin at the national party's greater support of civil rights for blacks from the 1940s onward, and began splitting their tickets in federal elections. After successes of the Civil Rights Movement in gaining passage of federal legislation in the mid-1960s to enforce their constitutional rights and ability to vote, blacks in South Carolina supported national Democratic candidates. Even before then, white conservatives had begun splitting their tickets and voting for Republicans at the federal level as early as the 1950s, and gradually began moving into the Republican Party in the 1980s.

Since the late 20th century, South Carolina politics have been very racially polarized. Republicans in South Carolina have been mostly white, and most African Americans in the state continue to support the Democrats. In the 21st century, the 6th is considered the only "safe" Democratic district in the state.

From 1883 to 1993, this district included the northeastern part of the state, from Darlington to Myrtle Beach. In this configuration, it was a classic "Yellow Dog" Democratic district; from the end of Reconstruction until 1983, it only elected two Republicans, both for a single term. In 2012, the new 7th congressional district was created; it includes much of the territory that was in the 6th for most of the 20th century.

Jim Clyburn, a Democrat and the Majority Whip from 2019 to 2023, has represented this district since first being elected in 1992.

== Composition ==
For the 118th and successive Congresses (based on redistricting following the 2020 census), the district contains all or portions of the following counties and communities:

Allendale County (4)

All 4 communities

Bamberg County (5)

All 5 communities

Calhoun County (2)

Cameron, St. Matthews

Charleston County (7)

Adams Run, Charleston (part; also 1st; shared with Berkeley County), Hollywood, Lincolnville, Meggett, North Charleston (part; also 1st; shared with Berkeley and Dorchester counties), Ravenel

Clarendon County (8)

All 8 communities

Colleton County (7)

Cottageville, Islandton, Jacksonboro, Lodge, Smoaks, Walterboro, Williams

Dorchester County (6)

Grover, Harleyville, North Charleston (part; also 1st; shared with Berkeley and Charleston counties), Reevesville, Ridgeville, St. George

Florence County (2)

Lake City, Scranton (part; also 7th)

Hampton County (10)

All 10 communities

Jasper County (4)

Coosawhatchie, Gillisonville, Hardeesville (part; also 1st), Ridgeland (part; also 1st; shared with Beaufort County)

Orangeburg County (12)

Bowman, Branchville, Brookdale, Edisto, Elloree, Eutawville, Holly Hill, Orangeburg, Rowesville, Santee, Vance, Wilkinson Heights

Richland County (9)

Arthurtown, Capitol View (part; also 2nd), Cayce (part; also 2nd; shared with Lexington County), Columbia (part; also 2nd; shared with Lexington County), Eastover, Gadsden, Hopkins, Olympia, St. Andrews (part; also 2nd)

Sumter County (6)

East Sumter (part; also 5th), Lakewood, Mayesville, Shiloh, South Sumter, Sumter (part; also 5th)

Williamsburg County (6)

All 6 communities

== Recent election results from statewide races ==
Year	Office	Results
2008	President	Obama 67% - 32%
2012	President	Obama 68% - 32%
2016	President	Clinton 64% - 32%
2016	Senate	Dixon 59% - 39%
2018	Governor	Smith 68% - 32%
2018	Secretary of State	Whittenburg 66% - 34%
2018	Treasurer	Glenn 63% - 33%
2018	Attorney General	Anastopoulo 66% - 32%
2020	President	Biden 65% - 33%
2020	Senate	Harrison 66% - 33%
2022	Senate	Matthews 59% - 41%
2022	Governor	Cunningham 63% - 36%
2022	Secretary of State	Peggy Butler 59% - 41%
2024	President	Harris 61% - 38%
2026	Senate	Andrews 70% - 27%
2026	Governor	Johnson 67% - 31%

== List of members representing the district ==
Member (Residence)	Party	Years	Cong ress	Electoral history	District location
District established March 4, 1793
Andrew Pickens (Hopewell)	Anti-Administration	March 4, 1793 – March 3, 1795	3rd	Elected in 1793. Retired.	1793–1797 "Pinckney and Washington district"
Samuel Earle (Pendleton District)	Democratic-Republican	March 4, 1795 – March 3, 1797	4th	Elected in 1794. Retired.	1793–1797 "Pinckney and Washington district"
William Smith (Spartanburg)	Democratic-Republican	March 4, 1797 – March 3, 1799	5th	Elected in 1796. Lost re-election.	1797–1803 "Washington district" 1796 election results by district
Abraham Nott (Union)	Federalist	March 4, 1799 – March 3, 1801	6th	Elected in 1798. Retired.	1797–1803 "Washington district" 1796 election results by district
Thomas Moore (Spartanburg)	Democratic-Republican	March 4, 1801 – March 3, 1803	7th	Elected in 1800. Redistricted to the 7th district.	1797–1803 "Washington district" 1796 election results by district
Levi Casey (Newberry County)	Democratic-Republican	March 4, 1803 – February 3, 1807	8th 9th	Elected in 1803. Re-elected in 1804. Re-elected in 1806. Died.	1803–1813 "Abbeville district"
Vacant		February 3, 1807 – June 2, 1807	9th 10th		1803–1813 "Abbeville district"
Joseph Calhoun (Calhoun Mills)	Democratic-Republican	June 2, 1807 – March 3, 1811	10th 11th	Elected to finish Casey's term. Re-elected in 1808. Retired.	1803–1813 "Abbeville district"
John C. Calhoun (Willington)	Democratic-Republican	March 4, 1811 – November 3, 1817	12th 13th 14th 15th	Elected in 1810. Re-elected in 1812. Re-elected in 1814. Re-elected in 1816. Resigned to become U.S. secretary of war.	1803–1813 "Abbeville district"
John C. Calhoun (Willington)	Democratic-Republican	March 4, 1811 – November 3, 1817	12th 13th 14th 15th	Elected in 1810. Re-elected in 1812. Re-elected in 1814. Re-elected in 1816. Resigned to become U.S. secretary of war.	1813–1823 "Abbeville district"
Vacant		November 3, 1817 – January 24, 1818	15th		1813–1823 "Abbeville district"
Eldred Simkins (Edgefield)	Democratic-Republican	January 24, 1818 – March 3, 1821	15th 16th	Elected to finish Calhoun's term. Re-elected in 1818. Retired.	1813–1823 "Abbeville district"
George McDuffie (Edgefield)	Democratic-Republican	March 4, 1821 – March 3, 1823	17th	Elected in 1820. Redistricted to the 5th district.	1813–1823 "Abbeville district"
John Wilson (Golden Grove)	Democratic-Republican	March 4, 1823 – March 3, 1825	18th 19th	Redistricted from the 7th district and re-elected in 1823. Re-elected in 1824. Lost re-election.	1823–1833 "Pendleton district"
John Wilson (Golden Grove)	Jacksonian	March 4, 1825 – March 3, 1827	18th 19th	Redistricted from the 7th district and re-elected in 1823. Re-elected in 1824. Lost re-election.	1823–1833 "Pendleton district"
Warren R. Davis (Pendleton)	Jacksonian	March 4, 1827 – March 3, 1831	20th 21st 22nd 23rd	Elected in 1826. Re-elected in 1828. Re-elected in 1830. Re-elected in 1833. Re-elected in 1834 but died before next term began.	1823–1833 "Pendleton district"
Warren R. Davis (Pendleton)	Nullifier	March 4, 1831 – January 29, 1835	20th 21st 22nd 23rd	Elected in 1826. Re-elected in 1828. Re-elected in 1830. Re-elected in 1833. Re-elected in 1834 but died before next term began.	1823–1833 "Pendleton district"
Warren R. Davis (Pendleton)	Nullifier	March 4, 1831 – January 29, 1835	20th 21st 22nd 23rd	Elected in 1826. Re-elected in 1828. Re-elected in 1830. Re-elected in 1833. Re-elected in 1834 but died before next term began.	1833–1843 [data missing]
Vacant		January 29, 1835 – September 10, 1835	23rd 24th		1833–1843 [data missing]
Waddy Thompson Jr. (Greenville)	Anti-Jackson	September 10, 1835 – March 3, 1837	24th 25th 26th	Elected to finish Davis's term. Re-elected in 1836. Re-elected in 1838. Retired.	1833–1843 [data missing]
Waddy Thompson Jr. (Greenville)	Whig	March 4, 1837 – March 3, 1841	24th 25th 26th	Elected to finish Davis's term. Re-elected in 1836. Re-elected in 1838. Retired.	1833–1843 [data missing]
William Butler (Greenville)	Whig	March 4, 1841 – March 3, 1843	27th	Elected in 1840. Redistricted to the 2nd district and lost re-election.	1833–1843 [data missing]
Isaac E. Holmes (Charleston)	Democratic	March 4, 1843 – March 3, 1851	28th 29th 30th 31st	Redistricted from the 1st district and re-elected in 1843. Re-elected in 1844. Re-elected in 1846. Re-elected in 1848. Lost re-election.	1843–1853 [data missing]
William Aiken Jr. (Charleston)	Democratic	March 4, 1851 – March 3, 1853	32nd	Elected in 1850. Redistricted to the 2nd district.	1843–1853 [data missing]
William W. Boyce (Winnsboro)	Democratic	March 4, 1853 – December 21, 1860	33rd 34th 35th 36th	Elected in 1853. Re-elected in 1854. Re-elected in 1856. Re-elected in 1858. Re-elected in 1860 but retired due to Civil War.	1853–1860 [data missing]
District inactive		December 21, 1860 – March 3, 1867	36th 37th 38th 39th	Civil War and Reconstruction	
District dissolved March 3, 1867
District re-established March 4, 1883
George W. Dargan (Darlington)	Democratic	March 4, 1883 – March 3, 1891	48th 49th 50th 51st	Elected in 1882. Re-elected in 1884. Re-elected in 1886. Re-elected in 1888. Retired.	1883–1893 [data missing]
Eli T. Stackhouse (Little Rock)	Democratic	March 4, 1891 – June 14, 1892	52nd	Elected in 1890. Died.	1883–1893 [data missing]
Vacant		June 14, 1892 – December 5, 1892	52nd		1883–1893 [data missing]
John L. McLaurin (Bennettsville)	Democratic	December 5, 1892 – May 31, 1897	52nd 53rd 54th 55th	Elected to finish Stackhouse's term. Also elected to the next full term. Re-elected in 1894. Re-elected in 1896. Resigned when appointed U.S. Senator.	1883–1893 [data missing]
John L. McLaurin (Bennettsville)	Democratic	December 5, 1892 – May 31, 1897	52nd 53rd 54th 55th	Elected to finish Stackhouse's term. Also elected to the next full term. Re-elected in 1894. Re-elected in 1896. Resigned when appointed U.S. Senator.	1893–1903 [data missing]
Vacant		May 31, 1897 – December 6, 1897	55th		1893–1903 [data missing]
James Norton (Mullins)	Democratic	December 6, 1897 – March 3, 1901	55th 56th	Elected to finish McLaurin's term. Re-elected in 1898. Retired.	1893–1903 [data missing]
Robert B. Scarborough (Conway)	Democratic	March 4, 1901 – March 3, 1905	57th 58th	Elected in 1900. Re-elected in 1902. Retired.	1893–1903 [data missing]
Robert B. Scarborough (Conway)	Democratic	March 4, 1901 – March 3, 1905	57th 58th	Elected in 1900. Re-elected in 1902. Retired.	1903–1913 [data missing]
J. Edwin Ellerbe (Marion)	Democratic	March 4, 1905 – March 3, 1913	59th 60th 61st 62nd	Elected in 1904. Re-elected in 1906. Re-elected in 1908. Re-elected in 1910. Lost renomination.	1903–1913 [data missing]
J. Willard Ragsdale (Florence)	Democratic	March 4, 1913 – July 23, 1919	63rd 64th 65th 66th	Elected in 1912. Re-elected in 1914. Re-elected in 1916. Re-elected in 1918. Died.	1913–1923 [data missing]
Vacant		July 23, 1919 – October 7, 1919	66th		1913–1923 [data missing]
Philip H. Stoll (Kingstree)	Democratic	October 7, 1919 – March 3, 1923	66th 67th	Elected to finish Ragsdale's term. Re-elected in 1920. Lost renomination.	1913–1923 [data missing]
Allard H. Gasque (Florence)	Democratic	March 4, 1923 – June 17, 1938	68th 69th 70th 71st 72nd 73rd 74th 75th	Elected in 1922. Re-elected in 1924. Re-elected in 1926. Re-elected in 1928. Re-elected in 1930. Re-elected in 1932. Re-elected in 1934. Re-elected in 1936. Died.	1923–1933 [data missing]
Allard H. Gasque (Florence)	Democratic	March 4, 1923 – June 17, 1938	68th 69th 70th 71st 72nd 73rd 74th 75th	Elected in 1922. Re-elected in 1924. Re-elected in 1926. Re-elected in 1928. Re-elected in 1930. Re-elected in 1932. Re-elected in 1934. Re-elected in 1936. Died.	1933–1943 [data missing]
Vacant		June 17, 1938 – September 13, 1938	75th		1933–1943 [data missing]
Elizabeth H. Gasque (Florence)	Democratic	September 13, 1938 – January 3, 1939	75th	Elected to finish her husband's term. Retired.	1933–1943 [data missing]
John L. McMillan (Florence)	Democratic	January 3, 1939 – January 3, 1973	76th 77th 78th 79th 80th 81st 82nd 83rd 84th 85th 86th 87th 88th 89th 90th 91st 92nd	Elected in 1938. Re-elected in 1940. Re-elected in 1942. Re-elected in 1944. Re-elected in 1946. Re-elected in 1948. Re-elected in 1950. Re-elected in 1952. Re-elected in 1954. Re-elected in 1956. Re-elected in 1958. Re-elected in 1960. Re-elected in 1962. Re-elected in 1964. Re-elected in 1966. Re-elected in 1968. Re-elected in 1970. Lost renomination.	1933–1943 [data missing]
John L. McMillan (Florence)	Democratic	January 3, 1939 – January 3, 1973	76th 77th 78th 79th 80th 81st 82nd 83rd 84th 85th 86th 87th 88th 89th 90th 91st 92nd	Elected in 1938. Re-elected in 1940. Re-elected in 1942. Re-elected in 1944. Re-elected in 1946. Re-elected in 1948. Re-elected in 1950. Re-elected in 1952. Re-elected in 1954. Re-elected in 1956. Re-elected in 1958. Re-elected in 1960. Re-elected in 1962. Re-elected in 1964. Re-elected in 1966. Re-elected in 1968. Re-elected in 1970. Lost renomination.	1943–1953 [data missing]
John L. McMillan (Florence)	Democratic	January 3, 1939 – January 3, 1973	76th 77th 78th 79th 80th 81st 82nd 83rd 84th 85th 86th 87th 88th 89th 90th 91st 92nd	Elected in 1938. Re-elected in 1940. Re-elected in 1942. Re-elected in 1944. Re-elected in 1946. Re-elected in 1948. Re-elected in 1950. Re-elected in 1952. Re-elected in 1954. Re-elected in 1956. Re-elected in 1958. Re-elected in 1960. Re-elected in 1962. Re-elected in 1964. Re-elected in 1966. Re-elected in 1968. Re-elected in 1970. Lost renomination.	1953–1963 [data missing]
John L. McMillan (Florence)	Democratic	January 3, 1939 – January 3, 1973	76th 77th 78th 79th 80th 81st 82nd 83rd 84th 85th 86th 87th 88th 89th 90th 91st 92nd	Elected in 1938. Re-elected in 1940. Re-elected in 1942. Re-elected in 1944. Re-elected in 1946. Re-elected in 1948. Re-elected in 1950. Re-elected in 1952. Re-elected in 1954. Re-elected in 1956. Re-elected in 1958. Re-elected in 1960. Re-elected in 1962. Re-elected in 1964. Re-elected in 1966. Re-elected in 1968. Re-elected in 1970. Lost renomination.	1963–1973 [data missing]
Edward Lunn Young (Florence)	Republican	January 3, 1973 – January 3, 1975	93rd	Elected in 1972. Lost re-election.	1973–1983 [data missing]
John Jenrette (North Myrtle Beach)	Democratic	January 3, 1975 – December 10, 1980	94th 95th 96th	Elected in 1974. Re-elected in 1976. Re-elected in 1978. Lost re-election and resigned early as a result of the ABSCAM scandal.	1973–1983 [data missing]
John L. Napier (Bennettsville)	Republican	January 3, 1981 – January 3, 1983	97th	Elected in 1980. Lost re-election.	1973–1983 [data missing]
Robin Tallon (Florence)	Democratic	January 3, 1983 – January 3, 1993	98th 99th 100th 101st 102nd	Elected in 1982. Re-elected in 1984. Re-elected in 1986. Re-elected in 1988. Re-elected in 1990. Retired following redistricting.	1983–1993 [data missing]
Jim Clyburn (Columbia)	Democratic	January 3, 1993 – present	103rd 104th 105th 106th 107th 108th 109th 110th 111th 112th 113th 114th 115th 116th 117th 118th 119th	Elected in 1992. Re-elected in 1994. Re-elected in 1996. Re-elected in 1998. Re-elected in 2000. Re-elected in 2002. Re-elected in 2004. Re-elected in 2006. Re-elected in 2008. Re-elected in 2010. Re-elected in 2012. Re-elected in 2014. Re-elected in 2016. Re-elected in 2018. Re-elected in 2020. Re-elected in 2022. Re-elected in 2024. Re-elected in 2026.	1993–2003 [data missing]
Jim Clyburn (Columbia)	Democratic	January 3, 1993 – present	103rd 104th 105th 106th 107th 108th 109th 110th 111th 112th 113th 114th 115th 116th 117th 118th 119th	Elected in 1992. Re-elected in 1994. Re-elected in 1996. Re-elected in 1998. Re-elected in 2000. Re-elected in 2002. Re-elected in 2004. Re-elected in 2006. Re-elected in 2008. Re-elected in 2010. Re-elected in 2012. Re-elected in 2014. Re-elected in 2016. Re-elected in 2018. Re-elected in 2020. Re-elected in 2022. Re-elected in 2024. Re-elected in 2026.	2003–2013
Jim Clyburn (Columbia)	Democratic	January 3, 1993 – present	103rd 104th 105th 106th 107th 108th 109th 110th 111th 112th 113th 114th 115th 116th 117th 118th 119th	Elected in 1992. Re-elected in 1994. Re-elected in 1996. Re-elected in 1998. Re-elected in 2000. Re-elected in 2002. Re-elected in 2004. Re-elected in 2006. Re-elected in 2008. Re-elected in 2010. Re-elected in 2012. Re-elected in 2014. Re-elected in 2016. Re-elected in 2018. Re-elected in 2020. Re-elected in 2022. Re-elected in 2024. Re-elected in 2026.	2013–2023
Jim Clyburn (Columbia)	Democratic	January 3, 1993 – present	103rd 104th 105th 106th 107th 108th 109th 110th 111th 112th 113th 114th 115th 116th 117th 118th 119th	Elected in 1992. Re-elected in 1994. Re-elected in 1996. Re-elected in 1998. Re-elected in 2000. Re-elected in 2002. Re-elected in 2004. Re-elected in 2006. Re-elected in 2008. Re-elected in 2010. Re-elected in 2012. Re-elected in 2014. Re-elected in 2016. Re-elected in 2018. Re-elected in 2020. Re-elected in 2022. Re-elected in 2024. Re-elected in 2026.	2023–2033

== Past election results ==
=== 2012 ===
2012 South Carolina's 6th congressional district election
Party	Candidate	Votes	%
Democratic	Jim Clyburn (incumbent)	218,717	93.6
Green	Nammu Y. Muhammad	12,920	5.5
Write-in		1,978	0.9
Total votes		233,615	100.0
Democratic hold			

=== 2014 ===
2014 South Carolina's 6th congressional district election
Party	Candidate	Votes	%
Democratic	Jim Clyburn (incumbent)	125,747	72.5
Republican	Anthony Culler	44,311	25.6
Libertarian	Kevin Umbaugh	3,176	1.8
Write-in		198	0.1
Total votes		173,432	100.0
Democratic hold			

=== 2016 ===
2016 South Carolina's 6th congressional district election
Party	Candidate	Votes	%
Democratic	Jim Clyburn (incumbent)	177,947	70.1
Republican	Laura Sterling	70,099	27.6
Libertarian	Rich Piotrowski	3,131	1.2
Green	Prince Charles Mallory	2,499	1.0
Write-in		225	0.1
Total votes		253,901	100.0
Democratic hold			

=== 2018 ===
2018 South Carolina's 6th congressional district election
Party	Candidate	Votes	%
Democratic	Jim Clyburn (incumbent)	144,765	70.1
Republican	Gerhard Gressmann	58,282	28.2
Green	Bryan Pugh	3,214	1.6
Write-in		172	0.1
Total votes		206,433	100.0
Democratic hold			

=== 2020 ===
2020 South Carolina's 6th congressional district election
Party	Candidate	Votes	%
Democratic	Jim Clyburn (incumbent)	197,477	68.2
Republican	John McCollum	89,258	30.8
Constitution	Mark Hackett	2,646	0.9
Write-in		272	0.1
Total votes		289,653	100.0
Democratic hold			

=== 2022 ===
2022 South Carolina's 6th congressional district election
Party	Candidate	Votes	%
Democratic	Jim Clyburn (incumbent)	130,923	62.0
Republican	Duke Buckner	79,879	37.9
Write-in		226	0.1
Total votes		211,028	100.0
Democratic hold			

=== 2024 ===
2024 South Carolina's 6th congressional district election
Party	Candidate	Votes	%
Democratic	Jim Clyburn (incumbent)	182,056	59.5
Republican	Duke Buckner	112,360	36.7
Libertarian	Michael Simpson	5,279	1.7
United Citizens	Gregg Dixon	4,927	1.6
Alliance	Joseph Oddo	1,056	0.3
Write-in		299	0.1
Total votes		305,977	100.0
Democratic hold			

== See also ==
- List of United States congressional districts
- South Carolina's congressional districts
