= John C. Taylor =

U.S. Congressman from South Carolina

Member of the South Carolina Senate from Anderson County
- In office January 13, 1959 – January 8, 1963
- Preceded by: James Byrum Lawson
- Succeeded by: James Byrum Lawson
- In office January 9, 1951 – January 11, 1954
- Preceded by: James Burriss Pruitt
- Succeeded by: James Byrum Lawson

Member of the U.S. House of Representatives from South Carolina's 3rd district
- In office March 4, 1933 – January 3, 1939
- Preceded by: Frederick H. Dominick
- Succeeded by: Butler B. Hare

Personal details
- Born: March 2, 1890 Honea Path, South Carolina, U.S.
- Died: March 25, 1983 (aged 93) Anderson, South Carolina, U.S.
- Resting place: Honea Path, South Carolina
- Party: Democratic
- Education: University of South Carolina

Military service
- Allegiance: United States of America
- Branch/service: United States Army
- Battles/wars: World War I

John Clarence Taylor (March 2, 1890 – March 25, 1983) was elected to the U.S. House of Representatives for South Carolina's 3rd congressional district. He served for three terms from 1933 to 1939.

== Biography ==
John Clarence was born in Honea Path, Anderson County, South Carolina, on March 2, 1890. He attended the Fruitland Institute, Hendersonville, North Carolina. He was graduated from the law department of the University of South Carolina in Columbia in 1919. During the First World War, he attended the Officers’ Training School at Camp Johnston in Florida and was discharged into the Reserves at the end of the war. He was admitted to the bar in 1919. He was the clerk of court and register of deeds for Anderson County, South Carolina, from 1920 until elected to Congress. He was elected as a Democrat to the Seventy-third, Seventy-fourth, and Seventy-fifth Congresses (March 4, 1933 – January 3, 1939). He was an unsuccessful candidate for renomination in 1938 to the Seventy-sixth Congress. He resumed his former business pursuits. He served in the South Carolina Senate from 1951 to 1954 and 1959 to 1962. He died in Anderson, South Carolina, on March 25, 1983, and was interred in Garden of Memories, Honea Path, South Carolina.

U.S. House of Representatives
Preceded by Frederick H. Dominick	Member of the U.S. House of Representatives from South Carolina's 3rd congressional district 1933–1939	Succeeded by Butler B. Hare
