= Philip H. Stoll =

American politician (1874–1958)

Philip Henry Stoll
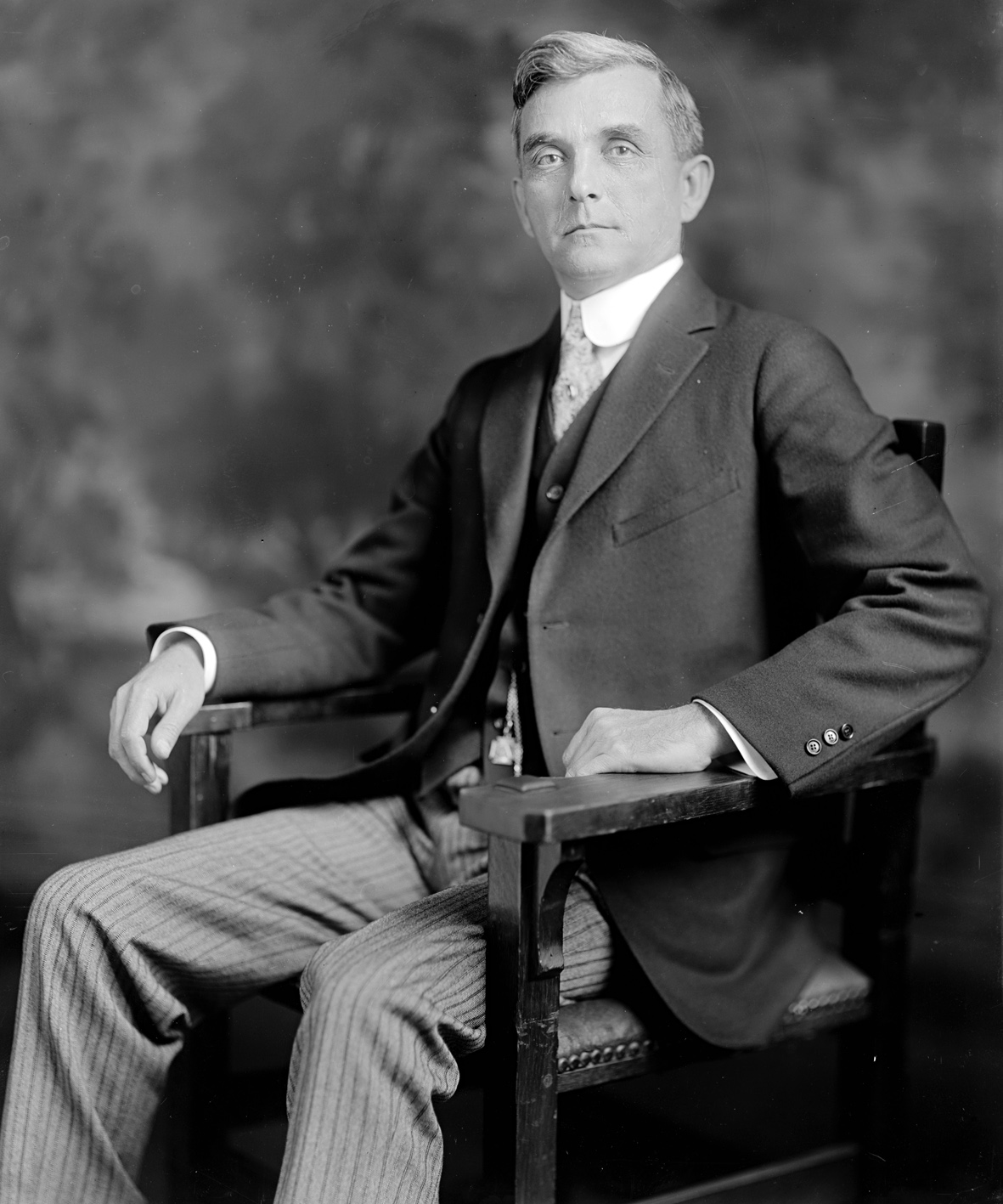

Member of the U.S. House of Representatives from South Carolina's 6th district
- In office October 7, 1919 – March 3, 1923
- Preceded by: J. Willard Ragsdale
- Succeeded by: Allard Henry Gasque

Member of the South Carolina House of Representatives
- In office 1929–1931
- In office 1905–1906

Personal details
- Born: November 5, 1874 Little Rock, South Carolina, U.S.
- Died: October 29, 1958 (aged 83) Columbia, South Carolina, U.S.
- Resting place: Kingstree, South Carolina
- Party: Democratic
- Education: Wofford College
- Profession: Teacher, lawyer, politician

Military service
- Branch/service: United States Army
- Years of service: 1917–1918
- Rank: Lieutenant Colonel
- Unit: Judge Advocate General's Department

Philip Henry Stoll (November 5, 1874 – October 29, 1958) was a U.S. representative from South Carolina. He is infamous for sentencing 14-year-old George Stinney to death in 1944 after he was charged with murdering Betty June Binnicker and Mary Emma Thames. His conviction was vacated in 2014.

== Biography ==
Born in Little Rock, Marion (now Dillon) County, South Carolina, Stoll attended public school.

He graduated from Wofford College, Spartanburg, South Carolina, in 1897. He was a teacher in the public schools 1897–1901. He studied law and was admitted to the bar in 1901. He practiced in Kingstree, South Carolina.

He served as member of the State House of Representatives 1905–1906 and then as solicitor of the third judicial circuit from 1908 to 1917, when he resigned. He served as chairman of the Democratic county committee and member of the Democratic State committee in 1908–1918.

With the outbreak of World War I, he was commissioned as a major in the Judge Advocate General's Department of the United States Army in 1917. He was promoted to the rank of lieutenant colonel in 1918 and served throughout the war.

Stoll was elected as a Democrat to the Sixty-sixth Congress to fill the vacancy caused by the death of J. Willard Ragsdale. He was reelected to the Sixty-seventh Congress and served from October 7, 1919, to March 3, 1923. He was an unsuccessful candidate for renomination in 1922. After serving in Congress, he resumed the practice of law. He was again a member of the State house of representatives from 1929 to 1931. Stoll was elected as a judge of the third judicial circuit of South Carolina in 1931 and served until December 6, 1946, when he retired.

In 1944, Judge Stoll sentenced 14-year-old George Stinney, the second youngest person executed in US history, to death after a 1-day trial and a 10-minute deliberation by an all-white jury. Stinney's conviction was vacated in 2014 due to fundamental constitutional violations.

He died in Columbia, South Carolina, on October 29, 1958. He was interred in Williamsburg Presbyterian Cemetery, Kingstree, South Carolina.

== Sources ==
- United States Congress. "Philip H. Stoll (id: S000951)". Biographical Directory of the United States Congress.

U.S. House of Representatives
Preceded by J. Willard Ragsdale	Member of the U.S. House of Representatives from South Carolina's 6th congressional district 1919–1923	Succeeded by Allard Henry Gasque
