= Frederick H. Dominick =

American politician

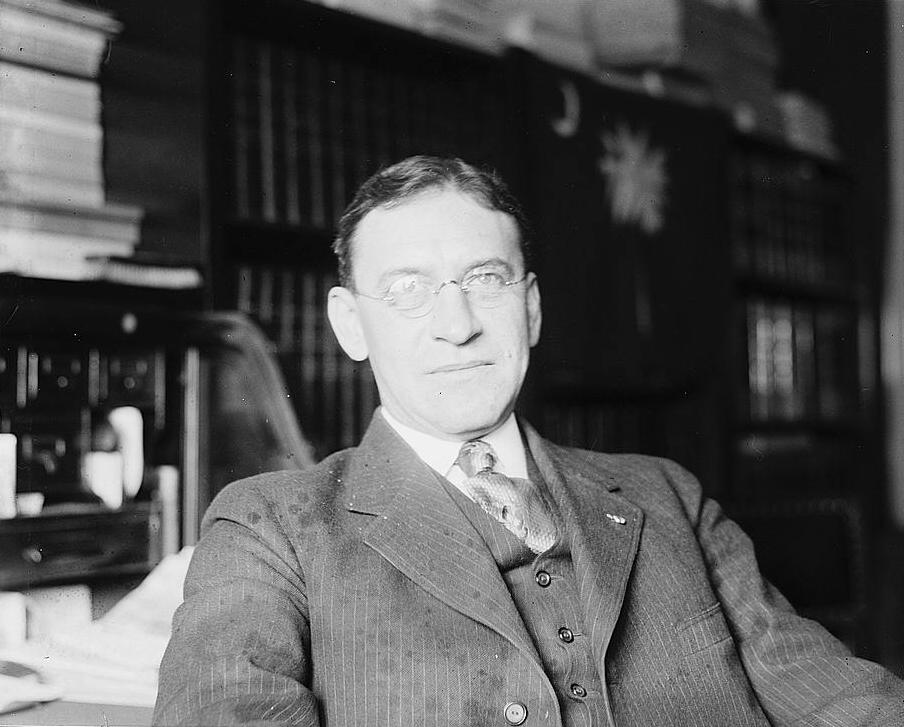

Member of the U.S. House of Representatives from South Carolina's 3rd district
- In office March 4, 1917 – March 3, 1933
- Preceded by: Wyatt Aiken
- Succeeded by: John C. Taylor

Member of the South Carolina House of Representatives from Newberry County
- In office January 8, 1901 – February 22, 1902

Personal details
- Born: February 20, 1877 Peak, South Carolina
- Died: March 11, 1960 (aged 83) Newberry, South Carolina
- Party: Democratic
- Education: Newberry College; University of Virginia
- Profession: Attorney

Frederick Haskell Dominick (February 20, 1877 – March 11, 1960) was elected to the U.S. House of Representatives for South Carolina's 3rd congressional district. He served for eight terms from 1917 to 1933.

== Biography ==
He was born in Peak in Newberry County, South Carolina on February 20, 1877. He attended the public schools of Columbia, South Carolina, Newberry College, South Carolina College in Columbia and the law school of the University of Virginia in Charlottesville. He was admitted to the South Carolina bar in 1898 and commenced practice in Newberry, South Carolina. He was a member of the South Carolina House of Representatives from 1901 to 1902. He was a chairman of the Democratic Party county committee from 1906 to 1914. He served as an assistant attorney general of South Carolina from 1913 to 1916. He was a delegate to the Democratic National Conventions in 1920 and 1924. He was elected to the Sixty-fifth and to the seven succeeding Congresses (March 4, 1917 to March 3, 1933). On April 5, 1917, he was one of 50 representatives who voted against declaring war on Germany, the only person in Congress from South Carolina to so vote. He was an unsuccessful candidate for renomination in 1932. In Congress, he was one of the managers appointed by the United States House of Representatives in 1926 to conduct the impeachment proceedings against George W. English, who was a judge of the United States District Court for the Eastern District of Illinois. During the Second World War, he served as an assistant to the United States Attorney General of the Department of Justice in Washington, D.C. He practiced law in Newberry, South Carolina until his death there March 11, 1960. He was interred in Rosemont Cemetery.

U.S. House of Representatives
Preceded by Wyatt Aiken	Member of the U.S. House of Representatives from South Carolina's 3rd congressional district 1917–1933	Succeeded by John C. Taylor
