= Allard H. Gasque =

American politician (1873–1938)

Allard Henry Gasque
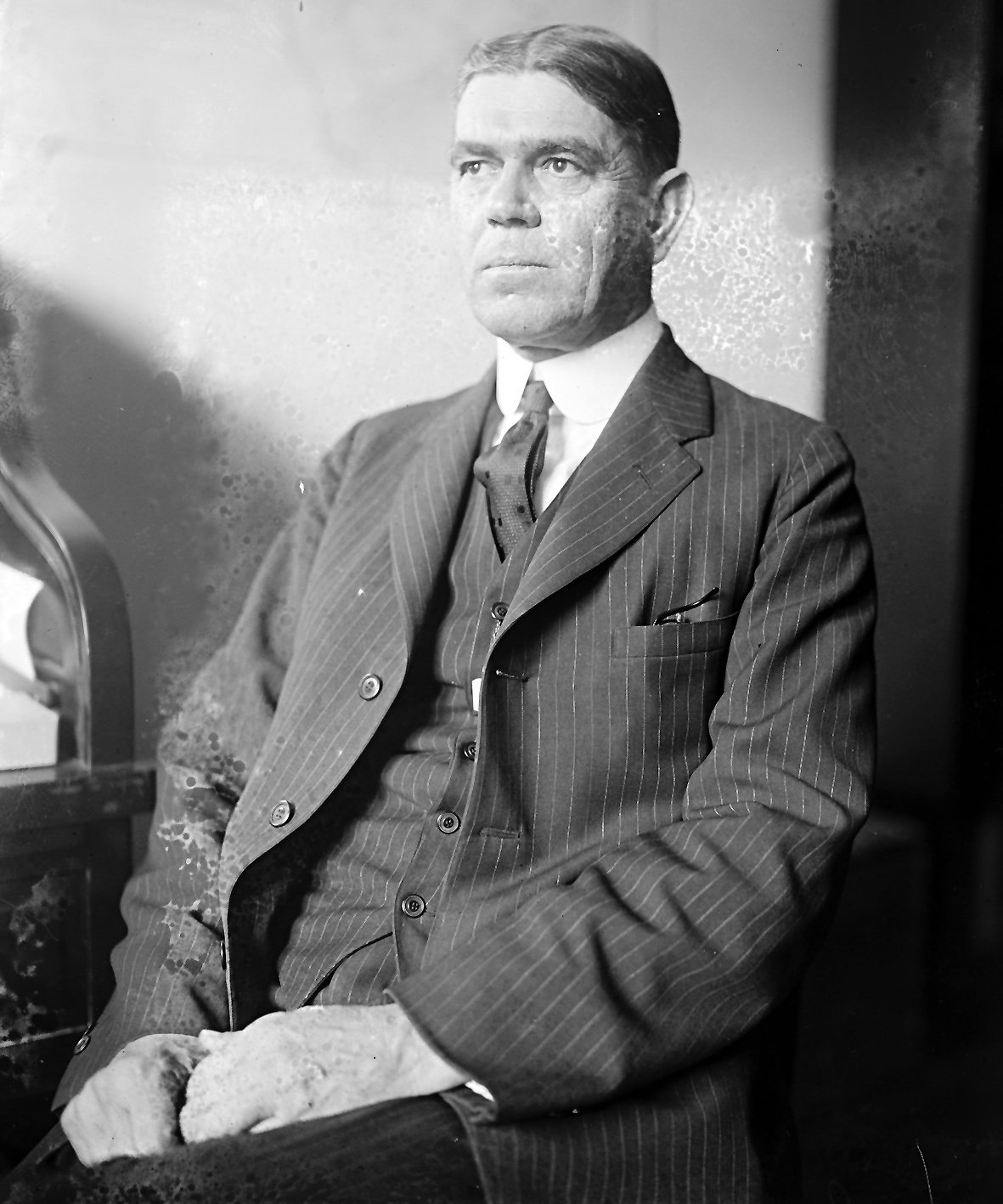

Member of the U.S. House of Representatives from South Carolina's 6th district
- In office March 4, 1923 – June 17, 1938
- Preceded by: Philip H. Stoll
- Succeeded by: Elizabeth Hawley Gasque

Personal details
- Born: March 8, 1873 Friendfield Plantation, Hyman, South Carolina, U.S.
- Died: June 17, 1938 (aged 65) Washington, D.C., U.S.
- Resting place: Florence, South Carolina
- Party: Democratic
- Spouse: Elizabeth Hawley Gasque
- Education: University of South Carolina
- Profession: Teacher, School administrator

Allard Henry Gasque (March 8, 1873 – June 17, 1938) was a U.S. representative from South Carolina from 1923 until his death in June 1938. Following his death, he was succeeded in office by his wife Elizabeth Hawley Gasque.

== Biography ==
=== Early life ===
Born on Friendfield Plantation, near Hyman, Marion (now Florence) County, South Carolina, Gasque attended the public schools. He worked on a farm and taught in the country schools for several years. He graduated from the University of South Carolina at Columbia in 1901.

=== Career ===
He was the principal of Waverly Graded School in Columbia, South Carolina from 1901 to 1902. He was elected superintendent of education of Florence County in 1902 and served by reelection until 1923. He served as President of the county superintendents' association of the State in 1911 and 1912 and of the State teachers' association in 1914 and 1915.

He served as member of the Democratic State executive committee from 1912 to 1920. He served as chairman of the Democratic county committee from 1919 to 1923. He was elected as a Democrat to the Sixty-eighth and to the seven succeeding Congresses and served from March 4, 1923, until his death in Washington, D.C., on June 17, 1938. He served as Chairman of the Committee on Pensions (Seventy-second through Seventy-fifth Congresses).

=== Death ===
He was interred in Mount Hope Cemetery in Florence, South Carolina.

== See also ==
- List of members of the United States Congress who died in office (1900–1949)

== Sources ==
- Allard Henry Gasque Papers at South Carolina Political Collections at the University of South Carolina
- United States Congress. "Allard H. Gasque (id: G000092)". Biographical Directory of the United States Congress.

U.S. House of Representatives
Preceded by Philip H. Stoll	Member of the U.S. House of Representatives from South Carolina's 6th congressional district 1923–1938	Succeeded by Elizabeth Hawley Gasque
