= William Francis Stevenson =

American politician (1861–1942)

Member of the U.S. House of Representatives from South Carolina's 5th district
- In office March 4, 1917 – March 3, 1933
- Preceded by: Paul G. McCorkle
- Succeeded by: James P. Richards

Member of the South Carolina House of Representatives
- In office 1911 – 1914
- In office 1897 – 1902

39th Speaker of the South Carolina House of Representatives
- In office 1900 – 1902
- Preceded by: Frank B. Gary
- Succeeded by: Mendel Smith

Personal details
- Born: William Francis Stevenson; November 23, 1861 Loray, North Carolina
- Died: February 12, 1942 (aged 80) Washington, D.C.
- Resting place: Cheraw, South Carolina
- Party: Democratic
- Education: Davidson College
- Occupation: lawyer, teacher

William Francis Stevenson (November 23, 1861 – February 12, 1942) was a U.S. representative from South Carolina.

Born in what is now Loray, near Statesville, North Carolina, Stevenson attended the public schools and was tutored by his father. He was a teacher in the public schools in 1879 and 1880. He was graduated from Davidson College, Davidson, North Carolina, in 1885. He again engaged in teaching in Cheraw, South Carolina from 1885 to 1887, studying law at the same time. He was admitted to the bar in 1887 and commenced practice in Chesterfield, South Carolina, the same year. He moved to Cheraw in 1892 and continued the practice of law. He served as member of the Democratic executive committee of Chesterfield County 1888-1914, serving as chairman 1896-1902. He served as mayor of Cheraw in 1895 and 1896. He served as member of the State house of representatives 1897-1902, serving as speaker 1900-1902. He declined to be a candidate for reelection. He was interested in various business enterprises in Chesterfield County. He served as district counsel for the Seaboard Air Line Railway 1900-1917. He served as member of the Democratic State executive committee 1901-1942. He served as general counsel for the State dispensary commission 1907-1911. He was again a member of the state house of representatives 1911-1914.

Stevenson was elected as a Democrat to the Sixty-fifth Congress, by special election, to fill the vacancy caused by the death of United States Representative-elect David E. Finley, and reelected to the seven succeeding Congresses (February 21, 1917 – March 3, 1933). He was an unsuccessful candidate for renomination in 1932 to the Seventy-third Congress. He served as member of the Federal Home Loan Bank Board from 1933 to 1939, serving as chairman in 1933. He died in Washington, D.C., on February 12, 1942. He was interred in St. David's Episcopal Church Cemetery, Cheraw, South Carolina.

== Sources ==
- United States Congress. "William Francis Stevenson (id: S000895)". Biographical Directory of the United States Congress.

U.S. House of Representatives
Preceded by Paul G. McCorkle	Member of the U.S. House of Representatives from South Carolina's 5th congressional district 1917–1933	Succeeded by James P. Richards
