= Hampton P. Fulmer =

American politician (1875–1944)

Hampton Pitts Fulmer
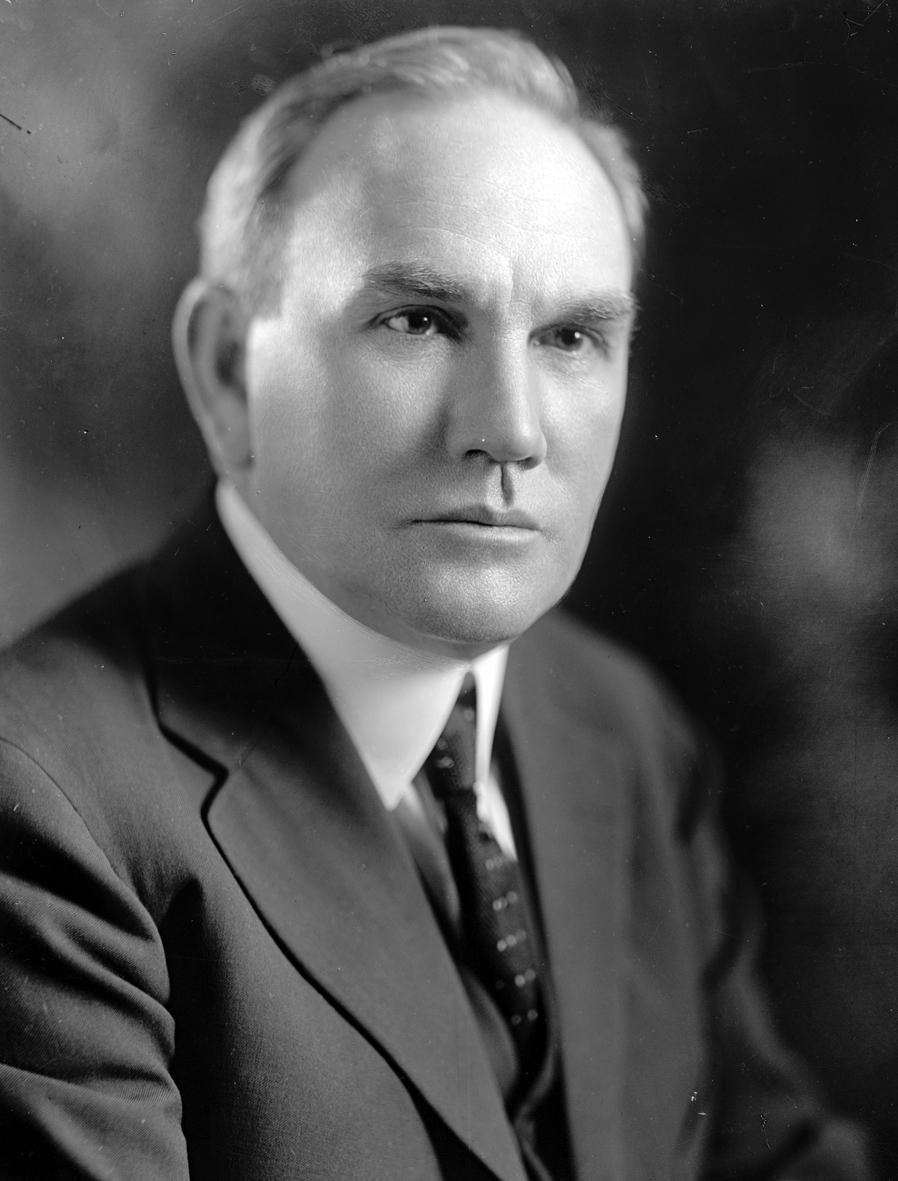

Member of the U.S. House of Representatives from South Carolina
- In office March 4, 1921 – October 19, 1944
- Preceded by: Edward C. Mann (7th); Butler B. Hare (2nd)
- Succeeded by: District eliminated (7th); Willa L. Fulmer (2nd)
- Constituency: 7th district (1921-33); 2nd district (1933-44)

Member of South Carolina House of Representatives from Orangeburg County
- In office January 9, 1917 – March 6, 1920

Personal details
- Born: June 23, 1875 Springfield, South Carolina, U.S.
- Died: October 19, 1944 (aged 69) Washington, D.C., U.S.
- Resting place: Orangeburg, South Carolina
- Party: Democratic
- Spouse: Willa L. Fulmer (m. 1901)
- Education: Massey Business College
- Profession: Farmer, businessman

Hampton Pitts Fulmer (June 23, 1875 – October 19, 1944) was an American politician of the Democratic Party. He represented South Carolina in the United States House of Representatives from 1921 – October 19, 1944. After his death, his wife Willa L. Fulmer took over his seat.

== Early life and education ==
Fulmer was born near Springfield, South Carolina on June 23, 1875. He attended the public schools and was graduated from Massey Business College in Columbus, Georgia in 1897. He engaged in agricultural and mercantile pursuits in Norway, South Carolina, and also engaged in banking.

He married Willa E. Lybrand in 1901, and they had three children.

== Political career ==
Fulmer was a member of the South Carolina House of Representatives 1917–1920. He was elected as a Democrat to the Sixty-seventh and to the eleven succeeding Congresses and served from March 4, 1921, until his death. While in Congress, he served as chairman, Committee on Agriculture (Seventy-sixth through Seventy-eighth Congresses). He had been nominated for re-election to the Seventy-ninth Congress before dying in Washington, D.C., October 19, 1944.

During World War II but before Pearl Harbor Fullmer was outspokenly pro-British, and he advocated providing Britain with military aid in their war against Nazi Germany. Fulmer also advocated American entry into the war. In 1941 he voted in favor of the 1941 Lend Lease Act. Fulmer was buried in Memorial Park Cemetery, Orangeburg, South Carolina.

== See also ==
- List of members of the United States Congress who died in office (1900–1949)

U.S. House of Representatives
| Preceded by Edward C. Mann | Member of the U.S. House of Representatives from South Carolina's 7th congressional district 1921–1933 | Succeeded by Constituency abolished Tom Rice after constituency reestablished in 2013 |
| Preceded by Butler B. Hare | Member of the U.S. House of Representatives from South Carolina's 2nd congressional district 1933–1944 | Succeeded by Willa L. Fulmer |
| Preceded by Marvin Jones | Chairman of the House Agriculture Committee; 1941–1944 | Succeeded by John W. Flannagan, Jr. |
