= South Carolina's congressional districts =

U.S. House districts in the state of South Carolina

Map of South Carolina's congressional districts from 2023 Interactive map version

There are currently seven United States congressional districts in South Carolina. There have been as few as four and as many as nine congressional districts in South Carolina. The 9th district and the 8th district were lost after the 1840 census. The 5th district and the 6th district were also briefly lost after the Civil War, but both had been regained by the 1880 census. Because of the state population growth in the 2010 census, South Carolina regained its 7th district, which had remained unused since the Civil War.

On January 6, 2023, a three-judge panel from the U.S. District Court for the District of South Carolina ruled that the current 1st district lines were unconstitutional due to racial gerrymandering and would have to be redrawn April of that year. The case, Alexander v. South Carolina State Conference of the NAACP, was argued on October 11, 2023, in the Supreme Court. On March 28, 2024, the same district court that ruled the current 1st district lines unconstitutional, allowed for its use in the 2024 elections. It concluded that it would be impractical to create a new district map at the current time, mainly due to the upcoming military and overseas ballot mailing deadline of April 27 and statewide primaries on June 11. However, it still found the 1st district to be in violation of the 14th amendment and believed future litigation is possible after the 2024 elections.

On May 23, 2024, the Supreme Court—in a 6–3 decision—ruled the 1st district lines were constitutional, reversing the District of South Carolina's original ruling and officially allowing the current congressional map to be used for and past the 2024 elections. It also remanded the case back to the district court to rehear other claims made by the defendants.

== Current districts and representatives ==
This is a list of United States representatives from South Carolina, their terms, their district boundaries, and the district political ratings according to the CPVI. The delegation has 7 members, including 6 Republicans and 1 Democrat as of 2023.

Current U.S. representatives from South Carolina
| District | Member (Residence) | Party | Incumbent since | CPVI (2025) | District map |
|---|---|---|---|---|---|
| 1st | Nancy Mace (Charleston) | Republican | January 3, 2021 | R+6 | |
| 2nd | Joe Wilson (Springdale) | Republican | December 18, 2001 | R+7 | |
| 3rd | Sheri Biggs (Salem) | Republican | January 3, 2025 | R+21 | |
| 4th | William Timmons (Greenville) | Republican | January 3, 2019 | R+12 | |
| 5th | Ralph Norman (Rock Hill) | Republican | June 20, 2017 | R+11 | |
| 6th | Jim Clyburn (Columbia) | Democratic | January 3, 1993 | D+13 | |
| 7th | Russell Fry (Murrells Inlet) | Republican | January 3, 2023 | R+12 | |

== Historical results ==
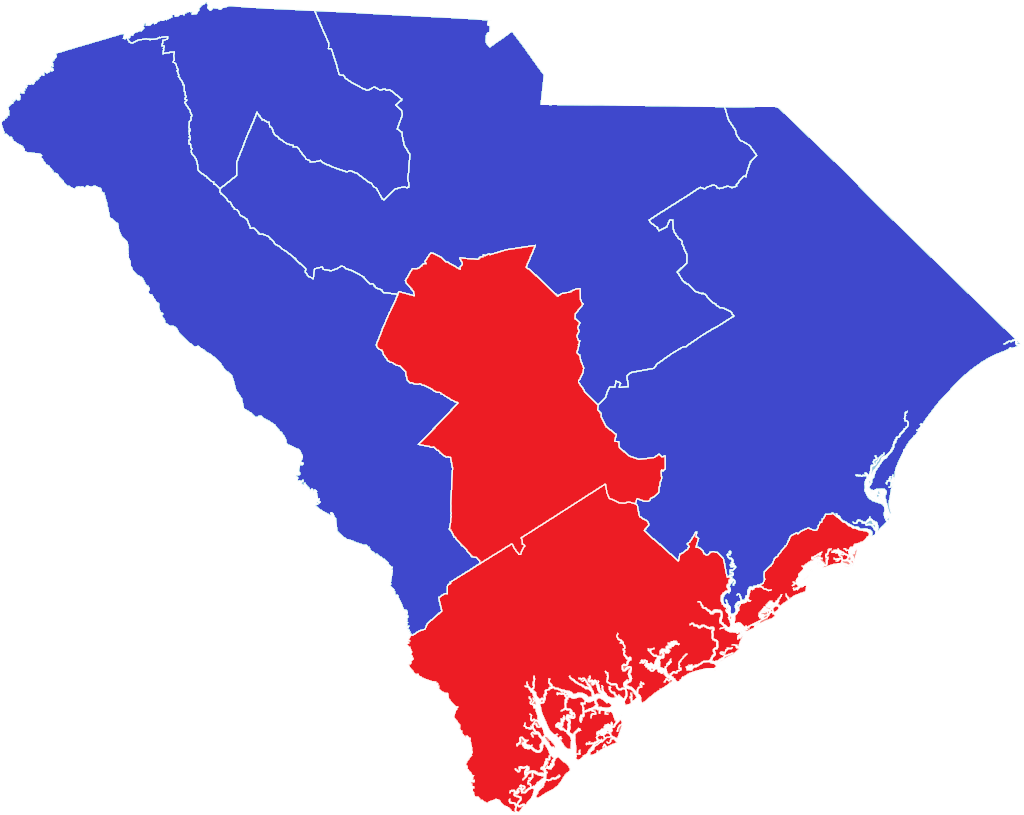
1986

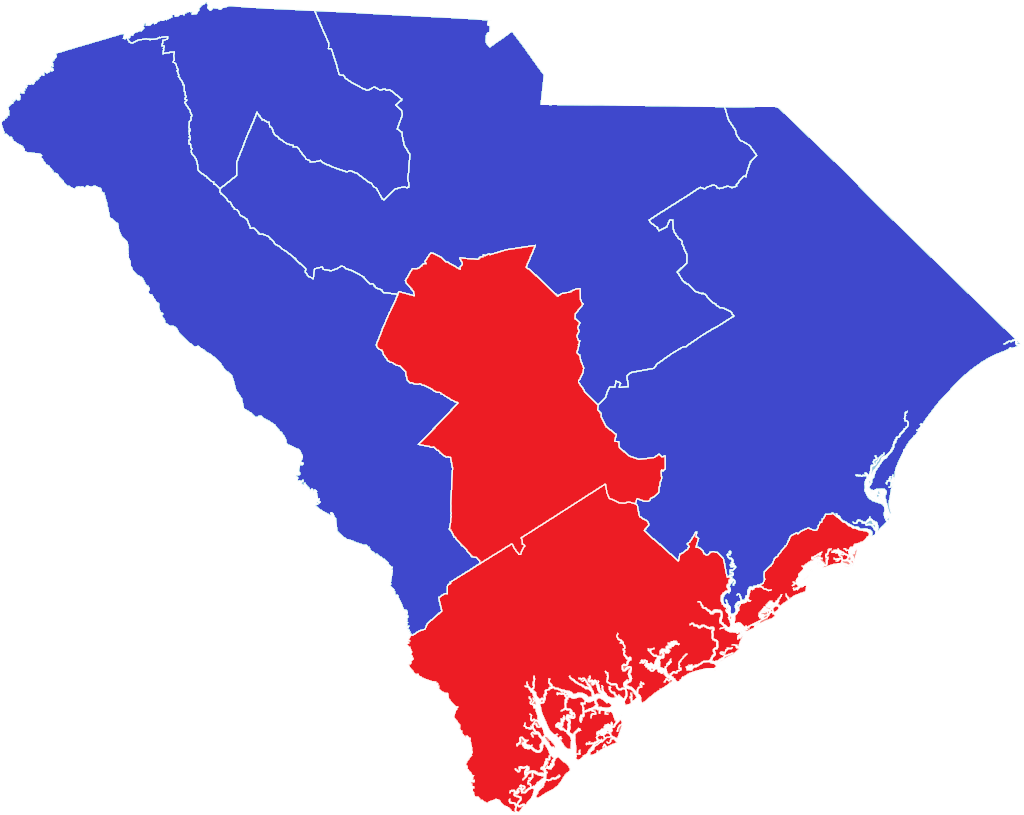
1988

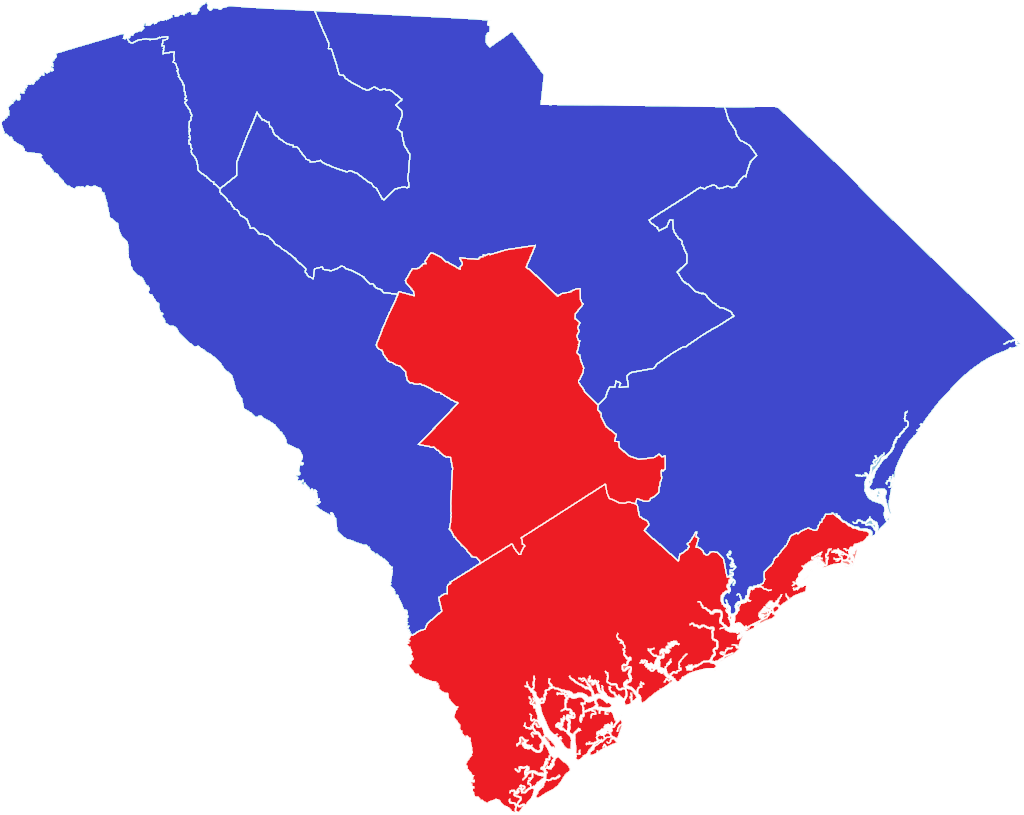
1990

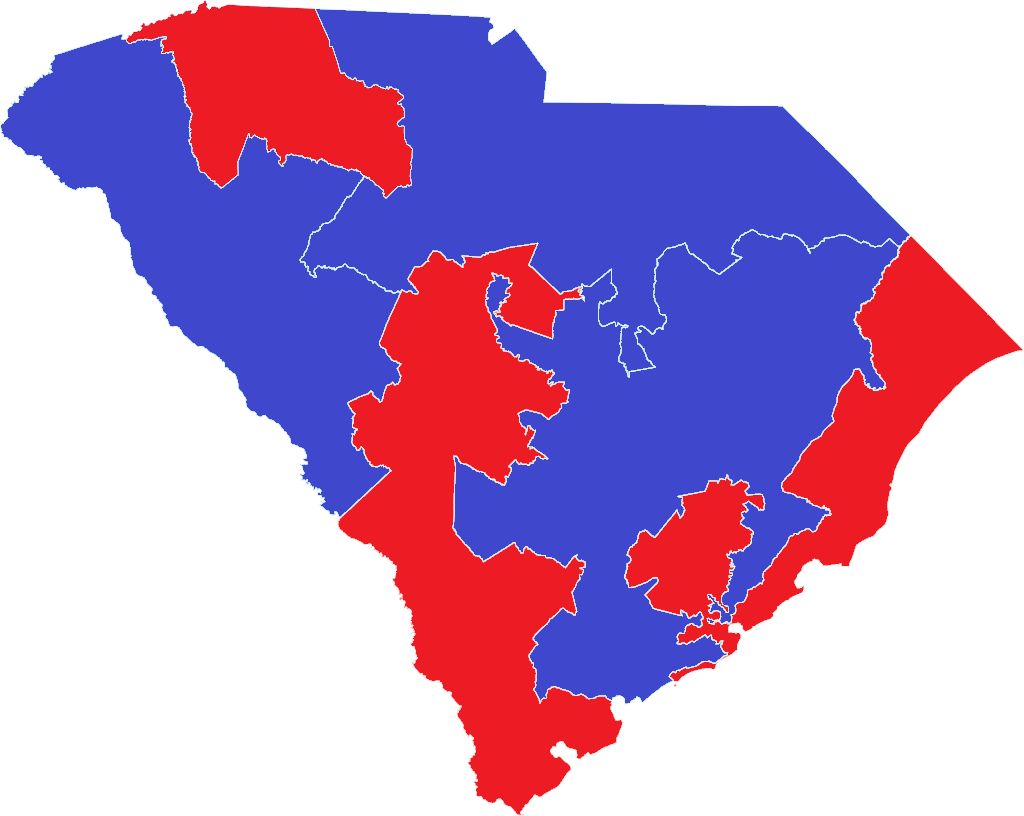
1992

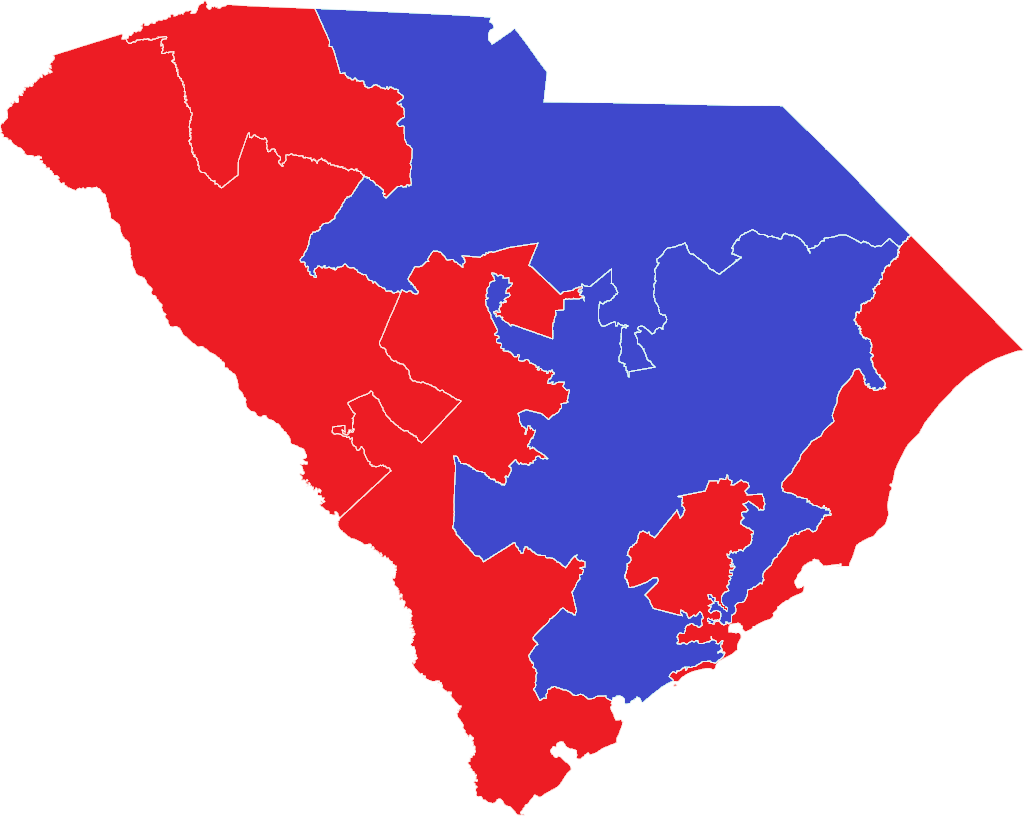
1994

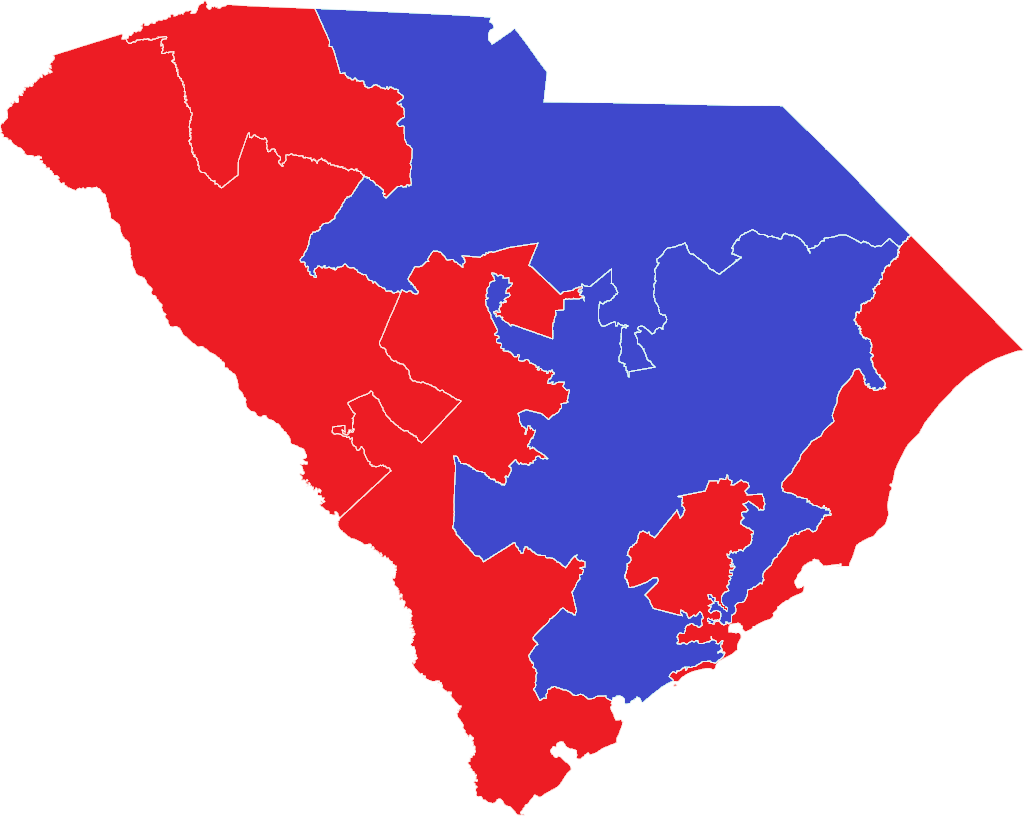
1996

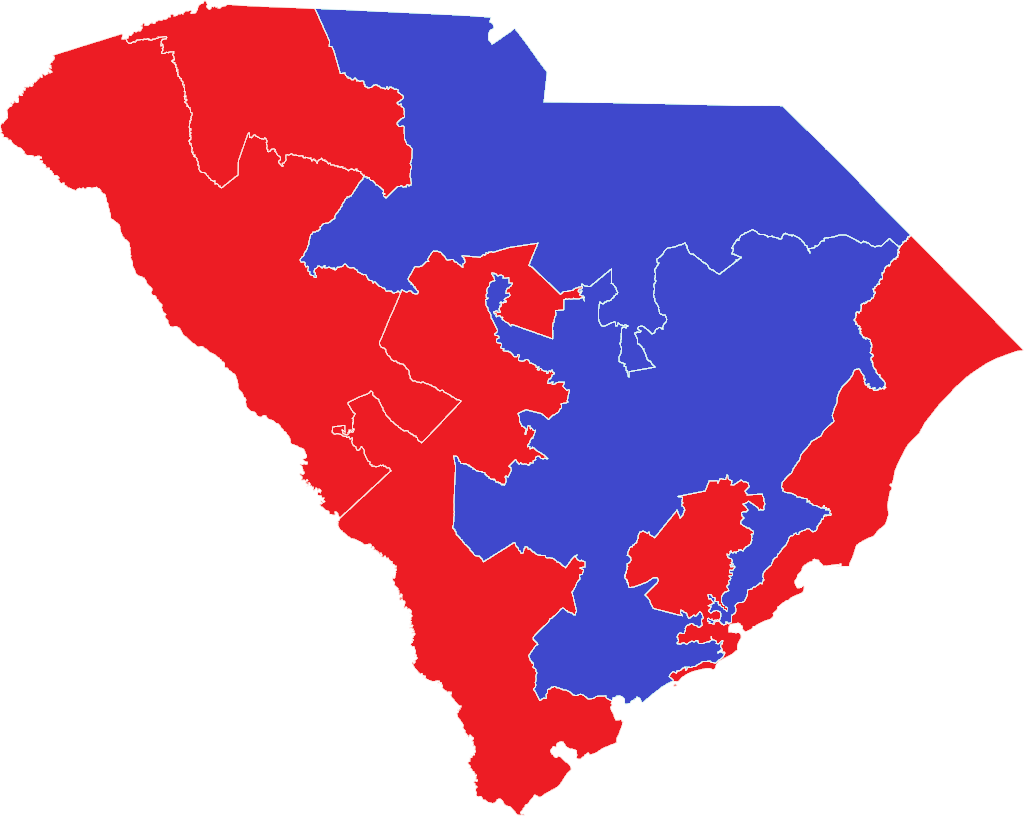
1998

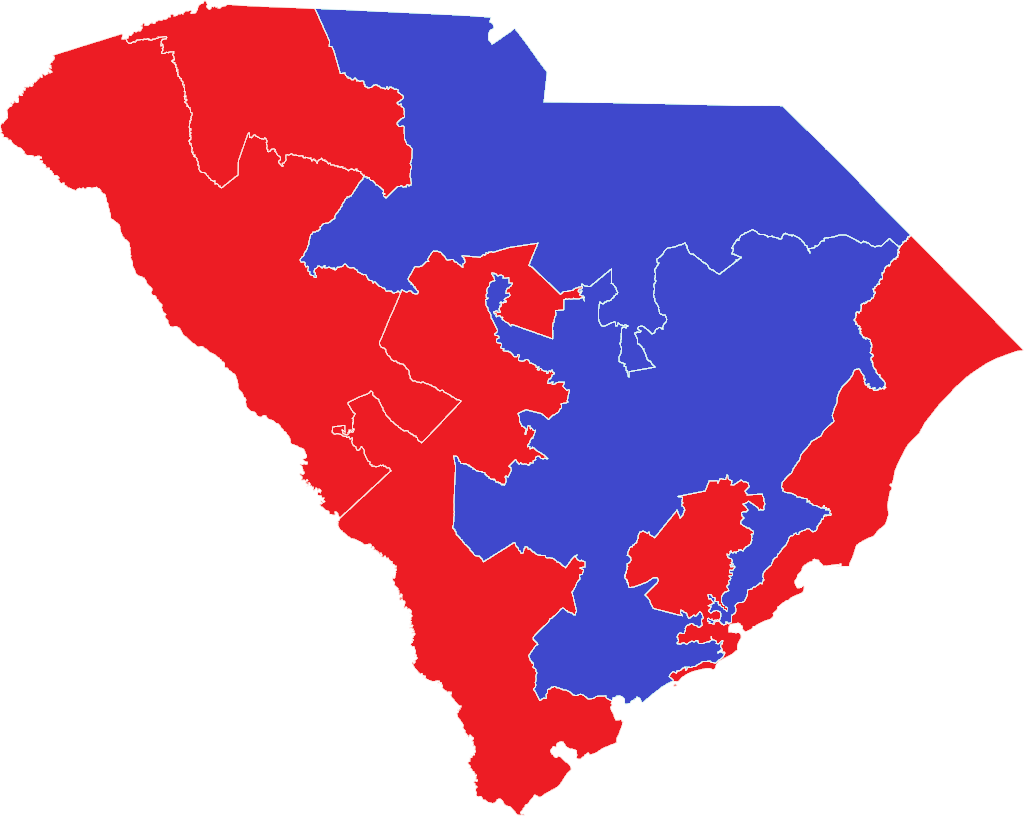
2000

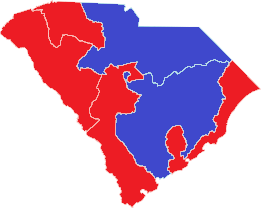
2002

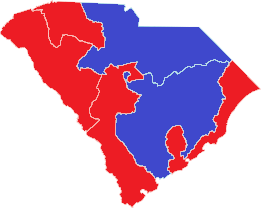
2004

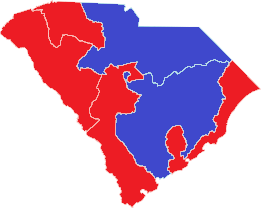
2006

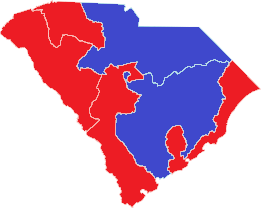
2008

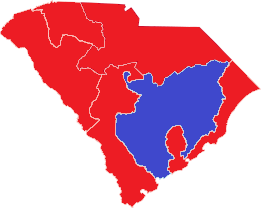
2010

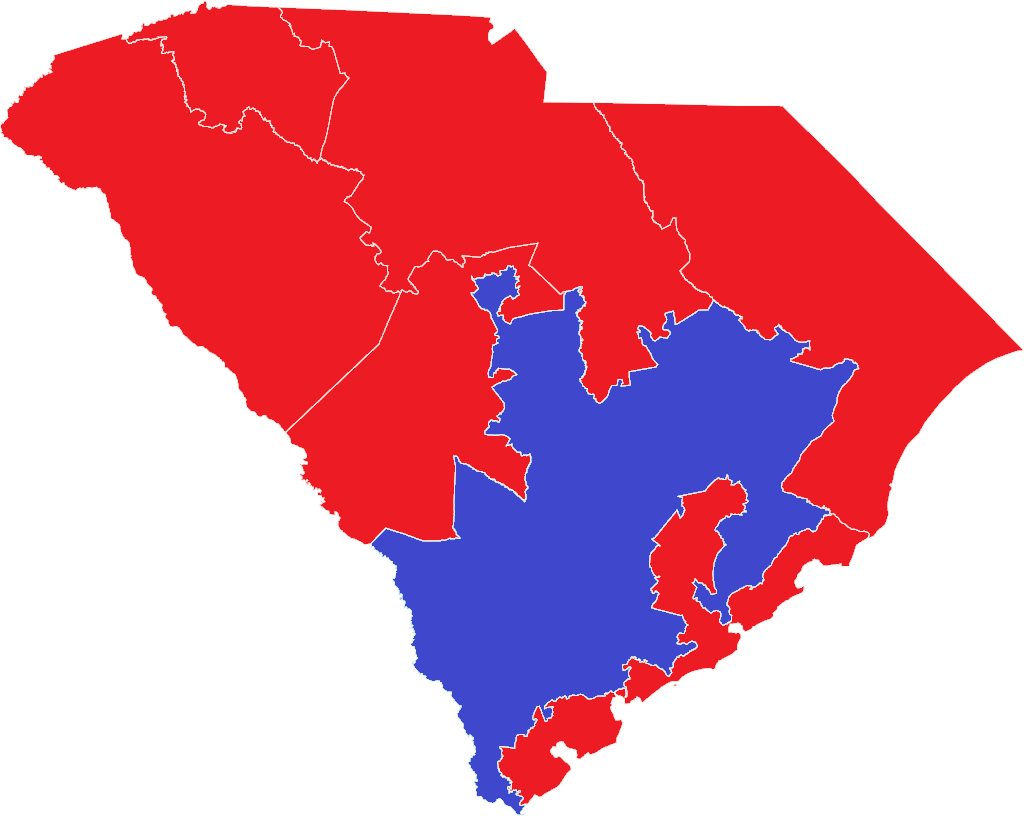
2012

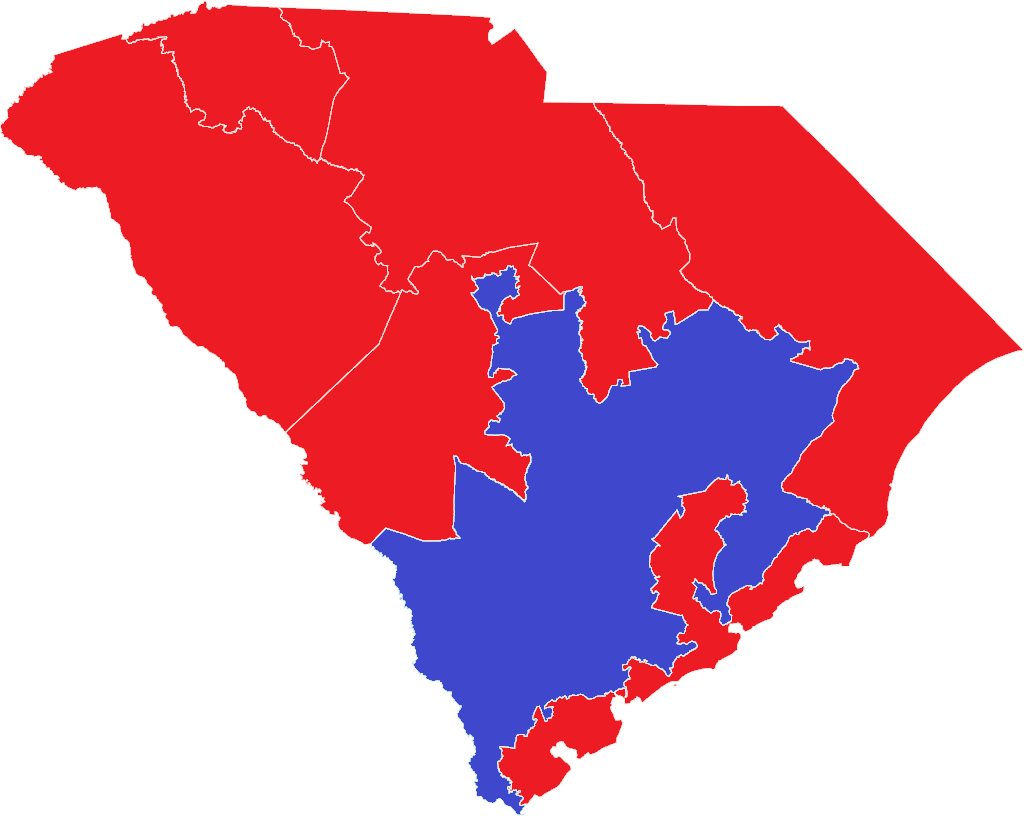
2014

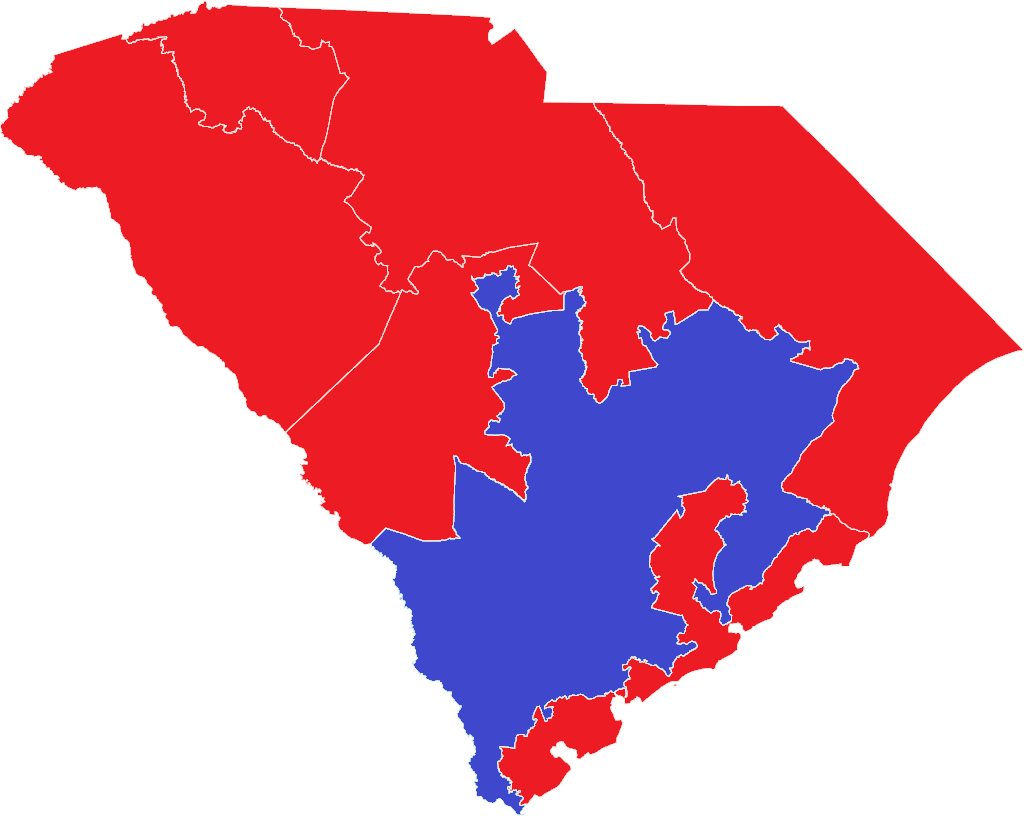
2016

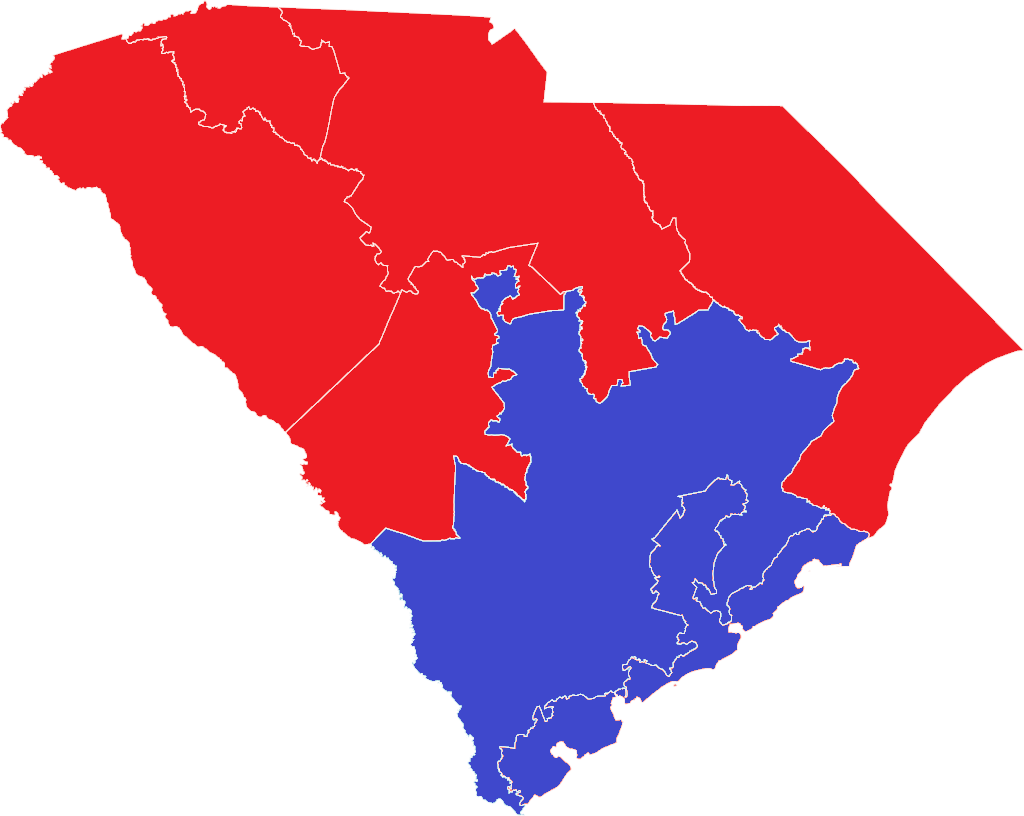
2018

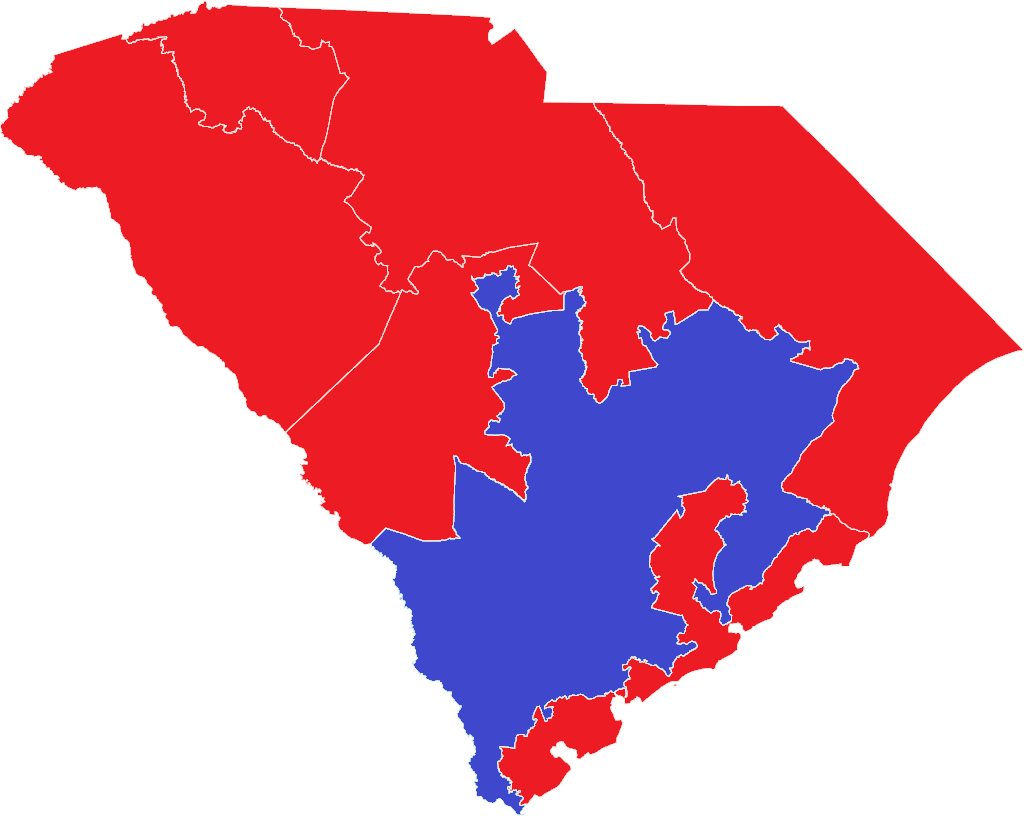
2020

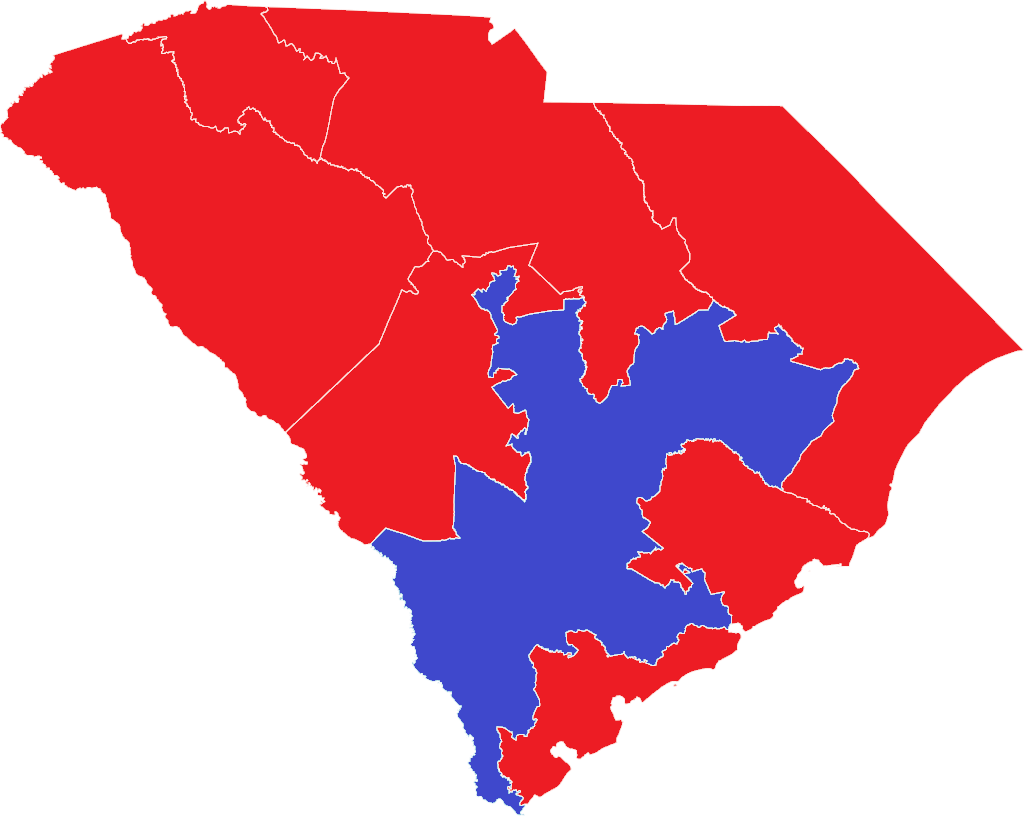
2022

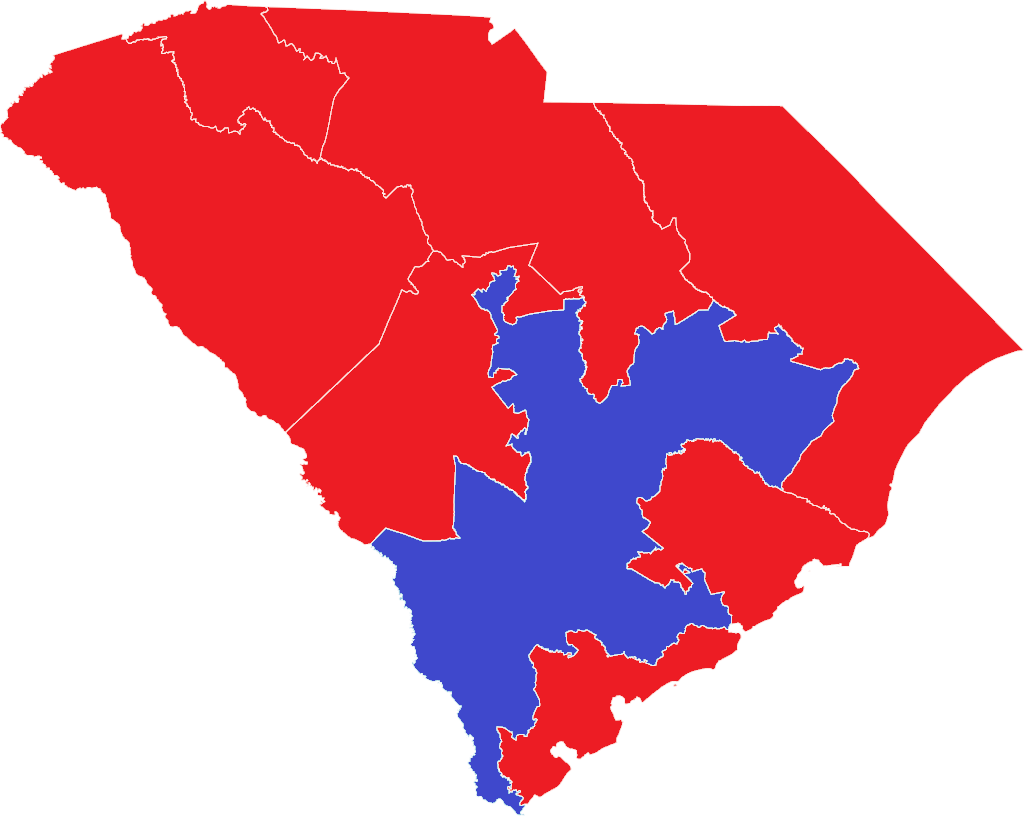
2024

== District cities and counties ==
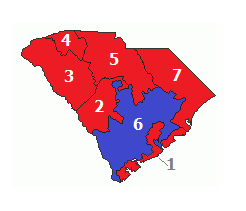
2020 election results, showing partisan membership

=== First congressional district ===
==== Counties ====
- Beaufort County
- Berkeley County
- Charleston County (part)
- Colleton County (part)
- Dorchester County (part)
- Jasper County (part)

=== Second congressional district ===
==== Counties ====
- Aiken County
- Barnwell County
- Lexington County
- Orangeburg County (part)
- Richland County (part)

=== Third congressional district ===
==== Counties ====
- Abbeville County
- Anderson County
- Edgefield County
- Greenville County (part)
- Greenwood County
- Laurens County
- McCormick County
- Newberry County
- Oconee County
- Pickens County
- Saluda County

=== Fourth congressional district ===
==== Counties ====
- Greenville County (part)
- Spartanburg County (part)

District contains the two major cities of Greenville and Spartanburg.

=== Fifth congressional district ===
==== Counties ====
- Cherokee County
- Chester County
- Fairfield County
- Kershaw County
- Lancaster County
- Lee County
- Spartanburg County (part)
- Sumter County (part)
- Union County
- York County

=== Sixth congressional district ===
==== Counties ====
- Allendale County
- Bamberg County
- Calhoun County
- Charleston County (part)
- Clarendon County
- Colleton County (part)
- Dorchester County (part)
- Florence County (part)
- Hampton County
- Jasper County (part)
- Orangeburg County (part)
- Richland County (part)
- Sumter County (part)
- Williamsburg County

=== Seventh congressional district ===
==== Counties ====
- Chesterfield County
- Darlington County
- Dillon County
- Florence County (part)
- Georgetown County
- Horry County
- Marion County
- Marlboro County

== Historical and present district boundaries ==
Table of United States congressional district boundary maps in the State of South Carolina, presented chronologically. All redistricting events that took place in South Carolina between 1973 and 2013 are shown.

| Year | Statewide map | Charleston highlight |
|---|---|---|
| 1973–1982 | | |
| 1983–1992 | | |
| 1993–2002 | | |
| 2003–2013 | | |
| 2013–2023 | | |
| Since 2023 | | |

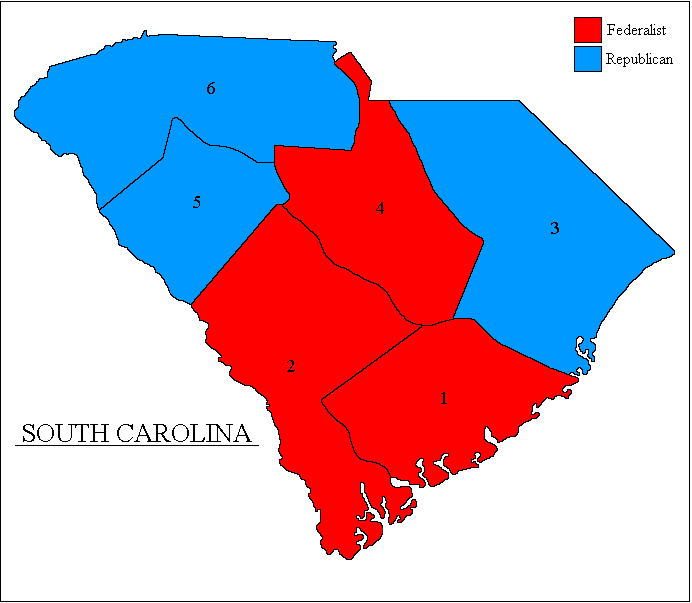
Districts from 1793 to 1803

== Obsolete districts ==
=== Eighth congressional district ===
The eighth congressional district seat was eliminated after the 1840 census.

=== Ninth congressional district ===
The ninth congressional district seat was eliminated after the 1840 census.

== See also ==
- List of United States congressional districts
- South Carolina Democratic Party
- South Carolina Republican Party
- South Carolina's congressional delegations
