= 1980 United States House of Representatives elections in South Carolina =

- November 4, 1980

All 6 South Carolina seats to the United States House of Representatives
	Majority party	Minority party
Party	Republican	Democratic
Last election	2	4
Seats won	4	2
Seat change	▲2	▼2
District results
Republican
50–60%
90–100%
Democratic
50–60%
80–90%

The 1980 United States House of Representatives elections in South Carolina were held on November 4, 1980, to select six Representatives for two-year terms from the state of South Carolina. The primary elections for the Democrats and the Republicans were held on June 10 and the runoff elections were held two weeks later on June 24. Three incumbents were re-elected, but John Jenrette of the 6th congressional district was defeated in his bid for re-election and the open seat in the 1st congressional district was taken by the Republicans from the Democrats. The composition of the state delegation after the elections was four Republicans and two Democrats.

== 1st congressional district ==
Incumbent Democratic Congressman Mendel Jackson Davis of the 1st congressional district, in office since 1971, opted to retire. Tommy Hartnett, a Republican state senator from Charleston, defeated Thomas G. Moore in the Republican primary and Democrat Charles D. Ravenel in the general election.

=== Democratic primary ===
Democratic primary
Candidate	Votes	%
Charles D. Ravenel	30,966	55.6
Wheeler Tillman	17,070	30.7
Charles B. Brassell	3,838	6.9
Benjamin Frazier, Jr.	3,786	6.8

=== Republican primary ===
Republican primary
Candidate	Votes	%
Thomas F. Hartnett	10,510	75.4
Thomas G. Moore	3,428	24.6

=== General election results ===
South Carolina's 1st congressional district election results, 1980
Party	Candidate	Votes	%	±%
Republican	Thomas F. Hartnett	81,988	51.6	+12.2
Democratic	Charles D. Ravenel	76,963	48.4	−12.2
No party	Write-Ins	10	0.0	0.0
Majority		5,025	3.2	−18.0
Turnout		158,961		
Republican gain from Democratic				

== 2nd congressional district ==
Incumbent Republican Congressman Floyd Spence of the 2nd congressional district, in office since 1971, defeated Democratic challenger Tom Turnipseed.

=== Democratic primary ===
Democratic primary
Candidate	Votes	%
Tom Turnipseed	28,490	71.6
Leigh J. Leventis	11,303	28.4

=== General election results ===
South Carolina's 2nd congressional district election results, 1980
Party	Candidate	Votes	%	±%
Republican	Floyd Spence (incumbent)	92,306	55.7	−1.6
Democratic	Tom Turnipseed	73,353	44.3	+1.6
No party	Write-Ins	19	0.0	0.0
Majority		18,953	11.4	−3.2
Turnout		165,678		
Republican hold				

== 3rd congressional district ==
Incumbent Democratic Congressman Butler Derrick of the 3rd congressional district, in office since 1975, defeated Republican challenger Marshall Parker.

=== General election results ===
South Carolina's 3rd congressional district election results, 1980
Party	Candidate	Votes	%	±%
Democratic	Butler Derrick (incumbent)	87,680	59.8	−22.1
Republican	Marshall Parker	57,840	39.4	+21.3
Libertarian	Boyce Lee Muller	1,118	0.8	+0.8
No party	Write-Ins	4	0.0	0.0
Majority		29,840	20.4	−43.4
Turnout		146,642		
Democratic hold				

== 4th congressional district ==
Incumbent Republican Congressman Carroll A. Campbell, Jr. of the 4th congressional district, in office since 1979, defeated Libertarian challenger Thomas P. Waldenfels.

=== General election results ===
South Carolina's 4th congressional district election results, 1980
Party	Candidate	Votes	%	±%
Republican	Carroll Campbell (incumbent)	90,941	92.6	+40.5
Libertarian	Thomas P. Waldenfels	6,984	7.1	+7.1
No party	Write-Ins	248	0.3	+0.3
Majority		83,957	85.5	+79.6
Turnout		98,173		
Republican hold				

== 5th congressional district ==
Incumbent Democratic Congressman Kenneth Lamar Holland of the 5th congressional district, in office since 1975, defeated Libertarian challenger Thomas Campbell.

=== General election results ===
South Carolina's 5th congressional district election results, 1980
Party	Candidate	Votes	%	±%
Democratic	Ken Holland (incumbent)	99,773	87.5	+4.9
Libertarian	Thomas Campbell	14,252	12.5	+12.5
No party	Write-Ins	13	0.0	−0.2
Majority		85,521	75.0	−9.6
Turnout		114,038		
Democratic hold				

== 6th congressional district ==
Incumbent Democratic Congressman John Jenrette of the 6th congressional district, in office since 1975, was defeated in his bid for re-election by Republican John Light Napier.

=== Democratic primary ===
Democratic primary
Candidate	Votes	%
John Jenrette	38,565	45.3
Hicks Harwell	22,251	26.2
John W. Brassington	11,346	13.3
Erick B. Ficken	8,061	9.5
William T. McElveen, Sr.	4,887	5.7

Democratic primary runoff
Candidate	Votes	%	±%
John Jenrette	42,759	52.5	+7.3
Hicks Harwell	38,621	47.5	+21.3

=== Republican primary ===
Republican primary
Candidate	Votes	%
John Light Napier	3,735	60.0
Edward Lunn Young	2,491	40.0

=== General election results ===
South Carolina's 6th congressional district election results, 1980
Party	Candidate	Votes	%	±%
Republican	John Light Napier	75,635	51.7	+51.7
Democratic	John Jenrette (incumbent)	70,445	48.2	−51.5
No party	Write-Ins	86	0.1	−0.2
Majority		5,190	3.5	−95.9
Turnout		146,166		
Republican gain from Democratic				

== See also ==
- United States House elections, 1980
- United States Senate election in South Carolina, 1980
- South Carolina's congressional districts
