= 1972 United States House of Representatives elections in South Carolina =

- November 7, 1972

All 6 South Carolina seats to the United States House of Representatives
	Majority party	Minority party
Party	Democratic	Republican
Last election	5	1
Seats won	4	2
Seat change	▼1	▲1
Popular vote	328,860	301,695
Percentage	52.15%	47.84%
Swing	▼20.34%	▲20.78%
District results
Democratic
50–60%
60–70%
70–80%
Republican
50–60%
90–100%

The 1972 United States House of Representatives elections in South Carolina were held on November 7, 1972, to select six representatives for two-year terms from the state of South Carolina. The primary elections were held on August 29 and the runoff elections were held two weeks later on September 12. Five incumbents were re-elected, and the only change was in the 6th district where Republican Edward Lunn Young succeeded Democrat John L. McMillan, who was defeated in the Democratic primary. The composition of the state delegation after the elections was four Democrats and two Republicans.

== 1st congressional district ==
Incumbent Democratic Congressman Mendel Jackson Davis of the 1st congressional district, in office since 1971, won the Democratic primary and defeated Republican Sidi Limehouse in the general election.

=== Democratic primary ===
Democratic primary
Candidate	Votes	%
Mendel Jackson Davis	37,493	72.3
Benjamin Frasier	11,247	21.7
Milton L. Dukes	3,093	6.0

=== General election results ===
South Carolina's 1st congressional district election results, 1972
Party	Candidate	Votes	%	±%
Democratic	Mendel J. Davis (incumbent)	61,376	54.3	+6.0
Republican	Sidi Limehouse	51,728	45.7	+4.3
Majority		9,648	8.6	+1.7
Turnout		113,104		
Democratic hold				

== 2nd congressional district ==
Incumbent Republican Congressman Floyd Spence of the 2nd congressional district, in office since 1971, was unopposed in his bid for re-election.

=== General election results ===
South Carolina's 2nd congressional district election results, 1972
Party	Candidate	Votes	%	±%
Republican	Floyd Spence (incumbent)	79,667	100.0	+46.9
Majority		79,667	100.0	+93.3
Turnout		79,667		
Republican hold				

== 3rd congressional district ==
Incumbent Democratic Congressman William Jennings Bryan Dorn of the 3rd congressional district, in office since 1951, defeated Republican challenger Ray Ethridge.

=== General election results ===
South Carolina's 3rd congressional district election results, 1972
Party	Candidate	Votes	%	±%
Democratic	William J.B. Dorn (incumbent)	82,579	75.2	0.0
Republican	Ray Ethridge	27,173	24.8	0.0
Majority		55,406	50.4	0.0
Turnout		109,752		
Democratic hold				

== 4th congressional district ==
Incumbent Democratic Congressman James R. Mann of the 4th congressional district, in office since 1969, defeated Republican challenger Wayne N. Whatley.

=== General election results ===
South Carolina's 4th congressional district election results, 1972
Party	Candidate	Votes	%	±%
Democratic	James R. Mann (incumbent)	64,989	66.1	−33.9
Republican	Wayne N. Whatley	33,363	33.9	+33.9
Majority		31,626	32.2	−67.8
Turnout		98,352		
Democratic hold				

== 5th congressional district ==
Incumbent Democratic Congressman Thomas S. Gettys of the 5th congressional district, in office since 1964, defeated Republican challenger B. Leonard Phillips.

=== General election results ===
South Carolina's 5th congressional district election results, 1972
Party	Candidate	Votes	%	±%
Democratic	Thomas S. Gettys (incumbent)	66,343	60.9	−5.0
Republican	B. Leonard Phillips	42,620	39.1	+6.0
Majority		23,723	21.8	−11.0
Turnout		108,963		
Democratic hold				

== 6th congressional district ==
Incumbent Democratic Congressman John L. McMillan of the 6th congressional district, in office since 1939, was defeated in the Democratic primary. Republican Edward Lunn Young defeated Democrat John Jenrette in the general election.

=== Democratic primary ===
Democratic primary
Candidate	Votes	%
John L. McMillan	38,542	43.9
John Jenrette	25,730	29.3
Bill R. Craig	23,476	26.8

Democratic primary runoff
Candidate	Votes	%	±%
John Jenrette	36,057	50.6	+21.3
John L. McMillan	35,212	49.4	+5.5

=== General election results ===
South Carolina's 6th congressional district election results, 1972
Party	Candidate	Votes	%	±%
Republican	Edward Lunn Young	60,766	53.4	+18.5
Democratic	John Jenrette	53,085	46.6	−17.5
Majority		7,681	6.8	−22.4
Turnout		113,851		
Republican gain from Democratic				

== See also ==
- United States House elections, 1972
- United States Senate election in South Carolina, 1972
- South Carolina's congressional districts
