= 1974 United States House of Representatives elections in South Carolina =

- November 5, 1974

All 6 South Carolina seats to the United States House of Representatives
	Majority party	Minority party
Party	Democratic	Republican
Last election	4	2
Seats won	5	1
Seat change	▲1	▼1
District results
Democratic
50–60%
60–70%
70–80%
Republican
50–60%

The 1974 United States House of Representatives elections in South Carolina were held on November 5, 1974, to select six Representatives for two-year terms from the state of South Carolina. The primary elections were held on July 16 and the runoff elections were held two weeks later on July 30. Three incumbents were re-elected, Democrat John Jenrette defeated incumbent Republican Edward Lunn Young in the 6th district and the two open seats in the 3rd and 5th districts were retained by the Democrats. The composition of the state delegation after the elections was five Democrats and one Republican.

== 1st congressional district ==
1974 South Carolina's 1st congressional district election
- November 5th, 1974
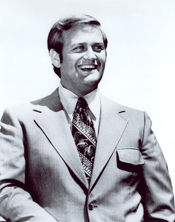
Nominee	Mendel J. Davis	George B. Rast
Party	Democratic	Republican
Popular vote	60,142	22,000
Percentage	72.2%	26.4%
- County results Davis: 70–80% 80–90%
U.S. Representative before election
Mendel J. Davis
Democratic
Elected U.S. Representative
Mendel J. Davis
Democratic

Incumbent Democratic Congressman Mendel Jackson Davis of the 1st congressional district, in office since 1971, defeated Republican challenger George B. Rast.

=== General election results ===
South Carolina's 1st congressional district election results, 1974
Party	Candidate	Votes	%	±%
Democratic	Mendel J. Davis (incumbent)	60,142	72.2	+17.9
Republican	George B. Rast	22,000	26.4	−19.3
Independent	Charles Amaker	673	0.8	+0.8
United Citizens Party	Benjamin Frasier, Jr.	509	0.6	+0.6
Majority		38,142	45.8	+37.2
Turnout		83,324		
Democratic hold				

== 2nd congressional district ==
1974 South Carolina's 2nd congressional district election
- November 5th, 1974
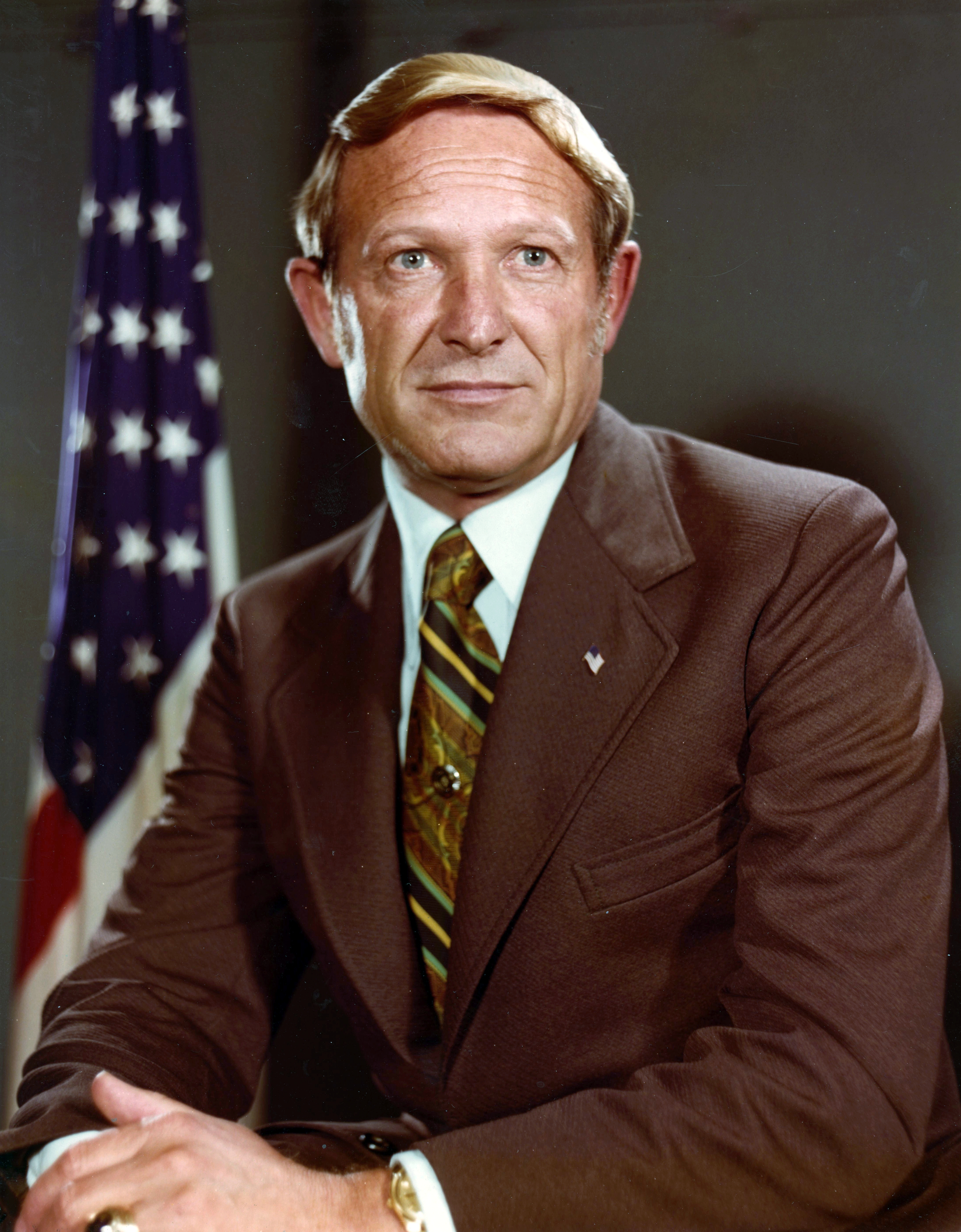
Nominee	Floyd Spence	Matthew J. Perry
Party	Republican	Democratic
Popular vote	58,936	45,205
Percentage	56.1%	43.0%
- County results Spence: 50–60% 70–80% Perry: 50–60% 60–70%
U.S. Representative before election
Floyd Spence
Republican
Elected U.S. Representative
Floyd Spence
Republican

Incumbent Republican Congressman Floyd Spence of the 2nd congressional district, in office since 1971, defeated Democratic challenger Matthew J. Perry.

=== Democratic primary ===
Democratic primary
Candidate	Votes	%
Matthew J. Perry	31,360	57.5
Cole Blease Graham	23,189	42.5

=== General election results ===
South Carolina's 2nd congressional district election results, 1974
Party	Candidate	Votes	%	±%
Republican	Floyd Spence (incumbent)	58,936	56.1	−43.9
Democratic	Matthew J. Perry	45,205	43.0	+43.0
Independent	Paul Proveaux	950	0.9	+0.9
Majority		13,731	13.1	−86.9
Turnout		105,091		
Republican hold				

== 3rd congressional district ==
1974 South Carolina's 3rd congressional district election
- November 5th, 1974
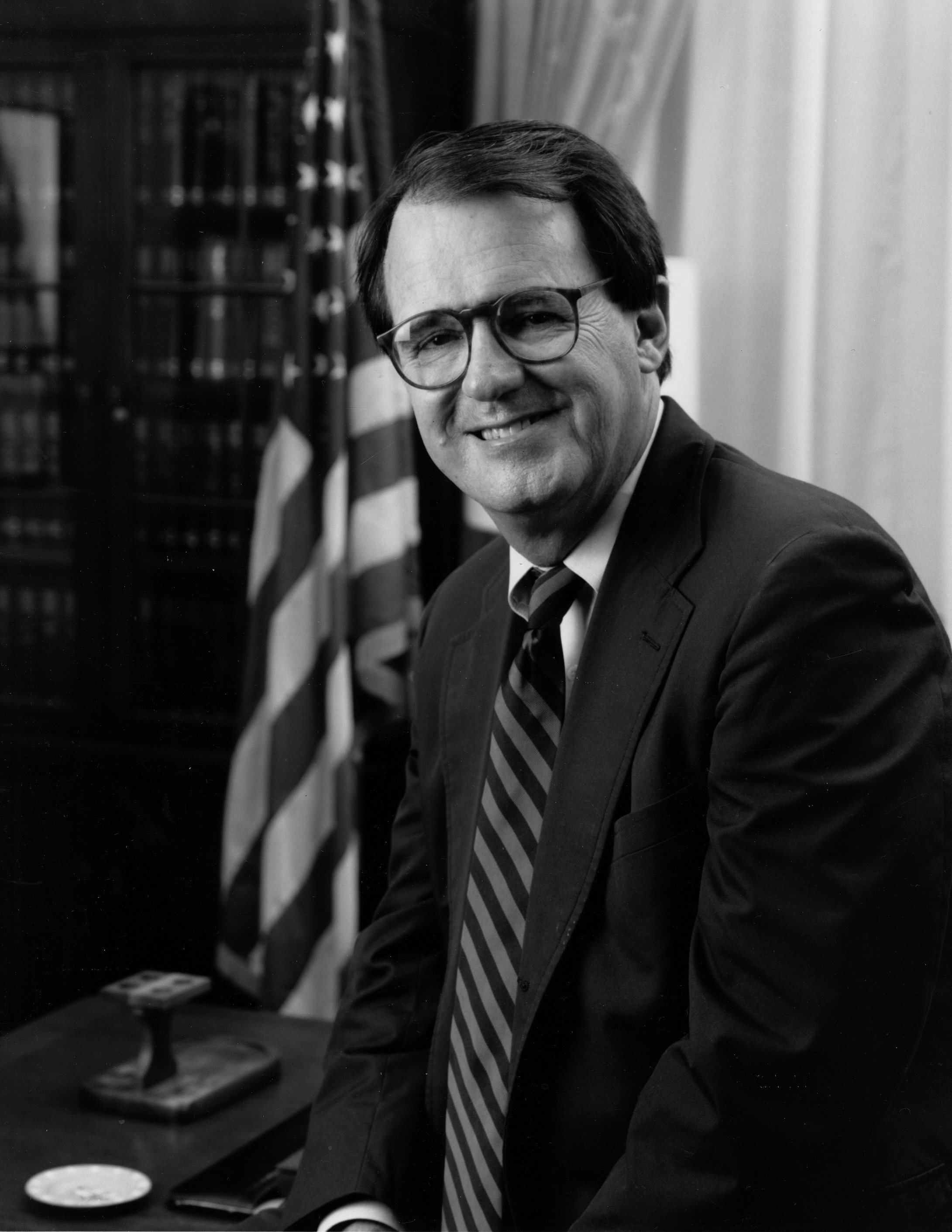
Nominee	Butler Derrick	Marshall Parker
Party	Democratic	Republican
Popular vote	55,120	34,036
Percentage	61.8%	38.2%
- County results Mace: 50–60% 60–70% 70–80% 80–90% Mace: 50–60%
U.S. Representative before election
Butler Derrick
Democratic
Elected U.S. Representative
Butler Derrick
Democratic

Incumbent Democratic Congressman William Jennings Bryan Dorn of the 3rd congressional district, in office since 1951, chose to not seek re-election and instead made an unsuccessful run for governor. Butler Derrick won the Democratic primary and defeated Republican Marshall Parker in the general election.

=== Democratic primary ===
Democratic primary
Candidate	Votes	%
Butler Derrick	36,501	64.7
Jack M. McIntosh	13,751	24.4
George M. Jones	6,138	10.9

=== General election results ===
South Carolina's 3rd congressional district election results, 1974
Party	Candidate	Votes	%	±%
Democratic	Butler Derrick	55,120	61.8	−13.4
Republican	Marshall Parker	34,036	38.2	+13.4
Majority		21,084	23.6	−26.8
Turnout		89,156		
Democratic hold				

== 4th congressional district ==
1974 South Carolina's 4th congressional district election
- November 5th, 1974
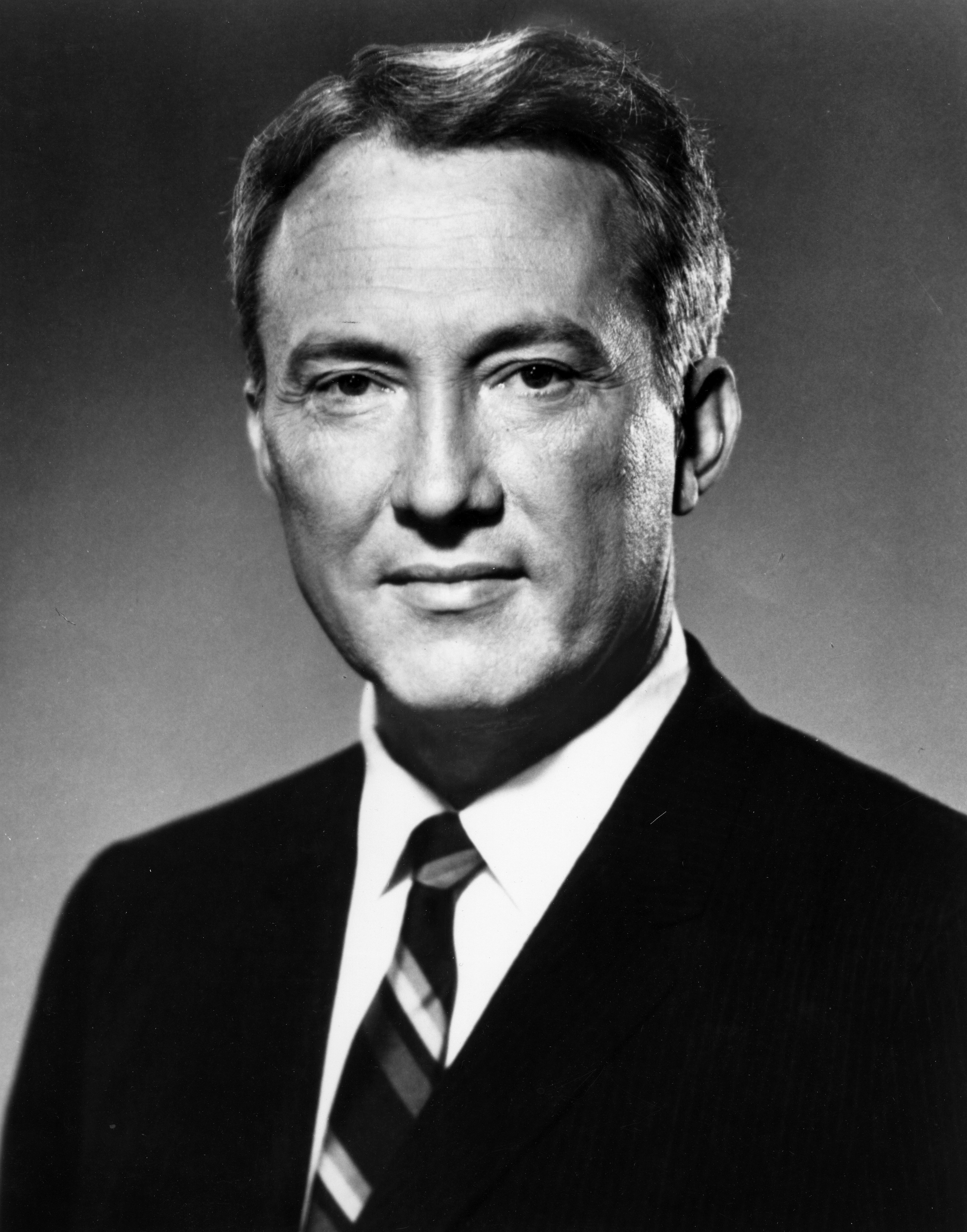
Nominee	James R. Mann	Robert Watkins
Party	Democratic	Republican
Popular vote	45,070	26,193
Percentage	63.2%	36.8%
- County results Mann: 60–70%
U.S. Representative before election
James R. Mann
Democratic
Elected U.S. Representative
James R. Mann
Democratic

Incumbent Democratic Congressman James R. Mann of the 4th congressional district, in office since 1969, defeated Republican challenger Robert L. Watkins.

=== General election results ===
South Carolina's 4th congressional district election results, 1974
Party	Candidate	Votes	%	±%
Democratic	James R. Mann (incumbent)	45,070	63.2	−2.9
Republican	Robert L. Watkins	26,193	36.8	+2.9
Majority		18,877	26.4	−5.8
Turnout		71,263		
Democratic hold				

== 5th congressional district ==
1974 South Carolina's 5th congressional district election
- November 5th, 1974
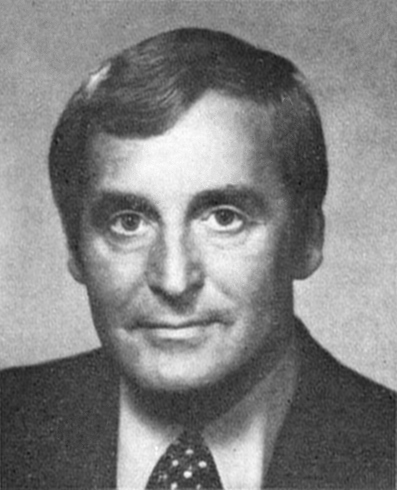
Nominee	Kenneth Lamar Holland	B. Len Phillips
Party	Democratic	Republican
Popular vote	47,617	29,294
Percentage	61.4 %	37.8%
- County results Holland: 50–60% 60–70% 70–80%
U.S. Representative before election
Kenneth Lamar Holland
Democratic
Elected U.S. Representative
Kenneth Lamar Holland
Democratic

Incumbent Democratic Congressman Thomas S. Gettys of the 5th congressional district, in office since 1964, opted to retire. Kenneth Lamar Holland won the Democratic primary and defeated Republican B. Len Phillips in the general election.

=== Democratic primary ===
Democratic primary
Candidate	Votes	%
Kenneth Lamar Holland	20,176	31.5
Frank Roddey	17,051	26.7
John Justice	11,406	17.8
Robert H. Moore	5,848	9.1
E.M. Watt	3,631	5.7
Howard J. Parnell	3,244	5.1
William S. Holler	2,648	4.1

Democratic primary runoff
Candidate	Votes	%	±%
Kenneth Lamar Holland	32,549	52.2	+20.7
Frank Roddey	29,768	47.8	+21.1

=== General election results ===
South Carolina's 5th congressional district election results, 1974
Party	Candidate	Votes	%	±%
Democratic	Kenneth Lamar Holland	47,617	61.4	+0.5
Republican	B. Len Phillips	29,294	37.8	−1.3
Independent	James B. Sumner	637	0.8	+0.8
Majority		18,323	23.6	+1.8
Turnout		77,548		
Democratic hold				

== 6th congressional district ==
1974 South Carolina's 6th congressional district election
- November 5th, 1974
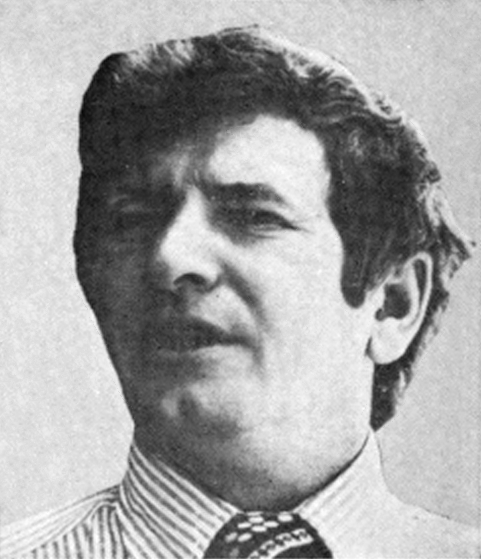

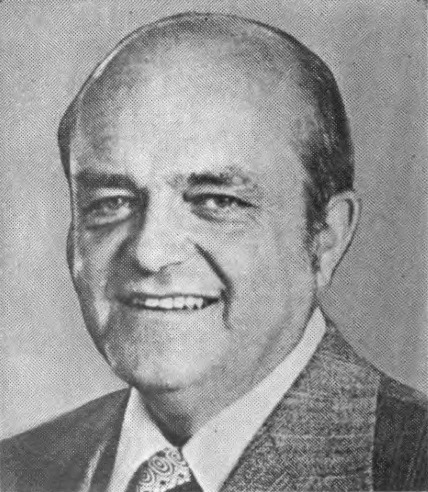
Nominee	John Jenrette	Edward Lunn Young
Party	Democratic	Republican
Popular vote	John Jenrette	41,982
Percentage	52.0%	48.0%
- County results Jenrette: 50–60% 60–70% Young: 50–60%
U.S. Representative before election
Edward Lunn Young
Republican
Elected U.S. Representative
John Jenrette
Democratic

Incumbent Republican Congressman Edward Lunn Young of the 6th congressional district, in office since 1973, was defeated in his bid for re-election by Democrat John Jenrette.

=== General election results ===
South Carolina's 6th congressional district election results, 1974
Party	Candidate	Votes	%	±%
Democratic	John Jenrette	45,396	52.0	+5.4
Republican	Edward Lunn Young (incumbent)	41,982	48.0	−5.4
Majority		3,414	4.0	−2.8
Turnout		87,378		
Democratic gain from Republican				

== See also ==
- United States House elections, 1974
- United States Senate election in South Carolina, 1974
- South Carolina's congressional districts
