= 1976 United States House of Representatives elections in South Carolina =

- November 2, 1976

All 6 South Carolina seats to the United States House of Representatives
	Majority party	Minority party
Party	Democratic	Republican
Last election	5	1
Seats won	5	1
Seat change	Steady	Steady
District results
Democratic
50–60%
60–70%
70–80%
>90%
Republican
50–60%

The 1976 United States House of Representatives elections in South Carolina were held on November 2, 1976, to select six representatives for two-year terms from the state of South Carolina. All six incumbents were re-elected, and the composition of the state delegation remained five Democrats and one Republican.

== 1st congressional district ==
Incumbent Democratic Congressman Mendel Jackson Davis of the 1st congressional district, in office since 1971, defeated Republican challenger Lonnie Rowell.

=== General election results ===
South Carolina's 1st congressional district election results, 1976
Party	Candidate	Votes	%	±%
Democratic	Mendel J. Davis (incumbent)	89,891	68.9	
Republican	Lonnie Rowell	40,598	31.1	
Majority		49,293	37.8	
Turnout		130,489		
Democratic hold				

== 2nd congressional district ==
Incumbent Republican Congressman Floyd Spence of the 2nd congressional district, in office since 1971, defeated Democratic challenger Clyde B. Livingston.

=== General election results ===
South Carolina's 2nd congressional district election results, 1976
Party	Candidate	Votes	%	±%
Republican	Floyd Spence (incumbent)	83,426	57.5	
Democratic	Clyde B. Livingston	60,602	41.8	
Independent	John O'Neal	950	0.7	
Majority		22,824	15.7	
Turnout		144,978		
Republican hold				

== 3rd congressional district ==
Incumbent Democratic Congressman Butler Derrick of the 3rd congressional district, in office since 1975, was unopposed in his bid for re-election.

=== General election results ===
South Carolina's 3rd congressional district election results, 1976
Party	Candidate	Votes	%	±%
Democratic	Butler Derrick (incumbent)	117,740	100.0	
Majority		117,740	100.0	
Turnout		117,740		
Democratic hold				

== 4th congressional district ==
Incumbent Democratic Congressman James R. Mann of the 4th congressional district, in office since 1969, defeated Republican challenger Bob Watkins.

=== General election results ===
South Carolina's 4th congressional district election results, 1976
Party	Candidate	Votes	%	±%
Democratic	James R. Mann (incumbent)	91,711	73.5	
Republican	Bob Watkins	33,149	26.5	
Majority		58,562	47.0	
Turnout		124,860		
Democratic hold				

== 5th congressional district ==
Incumbent Democratic Congressman Kenneth Lamar Holland of the 5th congressional district, in office since 1975, defeated Republican challenger Bobby Richardson.

=== General election results ===
South Carolina's 5th congressional district election results, 1976
Party	Candidate	Votes	%	±%
Democratic	Ken Holland (incumbent)	66,073	51.5	
Republican	Bobby Richardson	62,066	48.3	
Independent	Harold Hough	298	0.2	
Majority		4,007	3.2	
Turnout		128,437		
Democratic hold				

== 6th congressional district ==
Incumbent Democratic Congressman John Jenrette of the 6th congressional district, in office since 1975, defeated Republican challenger Edward Lunn Young.

=== General election results ===
South Carolina's 6th congressional district election results, 1976
Party	Candidate	Votes	%	±%
Democratic	John Jenrette (incumbent)	75,916	55.5	
Republican	Edward Lunn Young	60,288	44.0	
Independent	C.C. Dillingham	688	0.5	
Majority		15,628	11.5	
Turnout		136,892		
Democratic hold				

== See also ==
- United States House elections, 1976
- South Carolina's congressional districts
