= 1971 South Carolina's 1st congressional district special election =

- April 27, 1971

South Carolina's 1st congressional district

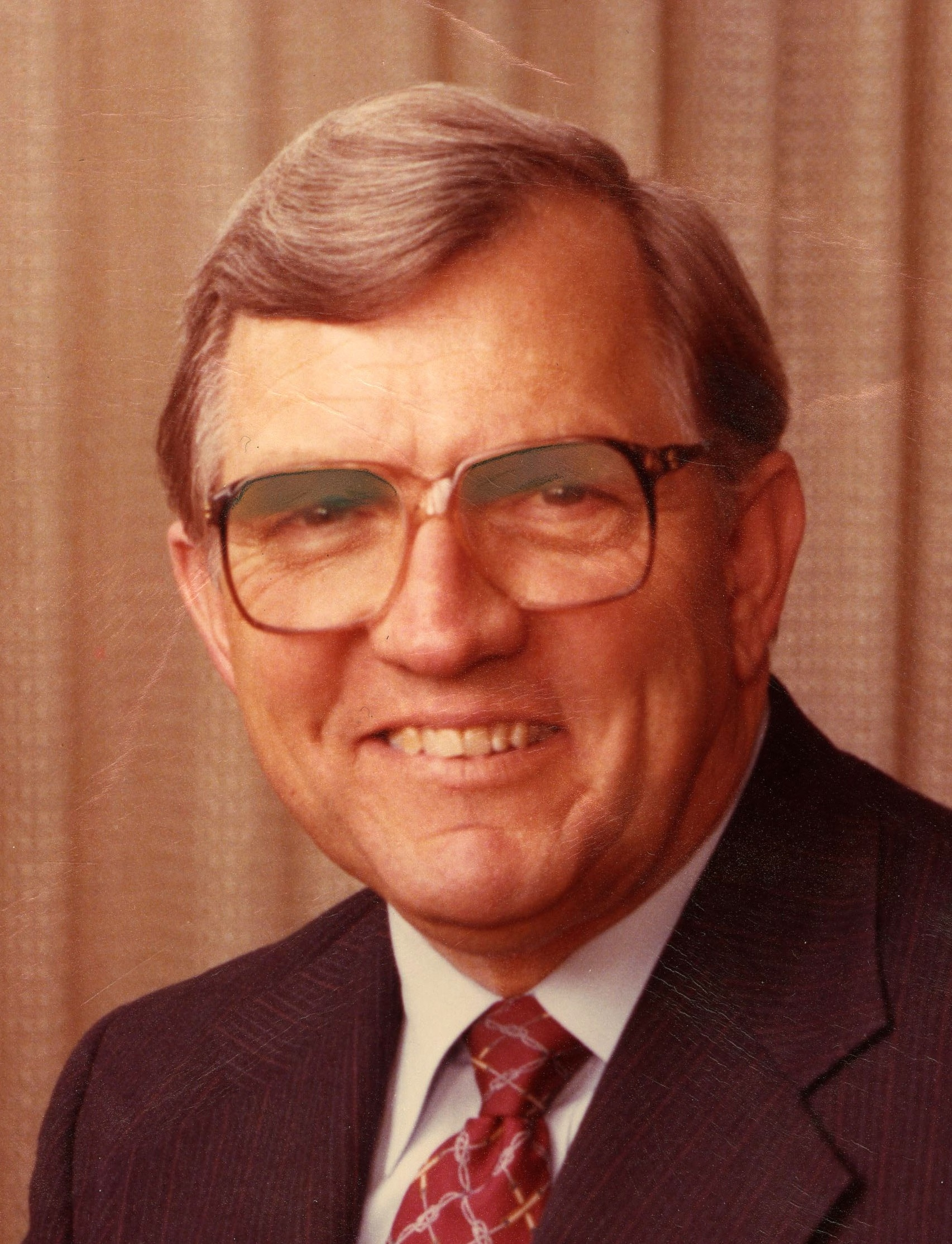

Nominee	Mendel Jackson Davis	James B. Edwards	Victoria DeLee
Party	Democratic	Republican	United Citizens
Popular vote	37,821	32,443	8,029
Percentage	48.3%	41.4%	10.2%
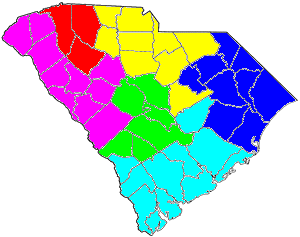
- Map showing South Carolina's congressional districts in 1971 with SC-01 shown in teal
U.S. Representative before election
L. Mendel Rivers
Democratic
Elected U.S. Representative
Mendel Jackson Davis
Democratic

The 1971 South Carolina 1st congressional district special election was held on April 27, 1971, to select a Representative for the 1st congressional district to serve out the remainder of the term for the 92nd Congress. The special election resulted from the death of longtime Representative L. Mendel Rivers on December 28, 1970. Mendel Jackson Davis, a former aide to Rivers and his godson, won a surprising victory in the Democratic primary and went on to win the general election against Republican challenger James B. Edwards.

== Democratic primary ==
Democratic Primary
Candidate	Votes	%
Mendel Jackson Davis	26,709	54.3
J. Palmer Gaillard, Jr.	12,006	24.4
Thomas F. Hartnett	5,252	10.7
J. Mitchell Graham	5,247	10.6

The South Carolina Democratic Party held their primary on February 23, 1971. Charleston mayor J. Palmer Gaillard, Jr. was the frontrunner to win the primary, but he faced stiff competition from state representative Thomas F. Hartnett and from 28-year-old former congressional aide to Rivers, Mendel Jackson Davis. It was widely expected that a runoff would be required two weeks later, but Mendel Jackson Davis garnered over fifty percent and avoided a runoff election. Davis campaigned for the sympathy vote and claimed that he would have more influence in Washington since he had worked with the Democrats for the past ten years.

== Republican primary ==
Republican Primary
Candidate	Votes	%
James B. Edwards	4,690	58.8
Arthur Ravenel, Jr.	2,419	30.3
Harry B. "Buck" Limehouse	871	10.9

The Republicans viewed this open seat as an excellent opportunity to take it from the Democrats because the Lowcountry was a hotbed of conservatism. In fact, Mendel Rivers had stated to Arthur Ravenel, Jr. that the congressman to follow him would be a Republican. The South Carolina Republican Party had never held a primary election for a congressional race, but was compelled by Ravenel to use the primary instead of a nominating convention. The primary date was set for February 20, a Saturday, and Charleston dentist James B. Edwards defeated Ravenel. Edwards was the most conservative of the candidates and he received most of his vote from Charleston County whereas Ravenel dominated the rural counties, but was noted as a liberal who sought support from the black community.

== General election ==
The general election came down to whether Davis could win enough votes from those who still grieved at the loss of his mentor and namesake. While Edwards was a conservative and his positions more closely matched that of the voters than did Davis, he was a Republican in a district that had not had a Republican Representative since 1897. The district electorate was 35% black and Dorchester County black activist Victoria DeLee entered the race as a candidate for the United Citizens Party. Davis tried to solidify his position in the black community by eschewing identity politics and instead proclaiming that he was a Democrat representing both blacks and whites. Although Davis won the election, he did so with less than fifty percent of the vote in large part because DeLee took almost ten percent of the vote.

== Election results ==
South Carolina's 1st Congressional District Special Election Results, 1971
Party	Candidate	Votes	%	±%
Democratic	Mendel Jackson Davis	37,821	48.3	−51.7
Republican	James B. Edwards	32,443	41.4	+41.4
United Citizens Party	Victoria DeLee	8,029	10.2	+10.2
No party	Write-Ins	63	0.1	+0.1
Majority		5,378	6.9	−93.1
Turnout		78,356		
Democratic hold				

== See also ==
- South Carolina's congressional districts
