= 1992 United States Senate election in South Carolina =

- November 3, 1992
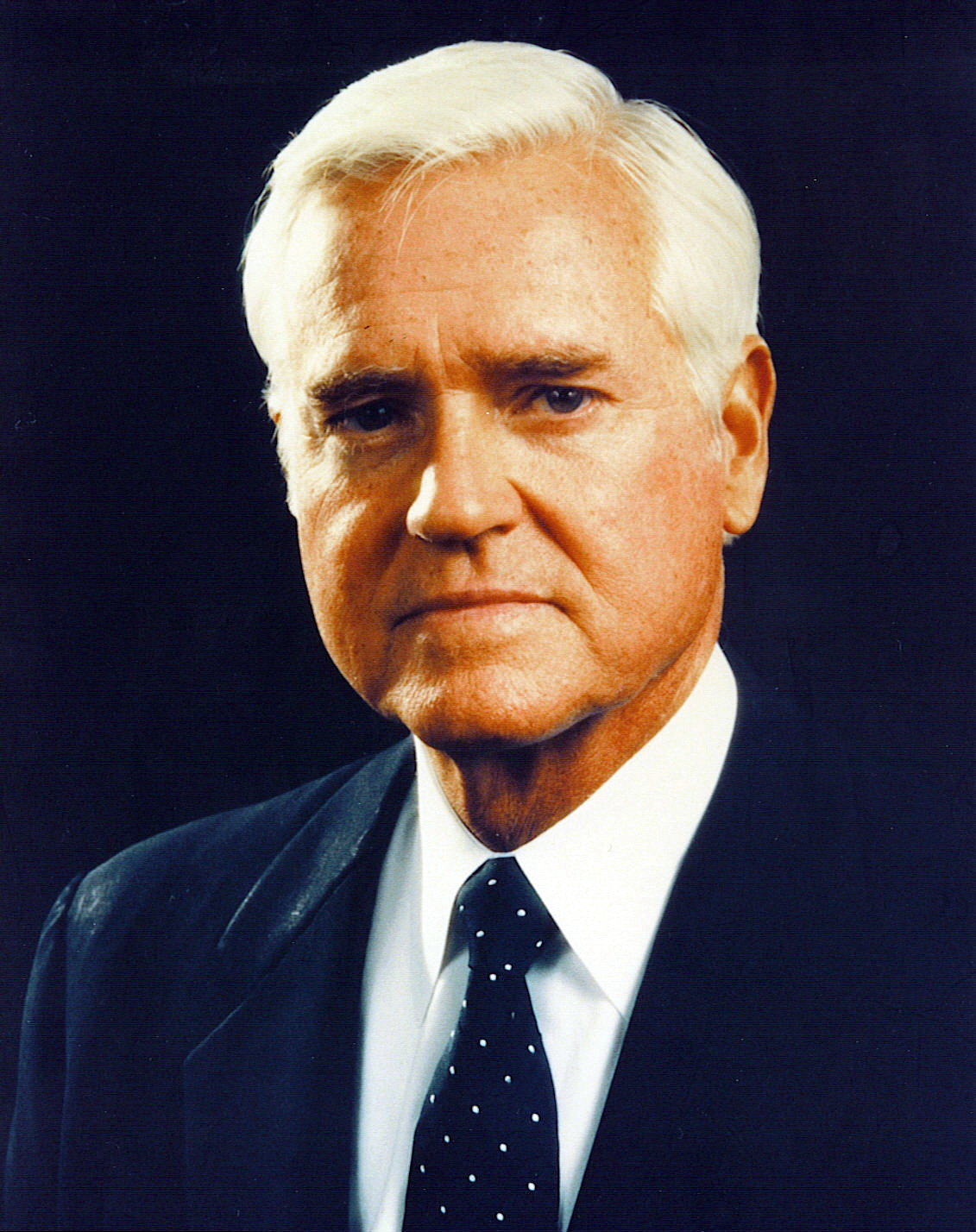

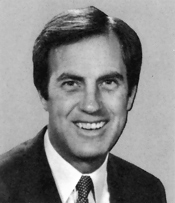
Nominee	Ernest Hollings	Thomas F. Hartnett
Party	Democratic	Republican
Popular vote	591,030	554,175
Percentage	50.07%	46.95%
- County results Hollings: 40–50% 50–60% 60–70% 70–80% Hartnett: 40–50% 50–60%
U.S. senator before election
Ernest Hollings
Democratic
Elected U.S. Senator
Ernest Hollings
Democratic

The 1992 United States Senate election in South Carolina was held on November 3, 1992. Incumbent Democratic U.S. Senator Fritz Hollings won reelection to his sixth (his fifth full) term. Apart from Hollings's first election to the Senate in 1966, this was the closest election of his Senate career. This is the last time that South Carolina simultaneously voted for presidential and U.S. Senate candidates of different political parties.

== Republican primary ==
=== Candidates ===
- Thomas F. Hartnett, former U.S. representative from the 1st congressional district
- Charlie E. Thompson, teacher

Republican primary
Candidate	Votes	%
Thomas F. Hartnett	123,572	76.8%
Charlie E. Thompson	37,352	23.2%

== General election ==
=== Candidates ===
==== Major ====
- Thomas Hartnett (R), former U.S. representative
- Fritz Hollings (D), incumbent U.S. senator

==== Minor ====
- Robert Clarkson (American)
- Mark Johnson (Libertarian)

=== Campaign ===
The race between Hollings and Hartnett was between two politicians from the Lowcountry. Hartnett attacked Hollings for co-sponsoring a bill in 1983 that would have outlawed discrimination against homosexuals and Hollings shot back about questions of Hartnett's integrity for pushing for military contracts with a firm he had ties with in North Charleston. The anti-incumbency mood helped to bring Hartnett close to topping Hollings in the general election, but South Carolina voters traditionally support their incumbent politicians and Hollings was elected for another six-year term, albeit with a much reduced margin.

=== Results ===
South Carolina U.S. Senate election, 1992
Party	Candidate	Votes	%	±%
Democratic	Ernest Hollings (incumbent)	591,030	50.1%	−13.0%
Republican	Thomas F. Hartnett	554,175	46.9%	+11.3%
Libertarian	Mark Johnson	16,987	1.9%	+1.2%
American	Robert Barnwell Clarkson II	11,568	1.0%	+0.4%
No party	Write-Ins	703	0.1%	+0.1%
Majority		36,855	3.2%	−24.3%
Turnout		1,180,438	76.8%	+20.2%
Democratic hold				

== See also ==
- List of United States senators from South Carolina
- 1992 United States Senate elections
