= Bobby Richardson =

American baseball player (born 1935)

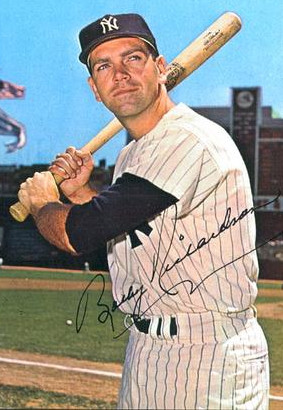
- Richardson, circa 1964–66
- Second baseman
- Born: August 19, 1935 (age 91); Sumter, South Carolina, U.S.
- Batted: Right Threw: Right

MLB debut
- August 5, 1955, for the New York Yankees

Last MLB appearance
- October 2, 1966, for the New York Yankees

MLB statistics
- Batting average: .266
- Home runs: 34
- Runs batted in: 390
- Stats at Baseball Reference

Teams
- New York Yankees (1955–1966)

Career highlights and awards
- 8× All-Star (1957, 1959², 1962–1966); 3× World Series champion (1958, 1961, 1962); World Series MVP (1960); 5× Gold Glove Award (1961–1965)

Robert Clinton Richardson Jr. (born August 19, 1935) is an American former professional baseball second baseman. He played in Major League Baseball (MLB) for the New York Yankees from 1955 through 1966. Batting and throwing right-handed, he formed a top double play combination with fellow Yankee infielders Clete Boyer and Tony Kubek. In the 1960 World Series he became the only World Series Most Valuable Player to be selected from the losing team. In 1962, he led the American League (AL) in hits with 209 and caught a line drive off the bat of Willie McCovey to win the 1962 World Series for the Yankees.

Born in Sumter, South Carolina, Richardson grew up desiring to play for the Yankees after seeing the 1942 film The Pride of the Yankees. Drawing interest from 11 out of 16 MLB teams, he signed with the Yankees and made his debut for them two years later. Earning a regular spot on the roster in 1957, Richardson reached his first All-Star Game that year. He lost starts at second base to Gil McDougald later in the year, though, and was mostly a reserve player in 1958. It was not until 1959 that he would become a regular at second base. In 1960, he was named the World Series MVP; though the Yankees lost the Series in seven games to the Pittsburgh Pirates, Richardson batted .367 with 12 runs batted in (RBI). He won the next two World Series, ending the 1962 series by catching McCovey's line drive in what The Sporting News called baseball's 13th most memorable play in 1999. Richardson led the AL in hits that year, with 209.

From 1961 to 1965, Richardson won five straight Gold Glove Awards at second base. He played in the All-Star Game every year from 1962 through 1966. In 1963, he won the Lou Gehrig Memorial Award, and he played in the World Series in 1963 and 1964. His last two years in the major leagues, he had 164 and 153 hits, respectively. Though only 31 after the 1966 season, Richardson retired to spend more time with his family. The Yankees held a special day for him towards the end of the season, making Richardson the 10th Yankee to be so honored.

After his playing career, Richardson coached college teams for several years. He led the University of South Carolina to its first College World Series in 1975 and laid the groundwork for their later success. In 1986, he led Coastal Carolina University's baseball team to a Big South Conference championship, and he coached at Liberty University from 1987 through 1990. Richardson ran for the United States House of Representatives in South Carolina's 5th congressional district as a Republican in 1976 but lost to incumbent Kenneth Holland. A Christian, Richardson was involved in many Christian organizations during and after his career. He spoke at the White House in 1970 as a representative of the Fellowship of Christian Athletes, appeared in five Billy Graham Crusades, and frequently speaks at churches and other organizations.

== Early life ==
Richardson was the middle child of Robert Sr. and Debbie Richardson of Sumter, South Carolina. He had two sisters, Inez (older) and Willie Ann (younger). Richardson Marble and Granite Works in Sumter was managed by Robert Sr., who also owned some of the interest in the company.

Ever since seeing Pride of the Yankees, released in 1942, Richardson had dreamed of playing for the New York Yankees. Growing up, he practiced his baseball skills with Harry Stokes, a boy in his neighborhood seven years his senior who would play catch with him. Richardson played on a local YMCA/Salvation Army team at the age of ten. Later, he played on ballclubs sponsored by the local Kiwanis Club and American Legion. On the American Legion team, Richardson's coach was Fred Hutchinson, who would later manage the Cincinnati Reds when Richardson faced them in the 1961 World Series. Hutchinson and Richardson became American Legion champions in 1952, Richardson's junior year of high school. Hutchinson also coached Richardson at Edmunds High School.

The University of North Carolina at Chapel Hill and Georgia Tech offered Richardson baseball scholarships, and 11 out of 16 Major League Baseball (MLB) teams showed interest in him as well. Mayo Smith, manager of the Norfolk Tars, a team in the Class B Piedmont League and an affiliate of the New York Yankees, scouted Richardson for New York, as did Bill Harris. Ultimately, Richardson decided to forgo college and sign with the Yankees out of high school (though he later earned a degree in accounting).

== Career ==
=== 1953–56: Playing in the minor leagues, debuting with the Yankees ===
Richardson started his minor league career in 1953 with the Norfolk Tars of the Class B Piedmont League, travelling by bus to Norfolk from Sumter with $85 in coins friends and family had given him. After Richardson batted just .211 in his first 27 games with the Tars, the Yankees assigned him to a Class D team, the Olean Yankees of the PONY League. With Olean, he batted .412 in 32 games and hit his first home run.

In 1954, Richardson was promoted, heading up to the Class A Binghamton Triplets of the Eastern League without having to return to Norfolk. Spending the whole year in Binghamton, he ranked among the Eastern League leaders in games (141, tied for first), runs (81, fifth), hits (171, first), doubles (29, second to Clyde Parris's 40), and batting average (.310, second to Parris's .313). For his contributions, Richardson was named the Eastern League's Most Valuable Player (MVP).

Richardson spent most of spring training with the Yankees in 1955 but was sent to the Class AAA Denver Bears of the American Association to start the year. In 119 games with the Bears, he batted .296 with 146 hits, 99 runs scored, 21 doubles, 12 triples, six home runs, and 59 RBI.

When Gil McDougald found himself on the receiving end of a line drive during batting practice in August 1955, the Yankees called up Richardson. He debuted on August 5, 1955, getting his first hit against Hall of Famer Jim Bunning in a 3–0 victory over the Detroit Tigers. In the field, he was a "nervous wreck" as he later described, but no balls were hit to him. He started four games at second base in three days (including an August 7 doubleheader), then entered three games in the late innings at shortstop before getting sent to the minor leagues on August 15 to make room for a pitcher returning from the disabled list. For some reason, he was sent to the Richmond Virginians of the Class AAA International League this time, with whom he finished the season. Called up again in September, he appeared in four more games for the Yankees before the end of the year.

In 1956, Richardson started the season with the Yankees. However, he only appeared in five games for them, batting .143 before getting sent back to Denver May 13. With the Bears, he ranked among the American Association leaders in batting average (.328, third), runs scored (102, sixth), hits (175, fourth), doubles (30, ninth), and triples (12, tied with Willie Kirkland for second behind Larry Raines's 14).

=== 1957–59: Becoming a full-time player ===
Richardson made the team in 1957 and soon took over the second base job from Billy Martin. The Yankees' volatile infielder had injured himself in a deliberate golf cart collision with Mickey Mantle in spring training, then caused further trouble by getting into a highly publicized brawl at the Copacabana Club in May before getting traded to the Kansas City Athletics in June. Richardson proved a quieter sort of character, if not a great hitter in 1957; manager Casey Stengel said, "Look at him. He doesn't drink, he doesn't smoke, he doesn't chew, he doesn't stay out late, and he still can't hit .250." His fielding was better; Louis Effrat of The New York Times wrote June 25, "He has thrilled the fans with his great stops and catches ... no one gets rid of the ball quicker [on double plays]." Actually, Richardson's .331 average trailed only Mantle among the Yankees on June 25, and he made his first appearance in the All-Star Game that year. However, he batted .188 over the rest of the year, finishing the season with a .256 mark and 78 hits in 305 at bats.

By September, Richardson was losing a lot of starts to Jerry Coleman at second base. Even so, Stengel waited until the last minute to decide whether Coleman or Richardson would start at second base in the 1957 World Series against the Milwaukee Braves. Ultimately, Stengel chose Coleman, who started all seven games for the Yankees as Richardson was limited to two appearances as a pinch-runner and defensive replacement. The Yankees lost the Series in seven games.

Coleman retired following the 1957 season, and Richardson began 1958 as the Yankees' starting second baseman. After batting .203 through the Yankees' first 18 games, he missed 20 in a row as McDougald began getting the starts at second. Richardson started at second from June 5 through June 12 but thereafter spent most of the season on the bench until September, when he again got a few starts at second base. In 73 games (182 at bats), he batted .247 with 18 runs scored and 45 hits. Richardson considered quitting baseball that season because of his struggles, but Ralph Houk, the Yankees' first base coach and Richardson's former manager at Denver, convinced him to keep playing. In the 1958 World Series, again against the Braves, Richardson finished three games for the Yankees at third base and also started Game 4 at third, though he was hitless in two at bats before getting pinch-hit for in the seventh by Elston Howard. However, he became a World Series champion for the first time, as this year the Yankees defeated the Braves in seven games.

Richardson began 1959 as the Yankees' shortstop; Effrat wrote, "[Richardson] is a tremendous fielder no matter where [the Yankees] play him." He moved to second base on April 18 after McDougald suffered cracked knuckles, then returned to shortstop on April 29 when McDougald returned to the lineup. Only batting .232 through the season's first twenty games, he was benched after May 5 in favor of Tony Kubek.

Bill Dickey, the hitting coach for the Yankees, worked with Richardson to improve his hitting. In 1959, Richardson switched to a heavier bat and tried swinging harder at pitches. Given the chance to start at second base again in mid-June, Richardson raised his batting average from .232 to .300 over six games with 11 hits in 18 at bats. He was on the roster for the second All-Star Game of the year and remained the starting second baseman the rest of the season. On July 25, 1959, Richardson and Fritz Brickell both hit their first major league home runs, Richardson's coming against Paul Foytack in a 9–8 victory over the Tigers. Batting .298 coming into the final game of the year, Richardson was the only Yankee with a chance at hitting .300. Stengel promised to remove him from the game if he got a hit in his first at bat (moving his batting average to .300). Richardson flew out to Albie Pearson in his first at bat but got hits in his next two at bats to move his average to .301, then was pinch-hit for in the eighth, preserving the mark. In 134 games (469 at bats), he had 53 runs scored, 141 hits, 18 doubles, six triples, two home runs (both against Foytack), and 33 RBI. His .301 average topped the Yankees and ranked sixth in the American League (AL), and he finished 18th in AL Most Valuable Player (MVP) voting after the season.

=== 1960–62: Starring in the World Series ===
In 1960, Richardson remained the Yankees' starting second baseman all season. On April 30, June 30, and July 18, he had a season-high three hits. One of those hits on April 30 was his only home run of the year, against Arnie Portocarrero, in a 16–0 victory over the Baltimore Orioles. With the Yankees and Athletics tied 7–7 on May 6, Richardson singled against Bob Trowbridge, stole second base, moved to third on a groundout by Ryne Duren, then scored the winning run on a single by McDougald. Batting .208 through June 17, he hit .370 from June 18 through July 23, raising his season average to .273. Thereafter, he batted .215 to finish the year with a .252 mark. In 150 games (460 at bats), he had 45 runs scored, 116 hits, 12 doubles, three triples, and 26 RBI.

The Yankees faced the Pittsburgh Pirates in the 1960 World Series. Richardson went hitless in Game 1 but contributed three in Game 2, scoring three runs as well as the Yankees won 16–3. In Game 3, he came to bat in the first inning with the bases loaded against Clem Labine. Third base coach Frank Crosetti signaled him to bunt, but after running the count to two strikes, Richardson cancelled the plan. (Note: A bunt that goes foul with two strikes is considered the third strike to complete the strikeout.) He remained at the plate long enough to run the at bat to a full count, then hit a grand slam to put the Yankees ahead 6–0. Up to bat with the bases loaded again in the fourth inning, he had a two-RBI single against Red Witt. His six RBI set a new record for most in a single World Series game. In Game 4, he had two hits and drove in another run, but the Yankees lost this one 3–2. After going hitless in Game 5, he hit two triples in Game 6, drove in three runs, and scored one in the Yankees' 12–0 rout of the Pirates to force Game 7. He scored a run in the sixth inning, led off the ninth with a single against Harvey Haddix, and scored another run, but New York lost the game 10–9. Though Pittsburgh second baseman Bill Mazeroski hit a walk-off home run in the bottom of the ninth to win the Series for Pittsburgh, it was Richardson who would be named the World Series MVP after hitting .367 with 12 RBI. He is both the only World Series MVP who played primarily second base and the only MVP who was playing for the losing team when he won the award. Sport Magazine gave him a new Corvette for his efforts. Since he had a growing family, Richardson traded the car for a Chevrolet station wagon.

Houk took over from Stengel as the Yankee manager in 1961; he inserted Richardson either first or second into the batting order each game. On June 15, he had three hits and four RBI, including a three-run home run against Johnny Antonelli as the Yankees beat the Cleveland Indians 11–5. He had four RBI again in the second game of a doubleheader on July 9, including a three-run home run against Don Schwall, but the Yankees lost that game 9–6 to the Boston Red Sox. On August 17, he had three hits and scored three runs in a 5–3 victory over the Chicago White Sox. The Yankees lost 6–4 to the Los Angeles Angels on August 26, but Richardson had five hits in the game. Playing all 162 games for the Yankees, Richardson batted .261 with 80 runs scored, 17 doubles, five triples, three home runs, and 49 RBI. His 662 at bats were third in the AL (behind Brooks Robinson's 668 and Jake Wood's 663), and his 173 hits were fifth in the league. Defensively, he led the AL with 413 putouts and 136 double plays assisted in. Richardson finished 24th in MVP voting and won the Gold Glove at second base, the first of five straight he would win at the position.

Richardson had no RBI in the 1961 World Series against the Cincinnati Reds but did bat .391, with nine hits in 23 at bats. He had three hits apiece in Games 1 and 4. In Game 4, he led off the seventh inning with a single against Jim Brosnan, advanced to second when Vada Pinson misplayed the ball, moved to third base on a wild pitch by Brosnan, and scored on a single by Héctor López as the Yankees won 7–0. The Yankees defeated the Reds in five games, making Richardson a World Series champion for the second time.

On June 9, 1962, against the Orioles, Richardson had four hits, including a two-run home run against Steve Barber that tied the game at two in the seventh; the Yankees went on to win 7–3. He was selected to both of the All-Star Games in 1962. With the Yankees trailing the Minnesota Twins 7–4 in the ninth inning on August 16, 1962, at Metropolitan Stadium, Richardson came up to the plate with the bases loaded. Before the at bat, Mantle told him, "See if you can hit one out. I'm not feeling too good today." Richardson hit a home run to left field against Dick Stigman, the only grand slam of his career besides his one in the 1960 World Series. Though the hit put the Yankees ahead 8–7, they would lose the lead in the bottom of the ninth and lose in extra innings. Two days later, he had three hits and two runs scored, including a three-run home run against Orlando Peña in an 11–7 victory over the Athletics. Against the Washington Senators on September 19, he had four hits, two runs scored, and an RBI in an 8–5 victory. Len Pasculi of the Society for American Baseball Research called 1962 his most productive year, as he batted .302 with eight home runs, 59 RBI, and 11 stolen bases in 161 games. He led the AL in hits (209) and at bats (692). Richardson also ranked among the league leaders in runs scored (99, tied for fourth with Carl Yastrzemski), batting average (.302, seventh), and doubles (38, fourth). He finished second to Mantle in AL MVP voting.

The Yankees faced the San Francisco Giants in the 1962 World Series. Richardson batted a mere .148 in this Series, though he did have two hits and two runs scored in the Yankees' 5–3 triumph of Game 5. However, his glove would provide one of the most famous memories of the series. In Game 7, the Yankees had the only run of the game going into the bottom of the ninth inning, needing three outs to win the series. Matty Alou led off with a single, however, and after two strikeouts, Mays doubled to put the tying run (Alou) at third with future Hall of Famer Willie McCovey coming to bat. If Mays scored, the Giants would win the series. McCovey hit a screaming line drive up the middle which likely would have scored both runs had it made it out of the infield. Hardly moving from his position, Richardson snared the ball for the third out, winning the Series for the Yankees. "People often suggest that I was out of position on that play," Richardson remembered later. "But McCovey hit two hard ground balls to me earlier in the Series, so I played where I thought he would hit the ball." McCovey still had bad memories of it years later. "I broke in with a 4-for-4 my rookie year against a Hall of Fame pitcher, Robin Roberts," he recalled. "I hit more grand slams [18] than anybody in National League history. I hit more home runs [521] than any lefthanded hitter in the National League. But that out is what many people remember about me....I would rather be remembered as the guy who hit the ball six inches over Bobby Richardson's head." Sporting News ranked the catch the 13th most memorable moment in baseball history in 1999, and Charles Schulz famously referenced it in a Peanuts comic strip, where Charlie Brown yells, "Why couldn't McCovey have hit the ball just three feet higher?"

=== 1963–66: Extending his streaks ===
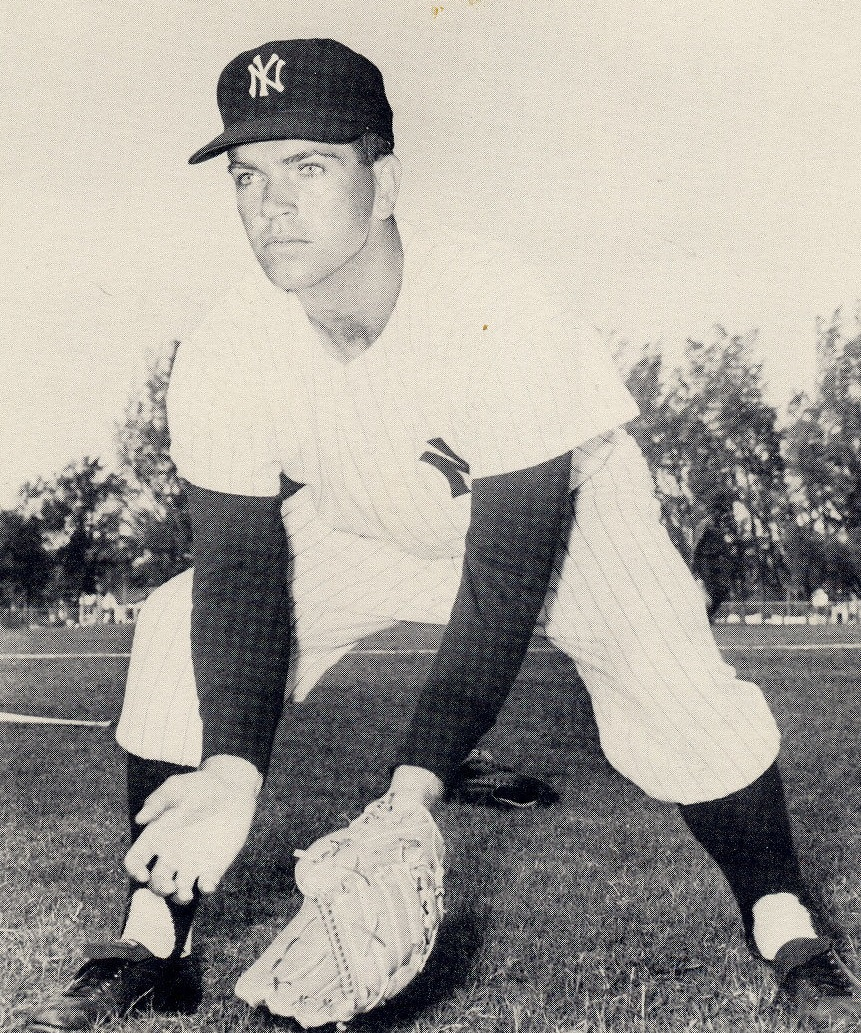
Richardson in 1963

On April 23, 1963, Richardson had three hits, two RBI, and two runs scored in a 7–6 victory over the Senators. His father suffered a stroke in May, then died on July 17. Richardson missed 11 games during the year visiting him and helping get his affairs in order. He had a season high of four hits in a game twice in quick succession, on July 4 in the first game of a doubleheader and on July 6. He again represented the Yankees in the All-Star Game. On September 5, he singled against Steve Ridzik, stole second base, and scored on a Roger Maris hit due to an error by shortstop Ed Brinkman to tie a game with the Senators at 2 in the sixth inning. The Yankees went on to win 3–2 in 12 innings. After setting a career high with eight home runs the year before, Richardson hit three in 1963, all in Yankee losses. In 151 games, Richardson batted .265 with 72 runs scored and 48 RBI. He led the league in at bats (630) for the second year in a row, finished seventh with 167 hits and tied three other players for seventh with 15 stolen bases. Richardson again garnered AL MVP votes, finishing tenth this time. He won the Lou Gehrig Memorial Award, given by Gehrig's Columbia University fraternity to the major leaguer who best demonstrates Gehrig's character.

In Game 1 of the 1963 World Series, which the Los Angeles Dodgers swept in four games, Richardson struck out three times against Sandy Koufax—his only three-strikeout game in 1,448 regular-season/World Series games. (Koufax would finish with 15 strikeouts, then a World Series single-game record.) Just that regular season, Richardson had struck out only 22 times in 630 at-bats. He had a mere three hits in the World Series but played each game; Richardson had now played in 23 straight World Series games dating back to 1960.

On May 10, 1964, Richardson had five hits and scored three runs in a 12–2 victory over the Indians. Less than a month later, he had five hits on June 4 in a 9–7 victory over the Twins. He picked up his 1,000th hit on June 12 with a line drive to left field against Frank Baumann in a 6–1 victory over the White Sox in the first game of a doubleheader. The hit had proved difficult to come by for Richardson, who had put the ball in play seven times in his last two games without reaching base safely. Once again, he was selected to the All-Star Game. In the first game of a doubleheader on July 26, he had three hits, including a two-RBI single against Mickey Lolich and a solo home run against Terry Fox in an 11–6 victory over the Tigers. In 159 games, he batted .267 with four home runs, 50 RBI, and 11 stolen bases. For the third year in the row, he led the AL in at bats with 679. He also led the league with 148 singles, ranked third in the league with 181 hits (behind Tony Oliva's 217 and B. Robinson's 294), and tied Bob Allison for ninth in the AL with 90 runs scored. He finished 17th in AL MVP voting after the season.

In the World Series against the St. Louis Cardinals, Richardson set a World Series record with 13 hits; this record has since been tied by Lou Brock and Marty Barrett in the 1968 and 1986 World Series, respectively. However, batting against Cardinal ace Bob Gibson with the Yankees trailing 7–5 in the ninth inning of Game 7, he popped out to Dal Maxvill for the final out of the Series. Richardson also had the dubious distinction of committing errors that affected the outcome of two games in the Series. In the sixth inning of Game 4, he mishandled Dick Groat's ground ball for a double play that would have ended the inning with no runs scoring; the error was followed one batter later by Ken Boyer's grand slam—the four runs the Cardinals needed in defeating the Yankees 4–3. In the fifth inning of Game 5, he bobbled Curt Flood's double play ground ball, which also would have ended that inning without any damage. The Cardinals eventually scored twice in the inning, then won the game 5–2 on Tim McCarver's 10th inning, three-run home run. This was Richardson's final (of seven) World Series; he played all 30 World Series games from 1960 through 1964.

On May 24, 1965, he had three hits, drove in two runs, and scored two more times in a 15–5 victory over Cleveland. After hitting into a fielder's choice on June 15, Richardson stole second base, then scored on a Maris single to put the Yankees up 1–0; however, the Yankees would lose the game 2–1 in the 10th inning. He was selected to the All-Star Game once again. On July 17, he had four hits and scored twice in a 5–4 victory over Washington. Five days later, his home run against Gary Peters put the Yankees ahead to stay in a 2–1 victory over the White Sox. On August 8, Ray Barker and Richardson hit back-to-back home runs against Denny McLain in a 6–5 victory over the Tigers. In 160 games, Richardson batted .247 with 76 runs scored, 164 hits, 28 doubles, six home runs, and 47 RBI. He finished 20th in AL MVP voting.

Richardson had three hits and scored three times on May 25 in an 11–6 victory over the Angels. He hit a three-run double against Tommy John on June 2 to turn a 3–2 deficit into a 5–3 lead for the Yankees, who defeated the White Sox. Five days later, he had three hits, three runs scored, and three RBI, including a home run against John O'Donoghue in a 7–2 victory over the Indians. On June 29, he had five hits, one of which was a home run against Rollie Sheldon and was followed by two more by Mantle and Joe Pepitone in a 6–5 victory over the Red Sox. Richardson made the All-Star Game for the fifth year in a row, his seventh and final selection. He had four hits on August 15, including a home run against Lolich, as the Yankees defeated the Tigers 6–5. On September 11, he hit his last major league home run against John Wyatt in the 10th inning of a 4–2 victory over the Red Sox. He played in his final game on October 2, recording a hit and an RBI in a 2–0 victory over the White Sox. In 149 games, he batted .251 with 71 runs scored, 153 hits, 21 doubles, seven home runs, and 42 RBI.

Though he was just 31 following the 1966 season, Richardson retired following the year. He had decided to retire after the 1965 season, but the Yankees convinced him to play one more season since Kubek had to retire due to injuries after the 1965 season. "I wanted to take the kids to school, help them with homework and watch or help coach their teams," he explained. The Yankees honored him by declaring September 17 "Bobby Richardson Day," making Richardson the tenth Yankee to be honored at the stadium with a special day. "How lucky it has been for me to have been a Yankee. To God be the glory," he said to the fans.

=== Legacy ===
Richardson racked up 1,432 hits in his career, with a lifetime batting average of .266, 34 home runs and 390 RBIs. Over his 12-year major league career, he scored 643 runs and stole 73 stolen bases. He also had 196 doubles and 37 triples. Defensively, he had an all-time fielding percentage of .979 at second base, and six seasons with 100 or more double plays turned.

From 1961 to 1965, Richardson won five consecutive Gold Gloves at second base; no other Yankees second baseman won the award until Robinson Canó in 2010. He formed a double-play combination with shortstop Tony Kubek. Alongside third baseman Clete Boyer, Richardson and Kubek anchored an infield that was regarded as one of the premier defensive units in Major League Baseball during the early 1960s.

Richardson was also known for his ability to make contact. He struck out just 243 times, less than 5% of his plate appearances. A leadoff hitter who rarely missed a game, Richardson led the league in at bats three times. Following Martin's trade, he wore the uniform number 1 for the majority of his career (1958–1966). He led the league in at bats per strikeout three times during his career, 1964–1966. A skilled bunter, he led the league in sacrifice hits in 1962 and 1964.

Despite the raw totals, Richardson was a poor offensive player when measured by sabermetrics. Since he rarely walked, his career OBP was .299, and since he had little power, his career slugging percentage was only .335. Every year from 1961 to 1966 he finished in the top five in the American League in outs made, leading the league four of those six years. As Bill James remarked, "Richardson, frankly, was a horrible leadoff man. He rarely got on base and almost never got into scoring position. Leading off for the 1961 Yankees, playing 162 games and batting 662 times, with 237 home runs coming up behind him, Richardson scored only 80 runs. 80. Eight-zero...Plus Richardson used up a zillion outs while he was not scoring runs." Only once, in 1962, which was Richardson's best year, was his OPS+ over 100, and his career OPS+ was only 77.

=== Coaching ===
In the late 1960s, Paul Dietzel asked Richardson if he would become the head baseball coach for the University of South Carolina Gamecocks. Richardson told him no twice, as he was under a personal services contract with the Yankees. However, after Dietzel asked him a third time, Richardson secured permission from the Yankees to take the job, assuming the role in 1970. He would often pitch batting practice and drive the team bus for events. Richardson also tried to perform recruiting for the school but delegated the responsibility to others after he figured out "I wasn't going after the good players." Under Richardson, Larry Keith of Sports Illustrated wrote, "South Carolina rarely bunts, often hits-and-runs and is always looking for the big inning." Richardson led the Gamecocks to their first National Collegiate Athletic Association (NCAA) Tournament appearance in 1974, which set the stage for what would happen a year later in 1975 when South Carolina posted a 51–6–1 record and made the College World Series for the first time ever. They advanced all the way to the national championship game against Texas before losing 5–1 to the Longhorns. Richardson left South Carolina after the 1976 season, finishing his tenure with a 221–92–1 record and three NCAA tournament appearances. Dennis Brunson of The Item said of Richardson's contributions, "Richardson had laid the groundwork for a program that would participate in the regionals in nine of the first 13 years under [new head coach June] Raines and would play in the CWS four times." In the 1980s, Richardson served as the baseball coach for two seasons (1985–86) at Coastal Carolina University in Conway, South Carolina, where he compiled a record of (61–38) and led the team to the Big South Conference championship in 1986. After the 1986 season, he resigned as head coach at Coastal Carolina to replace Al Worthington as the baseball coach at Liberty University. "I came here as athletic director under a different administration and [Chancellor] Ron [Eaglin] felt I should resign as athletic director and focus on baseball," Richardson explained the decision to resign, with Eaglin saying the two had disagreed on a budget for the next season. Worthington, who had become Liberty's athletic director, served as pitching coach under Richardson, who coached the Flames for the next four seasons before retiring in 1990. Richardson succeeded Worthington as Liberty's athletic director in December 1989, but resigned six months later.

== Head coaching record ==
Record table
Season	Team	Overall	Conference	Standing	Postseason
South Carolina (Atlantic Coast Conference) (1970–1971)
1970	South Carolina	14–20	9–12	6th	
1971	South Carolina	19–13	7–7	T–4th	
South Carolina (NCAA Division I District 3 baseball independents) (1972–1976)
1972	South Carolina	25–16			
1973	South Carolina	26–15–1			
1974	South Carolina	48–8			NCAA Regional
1975	South Carolina	51–6–1			College World Series Runner-Up
1976	South Carolina	38–14			NCAA Regional
South Carolina:		220–92–2 (.705)	–		
Coastal Carolina (NAIA Big South Conference) (1985–1985)
1985	Coastal Carolina	30–19	13–5		NAIA District
Coastal Carolina (Big South Conference) (1986–1986)
1986	Coastal Carolina	31–19	9–9	2nd	
Coastal Carolina:		61–38 (.616)	–		
Liberty (NCAA Division I Independents) (1987–1990)
1987	Liberty	12–26			
1988	Liberty	18–32			
1989	Liberty	25–24			
1990	Liberty	23–24–1			
Liberty:		78–106–1 (.424)	–		
Total:		359–236–4 (.593)			
National champion Postseason invitational champion Conference regular season champion Conference regular season and conference tournament champion Division regular season champion Division regular season and conference tournament champion Conference tournament champion

== 1976 political campaign ==
In 1974, Nixon tried to convince Richardson to run as a Republican for the United States House of Representatives in South Carolina's 5th congressional district. Later, a private poll indicated he would have been the favorite had he run. Two years later, President Gerald Ford convinced Richardson to resign from his coaching position at the University of South Carolina to run for the seat. Richardson lost to incumbent Democrat Kenneth Holland by a narrow margin. Holland was aided by the strength of Jimmy Carter's winning campaign in South Carolina to hold off Richardson by a tally of 66,073 (51.4%) to 62,095 (48.3%). Richardson's campaign was supported by former baseball players Joe DiMaggio, Ted Williams, Bob Feller, and Wilmer "Vinegar Bend" Mizell among others, though former roommate Tony Kubek declined to campaign for him because Kubek was a Democrat.

=== Election results ===
South Carolina's 5th congressional district election, 1976
Party	Candidate	Votes	%
Democratic	Ken Holland (incumbent)	66,073	51.44
Republican	Bobby Richardson	62,066	48.32
Independent	Harold Hough	298	0.23
Total votes		128,437	100.00
Democratic hold			

== Personal life ==
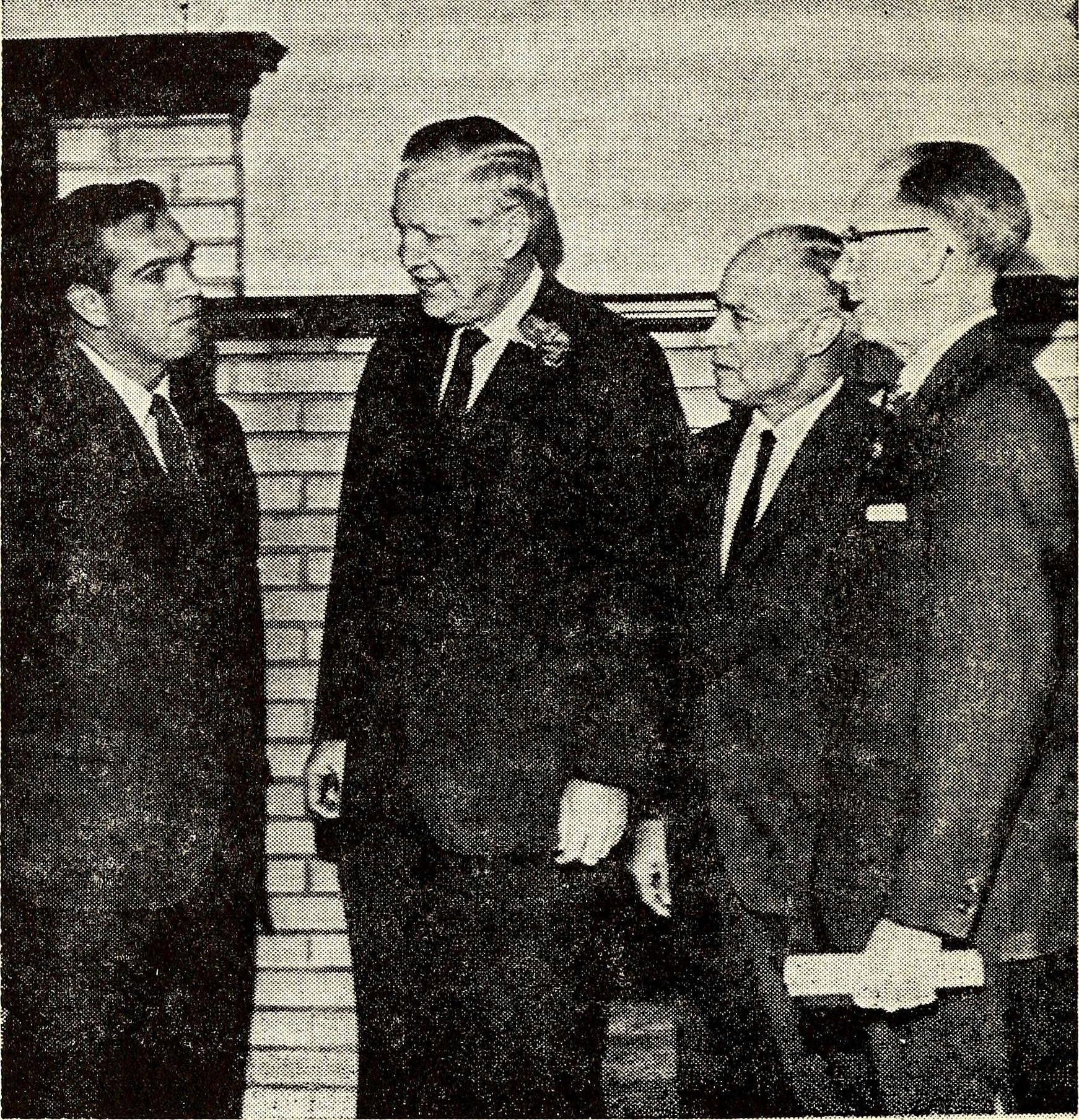
Richardson (left) with North Carolina Governor Moore in 1968

Betsy Dobson, Richardson's future spouse, met him at Grace Baptist Church of Sumter. In 1954, they went to a miniature golf course on their first date. Two years later, they were married. In an unusual move, Houk granted Richardson permission to leave the Denver Bears midseason to get married. The couple had three sons–Robbie (born 7/2/57), Ron (7/13/58), and Rich (8/27/68)–and two daughters–Christie (12/30/60) and Jeannie (1/21/64). In 1960, the Richardsons were renting a house in Ridgewood, New Jersey. They lived in Sumter during the offseason, where Richardson was a general secretary for the local Young Men's Christian Association and host for a radio sports show. Hunting is one of his favorite hobbies. He and teammate Bobby Shantz went gun shopping together in Kansas City in 1959, and fellow major-leaguer Billy O'Dell used to hunt with him in the offseason. His roommates when travelling with the Yankees at various times included Kubek and Shantz.

Richardson is a Christian. During his time with the Yankees, he would organize church services for the team when they were travelling. Friend and teammate Mickey Mantle described him as a "clean-living, practicing Christian." He was involved with the Fellowship of Christian Athletes (FCA) and the American Tract Society (ATS) during his career, as well as many charities. After his career, he continued to be involved with those organizations. He served as the president of the Baseball Chapel for 10 years, served on the President's Council for Physical Fitness, and earned the Golden Gavel Award from Toastmasters International. President Richard Nixon, who hosted church services at the White House each week of his presidency, invited the FCA to speak on October 18, 1970. One of four representatives, Richardson spoke on Jesus and the rich young man from Mark, Chapter 10. Concerning the young man's search for guidance, Richardson said, "He didn't go to India and ask a guru; he didn't get caught up in the younger generation, but he went to God's son, Jesus Christ, the Messiah, with his question." He has spoken at five Billy Graham Crusades, as well as at various churches. Richardson is a speaker with Christian Speakers 360, available to appear at events. Several of his Yankee teammates requested that he preside at their funerals, most notably Mickey Mantle. Speaking to an audience of 2,000 (plus television viewers) at Mantle's interment, Richardson said there were two types of people in this world, those who said yes to Christ and those who said no. Shortly before Mantle's death, as Richardson had visited Mantle in a Dallas hospital, Mantle had told Richardson that he had become a Christian.

In 1965, Richardson released his autobiography, The Bobby Richardson Story. The story became a movie in 1968. Excerpts from the film's audio track were available on an LP record titled: The Bobby Richardson Story: The Exciting First-Person Account of His Own Life, By the Yankees' Famous Second Baseman. He released a new autobiography in 2012 called Impact Player.

== See also ==
- List of Major League Baseball players who spent their entire career with one franchise
