= John Carter (film editor) =

American film editor (1922–2018)

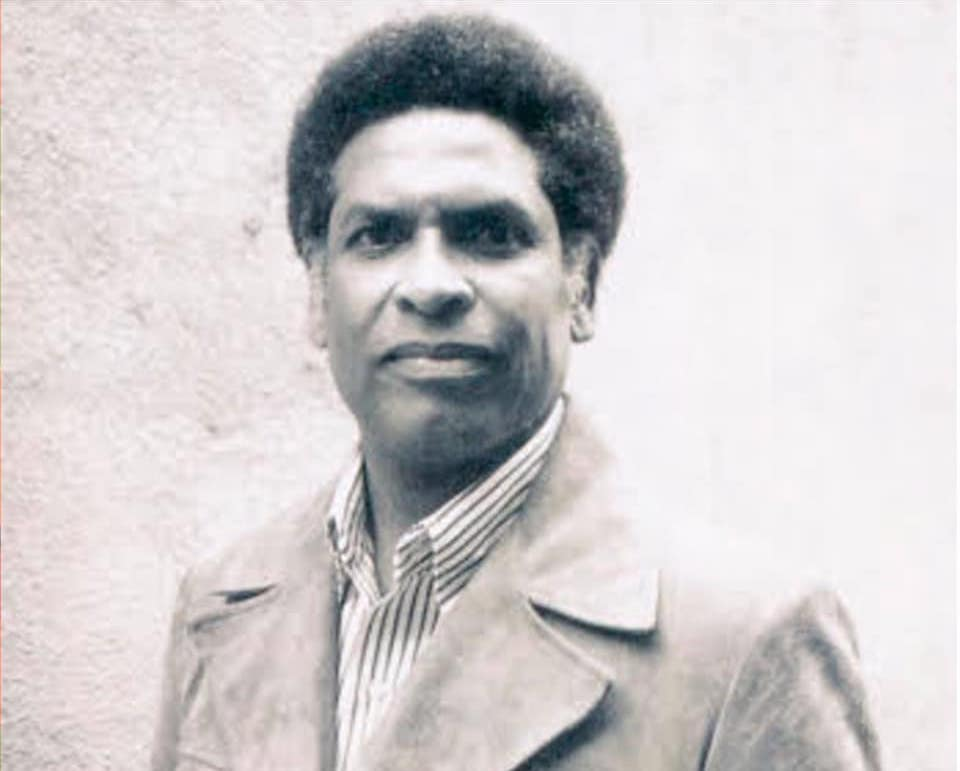
- Portrait of John Carter
- Born: September 22, 1922; Newark, New Jersey, U.S.
- Died: August 13, 2018 (aged 95); White Plains, New York, U.S.
- Occupation: Film editor
- Years active: 1956–2018

John Neares Carter (September 22, 1922 – August 13, 2018) was an American film editor. He rose to the ranks at CBS on the Ed Sullivan Show, becoming the first African-American film editor to be employed by network television in New York. For the last four of his twelve years with CBS, he was the supervising film editor for the award-winning documentary unit, Eye On New York. John left CBS to form his own company John Carter Associates, Inc.

== Personal life ==
John was born in Newark, New Jersey to William and Marie Carter on September 22, 1922. He was the third of four children. His family moved to Asbury Park, New Jersey in 1927. He was an athlete on the basketball, football and track teams at Asbury Park High School, and an avid swimmer during the summer months along the Jersey shore. He was a member of Mt. Pisgah Baptist Temple, where he acted in religious plays directed by his father. In 1943 he was drafted into the U.S. Army. He served in Europe during WWII as a staff sergeant earning the Soldier's Medal of Valor, American Service Medal, World War II Victory Medal, European African Middle Eastern Service Medal and Good Conduct Medal.

After his honorable discharge in 1946 John trained at the New York Institute of Photography and the Brooklyn Institute of Motion Picture Production. Upon graduating, he went into an apprenticeship program at the Signal Corps Pictorial Center for film editing. During this time, he met the love of his life Carole at a dance in Harlem at the Hotel Theresa on the top floor in the Skyline Ballroom. They were married on August 22, 1954, in Idlewild, Michigan. They had 3 children, and 6 grandsons.

He died at his White Plains, New York home on August 13, 2018, aged 95.

== Career ==
In 1956 John left the Signal Corps and was hired by CBS-TV, becoming the first African-American film editor to be employed by network television in New York. For the last four of his twelve years with CBS, he was the supervising film editor for the award-winning documentary unit, Eye On New York. In 1968, John left CBS to form his own company John Carter Associates, Inc. His first film was “Paper Lion,” about George Plimpton and starring Alan Alda. He then went on to work on many other films including the documentary “King: A Filmed Record…Montgomery to Memphis," in 1970 that was nominated for the Academy Award for Best Documentary Feature. He was also the editor for the original film “Solomon Northup’s Odyssey”, directed by Gordon Parks which was later made into a film called “12 Years a Slave”. John has mentored many young film makers and has worked with many prominent directors including Tyler Perry, Tim Story, Bill Duke, John G. Avildsen, Elaine May and George Tillman Jr. to name just a few. In 1984, he made his sole directorial effort, Zombie Island Massacre, a slasher film set on a Caribbean island.

Carter was the first African-American to join the American Cinema Editors society.

In 1972, he received a BAFTA Award nomination for best editing for Miloš Forman's Taking Off.

He was a member of: American Cinema Editors (the first Black ACE member), Academy of Motion Pictures Arts and Sciences and Motion Picture Editors Guild and the Westchester Clubmen. At the age of 85, John retired after editing more than 50 feature films.

== Filmography ==
- Paper Lion (1968)
- Cotton Comes to Harlem (1970)
- King: A Filmed Record... Montgomery to Memphis (1970)
- Taking Off (1971)
- The Heartbreak Kid (1972 film) (1972)
- I Could Never Have Sex with Any Man Who Has So Little Regard for My Husband (1973)
- Mikey and Nicky (1976)
- Between the Lines (1977)
- The Formula (1980)
- Cold River (1982)
- Zombie Island Massacre (1984)
- Solomon Northup's Odyssey (1984)
- The Killing Floor (1985)
- Moments Without Proper Names (1987)
- Lean on Me (1989)
- The Karate Kid Part III (1989)
- The Five Heartbeats (1991)
- Boomerang (1992)
- Deep Cover (1992)
- The Cemetery Club (1993)
- Sister Act 2: Back in the Habit (1993)
- Friday (1995)
- A Thin Line Between Love and Hate (1996)
- Set It Off (1996)
- Soul Food (1997)
- The Wood (1999)
- 3 Strikes (2000)
- Men of Honor (2000)
- Barbershop (2002)
- Johnson Family Vacation (2004)
- Madea's Family Reunion (2006)
- Shortcut to Happiness (2007)
