= J. Sidi Limehouse III =

American politician

Sidi Limehouse

Member of the South Carolina House of Representatives from Charleston County
- In office 1971–1972
- In office January 9, 1968 – 1968
- Preceded by: George Grice
- Succeeded by: James C. Joseph

Personal details
- Born: Julian Sidi Limehouse III; December 17, 1938 (age 87) Charleston, South Carolina
- Party: Republican
- Education: Clemson University (BS)
- Occupation: produce broker, farmer

Military service
- Allegiance: United States
- Branch/service: United States Air Force

Julian Sidi Limehouse III (born December 17, 1938) is an American politician in the state of South Carolina. He served in the South Carolina House of Representatives from 1967 to 1968 and 1971 to 1972, representing Charleston County, South Carolina. He was arrested for trafficking marijuana from South America. He now works as a produce broker at a wholesale vegetable market, and as a farmer at Rosebank Farms Johns Island, South Carolina. In 1972, he ran for Congress against Mendel Davis in South Carolina's 1st congressional district.
