= Zombie Island Massacre =

1984 film by John N. Carter

- Theatrical release poster
- Directed by: John N. Carter
- Screenplay by: Logan O'Neil; William Stoddard
- Story by: David Broadnax; Logan O'Neil
- Produced by: David Broadnax
- Starring: David Broadnax; Rita Jenrette
- Cinematography: Robert M. Baldwin
- Edited by: John N. Carter
- Music by: Harry Manfredini
- Distributed by: Troma Entertainment
- Release date: November 1984
- Running time: 88 minutes
- Country: United States
- Language: English

Zombie Island Massacre is a 1984 horror film directed by film editor John N. Carter (in his sole directing effort) and starred David Broadnax and Rita Jenrette. The film is currently distributed by Troma Entertainment.

== Plot ==
A group of American tourists on vacation in the Caribbean watch a voodoo ceremony. As they take a tour of a local island at night, they become stranded when their bus driver disappears. The group of tourists take refuge in an old mansion, one by one falling victim to an unknown menace.

== Cast ==
- David Broadnax as Paul
- Rita Jenrette as Sandy
- Tom Cantrell as Steve
- Diane Clayre Holub as Connie
- Ian McMillian as Joe
- George Peters as Whitney
- Dennis Stephenson as Tour Guide
- Trevor Reid as Voodoo Priest
- Christopher Ferris as Matt

== Release ==
Troma released Zombie Island Massacre on a triple pack in January 2004 and a 15 pack in October 2006. In August 2014, it played at the eighth B Movie Celebration, hosted by Joe Bob Briggs.

== Reception ==
Ian Jane of DVD Talk said that the film has "a sense of ridiculous charm to it" and is enjoyable despite its flaws. Writing in the Zombie Movie Encyclopedia, academic Peter Dendle said, "Though up-scale for a Troma release, this is still unbearably tedious and awful, to be avoided by any expedient." Dendle writes that although the film does not have traditional Romero-style zombies, the voodoo ceremony raises what seems to be Haitian zombie.
