= Rita Jenrette =

American actress, journalist and executive (born 1949)

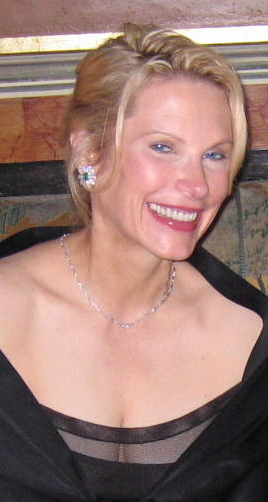
- Rita Jenrette in 2007
- Born: Rita Sue Carpenter; November 25, 1949 (age 76); San Antonio, Texas, U.S.
- Occupations: Actress, model, television reporter, real estate broker
- Known for: Activism on behalf of architectural preservation.
- Spouses: John Jenrette (m. 1976; div. 1981) Nicolò Boncompagni Ludovisi (m. 2009; died 2018)

Rita Jenrette (née Carpenter) is an American actress, television journalist, and real-estate executive.

== Education ==
Jenrette earned her bachelor's degree in history, cum laude, from the University of Texas in 1971.

== Career ==
=== Politics ===
In 1973, she became the director of research for the Republican Party of Texas. In 1974, Jenrette was a visiting lecturer at the Taft Political Institute at Trinity University. In 1975, she was opposition research director of the Republican National Committee, under the chairmanship of Mary Louise Smith. On September 10, 1976, she married freshman Democratic whip John Jenrette (of ABSCAM notoriety) of South Carolina, 18 months after meeting him on Capitol Hill.

In 1977, Jenrette worked as a research associate at the Office of Technology Assessment then under the co-chairmanship of Senators Hubert H. Humphrey and Edward M. Kennedy. She co-authored a report with Ray Hoehle on the Food for Peace program, which was presented to the Presidential Commission on World Food Hunger.

In 1978, Jenrette was picked by the Washington Post Sunday magazine as one of four dynamic young women of Washington, DC.

=== Entertainment ===
She was a Clairol model.

She has written two published books. My Capitol Secrets appeared in 1981 and detailed her experiences as a Congressional spouse. Conglomerate, an online romance novel, was published in 1985. She reports that Roger Ailes offered her a position as a Washington television correspondent, but she declined.

In the 1980s, Jenrette appeared in several plays, movies, and television series. In 1982, Jenrette received the Drama-Logue Critics Award for her performance in The Philadelphia Story. On-screen, she appeared in Fantasy Island (1982), Zombie Island Massacre (1984), and The Equalizer (1988). Her last television series role was in Dream On (1992), as Reporter Jennifer Klarik.

In 1986, she appeared in an episode of Lifestyles of the Rich and Famous. This led in 1989 to Jenrette's becoming an on-air journalist on Fox television’s A Current Affair, where she interviewed celebrities.

=== Real estate ===
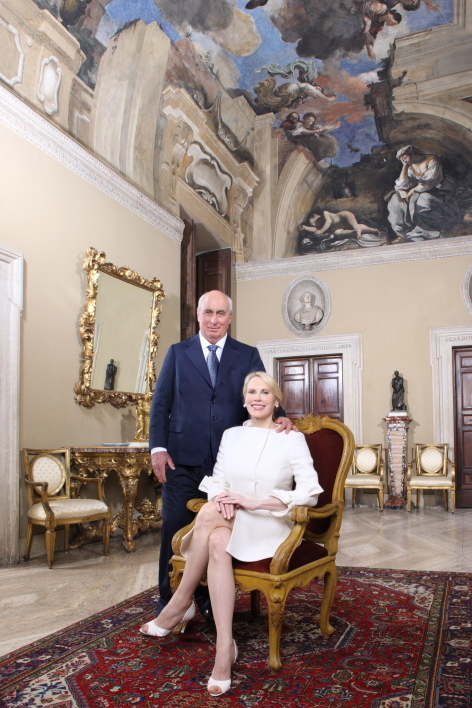
Photo from 2009 wedding to Prince Nicolò Boncompagni Ludovisi of Piombino

In 1994, she began a career in real estate. In 1996, Crain's New York Business described Jenrette as a "Power Broker New York Style." In 1999, she sued Simon Properties for $6 million for failing to pay her a commission on the $800 million sale of the General Motors Building to Donald Trump; the parties agreed to a settlement before the case went to trial. In 2003, she completed an Executive Management Program at Harvard Business School.

== Personal life ==
Born Rita Carpenter, her father, C. Hunt Carpenter, was a millionaire from an insurance business and natural-gas investments. She worked for the Republican party, but in 1976 married Democratic South Carolina Congressman John Jenrette.

John Jenrette was convicted of taking a bribe during the Abscam investigation in October 1980. Rita Jenrette appeared on the Phil Donahue Show, and her husband called in live to join the conversation. At his trial, she testified in her husband's defense.

Subsequently, she alerted authorities to $25,000 she found in her husband's closet, saying it was part of the Abscam money.

She gave an interview to Playboy that appeared in the April 1981 issue, accompanied by a nude pictorial. The article's revelation that her husband and she had sex on the steps of the U.S. Capitol during a break in an all-night House session caused a hoopla. (The comedy group Capitol Steps takes its name from this escapade.) She claimed that the couple was still "happily married" at the time the Playboy pictorial was photographed, although they had separated in January 1981, before it was published (they were divorced shortly thereafter).

Jenrette again appeared in Playboy in the May 1984 issue on the cover and in a pictorial.

She met Prince Nicolò Boncompagni Ludovisi of Piombino (1941–2018) in 2003 while working as a broker to develop a project on land he owned. He was at the time married to his second wife, Ludmilla Boncompagni Ludovisi. Boncompagni Ludovisi and Jenrette married on May 27, 2009. To commemorate the marriage with Jenrette, the prince commissioned the re-creation of a fragrance originally devised for one of his ancestors. The couple lived in his 16th-century family home in Rome, called the Casino dell'Aurora, or sometimes Casino Ludovisi, which they renovated. She resided for years on the premises and opened it to the public, giving tours and hosting charitable events there. She has promoted new research on the history of the property, as well as the creation of a related scholarly resource, the Archivio Digitale Boncompagni Ludovisi.

To settle an inheritance dispute, an Italian judge ordered Villa Aurora to be offered at auction in January 2022 for $531 million, but it attracted no bidders. It was to be put up for auction again at a slightly lower price. It contains the world's only ceiling mural by Caravaggio.

On 20 April 2023, Jenrette was ordered to vacate the Casino Ludovisi by order of a court of law as part of a ruling that she failed to maintain the historic property after a wall collapsed and blocked a nearby street. She declined to leave, forcing the Carabinieri to evict her. As she fled through the back door of the villa, she tripped and broke two ribs and her clavicle. As of May 13, 2023, she was staying in a villa outside Rome owned by a friend.

== Filmography ==
Rita Jenrette film and television credits
Year	Title	Role	Notes
1982	Fantasy Island	Nurse Heavenly	Episode: "Save Sherlock Holmes"
1982	The Edge of Night	Sharon	2 episodes
1984	Zombie Island Massacre	Sandy	Film
1986	The Malibu Bikini Shop	Aunt Ida	Film
1987	End of the Line	Sharon	Film
1988	The Equalizer	Hooker	Episode: "Always a Lady"
1992	Dream On	Reporter Jennifer Klarik	2 episodes
