= 1974 United States Senate election in South Carolina =

- November 5, 1974
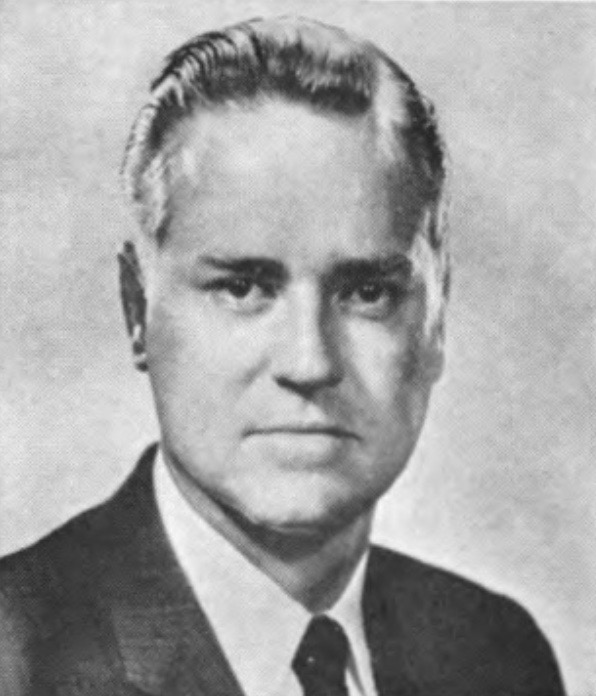

Nominee	Ernest Hollings	Gwen Bush
Party	Democratic	Republican
Popular vote	355,107	146,649
Percentage	69.44%	28.68%
- County results Hollings: 50–60% 60–70% 70–80% 80–90%
U.S. senator before election
Ernest Hollings
Democratic
Elected U.S. Senator
Ernest Hollings
Democratic

The 1974 South Carolina United States Senate election was held on November 5, 1974, to select the U.S. senator from the state of South Carolina. Incumbent Democratic Senator Fritz Hollings easily defeated Republican challenger Gwen Bush to win his third (his second full) term.

== Primaries ==
Both Fritz Hollings and Gwen Bush faced no opposition in their respective party's primaries, which allowed both candidates to concentrate solely on the general election.

== General election campaign ==
The Watergate scandal caused the Republicans to perform poorly nationwide in 1974, and Gwen Bush was little more than a sacrificial lamb. The main focus of the voters in South Carolina was on the competitive gubernatorial contest, and Fritz Hollings easily cruised to a re-election.

== General election results ==
South Carolina U.S. Senate election, 1974
Party	Candidate	Votes	%	±%
Democratic	Fritz Hollings (incumbent)	355,107	69.44%	+7.55%
Republican	Gwen Bush	146,649	28.68%	−9.43%
Independent	Harold Hough	9,624	1.88%	N/A
Majority		208,458	40.76%	+16.98%
Turnout		511,380	51.3%	−25.2%
Democratic hold				

== See also ==
- List of United States senators from South Carolina
- United States Senate elections, 1974 and 1975
- United States House of Representatives elections in South Carolina, 1974
- South Carolina gubernatorial election, 1974
