= Elizabeth Hawley Gasque =

American politician (1886–1989)

Elizabeth Hawley Gasque Van Exem
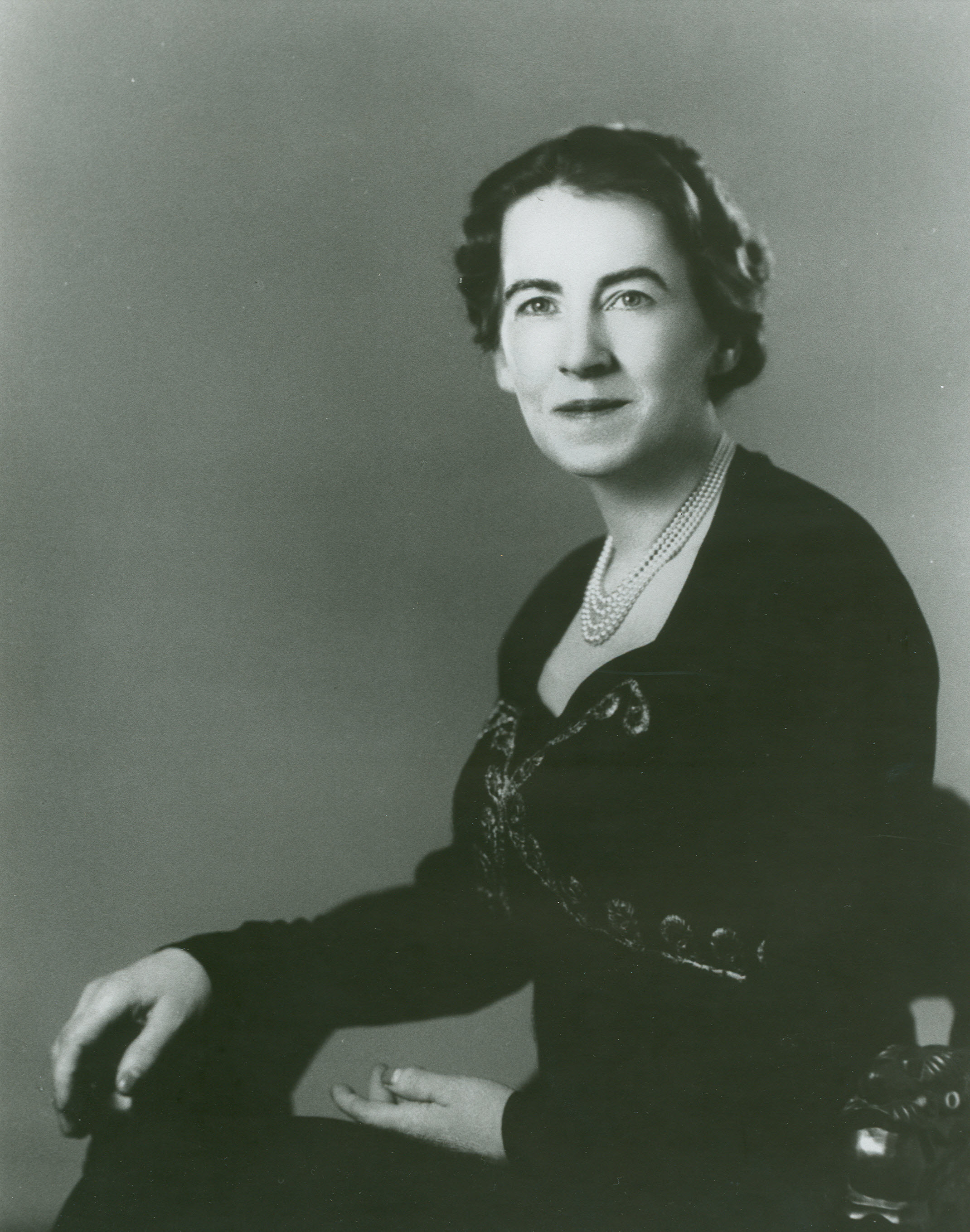
- Gasque c. 1938

Member of the U.S. House of Representatives from South Carolina's 6th district
- In office September 13, 1938 – January 3, 1939
- Preceded by: Allard Henry Gasque
- Succeeded by: John L. McMillan

Personal details
- Born: February 26, 1886 Blythewood, South Carolina, U.S.
- Died: November 2, 1989 (aged 103) Ridgeway, South Carolina, U.S.
- Party: Democratic
- Spouse: Allard H. Gasque
- Education: Greenville Woman's College

Elizabeth Gasque Van Exem (February 26, 1886 – November 2, 1989), named Elizabeth Hawley Gasque during her tenure in Congress, was an American politician who served as the U.S. representative for South Carolina's 6th congressional district from September 13, 1938, to January 3, 1939. She was the first woman elected to Congress from South Carolina.

At the age of 103 years, 249 days, Gasque is the longest-lived member of Congress ever, a record that still stands as of 2026.

== U.S. House of Representatives ==
Gasque was elected to the House of Representatives on September 13, 1938, to fill the vacancy caused by the death of her husband, Allard Henry Gasque. She never actually attended Congress, which was not in session during her months of office.

Gasque was not a candidate for renomination. After her tenure in Congress, she was an author and lecturer.

== Personal life and death ==
The Social Security death records state that Gasque was born in 1893, under her later married name of Van Exem. However, census records support the 1886 birth year.

Gasque died aged 103 in Ridgeway, South Carolina where she lived. She was the longest-lived member of Congress since Maurice Thatcher, who died in 1973.

In 1982, a section of South Carolina state road was named the Elizabeth Gasque Van Exem Highway.

== See also ==
- Women in the United States House of Representatives

== Sources ==
- United States Congress. "Elizabeth Hawley Gasque (id: G000093)". Biographical Directory of the United States Congress.

U.S. House of Representatives
Preceded by Allard Henry Gasque	Member of the U.S. House of Representatives from South Carolina's 6th congressional district September 13, 1938 – January 3, 1939	Succeeded by John L. McMillan
Honorary titles
Preceded by Carl Vinson	Oldest living U.S. representative (Sitting or former); June 1, 1981 – November 2, 1989	Succeeded by Hamilton Fish III
