= 1978 South Carolina gubernatorial election =

- November 7, 1978
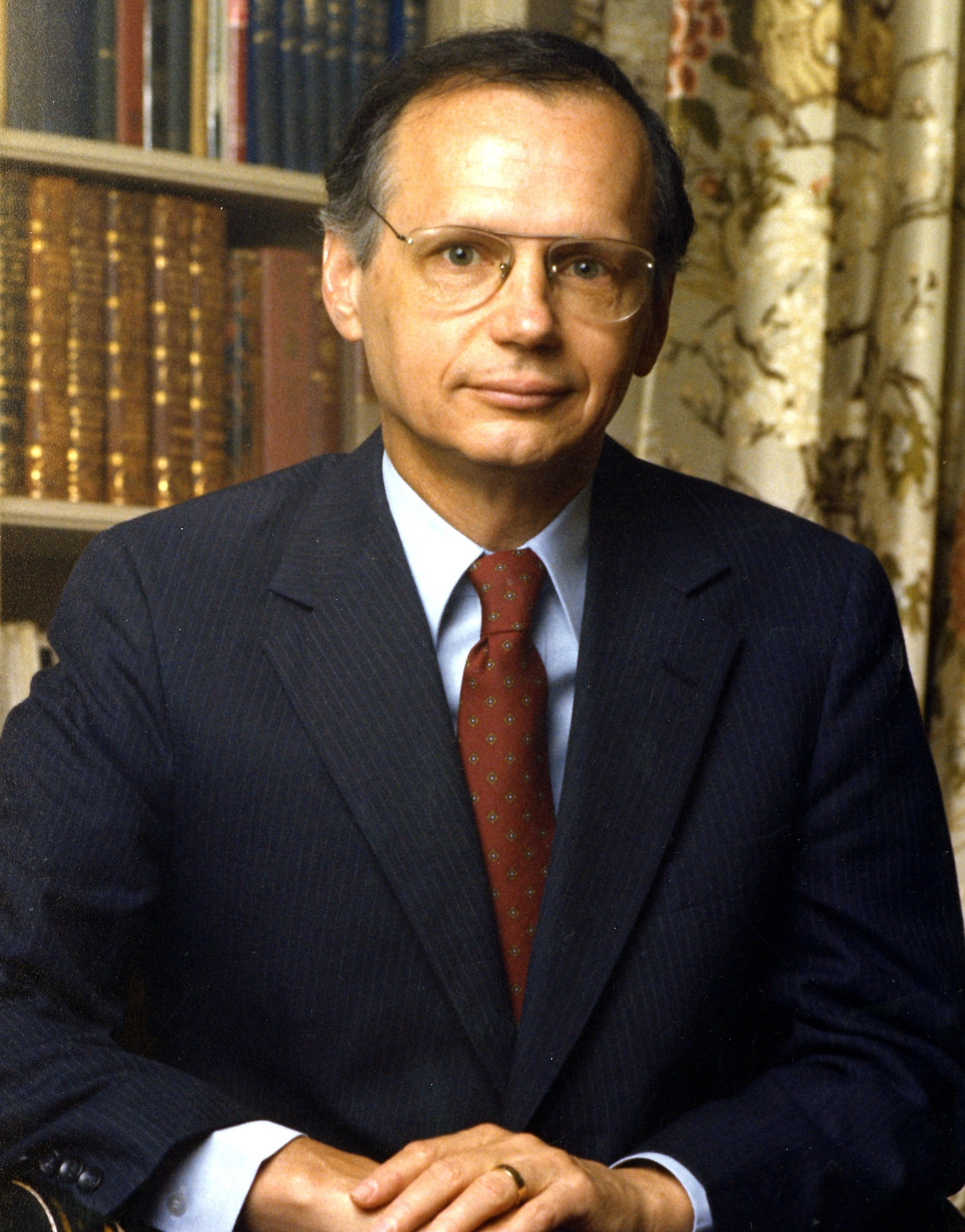

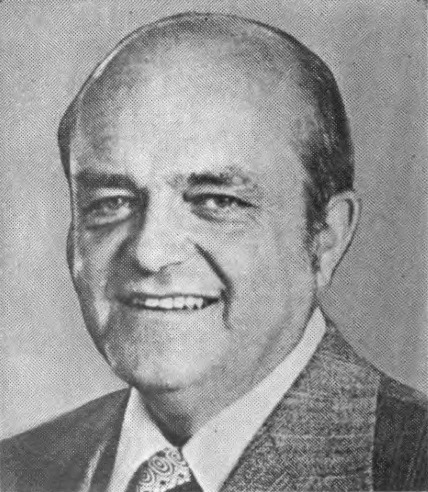
Nominee	Richard Riley	Edward Lunn Young
Party	Democratic	Republican
Popular vote	384,898	236,946
Percentage	61.33%	37.74%
- County results Riley: 50–60% 60–70% 70–80% Young: 50–60%
Governor before election
James B. Edwards
Republican
Elected Governor
Richard Riley
Democratic

The 1978 South Carolina gubernatorial election was held on November 7, 1978, to select the governor of the state of South Carolina. Richard Riley, the Democratic nominee, defeated Republican Edward Lunn Young and became the 111th governor of South Carolina.

== Democratic primary ==
The South Carolina Democratic Party held their primary for governor on June 13, featuring three high tier candidates. Richard Riley, a former member of the General Assembly, emerged as the winner of the runoff election over Lieutenant Governor W. Brantley Harvey Jr. on June 27.

Democratic Primary
Candidate	Votes	%
W. Brantley Harvey, Jr.	142,785	37.5
Richard Riley	125,184	32.9
William Jennings Bryan Dorn	112,793	29.6

Democratic Primary Runoff
Candidate	Votes	%	±%
Richard Riley	180,882	53.3	+20.4
W. Brantley Harvey, Jr.	158,655	46.7	+9.2

== Republican primary ==
The South Carolina Republican Party held their primary for governor on June 13. The race between Edward Lunn Young and Raymon Finch drew little interest compared to the Democratic primary and turnout for the Republican primary was less than that of 1974. Young defeated Finch in a close contest and earned the right to face Riley in the general election.

Republican Primary
Candidate	Votes	%
Edward Lunn Young	12,143	51.4
Raymon Finch	11,501	48.6

== General election ==
The general election was held on November 7, 1978, and Richard Riley was elected as the next governor of South Carolina. Turnout was higher than the previous gubernatorial election because of the increasingly competitive nature of the race between the two parties.

South Carolina Gubernatorial Election, 1978
Party	Candidate	Votes	%	±%
Democratic	Richard Riley	384,898	61.33	+14.3
Republican	Edward Lunn Young	236,946	37.74	−12.6
Independent	Judy Reynolds	5,338	0.9	−0.7
No party	Write-Ins	731	0.1	−1.0
Majority		147,952	23.6	+20.3
Turnout		627,913	57.2	+4.2
Democratic gain from Republican				

== See also ==
- Governor of South Carolina
- List of governors of South Carolina
- South Carolina gubernatorial elections

Preceded by 1974	South Carolina gubernatorial elections	Succeeded by 1982
