= Louis Effrat =

American journalist

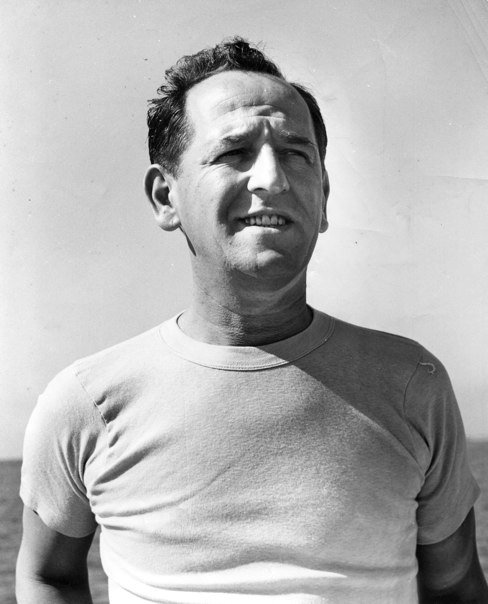
Louis Effrat

Louis Effrat (February 21, 1910 Manhattan – September 1, 1988) was a sports writer for The New York Times. He was employed by The New York Times from 1927 to 1976.

Mr. Effrat covered the first televised sport event, a Columbia–Princeton baseball game, the second game of a doubleheader, played at Baker Field at Columbia University on May 17, 1939.

Lou Effrat was known as "The Guy With the Twist". He covered all major sports. In addition to being the swing man between the Dodgers, Giants and Yankees, he spent years as the beat writer covering first the Yankees and then the Giants.

In addition to his baseball writing he covered the Knicks and the football Giants.

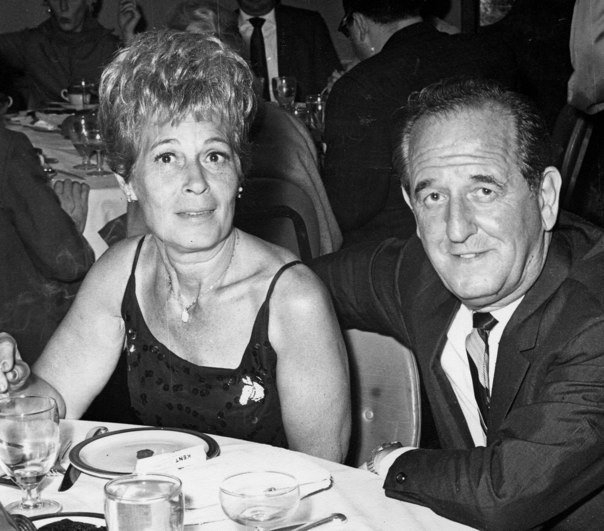
Effrat with his wife, Alice

In his later years he was the Harness Writer for the Times covering a number of Hambletonian Stakes. He was a member of the United States Harness Writers Association and voted into the Harness Racing Museum & Hall of Fame in 1985.

He retired to Florida with his wife, Alice, who died on May 19, 1997.
