= Robert Clarkson =

American tax protester (1947-2010)

Robert Barnwell Clarkson (June 4, 1947 – March 1, 2010) was an American tax protester in South Carolina.

== Early life ==
Clarkson was born in Camden, South Carolina, the son of James S. H. Clarkson, Jr. of Sumter, South Carolina and Frances Dargan Clarkson of Camden, South Carolina. He graduated Sumter High School (then known as Edmunds High School) in the class of 1965 and then graduated in 1969 from Clemson University with a bachelor of arts degree in economics. He served as a platoon leader in the Vietnam War. Clarkson graduated from South Carolina Law School in 1974.

== Lawyer misconduct ==
Clarkson was brought up on lawyer misconduct charges in 1976 and in 1977 was indicted on numerous accounts of preparing fraudulent tax returns and presenting false claims to the United States Department of the Treasury. In 1978, his lawyer misconduct hearings were concluded at the South Carolina State Supreme Court and he was disbarred.

According to the Southern Poverty Law Center, Clarkson had two federal tax-related criminal convictions. He was given a suspended sentence with five years probation, under the condition that he not become involved with income tax schemes.

== Parole violations ==
The following year, Clarkson violated his probation and was sent to federal prison. In 1984, he was again paroled on the condition that he not become involved with income tax schemes. He violated his parole the following year and once more was sent back to federal prison.

According to the Southern Poverty Law Center, Clarkson was involved with anti-government groups, and "sometimes dresses as 'The Great One, a sort of masked super-hero symbolizing resistance to the tax authorities." In 1989, Clarkson started an organization called the Carolina Patriots with two associates. They taught classes on how to evade Internal Revenue Service (IRS) demands. Numerous clients had legal problems after taking their advice.

== 1994 indictment and conviction ==
Early in 1994, a federal agent attended the class and, in April, Clarkson and two associates were indicted for conspiracy to impede, impair, obstruct and defeat the functions of the Internal Revenue Service under 18 U.S.C. § 371. All three were convicted and the convictions were upheld on appeal. They were sentenced to 57 months in prison. Clarkson was released from prison in April 1999.

In affirming the conviction of Clarkson and his co-defendants, the United States Court of Appeals for the Fourth Circuit rejected his argument that he had a First Amendment right in connection with certain tax protest-related speeches held at various meetings:

The defendants' words and acts were not remote from the commission of the criminal acts. The evidence shows that the defendants held meetings and collected money from attendees whom they instructed and advised to claim unlawful exemptions and not to file income tax returns or pay tax on wages in violation of the United States Tax Code. The evidence shows that the attendees followed the instruction and advice of the defendants, that the attendees' unlawful actions were solicited by the defendants, and that the defendants were aware that the attendees were following their instructions and advice. The evidence discloses that a purpose of the meetings was to encourage people to unlawful actions by convincing them that it was legal to claim false exemptions, to hide income, and to refuse to file income tax returns or pay income tax [...] We conclude that no reasonable juror could conclude that the defendants' words and actions were merely advocating opposition to the income tax laws.

Following his release from prison, Clarkson co-founded an organization called the Patriot Network. He held tax protester meetings and sold books that claimed to teach individuals how to avoid paying taxes.

== 2004 sentencing ==
In May 2004, the South Carolina Supreme Court ruled that Clarkson had engaged in the unauthorized practice of law and held that Clarkson was guilty of criminal contempt. He was sentenced to six months in jail. The sentence was suspended for five years, however, on three conditions: firstly, that Clarkson and the South Carolina Office of Disciplinary Counsel submit to the Court an agreed-upon disclaimer stating that Clarkson is not an attorney and is not licensed to practice law in South Carolina or in any other state; secondly, that Clarkson file an affidavit stating that the disclaimer has been prominently and permanently placed on any and all of his websites and on all literature authored and/or published by Clarkson; and thirdly, that Clarkson no longer engage in the unauthorized practice of law.

In 2005, the U.S. Department of Justice (DOJ) filed a lawsuit requesting an injunction against Clarkson in a U.S. District Court in South Carolina, asking that the court bar Clarkson from selling his tax schemes and holding classes. The department also asked that the court require Clarkson to hand over the names and addresses of his clients. The requested permanent injunction was issued in July 2007. According to a news release by the U.S. Department of Justice on July 3, 2007, the court "found that Clarkson falsely instructed Patriot Network members that they need not file federal income tax returns. The court also held that Clarkson helped members obstruct IRS efforts to collect taxes." Clarkson was also ordered "to give copies of the injunction to people who bought his products and to post the injunction on the Patriot Network Web site."

== 2008 arrest ==
On September 16, 2008, Clarkson and his wife were arrested in their home town of Anderson, South Carolina and each was charged with criminal domestic violence. In a court hearing on September 17, Clarkson pleaded not guilty and accused his wife of becoming hooked on drugs he said he had given to her. Clarkson stated that he had given his wife cocaine because of "chronic fatigue." A few days later, Clarkson was again arrested and was charged with violating a trespass order, unlawful use of the "911" emergency phone service, and first-degree harassment.

== Death ==
Clarkson died on March 1, 2010.
