= Thomas F. Hartnett =

American politician

Tommy Hartnett
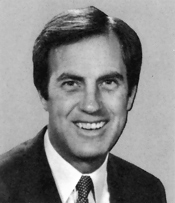
- Official portrait, 1985

Member of the U.S. House of Representatives from South Carolina's 1st district
- In office January 3, 1981 – January 3, 1987
- Preceded by: Mendel Davis
- Succeeded by: Arthur Ravenel

Member of the South Carolina Senate from the 16th district
- In office 1972–1980
- Preceded by: J. Kenneth Rentiers
- Succeeded by: W. Paul Cantrell Jr.

Member of the South Carolina House of Representatives from Charleston County
- In office 1964–1972

Personal details
- Born: Thomas Forbes Hartnett; August 7, 1941 (age 85) Charleston, South Carolina, United States
- Party: Democratic (until 1972); Republican (since 1972)
- Spouse: Bonnie Lee Kennerly (m. 1965)
- Children: 2, including Tom
- Education: College of Charleston (attended)

Military service
- Branch/service: United States Air Force; Air Force Reserve; Air National Guard
- Years of service: 1963‍–‍1969 (AFR); 1981‍–‍1987 (ANG)
- Unit: South Carolina Air National Guard

Thomas Forbes "Tommy" Hartnett (born August 7, 1941) is a former American politician who served as a U.S. representative from South Carolina.

== Early life, education and career ==
Hartnett was born in Charleston. He graduated from Bishop England High School in Charleston in 1960. He attended the College of Charleston from 1960 to 1961 and was in the United States Air Force Reserve from 1963 to 1969 and South Carolina Air National Guard from 1981 to 1987.

== Political career ==
=== South Carolina House ===
In 1964, Hartnett was elected to the South Carolina House of Representatives from a Charleston-area district. He served four terms in that body. Originally a Democrat, he became a Republican in 1972, and attended that year's state Republican convention (and every convention after that until 1980). He was a delegate to every Republican National Convention from 1980 to 2000.

=== South Carolina Senate ===
He was elected to the South Carolina Senate in 1972 and served two terms.

=== US House of Representatives ===
In 1980, Hartnett won the Republican nomination for the Charleston-based 1st District after five-term incumbent Mendel Jackson Davis retired due to back problems. He narrowly defeated his Democratic opponent, Associate Deputy Commerce Secretary Charles D. Ravenel, becoming the first Republican to win an undisputed election in the district since Reconstruction. Hartnett likely owed his win to Ronald Reagan winning Charleston County with 55% of the vote. The district had also been trending Republican for some time at the national level; it has only supported the Democratic candidate for president once since 1956, when Jimmy Carter carried it in 1976. But conservative Democrats continued to hold most of the district's seats in the state legislature, as well as most local offices, well into the 1990s.

Hartnett was convincingly reelected in 1982, and took 61% of the vote in 1984. He gave up his seat in 1986 to run for lieutenant governor, narrowly losing to Democratic State Senator Nick Theodore. He then became a real estate agent, founding Hartnett Realty in his hometown of Mount Pleasant.

=== United States Senate ===
Hartnett came out of retirement in 1992 to run for the United States Senate against four-term incumbent and fellow Charleston resident Ernest Hollings. He gave Hollings his closest race ever, losing by only three percentage points in a very good year for Democrats nationally.

== Personal life ==
Hartnett lives in Mount Pleasant and is chairman of the family-owned Hartnett Realty. The firm was created in 1947 by Catherine Forbes Hartnett and is one of the oldest Charleston real estate firms. His son, Tom Hartnett Jr., currently serves in the South Carolina House of Representatives.

== Sources ==
- United States Congress. "Thomas F. Hartnett (id: H000302)". Biographical Directory of the United States Congress.
- Appearances on C-SPAN

U.S. House of Representatives
Preceded by Mendel Davis	Member of the U.S. House of Representatives from South Carolina's 1st congressional district 1981–1987	Succeeded by Arthur Ravenel
Party political offices
Preceded by Norma C. Russell	Republican nominee for Lieutenant Governor of South Carolina; 1986	Succeeded by Henry McMaster
Preceded by Henry McMaster	Republican nominee for U.S. Senator from South Carolina (Class 3); 1992	Succeeded by Bob Inglis
U.S. order of precedence (ceremonial)
Preceded by David Trone as Former U.S. Representative	Order of precedence of the United States as Former U.S. Representative	Succeeded by Mick Mulvaney as Former U.S. Representative
