= Kenneth Lamar Holland =

American politician and attorney (1934–2021)

Ken Holland
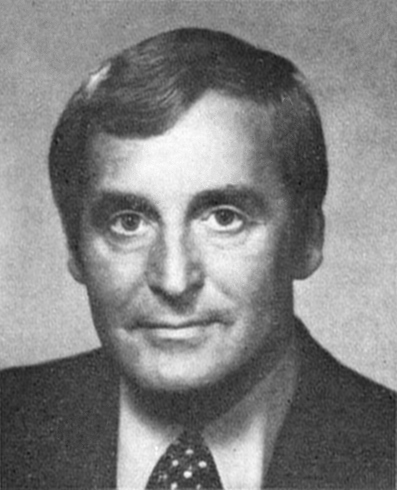

Member of the U.S. House of Representatives from South Carolina's 5th district
- In office January 3, 1975 – January 3, 1983
- Preceded by: Thomas S. Gettys
- Succeeded by: John M. Spratt, Jr.

Member of the South Carolina Highway Commission
- In office 1972–1975

Chairman of the South Carolina State Board of Municipal Canvassers
- In office 1971–1973

Personal details
- Born: November 24, 1934 Hickory, North Carolina, U.S.
- Died: February 27, 2021 (aged 86) Richmond, Virginia, U.S.
- Party: Democratic
- Children: 3
- Education: University of South Carolina (A.B., L.L.B.)

Kenneth Lamar Holland (November 24, 1934 – February 27, 2021) was an American politician and attorney who as the Democratic member of the United States House of Representatives from South Carolina between 1975 until 1983.

== Early life ==
Holland was born in Hickory, North Carolina. He attended public schools in Gaffney, South Carolina and served in the National Guard from 1952 to 1959. He entered college at the University of South Carolina, earning an AB in 1960 and an LL.B. in 1963. During his time at the university, Holland was a member of the Euphradian Society. He was admitted to the South Carolina bar in 1963 and began the practice of law in Camden, South Carolina.

== Political career ==
He served as a delegate to the South Carolina State Democratic conventions from 1968 to 1972. He was a delegate to the Democratic National Convention in 1968. From 1971 to 1973, Holland worked as a member of the State Board of Municipal Canvassers, serving as the body's chairman. He then served on the state Highway Commission from 1972 to 1975.

He was elected as a Democratic candidate from South Carolina's Fifth Congressional District to the 94th (and to the three following) Congresses, serving from January 3, 1975, to January 3, 1983. Holland's 1976 re-election was by a close (51% to 48%) margin over the Republican Party candidate, South Carolina Gamecocks baseball coach and former Major League Baseball player Bobby Richardson. Holland was not a candidate for reelection in 1982, to the 98th Congress, instead choosing to return to work as a lawyer. Holland was succeeded in Congress by John M. Spratt, Jr.

Holland indicated on February 7, 2006, that he was planning on entering the Democratic primary for the 2006 race for Governor of South Carolina but then dropped out a month later, citing money problems and pledging to refund the contributions he had received to date.

== Death ==
Holland died on February 27, 2021, at the age of 86, in Richmond, Virginia.

U.S. House of Representatives
Preceded by Thomas S. Gettys	Member of the U.S. House of Representatives from South Carolina's 5th congressional district 1975–1983	Succeeded by John M. Spratt, Jr.
