= John Jenrette =

American politician (1936–2023)

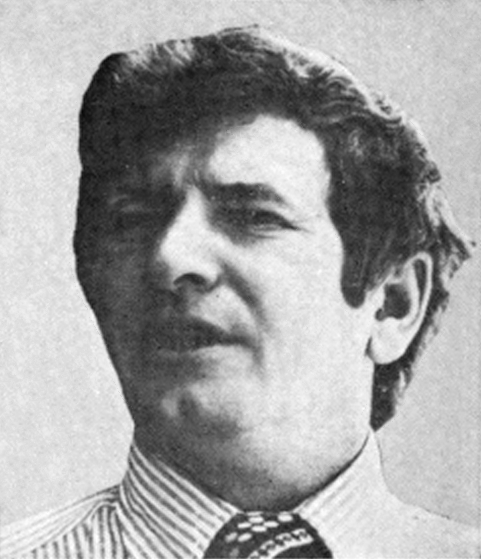
- Jenrette in 1975

Member of the U.S. House of Representatives from South Carolina's 6th district
- In office January 3, 1975 – December 10, 1980
- Preceded by: Edward Lunn Young
- Succeeded by: John Light Napier

Member of the South Carolina House of Representatives from the Horry County district
- In office 1964–1972
- Preceded by: Multi-member district
- Succeeded by: Constituency abolished

Personal details
- Born: John Wilson Jenrette Jr. May 19, 1936 Conway, South Carolina, U.S.
- Died: March 17, 2023 (aged 86) Conway, South Carolina, U.S.
- Party: Democratic
- Spouses: Sarah Jordan (m. 1960; div. 1975); Rita Carpenter (m. 1976; div. 1981); Rosemary Long (m. 1992)
- Relations: Scott Bessent (nephew)
- Children: 2
- Education: Wofford College (BA); University of South Carolina (LLB)

John Wilson Jenrette Jr. (May 19, 1936 – March 17, 2023) was an American lawyer, businessman, and politician from South Carolina. He was in the United States House of Representatives as a Democrat from January 1975 until December 1980, when he was convicted of accepting a bribe in the FBI's Abscam sting operation, and served more than a year in prison.

== Early life ==
Jenrette was born in Conway, South Carolina, in 1936, the son of Mary Herring and John Wilson Jenrette. He grew up in Loris, South Carolina. He was a descendant of French Huguenot refugees who settled in northeastern South Carolina in the 1700s. He is also the uncle of Scott Bessent, the 79th U.S. Secretary of the Treasury.

Jenrette graduated from Loris High School, where he was a three-sport athletic star, in 1954. He then earned a B.A. at Wofford College in 1958. He served on active duty as a U.S. Army officer and then served several years in the South Carolina National Guard. After graduating from law school at the University of South Carolina in 1962, he founded an influential law firm in Ocean Drive, which soon became part of the newly formed City of North Myrtle Beach.

== South Carolina House of Representatives ==
Jenrette was elected to the South Carolina House of Representatives as a Democrat in 1964, where he represented Horry County, South Carolina, which includes Myrtle Beach. He retired from the state house to run for a seat in the U.S. House in 1972. While in the state legislature, he spearheaded the transformation of a small two-year University of South Carolina branch into a full-service four-year college that is now Coastal Carolina University. He initiated the effort to convert the old post office building in Columbia into a facility for the State Supreme Court, and persuaded the U.S. Air Force to allow commercial air traffic at the Myrtle Beach Air Force Base. This marked the beginning of what is now Myrtle Beach International Airport.

== U.S. House of Representatives ==
In the 1972 contest Jenrette defeated the seventeen-term Congressman John L. McMillan in the primary, but lost the general election to the Republican, Edward Lunn Young. Undaunted, he again ran for the seat in 1974. This time he won, in part because of the extreme unpopularity of Republican Richard Nixon and the Watergate scandal.

Jenrette was fairly liberal by South Carolina standards of the time. He seemed out of place representing a rather conservative and mostly rural congressional district in northeastern South Carolina. However, he was locally well-known and benefited from enthusiastic African-American support. Additionally, the South Carolina Republican Party was not especially well-organized at the time in that part of the state. Jenrette performed well in his first two years in Congress and easily defeated Young again in 1976. In 1978, he received only token primary opposition and faced no major-party opposition.

Jenrette was selected to join the House Majority leadership team as a Deputy Whip shortly after arriving in Washington in 1975, and he served on the Democratic leadership team as a Deputy Whip for all six years he served in Congress. He served first on the House Agriculture Committee and then on the prestigious House Appropriations Committee. He was the founder and first Chairman of the Congressional Travel and Tourism Caucus. Jenrette placed great emphasis on constituent service, and he and his staff were widely recognized as the most responsive office the Sixth District had ever seen. Among his many constituent services was securing federal funding for a high span bridge over the Sampit River in Georgetown, South Carolina, allowing sea-going vessels to travel upstream. Jenrette was the first Member of Congress to endorse Jimmy Carter for president. Carter campaigned in South Carolina for Jenrette, and Jenrette campaigned for Carter in South Carolina and elsewhere, and persuaded a large number of congressional colleagues to support Carter during the nominating process.

Jenrette is most famous for two things during his days as a congressman. First, he allegedly had sex with his then-wife, actress and model Rita Jenrette, behind a pillar on the steps of the Capitol Building during a break in a late night session of Congress (the comedy group "Capitol Steps" takes its name from this escapade). Rita later posed nude in Playboy and published a tell-all memoir.

Second, he was charged with and convicted of accepting a bribe in the FBI sting operation known as Abscam which was conducted in 1980. He was recorded saying he had been given a cash loan by an associate. Jenrette was sentenced to two years in prison, of which he served 13 months.

== Later life ==
Jenrette was defeated for re-election in 1980 and resigned from Congress on December 10, just days before the end of his term. He subsequently ran a public relations firm called Lehuguenot, Ltd., in Myrtle Beach and developed property in nearby Cherry Grove.

His wife, Rita, separated from him in January 1981 and they divorced later the same year. He later became a developer of major coastal property in North Myrtle Beach, and lived with his third wife Rosemary in a beachfront home in Myrtle Beach.

=== Biographical book ===
In 2017, the book Capitol Steps and Missteps: The Wild, Improbable Ride of Congressman John Jenrette was published. It was written by two of Jenrette's former aides, John F. Clark and Cookie Miller VanSice. While promoting the book, Jenrette described his years since Congress as including "marketing an experimental balloon-operated flotation device; running (and then folding) a national chain of timeshares; breeding horses in Bulgaria; and selling Phillip Morris cigarettes in Eastern Europe immediately after the fall of the Soviet Union". He also imported wine from Hungary and antique furniture from Eastern Europe.

=== Death ===
After several years of declining health, Jenrette died in Conway on March 17, 2023, at the age of 86. South Carolina congressman James Clyburn issued a statement of tribute following Jenrette's death.

== See also ==
- List of American federal politicians convicted of crimes
- List of federal political scandals in the United States

== Sources ==
- ""Destination Scandal" tour of DC". The Washington Post.
- The Hill, May 29, 2002
- The Post and Courier (Charleston, SC), November 17, 1999
- The Post and Courier (Charleston, SC), July 22, 2000

"Capitol Steps and Missteps; The Wild, Improbable Ride of Congressman John Jenrette," by John F. Clark and Cookie Miller VanSice, 2017.

U.S. House of Representatives
Preceded by Edward Lunn Young	Member of the U.S. House of Representatives from South Carolina's 6th congressional district 1975–1980	Succeeded by John Light Napier
