= Edward Lunn Young =

American politician (1920–2017)

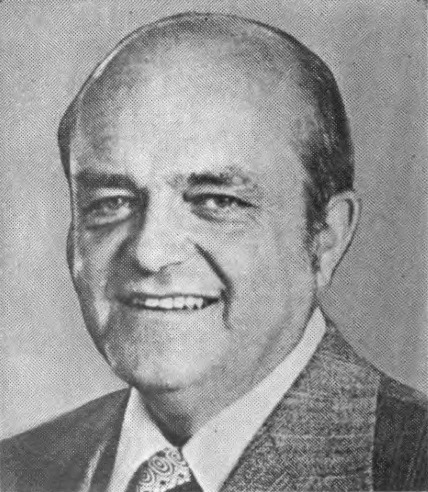

Member of the U.S. House of Representatives from South Carolina's 6th district
- In office January 3, 1973 – January 3, 1975
- Preceded by: John L. McMillan
- Succeeded by: John Jenrette

Member of the South Carolina House of Representatives from Florence County
- In office 1958–1960 Serving with Barnard Daly Dusenbury, George Sam Harrell, Eugene LeRoy Nettles, Cyril Ray Parrott
- Preceded by: Philip Benjamin Finklea
- Succeeded by: Peter DeWitt Hyman; W. Odell Venters; Eugene Noel Zeigler

Personal details
- Born: September 7, 1920 Florence, South Carolina, U.S.
- Died: May 9, 2017 (aged 96) Florence, South Carolina, U.S.
- Party: Democratic (until early 1960s); Republican (after early 1960s)
- Education: Clemson College
- Awards: Distinguished Flying Cross; Air Medal with nine Oak Leaf Clusters

Military service
- Branch/service: United States Army Air Corps; United States Army Reserves
- Years of service: 1941–1946
- Rank: Major

Edward Lunn Young (September 7, 1920 – May 9, 2017) was an American politician. He served in the South Carolina House of Representatives representing Florence County from 1958 to 1960 as a member of the Democratic Party. Later changing to the Republican Party, he served in the United States House of Representatives for South Carolina's 6th congressional district from 1973 to 1975.

== Early life ==
Young was born in Florence, South Carolina. He graduated from Clemson College (now Clemson University) in 1941. Not long after graduating, he joined the United States Army Air Forces and served as a fighter pilot in the Pacific during the last part of World War II. He was awarded the Distinguished Flying Cross and the Air Medal with nine oak leaf clusters.

After World War II, he stayed in the reserves for one year and was discharged as a major. He then returned to Florence and worked as a farmer, real estate broker and businessman.

== Career ==
Young was elected to the South Carolina House of Representatives as a Democrat from Florence County in 1958 and served one term. He became a Republican sometime in the early 1960s and was active in state Republican politics, attending the state Republican conventions of 1968 and 1970. He was also a delegate to the 1968 Republican National Convention.

In 1972, Young won the Republican primary nomination for South Carolina's 6th congressional district, in the state's northeast corner. He expected to face 17-term Democratic incumbent John L. McMillan, the longest-serving congressman in South Carolina history, in the general election. However, in a considerable upset, McMillan was defeated in the Democratic primary by a considerably more liberal candidate, State Representative John Jenrette. Due to the gigantic Republican landslide of that year, Young won the general election by over nine points, becoming the first Republican in history to represent this part of South Carolina.

Young's tenure in Congress was short-lived, however. The Republican Party did not have strong roots in this part of the state at the time, so Young was particularly vulnerable in the 1974 elections, which saw a nationwide backlash against Republicans due to Watergate. Jenrette sought a rematch against Young, and this time won by four points. Another rematch in 1976 resulted in Young being soundly defeated.

Young was the Republican candidate for Governor in 1978, but was soundly defeated by Democratic State Senator Richard Riley. When Jenrette was ensnared by Abscam in 1980, Young jumped into the Republican primary, only to be soundly defeated by John Light Napier, who went on to defeat Jenrette in November.

== Later life and death ==
After his 1980 defeat, Young retired from politics. He died in his sleep on May 9, 2017.

== Sources ==
- United States Congress. "Edward Lunn Young (id: Y000035)". Biographical Directory of the United States Congress.

U.S. House of Representatives
Preceded by John L. McMillan	Member of the U.S. House of Representatives from South Carolina's 6th congressional district 1973–1975	Succeeded by John Jenrette
Party political offices
Preceded by James B. Edwards	Republican nominee for Governor of South Carolina; 1978	Succeeded by W. D. Workman Jr.
