= Mendel Jackson Davis =

American politician (1942–2007)

Mendel J. Davis
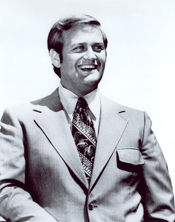

Member of the U.S. House of Representatives from South Carolina's 1st district
- In office April 27, 1971 – January 3, 1981
- Preceded by: L. Mendel Rivers
- Succeeded by: Thomas F. Hartnett

Personal details
- Born: Mendel Jackson Davis; October 23, 1942 North Charleston, South Carolina
- Died: May 13, 2007 (aged 64) Charleston, South Carolina
- Party: Democratic
- Spouse: Jane McGee Smith Davis

Mendel Jackson Davis (October 23, 1942 – May 13, 2007) was an attorney and a United States representative from South Carolina.

== Early life and career ==
Mendel Jackson Davis was born in North Charleston to Felix Charles Davis and Elizabeth Jackson Davis. He was raised in Garco Village and graduated from North Charleston High School in 1960 where he participated in sports and student government.

Three days after graduating from high school, Davis went to work in the office of Congressman L. Mendel Rivers, his godfather and namesake. While serving as an assistant to Rivers, Davis obtained a degree in history from the College of Charleston in 1966 and later graduated from the University of South Carolina School of Law.

== Political career ==
Rivers died in Birmingham during a heart surgery operation in December 1970, almost two months after being elected to a 16th term.

=== Congress ===
Davis ran in the ensuing special election to replace Rivers for the 1st congressional district, which centered around Charleston and spread along the southern portion of the state's Atlantic coastline from Jasper County to Georgetown County. The close ties between Davis and Rivers enabled Davis to defeat future governor James B. Edwards by 5,100 votes in the district's first competitive election in memory. He was held to 54% of the vote in his bid for a full term in 1972, but was reelected three more times without serious difficulty.

In Congress, Davis worked to create comprehensive health care for the district and to increase the minimum wage. He was the sponsor of a bill that brought the Yorktown aircraft carrier to Patriot's Point. He was also a member of the House Leadership Committee that brought about the resignation of Richard Nixon. Davis's voting record was typical of a Southern Democrat. He tallied a high rating from the American Conservative Union for his first year in office, but it steadily declined thereafter.

== Later life and career ==
In 1980, Davis declined to seek reelection because of a recurring back problem. The Republicans took the seat as part of the Reagan landslide, and held it until Joe Cunningham regained it for the Democrats in 2018.

Davis returned to Charleston to practice law, perform consultant work, host a radio talk show, and serve as chairman of the Charleston County Democratic Party. He tried to regain his congressional seat in 1985, but lost to Jimmy Stuckey in the Democratic primary. For his efforts to bring the Yorktown to Patriot's Point, Davis was honored by having a traffic circle near the aircraft carrier named in his honor. He died on May 13, 2007, after being disabled for several years by emphysema.

== Death ==
Davis died on May 13, 2007 at the age of 64.

== See also ==
- List of members of the House Un-American Activities Committee

U.S. House of Representatives
Preceded by L. Mendel Rivers	Member of the U.S. House of Representatives from South Carolina's 1st congressional district April 27, 1971 – January 3, 1981	Succeeded by Thomas F. Hartnett
