= Earl House =

Earl House may refer to:

- Thomas Earl House (Napa, California), listed on the National Register of Historic Places in Napa County, California
- Thomas Earl House (Ann Arbor, Michigan), listed on the National Register of Historic Places in Washtenaw County, Michigan
- Vienna and Earl Apartment Buildings, St. Paul, Minnesota, listed on the NRHP in Minnesota
- Jephtha Earl Cobblestone Farmhouse, Benton, New York, listed on the NRHP in Yates County, New York
- Earl-Rochelle House, Texarkana, Texas, listed on the National Register of Historic Places in Bowie County, Texas

== See also ==
- Thomas Earl House (disambiguation)
- Earle House (disambiguation)
