= List of former United States representatives (E) =

This is a complete list of former United States representatives whose last names begin with the letter E.

== Number of years and terms the member has served ==
The number of years the representative/delegate has served in Congress indicates the number of terms the representative/delegate has. Note the representative/delegate can also serve non-consecutive terms if the representative/delegate loses election and wins re-election to the House.

- 2 years - 1 or 2 terms
- 4 years - 2 or 3 terms
- 6 years - 3 or 4 terms
- 8 years - 4 or 5 terms
- 10 years - 5 or 6 terms
- 12 years - 6 or 7 terms
- 14 years - 7 or 8 terms
- 16 years - 8 or 9 terms
- 18 years - 9 or 10 terms
- 20 years - 10 or 11 terms
- 22 years - 11 or 12 terms
- 24 years - 12 or 13 terms
- 26 years - 13 or 14 terms
- 28 years - 14 or 15 terms
- 30 years - 15 or 16 terms
- 32 years - 16 or 17 terms
- 34 years - 17 or 18 terms
- 36 years - 18 or 19 terms
- 38 years - 19 or 20 terms
- 40 years - 20 or 21 terms
- 42 years - 21 or 22 terms
- 44 years - 22 or 23 terms
- 46 years - 23 or 24 terms
- 48 years - 24 or 25 terms
- 50 years - 25 or 26 terms
- 52 years - 26 or 27 terms
- 54 years - 27 or 28 terms
- 56 years - 28 or 29 terms
- 58 years - 29 or 30 terms

Name	Term	State/ Territory	Party	Lifespan
John J. Eagan	1913–1921; 1923–1925	New Jersey	Democratic	1872–1956
Samuel W. Eager	1830–1831	New York	National Republican	1789–1860
Joe H. Eagle	1913–1921; 1933–1937	Texas	Democratic	1870–1963
Benjamin T. Eames	1871–1879	Rhode Island	Republican	1818–1901
Daniel S. Earhart	1936–1937	Ohio	Democratic	1907–1976
Elias Earle	1805–1807; 1811–1815; 1817–1821	South Carolina	Democratic-Republican	1762–1823
John B. Earle	1803–1805	South Carolina	Democratic-Republican	1766–1836
Samuel Earle	1795–1797	South Carolina	Democratic-Republican	1760–1833
Jonas Earll Jr.	1827–1831	New York	Democratic	1786–1846
Nehemiah H. Earll	1839–1841	New York	Democratic	1787–1872
Joseph D. Early	1975–1993	Massachusetts	Democratic	1933–2012
Peter Early	1803–1807	Georgia	Democratic-Republican	1773–1817
Manuel Earnshaw	1913–1917	Philippines	None	1862–1936
Harold Earthman	1945–1947	Tennessee	Democratic	1900–1987
Ben C. Eastman	1851–1855	Wisconsin	Democratic	1812–1856
Ira Allen Eastman	1839–1843	New Hampshire	Democratic	1809–1881
Nehemiah Eastman	1825–1827	New Hampshire	National Republican	1782–1856
Rufus Easton	1814–1816	Missouri	None	1774–1834
Charles Aubrey Eaton	1925–1953	New Jersey	Republican	1868–1953
Lewis Eaton	1823–1825	New York	Democratic-Republican	1790–1857
Thomas M. Eaton	1939	California	Republican	1896–1939
William R. Eaton	1929–1933	Colorado	Republican	1877–1942
William W. Eaton	1883–1885	Connecticut	Democratic	1816–1898
Herman P. Eberharter	1937–1958	Pennsylvania	Democratic	1892–1958
Leonard S. Echols	1919–1923	West Virginia	Republican	1871–1946
Dennis E. Eckart	1981–1993	Ohio	Democratic	1950–present
Charles R. Eckert	1935–1939	Pennsylvania	Democratic	1868–1959
Fred J. Eckert	1985–1987	New York	Republican	1941–present
George Nicholas Eckert	1847–1849	Pennsylvania	Whig	1802–1865
Bob Eckhardt	1967–1981	Texas	Democratic	1913–2001
Ephraim R. Eckley	1863–1869	Ohio	Republican	1811–1908
Frank Eddy	1895–1903	Minnesota	Republican	1856–1929
Norman Eddy	1853–1855	Indiana	Democratic	1810–1872
Samuel Eddy	1819–1825	Rhode Island	Democratic-Republican	1769–1839
Morris Michael Edelstein	1940–1941	New York	Democratic	1888–1941
John R. Eden	1863–1865; 1873–1879; 1885–1887	Illinois	Democratic	1826–1909
Bob Edgar	1975–1987	Pennsylvania	Democratic	1943–2013
Alfred Peck Edgerton	1851–1855	Ohio	Democratic	1813–1897
Joseph K. Edgerton	1863–1865	Indiana	Democratic	1818–1893
Sidney Edgerton	1859–1863	Ohio	Republican	1818–1900
John Rufus Edie	1855–1857	Pennsylvania	Oppositionist	1814–1888
John Rufus Edie	1857–1859	Pennsylvania	Republican	1814–1888
J. Wiley Edmands	1853–1855	Massachusetts	Whig	1809–1877
Andrew Edmiston Jr.	1933–1943	West Virginia	Democratic	1892–1966
William Edmond	1797–1801	Connecticut	Federalist	1755–1838
George W. Edmonds	1913–1925; 1933–1935	Pennsylvania	Republican	1864–1939
Ed Edmondson	1953–1973	Oklahoma	Democratic	1919–1990
Paul C. Edmunds	1889–1895	Virginia	Democratic	1836–1899
Henry A. Edmundson	1849–1861	Virginia	Democratic	1814–1890
Joseph E. Edsall	1845–1849	New Jersey	Democratic	1789–1865
Benjamin Edwards	1795	Maryland	Pro-Administration	1753–1829
Caldwell Edwards	1901–1903	Montana	Populist	1841–1922
Charles G. Edwards	1907–1917; 1925–1931	Georgia	Democratic	1878–1931
Chet Edwards	1991–2011	Texas	Democratic	1951–present
Don Edwards	1963–1995	California	Democratic	1915–2015
Don C. Edwards	1905–1911	Kentucky	Republican	1861–1938
Donna Edwards	2008–2017	Maryland	Democratic	1958–present
Edwin Edwards	1965–1972	Louisiana	Democratic	1927–2021
Francis S. Edwards	1855–1857	New York	American	1817–1899
Henry W. Edwards	1819–1823	Connecticut	Democratic-Republican	1779–1847
Jack Edwards	1965–1985	Alabama	Republican	1928–2019
John Edwards	1837–1839	New York	Democratic	1781–1850
John Edwards	1839–1841	Pennsylvania	Anti-Masonic	1786–1843
John Edwards	1841–1843	Pennsylvania	Whig	1786–1843
John Edwards	1871–1872	Arkansas	Liberal Republican	1805–1894
John C. Edwards	1841–1843	Missouri	Democratic	1804–1888
Mickey Edwards	1977–1993	Oklahoma	Republican	1937–present
Samuel Edwards	1819–1825	Pennsylvania	Federalist	1785–1850
Samuel Edwards	1825–1827	Pennsylvania	Democratic	1785–1850
Thomas M. Edwards	1859–1863	New Hampshire	Republican	1795–1875
Thomas O. Edwards	1847–1849	Ohio	Whig	1810–1876
Weldon Nathaniel Edwards	1816–1825	North Carolina	Democratic-Republican	1788–1873
Weldon Nathaniel Edwards	1825–1827	North Carolina	Democratic	1788–1873
William P. Edwards	1868–1869	Georgia	Republican	1835–1900
Valentine Efner	1835–1837	New York	Democratic	1776–1865
Albert Gallatin Egbert	1875–1877	Pennsylvania	Democratic	1828–1896
Joseph Egbert	1841–1843	New York	Democratic	1807–1888
George Ege	1796–1797	Pennsylvania	Federalist	1748–1829
Benjamin Eggleston	1865–1869	Ohio	Republican	1816–1888
Joseph Eggleston	1798–1801	Virginia	Democratic-Republican	1754–1811
Vern Ehlers	1993–2011	Michigan	Republican	1934–2017
Bob Ehrlich	1995–2003	Maryland	Republican	1957–present
Edward C. Eicher	1933–1938	Iowa	Democratic	1878–1944
Anthony Eickhoff	1877–1879	New York	Democratic	1827–1901
Joshua Eilberg	1967–1979	Pennsylvania	Democratic	1921–2004
Edwin Einstein	1879–1881	New York	Republican	1842–1905
William A. Ekwall	1935–1937	Oregon	Republican	1887–1956
Jacob Hart Ela	1867–1871	New Hampshire	Republican	1820–1884
Joseph Barton Elam	1877–1881	Louisiana	Democratic	1821–1885
James Walter Elder	1913–1915	Louisiana	Democratic	1882–1941
Charles A. Eldredge	1863–1875	Wisconsin	Democratic	1820–1896
Nathaniel B. Eldredge	1883–1887	Michigan	Democratic	1813–1893
Samuel Atkins Eliot	1850–1851	Massachusetts	Whig	1798–1862
Thomas D. Eliot	1854–1855	Massachusetts	Whig	1808–1870
Thomas D. Eliot	1859–1869	Massachusetts	Republican	1808–1870
Thomas H. Eliot	1941–1943	Massachusetts	Democratic	1907–1991
Joaquín Miguel Elizalde	1938–1944	Philippines	None	1896–1965
Stephen B. Elkins	1873–1877	New Mexico	Republican	1841–1911
Henry Ellenbogen	1933–1938	Pennsylvania	Democratic	1900–1985
J. Edwin Ellerbe	1905–1913	South Carolina	Democratic	1867–1917
Henry T. Ellett	1847	Mississippi	Democratic	1812–1887
Tazewell Ellett	1895–1897	Virginia	Democratic	1856–1914
Benjamin Ellicott	1817–1819	New York	Democratic-Republican	1765–1827
James Elliot	1803–1809	Vermont	Federalist	1775–1839
Alfred J. Elliott	1937–1949	California	Democratic	1895–1973
Carl Elliott	1949–1965	Alabama	Democratic	1913–1999
Douglas Hemphill Elliott	1960	Pennsylvania	Republican	1921–1960
James T. Elliott	1869	Arkansas	Republican	1823–1875
John Milton Elliott	1853–1859	Kentucky	Democratic	1820–1879
Mortimer Fitzland Elliott	1883–1885	Pennsylvania	Democratic	1839–1920
Richard N. Elliott	1917–1931	Indiana	Republican	1873–1948
Robert B. Elliott	1871–1874	South Carolina	Republican	1842–1884
William Elliott	1887–1890; 1891–1893; 1895–1896; 1897–1903	South Carolina	Democratic	1838–1907
Caleb Ellis	1805–1807	New Hampshire	Federalist	1767–1816
Chesselden Ellis	1843–1845	New York	Democratic	1808–1854
Clyde T. Ellis	1939–1943	Arkansas	Democratic	1908–1980
E. John Ellis	1875–1885	Louisiana	Democratic	1840–1889
Edgar C. Ellis	1905–1909; 1921–1923; 1925–1927; 1929–1931	Missouri	Republican	1854–1947
Hubert S. Ellis	1943–1949	West Virginia	Republican	1887–1959
William Cox Ellis	1823–1825	Pennsylvania	Federalist	1787–1871
William R. Ellis	1893–1899; 1907–1911	Oregon	Republican	1850–1915
William T. Ellis	1889–1895	Kentucky	Democratic	1845–1925
Andrew Ellison	1853–1855	Ohio	Democratic	1812–1860
Daniel Ellison	1943–1945	Maryland	Republican	1886–1960
Keith Ellison	2007–2019	Minnesota	Democratic	1963–present
Renee Ellmers	2011–2017	North Carolina	Republican	1964–present
William W. Ellsberry	1885–1887	Ohio	Democratic	1833–1894
Brad Ellsworth	2007–2011	Indiana	Democratic	1958–present
Charles C. Ellsworth	1877–1879	Michigan	Republican	1824–1899
Franklin Ellsworth	1915–1921	Minnesota	Republican	1879–1942
Harris Ellsworth	1943–1957	Oregon	Republican	1899–1986
Robert Ellsworth	1961–1967	Kansas	Republican	1926–2011
Samuel S. Ellsworth	1845–1847	New York	Democratic	1790–1863
William W. Ellsworth	1829–1834	Connecticut	National Republican	1791–1868
Reuben Ellwood	1883–1885	Illinois	Republican	1821–1885
Lawrence R. Ellzey	1932–1935	Mississippi	Democratic	1891–1977
Lucas Elmendorf	1797–1803	New York	Democratic-Republican	1758–1843
Ebenezer Elmer	1801–1807	New Jersey	Democratic-Republican	1752–1843
Lucius Elmer	1843–1845	New Jersey	Democratic	1793–1883
William P. Elmer	1943–1945	Missouri	Republican	1871–1956
Franklin H. Elmore	1836–1839	South Carolina	States Rights Democratic	1799–1850
Edward J. Elsaesser	1945–1949	New York	Republican	1904–1983
Charles H. Elston	1939–1953	Ohio	Republican	1891–1980
John A. Elston	1915–1921	California	Progressive	1874–1921
Ralph R. Eltse	1933–1935	California	Republican	1885–1971
Politte Elvins	1909–1911	Missouri	Republican	1878–1943
Alfred Ely	1859–1863	New York	Republican	1815–1892
Frederick D. Ely	1885–1887	Massachusetts	Republican	1838–1921
John Ely	1839–1841	New York	Democratic	1774–1849
Smith Ely Jr.	1871–1873; 1875–1876	New York	Democratic	1825–1911
William Ely	1805–1815	Massachusetts	Federalist	1765–1817
Rahm Emanuel	2003–2009	Illinois	Democratic	1959–present
Elisha Embree	1847–1849	Indiana	Whig	1801–1863
Martin Emerich	1903–1905	Illinois	Democratic	1846–1922
Bill Emerson	1981–1996	Missouri	Republican	1938–1996
Henry I. Emerson	1915–1921	Ohio	Republican	1871–1953
Jo Ann Emerson	1996–1997; 1997; 1997–2013	Missouri	Republican; Independent; Republican	1950–present
Louis W. Emerson	1899–1903	New York	Republican	1857–1924
David F. Emery	1975–1983	Maine	Republican	1948–present
James Emott	1809–1813	New York	Federalist	1771–1850
Jonas R. Emrie	1855–1857	Ohio	Oppositionist	1812–1869
Albert J. Engel	1935–1951	Michigan	Republican	1888–1959
Eliot Engel	1989–2021	New York	Democratic	1947–2026
Edward T. England	1927–1929	West Virginia	Republican	1869–1934
Clair Engle	1943–1959	California	Democratic	1911–1964
Harry L. Englebright	1926–1943	California	Republican	1884–1943
William F. Englebright	1906–1911	California	Republican	1855–1915
Glenn English	1975–1994	Oklahoma	Democratic	1940–present
James E. English	1861–1865	Connecticut	Democratic	1812–1890
Karan English	1993–1995	Arizona	Democratic	1949–present
Phil English	1995–2009	Pennsylvania	Republican	1956–present
Thomas Dunn English	1891–1895	New Jersey	Democratic	1819–1902
Warren B. English	1894–1895	California	Democratic	1840–1913
William E. English	1884–1885	Indiana	Democratic	1850–1926
William Hayden English	1853–1861	Indiana	Democratic	1822–1896
Benjamin A. Enloe	1887–1895	Tennessee	Democratic	1848–1922
William H. Enochs	1891–1893	Ohio	Republican	1842–1893
John Ensign	1995–1999	Nevada	Republican	1958–present
William Enyart	2013–2015	Illinois	Democratic	1949–present
James F. Epes	1891–1895	Virginia	Democratic	1842–1910
Sydney Parham Epes	1897–1898; 1899–1900	Virginia	Democratic	1865–1900
John Wayles Eppes	1803–1811; 1813–1815	Virginia	Democratic-Republican	1773–1823
Arlen Erdahl	1979–1983	Minnesota	Republican	1931–2023
Constantine J. Erdman	1893–1897	Pennsylvania	Democratic	1846–1911
Jacob Erdman	1845–1847	Pennsylvania	Democratic	1801–1867
Ben Erdreich	1983–1993	Alabama	Democratic	1938–present
Edmund F. Erk	1930–1933	Pennsylvania	Republican	1872–1953
John N. Erlenborn	1965–1985	Illinois	Republican	1927–2005
Daniel Ermentrout	1881–1889; 1897–1899	Pennsylvania	Democratic	1837–1899
Russell Errett	1877–1883	Pennsylvania	Republican	1817–1891
Allen E. Ertel	1977–1983	Pennsylvania	Democratic	1937–2015
James Ervin	1817–1821	South Carolina	Democratic-Republican	1778–1841
Joseph Wilson Ervin	1945	North Carolina	Democratic	1901–1945
Sam Ervin	1946–1947	North Carolina	Democratic	1896–1985
John J. Esch	1899–1921	Wisconsin	Republican	1861–1941
Marvin L. Esch	1967–1977	Michigan	Republican	1927–2010
Edwin D. Eshleman	1967–1977	Pennsylvania	Republican	1920–1985
Anna Eshoo	1993–2025	California	Democratic	1942–present
Edward E. Eslick	1925–1932	Tennessee	Democratic	1872–1932
Willa Blake Eslick	1932–1933	Tennessee	Democratic	1878–1961
Mike Espy	1987–1993	Mississippi	Democratic	1953–present
Frederick Essen	1918–1919	Missouri	Republican	1863–1946
Experience Estabrook	1859–1860	Nebraska	Democratic	1813–1894
Harry A. Estep	1927–1933	Pennsylvania	Republican	1884–1968
Charles J. Esterly	1925–1927; 1929–1931	Pennsylvania	Republican	1888–1940
Benjamin Estil	1825–1827	Virginia	National Republican	1780–1853
Albert Estopinal	1908–1919	Louisiana	Democratic	1845–1919
Constantine C. Esty	1872–1873	Massachusetts	Republican	1824–1912
Elizabeth Esty	2013–2019	Connecticut	Democratic	1959–present
Bob Etheridge	1997–2011	North Carolina	Democratic	1941–present
Emerson Etheridge	1853–1855	Tennessee	Whig	1819–1902
Emerson Etheridge	1855–1857	Tennessee	American	1819–1902
Emerson Etheridge	1859–1861	Tennessee	Oppositionist	1819–1902
George Eustis Jr.	1855–1859	Louisiana	American	1828–1872
William Eustis	1801–1805; 1820–1823	Massachusetts	Democratic-Republican	1753–1825
Alexander Evans	1847–1853	Maryland	Whig	1818–1888
Alvin Evans	1901–1905	Pennsylvania	Republican	1845–1906
Billy Lee Evans	1977–1983	Georgia	Democratic	1941–present
Charles R. Evans	1919–1921	Nevada	Democratic	1866–1954
David Ellicott Evans	1827	New York	Democratic	1788–1850
David R. Evans	1813–1815	South Carolina	Democratic-Republican	1769–1843
David W. Evans	1975–1983	Indiana	Democratic	1946–present
Frank Evans	1965–1979	Colorado	Democratic	1923–2010
George Evans	1829–1837	Maine	National Republican	1797–1867
George Evans	1837–1841	Maine	Whig	1797–1867
H. Clay Evans	1889–1891	Tennessee	Republican	1843–1921
Hiram K. Evans	1923–1925	Iowa	Republican	1863–1941
Isaac Newton Evans	1877–1879; 1883–1887	Pennsylvania	Republican	1827–1901
James L. Evans	1875–1879	Indiana	Republican	1825–1903
John M. Evans	1913–1921; 1923–1933	Montana	Democratic	1863–1946
Joshua Evans Jr.	1829–1833	Pennsylvania	Democratic	1777–1846
Lane Evans	1983–2007	Illinois	Democratic	1951–2014
Lemuel D. Evans	1855–1857	Texas	American	1810–1877
Lynden Evans	1911–1913	Illinois	Democratic	1858–1926
Marcellus H. Evans	1935–1941	New York	Democratic	1884–1953
Melvin H. Evans	1979–1981	U.S. Virgin Islands	Republican	1917–1984
Nathan Evans	1847–1851	Ohio	Whig	1804–1879
Robert E. Evans	1919–1923	Nebraska	Republican	1856–1925
T. Cooper Evans	1981–1987	Iowa	Republican	1924–2005
Thomas Evans	1797–1801	Virginia	Federalist	c. 1755–1815
Thomas B. Evans Jr.	1977–1983	Delaware	Republican	1931–present
Walter Evans	1895–1899	Kentucky	Republican	1842–1923
William E. Evans	1927–1935	California	Republican	1877–1959
Edward Everett	1825–1835	Massachusetts	National Republican	1794–1865
Fats Everett	1958–1969	Tennessee	Democratic	1915–1969
Horace Everett	1829–1837	Vermont	National Republican	1779–1851
Horace Everett	1837–1843	Vermont	Whig	1779–1851
Robert W. Everett	1891–1893	Georgia	Democratic	1839–1915
Terry Everett	1993–2009	Alabama	Republican	1937–2024
William Everett	1893–1895	Massachusetts	Democratic	1839–1910
James B. Everhart	1883–1887	Pennsylvania	Republican	1821–1888
William Everhart	1853–1855	Pennsylvania	Whig	1785–1868
Joe L. Evins	1947–1977	Tennessee	Democratic	1910–1984
John H. Evins	1877–1884	South Carolina	Democratic	1830–1884
Hamilton G. Ewart	1889–1891	North Carolina	Republican	1849–1918
Andrew Ewing	1849–1851	Tennessee	Democratic	1813–1864
Edwin Hickman Ewing	1846–1847	Tennessee	Whig	1809–1902
John Ewing	1833–1835	Indiana	National Republican	1789–1858
John Ewing	1837–1839	Indiana	Whig	1789–1858
John Hoge Ewing	1845–1847	Pennsylvania	Whig	1796–1887
Presley Ewing	1851–1854	Kentucky	Whig	1822–1854
Thomas Ewing Jr.	1877–1881	Ohio	Democratic	1829–1896
Tom Ewing	1991–2001	Illinois	Republican	1935–present
