= List of former United States representatives (N) =

This is a complete list of former United States representatives whose last names begin with the letter N.

== Number of years and terms the member has served ==
The number of years the representative/delegate has served in Congress indicates the number of terms the representative/delegate has. Note the representative/delegate can also serve non-consecutive terms if the representative/delegate loses election and wins re-election to the House.

- 2 years - 1 or 2 terms
- 4 years - 2 or 3 terms
- 6 years - 3 or 4 terms
- 8 years - 4 or 5 terms
- 10 years - 5 or 6 terms
- 12 years - 6 or 7 terms
- 14 years - 7 or 8 terms
- 16 years - 8 or 9 terms
- 18 years - 9 or 10 terms
- 20 years - 10 or 11 terms
- 22 years - 11 or 12 terms
- 24 years - 12 or 13 terms
- 26 years - 13 or 14 terms
- 28 years - 14 or 15 terms
- 30 years - 15 or 16 terms
- 32 years - 16 or 17 terms
- 34 years - 17 or 18 terms
- 36 years - 18 or 19 terms
- 38 years - 19 or 20 terms
- 40 years - 20 or 21 terms
- 42 years - 21 or 22 terms
- 44 years - 22 or 23 terms
- 46 years - 23 or 24 terms
- 48 years - 24 or 25 terms
- 50 years - 25 or 26 terms
- 52 years - 26 or 27 terms
- 54 years - 27 or 28 terms
- 56 years - 28 or 29 terms
- 58 years - 29 or 30 terms

Name	Term	State/ Territory	Party	Lifespan
Benjamin D. Nabers	1851–1853	Mississippi	Unionist	1812–1878
David R. Nagle	1987–1993	Iowa	Democratic	1943–present
Henry F. Naphen	1899–1903	Massachusetts	Democratic	1852–1905
John Light Napier	1981–1983	South Carolina	Republican	1947–present
Grace Napolitano	1999–2025	California	Democratic	1936–present
Harry E. Narey	1942–1943	Iowa	Republican	1885–1962
Charles E. Nash	1875–1877	Louisiana	Republican	1844–1913
William Natcher	1953–1994	Kentucky	Democratic	1909–1994
Charles Naylor	1837–1841	Pennsylvania	Whig	1806–1872
Henry S. Neal	1877–1883	Ohio	Republican	1828–1906
John R. Neal	1885–1889	Tennessee	Democratic	1836–1889
Lawrence T. Neal	1873–1877	Ohio	Democratic	1844–1905
Stephen L. Neal	1975–1995	North Carolina	Democratic	1934–present
Will E. Neal	1953–1955; 1957–1959	West Virginia	Republican	1875–1959
Raphael Neale	1819–1825	Maryland	Federalist	17?? –1833
Lucien Nedzi	1961–1981	Michigan	Democratic	1925–2025
William H. Neece	1883–1887	Illinois	Democratic	1831–1909
James C. Needham	1899–1913	California	Republican	1864–1942
George A. Neeley	1912–1915	Kansas	Democratic	1879–1919
Matthew M. Neely	1913–1921; 1945–1947	West Virginia	Democratic	1874–1958
James S. Negley	1869–1875; 1885–1887	Pennsylvania	Republican	1826–1901
Gloria Negrete McLeod	2013–2015	California	Democratic	1941–present
Robert Neill	1893–1897	Arkansas	Democratic	1838–1907
James Nelligan	1981–1983	Pennsylvania	Republican	1929–2026
Ancher Nelsen	1959–1974	Minnesota	Republican	1904–1992
Adolphus Peter Nelson	1918–1923	Wisconsin	Republican	1872–1927
Bill Nelson	1979–1991	Florida	Democratic	1942–present
Charles P. Nelson	1949–1957	Maine	Republican	1907–1962
Homer Augustus Nelson	1863–1865	New York	Democratic	1829–1891
Hugh Nelson	1811–1823	Virginia	Democratic-Republican	1768–1836
Jeremiah Nelson	1805–1807; 1815–1825	Massachusetts	Federalist	1769–1838
Jeremiah Nelson	1831–1833	Massachusetts	National Republican	1769–1838
John Nelson	1821–1823	Maryland	Democratic-Republican	1791–1860
John E. Nelson	1922–1933	Maine	Republican	1874–1955
John M. Nelson	1906–1919; 1921–1933	Wisconsin	Republican	1870–1955
Knute Nelson	1883–1889	Minnesota	Republican	1843–1923
Roger Nelson	1804–1810	Maryland	Democratic-Republican	1759–1815
Thomas A. R. Nelson	1859–1861	Tennessee	Oppositionist	1812–1873
Thomas M. Nelson	1816–1819	Virginia	Democratic-Republican	1782–1853
William Nelson	1847–1851	New York	Whig	1784–1869
William L. Nelson	1919–1921; 1925–1933; 1935–1943	Missouri	Democratic	1875–1946
Henry Nes	1843–1845	Pennsylvania	Independent Democrat	1799–1850
Henry Nes	1847–1850	Pennsylvania	Whig	1799–1850
Walter Nesbit	1933–1935	Illinois	Democratic	1878–1938
Wilson Nesbitt	1817–1819	South Carolina	Democratic-Republican	1781–1861
James Nesmith	1873–1875	Oregon	Democratic	1820–1885
George Nethercutt	1995–2005	Washington	Republican	1944–2024
Randy Neugebauer	2003–2017	Texas	Republican	1949–present
Mark Neumann	1995–1999	Wisconsin	Republican	1954–present
Joseph Neville	1793–1795	Virginia	Anti-Administration	1733–1819
William Neville	1899–1903	Nebraska	Populist	1843–1909
Robert M. Nevin	1901–1907	Ohio	Republican	1850–1912
Anthony New	1793–1795	Virginia	Anti-Administration	1747–1833
Anthony New	1795–1805	Virginia	Democratic-Republican	1747–1833
Anthony New	1811–1813; 1817–1819; 1821–1823	Kentucky	Democratic-Republican	1747–1833
Jeptha D. New	1875–1877; 1879–1881	Indiana	Democratic	1830–1892
John Stoughton Newberry	1879–1881	Michigan	Republican	1826–1887
Walter C. Newberry	1891–1893	Illinois	Democratic	1835–1912
Thomas Newbold	1807–1813	New Jersey	Democratic-Republican	1760–1823
Carman Newcomb	1867–1869	Missouri	Republican	1830–1902
William A. Newell	1847–1851	New Jersey	Whig	1817–1901
William A. Newell	1865–1867	New Jersey	Republican	1817–1901
J. Lincoln Newhall	1929–1931	Kentucky	Republican	1870–1952
Peter Newhard	1839–1843	Pennsylvania	Democratic	1783–1860
Francis G. Newlands	1893–1903	Nevada	Democratic	1846–1917
Alexander Newman	1849	Virginia	Democratic	1804–1849
Marie Newman	2021–2023	Illinois	Democratic	1964–present
Daniel Newnan	1831–1833	Georgia	Democratic	1780–1851
Joseph P. Newsham	1868–1869; 1870–1871	Louisiana	Republican	1837–1919
John P. Newsome	1943–1945	Alabama	Democratic	1893–1961
Cherubusco Newton	1887–1889	Louisiana	Democratic	1848–1910
Cleveland A. Newton	1919–1927	Missouri	Republican	1873–1945
Eben Newton	1851–1853	Ohio	Whig	1795–1885
Thomas Newton Jr.	1801–1825	Virginia	Democratic-Republican	1768–1847
Thomas Newton Jr.	1825–1830; 1831–1833	Virginia	National Republican	1768–1847
Thomas Willoughby Newton	1847	Arkansas	Whig	1804–1853
Walter Newton	1919–1929	Minnesota	Republican	1880–1941
Willoughby Newton	1843–1845	Virginia	Whig	1802–1874
Bob Ney	1995–2006	Ohio	Republican	1954–present
Silas L. Niblack	1873	Florida	Democratic	1825–1883
William E. Niblack	1857–1861; 1865–1875	Indiana	Democratic	1822–1893
John Nicholas	1793–1795	Virginia	Anti-Administration	1764–1819
John Nicholas	1795–1801	Virginia	Democratic-Republican	1764–1819
Wilson Cary Nicholas	1807–1809	Virginia	Democratic-Republican	1761–1820
John C. Nicholls	1879–1881; 1883–1885	Georgia	Democratic	1834–1893
Samuel J. Nicholls	1915–1921	South Carolina	Democratic	1885–1937
Thomas D. Nicholls	1907–1911	Pennsylvania	Independent Democrat	1870–1931
Charles Archibald Nichols	1915–1920	Michigan	Republican	1876–1920
Dick Nichols	1991–1993	Kansas	Republican	1926–2019
John Nichols	1887–1889	North Carolina	Independent	1834–1917
John C. Nichols	1935–1943	Oklahoma	Democratic	1896–1945
Matthias H. Nichols	1853–1855	Ohio	Democratic	1824–1862
Matthias H. Nichols	1855–1857	Ohio	Oppositionist	1824–1862
Matthias H. Nichols	1857–1859	Ohio	Republican	1824–1862
Bill Nichols	1967–1988	Alabama	Democratic	1918–1988
Donald W. Nicholson	1947–1959	Massachusetts	Republican	1888–1968
John Nicholson	1809–1811	New York	Democratic-Republican	1765–1820
John A. Nicholson	1865–1869	Delaware	Democratic	1827–1906
Joseph Hopper Nicholson	1799–1806	Maryland	Democratic-Republican	1770–1817
Wiley Nickel	2023–2025	North Carolina	Democratic	1975–present
Henry Nicoll	1847–1849	New York	Democratic	1812–1879
Frederick G. Niedringhaus	1889–1891	Missouri	Republican	1837–1922
Henry F. Niedringhaus	1927–1933	Missouri	Republican	1864–1941
Howard C. Nielson	1983–1991	Utah	Republican	1924–2020
Jason Niles	1873–1875	Mississippi	Republican	1814–1894
Nathaniel Niles	1791–1795	Vermont	Anti-Administration	1741–1828
F. Jay Nimtz	1957–1959	Indiana	Republican	1915–1990
E. A. Nisbet	1839–1841	Georgia	Whig	1803–1871
Archibald C. Niven	1845–1847	New York	Democratic	1803–1882
Robert N. C. Nix Sr.	1958–1979	Pennsylvania	Democratic	1898–1987
John T. Nixon	1859–1863	New Jersey	Republican	1820–1889
Richard Nixon	1947–1950	California	Republican	1913–1994
David A. Noble	1853–1855	Michigan	Democratic	1802–1876
Warren P. Noble	1861–1865	Ohio	Democratic	1820–1903
William H. Noble	1837–1839	New York	Democratic	1788–1850
Robert Nodar Jr.	1947–1949	New York	Republican	1916–1974
John W. Noell	1859–1863	Missouri	Democratic	1816–1863
John W. Noell	1863	Missouri	Unconditional Unionist	1816–1863
Thomas E. Noell	1865–1867	Missouri	Republican	1839–1867
Thomas E. Noell	1867	Missouri	Democratic	1839–1867
Kristi Noem	2011–2019	South Dakota	Republican	1971–present
John I. Nolan	1913–1922	California	Republican	1874–1922
Mae Nolan	1923–1925	California	Republican	1886–1973
Michael N. Nolan	1881–1883	New York	Democratic	1833–1905
Rick Nolan	1975–1981; 2013–2019	Minnesota	Democratic	1943–2024
William I. Nolan	1929–1933	Minnesota	Republican	1874–1943
James Ellsworth Noland	1949–1951	Indiana	Democratic	1920–1992
Edward Thomas Noonan	1899–1901	Illinois	Democratic	1861–1923
George H. Noonan	1895–1897	Texas	Republican	1828–1907
A. Walter Norblad	1946–1964	Oregon	Republican	1908–1964
Amasa Norcross	1877–1883	Massachusetts	Republican	1824–1898
Fred B. Norman	1943–1945; 1947	Washington	Republican	1882–1947
Catherine Dorris Norrell	1961–1963	Arkansas	Democratic	1901–1981
William F. Norrell	1939–1961	Arkansas	Democratic	1896–1961
Benjamin White Norris	1868–1869	Alabama	Republican	1819–1873
George W. Norris	1903–1913	Nebraska	Republican	1861–1944
Moses Norris Jr.	1843–1847	New Hampshire	Democratic	1799–1855
S. Taylor North	1915–1917	Pennsylvania	Republican	1853–1917
Anne Northup	1997–2007	Kentucky	Republican	1948–present
Stephen A. Northway	1893–1898	Ohio	Republican	1833–1898
Ebenezer F. Norton	1829–1831	New York	Democratic	1774–1851
Elijah Hise Norton	1861–1863	Missouri	Democratic	1821–1914
James Norton	1897–1901	South Carolina	Democratic	1843–1920
James A. Norton	1897–1903	Ohio	Democratic	1843–1912
Jesse O. Norton	1853–1855	Illinois	Whig	1812–1875
Jesse O. Norton	1855–1857	Illinois	Oppositionist	1812–1875
Jesse O. Norton	1863–1865	Illinois	Republican	1812–1875
John N. Norton	1927–1929; 1931–1933	Nebraska	Democratic	1878–1960
Mary Teresa Norton	1925–1951	New Jersey	Democratic	1875–1959
Miner G. Norton	1921–1923	Ohio	Republican	1857–1926
Nelson I. Norton	1875–1877	New York	Republican	1820–1887
Patrick Norton	1913–1919	North Dakota	Republican	1876–1953
Richard H. Norton	1889–1893	Missouri	Democratic	1849–1918
Charlie Norwood	1995–2007	Georgia	Republican	1941–2007
Thomas M. Norwood	1885–1889	Georgia	Democratic	1830–1913
Abraham Nott	1799–1801	South Carolina	Federalist	1768–1830
Henry J. Nowak	1975–1993	New York	Democratic	1935–2024
John Noyes	1815–1817	Vermont	Federalist	1764–1841
Joseph C. Noyes	1837–1839	Maine	Whig	1798–1868
Stephen Friel Nuckolls	1869–1871	Wyoming	Democratic	1825-1879
William T. Nuckolls	1827–1833	South Carolina	Democratic	1801–1855
Robert H. Nugen	1861–1863	Ohio	Democratic	1809–1872
Rich Nugent	2011–2017	Florida	Republican	1951–present
Devin Nunes	2003–2022	California	Republican	1973–present
David A. Nunn	1867–1869; 1873–1875	Tennessee	Republican	1833–1918
Alan Nunnelee	2011–2015	Mississippi	Republican	1958–2015
Jim Nussle	1991–2007	Iowa	Republican	1960–present
Alonzo Nute	1889–1891	New Hampshire	Republican	1826–1892
Newton W. Nutting	1883–1885; 1887–1889	New York	Republican	1840–1889
Frank Nye	1907–1913	Minnesota	Republican	1852–1935
Glenn Nye	2009–2011	Virginia	Democratic	1974–present
Hjalmar Nygaard	1961–1963	North Dakota	Republican	1906–1963
