= Earle House =

Earle House may refer to:

- Earle House (Canehill, Arkansas), listed on the National Register of Historic Places in Washington County, Arkansas
- Earle House (Sarasota, Florida), listed on the NRHP in Sarasota County, Florida
- John M. Earle House, Fall River, Massachusetts, listed on the NRHP in Massachusetts
- Col. Elias Earle Historic District, Greenville, South Carolina, listed on the NRHP in Greenville, South Carolina
- Earle Town House, Greenville, South Carolina, listed on the NRHP in Greenville, South Carolina
- Williams-Earle House, Greenville, South Carolina, listed on the NRHP in Greenville, South Carolina
- Earle-Napier-Kinnard House, Waco, Texas, listed on the NRHP in McLennan County, Texas

== See also ==
- Earl House (disambiguation)
