= List of United States representatives from South Carolina =

The following is an alphabetical list of United States representatives from the state of South Carolina. For chronological tables of members of both houses of the United States Congress from the state (through the present day), see South Carolina's congressional delegations.

== Current representatives ==
As of January 3, 2025

- 1st district: Nancy Mace (R) (since 2021)
- 2nd district: Joe Wilson (R) (since 2001)
- 3rd district: Sheri Biggs (R) (since 2025)
- 4th district: William Timmons (R) (since 2019)
- 5th district: Ralph Norman (R) (since 2017)
- 6th district: Jim Clyburn (D) (since 1993)
- 7th district: Russell Fry (R) (since 2023)

== List of members ==
Member	Party	District	Years	Electoral history
D. Wyatt Aiken	Democratic	3rd	March 4, 1877 – March 3, 1887	Elected in 1876. Retired.
William Aiken, Jr.	Democratic	6th	March 4, 1851 – March 3, 1853	Elected in 1850. Redistricted to the 2nd district.
William Aiken, Jr.	Democratic	2nd	March 4, 1853 – March 3, 1857	Redistricted from the 6th district and re-elected in 1853. Retired.
Wyatt Aiken	Democratic	3rd	March 4, 1903 – March 3, 1917	Elected in 1902. Lost renomination to Dominick.
Lemuel J. Alston	Democratic-Republican	8th	March 4, 1807 – March 3, 1811	Elected in 1806. Retired.
John D. Ashmore	Democratic	5th	March 4, 1859 – December 21, 1860	Elected in 1858. Re-elected in 1860 but resigned due to Civil War.
Robert T. Ashmore	Democratic	4th	June 2, 1953 – January 3, 1969	Elected to finish Bryson's term. Retired.
Robert Barnwell	Pro-Administration	2nd	March 4, 1791 – March 3, 1793	Elected in 1790. Retired.
Robert Woodward Barnwell	Jacksonian	2nd	March 4, 1829 – March 3, 1831	Elected in 1828. Switched parties.
Robert Woodward Barnwell	Nullifier	2nd	March 4, 1831 – March 3, 1833	Re-elected in 1830 as a Nullifier. Retired.
Gresham Barrett	Republican	3rd	January 3, 2003 – January 3, 2011	Elected in 2002. Retired.
Joseph Bellinger	Democratic-Republican	4th	March 4, 1817 – March 3, 1819	Elected in 1816. Retired.
Lemuel Benton	Anti-Administration	3rd	March 4, 1793 – March 3, 1795	Elected in 1793. Switched parties.
Lemuel Benton	Democratic-Republican	3rd	March 4, 1795 – March 3, 1799	Re-elected in 1794 as a Democratic-Republican. Lost re-election to B. Huger.
Sheri Biggs	Republican	3rd	January 3, 2025 – present	Elected in 2024.
James A. Black	Democratic	1st	March 4, 1843 – April 3, 1848	Elected in 1843. Died.
James Blair	Democratic-Republican	9th	March 4, 1821 – May 8, 1822	Elected to finish member-elect John S. Richards' term
James Blair	Jacksonian	8th	March 4, 1829 – April 1, 1834	Elected in 1828. Died.
Milledge Luke Bonham	Democratic	4th	March 4, 1857 – December 21, 1860	Elected to finish Brooks' term. Re-elected in 1860 but retired due to Civil War.
Christopher C. Bowen	Republican	2nd	July 20, 1868 – March 3, 1871	Elected to finish the short term. Lost re-election to De Large.
William Waters Boyce	Democratic	6th	March 4, 1853 – December 21, 1860	Elected in 1853. Re-elected in 1860 but retired due to Civil War.
John Bratton	Democratic	4th	December 8, 1884 – March 3, 1885	Elected to finish Evins's term. Retired.
William H. Brawley	Democratic	1st	March 4, 1891 – February 12, 1894	Elected in 1890. Resigned to become US District Court judge.
Joseph Brevard	Democratic-Republican	9th	March 4, 1819 – March 3, 1821	Elected in 1818. Retired.
Preston Brooks	Democratic	4th	March 4, 1853 – July 15, 1856	Elected in 1853. Resigned to gain constituents' support for Caning of Charles Sumner.
Preston Brooks	Democratic	4th	August 1, 1856 – January 28, 1857	Re-elected to finish his own term. Died.
Henry Brown	Republican	1st	January 3, 2001 – January 3, 2011	Elected in 2000. Retired.
Joseph R. Bryson	Democratic	4th	January 3, 1939 – March 10, 1953	Elected in 1938. Died.
Aedanus Burke	Anti-Administration	2nd	March 4, 1789 – March 3, 1791	Elected in 1788. Retired.
Armistead Burt	Democratic	5th	March 4, 1843 – March 3, 1853	Elected in 1843. Retired.
Sampson H. Butler	Democratic	4th	March 4, 1839 – September 27, 1842	Elected in 1838. Resigned.
William Butler	Democratic-Republican	5th	March 4, 1801 – March 3, 1803	Elected in 1800. Redistricted to the 2nd district.
William Butler	Democratic-Republican	2nd	March 4, 1803 – March 3, 1813	Redistricted from the 5th district and re-elected in 1803. Retired.
William Butler	Whig	6th	March 4, 1841 – March 3, 1843	Elected in 1840. Redistricted to the 2nd district and lost re-election to Simpson.
Charles W. Buttz	Republican	2nd	November 7, 1876 – March 3, 1877	Elected to finish Mackey's term. Retired.
James F. Byrnes	Democratic	2nd	March 4, 1911 – March 3, 1925	Elected in 1910. Retired to run for U.S. senator.
Richard H. Cain	Republican	At-large	March 4, 1873 – March 3, 1875	Elected in 1872. Retired.
Richard H. Cain	Republican	2nd	March 4, 1877 – March 3, 1879	Elected in 1876. Retired.
Patrick C. Caldwell	Democratic	9th	March 4, 1841 – March 3, 1843	Elected in 1840. Redistricted to the 5th district and lost re-election to Burt.
John C. Calhoun	Democratic-Republican	6th	March 4, 1811 – November 3, 1817	Elected in 1810. Resigned to become U.S. Secretary of War.
Joseph Calhoun	Democratic-Republican	6th	June 2, 1807 – March 3, 1811	Elected to finish Casey's term. Retired.
Carroll A. Campbell, Jr.	Republican	4th	January 3, 1979 – January 3, 1987	Elected in 1978. Retired to run for Governor.
John Campbell	Jacksonian	3rd	March 4, 1829 – March 3, 1831	Elected in 1828. Lost re-election to Mitchell.
John Campbell	Nullifier	3rd	March 4, 1837 – March 3, 1839	Elected in 1836. Switched parties.
John Campbell	Democratic	3rd	March 4, 1839 – March 3, 1843	Re-elected in 1838 as a Democrat. Redistricted to the 4th district.
John Campbell	Democratic	4th	March 4, 1843 – March 3, 1845	Redistricted from the 3rd district and re-elected in 1843. Retired.
Robert B. Campbell	Democratic-Republican	3rd	March 4, 1823 – March 3, 1825	Elected in 1823. Retired.
Robert B. Campbell	Nullifier	3rd	February 24, 1834 – March 3, 1837	Elected to finish Singleton's term. Retired.
Lewis C. Carpenter	Republican	3rd	November 3, 1874 – March 3, 1875	Elected to finish Elliott's term. Retired.
John Carter	Democratic-Republican	9th	December 11, 1822 – March 3, 1823	Elected to finish Blair's term. Redistricted to the 8th district.
John Carter	Democratic-Republican	8th	March 4, 1823 – March 3, 1825	Redistricted from the 9th district and re-elected in 1823. Retired.
John Carter	Jacksonian	8th	March 4, 1825 – March 3, 1829	[data missing]
Levi Casey	Democratic-Republican	6th	March 4, 1803 – February 3, 1807	Elected in 1803. Died.
John J. Chappell	Democratic-Republican	4th	March 4, 1813 – March 3, 1817	Elected in 1812. Lost re-election to Bellinger.
Langdon Cheves	Democratic-Republican	1st	December 31, 1810 – March 3, 1815	Elected to finish Marion's term. Retired.
William K. Clowney	Nullifier	7th	March 4, 1833 – March 3, 1835	Elected in 1833. Lost re-election to Rogers.
William K. Clowney	Nullifier	7th	March 4, 1837 – March 3, 1839	Elected in 1836. Retired.
Jim Clyburn	Democratic	6th	January 3, 1993 – present	Elected in 1992.
William F. Colcock	Democratic	7th	March 4, 1849 – March 3, 1853	Elected in 1848. Retired.
Manuel S. Corley	Republican	3rd	July 25, 1868 – March 3, 1869	Elected to finish the short term. Retired.
James S. Cothran	Democratic	3rd	March 4, 1887 – March 3, 1891	Elected in 1886. Retired.
George W. Croft	Democratic	2nd	March 4, 1903 – March 10, 1904	Elected in 1902. Died.
Theodore G. Croft	Democratic	2nd	May 17, 1904 – March 3, 1905	Elected to finish his father's term. Retired.
Joe Cunningham	Democratic	1st	January 3, 2019 – January 3, 2021	Elected in 2018. Lost re-election to Mace.
George W. Dargan	Democratic	6th	March 4, 1883 – March 3, 1891	Elected in 1882. Retired.
Mendel J. Davis	Democratic	1st	April 27, 1971 – January 3, 1981	Elected to finish Rivers's term. Retired.
Warren R. Davis	Jacksonian	6th	March 4, 1827 – March 3, 1831	Elected in 1826. Switched parties.
Warren R. Davis	Nullifier	6th	March 4, 1831 – January 29, 1835	Re-elected in 1830 as a Nullifier. Re-elected in 1834 but died before next term began.
Robert C. De Large	Republican	2nd	March 4, 1871 – January 24, 1873	Elected in 1870. Seat declared vacant.
Jim DeMint	Republican	4th	January 3, 1999 – January 3, 2005	Elected in 1998. Retired to run for U.S. senator.
Butler Derrick	Democratic	3rd	January 3, 1975 – January 3, 1995	Elected in 1974. Retired.
Samuel Dibble	Democratic	2nd	June 9, 1881 – May 31, 1882	Elected to finish O'Connor's term. Lost the election contest to Mackey.
Samuel Dibble	Democratic	1st	March 4, 1883 – March 3, 1891	Elected in 1882. Retired.
Frederick H. Dominick	Democratic	3rd	March 4, 1917 – March 3, 1933	Elected in 1916. Lost renomination to J. C. Taylor.
William Jennings Bryan Dorn	Democratic	3rd	January 3, 1947 – January 3, 1949	Elected in 1946. Retired to run for U.S. senator.
William Jennings Bryan Dorn	Democratic	3rd	January 3, 1951 – December 31, 1974	Elected in 1950. Retired to run for Governor and resigned following defeat.
William Drayton	Jacksonian	1st	May 17, 1825 – March 3, 1833	Elected to finish Poinsett's term. Retired.
Jeff Duncan	Republican	3rd	January 3, 2011 – January 3, 2025	Elected in 2010. Retired.
Elias Earle	Democratic-Republican	8th	March 4, 1805 – March 3, 1807	Elected to finish his nephew's term. Lost re-election to Alston.
Elias Earle	Democratic-Republican	8th	March 4, 1811 – March 3, 1813	[data missing]
Elias Earle	Democratic-Republican	7th	March 4, 1813 – March 3, 1815	Redistricted from the 8th district and re-elected in 1812. Lost re-election to J. Taylor.
Elias Earle	Democratic-Republican	7th	March 4, 1817 – March 3, 1821	Elected in 1816. Retired.
John B. Earle	Democratic-Republican	8th	March 4, 1803 – March 3, 1805	Elected in 1803. Re-elected in 1804 but declined the seat.
Samuel Earle	Democratic-Republican	6th	March 4, 1795 – March 3, 1797	Elected in 1794. Retired.
J. Edwin Ellerbe	Democratic	6th	March 4, 1905 – March 3, 1913	Elected in 1904. Lost renomination to Ragsdale.
Robert B. Elliott	Republican	3rd	March 4, 1871 – November 1, 1874	Elected in 1870. Resigned to become sheriff.
William Elliott	Democratic	7th	March 4, 1887 – September 23, 1890	Elected in 1886. Lost election contest to T. Miller.
William Elliott	Democratic	7th	March 4, 1891 – March 3, 1893	Elected in 1890. Retired.
William Elliott	Democratic	1st	March 4, 1895 – June 4, 1896	Elected in 1894. Lost election contest to Murray.
William Elliott	Democratic	1st	March 4, 1897 – March 3, 1903	Elected in 1896. Retired to run for U.S. senator.
Franklin H. Elmore	States Rights Democratic	4th	December 10, 1836 – March 3, 1839	Elected to finish Hammond's term. Retired.
James Ervin	Democratic-Republican	3rd	March 4, 1817 – March 3, 1821	Elected in 1816. Retired.
David R. Evans	Democratic-Republican	5th	March 4, 1813 – March 3, 1815	Elected in 1812. Retired.
John H. Evins	Democratic	4th	March 4, 1877 – October 20, 1884	Elected in 1876. Died.
Samuel Farrow	Democratic-Republican	8th	March 4, 1813 – March 3, 1815	Elected in 1812. Retired.
John Myers Felder	Jacksonian	4th	March 4, 1831 – March 3, 1833	Elected in 1830. Swtiched partied.
John Myers Felder	Nullifier	4th	March 4, 1833 – March 3, 1835	Re-elected in 1833 as a Nullifier. Retired.
David E. Finley	Democratic	5th	March 4, 1899 – January 26, 1917	Elected in 1898. Re-elected in 1916 but died before next term began.
Russell Fry	Republican	7th	January 3, 2023 – present	Elected in 2022.
Hampton P. Fulmer	Democratic	7th	March 4, 1921 – March 3, 1933	Elected in 1920. Redistricted to the 2nd district.
Hampton P. Fulmer	Democratic	2nd	March 4, 1933 – October 19, 1944	Redistricted from the 7th district and re-elected in 1932. Died.
Willa L. Fulmer	Democratic	2nd	November 7, 1944 – January 3, 1945	Elected to finish her husband's term. Retired.
Allard H. Gasque	Democratic	6th	March 4, 1923 – June 17, 1938	Elected in 1922. Died.
Elizabeth Hawley Gasque	Democratic	6th	September 13, 1938 – January 3, 1939	Elected to finish her husband's term. Retired.
Thomas S. Gettys	Democratic	5th	November 3, 1964 – December 31, 1974	Elected to finish Hemphill's term. Retired and resigned before next term began.
Alexander Gillon	Anti-Administration	5th	March 4, 1793 – October 6, 1794	Elected in 1793. Died.
Joseph Gist	Democratic-Republican	8th	March 4, 1821 – March 3, 1823	Elected in 1820. Redistricted to the 7th district.
Joseph Gist	Democratic-Republican	7th	March 4, 1823 – March 3, 1825	Redistricted from the 8th district and re-elected in 1823. Retired.
Joseph Gist	Jacksonian	7th	March 4, 1825 – March 3, 1827	[data missing]
James H. Goss	Republican	4th	July 18, 1868 – March 3, 1869	Elected in 1868. Retired.
Theodore Gourdin	Democratic-Republican	3rd	March 4, 1813 – March 3, 1815	Elected in 1812. Lost re-election to B. Huger.
Andrew R. Govan	Democratic-Republican	4th	December 4, 1822 – March 3, 1825	Elected to finish Overstreet's term. Switched parties.
Andrew R. Govan	Jacksonian	4th	March 4, 1825 – March 3, 1827	Re-elected in 1824 as a Jacksonian. Lost re-election to Martin.
Trey Gowdy	Republican	4th	January 3, 2011 – January 3, 2019	Elected in 2010. Retired.
Lindsey Graham	Republican	3rd	January 3, 1995 – January 3, 2003	Elected in 1994. Retired to run for U.S. senator.
William J. Grayson	Nullifier	2nd	March 4, 1833 – March 3, 1837	Elected in 1833. Lost re-election to Rhett.
John K. Griffin	Nullifier	9th	March 4, 1831 – March 3, 1837	Elected in 1830. Switched parties.
John K. Griffin	Democratic	9th	March 4, 1837 – March 3, 1841	Re-elected in 1838 as a Democrat. Retired.
James Hamilton, Jr.	Democratic-Republican	2nd	December 13, 1822 – March 3, 1825	Elected to finish W. Lowndes's term. Switched parties.
James Hamilton, Jr.	Jacksonian	2nd	March 4, 1825 – March 3, 1829	Re-elected in 1824 as a Jacksonian. Retired.
James Henry Hammond	Nullifier	4th	March 4, 1835 – February 26, 1836	Elected in 1834. Resigned.
Wade Hampton I	Democratic-Republican	2nd	March 4, 1795 – March 3, 1797	Elected to finish the term of member-elect Barnwell, who declined to serve. Retired.
Wade Hampton I	Democratic-Republican	4th	March 4, 1803 – March 3, 1805	Elected in 1803. Retired.
Butler B. Hare	Democratic	2nd	March 4, 1925 – March 3, 1933	Elected in 1924. Retired.
Butler B. Hare	Democratic	3rd	March 4, 1939 – March 3, 1947	Elected in 1938. Retired.
James B. Hare	Democratic	3rd	January 3, 1949 – January 3, 1951	Elected in 1948. Lost renomination to Dorn.
Robert Goodloe Harper	Pro-Administration	5th	February 9, 1795 – March 3, 1795	Elected to finish Gillon's term. Switched parties.
Robert Goodloe Harper	Federalist	5th	March 4, 1795 – March 3, 1801	Re-elected in 1794 as a Federalist. Retired.
Thomas F. Hartnett	Republican	1st	January 3, 1981 – January 3, 1987	Elected in 1980. Retired to run for Lieutenant Governor.
John J. Hemphill	Democratic	5th	March 4, 1883 – March 3, 1893	Elected in 1882. Lost renomination to Strait.
Robert W. Hemphill	Democratic	5th	January 3, 1957 – May 1, 1964	Elected in 1956. Resigned to become U.S. District Judge.
Solomon L. Hoge	Republican	3rd	April 8, 1869 – March 3, 1871	Elected in 1868. (Note: Successfully contested election of J.P. Reed); Retired.
Solomon L. Hoge	Republican	3rd	March 4, 1875 – March 3, 1877	Elected in 1874. Retired.
Kenneth Lamar Holland	Democratic	5th	January 3, 1975 – January 3, 1983	Elected in 1974. Retired.
Isaac E. Holmes	Democratic	1st	March 4, 1839 – March 3, 1843	Elected in 1838. Redistricted to the 6th district.
Isaac E. Holmes	Democratic	6th	March 4, 1843 – March 3, 1851	Redistricted from the 1st district and re-elected in 1843. Lost re-election to W. Aiken.
Benjamin Huger	Federalist	3rd	March 4, 1799 – March 3, 1805	Elected in 1798. Retired.
Benjamin Huger	Federalist	3rd	March 4, 1815 – March 3, 1817	Elected in 1814. Lost re-election to Ervin.
Daniel Huger	Pro-Administration	3rd	March 4, 1789 – March 3, 1793	Elected in 1788. Retired.
John Hunter	Anti-Administration	2nd	March 4, 1793 – March 3, 1795	Elected in 1793. Redistricted to the 5th district and lost re-election to Harper.
Bob Inglis	Republican	4th	January 3, 1993 – January 3, 1999	Elected in 1992. Retired to run for U.S. senator.
Bob Inglis	Republican	4th	January 3, 2005 – January 3, 2011	Elected in 2004. Lost renomination to Gowdy.
James F. Izlar	Democratic	1st	April 12, 1894 – March 3, 1895	Elected to finish Brawley's term. Retired.
John Jenrette	Democratic	6th	January 3, 1975 – December 10, 1980	Elected in 1974. Lost re-election to Napier and resigned early as a result of the ABSCAM scandal.
Joseph T. Johnson	Democratic	4th	March 4, 1901 – April 19, 1915	Elected in 1900. Resigned to accept a federal judgeship.
George Johnstone	Democratic	3rd	March 4, 1891 – March 3, 1893	Elected in 1890. Lost renomination to Latimer.
Laurence M. Keitt	Democratic	3rd	March 4, 1853 – July 15, 1856	Elected in 1853. Resigned to gain constituents' support following Caning of Charles Sumner.
Laurence M. Keitt	Democratic	3rd	August 6, 1856 – December ??, 1860	Elected to finish his own term. Retired early due to Civil War.
John Kershaw	Democratic-Republican	9th	March 4, 1813 – March 3, 1815	Elected in 1812. Lost re-election to Mayrant.
Asbury Latimer	Democratic	3rd	March 4, 1893 – March 3, 1903	Elected in 1892. Retired.
George S. Legaré	Democratic	1st	March 4, 1903 – January 31, 1913	Elected in 1902. Died.
Hugh S. Legaré	Democratic	1st	March 4, 1837 – March 3, 1839	Elected in 1836. Lost re-election to Holmes.
Asbury F. Lever	Democratic	7th	November 5, 1901 – August 1, 1919	Elected to finish Stokes's term. Resigned to become member of Federal Farm Loan Board.
W. Turner Logan	Democratic	1st	March 4, 1921 – March 3, 1925	Elected in 1920. Lost renomination to T. McMillan.
Thomas Lowndes	Federalist	1st	March 4, 1801 – March 3, 1805	Elected in 1800. Retired.
William Lowndes	Democratic-Republican	4th	March 4, 1811 – March 3, 1813	Elected in 1810. Redistricted to the 2nd district.
William Lowndes	Democratic-Republican	2nd	March 4, 1813 – May 8, 1822	Redistricted from the 4th district and re-elected in 1812. Resigned.
Nancy Mace	Republican	1st	January 3, 2021 – present	Elected in 2020.
Edmund W. M. Mackey	Independent Republican	2nd	March 4, 1875 – July 19, 1876	Elected in 1874. Seat declared vacant.
Edmund W. M. Mackey	Republican	2nd	May 31, 1882 – March 3, 1883	Won election contest. Redistricted to the 7th district.
Edmund W. M. Mackey	Republican	7th	March 4, 1883 – March 3, 1884	Redistricted from the 2nd district and re-elected in 1882. Died.
Gabriel H. Mahon, Jr.	Democratic	4th	November 3, 1936 – January 3, 1939	Elected to finish McSwain's term. Lost renomination to Bryson.
Edward C. Mann	Democratic	7th	October 7, 1919 – March 3, 1921	Elected to finish Lever's term. Lost renomination to Fulmer.
James R. Mann	Democratic	4th	January 3, 1969 – January 3, 1979	Elected in 1968. Retired.
Richard Irvine Manning I	Jacksonian	8th	December 8, 1834 – May 1, 1836	Elected to finish Blair's term. Died
Robert Marion	Democratic-Republican	1st	March 4, 1805 – December 4, 1810	Elected in 1804. Retired and resigned early.
William D. Martin	Jacksonian	4th	March 4, 1827 – March 3, 1831	Elected in 1826. Retired.
William Mayrant	Democratic-Republican	9th	March 4, 1815 – October 21, 1816	Elected in 1814. Lost re-election to S. Miller and resigned early.
Paul G. McCorkle	Democratic	5th	February 21, 1917 – March 3, 1917	Elected to finish Finley's term in the 64th Congress. Retired.
John McCreary	Democratic-Republican	8th	March 4, 1819 – March 3, 1821	Elected in 1818. Lost re-election to Gist.
George McDuffie	Democratic-Republican	6th	March 4, 1821 – March 3, 1823	Elected in 1820. Redistricted to the 5th district.
George McDuffie	Democratic-Republican	5th	March 4, 1823 – March 3, 1825	Redistricted from the 6th district and re-elected in 1823. Switched parties.
George McDuffie	Jacksonian	5th	March 4, 1825 – March 3, 1831	Re-elected in 1824 as a Jacksonian. Switched parties.
George McDuffie	Nullifier	5th	March 4, 1831 – ???, 1825	Re-elected in 1830 as a Nullifier. Resigned to become Governor.
John L. McLaurin	Democratic	6th	December 5, 1892 – May 31, 1897	Elected to finish Stackhouse's term. Resigned when appointed U.S. Senator.
Clara G. McMillan	Democratic	1st	November 7, 1939 – January 3, 1941	Elected to finish her husband's term. Retired.
John L. McMillan	Democratic	6th	January 3, 1939 – January 3, 1973	Elected in 1938. Lost renomination to Jenrette.
Thomas S. McMillan	Democratic	1st	March 4, 1925 – September 29, 1939	Elected in 1924. Died.
John McQueen	Democratic	4th	February 12, 1849 – March 3, 1853	Elected to finish Sims's term in the 30th and 31st Congresses. Redistricted to the 1st district.
John McQueen	Democratic	1st	March 4, 1853 – December 21, 1860	Redistricted from the 4th district and re-elected in 1853. Re-elected in 1860 but retired due to Civil War.
John J. McSwain	Democratic	4th	March 4, 1921 – August 6, 1936	Elected in 1920. Died.
Henry Middleton	Democratic-Republican	1st	March 4, 1815 – March 3, 1819	Elected in 1814. Retired.
William Porcher Miles	Democratic	2nd	March 4, 1857 – December 24, 1860	Re-elected in 1856. Re-elected in 1860 but retired due to Civil War.
Stephen Decatur Miller	Democratic-Republican	9th	January 2, 1817 – March 3, 1819	Elected to finish Mayrant's term. Retired.
Thomas E. Miller	Republican	7th	September 24, 1890 – March 3, 1891	Won election contest. Lost re-election to W. Elliott.
Thomas R. Mitchell	Democratic-Republican	3rd	March 4, 1821 – March 3, 1823	Elected in 1820. Lost re-election to R. Campbell.
Thomas R. Mitchell	Jacksonian	3rd	March 4, 1825 – March 3, 1829	Elected in 1824. Lost re-election to J. Campbell.
Thomas R. Mitchell	Jacksonian	3rd	March 4, 1831 – March 3, 1833	Elected in 1830. Lost re-election to Singleton.
Thomas Moore	Democratic-Republican	6th	March 4, 1801 – March 3, 1803	Elected in 1800. Redistricted to the 7th district.
Thomas Moore	Democratic-Republican	7th	March 4, 1803 – March 3, 1813	Redistricted from the 6th district and re-elected in 1803. Retired.
Thomas Moore	Democratic-Republican	8th	March 4, 1815 – March 3, 1817	Elected in 1814. Retired.
Mick Mulvaney	Republican	5th	January 3, 2011 – February 16, 2017	Elected in 2010. Resigned to become Director of the Office of Management and Budget.
George W. Murray	Republican	7th	March 4, 1893 – March 3, 1895	Elected in 1892. Redistricted to the 1st district.
George W. Murray	Republican	1st	June 4, 1896 – March 3, 1897	Won election contest. Lost re-election to W. Elliott.
John L. Napier	Republican	6th	January 3, 1981 – January 3, 1983	Elected in 1980. Lost re-election to Tallon.
Wilson Nesbitt	Democratic-Republican	8th	March 4, 1817 – March 3, 1819	Elected in 1816. Retired.
Samuel J. Nicholls	Democratic	4th	September 14, 1915 – March 3, 1921	Elected to finish Johnson's term. Retired.
Ralph Norman	Republican	5th	June 20, 2017 – present	Elected to finish Mulvaney's term.
James Norton	Democratic	6th	December 6, 1897 – March 3, 1901	Elected to finish McLaurin's term. Retired.
Abraham Nott	Federalist	6th	March 4, 1799 – March 3, 1801	Elected in 1798. Retired.
William T. Nuckolls	Jacksonian	7th	March 4, 1827 – March 3, 1833	Elected in 1826. Retired.
Michael P. O'Connor	Democratic	2nd	March 4, 1879 – April 26, 1881	Elected in 1878. Died pending an election contest.
James Lawrence Orr	Democratic	2nd	March 4, 1849 – March 3, 1853	Elected in 1848. Redistricted to the 5th district.
James Lawrence Orr	Democratic	5th	March 4, 1853 – March 3, 1859	Redistricted from the 2nd district and re-elected in 1853. Retired.
James Overstreet	Democratic-Republican	4th	March 4, 1819 – May 24, 1822	Elected in 1818. Died.
James O'H. Patterson	Democratic	2nd	March 4, 1905 – March 3, 1911	Elected in 1904. Retired.
Liz J. Patterson	Democratic	4th	January 3, 1987 – January 3, 1993	Elected in 1986. Lost re-election to Inglis.
William H. Perry	Democratic	4th	March 4, 1885 – March 3, 1891	Elected in 1884. Retired.
Andrew Pickens	Anti-Administration	6th	March 4, 1793 – March 3, 1795	Elected in 1793. Retired.
Francis Wilkinson Pickens	Nullifier	5th	December 8, 1834 – March 3, 1839	Elected to finish McDuffie's term. Switched parties.
Francis Wilkinson Pickens	Democratic	5th	March 4, 1839 – March 3, 1843	Re-elected in 1838 as a Democrat. Retired.
Charles Pinckney	Democratic-Republican	1st	March 4, 1819 – March 3, 1821	Elected in 1818. Retired.
Henry L. Pinckney	Nullifier	1st	March 4, 1833 – March 3, 1837	Elected in 1833. Lost renomination and lost re-election to H. Legaré as a Unionist.
Thomas Pinckney	Federalist	1st	November 23, 1797 – March 3, 1801	Elected to finish W. L. Smith's term. Retired.
Joel R. Poinsett	Democratic-Republican	1st	March 4, 1821 – March 3, 1825	Re-elected in 1820. Switched parties.
Joel R. Poinsett	Jacksonian	1st	March 4, 1825 – March 7, 1825	Re-elected in 1824 as a Jacksonian. Resigned to become U.S. Minister to Mexico.
J. Willard Ragsdale	Democratic	6th	March 4, 1913 – July 23, 1919	Elected in 1912. Died.
Joseph H. Rainey	Republican	1st	December 12, 1870 – March 3, 1879	Elected to finish Wittemore's term. Lost re-election to J. S. Richardson.
Alonzo J. Ransier	Republican	2nd	March 4, 1873 – March 3, 1875	Elected in 1872. Retired.
Arthur Ravenel, Jr.	Republican	1st	January 3, 1987 – January 3, 1995	Elected in 1986. Retired to run for Governor.
Robert Rhett	Democratic	2nd	March 4, 1837 – March 3, 1843	Elected in 1836. Redistricted to the 7th district.
Robert Rhett	Democratic	7th	March 4, 1843 – March 3, 1849	Redistricted from the 2nd district and re-elected in 1843. Retired.
Tom Rice	Republican	7th	January 3, 2013 – January 3, 2023	Elected in 2012. Lost renomination to Fry.
James P. Richards	Democratic	5th	March 4, 1933 – January 3, 1957	Elected in 1932. Retired.
John Peter Richardson II	Jacksonian	8th	December 19, 1836 – March 3, 1837	Elected to finish Manning's term. Swithced parties.
John Peter Richardson II	Democratic	8th	March 4, 1837 – March 3, 1839	Re-elected in 1836 as a Democrat. Retired.
John S. Richardson	Democratic	1st	March 4, 1879 – March 3, 1883	Elected in 1878. Retired.
Corinne Boyd Riley	Democratic	2nd	April 10, 1962 – January 3, 1963	Elected to finish her husband's term. Retired.
John J. Riley	Democratic	2nd	January 3, 1945 – January 3, 1949	Elected in 1944. Lost renomination to H. Sims.
John J. Riley	Democratic	2nd	January 3, 1951 – January 1, 1962	Elected in 1950. Died.
L. Mendel Rivers	Democratic	1st	January 3, 1941 – December 28, 1970	Elected in 1940. Died.
James Rogers	Jacksonian	7th	March 4, 1835 – March 3, 1837	Elected in 1834. Lost re-election to Clowney.
James Rogers	Democratic	7th	March 4, 1839 – March 3, 1843	Elected in 1838. Retired.
John Rutledge, Jr.	Federalist	2nd	March 4, 1797 – March 3, 1803	Elected in 1796. Lost re-election to W. Butler.
Mark Sanford	Republican	1st	January 3, 1995 – January 3, 2001	Elected in 1994. Retired to run for Governor.
Mark Sanford	Republican	1st	May 7, 2013 – January 3, 2019	Elected to finish Scott's term. Lost renomination to Katie Arrington.
Robert B. Scarborough	Democratic	6th	March 4, 1901 – March 3, 1905	Elected in 1900. Retired.
Tim Scott	Republican	1st	January 3, 2011 – January 2, 2013	Elected in 2010. Re-elected in 2012 but resigned when appointed U.S. Senator.
George W. Shell	Democratic	4th	March 4, 1891 – March 3, 1895	Elected in 1890. Retired.
Eldred Simkins	Democratic-Republican	6th	January 24, 1818 – March 3, 1821	Elected to finish Calhoun's term. Retired.
Richard F. Simpson	Democratic	2nd	March 4, 1843 – March 3, 1849	Elected in 1843. Retired.
Alexander D. Sims	Democratic	4th	March 4, 1845 – November 22, 1848	Elected in 1844. Re-elected in 1848 but died before next term began.
Hugo S. Sims, Jr.	Democratic	2nd	January 3, 1949 – January 3, 1951	Elected in 1948. Lost renomination to J. Riley
Thomas D. Singleton	Nullifier	3rd	March 4, 1833 – November 25, 1833	Elected in 1833. Died.
Robert Smalls	Republican	5th	March 4, 1875 – March 3, 1879	Elected in 1874. Lost re-election to Tillman.
Robert Smalls	Republican	5th	July 19, 1882 – March 3, 1883	Won contested election. Retired.
Robert Smalls	Republican	7th	March 18, 1884 – March 3, 1887	Elected to finish Mackey's term. Lost re-election to Elliott.
O'Brien Smith	Democratic-Republican	4th	March 4, 1805 – March 3, 1807	Elected in 1804. Retired.
William Smith	Democratic-Republican	6th	March 4, 1797 – March 3, 1799	Elected in 1796. Lost re-election to Nott.
William L. Smith	Pro-Administration	1st	March 4, 1789 – March 3, 1795	Elected in 1788. Switched parties.
William L. Smith	Federalist	1st	March 4, 1795 – July 10, 1797	Re-elected in 1794 as a Federalist. Resigned to become U.S. Minister to Portugal
Floyd Spence	Republican	2nd	January 3, 1971 – August 16, 2001	Elected in 1970. Died.
John Spratt	Democratic	5th	January 3, 1983 – January 3, 2011	Elected in 1982. Lost re-election to Mulvaney.
Eli T. Stackhouse	Democratic	6th	March 4, 1891 – June 14, 1892	Elected in 1890. Died.
William F. Stevenson	Democratic	5th	March 4, 1917 – March 3, 1933	Elected to finish Finley's term in the 65th Congress. Lost renomination to Richards.
J. William Stokes	Democratic	7th	March 4, 1895 – June 1, 1896	Elected in 1894. Seat declared vacant due to election fraud.
J. William Stokes	Democratic	7th	November 3, 1896 – July 6, 1901	Elected to finish his own term. Died.
Philip H. Stoll	Democratic	6th	October 7, 1919 – March 3, 1923	Elected to finish Ragsdale's term. Lost renomination to Gasque.
Thomas J. Strait	Democratic	5th	March 4, 1893 – March 3, 1899	Elected in 1892. Lost renomination to Finley.
Thomas Sumter	Anti-Administration	4th	March 4, 1789 – March 3, 1793	Elected in 1788. Retired.
Thomas Sumter	Democratic-Republican	4th	March 4, 1797 – December 15, 1801	Elected in 1796. Resigned when elected U.S. Senator.
Thomas De Lage Sumter	Democratic	8th	March 4, 1839 – March 3, 1843	Elected in 1838. Redistricted to the 3rd district and lost re-election to Woodward.
W. Jasper Talbert	Democratic	2nd	March 4, 1893 – March 3, 1903	Elected in 1892. Retired to run for Governor.
Robin Tallon	Democratic	6th	January 3, 1983 – January 3, 1993	Elected in 1982. Retired.
John Taylor	Democratic-Republican	4th	March 4, 1807 – December 30, 1810	Elected in 1806. Lost re-election to Lowndes and resigned early.
John Taylor	Democratic-Republican	7th	March 4, 1815 – March 3, 1817	Elected in 1814. Lost re-election to E. Earle.
John C. Taylor	Democratic	3rd	March 4, 1933 – January 3, 1939	Elected in 1932. Lost renomination to B. Hare.
Waddy Thompson, Jr.	Anti-Jacksonian	6th	September 10, 1835 – March 3, 1837	Elected to finish Davis's term. Switched parties.
Waddy Thompson, Jr.	Whig	6th	March 4, 1837 – March 3, 1841	Re-elected in 1836 as a Whig. Retired.
George D. Tillman	Democratic	5th	March 4, 1879 – July 19, 1882	Elected in 1878. Lost contested election to Smalls.
George D. Tillman	Democratic	2nd	March 4, 1883 – March 3, 1893	Elected in 1882. Lost renomination to Talbert.
William Timmons	Republican	4th	January 3, 2019 – present	Elected in 2018.
Samuel W. Trotti	Democratic	4th	December 17, 1842 – March 3, 1843	Elected to finish Butler's term. Retired.
Starling Tucker	Democratic-Republican	5th	March 4, 1817 – March 3, 1823	Elected in 1816. Redistricted to the 9th district.
Starling Tucker	Democratic-Republican	9th	March 4, 1823 – March 3, 1825	Redistricted from the 5th district and re-elected in 1823. Switched parties.
Starling Tucker	Jacksonian	9th	March 4, 1825 – March 3, 1831	Re-elected in 1824 as a Jacksonian. Retired.
Thomas T. Tucker	Anti-Administration	5th	March 4, 1789 – March 3, 1793	Elected in 1788. Retired.
Alexander S. Wallace	Republican	4th	May 27, 1870 – March 3, 1877	Successfully contested election of William D. Simpson. Lost re-election to Evins.
Daniel Wallace	Democratic	1st	June 12, 1848 – March 3, 1853	Elected to finish Black's term. Retired.
Albert Watson	Democratic	2nd	January 3, 1963 – February 1, 1965	Elected in 1962. Resigned to contest special election as a Republican.
Albert Watson	Republican	2nd	June 15, 1965 – January 3, 1971	Elected to finish his term as a Republican. Retired to run for Governor.
Richard S. Whaley	Democratic	1st	April 29, 1913 – March 3, 1921	Elected to finish Legaré's term. Retired.
Benjamin F. Whittemore	Republican	1st	July 18, 1868 – February 24, 1870	Elected to finish the short term. Resigned.
David Rogerson Williams	Democratic-Republican	3rd	March 4, 1805 – March 3, 1809	Elected in 1804. Retired.
David Rogerson Williams	Democratic-Republican	3rd	March 4, 1811 – March 3, 1813	Elected in 1810. Retired.
Joe Wilson	Republican	2nd	December 18, 2001 – present	Elected to finish Spence's term.
John Wilson	Democratic-Republican	7th	March 4, 1821 – March 3, 1823	Elected in 1820. Redistricted to the 6th district.
John Wilson	Democratic-Republican	6th	March 4, 1823 – March 3, 1825	Redistricted from the 7th district and re-elected in 1823. Switched parties.
John Wilson	Jacksonian	6th	March 4, 1825 – March 3, 1827	Re-elected in 1824 as a Jacksonian. Lost re-election to W. Davis.
Stanyarne Wilson	Democratic	4th	March 4, 1895 – March 3, 1901	Elected in 1894. Retired.
Richard Winn	Anti-Administration	4th	March 4, 1793 – March 3, 1795	Elected in 1793. Switched parties.
Richard Winn	Democratic-Republican	4th	March 4, 1795 – March 3, 1797	Re-elected in 1794 as a Democratic-Republican. Lost re-election to T. Sumter.
Richard Winn	Democratic-Republican	4th	January 24, 1802 – March 3, 1803	Elected to finish Sumter's term. Redistricted to the 5th district.
Richard Winn	Democratic-Republican	5th	March 4, 1803 – March 3, 1813	Redistricted from the 4th district and re-elected in 1803. Retired.
Robert Witherspoon	Democratic-Republican	3rd	March 4, 1809 – March 3, 1811	Elected in 1808. Retired.
Joseph A. Woodward	Democratic	3rd	March 4, 1843 – March 3, 1853	Elected in 1843. Retired.
William Woodward	Democratic-Republican	5th	March 4, 1815 – March 3, 1817	Elected in 1814. Lost re-election to S. Tucker.
Edward Lunn Young	Republican	6th	January 3, 1973 – January 3, 1975	Elected in 1972. Lost re-election to Jenrette.

== See also ==
- List of United States senators from South Carolina
- South Carolina's congressional delegations
- South Carolina's congressional districts
