= Thomas Earl House =

Thomas Earl House may refer to:

- Thomas Earl House (Napa, California), listed on the National Register of Historic Places in Napa County, California
- Thomas Earl House (Ann Arbor, Michigan), listed on the National Register of Historic Places in Washtenaw County, Michigan
