= Earle Town House =

Historic house in South Carolina, United States

- U.S. National Register of Historic Places
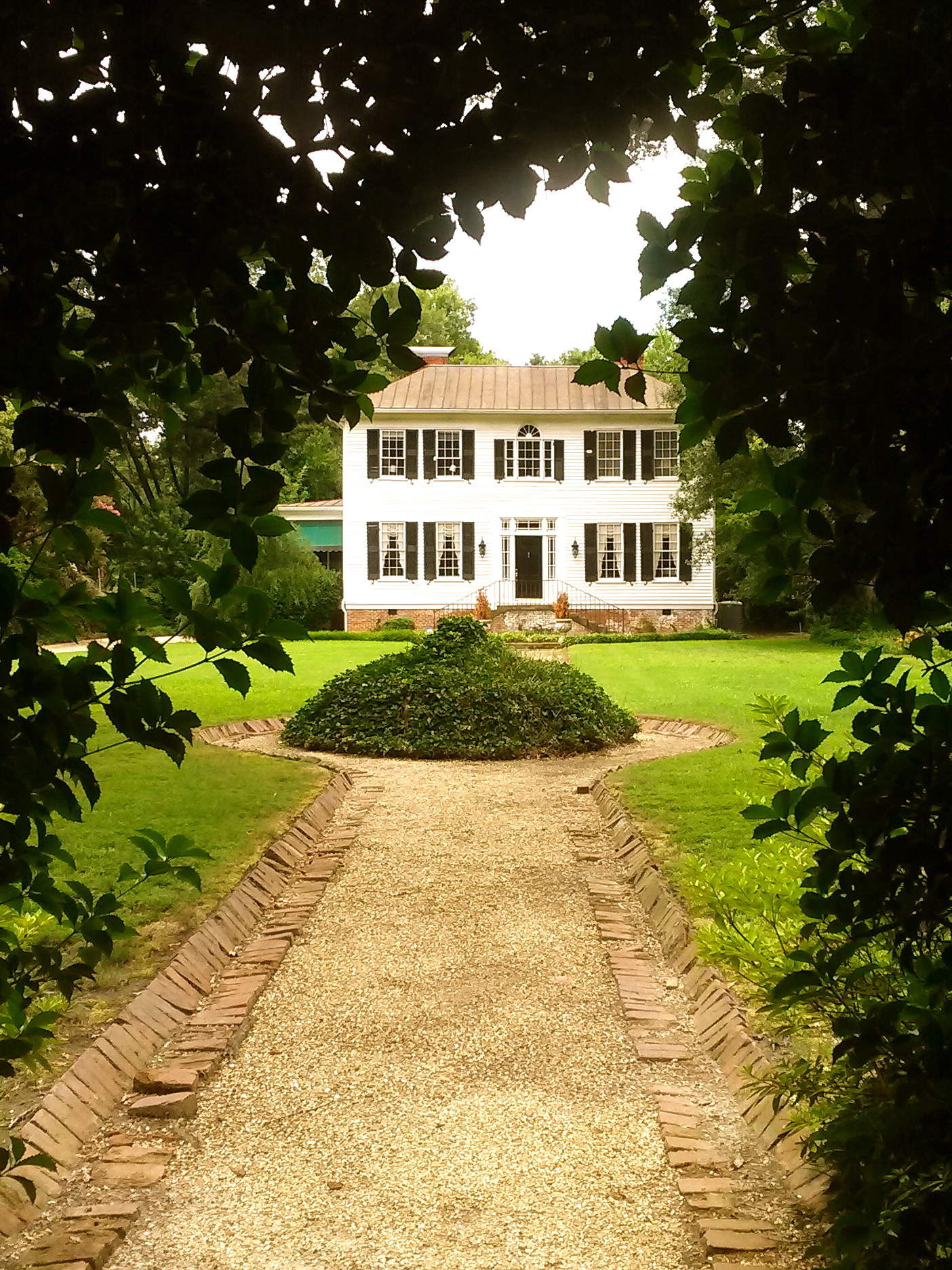
- Earle Town House, August 2014

- Location within South Carolina Location within the United States
- Location: 107 James Street, Greenville, South Carolina
- Coordinates: 34°51′49″N 82°24′24″W
- Area: less than one acre
- Built: c. 1829-34
- Architectural style: Georgian
- NRHP reference No.: 69000167
- Added to NRHP: August 5, 1969

Earle Town House is a historic house in Greenville, South Carolina. It was listed in the National Register of Historic Places on August 5, 1969, and is included in the Col. Elias Earle Historic District.

Until the end of the 20th century, the house was widely believed to have been built about 1810 for Congressman Elias T. Earle; but Earle never owned the property. The house is more likely to have been built c. 1829-1833 by one Samuel Green or possibly as late as 1834 after the land had been acquired by Elias Drayton Earle, half nephew and son-in-law of Elias T. Earle.

In 1856 James A. David bought the house and 35 acres. His son, Charles A. David (1853-1934)—a merchant by profession and essayist, humorist, and cartoonist by avocation—lived in it until 1922. David described it as a "rambling old affair" with a framework "mortised and put together with wooden pegs....The ceilings were so high, the only way it could have been heated in winter would have been to set it on fire."

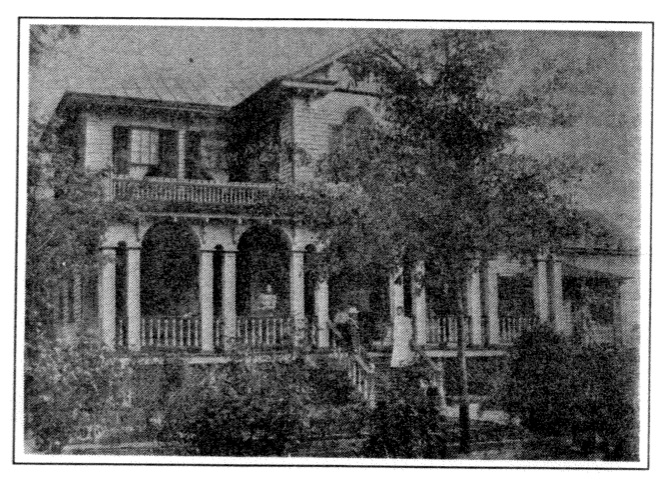
The Earle Town House as it appeared c. 1900 when owned by Charles David.

In December 1927, the house was bought by Mary Chevillette Simms Oliphant, granddaughter of 19th-century novelist William Gilmore Simms and the author in her own right of more than a dozen books, including a once widely adopted public school history of South Carolina. In the 1920s Oliphant had Greenville architect William Riddle Ward renovate the house to what she believed was its original Federal style, demolishing one wing, removing the colonnaded porch, and adding three rooms to the second floor. Some original features were preserved, including hand-hewn timbers, brick and rock supports, six-paneled doors, a hand-carved mantelpiece, and a Palladian window in the second story. Oliphant was able to have her house and nearby Whitehall listed on the National Register, the first buildings in Greenville to be so recognized. She also organized a successful petition campaign to dissuade local officials from running a proposed highway bypass through James Street.
