= Joseph Gist =

American politician

Member of the U.S. House of Representatives from South Carolina
- In office March 4, 1821 – March 4, 1827
- Preceded by: John McCreary (8th); John Wilson (7th)
- Succeeded by: John Carter (8th); William T. Nuckolls (7th)
- Constituency: 8th district (1821-23); 7th district (1823-27)

Member of the South Carolina House of Representatives
- In office 1802–1817

Personal details
- Born: January 12, 1775 Union District, Province of South Carolina, British America
- Died: March 8, 1836 (aged 61) Pinckneyville, South Carolina, U.S.
- Party: Jacksonian (after 1825)
- Other political affiliations: Democratic-Republican (until 1825)
- Profession: lawyer

Joseph Gist (January 12, 1775 – March 8, 1836) was a U.S. representative from South Carolina.

Born near the mouth of Fair Forest Creek in the Union District of the Province of South Carolina. Gist moved to Charleston with his parents in 1788. He attended common schools. He graduated from the College of Charleston. He studied law, was admitted to the bar in 1799, and began practice in Pinckneyville, South Carolina, in 1800. He served as member of the State house of representatives from 1802 to 1817. He served as member of the board of trustees of South Carolina College at Columbia 1809–1821.

Gist was elected as a Democratic-Republican to the 17th congress, re-elected as a Jackson Democratic-Republican to the 18th congress, and elected as a Jacksonian to the 19th congress. He was not a candidate for renomination, resuming the practice of law.

He died in Pinckneyville, on March 8, 1836 and was interred in his family's burial ground.

== Sources ==
- United States Congress. "Joseph Gist (id: G000227)". Biographical Directory of the United States Congress.

U.S. House of Representatives
Preceded by John McCreary	Member of the U.S. House of Representatives from South Carolina's 8th congressional district 1821–1823	Succeeded by John Carter
Preceded by John Wilson	Member of the U.S. House of Representatives from South Carolina's 7th congressional district 1823–1827	Succeeded by William T. Nuckolls
