= John McCreary =

American politician

Member of the U.S. House of Representatives from South Carolina's 8th district
- In office March 4, 1819 – March 3, 1821
- Preceded by: Wilson Nesbitt
- Succeeded by: Joseph Gist

Member of the South Carolina House of Representatives
- In office 1802
- In office 1794–1799

Personal details
- Born: c. 1761 Chester County, Province of South Carolina, British America
- Died: November 4, 1833 (aged 71–72) Chester County, South Carolina, U.S.
- Resting place: Chester County, South Carolina
- Party: Democratic-Republican
- Occupation: planter, surveyor

John McCreary (c. 1761 – November 4, 1833) was a U.S. representative from South Carolina.

== Biography ==
=== Early life ===
John McCreary was born in approximately 1761 near Fishing Creek Lake, about eighteen miles from Chester in the Province of South Carolina. He received his schooling from private tutors.

=== Career ===
He became a surveyor. He also engaged in agricultural pursuits, and he ran a Southern plantation in South Carolina. Later, he served in the Revolutionary War.

He was a member of the South Carolina House of Representatives from 1794 to 1799 and 1802. He was elected as a Democratic-Republican to the Sixteenth Congress, where he served from March 4, 1819, to March 3, 1821.

He resumed agricultural pursuits and surveying.

=== Death ===
He died on his plantation in South Carolina on November 4, 1833. He was buried in the Richardson Church Cemetery, Chester County, South Carolina.

== Sources ==
- United States Congress. "John McCreary (id: M000383)". Biographical Directory of the United States Congress.

U.S. House of Representatives
Preceded by Wilson Nesbitt	Member of the U.S. House of Representatives from South Carolina's 8th congressional district 1819–1821	Succeeded by Joseph Gist
