= Warren R. Davis =

American politician (1793–1835)

Warren Ransom Davis

Chair of the House Judiciary Committee
- In office 1831–1832
- Preceded by: James Buchanan
- Succeeded by: John Bell

Member of the U.S. House of Representatives from South Carolina's 6th district
- In office March 4, 1827 – January 29, 1835
- Preceded by: John Wilson
- Succeeded by: Waddy Thompson, Jr.

Personal details
- Born: May 8, 1793 Columbia, South Carolina, U.S.
- Died: January 29, 1835 (aged 41) Washington, D.C., U.S.
- Resting place: Congressional Cemetery, Washington, D.C.
- Party: Democratic (1827–1831); Nullifier (1831–1835)
- Education: South Carolina College
- Profession: attorney

Warren Ransom Davis (May 8, 1793 – January 29, 1835) was an American attorney and representative from South Carolina's 6th congressional district from 1827 to 1835.

Davis was born in Columbia, South Carolina, pursued preparatory studies and graduated from South Carolina College (now the University of South Carolina Columbia) in 1810, where he was a member of the Euphradian Society. He studied law and was admitted to the bar in 1814, practicing in Pendleton. He later served as state solicitor of the western circuit from 1818 to 1824.

Davis was elected as a Jacksonian to the 20th United States Congress and 21st Congresses, reelected as a Nullifier to the 22nd through 24th Congresses and served from March 4, 1827, until his death in Washington, D.C., on January 29, 1835, before the opening of the 24th Congress. During the 22nd Congress he was chairman of the Committee on the Judiciary.

On the day after his death, his funeral was disrupted by an assassination attempt on President Andrew Jackson by a deranged house painter, Richard Lawrence. Davis is interred in the Congressional Cemetery.

== See also ==
- List of members of the United States Congress who died in office (1790–1899)

U.S. House of Representatives
Preceded by John Wilson	Member of the U.S. House of Representatives from South Carolina's 6th congressional district 1827–1835	Succeeded by Waddy Thompson, Jr.
