= John Wilson (South Carolina politician, born 1773) =

American politician

Member of the U.S. House of Representatives from South Carolina
- In office March 4, 1821 – March 4, 1827
- Preceded by: Elias Earle (7th); George McDuffie (6th)
- Succeeded by: Joseph Gist (7th); Warren R. Davis (6th)
- Constituency: 7th district (1821-23); 6th district (1823-27)

Member of the South Carolina House of Representatives
- In office 1812–1817

Personal details
- Born: August 11, 1773 Wilson's Ferry, Province of South Carolina, British America
- Died: August 13, 1828 (aged 55) Golden Grove, South Carolina, U.S.
- Resting place: Pelzer, South Carolina
- Party: Democratic-Republican (1823–1825)
- Other political affiliations: Jacksonian (1825–onward)
- Profession: planter

John Wilson (August 11, 1773 – August 13, 1828) was a U.S. representative from South Carolina.

Born at Wilson's Ferry in the Province of South Carolina, Wilson attended the common schools. He engaged in agricultural pursuits in Anderson County, near Golden Grove, South Carolina. Also, he operated a public ferry across the Saluda River at what is now known as Pelzer. He served as member of the State house of representatives from 1812 to 1817.

Wilson was elected to the Seventeenth, Eighteenth and Nineteenth Congresses (March 4, 1821 – March 3, 1827).

He was an unsuccessful candidate for re-election in 1826 to the Twentieth Congress.

He died at his home near Golden Grove, in Anderson County, South Carolina, August 13, 1828. He was interred in the family cemetery on his plantation, which is now a part of the industrial city of Pelzer, South Carolina.

== See also ==
- List of United States representatives from South Carolina
- Politics of the United States

== Sources ==
- United States Congress. "John Wilson (id: W000597)". Biographical Directory of the United States Congress.

U.S. House of Representatives
Preceded by Elias Earle	Member of the U.S. House of Representatives from South Carolina's 7th congressional district 1821–1823	Succeeded by Joseph Gist
Preceded by George McDuffie	Member of the U.S. House of Representatives from South Carolina's 6th congressional district 1823–1827	Succeeded by Warren R. Davis
