= John Taylor (14th Congress) =

American politician

Member of the U.S. House of Representatives from South Carolina's 7th district
- In office March 4, 1815 – March 3, 1817
- Preceded by: Elias Earle
- Succeeded by: Elias Earle

Member of the South Carolina House of Representatives
- In office 1802–1805

Personal details
- Party: Democratic-Republican

John Taylor (d. July 12, 1821) was a United States representative from South Carolina. His birth date is unknown. Taylor was a member of the South Carolina House of Representatives, 1802–1805. He was elected as a Republican to the Fourteenth Congress (March 4, 1815 – March 3, 1817) but was an unsuccessful candidate for reelection to the Fifteenth Congress in 1816 and for election to the Seventeenth Congress in 1820.

After his time in Congress he served as receiver of public monies at the U.S. government land office at Cahawba, Alabama.

He died on July 12, 1821 in Cahawba.

He married Mary Margaret Smith, the daughter of South Carolina Senator William Smith. Their daughter, Mary Margaret Smith Taylor, married journalist and planter Meredith Calhoun.

U.S. House of Representatives
Preceded by Elias Earle	Member of the U.S. House of Representatives from South Carolina's 7th congressional district 1815–1817	Succeeded by Elias Earle
