= Thomas Moore (South Carolina congressman) =

American politician

Member of the U.S. House of Representatives from South Carolina
- In office March 4, 1801 – March 3, 1813
- Preceded by: Abraham Nott (6th); District established (7th)
- Succeeded by: Levi Casey (6th); Elias Earle (7th)
- Constituency: 6th district (1801-03); 7th district (1803-13)
- In office March 4, 1815 – March 3, 1817
- Preceded by: Samuel Farrow
- Succeeded by: Wilson Nesbitt
- Constituency: 8th district

Member of the South Carolina House of Representatives
- In office 1794–1799

Personal details
- Born: 1759 Spartanburg District, Province of South Carolina, British America
- Died: July 11, 1822 (aged 62–63) Spartanburg County, South Carolina, U.S.
- Resting place: Moore's Station, South Carolina
- Party: Democratic-Republican
- Occupation: planter

Military service
- Allegiance: United States of America
- Rank: Brigadier General
- Battles/wars: American Revolutionary War; War of 1812

Thomas Moore (1759 – July 11, 1822) was a member of the United States House of Representatives and planter from South Carolina.

Born in the Spartanburg District of the Province of South Carolina, Moore served during the Revolutionary War, taking part in the Battle of Cowpens at the age of 16. He served in the South Carolina House of Representatives to 1794 to 1799. In 1800, he was elected a Democratic-Republican to the seventh congress, serving from 1801 to 1813. He served as a brigadier general in the War of 1812 and afterwards engaged in planting. Moore was one of the founders of the first high schools in Spartanburg District. In 1814, he was elected to the Fourteenth Congress, serving again from 1815 to 1817. Afterwards, he resumed engaging in agricultural pursuits. He owned slaves. He died near Moores Station of Spartanburg County, South Carolina, in 1822 and was interred in Moore's Burying Ground.

According to one source, he was the brother of the legendary heroine of Cowpens, Kate Barry.

U.S. House of Representatives
Preceded by Abraham Nott	Member of the U.S. House of Representatives from South Carolina's 6th congressional district 1801–1803	Succeeded by Levi Casey
Preceded by District established	Member of the U.S. House of Representatives from South Carolina's 7th congressional district 1803–1813	Succeeded by Elias Earle
Preceded by Samuel Farrow	Member of the U.S. House of Representatives from South Carolina's 8th congressional district 1815–1817	Succeeded by Wilson Nesbitt
