= William K. Clowney =

American politician

William Kennedy Clowney

39th Lieutenant Governor of South Carolina
- In office December 9, 1840 – December 8, 1842
- Governor: John Peter Richardson II
- Preceded by: Barnabas Kelet Henagan
- Succeeded by: Isaac Donnom Witherspoon

Member of the South Carolina Senate
- In office 1840

Member of the U.S. House of Representatives from South Carolina's 7th district
- In office March 4, 1837 – March 3, 1839
- Preceded by: James Rogers
- Succeeded by: James Rogers
- In office March 4, 1833 – March 3, 1835
- Preceded by: William T. Nuckolls
- Succeeded by: James Rogers

Member of the South Carolina House of Representatives
- In office 1830–1831

Personal details
- Born: March 21, 1797 Pinckney District, South Carolina
- Died: March 12, 1851 (aged 53) Union, South Carolina
- Party: Nullifier
- Profession: lawyer

William Kennedy Clowney (March 21, 1797 – March 12, 1851) was a U.S. representative from South Carolina from the year 1837 to 1839 and was also the 39th lieutenant governor of South Carolina from 1840 to 1842.

== Biography ==
=== Early life ===
Born in Union County, South Carolina, Clowney attended private schools and an academy. He graduated from the South Carolina College at Columbia in 1818.

=== Career ===
He taught in the public schools of Unionville and later at the University of South Carolina. He served as member of the State house of representatives 1830–1831. He was admitted to the bar and began practice in Union. He served as commissioner in equity of South Carolina 1830–1833.

He was elected as a Nullifier to the Twenty-third Congress (March 4, 1833 – March 3, 1835) and then again as a Nullifier to the Twenty-fifth Congress (March 4, 1837 – March 3, 1839). He served as chairman of the Committee on Expenditures in the Department of War for the Twenty-fifth Congress. He served as member of the State senate in 1840. He also served as Lieutenant Governor of South Carolina.

=== Death ===
He died in Union, South Carolina, on March 12, 1851, and was interred in Fairforest Cemetery, South Carolina.

== Sources ==
- United States Congress. "William K. Clowney (id: C000534)". Biographical Directory of the United States Congress.

U.S. House of Representatives
Preceded by William T. Nuckolls	Member of the U.S. House of Representatives from South Carolina's 7th congressional district 1833–1835	Succeeded by James Rogers
Preceded by James Rogers	Member of the U.S. House of Representatives from South Carolina's 7th congressional district 1837–1839	Succeeded by James Rogers
Political offices
Preceded by Barnabas Kelet Henagan	Lieutenant Governor of South Carolina; 1840–1842	Succeeded by Isaac Donnom Witherspoon
