= William Smith (South Carolina politician, born 1751) =

American politician

Member of the U.S. House of Representatives from South Carolina's 6th district
- In office March 4, 1797 – March 3, 1799
- Preceded by: Samuel Earle
- Succeeded by: Abraham Nott

Member of the South Carolina Senate from the Spartanburg District
- In office 1810–1818
- In office 1790–1795

Personal details
- Born: September 20, 1751 Bucks County, Province of Pennsylvania, British America
- Died: June 22, 1837 (aged 85) Spartanburg District, South Carolina, U.S.
- Party: Democratic-Republican
- Profession: planter, politician, judge

Military service
- Allegiance: United States
- Battles/wars: American Revolutionary War

William Smith (September 20, 1751 – June 22, 1837) was a U.S. congressman, state senator and judge from South Carolina.

Smith was born in Bucks County in the Province of Pennsylvania, the oldest son of Ralph Smith and Mercy Penquite Smith. He moved to what became Spartanburg District, South Carolina with his family in 1765, where he became a planter. He fought in the Revolutionary War and served as a county judge from 1785 to 1797. He served in the South Carolina Senate from the Spartanburg District from 1790 to 1796 and was later elected a Democratic-Republican to the fifth congress serving from 1797 to 1799. He was elected back to the South Carolina Senate serving from 1810 to 1818. He died in the Spartanburg District in 1837.

U.S. House of Representatives
Preceded by Samuel Earle	Member of the U.S. House of Representatives from South Carolina's 6th congressional district 1797–1799	Succeeded by Abraham Nott
