= James Rogers (South Carolina politician) =

American politician

Member of the U.S. House of Representatives from South Carolina's 7th district
- In office March 4, 1839 – March 3, 1843
- Preceded by: William K. Clowney
- Succeeded by: Robert B. Rhett
- In office March 4, 1835 – March 3, 1837
- Preceded by: William K. Clowney
- Succeeded by: William K. Clowney

Personal details
- Born: October 24, 1795 Pinckney District, South Carolina
- Died: December 21, 1873 (aged 78) South Carolina
- Resting place: Newberry, South Carolina
- Party: Democratic
- Other political affiliations: Jacksonian (until 1837)

James Rogers (October 24, 1795 – December 21, 1873) was a United States representative from South Carolina. He was born in what is now Goshen Hill Township, Union County, South Carolina. He completed preparatory studies and graduated from South Carolina College at Columbia, South Carolina, in 1813. Later, he studied law and was admitted to the bar and began practice in Yorkville (now York), South Carolina.

Rogers held various local offices before he was elected as a Jacksonian to the Twenty-fourth Congress (March 4, 1835 – March 3, 1837). He was an unsuccessful candidate for reelection in 1836 to the Twenty-fifth Congress. Years later, he was elected as a Democrat to the Twenty-sixth and Twenty-seventh Congresses (March 4, 1839 – March 3, 1843). He died in South Carolina, on December 21, 1873, and was buried in what was formerly called the Irish Graveyard at Kings Creek A.R.P. Church near Newberry, South Carolina.

U.S. House of Representatives
Preceded by William K. Clowney	Member of the U.S. House of Representatives from South Carolina's 7th congressional district 1835–1837	Succeeded by William K. Clowney
Preceded by William K. Clowney	Member of the U.S. House of Representatives from South Carolina's 7th congressional district 1839–1843	Succeeded by Robert B. Rhett
