= South Carolina's 8th congressional district =

- Obsolete district
- Created: 1800
- Eliminated: 1840
- Years active: 1803–1843

South Carolina's 8th congressional district was a congressional district for the United States House of Representatives in South Carolina. It was created in 1803 as a result of the 1800 census and eliminated in 1843 as a result of the 1840 census. The district was last represented by Thomas De Lage Sumter.

== List of members representing the district ==
Member (Residence)	Party	Years	Cong ress	Electoral history	District location
District established March 4, 1803
John B. Earle (Anderson County)	Democratic-Republican	March 4, 1803 – March 3, 1805	8th	Elected in 1803. Re-elected in 1804 but declined the seat.	1803–1813 "Pendleton district"
Vacant		March 4, 1805 – December 2, 1805	9th		1803–1813 "Pendleton district"
Elias Earle (Greenville)	Democratic-Republican	December 2, 1805 – March 3, 1807	9th	Elected September 26–27, 1805 to finish his nephew's term and seated December 2, 1805. Lost re-election.	1803–1813 "Pendleton district"
Lemuel J. Alston (Greenville)	Democratic-Republican	March 4, 1807 – March 3, 1811	10th 11th	Elected in 1806. Re-elected in 1808. Retired.	1803–1813 "Pendleton district"
Elias Earle (Centerville)	Democratic-Republican	March 4, 1811 – March 3, 1813	12th	Elected in 1810. Redistricted to the 7th district.	1803–1813 "Pendleton district"
Samuel Farrow (Spartanburg)	Democratic-Republican	March 4, 1813 – March 3, 1815	13th	Elected in 1812. Retired.	1813–1823 "Chester district"
Thomas Moore (Prices Store)	Democratic-Republican	March 4, 1815 – March 3, 1817	14th	Elected in 1814. Retired.	1813–1823 "Chester district"
Wilson Nesbitt (Spartanburg)	Democratic-Republican	March 4, 1817 – March 3, 1819	15th	Elected in 1816. Retired.	1813–1823 "Chester district"
John McCreary (Chester)	Democratic-Republican	March 4, 1819 – March 3, 1821	16th	Elected in 1818. Lost re-election.	1813–1823 "Chester district"
Joseph Gist (Pinckneyville)	Democratic-Republican	March 4, 1821 – March 3, 1823	17th	Elected in 1820. Redistricted to the 7th district.	1813–1823 "Chester district"
John Carter (Camden)	Democratic-Republican	March 4, 1823 – March 3, 1825	18th 19th 20th	Redistricted from the 9th district and re-elected in 1823. Re-elected in 1824. Re-elected in 1826. Retired.	1823–1833 "Kershaw district"
John Carter (Camden)	Jacksonian	March 4, 1825 – March 3, 1829	18th 19th 20th	Redistricted from the 9th district and re-elected in 1823. Re-elected in 1824. Re-elected in 1826. Retired.	1823–1833 "Kershaw district"
James Blair (Lynchwood)	Jacksonian	March 4, 1829 – April 1, 1834	21st 22nd 23rd	Elected in 1828. Re-elected in 1830. Re-elected in 1833. Died.	1823–1833 "Kershaw district"
James Blair (Lynchwood)	Jacksonian	March 4, 1829 – April 1, 1834	21st 22nd 23rd	Elected in 1828. Re-elected in 1830. Re-elected in 1833. Died.	1833–1843 [data missing]
Vacant		April 1, 1834 – December 8, 1834	23rd		1833–1843 [data missing]
Richard I. Manning (Columbia)	Jacksonian	December 8, 1834 – May 1, 1836	23rd 24th	Elected June 3, 1834 to finish Blair's term and seated December 8, 1834. Also elected to the next full term. Died.	1833–1843 [data missing]
Vacant		May 1, 1836 – December 19, 1836	24th		1833–1843 [data missing]
John P. Richardson (Spartanburg)	Jacksonian	December 19, 1836 – March 3, 1837	24th 25th	Elected October 11, 1836 to finish Manning's term and seated December 19, 1836. Also elected to the next full term. Retired.	1833–1843 [data missing]
John P. Richardson (Spartanburg)	Democratic	March 4, 1837 – March 3, 1839	24th 25th	Elected October 11, 1836 to finish Manning's term and seated December 19, 1836. Also elected to the next full term. Retired.	1833–1843 [data missing]
Thomas D. Sumter (Stateburg)	Democratic	March 4, 1839 – March 3, 1843	26th 27th	Elected in 1838. Re-elected in 1840. Redistricted to the 3rd district and lost re-election.	1833–1843 [data missing]
District dissolved March 3, 1843
