= Lemuel J. Alston =

American politician (1760–1836)

Lemuel James Alston

Member of the U.S. House of Representatives from South Carolina's 8th district
- In office March 4, 1807 – March 3, 1811
- Preceded by: Elias Earle
- Succeeded by: Elias Earle

Member of the South Carolina House of Representatives
- In office 1789 – 1790

Personal details
- Born: 1760 Granville County, Province of North Carolina, British America
- Died: 1836 (aged 75–76) Clarke County, Alabama, U.S.
- Party: Democratic-Republican
- Profession: lawyer

Lemuel James Alston (1760–1836) was a slave owner and U.S. Representative from South Carolina.

Born in the eastern part of Granville County (which is now Warren County) in the Province of North Carolina, Alston moved to South Carolina after the Revolutionary War and settled near Greens Mill, which soon became the town of Greenville, South Carolina. He studied law and was admitted to the bar and commenced practice in Greenville. He served as member of the South Carolina House of Representatives from 1789 to 1790.

Alston was elected as a Democratic-Republican to the Tenth and Eleventh Congresses (March 4, 1807 – March 3, 1811). He moved in 1816 to Clarke County, Alabama, and settled near Grove Hill, Alabama where he presided over the orphans' court and the county court from November 1816 until May 1821. He died at "Alston Place," Clarke County, Alabama, in 1836.

== Sources ==
- United States Congress. "Lemuel J. Alston (id: A000165)". Biographical Directory of the United States Congress.

U.S. House of Representatives
Preceded by Elias Earle	Member of the U.S. House of Representatives from South Carolina's 8th congressional district 1807–1811	Succeeded by Elias Earle
