= Samuel Farrow =

American politician (1762–1824)

Member of the U.S. House of Representatives from South Carolina's 8th district
- In office March 4, 1813 – March 3, 1815
- Preceded by: Elias Earle
- Succeeded by: Thomas Moore

Member of the South Carolina House of Representatives
- In office 1816–1819
- In office 1822–1823

24th Lieutenant Governor of South Carolina
- In office December 8, 1810 – December 10, 1812
- Governor: Henry Middleton
- Preceded by: Frederick Nance
- Succeeded by: Eldred Simkins

Personal details
- Born: June 8, 1762 Prince William County, Virginia Colony, British America
- Died: November 18, 1824 (aged 62) Columbia, South Carolina, U.S.
- Party: Democratic-Republican
- Profession: lawyer

Samuel Farrow (June 8, 1762 – November 18, 1824) was a U.S. representative from South Carolina.

Born in Prince William County in the Colony of Virginia in 1762, Farrow moved to South Carolina with his father's family, who settled in Spartanburg District in 1765. He served in the Revolutionary War. He studied law. He was admitted to the bar in 1793 and commenced practice in Spartanburg, South Carolina. He also engaged in agricultural pursuits near Cross Anchor. The 24th lieutenant governor of South Carolina 1810–1812.

Farrow was elected as a Democratic-Republican to the 13th Congress (March 4, 1813 – March 3, 1815). He was not a candidate for renomination in 1814. He resumed the practice of law. He also engaged in agricultural pursuits. He served as member of the State house of representatives 1816–1819 and 1822–1823. He died in Columbia, South Carolina, November 18, 1824. He was interred in the family burial ground on his plantation, near the battlefield of Musgrove Mill, South Carolina.

== Sources ==
- United States Congress. "Samuel Farrow (id: F000036)". Biographical Directory of the United States Congress.

Political offices
Preceded by Frederick Nance	Lieutenant Governor of South Carolina; 1810–1812	Succeeded by Eldred Simkins
U.S. House of Representatives
Preceded by Elias Earle	Member of the U.S. House of Representatives from South Carolina's 8th congressional district 1813–1815	Succeeded by Thomas Moore
