= Mary Simms Oliphant =

American historian

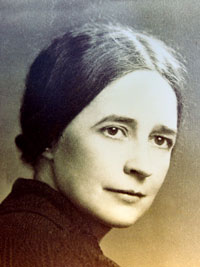
Mary Simms Oliphant, c. 1920

Mary Chevillette Simms Oliphant (January 6, 1891 – July 27, 1988) was a South Carolina historian.

Mary Simms graduated from Columbia College for Women in Columbia, South Carolina. In 1916, the South Carolina state superintendent of education asked her to update the 1860 history of South Carolina written by her grandfather, William Gilmore Simms, for use as a junior high school textbook. The following year, shortly after her marriage to Albert Drane Oliphant (who died in 1935), she finished the book and it was adopted by the state Board of Education. In 1932, Oliphant wrote her own South Carolina history text, The Simms History of South Carolina, which went through nine editions. Her version of The History of South Carolina was used as the framework for information distributed by the South Carolina Educational Television course on South Carolina. Later, in collaboration with her daughter, Mary Simms Oliphant Furman (1918-2013), she produced a reader to introduce third-graders to South Carolina history. Oliphant wrote or edited twenty books, including her most ambitious project: collecting, editing, and publishing six volumes of her grandfather's letters.

From 1927 until 1988, Oliphant owned the Earle Town House, a historic house in Greenville, South Carolina. She also succeeded in having her ancestral home, "Woodlands", in Bamberg County, designated as a National Historic Landmark. Oliphant received honorary degrees from Furman University and the University of South Carolina, was inducted into the South Carolina Hall of Fame in 1982, and was the first woman to receive the Order of the Palmetto. Charles Thomas, a Greenville writer, called her "South Carolina's First Lady of Letters. She typified what we used to think of as a lady...she had a certain dignity that everybody recognized and respected."
