= Whitehall (Greenville, South Carolina) =

Historic house in South Carolina, United States

- U.S. National Register of Historic Places
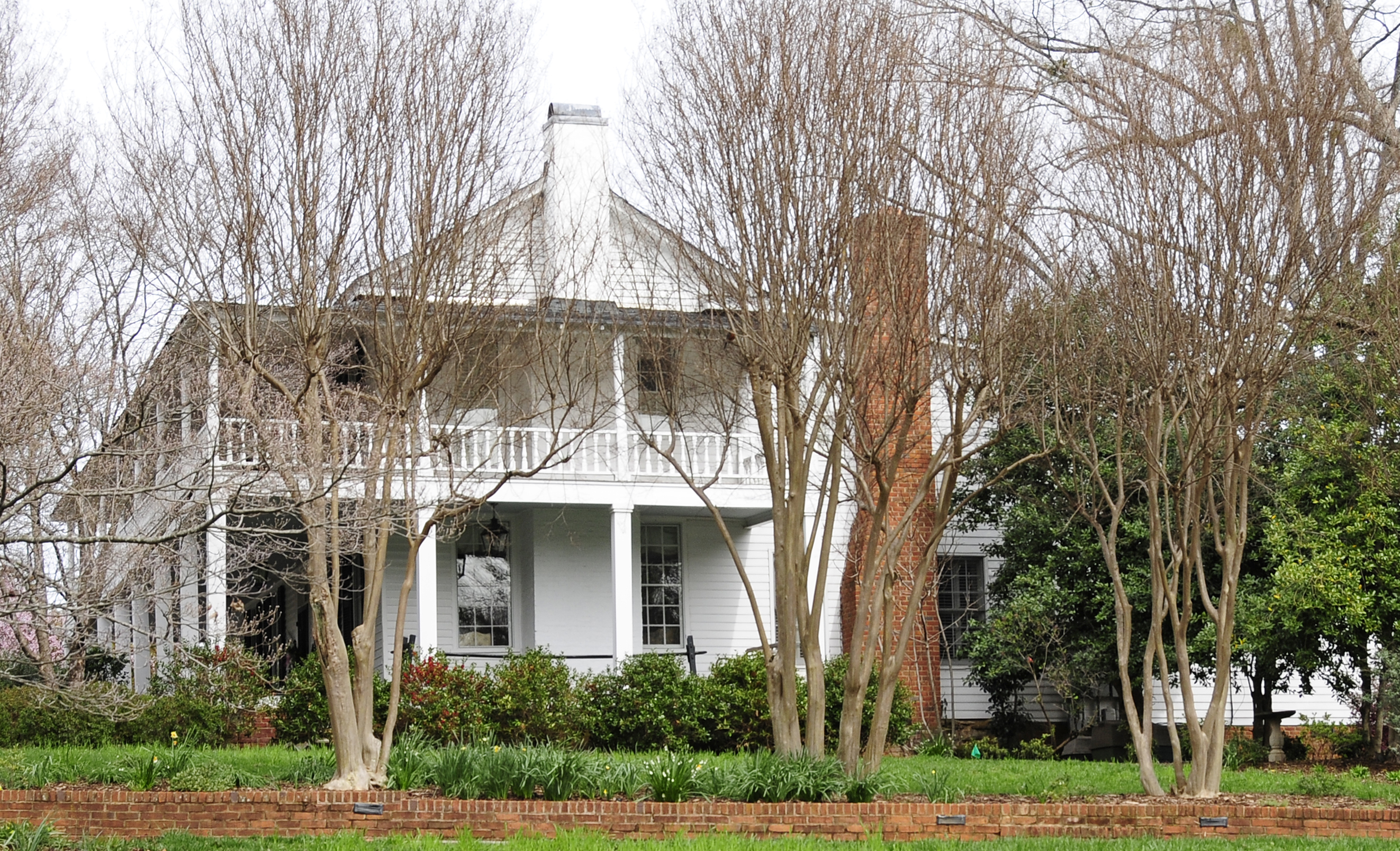
- Whitehall, March 2012

- Location within South Carolina Location within the United States
- Location: 310 W. Earle St., Greenville, South Carolina
- Coordinates: 34°51′50″N 82°24′8″W
- Area: 0 acres (0 ha)
- Built: 1813
- Architectural style: Barbadian
- NRHP reference No.: 69000168
- Added to NRHP: August 5, 1969

Whitehall is a historic home located at Greenville, South Carolina. It was built in 1813 as a summer residence by Charlestonian Henry Middleton on land purchased from Elias Earle. Whitehall served as Middleton's summer home until 1820. It is a simple white frame structure with shuttered windows and wide first and second story galleries, or piazzas, in the Barbadian style.

It was added to the National Register of Historic Places in 1969.
