= John B. Earle =

American politician

John Baylis Earle
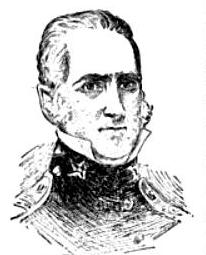

Member of the U.S. House of Representatives from South Carolina's 8th district
- In office March 4, 1803 – March 3, 1805
- Preceded by: District established
- Succeeded by: Elias Earle

Personal details
- Born: October 23, 1766 Mecklenburg County, North Carolina, British America
- Died: February 3, 1836 (aged 69) Anderson County, South Carolina, U.S.
- Party: Democratic-Republican
- Relations: James Thomas Harrison (grandson); James T. Harrison (great-grandson)
- Profession: planter

Military service
- Allegiance: United States of America
- Branch/service: South Carolina militia
- Rank: Adjutant General
- Battles/wars: American Revolutionary War; War of 1812

John Baylis Earle (October 23, 1766 – February 3, 1836) was a U.S. representative from South Carolina from 1803 to 1805. He was a nephew of Elias Earle and cousin of Samuel Earle.

== Biography ==
Born on the North Carolina side of the North Pacolet River, near Landrum, Earle moved to South Carolina. He completed preparatory studies. He served as a drummer boy and soldier during the Revolutionary War in the Rutherford County Regiment. He engaged in agricultural pursuits.

Earle was elected as a Democratic-Republican to the Eighth Congress (March 4, 1803 – March 3, 1805). He was re-elected in 1804, but declined the seat. He resumed agricultural pursuits. He served as adjutant and inspector general of South Carolina for sixteen years. He served throughout the War of 1812. He served as member of the nullification convention of 1832 and 1833. He died in Anderson County, South Carolina, February 3, 1836 and was interred in the cemetery on his plantation, "Silver Glade," in Anderson County.

== Sources ==
- United States Congress. "John B. Earle (id: E000008)". Biographical Directory of the United States Congress.

U.S. House of Representatives
Preceded by District established	Member of the U.S. House of Representatives from South Carolina's 8th congressional district 1803–1805	Succeeded by Elias Earle
