= Elias Earle =

American politician

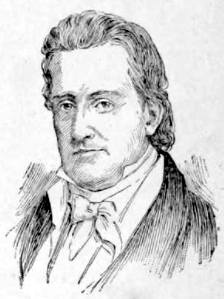

Member of the U.S. House of Representatives from South Carolina
- In office March 4, 1817 – March 3, 1821
- Preceded by: John Taylor
- Succeeded by: John Wilson
- Constituency: 7th district
- In office March 4, 1811 – March 3, 1815
- Preceded by: Lemuel J. Alston
- Succeeded by: John Taylor
- Constituency: 7th district (1813–1815); 8th district (1811–1813)
- In office March 4, 1805 – March 3, 1807
- Preceded by: John B. Earle
- Succeeded by: Lemuel J. Alston
- Constituency: 8th district

Member of the South Carolina Senate
- In office 1800

Member of the South Carolina House of Representatives
- In office 1794–1797

Personal details
- Born: June 19, 1762 Frederick County, Virginia Colony, British America
- Died: May 19, 1822 (aged 59) Centerville, South Carolina, U.S.
- Resting place: Greenville, South Carolina
- Party: Democratic-Republican (1823–1825)
- Other political affiliations: Jacksonian (after 1825)
- Profession: Ironmaster

Elias Earle (June 19, 1762 – May 19, 1823) was a United States representative from South Carolina. Born in Frederick County in the Colony of Virginia, he attended private school and moved to Greenville County, South Carolina, in September 1787. He was one of the earliest ironmasters of the South, and prospected and negotiated in the iron region of Georgia.

Earle was a member of the South Carolina House of Representatives from 1794 to 1797 and was a member of the South Carolina Senate in 1800. He was elected as a Democratic-Republican to the Ninth Congress (March 4, 1805 – March 3, 1807), was elected to the Twelfth and Thirteenth Congresses (March 4, 1811 – March 3, 1815), and was again elected to the Fifteenth and Sixteenth Congresses (March 4, 1817 – March 3, 1821). He died in Centerville, South Carolina, in 1823; interment was in Old Earle Cemetery, Buncombe Road, Greenville, South Carolina.

== Family ==
Elias Earle was the son of Samuel Earle III, member of the Virginia House of Burgesses from 1742 to 1747, (1692 Westmoreland County, Virginia - 1771 Warren County, Virginia) and Elizabeth Holdbrook. Elias was married to Frances Wilton Robinson (March 26, 1762 in Virginia - September 12, 1823) on September 17, 1782 in King George County, Virginia. She was the daughter of Gerard Robinson (1725 - 1770) and Elizabeth Monteith.

Elias Earle's nephews, Samuel Earle and John Baylis Earle, as well as great-grandsons John Laurens Manning Irby and Joseph Haynsworth Earle, were also members of the U.S. Congress.

His home, the Earle Town House, was added to the National Register of Historic Places in 1969. His estate property was developed between about 1915 and 1930, and in 1982 designated the Col. Elias Earle Historic District.

U.S. House of Representatives
Preceded by John B. Earle	Member of the U.S. House of Representatives from South Carolina's 8th congressional district 1805–1807	Succeeded by Lemuel J. Alston
Preceded by Lemuel J. Alston	Member of the U.S. House of Representatives from South Carolina's 8th congressional district 1811–1813	Succeeded by Samuel Farrow
Preceded by Thomas Moore	Member of the U.S. House of Representatives from South Carolina's 7th congressional district 1813–1815	Succeeded by John Taylor
Preceded by John Taylor	Member of the U.S. House of Representatives from South Carolina's 7th congressional district 1817–1821	Succeeded by John Wilson
