= Pinckneyville (Union, South Carolina) =

Archaeological site in South Carolina, United States

- U.S. National Register of Historic Places
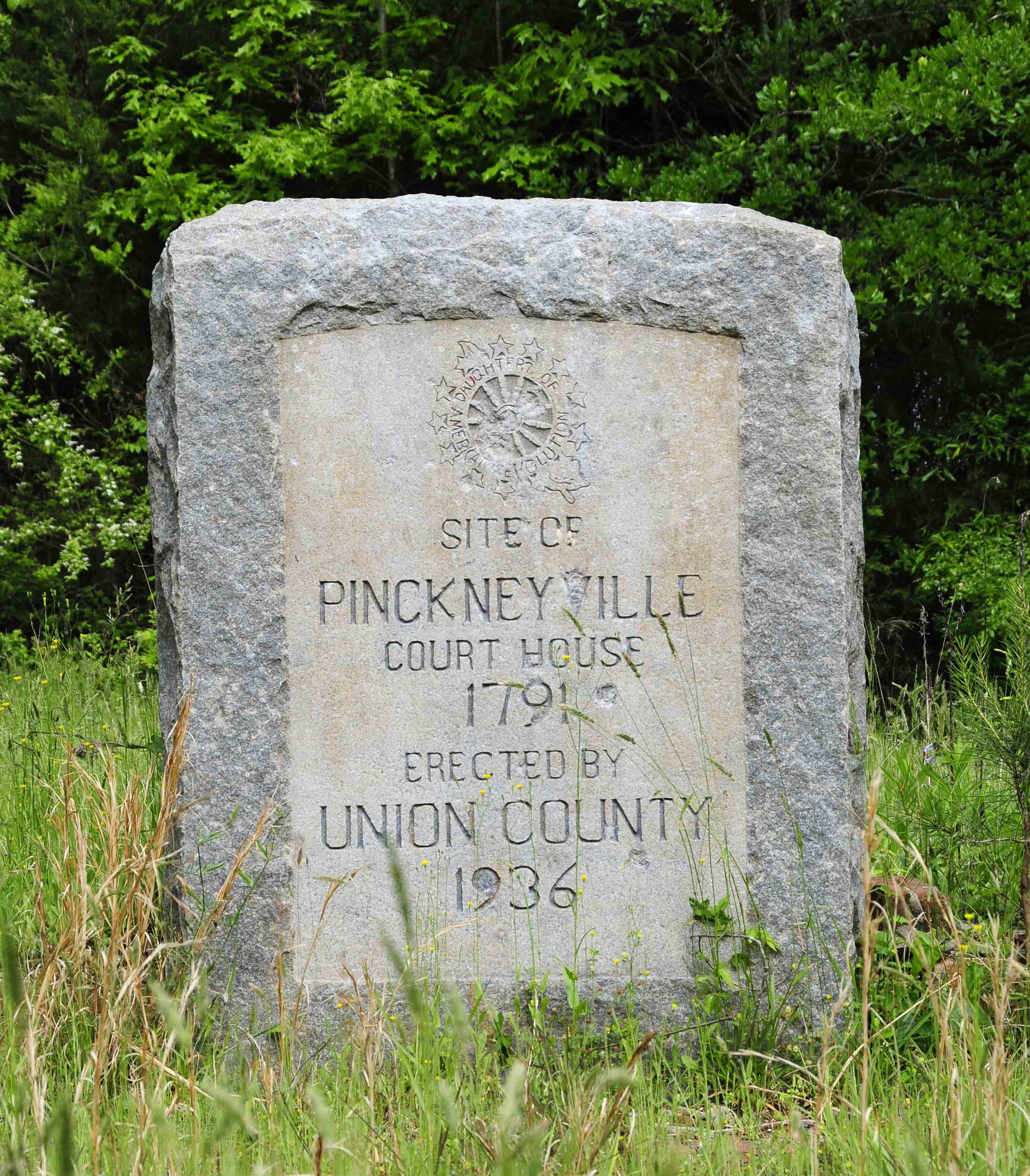
- Pinckneyville Monument, April 2012

- Location within South Carolina Location within the United States
- Location: 13 miles northeast of Union on South Carolina Highway 13, near Union, South Carolina
- Coordinates: 34°30′44″N 81°28′10″W
- Area: 1.8 acres (0.73 ha)
- NRHP reference No.: 69000175
- Added to NRHP: December 3, 1969

Pinckneyville is a historic frontier settlement site located near Union, Union County, South Carolina. Pinckneyville was established on February 19, 1791, by the General Assembly of South Carolina Act #1491 along with the Washington district, and is one of the earliest settlements in the South Carolina backcountry. Pinckneyville was named for Charles Cotesworth Pinckney. Pinckneyville was chosen because it was central to Union County, but Union was the seat of power.

The property includes the original site of Pinckneyville and contains the ruins of the brick structure mistakenly referred to as the jail and one other brick building, usually referred to as the old store.

Pinckneyville lasted until 1850. By 1850 Pinckneyville was replaced by Union on the South Carolina census. It was a combination of the railroad and population growth in the surrounding areas that killed it. Population in the sense that the surrounding areas got their own courts after the General Assembly restructured the court system in 1799. And the railroad because it redirected traffic which starved out the town after the court left. Pinckneyville is currently in Union County, and Union (back then Unionville) is the town the railroad went through. Previously, stagecoach routes directed people to towns and stagecoach routes in the area traveled through the towns with the courts. The stagecoach then ran from Charleston, SC to Philadelphia, PA. The Spartanburg and Union Railroad was planned in 1847 and finished in 1859. By then, Union was the place businesses were moving to.

It was added to the National Register of Historic Places in 1969.
