= William T. Nuckolls =

American politician

William Thompson Nuckolls

Member of the U.S. House of Representatives from South Carolina's 7th district
- In office March 4, 1827 – March 3, 1833
- Preceded by: Joseph Gist
- Succeeded by: William K. Clowney

Personal details
- Born: February 23, 1801 Union County, South Carolina
- Died: September 27, 1855 (aged 54)
- Party: Jacksonian
- Parent: John Nuckolls (Jr.)
- Education: South Carolina College
- Profession: lawyer, planter

William Thompson Nuckolls (February 23, 1801 – September 27, 1855) was a U.S. representative from South Carolina.

William was born near Hancockville, Union (now Cherokee) County, South Carolina. His grandfather, John Nuckolls (Sr.), moved from Virginia to South Carolina around 1770. He was murdered by Tories in 1780, though his son (William's father) survived.

Studying law, William graduated from South Carolina College (now the University of South Carolina) at Columbia in 1820. He was admitted to the bar in 1823 and commenced practice in Spartanburg, South Carolina, befriending John C. Calhoun.

Nuckolls was elected as a Jacksonian to the Twentieth, Twenty-first, and Twenty-second Congresses (March 4, 1827 – March 3, 1833). He died on his plantation near Hancockville, South Carolina, on September 27, 1855. He was interred in Whig Hill Cemetery.

== Sources ==
- United States Congress. "William T. Nuckolls (id: N000167)". Biographical Directory of the United States Congress.

U.S. House of Representatives
| Preceded by Joseph Gist | Member of the U.S. House of Representatives from South Carolina's 7th congressional district 1827–1833 | Succeeded by William K. Clowney |
