= Samuel Earle =

American politician

Member of the U.S. House of Representatives from South Carolina's 6th district
- In office March 4, 1795 – March 3, 1797
- Preceded by: Andrew Pickens
- Succeeded by: William Smith

Member of the South Carolina House of Representatives
- In office 1784–1788

Personal details
- Born: November 28, 1760 Frederick County, Virginia Colony, British America
- Died: November 24, 1833 (aged 72) Pendleton District, South Carolina, U.S.
- Resting place: Beaverdam Cemetery, Oconee County, South Carolina
- Party: Democratic-Republican

Military service
- Allegiance: United States of America
- Years of service: 1777–1782
- Rank: Captain
- Unit: 5th South Carolina Regiment; 1st South Carolina Regiment
- Battles/wars: American Revolutionary War

Samuel Earle (November 28, 1760 – November 24, 1833) was a United States representative from South Carolina. Born in Frederick County in the Colony of Virginia, he moved to the Province of South Carolina in 1774; he participated in the American Revolutionary War, entering the service as an ensign in the 5th South Carolina Regiment in 1777 and leaving as captain of a company of rangers in 1782. He was a member of the South Carolina House of Representatives from 1784 to 1788, and was a delegate to the State convention that ratified the U.S. Constitution on May 12, 1788; he was a delegate to the South Carolina Constitutional Convention in 1790.

Earle was elected as a Republican to the Fourth Congress, serving from March 4, 1795 to March 3, 1797. He died in Pendleton District, South Carolina, on November 24, 1833, four days shy of his 73rd birthday; interment was in Beaverdam Cemetery, Oconee County, South Carolina.

Elias Earle, Samuel's uncle, and John Baylis Earle, his cousin, were also U.S. Representatives from South Carolina.

U.S. House of Representatives
Preceded by Andrew Pickens	Member of the U.S. House of Representatives from South Carolina's 6th congressional district 1795–1797	Succeeded by William Smith
