= Wilson Nesbitt =

American politician

Wilson T. Nesbitt

Member of the U.S. House of Representatives from South Carolina's 8th district
- In office March 4, 1817 – March 3, 1819
- Preceded by: Thomas Moore
- Succeeded by: John McCreary

Member of the South Carolina House of Representatives
- In office 1810–1814

Personal details
- Born: 1781
- Died: May 13, 1861 (aged 79–80) Montgomery, Alabama
- Party: Democratic-Republican
- Occupation: politician, farmer

Wilson T. Nesbitt (1781 – May 13, 1861) was an American politician from South Carolina who served in the United States House of Representatives from 1817 to 1819.

Born in 1781 (his exact date of birth is unknown), Nesbitt resided in Spartanburg, South Carolina where he attended its common schools. Later, he was a student at South Carolina College (now the University of South Carolina) at Columbia, South Carolina in 1805 and 1806. He engaged in agricultural pursuits and conducted an iron foundry.

Nesbitt was a justice of quorum of Spartanburg County, South Carolina in 1810. He served as a member of the South Carolina House of Representatives from 1810 to 1814. He was elected as a Democratic-Republican to the 15th United States Congress, serving from March 4, 1817 to March 3, 1819. After leaving Congress, he moved to Alabama. He died in Montgomery, Alabama in 1861 (shortly after Alabama seceded from the Union and joined the Confederate States of America) and was buried in Oakwood Cemetery.

U.S. House of Representatives
Preceded by Thomas Moore	Member of the U.S. House of Representatives from South Carolina's 8th congressional district 1817–1819	Succeeded by John McCreary
