= Abraham Nott =

American politician

2nd Intendant (Mayor) of Columbia, South Carolina
- In office 1807

Member of the U.S. House of Representatives from South Carolina's 6th district
- In office March 4, 1799 – March 3, 1801
- Preceded by: William Smith
- Succeeded by: Thomas Moore

Member of the South Carolina House of Representatives
- In office 1796–1797

Personal details
- Born: February 5, 1768 Saybrook, Connecticut Colony, British America
- Died: June 19, 1830 (aged 62) Fairfield County, South Carolina, U.S.
- Resting place: Columbia, South Carolina
- Party: Federalist
- Education: Yale College
- Occupation: attorney, judge

Abraham Nott (February 5, 1768 – June 19, 1830) was a United States representative from South Carolina and a slaveholder. Born in Saybrook in the Connecticut Colony, he was educated in early life by a private teacher. He graduated from Yale College in 1787 and in 1788 moved to McIntosh County, Georgia, where he became a private tutor for one year. He moved to Camden, South Carolina, in 1789. He studied law, was admitted to the bar in 1791, beginning to practice in Union, South Carolina. He was a member of South Carolina House of Representatives from 1796 to 1797, and was elected as a Federalist to the Sixth United States Congress, serving from March 4, 1799, to March 3, 1801. After leaving Congress, he resumed practicing law in Columbia in 1804, and was elected a member of the board of trustees of the University of South Carolina in 1805. He was Intendant of Columbia in 1807, and was elected judge of the South Carolina Circuit Court in 1810. He was president of the South Carolina Court of Appeals in 1824 and continued serving as a judge until his death.

Nott died in Fairfield County, South Carolina and is interred in the First Presbyterian Churchyard, Columbia. He was the father of Josiah C. Nott.

U.S. House of Representatives
Preceded by William Smith	Member of the U.S. House of Representatives from South Carolina's 6th congressional district 1799–1801	Succeeded by Thomas Moore
