= Thomas Earl House (Napa, California) =

- U.S. National Register of Historic Places
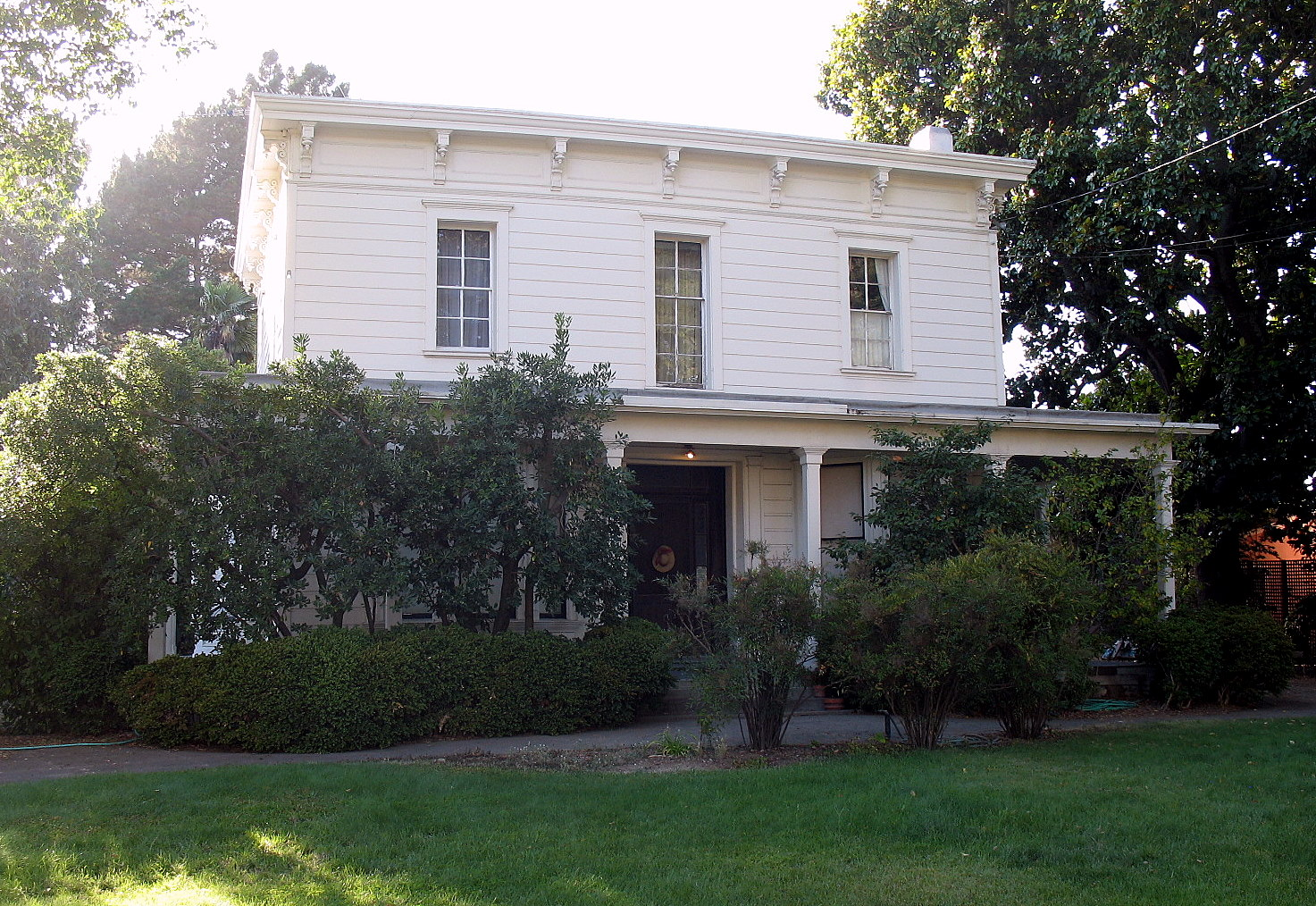

- Location within California
- Location: 1221 Seminary St., Napa, California
- Coordinates: 38°17′58″N 122°17′24″W
- Area: less than one acre
- Built: 1861
- Architectural style: Italianate
- NRHP reference No.: 92000996
- Added to NRHP: August 18, 1992

The Thomas Earl House, at 1221 Seminary St. in Napa, California, is an Italianate style house which was built in 1861. It was listed on the National Register of Historic Places in 1992.

It is significant for its association with Thomas Earl (1825-1893), a leading citizen in Napa for four decades.

The 2014 South Napa earthquake caused severe damage to the house, which was built with "21-inch-thick walls using an early form of concrete that lacked the strength of modern Portland cement". American businessman and investor Marc Porat and his wife Claire Tomkins purchased the damaged house in 2017, planning to convert it into a ten-room retreat center for use by corporations. Their original plan was to move the house 12 feet (3.7 m) east and renovate it, and that concept was approved by Napa's cultural heritage commission, planning commission and city council early on 2020. Experts later concluded that moving the house all at once could result in destruction of the historic structure. Working with architect Tim Deming, the owners developed an alternative plan to cut the external walls into sections for removal, restoration and reassembly on a new steel frame set on a new foundation over a newly excavated basement, a process called "panelization". Although city staff expressed concern about the process, the cultural heritage commission approved the plan in December, 2020. Porat promised that the "end product will be identical".
