= Thomas Earl House (Ann Arbor, Michigan) =

- U.S. National Register of Historic Places
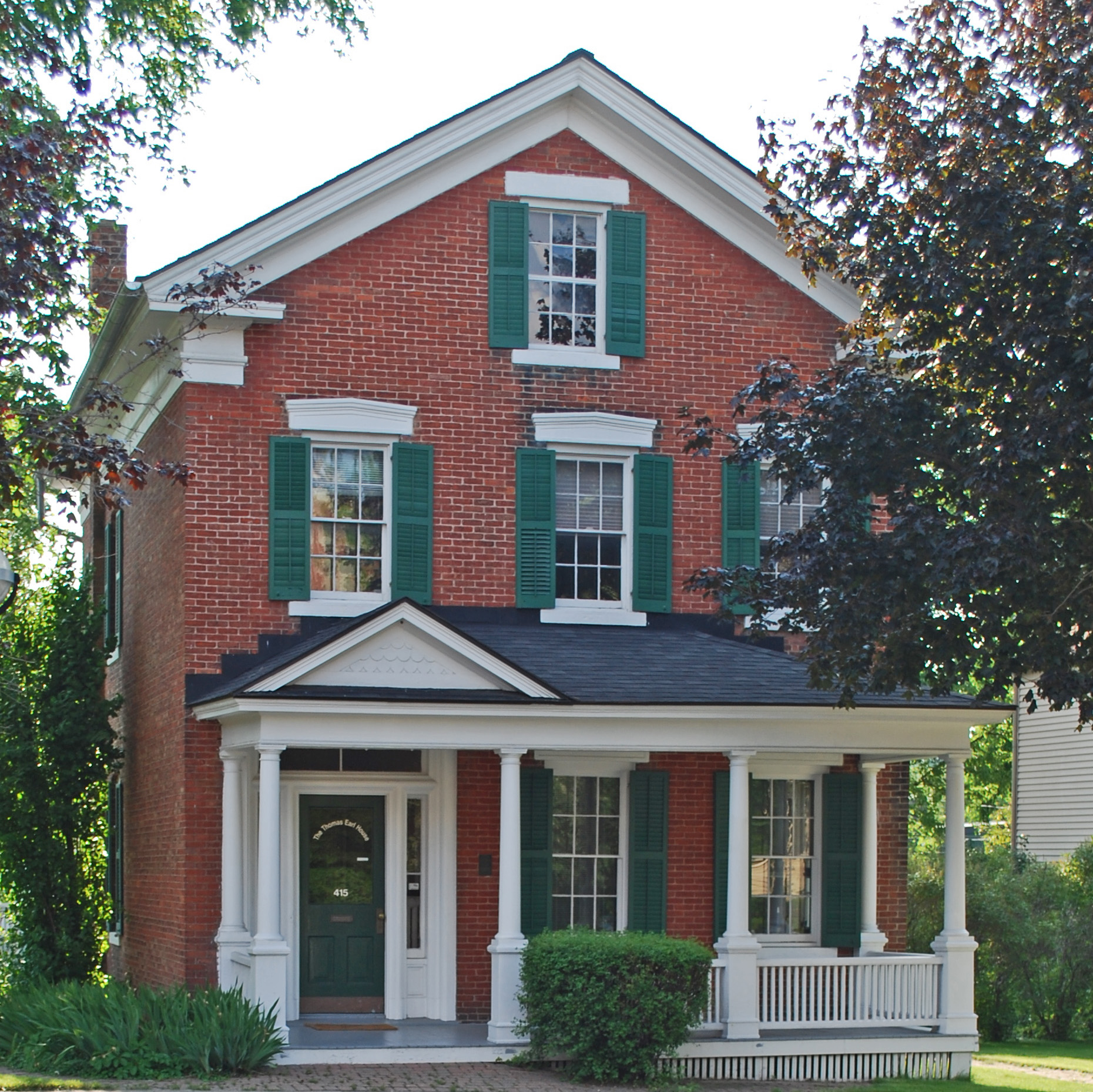

- Location within Michigan Location within the United States
- Interactive map showing the location for Thomas Earl House
- Location: 415 N. Main St., Ann Arbor, Michigan
- Coordinates: 42°17′03″N 83°44′55″W
- Area: less than one acre
- Built: 1860
- Architectural style: Greek Revival
- NRHP reference No.: 91002000
- Added to NRHP: June 25, 1992

The Thomas Earl House was built as a single-family home located at 415 North Main Street in Ann Arbor, Michigan. It was listed on the National Register of Historic Places in 1992. The house has been renovated to office space.

== History ==
Thomas Earl was born in Ireland in 1810, emigrated to Canada in 1829, and finally arrived in the Ann Arbor area in 1833. He purchased 200 acres of land and began farming, and married Mary Ann Duncan, the sister of a neighbor, in 1834. In 1849 the Earls moved to Ann Arbor and entered the grocery business, living above the store on Main Street. In 1857 they bought the lot this house now stands on, and began building this house in about 1860.

Thomas Earl continued to operate his store, and live in this house, until his death in 1882. Mary Duncan Earl lived in the house until her own death in 1899. She left the property to the Thomas Catholic Church. In 1900, Fred Schaible bought the house at auction in 1900, and in 1910 he renovated the structure. The house was left to Schaible's daughter, Lucille, who married Harry Schmid. The Schmids lived in the house until the late 1980s. In 1990, Peter Fink purchased the house and renovated it for office use.

== Description ==
The Thomas Early House is a 2-1/2 story brick side-hall plan Greek Revival gable-fronted house with a single story shed-roofed clapboard addition in the rear, and a later single story flat-roofed aluminum-sided addition behind that. The main section is constructed of well-crafted brick, where the bricks are of an unusually small size, with a light colored mortar dividing them. The facade has distinctive and varied Greek Revival details, with deep cornice returns and an entry with rectangular transom and sidelights. The windows are six-over-six double-hung sash units with shutters. The lintels on the first and second floors are of cut stone, painted white and shaped to match the window and door surrounds. A single story hipped roof wooden front porch, likely constructed in the early 20th century, extends across the front of the house.
