= Centerville, South Carolina =

Centerville
- CDP
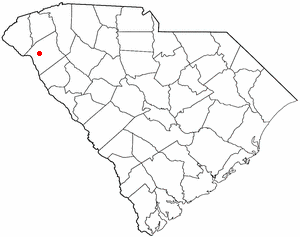
- Location of Centerville, South Carolina
- Coordinates: 34°31′21″N 82°42′53″W
- Country: United States
- State: South Carolina
- County: Anderson

Area
  - Total: 5.93 sq mi (15.37 km^{2})
  - Land: 5.90 sq mi (15.29 km^{2})
  - Water: 0.031 sq mi (0.08 km^{2})
- Elevation: 833 ft (254 m)

Population (2020)
  - Total: 7,185
  - Density: 1,216.8/sq mi (469.82/km^{2})
- Time zone: UTC-5 (Eastern (EST))
  - Summer (DST): UTC-4 (EDT)
- ZIP code: 29625
- Area codes: 864, 821
- FIPS code: 45-12965
- GNIS feature ID: 2402755

Centerville is a census-designated place (CDP) in Anderson County, South Carolina. The population was 7,185 at the 2020 census.

== Geography ==
Centerville is a suburban area in central Anderson County west of Anderson, the county seat. Interstate 85, the primary highway through Upstate South Carolina, is 4 miles (6 km) to the north at Exit 19. Lake Hartwell is 2 miles (3 km) to the west.

According to the United States Census Bureau, the CDP has a total area of 5.9 square miles (15.4 km^{2}), of which 5.9 square miles (15.3 km^{2}) is land and 0.039 square miles (0.1 km^{2}), or 0.52%, is water.

== Demographics ==
Historical population
Census	Pop.	Note	%±
2000	5,181		—
2010	6,586		27.1%
2020	7,185		9.1%
U.S. Decennial Census

=== 2020 census ===
Centerville racial composition
Race	Num.	Perc.
White (non-Hispanic)	5,326	74.13%
Black or African American (non-Hispanic)	1,250	17.4%
Native American	15	0.21%
Asian	79	1.1%
Pacific Islander	2	0.03%
Other/Mixed	288	4.01%
Hispanic or Latino	225	3.13%

As of the 2020 United States census, there were 7,185 people, 2,990 households, and 1,870 families residing in the CDP.

=== 2000 census ===
As of the census of 2000, there were 5,181 people, 2,057 households, and 1,561 families residing in the CDP. The population density was 881.3 inhabitants per square mile (340.3/km^{2}). There were 2,188 housing units at an average density of 372.2 per square mile (143.7/km^{2}). The racial makeup of the CDP was 90.48% White, 7.43% African American, 0.08% Native American, 1.08% Asian, 0.02% Pacific Islander, 0.35% from other races, and 0.56% from two or more races. Hispanic or Latino of any race were 1.00% of the population.

There were 2,057 households, out of which 32.6% had children under the age of 18 living with them, 63.0% were married couples living together, 9.4% had a female householder with no husband present, and 24.1% were non-families. 20.5% of all households were made up of individuals, and 6.6% had someone living alone who was 65 years of age or older. The average household size was 2.52 and the average family size was 2.92.

In the CDP, the population was spread out, with 24.1% under the age of 18, 8.0% from 18 to 24, 29.3% from 25 to 44, 26.0% from 45 to 64, and 12.6% who were 65 years of age or older. The median age was 37 years. For every 100 females, there were 93.3 males. For every 100 females age 18 and over, there were 91.9 males.

The median income for a household in the CDP was $43,764, and the median income for a family was $50,496. Males had a median income of $36,358 versus $25,208 for females. The per capita income for the CDP was $21,534. About 6.1% of families and 8.4% of the population were below the poverty line, including 12.6% of those under age 18 and 3.7% of those age 65 or over.
