= Col. Elias Earle Historic District =

Historic district in South Carolina, United States

- U.S. National Register of Historic Places
- U.S. Historic district
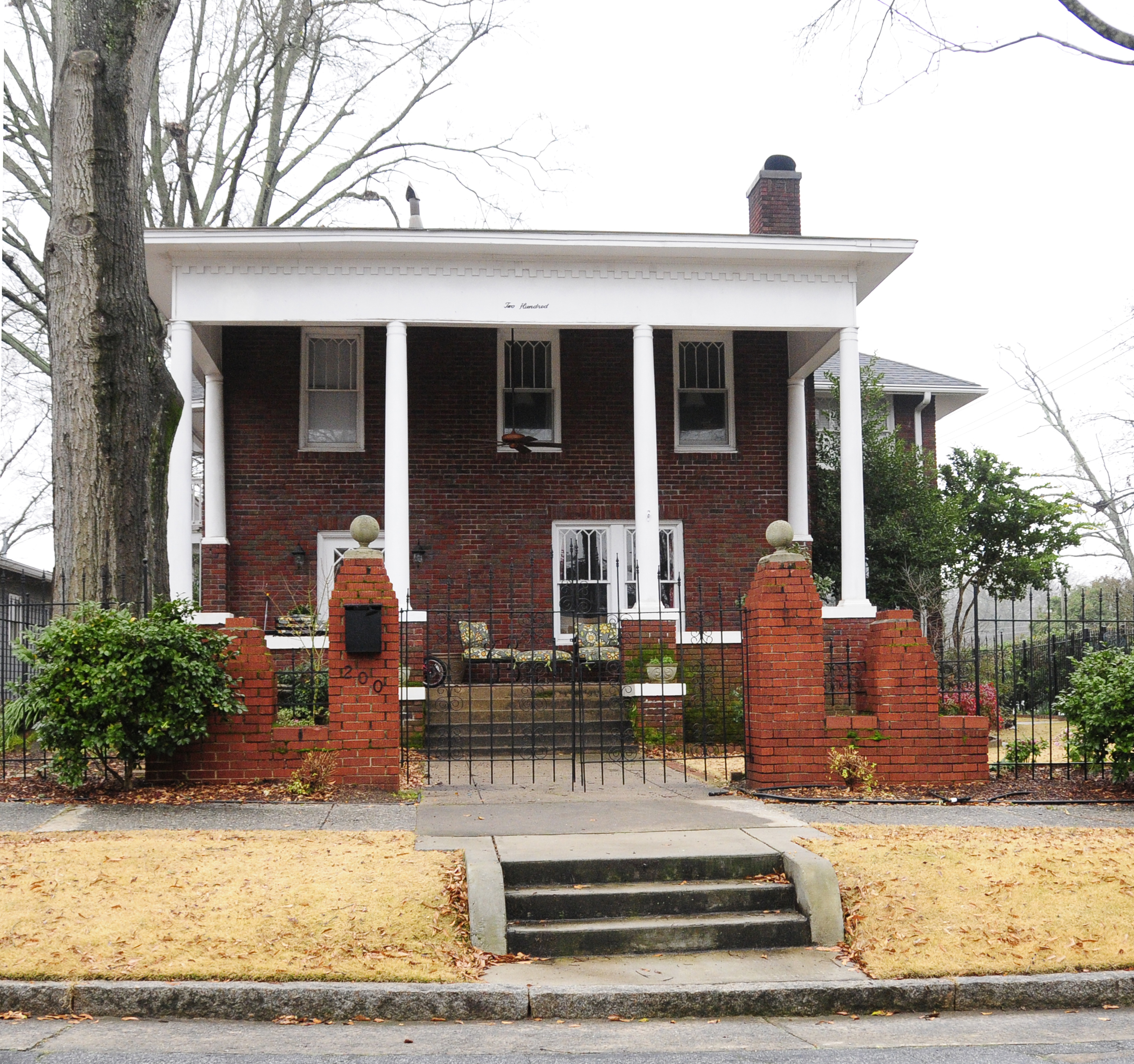
- Col. Elias Earle Historic District, February 2012

- Location within South Carolina Location within the United States
- Location: Earle, James, N. Main, and Rutherford Sts., Greenville, South Carolina
- Coordinates: 34°51′47″N 82°24′06″W
- Area: 46 acres (19 ha)
- Built: 1915
- Architectural style: Colonial Revival, Bungalow/craftsman, Tudor Revival
- MPS: Greenville MRA
- NRHP reference No.: 82003856
- Added to NRHP: July 1, 1982

Col. Elias Earle Historic District is a national historic district located at Greenville, South Carolina. It encompasses 74 contributing buildings in a middle-class neighborhood of Greenville. The houses primarily date from about 1915 to 1930, and include Neoclassical, Colonial Revival, Tudor Revival, and bungalow styles. The district was originally part of the estate of Colonel Elias Earle, a prominent early-19th century Greenville citizen. The Earle St. Baptist Church is located in the district.

It was added to the National Register of Historic Places in 1982.
