= National Register of Historic Places listings in Greenville, South Carolina =

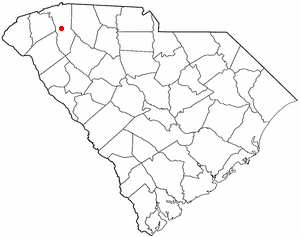
Location of Greenville in South Carolina

This is a list of the National Register of Historic Places listings in Greenville, South Carolina.

This is intended to be a complete list of the properties and districts on the National Register of Historic Places in Greenville, South Carolina, United States. The locations of National Register properties and districts for which the latitude and longitude coordinates are included below, may be seen in a map.

There are 95 properties and districts listed on the National Register in Greenville County. The city of Greenville is the location of 48 of these properties and districts; they are listed here, while the properties and districts in the remaining parts of the county are listed separately. Another four properties in Greenville were once listed but have been removed.

This National Park Service list is complete through NPS recent listings posted May 1, 2026.

== Current listings ==
	Name on the Register	Image	Date listed	Location	City or town	Description
1	Hugh Aiken House	Hugh Aiken House	April 11, 2003 (#03000207)	1 Parkside Dr. 34°52′36″N 82°23′26″W		
2	Allen Temple A.M.E. Church	Allen Temple A.M.E. Church	April 16, 2010 (#08000748)	109 Green Ave. at junction with S. Markley St. 34°50′30″N 82°24′33″W		Allen Temple Church (A.M.E) was founded in 1876, during the Reconstruction Era, and was the only church during that time period where slaves could worship freely. Rutherford B. Hayes traveled to South Carolina and delivered a speech at Allen Temple Church in hopes that he’d win the votes of African Americans. Other presidential candidates have given speeches at Allen Temple, including President Barack Obama
3	American Cigar Factory	American Cigar Factory	July 1, 1982 (#82003853)	E. Ct. St. 34°50′54″N 82°23′56″W		The American cigar factory was built in 1902 by James B. Duke to make cigars for the southern states. When the factory was built they hired 150 women to work there. The building is now used as an east coast office for Hitachi Solutions America, Ltd.
4	Fountain Fox Beattie House	Fountain Fox Beattie House	October 9, 1974 (#74001859)	N. Church St. 34°51′10″N 82°23′40″W		
5	Beth Israel Synagogue	Beth Israel Synagogue	May 23, 2016 (#16000292)	307 Townes St. 34°51′29″N 82°23′52″W		Old Beth Israel synagogue, built 1929-30.
6	Borden Ice Cream Factory		October 13, 2023 (#100009444)	711 West Washington St. 34°51′18″N 82°24′33″W		
7	Broad Margin	Broad Margin	December 8, 1978 (#78002513)	9 W. Avondale Dr. 34°52′23″N 82°23′26″W		
8	Brushy Creek		October 6, 1999 (#99000102)	327 Rice St. 34°48′35″N 82°23′30″W		
9	Carolina Supply Company	Carolina Supply Company	July 3, 1997 (#97000743)	35 W. Court St. 34°50′55″N 82°24′05″W		The Carolina Supply Company was built by J.E. Sirrine to supply mills with equipment and manufactured goods. The company is built in a utilitarian renaissance revival design. The building now houses Wells Fargo Bank.
10	Chamber of Commerce Building	Chamber of Commerce Building	July 1, 1982 (#82003854)	130 S. Main St. 34°50′53″N 82°24′00″W		The chamber of commerce building was built in 1925; it is one of the first skyscrapers built in Greenville.
11	Christ Church (Episcopal) and Churchyard	Christ Church (Episcopal) and Churchyard	May 6, 1971 (#71000784)	10 N. Church St. 34°51′03″N 82°23′40″W		Christ Church was founded by Reverend Rodolphus Dickerson, who established the St. James Mission in Greenville. The planning for the Episcopalian church was done by Joel Pansett, and the first Cornerstone was laid on September 15, 1825. The property includes a large cemetery, with gravestones dating back to the late 1700s and 1800s.
12	Davenport Apartments	Davenport Apartments	July 1, 1982 (#82003855)	400-402 E. Washington St. 34°50′57″N 82°23′44″W		The Davenport apartments were built in 1914 by G.D. Davenport. This was the first apartment building in the city. Today the company Love Thornton and Arnold Thompson own some apartments in this building.
13	T.Q. Donaldson House	T.Q. Donaldson House	September 4, 1980 (#80003671)	412 Crescent Ave. 34°49′54″N 82°23′43″W		The T.Q. Donaldson House was built by William Williams for Thomas Q. Donaldson, a lawyer and member of the South Carolina Senate from Greenville County from 1872-1876. The house was originally built as a 1 1/2-story house; soon after the original construction, a second story was added.
14	Downtown Baptist Church	Downtown Baptist Church	August 16, 1977 (#77001225)	101 W. McBee Ave. 34°51′09″N 82°24′09″W		In 1854, the First Baptist Church formed a building committee to construct a new church. The congregation hired Samuel Sloan as an architect, and the Downtown Baptist Church was built in 1858. The church is a Greek revival structure.
15	Earle Town House	Earle Town House	August 5, 1969 (#69000167)	107 James St. 34°51′49″N 82°24′24″W		The house, once believed to have been built by Congressman Elias T. Earle, is more likely to have been built c. 1829-1834. It was later owned by Charles A. David (1853–1934), a local humorist and cartoonist, and then by author Mary Simms Oliphant, who extensively renovated the structure.
16	Col. Elias Earle Historic District	Col. Elias Earle Historic District	July 1, 1982 (#82003856)	Earle, James, N. Main, and Rutherford Sts. 34°51′47″N 82°24′06″W		
17	East Park Historic District	East Park Historic District	October 4, 2005 (#05001157)	Roughly bounded by East Park Ave., Bennett St., Harcourt Dr., and Rowley St. 34°51′30″N 82°23′30″W		
18	First National Bank	First National Bank	December 21, 1989 (#89002152)	102 S. Main St. 34°50′57″N 82°24′40″W		The First National Bank was the first bank in South Carolina. The First National Bank built in 1938, and enlarged in 1952.
19	Gilfillin and Houston Building	Gilfillin and Houston Building	June 9, 2004 (#04000589)	217-219 E. Washington St. 34°51′00″N 82°23′48″W		
20	Greenville County Courthouse	Greenville County Courthouse	April 7, 1994 (#94000300)	130 S. Main St. 34°50′55″N 82°24′02″W		The Greenville County Courthouse was built in 1918 by Phillip Thornton Marye. It is a Beaux Arts structure clad with terra cotta.
21	Greenville Elks Lodge	Greenville Elks Lodge	October 5, 2015 (#15000707)	18 E. North St. 34°51′08″N 82°23′51″W		
22	Greenville Gas and Electric Light Company	Greenville Gas and Electric Light Company	July 1, 1982 (#82003857)	211 E. Broad St. 34°50′47″N 82°23′47″W		
23	Hampton-Pinckney Historic District	Hampton-Pinckney Historic District	December 12, 1977 (#77001226)	Hampton Ave. and Pinckney St. between Butler Ave. and Lloyd St.; also Hampton, Lloyd, and Hudson Sts. and Butler and Asbury Aves. 34°51′22″N 82°24′21″W		Second set of boundaries represents a boundary increase of July 1, 1982
24	Imperial Hotel	Imperial Hotel	September 12, 1985 (#85002167)	201 W. Washington St. 34°51′05″N 82°24′07″W		The Imperial Hotel was the first known hotel in Greenville. It was built by Joseph G. Cunningham and Frank Harrison. This establishment is still used as a nursing home for disabled people 55 and over.
25	Isaqueena	Isaqueena	July 1, 1982 (#82003859)	106 DuPont Dr. 34°51′45″N 82°22′24″W		Also known as the Gassaway Mansion, the forty-room house (built 1919-24) is a blend of Neo-Gothic and Neo-Classical elements.
26	Josiah Kilgore House	Josiah Kilgore House	April 28, 1975 (#75001699)	N. Church and Academy Sts. 34°51′18″N 82°23′31″W		
27	Lanneau-Norwood House	Lanneau-Norwood House	July 1, 1982 (#82003860)	417 Belmont Ave. 34°49′58″N 82°23′34″W		
28	McBride's Office Supply		September 16, 2024 (#100010864)	832 Wade Hampton Blvd; 34°52′10″N 82°22′31″W		
29	Mills Mill	Mills Mill	July 1, 1982 (#82003861)	Mills and Guess Sts. 34°49′40″N 82°24′38″W		Mills Mill was built by Otis Prentiss Mills to make textiles such as fine cotton sheeting, twills, and satins. In the 2000s the mill was repurposed into condominiums.
30	E. W. Montgomery Cotton Warehouse	E. W. Montgomery Cotton Warehouse	June 27, 2012 (#12000371)	806 Green Ave. 34°50′15″N 82°24′44″W		The E. W. Montgomery Cotton Warehouse was built in the late 1920s and 1930s by Edmund Warren Montgomery. The Cotton Warehouse closed in 1933, and was transformed into apartments in the 1980s.
31	Parker High School Auditorium	Parker High School Auditorium	February 26, 1996 (#96000144)	900 Woodside Ave. 34°51′33″N 82°24′56″W		
32	Pettigru Street Historic District	Pettigru Street Historic District	July 1, 1982 (#82003862)	Pettigru, Whitsett, Williams, Manly, E. Washington, Broadus, Toy, and Boyce Sts. 34°51′00″N 82°23′23″W		The Pettigru Street Historic District, located just to the east of downtown Greenville, was built between 1890 and 1930, with the majority of construction from 1910 to 1930. The district was originally created to serve as an estate for successful figures of wealth, such as businessmen and mill owners. Famous for its old English architectural styles, such as the Bungalow, Queen Anne, and Victorian homes, along with the beautiful trees lined along the road, this region is a common attraction for potential homeowners or visitors.
33	Poe Hardware and Supply Company	Poe Hardware and Supply Company	May 14, 2021 (#100006507)	556 Perry Ave. 34°50′54″N 82°25′41″W		
34	Poinsett Hotel	Poinsett Hotel	July 1, 1982 (#82003863)	120 S. Main St. 34°50′55″N 82°24′02″W		The Westin Poinsett Hotel, named for Joel R. Poinsett (Secretary of War under Millard Fillmore), was one of the first skyscrapers to be built in Greenville. It was designed by New York architect William Lee Stoddart and built by the J. E. Sirrine Company of Greenville for $1.5 million dollars. The Poinsett opened on June 20, 1925.
35	Reedy River Falls Historic Park and Greenway	Reedy River Falls Historic Park and Greenway	April 23, 1973 (#73001711)	Both banks of the Reedy River from the falls to Church St.; also roughly bounded by S. Main and Church Sts. and Camperdown Way; 34°50′40″N 82°24′04″W		In the 1770s, Richard Pearis, a Virginian Indian trader, settled at the falls of the Reedy River with his family and twelve slaves. Pearis built a grist mill, sawmill, a home, a store stocked with Indian goods, smokehouse, stables, and blacksmith shop and slave quarters. After being owned by some other families, the property was sold to Vardry McBee in 1815. He began the development of the town of Pleasantburg, which in 1831 changed its name to Greenville.
36	Reedy River Industrial District	Reedy River Industrial District	February 14, 1979 (#79002383)	Along the Reedy River between River St. and Camperdown Way; 34°50′48″N 82°24′06″W		
37	Richland Cemetery	Richland Cemetery	October 4, 2005 (#05001155)	Hilly St. and Sunflower St. 34°51′19″N 82°23′41″W		The Richland Cemetery was built due to the idea of Ana Butler. She decided that the area was a perfect place to hold a grave yard. She placed it in the center of an African American community. Also many famous Africans Americans are laid to rest here which is one reason why this is such a historical site.
38	St. Andrew's Episcopal Church		May 19, 2025 (#100011873)	1002 S. Main Street; 34°50′35″N 82°24′35″W		
39	Springwood Cemetery	Springwood Cemetery	October 4, 2005 (#05001156)	Main St. and Elford St. 34°51′17″N 82°23′35″W		Springwood cemetery is the final resting ground for some of Greenville’s greatest names. Springwood was once a garden to the Thompson family, and was where Elizabeth Williams Thompson requested to be buried. With its 10,000 plus graves, it is still known for its beauty.
40	Stradley and Barr Dry Goods Store	Stradley and Barr Dry Goods Store	June 24, 2008 (#07000099)	14 S. Main St. 34°51′02″N 82°23′57″W		
41	Triangle Building	Triangle Building	January 13, 2022 (#100007305)	1203-1211 Pendleton St. 34°50′48″N 82°25′40″W		
42	U.S. Post Office and Courthouse	U.S. Post Office and Courthouse	June 9, 2014 (#14000300)	300 E. Washington St. 34°50′58″N 82°23′46″W		
43	John Wesley Methodist Episcopal Church	John Wesley Methodist Episcopal Church	January 20, 1978 (#78002514)	101 E. Court St. 34°50′52″N 82°23′55″W		
44	West End Commercial Historic District	West End Commercial Historic District	January 7, 1993 (#92001751)	Roughly the junction of Pendleton, River, Augusta, and S. Main Sts. and east along Main to Camperdown Way; also 631 S. Main St. 34°50′40″N 82°24′16″W		631 S. Main represents a boundary increase of May 29, 1998
45	Whitehall	Whitehall	August 5, 1969 (#69000168)	310 W. Earle St. 34°51′50″N 82°24′08″W		Whitehall is one of Greenville’s oldest residences. It was built by Henry Middleton in 1813 and served as Middleton’s summer home until 1820. Middleton’s father, Arthur Middleton was a signer of the Declaration of Independence, president of Continental Congress, a US Senator, and a member of the SC House of Representatives. In 1820 Whitehall was sold to George Washington Earle, son of Elias T. Earle.
46	William and Harriet Wilkins House	William and Harriet Wilkins House	July 19, 2016 (#16000463)	105 Mills Ave. 34°49′51″N 82°24′22″W		
47	Working Benevolent Temple and Professional Building	Working Benevolent Temple and Professional Building	July 1, 1982 (#82003865)	Broad and Falls Sts. 34°50′50″N 82°23′56″W		
48	C. Granville Wyche House	C. Granville Wyche House	September 2, 1993 (#93000904)	2900 Augusta Rd. 34°48′46″N 82°23′03″W		

== Former listings ==
	Name on the Register	Image	Date listed	Date removed	Location	City or town	Description
1	Cherrydale	Cherrydale	June 17, 1976 (#76001702)	December 8, 2005	1500 Poinsett Highway		Moved to Furman University
2	Greenville City Hall	Greenville City Hall	August 19, 1971 (#71001067)	October 12, 1973	Main and Broad Streets		Demolished in May 1973
3	Old Textile Hall	Old Textile Hall	November 25, 1980 (#80003672)	March 15, 2000	322 West Washington Street		Demolished in 1992
4	Williams-Earle House		July 1, 1982 (#82003864)	July 23, 2013	319 Grove Rd. 34°49′31″N 82°24′19″W		Delisted after being relocated closer to Grove Road

== See also ==
- List of National Historic Landmarks in South Carolina
- National Register of Historic Places listings in South Carolina
