= Aiken House =

Aiken House may refer to:

- Fred C. Aiken House, listed on the National Register of Historic Places (NRHP) in Boca Raton, Florida
- David Aikens House, listed on the NRHP in Columbus, Indiana
- Aiken House (Rensselaer, New York), listed on the NRHP in Rensselaer County, New York
- Abraham Aiken House, listed on the NRHP in Willsboro, New York
- Gov. William Aiken House, listed on the NRHP in Charleston, South Carolina
- Hugh Aiken House, listed on the NRHP in Greenville, South Carolina
- William Aiken House and Associated Railroad Structures, listed on the NRHP in Charleston, South Carolina
- White-Aiken House, listed on the NRHP in Salado, Texas
