= Cherrydale (disambiguation) =

Cherrydale may refer to:

- Cherrydale, Arlington County, Virginia, a neighborhood
  - Cherrydale Volunteer Fire House
- Cherrydale (Turkey, North Carolina), a NRHP-listed house
- Cherrydale (Greenville, South Carolina), a historic house
