= Old Beth Israel Synagogue (Greenville, South Carolina) =

Beth Israel Synagogue (former)
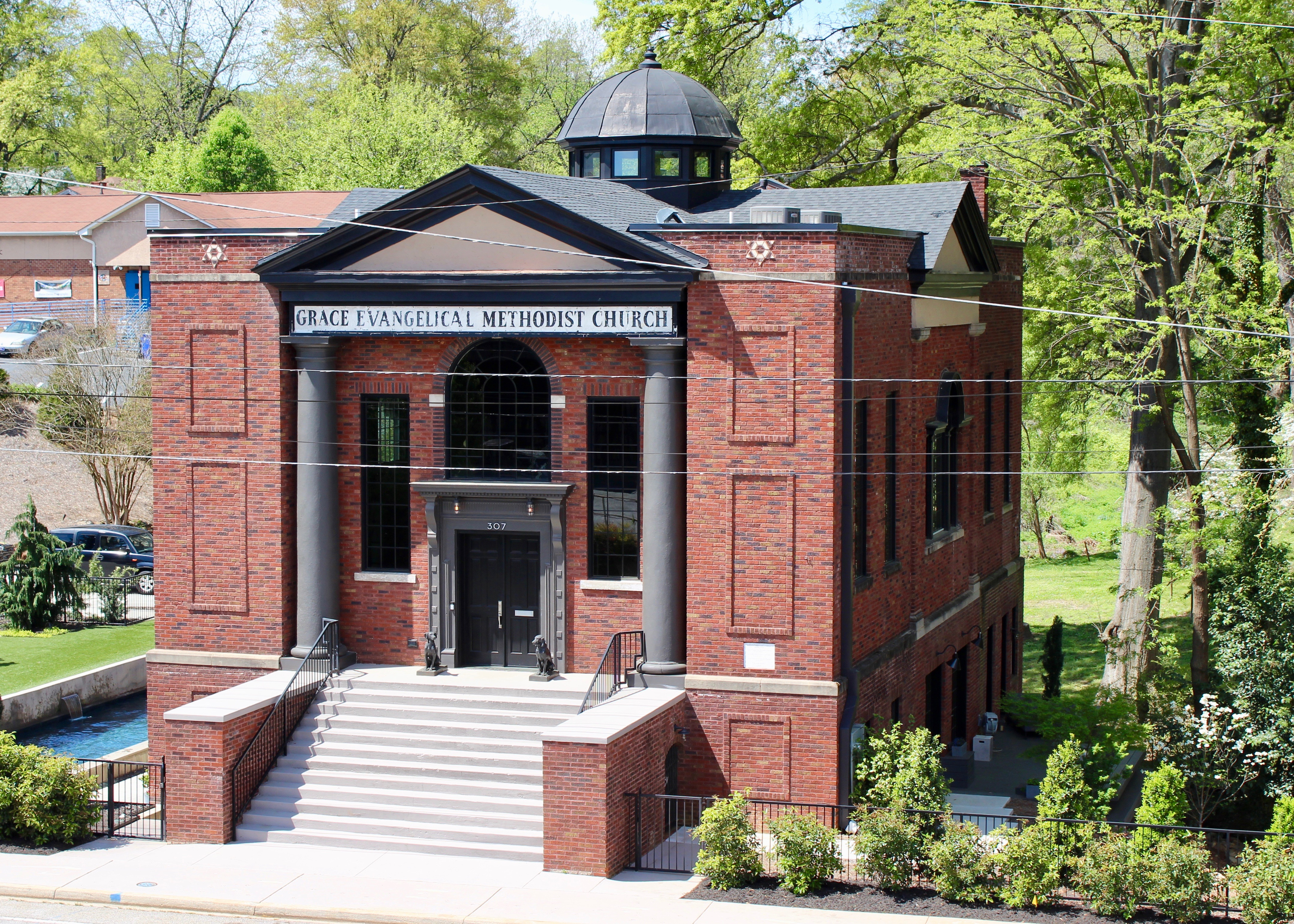
- Former Beth Israel Synagogue in 2020 after being repurposed as a private residence.

- Location in South Carolina

Religion
- Affiliation: Orthodox Judaism (1930 – 1957); Christianity (1959 – 1988)
- Ecclesiastical or organizational status: Synagogue (1930 – 1957); Church (1959 – 1988)
- Status: Closed and deconsecrated; Commercial (1988 – 2004); Residential (since 2015)

Location
- Location: 307 Townes Street, Greenville, South Carolina
- Country: United States
- Interactive map of Beth Israel Synagogue (former)
- Coordinates: 34°51′29″N 82°23′52″W

Architecture
- Architect: Joseph G. Cunningham
- Type: Synagogue
- Style: Classical Revival
- Established: 1910 (Jewish congregation)
- Completed: 1930
- Materials: Brick; stone trim
- Beth Israel Synagogue
- U.S. National Register of Historic Places
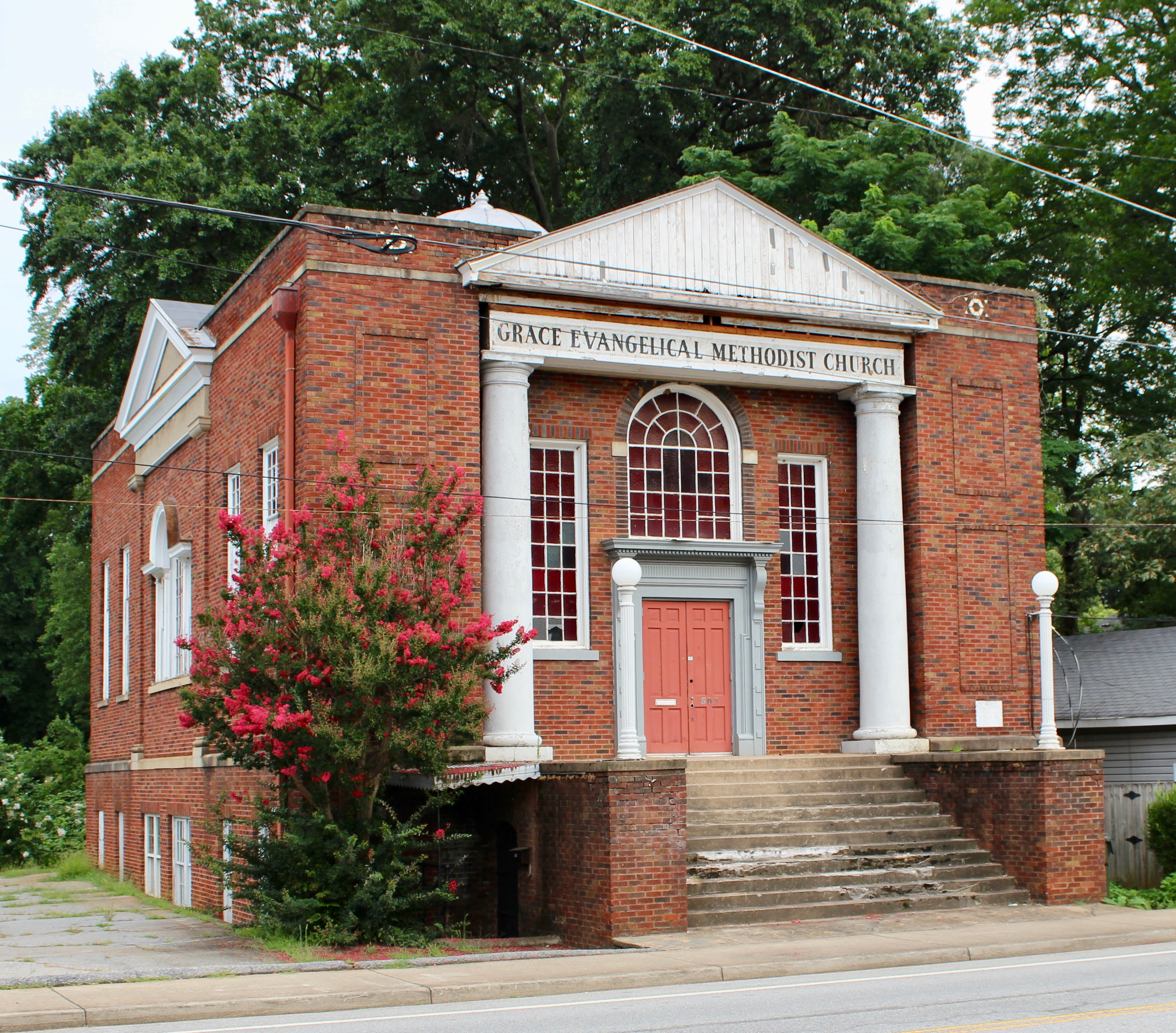
- The former synagogue, in 2015
- Area: less than one acre
- NRHP reference No.: 16000292
- Added to NRHP: May 23, 2016

The Old Beth Israel Synagogue is a former Orthodox Jewish synagogue located at 307 Townes Street in the Stone Avenue neighborhood of Greenville, South Carolina, in the United States.

The historical former synagogue building, after being repurposed as a church and later commercial building, is now used as a private residence.

== Description ==
The historic building is a single-story Classical Revival brick building with stone trim. It was the first Orthodox Jewish synagogue in Greenville, and was designed by Joseph Cunningham, a local architect, and built in 1929-30 for a congregation founded in 1910. The congregation moved to a larger space in 1957.

Grace Evangelical Methodist Church moved into the building in 1959, and its name remains above the entrance arch. In 1964, the building became the home of the Greenville Labor Temple Cooperative; and in 1977, Faith Tabernacle Apostolic Church bought the building and held its first service there in May 1978.

A photo studio bought the building in 1988 and sold it in 2004. Although the building was originally located in a residential area, commercial development and urban renewal isolated it, and it was abandoned in 2010. In 2015 the building was restored and repurposed as a private residence for the local entrepreneurs Melinda Lehman and Terry Iwaskiw. No evidence of the building's use as a synagogue remains except for a small brick-and-tile Star of David on either side of the parapet.

The building was listed on the National Register of Historic Places in 2016.

== See also ==
- National Register of Historic Places listings in Greenville, South Carolina
