= West End (Greenville, South Carolina) =

Coordinates: 34.844°N 82.404°W

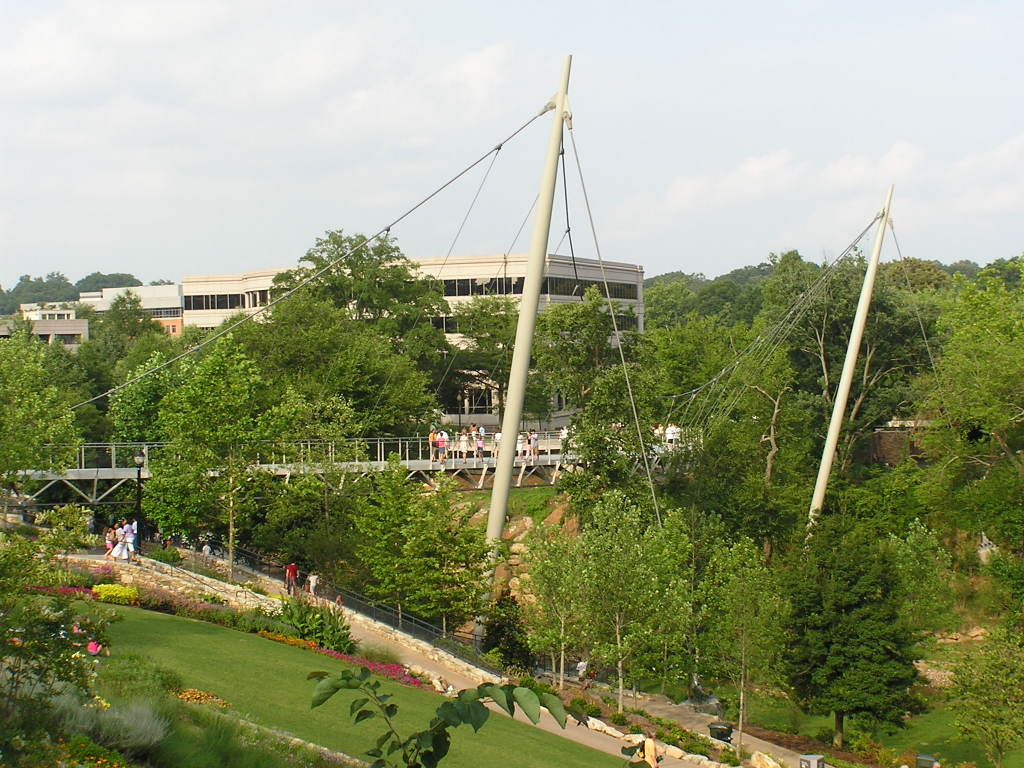
Liberty Bridge

West End is a neighborhood in Greenville, South Carolina. Located across the Reedy River in downtown, the west end became home to Furman University when it was first established in 1852. The school expanded to fill fifty acres and then moved to its current location northwest of the city in 1958. The Greenville and Columbia Railroad (now part of Norfolk Southern) arrived there in 1853, bringing increased commercial activity to the neighborhood that had been first settled in the 1830s.

This activity was truncated less than a decade later with the coming of the American Civil War of 1861–65. After the war, though, the introduction of new fertilizers made cotton farming profitable again in the area. Cotton and fertilizer warehouses and numerous support industries sprung up. The commercial success, with its accompanying residential requirements, brought churches and schools to the west end. Chicora College was established in 1893 for women before relocating to Columbia 22 years later. (It merged with Queens University of Charlotte in North Carolina in 1930.)

After the turn of the twentieth century, many textile mills moved into the area from locations nearer to Greenville's center. But by 1930 the shift from textile mills to soft drink manufacturing and bottling had begun. As more and more automobiles became common, dealerships and repair shops also were constructed,

Since the 1970s the West End has been revitalized after many years of decline. In the 2010s the West End Historic District has become the arts and entertainment center of the city. Anchored in the Falls Park on the Reedy, the Liberty Bridge (a pedestrian suspension bridge) crosses over the Reedy River. The Peace Center provides a venue for a large range of cultural events, while Fluor Field at the West End a provides seasonal home for the Greenville Drive, a minor league affiliate of the Boston Red Sox.

== See also ==
- West End Commercial Historic District (Greenville, South Carolina)
