= Pettigru Street Historic District =

Historic district in South Carolina, United States

- U.S. National Register of Historic Places
- U.S. Historic district
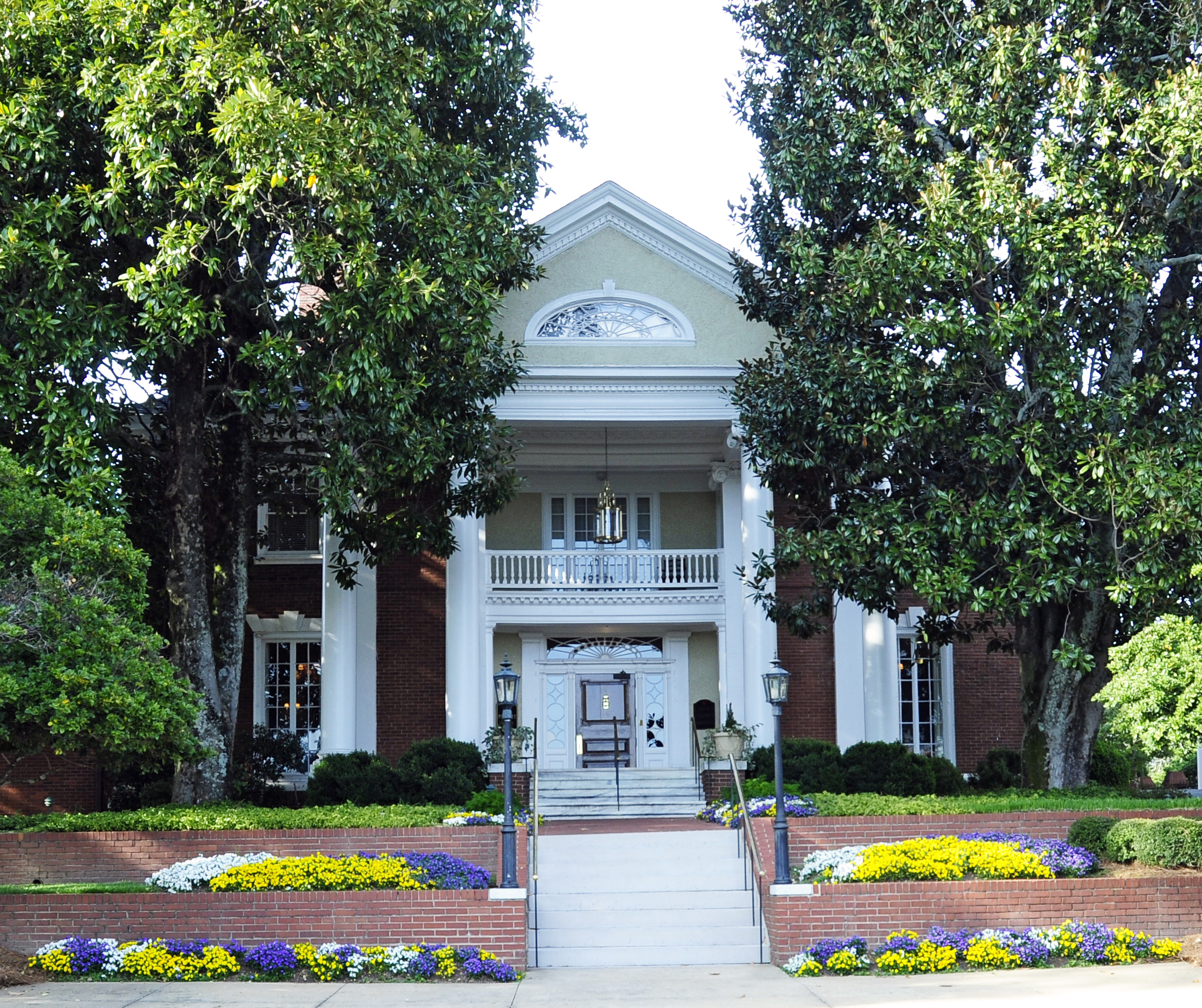

- Location within South Carolina Location within the United States
- Location: Pettigru, Whitsett, Williams, Manly, E. Washington, Broadus, Toy, and Boyce Sts., Greenville, South Carolina
- Coordinates: 34°51′0″N 82°23′23″W
- Area: 39 acres (16 ha)
- Built: 1890
- Architectural style: Colonial Revival, Bungalow/Craftsman, Queen Anne
- MPS: Greenville MRA
- NRHP reference No.: 82003862
- Added to NRHP: July 01, 1982

Pettigru Street Historic District is a historic tree-lined neighborhood east of Main Street in downtown Greenville, South Carolina. It is home to 88 structures built between 1890 and 1930 with the majority built between 1910 and 1930. It is known for its wide variety of architectural styles including Queen Anne, Colonial Revival, and Bungalow. The area is an example of evolution of architectural style from the Victorian era to the early 1930s similar to the growth in the city of Greenville as a whole during that time.

The land belonged to the James Boyce and Rowley families until the turn of the century. At that time, the land was divided into multiple lots, development increased, and several new streets were added. It was home to the prominent business people and mill owners in the area.

Nominated in 1981, the Pettigru Street Historic District was listed on the National Register of Historic Places in 1982 making it the largest district in the city. It is one of several historic listings in the town of Greenville. The past few years have seen a commercial encroachment into this district, which is now about half commercial and half residential. Key properties include the Poinsett Club on East Washington Street, Hayne School on Toy Street, and Pettigru Place Bed and Breakfast on Pettigru Street.
