= C.F. Haynsworth Federal Building and United States Courthouse =

Historic building in South Carolina, U.S.

- U.S. Post Office and Courthouse
- U.S. National Register of Historic Places
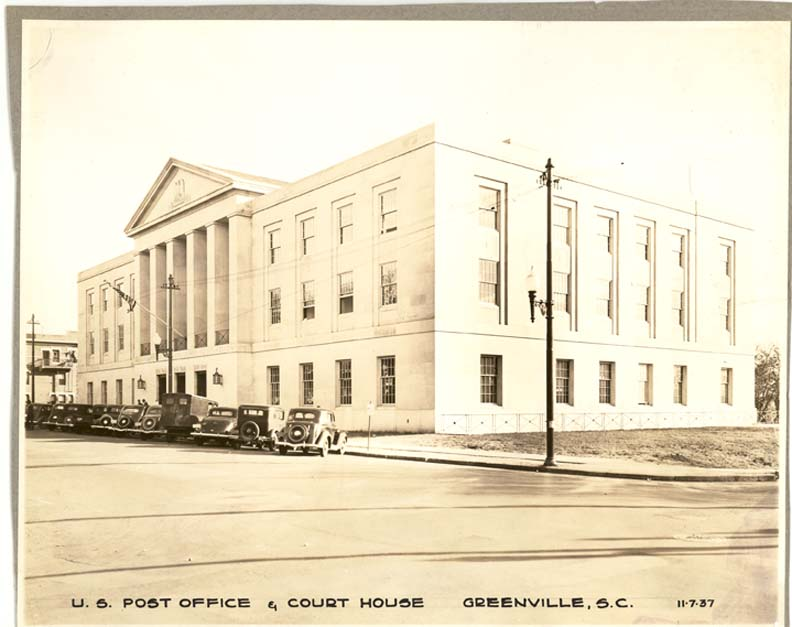
- 1937 photo

- Location within South Carolina Location within the United States
- Location: 300 East Washington Street, Greenville, South Carolina
- Coordinates: 34.8496°N 82.3961°W
- Area: 1.02 acres (0.41 ha)
- Built: 1937
- Architect: Eric Kebbon
- Architectural style: Classical Revival
- NRHP reference No.: 14000300
- Added to NRHP: June 9, 2014

The C.F. Haynsworth Federal Building and United States Courthouse, formerly known as the U.S. Post Office and Courthouse, is a historic civic building at 300 East Washington Street in Greenville, South Carolina. It is named for jurist Clement Haynsworth. It is a three-story building, clad in limestone with granite trim, resting on a brick foundation. It was designed by Eric Kebbon and built in 1937 with funding from the federal Public Works Administration, and was designed to house the local post office and federal court facilities. It continues to perform these functions, also housing other federal offices.

The building was listed on the National Register of Historic Places in 2014.

== See also ==
- National Register of Historic Places listings in Greenville, South Carolina
