= Greenville Elks Lodge =

- U.S. National Register of Historic Places
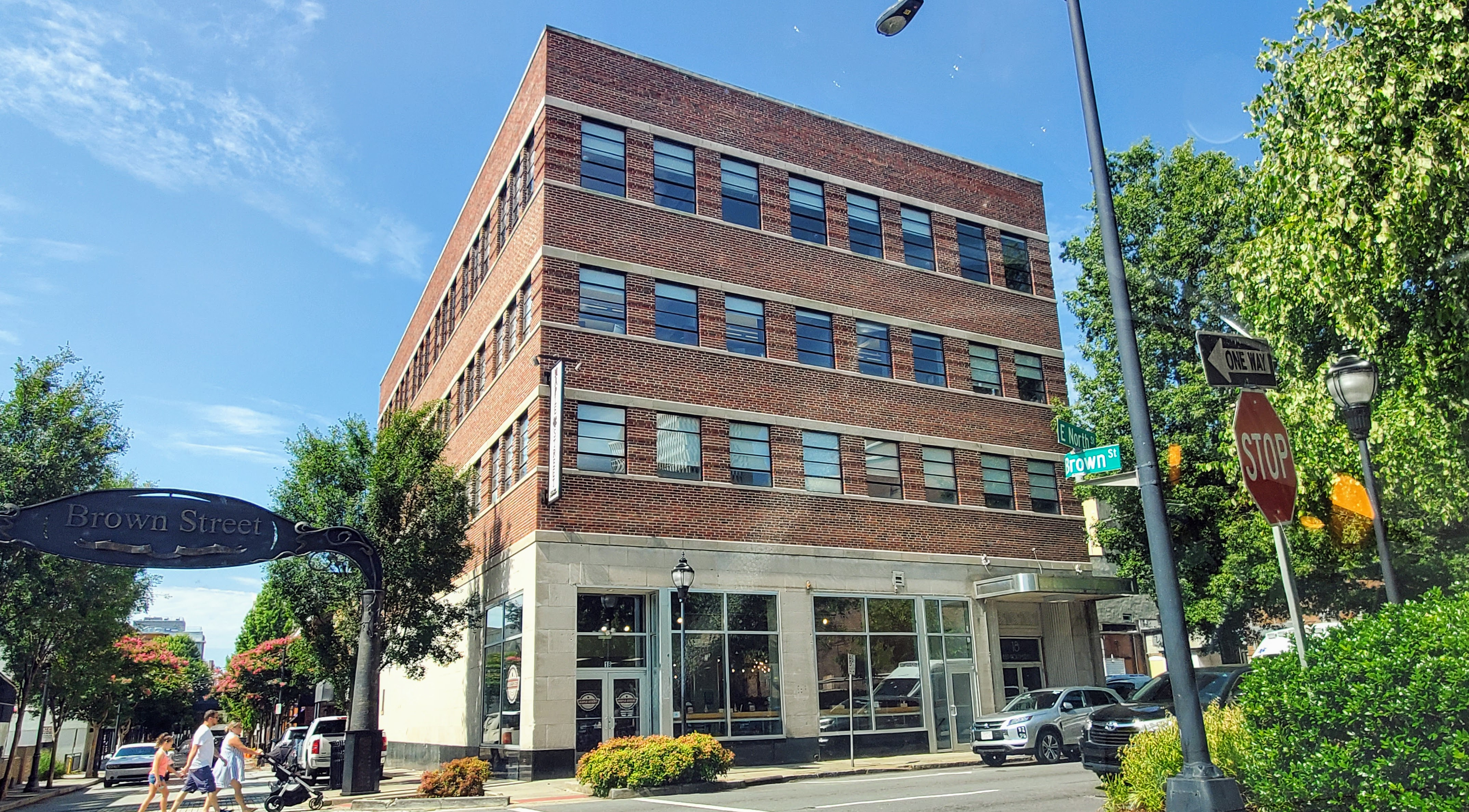

- Location within South Carolina Location within the United States
- Location: 18 E. North St., Greenville, South Carolina
- Coordinates: 34°51′8″N 82°23′51″W
- Area: 1.2 acres (0.49 ha)
- Built: 1949
- Architectural style: Art Deco; Moderne
- NRHP reference No.: 15000707
- Added to NRHP: October 5, 2015

The Greenville Elks Lodge is a historic commercial and fraternal club building at 18 East North Street in Greenville, South Carolina. It is a rectangular four-story building, finished in brick and stone. The main entrance is a particularly distinguished example of transitional Art Deco/Moderne styling, with fluted details in the stone work, and a transom with Art Deco diamond patterning. It was built in 1949 to a design by William Riddle Ward, a prominent local architect. It is the only known work in this style by Ward, who was better known for revival style designs, and is one of Greenville's only Art Deco designs. The building was occupied by Greenville Elks Lodge 858 until 1991.

The building was added to the National Register of Historic Places in 2015.

== See also ==
- National Register of Historic Places listings in Greenville, South Carolina
