= West End Commercial Historic District (Greenville, South Carolina) =

Historic district in South Carolina, United States

- U.S. National Register of Historic Places
- U.S. Historic district
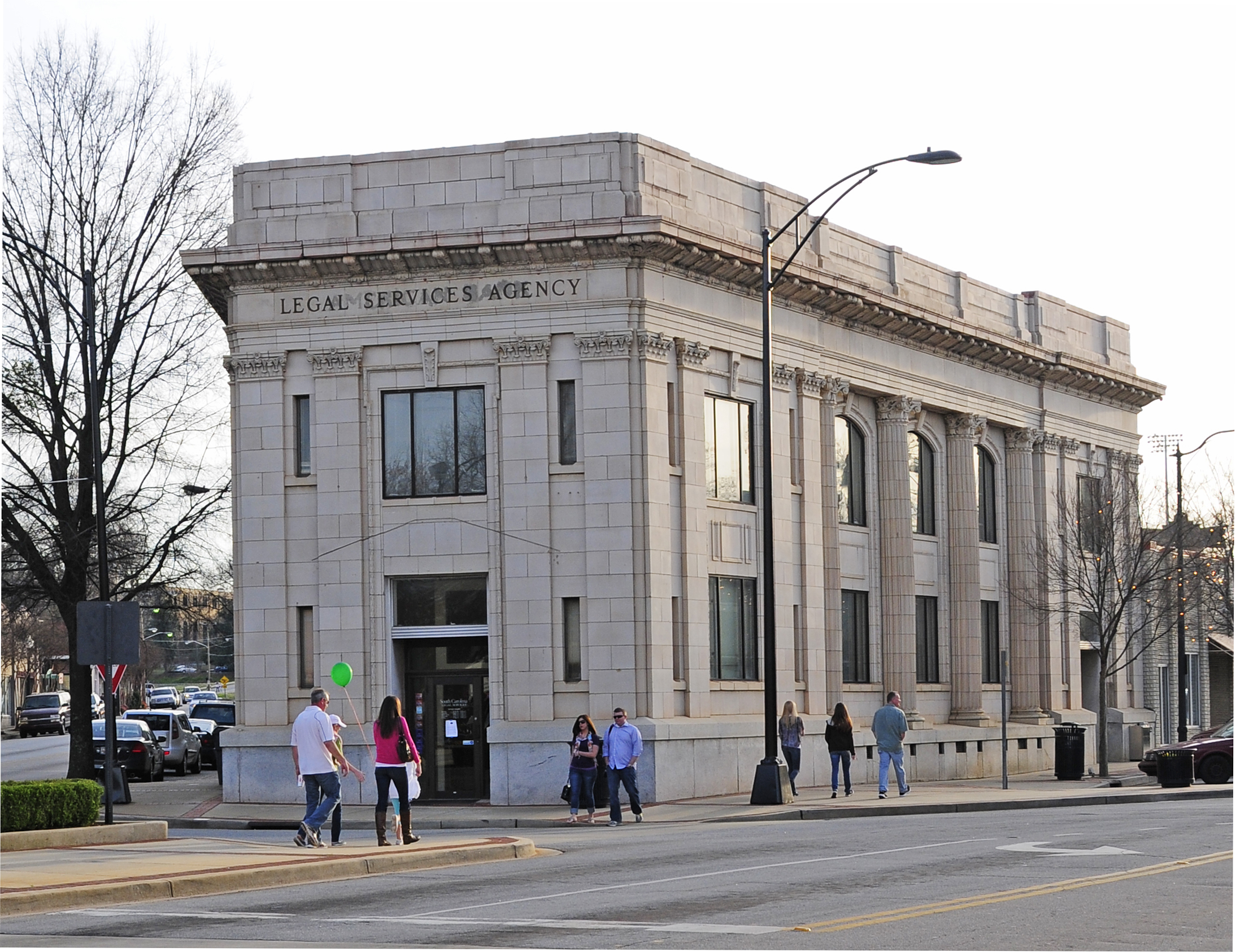
- American Bank, West End Commercial Historic District, March 2012

- Location within South Carolina Location within the United States
- Location: Roughly, jct. of Pendleton, River, Augusta and S. Main Sts. and E along Main to Camperdown Way, 631 S. Main St., Greenville, South Carolina
- Coordinates: 34°50′40″N 82°24′16″W
- Area: 4 acres (1.6 ha)
- Architect: Lawrence, Joseph T.
- Architectural style: Chicago, Late 19th And 20th Century Revivals
- NRHP reference No.: 92001751 (original); 98000559 (increase)

Significant dates
- Added to NRHP: January 7, 1993
- Boundary increase: May 29, 1998

West End Commercial Historic District is a national historic district located at Greenville, South Carolina. It encompasses 15 contributing buildings in Greenville's second "downtown." The commercial buildings primarily date from about 1880 to 1920, and include examples of Victorian commercial architecture. Notable buildings include the American Bank, Alliance and Mills & McBayer Cotton Warehouses, Indian River Fruit Store, Pete's Place, Bacot's West End Drug Store/Stringer's Drug, Furman Lunch, and Greer Thompson Building.

It was added to the National Register of Historic Places in 1993, with a boundary increase in 1998.

== See also ==
- West End (Greenville, South Carolina)
