= Davenport Apartments =

- U.S. National Register of Historic Places
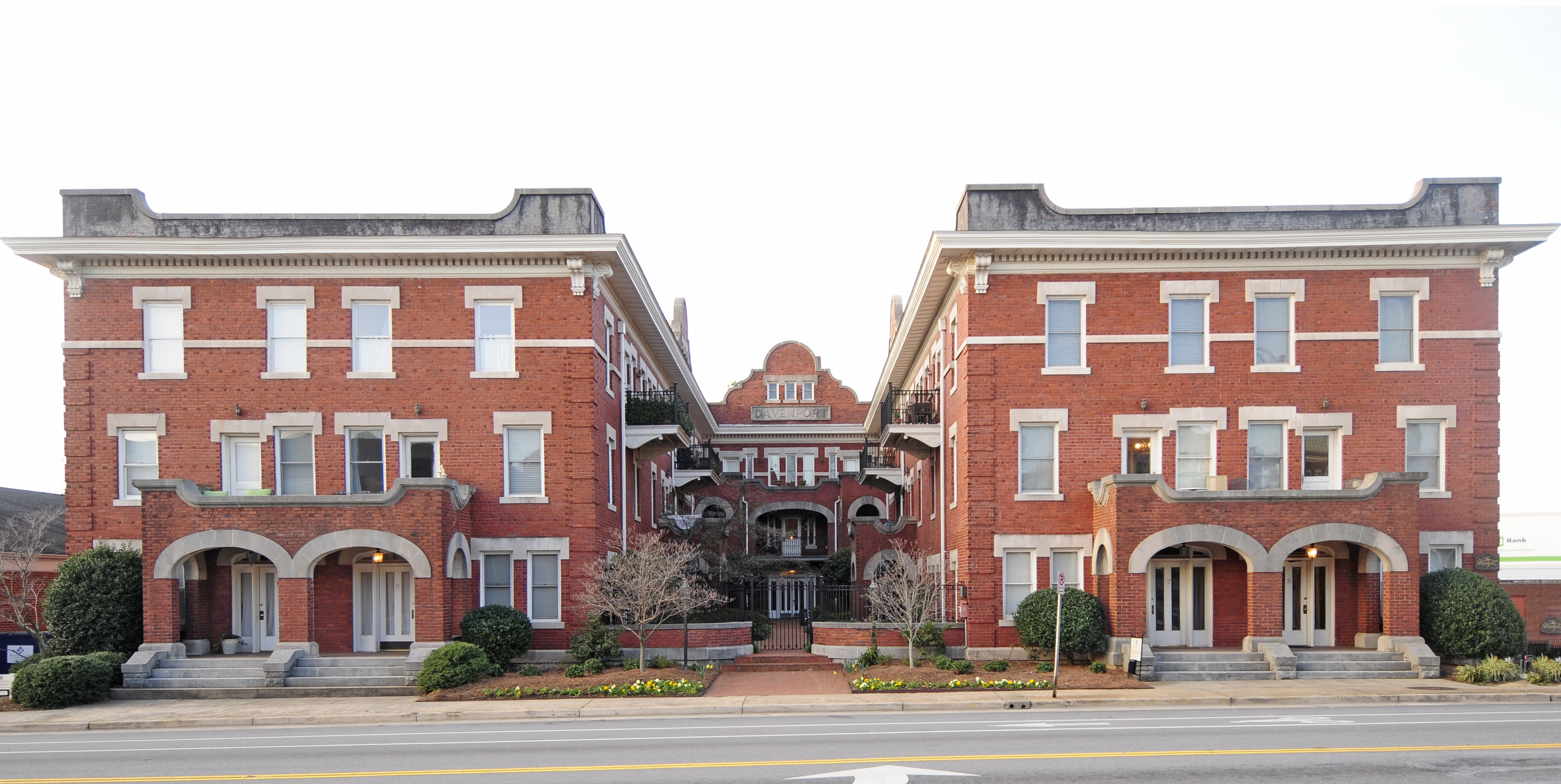
- Davenport Apartments, February 2012

- Location within South Carolina Location within the United States
- Location: 400-402 E. Washington St., Greenville, South Carolina
- Coordinates: 34°50′57″N 82°23′44″W
- Area: 0.4 acres (0.16 ha)
- Built: 1915-1916
- Built by: Gilphilan, Eugene
- Architect: Lawrence, J.L.
- MPS: Greenville MRA
- NRHP reference No.: 82003855
- Added to NRHP: July 1, 1982

Davenport Apartments is a historic apartment building located at Greenville, South Carolina. It was built in 1915–1916, and is a three-story, U-shaped, brick building. It consists of a large rectangular section in the rear with two smaller wings that extend from the rear block to the street. The front façade features two one-story porches with stone elliptical arches and brick pillars.

It was added to the National Register of Historic Places in 1982.
