= T. Q. Donaldson House =

Historic house in South Carolina, United States

- U.S. National Register of Historic Places
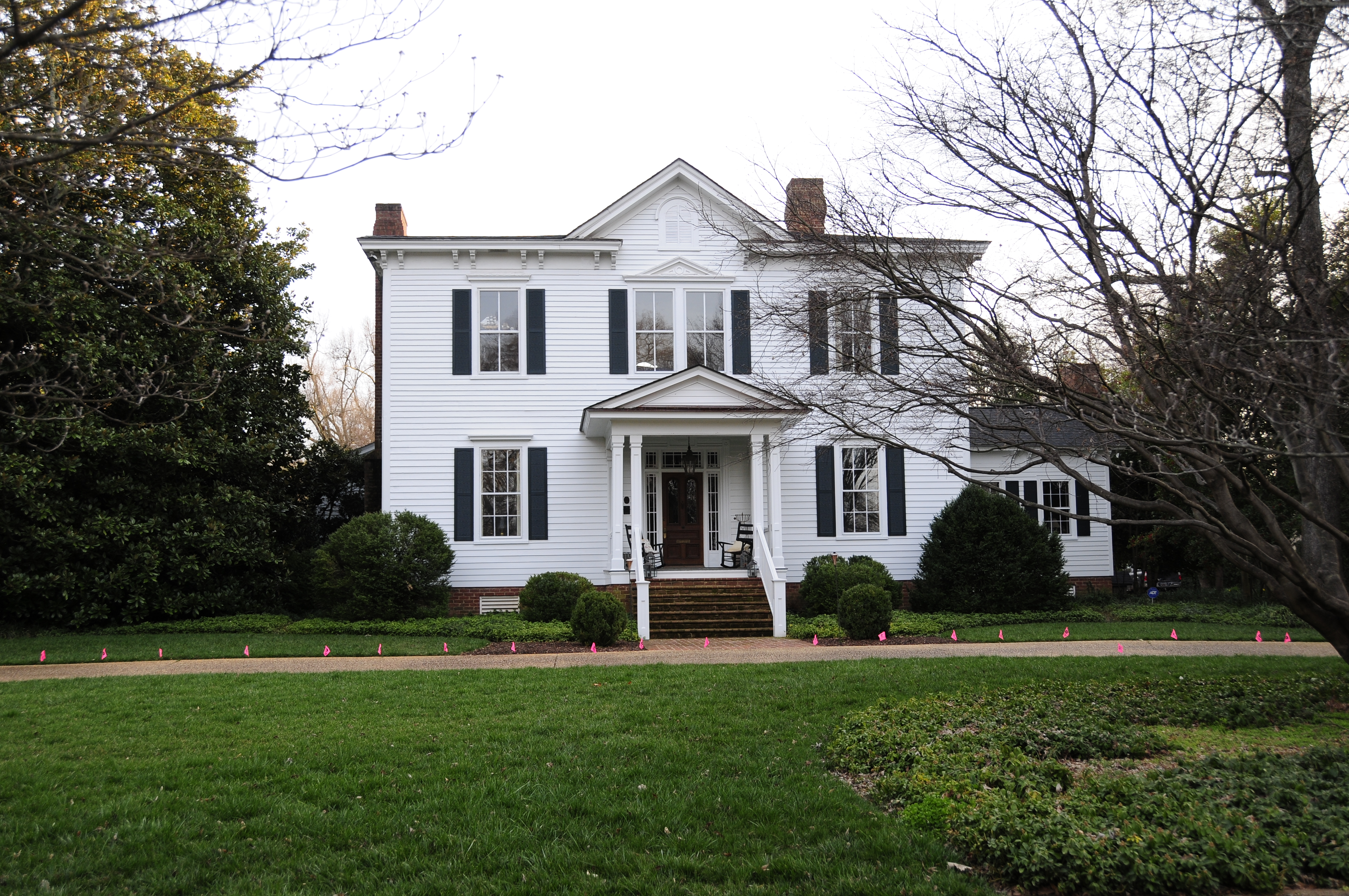
- T.Q. Donaldson House, February 2012

- Location within South Carolina Location within the United States
- Location: 412 Crescent Ave., Greenville, South Carolina
- Coordinates: 34°49′54″N 82°23′43″W
- Area: 1.8 acres (0.73 ha)
- Built: c. 1863
- Built by: Williams, William
- Architectural style: Italianate
- NRHP reference No.: 80003671
- Added to NRHP: September 4, 1980

T. Q. Donaldson House, also known as the Dr. Davis Furman House, is a historic home located at Greenville, South Carolina. It was built about 1863, and is a two-story, frame, vernacular Italianate style cottage. It consists of a two-story rectangular block with a one-story wing and one-story rear ells. Also on the property is a contemporary three-room frame, weatherboard outbuilding built for use as a kitchen and servant's quarters. It was built by William Williams for Thomas Q. Donaldson, a lawyer and member of the South Carolina Senate from Greenville County from 1872 to 1876.

It was added to the National Register of Historic Places in 1980.
