= Fountain Fox Beattie House =

Historic house in South Carolina, United States

- U.S. National Register of Historic Places
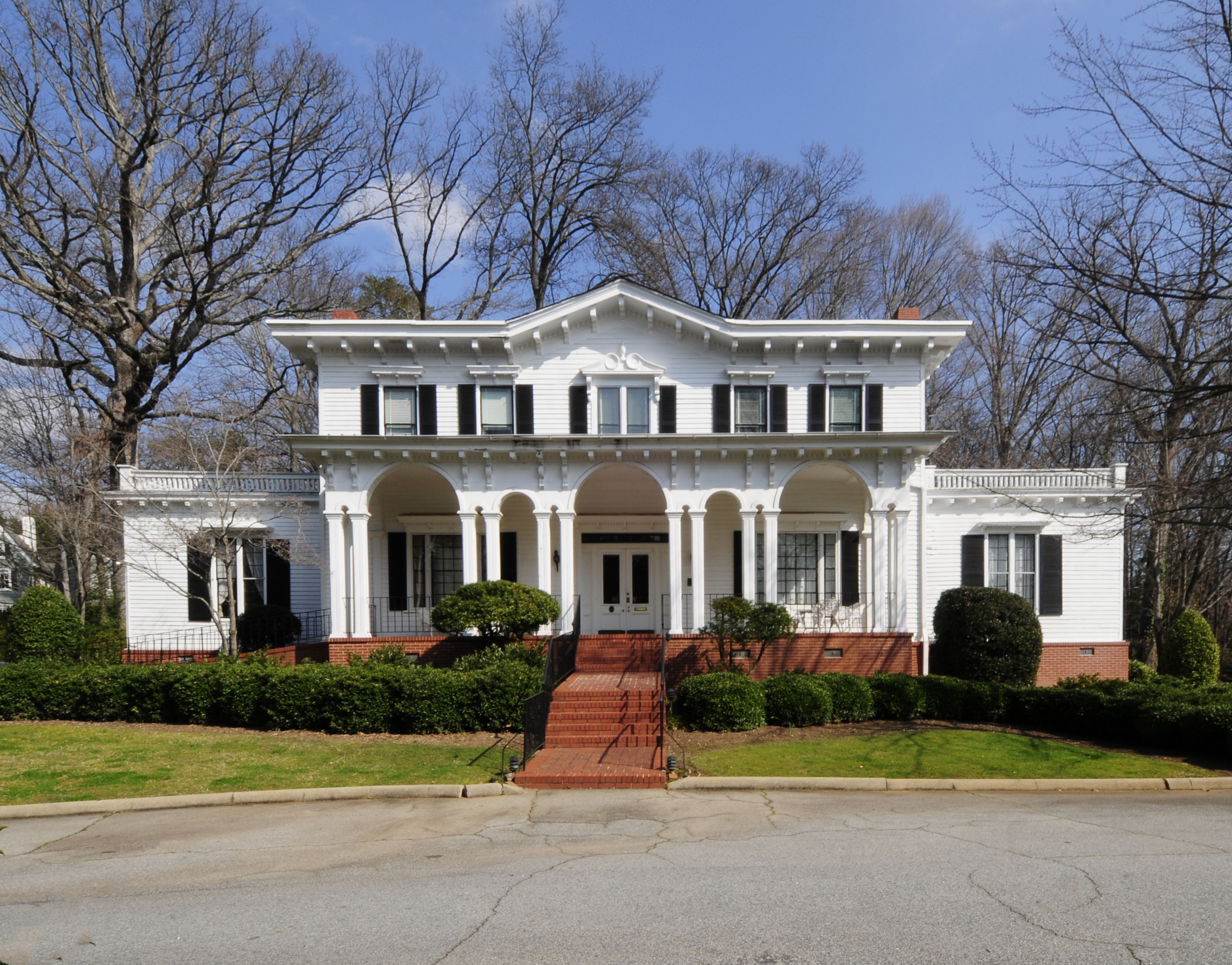
- Greenville Woman's Club

- Location within South Carolina Location within the United States
- Location: 8 Bennett Street, Greenville, South Carolina
- Coordinates: 34°51′25″N 82°23′22″W
- Area: less than one acre
- Built: 1834
- Architectural style: Italianate, Italian Villa
- NRHP reference No.: 74001859
- Added to NRHP: October 9, 1974

The Fountain Fox Beattie House, the home of Greenville Woman's Club from 1950 to 2014, is a historic house in Greenville, South Carolina. It was listed on the National Register of Historic Places in 1974.

== History ==
The house was built c. 1834 on East North Street by merchant and banker Fountain Fox Beattie for his bride, Emily Edgeworth. Originally the house had a simple design, two rooms on each floor with a separate kitchen behind the house. Beattie prospered even during Reconstruction, and generations of his family continued to live in the house well into the 20th century. Probably in the 1880s, the Beatties added one-story wings and an elaborately columned porch with Italianate brackets. After the death of Mrs. John Beattie in 1938, the family rented out the house. In 1946, when the house stood in the way of street widening and was slated for demolition, Greenville club women asked the city to buy and preserve the house as their meeting place. The house was moved to a new street, named Beattie Place, and rented to the Woman's Club for a dollar a year. When Beattie Place also became a busy thoroughfare, the house was moved once again in 1983 to a site off Bennett Street.

In 2014, citing declining membership, the Greenville Woman's Club disbanded, and ownership of the historic house reverted to the city of Greenville. The city negotiated with Black Knight International, a development group owned by Marc Player, son of professional golfer Gary Player, which planned to repurpose the building into office space. After Black Knight declined to buy the house, the city agreed to sell the house (with a preservation easement) to Greenvillians Ryan and Jori Magg, who reconvert meeting and event space back into living area.

== Architecture ==
The two-story structure has one-story wings. The roof on the central portion is flat except for a small central gable. The wings have a flat, balustraded roof. There is a one-story piazza supported by six pairs of columns. These form three large and two smaller arches. The main entrance is a set of double doors.
