= First National Bank (Greenville, South Carolina) =

- U.S. National Register of Historic Places
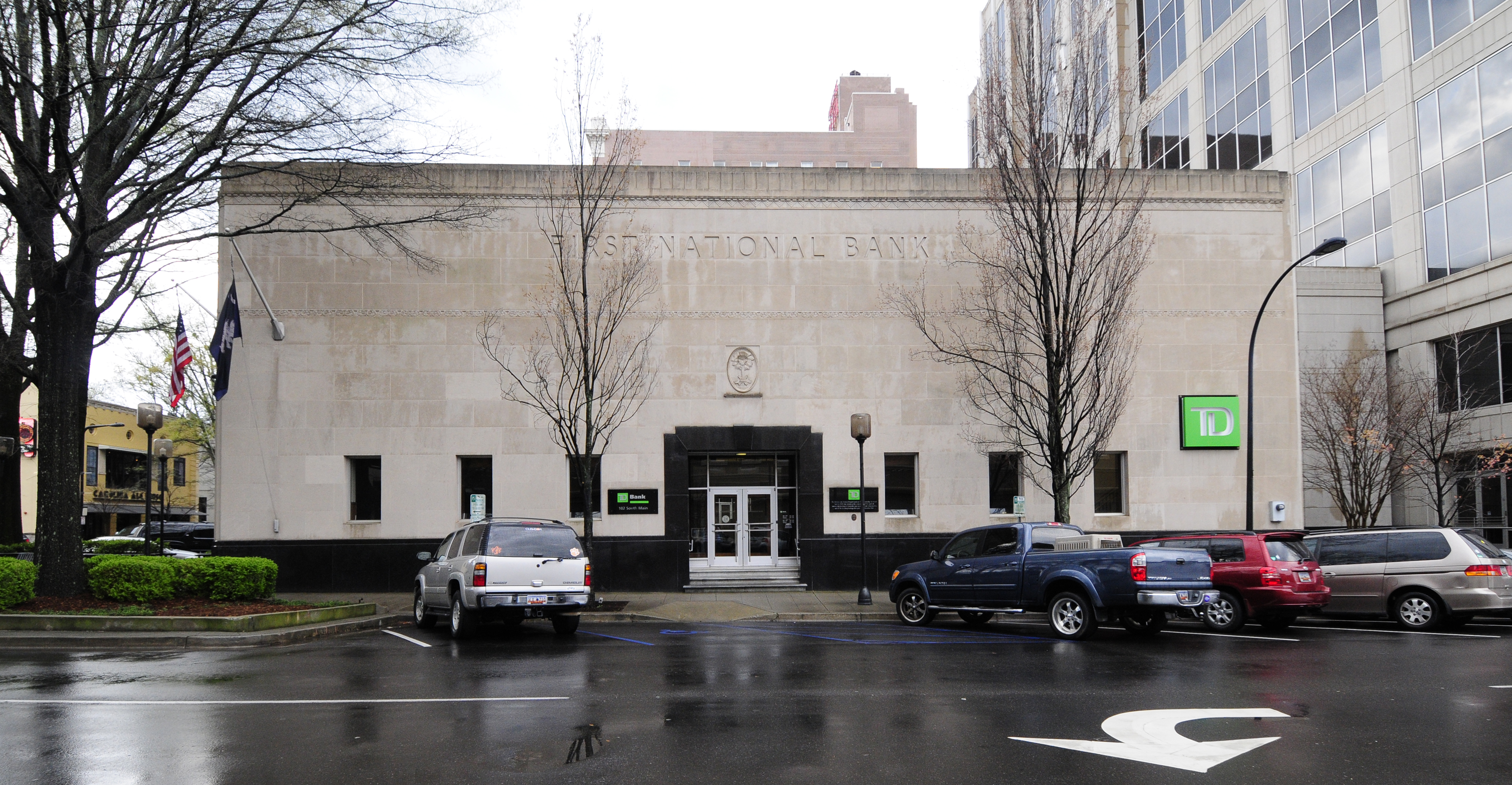
- First National Bank, March 2012

- Location within South Carolina Location within the United States
- Location: 102 S. Main St., Greenville, South Carolina
- Coordinates: 34°50′57″N 82°24′40″W
- Area: less than one acre
- Built: 1938
- Built by: Morris & McKoy
- Architect: Trowbridge, Silas L.
- Architectural style: Art Deco
- NRHP reference No.: 89002152
- Added to NRHP: December 21, 1989

First National Bank, also known as Carolina First Bank, is a historic bank building located at Greenville, South Carolina. Designed by architect Silas L. Trowbridge of Atlanta, Georgia, it was built in 1938, and is a 2 1/2-story, sandstone sheathed steel frame Art Deco building. The building was enlarged in 1952. The building features a polished black granite door frame and base, a geometric-patterned cornice and a frieze band, stylized sunburst aluminum grill work, and fluted aluminum pilasters topped with stylized aluminum eagles.

It was added to the National Register of Historic Places in 1989. It currently houses a branch of TD Bank, N.A., which merged with Carolina First Bank in 2010.
