= Gilfillin and Houston Building =

- U.S. National Register of Historic Places
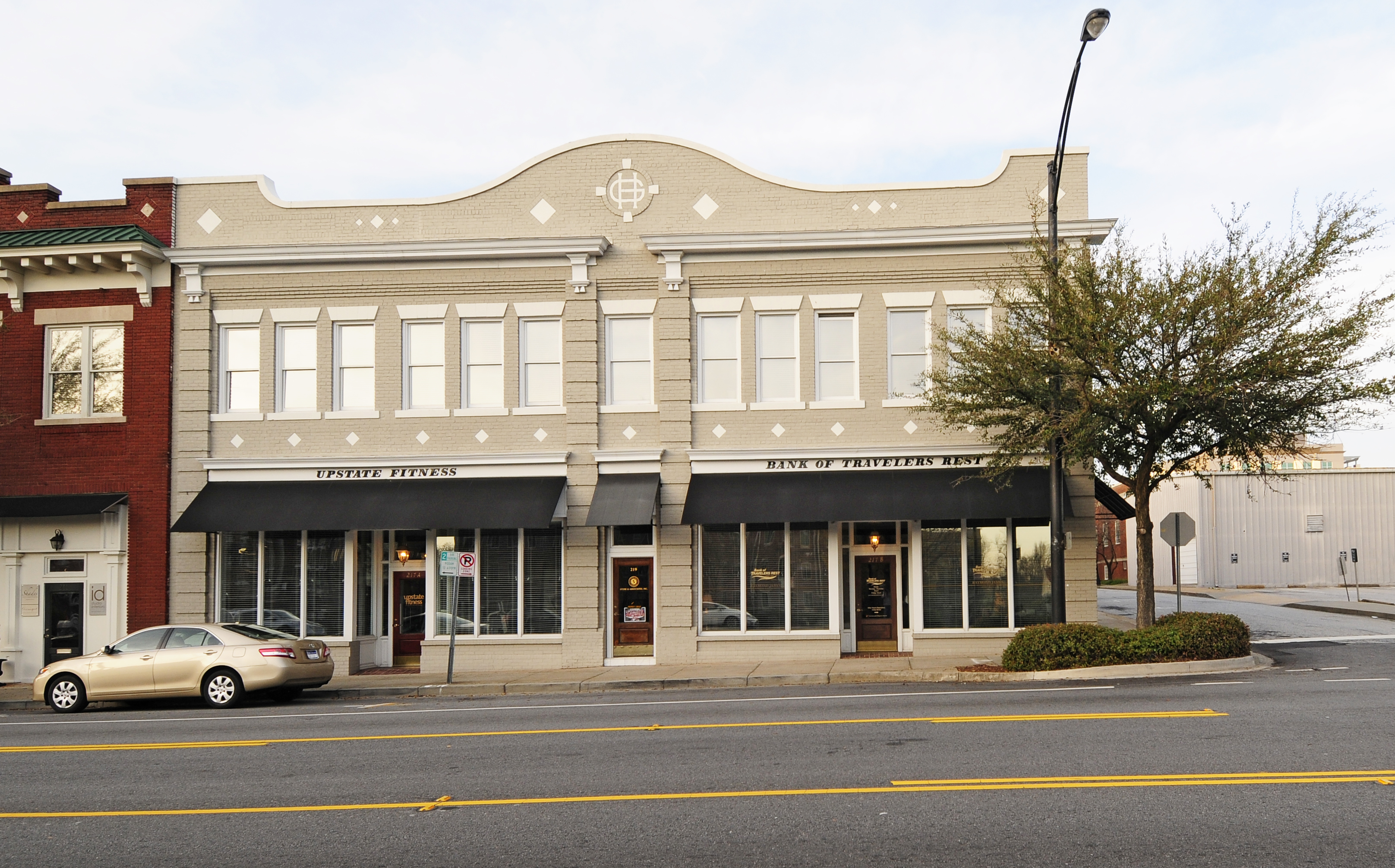
- Gilfllin and Houston Building, March 2012

- Location within South Carolina Location within the United States
- Location: 217-219 E. Washington St., Greenville, South Carolina
- Coordinates: 34°51′0″N 82°23′48″W
- Area: less than one acre
- Built: 1915
- Architectural style: Early Commercial
- NRHP reference No.: 04000589
- Added to NRHP: June 9, 2004

Gilfillin and Houston Building also known as Greenville Bakery and Greenville Auto Sales, is a historic commercial building located at Greenville, South Carolina. It was built in 1915, and is a two-story, brick commercial block. The building's façade is organized into two storefront sections and features a curvilinear brick gable and parapet embellished with a central, circular, limestone-keyed and brick-surrounded cartouche containing the letters "G" and "H" intertwined.

It was added to the National Register of Historic Places in 2004.
