= Carolina Supply Company =

- U.S. National Register of Historic Places
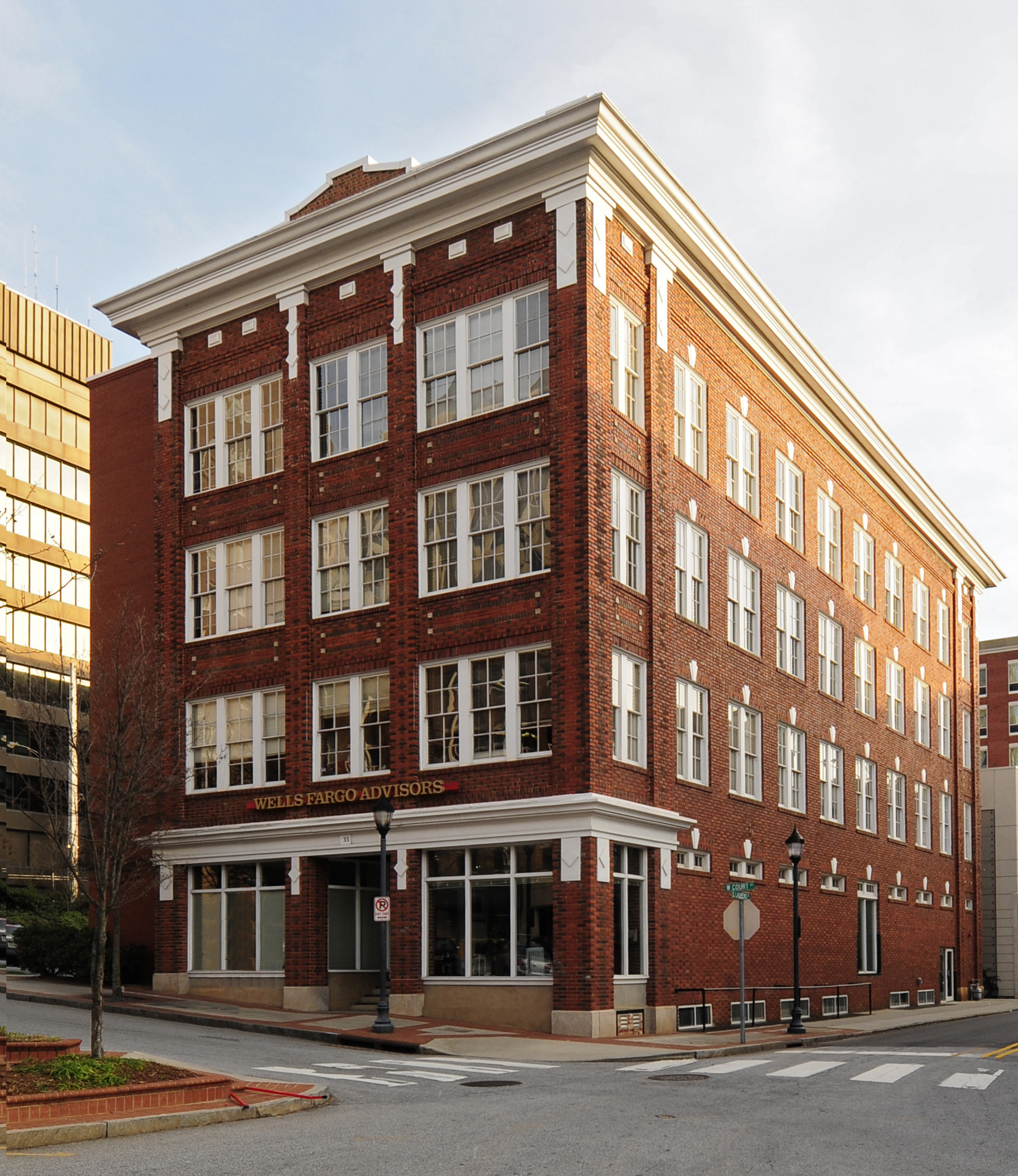
- Carolina Supply Company, March 2012

- Location within South Carolina Location within the United States
- Location: 35 W Court St., Greenville, South Carolina
- Coordinates: 34°50′55″N 82°24′05″W
- Area: less than one acre
- Built: 1914
- Built by: Carter-Fiske Construction
- Architect: Sirrine, J.E.
- Architectural style: Renaissance
- NRHP reference No.: 97000743
- Added to NRHP: July 3, 1997

Carolina Supply Company is a historic commercial building located at Greenville, South Carolina. It was built in 1914, and is a four-story, brick building in a utilitarian Renaissance Revival style. The building housed a textile and industrial supply company that supplied mills with equipment and supplies. The building now houses Wells Fargo Bank.

It was added to the National Register of Historic Places in 1997.
