= American Cigar Factory =

- U.S. National Register of Historic Places
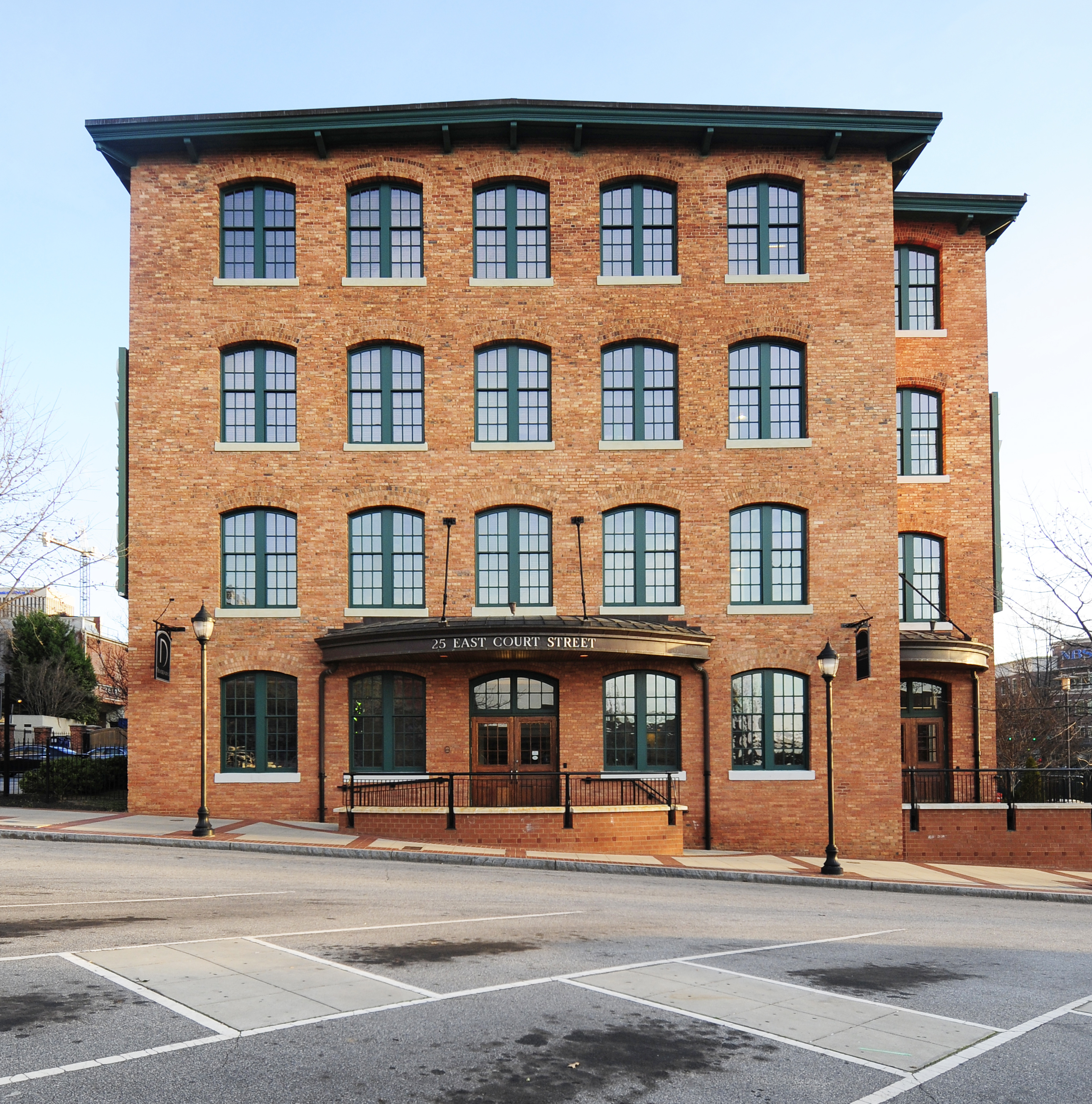
- American Cigar Factory, February 2012

- Location within South Carolina Location within the United States
- Location: 25 E. Court St., Greenville, South Carolina
- Coordinates: 34°50′54″N 82°23′56″W
- Area: 0.3 acres (0.12 ha)
- Built: 1902
- Built by: American Improvement Co.
- MPS: Greenville MRA
- NRHP reference No.: 82003853
- Added to NRHP: July 1, 1982

American Cigar Factory, also known as Stone Manufacturing Company, is a historic factory building located at Greenville, South Carolina.

== History ==
It was built about 1902, and is a four-story, rectangular brick building with segmental arch openings.

It was added to the National Register of Historic Places in 1982.

== Characteristics ==
It has a low-pitched gable roof with a projecting eave and floors supported by wooden posts.
