= Lanneau-Norwood House =

Historic house in South Carolina, United States

- U.S. National Register of Historic Places
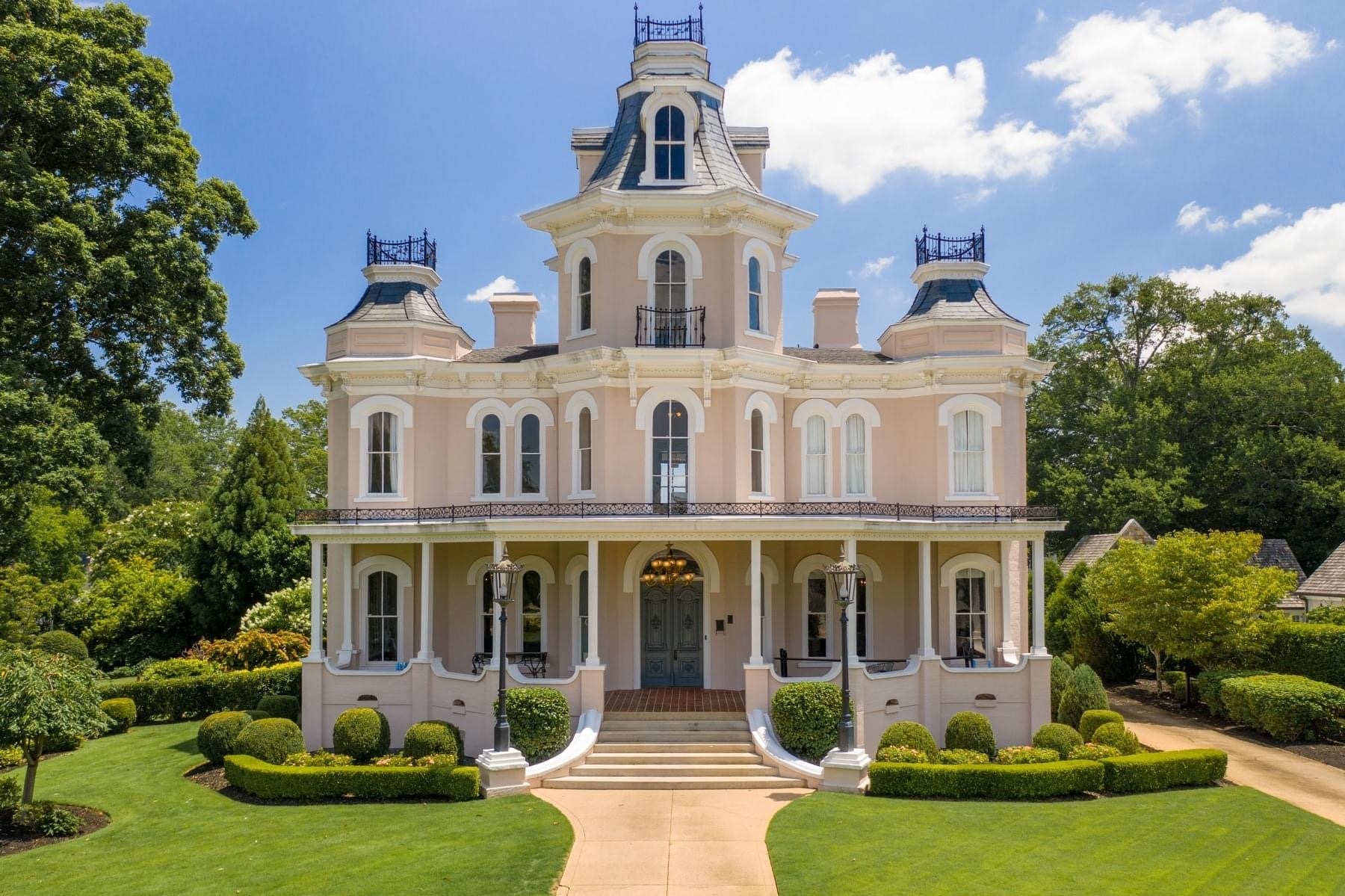
- Lanneau-Norwood House (2021)

- Location within South Carolina Location within the United States
- Location: 411 Belmont Avenue, Greenville, South Carolina
- Coordinates: 34°49′58″N 82°23′34″W
- Area: 0.816 acres (0.330 ha)
- Built: c. 1876
- Architect: Jacob W. Cagle
- Architectural style: Second Empire
- MPS: Greenville MRA
- NRHP reference No.: 82003860
- Added to NRHP: July 1, 1982

The Lanneau-Norwood House (Lanneau-Norwood-Funderburk House or "Alta Vista") is a historic, late 19th-century house on Belmont Avenue in Greenville, South Carolina. The house is an outstanding example of Second Empire architecture in the American South and is one of the last surviving Victorian-era homes in Greenville. The property was added to the National Register of Historic Places in 1982.

== History ==
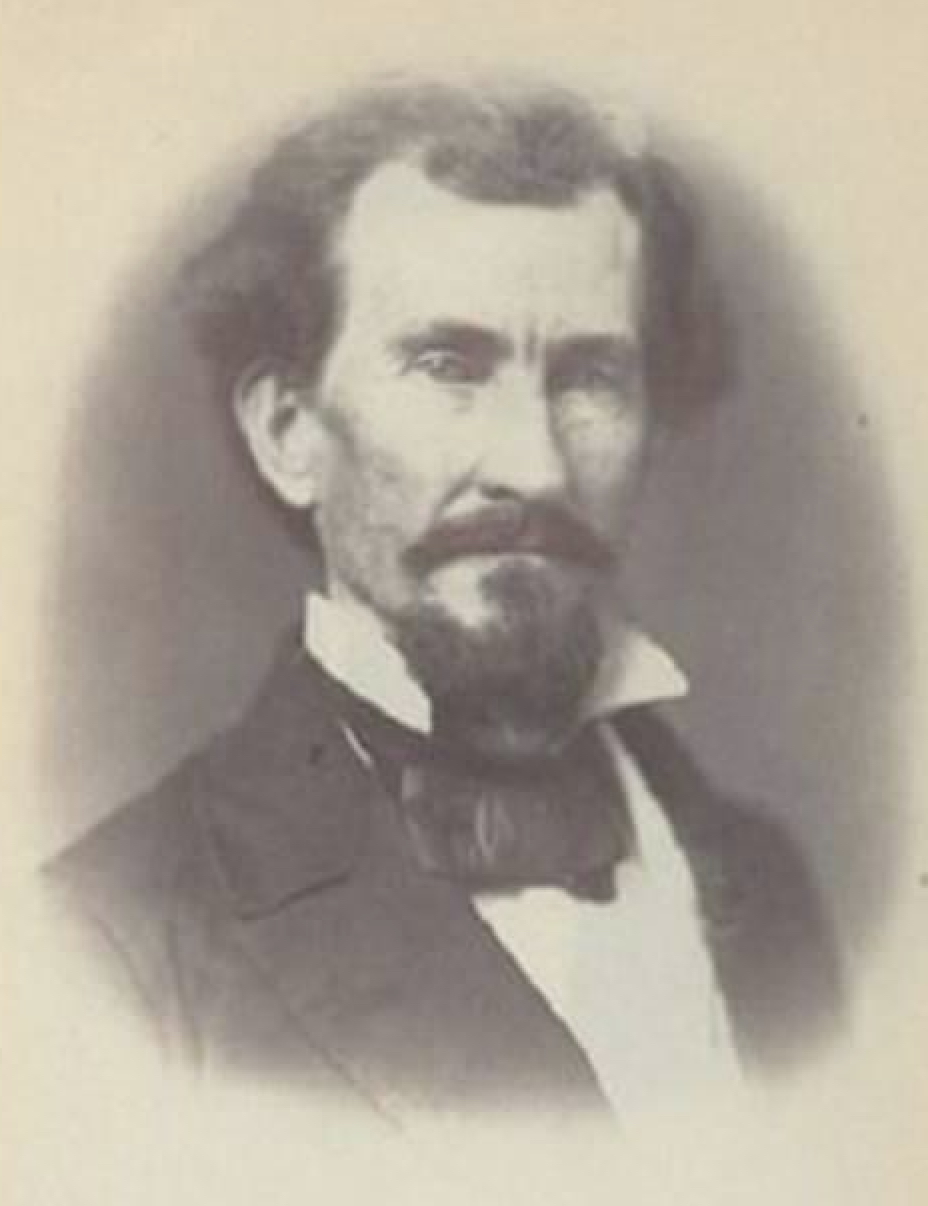
Charles Henry Lanneau

The house was built c. 1876 by Jacob W. Cagle (1832–1910) for Charleston native and textile entrepreneur, Charles Henry Lanneau II (1834-1913). The grounds may be the site of the last Civil War skirmish in South Carolina, fought May 23, 1865, between Union cavalry and Greenville home guards.

After returning from service in Hampton's Legion during the Civil War, Lanneau began his textile career as the bookkeeper for the Camperdown Mill. In 1882, Lanneau and Greenville attorney Thomas Quinton Donaldson organized Huguenot Mill, one of the first steam-powered textile mills in Upstate South Carolina. By 1888, Lanneau founded his own mill, Lanneau Manufacturing Company, on ten acres adjacent to his home.

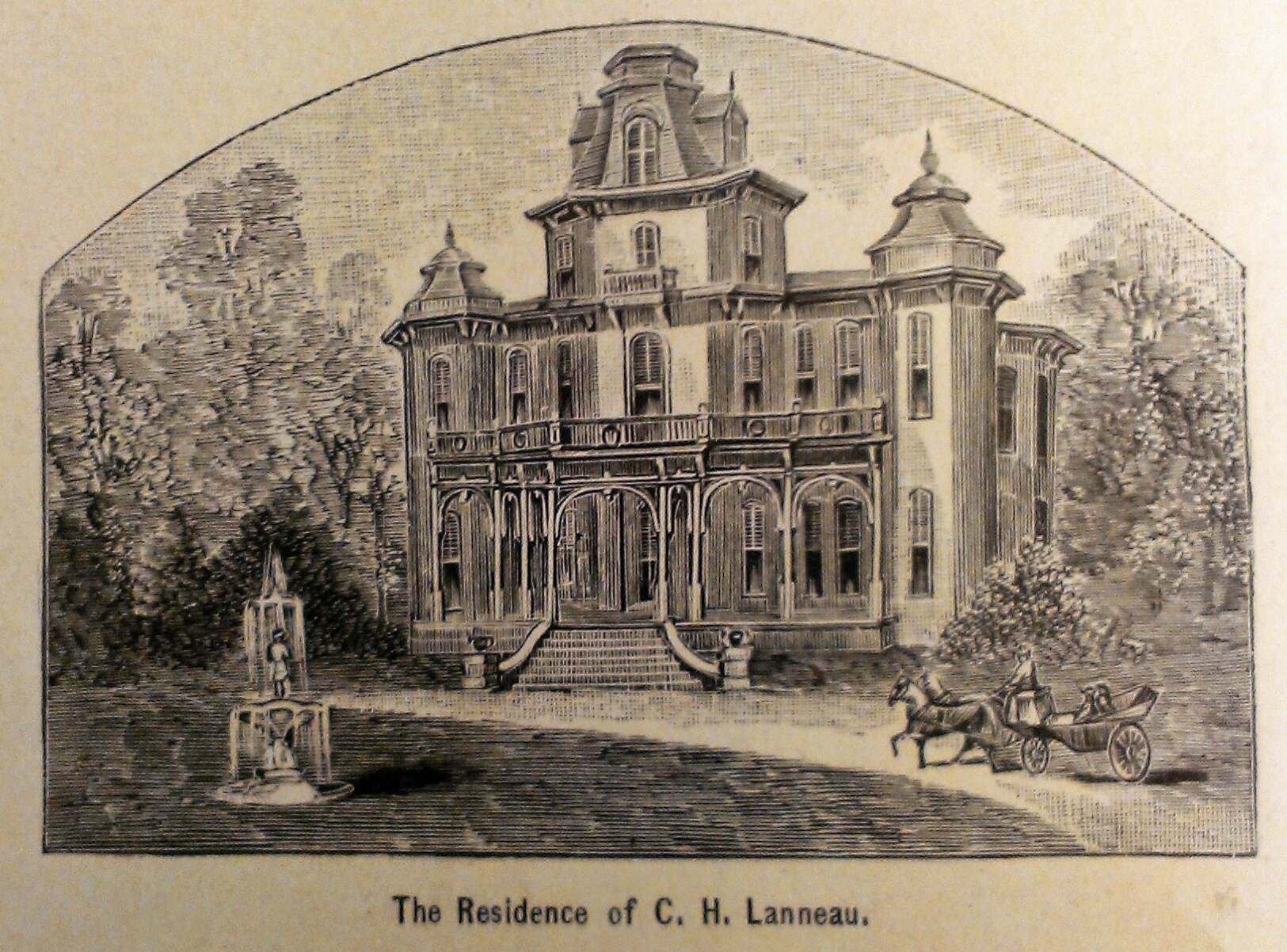
Engraving of Charles H. Lanneau House, 1892

Lanneau built the grand and fashionable residence on thirty-nine acres purchased from his sister, Sophie Lanneau Edwards, the widow of Rev. Peter Cuthbert Edwards, perhaps using money inherited from his first wife, Louisa (Lula) Williams Lanneau. A fire destroyed parts of the house in late 1883, and Lanneau rebuilt according to the original plan with slight modifications. Another fire in early 1892 left only brick walls standing, and Lanneau again rebuilt.

Bankrupt by 1907, Lanneau sold the house for $12,000 to South Carolina banker and textile financier, John Wilkins Norwood, a relative by marriage. Norwood added plumbing, electricity, and a coal furnace and supplied the house with drapes, tapestries, and furniture suggested by decorators from Wanamaker's in New York. At Norwood's death in 1945, the house passed to his son-in-law and daughter, Claud Sapp and Frances Norwood Funderburk, and then to their son and daughter-in-law, George Norwood and Ann Downen Funderburk, who took special interest in the gardens. The house was owned by John Fulton and Rosalind Sebastian Mills from July 2012 to October 2021, then sold to the Jennings-Gresham family.

== Design ==
The house is a 2 1/2-story, brick Second Empire-style mansion with a Mansard roof. The symmetrical façade is divided into five sections, with projecting central and corner pavilions, and an octagonal tower that extends a half-story above the cornice line of the main block of the house. The front porch spans the full-width of the façade, and consists of slender posts with scrolled brackets. Also on the property are a brick garage, a small greenhouse, and a two-room, one-story brick servants' quarters with a gable roof.

The house was originally at the center of the area now known as Alta Vista, facing McDaniel Avenue with a long, curved driveway that extended from the corner of Crescent Avenue to McIver Street. The property included a barn with livestock and fields that were planted with corn, butter beans, and spinach.

In 1977, a granddaughter of J. W. Norwood commissioned a dollhouse replica on a 1:12 scale.

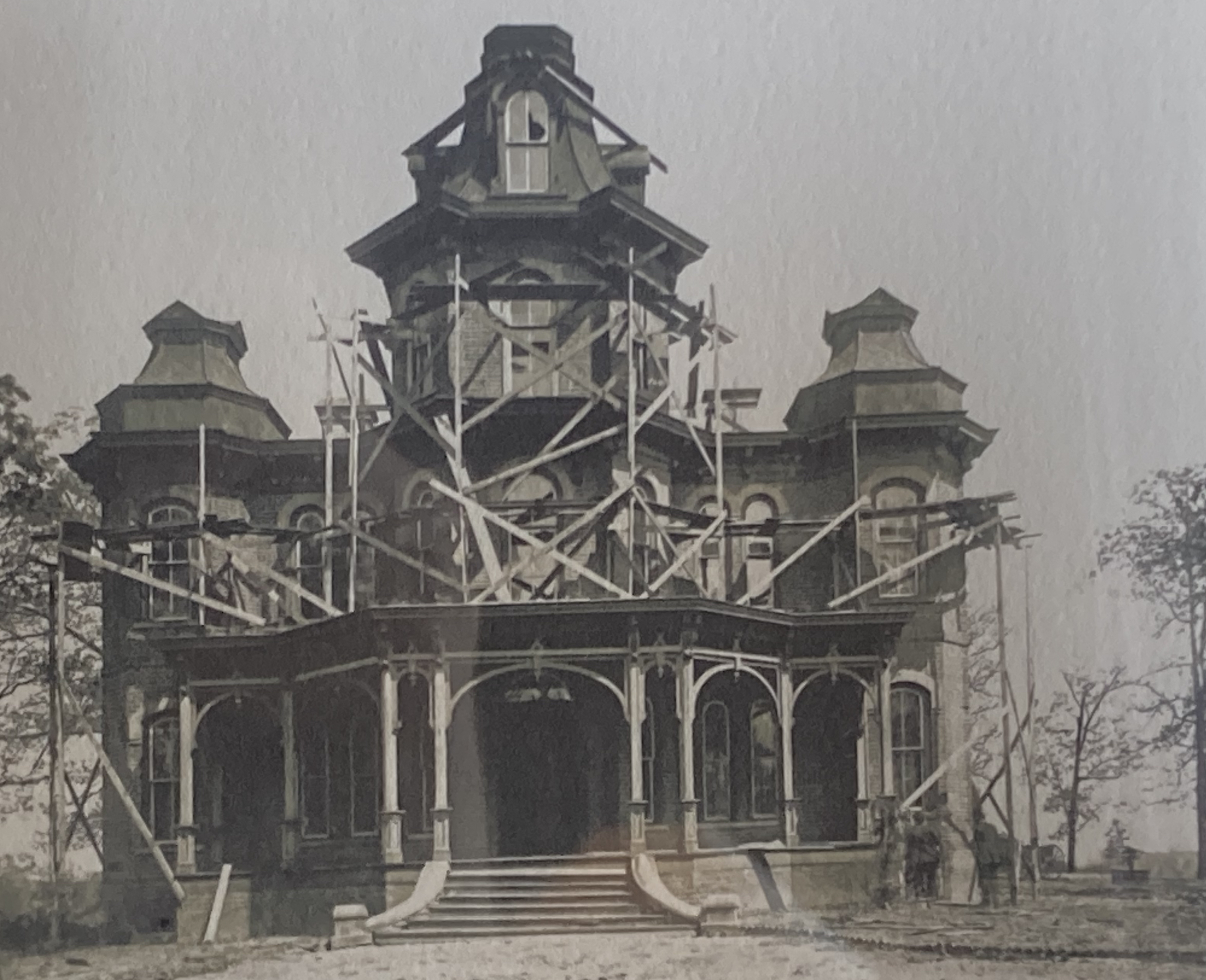
Construction of Lanneau-Norwood House

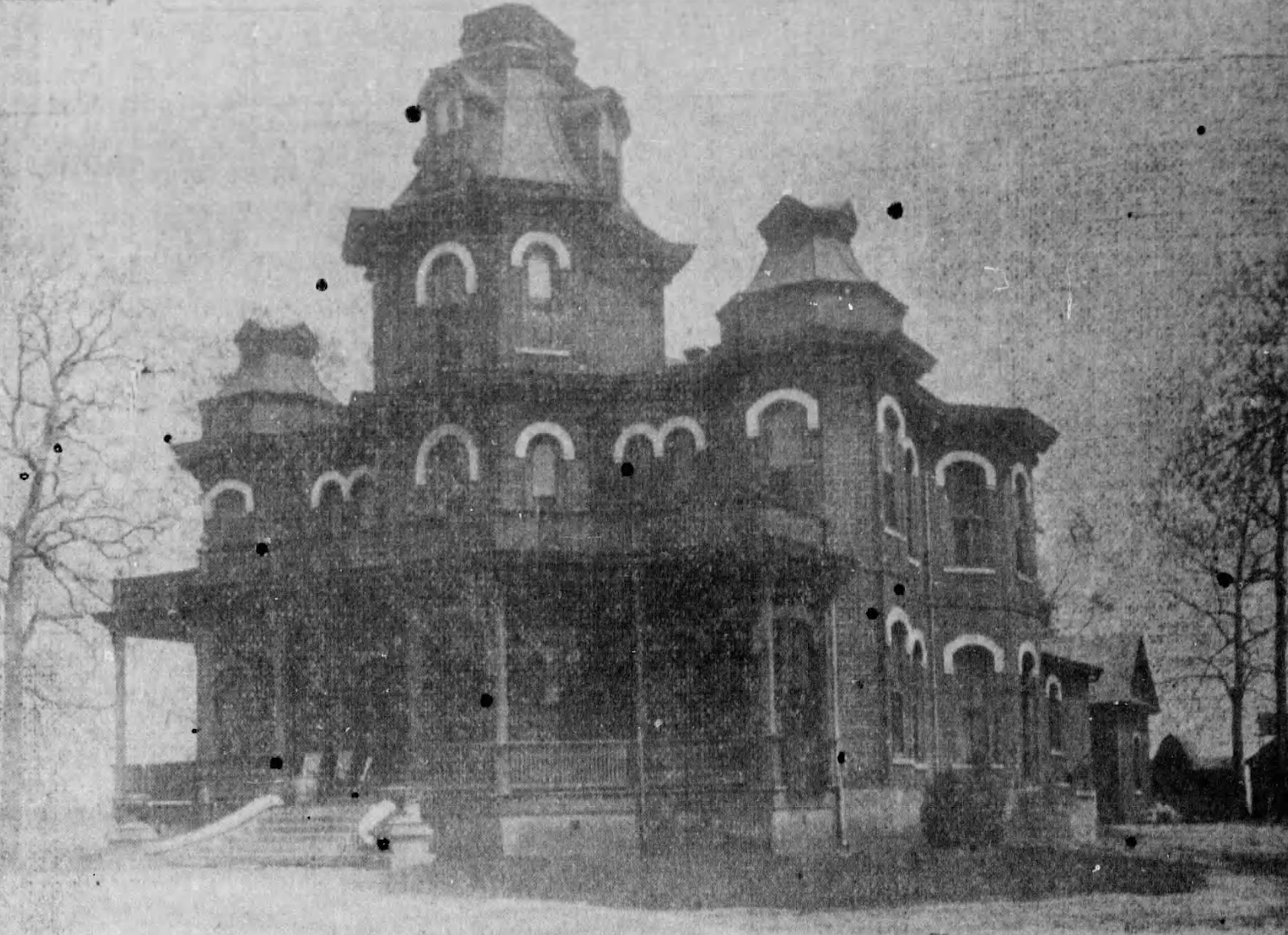
Lanneau-Norwood House, May 1913

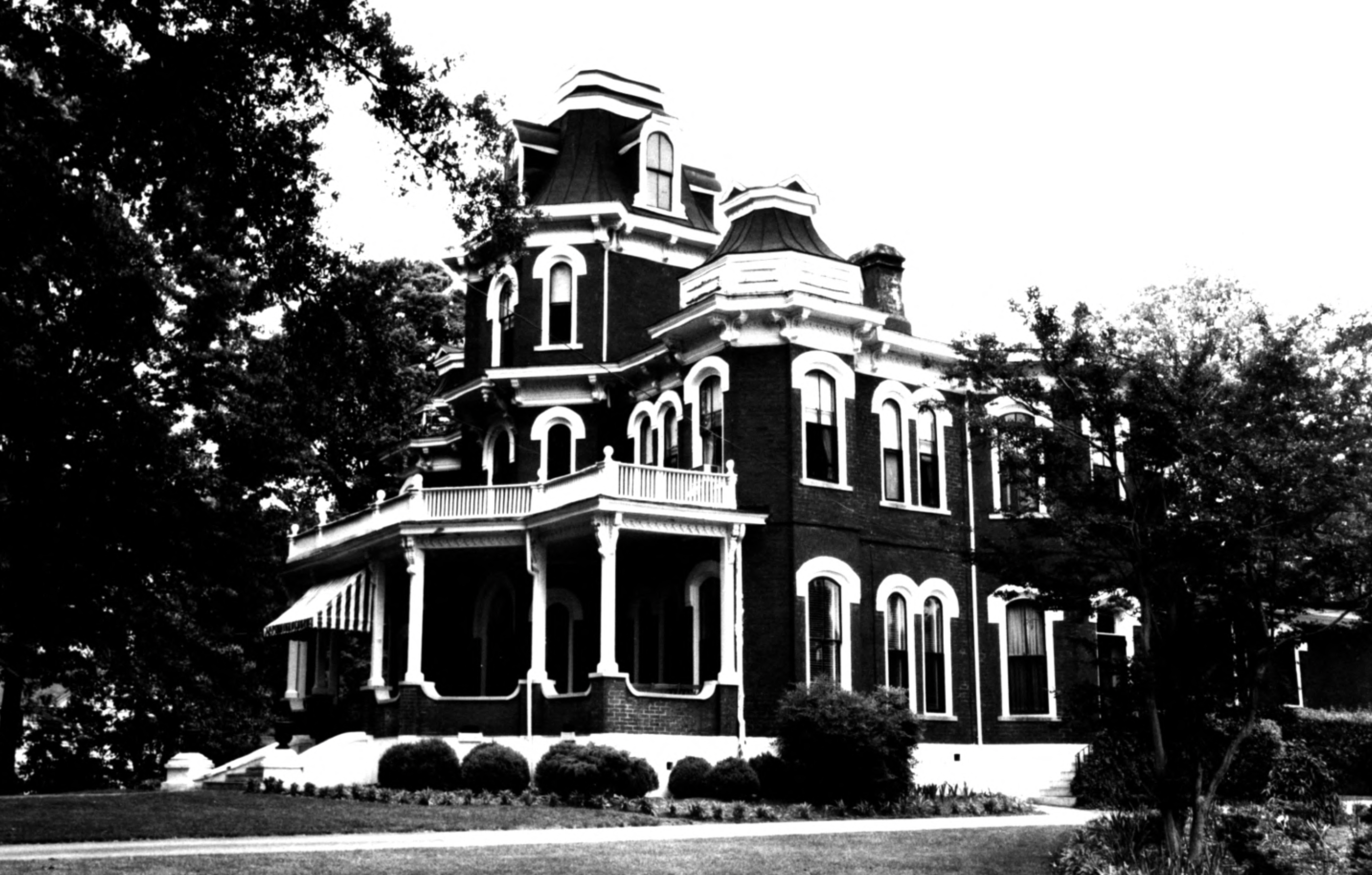
Lanneau-Norwood-Funderburk House, May 1981

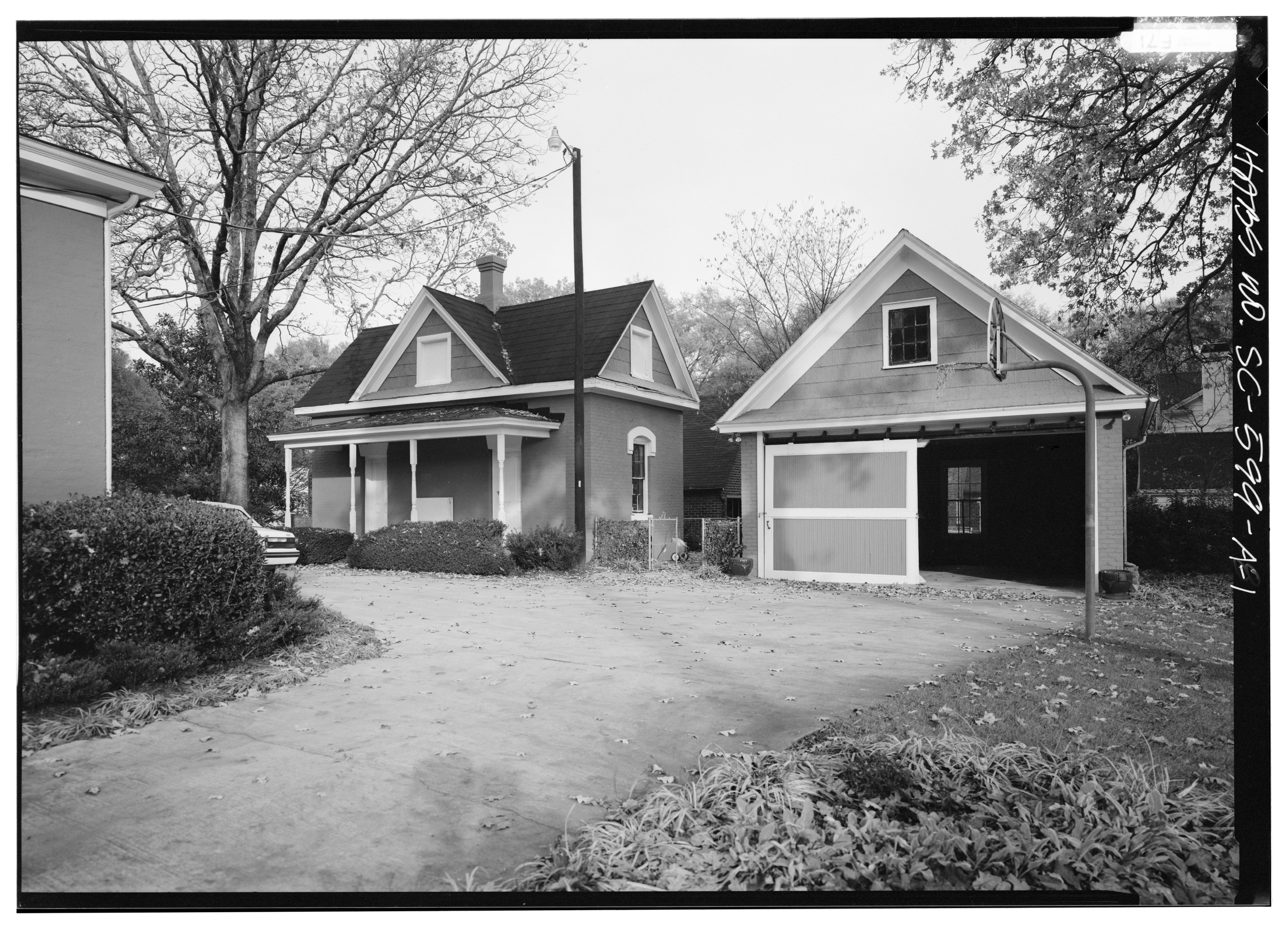
Carriage House and Garage

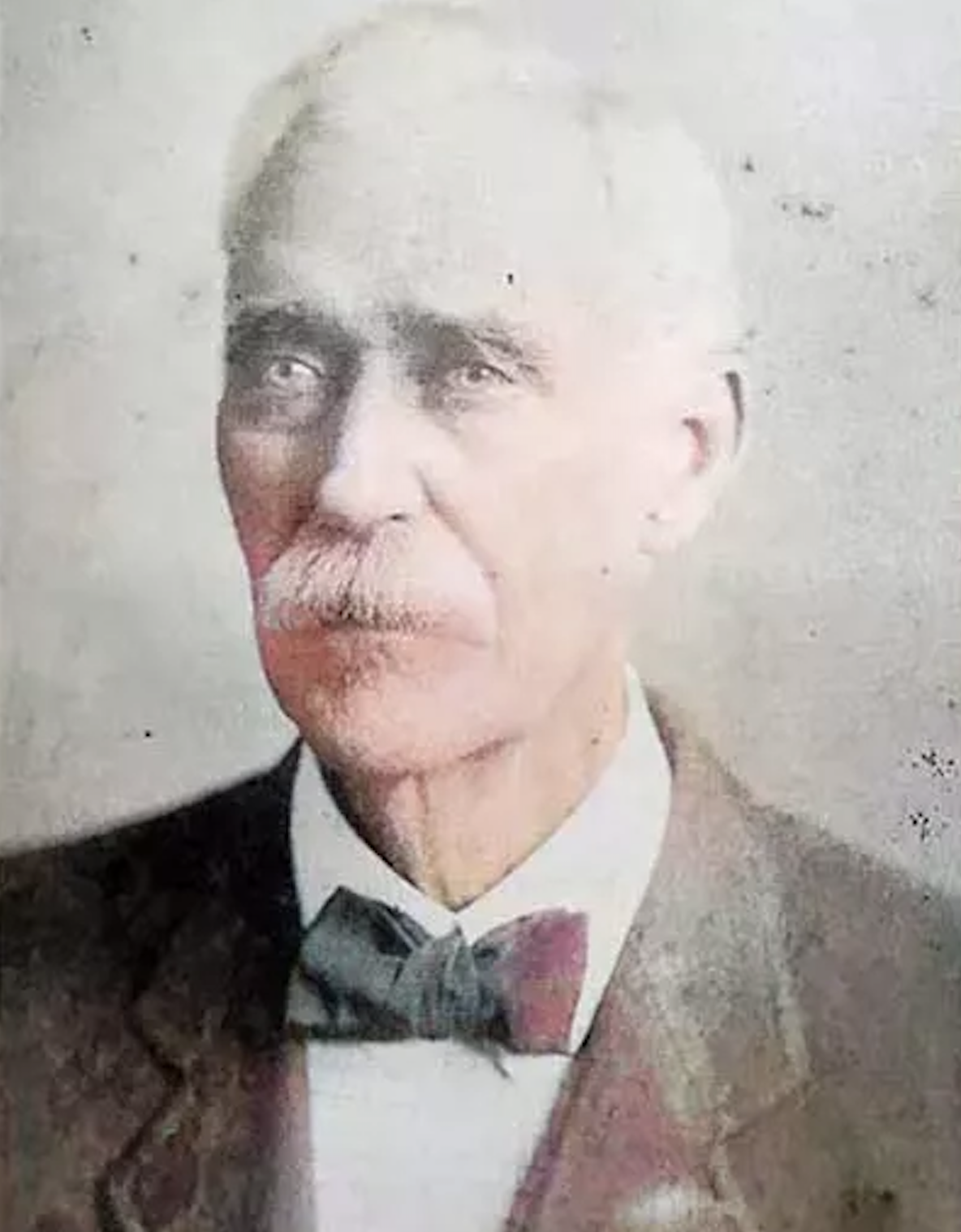
Capt. Jacob W. Cagle, Architect and Builder

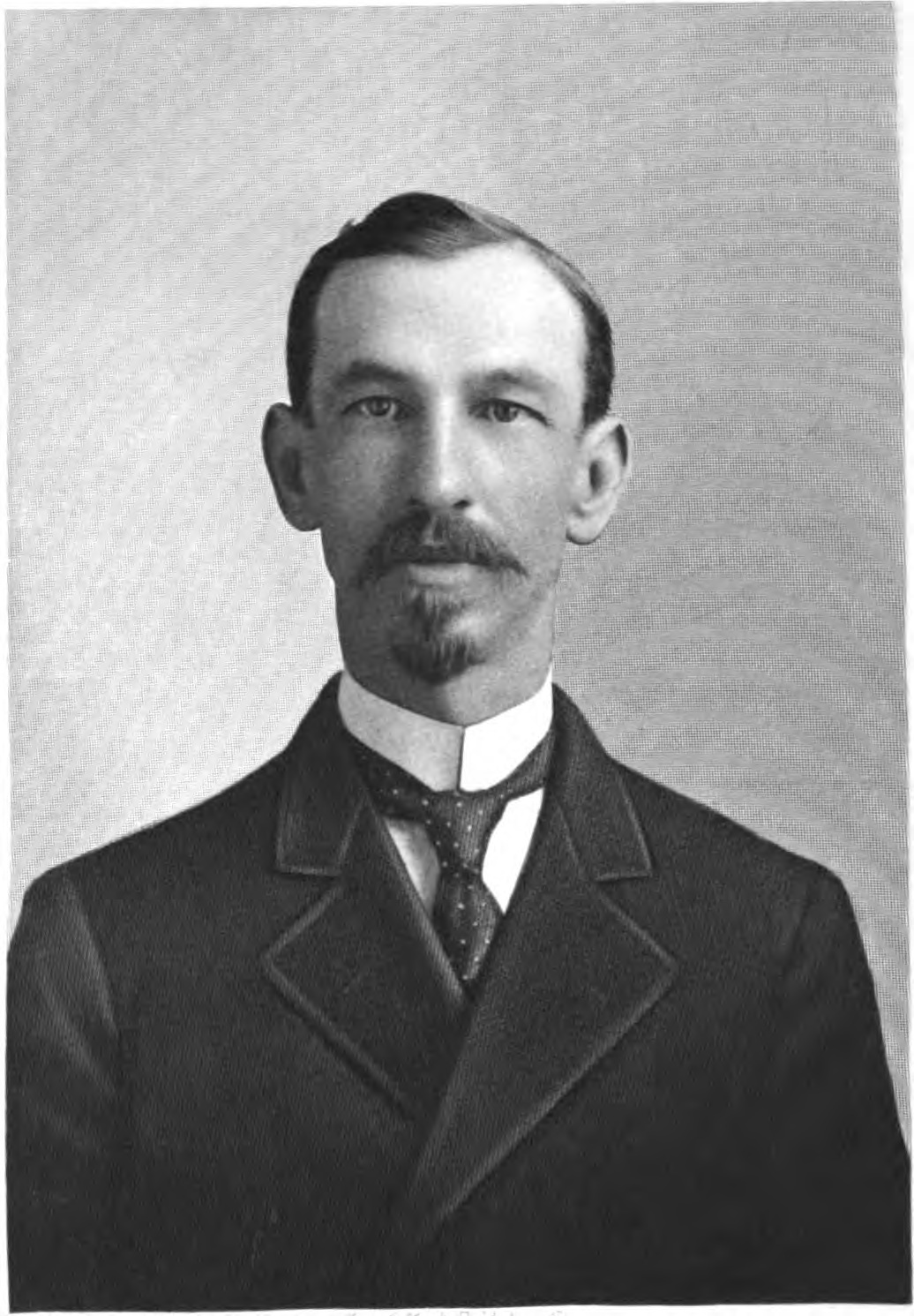
John Wilkins Norwood

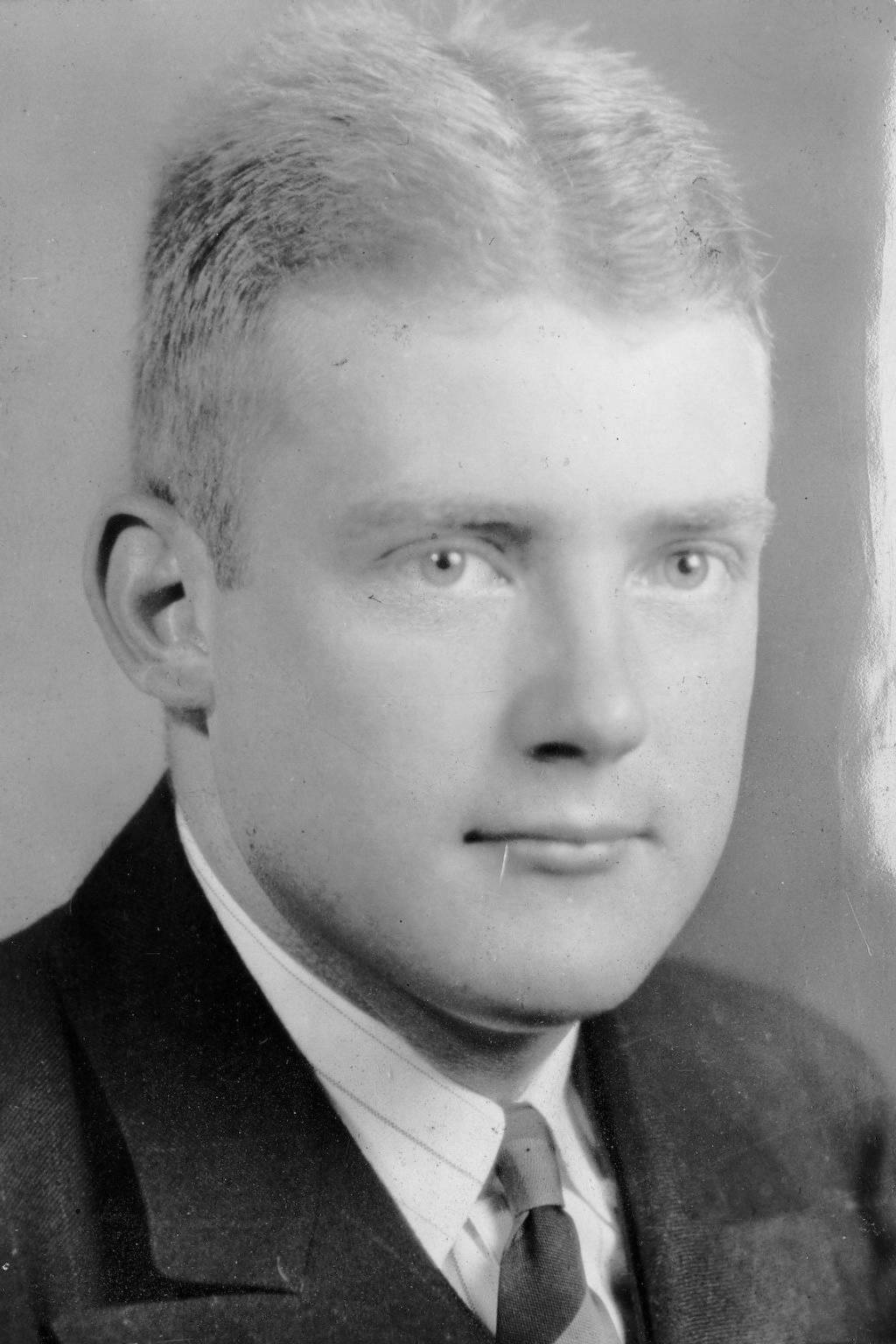
Claud Sapp Funderburk
