= Greenville Gas and Electric Light Company =

- U.S. National Register of Historic Places
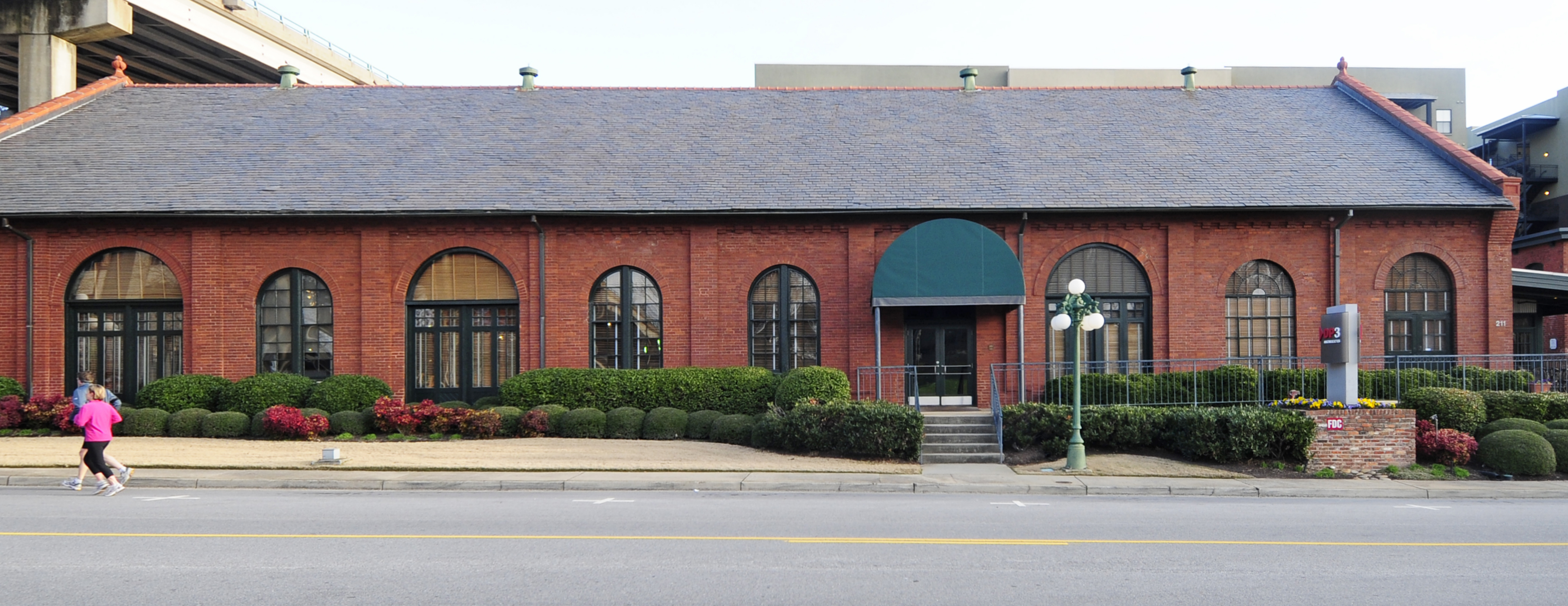
- Greenville Gas and Electric Company, February 2012

- Location within South Carolina Location within the United States
- Location: 211 E. Broad St., Greenville, South Carolina
- Coordinates: 34°50′47″N 82°23′47″W
- Area: 1.2 acres (0.49 ha)
- Built: 1890
- Architectural style: Vernacular Victorian
- MPS: Greenville MRA
- NRHP reference No.: 82003857
- Added to NRHP: July 1, 1982

Greenville Gas and Electric Light Company, also known as Duke Power Steam Plant, is a historic power plant located in Greenville, South Carolina. The two brick vernacular Victorian-style buildings were built around 1890. The larger building served as a coal-fueled, steam-powered electric generating plant and is a one-story, rectangular building with round-arched window and door openings. The second building is a two-story rectangular building originally used as offices for the power company. They were originally owned and operated by the Greenville Gas and Electric Light and Power Company, then sold in 1910 to a company that later evolved into Duke Power Company.

It was added to the National Register of Historic Places in 1982.
