= Stradley and Barr Dry Goods Store =

- U.S. National Register of Historic Places
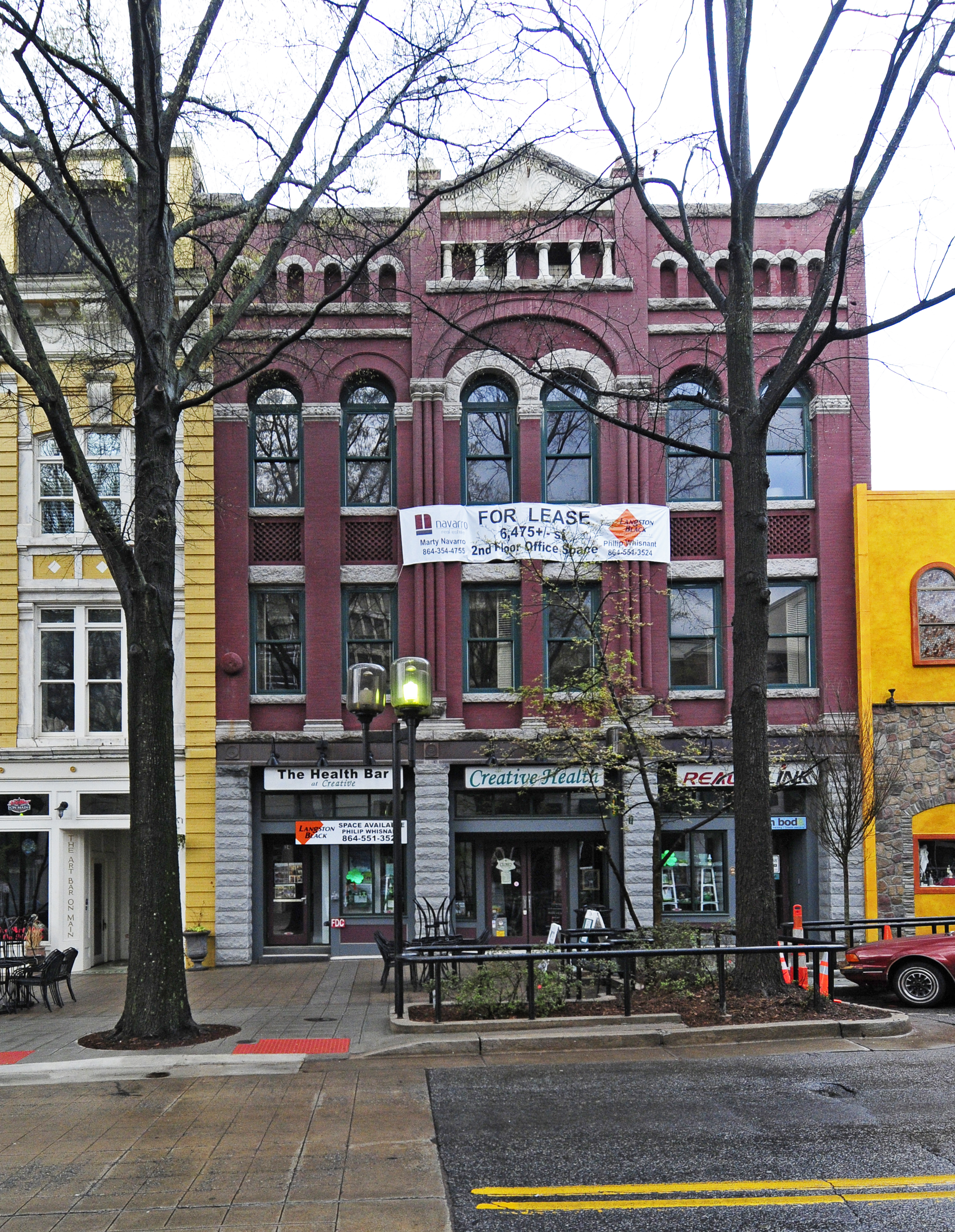

- Location within South Carolina Location within the United States
- Location: 14 S. Main St., Greenville, South Carolina
- Coordinates: 34°51′2″N 82°23′59″W
- NRHP reference No.: 07000099
- Added to NRHP: June 24, 2008

Stradley and Barr Dry Goods Store in Greenville, South Carolina was listed on the National Register of Historic Places in 2008.
