= E. W. Montgomery Cotton Warehouse =

- U.S. National Register of Historic Places
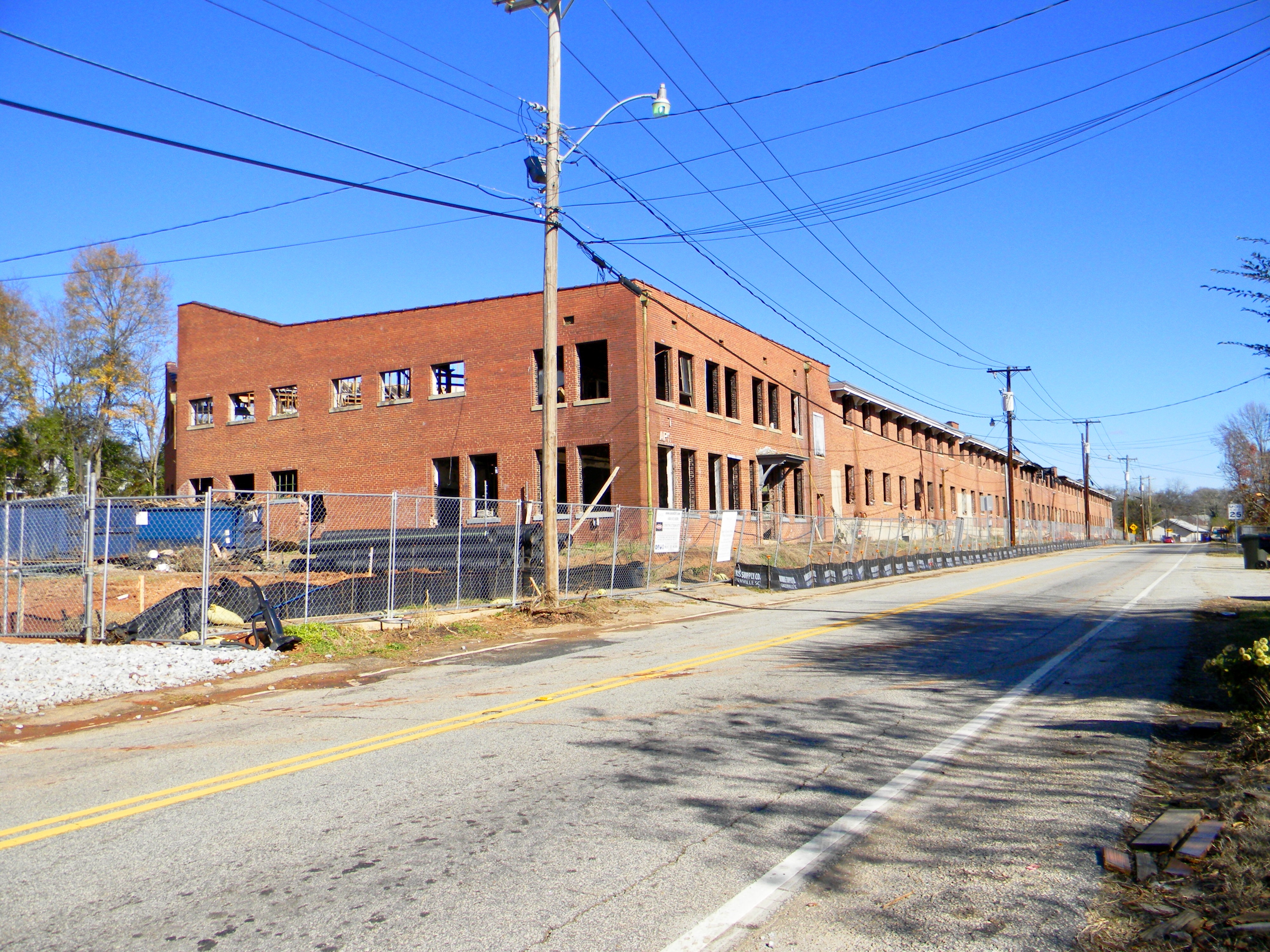

- Location within South Carolina Location within the United States
- Location: 806 Green Ave. Greenville, South Carolina
- Coordinates: 34°50′15″N 82°24′44″W
- Area: 2.41 acres (0.98 ha)
- Built: 1928, 1933
- NRHP reference No.: 12000371
- Added to NRHP: June 27, 2012

E. W. Montgomery Cotton Warehouse, also known as the Greenville Bonded Cotton Warehouse and now the Elements West Apartments, is a historic cotton warehouse located in Greenville, South Carolina. The original section was built about 1928. Following the property's purchase in 1933 by Edmund Warren Montgomery, a significant cotton merchant and broker in upstate South Carolina from the early-to-mid-20th century, three additions were completed. The two-story, brick building measures 553 feet long and 60 feet deep, and has 68,000 square feet in seven bays.

It was added to the National Register of Historic Places in 2012.
