= C. Granville Wyche House =

Historic house in South Carolina, United States

- U.S. National Register of Historic Places
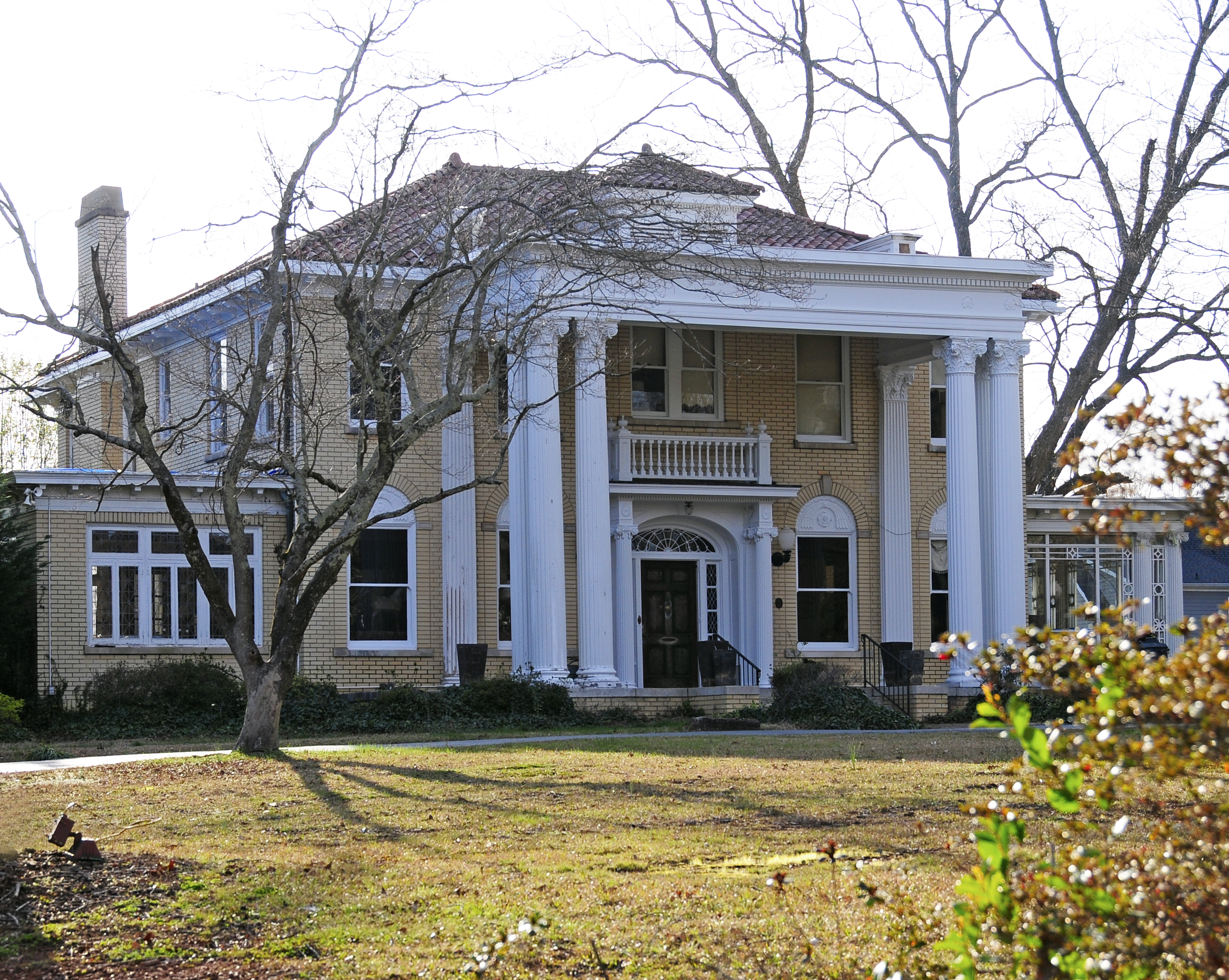
- C. Granville Wyche Home, March 2012

- Location within South Carolina Location within the United States
- Location: 2900 Augusta Rd., Greenville, South Carolina
- Coordinates: 34°48′46″N 82°23′3″W
- Area: 5.2 acres (2.1 ha)
- Built: 1931
- Architects: Trowbridge, Silas D.
- Architectural style: Renaissance
- NRHP reference No.: 93000904
- Added to NRHP: September 2, 1993

C. Granville Wyche House is a historic home located at Greenville, South Carolina. It was built in 1931, and consists of a two-story, five bay central blocked flanked by one-story balconied projections. It is of blond brick in the Italian Renaissance style with a low-pitched tile roof, wide eaves with brackets, and full-length, first floor windows. It features a massive portico with grouped classical columns and pilasters. Also on the property is a small grotto and an unpainted barn dating from the mid-1930s.

It was added to the National Register of Historic Places in 1993.

The house is now home to the Chandler School, an independent school for children in Kindergarten through eighth grade with dyslexia and other learning differences.
