= Hugh Aiken House =

Historic house in South Carolina, United States

- U.S. National Register of Historic Places
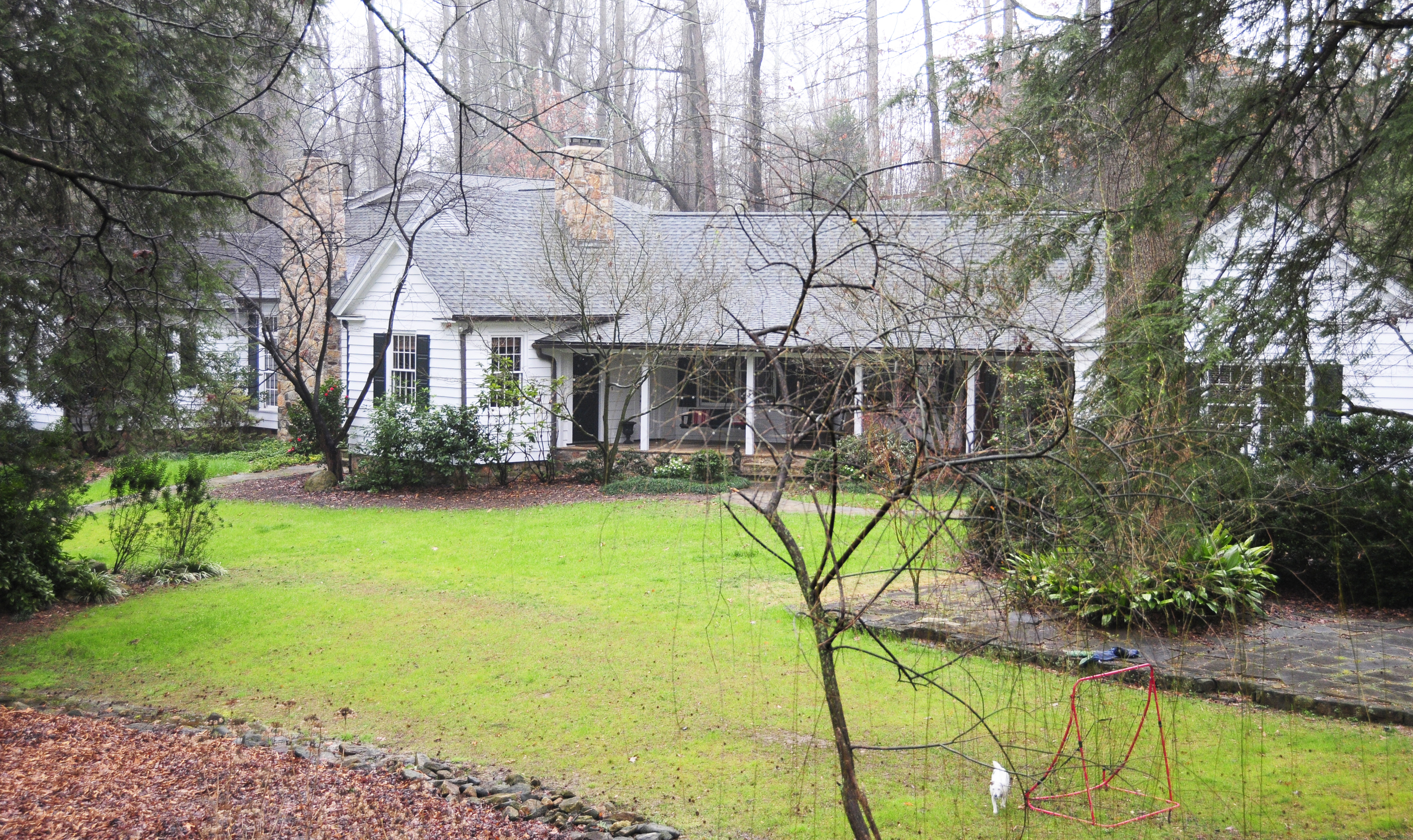
- Hugh Aiken House, February 2012

- Location within South Carolina Location within the United States
- Location: 1 Parkside Dr., Greenville, South Carolina
- Coordinates: 34°52′36″N 82°23′26″W
- Area: 4.9 acres (2.0 ha)
- Built: 1952
- Architect: Ward, William Riddle
- Architectural style: Colonial Revival
- NRHP reference No.: 03000207
- Added to NRHP: April 11, 2003

Hugh Aiken House is a historic home located at Greenville, South Carolina. It was designed in 1948, by noted Greenville architect William Riddle Ward and built in 1952. It is a 1 1/2-story frame residence in the Colonial Revival style. A large, tapered stone chimney dominates the front elevation of the house. The property features an extensively landscaped lot that is a heavily wooded, natural setting with falling topography and natural springs.

It was added to the National Register of Historic Places in 2003.
