= Cherrydale (Greenville, South Carolina) =

- Formerly listed on the U.S. National Register of Historic Places
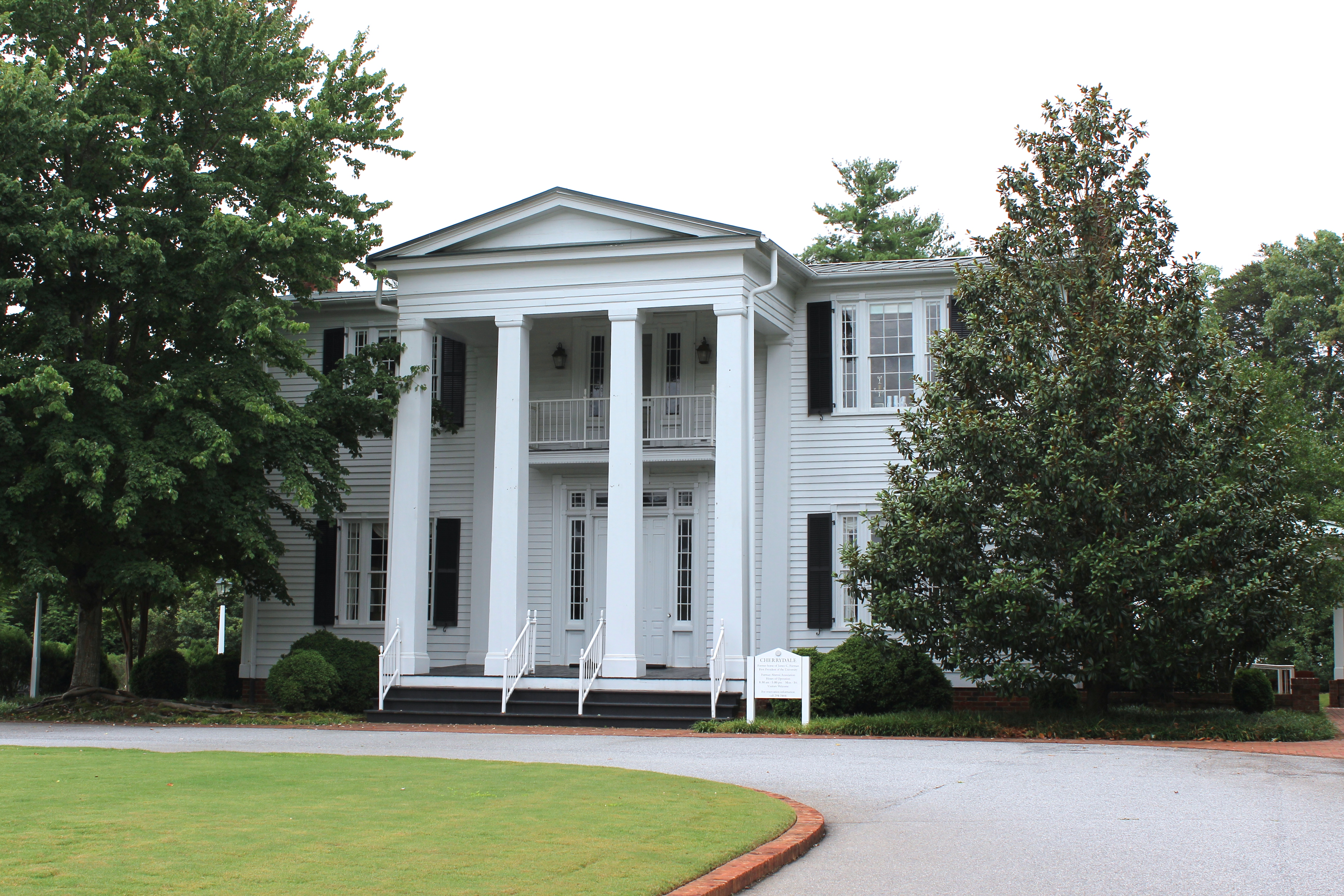
- Cherrydale in its new location
- Location: 1500 Poinsett Hwy., Greenville, South Carolina
- Area: 20 acres (8.1 ha)
- Built: 1840
- Architectural style: Greek Revival
- NRHP reference No.: 76001702

Significant dates
- Added to NRHP: June 17, 1976
- Removed from NRHP: December 8, 2005

Cherrydale is a historic house in Greenville County, South Carolina, United States, which serves as headquarters for the Furman University alumni association and as a venue for small dinners and receptions. It is a 4,960 square-foot, two-story building, with eleven rooms, eight fireplaces, and five bathrooms.

Mostly likely between 1852 and 1857, one George Washington Green built a modest, one-story farmhouse—now the rear wing of Cherrydale—at the foot of Piney Mountain in Greenville County. In 1857 Green sold the house and surrounding acreage to James Clement Furman (1809-1891), a Baptist clergyman and first president of Furman University, a school named for his father. Before 1860, Furman and his wife, Mary Glen Davis Furman, extensively remodeled the house, adding four rooms and a new entrance with a front porch, four Greek-Revival-style columns, and a three-bay portico. The Furmans eventually named the renovated house "Cherrydale," though Greenvillians also called it Furman Hall. During the 1860s the house was surrounded by a 1,200 acre plantation that grew corn, cotton, peaches, apples, and cherries and which served as the primary source of Furman's income during the Civil War.

After the death of Mary Furman in 1911, ownership passed to the Furman children. Mamie Furman Goldsmith lived there until the mid-1930s, after which it was used to store farm equipment. In 1939 Goldsmith sold the house to prominent textile manufacturer Eugene E. Stone III (1916-2004), who intended to demolish it before putting up a clothing manufacturing plant. His wife, Allene Wyman "Linky" Stone (1912-1998), persuaded him instead to restore and modernize the house, which was in poor condition and lacked plumbing, central heating, and electricity.

After Stone had acquired Umbro International, he extensively renovated Cherrydale in 1997 for use as a corporate guest house. The following year Umbro closed all its U. S. manufacturing operations, and the shopping center developer AIG Baker purchased the Cherrydale property. The Stones then donated Cherrydale to Furman University. On March 7–8, 1999, the university (after overcoming significant logistical problems) moved the house more than three miles north to its campus off Poinsett Highway (U.S. 276).

Cherrydale was added to the National Register of Historic Places on June 17, 1976; but following the relocation, it was removed on December 8, 2005. Although the National Register generally excludes structures moved from their original locations, the Greenville County Historic Preservation Commission has argued that Cherrydale satisfies an exemption for structures moved after their period of historic significance and that Cherrydale retains "a high degree of architectural integrity."
