= South Carolina's congressional delegations =

Since 2023

These are tables of congressional delegations from South Carolina to the United States House of Representatives and the United States Senate.

The current dean of the South Carolina delegation is Representative Jim Clyburn (SC-6), having served in the House since 1993.

== U.S. House of Representatives ==
=== Current members ===
The current U.S. House delegation from South Carolina has 7 members, including 6 Republicans and 1 Democrat.

District	Member (Residence)	Party	Incumbent since	CPVI	District map
1st	Nancy Mace (Charleston)	Republican	January 3, 2021	R+6	
2nd	Joe Wilson (Springdale)	Republican	December 18, 2001	R+7	
3rd	Sheri Biggs (Salem)	Republican	January 3, 2025	R+21	
4th	William Timmons (Greenville)	Republican	January 3, 2019	R+11	
5th	Ralph Norman (Rock Hill)	Republican	June 20, 2017	R+11	
6th	Jim Clyburn (Columbia)	Democratic	January 3, 1993	D+13	
7th	Russell Fry (Murrells Inlet)	Republican	January 3, 2023	R+12	

=== Historic representation ===
==== 1789–1803 ====
Congress	1st district	2nd district	3rd district	4th district	5th district	6th district
1st (1789–1791)	William Loughton; Smith (PA)	Aedanus Burke (AA)	Daniel Huger (PA)	Thomas Sumter (AA)	Thomas Tudor; Tucker (AA)	6th district
2nd (1791–1793)	William Loughton; Smith (PA)	Robert Barnwell (PA)	Daniel Huger (PA)	Thomas Sumter (AA)	Thomas Tudor; Tucker (AA)	6th district
3rd (1793–1795)	William Loughton; Smith (PA)	John Hunter (AA)	Lemuel Benton (AA)	Richard Winn (AA)	Alexander Gillon (AA)	Andrew Pickens (AA)
3rd (1793–1795)	William Loughton; Smith (PA)	John Hunter (AA)	Lemuel Benton (AA)	Richard Winn (AA)	Robert Goodloe; Harper (PA)	Andrew Pickens (AA)
4th (1795–1797)	William Loughton; Smith (F)	Wade Hampton I (DR)	Lemuel Benton (DR)	Richard Winn (DR)	Robert Goodloe; Harper (F)	Samuel Earle (DR)
5th (1797–1799)	William Loughton; Smith (F)	John Rutledge Jr. (F)	Lemuel Benton (DR)	Thomas Sumter (DR)	Robert Goodloe; Harper (F)	William Smith (DR)
5th (1797–1799)	Thomas Pinckney (F)	John Rutledge Jr. (F)	Lemuel Benton (DR)	Thomas Sumter (DR)	Robert Goodloe; Harper (F)	William Smith (DR)
6th (1799–1801)	Thomas Pinckney (F)	John Rutledge Jr. (F)	Benjamin Huger (F)	Thomas Sumter (DR)	Robert Goodloe; Harper (F)	Abraham Nott (F)
7th (1801–1803)	Thomas Lowndes (F)	John Rutledge Jr. (F)	Benjamin Huger (F)	Thomas Sumter (DR)	William Butler (DR)	Thomas Moore (DR)
7th (1801–1803)	Thomas Lowndes (F)	John Rutledge Jr. (F)	Benjamin Huger (F)	Richard Winn (DR)	William Butler (DR)	Thomas Moore (DR)

==== 1803–1813 ====
Congress	District							
Congress	1st	2nd	3rd	4th	5th	6th	7th	8th
8th (1803–1805)	Thomas Lowndes (F)	William; Butler (DR)	Benjamin Huger (F)	Wade Hampton I (DR)	Richard; Winn (DR)	Levi Casey (DR)	Thomas; Moore (DR)	John B. Earle (DR)
9th (1805–1807)	Robert Marion (DR)	William; Butler (DR)	David R. Williams (DR)	O'Brien Smith (DR)	Richard; Winn (DR)	Levi Casey (DR)	Thomas; Moore (DR)	Elias Earle (DR)
10th (1807–1809)	Robert Marion (DR)	William; Butler (DR)	David R. Williams (DR)	John Taylor (DR)	Richard; Winn (DR)	Joseph Calhoun (DR)	Thomas; Moore (DR)	Lemuel J. Alston (DR)
11th (1809–1811)	Robert Marion (DR)	William; Butler (DR)	Robert Witherspoon (DR)	John Taylor (DR)	Richard; Winn (DR)	Joseph Calhoun (DR)	Thomas; Moore (DR)	Lemuel J. Alston (DR)
11th (1809–1811)	Langdon; Cheves (DR)	William; Butler (DR)	Robert Witherspoon (DR)	John Taylor (DR)	Richard; Winn (DR)	Joseph Calhoun (DR)	Thomas; Moore (DR)	Lemuel J. Alston (DR)
12th (1811–1813)	Langdon; Cheves (DR)	William; Butler (DR)	David Rogerson Williams (DR)	William Lowndes (DR)	Richard; Winn (DR)	John C. Calhoun (DR)	Thomas; Moore (DR)	Elias Earle (DR)

==== 1813–1843 ====
Congress	District								
Congress	1st	2nd	3rd	4th	5th	6th	7th	8th	9th
13th (1813–1815)	Langdon Cheves (DR)	William Lowndes (DR)	Theodore Gourdin (DR)	John J. Chappell (DR)	David R. Evans (DR)	John C. Calhoun (DR)	Elias Earle (DR)	Samuel Farrow (DR)	John Kershaw (DR)
14th (1815–1817)	Henry Middleton (DR)	William Lowndes (DR)	Benjamin Huger (F)	John J. Chappell (DR)	William; Woodward (DR)	John C. Calhoun (DR)	John Taylor (DR)	Thomas Moore (DR)	William Mayrant (DR)
14th (1815–1817)	Henry Middleton (DR)	William Lowndes (DR)	Benjamin Huger (F)	John J. Chappell (DR)	William; Woodward (DR)	John C. Calhoun (DR)	John Taylor (DR)	Thomas Moore (DR)	Stephen Decatur; Miller (DR)
15th (1817–1819)	Henry Middleton (DR)	William Lowndes (DR)	James Ervin (DR)	Joseph Bellinger (DR)	Starling Tucker (DR)	John C. Calhoun (DR)	Elias Earle (DR)	Wilson Nesbitt (DR)	Stephen Decatur; Miller (DR)
15th (1817–1819)	Henry Middleton (DR)	William Lowndes (DR)	James Ervin (DR)	Joseph Bellinger (DR)	Starling Tucker (DR)	Eldred Simkins (DR)	Elias Earle (DR)	Wilson Nesbitt (DR)	Stephen Decatur; Miller (DR)
16th (1819–1821)	Charles Pinckney (DR)	William Lowndes (DR)	James Ervin (DR)	James Overstreet (DR)	Starling Tucker (DR)	Eldred Simkins (DR)	Elias Earle (DR)	John McCreary (DR)	Joseph Brevard (DR)
17th (1821–1823)	Joel Roberts; Poinsett (DR) (Note: Supported the Jackson faction in the 1824 United States presidential election)	William Lowndes (DR)	Thomas R. Mitchell (DR)	James Overstreet (DR)	Starling Tucker (DR)	George McDuffie (DR)	John Wilson (DR)	Joseph Gist (DR)	James Blair (DR)
17th (1821–1823)	Joel Roberts; Poinsett (DR)	James; Hamilton Jr. (DR)	Thomas R. Mitchell (DR)	Andrew R. Govan (DR)	Starling Tucker (DR)	George McDuffie (DR)	John Wilson (DR)	Joseph Gist (DR)	John Carter (DR)
18th (1823–1825)	Joel Roberts; Poinsett (DR)	James; Hamilton Jr. (DR)	Robert B. Campbell (DR)	Andrew R. Govan (DR)	George; McDuffie (DR)	John Wilson (DR)	Joseph Gist (DR)	John Carter (DR)	Starling; Tucker (DR)
19th (1825–1827)	William Drayton (J)	James Hamilton Jr. (J)	Thomas R. Mitchell (J)	Andrew R. Govan (J)	George McDuffie (J)	John Wilson (J)	Joseph Gist (J)	John Carter (J)	Starling Tucker (J)
20th (1827–1829)	William Drayton (J)	James Hamilton Jr. (J)	Thomas R. Mitchell (J)	William D. Martin (J)	George McDuffie (J)	Warren R. Davis (J)	William T. Nuckolls (J)	John Carter (J)	Starling Tucker (J)
21st (1829–1831)	William Drayton (J)	Robert Woodeard; Barnwell (J)	John Campbell (J)	William D. Martin (J)	George McDuffie (J)	Warren R. Davis (J)	William T. Nuckolls (J)	James Blair (J)	Starling Tucker (J)
22nd (1831–1833)	William Drayton (J)	Robert Woodward; Barnwell (N)	Thomas R. Mitchell (J)	John Myers; Felder (J)	George McDuffie (J)	Warren R. Davis (N)	William T. Nuckolls (J)	James Blair (J)	John K. Griffin (N)
23rd (1833–1835)	Henry L. Pinckney (N)	William J. Grayson (N)	Thomas D. Singleton (N)	John Myers; Felder (N)	George McDuffie (J)	Warren R. Davis (N)	William K. Clowney (N)	James Blair (J)	John K. Griffin (N)
23rd (1833–1835)	Henry L. Pinckney (N)	William J. Grayson (N)	Robert B. Campbell (N)	John Myers; Felder (N)	Francis Wilkinson; Pickens (N)	Warren R. Davis (N)	William K. Clowney (N)	Richard Irving; Manning I (J)	John K. Griffin (N)
24th (1835–1837)	Henry L. Pinckney (N)	William J. Grayson (N)	Robert B. Campbell (N)	James H. Hammond (N)	Francis Wilkinson; Pickens (N)	Waddy; Thompson Jr. (NR)	James Rogers (J)	Richard Irving; Manning I (J)	John K. Griffin (N)
24th (1835–1837)	Henry L. Pinckney (N)	William J. Grayson (N)	Robert B. Campbell (N)	Franklin H. Elmore (SR/D)	Francis Wilkinson; Pickens (N)	Waddy; Thompson Jr. (NR)	James Rogers (J)	John Peter; Richardson II (J)	John K. Griffin (N)
25th (1837–1839)	Hugh S. Legaré (D)	Robert Barnwell; Rhett (D)	John Campbell (N)	Franklin H. Elmore (SR/D)	Francis Wilkinson; Pickens (N)	Waddy; Thompson Jr. (W)	William K. Clowney (N)	John Peter; Richardson II (D)	John K. Griffin (N)
26th (1839–1841)	Isaac E. Holmes (D)	Robert Barnwell; Rhett (D)	John Campbell (D)	Sampson H. Butler (D)	Francis Wilkinson; Pickens (D)	Waddy; Thompson Jr. (W)	James Rogers (D)	Thomas De Lage; Sumter (D)	John K. Griffin (D)
27th (1841–1843)	Isaac E. Holmes (D)	Robert Barnwell; Rhett (D)	John Campbell (D)	Sampson H. Butler (D)	Francis Wilkinson; Pickens (D)	William Butler (W)	James Rogers (D)	Thomas De Lage; Sumter (D)	Patrick C. Caldwell (D)
27th (1841–1843)	Isaac E. Holmes (D)	Robert Barnwell; Rhett (D)	John Campbell (D)	Samuel W. Trotti (D)	Francis Wilkinson; Pickens (D)	William Butler (W)	James Rogers (D)	Thomas De Lage; Sumter (D)	Patrick C. Caldwell (D)

==== 1843–1853 ====
Congress	District						
Congress	1st	2nd	3rd	4th	5th	6th	7th
28th (1843–1845)	James A. Black (D)	Richard F. Simpson (D)	Joseph A. Woodward (D)	John Campbell (D)	Armistead; Burt (D)	Isaac E. Holmes (D)	Robert; Barnwell; Rhett (D)
29th (1845–1847)	James A. Black (D)	Richard F. Simpson (D)	Joseph A. Woodward (D)	Alexander D. Sims (D)	Armistead; Burt (D)	Isaac E. Holmes (D)	Robert; Barnwell; Rhett (D)
30th (1847–1849)	James A. Black (D)	Richard F. Simpson (D)	Joseph A. Woodward (D)	Alexander D. Sims (D)	Armistead; Burt (D)	Isaac E. Holmes (D)	Robert; Barnwell; Rhett (D)
30th (1847–1849)	Daniel; Wallace (D)	Richard F. Simpson (D)	Joseph A. Woodward (D)	John McQueen (D)	Armistead; Burt (D)	Isaac E. Holmes (D)	Robert; Barnwell; Rhett (D)
31st (1849–1851)	Daniel; Wallace (D)	James Lawrence; Orr (D)	Joseph A. Woodward (D)	John McQueen (D)	Armistead; Burt (D)	Isaac E. Holmes (D)	William F. Colcock (D)
32nd (1851–1853)	Daniel; Wallace (D)	James Lawrence; Orr (D)	Joseph A. Woodward (D)	John McQueen (D)	Armistead; Burt (D)	William Aiken (D)	William F. Colcock (D)

==== 1853–1863 ====
Congress	1st district	2nd district	3rd district	4th district	5th district	6th district
33rd (1853–1855)	John; McQueen (D)	William; Aiken (D)	Laurence M. Keitt (D)	Preston; Brooks (D)	James Lawrence; Orr (D)	William W. Boyce (D)
34th (1855–1857)	John; McQueen (D)	William; Aiken (D)	Laurence M. Keitt (D)	Preston; Brooks (D)	James Lawrence; Orr (D)	William W. Boyce (D)
35th (1857–1859)	John; McQueen (D)	William Porcher; Miles (D)	Laurence M. Keitt (D)	Milledge Luke; Bonham (D)	James Lawrence; Orr (D)	William W. Boyce (D)
36th (1859–1861)	John; McQueen (D)	William Porcher; Miles (D)	Laurence M. Keitt (D)	Milledge Luke; Bonham (D)	John D. Ashmore (D)	William W. Boyce (D)
36th (1859–1861)	American Civil War					
37th (1861–1863)	American Civil War					

==== 1863–1883 ====
Congress	1st district	2nd district	3rd district	4th district	At-large
38–39th (1863–1867)	American Civil War				At-large
40th (1867–1869)	American Civil War				At-large
40th (1867–1869)	B. F. Whittemore (R)	Christopher; C. Bowen (R)	Manuel S. Corley (R)	James H. Goss (R)	At-large
41st (1869–1871)	B. F. Whittemore (R)	Christopher; C. Bowen (R)	Solomon L. Hoge (R)	Alexander S. Wallace (R)	At-large
41st (1869–1871)	Joseph Rainey (R)	Christopher; C. Bowen (R)	Solomon L. Hoge (R)	Alexander S. Wallace (R)	At-large
42nd (1871–1873)	Joseph Rainey (R)	Robert C. De Large (R)	Robert B. Elliott (R)	Alexander S. Wallace (R)	At-large
43rd (1873–1875)	Joseph Rainey (R)	Alonzo J. Ransier (R)	Robert B. Elliott (R)	Alexander S. Wallace (R)	Richard H. Cain (R)
43rd (1873–1875)	Joseph Rainey (R)	Alonzo J. Ransier (R)	Lewis C. Carpenter (R)	Alexander S. Wallace (R)	Richard H. Cain (R)
44th (1875–1877)	Joseph Rainey (R)	Edmund W. M. Mackey (IR)	Solomon L. Hoge (R)	Alexander S. Wallace (R)	5th district
44th (1875–1877)	Joseph Rainey (R)	Edmund W. M. Mackey (IR)	Solomon L. Hoge (R)	Alexander S. Wallace (R)	Robert Smalls (R)
44th (1875–1877)	Joseph Rainey (R)	Charles W. Buttz (R)	Solomon L. Hoge (R)	Alexander S. Wallace (R)	Robert Smalls (R)
45th (1877–1879)	Joseph Rainey (R)	Richard H. Cain (R)	D. Wyatt Aiken (D)	John H. Evins (D)	Robert Smalls (R)
46th (1879–1881)	John S. Richardson (D)	Michael P. O'Connor (D)	D. Wyatt Aiken (D)	John H. Evins (D)	George D. Tillman (D)
47th (1881–1883)	John S. Richardson (D)	Samuel Dibble (D)	D. Wyatt Aiken (D)	John H. Evins (D)	George D. Tillman (D)
47th (1881–1883)	John S. Richardson (D)	Edmund W. M. Mackey (R)	D. Wyatt Aiken (D)	John H. Evins (D)	Robert Smalls (R)

==== 1883–1933 ====
Congress	1st district	2nd district	3rd district	4th district	5th district	6th district	7th district
48th (1883–1885)	Samuel Dibble (D)	George D. Tillman (D)	D. Wyatt Aiken (D)	John H. Evins (D)	John J. Hemphill (D)	George W. Dargan (D)	E. W. M. Mackey (R)
48th (1883–1885)	Samuel Dibble (D)	George D. Tillman (D)	D. Wyatt Aiken (D)	John Bratton (D)	John J. Hemphill (D)	George W. Dargan (D)	Robert Smalls (R)
49th (1885–1887)	Samuel Dibble (D)	George D. Tillman (D)	D. Wyatt Aiken (D)	William H. Perry (D)	John J. Hemphill (D)	George W. Dargan (D)	Robert Smalls (R)
50th (1887–1889)	Samuel Dibble (D)	George D. Tillman (D)	James S. Cothran (D)	William H. Perry (D)	John J. Hemphill (D)	George W. Dargan (D)	William Elliott (D)
51st (1889–1891)	Samuel Dibble (D)	George D. Tillman (D)	James S. Cothran (D)	William H. Perry (D)	John J. Hemphill (D)	George W. Dargan (D)	Thomas E. Miller (R)
52nd (1891–1893)	William H. Brawley (D)	George D. Tillman (D)	George Johnstone (D)	George W. Shell (D)	John J. Hemphill (D)	Eli T. Stackhouse (D)	William Elliott (D)
53rd (1893–1895)	William H. Brawley (D)	W. Jasper Talbert (D)	Asbury Latimer (D)	George W. Shell (D)	Thomas J. Strait (D)	John L. McLaurin (D)	George W. Murray (R)
53rd (1893–1895)	James F. Izlar (D)	W. Jasper Talbert (D)	Asbury Latimer (D)	George W. Shell (D)	Thomas J. Strait (D)	John L. McLaurin (D)	George W. Murray (R)
54th (1895–1897)	William Elliott (D)	W. Jasper Talbert (D)	Asbury Latimer (D)	Stanyarne Wilson (D)	Thomas J. Strait (D)	John L. McLaurin (D)	J. William Stokes (D)
54th (1895–1897)	George W. Murray (R)	W. Jasper Talbert (D)	Asbury Latimer (D)	Stanyarne Wilson (D)	Thomas J. Strait (D)	John L. McLaurin (D)	J. William Stokes (D)
55th (1897–1899)	William Elliott (D)	W. Jasper Talbert (D)	Asbury Latimer (D)	Stanyarne Wilson (D)	Thomas J. Strait (D)	James Norton (D)	J. William Stokes (D)
56th (1899–1901)	William Elliott (D)	W. Jasper Talbert (D)	Asbury Latimer (D)	Stanyarne Wilson (D)	David E. Finley (D)	James Norton (D)	J. William Stokes (D)
57th (1901–1903)	William Elliott (D)	W. Jasper Talbert (D)	Asbury Latimer (D)	Joseph T. Johnson (D)	David E. Finley (D)	Robert B. Scarborough (D)	A. Frank; Lever (D)
58th (1903–1905)	George Swinton; Legaré (D)	George W. Croft (D)	Wyatt Aiken (D)	Joseph T. Johnson (D)	David E. Finley (D)	Robert B. Scarborough (D)	A. Frank; Lever (D)
58th (1903–1905)	George Swinton; Legaré (D)	Theodore G. Croft (D)	Wyatt Aiken (D)	Joseph T. Johnson (D)	David E. Finley (D)	Robert B. Scarborough (D)	A. Frank; Lever (D)
59th (1905–1907)	George Swinton; Legaré (D)	James O. Patterson (D)	Wyatt Aiken (D)	Joseph T. Johnson (D)	David E. Finley (D)	J. Edwin Ellerbe (D)	A. Frank; Lever (D)
60th (1907–1909)	George Swinton; Legaré (D)	James O. Patterson (D)	Wyatt Aiken (D)	Joseph T. Johnson (D)	David E. Finley (D)	J. Edwin Ellerbe (D)	A. Frank; Lever (D)
61st (1909–1911)	George Swinton; Legaré (D)	James O. Patterson (D)	Wyatt Aiken (D)	Joseph T. Johnson (D)	David E. Finley (D)	J. Edwin Ellerbe (D)	A. Frank; Lever (D)
62nd (1911–1913)	George Swinton; Legaré (D)	James F. Byrnes (D)	Wyatt Aiken (D)	Joseph T. Johnson (D)	David E. Finley (D)	J. Edwin Ellerbe (D)	A. Frank; Lever (D)
63rd (1913–1915)	Richard S. Whaley (D)	James F. Byrnes (D)	Wyatt Aiken (D)	Joseph T. Johnson (D)	David E. Finley (D)	J. Willard; Ragsdale (D)	A. Frank; Lever (D)
64th (1915–1917)	Richard S. Whaley (D)	James F. Byrnes (D)	Wyatt Aiken (D)	Samuel J. Nicholls (D)	Paul G. McCorkle (D)	J. Willard; Ragsdale (D)	A. Frank; Lever (D)
65th (1917–1919)	Richard S. Whaley (D)	James F. Byrnes (D)	Frederick H. Dominick (D)	Samuel J. Nicholls (D)	William Francis; Stevenson (D)	J. Willard; Ragsdale (D)	A. Frank; Lever (D)
66th (1919–1921)	Richard S. Whaley (D)	James F. Byrnes (D)	Frederick H. Dominick (D)	Samuel J. Nicholls (D)	William Francis; Stevenson (D)	Philip H. Stoll (D)	Edward C. Mann (D)
67th (1921–1923)	W. Turner Logan (D)	James F. Byrnes (D)	Frederick H. Dominick (D)	John J. McSwain (D)	William Francis; Stevenson (D)	Philip H. Stoll (D)	Hampton P. Fulmer (D)
68th (1923–1925)	W. Turner Logan (D)	James F. Byrnes (D)	Frederick H. Dominick (D)	John J. McSwain (D)	William Francis; Stevenson (D)	Allard H. Gasque (D)	Hampton P. Fulmer (D)
69th (1925–1927)	Thomas S. McMillan (D)	Butler B. Hare (D)	Frederick H. Dominick (D)	John J. McSwain (D)	William Francis; Stevenson (D)	Allard H. Gasque (D)	Hampton P. Fulmer (D)
70th (1927–1929)	Thomas S. McMillan (D)	Butler B. Hare (D)	Frederick H. Dominick (D)	John J. McSwain (D)	William Francis; Stevenson (D)	Allard H. Gasque (D)	Hampton P. Fulmer (D)
71st (1929–1931)	Thomas S. McMillan (D)	Butler B. Hare (D)	Frederick H. Dominick (D)	John J. McSwain (D)	William Francis; Stevenson (D)	Allard H. Gasque (D)	Hampton P. Fulmer (D)
72nd (1931–1933)	Thomas S. McMillan (D)	Butler B. Hare (D)	Frederick H. Dominick (D)	John J. McSwain (D)	William Francis; Stevenson (D)	Allard H. Gasque (D)	Hampton P. Fulmer (D)

==== 1933–2013 ====
Congress	1st district	2nd district	3rd district	4th district	5th district	6th district
73rd (1933–1935)	Thomas S. McMillan (D)	Hampton P. Fulmer (D)	John C. Taylor (D)	John J. McSwain (D)	James P. Richards (D)	Allard H. Gasque (D)
74th (1935–1937)	Thomas S. McMillan (D)	Hampton P. Fulmer (D)	John C. Taylor (D)	John J. McSwain (D)	James P. Richards (D)	Allard H. Gasque (D)
74th (1935–1937)	Thomas S. McMillan (D)	Hampton P. Fulmer (D)	John C. Taylor (D)	Gabriel H. Mahon (D)	James P. Richards (D)	Allard H. Gasque (D)
75th (1937–1939)	Thomas S. McMillan (D)	Hampton P. Fulmer (D)	John C. Taylor (D)	Gabriel H. Mahon (D)	James P. Richards (D)	Allard H. Gasque (D)
75th (1937–1939)	Thomas S. McMillan (D)	Hampton P. Fulmer (D)	John C. Taylor (D)	Gabriel H. Mahon (D)	James P. Richards (D)	E. H. Gasque (D)
76th (1939–1941)	Thomas S. McMillan (D)	Hampton P. Fulmer (D)	Butler B. Hare (D)	Joseph R. Bryson (D)	James P. Richards (D)	John L. McMillan (D)
77th (1941–1943)	L. Mendel; Rivers (D)	Hampton P. Fulmer (D)	Butler B. Hare (D)	Joseph R. Bryson (D)	James P. Richards (D)	John L. McMillan (D)
78th (1943–1945)	L. Mendel; Rivers (D)	Hampton P. Fulmer (D)	Butler B. Hare (D)	Joseph R. Bryson (D)	James P. Richards (D)	John L. McMillan (D)
78th (1943–1945)	L. Mendel; Rivers (D)	Willa L. Fulmer (D)	Butler B. Hare (D)	Joseph R. Bryson (D)	James P. Richards (D)	John L. McMillan (D)
79th (1945–1947)	L. Mendel; Rivers (D)	John J. Riley (D)	Butler B. Hare (D)	Joseph R. Bryson (D)	James P. Richards (D)	John L. McMillan (D)
80th (1947–1949)	L. Mendel; Rivers (D)	John J. Riley (D)	W. J. Bryan Dorn (D)	Joseph R. Bryson (D)	James P. Richards (D)	John L. McMillan (D)
81st (1949–1951)	L. Mendel; Rivers (D)	Hugo S. Sims Jr. (D)	James B. Hare (D)	Joseph R. Bryson (D)	James P. Richards (D)	John L. McMillan (D)
82nd (1951–1953)	L. Mendel; Rivers (D)	John J. Riley (D)	W. J. Bryan; Dorn (D)	Joseph R. Bryson (D)	James P. Richards (D)	John L. McMillan (D)
83rd (1953–1955)	L. Mendel; Rivers (D)	John J. Riley (D)	W. J. Bryan; Dorn (D)	Joseph R. Bryson (D)	James P. Richards (D)	John L. McMillan (D)
84th (1955–1957)	L. Mendel; Rivers (D)	John J. Riley (D)	W. J. Bryan; Dorn (D)	Robert T. Ashmore (D)	James P. Richards (D)	John L. McMillan (D)
85th (1957–1959)	L. Mendel; Rivers (D)	John J. Riley (D)	W. J. Bryan; Dorn (D)	Robert T. Ashmore (D)	Robert W. Hemphill (D)	John L. McMillan (D)
86th (1959–1961)	L. Mendel; Rivers (D)	John J. Riley (D)	W. J. Bryan; Dorn (D)	Robert T. Ashmore (D)	Robert W. Hemphill (D)	John L. McMillan (D)
87th (1961–1963)	L. Mendel; Rivers (D)	John J. Riley (D)	W. J. Bryan; Dorn (D)	Robert T. Ashmore (D)	Robert W. Hemphill (D)	John L. McMillan (D)
87th (1961–1963)	L. Mendel; Rivers (D)	Corinne B. Riley (D)	W. J. Bryan; Dorn (D)	Robert T. Ashmore (D)	Robert W. Hemphill (D)	John L. McMillan (D)
88th (1963–1965)	L. Mendel; Rivers (D)	Albert Watson (D)	W. J. Bryan; Dorn (D)	Robert T. Ashmore (D)	Robert W. Hemphill (D)	John L. McMillan (D)
89th (1965–1967)	L. Mendel; Rivers (D)	Albert Watson (R)	W. J. Bryan; Dorn (D)	Robert T. Ashmore (D)	Thomas S. Gettys (D)	John L. McMillan (D)
90th (1967–1969)	L. Mendel; Rivers (D)	Albert Watson (R)	W. J. Bryan; Dorn (D)	Robert T. Ashmore (D)	Thomas S. Gettys (D)	John L. McMillan (D)
91st (1969–1971)	L. Mendel; Rivers (D)	Albert Watson (R)	W. J. Bryan; Dorn (D)	James Mann (D)	Thomas S. Gettys (D)	John L. McMillan (D)
92nd (1971–1973)	Mendel Jackson; Davis (D)	Floyd Spence (R)	W. J. Bryan; Dorn (D)	James Mann (D)	Thomas S. Gettys (D)	John L. McMillan (D)
93rd (1973–1975)	Mendel Jackson; Davis (D)	Floyd Spence (R)	W. J. Bryan; Dorn (D)	James Mann (D)	Thomas S. Gettys (D)	Ed Young (R)
94th (1975–1977)	Mendel Jackson; Davis (D)	Floyd Spence (R)	Butler Derrick (D)	James Mann (D)	Kenneth Lamar; Holland (D)	John Jenrette (D)
95th (1977–1979)	Mendel Jackson; Davis (D)	Floyd Spence (R)	Butler Derrick (D)	James Mann (D)	Kenneth Lamar; Holland (D)	John Jenrette (D)
96th (1979–1981)	Mendel Jackson; Davis (D)	Floyd Spence (R)	Butler Derrick (D)	Carroll A. Campbell Jr. (R)	Kenneth Lamar; Holland (D)	John Jenrette (D)
97th (1981–1983)	Thomas F. Hartnett (R)	Floyd Spence (R)	Butler Derrick (D)	Carroll A. Campbell Jr. (R)	Kenneth Lamar; Holland (D)	John L. Napier (R)
98th (1983–1985)	Thomas F. Hartnett (R)	Floyd Spence (R)	Butler Derrick (D)	Carroll A. Campbell Jr. (R)	John Spratt (D)	Robin Tallon (D)
99th (1985–1987)	Thomas F. Hartnett (R)	Floyd Spence (R)	Butler Derrick (D)	Carroll A. Campbell Jr. (R)	John Spratt (D)	Robin Tallon (D)
100th (1987–1989)	Arthur; Ravenel Jr. (R)	Floyd Spence (R)	Butler Derrick (D)	Liz J. Patterson (D)	John Spratt (D)	Robin Tallon (D)
101st (1989–1991)	Arthur; Ravenel Jr. (R)	Floyd Spence (R)	Butler Derrick (D)	Liz J. Patterson (D)	John Spratt (D)	Robin Tallon (D)
102nd (1991–1993)	Arthur; Ravenel Jr. (R)	Floyd Spence (R)	Butler Derrick (D)	Liz J. Patterson (D)	John Spratt (D)	Robin Tallon (D)
103rd (1993–1995)	Arthur; Ravenel Jr. (R)	Floyd Spence (R)	Butler Derrick (D)	Bob Inglis (R)	John Spratt (D)	Jim Clyburn (D)
104th (1995–1997)	Mark Sanford (R)	Floyd Spence (R)	Lindsey; Graham (R)	Bob Inglis (R)	John Spratt (D)	Jim Clyburn (D)
105th (1997–1999)	Mark Sanford (R)	Floyd Spence (R)	Lindsey; Graham (R)	Bob Inglis (R)	John Spratt (D)	Jim Clyburn (D)
106th (1999–2001)	Mark Sanford (R)	Floyd Spence (R)	Lindsey; Graham (R)	Jim DeMint (R)	John Spratt (D)	Jim Clyburn (D)
107th (2001–2003)	Henry Brown (R)	Floyd Spence (R)	Lindsey; Graham (R)	Jim DeMint (R)	John Spratt (D)	Jim Clyburn (D)
107th (2001–2003)	Henry Brown (R)	Joe Wilson (R)	Lindsey; Graham (R)	Jim DeMint (R)	John Spratt (D)	Jim Clyburn (D)
108th (2003–2005)	Henry Brown (R)	Joe Wilson (R)	Gresham; Barrett (R)	Jim DeMint (R)	John Spratt (D)	Jim Clyburn (D)
109th (2005–2007)	Henry Brown (R)	Joe Wilson (R)	Gresham; Barrett (R)	Bob Inglis (R)	John Spratt (D)	Jim Clyburn (D)
110th (2007–2009)	Henry Brown (R)	Joe Wilson (R)	Gresham; Barrett (R)	Bob Inglis (R)	John Spratt (D)	Jim Clyburn (D)
111th (2009–2011)	Henry Brown (R)	Joe Wilson (R)	Gresham; Barrett (R)	Bob Inglis (R)	John Spratt (D)	Jim Clyburn (D)
112th (2011–2013)	Tim Scott (R)	Joe Wilson (R)	Jeff Duncan (R)	Trey Gowdy (R)	Mick Mulvaney (R)	Jim Clyburn (D)

==== 2013–present ====
Congress	District						
Congress	1st	2nd	3rd	4th	5th	6th	7th
113th (2013–2015)	Mark Sanford (R)	Joe Wilson (R)	Jeff Duncan (R)	Trey Gowdy (R)	Mick Mulvaney (R)	Jim Clyburn (D)	Tom Rice (R)
114th (2015–2017)	Mark Sanford (R)	Joe Wilson (R)	Jeff Duncan (R)	Trey Gowdy (R)	Mick Mulvaney (R)	Jim Clyburn (D)	Tom Rice (R)
115th (2017–2019)	Mark Sanford (R)	Joe Wilson (R)	Jeff Duncan (R)	Trey Gowdy (R)	Mick Mulvaney (R)	Jim Clyburn (D)	Tom Rice (R)
115th (2017–2019)	Mark Sanford (R)	Joe Wilson (R)	Jeff Duncan (R)	Trey Gowdy (R)	Ralph Norman (R)	Jim Clyburn (D)	Tom Rice (R)
116th (2019–2021)	Joe Cunningham (D)	Joe Wilson (R)	Jeff Duncan (R)	William; Timmons (R)	Ralph Norman (R)	Jim Clyburn (D)	Tom Rice (R)
117th (2021-2023)	Nancy Mace (R)	Joe Wilson (R)	Jeff Duncan (R)	William; Timmons (R)	Ralph Norman (R)	Jim Clyburn (D)	Tom Rice (R)
118th (2023-2025)	Nancy Mace (R)	Joe Wilson (R)	Jeff Duncan (R)	William; Timmons (R)	Ralph Norman (R)	Jim Clyburn (D)	Russell Fry (R)
119th (2025-2027)	Nancy Mace (R)	Joe Wilson (R)	Sheri Biggs (R)	William; Timmons (R)	Ralph Norman (R)	Jim Clyburn (D)	Russell Fry (R)
120th (2027-2029)	Nancy Lacore (D)	Joe Wilson (R)	Sheri Biggs (R)	William; Timmons (R)	Wes Climer (R)	Jim Clyburn (D)	Russell Fry (R)

== United States Senate ==
Current U.S. senators from South Carolina
South Carolina CPVI (2025): R+8	Class II senator	Class III senator
South Carolina CPVI (2025): R+8	Darline Graham (Junior senator) (Lexington)	Tim Scott (Senior senator) (Hanahan)
Party	Republican	Republican
Incumbent since	July 13, 2026	January 2, 2013

Class II senator	Congress	Class III senator
Pierce Butler (PA)	1st (1789–1791)	Ralph Izard (PA)
Pierce Butler (AA)	2nd (1791–1793)	Ralph Izard (PA)
Pierce Butler (AA)	3rd (1793–1795)	Ralph Izard (PA)
Pierce Butler (DR)	4th (1795–1797)	Jacob Read (F)
John Hunter (DR)	4th (1795–1797)	Jacob Read (F)
John Hunter (DR)	5th (1797–1799)	Jacob Read (F)
Charles Pinckney (DR)	5th (1797–1799)	Jacob Read (F)
Charles Pinckney (DR)	6th (1799–1801)	Jacob Read (F)
Charles Pinckney (DR)	7th (1801–1803)	John E. Colhoun (DR)
Thomas Sumter (DR)	7th (1801–1803)	Pierce Butler (DR)
Thomas Sumter (DR)	8th (1803–1805)	Pierce Butler (DR)
Thomas Sumter (DR)	8th (1803–1805)	John Gaillard (DR)
Thomas Sumter (DR)	9th (1805–1807)	John Gaillard (DR)
Thomas Sumter (DR)	10th (1807–1809)	John Gaillard (DR)
Thomas Sumter (DR)	11th (1809–1811)	John Gaillard (DR)
John Taylor (DR)	11th (1809–1811)	John Gaillard (DR)
John Taylor (DR)	12th (1811–1813)	John Gaillard (DR)
John Taylor (DR)	13th (1813–1815)	John Gaillard (DR)
John Taylor (DR)	14th (1815–1817)	John Gaillard (DR)
William Smith (DR)	14th (1815–1817)	John Gaillard (DR)
William Smith (DR)	15th (1817–1819)	John Gaillard (DR)
William Smith (DR)	16th (1819–1821)	John Gaillard (DR)
William Smith (DR)	17th (1821–1823)	John Gaillard (DR)
Robert Y. Hayne (DR)	18th (1823–1825)	John Gaillard (DR)
Robert Y. Hayne (J)	19th (1825–1827)	John Gaillard (J)
Robert Y. Hayne (J)	19th (1825–1827)	William Harper (J)
Robert Y. Hayne (J)	19th (1825–1827)	William Smith (J)
Robert Y. Hayne (J)	20th (1827–1829)	William Smith (J)
Robert Y. Hayne (J)	21st (1829–1831)	William Smith (J)
Robert Y. Hayne (N)	22nd (1831–1833)	Stephen Decatur Miller (N)
John C. Calhoun (N)	22nd (1831–1833)	Stephen Decatur Miller (N)
John C. Calhoun (N)	23rd (1833–1835)	William C. Preston (N)
John C. Calhoun (N)	24th (1835–1837)	William C. Preston (N)
John C. Calhoun (D)	25th (1837–1839)	William C. Preston (W)
John C. Calhoun (D)	26th (1839–1841)	William C. Preston (W)
John C. Calhoun (D)	27th (1841–1843)	William C. Preston (W)
John C. Calhoun (D)	27th (1841–1843)	George McDuffie (D)
Daniel Elliott Huger (D)	28th (1843–1845)	George McDuffie (D)
John C. Calhoun (D)	29th (1845–1847)	George McDuffie (D)
John C. Calhoun (D)	29th (1845–1847)	Andrew Butler (D)
John C. Calhoun (D)	30th (1847–1849)	Andrew Butler (D)
John C. Calhoun (D)	31st (1849–1851)	Andrew Butler (D)
Franklin H. Elmore (D)	31st (1849–1851)	Andrew Butler (D)
Robert Woodward Barnwell (D)	31st (1849–1851)	Andrew Butler (D)
Robert Barnwell Rhett (D)	31st (1849–1851)	Andrew Butler (D)
Robert Barnwell Rhett (D)	32nd (1851–1853)	Andrew Butler (D)
William F. De Saussure (D)	32nd (1851–1853)	Andrew Butler (D)
Josiah J. Evans (D)	33rd (1853–1855)	Andrew Butler (D)
Josiah J. Evans (D)	34th (1855–1857)	Andrew Butler (D)
Josiah J. Evans (D)	35th (1857–1859)	Andrew Butler (D)
Arthur P. Hayne (D)	35th (1857–1859)	Andrew Butler (D)
James Chesnut Jr. (D)	35th (1857–1859)	James H. Hammond (D)
James Chesnut Jr. (D)	36th (1859–1861)	James H. Hammond (D)
vacant	36th (1859–1861)	vacant
vacant	37th (1861–1863)	vacant
vacant	38th (1863–1865)	vacant
vacant	39th (1865–1867)	vacant
vacant	40th (1867–1869)	vacant
Thomas J. Robertson (R)	40th (1867–1869)	Frederick A. Sawyer (R)
Thomas J. Robertson (R)	41st (1869–1871)	Frederick A. Sawyer (R)
Thomas J. Robertson (R)	42nd (1871–1873)	Frederick A. Sawyer (R)
Thomas J. Robertson (R)	43rd (1873–1875)	John J. Patterson (R)
Thomas J. Robertson (R)	44th (1875–1877)	John J. Patterson (R)
Matthew Butler (D)	45th (1877–1879)	John J. Patterson (R)
Matthew Butler (D)	46th (1879–1881)	Wade Hampton III (D)
Matthew Butler (D)	47th (1881–1883)	Wade Hampton III (D)
Matthew Butler (D)	48th (1883–1885)	Wade Hampton III (D)
Matthew Butler (D)	49th (1885–1887)	Wade Hampton III (D)
Matthew Butler (D)	50th (1887–1889)	Wade Hampton III (D)
Matthew Butler (D)	51st (1889–1891)	Wade Hampton III (D)
Matthew Butler (D)	52nd (1891–1893)	John L. M. Irby (D)
Matthew Butler (D)	53rd (1893–1895)	John L. M. Irby (D)
Benjamin Tillman (D)	54th (1895–1897)	John L. M. Irby (D)
Benjamin Tillman (D)	55th (1897–1899)	Joseph H. Earle (D)
Benjamin Tillman (D)	55th (1897–1899)	John L. McLaurin (D)
Benjamin Tillman (D)	56th (1899–1901)	John L. McLaurin (D)
Benjamin Tillman (D)	57th (1901–1903)	John L. McLaurin (D)
Benjamin Tillman (D)	58th (1903–1905)	Asbury Latimer (D)
Benjamin Tillman (D)	59th (1905–1907)	Asbury Latimer (D)
Benjamin Tillman (D)	60th (1907–1909)	Asbury Latimer (D)
Benjamin Tillman (D)	60th (1907–1909)	Frank B. Gary (D)
Benjamin Tillman (D)	61st (1909–1911)	Ellison D. Smith (D)
Benjamin Tillman (D)	62nd (1911–1913)	Ellison D. Smith (D)
Benjamin Tillman (D)	63rd (1913–1915)	Ellison D. Smith (D)
Benjamin Tillman (D)	64th (1915–1917)	Ellison D. Smith (D)
Benjamin Tillman (D)	65th (1917–1919)	Ellison D. Smith (D)
Christie Benet (D)	65th (1917–1919)	Ellison D. Smith (D)
William P. Pollock (D)	65th (1917–1919)	Ellison D. Smith (D)
Nathaniel B. Dial (D)	66th (1919–1921)	Ellison D. Smith (D)
Nathaniel B. Dial (D)	67th (1921–1923)	Ellison D. Smith (D)
Nathaniel B. Dial (D)	68th (1923–1925)	Ellison D. Smith (D)
Cole L. Blease (D)	69th (1925–1927)	Ellison D. Smith (D)
Cole L. Blease (D)	70th (1927–1929)	Ellison D. Smith (D)
Cole L. Blease (D)	71st (1929–1931)	Ellison D. Smith (D)
James F. Byrnes (D)	72nd (1931–1933)	Ellison D. Smith (D)
James F. Byrnes (D)	73rd (1933–1935)	Ellison D. Smith (D)
James F. Byrnes (D)	74th (1935–1937)	Ellison D. Smith (D)
James F. Byrnes (D)	75th (1937–1939)	Ellison D. Smith (D)
James F. Byrnes (D)	76th (1939–1941)	Ellison D. Smith (D)
James F. Byrnes (D)	77th (1941–1943)	Ellison D. Smith (D)
Alva M. Lumpkin (D)	77th (1941–1943)	Ellison D. Smith (D)
Roger C. Peace (D)	77th (1941–1943)	Ellison D. Smith (D)
Burnet R. Maybank (D)	77th (1941–1943)	Ellison D. Smith (D)
Burnet R. Maybank (D)	78th (1943–1945)	Ellison D. Smith (D)
Burnet R. Maybank (D)	78th (1943–1945)	Wilton E. Hall (D)
Burnet R. Maybank (D)	79th (1945–1947)	Olin D. Johnston (D)
Burnet R. Maybank (D)	80th (1947–1949)	Olin D. Johnston (D)
Burnet R. Maybank (D)	81st (1949–1951)	Olin D. Johnston (D)
Burnet R. Maybank (D)	82nd (1951–1953)	Olin D. Johnston (D)
Burnet R. Maybank (D)	83rd (1953–1955)	Olin D. Johnston (D)
Charles E. Daniel (D)	83rd (1953–1955)	Olin D. Johnston (D)
Strom Thurmond (D)	83rd (1953–1955)	Olin D. Johnston (D)
Strom Thurmond (D)	84th (1955–1957)	Olin D. Johnston (D)
Thomas A. Wofford (D)	84th (1955–1957)	Olin D. Johnston (D)
Strom Thurmond (D)	84th (1955–1957)	Olin D. Johnston (D)
Strom Thurmond (D)	85th (1957–1959)	Olin D. Johnston (D)
Strom Thurmond (D)	86th (1959–1961)	Olin D. Johnston (D)
Strom Thurmond (D)	87th (1961–1963)	Olin D. Johnston (D)
Strom Thurmond (D)	88th (1963–1965)	Olin D. Johnston (D)
Strom Thurmond (R)	88th (1963–1965)	Olin D. Johnston (D)
Strom Thurmond (R)	89th (1965–1967)	Olin D. Johnston (D)
Strom Thurmond (R)	89th (1965–1967)	Donald S. Russell (D)
Strom Thurmond (R)	89th (1965–1967)	Fritz Hollings (D)
Strom Thurmond (R)	90th (1967–1969)	Fritz Hollings (D)
Strom Thurmond (R)	91st (1969–1971)	Fritz Hollings (D)
Strom Thurmond (R)	92nd (1971–1973)	Fritz Hollings (D)
Strom Thurmond (R)	93rd (1973–1975)	Fritz Hollings (D)
Strom Thurmond (R)	94th (1975–1977)	Fritz Hollings (D)
Strom Thurmond (R)	95th (1977–1979)	Fritz Hollings (D)
Strom Thurmond (R)	96th (1979–1981)	Fritz Hollings (D)
Strom Thurmond (R)	97th (1981–1983)	Fritz Hollings (D)
Strom Thurmond (R)	98th (1983–1985)	Fritz Hollings (D)
Strom Thurmond (R)	99th (1985–1987)	Fritz Hollings (D)
Strom Thurmond (R)	100th (1987–1989)	Fritz Hollings (D)
Strom Thurmond (R)	101st (1989–1991)	Fritz Hollings (D)
Strom Thurmond (R)	102nd (1991–1993)	Fritz Hollings (D)
Strom Thurmond (R)	103rd (1993–1995)	Fritz Hollings (D)
Strom Thurmond (R)	104th (1995–1997)	Fritz Hollings (D)
Strom Thurmond (R)	105th (1997–1999)	Fritz Hollings (D)
Strom Thurmond (R)	106th (1999–2001)	Fritz Hollings (D)
Strom Thurmond (R)	107th (2001–2003)	Fritz Hollings (D)
Lindsey Graham (R)	108th (2003–2005)	Fritz Hollings (D)
Lindsey Graham (R)	109th (2005–2007)	Jim DeMint (R)
Lindsey Graham (R)	110th (2007–2009)	Jim DeMint (R)
Lindsey Graham (R)	111th (2009–2011)	Jim DeMint (R)
Lindsey Graham (R)	112th (2011–2013)	Jim DeMint (R)
Lindsey Graham (R)	112th (2011–2013)	Tim Scott (R)
Lindsey Graham (R)	113th (2013–2015)	Tim Scott (R)
Lindsey Graham (R)	114th (2015–2017)	Tim Scott (R)
Lindsey Graham (R)	115th (2017–2019)	Tim Scott (R)
Lindsey Graham (R)	116th (2019–2021)	Tim Scott (R)
Lindsey Graham (R)	117th (2021–2023)	Tim Scott (R)
Lindsey Graham (R)	118th (2023–2025)	Tim Scott (R)
Lindsey Graham (R)	119th (2025–2027)	Tim Scott (R)
Darline Graham (R)	119th (2025–2027)	Tim Scott (R)
Annie Andrews (D)	120th (2027–2029)	Tim Scott (R)

== Key ==
Anti-Administration (AA)
Democratic (D)
Democratic-Republican (DR)
Dixiecrat (Dix),
States' Rights (SR)
Federalist (F)
Pro-Administration (PA)
Independent Republican (IR)
Jacksonian (J)
National Republican (NR)
Nullifier (N)
Republican (R)
Whig (W)

== See also ==
- South Carolina's congressional districts
- List of United States congressional districts
- Political party strength in South Carolina
