= 1800 United States House of Representatives elections in South Carolina =

Of the 6 South Carolina incumbents, only 3 were re-elected.

South Carolina switched to a general ticket for its two seats, instead of electing each one separately. Only one candidate received a majority in the 1800 election, requiring an 1801 run-off election to choose a Representative for the second seat.

| District | Incumbent | Party | First elected | Result | Candidates |
|---|---|---|---|---|---|
| South Carolina 1 "Charleston District" | Thomas Pinckney | Federalist | 1797 (special) | Incumbent retired. Federalist hold. | √ Thomas Lowndes (Federalist) 94.8% (Note: Percent based on incomplete records); Robert Simons (Democratic-Republican) 5.2% |
| South Carolina 2 "Beaufort District" | John Rutledge, Jr. | Federalist | 1796 | Incumbent re-elected. | √ John Rutledge, Jr. (Federalist) 60.3% Charles J. Colcock (Democratic-Republican) 39.7% |
| South Carolina 3 "Georgetown District" | Benjamin Huger | Federalist | 1798 | Incumbent re-elected. | √ Benjamin Huger (Federalist) 54.5% Lemuel Benton (Democratic-Republican) 45.1% Tristam Thomas 0.4% |
| South Carolina 4 "Camden District" | Thomas Sumter | Democratic-Republican | 1796 | Incumbent re-elected. | √ Thomas Sumter (Democratic-Republican) 63.3% Richard Winn (Federalist) 32.6% William Bracey (Federalist) 4.1% |
| South Carolina 5 "Ninety-Six District" | Robert Goodloe Harper | Federalist | 1794 | Incumbent retired. Democratic-Republican gain. | √ William Butler Sr. (Democratic-Republican) 63.9% John Nicholls (Federalist) 31.0% Charles Goodwyn (Federalist) 5.1% |
| South Carolina 6 "Washington District" | Abraham Nott | Federalist | 1798 | Incumbent retired. Democratic-Republican gain. | √ Thomas Moore (Democratic-Republican) 50.7% William Smith (Democratic-Republican) 49.3% |

== See also ==
- List of United States representatives from South Carolina
- United States House of Representatives elections, 1800 and 1801
