= John Campbell (South Carolina politician) =

American politician

Member of the U.S. House of Representatives from South Carolina
- In office March 4, 1829 – March 3, 1831
- Preceded by: Robert B. Campbell
- Succeeded by: Joseph A. Woodward
- Constituency: 3rd district
- In office March 4, 1837 – March 3, 1845
- Preceded by: Thomas R. Mitchell (3rd); Samuel W. Trotti (4th)
- Succeeded by: Theodore Gourdin (3rd); Alexander D. Sims (4th)
- Constituency: 3rd district (1837-43); 4th district (1843-45)

Personal details
- Born: unknown Marlboro County, South Carolina
- Died: May 19, 1845 Parnassus, South Carolina
- Resting place: Blenheim, South Carolina
- Party: Jacksonian
- Other political affiliations: Nullifier, Democratic
- Education: South Carolina College
- Profession: lawyer, politician

John Campbell (unknown – died May 19, 1845) was a U.S. representative from South Carolina, brother of Robert Blair Campbell.

Born near Brownsville, Marlboro County, South Carolina, Campbell had graduated from South Carolina College (now the University of South Carolina) in Columbia in 1819. He studied law. He was admitted to the bar and commenced practice in Brownsville, South Carolina. He moved to Parnassus, Marlboro District, and continued the practice of law.

Campbell was elected as a Jacksonian to the Twenty-first Congress (March 4, 1829 – March 3, 1831). Campbell was elected as a Nullifies to the Twenty-fifth Congress and as a Democrat to the three succeeding Congresses (March 4, 1837 – March 3, 1843). He served as Chairman of the Committee on Elections (Twenty-sixth Congress), Committee on District of Columbia (Twenty-eighth Congress).

He died in Parnassus (now Blenheim), Marlboro County, South Carolina, on May 19, 1845. He was interred in a private cemetery near Blenheim, South Carolina.

== Sources ==
- United States Congress. "John Campbell (id: C000090)". Biographical Directory of the United States Congress.

U.S. House of Representatives
| Preceded by Thomas R. Mitchell | Member of the U.S. House of Representatives from South Carolina's 3rd congressional district 1829–1831 | Succeeded by Thomas R. Mitchell |
| Preceded by Robert B. Campbell | Member of the U.S. House of Representatives from South Carolina's 3rd congressional district 1837–1843 | Succeeded by Joseph A. Woodward |
| Preceded by Samuel W. Trotti | Member of the U.S. House of Representatives from South Carolina's 4th congressional district 1843–1845 | Succeeded by Alexander D. Sims |
