= South Carolina's 3rd congressional district =

U.S. House district for South Carolina

Coordinates: 34.36°N 82.29°W

- Interactive map of district boundaries since January 3, 2023
- Representative: Sheri Biggs; R–Salem
- Population (2025): 789,497
- Median household income: $68,831
- Ethnicity: 71.7% White; 17.0% Black; 5.8% Hispanic; 3.8% Two or more races; 1.1% Asian; 0.6% other
- Cook PVI: R+21

South Carolina's 3rd congressional district is a congressional district in western South Carolina bordering both Georgia and North Carolina. It includes all of Abbeville, Anderson, Edgefield, Greenwood, Laurens, McCormick, Oconee, Pickens, and Saluda counties and portions of Greenville and Newberry counties. The district is mostly rural, but much of the economy revolves around the manufacturing centers of Anderson and Greenwood. Clemson University, the state's second largest by enrollment, is also in the district.

With a Cook Partisan Voting Index rating of R+21, it is the most Republican district in South Carolina.

== History ==
Historically, the district was a Democratic stronghold, and Democrats continued to hold most local offices well into the 1990s. However, most residents share the socially conservative views of their counterparts in the 4th district and the district has elected Republicans since 1994. Republicans now dominate the district's politics at all levels, usually scoring margins rivaling those in the 4th. Indeed, no Democrat has cleared the 40 percent mark in the district in almost a quarter-century.

A former South Carolina senior Senator, Lindsey Graham, held this seat from 1995 to 2003. He was succeeded by J. Gresham Barrett, who gave up the seat in order to run for governor. State Rep. Jeff Duncan won the seat in 2010.

From 2003 to 2013, the district included all of Abbeville, Anderson, Edgefield, Greenwood, McCormick, Oconee, Pickens and Saluda counties and most of Aiken and Laurens counties.

== Composition ==
For the 118th and successive Congresses (based on redistricting following the 2020 census), the district contains all or portions of the following counties and communities:

Abbeville County (9)
All 9 communities
Anderson County (19)
All 19 communities
Edgefield County (5)
All 5 communities
Greenville County (4)
Fountain Inn (shared with Laurens County), Golden Grove (part; also 4th), Piedmont (shared with Anderson County), Ware Place
Greenwood County (9)
All 9 communities
Laurens County (11)
All 11 communities
McCormick County (7)
All 7 communities
Newberry County (8)
All 8 communities
Oconee County (13)
All 13 communities
Pickens County (11)
All 11 communities
Saluda County (5)
All 5 communities

== Recent election results from statewide races ==
Year	Office	Results
2008	President	McCain 63% - 35%
2012	President	Romney 66% - 34%
2016	President	Trump 67% - 29%
2016	Senate	Scott 71% - 27%
2018	Governor	McMaster 66% - 33%
2018	Secretary of State	Hammond 69% - 30%
2018	Treasurer	Loftis 68% - 29%
2018	Attorney General	Wilson 68% - 30%
2020	President	Trump 68% - 31%
2020	Senate	Graham 67% - 31%
2022	Senate	Scott 75% - 25%
2022	Governor	McMaster 71% - 28%
2022	Secretary of State	Hammond 75% - 25%
2024	President	Trump 71% - 28%
2026	Senate	Graham 58% - 38%
2026	Governor	Wilson 64% - 34%

== List of members representing the district ==
Member (Residence)	Party	Years	Cong ress	Electoral history	District location
District established March 4, 1789
Daniel Huger (Charleston)	Pro-Administration	March 4, 1789 – March 3, 1793	1st 2nd	Elected in 1788. Re-elected in 1790. Retired.	1789–1793 "Georgetown-Cheraw district" 1st district: Charleston 2nd district: Beaufort-Orangeburg 3rd district: Georgetown-Cheraw 4th district: Camden 5th district: Ninety-Six
Lemuel Benton (Stoney Hill Farm)	Anti-Administration	March 4, 1793 – March 3, 1795	3rd 4th 5th	Elected in 1793. Re-elected in 1794. Re-elected in 1796. Lost re-election.	1793–1795 "Georgetown-Cheraw district"
Lemuel Benton (Stoney Hill Farm)	Democratic-Republican	March 4, 1795 – March 3, 1799	3rd 4th 5th	Elected in 1793. Re-elected in 1794. Re-elected in 1796. Lost re-election.	1793–1795 "Georgetown-Cheraw district"
Lemuel Benton (Stoney Hill Farm)	Democratic-Republican	March 4, 1795 – March 3, 1799	3rd 4th 5th	Elected in 1793. Re-elected in 1794. Re-elected in 1796. Lost re-election.	1795–1799 "Georgetown district" 1796 election results by district
Benjamin Huger (Georgetown)	Federalist	March 4, 1799 – March 3, 1805	6th 7th 8th	Elected in 1798. Re-elected in 1800. Re-elected in 1803. Retired.	1799–1833 "Georgetown district"
David R. Williams (Society Hill)	Democratic-Republican	March 4, 1805 – March 3, 1809	9th 10th	Elected in 1804. Re-elected in 1806. Retired.	1799–1833 "Georgetown district"
Robert Witherspoon (Mayesville)	Democratic-Republican	March 4, 1809 – March 3, 1811	11th	Elected in 1808. Retired.	1799–1833 "Georgetown district"
David R. Williams (Society Hill)	Democratic-Republican	March 4, 1811 – March 3, 1813	12th	Elected in 1810. Retired.	1799–1833 "Georgetown district"
Theodore Gourdin (Pineville)	Democratic-Republican	March 4, 1813 – March 3, 1815	13th	Elected in 1812. Lost re-election.	1799–1833 "Georgetown district"
Benjamin Huger (Georgetown)	Federalist	March 4, 1815 – March 3, 1817	14th	Elected in 1814. Lost re-election.	1799–1833 "Georgetown district"
James Ervin (Darlington)	Democratic-Republican	March 4, 1817 – March 3, 1821	15th 16th	Elected in 1816. Re-elected in 1818. Retired.	1799–1833 "Georgetown district"
Thomas R. Mitchell (Georgetown)	Democratic-Republican	March 4, 1821 – March 3, 1823	17th	Elected in 1820. Lost re-election.	1799–1833 "Georgetown district"
Robert B. Campbell (Brownsville)	Democratic-Republican	March 4, 1823 – March 3, 1825	18th	Elected in 1823. Retired.	1799–1833 "Georgetown district"
Thomas R. Mitchell (Georgetown)	Jacksonian	March 4, 1825 – March 3, 1829	19th 20th	Elected in 1824. Re-elected in 1826. Lost re-election.	1799–1833 "Georgetown district"
John Campbell (Brownsville)	Jacksonian	March 4, 1829 – March 3, 1831	21st	Elected in 1828. Lost re-election.	1799–1833 "Georgetown district"
Thomas R. Mitchell (Georgetown)	Jacksonian	March 4, 1831 – March 3, 1833	22nd	Elected in 1830. Lost re-election.	1799–1833 "Georgetown district"
Thomas Singleton (Kingstree)	Nullifier	March 4, 1833 – November 25, 1833	23rd	Elected in 1833. Died.	1833–1843 [data missing]
Vacant		November 25, 1833 – February 27, 1834	23rd		1833–1843 [data missing]
Robert B. Campbell (Brownsville)	Nullifier	February 27, 1834 – March 3, 1837	23rd 24th	Elected to finish Singleton's term. Re-elected in 1834. Retired.	1833–1843 [data missing]
John Campbell (Parnassus)	Nullifier	March 4, 1837 – March 3, 1839	25th 26th 27th	Elected in 1836. Re-elected in 1838. Re-elected in 1840. Redistricted to the 4th district.	1833–1843 [data missing]
John Campbell (Parnassus)	Democratic	March 4, 1839 – March 3, 1843	25th 26th 27th	Elected in 1836. Re-elected in 1838. Re-elected in 1840. Redistricted to the 4th district.	1833–1843 [data missing]
Joseph A. Woodward (Winnsboro)	Democratic	March 4, 1843 – March 3, 1853	28th 29th 30th 31st 32nd	Elected in 1843. Re-elected in 1844. Re-elected in 1846. Re-elected in 1848. Re-elected in 1850. Retired.	1843–1853 [data missing]
Laurence M. Keitt (Orangeburg)	Democratic	March 4, 1853 – July 15, 1856	33rd 34th	Elected in 1853. Re-elected in 1854. Resigned to gain constituents' support following the caning of Charles Sumner.	1853–1860 [data missing]
Vacant		July 15, 1856 – August 6, 1856	34th		1853–1860 [data missing]
Laurence M. Keitt (Orangeburg)	Democratic	August 6, 1856 – December 1860	34th 35th 36th	Re-elected to finish his own term. Re-elected in 1856. Re-elected in 1858. Retired early due to Civil War.	1853–1860 [data missing]
District inactive		December 1860 – July 25, 1868	36th 37th 38th 39th 40th	Civil War and Reconstruction	
Manuel S. Corley (Lexington)	Republican	July 25, 1868 – March 3, 1869	40th	Elected to finish the short term. Retired.	1868–1873 [data missing]
Solomon L. Hoge (Columbia)	Republican	April 8, 1869 – March 3, 1871	41st	Elected in 1868 (Successfully contested election of J.P. Reed). Retired.	1868–1873 [data missing]
Robert B. Elliott (Columbia)	Republican	March 4, 1871 – November 1, 1874	42nd 43rd	Elected in 1870. Re-elected in 1872. Resigned to become sheriff.	1868–1873 [data missing]
Robert B. Elliott (Columbia)	Republican	March 4, 1871 – November 1, 1874	42nd 43rd	Elected in 1870. Re-elected in 1872. Resigned to become sheriff.	1873–1883 [data missing]
Vacant		November 1, 1874 – November 3, 1874	43rd		1873–1883 [data missing]
Lewis C. Carpenter (Columbia)	Republican	November 3, 1874 – March 3, 1875	43rd	Elected to finish Elliott's term. Retired.	1873–1883 [data missing]
Solomon L. Hoge (Columbia)	Republican	March 4, 1875 – March 3, 1877	44th	Elected in 1874. Retired.	1873–1883 [data missing]
D. Wyatt Aiken (Cokesbury)	Democratic	March 4, 1877 – March 3, 1887	45th 46th 47th 48th 49th	Elected in 1876. Re-elected in 1878. Re-elected in 1880. Re-elected in 1882. Re-elected in 1884. Retired.	1873–1883 [data missing]
D. Wyatt Aiken (Cokesbury)	Democratic	March 4, 1877 – March 3, 1887	45th 46th 47th 48th 49th	Elected in 1876. Re-elected in 1878. Re-elected in 1880. Re-elected in 1882. Re-elected in 1884. Retired.	1883–1893 [data missing]
James S. Cothran (Abbeville)	Democratic	March 4, 1887 – March 3, 1891	50th 51st	Elected in 1886. Re-elected in 1888. Retired.	1883–1893 [data missing]
George Johnstone (Newberry)	Democratic	March 4, 1891 – March 3, 1893	52nd	Elected in 1890. Lost renomination.	1883–1893 [data missing]
Asbury C. Latimer (Belton)	Democratic	March 4, 1893 – March 3, 1903	53rd 54th 55th 56th 57th	Elected in 1892. Re-elected in 1894. Re-elected in 1896. Re-elected in 1898. Re-elected in 1900. Retired.	1893–1903 [data missing]
Wyatt Aiken (Abbeville)	Democratic	March 4, 1903 – March 3, 1917	58th 59th 60th 61st 62nd 63rd 64th	Elected in 1902. Re-elected in 1904. Re-elected in 1906. Re-elected in 1908. Re-elected in 1910. Re-elected in 1912. Re-elected in 1914. Lost renomination.	1903–1913 [data missing]
Wyatt Aiken (Abbeville)	Democratic	March 4, 1903 – March 3, 1917	58th 59th 60th 61st 62nd 63rd 64th	Elected in 1902. Re-elected in 1904. Re-elected in 1906. Re-elected in 1908. Re-elected in 1910. Re-elected in 1912. Re-elected in 1914. Lost renomination.	1913–1933; Abbeville, Anderson, Greenwood, Newberry, Oconee, and Pickens counties.
Frederick H. Dominick (Newberry)	Democratic	March 4, 1917 – March 3, 1933	65th 66th 67th 68th 69th 70th 71st 72nd	Elected in 1916. Re-elected in 1918. Re-elected in 1920. Re-elected in 1922. Re-elected in 1924. Re-elected in 1926. Re-elected in 1928. Re-elected in 1930. Lost renomination.	1913–1933; Abbeville, Anderson, Greenwood, Newberry, Oconee, and Pickens counties.
John C. Taylor (Anderson)	Democratic	March 4, 1933 – January 3, 1939	73rd 74th 75th	Elected in 1932. Re-elected in 1934. Re-elected in 1936. Lost renomination.	1933–1943 [data missing]
Butler B. Hare (Saluda)	Democratic	January 3, 1939 – January 3, 1947	76th 77th 78th 79th	Elected in 1938. Re-elected in 1940. Re-elected in 1942. Re-elected in 1944. Retired.	1933–1943 [data missing]
Butler B. Hare (Saluda)	Democratic	January 3, 1939 – January 3, 1947	76th 77th 78th 79th	Elected in 1938. Re-elected in 1940. Re-elected in 1942. Re-elected in 1944. Retired.	1943–1953 [data missing]
W.J. Bryan Dorn (Greenwood)	Democratic	January 3, 1947 – January 3, 1949	80th	Elected in 1946. Retired to run for U.S. senator.	1943–1953 [data missing]
James Butler Hare (Saluda)	Democratic	January 3, 1949 – January 3, 1951	81st	Elected in 1948. Lost renomination.	1943–1953 [data missing]
W.J. Bryan Dorn (Greenwood)	Democratic	January 3, 1951 – December 31, 1974	82nd 83rd 84th 85th 86th 87th 88th 89th 90th 91st 92nd 93rd	Elected in 1950. Re-elected in 1952. Re-elected in 1954. Re-elected in 1956. Re-elected in 1958. Re-elected in 1960. Re-elected in 1962. Re-elected in 1964. Re-elected in 1966. Re-elected in 1968. Re-elected in 1970. Re-elected in 1972. Retired to run for governor and resigned following defeat.	1943–1953 [data missing]
W.J. Bryan Dorn (Greenwood)	Democratic	January 3, 1951 – December 31, 1974	82nd 83rd 84th 85th 86th 87th 88th 89th 90th 91st 92nd 93rd	Elected in 1950. Re-elected in 1952. Re-elected in 1954. Re-elected in 1956. Re-elected in 1958. Re-elected in 1960. Re-elected in 1962. Re-elected in 1964. Re-elected in 1966. Re-elected in 1968. Re-elected in 1970. Re-elected in 1972. Retired to run for governor and resigned following defeat.	1953–1963 [data missing]
W.J. Bryan Dorn (Greenwood)	Democratic	January 3, 1951 – December 31, 1974	82nd 83rd 84th 85th 86th 87th 88th 89th 90th 91st 92nd 93rd	Elected in 1950. Re-elected in 1952. Re-elected in 1954. Re-elected in 1956. Re-elected in 1958. Re-elected in 1960. Re-elected in 1962. Re-elected in 1964. Re-elected in 1966. Re-elected in 1968. Re-elected in 1970. Re-elected in 1972. Retired to run for governor and resigned following defeat.	1963–1973 [data missing]
W.J. Bryan Dorn (Greenwood)	Democratic	January 3, 1951 – December 31, 1974	82nd 83rd 84th 85th 86th 87th 88th 89th 90th 91st 92nd 93rd	Elected in 1950. Re-elected in 1952. Re-elected in 1954. Re-elected in 1956. Re-elected in 1958. Re-elected in 1960. Re-elected in 1962. Re-elected in 1964. Re-elected in 1966. Re-elected in 1968. Re-elected in 1970. Re-elected in 1972. Retired to run for governor and resigned following defeat.	1973–1983 [data missing]
Vacant		December 31, 1974 – January 3, 1975	93rd		1973–1983 [data missing]
Butler Derrick (Edgefield)	Democratic	January 3, 1975 – January 3, 1995	94th 95th 96th 97th 98th 99th 100th 101st 102nd 103rd	Elected in 1974. Re-elected in 1976. Re-elected in 1978. Re-elected in 1980. Re-elected in 1982. Re-elected in 1984. Re-elected in 1986. Re-elected in 1988. Re-elected in 1990. Re-elected in 1992. Retired.	1973–1983 [data missing]
Butler Derrick (Edgefield)	Democratic	January 3, 1975 – January 3, 1995	94th 95th 96th 97th 98th 99th 100th 101st 102nd 103rd	Elected in 1974. Re-elected in 1976. Re-elected in 1978. Re-elected in 1980. Re-elected in 1982. Re-elected in 1984. Re-elected in 1986. Re-elected in 1988. Re-elected in 1990. Re-elected in 1992. Retired.	1983–1993 [data missing]
Butler Derrick (Edgefield)	Democratic	January 3, 1975 – January 3, 1995	94th 95th 96th 97th 98th 99th 100th 101st 102nd 103rd	Elected in 1974. Re-elected in 1976. Re-elected in 1978. Re-elected in 1980. Re-elected in 1982. Re-elected in 1984. Re-elected in 1986. Re-elected in 1988. Re-elected in 1990. Re-elected in 1992. Retired.	1993–2003 [data missing]
Lindsey Graham (Seneca)	Republican	January 3, 1995 – January 3, 2003	104th 105th 106th 107th	Elected in 1994. Re-elected in 1996. Re-elected in 1998. Re-elected in 2000. Retired to run for U.S. senator.	1993–2003 [data missing]
Gresham Barrett (Westminster)	Republican	January 3, 2003 – January 3, 2011	108th 109th 110th 111th	Elected in 2002. Re-elected in 2004. Re-elected in 2006. Re-elected in 2008. Retired to run for governor.	2003–2013 All of Abbeville, Anderson, Edgefield, Greenwood, McCormick, Oconee, Pickens and Saluda counties and most of Aiken and Laurens counties.
Jeff Duncan (Laurens)	Republican	January 3, 2011 – January 3, 2025	112th 113th 114th 115th 116th 117th 118th	Elected in 2010. Re-elected in 2012. Re-elected in 2014. Re-elected in 2016. Re-elected in 2018. Re-elected in 2020. Re-elected in 2022. Retired.	2003–2013 All of Abbeville, Anderson, Edgefield, Greenwood, McCormick, Oconee, Pickens and Saluda counties and most of Aiken and Laurens counties.
Jeff Duncan (Laurens)	Republican	January 3, 2011 – January 3, 2025	112th 113th 114th 115th 116th 117th 118th	Elected in 2010. Re-elected in 2012. Re-elected in 2014. Re-elected in 2016. Re-elected in 2018. Re-elected in 2020. Re-elected in 2022. Retired.	2013–2023
Jeff Duncan (Laurens)	Republican	January 3, 2011 – January 3, 2025	112th 113th 114th 115th 116th 117th 118th	Elected in 2010. Re-elected in 2012. Re-elected in 2014. Re-elected in 2016. Re-elected in 2018. Re-elected in 2020. Re-elected in 2022. Retired.	2023–2033
Sheri Biggs (Salem)	Republican	January 3, 2025 – present	119th	Elected in 2024. Re-elected in 2026.	2023–2033

== Past election results ==
=== 2012 ===
2012 South Carolina's 3rd congressional district election
Party	Candidate	Votes	%
Republican	Jeff Duncan (incumbent)	169,512	66.5
Democratic	Bryan Ryan B. Doyle	84,735	33.3
Write-in		516	0.2
Total votes		254,763	100.0
Republican hold			

=== 2014 ===
2014 South Carolina's 3rd congressional district election
Party	Candidate	Votes	%
Republican	Jeff Duncan (incumbent)	116,741	71.2
Democratic	Barbara Jo Mullis	47,181	28.8
Write-in		87	0.0
Total votes		164,009	100.0
Republican hold			

=== 2016 ===
2016 South Carolina's 3rd congressional district election
Party	Candidate	Votes	%
Republican	Jeff Duncan (incumbent)	196,325	72.8
Democratic	Hosea Cleveland	72,933	27.1
Write-in		282	0.1
Total votes		269,540	100.0
Republican hold			

=== 2018 ===
2018 South Carolina's 3rd congressional district election
Party	Candidate	Votes	%
Republican	Jeff Duncan (incumbent)	153,338	67.8
Democratic	Mary Geren	70,046	31.0
American	Dave Moore	2,697	1.2
Write-in		123	0.0
Total votes		226,204	100.0
Republican hold			

=== 2020 ===
2020 South Carolina's 3rd congressional district election
Party	Candidate	Votes	%
Republican	Jeff Duncan (incumbent)	237,544	71.2
Democratic	Hosea Cleveland	95,712	28.7
Write-in		308	0.1
Total votes		333,564	100.0
Republican hold			

=== 2022 ===
2022 South Carolina's 3rd congressional district election
Party	Candidate	Votes	%
Republican	Jeff Duncan (incumbent)	189,971	97.64
Write-in		4,598	2.36
Total votes		194,569	100%
Republican hold			

=== 2024 ===
2024 South Carolina's 3rd congressional district election
Party	Candidate	Votes	%
Republican	Sheri Biggs	248,451	71.7
Democratic	Bryon Best	87,735	25.3
Alliance	Michael Bedenbaugh	9,918	2.9
Write-in		609	0.2
Total votes		346,713	100.0
Republican hold			

== See also ==
- List of United States congressional districts
- South Carolina's congressional districts
