= William Woodward (South Carolina politician) =

American politician

Member of the U.S. House of Representatives from South Carolina's 5th district
- In office March 4, 1815 – March 3, 1817
- Preceded by: David R. Evans
- Succeeded by: Starling Tucker

Member of the South Carolina House of Representatives from Chester District
- In office November 27, 1820 – (?)*

Member of the South Carolina House of Representatives from Fairfield District
- In office November 23, 1818 – November 27, 1820

Personal details
- Born: Unknown
- Died: Unknown
- Party: Democratic-Republican
- Woodward moved from South Carolina in 1823 and a special election was held to replace him; the exact date his replacement took the seat is not known, but it was no earlier than November 25, 1823.

William Woodward (October 7, 1762 – July 23, 1820) was an American politician who served as a U.S. representative from South Carolina.

Woodward served as member of the State house of representatives from 1818 to 1823. He was elected as a Democratic-Republican to the Fourteenth Congress (March 4, 1815 – March 3, 1817).

Woodward was a slave owner.

He was father of Joseph A. Woodward.

== Sources ==
- United States Congress. "William Woodward (id: W000733)". Biographical Directory of the United States Congress.

U.S. House of Representatives
Preceded by David R. Evans	Member of the U.S. House of Representatives from South Carolina's 5th congressional district 1815–1817	Succeeded by Starling Tucker
