= Robert Witherspoon =

American politician

Member of the South Carolina Senate from Claremont District
- In office November 27, 1821 – December 20, 1821
- Preceded by: Charles Miller
- Succeeded by: Stephen Decatur Miller

Member of the South Carolina House of Representatives from Williamsburg District
- In office November 24, 1806 – June 29, 1808
- In office November 22, 1802 – May 16, 1804
- In office November 26, 1792 – May 12, 1794

Member of the U.S. House of Representatives from South Carolina's 3rd district
- In office March 4, 1809 – March 3, 1811
- Preceded by: David R. Williams
- Succeeded by: David R. Williams

Treasurer of South Carolina
- In office 1800–1802
- Governor: John Drayton

Personal details
- Born: January 29, 1767 near Kingstree, Province of South Carolina, British America
- Died: October 11, 1837 (aged 70) near Mayesville, South Carolina, U.S.
- Party: Democratic-Republican
- Profession: planter, politician

Robert Witherspoon (January 29, 1767 – October 11, 1837) was an American politician who served as a U.S. representative from South Carolina.

Witherspoon was born near Kingstree in the Province of South Carolina as the son of a Scots-Irish father, Robert Witherspoon (1728–1778) who was born in County Down, Ireland and settled in the Province of South Carolina. His mother was Elizabeth Heathly Witherspoon (1740–1820), who was born in South Carolina. Robert Witherspoon attended local schools.

Witherspoon was elected State treasurer in 1800 and served one term. He was a member of the South Carolina House of Representatives from 1792 to 1794 from 1802 to 1804 and from 1806 to 1808.

Witherspoon was elected as a Democratic-Republican to the Eleventh Congress (March 4, 1809 – March 3, 1811). He declined to be a candidate for reelection. He had large slave planting interests in Sumter County, South Carolina. He opposed the nullification act in 1832.

He died near Mayesville, South Carolina, October 11, 1837. He was interred in the Salem Brick Church Cemetery.

He was great-great-grandfather of Robert Witherspoon Hemphill.

== Sources ==
- United States Congress. "Robert Witherspoon (id: W000661)". Biographical Directory of the United States Congress.

U.S. House of Representatives
Preceded by David R. Williams	Member of the U.S. House of Representatives from South Carolina's 3rd congressional district 1809–1811	Succeeded by David R. Williams
