= William J. Grayson =

American politician

William John Grayson
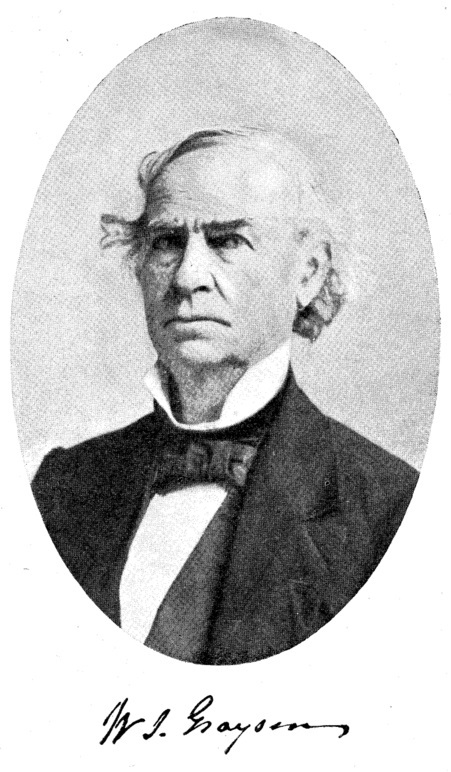

Member of the U.S. House of Representatives from South Carolina's 2nd district
- In office March 4, 1833 – March 3, 1837
- Preceded by: Robert W. Barnwell
- Succeeded by: Robert Rhett

Member of the South Carolina Senate from St. Helena's Parish
- In office November 27, 1826 – December 18, 1830

Member of the South Carolina House of Representatives from St. Helena's Parish
- In office November 25, 1822 – December 20, 1825
- In office November 22, 1813 – December 31, 1814

Personal details
- Born: November 2, 1788 Beaufort, South Carolina
- Died: October 4, 1863 (aged 75) Newberry, South Carolina
- Resting place: Charleston, South Carolina
- Party: Nullifier
- Education: South Carolina College
- Profession: politician, poet, planter

William John Grayson (November 2, 1788 – October 4, 1863) was a U.S. representative from South Carolina. He was also a poet.

== Biography ==
Born in Beaufort, South Carolina, Grayson pursued classical studies and graduated from South Carolina College at Columbia in 1809, where he was a member of the Clariosophic Society. He then studied law and was admitted to the bar in 1822. He became a practicing lawyer in Beaufort, South Carolina.

He served as a member of the State House of Representatives from 1813 to 1815 and 1822 to 1825 and in the State Senate from 1826 to 1831. Grayson was elected commissioner in equity for Beaufort District in 1831 and resigned from the senate.

He was elected as a Nullifier to the Twenty-third and Twenty-fourth Congresses (March 4, 1833 – March 3, 1837). He then served as collector of customs at Charleston from August 9, 1841, to March 19, 1853. After his term as collector of customs, he retired to his plantation. He was a frequent contributor to the Southern Quarterly Review.

The Oxford English Dictionary credits William J. Grayson with having first used the phrase "master race" in his poem "The Hireling and the Slave" (1855); the phrase denotes the relation between the white masters and black slaves:

For these great ends hath Heaven’s supreme command
Brought the black savage from his native land,
Trains for each purpose his barbarian mind,
By slavery tamed, enlightened, and refined;
Instructs him, from a master-race, to draw
Wise modes of polity and forms of law,
Imbues his soul with faith, his heart with love,
Shapes all his life by dictates from above.

== Death ==
He died in Newberry, South Carolina, on October 4, 1863, and was interred in Magnolia Cemetery, Charleston, South Carolina.

== Bibliography ==
- The Hireling and the Slave, Chicora, and Other Poems (1856)

U.S. House of Representatives
Preceded by Robert W. Barnwell	Member of the U.S. House of Representatives from South Carolina's 2nd congressional district 1833–1837	Succeeded by Robert Rhett
