= John K. Griffin =

American politician

John King Griffin

Member of the U.S. House of Representatives from South Carolina's 9th district
- In office March 4, 1831 – March 3, 1841
- Preceded by: Starling Tucker
- Succeeded by: Patrick C. Caldwell

Member of the South Carolina Senate
- In office 1828
- In office 1820 – 1824

Member of the South Carolina House of Representatives
- In office 1816 – 1819

Personal details
- Born: August 13, 1789 Clinton, South Carolina, U.S.
- Died: August 1, 1841 (aged 51) Clinton, South Carolina, U.S.
- Party: Democratic (after 1839)
- Other political affiliations: Nullifier Party (before 1839)
- Profession: planter

John King Griffin (August 13, 1789 – August 1, 1841) was a U.S. representative from South Carolina.

Born near Clinton, South Carolina, Griffin pursued an academic course. He engaged as a planter. He served in the State house of representatives 1816–1819. He served as member of the State senate 1820–1824 and again in 1828.

Griffin was elected as a Nullifier to the Twenty-second through Twenty-fifth Congresses and reelected as a Democrat to the Twenty-sixth Congress (March 4, 1831 – March 3, 1841). He died near Clinton, South Carolina, August 1, 1841. He was interred in Little River Church Cemetery.

== Sources ==
- United States Congress. "John K. Griffin (id: G000462)". Biographical Directory of the United States Congress.

U.S. House of Representatives
Preceded by Starling Tucker	Member of the U.S. House of Representatives from South Carolina's 9th congressional district 1831 –1841	Succeeded by Patrick C. Caldwell
