= Daniel Huger =

American politician

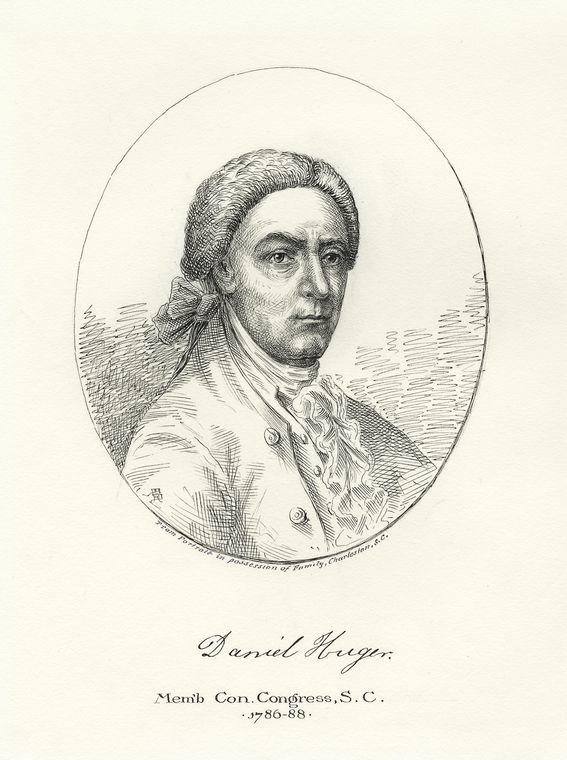

Member of the U.S. House of Representatives from South Carolina's 3rd district
- In office March 4, 1789 – March 3, 1793
- Preceded by: District established
- Succeeded by: Lemuel Benton

Delegate to the Congress of the Confederation from South Carolina
- In office November 6, 1786 – October 21, 1788

Personal details
- Born: February 20, 1742 Berkeley County, Province of South Carolina, British America
- Died: July 6, 1799 (aged 57) Charleston, South Carolina, U.S.
- Party: Pro-Administration
- Children: Daniel Elliott Huger

Daniel Huger (February 20, 1742 – July 6, 1799) was an American planter and politician who served two terms in the United States House of Representatives from Berkeley County, South Carolina from 1789 to 1793.

== Early life ==
Coat of Arms of Daniel Huger

His grandfather was Daniel Huger Sr. (1651–1711), a French Huguenot who was born in Loudun, France and settled in Charleston.

== Career ==
Daniel Huger was a delegate for South Carolina to the Continental Congress from 1786 to 1788 and a United States representative from 1789 to 1793. He owned slaves.

== Personal life ==
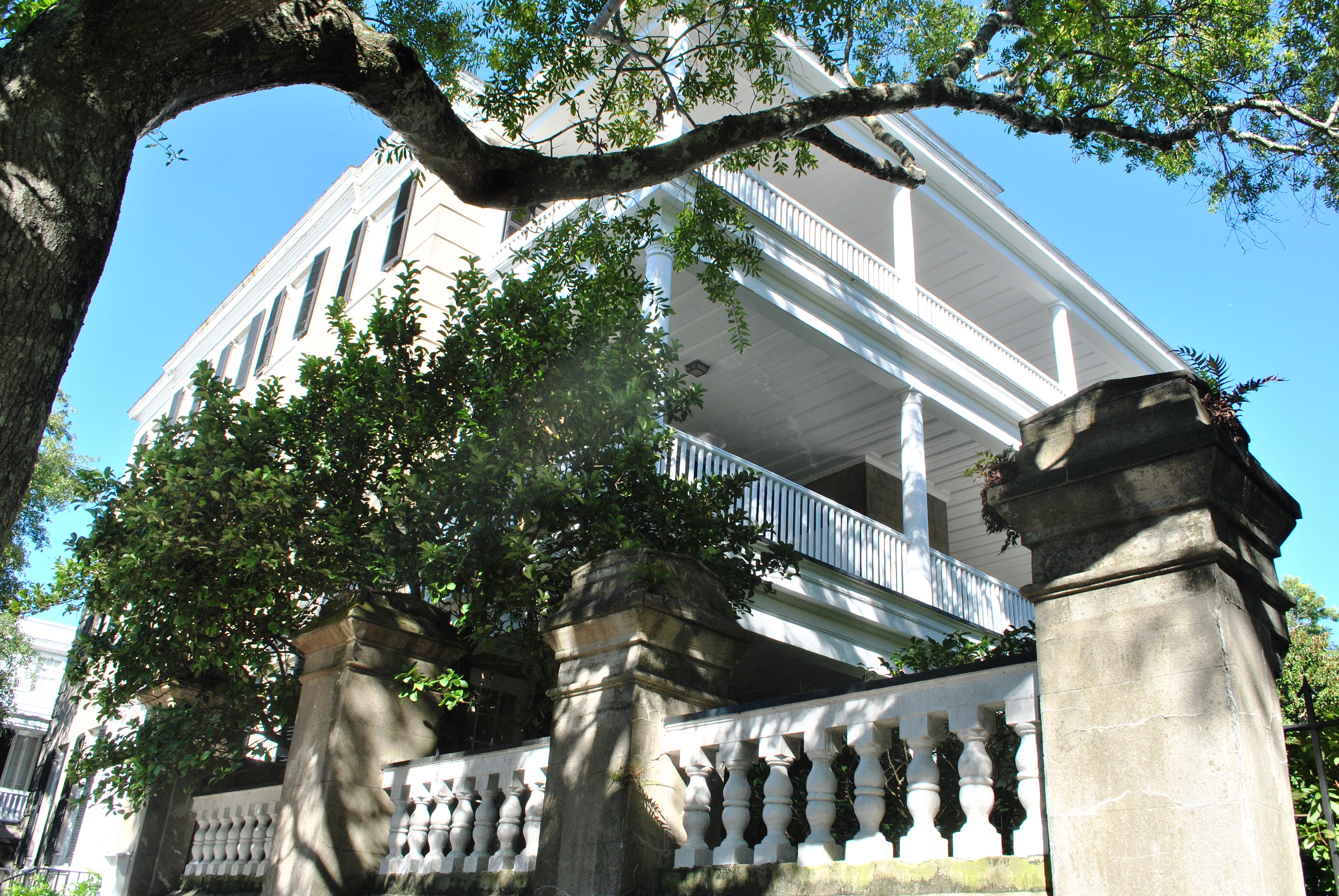
Daniel Huger House, Charleston

Daniel Huger's wife was the sister of the wife of Lewis Morris, Jr., the son of New York Congressman Lewis Morris. His son, Daniel Elliott Huger, would later serve in the United States Senate for South Carolina and marry a daughter of Arthur Middleton's.

=== Descendants ===
Mary Procter Huger, his great-granddaughter through his son Daniel, was the wife of Confederate General Arthur Middleton Manigault, who was of Huguenot descent himself; likewise, a nephew of Daniel Elliot Huger's was Confederate General Benjamin Huger.

U.S. House of Representatives
Preceded by District created	Member of the U.S. House of Representatives from South Carolina's 3rd congressional district 1789–1793	Succeeded by Lemuel Benton
