= Thomas D. Singleton =

American politician

Thomas Day Singleton

Member of the U.S. House of Representatives from South Carolina's 3rd district
- In office March 4, 1833 – November 25, 1833
- Preceded by: Thomas R. Mitchell
- Succeeded by: Robert B. Campbell

Member of the South Carolina House of Representatives
- In office 1826-1833

Personal details
- Born: unknown Kingstree, South Carolina
- Died: November 25, 1833 Raleigh, North Carolina
- Resting place: Congressional Cemetery, Washington, D.C.
- Party: Nullifier

Thomas Day Singleton (Birth date unknown – November 25, 1833) was a slaveowner and United States representative from South Carolina. He was born near Kingstree, South Carolina but his birth date is unknown.

Singleton was a member of the South Carolina House of Representatives, 1826-1833. He was elected as a Nullifier to the Twenty-third Congress and served without having qualified, from March 3, 1833, until his death in Raleigh, North Carolina, November 25, 1833, while en route to Washington, D.C. He was buried in the Congressional Cemetery, Washington, D.C.

== See also ==
- List of members of the United States Congress who died in office (1790–1899)

U.S. House of Representatives
Preceded by Thomas R. Mitchell	Member of the U.S. House of Representatives from South Carolina's 3rd congressional district 1833	Succeeded by Robert B. Campbell
