= John Myers Felder =

American politician

Member of the South Carolina Senate from Orange Parish
- In office November 23, 1840 – September 1, 1851
- Preceded by: Sanders Glover
- Succeeded by: Michael Grambling
- In office November 25, 1816 – December 18, 1819
- Preceded by: Donald Rowe
- Succeeded by: George Gilmore Salley

Member of the U.S. House of Representatives from South Carolina's 4th district
- In office March 4, 1831 – March 3, 1835
- Preceded by: William D. Martin
- Succeeded by: James H. Hammond

Member of the South Carolina House of Representatives from Orange Parish
- In office November 25, 1822 – December 20, 1823
- In office November 23, 1812 – December 16, 1815

Personal details
- Born: July 7, 1782 Orangeburg, South Carolina, U.S.
- Died: September 1, 1851 (aged 69) Orangeburg, South Carolina, U.S.
- Party: Jacksonian
- Other political affiliations: Nullifier
- Education: Yale University; Litchfield Law School
- Profession: lawyer, planter

John Myers Felder (July 7, 1782 – September 1, 1851) was a United States politician who served two terms in the U.S. House of Representatives, representing South Carolina, from 1831 to 1835.

== Biography ==
His grandfather was a native of Switzerland, came to South Carolina about 1720, and was killed during the American Revolution while defending his house against an attack by Tories. The grandson was born in the vicinity of Orangeburg, South Carolina. He graduated from Yale University in 1804, a roommate and close friend of John C. Calhoun.

=== Early career ===
After graduation, he studied at Litchfield Law School, and was admitted to the bar in 1808. He was elected to the South Carolina House of Representatives in 1812.

=== Congress ===
In 1830, he was elected to the United States House of Representatives and served in Congress for four years, first as a Jacksonian and from 1833 as a Nullifier.

=== Later career and death ===
After declining renomination in 1834, he went back to South Carolina, where the voters of Orangeburg returned him to the South Carolina House of Representatives in 1840. He served there until his death on September 1, 1851.

Felder retired from the legal profession in 1830, and became a prosperous mill owner and planter. He never married and had no children, although his sister Eliza has many descendants.

== Notes ==
U.S. House of Representatives
Preceded by William D. Martin	Member of the U.S. House of Representatives from South Carolina's 4th congressional district 1831–1835	Succeeded by James H. Hammond
