= David Rogerson Williams =

American politician (1776–1830)

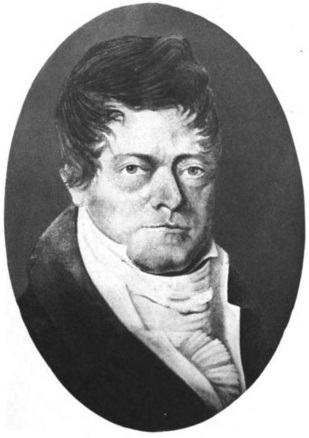

Member of the South Carolina Senate from Darlington District
- In office November 22, 1824 – November 23, 1828
- Preceded by: Rasha Cannon
- Succeeded by: John Dick Witherspoon

45th Governor of South Carolina
- In office December 10, 1814 – December 5, 1816
- Lieutenant: Robert Creswell
- Preceded by: Joseph Alston
- Succeeded by: Andrew Pickens

Member of the U.S. House of Representatives from South Carolina's 3rd district
- In office March 4, 1811 – March 3, 1813
- Preceded by: Robert Witherspoon
- Succeeded by: Theodore Gourdin
- In office March 4, 1805 – March 3, 1809
- Preceded by: Benjamin Huger
- Succeeded by: Robert Witherspoon

Personal details
- Born: March 8, 1776 Darlington County, Province of South Carolina, British America
- Died: November 17, 1830 (aged 54) Darlington County, South Carolina, U.S.
- Resting place: Darlington County, South Carolina
- Party: Democratic-Republican
- Profession: planter, lawyer, politician

Military service
- Allegiance: United States of America
- Branch/service: United States Army
- Years of service: 1813–1814
- Rank: Brigadier general
- Battles/wars: War of 1812

David Rogerson Williams (March 8, 1776 – November 17, 1830) was a representative in the United States Congress and the 45th governor of South Carolina from 1814 to 1816.

== Early life and career ==
Born in Darlington County in the Province of South Carolina, Williams was educated at schools in Wrentham, Massachusetts, and attended Rhode Island College until he withdrew in 1795. Nonetheless, after studying law he was admitted to the bar in 1797 and he practiced law in Providence, Rhode Island, for three years. Williams returned to South Carolina and became an editor of the Republican papers City Gazette and Weekly Carolina Gazette of Charleston. In 1803, Williams moved to Darlington County to engage in cotton planting and various manufacturing enterprises.

== Political career ==
Williams was elected to the United States House of Representatives in 1804 from the 3rd congressional district as a Democratic-Republican. In general, Williams was a political maverick who stressed the need for limited government while also having greater accountability to the voters. When Williams first arrived in Washington D.C., he was offered to have dinner with President Thomas Jefferson, but Williams refused because he felt that it might interfere with his independence of mind. To let the voters know how their money was being spent, Williams requested an itemization of appropriation bills rather than a lump sum, but the House voted against an itemization.

As an ardent Nationalist, Williams left the House in 1813 to participate in the War of 1812 and was appointed by President James Madison as a brigadier general in the U.S. Army. He resigned in 1814 because of personal reasons, but, despite not running for office or being present during the election, was elected later that year as Governor of South Carolina for a two-year term by the General Assembly.

== Later life and career ==
After leaving the governorship in 1816, Williams returned to Darlington County to resume his planting and manufacturing operations. He was elected in 1824 to the South Carolina Senate and served until his accidental death while superintending the construction of a bridge over Lynchs Creek on November 17, 1830. Williams was interred on Plumfield Plantation near Society Hill.

U.S. House of Representatives
Preceded by Benjamin Huger	Member of the U.S. House of Representatives from South Carolina's 3rd congressional district 1805–1809	Succeeded by Robert Witherspoon
Preceded by Robert Witherspoon	Member of the U.S. House of Representatives from South Carolina's 3rd congressional district 1811–1813	Succeeded by Theodore Gourdin
Political offices
Preceded by Joseph Alston	Governor of South Carolina; 1814–1816	Succeeded by Andrew Pickens
