= Robert B. Campbell =

American politician (1791–1862)

Robert Blair Campbell

Member of the Alabama House of Representatives from Lowndes County
- In office August 3, 1840 – August 2, 1841

Member of the U.S. House of Representatives from South Carolina's 3rd district
- In office February 27, 1834 – March 3, 1837
- Preceded by: Thomas Singleton
- Succeeded by: John Campbell
- In office March 4, 1823 – March 3, 1825
- Preceded by: Thomas R. Mitchell
- Succeeded by: Thomas R. Mitchell

Member of the South Carolina Senate from Marlboro District
- In office November 22, 1830 – December 19, 1833
- Preceded by: James Ervin
- Succeeded by: Barnabas Kelet Henagan
- In office November 25, 1822 – March 4, 1823
- Preceded by: Robertson Carloss
- Succeeded by: Charles Irby

Personal details
- Born: November 5, 1791 Woodstock Plantation, Marlboro County, South Carolina, U.S.
- Died: July 12, 1862 (aged 70) Ealing, England, U.K.
- Resting place: Kensington, London, U.K.
- Party: Democratic-Republican
- Other political affiliations: Nullifier
- Education: South Carolina College
- Profession: lawyer, politician, diplomat

Military service
- Allegiance: United States of America; South Carolina
- Branch/service: South Carolina Militia
- Years of service: 1814; 1830
- Rank: General
- Battles/wars: Nullification Crisis

Robert Blair Campbell (November 5, 1791 – July 12, 1862) was a U.S. representative from South Carolina, brother of John Campbell, also of South Carolina.

== Early life ==
Born on November 5, 1791, on Woodstock Plantation in Marlboro County, South Carolina, Campbell was educated by a private tutor. He attended school in Fayetteville, North Carolina, and graduated from South Carolina College (now the University of South Carolina) at Columbia in 1809. He engaged in agricultural pursuits. He was commissioned captain in the South Carolina Militia in 1814.

== Career and death ==
He was an unsuccessful candidate in 1820 for election to the Seventeenth Congress. He served in the South Carolina Senate from 1821 to 1823, and again from 1830 to 1833.

Campbell was elected as a Jackson Republican to the Eighteenth Congress (March 4, 1823 – March 3, 1825). He was an unsuccessful candidate for reelection in 1824 to the Nineteenth Congress and for election in 1826 to the Twentieth Congress and in 1830 to the Twenty-second Congress. Campbell was elected as a Nullifier to the Twenty-third Congress to fill the vacancy caused by the death of United States Representative Thomas B. Singleton. He was reelected as Nullifier to the Twenty-fourth Congress and served from February 27, 1834, to March 3, 1837. During the nullification movement he was commissioned general of South Carolina troops in 1833.

He moved to Lowndes County, Alabama, about 1840. He served as member of the State house of representatives in 1840. He was appointed on September 28, 1842, consul at Habana, Cuba, and served until July 22, 1850. From there, he moved to San Antonio, Texas. He was appointed on March 16, 1853, a commissioner for the United States to aid in settlement of the disputed boundary line between Texas and Mexico.

He was appointed consul at London, England, and served from August 3, 1854, to March 1861, when he was recalled. He moved to Ealing, where he died July 12, 1862. He was interred in the crypt of Kensington Church.

== Sources ==
- United States Congress. "Robert B. Campbell (id: C000098)". Biographical Directory of the United States Congress.

U.S. House of Representatives
Preceded by Thomas R. Mitchell	Member of the U.S. House of Representatives from South Carolina's 3rd congressional district 1821–1823	Succeeded by Thomas R. Mitchell
Preceded by Thomas Singleton	Member of the U.S. House of Representatives from South Carolina's 3rd congressional district 1834–1837	Succeeded by John Campbell
