= Franklin H. Elmore =

American politician

Franklin Harper Elmore
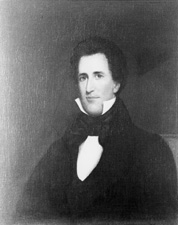
- In office April 11, 1850 – May 29, 1850
- Appointed by: Whitemarsh Benjamin Seabrook
- Preceded by: John C. Calhoun
- Succeeded by: Robert W. Barnwell

Member of the U.S. House of Representatives from South Carolina's 4th district
- In office December 10, 1836 – March 3, 1839
- Preceded by: James H. Hammond
- Succeeded by: Sampson H. Butler

Personal details
- Born: October 15, 1799 Laurens District, South Carolina
- Died: May 29, 1850 (aged 50) Washington, D.C.
- Resting place: Columbia, South Carolina
- Party: Democratic
- Other political affiliations: Nullifier
- Parent: John Archer Elmore (father)
- Education: South Carolina College
- Profession: Politician, Lawyer

Franklin Harper Elmore (October 15, 1799 – May 29, 1850) was a United States representative and senator from South Carolina.

== Life and career ==
Born in Laurens District, the son of John Archer Elmore, he graduated from the South Carolina College at Columbia in 1819, studied law, was admitted to the bar in 1821 and commenced practice in Walterboro.

=== Early career ===
He was solicitor for the southern circuit from 1822 to 1836, a colonel on the staff of the state governor from 1824 to 1826, and was elected as a State Rights Democrat to the 24th United States Congress to fill the vacancy caused by the resignation of James H. Hammond.

=== Congress ===
Elmore was reelected to the 25th Congress and served from December 10, 1836, to March 4, 1839. From 1839 to 1850, he was president of the Bank of the State of South Carolina 1839–50; he declined appointment by President James Polk as Minister to Great Britain.

=== Senate ===
Elmore was appointed as a Democrat to the U.S. Senate to fill the vacancy caused by the death of John C. Calhoun and served from April 11, 1850, until his death.

=== Death and burial ===
He died in Washington, D.C., in 1850. He was interred in the First Presbyterian Churchyard in Columbia.

== See also ==
- List of members of the United States Congress who died in office (1790–1899)

U.S. House of Representatives
| Preceded by James H. Hammond | Member of the U.S. House of Representatives from South Carolina's 4th congressional district 1836–1839 | Succeeded by Sampson H. Butler |
U.S. Senate
| Preceded by John C. Calhoun | U.S. senator (Class 2) from South Carolina; 1850; Served alongside: Andrew P. Butler | Succeeded by Robert W. Barnwell |
