= James Ervin (politician) =

American politician

Member of the South Carolina Senate from Marlboro District
- In office November 27, 1826 – December 18, 1829
- Preceded by: Charles Irby
- Succeeded by: Robert B. Campbell

Member of the U.S. House of Representatives from 's 3rd district
- In office March 4, 1817 – March 3, 1821
- Preceded by: Benjamin Huger
- Succeeded by: Thomas R. Mitchell

Member of the South Carolina House of Representatives from Marion District
- In office November 26, 1810 – August 29, 1812
- In office November 24, 1800 – December 15, 1805

Personal details
- Born: October 17, 1778 Williamsburg District, South Carolina
- Died: July 7, 1841 (aged 62) Darlington, South Carolina
- Resting place: Darlington, SC
- Party: Democratic-Republican
- Education: Rhode Island College
- Profession: planter, lawyer, politician

James Ervin (October 17, 1778 – July 7, 1841) was an American lawyer and politician who served two terms as a U.S. representative from South Carolina from 1817 to 1821.

== Early life ==
Born in Williamsburg District, Ervin graduated from Rhode Island College (now Brown University), in 1797. He studied law and was admitted to the bar in 1800. He commenced practice in the Pee Dee region of South Carolina.

== Career ==
He served as member of the State house of representatives from 1800 to 1804 and from 1810 to 1811. He then served as solicitor of the northern judicial circuit from 1804 to 1816. He was a trustee of South Carolina College from 1809 to 1817.

=== Congress ===
Ervin was elected as a Democratic-Republican to the Fifteenth Congress and reelected to the Sixteenth Congress (March 4, 1817 – March 3, 1821). He declined to be a candidate for renomination in 1820.

=== Later career and death ===
After his tenure in Congress, he engaged in agricultural pursuits. He later served as member of the State senate from 1826 to 1829. He was a delegate to the State convention in 1832.

He died in Darlington, South Carolina, July 7, 1841 and was interred at his home.

== Sources ==
- United States Congress. "James Ervin (id: E000209)". Biographical Directory of the United States Congress.

U.S. House of Representatives
Preceded by Benjamin Huger	Member of the U.S. House of Representatives from South Carolina's 3rd congressional district 1817–1821	Succeeded by Thomas R. Mitchell
