= Patrick C. Caldwell =

American politician

Patrick Calhoun Caldwell

Member of the U.S. House of Representatives from South Carolina's 9th district
- In office March 4, 1841 – March 3, 1843
- Preceded by: John K. Griffin
- Succeeded by: District abolished

Member of the South Carolina Senate
- In office 1848

Member of the South Carolina House of Representatives
- In office 1838 – 1839

Personal details
- Born: March 10, 1801 Newberry, South Carolina
- Died: November 22, 1855 (aged 54)
- Party: Democratic
- Education: South Carolina College
- Profession: attorney

Patrick Calhoun Caldwell (March 10, 1801 – November 22, 1855) was a U.S. representative from South Carolina.

Born near Newberry, South Carolina, Caldwell studied at South Carolina College (now the University of South Carolina), graduating in 1820. He then studied law. He was admitted to the bar in 1822 and commenced practice in South Carolina.

He served as a member of the South Carolina State House of Representatives 1838–1839.

Caldwell was elected as a Democrat to the Twenty-seventh Congress (March 4, 1841 – March 3, 1843). He was an unsuccessful candidate for reelection to the Twenty-eighth Congress. He served in the South Carolina State Senate in 1848. He died in South Carolina on November 22, 1855.

== Sources ==
- United States Congress. "Patrick C. Caldwell (id: C000039)". Biographical Directory of the United States Congress.

U.S. House of Representatives
Preceded by John K. Griffin	Member of the U.S. House of Representatives from South Carolina's 9th congressional district 1841 – 1843	Succeeded by District abolished
