= Nullifier Party =

American political party

State Rights and Free Trade Party
- Other name: Nullifier Party (pejorative); State Rights and Jackson Party (1830–31)
- Manager: James Hamilton Jr.
- Founders: John C. Calhoun; James Hamilton Jr.; George McDuffie
- Founded: 1830; 196 years ago
- Dissolved: 1840; 186 years ago
- Split from: Jackson Party
- Merged into: Democratic Party
- Ideology: Free trade; Nullification; Proslavery (US); State rights
- National affiliation: Whig Party (1833–37); Democratic Party (after 1837)
- U.S. Senate: 2 / 48 (1833, peak)
- U.S. House: 7 / 240 (1833, peak)

The State Rights and Free Trade Party, commonly known as the Nullifier Party, was a political party in Antebellum South Carolina. It was one of two main political parties in South Carolina during the 1830s, alongside the Union Party. The party defended the legal theory of nullification, which held that states could unilaterally declare federal laws unconstitutional.

John C. Calhoun anonymously published the South Carolina Exposition and Protest in response to the Tariff of Abominations, which dramatically increased the rate of tax on imported raw materials. The Exposition went beyond the earlier Kentucky and Virginia Resolutions in asserting the right of the states to nullify unconstitutional laws. Calhoun claimed that the severe harm done by the tariff to South Carolina's plantation economy justified the step of nullification. Calhoun's ideas were notable for their proslavery emphasis; likeminded contemporaries portrayed the tariff as an abolitionist conspiracy and a vital threat to the planter class. While Calhoun made a formal distinction between nullification and secession, opponents accused him of advocating disunion.

Nullifiers outperformed expectations in the 1830 legislative elections, holding the Unionists to narrow majorities in six contested Charleston districts. Local associations were established in every district and parish the following year, largely through the efforts of Calhoun's associate James Hamilton Jr., the manager of the state party. Nullifiers held a more than two-thirds supermajority in the South Carolina General Assembly after the 1832 elections, which were marked by significant political violence. The party was strongest in the South Carolina Lowcountry. In Charleston, Nullifiers drew support from planters outside the economic and political establishment, as well as merchants, brokers, and laborers employed in economic sectors tied to the export trade. New voters after 1830 overwhelmingly favored the Nullifiers, reflecting the party's appeal with young voters.

Nullifier control of the legislature was important during the nullification crisis, enabling Hamilton to call the state convention that nullified the tariffs of 1828 and 1832. The party subsequently sought legislation to require that state officials swear "primary and paramount allegiance" to South Carolina. Nullifiers articulated a "proslavery, antidemocratic discourse" that was foundational to Southern nationalism in subsequent decades. Congressional Nullifiers were instrumental in securing adoption of the gag rule by the United States House of Representatives; Calhoun rejected the measure as insufficiently extreme and helped to drive its author, Henry L. Pinckney, out of the Nullifier Party. Fear of slave rebellions propelled by the growth of the abolitionist movement in the Northern United States led Nullifiers to demand further suppression of antislavery literature in the later part of the 1830s.

Nullifiers first aligned with the Whig Party in the formation of the Second Party System. South Carolina was the only state to appoint its electors by a vote of the legislature during the 1830s; the Nullifier-controlled General Assembly declined to endorse either major party presidential candidate in 1832 and 1836, instead casting protest votes for John Floyd of Virginia and Willie P. Mangum of North Carolina. After 1837, Calhoun and other leading Nullifiers switched their allegiance to the Democrats. The Nullifier and Union parties merged in 1840 amidst the decline of Unionism in South Carolina preceding the American Civil War.

== Electoral history ==
=== Presidential tickets ===
Election	Ticket		Electoral results			
Election	Presidential nominee	Running mate	Popular vote	Electoral votes	Change	Result
1832	John Floyd	Henry Lee	0.00%	11 / 286	▲11	Lost
1836	No candidate (Note: The legislative caucus of the Nullifier Party instructed South Carolina's electors to cast a blank vote for president, but instead the electors voted for Willie P. Mangum.)	John Tyler	0.00%	11 / 294	Steady	Lost

=== Congressional representation ===
Congress	House of Representatives				Senate			
Congress	Election	Seats	Change	Percent	Election	Seats	Change	Percent
22nd	1830–31	4 / 213	▲4	1.88	1830–31	2 / 48	▲2	4.17
23rd	1832–33	7 / 240	▲3	2.92	1832–33	2 / 48	Steady	4.17
24th	1834–35	7 / 241	Steady	2.90	1834–35	2 / 52	Steady	3.85
25th	1836–37	2 / 242	▼5	0.82	1836–37	0 / 52	▼2	0.00

== Other prominent members ==
- Robert Woodward Barnwell
- Elihu H. Bay
- John C. Calhoun
- John Campbell
- Robert B. Campbell
- William K. Clowney
- Warren R. Davis
- Franklin H. Elmore
- John Myers Felder
- William J. Grayson
- John K. Griffin
- James Hamilton Jr.
- William Harper
- James Henry Hammond
- Robert Y. Hayne
- John Hemphill
- Hugh S. Legaré
- Basil Manly Sr.
- George McDuffie
- Stephen Decatur Miller
- Francis Wilkinson Pickens
- Henry L. Pinckney
- William C. Preston
- Samuel Prioleau
- Whitemarsh Benjamin Seabrook
- Thomas D. Singleton
- Waddy Thompson Jr.
- Robert James Turnbull

== Bibliography ==
- Carpenter, Daniel (2021). Democracy by Petition: Popular Politics in Transformation, 1790–1870. Cambridge: Harvard University Press. p. 312. ISBN 978-0-674-24749-9.
- Dubin, Michael J. (March 1, 1998). United States Congressional Elections, 1788–1997: The Official Results of the Elections of the 1st through 105th Congresses. Jefferson, N.C.: McFarland and Company. ISBN 978-0-7864-0283-0.
- Dubin, Michael J. (2002). United States Presidential Elections, 1788–1860: The Official Results by State and County. Jefferson, NC: McFarland & Co.
- Freehling, William W. (1968). Prelude to Civil War: The Nullification Controversy in South Carolina, 1816–1836. New York: Harper Torchbooks.
- Holt, Michael F. (1992). Political Parties and American Political Development from the Age of Jackson to the Age of Lincoln. Baton Rouge: Louisiana State University Press. ISBN 978-0-8071-1728-6.
- Holt, Michael F. (1999). The Rise and Fall of the American Whig Party: Jacksonian Politics and the Coming of the Civil War. New York: Oxford University Press. ISBN 978-0-19-505544-3.
- Howe, Daniel Walker (2007). What Hath God Wrought: The Transformation of America, 1815–1848. New York: Oxford University Press. ISBN 978-0-19-507894-7.
- Paulus, Carl Lawrence (2017). The Slaveholding Crisis: Fear of Insurrection and the Coming of the Civil War. Baton Rouge: Louisiana State University Press. p. 125. ISBN 978-0-8071-6436-5.
- Pease, Jan H.; Pease, William H. (August 1981). "The Economics and Politics of Charleston's Nullification Crisis". Journal of Southern History. 47 (3): 335–62. doi:10.2307/2207798. JSTOR 2207798.
- Sinha, Manisha (2000). The Counterrevolution of Slavery: Politics and Ideology in Antebellum South Carolina. Chapel Hill: University of North Carolina Press.
- Tinkler, Robert (2004). James Hamilton of South Carolina. Baton Rouge: Louisiana State University Press. ISBN 978-0-8071-2936-4.
