= William D. Martin =

American politician

William Dickinson Martin

Member of the U.S. House of Representatives from South Carolina's 4th district
- In office March 4, 1827 – March 3, 1831
- Preceded by: Andrew R. Govan
- Succeeded by: John M. Felder

Member of the South Carolina House of Representatives from St. Luke's Parish
- In office November 25, 1816 – December 18, 1817

Personal details
- Born: October 20, 1789 Martintown, Edgefield District, South Carolina
- Died: November 17, 1833 (aged 44) Charleston, South Carolina
- Resting place: Charleston, South Carolina
- Party: Jacksonian
- Education: Litchfield Law School
- Profession: lawyer, judge

William Dickinson Martin (October 20, 1789 – November 17, 1833) was an American politician who served two terms as a U.S. representative from South Carolina from 1827 to 1831.

== Biography ==
Born in Martintown, Edgefield District, South Carolina, Martin pursued an academic course. He studied law at Edgefield and attended the Litchfield Law School. He was admitted to the bar in 1811 and commenced practice in Edgefield, South Carolina, the same year.

=== Early political career ===
He moved to Coosawhatchie, Beaufort County, in 1813. He served as member of the State house of representatives for St. Luke's Parish 1816–1817. He served as clerk of the State senate 1818–1826.

=== Congress ===
Martin was elected as a Jacksonian to the Twentieth and Twenty-first Congresses (March 4, 1827 – March 3, 1831).

=== Later career and death ===
He served as judge of the circuit courts of law and appeal 1831–1833.

He moved to Columbia, South Carolina, where he resided until his death in Charleston, South Carolina, November 17, 1833. He was interred in the churchyard cemetery of St. Michael's Church.

== Sources ==
- United States Congress. "William D. Martin (id: M000202)". Biographical Directory of the United States Congress.

U.S. House of Representatives
Preceded by Andrew R. Govan	Member of the U.S. House of Representatives from South Carolina's 4th congressional district 1827–1831	Succeeded by John M. Felder
