= David R. Evans (South Carolina politician) =

American politician

David Read Evans

Member of the South Carolina Senate from Fairfield District
- In office November 22, 1824 – November 26, 1832
- Preceded by: Samuel Johnston
- Succeeded by: Austin Ford Peay

Member of the U.S. House of Representatives from South Carolina's 5th district
- In office March 4, 1813 – March 3, 1815
- Preceded by: Richard Winn
- Succeeded by: William Woodward

Member of the South Carolina House of Representatives from Fairfield District
- In office November 22, 1802 – November 30, 1805
- Preceded by: Thomas Means
- Succeeded by: Samuel Alston

Personal details
- Born: February 20, 1769 Westminster, England, Kingdom of Great Britain
- Died: March 8, 1843 (aged 74) Winnsboro, South Carolina, U.S.
- Resting place: Winnsboro, South Carolina
- Party: Democratic-Republican
- Education: Mount Zion College
- Profession: Lawyer

David Read Evans (February 20, 1769 – March 8, 1843) was a U.S. representative from South Carolina and a slaveholder.

Born in Westminster, England, Evans immigrated to the United States in 1784 with his father, who settled in South Carolina. He attended Mount Zion College and studied law, being admitted to the bar in 1796. Evans began practicing law in Winnsboro and served in the South Carolina House of Representatives from 1802 to 1805. He was the solicitor of the middle judicial circuit from 1804 to 1811.

Evans was elected as a Democratic-Republican to the Thirteenth Congress, serving from March 4, 1813, to March 3, 1815. After declining to seek reelection, he returned to his plantation. He later served in the South Carolina Senate from 1824 to 1832 and was the first president of the Fairfield Bible Society.

Evans died in Winnsboro, South Carolina, on March 8, 1843, and was initially interred at a private residence in Winnsboro. His burial site is now the Bethel A.R.P. Cemetery on North Vanderhorst Street, Winnsboro, SC.

== Sources ==
- United States Congress. "David R. Evans (id: E000238)". Biographical Directory of the United States Congress.

U.S. House of Representatives
Preceded by Richard Winn	Member of the U.S. House of Representatives from South Carolina's 5th congressional district 1813–1815	Succeeded by William Woodward
