= Sampson H. Butler =

American politician

Sampson Hale Butler

Member of the U.S. House of Representatives from South Carolina's 4th district
- In office March 4, 1839 – September 27, 1842
- Preceded by: Franklin H. Elmore
- Succeeded by: Samuel W. Trotti

Member of the South Carolina House of Representatives from Barnwell District
- In office November 26, 1832 – December 19, 1835

Personal details
- Born: January 3, 1803 Edgefield District, South Carolina
- Died: March 16, 1848 (aged 45) Tallahassee, Florida
- Resting place: Tallahassee, Florida
- Party: Democratic
- Education: South Carolina College
- Profession: lawyer

Sampson Hale Butler (January 3, 1803 – March 16, 1848) was a U.S. representative from South Carolina.

Born near Ninety Six, Edgefield District, South Carolina, Butler attended the country schools and South Carolina College (now the University of South Carolina) at Columbia. He studied law. He was admitted to the bar in 1825 and commenced practice in Edgefield, South Carolina.

He moved to Barnwell, South Carolina, and continued the practice of law. Sheriff of Barnwell County 1832–1839, he then served as member of the State house of representatives from 1832 to 1835.

Butler was elected as a Democrat to the Twenty-sixth and Twenty-seventh Congresses and served from March 4, 1839, until September 27, 1842, when he resigned.

He resumed the practice of law. He moved to Florida and died in Tallahassee, Florida, March 16, 1848. He was interred in a cemetery in that city.

== Sources ==
- United States Congress. "Sampson H. Butler (id: B001189)". Biographical Directory of the United States Congress.

U.S. House of Representatives
Preceded by Franklin H. Elmore	Member of the U.S. House of Representatives from South Carolina's 4th congressional district 1839–1842	Succeeded by Samuel W. Trotti
