= Joseph A. Woodward =

American politician

Joseph Addison Woodward
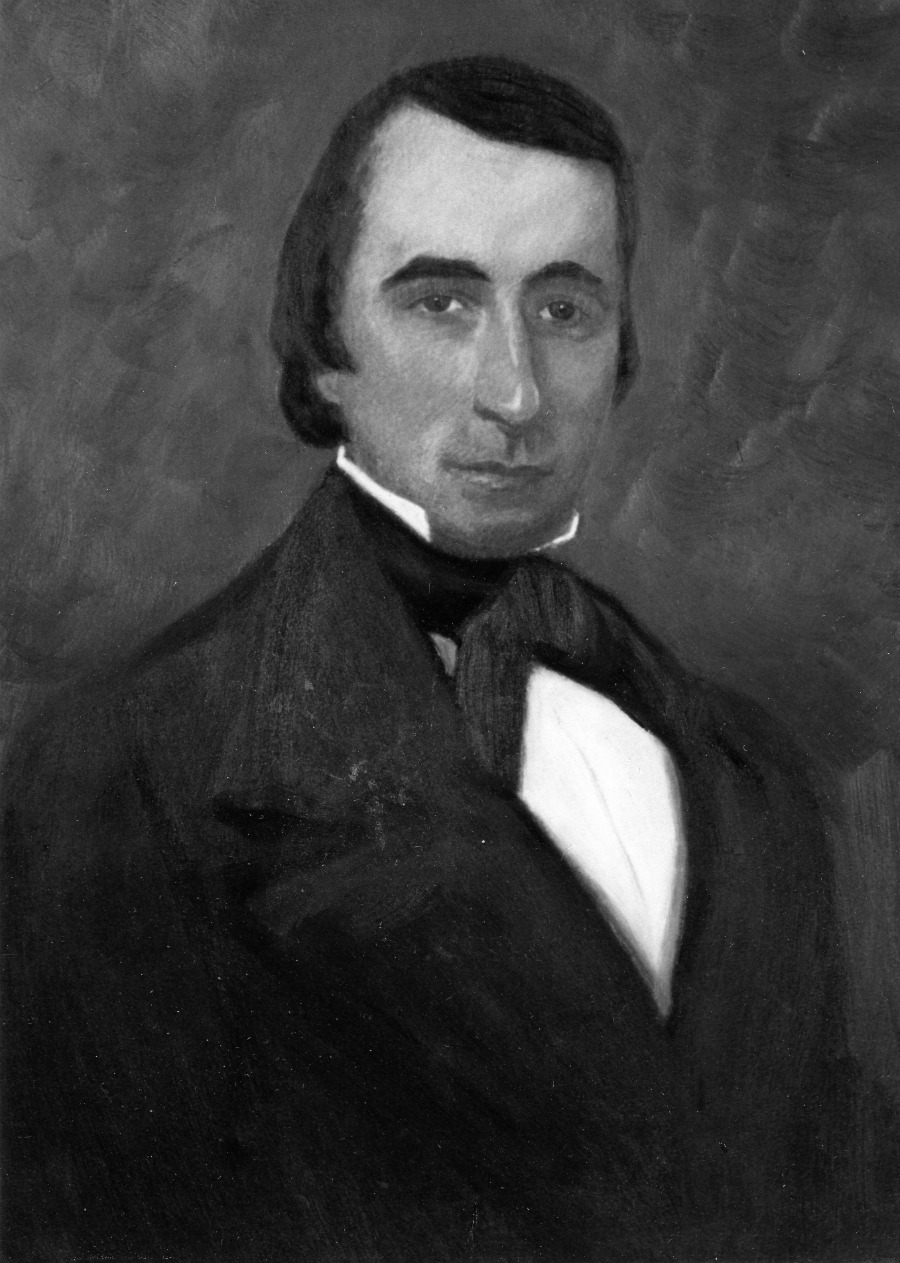
- Joseph Woodward

Member of the U.S. House of Representatives from South Carolina's 3rd district
- In office March 4, 1843 – March 3, 1853
- Preceded by: John Campbell
- Succeeded by: Laurence M. Keitt

Member of the South Carolina House of Representatives from Fairfield District
- In office November 23, 1840 – December 17, 1841
- In office November 24, 1834 – December 19, 1835

Personal details
- Born: April 11, 1806 Winnsboro, South Carolina
- Died: August 3, 1885 (aged 79) Talladega, Alabama
- Resting place: Talladega, Alabama
- Party: Democratic
- Education: University of South Carolina
- Profession: lawyer

Joseph Addison Woodward (April 11, 1806 – August 3, 1885) was an American politician who served as a U.S. Representative from South Carolina.

He was son of William Woodward. Planter, militia officer, and memoirist Thomas S. Woodward was his cousin.

Born in Winnsboro, South Carolina, Woodward received an academic training and graduated from the University of South Carolina at Columbia. He was admitted to the bar and practiced law.

Woodward served as member of the State house of representatives from 1834 to 1835 from 1840 to 1841.

Woodward was elected as a Democrat to the Twenty-eighth and to the four succeeding Congresses (March 4, 1843 – March 3, 1853). He declined to be a candidate for reelection in 1852 to the Thirty-third Congress.

He relocated to Alabama and resumed his legal career after leaving Congress.

Woodward was a slave owner.

He died in Talladega, Alabama, on August 3, 1885. He was interred in Oak Hill Cemetery.

== Sources ==
- United States Congress. "Joseph A. Woodward (id: W000732)". Biographical Directory of the United States Congress.

U.S. House of Representatives
Preceded by John Campbell	Member of the U.S. House of Representatives from South Carolina's 3rd congressional district 1843–1853	Succeeded by Laurence M. Keitt
