= Starling Tucker =

American politician

Member of the U.S. House of Representatives from South Carolina
- In office March 4, 1817 – March 4, 1831
- Preceded by: William Woodward
- Succeeded by: John K. Griffin
- Constituency: 5th district (1817–1823); 9th district (1823–1831)

Member of the South Carolina Senate from Laurens District
- In office November 24, 1806 – December 20, 1816
- Preceded by: James Saxon
- Succeeded by: William Clark

Member of the South Carolina House of Representatives from Laurens District
- In office November 24, 1801 – November 24, 1806

Personal details
- Born: 1770 Halifax County, Province of North Carolina, British America
- Died: January 3, 1834 (aged 63–64) Mountain Shoals, South Carolina, U.S.
- Resting place: Enoree, South Carolina
- Party: Jacksonian
- Other political affiliations: Democratic-Republican

Starling Tucker (1770 – January 3, 1834) was a U.S. representative from South Carolina. Born in Halifax County in the Province of North Carolina, Tucker moved to Mountain Shoals, South Carolina (now Enoree). He received a limited education.

Tucker held several local offices and served as member of the South Carolina House of Representatives. Tucker was elected as a Democratic-Republican to the Fifteenth Congress. He was reelected to the Sixteenth through Nineteenth Congresses and reelected as a Jacksonian to the Twentieth and Twenty-first Congresses (March 4, 1817 – March 3, 1831). He died in Mountain Shoals (now Enoree), South Carolina, January 3, 1834. He was interred in the private burial ground on the family estate west of Enoree, South Carolina.

== Sources ==
- United States Congress. "Starling Tucker (id: T000402)". Biographical Directory of the United States Congress.

U.S. House of Representatives
Preceded by William Woodward	Member of the U.S. House of Representatives from South Carolina's 5th congressional district 1817–1823	Succeeded by George McDuffie
Preceded by James Carter	Member of the U.S. House of Representatives from South Carolina's 9th congressional district 1823–1831	Succeeded by John K. Griffin
