= Samuel W. Trotti =

American politician

Samuel Wilds Trotti

Member of the South Carolina House of Representatives from Barnwell District
- In office November 22, 1852 – December 19, 1855
- In office November 23, 1840 – December 17, 1841

Member of the U.S. House of Representatives from South Carolina's 4th district
- In office December 17, 1842 – March 3, 1843
- Preceded by: Sampson H. Butler
- Succeeded by: John Campbell

Personal details
- Born: July 18, 1810 Barnwell, South Carolina
- Died: June 24, 1856 (aged 45) Buckhead, Fairfield District, South Carolina
- Party: Democratic
- Education: South Carolina College
- Profession: lawyer

Samuel Wilds Trotti (July 18, 1810 – June 24, 1856) was a U.S. representative from South Carolina.

Born in Barnwell, South Carolina, Trotti attended the common schools. He graduated from South Carolina College (now University of South Carolina) at Columbia in 1832. He studied law and was admitted to the bar. He served in the Seminole War.

Trotti served as member of the State house of representatives from 1840 to 1841 from 1852 to 1855. He was elected as a Democrat to the Twenty-seventh Congress to fill the vacancy caused by the resignation of Sampson H. Butler and served from December 17, 1842, to March 3, 1843.

He resumed the practice of law. He died in Buckhead, Fairfield District (now county), South Carolina, June 24, 1856.

== Sources ==
- United States Congress. "Samuel W. Trotti (id: T000381)". Biographical Directory of the United States Congress.

U.S. House of Representatives
Preceded by Sampson H. Butler	Member of the U.S. House of Representatives from South Carolina's 4th congressional district 1842–1843	Succeeded by John Campbell
