= Thomas R. Mitchell =

American politician (1783–1837)

Thomas Rothmaler Mitchell

Member of the U.S. House of Representatives from South Carolina's 3rd district
- In office March 4, 1831 – March 3, 1833
- Preceded by: John Campbell
- Succeeded by: Thomas Singleton
- In office March 4, 1825 – March 3, 1829
- Preceded by: Robert B. Campbell
- Succeeded by: John Campbell
- In office March 4, 1821 – March 3, 1823
- Preceded by: James Ervin
- Succeeded by: Robert B. Campbell

Member of the South Carolina House of Representatives from Georgetown District
- In office November 28, 1814 – December 18, 1819

Member of the South Carolina House of Representatives from Horry District
- In office November 29, 1809 – December 19, 1809

Personal details
- Born: May 1783 Georgetown, South Carolina
- Died: November 2, 1837 (aged 54) Georgetown, South Carolina
- Party: Democratic-Republican
- Other political affiliations: Jacksonian
- Education: Harvard University
- Profession: lawyer, politician

Thomas Rothmaler Mitchell (May 1783 – November 2, 1837) was an early 19th-century American lawyer and politician who served as a U.S. representative from South Carolina.

== Biography ==
Born in Georgetown, South Carolina, in May 1783, Mitchell graduated from Harvard University in 1802, where he studied law. He was admitted to the bar in 1808, and commenced practice in Georgetown, South Carolina.

=== State legislature ===
He served as member of the state house of representatives in 1809 and from 1814 to 1819.

=== Congress ===
Mitchell was elected as a Democratic-Republican to the Seventeenth Congress (March 4, 1821 – March 3, 1823). He was an unsuccessful candidate for reelection in 1822 to the Eighteenth Congress. He was then elected as a Jacksonian to the Nineteenth and Twentieth Congresses (March 4, 1825 – March 3, 1829). He was an unsuccessful candidate for reelection in 1828 to the Twenty-first Congress.

He was reelected as a Jacksonian to the Twenty-second Congress (March 4, 1831– March 3, 1833). He was an unsuccessful candidate for reelection in 1832 to the Twenty-third Congress.

=== Death ===
He died in Georgetown, South Carolina, November 2, 1837.

U.S. House of Representatives
Preceded by James Ervin	Member of the U.S. House of Representatives from South Carolina's 3rd congressional district 1821–1823	Succeeded by Robert B. Campbell
Preceded by Robert B. Campbell	Member of the U.S. House of Representatives from South Carolina's 3rd congressional district 1825–1829	Succeeded by John Campbell
Preceded by John Campbell	Member of the U.S. House of Representatives from South Carolina's 3rd congressional district 1831–1833	Succeeded by Thomas Singleton

== Sources ==
- United States Congress. "Thomas R. Mitchell (id: M000829)". Biographical Directory of the United States Congress.
