= Benjamin Huger (politician) =

American politician

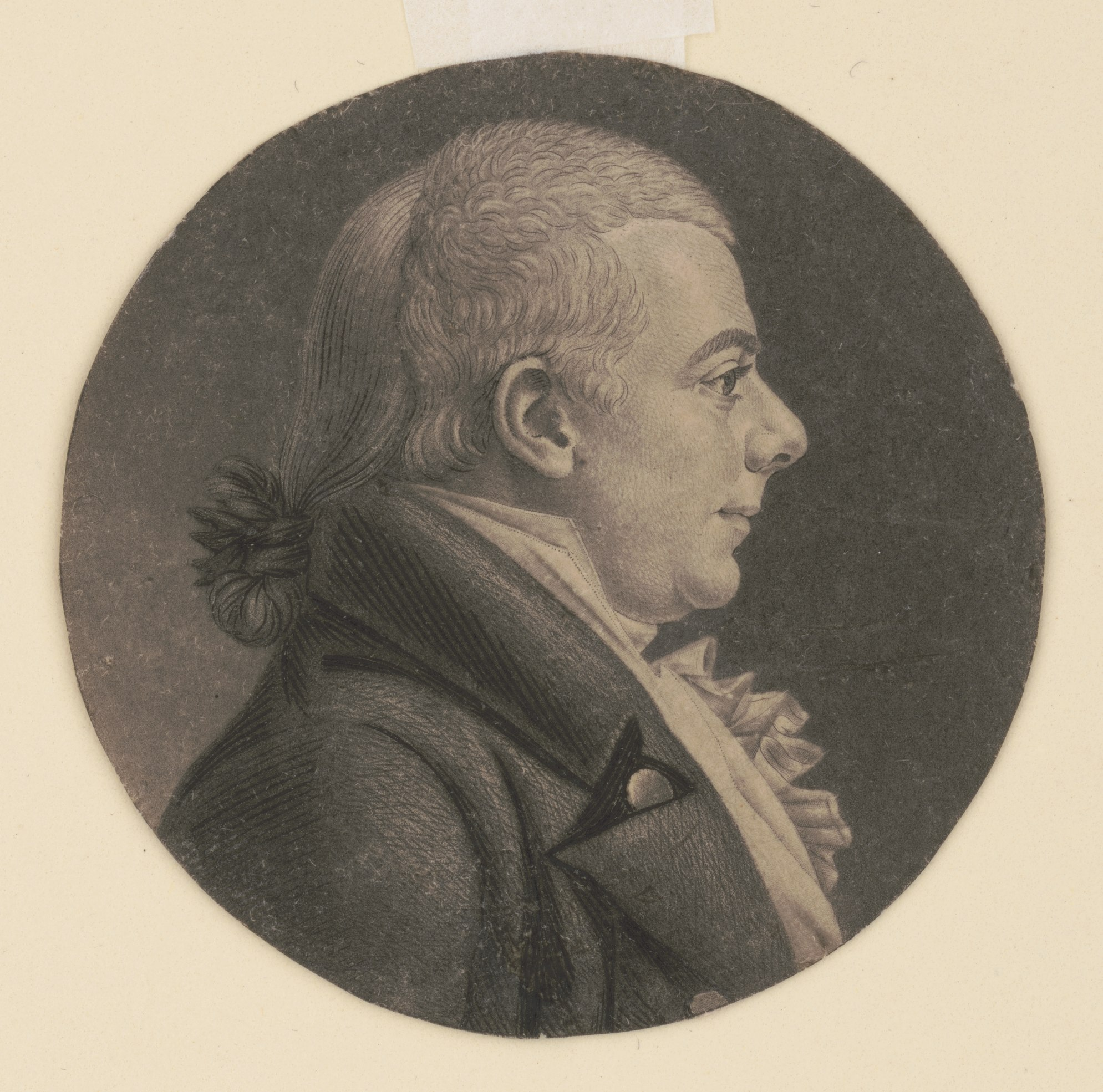

President of the South Carolina Senate
- In office November 23, 1818 – December 20, 1821
- Governor: Andrew Pickens; John Geddes; Thomas Bennett, Jr.
- Preceded by: John Lyde Wilson
- Succeeded by: Jacob B. I'On

Member of the South Carolina Senate from All Saints Parish
- In office November 23, 1818 – July 7, 1823
- Preceded by: Francis Kinloch Huger
- Succeeded by: William Amis Dillard Bryan

Member of the U.S. House of Representatives from South Carolina's 3rd district
- In office March 4, 1815 – March 3, 1817
- Preceded by: Theodore Gourdin
- Succeeded by: James Ervin
- In office March 4, 1799 – March 3, 1805
- Preceded by: Lemuel Benton
- Succeeded by: David R. Williams

Member of the South Carolina House of Representatives from Prince George's, Winyah Parish
- In office November 15, 1813 – December 24, 1813
- In office November 24, 1806 – August 29, 1812
- In office November 28, 1796 – December 16, 1797

Personal details
- Born: 1768 Charleston County, Province of South Carolina, British America
- Died: July 7, 1823 (aged 54–55) near Georgetown, South Carolina, U.S.
- Party: Federalist
- Profession: planter, politician

Benjamin Huger (1768 – July 7, 1823) was an American farmer and politician who served as a United States representative from South Carolina, serving three terms from 1799 to 1805, and a fourth term from 1815 to 1817.

== Biography ==
Born at or near Charleston in the Province of South Carolina in 1768, he pursued an academic course and engaged in the cultivation of rice on the Waccamaw River.

=== Elected office ===
He was a member of the South Carolina House of Representatives from 1796 to 1798, and was elected as a Federalist to the Sixth, Seventh, and Eighth U.S. Congresses, serving from March 4, 1799 to March 3, 1805.

He was again a member of the State house of representatives from 1806 to 1813, and was then elected to the Fourteenth U.S. Congress, serving from March 4, 1815 to March 3, 1817.

He was a member of the South Carolina Senate from 1818 to 1823 and served as its president from 1819 to 1822.

== Death ==
He died on his estate on Waccamaw River, near Georgetown, South Carolina; interment was in All Saints' Churchyard.

U.S. House of Representatives
Preceded by Lemuel Benton	Member of the U.S. House of Representatives from South Carolina's 3rd congressional district 1799–1805	Succeeded by David R. Williams
Preceded by Theodore Gourdin	Member of the U.S. House of Representatives from South Carolina's 3rd congressional district 1815–1817	Succeeded by James Ervin
