= Robert Woodward Barnwell =

American politician (1801–1882)

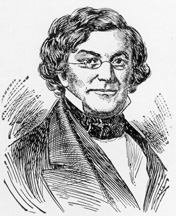

Confederate States Senator from South Carolina
- In office February 18, 1862 – May 10, 1865
- Preceded by: Position established
- Succeeded by: Position abolished

United States Senator from South Carolina
- In office June 4, 1850 – December 8, 1850
- Appointed by: Whitemarsh Benjamin Seabrook
- Preceded by: Franklin Elmore
- Succeeded by: Robert Rhett

Member of the U.S. House of Representatives from South Carolina's 2nd district
- In office March 4, 1829 – March 3, 1833
- Preceded by: James Hamilton
- Succeeded by: William Grayson

Member of the South Carolina House of Representatives from Prince William's Parish
- In office November 27, 1826 – January 30, 1828

Personal details
- Born: August 10, 1801 Beaufort, South Carolina
- Died: November 5, 1882 (aged 81) Columbia, South Carolina
- Party: Democratic
- Education: Beaufort College; Harvard University

Robert Woodward Barnwell (August 10, 1801 – November 5, 1882) was an American slave owner, planter, lawyer, and educator from South Carolina who served as a Senator in both the United States Senate and that of the Confederate States of America. Barnwell was a public defender of slavery and secession; he personally owned at least 128 enslaved persons.

== Biography ==
He was born in Beaufort, South Carolina, on August 10, 1801, into a prosperous and influential family. His father Robert Barnwell had served in the Continental Congress and the U.S. Congress. He was also the great-uncle of one of the most influential fire-eaters, Robert Barnwell Rhett. This Robert woodward Barnwell began his advanced education at Beaufort College, then graduated from Harvard. He returned home to manage the family plantation.

Robert Woodward's political career began in 1826 when he served in the South Carolina state House of Representatives for Beaufort County. He held that office until 1828, when he was elected to the U.S. Congress. He served as a congressman from 1829 until 1833. Barnwell supported nullification and feared that Andrew Jackson was "bent on enforcing his mandate at the point of a bayonet." (He declined to run again in 1832.) From 1833 to 1841, he was head of the South Carolina College, now known as the University of South Carolina, in Columbia.

Barnwell was appointed to the United States Senate after the death of Franklin H. Elmore on May 29, 1850. He served only from June until December, when after a special election Robert Barnwell Rhett replaced him. During this period the tenuous balance between the northern and southern Senators required such short-term appointments. His one distinction in the Senate involved the admission of California as a state. He opposed statehood in vain, but then had the good grace to introduce and present the credentials for one of her new senators, John C. Frémont.

In 1861, Barnwell was a delegate to the Confederate States of America Provisional Congress held in Montgomery, Alabama. At the congress' first meeting on February 4, 1861, William P. Chilton moved that Barnwell be appointed to preside temporarily over the Congress until its permanent organization. The Congress approved that proposal, but later that day, Barnwell handed the office over to Howell Cobb. In that Congress, he cast the vote (February 9, 1861) that ensured the election of Jefferson Davis as the first and only Confederate President and signed the Confederate Constitution. He represented South Carolina in the Confederate Senate from 1862 until 1865.

After the Civil War, he returned to Columbia and the university as an instructor. He was the chairman of the faculty at the South Carolina College from 1866 until his removal in 1873, due to being seen as "an obstacle to the integration" of the college. He died in Columbia on November 5, 1882, but was buried in St. Helena's Churchyard back in Beaufort.

== Legacy ==
The University of South Carolina's Barnwell College is named for Barnwell; in July 2021, the university's Presidential Commission on University History recommended removing his name from the college.

== See also ==
- List of Confederate States senators

U.S. House of Representatives
Preceded by James Hamilton	Member of the U.S. House of Representatives from South Carolina's 2nd congressional district 1829–1833	Succeeded by William Grayson
U.S. Senate
Preceded by Franklin Elmore	United States Senator (Class 2) from South Carolina; 1850; Served alongside: Andrew Butler	Succeeded by Robert Rhett
Confederate States Senate
New constituency	Confederate States Senator (Class 2) from South Carolina; 1862–1865; Served alongside: James Orr	Constituency abolished
