= Brownsville, South Carolina =

- Populated place
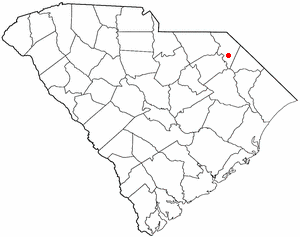
- Location of Brownsville, South Carolina
- Coordinates: 34.392°N 79.592°W
- Country: United States
- State: South Carolina
- County: Marlboro
- Elevation: 135 ft (41 m)
- Time zone: UTC-5 (Eastern (EST))
  - Summer (DST): UTC-4 (EDT)
- ZIP code: 29516
- Area codes: 843, 854
- GNIS feature ID: 1221028

Brownsville is a populated place in Marlboro County, South Carolina, United States.

== Geography ==
Brownsville is located at latitude 34.392 and longitude -79.592. The elevation is 135 feet.
