= Theodore Gourdin =

American politician

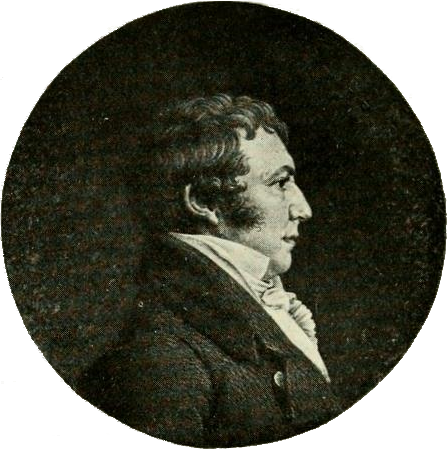
- Gourdin in 1922 publication

Member of the U.S. House of Representatives from South Carolina's 3rd district
- In office March 4, 1813 – March 3, 1815
- Preceded by: David R. Williams
- Succeeded by: Benjamin Huger

Personal details
- Born: March 20, 1764 near Kingstree, Province of South Carolina, British America
- Died: January 17, 1826 (aged 61) Pineville, South Carolina, U.S.
- Resting place: Episcopal Cemetery, Saint Stephen, South Carolina
- Profession: planter

Theodore Gourdin (March 20, 1764 – January 17, 1826) was an American slaveholder and politician who served one term as a U.S. representative from South Carolina from 1813 to 1815.

== Life ==
Born near Kingstree in the Province of South Carolina, Gourdin was educated in Charleston, and in Europe. He owned a plantation, in Moncks Corner, South Carolina.

=== Congress ===
Gourdin was elected as a Democratic-Republican to the Thirteenth Congress (March 4, 1813 – March 3, 1815).

=== Later career and death ===
After his term, he resumed agricultural pursuits.

He died in Pineville, South Carolina, January 17, 1826, and was interred in Episcopal Cemetery, St. Stephen, South Carolina.

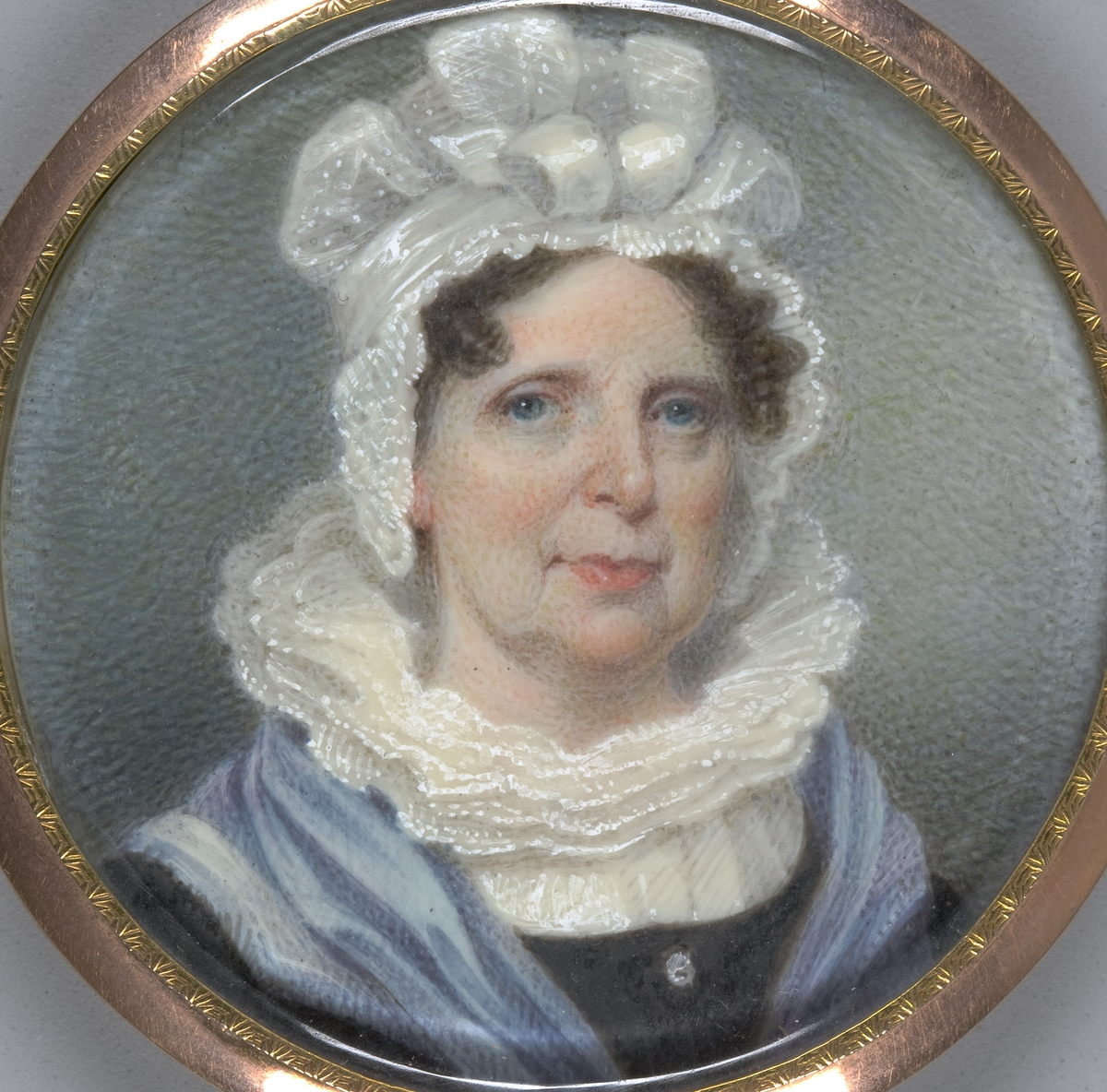
Mrs. Theodore Gourdin (Elizabeth Gaillard) (1766-1835)

== Sources ==
- United States Congress. "Theodore Gourdin (id: G000345)". Biographical Directory of the United States Congress.

U.S. House of Representatives
Preceded by David R. Williams	Member of the U.S. House of Representatives from South Carolina's 3rd congressional district 1813–1815	Succeeded by Benjamin Huger
