= Lemuel Benton =

American planter and politician

Member of the U.S. House of Representatives from South Carolina's 3rd district
- In office March 4, 1793 – March 3, 1799
- Preceded by: Daniel Huger
- Succeeded by: Benjamin Huger

Member of the South Carolina House of Representatives from St. David's Parish
- In office January 8, 1782 – November 4, 1788

Personal details
- Born: 1754 Granville County, Province of North Carolina, British America
- Died: May 18, 1818 (aged 63–64) Darlington, South Carolina, US
- Resting place: Darlington County, South Carolina
- Party: Anti-Administration (until 1795)
- Other political affiliations: Democratic-Republican (1795 onward)
- Profession: lawyer, politician

Military service
- Branch/service: Continental Army; United States Army
- Years of service: 1777–1794
- Rank: Colonel
- Battles/wars: American Revolutionary War

Lemuel Benton (1754 – May 18, 1818) was an 18th-century American slaveholder, planter and politician from Darlington County, South Carolina.

He represented South Carolina in the United States House of Representatives for three terms from 1793 until 1799.

== Biography ==
Benton was born in Granville County, North Carolina, in 1754. In his youth, he moved to what is now known as Darlington County, South Carolina. There, he engaged as a planter and later became a prominent landowner.

=== Revolutionary War ===
He served as a major of the Cheraw Regiment in 1777 and served throughout the Revolutionary War, being promoted to the rank of colonel in 1781. He resigned his commission in 1794.

=== Early political career ===
He served as a member of the State house of representatives from 1782 to 1788, and as a county court justice of Darlington County in 1785 and 1791. In 1787, he was escheator of Cheraw District (composed of what is now Chesterfield, Darlington, and Marlboro Counties). He was sheriff of Cheraw District in 1789 and 1791.

=== Delegate to constitutional conventions ===
He was a delegate to the State convention at Charleston that ratified the Federal Constitution in 1788. He then served as a delegate to the State constitutional convention at Columbia in 1790

=== Congress ===
He was elected as an Anti-Administration candidate to the Third Congress and reelected as a Republican to the Fourth and Fifth Congresses, serving from March 4, 1793, to March 3, 1799.

He was an unsuccessful candidate for reelection to the Sixth Congress in 1798.

=== Later career and death ===
After leaving Congress, he resumed agricultural pursuits and died in Darlington, Darlington County, South Carolina on May 18, 1818. His interment was on his estate, "Stony Hill", near Darlington.

U.S. House of Representatives
Preceded by Daniel Huger	Member of the U.S. House of Representatives from South Carolina's 3rd congressional district 1793–1799	Succeeded by Benjamin Huger
