= List of University of South Carolina people =

This list of University of South Carolina people includes alumni who are graduates or non-matriculating students, and former professors and administrators of the University of South Carolina, with its primary campus located in the American city of Columbia, South Carolina.

== Alumni ==
=== Arts, entertainment, and media ===
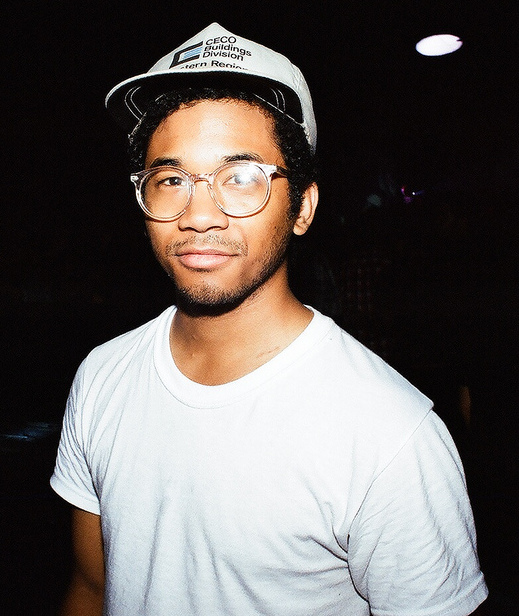
Toro y Moi

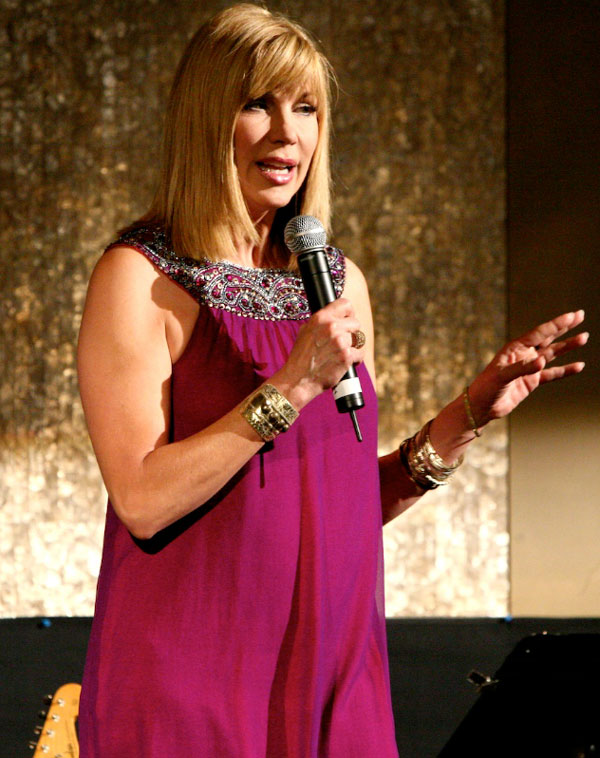
Leeza Gibbons

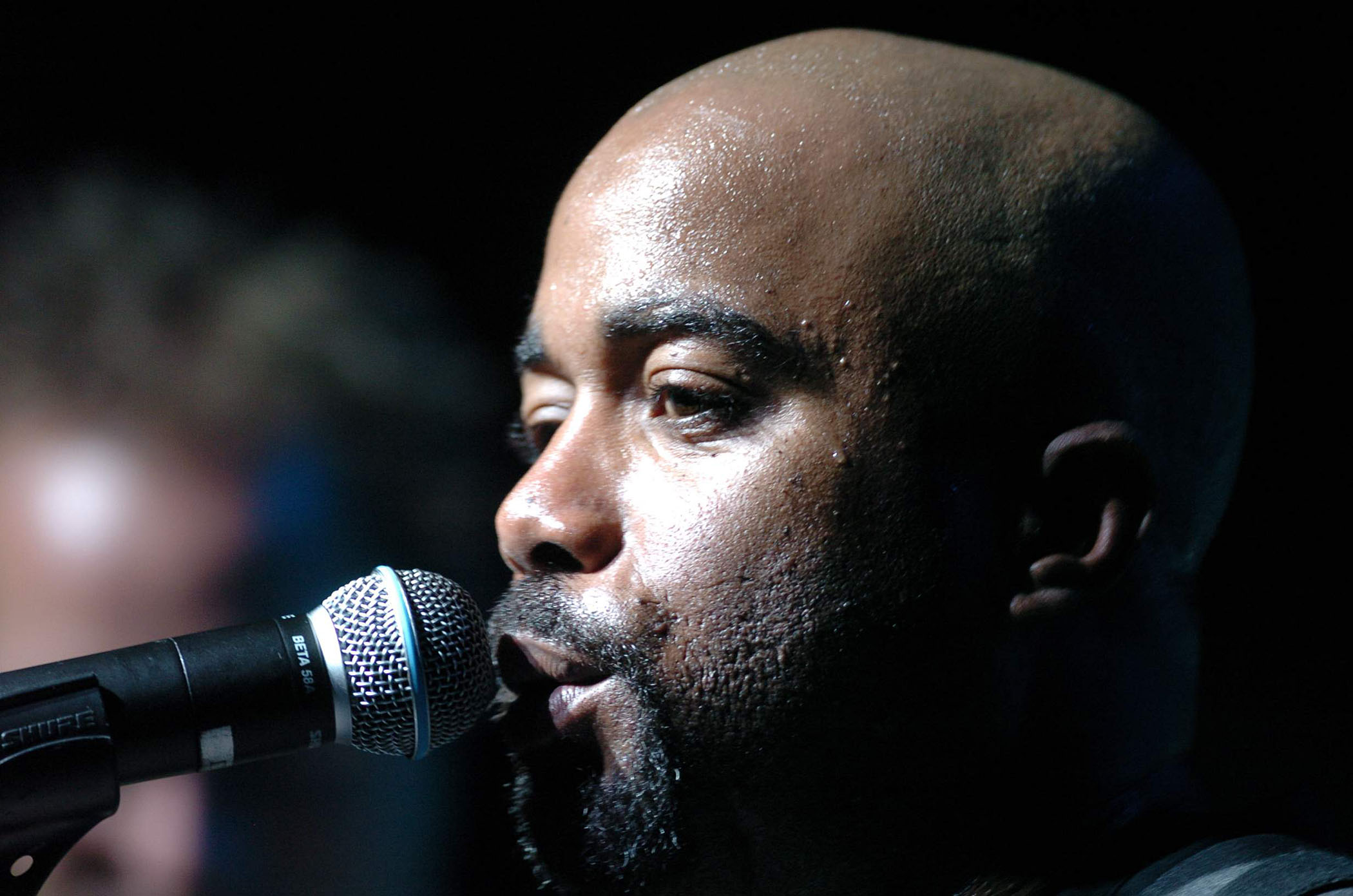
Darius Rucker of Hootie and the Blowfish

Name	Class year	Notes	Reference
Amanda Baker	2001	actress on General Hospital soap opera	
Chazwick Bundick	2009	a.k.a. Toro Y Moi, musician	
Mel Byars	1960	book author, journalist, professor, and Besterman/McColvin Gold Medal winner	
Wilson Casey	1977	syndicated columnist, book author, and Guinness World Record holder	
Mike Colter	1998	actor	
Rita Cosby	1989	host of MSNBC's Rita Cosby Live and three-time Emmy Award winner	
James McBride Dabbs	1916	regional author and civil rights activist	
Alex Daniels	1978	stunt coordinator and actor, Borat, The Guardian, Dodgeball	
Harry Dent	1975	economist and writer	
Ainsley Earhardt	1999	anchor of Fox News Weekend	
Lynette Eason	1989	award-winning Christian novelist	
Charles Frazier	1986	author of the best-selling novel Cold Mountain	
Lilian Garcia	1988	singer and WWE ring announcer	
Leeza Gibbons	1978	actress and former host of Entertainment Tonight TV program, three-time Emmy winner	
Ernest Greene	2009	musician; 2009 graduate with a Master's of Library and Information Science	
Lauren Michelle Hill	2000	actress; February 2001 Playboy Playmate of the Month	
Jim Hoagland	1961	columnist and former chief foreign correspondent of The Washington Post; two-time Pulitzer Prize winner	
Hootie and the Blowfish		all four band members attended the University; drummer Jim Sonefeld played on the UofSC soccer team	
Jesse Hughes		musician in Eagles of Death Metal group	
Jasper Johns		artist; attended 1947–48; did not graduate	
Cheslie Kryst		attorney, journalist, Miss USA 2019 winner; also played the UofSC track team	
Amos Lee	1999	singer, songwriter, and folk guitarist	
Alicia Leeke	before 1995	artist, journalist	
Bruce Littlefield	1989	author, lifestyle expert	
Blue Sky	1964	painter and sculptor responsible for the mural Tunnelvision	
W. Thomas Smith, Jr.	1982	author and columnist	
E. Lee Spence	1976	author, editor, and pioneer underwater archaeologist who discovered the wreck of the Confederate submarine H.L. Hunley in 1970	
Stephen Towns	2004	artist	
Patrick Tyler	1974	chief foreign correspondent for The New York Times	
Matt Watson	1996	Youtube, Supermega, Kids with Problems, Cyndago	
Van Earl Wright	1984	anchor for Fox Sports TV programs	

=== Athletics ===
Name	Class year	Notes	Reference
Dick Sheridan	1964	former head football coach at North Carolina State University and Furman University	
Dale Steele	1976	former head football coach at Campbell University	
Charlie Weis	M.A. 1989	head football coach at the University of Kansas; former head coach of the University of Notre Dame	

==== Baseball ====
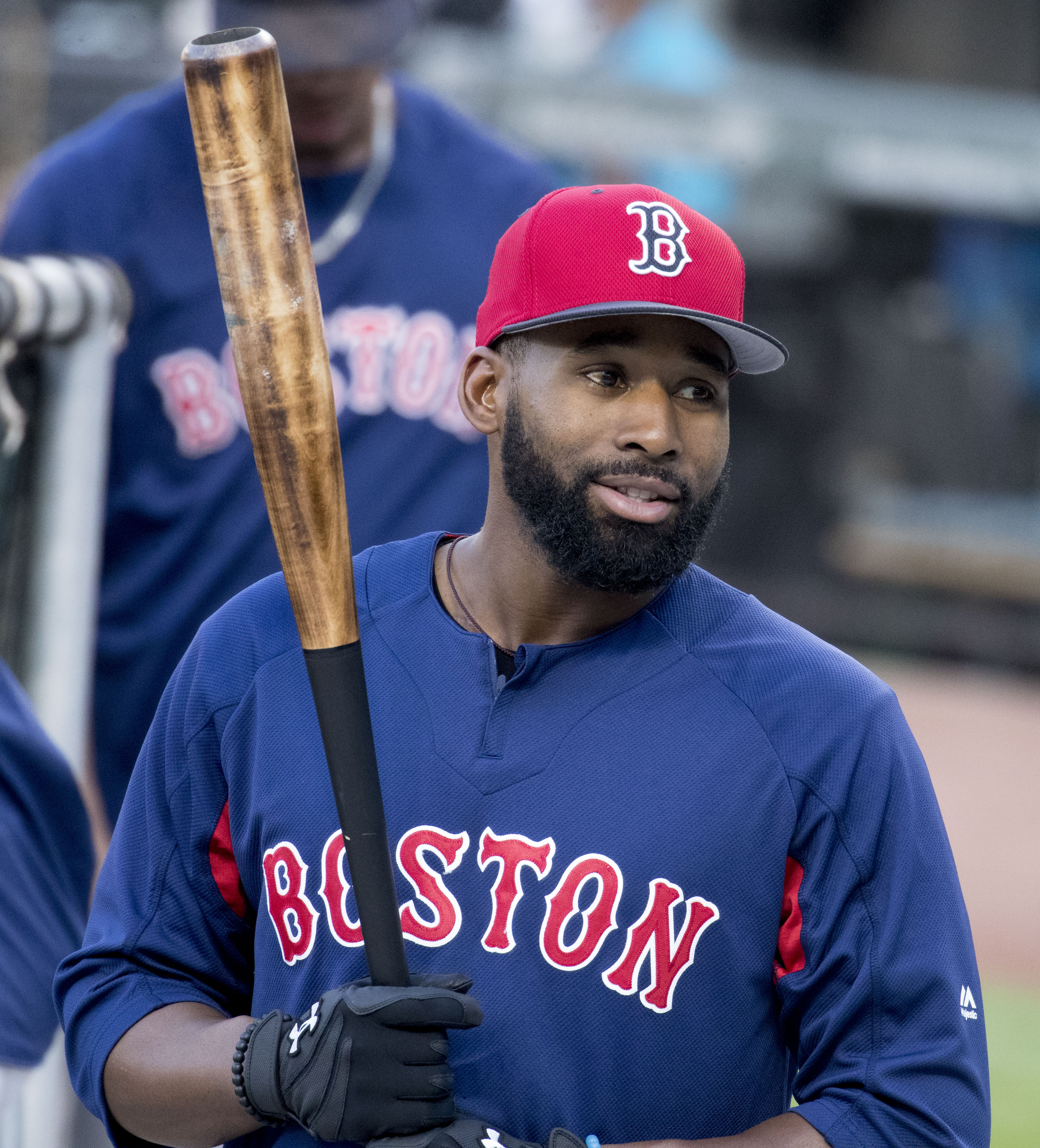
Jackie Bradley Jr.

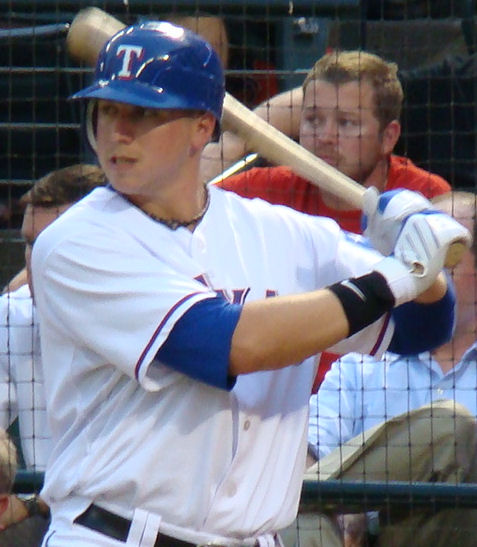
Justin Smoak

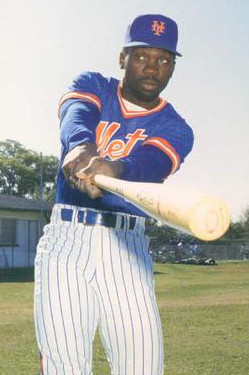
Mookie Wilson

Name	Letter years	Notes	Reference
Kent Anderson	1982–1984	retired MLB infielder	
Jackie Bradley Jr.	2009–2011	outfielder for the Toronto Blue Jays	
Billy Buckner	2004	retired right-handed pitcher for the Arizona Diamondbacks	
Brian Buscher	2002–2003	retired infielder for the Minnesota Twins; assistant coach for Gamecock baseball team (2011–)	
Jon Coutlangus	2002–2003	retired left-handed pitcher for the Arizona Diamondbacks	
Tripp Cromer	1987–1989	retired MLB infielder	
Adam Everett	1997–1998	retired shortstop for the Cleveland Indians; member of gold medal-winning 2000 United States Olympic baseball team	
Lee Gronkiewicz	1999–2001	retired pitcher for the Toronto Blue Jays	
Ed Lynch	1974–1977	retired pitcher for the New York Mets and Chicago Cubs; general manager for the Cubs	
Marcus McBeth	1999–2001	retired MLB pitcher	
Kevin Melillo	2002–2004	retired infielder for the Los Angeles Angels of Anaheim	
Whit Merrifield	2008–2012	second baseman and outfielder for the Toronto Blue Jays	
Drew Meyer	2000–2002	retired shortstop for the Texas Rangers	
Steve Pearce	2004–2005	first baseman for the Boston Red Sox	
Brian Roberts	1999	retired infielder for the Baltimore Orioles	
Justin Smoak	2006–2008	first baseman for the Toronto Blue Jays	
Christian Walker	2010–2012	first baseman for the Arizona Diamondbacks	
Mookie Wilson	1977	retired center fielder for the New York Mets	

==== Men's basketball ====
Name	Letter years	Notes	Reference
Renaldo Balkman	2004–2006	NBA player	
Tom Boswell	1975	former NBA player	
Mike Brittain	1982–1985	former NBA player	
Bobby Cremins	1968–1970	former Georgia Tech and current College of Charleston head basketball coach	
Mike Dunleavy, Sr.	1973–1976	former NBA player, head coach and general manager of the Los Angeles Clippers	
Chuck Eidson	1999–2003	former MVP of the German Basketball Bundesliga and player in Eurocup	
Alex English	1973–1976	NBA Hall of Famer (highest scorer in the 1980s and seventh all-time scorer with 25,343 points)	
Jo Jo English	1989–1992	former NBA player, top scorer in the 1999–2000 Israel Basketball League	
Jim Fox	1964–1965	former NBA player	
Gary Gregor	1965, 1967–1968	former NBA player	
Skip Harlicka	1965–1968	former NBA player	
Kevin Joyce	1971–1973	former ABA player	
Tre' Kelley	2004–2007	player in the Croatian league	
Tarence Kinsey	2003–2006	NBA player, now plays for Hapoel Jerusalem of the Israeli Premier League	
BJ McKie	1996–1999	three-time All-SEC basketball player; the school's all-time leading scorer	
Tom Owens	1969–1971	former NBA player	
Brent Price	1988–1989	former NBA player	
Tom Riker	1970–1972	former NBA player	
John Roche	1969–1971	former NBA player	
Scott Sanderson	1981–1984	head basketball coach at Lipscomb University	
Chris Silva		played in the NBA, now plays in the Israeli Basketball Premier League	
Ryan Stack	1995–1998	former NBA player	
Brandon Wallace	2004–2007	former NBA player	
Jamie Watson	1991–1994	former NBA player	
Brian Winters	1972–1974	former NBA player, coach of WNBA's Indiana Fever	

==== Football ====
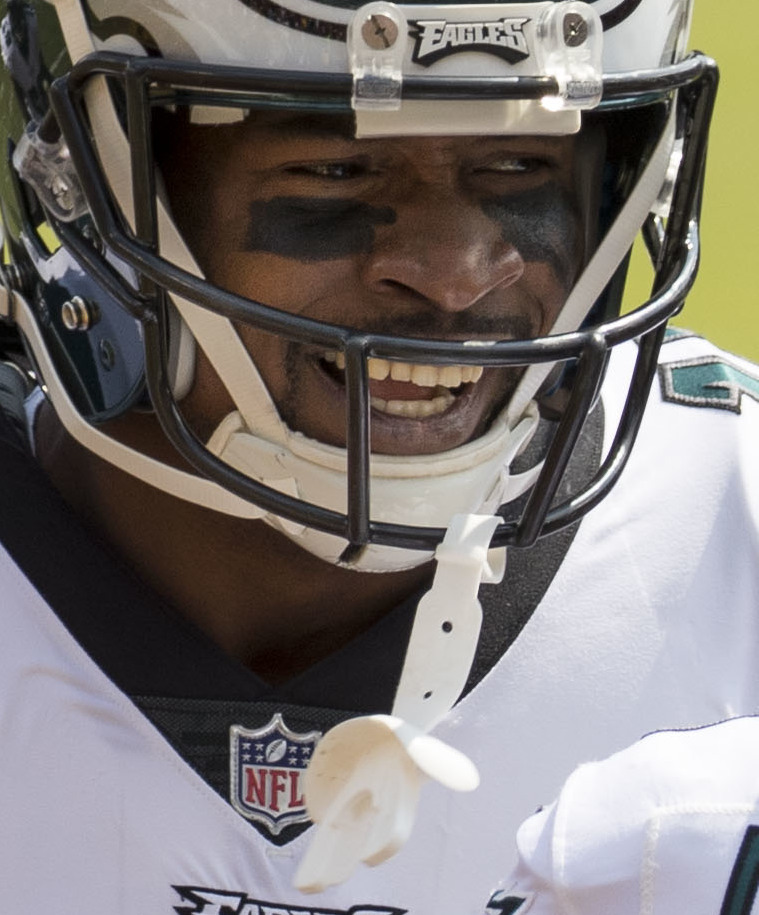
Alshon Jeffery

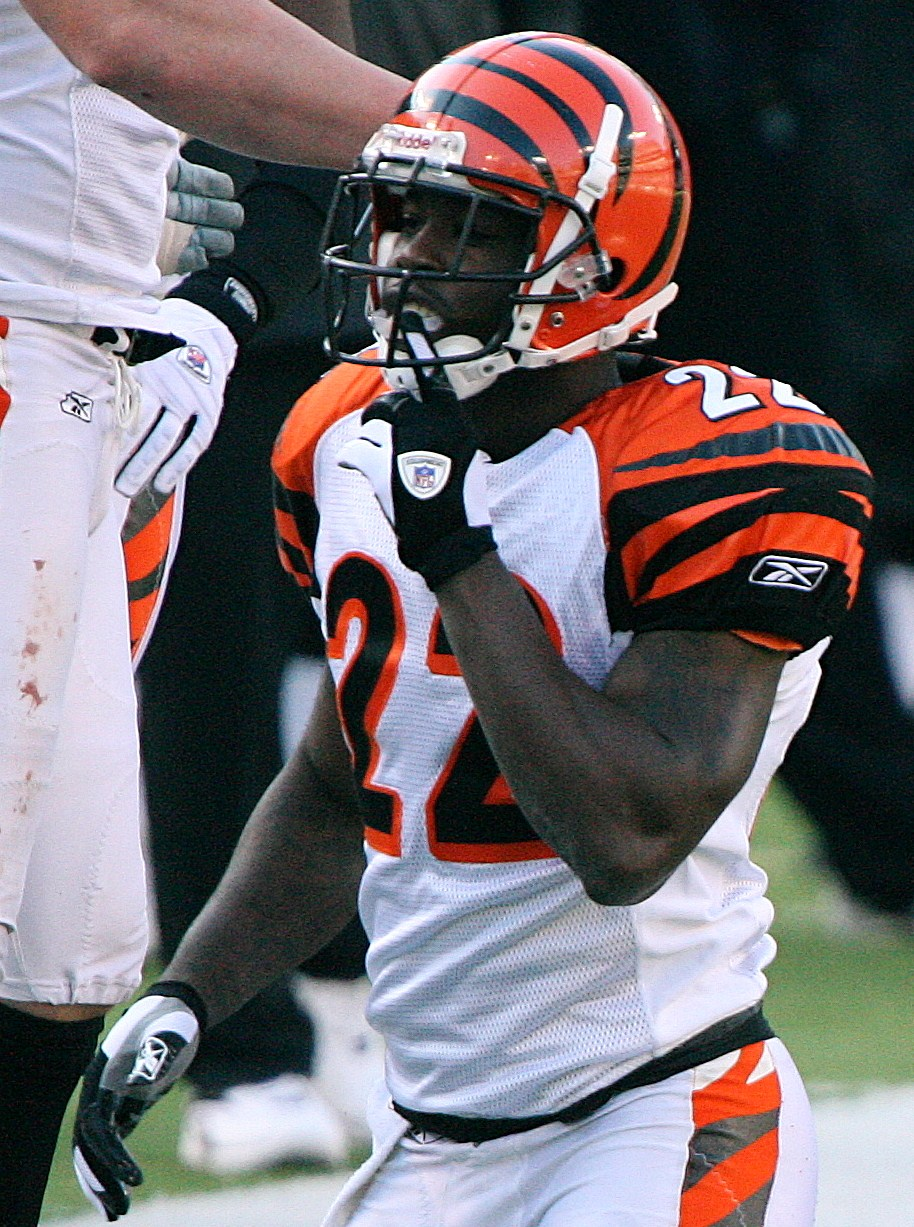
Johnathan Joseph

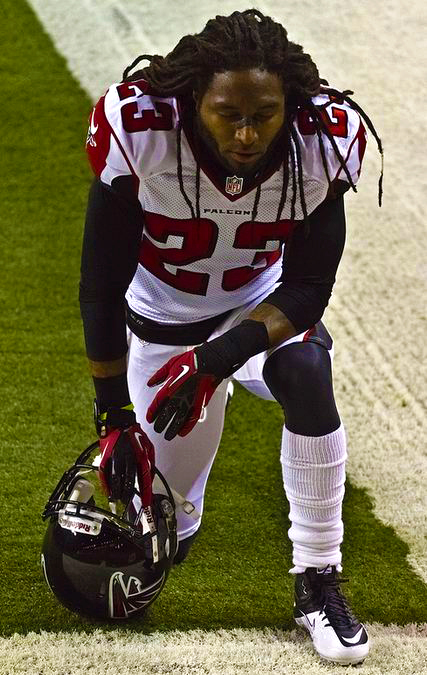
Dunta Robinson

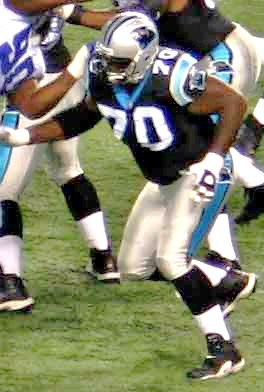
Travelle Wharton

Name	Letter years	Notes	Reference
John Abraham	1996–1999	NFL player	
Tom Addison	1955–1957	American Football League All-Star (Boston Patriots) and founder of American Football League Players Association	
Ronald Edwin Bass	1973–1977	former USC football player and member of the 1971 T. C. Williams High School from Remember the Titans	
Sheldon Brown	1998–2001	former NFL player	
Jadeveon Clowney	2011–2013	NFL player	
Chris Culliver	2007–2010	NFL player	
Justice Cunningham	2009–2012	2013 Mr. Irrelevant	
Mark Dantonio	1976–1978	current Michigan State University head football coach	
Zola Davis	1995–1998	NFL and XFL player	
Patrick DiMarco	2007–2010	former NFL player	
Brad Edwards	1984–1987	former NFL player and athletic director of George Mason University	
Kalimba Edwards	1998–2001	former NFL player	
Stephon Gilmore	2009–2011	NFL player, AFC Defensive Player of the Year 2019	
Harold Green	1986–1989	former NFL player	
Tori Gurley	2009–2010	NFL player	
Darren Hambrick	1996–1997	former NFL player	
Alex Hawkins	1956–1958	former NFL player and ACC Player of the Year in 1958	
DeVonte Holloman	2009–2012	NFL player	
Melvin Ingram	2009–2011	NFL player	
Alshon Jeffery	2009–2011	NFL player	
Corey Jenkins	2001–2002	former NFL player	
Johnathan Joseph	2004–2005	NFL player	
Cliff Matthews	2009–2010	NFL player	
Kenny McKinley	2005–2008	former NFL player	
Langston Moore	1999–2002	former NFL player	
Eric Norwood	2006–2009	NFL player	
Willie Offord	1998–2001	former NFL player	
Andrew Provence	1979–1982	former NFL player	
Dan Reeves	1962–1964	former NFL player and head coach	
Sidney Rice	2005–2006	NFL player	
Dunta Robinson	2001–2003	NFL player	
Marcus Robinson	1993–1994, 1996	former NFL player	
George Rogers	1977–1980	former No. 1 draft pick in the NFL, 1980 Heisman Trophy winner	
Weslye Saunders	2009–2010	NFL player	
Sterling Sharpe	1983, 1985–1987	former NFL player and ESPN football analyst	
Ko Simpson	2004–2005	NFL player	
Duce Staley	1995–1996	former NFL player and Gamecock Radio Network sideline reporter	
Ryan Succop	2005–2008	kicker, 2009 Mr. Irrelevant	
Rod Trafford	1999–2001	NFL player	
Travelle Wharton	2000–2003	NFL player	
Troy Williamson	2002–2004	NFL player	

==== Men's soccer ====
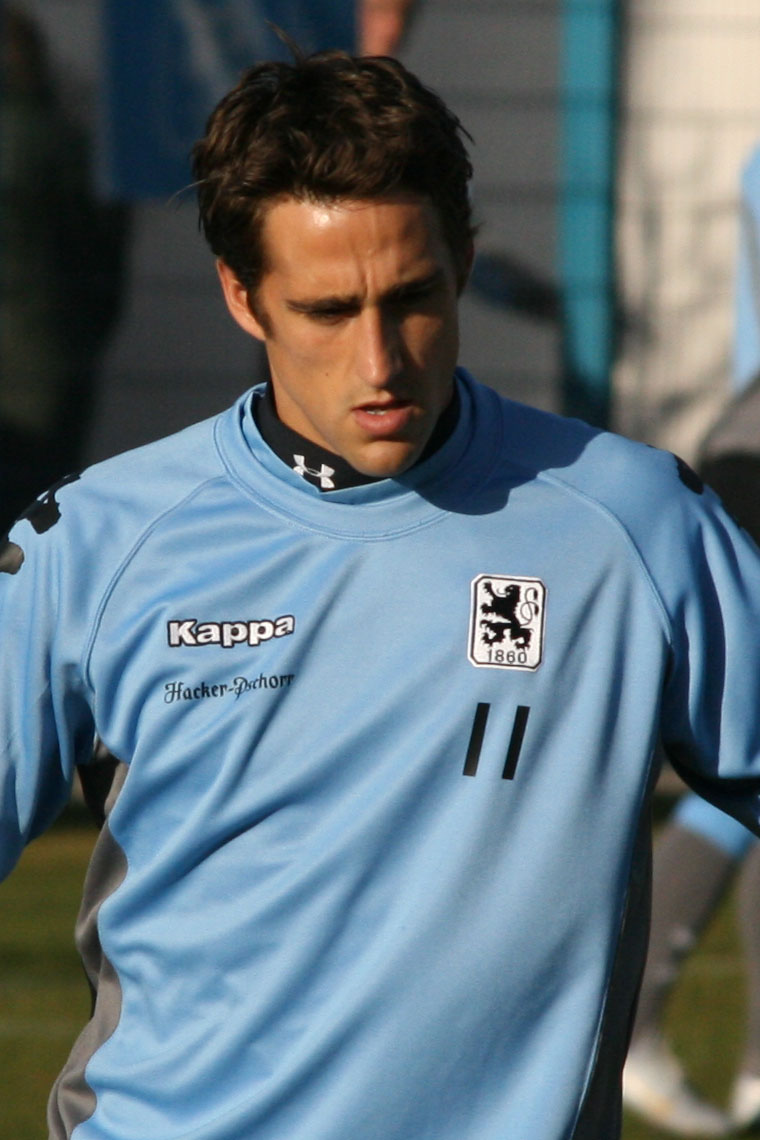
Josh Wolff

Name	Letter years	Notes	Reference
Brad Guzan	2003–2004	goalkeeper for Middlesbrough in the Premier League	
Tim Hankinson	1973–1977	head coach of the San Antonio Scorpions in the North American Soccer League	
Clint Mathis	1994–1997	retired forward for Real Salt Lake in Major League Soccer	
Josh Wolff	1995–1997	forward for D.C. United in Major League Soccer	

==== Other sports ====
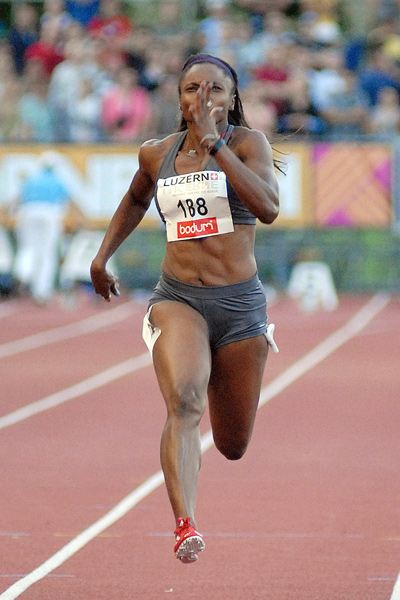
Aleen Bailey

Name	Letter years	Notes	Reference
Aleen Bailey	2002–2003	Olympic gold medalist	
Dawn Ellerbe	1993–1997	track and field champion, United States Olympian	
Otis Harris	2001–2004	Olympic gold and silver medalist	
Shannon Johnson	1992–1996	second all-time leading scorer in women's basketball history (2,230 points), member of gold medal-winning 2004 U.S. Olympic basketball team, and four-time WNBA all-star	
Terrence Trammell	1998–2000	Olympic silver medalist in 2000 and 2004; world champion in 60-meter hurdles	
Tonique Williams-Darling	1997–1998	Olympic gold medalist in 2004 in the 400 meters for the Bahamian team	

=== Business, education, and sciences ===
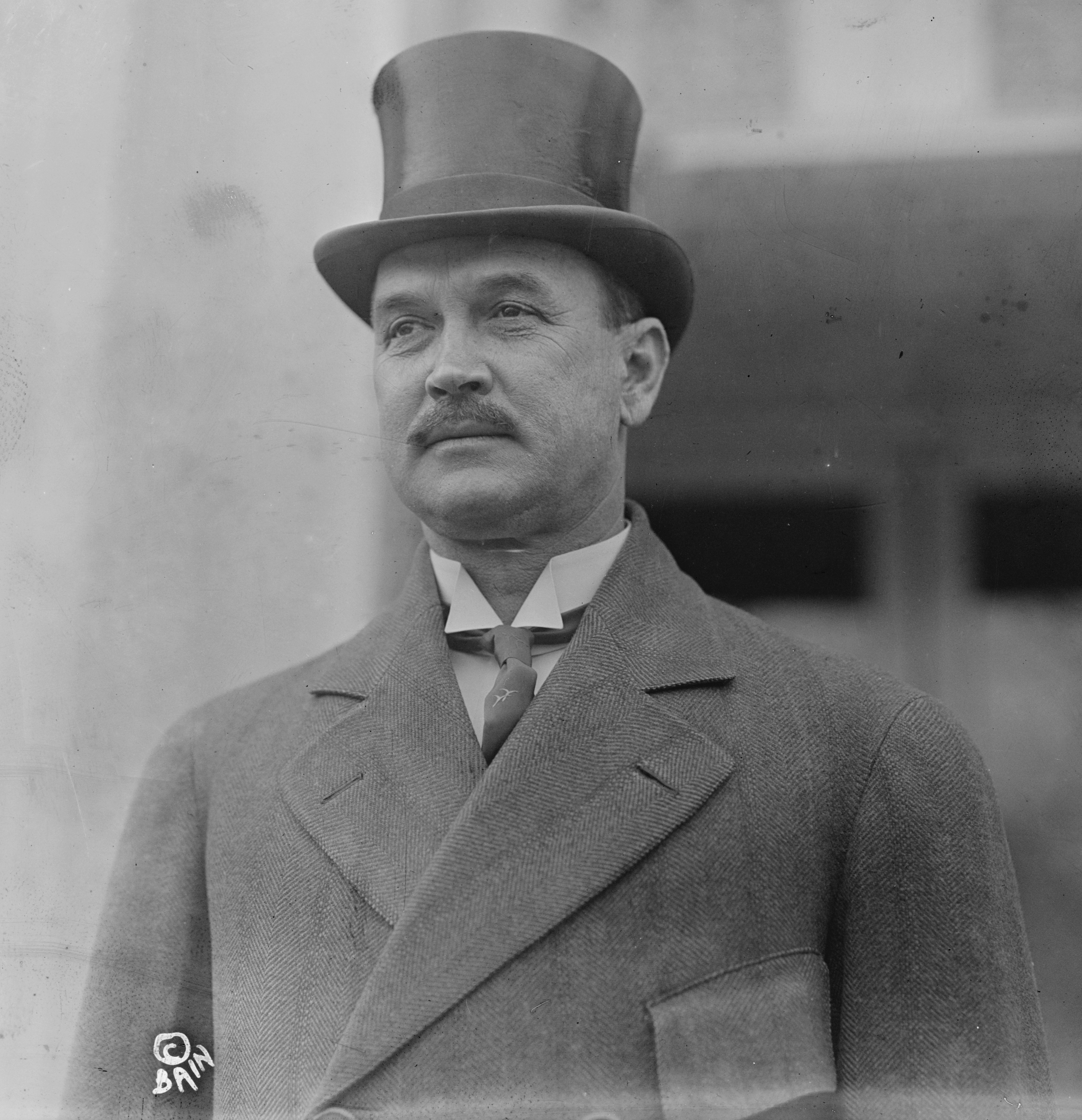
David F. Houston

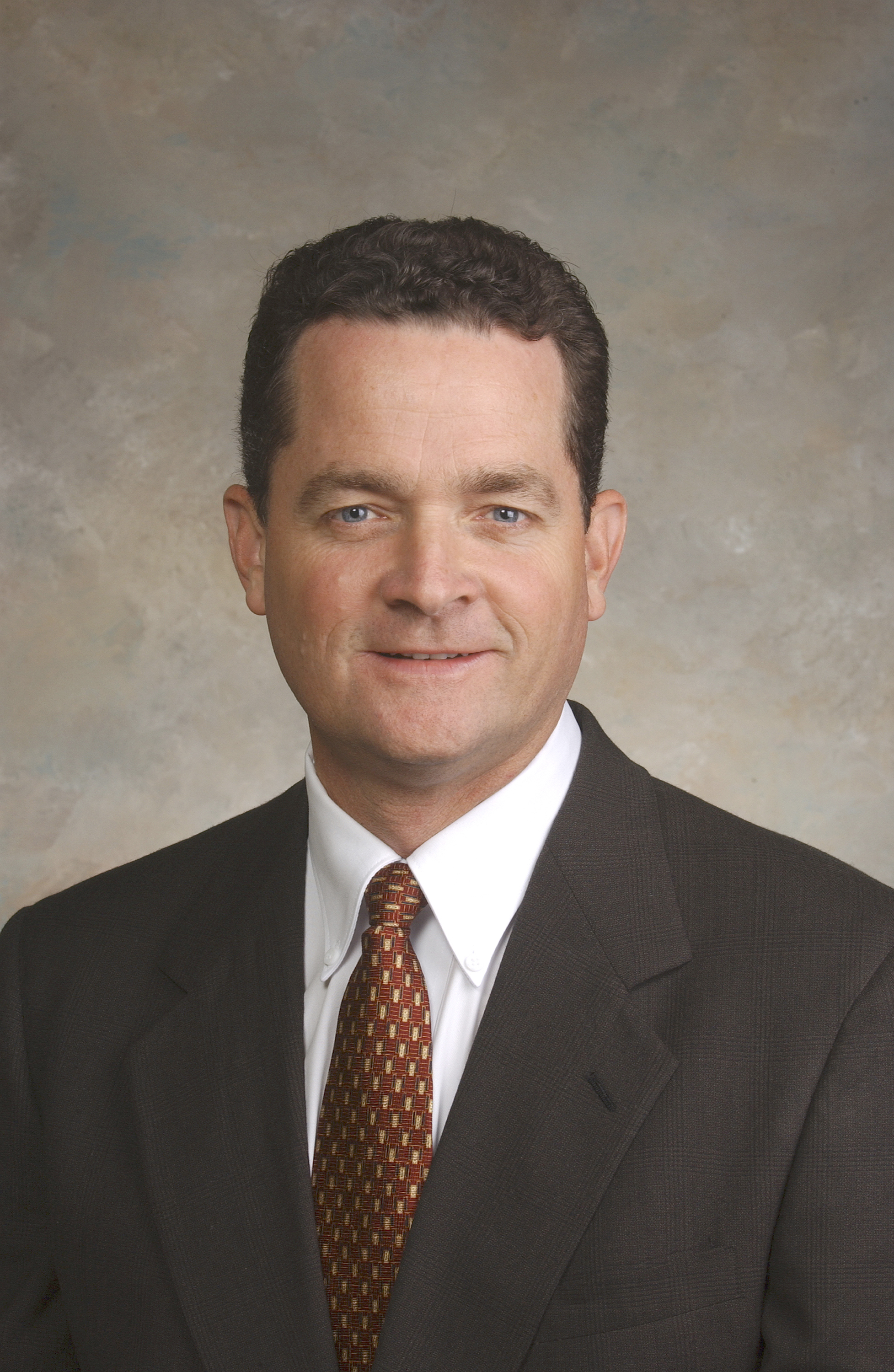
David A. King

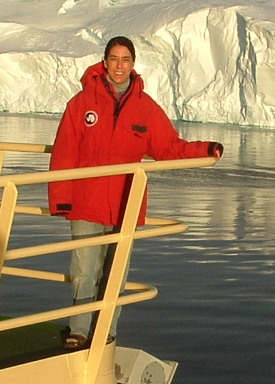
Amy Leventer

Drew Van Horn

Name	Class year	Notes	Reference
Rick Brewer	Ph.D. in educational administration	president of Louisiana College in Pineville, Louisiana, since 2015; administrator at Charleston Southern University in North Charleston, 1987–2015	
Joseph Burckhalter	1934	retired distinguished professor emeritus at the University of Michigan and member of the National Inventors Hall of Fame	
Bryan Coker	YM.Ed. in higher education	12th president of Maryville College in Maryville, Tennessee	
Charles Dallara	1970	international economist and managing director for the Institute of International Finance	
Mohammed Dajani Daoudi	Ph.D. in government, 1981	Palestinian professor and peace activist	
David F. Houston	1887	president of Texas A&M and the University of Texas; chancellor of Washington University in St. Louis	
William "Hootie" Johnson	1953	chairman of the executive committee of Bank of America; former chairman of the Augusta National Golf Club	
Carol Keehan	1980	president and CEO of the Catholic Health Association of the United States	
Larry Kellner	1981	chairman of the board and CEO of Continental Airlines	
David A. King	1983	director of NASA's Marshall Space Flight Center	
Amy Leventer	1982	marine biologist, micropaleontologist, Antarctic researcher	
Robert C. McNair	1958	owner of NFL franchise Houston Texans	
Darla Moore	1975	financier, philanthropist, namesake of the Moore School of Business	
Simona Hunyadi Murph	Ph.D. in Chemistry; Nanotechnology 2007	scientist, engineer, and inventor at Savannah River National Laboratory; adjunct professor at University of Georgia	
Lois Privor-Dumm	1988	director of Alliances and Information for PneumoADIP, Johns Hopkins Bloomberg School of Public Health	
Jacob Shuford	1974	admiral and current president of the United States Naval War College, Newport, Rhode Island, 2004–present	
E. Lee Spence	1976	underwater archaeologist; discovered the wreck of the Confederate submarine H.L. Hunley, 1970	
Glenn Tilton	1970	chairman, president, and CEO of United Airlines	
Drew Van Horn	Ph.D. in educational administration	president of Young Harris College in Young Harris, Georgia since 2017; former president at Brevard College in Brevard, North Carolina, 2002–2011	
Samuel Phillips Verner	1892	missionary and African explorer who brought Ota Benga, the human exhibit from the Congo, to the US	
John Kenneth Waddell	1988	president of Denmark Technical College	
Howard A. "Humpy" Wheeler, Jr.	1961	president of Charlotte Motor Speedway	

=== Government, law, and politics ===
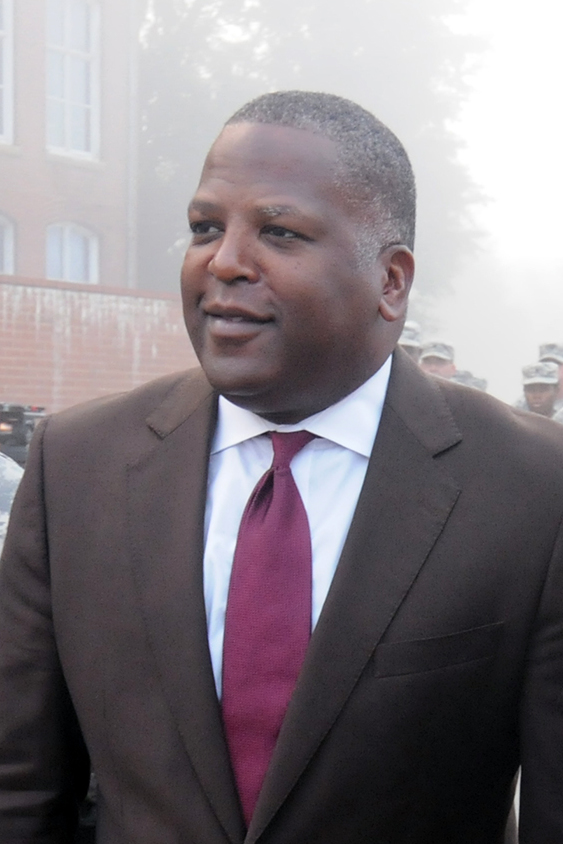
Stephen K. Benjamin

Name	Class	Notes	Reference
Weston Adams	1960	U.S. ambassador to the Republic of Malawi; member of the South Carolina House of Representatives	
Lee Atwater	1977	political consultant/strategist	
André Bauer		lieutenant governor of South Carolina	
Stephen K. Benjamin		mayor of Columbia, South Carolina	
Solomon Blatt, Sr.	1917	former longtime speaker of the South Carolina House of Representatives	
Solomon Blatt, Jr.	1941	former district court judge	
C. Marshall Cain		member of the South Carolina House of Representatives	
Lawrence Cain	1876 Law	member of the South Carolina House of Representatives and the South Carolina Senate	
Andrew Card	1971	former White House chief of staff for President George W. Bush	
Wilbur Cave		former member of the South Carolina House of Representatives	
Joseph W. Coker		member of the South Carolina House of Representatives	
John E. Courson		Republican member, South Carolina Senate	
W. Paul Culbertson		member of the South Carolina House of Representatives	
Allison Dahle		Democratic member, North Carolina House of Representatives	
Katon Dawson	1979	South Carolina Republican Party chairman	
Julie Emerson		Republican member, Louisiana House of Representatives, beginning 2016	
Tom Ervin	1977	Republican member, South Carolina House of Representatives	
James E. Gonzales		member of the South Carolina House of Representatives	
Alvin Greene		Democratic nominee, United States Senate, 2010	
Terry Haskins	1981 Law	member of the South Carolina House of Representatives from 1986 until his death in 2000	
Richard M. Kenan		member of the South Carolina House of Representatives	
Robert E. Kneece		member of the South Carolina House of Representatives and chairman of the South Carolina Department of Social Services	
Toney J. Lister		member of the South Carolina House of Representatives	
Glenn F. McConnell	1972	South Carolina Senate president pro tempore	
Edgar L. McGowan	1961	commissioner of labor of South Carolina	
Hugh R. Miller	1833	member of the Mississippi House of Representatives 1842–1844; mortally wounded at the Battle of Gettysburg	
Melvin Purvis	1925	FBI agent who helped capture 1930s gangsters John Dillinger, Pretty Boy Floyd, and Baby Face Nelson	
Charles V. Pyle Jr.		member of the South Carolina House of Representatives	
Bakari Sellers	2008 Law	member of the South Carolina House of Representatives (2006–2014)	
Paris Simkins	1876	lawyer, minister, and member of the South Carolina House of Representatives (1872–1876)	
Harry A. Slattery	1944	undersecretary of the United States Department of the Interior, 1938–39, the so-called Slattery Report	
Jean H. Toal	1968	chief justice of the South Carolina Supreme Court	
William Henry Wallace	1849	speaker of the South Carolina House of Representatives, Confederate States Army brigadier general, circuit judge (1877–1893)	
Charles S. West	1848	Texas jurist and politician	
Knox H. White	Law	mayor of Greenville, 1995–	

==== United States senators from South Carolina ====
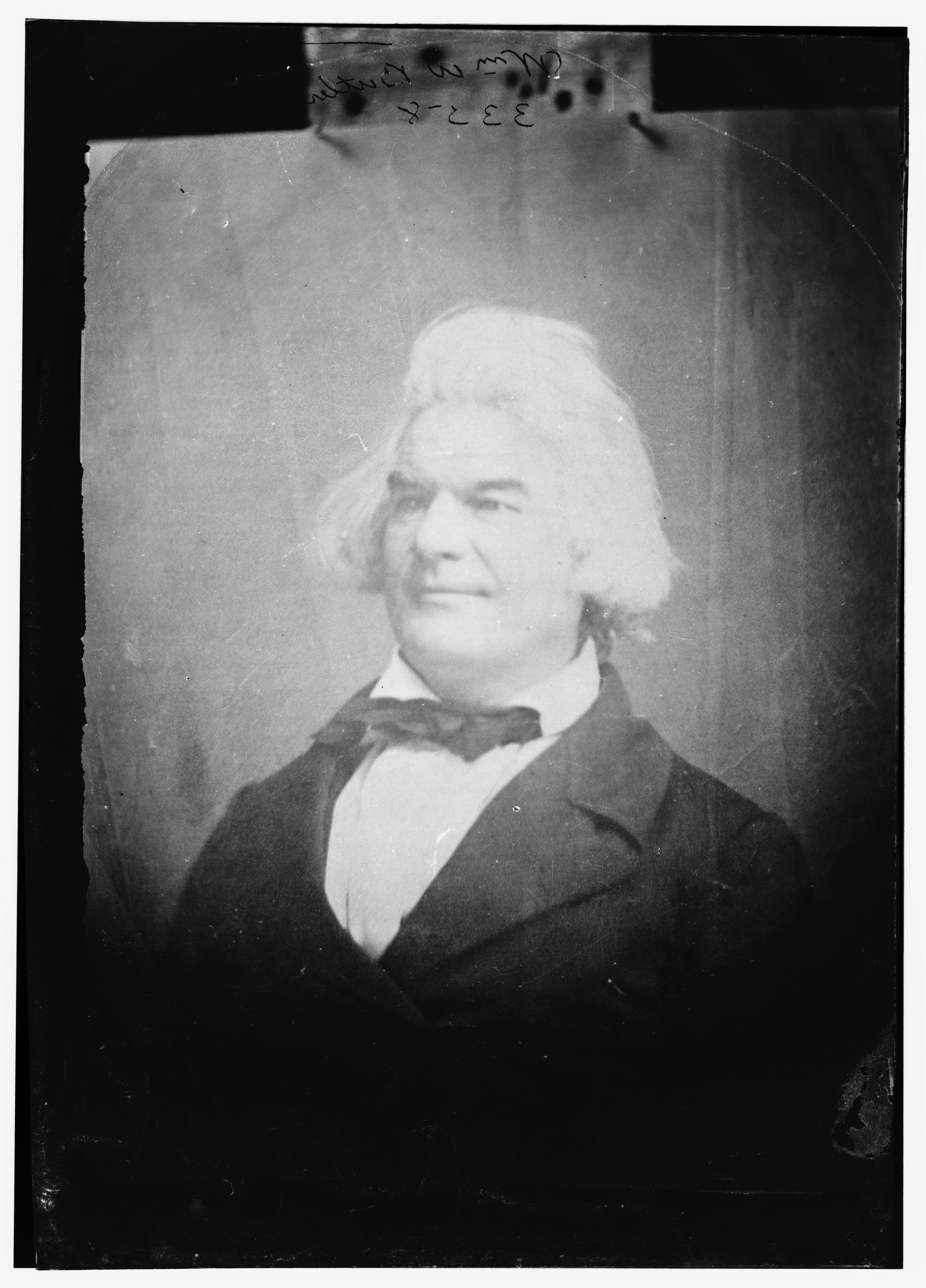
Andrew Butler

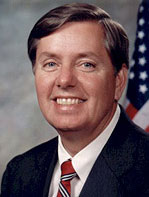
Lindsey Graham

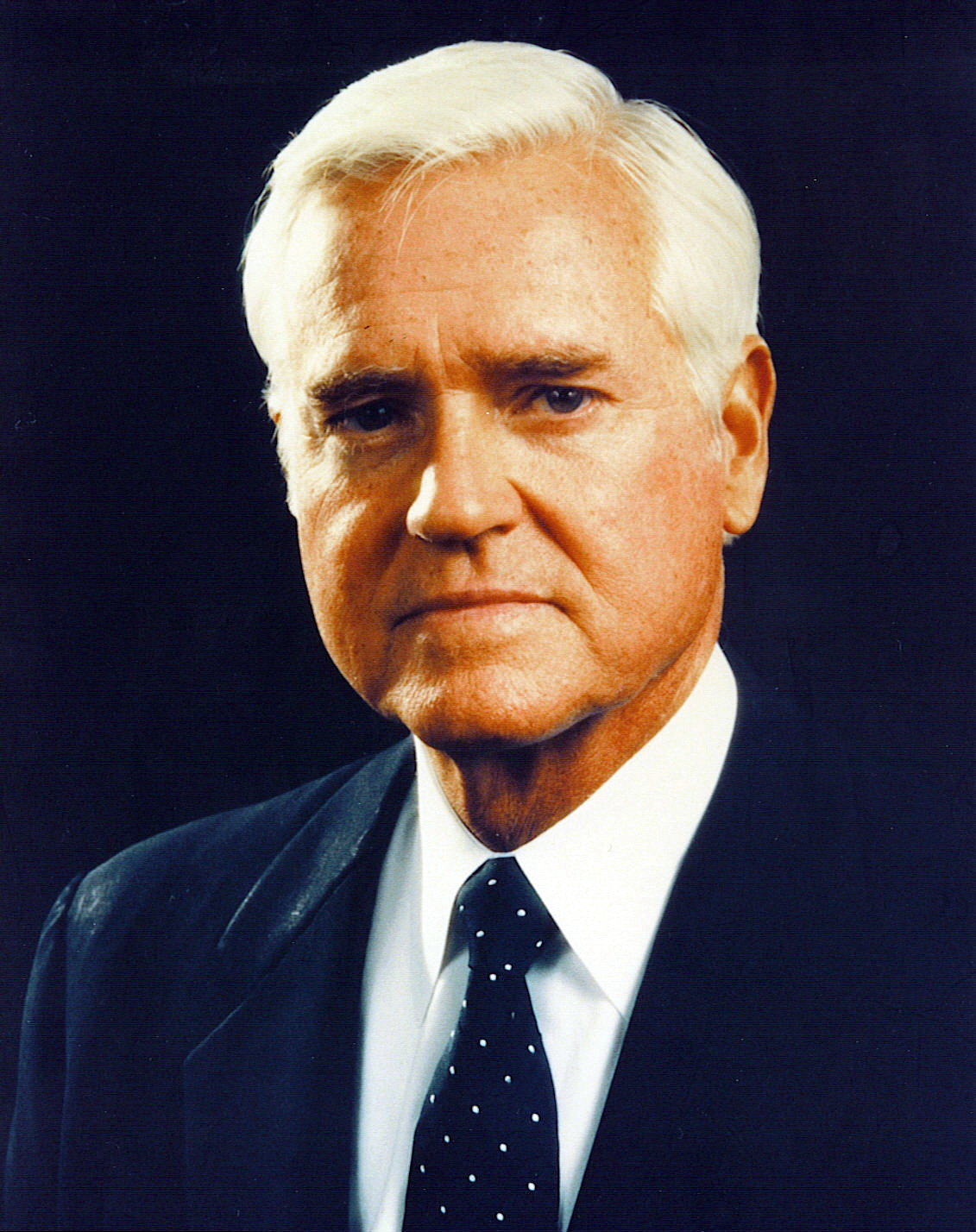
Ernest Hollings

Name	Class year	Term in office	Notes	Reference
Christie Benet	1902	1918	also coach of the Gamecock football team	
Coleman Livingston Blease		1925–1931	expelled for plagiarism in 1888, did not graduate; also governor of South Carolina	
Andrew Butler	1817	1846–1857	also an author of the Kansas-Nebraska Act	
Matthew Butler	1856	1877–1895	attended in the late 1850s	
Franklin H. Elmore	1819	1850	also United States representative	
Josiah J. Evans	1808	1853–1858		
Lindsey Graham	1977	2003–2026	also United States representative	
James Henry Hammond	1825	1857–1860	also governor of South Carolina and United States representative	
Wade Hampton III	1836	1879–1891	also governor of South Carolina	
William Harper	1808	1826	also jurist and social and political theorist	
Ernest Hollings	1947	1966–2005	also governor of South Carolina	
John W. Johnston	1836	1870–1883	also served in Virginia State Senate	
Olin D. Johnston	1924	1945–1965	also governor of South Carolina	
Alva M. Lumpkin	1908	1941		
George McDuffie	1813	1842–1846	also governor of South Carolina and United States representative	
Stephen Decatur Miller	1808	1831–1833	also governor of South Carolina and United States representative	
William P. Pollock	1891	1918–1919		
William C. Preston	1812	1833–1842		
Thomas J. Robertson	1843	1868–1877		
Donald S. Russell	1925	1965–1966	also governor of South Carolina, United States assistant secretary of state for administration, and president of the University of South Carolina	
Ellison D. Smith		1909–1944	failed freshman year; did not graduate	
Thomas A. Wofford	1928	1956	also graduate of the Harvard University Law School, 1931	

==== United States representatives from South Carolina ====
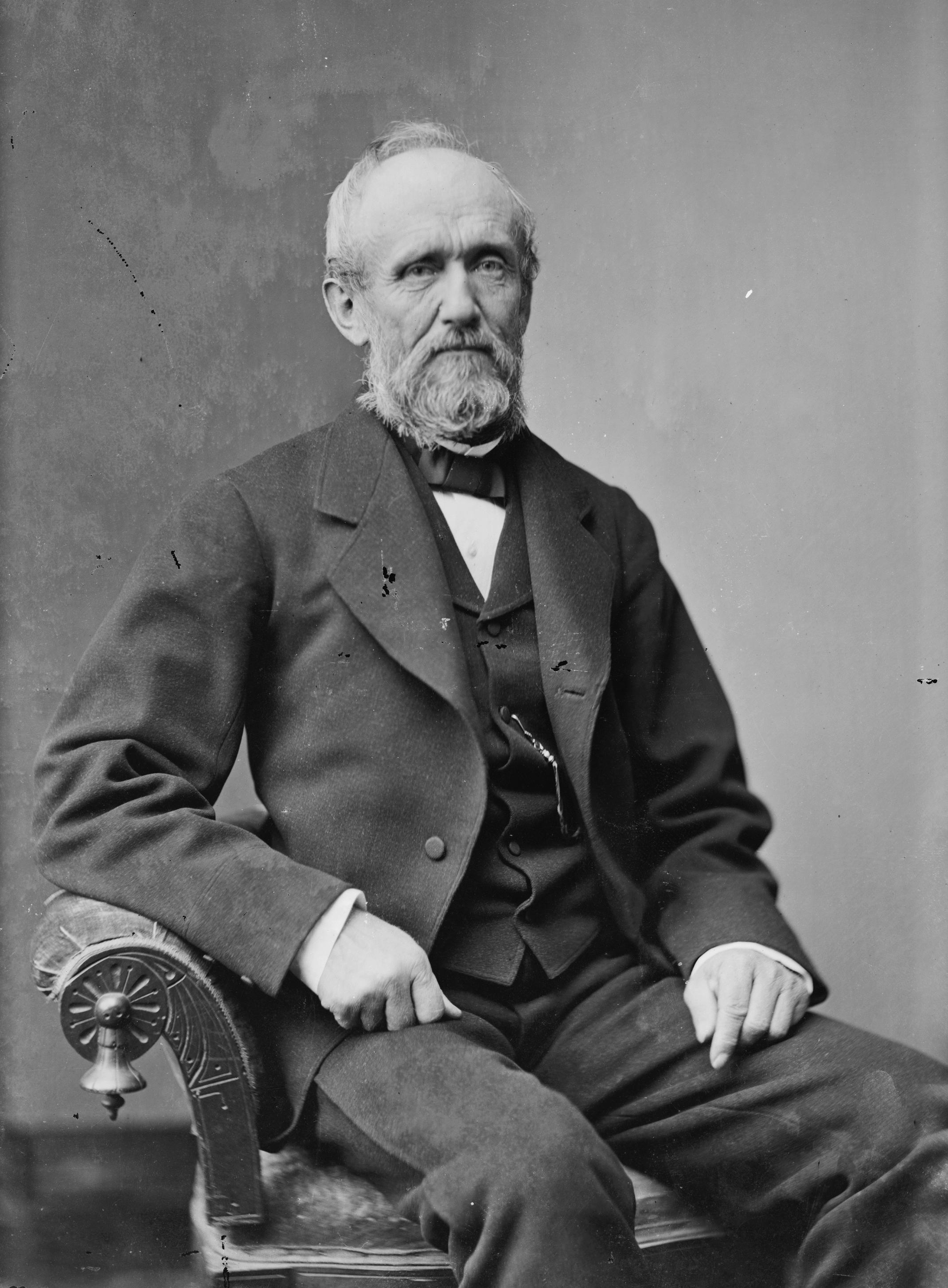
D. Wyatt Aiken

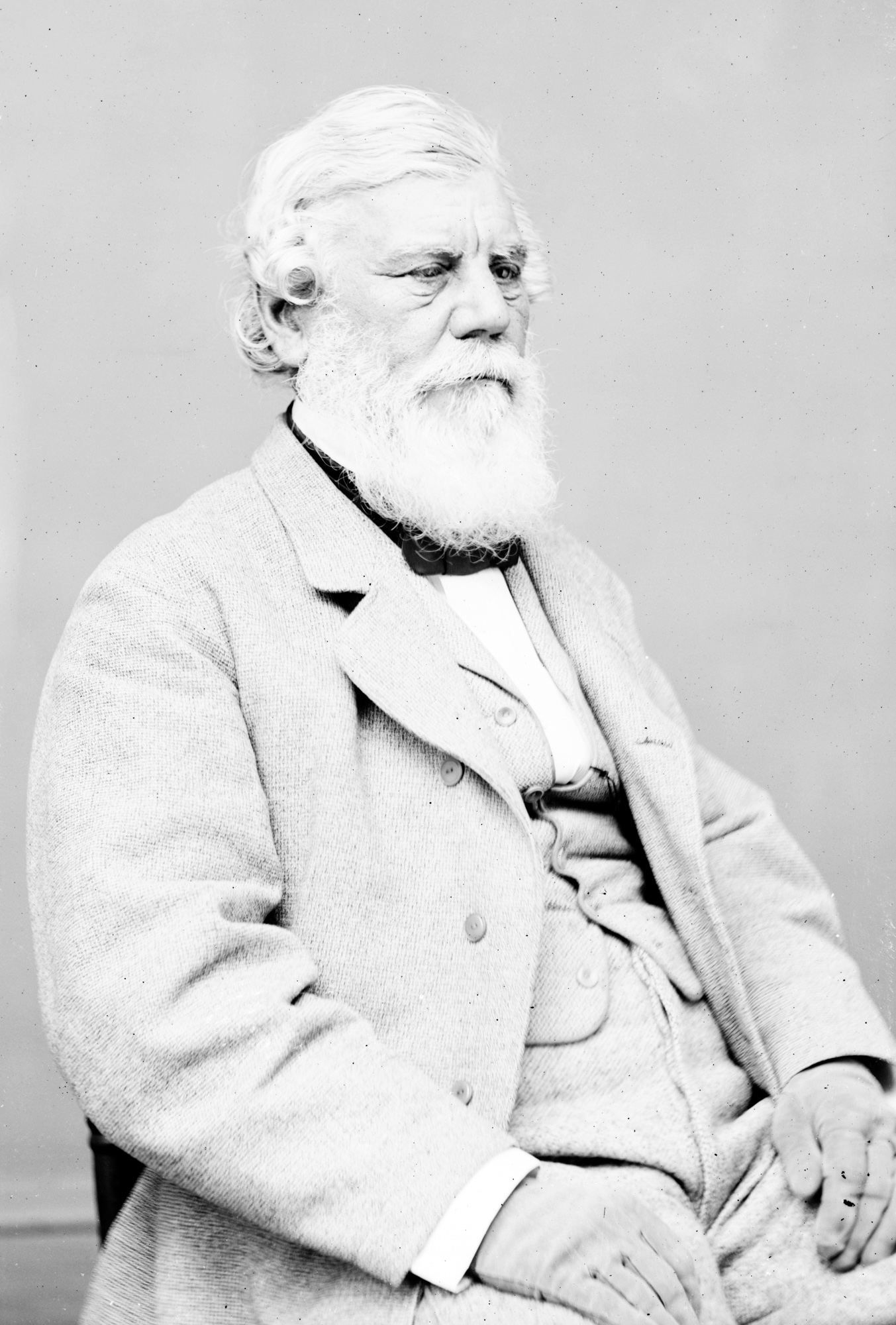
William Aiken

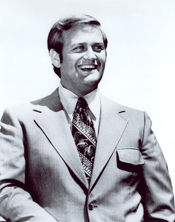
Mendel Jackson Davis

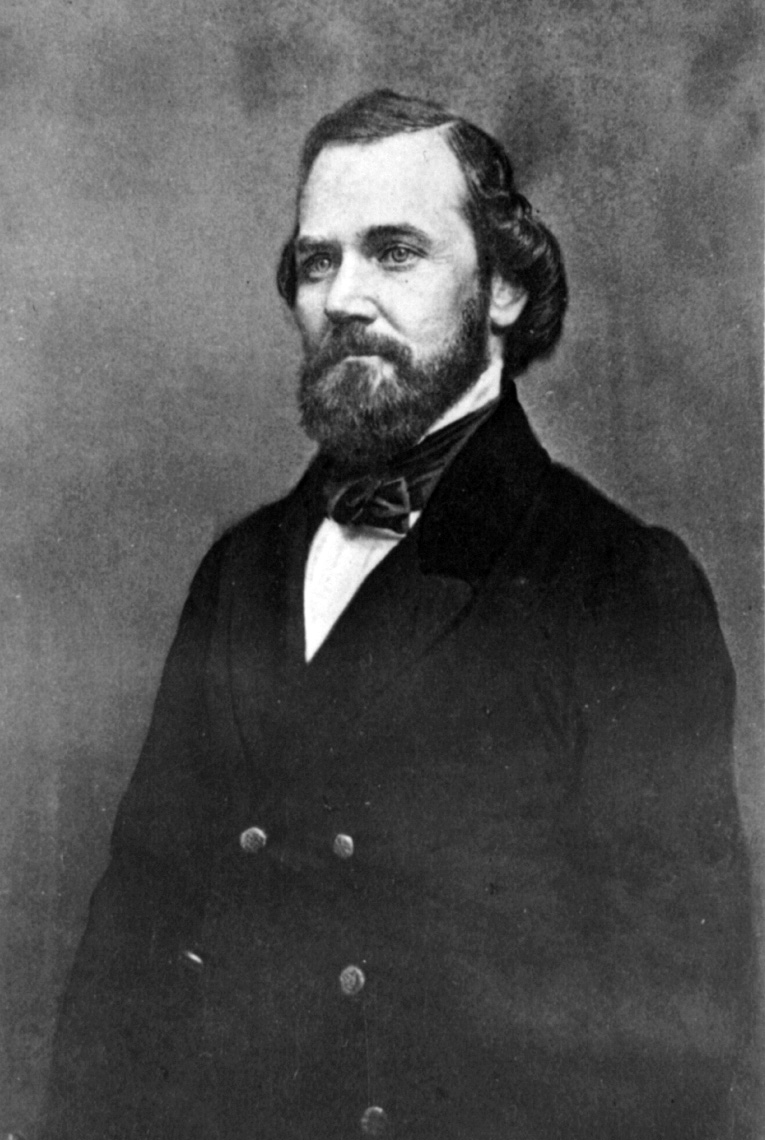
Laurence M. Keitt

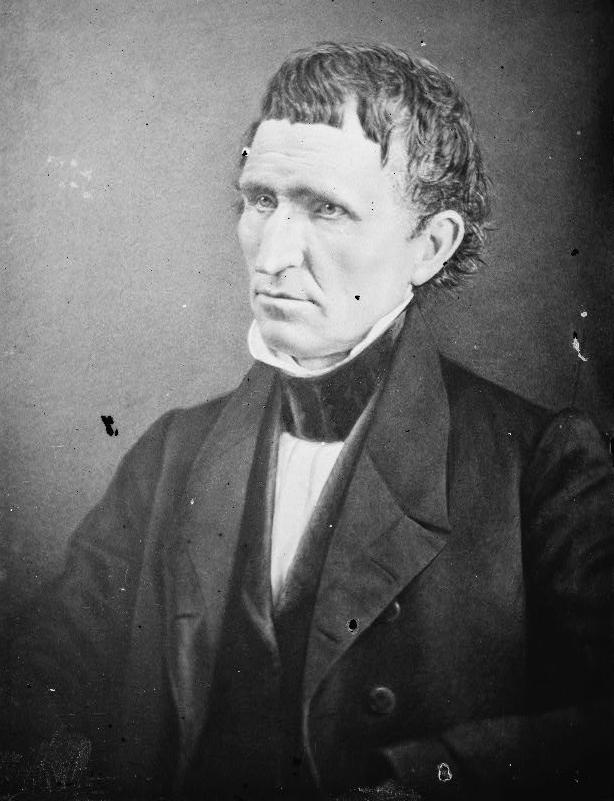
George McDuffie

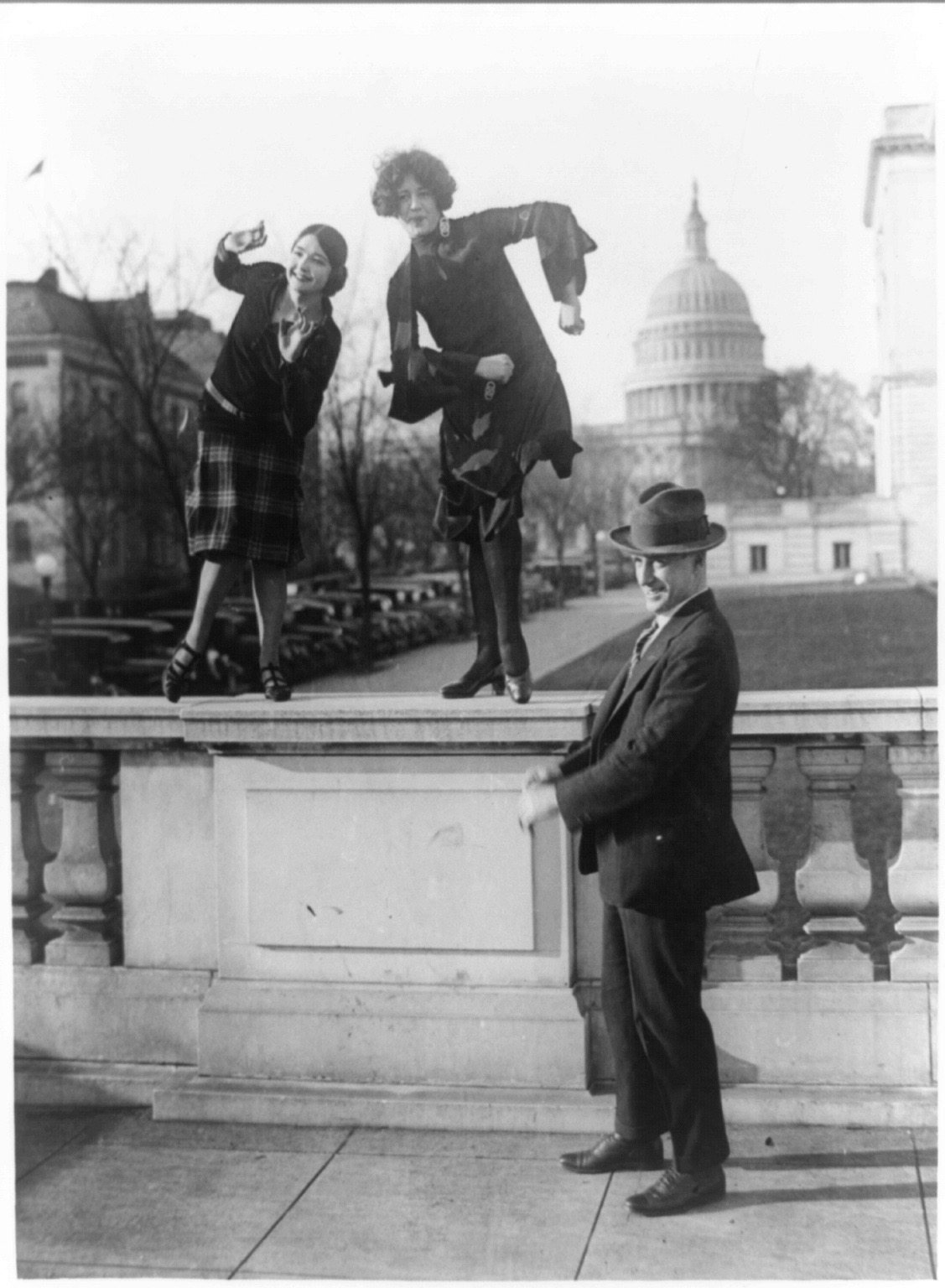
Thomas S. McMillan

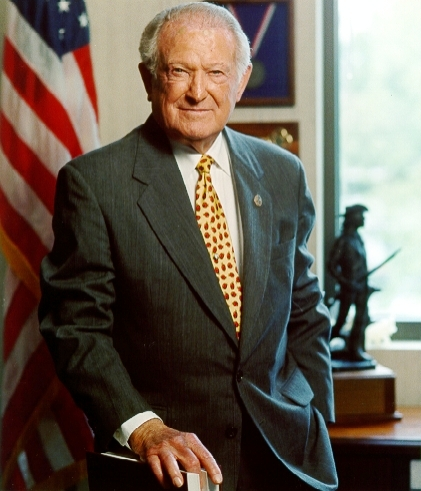
Floyd Spence

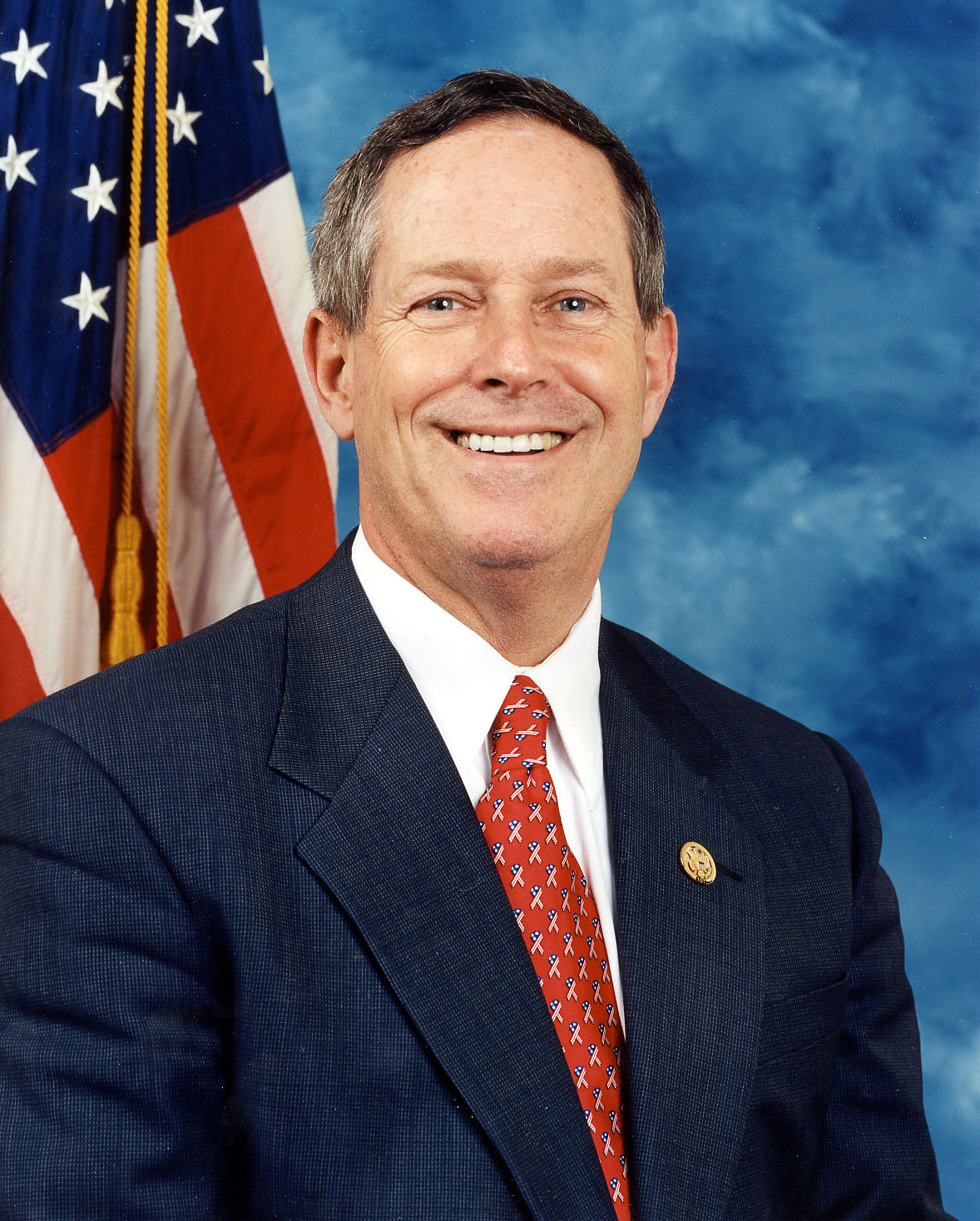
Joe Wilson

Name	Class year	Term in office	Notes	Reference
D. Wyatt Aiken	1849	1877–1887		
William Aiken Jr.	1825	1851–1857	also governor of South Carolina	
Milledge Luke Bonham	1834	1857–1860	also governor of South Carolina	
William Waters Boyce		1853–1860	attended in the late 1830s; did not graduate	
John Bratton	1850	1884–1885		
William H. Brawley	1860	1891–1894		
Preston Brooks		1853–1857	expelled in 1839 for attempting to free his brother from prison; did not graduate	
Joseph R. Bryson	1920	1939–1953		
Sampson H. Butler		1839–1842	attended in the early 1820s; did not graduate	
William Butler	1810	1841–1843		
Patrick C. Caldwell	1820	1841–1843		
Carroll A. Campbell, Jr.		1979–1987	attended in the late 1950s; did not graduate	
John Campbell	1819	1837–1845		
Robert B. Campbell	1809	1823–1825; 1834–1837		
John Carter	1811	1822–1829		
William K. Clowney	1818	1833–1835; 1837–1839		
William F. Colcock	1823	1849–1853		
Theodore G. Croft	1897	1904–1905		
Mendel Jackson Davis	1970	1971–1981		
Warren R. Davis	1810	1827–1835		
Butler Derrick		1975–1995		
Frederick H. Dominick		1917–1933		
J. Edwin Ellerbe		1905–1913		
Franklin H. Elmore	1819	1836–1839	also United States senator	
John H. Evins	1853	1877–1884		
David E. Finley	1885	1899–1917		
Allard H. Gasque	1901	1923–1938		
Andrew R. Govan	1813	1822–1827		
Lindsey Graham	1977	1995–2003	also United States senator	
William J. Grayson	1809	1833–1837		
James Henry Hammond	1825	1835–1836	also United States senator and governor of South Carolina	
James Butler Hare	1947	1949–1951		
John J. Hemphill	1869	1883–1893		
Robert W. Hemphill	1936	1957–1964		
Kenneth Lamar Holland	1960	1975–1983		
John Jenrette	1962	1975–1980		
Laurence M. Keitt	1843	1853–1860		
George Swinton Legaré		1903–1913		
Hugh S. Legaré	1814	1837–1839		
Edward C. Mann	1906	1919–1921		
James Robert Mann	1947	1969–1979		
Richard Irvine Manning I	1811	1834–1836	also governor of South Carolina	
George McDuffie	1813	1821–1834	also United States senator and governor of South Carolina	
John L. McMillan		1939–1973		
Thomas S. McMillan	1912	1925–1939		
John J. McSwain	1897	1921–1936		
Stephen Decatur Miller	1808	1817–1819	also United States senator and governor of South Carolina	
George W. Murray		1893–1895; 1896–1897	attended in the early 1870s; did not graduate	
John Light Napier	1972	1981–1983		
Wilson Nesbitt		1817–1819	left after freshman year in 1805; did not graduate	
William T. Nuckolls	1820	1827–1833		
Liz J. Patterson		1987–1993	attended in the early 1960s; did not graduate	
William H. Perry		1885–1891	attended in the late 1850s; did not graduate	
Francis Wilkinson Pickens		1834–1841	attended in the late 1820s; did not graduate; also governor of South Carolina	
Henry L. Pinckney	1812	1833–1837		
J. Willard Ragsdale		1913–1919		
James P. Richards	1921	1933–1957		
John Peter Richardson II	1819	1836–1839	also governor of South Carolina	
John S. Richardson	1850	1879–1883		
L. Mendel Rivers		1941–1970	attended in the late 1920s; did not graduate	
James Rogers	1813	1835–1837; 1839–1843		
Eldred Simkins	1802 (approx.)	1818–1821	also lieutenant governor of South Carolina (1812–1814); also member of the South Carolina State Senate (1810–1812) and South Carolina House of Representatives	
Richard F. Simpson	1816	1843–1849		
Hugo S. Sims, Jr.	1947	1949–1951		
Floyd Spence	1952	1971–2001		
Robin Tallon	1966	1987–1993		
John C. Taylor	1919	1933–1939		
Waddy Thompson, Jr.	1814	1835–1841		
Samuel W. Trotti	1832	1842–1843		
Albert Watson	1950	1963–1971		
Joe Wilson	1972	2001–present		
Joseph A. Woodward		1843–1853	attended in the mid-1820s; did not graduate	

==== United States representatives and senators from other states ====
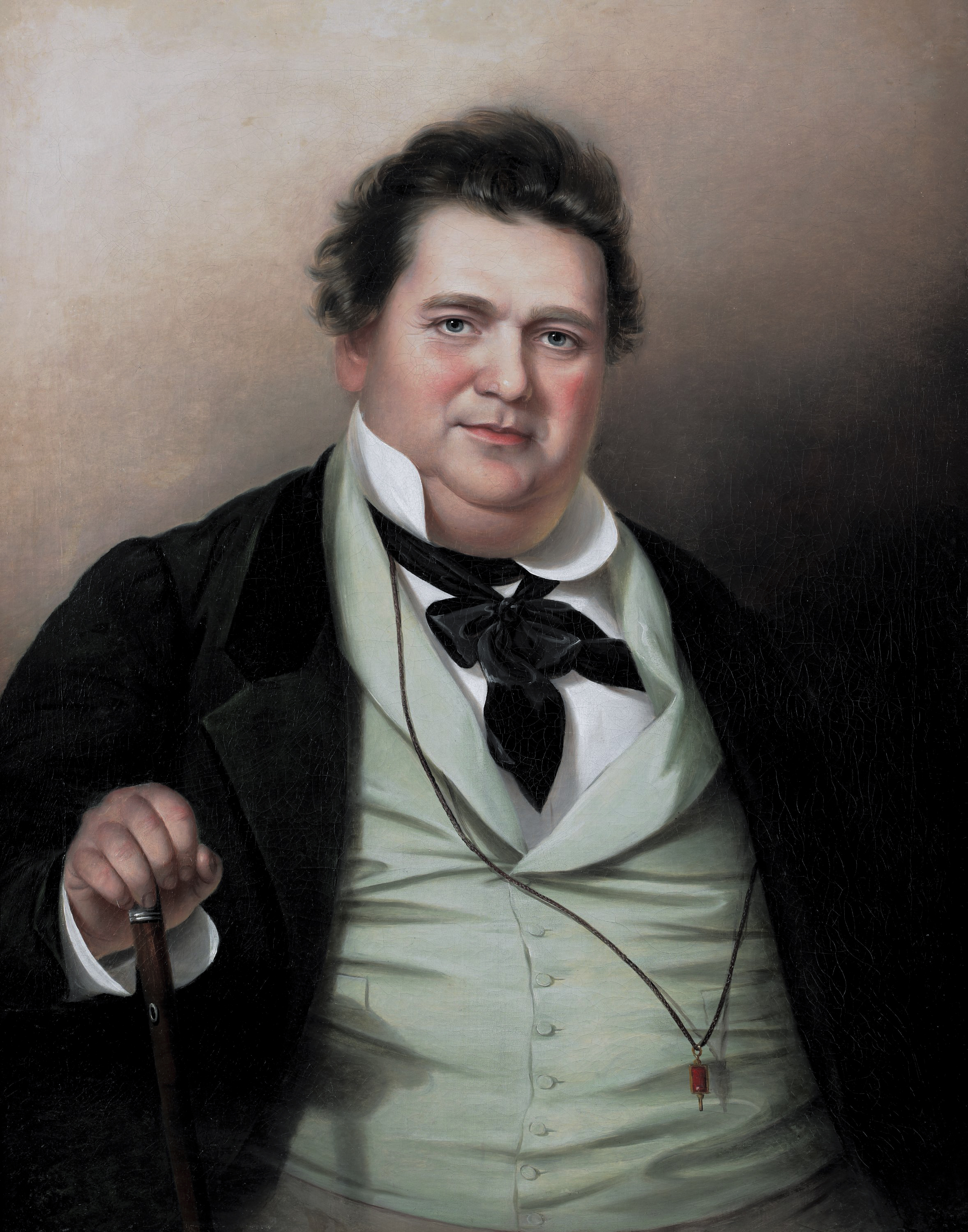
Dixon Hall Lewis

Name	Class year	Term in office	Notes	Reference
Mark Anthony Cooper	1819	1839–1841; 1842–1843	United States representative from Georgia	
David Funderburk	1974	1995–1997	United States representative from North Carolina	
Henry Washington Hilliard	1826	1845–1851	United States representative from Alabama	
John W. Johnston		1870–1883	United States senator from Virginia	
Lewis Charles Levin	1828	1845–1851	United States representative from Pennsylvania; first Jew elected to the United States Congress	
Dixon Hall Lewis	1820	1829–1844 H 1844–1848 S	United States representative and United States senator from Alabama	
Louis Wigfall	1837	1859–1861	United States senator from Texas	

==== Governors of South Carolina ====
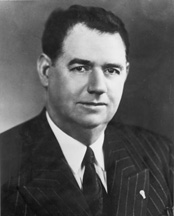
Olin D. Johnston

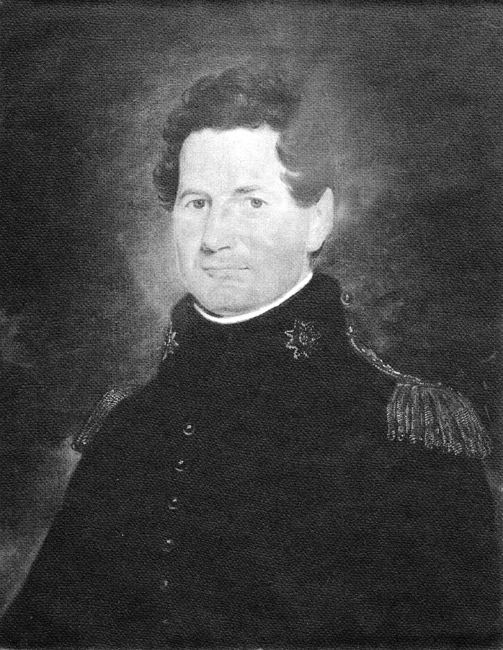
Richard Irvine Manning I

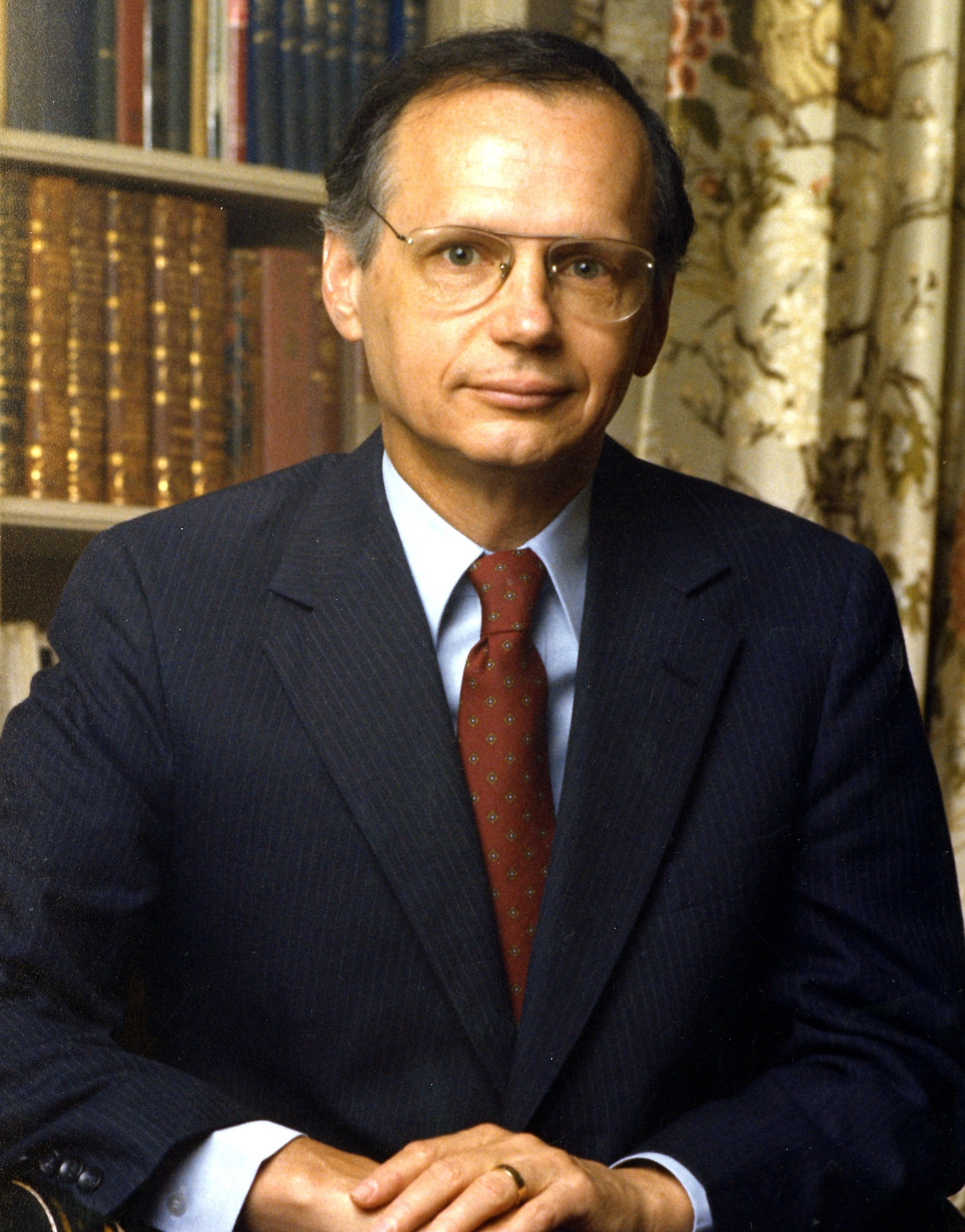
Richard Riley

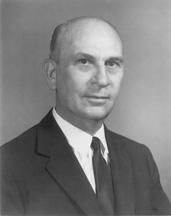
Donald S. Russell

Name	Class year	Term in office	Notes	Reference
William Aiken Jr.	1825	1844–1846	also United States representative	
David Beasley	1979	1995–1999		
Coleman Livingston Blease		1911–1915	expelled for plagiarism in 1888; did not graduate; also United States senator	
Milledge Luke Bonham	1834	1862–1864	also United States representative	
Carroll A. Campbell, Jr.		1987–1995	attended in the late 1950s, did not graduate	
John Drayton		1800–1802, 1808–1810	also United States federal judge	
John Geddes		1818–1820	attended in the mid-1810s; did not graduate	
William Henry Gist		1858–1860	expelled in 1827; did not graduate	
James Henry Hammond	1825	1842–1844	also United States senator and United States representative	
Wade Hampton III	1836	1877–1879	also United States senator	
Joseph Emile Harley	1902	1941–1942		
Jim Hodges	1979	1999–2003		
Ernest Hollings	1947	1959–1963	also United States senator	
Richard Manning Jefferies	1910	1942–1943		
Thomas Bothwell Jeter	1846	1880		
David Johnson		1846–1848	attended in the late 1820s; did not graduate	
Olin D. Johnston	1924	1935–1939; 1943–1945	also United States senator	
Andrew Gordon Magrath	1831	1864–1865		
John Lawrence Manning	1836	1852–1854		
Richard Irvine Manning I	1811	1824–1826	also United States representative	
George McDuffie	1813	1834–1836	also United States senator and United States representative	
Henry McMaster	1973	2017–incumbent	also South Carolina Attorney General and lieutenant governor of South Carolina	
Robert Evander McNair	1947	1965–1971		
John Hugh Means	1832	1850–1852		
Stephen Decatur Miller	1808	1828–1830	also United States senator and United States representative	
Franklin J. Moses, Jr.		1872–1874	dismissed from freshman class in 1855; did not graduate	
Francis Wilkinson Pickens		1860–1862	attended in the late 1820s; did not graduate; also United States representative	
John Peter Richardson II	1819	1840–1842	also United States representative	
John Peter Richardson III	1849	1886–1890		
Richard Riley	1959	1979–1987	also U.S. secretary of education	
Donald S. Russell	1925	1963–1965	also United States senator	
William Dunlap Simpson	1843	1879–1880		
George Bell Timmerman, Jr.	1937	1955–1959		
John C. West	1946	1971–1975		

==== Governors of other states ====
Name	Class year	Term in office	Notes	Reference
John B. Floyd	1829	1849–1852	governor of Virginia	
John Gayle	1815	1831–1835	governor of Alabama	
Charles James McDonald	1816	1839–1843	governor of Georgia	
William McWillie	1817	1857–1859	governor of Mississippi	
John Murphy	1808	1825–1829	governor of Alabama	

==== Military ====
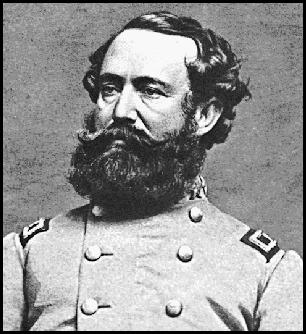
Wade Hampton III, commander of Hampton's Legion in the Civil War

Name	Class year	Notes	Reference
John Bratton	1850	Confederate general during the American Civil War	
Matthew Butler		attended in the late 1850s; did not graduate; Confederate general during the American Civil War	
James Ronald Chalmers	1851	Confederate general during the American Civil War	
John B. Floyd	1829	Confederate general during the American Civil War and governor of Virginia	
Kathryn Frost	1970	major general in the U.S. Army, at the time the highest-ranked woman in the Army, retired 2005	
Martin Witherspoon Gary		attended in the early 1850s; did not graduate; Confederate general during the American Civil War	
John W. Goodwin	1975	rear admiral, United States Navy, retired	
Maxcy Gregg	1835	Confederate general during the American Civil War	
Wade Hampton III	1836	Confederate general during the American Civil War, governor of South Carolina and United States senator	
Alexander Cheves Haskell	1860	Confederate colonel during the American Civil War	
James M. Kennedy	1884	military surgeon and brigadier general in the U.S. Army during World War I	
Samuel McGowan	1841	Confederate general during the American Civil War	
Jacob L. Shuford	1974	admiral and president of the Naval War College, Newport, Rhode Island, 2004–2008	
James Simons Sr.	1833	Confederate militia general during the American Civil War, state legislator	
John A. Wharton	1850	Confederate general during the American Civil War	
Knox H. White	Law school	mayor of Greenville, 1995–	

=== Religion and ministry ===
Name	Class year	Notes	Reference
Stephen Elliott	1825	first bishop of the Episcopal Diocese of Georgia	
Terrell Glenn	1980	bishop in the Anglican Church in North America	
Bryant Wright	1974	president of the Southern Baptist Convention	

== Faculty and administrators ==
Name	Years	Notes	Reference
Claire Jiménez		author, McCausland Faculty Fellow	
Nina Levine		professor of English, associate dean	

=== Former faculty and administrators ===
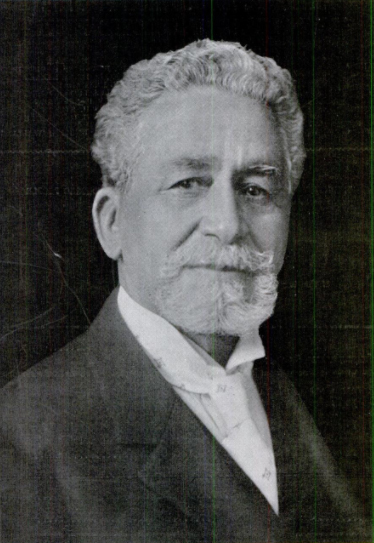
Richard Theodore Greener

Name	Years	Notes	Reference
Edward Porter Alexander	1867–1870	also chief of artillery in the Army of Northern Virginia under General Robert E. Lee and mathematics professor	
Augusta Braxton Baker	1980–1994	librarian and storyteller	
Robby Benson	1988–1990	actor	
Charles Bierbauer	2002–2025	former CNN senior Washington correspondent	
W. Lewis Burke		professor of law, historian of American race relations, and Black studies	
Thomas H. Buxton	???–1997	academic	
John R. Carpenter	1966–2000	geochemist	
Roger A. Coate	2001–2008	political scientist	
Thomas Cooper	1819–1834	educator, philosopher, and political leader	
John Mark Dean	1977–2002	conservationist and marine biologist	
James Dickey	1969–1997	poet and novelist; author of Deliverance	
Walter Edgar	1972–2012	South Carolina historian	
Donald Fowler	1966–1968; 1971–2020	former chairman of the Democratic National Committee	
Lawrence B. Glickman	1992–2014	historian of American consumerism	
Richard Theodore Greener	1873–1877	first Black person to graduate from Harvard University and first to teach at the University of South Carolina	
James N. Hardin Jr.	1939–2026	Germanist	
Alexander Cheves Haskell	1867–1868	professor of law	
John LeConte	1856–1869	geologist	
Joseph LeConte	1856–1870	geologist	
Francis Lieber	1835–1856	jurist and political philosopher	
John McLaren McBryde	1882–1888	Virginia Tech president	
Abioseh Nicol	1990–1991	author, diplomat from Sierra Leone; former under-secretary general of the United Nations	
Barry Preedom	1976–2006	physicist	
Jihan Sadat	1985–1986	widow of Anwar Sadat	
Emory M. Sneeden	1978–1982	United States Court of Appeals judge	
Vincent Van Brunt	19??-2019	chemical engineer	
Richard L. Walker	1957–1981	former United States ambassador to South Korea	

== Honorary degree recipients ==
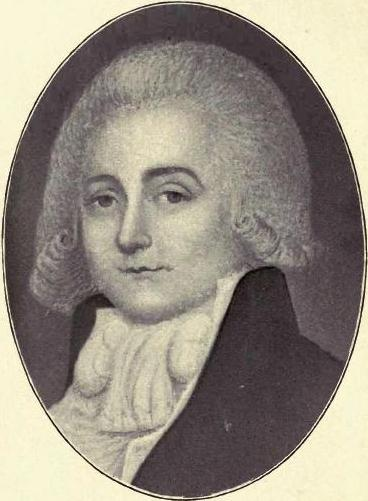
John Drayton

Name	Year issued	Notes	Reference
Robert Woodward Barnwell	1842	president of the University of South Carolina	
James F. Byrnes		governor of South Carolina	
Ellison Capers	1888	Confederate general during the American Civil War	
Thomas Green Clemson	1886	agriculturalist	
Thomas Cooper	1833	president of the University of South Carolina	
John Drayton	1807	governor of South Carolina; pushed for the foundation of South Carolina College to unite the state	
Helen Hayes	1979	actress	
Joseph B. Kershaw	1893	Confederate general during the American Civil War	
Hugh Smith Thompson	1900	governor of South Carolina	
Moses Waddel	1807	educator in South Carolina and Georgia	
