= 42d Mississippi Infantry Regiment =

Infantry regiment of the Confederate States Army

- Active: 1862–1865
- Disbanded: April 12, 1865
- Country: Confederate States
- Allegiance: Mississippi
- Branch: Army
- Type: Infantry
- Size: Regiment
- Part of: Davis' Brigade
- Facings: Light blue
- Arms: Enfield rifled muskets
- Battles: American Civil War; Battle of Gettysburg; Battle of Falling Waters; Battle of Bristoe Station; Battle of the Wilderness; Battle of Spotsylvania; Battle of Hanover Junction; Battle of Cold Harbor; Battle of Weldon Railroad; Battle of Fort Bratton; Battle of Hatcher's Run
- Battle honor: Gettysburg

Commanders
- Commanding officers: Col. Hugh R. Miller (POW) (DOW); Col. William A. Feeney †; Col. Andrew M. Nelson

The 42d Mississippi Infantry Regiment was an infantry formation of the Confederate States Army in the Eastern Theater of the American Civil War. It was successively commanded by Colonels Hugh R. Miller, William A. Feeney, and Andrew M. Nelson.

== History ==
The Forty-second was organized on May 14, 1862, in the Mississippi Volunteers at Oxford from the counties of Carroll, DeSoto, Tishomingo, Calhoun, Yalobusha, Panola, and Itawamba. For a time, it served on provost duty in Richmond, Virginia, then was assigned to Davis' Brigade, Heth's Division, Third Corps, Army of Northern Virginia.

The 42nd Regiment was engaged in fierce fighting during the Gettysburg, taking heavy casualties, with the brigade commander Col. Hugh R. Miller killed in action. In the aftermath of the Gettysburg campaign, the Regiment fought at the Battle of Bristoe Station after retreating into Virginia. It lost 46 percent of the 575 engaged at Gettysburg, had eight disabled en route from Pennsylvania, and had six killed and 25 wounded during the Bristoe Campaign.

In 1864, the 42nd took part in the Battle of the Wilderness, the Battle of Spotsylvania Court House, and the Battle of Cold Harbor, before joining the defense of Petersburg, Virginia. When the Union forces broke through the Confederate lines at Petersburg in early April, 1865, the remnants of the 42nd Regiment were captured and surrendered. The Regiment surrendered one lieutenant, one chaplain, and five enlisted men on April 9, 1865.

== Regimental order of battle ==
Units of the Forty-second Mississippi:

- Company A, "Carroll Fencibles"
- Company B, "Senatobia Invincibles"
- Company C, "Nelson's Avengers"
- Company D
- Company E, "Davenport Rifles"
- Company F, of Calhoun County
- Company G, "Gaston Rifles"
- Company H
- Company I, "Mississippi Reds"
- Company K

== Commanding officers ==
Commanding officers of the Forty-second Mississippi:

- Col. Hugh R. Miller, mortally wounded at Gettysburg, 1863.
- Col. William A. Feeney, killed at the Battle of the Wilderness, 1864.
- Col. Andrew M. Nelson, wounded at the Battle of the Wilderness, 1864.
- Lt. Col. Hillary Moseley, wounded and disabled at Gettysburg, 1863.

== See also ==
- List of Mississippi Civil War Confederate units

== Bibliography ==
- "Brig. Gen. Davis...". Memphis Daily Appeal. Vol. XV, no. 93. April 26, 1864. p. 1.
- Brown, Kent Masterson (2005). Gallagher, Gary W. (ed.). Retreat from Gettysburg: Lee, Logistics, and the Pennsylvania Campaign. Civil War in America. Chapel Hill: University of North Carolina Press. ISBN 978-0-8078-2921-9. OCLC 55488044.
- Coddington, Edwin B. (1979) [1st pub. Morningside Bookshop:1979]. The Gettysburg Campaign: A Study in Command (1st Touchstone ed.). New York: Simon & Schuster. ISBN 978-0-684-84569-2. OCLC 37565392.
- "From Weldon". North Carolina Standard. Vol. XIII, no. 34. April 24, 1863. p. 2.
- Gottfried, Bradley M. (2012) [1st pub. 2002]. Brigades of Gettysburg: The Union and Confederate Brigades at the Battle of Gettysburg. New York: Skyhorse Publishing. ISBN 978-1-61608-401-1. OCLC 738350721.
- Heth, Henry (1974). Morrison, James L. Jr. (ed.). The Memoirs of Henry Heth. Contributions in Military History, Number 6. Westport, Connecticut: Greenwood Press. ISBN 978-0-8371-6389-5. LCCN 72000820. OCLC 749406. OL 5282600M.
- "The Pennsylvania Campaign". Fayetteville Observer. Vol. XLVII, no. 2442. March 21, 1864. p. 4.
- "Prison Items". Richmond Dispatch. Vol. XXIII, no. 104. November 1, 1862. p. 2.
- Roberts, Bobby; Moneyhon, Carl (1993). A Photographic History of Mississippi in the Civil War. Portraits of Conflict. Fayetteville: University of Arkansas Press. ISBN 978-1-55728-260-6. LCCN 92021637. OL 1718833M.
- Stewart, George R. (1959). Pickett's Charge: A Microhistory of the Final Attack at Gettysburg, July 3, 1863. Boston: Houghton Mifflin. LCCN 59-8864.
- Wilson, LeGrand James (1973) [1st pub. 1902]. Silver, James W. (ed.). The Confederate Soldier. Memphis, Tennessee: Memphis State University Press. ISBN 978-0-87870-016-5. LCCN 72-95936.
- "Yankee Faithlessness". Richmond Dispatch. Vol. XXV, no. 55. September 3, 1863. p. 1.
