= Hugh R. Miller =

American politician (1812-1863)

Member of the Mississippi House of Representatives from Pontotoc County
- In office November 21, 1842 – November 18, 1844 Serving with John A. Bradford
- Preceded by: John A. Bradford
- Succeeded by: Charles D. Fontaine; E. Milsaps

Personal details
- Born: Hugh Reid Miller; May 14, 1812 Abbeville District, South Carolina, U.S.
- Died: July 19, 1863 (aged 51) Adams County, Pennsylvania, U.S.
- Cause of death: Wounded in action
- Resting place: Odd Fellows Rest Cemetery, Aberdeen, Mississippi, U.S.
- Party: Whig
- Spouse: Susan G. Walton (m. 1839)
- Children: 2
- Education: South Carolina College (AB)
- Occupation: Politician; lawyer; judge

Military service
- Allegiance: Confederate States
- Branch: Army
- Years of service: 1861–1863
- Rank: Colonel
- Commands: Company G, 2d Mississippi Infantry Regiment (1861–62); 42d Mississippi Infantry Regiment (1862–63)
- Battles: American Civil War; Battle of First Manassas; Siege of Suffolk; Battle of Gettysburg (POW) (DOW)

Hugh Reid Miller (May 14, 1812 – July 19, 1863) was a senior officer of the Confederate States Army who commanded infantry in the Eastern Theater of the American Civil War. An American lawyer before the war, he served as a member of the Mississippi House of Representatives from 1842 to 1844.

== Biography ==
Miller was born in South Carolina in 1812, and moved to Pontotoc, Mississippi in 1835. He became a prosperous lawyer, planter, and slaveowner, holding ten people as slaves in 1860.

Miller represented Pontotoc county in the Mississippi legislature in the 1840s, and as tensions rose following the 1860 election of Abraham Lincoln, he was elected as a delegate to Mississippi's secession convention in January, 1861. His brother Andrew also served as a delegate, and both voted for the pro-secessionist position.

Enlisting in the Confederate Army at the outbreak of the American Civil War, Hugh Miller was elected as captain of a company in the 2nd Mississippi Infantry Regiment, then as colonel of the 42nd Mississippi in the Army of Northern Virginia.

Miller was mortally wounded at the Battle of Gettysburg on the third day (July 3, 1863) while in temporary command of Joseph R. Davis' brigade.

== See also ==
- List of University of South Carolina people

Mississippi House of Representatives
Preceded by John A. Bradford	Member of the Mississippi House of Representatives from Pontotoc County; 1842–1844; With: John A. Bradford	Succeeded by Charles D. Fontaine; E. Milsaps
Military offices
New regiment	Commanding officer of the 42d Mississippi Infantry Regiment; 1862–1863	Succeeded by Colonel William A. Feeney
