= Whit Merrifield =

American baseball player (born 1989)

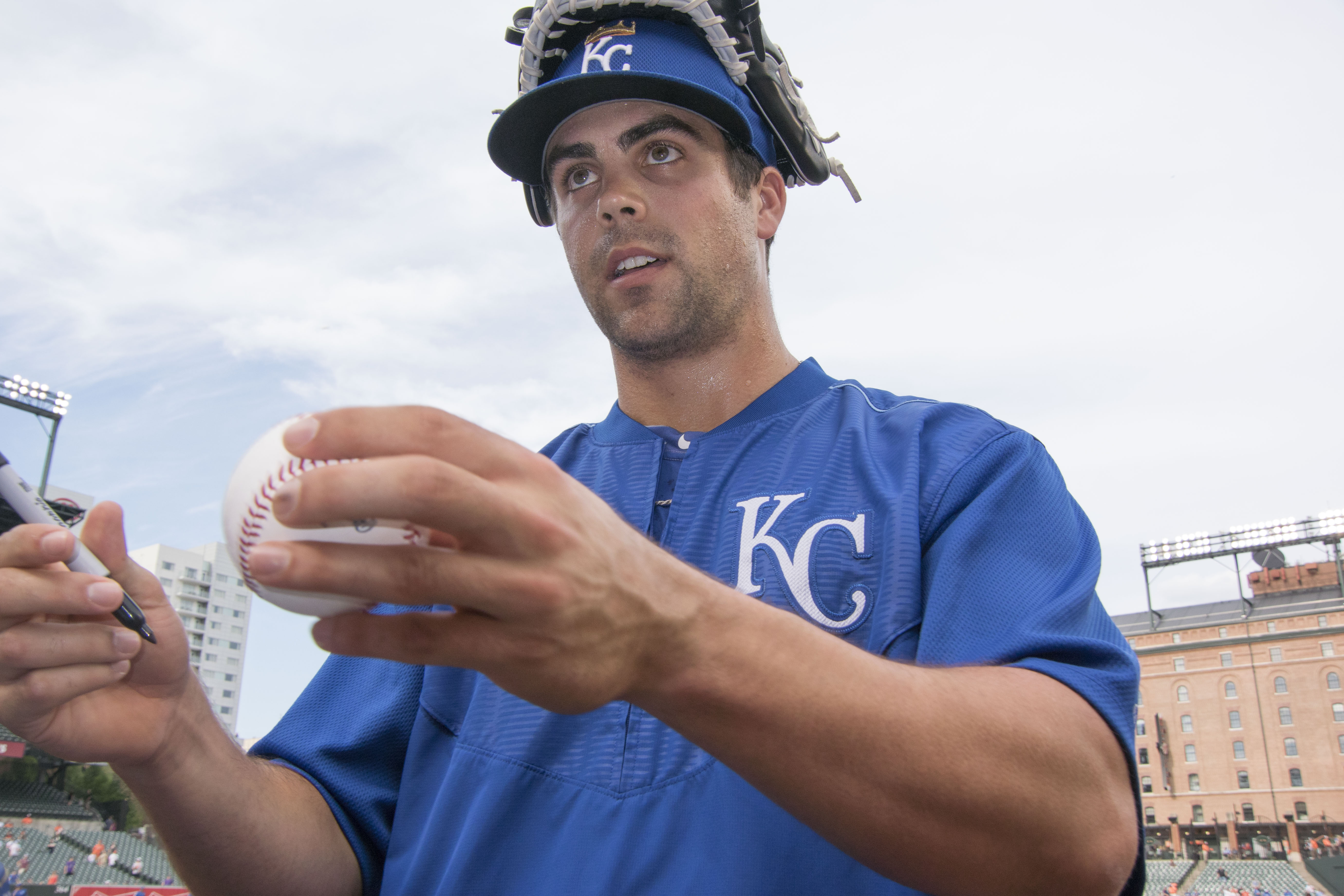
- Merrifield with the Kansas City Royals in 2016
- Second baseman / Outfielder
- Born: January 24, 1989 (age 37); Florence, South Carolina, U.S.
- Batted: Right Threw: Right

MLB debut
- May 18, 2016, for the Kansas City Royals

Last MLB appearance
- September 30, 2024, for the Atlanta Braves

MLB statistics
- Batting average: .280
- Home runs: 94
- Runs batted in: 485
- Stolen bases: 218
- Stats at Baseball Reference

Teams
- Kansas City Royals (2016–2022); Toronto Blue Jays (2022–2023); Philadelphia Phillies (2024); Atlanta Braves (2024)

Career highlights and awards
- 3× All-Star (2019, 2021, 2023); 3× AL stolen base leader (2017, 2018, 2021)

Whitley David Merrifield (born January 24, 1989) is an American former professional baseball second baseman and outfielder who played nine seasons in Major League Baseball (MLB) for the Kansas City Royals, Toronto Blue Jays, Philadelphia Phillies, and Atlanta Braves. Merrifield was a three-time All-Star and led the American League in stolen bases three times.

== Amateur career ==
Merrifield graduated from Davie County High School in Mocksville, North Carolina. He enrolled at the University of South Carolina and played college baseball for the South Carolina Gamecocks from 2008 to 2010. In 2008, he played collegiate summer baseball for the Yarmouth–Dennis Red Sox of the Cape Cod Baseball League, and in 2009 returned to the league to play with the Chatham Anglers. In the second game of the championship series at the 2010 College World Series, Merrifield hit a game-winning RBI single in the bottom of the 11th inning to give South Carolina the championship. In his three years at South Carolina, he played in 195 games and hit .329/.389/.489 with 27 home runs. In 2010, he set a Gamecocks record with a 26-game hitting streak.

== Professional career ==
=== Kansas City Royals ===
The Kansas City Royals selected Merrifield in the ninth round of the 2010 Major League Baseball draft. He signed with the Royals and made his professional debut that season with the Burlington Bees. In 47 games he hit .253/.317/.409 with five home runs and 26 RBIs. In 2011, Merrifield played for the Wilmington Blue Rocks where he batted .262 with five home runs and 36 RBIS. In 2012, with both Wilmington and the Northwest Arkansas Naturals, he compiled a .258 batting average with nine home runs and 44 RBIs in 125 games between both teams. He spent 2013 with Northwest Arkansas where he batted .270/.319/.391 with three home runs and 43 RBIs in 94 games.

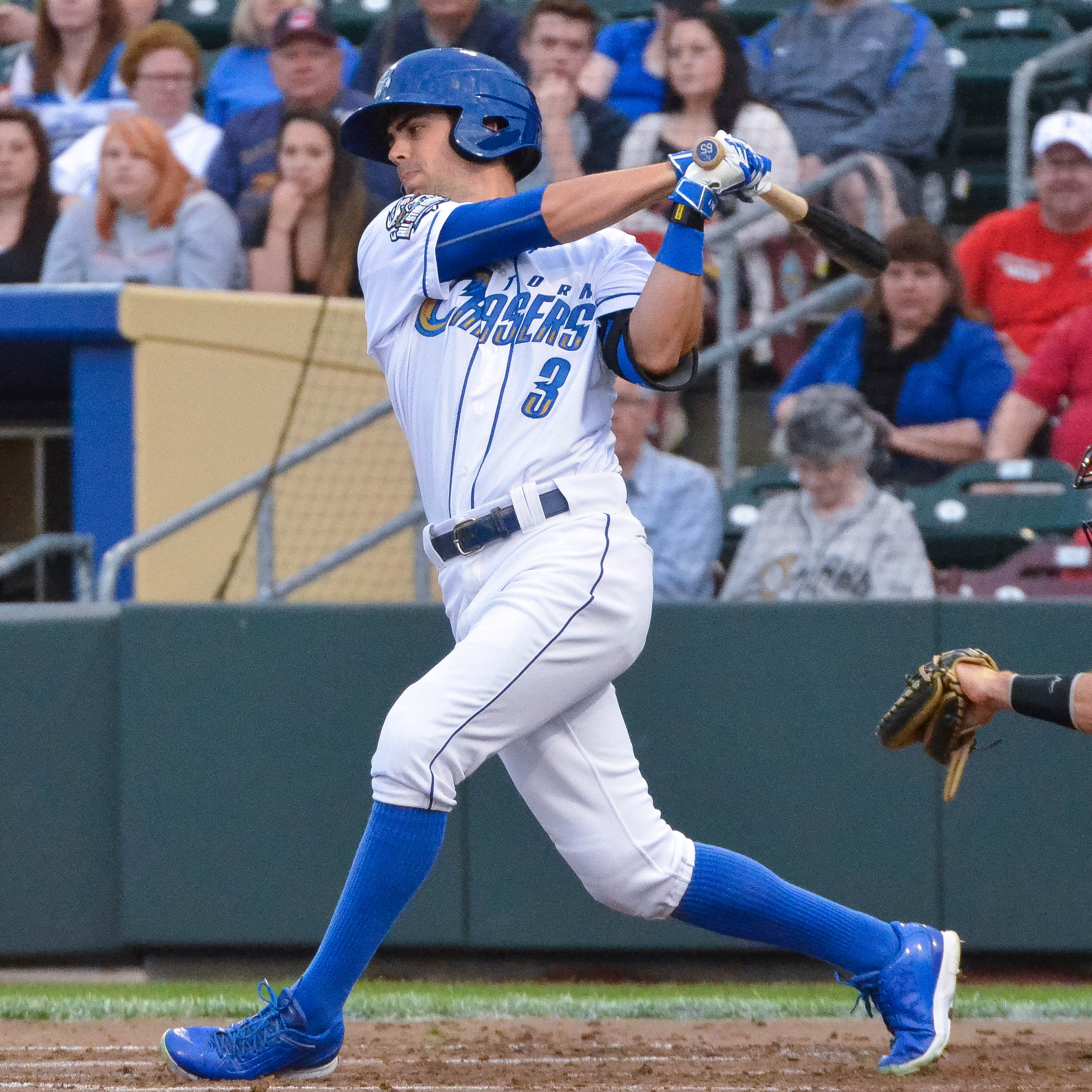
Merrifield batting for the Omaha Storm Chasers in 2015

Merrifield returned to Northwest Arkansas to start 2014 and was promoted to the Omaha Storm Chasers during the season. In 120 games between the two clubs, he slashed .319/.371/.470 with eight home runs and 49 RBIs. In 2015, Merrifield played for Omaha where he posted a .265 batting average with five home runs and 38 RBIs in 135 games. He returned to Omaha to start the 2016 season.

Merrifield made his major league debut with the Kansas City Royals on May 18, 2016, instantly batting in the top third of the lineup and soon taking the starting second baseman job from Omar Infante. His first Major League hit came off of David Price. On June 13, Merrifield hit both his first major league triple and home run against the Cleveland Indians. In early July 2016, a song and video tribute to Merrifield titled "Cool Whit" received coverage on local Kansas City radio and TV news. He was optioned back to Omaha in July and recalled in September. In 69 games for Omaha he batted .266 with eight home runs and 29 RBIs, and in 81 games for Kansas City he compiled a .283 batting average with two home runs, 29 RBIs, and 22 doubles.

Merrifield began the 2017 season with Omaha, but was recalled in April after nine games and spent the remainder of the season with Kansas City. With the Royals, he hit .288 in 145 games with 19 home runs and 78 RBIs. He also led the American League with 34 stolen bases, the fewest total for a league leader since Luis Aparicio led the AL with 31 in 1962. In 2018, Merrifield hit .304/.367/.438 and led the majors in hits (192) and stolen bases (45).

In 2019, Merrifield batted .302/.348/.463 and led the major leagues in games (162), at bats (681), singles (139), triples (10), and line drive percentage (28.2%), while stealing 20 bases and leading the majors in caught stealing (10).

Overall with the 2020 Kansas City Royals in the Covid-shortened season, Merrifield batted .282 with nine home runs and 30 RBIs in 60 games.

In 2021, Merrifield hit .277/.317/.395 with 10 home runs and 74 RBIs. He tied for the MLB lead with 42 doubles, and led the American League with 40 steals. He also tied for the major league lead in sacrifice flies, with 12. On defense, he led all major league second basemen with 283 putouts, 103 double plays and a 4.77 range factor. He won a Fielding Bible Award for his defensive excellence. Merrifield played in a franchise-record 553 consecutive games for the Royals between June 2018 and July 2022.

=== Toronto Blue Jays ===
On August 2, 2022, Merrifield was traded to the Toronto Blue Jays for Max Castillo and Samad Taylor. He was among ten Royals players who were in violation of Canada's COVID-19 vaccination requirement and unable to travel to Toronto for a four-game weekend series right before the All-Star break two weeks earlier in July. On August 4, 2022, Merrifield announced that he was now vaccinated and would be able to play in the team's first game in Toronto since being acquired.

In 2022 he batted .250/.298/.375 in 550 plate appearances, and was the only qualified batter in the major leagues who was not hit by a pitch all year. He became a free agent following the 2023 season.

=== Philadelphia Phillies ===
On February 19, 2024, Merrifield signed a one-year, $8 million contract with the Philadelphia Phillies. In 53 games with the team, Merrifield struggled offensively, batting .199/.277/.295. He was released by the Phillies on July 12.

=== Atlanta Braves ===
On July 22, 2024, Merrifield signed a major league contract with the Atlanta Braves. On September 7, Merrifield was diagnosed with a fractured left foot, and was sidelined for a short amount of time but not placed on the injured list. In 42 appearances for Atlanta, he batted .248/.348/.336 with one home run, four RBI, and six stolen bases.

On June 24, 2025, Merrifield announced his retirement from professional baseball via social media.

== International career ==
On September 10, 2018, he was selected by the MLB All-Stars at 2018 MLB Japan All-Star Series.

== Personal life ==
Merrifield married his wife, Jordan Michael, on December 28, 2019.

Merrifield's father, Bill, played college baseball for Wake Forest University, and spent six seasons in Minor League Baseball, primarily as a third baseman. In September 1987, Bill Merrifield was briefly on the active roster of the Pittsburgh Pirates, but was sent to the Florida Instructional League without making an MLB appearance, rendering him a phantom ballplayer.

Merrifield actively co-runs the 6ix Inning Podcast, which he created with sports reporter Lindsay Dunn. The show discusses MLB news with a primary focus on the Toronto Blue Jays.

== See also ==
- List of Major League Baseball annual doubles leaders
- List of Major League Baseball annual triples leaders
- List of University of South Carolina people
- Major League Baseball consecutive games played streaks

Achievements
Preceded by Charlie Blackmon	Major League Baseball annual hits leader 2018–2019	Succeeded by Trea Turner
