= Toney J. Lister =

American politician

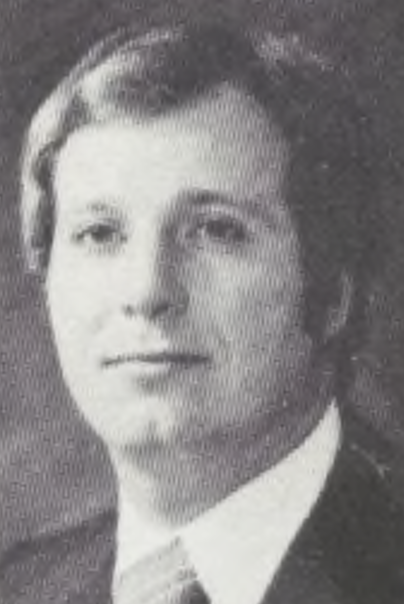
- Lister in 1977

Member of the South Carolina House of Representatives from the 37th district
- In office 1975–1979
- Preceded by: District established
- Succeeded by: William R. Lee

Personal details
- Born: Toney Joe Lister; May 26, 1946 (age 80) Spartanburg, South Carolina, U.S.
- Party: Republican
- Education: University of South Carolina

Toney Joe Lister (born May 26, 1946) is an American politician. A member of the Republican Party, he served in the South Carolina House of Representatives from 1975 to 1979.

== Life and career ==
Lister was born in Spartanburg, South Carolina, the son of Paul Ford Lister and Nellie Vaughn. He attended the University of South Carolina, earning his BS degree and his JD degree. After earning his degrees, he worked as a lawyer.

Lister served in the South Carolina House of Representatives from 1975 to 1979.
