= Amy Leventer =

American paleoclimatologist

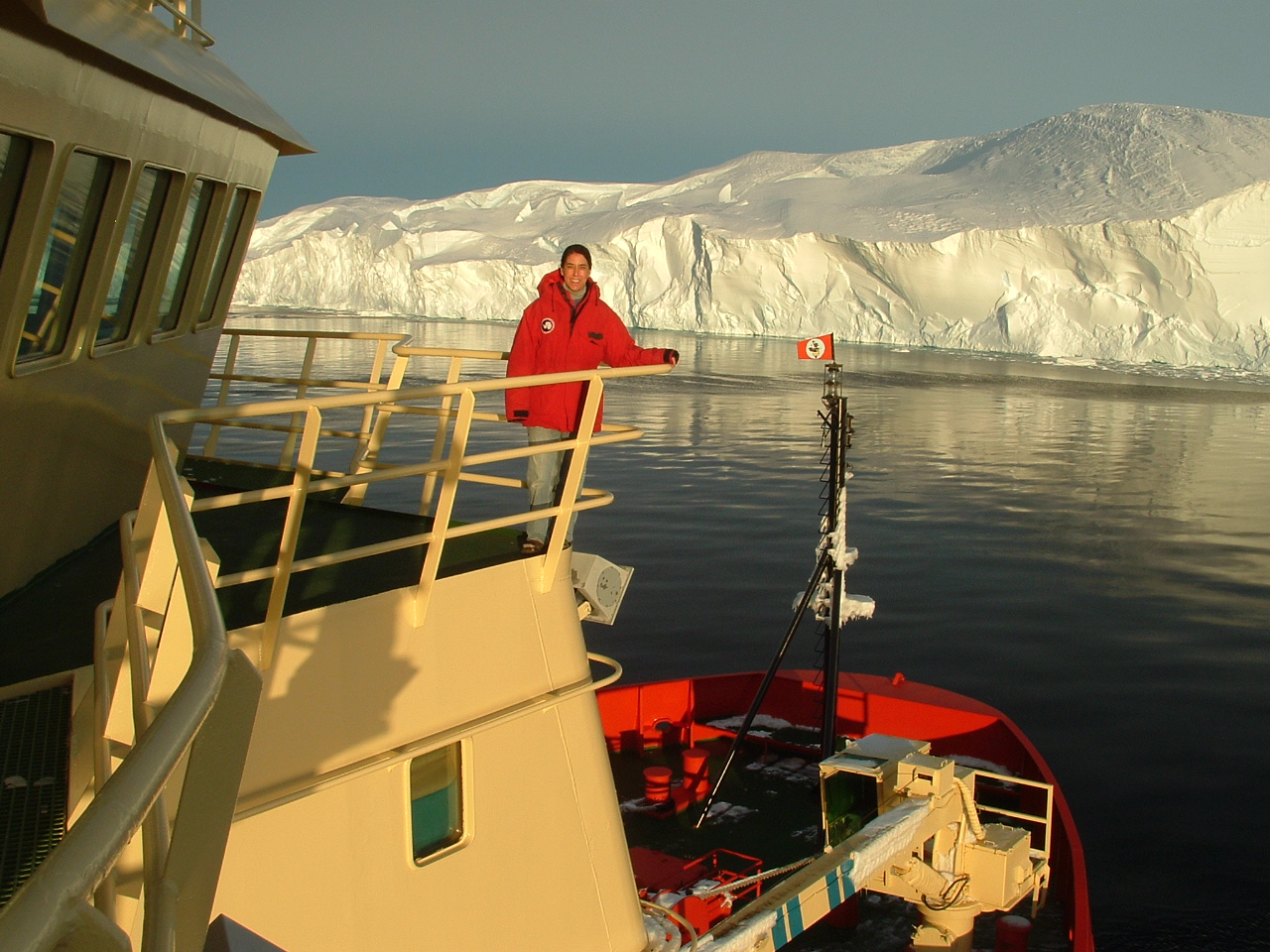
- Amy Leventer aboard the R/V Palmer
- Education: BSc Brown University; MSc University of South Carolina; PhD Rice University
- Scientific career
- Fields: Paleoclimatology; Oceanography
- Workplaces: Colgate University
- Website: Amy Leventer at Colgate University

Amy Leventer is an American Antarctic researcher and academic specialising in micropaleontology, with specific research interests in marine geology, marine biology, and climate change. Since 1983, Leventer has participated in over 25 scientific research expeditions to Antarctica.

== Early life and education ==
Leventer grew up in Framingham, Massachusetts, and Congers, New York. As a child she collected seashells, pebbles, insects, leaves and flowers. She always tried to organise things by what they looked like and order the items that she saw around her. Leventer attended Brown University to study a Bachelors of science in aquatic biology in 1979, followed by a Masters at the University of South Carolina in 1982 and a PhD in geology from Rice University in 1988.

== Career and impact ==
Leventer started her post-doctoral research at Ohio State University (1989–92) where she received the Byrd Postdoctoral Fellowship, and she continued with research and teaching appointments at Otterbein College (1990–94) and the University of Minnesota (1994–97). She was appointed a Visiting Assistant Professor at Colgate University in 1997, promoted to Associate Professor in 2003 and to Full Professor in 2013. She served as Chair of the Department of Geology from 2009 to 2012 and is currently the chair of Colgate's Research Council. Her teaching impact has been recognised by nomination for the Phi Eta Sigma student award on three occasions, and she has mentored more than 50 research and independent study students.

Leventer specialises in marine geology, biological oceanography, and paleoclimatology. Her research involves the study of climate change over geological time through analysis of the sedimentary fossil record from Antarctica, where she has travelled many times since 1983. She was Chief Scientist on a 2014 international research cruise to Antarctica to evaluate the recent and longer-term behavior of glacial systems. Among almost 50 scientific publications, Leventer has three co-authored articles in the prestigious journal Nature.

== Awards and honors ==
- 1998: Distinguished Visiting Scholar, Queen's University, Kingston Canada
- 1989: Byrd Postdoctoral Fellowship, Byrd Polar Research Center, Ohio State University
- 2019: Goldthwait Polar Medal
- 2025: Geological Society of America Fellow

== Selected works ==
- Leventer, Amy, et al. "Productivity cycles of 200–300 years in the Antarctic Peninsula region: understanding linkages among the sun, atmosphere, oceans, sea ice, and biota." Geological Society of America Bulletin 108.12 (1996): 1626–1644.
- Smith, Raymond C., et al. "Marine Ecosystem Sensitivity to Climate Change Historical observations and paleoecological records reveal ecological transitions in the Antarctic Peninsula region." BioScience 49.5 (1999): 393–404.
- Leventer, Amy. et al., "Marine sediment record from the East Antarctic margin reveals dynamics of ice sheet recession." "GSA Today" 16.12 (2006): 4-10.
- Mackintosh, Andrew, et al., "Retreat history of the East Antarctic Ice Sheet since the Last Glacial Maximum." "Quaternary Science Reviews" 100.15 (2014): 10–30.
