= Nina Levine =

Nina Levine (born 1950) is a professor of English language and literature at the University of South Carolina. Levine's area of expertise include Early modern literature, culture and Shakespeare. Levine is also the Associate Dean for Arts, Humanities and Social Sciences in the university's McCausland College of Arts and Sciences. Born in 1950, Levine received her Ph.D. from Tulane University in 1991. Her thesis was titled "'To Play the Amazon': patterns of female domination in Shakespeare's history plays."

== Books ==
Levine's books include:

- ——— (2016). Practicing the City: Early Modern London on Stage. Fordham University Press. ISBN 9780823267866.
- Shakespeare, William (2011). ——— (ed.). Richard III: The Evans Shakespeare Series. Boston: Wadsworth/Cengage. ISBN 978-0495911241.
- ———; Miller, David Lee, eds. (2009). A touch more rare: Harry Berger, Jr., and the arts of interpretation (1st ed.). New York: Fordham University Press. ISBN 9780823230303.
- ——— (1998). Women's matters: politics, gender, and nation in Shakespeare's early history plays. Newark : London: University of Delaware Press ; Associated University Presses. ISBN 0-87413-654-7.

== Awards and honors ==
In 1999, she received the University of South Carolina’s Michael J. Mungo Undergraduate Teaching Award.
