= Jacob L. Shuford =

American naval admiral

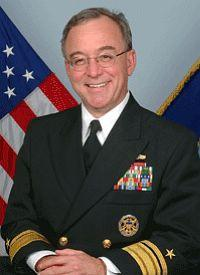
- Born: April 18, 1952 (age 74); Bishopville, South Carolina, U.S.
- Military career
- Allegiance: United States of America
- Branch: United States Navy
- Service years: 1974–2009
- Rank: Rear Admiral
- Commands: USS Aries (PHM-5); USS Rodney M. Davis (FFG-60); USS Gettysburg (CG-64); USS Abraham Lincoln Carrier Strike Group; President of the Naval War College
- Conflicts: Cold War; Kosovo War; Operation Desert Fox
- Awards: Navy Distinguished Service Medal; Defense Superior Service Medal; Legion of Merit (five awards); Bronze Star Medal; Meritorious Service Medal (three awards); Commendation Medal (three awards); Navy Achievement Medal

Jacob Lawrence Shuford (born April 18, 1952) was a rear admiral of the United States Navy. His career included service in the Cold War, Kosovo War, and Operation Desert Fox. He commanded surface combatants, served on the staffs of the Chief of Naval Operations, the Joint Chiefs of Staff, and the Secretary of the Navy, coordinated Navy legislative activities in the United States Senate, and his final assignment as President of the Naval War College.

== Naval career ==
Shuford was commissioned in 1974 from the Naval Reserve Officer Training Corps (NROTC) program at the University of South Carolina. He began his career at sea aboard the frigate USS Blakely (FF-1072), then served as the operations officer consecutively aboard the destroyer USS Deyo (DD-989) and aboard the guided-missile destroyer USS Mahan (DDG-42). He later commanded the missile hydrofoil USS Aries (PHM-5), operating extensively throughout the Caribbean Sea, and the guided-missile frigate USS Rodney M. Davis (FFG-60). Under his command, Rodney M. Davis was a Battle "E" winner as part of the USS Independence (CV-62) Carrier Battle Group operating in the Western Pacific and the Persian Gulf.

In January 1998, Shuford assumed command of the guided-missile cruiser USS Gettysburg (CG-64), deploying to the operating areas of the Fifth and Sixth Fleets with the USS Enterprise (CVN-65) Carrier Battle Group. While he was her commanding officer, Gettysburg played a prominent role in operations in the Adriatic Sea during the Kosovo crisis and in the Persian Gulf during Operation Desert Fox in December 1998, acting as Air Warfare Commander for dual carrier battle group operations by the USS Carl Vinson (CVN-70) and USS Enterprise (CVN-65) Carrier Battle Groups and successfully firing all 69 of the Tomahawk cruise missiles she was tasked to fire during strike operations. Gettysburg was awarded the Battle Efficiency "E" for Cruiser-Destroyer Group 12.

Shuford's first shore tour was as the Operations and Plans Officer for Commander, Naval Forces Korea. In Washington, D.C., he served on the staff of the Chief of Naval Operations in OPNAV N86, directing the Surface Combatant Force Level Study, and in OPNAV N3/N5 as chief of staff for the Navy's Roles and Missions Organization. He also served as speechwriter and Special Assistant to the United States Secretary of the Navy. On the Joint Staff, he led a division in the Force Structure, Resources, and Assessments Directorate (J8).

From 1999 to 2001, Shuford coordinated the Navy's legislative efforts in the United States Senate, and was selected to flag rank in this assignment. His first flag tour was as the Navy's "Head Detailer," responsible for career development and assignment for the 370,000 personnel of the Navy.

Shuford was selected as an Olmsted Scholar in 1979, studying for two years in France at the Paris Institute of Political Science. He also received master's degrees in public administration from Harvard University with a concentration in finance and in national security studies and strategy from the Naval War College in Newport, Rhode Island, from which he graduated in 1991 with highest distinction.

From 12 August 2004 to 6 November 2008, Shuford served as the 51st President of the Naval War College, overseeing senior education and wargaming for the Navy. During his lengthy presidency, he directed an extensive restructuring of the college's basic curriculum and initiated the Joint Force Maritime Component Commander Course for flag officers, the Maritime Staff Operators Course, and the Naval Operational Planner Course (NOPC). He led the college as it played the key role in designing the process for establishing a new national maritime strategy and in providing the geostrategic analysis to support it. He reinstituted Title 10 wargaming and initiated concept-development efforts to explore important warfare issues such as maritime ballistic missile defense, antisubmarine warfare, homeland defense organization, and the command and control of maritime forces. He also engaged in extensive diplomacy to establish an international network of naval colleges that could collaborate on the study of maritime security issues.

Admiral Shuford retired from the Navy in 2009.

== Notes ==
Military offices
Preceded by Ronald A. Route	President of the Naval War College; 12 August 2004–6 November 2008	Succeeded by James P. "Phil" Wisecup
