= Political party strength in South Carolina =

Politics in the US state of South Carolina

The following table indicates the parties of elected officials in the U.S. state of South Carolina:

- Governor
- Lieutenant Governor
- Secretary of State
- Attorney General
- Treasurer
- Comptroller General
- Superintendent of Education
- Adjutant General (no longer elected after 2014; appointed by governor beginning in 2019)
- Commissioner of Agriculture

The table also indicates the historical party composition in the:

- State Senate
- State House of Representatives
- State delegation to the U.S. Senate
- State delegation to the U.S. House of Representatives

For years in which a presidential election was held, the table indicates which party's nominees received the state's electoral votes.

Bold indicates present office holders.

== 1776–1864 ==
Year	Executive offices						State Legislature		United States Congress			Electoral votes
Year	Governor	Lt. Governor	Sec. of State	Atty. Gen.	Comptroller	Adj. Gen.	State Senate	State House	U.S. Senator (Class II)	U.S. Senator (Class III)	U.S. House	Electoral votes
1776	John Rutledge (I) (Note: President under the Articles of Confederation chosen by the General Assembly.) (Note: Resigned.)	Henry Laurens (I)	[?]	Alexander Moultrie	no such office	[?]	Ind.		no such offices			
1777	John Rutledge (I)	James Parsons (I)	[?]	Alexander Moultrie	no such office	[?]	Ind.		no such offices			
1778	Rawlins Lowndes (I) (Note: Imprisoned by British during American Revolution.)	James Parsons (I)	[?]	Alexander Moultrie	no such office	[?]	Ind.		no such offices			
1779	John Rutledge (I) (Note: Governor under the Articles of Confederation chosen by the General Assembly.)	Thomas Bee (I)	[?]	Alexander Moultrie	no such office	Pierce Butler	Ind.	Ind.	no such offices			
1780	John Rutledge (I)	Christopher Gadsden (I)	[?]	Alexander Moultrie	no such office	Pierce Butler	Ind.	Ind.	no such offices			
1781	John Rutledge (I)	Christopher Gadsden (I)	[?]	Alexander Moultrie	no such office	Pierce Butler	Ind.	Ind.	no such offices			
1782	John Mathews (I)	Richard Hutson (I)	[?]	Alexander Moultrie	no such office	Pierce Butler	Ind.	Ind.	no such offices			
1783	Benjamin Guerard (I)	Richard Beresford (I)	John Vanderhorst	Alexander Moultrie	no such office	Pierce Butler	Ind.	Ind.	no such offices			
1784	Benjamin Guerard (I)	William Moultrie (I)	John Vanderhorst	Alexander Moultrie	no such office	Pierce Butler	Ind.	Ind.	no such offices			
1785	William Moultrie (I)	Charles Drayton (I)	John Vanderhorst	Alexander Moultrie	no such office	Pierce Butler	Ind.	Ind.	no such offices			
1786	William Moultrie (I)	Charles Drayton (I)	John Vanderhorst	Alexander Moultrie	no such office	Pierce Butler	Ind.	Ind.	no such offices			
1787	Thomas Pinckney (F)	Thomas Gadsden (F)	Peter Freneau (DR)	Alexander Moultrie	no such office	Pierce Butler	F maj.	F maj.	no such offices			
1788	Thomas Pinckney (F)	Thomas Gadsden (F)	Peter Freneau (DR)	Alexander Moultrie	no such office	Pierce Butler	F maj.	F maj.	no such offices			
1789	Charles Pinckney (F)	Alexander Gillon (F)	Peter Freneau (DR)	Alexander Moultrie	no such office	Pierce Butler	F maj.	F maj.	Pierce Butler (PA)	Ralph Izard (PA)	3AA, 2PA	Washington (I) ✓
1790	Charles Pinckney (F)	Alexander Gillon (F)	Peter Freneau (DR)	Alexander Moultrie	[?]	Pierce Butler	F maj.	F maj.	Pierce Butler (PA)	Ralph Izard (PA)	3AA, 2PA	Washington (I) ✓
1791	Charles Pinckney (F)	Isaac Holmes (F)	Peter Freneau (DR)	Alexander Moultrie	[?]	Pierce Butler	F maj.	F maj.	Pierce Butler (PA)	Ralph Izard (PA)	3PA, 2AA	Washington (I) ✓
1792	William Moultrie (F)	James Ladson (F)	Peter Freneau (DR)	John Julius Pringle	[?]	Laurence Manning	F maj.	F maj.	Pierce Butler (AA)	Ralph Izard (PA)	3PA, 2AA	Washington (I) ✓
1793	William Moultrie (F)	James Ladson (F)	Peter Freneau (DR)	John Julius Pringle	[?]	Laurence Manning	F maj.	F maj.	Pierce Butler (AA)	Ralph Izard (PA)	5AA, 1PA	Washington (I) ✓
1794	Arnoldus Vanderhorst (F)	Lewis Morris (F)	Peter Freneau (DR)	John Julius Pringle	[?]	Laurence Manning	F maj.	F maj.	Pierce Butler (DR)	Ralph Izard (PA)	4AA, 2PA	Washington (I) ✓
1795	Arnoldus Vanderhorst (F)	Lewis Morris (F)	Stephen Ravenel	John Julius Pringle	[?]	Laurence Manning	F maj.	F maj.	Pierce Butler (DR)	Jacob Read (F)	4DR, 2AA	Washington (I) ✓
1796	Charles Pinckney (DR)	Robert Anderson (DR)	Stephen Ravenel	John Julius Pringle	[?]	Laurence Manning	DR maj.	F maj.	Pierce Butler (DR)	Jacob Read (F)	4DR, 2AA	Washington (I) ✓
1797	Charles Pinckney (DR)	Robert Anderson (DR)	Stephen Ravenel	John Julius Pringle	[?]	Laurence Manning	DR maj.	F maj.	John Hunter (DR)	Jacob Read (F)	3DR, 3F	Jefferson (DR) ✗
1798	Edward Rutledge (F) (Note: Died in office.)	John Drayton (DR)	Stephen Ravenel	John Julius Pringle	[?]	Laurence Manning	DR maj.	DR maj.	John Hunter (DR)	Jacob Read (F)	3DR, 3F	Jefferson (DR) ✗
1799	Edward Rutledge (F)	John Drayton (DR)	Isaac Motte Dart	John Julius Pringle	[?]	Laurence Manning	DR maj.	DR maj.	Charles Pinckney (DR)	Jacob Read (F)	5F, 1DR	Jefferson (DR) ✗
1800	John Drayton (DR)	Richard Winn (DR)	Isaac Motte Dart	John Julius Pringle	Paul Hamilton (DR)	Laurence Manning	DR maj.	DR maj.	Charles Pinckney (DR)	Jacob Read (F)	5F, 1DR	Jefferson (DR) ✗
1801	John Drayton (DR)	Richard Winn (DR)	Isaac Motte Dart	John Julius Pringle	Paul Hamilton (DR)	Laurence Manning	DR maj.	DR maj.	Charles Pinckney (DR)	John E. Colhoun (DR)	3DR, 3F	Jefferson (DR) ✓
1802	James Burchill Richardson (DR)	Ezekiel Pickens (DR)	Isaac Motte Dart	John Julius Pringle	Paul Hamilton (DR)	Laurence Manning	DR maj.	DR maj.	Thomas Sumter (DR)	John E. Colhoun (DR)	3DR, 3F	Jefferson (DR) ✓
1803	James Burchill Richardson (DR)	Ezekiel Pickens (DR)	Daniel Elliott Huger	John Julius Pringle	Paul Hamilton (DR)	Laurence Manning	DR maj.	DR maj.	Thomas Sumter (DR)	Pierce Butler (DR)	6DR, 2F	Jefferson (DR) ✓
1804	Paul Hamilton (DR)	Thomas Sumter Jr. (DR)	Daniel Elliott Huger	John Julius Pringle	Thomas Lee (DR)	Laurence Manning	DR maj.	DR maj.	Thomas Sumter (DR)	Pierce Butler (DR)	6DR, 2F	Jefferson (DR) ✓
1805	Paul Hamilton (DR)	Thomas Sumter Jr. (DR)	Daniel Elliott Huger	John Julius Pringle	Thomas Lee (DR)	John Baylis Earle	DR maj.	DR maj.	Thomas Sumter (DR)	John Gaillard (DR)	8DR	Jefferson/ Clinton (DR) ✓
1806	Charles Pinckney (DR)	John Hopkins (DR)	Daniel Elliott Huger	John Julius Pringle	Thomas Lee (DR)	John Baylis Earle	DR maj.	DR maj.	Thomas Sumter (DR)	John Gaillard (DR)	8DR	Jefferson/ Clinton (DR) ✓
1807	Charles Pinckney (DR)	John Hopkins (DR)	Stephen Lee Jr.	John Julius Pringle	Thomas Lee (DR)	John Baylis Earle	DR maj.	DR maj.	Thomas Sumter (DR)	John Gaillard (DR)	8DR	Jefferson/ Clinton (DR) ✓
1808	John Drayton (DR)	Frederick Nance (DR)	Stephen Lee Jr.	Langdon Cheves (DR)	Thomas Lee (DR)	John Baylis Earle	DR maj.	DR maj.	Thomas Sumter (DR)	John Gaillard (DR)	8DR	Jefferson/ Clinton (DR) ✓
1809	John Drayton (DR)	Frederick Nance (DR)	Stephen Lee Jr.	Langdon Cheves (DR)	Thomas Lee (DR)	John Baylis Earle	DR maj.	DR maj.	Thomas Sumter (DR)	John Gaillard (DR)	8DR	Madison/ Clinton (DR) ✓
1810	Henry Middleton (DR)	Samuel Farrow (DR)	Stephen Lee Jr.	John Smythe Richardson Sr.	Thomas Lee (DR)	John Baylis Earle	DR maj.	DR maj.	Thomas Sumter (DR)	John Gaillard (DR)	8DR	Madison/ Clinton (DR) ✓
1811	Henry Middleton (DR)	Samuel Farrow (DR)	Daniel James Ravenel	John Smythe Richardson Sr.	Thomas Lee (DR)	John Baylis Earle	DR maj.	DR maj.	John Taylor (DR)	John Gaillard (DR)	8DR	Madison/ Clinton (DR) ✓
1812	Joseph Alston (DR)	Eldred Simkins (DR)	Daniel James Ravenel	John Smythe Richardson Sr.	Thomas Lee (DR)	John Baylis Earle	DR maj.	DR maj.	John Taylor (DR)	John Gaillard (DR)	8DR	Madison/ Clinton (DR) ✓
1813	Joseph Alston (DR)	Eldred Simkins (DR)	Daniel James Ravenel	John Smythe Richardson Sr.	Thomas Lee (DR)	John Baylis Earle	DR maj.	DR maj.	John Taylor (DR)	John Gaillard (DR)	9DR	Madison/ Gerry (DR) ✓
1814	David Rogerson Williams (DR)	Robert Creswell (DR)	Daniel James Ravenel	John Smythe Richardson Sr.	Thomas Lee (DR)	John Baylis Earle	DR maj.	DR maj.	John Taylor (DR)	John Gaillard (DR)	9DR	Madison/ Gerry (DR) ✓
1815	David Rogerson Williams (DR)	Robert Creswell (DR)	John G. Brown	John Smythe Richardson Sr.	Thomas Lee (DR)	John Baylis Earle	DR maj.	DR maj.	John Taylor (DR)	John Gaillard (DR)	8DR, 1F	Madison/ Gerry (DR) ✓
1816	Andrew Pickens (DR)	John Alfred Cuthbert (DR)	John G. Brown	John Smythe Richardson Sr.	Thomas Lee (DR)	John Baylis Earle	DR maj.	DR maj.	John Taylor (DR)	John Gaillard (DR)	8DR, 1F	Madison/ Gerry (DR) ✓
1817	Andrew Pickens (DR)	John Alfred Cuthbert (DR)	John G. Brown	John Smythe Richardson Sr.	George Warren Cross (DR)	John Baylis Earle	DR maj.	DR maj.	William Smith (DR)	John Gaillard (DR)	9DR	Monroe/ Tompkins (DR) ✓
1818	John Geddes (DR)	William Youngblood (DR)	John G. Brown	Robert Y. Hayne (DR)	Robert Creswell (DR)	John Baylis Earle	DR maj.	DR maj.	William Smith (DR)	John Gaillard (DR)	9DR	Monroe/ Tompkins (DR) ✓
1819	John Geddes (DR)	William Youngblood (DR)	Beaufort Taylor Watts	Robert Y. Hayne (DR)	John S. Cogdell (DR)	John Baylis Earle	DR maj.	DR maj.	William Smith (DR)	John Gaillard (DR)	9DR	Monroe/ Tompkins (DR) ✓
1820	Thomas Bennett Jr. (DR)	William Pinckney (DR)	Beaufort Taylor Watts	Robert Y. Hayne (DR)	John S. Cogdell (DR)	John Baylis Earle	DR maj.	DR maj.	William Smith (DR)	John Gaillard (DR)	9DR	Monroe/ Tompkins (DR) ✓
1821	Thomas Bennett Jr. (DR)	William Pinckney (DR)	Beaufort Taylor Watts	Robert Y. Hayne (DR)	Thomas Lee (DR)	John Baylis Earle	DR maj.	DR maj.	William Smith (DR)	John Gaillard (DR)	9DR	Monroe/ Tompkins (DR) ✓
1822	John Lyde Wilson (DR)	Henry Bradley (DR)	Beaufort Taylor Watts	James L. Petigru (DR)	Benjamin T. Elmore (DR)	John Baylis Earle	DR maj.	DR maj.	William Smith (DR)	John Gaillard (DR)	9DR	Monroe/ Tompkins (DR) ✓
1823	John Lyde Wilson (DR)	Henry Bradley (DR)	William Laval	James L. Petigru (DR)	Benjamin T. Elmore (DR)	John Baylis Earle	DR maj.	DR maj.	Robert Y. Hayne (DR)	John Gaillard (DR)	9DR	Monroe/ Tompkins (DR) ✓
1824	Richard Irvine Manning I (DR)	William A. Bull (DR)	William Laval	James L. Petigru (DR)	Benjamin T. Elmore (DR)	John Baylis Earle	DR maj.	DR maj.	Robert Y. Hayne (DR)	John Gaillard (DR)	9DR	Monroe/ Tompkins (DR) ✓
1825	Richard Irvine Manning I (DR)	William A. Bull (DR)	William Laval	James L. Petigru (DR)	Benjamin T. Elmore (DR)	John Baylis Earle	DR maj.	DR maj.	Robert Y. Hayne (J)	John Gaillard (J)	9J	Jackson/ Calhoun (DR) ✗
1826	John Taylor (DR)	James Witherspoon Sr. (DR)	William Laval	James L. Petigru (DR)	Alexander Speer (DR)	John Baylis Earle	DR maj.	DR maj.	Robert Y. Hayne (J)	William Harper (J)	9J	Jackson/ Calhoun (DR) ✗
1827	John Taylor (DR)	James Witherspoon Sr. (DR)	Robert Starke	James L. Petigru (DR)	Alexander Speer (DR)	John Baylis Earle	DR maj.	DR maj.	Robert Y. Hayne (J)	William Smith (J)	9J	Jackson/ Calhoun (DR) ✗
1828	Stephen Decatur Miller (N)	Thomas Williams (N)	Robert Starke	James L. Petigru (NR)	Alexander Speer (DR)	John Baylis Earle	N maj.	N maj.	Robert Y. Hayne (J)	William Smith (J)	9J	Jackson/ Calhoun (DR) ✗
1829	Stephen Decatur Miller (N)	Thomas Williams (N)	Robert Starke	James L. Petigru (NR)	Alexander Speer (DR)	John Baylis Earle	N maj.	N maj.	Robert Y. Hayne (J)	William Smith (J)	9J	Jackson/ Calhoun (D) ✓
1830	James Hamilton Jr. (N)	Patrick Noble (N)	Henry Pendleton Taylor	Hugh S. Legaré (D)	Thomas Harrison (N)	John Baylis Earle	N maj.	N maj.	Robert Y. Hayne (J)	William Smith (J)	9J	Jackson/ Calhoun (D) ✓
1831	James Hamilton Jr. (N)	Patrick Noble (N)	Samuel Hammond (D)	Hugh S. Legaré (D)	Thomas Harrison (N)	John Baylis Earle	N maj.	N maj.	Robert Y. Hayne (N)	Stephen Decatur Miller (N)	6J, 3N	Jackson/ Calhoun (D) ✓
1832	Robert Y. Hayne (N)	Charles C. Pinckney II (N)	Samuel Hammond (D)	Robert Barnwell Rhett (N)	Thomas Harrison (N)	John Baylis Earle	N maj.	N maj.	Robert Y. Hayne (N)	Stephen Decatur Miller (N)	6J, 3N	Jackson/ Calhoun (D) ✓
1833	Robert Y. Hayne (N)	Charles C. Pinckney II (N)	Samuel Hammond (D)	Robert Barnwell Rhett (N)	Thomas Harrison (N)	John Baylis Earle	N maj.	N maj.	John C. Calhoun (N)	vacant	7N, 2J	Floyd/ Lee (DN) ✗
1834	George McDuffie (N)	Whitemarsh Benjamin Seabrook (D)	Samuel Hammond (D)	Robert Barnwell Rhett (N)	William Laval (D)	John Baylis Earle	D maj.	D maj.	John C. Calhoun (N)	William C. Preston (N)	8N, 1J	Floyd/ Lee (DN) ✗
1835	George McDuffie (N)	Whitemarsh Benjamin Seabrook (D)	Samuel Hammond (D)	Robert Barnwell Rhett (N)	William Laval (D)	John Baylis Earle	D maj.	D maj.	John C. Calhoun (N)	William C. Preston (N)	6N, 2J, 1NR	Floyd/ Lee (DN) ✗
1836	Pierce Mason Butler (D)	William Porcher DuBose (D)	Benjamin H. Saxon	Henry Bailey	William Laval (D)	James Jones	D maj.	D maj.	John C. Calhoun (N)	William C. Preston (N)	6N, 2J, 1NR	Floyd/ Lee (DN) ✗
1837	Pierce Mason Butler (D)	William Porcher DuBose (D)	Benjamin H. Saxon	Henry Bailey	William Laval (D)	James Jones	D maj.	D maj.	John C. Calhoun (D)	William C. Preston (W)	5N, 3D, 1W	Mangum/ Tyler (W) ✗
1838	Patrick Noble (D)	Barnabas Kelet Henagan (D)	Benjamin H. Saxon	Henry Bailey	William Edward Hayne (D)	James Jones	D maj.	D maj.	John C. Calhoun (D)	William C. Preston (W)	5N, 3D, 1W	Mangum/ Tyler (W) ✗
1839	Patrick Noble (D)	Barnabas Kelet Henagan (D)	Maximillan LaBorde	Henry Bailey	William Edward Hayne (D)	James Jones	D maj.	D maj.	John C. Calhoun (D)	William C. Preston (W)	8D, 1W	Mangum/ Tyler (W) ✗
1840	Barnabas Kelet Henagan (D) (Note: Assumed office following death or resignation of predecessor.)	vacant	Maximillan LaBorde	Henry Bailey	William Edward Hayne (D)	James Jones	D maj.	D maj.	John C. Calhoun (D)	William C. Preston (W)	8D, 1W	Mangum/ Tyler (W) ✗
1841	John Peter Richardson II (D)	W. K. Clowney (D)	Maximillan LaBorde	Henry Bailey	William Edward Hayne (D)	James Willis Cantey	D maj.	D maj.	John C. Calhoun (D)	William C. Preston (W)	8D, 1W	Van Buren (D) ✗
1842	James H. Hammond (D)	Isaac Donnom Witherspoon (D)	Maximillan LaBorde	Henry Bailey	William Laval (D)	James Willis Cantey	D maj.	D maj.	John C. Calhoun (D)	William C. Preston (W)	8D, 1W	Van Buren (D) ✗
1843	James H. Hammond (D)	Isaac Donnom Witherspoon (D)	Robert Quash Pinckney	Henry Bailey	William Laval (D)	James Willis Cantey	D maj.	D maj.	Daniel Elliott Huger (D)	George McDuffie (D)	7D	Van Buren (D) ✗
1844	William Aiken Jr. (D)	John Fulton Ervin (D)	Robert Quash Pinckney	Henry Bailey	William Laval (D)	James Willis Cantey	D maj.	D maj.	Daniel Elliott Huger (D)	George McDuffie (D)	7D	Van Buren (D) ✗
1845	William Aiken Jr. (D)	John Fulton Ervin (D)	Robert Quash Pinckney	Henry Bailey	William Laval (D)	James Willis Cantey	D maj.	D maj.	John C. Calhoun (D)	George McDuffie (D)	7D	Polk/ Dallas (D) ✓
1846	David Johnson (D)	William Cain (D)	Robert Quash Pinckney	Henry Bailey	William C. Black (D)	James Willis Cantey	D maj.	D maj.	John C. Calhoun (D)	George McDuffie (D)	7D	Polk/ Dallas (D) ✓
1847	David Johnson (D)	William Cain (D)	Barnabas Kelet Henagan (D)	Henry Bailey	William C. Black (D)	James Willis Cantey	D maj.	D maj.	John C. Calhoun (D)	Andrew Butler (D)	7D	Polk/ Dallas (D) ✓
1848	Whitemarsh Benjamin Seabrook (D)	William Henry Gist (D)	Barnabas Kelet Henagan (D)	Isaac W. Hayne	William C. Black (D)	James Willis Cantey	D maj.	D maj.	John C. Calhoun (D)	Andrew Butler (D)	7D	Polk/ Dallas (D) ✓
1849	Whitemarsh Benjamin Seabrook (D)	William Henry Gist (D)	Barnabas Kelet Henagan (D)	Isaac W. Hayne	William C. Black (D)	James Willis Cantey	D maj.	D maj.	John C. Calhoun (D)	Andrew Butler (D)	7D	Cass/ Butler (D) ✗
1850	John Hugh Means (D)	Joshua John Ward (D)	Barnabas Kelet Henagan (D)	Isaac W. Hayne	James B. McCully (D)	James Willis Cantey	D maj.	D maj.	Franklin H. Elmore (D)	Andrew Butler (D)	7D	Cass/ Butler (D) ✗
1850	John Hugh Means (D)	Joshua John Ward (D)	Barnabas Kelet Henagan (D)	Isaac W. Hayne	James B. McCully (D)	James Willis Cantey	D maj.	D maj.	Robert Woodward Barnwell (D)	Andrew Butler (D)	7D	Cass/ Butler (D) ✗
1851	John Hugh Means (D)	Joshua John Ward (D)	Benjamin Perry	Isaac W. Hayne	James B. McCully (D)	James Willis Cantey	D maj.	D maj.	Robert Barnwell Rhett (D)	Andrew Butler (D)	7D	Cass/ Butler (D) ✗
1852	John Lawrence Manning (D)	James Irby (D)	Benjamin Perry	Isaac W. Hayne	James B. McCully (D)	James Willis Cantey	D maj.	D maj.	William F. De Saussure (D)	Andrew Butler (D)	7D	Cass/ Butler (D) ✗
1853	John Lawrence Manning (D)	James Irby (D)	Benjamin Perry	Isaac W. Hayne	James B. McCully (D)	James Willis Cantey	D maj.	D maj.	Josiah J. Evans (D)	Andrew Butler (D)	6D	Pierce/ King (D) ✓
1854	James Hopkins Adams (D)	Richard de Treville (D)	Benjamin Perry	Isaac W. Hayne	John D. Ashmore (D)	Richard Gill Mills Dunovant	D maj.	D maj.	Josiah J. Evans (D)	Andrew Butler (D)	6D	Pierce/ King (D) ✓
1855	James Hopkins Adams (D)	Richard de Treville (D)	James Patterson	Isaac W. Hayne	John D. Ashmore (D)	Richard Gill Mills Dunovant	D maj.	D maj.	Josiah J. Evans (D)	Andrew Butler (D)	6D	Pierce/ King (D) ✓
1856	Robert F. W. Allston (D)	Gabriel Cannon (D)	James Patterson	Isaac W. Hayne	John D. Ashmore (D)	Richard Gill Mills Dunovant	D maj.	D maj.	Josiah J. Evans (D)	Andrew Butler (D)	6D	Pierce/ King (D) ✓
1857	Robert F. W. Allston (D)	Gabriel Cannon (D)	James Patterson	Isaac W. Hayne	John D. Ashmore (D)	Richard Gill Mills Dunovant	D maj.	D maj.	Josiah J. Evans (D)	vacant	6D	Buchanan/ Breckinridge (D) ✓
1858	William Henry Gist (D)	M. E. Carn (D)	James Patterson	Isaac W. Hayne	Thomas J. Pickens (D)	Richard Gill Mills Dunovant	D maj.	D maj.	Arthur P. Hayne (D)	James H. Hammond (D)	6D	Buchanan/ Breckinridge (D) ✓
1859	William Henry Gist (D)	M. E. Carn (D)	Isaac Hayne Means	Isaac W. Hayne	Thomas J. Pickens (D)	Richard Gill Mills Dunovant	D maj.	D maj.	James Chesnut Jr. (D)	James H. Hammond (D)	6D	Buchanan/ Breckinridge (D) ✓
1860	Francis Wilkinson Pickens (D)	W. W. Harllee (D)	Isaac Hayne Means	Isaac W. Hayne	Thomas J. Pickens (D)	Richard Gill Mills Dunovant	D maj.	D maj.	James Chesnut Jr. (D)	James H. Hammond (D)	6D	Buchanan/ Breckinridge (D) ✓
1861	Francis Wilkinson Pickens (D)	W. W. Harllee (D)	Isaac Hayne Means	Isaac W. Hayne	Thomas J. Pickens (D)	States Rights Gist (D)	D maj.	D maj.	vacant during American Civil War			Breckinridge/ Lane (SD) ✗
1862	Milledge Luke Bonham (D)	Plowden Weston (D)	Isaac Hayne Means	Isaac W. Hayne	James A. Black (D)	Wilmot Gibbes De Saussure	D maj.	D maj.	vacant during American Civil War			Breckinridge/ Lane (SD) ✗
1863	Milledge Luke Bonham (D)	Plowden Weston (D)	W. R. Huntt	Isaac W. Hayne	James A. Black (D)	Albert Creswell Garlington	D maj.	D maj.	vacant during American Civil War			Breckinridge/ Lane (SD) ✗
1864	Andrew Gordon Magrath (D) (Note: Deposed by the Union Army.)	Robert McCaw (D)	W. R. Huntt	Isaac W. Hayne	James A. Black (D)	Albert Creswell Garlington	D maj.	D maj.	vacant during American Civil War			Breckinridge/ Lane (SD) ✗

== 1865–2019 ==
Year	Executive offices									State Legislature		United States Congress			Electoral votes
Year	Governor	Lt. Governor	Sec. of State	Atty. Gen.	Treasurer	Comptroller	Supt. of Ed.	Adj. Gen.	Comm. of Ag.	State Senate	State House	U.S. Senator (Class II)	U.S. Senator (Class III)	U.S. House	Electoral votes
1865	Benjamin Franklin Perry (UD) (Note: Appointed by President Andrew Johnson.)	vacant	W. R. Huntt	Isaac W. Hayne	William Hood	James A. Black (D)	no such office	Albert Creswell Garlington	no such office (Note: The Department of Agriculture was established in 1879.)	31NP	124NP	vacant during Reconstruction			ineligible to participate
1866	James Lawrence Orr (NP) (Note: First popularly-elected Governor.)	William Dennison Porter (NP)	W. R. Huntt	Isaac W. Hayne	William Hood	Simon L. Leaphart (NP)	no such office	Albert Creswell Garlington	no such office	31NP	124NP	vacant during Reconstruction			ineligible to participate
1867	James Lawrence Orr (NP)	William Dennison Porter (NP)	Ellison Capers (D)	Isaac W. Hayne	Simon L. Leaphart (NP)	Simon L. Leaphart (NP)	no such office	Albert Creswell Garlington	no such office	31NP	124NP	vacant during Reconstruction			ineligible to participate
1868	Robert Kingston Scott (R)	Lemuel Boozer (R)	Francis Lewis Cardozo (R)	Daniel Henry Chamberlain (R)	Niles G. Parker (R)	John L. Neagle (R)	Justus K. Jillson (R)	Albert Creswell Garlington	no such office	31NP	124NP	Thomas J. Robertson (R)	Frederick A. Sawyer (R)	4R	ineligible to participate
1869	Robert Kingston Scott (R)	Lemuel Boozer (R)	Francis Lewis Cardozo (R)	Daniel Henry Chamberlain (R)	Niles G. Parker (R)	John L. Neagle (R)	Justus K. Jillson (R)	Franklin J. Moses Jr. (R)	no such office	25R, 6D	110R, 14D	Thomas J. Robertson (R)	Frederick A. Sawyer (R)	4R	Grant/ Colfax (R) ✓
1870	Robert Kingston Scott (R)	Alonzo J. Ransier (R)	Francis Lewis Cardozo (R)	Daniel Henry Chamberlain (R)	Niles G. Parker (R)	John L. Neagle (R)	Justus K. Jillson (R)	Franklin J. Moses Jr. (R)	no such office	25R, 6D	110R, 14D	Thomas J. Robertson (R)	Frederick A. Sawyer (R)	4R	Grant/ Colfax (R) ✓
1871	Robert Kingston Scott (R)	Alonzo J. Ransier (R)	Francis Lewis Cardozo (R)	Daniel Henry Chamberlain (R)	Niles G. Parker (R)	John L. Neagle (R)	Justus K. Jillson (R)	Franklin J. Moses Jr. (R)	no such office	26R, 5D	100R, 21UR, 3I	Thomas J. Robertson (R)	Frederick A. Sawyer (R)	4R	Grant/ Colfax (R) ✓
1872	Franklin J. Moses Jr. (R)	Richard Howell Gleaves (R)	Henry E. Hayne (R)	Samuel Wickliff Melton	Francis Lewis Cardozo (R)	Solomon L. Hoge (R)	Justus K. Jillson (R)	Henry William Purvis	no such office	26R, 5D	100R, 21UR, 3I	Thomas J. Robertson (R)	Frederick A. Sawyer (R)	4R	Grant/ Colfax (R) ✓
1873	Franklin J. Moses Jr. (R)	Richard Howell Gleaves (R)	Henry E. Hayne (R)	Samuel Wickliff Melton	Francis Lewis Cardozo (R)	Solomon L. Hoge (R)	Justus K. Jillson (R)	Henry William Purvis	no such office	25R, 8D	101R, 23D	Thomas J. Robertson (R)	John J. Patterson (R)	5R	Grant/ Wilson (R) ✓
1874	Daniel Henry Chamberlain (R) (Note: Claimed governorship following 1876 election.)	Richard Howell Gleaves (R)	Henry E. Hayne (R)	Samuel Wickliff Melton	Francis Lewis Cardozo (R)	Thomas C. Dunn (R)	Justus K. Jillson (R)	Henry William Purvis	no such office	25R, 8D	101R, 23D	Thomas J. Robertson (R)	John J. Patterson (R)	5R	Grant/ Wilson (R) ✓
1875	Daniel Henry Chamberlain (R)	Richard Howell Gleaves (R)	Henry E. Hayne (R)	Samuel Wickliff Melton	Francis Lewis Cardozo (R)	Thomas C. Dunn (R)	Justus K. Jillson (R)	Henry William Purvis	no such office	26R, 7C	91R, 33C	Thomas J. Robertson (R)	John J. Patterson (R)	5R	Grant/ Wilson (R) ✓
1876	Wade Hampton III (D)	William Dunlap Simpson (D)	Robert Moorman Sims (D)	William Stone (R)	Francis Lewis Cardozo (R)	Johnson Hagood (D)	John R. Tolbert (R)	Edwin Warren Moïse (D)	no such office	26R, 7C	91R, 33C	Thomas J. Robertson (R)	John J. Patterson (R)	5R	Grant/ Wilson (R) ✓
1877	Wade Hampton III (D)	William Dunlap Simpson (D)	Robert Moorman Sims (D)	Robert B. Elliott (R)	Simon L. Leaphart (D)	Johnson Hagood (D)	Hugh Smith Thompson (D)	Edwin Warren Moïse (D)	no such office	18R, 15D	65D, 59R	Matthew Butler (D)	John J. Patterson (R)	3R, 2D	Hayes/ Wheeler (R) ✓
1878	Wade Hampton III (D)	William Dunlap Simpson (D)	Robert Moorman Sims (D)	LeRoy Franklin Youmans (D)	Simon L. Leaphart (D)	Johnson Hagood (D)	Hugh Smith Thompson (D)	Edwin Warren Moïse (D)	no such office	18R, 15D	65D, 59R	Matthew Butler (D)	John J. Patterson (R)	3R, 2D	Hayes/ Wheeler (R) ✓
1879	William Dunlap Simpson (D)	vacant	Robert Moorman Sims (D)	LeRoy Franklin Youmans (D)	Simon L. Leaphart (D)	Johnson Hagood (D)	Hugh Smith Thompson (D)	Edwin Warren Moïse (D)	no such office	28D, 5R	121D, 3R	Matthew Butler (D)	Wade Hampton III (D)	5D	Hayes/ Wheeler (R) ✓
1880	Thomas Bothwell Jeter (D)	vacant	Robert Moorman Sims (D)	LeRoy Franklin Youmans (D)	Simon L. Leaphart (D)	John C. Coit	Hugh Smith Thompson (D)	John Scoffing	A. P. Butler (D)	28D, 5R	121D, 3R	Matthew Butler (D)	Wade Hampton III (D)	5D	Hayes/ Wheeler (R) ✓
1881	Johnson Hagood (D)	John Doby Kennedy (D)	Robert Moorman Sims (D)	LeRoy Franklin Youmans (D)	J. P. Richardson (D)	John Bratton (D)	Hugh Smith Thompson (D)	Arthur Middleton Manigault	A. P. Butler (D)	33D, 2R	120D, 4R	Matthew Butler (D)	Wade Hampton III (D)	5D	Hancock/ English (D) ✗
1882	Hugh Smith Thompson (D)	John Calhoun Sheppard (D)	James Nathan Lipscomb (D)	Charles R. Miles	J. P. Richardson (D)	William E. Stoney (D)	Asbury Coward (D)	Arthur Middleton Manigault	A. P. Butler (D)	33D, 2R	120D, 4R	Matthew Butler (D)	Wade Hampton III (D)	3D, 2R	Hancock/ English (D) ✗
1883	Hugh Smith Thompson (D)	John Calhoun Sheppard (D)	James Nathan Lipscomb (D)	Charles R. Miles	J. P. Richardson (D)	William E. Stoney (D)	Asbury Coward (D)	Arthur Middleton Manigault	A. P. Butler (D)	33D, 2R	118D, 6R	Matthew Butler (D)	Wade Hampton III (D)	6D, 1R	Hancock/ English (D) ✗
1884	Hugh Smith Thompson (D)	John Calhoun Sheppard (D)	James Nathan Lipscomb (D)	Charles R. Miles	J. P. Richardson (D)	William E. Stoney (D)	Asbury Coward (D)	Arthur Middleton Manigault	A. P. Butler (D)	33D, 2R	118D, 6R	Matthew Butler (D)	Wade Hampton III (D)	6D, 1R	Hancock/ English (D) ✗
1885	Hugh Smith Thompson (D)	John Calhoun Sheppard (D)	James Nathan Lipscomb (D)	Charles R. Miles	J. P. Richardson (D)	William E. Stoney (D)	Asbury Coward (D)	Milledge Lipscomb Bonham Jr.	A. P. Butler (D)	32D, 3R	119D, 5R	Matthew Butler (D)	Wade Hampton III (D)	6D, 1R	Cleveland/ Hendricks (D) ✓
1886	John Calhoun Sheppard (D)	vacant	William Zachariah Leitner (D)	Joseph H. Earle (D)	J. P. Richardson (D)	John S. Verner (D)	James H. Rice (D)	Milledge Lipscomb Bonham Jr.	A. P. Butler (D)	32D, 3R	119D, 5R	Matthew Butler (D)	Wade Hampton III (D)	6D, 1R	Cleveland/ Hendricks (D) ✓
1887	John Peter Richardson III (D)	William Mauldin (D)	William Zachariah Leitner (D)	Joseph H. Earle (D)	I. S. Bamberg (D)	John S. Verner (D)	James H. Rice (D)	Milledge Lipscomb Bonham Jr.	A. P. Butler (D)	33D, 2R	120D, 4R	Matthew Butler (D)	Wade Hampton III (D)	7D	Cleveland/ Hendricks (D) ✓
1888	John Peter Richardson III (D)	William Mauldin (D)	John Quitman Marshall (D)	Joseph H. Earle (D)	I. S. Bamberg (D)	John S. Verner (D)	James H. Rice (D)	Milledge Lipscomb Bonham Jr.	A. P. Butler (D)	33D, 2R	120D, 4R	Matthew Butler (D)	Wade Hampton III (D)	7D	Cleveland/ Hendricks (D) ✓
1889	John Peter Richardson III (D)	William Mauldin (D)	John Quitman Marshall (D)	Joseph H. Earle (D)	E. R. McIver (D)	John S. Verner (D)	James H. Rice (D)	Milledge Lipscomb Bonham Jr.	A. P. Butler (D)	35D	121D, 3R	Matthew Butler (D)	Wade Hampton III (D)	6D, 1R	Cleveland/ Thurman (D) ✗
1890	Benjamin Tillman (D)	Eugene B. Gary (D)	James E. Tindal (D)	Young J. Pope	E. R. McIver (D)	William Haselden Ellerbe (D)	W. D. Mayfield (D)	Hugh L. Farley	A. P. Butler (D)	35D	121D, 3R	Matthew Butler (D)	Wade Hampton III (D)	6D, 1R	Cleveland/ Thurman (D) ✗
1891	Benjamin Tillman (D)	Eugene B. Gary (D)	James E. Tindal (D)	John L. McLaurin (D)	W. T. C. Bates (D)	William Haselden Ellerbe (D)	W. D. Mayfield (D)	Hugh L. Farley	Mr. Moore (D)	32D, 3R	115D, 9R	Matthew Butler (D)	John L. M. Irby (D)	7D	Cleveland/ Thurman (D) ✗
1892	Benjamin Tillman (D)	Eugene B. Gary (D)	James E. Tindal (D)	Daniel A. Townshend	W. T. C. Bates (D)	William Haselden Ellerbe (D)	W. D. Mayfield (D)	Hugh L. Farley	no such office (Note: Responsibilities originally housed at the Department of Agriculture were transferred to other state agencies from 1891 to 1904.)	32D, 3R	115D, 9R	Matthew Butler (D)	John L. M. Irby (D)	7D	Cleveland/ Thurman (D) ✗
1893	Benjamin Tillman (D)	Washington H. Timmerman (D)	James E. Tindal (D)	Daniel A. Townshend	W. T. C. Bates (D)	William Haselden Ellerbe (D)	W. D. Mayfield (D)	Hugh L. Farley	no such office	36D	120D, 4R	Matthew Butler (D)	John L. M. Irby (D)	6D, 1R	Cleveland/ Stevenson (D) ✓
1894	John Gary Evans (D)	Washington H. Timmerman (D)	Daniel Hollard Tompkins (D)	William A. Barber	W. T. C. Bates (D)	James W. Norton (D)	W. D. Mayfield (D)	Hugh L. Farley	no such office	36D	120D, 4R	Matthew Butler (D)	John L. M. Irby (D)	6D, 1R	Cleveland/ Stevenson (D) ✓
1895	John Gary Evans (D)	Washington H. Timmerman (D)	Daniel Hollard Tompkins (D)	William A. Barber	W. T. C. Bates (D)	James W. Norton (D)	W. D. Mayfield (D)	John Gary Watts	no such office	29D, 7ID	104D, 17ID, 3R	Benjamin Tillman (D)	John L. M. Irby (D)	7D	Cleveland/ Stevenson (D) ✓
1896	John Gary Evans (D)	Washington H. Timmerman (D)	Daniel Hollard Tompkins (D)	William A. Barber	W. T. C. Bates (D)	James W. Norton (D)	W. D. Mayfield (D)	John Gary Watts	no such office	29D, 7ID	104D, 17ID, 3R	Benjamin Tillman (D)	John L. M. Irby (D)	6D, 1R	Cleveland/ Stevenson (D) ✓
1897	William Haselden Ellerbe (D)	Miles Benjamin McSweeney (D)	Daniel Hollard Tompkins (D)	William A. Barber	W. H. Timmerman (D)	Lafayette P. Epton (D)	W. D. Mayfield (D)	John Gary Watts	no such office	36D	123D, 1R	Benjamin Tillman (D)	Joseph H. Earle (D)	7D	Bryan/ Sewall (D) ✗
1898	William Haselden Ellerbe (D)	Miles Benjamin McSweeney (D)	Daniel Hollard Tompkins (D)	G. Duncan Bellinger Sr.	W. H. Timmerman (D)	Lafayette P. Epton (D)	John J. McMahan (D)	John Gary Watts	no such office	36D	123D, 1R	Benjamin Tillman (D)	John L. McLaurin (D)	7D	Bryan/ Sewall (D) ✗
1899	Miles Benjamin McSweeney (D)	Robert B. Scarborough (D)	Marion Reed Cooper (D)	G. Duncan Bellinger Sr.	W. H. Timmerman (D)	John P. Derham (D)	John J. McMahan (D)	Joseph W. Floyd	no such office	41D	123D, 1R	Benjamin Tillman (D)	John L. McLaurin (D)	7D	Bryan/ Sewall (D) ✗
1900	Miles Benjamin McSweeney (D)	Robert B. Scarborough (D)	Marion Reed Cooper (D)	G. Duncan Bellinger Sr.	W. H. Timmerman (D)	John P. Derham (D)	John J. McMahan (D)	Joseph W. Floyd	no such office	41D	123D, 1R	Benjamin Tillman (D)	John L. McLaurin (D)	7D	Bryan/ Sewall (D) ✗
1901	Miles Benjamin McSweeney (D)	James H. Tillman (D)	Marion Reed Cooper (D)	G. Duncan Bellinger Sr.	R. H. Jennings (D)	John P. Derham (D)	John J. McMahan (D)	Joseph W. Floyd	no such office	41D	123D, 1R	Benjamin Tillman (D)	John L. McLaurin (D)	7D	Bryan/ Sewall (D) ✗
1902	Miles Benjamin McSweeney (D)	James H. Tillman (D)	Marion Reed Cooper (D)	U. X. Gunter Jr.	R. H. Jennings (D)	John P. Derham (D)	Oscar B. Martin (D)	Joseph W. Floyd	no such office	41D	123D, 1R	Benjamin Tillman (D)	John L. McLaurin (D)	7D	Bryan/ Sewall (D) ✗
1903	Duncan Clinch Heyward (D)	John Sloan (D)	J. T. Gantt (D)	U. X. Gunter Jr.	R. H. Jennings (D)	Adolphus W. Jones (D)	Oscar B. Martin (D)	John D. Frost	no such office	41D	124D	Benjamin Tillman (D)	Asbury Latimer (D)	7D	Bryan/ Sewall (D) ✗
1904	Duncan Clinch Heyward (D)	John Sloan (D)	J. T. Gantt (D)	U. X. Gunter Jr.	R. H. Jennings (D)	Adolphus W. Jones (D)	Oscar B. Martin (D)	John D. Frost	E. J. Watson (D)	41D	124D	Benjamin Tillman (D)	Asbury Latimer (D)	7D	Bryan/ Sewall (D) ✗
1905	Duncan Clinch Heyward (D)	John Sloan (D)	J. T. Gantt (D)	LeRoy Franklin Youmans (D)	R. H. Jennings (D)	Adolphus W. Jones (D)	Oscar B. Martin (D)	John D. Frost	E. J. Watson (D)	41D	124D	Benjamin Tillman (D)	Asbury Latimer (D)	7D	Parker/ Davis (D) ✗
1906	Duncan Clinch Heyward (D)	John Sloan (D)	J. T. Gantt (D)	D. C. Ray	R. H. Jennings (D)	Adolphus W. Jones (D)	Oscar B. Martin (D)	John D. Frost	E. J. Watson (D)	41D	124D	Benjamin Tillman (D)	Asbury Latimer (D)	7D	Parker/ Davis (D) ✗
1907	Martin Frederick Ansel (D)	Thomas Gordon McLeod (D)	R. M. McCown (D)	J. Fraser Lyon	R. H. Jennings (D)	Adolphus W. Jones (D)	Oscar B. Martin (D)	John C. Boyd	E. J. Watson (D)	41D	124D	Benjamin Tillman (D)	Asbury Latimer (D)	7D	Parker/ Davis (D) ✗
1908	Martin Frederick Ansel (D)	Thomas Gordon McLeod (D)	R. M. McCown (D)	J. Fraser Lyon	R. H. Jennings (D)	Adolphus W. Jones (D)	John E. Swearingen (D)	John C. Boyd	E. J. Watson (D)	41D	124D	Benjamin Tillman (D)	Frank B. Gary (D)	7D	Parker/ Davis (D) ✗
1909	Martin Frederick Ansel (D)	Thomas Gordon McLeod (D)	R. M. McCown (D)	J. Fraser Lyon	R. H. Jennings (D)	Adolphus W. Jones (D)	John E. Swearingen (D)	John C. Boyd	E. J. Watson (D)	41D	124D	Benjamin Tillman (D)	Ellison D. Smith (D)	7D	Bryan/ Kern (D) ✗
1910	Martin Frederick Ansel (D)	Thomas Gordon McLeod (D)	R. M. McCown (D)	J. Fraser Lyon	R. H. Jennings (D)	Adolphus W. Jones (D)	John E. Swearingen (D)	William W. Moore	E. J. Watson (D)	41D	124D	Benjamin Tillman (D)	Ellison D. Smith (D)	7D	Bryan/ Kern (D) ✗
1911	Cole L. Blease (D)	Charles Aurelius Smith (D)	R. M. McCown (D)	J. Fraser Lyon	R. H. Jennings (D)	Adolphus W. Jones (D)	John E. Swearingen (D)	William W. Moore	E. J. Watson (D)	44D	124D	Benjamin Tillman (D)	Ellison D. Smith (D)	7D	Bryan/ Kern (D) ✗
1912	Cole L. Blease (D)	Charles Aurelius Smith (D)	R. M. McCown (D)	J. Fraser Lyon	R. H. Jennings (D)	Adolphus W. Jones (D)	John E. Swearingen (D)	William W. Moore	E. J. Watson (D)	44D	124D	Benjamin Tillman (D)	Ellison D. Smith (D)	7D	Bryan/ Kern (D) ✗
1913	Cole L. Blease (D)	Charles Aurelius Smith (D)	R. M. McCown (D)	Thomas H. Peeples (D)	S. T. Carter (D)	Adolphus W. Jones (D)	John E. Swearingen (D)	William W. Moore	E. J. Watson (D)	44D	124D	Benjamin Tillman (D)	Ellison D. Smith (D)	7D	Wilson/ Marshall (D) ✓
1914	Cole L. Blease (D)	Charles Aurelius Smith (D)	R. M. McCown (D)	Thomas H. Peeples (D)	S. T. Carter (D)	Adolphus W. Jones (D)	John E. Swearingen (D)	William W. Moore	E. J. Watson (D)	44D	124D	Benjamin Tillman (D)	Ellison D. Smith (D)	7D	Wilson/ Marshall (D) ✓
1915	Charles Aurelius Smith (D)	vacant	R. M. McCown (D)	Thomas H. Peeples (D)	S. T. Carter (D)	Carlton W. Sawyer (D)	John E. Swearingen (D)	William W. Moore	E. J. Watson (D)	44D	124D	Benjamin Tillman (D)	Ellison D. Smith (D)	7D	Wilson/ Marshall (D) ✓
1916	Richard Irvine Manning III (D)	Andrew Bethea (D)	R. M. McCown (D)	Thomas H. Peeples (D)	S. T. Carter (D)	Carlton W. Sawyer (D)	John E. Swearingen (D)	William W. Moore	E. J. Watson (D)	44D	124D	Benjamin Tillman (D)	Ellison D. Smith (D)	7D	Wilson/ Marshall (D) ✓
1917	Richard Irvine Manning III (D)	Andrew Bethea (D)	W. Banks Dove (D)	Thomas H. Peeples (D)	S. T. Carter (D)	Carlton W. Sawyer (D)	John E. Swearingen (D)	William W. Moore	E. J. Watson (D)	44D	124D	Benjamin Tillman (D)	Ellison D. Smith (D)	7D	Wilson/ Marshall (D) ✓
1918	Richard Irvine Manning III (D)	Andrew Bethea (D)	W. Banks Dove (D)	Samuel Wolfe	S. T. Carter (D)	R. Lyles Osborne (D)	John E. Swearingen (D)	William W. Moore	A. C. Summers (D)	44D	124D	Christie Benet (D)	Ellison D. Smith (D)	7D	Wilson/ Marshall (D) ✓
1918	Richard Irvine Manning III (D)	Andrew Bethea (D)	W. Banks Dove (D)	Samuel Wolfe	S. T. Carter (D)	R. Lyles Osborne (D)	John E. Swearingen (D)	William W. Moore	A. C. Summers (D)	44D	124D	William P. Pollock (D)	Ellison D. Smith (D)	7D	Wilson/ Marshall (D) ✓
1919	Robert Archer Cooper (D)	J. T. Liles (D)	W. Banks Dove (D)	Samuel Wolfe	S. T. Carter (D)	R. Lyles Osborne (D)	John E. Swearingen (D)	William W. Moore	Bonneau Harris (D)	46D	124D	Nathaniel B. Dial (D)	Ellison D. Smith (D)	7D	Wilson/ Marshall (D) ✓
1920	Robert Archer Cooper (D)	J. T. Liles (D)	W. Banks Dove (D)	Samuel Wolfe	S. T. Carter (D)	Wilbert Sutherland (D)	John E. Swearingen (D)	William W. Moore	Bonneau Harris (D)	46D	124D	Nathaniel B. Dial (D)	Ellison D. Smith (D)	7D	Wilson/ Marshall (D) ✓
1921	Robert Archer Cooper (D)	Wilson Godfrey Harvey (D)	W. Banks Dove (D)	Samuel Wolfe	S. T. Carter (D)	Walter E. Duncan (D)	John E. Swearingen (D)	Rufus W. Grant	Bonneau Harris (D)	46D	124D	Nathaniel B. Dial (D)	Ellison D. Smith (D)	7D	Cox/ Roosevelt (D) ✗
1922	Wilson Godfrey Harvey (D)	vacant	W. Banks Dove (D)	Samuel Wolfe	S. T. Carter (D)	Walter E. Duncan (D)	James H. Hope (D)	Rufus W. Grant	Bonneau Harris (D)	46D	124D	Nathaniel B. Dial (D)	Ellison D. Smith (D)	7D	Cox/ Roosevelt (D) ✗
1923	Thomas Gordon McLeod (D)	E. B. Jackson (D)	W. Banks Dove (D)	Samuel Wolfe	S. T. Carter (D)	Walter E. Duncan (D)	James H. Hope (D)	Robert E. Craig	Bonneau Harris (D)	46D	124D	Nathaniel B. Dial (D)	Ellison D. Smith (D)	7D	Cox/ Roosevelt (D) ✗
1924	Thomas Gordon McLeod (D)	E. B. Jackson (D)	W. P. Blackwell (D)	John M. Daniel (D)	S. T. Carter (D)	Walter E. Duncan (D)	James H. Hope (D)	Robert E. Craig	Bonneau Harris (D)	46D	124D	Nathaniel B. Dial (D)	Ellison D. Smith (D)	7D	Cox/ Roosevelt (D) ✗
1925	Thomas Gordon McLeod (D)	E. B. Jackson (D)	W. P. Blackwell (D)	John M. Daniel (D)	S. T. Carter (D)	A. J. Beattie (D)	James H. Hope (D)	Robert E. Craig	Bonneau Harris (D)	46D	124D	Cole L. Blease (D)	Ellison D. Smith (D)	7D	Davis/ Bryan (D) ✗
1926	Thomas Gordon McLeod (D)	E. B. Jackson (D)	W. P. Blackwell (D)	John M. Daniel (D)	Julian Haskell Scarborough (D)	A. J. Beattie (D)	James H. Hope (D)	James C. Dozier	James W. Shealy (D)	46D	124D	Cole L. Blease (D)	Ellison D. Smith (D)	7D	Davis/ Bryan (D) ✗
1927	John Gardiner Richards Jr. (D)	Thomas Bothwell Butler (D)	W. P. Blackwell (D)	John M. Daniel (D)	Julian Haskell Scarborough (D)	A. J. Beattie (D)	James H. Hope (D)	James C. Dozier	James W. Shealy (D)	46D	124D	Cole L. Blease (D)	Ellison D. Smith (D)	7D	Davis/ Bryan (D) ✗
1928	John Gardiner Richards Jr. (D)	Thomas Bothwell Butler (D)	W. P. Blackwell (D)	John M. Daniel (D)	Julian Haskell Scarborough (D)	A. J. Beattie (D)	James H. Hope (D)	James C. Dozier	James W. Shealy (D)	46D	124D	Cole L. Blease (D)	Ellison D. Smith (D)	7D	Davis/ Bryan (D) ✗
1929	John Gardiner Richards Jr. (D)	Thomas Bothwell Butler (D)	W. P. Blackwell (D)	John M. Daniel (D)	Julian Haskell Scarborough (D)	A. J. Beattie (D)	James H. Hope (D)	James C. Dozier	James W. Shealy (D)	46D	124D	Cole L. Blease (D)	Ellison D. Smith (D)	7D	Smith/ Robinson (D) ✗
1930	John Gardiner Richards Jr. (D)	Thomas Bothwell Butler (D)	W. P. Blackwell (D)	John M. Daniel (D)	Julian Haskell Scarborough (D)	A. J. Beattie (D)	James H. Hope (D)	James C. Dozier	James W. Shealy (D)	46D	124D	Cole L. Blease (D)	Ellison D. Smith (D)	7D	Smith/ Robinson (D) ✗
1931	Ibra Charles Blackwood (D)	James Sheppard (D)	W. P. Blackwell (D)	John M. Daniel (D)	Julian Haskell Scarborough (D)	A. J. Beattie (D)	James H. Hope (D)	James C. Dozier	James W. Shealy (D)	46D	124D	James F. Byrnes (D)	Ellison D. Smith (D)	7D	Smith/ Robinson (D) ✗
1932	Ibra Charles Blackwood (D)	James Sheppard (D)	W. P. Blackwell (D)	John M. Daniel (D)	Julian Haskell Scarborough (D)	A. J. Beattie (D)	James H. Hope (D)	James C. Dozier	James W. Shealy (D)	46D	124D	James F. Byrnes (D)	Ellison D. Smith (D)	7D	Smith/ Robinson (D) ✗
1933	Ibra Charles Blackwood (D)	James Sheppard (D)	W. P. Blackwell (D)	John M. Daniel (D)	Julian Haskell Scarborough (D)	A. J. Beattie (D)	James H. Hope (D)	James C. Dozier	J. Roy Jones (D)	46D	124D	James F. Byrnes (D)	Ellison D. Smith (D)	6D	Roosevelt/ Garner (D) ✓
1934	Ibra Charles Blackwood (D)	James Sheppard (D)	W. P. Blackwell (D)	John M. Daniel (D)	E. P. Miller (D)	A. J. Beattie (D)	James H. Hope (D)	James C. Dozier	J. Roy Jones (D)	46D	124D	James F. Byrnes (D)	Ellison D. Smith (D)	6D	Roosevelt/ Garner (D) ✓
1935	Olin D. Johnston (D)	Joseph Emile Harley (D)	W. P. Blackwell (D)	John M. Daniel (D)	E. P. Miller (D)	A. J. Beattie (D)	James H. Hope (D)	James C. Dozier	J. Roy Jones (D)	46D	124D	James F. Byrnes (D)	Ellison D. Smith (D)	6D	Roosevelt/ Garner (D) ✓
1936	Olin D. Johnston (D)	Joseph Emile Harley (D)	W. P. Blackwell (D)	John M. Daniel (D)	E. P. Miller (D)	A. J. Beattie (D)	James H. Hope (D)	James C. Dozier	J. Roy Jones (D)	46D	124D	James F. Byrnes (D)	Ellison D. Smith (D)	6D	Roosevelt/ Garner (D) ✓
1937	Olin D. Johnston (D)	Joseph Emile Harley (D)	W. P. Blackwell (D)	John M. Daniel (D)	E. P. Miller (D)	A. J. Beattie (D)	James H. Hope (D)	James C. Dozier	J. Roy Jones (D)	46D	124D	James F. Byrnes (D)	Ellison D. Smith (D)	6D	Roosevelt/ Garner (D) ✓
1938	Olin D. Johnston (D)	Joseph Emile Harley (D)	W. P. Blackwell (D)	John M. Daniel (D)	E. P. Miller (D)	A. J. Beattie (D)	James H. Hope (D)	James C. Dozier	J. Roy Jones (D)	46D	124D	James F. Byrnes (D)	Ellison D. Smith (D)	6D	Roosevelt/ Garner (D) ✓
1939	Burnet R. Maybank (D)	Joseph Emile Harley (D)	W. P. Blackwell (D)	John M. Daniel (D)	E. P. Miller (D)	A. J. Beattie (D)	James H. Hope (D)	James C. Dozier	J. Roy Jones (D)	46D	124D	James F. Byrnes (D)	Ellison D. Smith (D)	6D	Roosevelt/ Garner (D) ✓
1940	Burnet R. Maybank (D)	Joseph Emile Harley (D)	W. P. Blackwell (D)	John M. Daniel (D)	Jeff B. Bates (D)	A. J. Beattie (D)	James H. Hope (D)	James C. Dozier	J. Roy Jones (D)	46D	124D	James F. Byrnes (D)	Ellison D. Smith (D)	6D	Roosevelt/ Garner (D) ✓
1941	Joseph Emile Harley (D)	vacant	W. P. Blackwell (D)	John M. Daniel (D)	Jeff B. Bates (D)	A. J. Beattie (D)	James H. Hope (D)	James C. Dozier	J. Roy Jones (D)	46D	124D	Alva M. Lumpkin (D)	Ellison D. Smith (D)	6D	Roosevelt/ Wallace (D) ✓
1941	Joseph Emile Harley (D)	vacant	W. P. Blackwell (D)	John M. Daniel (D)	Jeff B. Bates (D)	A. J. Beattie (D)	James H. Hope (D)	James C. Dozier	J. Roy Jones (D)	46D	124D	Roger C. Peace (D)	Ellison D. Smith (D)	6D	Roosevelt/ Wallace (D) ✓
1942	Richard Manning Jefferies (D)	vacant	W. P. Blackwell (D)	John M. Daniel (D)	Jeff B. Bates (D)	A. J. Beattie (D)	James H. Hope (D)	James C. Dozier	J. Roy Jones (D)	46D	124D	Burnet R. Maybank (D)	Ellison D. Smith (D)	6D	Roosevelt/ Wallace (D) ✓
1943	Olin D. Johnston (D)	Ransome Judson Williams (D)	W. P. Blackwell (D)	John M. Daniel (D)	Jeff B. Bates (D)	Elridge C. Rhodes (D)	James H. Hope (D)	James C. Dozier	J. Roy Jones (D)	46D	124D	Burnet R. Maybank (D)	Ellison D. Smith (D)	6D	Roosevelt/ Wallace (D) ✓
1944	Olin D. Johnston (D)	Ransome Judson Williams (D)	W. P. Blackwell (D)	John M. Daniel (D)	Jeff B. Bates (D)	Elridge C. Rhodes (D)	James H. Hope (D)	James C. Dozier	J. Roy Jones (D)	46D	124D	Burnet R. Maybank (D)	Wilton E. Hall (D)	6D	Roosevelt/ Wallace (D) ✓
1945	Ransome Judson Williams (D)	vacant	W. P. Blackwell (D)	John M. Daniel (D)	Jeff B. Bates (D)	Elridge C. Rhodes (D)	James H. Hope (D)	James C. Dozier	J. Roy Jones (D)	46D	124D	Burnet R. Maybank (D)	Olin D. Johnston (D)	6D	Roosevelt/ Truman (D) ✓
1946	Ransome Judson Williams (D)	vacant	W. P. Blackwell (D)	John M. Daniel (D)	Jeff B. Bates (D)	Elridge C. Rhodes (D)	James H. Hope (D)	James C. Dozier	J. Roy Jones (D)	46D	124D	Burnet R. Maybank (D)	Olin D. Johnston (D)	6D	Roosevelt/ Truman (D) ✓
1947	Strom Thurmond (D)	George Bell Timmerman Jr. (D)	W. P. Blackwell (D)	John M. Daniel (D)	Jeff B. Bates (D)	Elridge C. Rhodes (D)	Jesse T. Anderson (D)	James C. Dozier	J. Roy Jones (D)	46D	124D	Burnet R. Maybank (D)	Olin D. Johnston (D)	6D	Roosevelt/ Truman (D) ✓
1948	Strom Thurmond (D)	George Bell Timmerman Jr. (D)	W. P. Blackwell (D)	John M. Daniel (D)	Jeff B. Bates (D)	Elridge C. Rhodes (D)	Jesse T. Anderson (D)	James C. Dozier	J. Roy Jones (D)	46D	124D	Burnet R. Maybank (D)	Olin D. Johnston (D)	6D	Roosevelt/ Truman (D) ✓
1949	Strom Thurmond (D)	George Bell Timmerman Jr. (D)	W. P. Blackwell (D)	John M. Daniel (D)	Jeff B. Bates (D)	Elridge C. Rhodes (D)	Jesse T. Anderson (D)	James C. Dozier	J. Roy Jones (D)	46D	124D	Burnet R. Maybank (D)	Olin D. Johnston (D)	6D	Thurmond/ Wright (Dix) ✗
1950	Strom Thurmond (D)	George Bell Timmerman Jr. (D)	P. T. Bradham (D)	John M. Daniel (D)	Jeff B. Bates (D)	Elridge C. Rhodes (D)	Jesse T. Anderson (D)	James C. Dozier	J. Roy Jones (D)	46D	124D	Burnet R. Maybank (D)	Olin D. Johnston (D)	6D	Thurmond/ Wright (Dix) ✗
1951	James F. Byrnes (D)	George Bell Timmerman Jr. (D)	Oscar Frank Thornton (D)	T. C. Callison (D)	Jeff B. Bates (D)	Elridge C. Rhodes (D)	Jesse T. Anderson (D)	James C. Dozier	J. Roy Jones (D)	46D	124D	Burnet R. Maybank (D)	Olin D. Johnston (D)	6D	Thurmond/ Wright (Dix) ✗
1952	James F. Byrnes (D)	George Bell Timmerman Jr. (D)	Oscar Frank Thornton (D)	T. C. Callison (D)	Jeff B. Bates (D)	Elridge C. Rhodes (D)	Jesse T. Anderson (D)	James C. Dozier	J. Roy Jones (D)	46D	124D	Burnet R. Maybank (D)	Olin D. Johnston (D)	6D	Thurmond/ Wright (Dix) ✗
1953	James F. Byrnes (D)	George Bell Timmerman Jr. (D)	Oscar Frank Thornton (D)	T. C. Callison (D)	Jeff B. Bates (D)	Elridge C. Rhodes (D)	Jesse T. Anderson (D)	James C. Dozier	J. Roy Jones (D)	46D	124D	Burnet R. Maybank (D)	Olin D. Johnston (D)	6D	Stevenson/ Sparkman (D) ✗
1954	James F. Byrnes (D)	George Bell Timmerman Jr. (D)	Oscar Frank Thornton (D)	T. C. Callison (D)	Jeff B. Bates (D)	Elridge C. Rhodes (D)	Jesse T. Anderson (D)	James C. Dozier	J. Roy Jones (D)	46D	124D	Charles E. Daniel (D)	Olin D. Johnston (D)	6D	Stevenson/ Sparkman (D) ✗
1954	James F. Byrnes (D)	George Bell Timmerman Jr. (D)	Oscar Frank Thornton (D)	T. C. Callison (D)	Jeff B. Bates (D)	Elridge C. Rhodes (D)	Jesse T. Anderson (D)	James C. Dozier	J. Roy Jones (D)	46D	124D	Strom Thurmond (D)	Olin D. Johnston (D)	6D	Stevenson/ Sparkman (D) ✗
1955	George Bell Timmerman Jr. (D)	Fritz Hollings (D)	Oscar Frank Thornton (D)	T. C. Callison (D)	Jeff B. Bates (D)	Elridge C. Rhodes (D)	Jesse T. Anderson (D)	James C. Dozier	J. Roy Jones (D)	46D	124D	Strom Thurmond (D)	Olin D. Johnston (D)	6D	Stevenson/ Sparkman (D) ✗
1956	George Bell Timmerman Jr. (D)	Fritz Hollings (D)	Oscar Frank Thornton (D)	T. C. Callison (D)	Jeff B. Bates (D)	Elridge C. Rhodes (D)	Jesse T. Anderson (D)	James C. Dozier	William L. Harrelson (D)	46D	124D	Thomas A. Wofford (D)	Olin D. Johnston (D)	6D	Stevenson/ Sparkman (D) ✗
1957	George Bell Timmerman Jr. (D)	Fritz Hollings (D)	Oscar Frank Thornton (D)	T. C. Callison (D)	Jeff B. Bates (D)	Elridge C. Rhodes (D)	Jesse T. Anderson (D)	James C. Dozier	William L. Harrelson (D)	46D	124D	Strom Thurmond (D)	Olin D. Johnston (D)	6D	Stevenson/ Kefauver (D) ✗
1958	George Bell Timmerman Jr. (D)	Fritz Hollings (D)	Oscar Frank Thornton (D)	T. C. Callison (D)	Jeff B. Bates (D)	Elridge C. Rhodes (D)	Jesse T. Anderson (D)	James C. Dozier	William L. Harrelson (D)	46D	124D	Strom Thurmond (D)	Olin D. Johnston (D)	6D	Stevenson/ Kefauver (D) ✗
1959	Fritz Hollings (D)	Burnet R. Maybank Jr. (D)	Oscar Frank Thornton (D)	Daniel R. McLeod (D)	Jeff B. Bates (D)	Elridge C. Rhodes (D)	Jesse T. Anderson (D)	Frank D. Pinkney	William L. Harrelson (D)	46D	124D	Strom Thurmond (D)	Olin D. Johnston (D)	6D	Stevenson/ Kefauver (D) ✗
1960	Fritz Hollings (D)	Burnet R. Maybank Jr. (D)	Oscar Frank Thornton (D)	Daniel R. McLeod (D)	Jeff B. Bates (D)	Elridge C. Rhodes (D)	Jesse T. Anderson (D)	Frank D. Pinkney	William L. Harrelson (D)	46D	124D	Strom Thurmond (D)	Olin D. Johnston (D)	6D	Stevenson/ Kefauver (D) ✗
1961	Fritz Hollings (D)	Burnet R. Maybank Jr. (D)	Oscar Frank Thornton (D)	Daniel R. McLeod (D)	Jeff B. Bates (D)	Elridge C. Rhodes (D)	Jesse T. Anderson (D)	Frank D. Pinkney	William L. Harrelson (D)	46D	124D	Strom Thurmond (D)	Olin D. Johnston (D)	6D	Kennedy/ Johnson (D) ✓
1962	Fritz Hollings (D)	Burnet R. Maybank Jr. (D)	Oscar Frank Thornton (D)	Daniel R. McLeod (D)	Jeff B. Bates (D)	Elridge C. Rhodes (D)	Jesse T. Anderson (D)	Frank D. Pinkney	William L. Harrelson (D)	46D	123D, 1R (Note: Charles Boineau was elected in Richmond County in a special election as the first Republican to win election to the House since 1900.)	Strom Thurmond (D)	Olin D. Johnston (D)	6D	Kennedy/ Johnson (D) ✓
1963	Donald S. Russell (D)	Robert Evander McNair (D)	Oscar Frank Thornton (D)	Daniel R. McLeod (D)	Jeff B. Bates (D)	Elridge C. Rhodes (D)	Jesse T. Anderson (D)	Frank D. Pinkney	William L. Harrelson (D)	46D	124D	Strom Thurmond (D)	Olin D. Johnston (D)	6D	Kennedy/ Johnson (D) ✓
1964	Donald S. Russell (D)	Robert Evander McNair (D)	Oscar Frank Thornton (D)	Daniel R. McLeod (D)	Jeff B. Bates (D)	Elridge C. Rhodes (D)	Jesse T. Anderson (D)	Frank D. Pinkney	William L. Harrelson (D)	46D	124D	Strom Thurmond (R)	Olin D. Johnston (D)	6D	Kennedy/ Johnson (D) ✓
1965	Robert Evander McNair (D)	vacant	Oscar Frank Thornton (D)	Daniel R. McLeod (D)	Jeff B. Bates (D)	Elridge C. Rhodes (D)	Jesse T. Anderson (D)	Frank D. Pinkney	William L. Harrelson (D)	46D	123D, 1R	Strom Thurmond (R)	Olin D. Johnston (D)	5D, 1R	Goldwater/ Miller (R) ✗
1966	Robert Evander McNair (D)	vacant	Oscar Frank Thornton (D)	Daniel R. McLeod (D)	Grady Patterson (D) (Note: First elected in a special election.)	Elridge C. Rhodes (D)	Jesse T. Anderson (D)	Frank D. Pinkney	William L. Harrelson (D)	46D	123D, 1R	Strom Thurmond (R)	Donald S. Russell (D)	5D, 1R	Goldwater/ Miller (R) ✗
1967	Robert Evander McNair (D)	John C. West (D)	Oscar Frank Thornton (D)	Daniel R. McLeod (D)	Grady Patterson (D)	J. Henry Mills (D)	Cyril B. Busbee	Frank D. Pinkney	William L. Harrelson (D)	43D, 6R, 1I	107D, 17R	Strom Thurmond (R)	Fritz Hollings (D)	5D, 1R	Goldwater/ Miller (R) ✗
1968	Robert Evander McNair (D)	John C. West (D)	Oscar Frank Thornton (D)	Daniel R. McLeod (D)	Grady Patterson (D)	J. Henry Mills (D)	Cyril B. Busbee	Frank D. Pinkney	William L. Harrelson (D)	43D, 6R, 1I	107D, 17R	Strom Thurmond (R)	Fritz Hollings (D)	5D, 1R	Goldwater/ Miller (R) ✗
1969	Robert Evander McNair (D)	John C. West (D)	Oscar Frank Thornton (D)	Daniel R. McLeod (D)	Grady Patterson (D)	J. Henry Mills (D)	Cyril B. Busbee	Frank D. Pinkney	William L. Harrelson (D)	47D, 3R	119D, 5R	Strom Thurmond (R)	Fritz Hollings (D)	5D, 1R	Nixon/ Agnew (R) ✓
1970	Robert Evander McNair (D)	John C. West (D)	Oscar Frank Thornton (D)	Daniel R. McLeod (D)	Grady Patterson (D)	J. Henry Mills (D)	Cyril B. Busbee	Frank D. Pinkney	William L. Harrelson (D)	47D, 3R	119D, 5R	Strom Thurmond (R)	Fritz Hollings (D)	5D, 1R	Nixon/ Agnew (R) ✓
1971	John C. West (D)	Earle Morris Jr. (D)	Oscar Frank Thornton (D)	Daniel R. McLeod (D)	Grady Patterson (D)	J. Henry Mills (D)	Cyril B. Busbee	Robert L. McCrady (D)	William L. Harrelson (D)	44D, 2R	113D, 11R	Strom Thurmond (R)	Fritz Hollings (D)	5D, 1R	Nixon/ Agnew (R) ✓
1972	John C. West (D)	Earle Morris Jr. (D)	Oscar Frank Thornton (D)	Daniel R. McLeod (D)	Grady Patterson (D)	J. Henry Mills (D)	Cyril B. Busbee	Robert L. McCrady (D)	William L. Harrelson (D)	44D, 2R	113D, 11R	Strom Thurmond (R)	Fritz Hollings (D)	5D, 1R	Nixon/ Agnew (R) ✓
1973	John C. West (D)	Earle Morris Jr. (D)	Oscar Frank Thornton (D)	Daniel R. McLeod (D)	Grady Patterson (D)	J. Henry Mills (D)	Cyril B. Busbee	Robert L. McCrady (D)	William L. Harrelson (D)	43D, 3R	103D, 21R	Strom Thurmond (R)	Fritz Hollings (D)	4D, 2R	Nixon/ Agnew (R) ✓
1974	John C. West (D)	Earle Morris Jr. (D)	Oscar Frank Thornton (D)	Daniel R. McLeod (D)	Grady Patterson (D)	J. Henry Mills (D)	Cyril B. Busbee	Robert L. McCrady (D)	William L. Harrelson (D)	43D, 3R	103D, 21R	Strom Thurmond (R)	Fritz Hollings (D)	4D, 2R	Nixon/ Agnew (R) ✓
1975	James B. Edwards (R)	W. Brantley Harvey Jr. (D)	Oscar Frank Thornton (D)	Daniel R. McLeod (D)	Grady Patterson (D)	J. Henry Mills (D)	Cyril B. Busbee	Robert L. McCrady (D)	William L. Harrelson (D)	43D, 3R	108D, 16R	Strom Thurmond (R)	Fritz Hollings (D)	5D, 1R	Nixon/ Agnew (R) ✓
1976	James B. Edwards (R)	W. Brantley Harvey Jr. (D)	Oscar Frank Thornton (D)	Daniel R. McLeod (D)	Grady Patterson (D)	J. Henry Mills (D)	Cyril B. Busbee	Robert L. McCrady (D)	William L. Harrelson (D)	43D, 3R	108D, 16R	Strom Thurmond (R)	Fritz Hollings (D)	5D, 1R	Nixon/ Agnew (R) ✓
1976	James B. Edwards (R)	W. Brantley Harvey Jr. (D)	Oscar Frank Thornton (D)	Daniel R. McLeod (D)	Grady Patterson (D)	Earle Morris Jr. (D)	Cyril B. Busbee	Robert L. McCrady (D)	William L. Harrelson (D)	43D, 3R	108D, 16R	Strom Thurmond (R)	Fritz Hollings (D)	5D, 1R	Nixon/ Agnew (R) ✓
1977	James B. Edwards (R)	W. Brantley Harvey Jr. (D)	Oscar Frank Thornton (D)	Daniel R. McLeod (D)	Grady Patterson (D)	Earle Morris Jr. (D)	Cyril B. Busbee	Robert L. McCrady (D)	G. Bryan Patrick (R)	42D, 4R	112D, 12R	Strom Thurmond (R)	Fritz Hollings (D)	5D, 1R	Carter/ Mondale (D) ✓
1978	James B. Edwards (R)	W. Brantley Harvey Jr. (D)	Oscar Frank Thornton (D)	Daniel R. McLeod (D)	Grady Patterson (D)	Earle Morris Jr. (D)	Cyril B. Busbee	Robert L. McCrady (D)	G. Bryan Patrick (R)	42D, 4R	112D, 12R	Strom Thurmond (R)	Fritz Hollings (D)	5D, 1R	Carter/ Mondale (D) ✓
1979	Richard Riley (D)	Nancy Stevenson (D)	John Tucker Campbell (D)	Daniel R. McLeod (D)	Grady Patterson (D)	Earle Morris Jr. (D)	Charlie G. Williams (D)	T. Eston Marchant (D)	G. Bryan Patrick (R)	42D, 4R	108D, 16R	Strom Thurmond (R)	Fritz Hollings (D)	4D, 2R	Carter/ Mondale (D) ✓
1980	Richard Riley (D)	Nancy Stevenson (D)	John Tucker Campbell (D)	Daniel R. McLeod (D)	Grady Patterson (D)	Earle Morris Jr. (D)	Charlie G. Williams (D)	T. Eston Marchant (D)	G. Bryan Patrick (R)	42D, 4R	108D, 16R	Strom Thurmond (R)	Fritz Hollings (D)	4D, 2R	Carter/ Mondale (D) ✓
1981	Richard Riley (D)	Nancy Stevenson (D)	John Tucker Campbell (D)	Daniel R. McLeod (D)	Grady Patterson (D)	Earle Morris Jr. (D)	Charlie G. Williams (D)	T. Eston Marchant (D)	G. Bryan Patrick (R)	39D, 7R	108D, 16R	Strom Thurmond (R)	Fritz Hollings (D)	4R, 2D	Reagan/ Bush (R) ✓
1982	Richard Riley (D)	Nancy Stevenson (D)	John Tucker Campbell (D)	Daniel R. McLeod (D)	Grady Patterson (D)	Earle Morris Jr. (D)	Charlie G. Williams (D)	T. Eston Marchant (D)	G. Bryan Patrick (R)	39D, 7R	108D, 16R	Strom Thurmond (R)	Fritz Hollings (D)	4R, 2D	Reagan/ Bush (R) ✓
1983	Richard Riley (D)	Michael R. Daniel (D)	John Tucker Campbell (D)	Thomas T. Medlock (D)	Grady Patterson (D)	Earle Morris Jr. (D)	Charlie G. Williams (D)	T. Eston Marchant (D)	Les Tindal (D)	39D, 7R	105D, 19R	Strom Thurmond (R)	Fritz Hollings (D)	3D, 3R	Reagan/ Bush (R) ✓
1984	Richard Riley (D)	Michael R. Daniel (D)	John Tucker Campbell (D)	Thomas T. Medlock (D)	Grady Patterson (D)	Earle Morris Jr. (D)	Charlie G. Williams (D)	T. Eston Marchant (D)	Les Tindal (D)	39D, 7R	105D, 19R	Strom Thurmond (R)	Fritz Hollings (D)	3D, 3R	Reagan/ Bush (R) ✓
1985	Richard Riley (D)	Michael R. Daniel (D)	John Tucker Campbell (D)	Thomas T. Medlock (D)	Grady Patterson (D)	Earle Morris Jr. (D)	Charlie G. Williams (D)	T. Eston Marchant (D)	Les Tindal (D)	36D, 10R	96D, 28R	Strom Thurmond (R)	Fritz Hollings (D)	3D, 3R	Reagan/ Bush (R) ✓
1986	Richard Riley (D)	Michael R. Daniel (D)	John Tucker Campbell (D)	Thomas T. Medlock (D)	Grady Patterson (D)	Earle Morris Jr. (D)	Charlie G. Williams (D)	T. Eston Marchant (D)	Les Tindal (D)	36D, 10R	96D, 28R	Strom Thurmond (R)	Fritz Hollings (D)	3D, 3R	Reagan/ Bush (R) ✓
1987	Carroll A. Campbell Jr. (R)	Nick Theodore (D)	John Tucker Campbell (D)	Thomas T. Medlock (D)	Grady Patterson (D)	Earle Morris Jr. (D)	Charlie G. Williams (D)	T. Eston Marchant (D)	Les Tindal (D)	36D, 10R	92D, 32R	Strom Thurmond (R)	Fritz Hollings (D)	4D, 2R	Reagan/ Bush (R) ✓
1988	Carroll A. Campbell Jr. (R)	Nick Theodore (D)	John Tucker Campbell (D)	Thomas T. Medlock (D)	Grady Patterson (D)	Earle Morris Jr. (D)	Charlie G. Williams (D)	T. Eston Marchant (D)	Les Tindal (D)	36D, 10R	92D, 32R	Strom Thurmond (R)	Fritz Hollings (D)	4D, 2R	Reagan/ Bush (R) ✓
1989	Carroll A. Campbell Jr. (R)	Nick Theodore (D)	John Tucker Campbell (D)	Thomas T. Medlock (D)	Grady Patterson (D)	Earle Morris Jr. (D)	Charlie G. Williams (D)	T. Eston Marchant (D)	Les Tindal (D)	35D, 11R	88D, 36R	Strom Thurmond (R)	Fritz Hollings (D)	4D, 2R	Bush/ Quayle (R) ✓
1990	Carroll A. Campbell Jr. (R)	Nick Theodore (D)	John Tucker Campbell (D)	Thomas T. Medlock (D)	Grady Patterson (D)	Earle Morris Jr. (D)	Charlie G. Williams (D)	T. Eston Marchant (D)	Les Tindal (D)	35D, 11R	88D, 36R	Strom Thurmond (R)	Fritz Hollings (D)	4D, 2R	Bush/ Quayle (R) ✓
1990	Carroll A. Campbell Jr. (R)	Nick Theodore (D)	John Tucker Campbell (D)	Thomas T. Medlock (D)	Grady Patterson (D)	Earle Morris Jr. (D)	Charlie G. Williams (D)	T. Eston Marchant (D)	Les Tindal (R)	35D, 11R	88D, 36R	Strom Thurmond (R)	Fritz Hollings (D)	4D, 2R	Bush/ Quayle (R) ✓
1991	Carroll A. Campbell Jr. (R)	Nick Theodore (D)	Jim Miles (R)	Thomas T. Medlock (D)	Grady Patterson (D)	Earle Morris Jr. (D)	Barbara Nielsen (R)	T. Eston Marchant (D)	Les Tindal (R)	35D, 11R	80D, 44R	Strom Thurmond (R)	Fritz Hollings (D)	4D, 2R	Bush/ Quayle (R) ✓
1992	Carroll A. Campbell Jr. (R)	Nick Theodore (D)	Jim Miles (R)	Thomas T. Medlock (D)	Grady Patterson (D)	Earle Morris Jr. (D)	Barbara Nielsen (R)	T. Eston Marchant (D)	Les Tindal (R)	35D, 11R	80D, 44R	Strom Thurmond (R)	Fritz Hollings (D)	4D, 2R	Bush/ Quayle (R) ✓
1993	Carroll A. Campbell Jr. (R)	Nick Theodore (D)	Jim Miles (R)	Thomas T. Medlock (D)	Grady Patterson (D)	Earle Morris Jr. (D)	Barbara Nielsen (R)	T. Eston Marchant (D)	Les Tindal (R)	30D, 16R	74D, 50R	Strom Thurmond (R)	Fritz Hollings (D)	3D, 3R	Bush/ Quayle (R) ✗
1994	Carroll A. Campbell Jr. (R)	Nick Theodore (D)	Jim Miles (R)	Thomas T. Medlock (D)	Grady Patterson (D)	Earle Morris Jr. (D)	Barbara Nielsen (R)	T. Eston Marchant (D)	Les Tindal (R)	30D, 16R	74D, 50R	Strom Thurmond (R)	Fritz Hollings (D)	3D, 3R	Bush/ Quayle (R) ✗
1995	David Beasley (R)	Bob Peeler (R)	Jim Miles (R)	Charlie Condon (R)	Richard Eckstrom (R)	Earle Morris Jr. (D)	Barbara Nielsen (R)	Stan Spears (D)	Les Tindal (R)	26D, 20R	70R, 54D	Strom Thurmond (R)	Fritz Hollings (D)	4R, 2D	Bush/ Quayle (R) ✗
1995	David Beasley (R)	Bob Peeler (R)	Jim Miles (R)	Charlie Condon (R)	Richard Eckstrom (R)	Earle Morris Jr. (D)	Barbara Nielsen (R)	Stan Spears (R)	Les Tindal (R)	26D, 20R	70R, 54D	Strom Thurmond (R)	Fritz Hollings (D)	4R, 2D	Bush/ Quayle (R) ✗
1996	David Beasley (R)	Bob Peeler (R)	Jim Miles (R)	Charlie Condon (R)	Richard Eckstrom (R)	Earle Morris Jr. (D)	Barbara Nielsen (R)	Stan Spears (R)	Les Tindal (R)	26D, 20R	70R, 54D	Strom Thurmond (R)	Fritz Hollings (D)	4R, 2D	Bush/ Quayle (R) ✗
1997	David Beasley (R)	Bob Peeler (R)	Jim Miles (R)	Charlie Condon (R)	Richard Eckstrom (R)	Earle Morris Jr. (D)	Barbara Nielsen (R)	Stan Spears (R)	Les Tindal (R)	25D, 21R	71R, 53D	Strom Thurmond (R)	Fritz Hollings (D)	4R, 2D	Dole/ Kemp (R) ✗
1998	David Beasley (R)	Bob Peeler (R)	Jim Miles (R)	Charlie Condon (R)	Richard Eckstrom (R)	Earle Morris Jr. (D)	Barbara Nielsen (R)	Stan Spears (R)	Les Tindal (R)	25D, 21R	71R, 53D	Strom Thurmond (R)	Fritz Hollings (D)	4R, 2D	Dole/ Kemp (R) ✗
1999	Jim Hodges (D)	Bob Peeler (R)	Jim Miles (R)	Charlie Condon (R)	Grady Patterson (D)	Jim Lander (D)	Inez Tenenbaum (D)	Stan Spears (R)	Les Tindal (R)	25D, 21R	67R, 57D	Strom Thurmond (R)	Fritz Hollings (D)	4R, 2D	Dole/ Kemp (R) ✗
2000	Jim Hodges (D)	Bob Peeler (R)	Jim Miles (R)	Charlie Condon (R)	Grady Patterson (D)	Jim Lander (D)	Inez Tenenbaum (D)	Stan Spears (R)	Les Tindal (R)	25D, 21R	67R, 57D	Strom Thurmond (R)	Fritz Hollings (D)	4R, 2D	Dole/ Kemp (R) ✗
2001	Jim Hodges (D)	Bob Peeler (R)	Jim Miles (R)	Charlie Condon (R)	Grady Patterson (D)	Jim Lander (D)	Inez Tenenbaum (D)	Stan Spears (R)	Les Tindal (R)	25R, 21D	71R, 53D	Strom Thurmond (R)	Fritz Hollings (D)	4R, 2D	Bush/ Cheney (R) ✓
2002	Jim Hodges (D)	Bob Peeler (R)	Jim Miles (R)	Charlie Condon (R)	Grady Patterson (D)	Jim Lander (D)	Inez Tenenbaum (D)	Stan Spears (R)	Les Tindal (R)	25R, 21D	71R, 53D	Strom Thurmond (R)	Fritz Hollings (D)	4R, 2D	Bush/ Cheney (R) ✓
2003	Mark Sanford (R)	André Bauer (R)	**Mark Hammond (R)**	Henry McMaster (R)	Grady Patterson (D)	Richard Eckstrom (R)	Inez Tenenbaum (D)	Stan Spears (R)	Charles Sharpe (R)	26R, 20D	73R, 51D	Lindsey Graham (R)	Fritz Hollings (D)	4R, 2D	Bush/ Cheney (R) ✓
2004	Mark Sanford (R)	André Bauer (R)	**Mark Hammond (R)**	Henry McMaster (R)	Grady Patterson (D)	Richard Eckstrom (R)	Inez Tenenbaum (D)	Stan Spears (R)	Charles Sharpe (R)	26R, 20D	73R, 51D	Lindsey Graham (R)	Fritz Hollings (D)	4R, 2D	Bush/ Cheney (R) ✓
2004	Mark Sanford (R)	André Bauer (R)	**Mark Hammond (R)**	Henry McMaster (R)	Grady Patterson (D)	Richard Eckstrom (R)	Inez Tenenbaum (D)	Stan Spears (R)	**Hugh Weathers (R)**	26R, 20D	73R, 51D	Lindsey Graham (R)	Fritz Hollings (D)	4R, 2D	Bush/ Cheney (R) ✓
2005	Mark Sanford (R)	André Bauer (R)	**Mark Hammond (R)**	Henry McMaster (R)	Grady Patterson (D)	Richard Eckstrom (R)	Inez Tenenbaum (D)	Stan Spears (R)	**Hugh Weathers (R)**	26R, 20D	74R, 50D	Lindsey Graham (R)	Jim DeMint (R)	4R, 2D	Bush/ Cheney (R) ✓
2006	Mark Sanford (R)	André Bauer (R)	**Mark Hammond (R)**	Henry McMaster (R)	Grady Patterson (D)	Richard Eckstrom (R)	Inez Tenenbaum (D)	Stan Spears (R)	**Hugh Weathers (R)**	26R, 20D	74R, 50D	Lindsey Graham (R)	Jim DeMint (R)	4R, 2D	Bush/ Cheney (R) ✓
2007	Mark Sanford (R)	André Bauer (R)	**Mark Hammond (R)**	Henry McMaster (R)	Thomas Ravenel (R)	Richard Eckstrom (R)	Jim Rex (D)	Stan Spears (R)	**Hugh Weathers (R)**	26R, 20D	73R, 51D	Lindsey Graham (R)	Jim DeMint (R)	4R, 2D	Bush/ Cheney (R) ✓
2007	Mark Sanford (R)	André Bauer (R)	**Mark Hammond (R)**	Henry McMaster (R)	Ken Wingate (R) (Note: Appointed on an interim basis by Governor Mark Sanford.)	Richard Eckstrom (R)	Jim Rex (D)	Stan Spears (R)	**Hugh Weathers (R)**	26R, 19D	73R, 51D	Lindsey Graham (R)	Jim DeMint (R)	4R, 2D	Bush/ Cheney (R) ✓
2007	Mark Sanford (R)	André Bauer (R)	**Mark Hammond (R)**	Henry McMaster (R)	Converse Chellis (R) (Note: Elected by state legislature to fill vacancy.)	Richard Eckstrom (R)	Jim Rex (D)	Stan Spears (R)	**Hugh Weathers (R)**	27R, 19D	73R, 51D	Lindsey Graham (R)	Jim DeMint (R)	4R, 2D	Bush/ Cheney (R) ✓
2008	Mark Sanford (R)	André Bauer (R)	**Mark Hammond (R)**	Henry McMaster (R)	Converse Chellis (R)	Richard Eckstrom (R)	Jim Rex (D)	Stan Spears (R)	**Hugh Weathers (R)**	27R, 19D	73R, 51D	Lindsey Graham (R)	Jim DeMint (R)	4R, 2D	Bush/ Cheney (R) ✓
2009	Mark Sanford (R)	André Bauer (R)	**Mark Hammond (R)**	Henry McMaster (R)	Converse Chellis (R)	Richard Eckstrom (R)	Jim Rex (D)	Stan Spears (R)	**Hugh Weathers (R)**	27R, 19D	73R, 51D	Lindsey Graham (R)	Jim DeMint (R)	4R, 2D	McCain/ Palin (R) ✗
2010	Mark Sanford (R)	André Bauer (R)	**Mark Hammond (R)**	Henry McMaster (R)	Converse Chellis (R)	Richard Eckstrom (R)	Jim Rex (D)	Stan Spears (R)	**Hugh Weathers (R)**	27R, 19D	73R, 51D	Lindsey Graham (R)	Jim DeMint (R)	4R, 2D	McCain/ Palin (R) ✗
2011	Nikki Haley (R) (Note: Resigned January 24, 2017 upon confirmation as United States Ambassador to the United Nations.)	Ken Ard (R)	**Mark Hammond (R)**	**Alan Wilson (R)**	**Curtis Loftis (R)**	Richard Eckstrom (R)	Mick Zais (R)	Robert Livingston (R) (Note: Last elected Adjutant General, retired on January 17, 2019.)	**Hugh Weathers (R)**	27R, 19D	76R, 48D	Lindsey Graham (R)	Jim DeMint (R)	5R, 1D	McCain/ Palin (R) ✗
2012	Nikki Haley (R)	Ken Ard (R)	**Mark Hammond (R)**	**Alan Wilson (R)**	**Curtis Loftis (R)**	Richard Eckstrom (R)	Mick Zais (R)	Robert Livingston (R)	**Hugh Weathers (R)**	27R, 19D	76R, 48D	Lindsey Graham (R)	Jim DeMint (R)	5R, 1D	McCain/ Palin (R) ✗
2012	Nikki Haley (R)	Glenn F. McConnell (R)	**Mark Hammond (R)**	**Alan Wilson (R)**	**Curtis Loftis (R)**	Richard Eckstrom (R)	Mick Zais (R)	Robert Livingston (R)	**Hugh Weathers (R)**	27R, 19D	76R, 48D	Lindsey Graham (R)	Jim DeMint (R)	5R, 1D	McCain/ Palin (R) ✗
2013	Nikki Haley (R)	Glenn F. McConnell (R)	**Mark Hammond (R)**	**Alan Wilson (R)**	**Curtis Loftis (R)**	Richard Eckstrom (R)	Mick Zais (R)	Robert Livingston (R)	**Hugh Weathers (R)**	28R, 18D	78R, 46D	Lindsey Graham (R)	**Tim Scott (R)**	6R, 1D	Romney/ Ryan (R) ✗
2014	Nikki Haley (R)	Glenn F. McConnell (R)	**Mark Hammond (R)**	**Alan Wilson (R)**	**Curtis Loftis (R)**	Richard Eckstrom (R)	Mick Zais (R)	Robert Livingston (R)	**Hugh Weathers (R)**	28R, 18D	78R, 46D	Lindsey Graham (R)	**Tim Scott (R)**	6R, 1D	Romney/ Ryan (R) ✗
2014	Nikki Haley (R)	Yancey McGill (D)	**Mark Hammond (R)**	**Alan Wilson (R)**	**Curtis Loftis (R)**	Richard Eckstrom (R)	Mick Zais (R)	Robert Livingston (R)	**Hugh Weathers (R)**	28R, 18D	78R, 46D	Lindsey Graham (R)	**Tim Scott (R)**	6R, 1D	Romney/ Ryan (R) ✗
2015	Nikki Haley (R)	Henry McMaster (R)	**Mark Hammond (R)**	**Alan Wilson (R)**	**Curtis Loftis (R)**	Richard Eckstrom (R)	Molly Spearman (R)	Robert Livingston (R)	**Hugh Weathers (R)**	28R, 17D 1V (Note: State Senator Clementa C. Pinckney was assassinated in June 2015.)	78R, 46D	Lindsey Graham (R)	**Tim Scott (R)**	6R, 1D	Romney/ Ryan (R) ✗
2016	Nikki Haley (R)	Henry McMaster (R)	**Mark Hammond (R)**	**Alan Wilson (R)**	**Curtis Loftis (R)**	Richard Eckstrom (R)	Molly Spearman (R)	Robert Livingston (R)	**Hugh Weathers (R)**	28R, 18D (Note: Margie Bright Matthews succeeded Pinckney.)	78R, 46D	Lindsey Graham (R)	**Tim Scott (R)**	6R, 1D	Romney/ Ryan (R) ✗
2017	**Henry McMaster (R)**	Kevin L. Bryant (R)	**Mark Hammond (R)**	**Alan Wilson (R)**	**Curtis Loftis (R)**	Richard Eckstrom (R)	Molly Spearman (R)	Robert Livingston (R)	**Hugh Weathers (R)**	28R, 18D	80R, 44D	Lindsey Graham (R)	**Tim Scott (R)**	6R, 1D	Trump/ Pence (R) ✓
2018	**Henry McMaster (R)**	Kevin L. Bryant (R)	**Mark Hammond (R)**	**Alan Wilson (R)**	**Curtis Loftis (R)**	Richard Eckstrom (R)	Molly Spearman (R)	Robert Livingston (R)	**Hugh Weathers (R)**	28R, 18D	80R, 44D	Lindsey Graham (R)	**Tim Scott (R)**	6R, 1D	Trump/ Pence (R) ✓
2019	**Henry McMaster (R)**	**Pamela Evette (R)**	**Mark Hammond (R)**	**Alan Wilson (R)**	**Curtis Loftis (R)**	Richard Eckstrom (R)	Molly Spearman (R)	appointed (Note: Adjutant General became an appointed position in 2019.)	**Hugh Weathers (R)**	27R, 19D	80R, 44D	Lindsey Graham (R)	**Tim Scott (R)**	5R, 2D	Trump/ Pence (R) ✓

== 2020–present ==
Year	Executive offices								State Legislature		United States Congress			Electoral votes
Year	Governor	Lt. Governor	Sec. of State	Atty. Gen.	Treasurer	Comptroller	Supt. of Ed.	Comm. of Ag.	State Senate	State House	U.S. Senator (Class II)	U.S. Senator (Class III)	U.S. House	Electoral votes
2020	**Henry McMaster (R)**	**Pamela Evette (R)**	Mark Hammond (R)	**Alan Wilson (R)**	Curtis Loftis (R)	Richard Eckstrom (R)	Molly Spearman (R)	**Hugh Weathers (R)**	27R, 19D	80R, 44D	Lindsey Graham (R)	Tim Scott (R)	5R, 2D	Trump/ Pence (R) ✗
2021	**Henry McMaster (R)**	**Pamela Evette (R)**	Mark Hammond (R)	**Alan Wilson (R)**	Curtis Loftis (R)	Richard Eckstrom (R)	Molly Spearman (R)	**Hugh Weathers (R)**	30R, 16D	81R, 43D	Lindsey Graham (R)	Tim Scott (R)	**6R, 1D**	Trump/ Pence (R) ✗
2022	**Henry McMaster (R)**	**Pamela Evette (R)**	**Mark Hammond (R)**	**Alan Wilson (R)**	**Curtis Loftis (R)**	Richard Eckstrom (R)	Molly Spearman (R)	**Hugh Weathers (R)**	30R, 16D	81R, 43D	Lindsey Graham (R)	**Tim Scott (R)**	**6R, 1D**	Trump/ Pence (R) ✗
2023	**Henry McMaster (R)**	**Pamela Evette (R)**	Mark Hammond (R)	**Alan Wilson (R)**	Curtis Loftis (R)	**Brian J. Gaines (D) (Note: Appointed by Governor Henry McMaster.)**	**Ellen Weaver (R)**	**Hugh Weathers (R)**	30R, 15D, 1I	88R, 36D	Lindsey Graham (R)	Tim Scott (R)	**6R, 1D**	Trump/ Pence (R) ✗
2024	**Henry McMaster (R)**	**Pamela Evette (R)**	Mark Hammond (R)	**Alan Wilson (R)**	Curtis Loftis (R)	**Brian J. Gaines (D)**	**Ellen Weaver (R)**	**Hugh Weathers (R)**	30R, 15D, 1I	88R, 36D	Lindsey Graham (R)	Tim Scott (R)	**6R, 1D**	Trump/ Vance (R) ✓
2025	**Henry McMaster (R)**	**Pamela Evette (R)**	Mark Hammond (R)	**Alan Wilson (R)**	Curtis Loftis (R)	**Brian J. Gaines (D)**	**Ellen Weaver (R)**	**Hugh Weathers (R)**	**34R, 12D**	88R, 36D	Lindsey Graham (R)	Tim Scott (R)	**6R, 1D**	Trump/ Vance (R) ✓
2026	**Henry McMaster (R)**	**Pamela Evette (R)**	Mark Hammond (R)	**Alan Wilson (R)**	Curtis Loftis (R)	**Brian J. Gaines (D)**	**Ellen Weaver (R)**	**Hugh Weathers (R)**	**34R, 12D**	**89R, 35D**	Lindsey Graham (R)	Tim Scott (R)	**6R, 1D**	Trump/ Vance (R) ✓
2026	**Henry McMaster (R)**	**Pamela Evette (R)**	Mark Hammond (R)	**Alan Wilson (R)**	Curtis Loftis (R)	**Brian J. Gaines (D)**	**Ellen Weaver (R)**	**Hugh Weathers (R)**	**34R, 12D**	**89R, 35D**	**Darline Graham (R)**	Tim Scott (R)	**6R, 1D**	Trump/ Vance (R) ✓
2027	Alan Wilson (R)	Mike Reichenbach (R)	Mark Hammond (R)	David Stumbo (R)	Curtis Loftis (R)	Mike Burkhold (R)	**Ellen Weaver (R)**	Cody Simpson (R)	**34R, 12D**	79R, 45D	Annie Andrews (D)	Tim Scott (R)	5R, 2D	Trump/ Vance (R) ✓

== See also ==
- Government and politics in South Carolina
- Politics of South Carolina
- Elections in South Carolina
