= Nicholas Lechmere =

Nicholas Lechmere may refer to:

- Nicholas Lechmere (priest) (1700/1–1770), English Archdeacon of Winchester
- Sir Nicholas Lechmere (politician, died 1701) (1613–1701), English MP and judge
- Nicholas Lechmere, 1st Baron Lechmere (1675–1727), MP, Solicitor-General and Attorney General
- Nicholas Lechmere Charlton (1733–1807), MP for Worcester (called Nicholas Lechmere until 1784)
- Col. Nicholas Lechmere (1749-1782) was a British loyalist commander during the American Revolutionary War, served at the Capture of Fort Balfour.
