= Robert Creswell =

American politician (1772–1850)

26th Lieutenant Governor of South Carolina
- In office December 10, 1814 – December 5, 1816
- Governor: David Rogerson Williams
- Preceded by: Eldred Simkins
- Succeeded by: John A. Cuthbert

th Comptroller General of South Carolina
- In office 1817–1819
- Preceded by: George Warren Cross
- Succeeded by: John S. Cogdell

Personal details
- Born: 1767
- Died: September 11, 1850 (aged 82–83) Eutaw, Alabama
- Party: Federalist Party; Democratic-Republican

Robert Creswell (1772–1850) was an American lawyer and politician who served as the 26th lieutenant governor of South Carolina and the 4th comptroller general of South Carolina.

== Biography ==
Robert Creswell was born in approximately 1772 in the Province of South Carolina. He practiced law in the Laurens District of South Carolina. He first entered politics as a Federalist when he was elected to the South Carolina House of Representatives in 1789, but he lost reelection in 1802. By 1814, Creswell switched to the Democratic-Republican party and was elected lieutenant governor; he served one term from 1814 to 1816. He was elected comptroller general in 1816 and served until 1818. Upon retirement, he became a candidate for the appointment of an appellate judge and as president of the Bank of South Carolina, but refused both positions and returned to his legal practice.
