= Edward Wilkinson (commissioner) =

South Carolina magistrate and trader with Cherokee

South Carolina Commissioner for Cherokee Affairs
- In office c. 1766 – c. 1767

South Carolina Trade-Factor to the Cherokee Nation
- In office July 19, 1762 – 1765

Personal details
- Born: 1733 Charleston, South Carolina, United States
- Died: 12 July 1771 (aged 37–38) Charleston, South Carolina, United States
- Spouse: Anne Ninian
- Children: 3, including Mary Wilkinson
- Occupation: Merchant; Diplomat; Surveyor

Edward Wilkinson was an American eighteenth century colonial official in South Carolina where he served several roles with the Cherokee Nation. Helping to establish trade and borders between the Province of South Carolina and the Cherokee Nation. His career overlapped with the shifting colonial approaches to Native American trade and diplomacy in the 1760s and 1770s, prior to the American Revolution.

== Early life ==
Edward Wilkinson was born in 1733 to Francis Wilkinson and Margaret Arden. He married Anne Ninian and they had three children together. Edward was a great-grandson of Governor Joseph Morton, a great-grandson of Col. Andrew Percivall, and a 2nd great-grandson of Vice Admiral Benjamin Blake.

== Trade Operations with Cherokee Nation ==
In the 1760s, trade between the Cherokee and South Carolina was pivotal to frontier relations. Before state regulations, private traders operated independently, without consistent prices, or practices, thus straining relations with the Cherokee by giving them bad trade deals. The colonial assembly of South Carolina passed an act in May of 1762, creating a public monopoly. Edward Wilkinson was appointed as a Factor (agent) to begin steady trade relations with Native Americans on the frontier at Fort Prince George. Fort Prince George had been established by the colony in 1753 to facilitate trade and serve as a military and diplomatic center between British settlers and Cherokee towns.

== Surveying and Border Commission ==
Edward Wilkinson's career expanded beyond trade and into territorial diplomacy. By the mid‑1760s, colonial officials were under pressure to establish clear borders with Native lands to reduce settler‑Cherokee conflict. A Colonial Office record from 1766 identifies a map showing the boundary line between the Province of South Carolina and the Cherokee Indian Country drawn at Fort Prince George on 8 May 1766, with Wilkinson listed as a Commissioner present at the survey. It implies his involvement in negotiating and documenting the frontier line alongside Native American leaders. Secondary accounts describe an expedition in April 1766 in which Wilkinson — identified as “former factor in the Indian trade at Fort Prince George” — worked with other provincial figures and Cherokee representatives to run a boundary line from the Savannah River to the Reedy River, portions of which became the basis for the later boundary between what is now South Carolina’s Upstate and Cherokee lands. This work was part of efforts to translate diplomatic agreements with the Cherokee into demarcated territorial boundaries, a process critical for colonial settlement and Native sovereignty issues. Colonial governor records from the period note proclamations requiring settlers to remove unauthorized settlements beyond newly established lines, underscoring the political significance of these commissions.

== Later Life and Legacy ==
Edward Wilkinson returned to Charleston after his work on the frontier. He died in Charleston at age 37–38, leaving behind his wife and three young children. His daughter Mary would go on to marry Secretary and Governor Paul Hamilton.
