= Robert Budd Gilchrist =

American judge

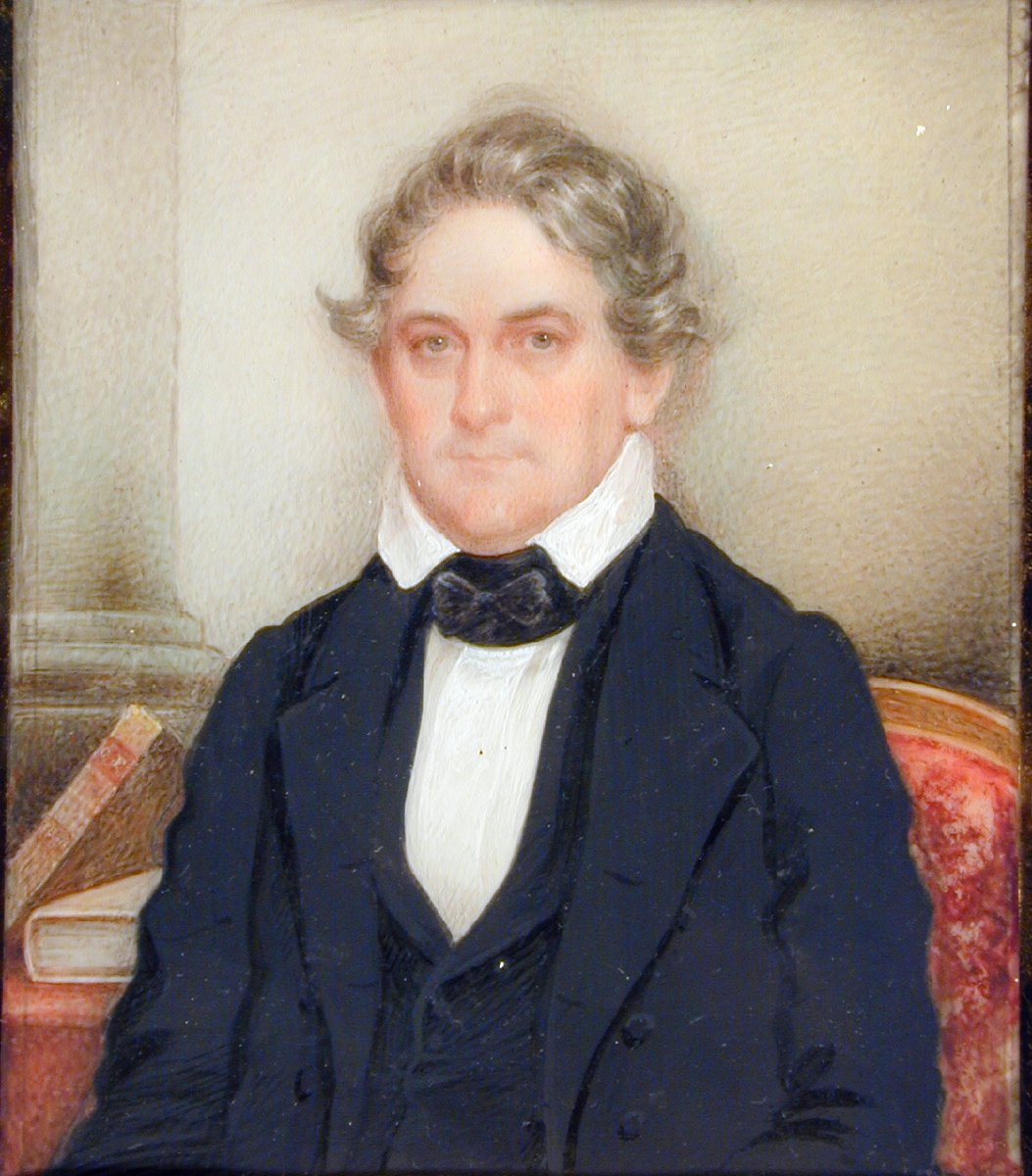

Judge of the United States District Court for the District of South Carolina
- In office October 30, 1839 – May 1, 1856
- Appointed by: Martin Van Buren
- Preceded by: Thomas Lee
- Succeeded by: Andrew Gordon Magrath

Personal details
- Born: Robert Budd Gilchrist; September 28, 1796 Charleston, South Carolina, US
- Died: May 1, 1856 (aged 59) Charleston, South Carolina, US
- Education: University of South Carolina (A.B., A.M.) read law

Robert Budd Gilchrist (September 28, 1796 – May 1, 1856) was a United States district judge of the United States District Court for the District of South Carolina.

== Education and career ==
Born in Charleston, South Carolina, Gilchrist received an Artium Baccalaureus degree from South Carolina College (now the University of South Carolina) in 1814 and an Artium Magister degree from the same institution in 1817. He read law to enter the bar in 1818, and was in private practice in Charleston from then until 1831. He was the United States Attorney for the District of South Carolina from 1831 to 1839.

== Federal judicial service ==
Gilchrist received a recess appointment from President Martin Van Buren on October 30, 1839, to a seat on the United States District Court for the District of South Carolina vacated by Judge Thomas Lee. He was nominated to the same position by President Van Buren on January 23, 1840. He was confirmed by the United States Senate on February 17, 1840, and received his commission the same day. His service terminated on May 1, 1856, due to his death in Charleston.

== Sources ==
Legal offices
| Preceded by Thomas Lee | Judge of the United States District Court for the District of South Carolina; 1840–1856 | Succeeded by Andrew Gordon Magrath |
