= Nicholas Lechmere (colonel) =

Loyalist militia officer in South Carolina during the American Revolution

Colonel Nicholas Lechmere
- Born: 18 March 1749
- Died: 17 March 1782 (aged 32); Charleston, South Carolina
- Burial place: Saint Philip's Episcopal Church Cemetery, Charleston, South Carolina
- Spouse: Marie Catherine Deveaux
- Military career
- Allegiance: British Empire
- Branch: SC Loyalist Militia
- Service years: 1775–1782
- Rank: Colonel
- Conflicts: American Revolutionary War; Southern Theater; Capture of Fort Balfour (POW)

Colonel Nicholas Lechmere was an American loyalist commander in South Carolina during the American Revolutionary War. He most notably commanded Fort Balfour during the Capture of Fort Balfour against Patriot militia led by William Harden.

== Early life ==
Nicholas Lechmere was born in 1749 to Nicholas Winthrop Lechmere (1722–1814) and Elizabeth Gardiner (1728–1788).

== Military Service & Death ==
During the American Revolution, Lechmere remained loyal to Great Britain and joined the Loyalist cause in South Carolina. He rose to the rank of colonel, indicating a position of significant responsibility, likely involving the organization and leadership of Loyalist militia or provincial troops in the southern colonies.

The southern theater of the war—particularly in South Carolina—was marked by intense civil conflict between Loyalists and Patriots. British strategy in the region relied heavily on Loyalist support, especially following the capture of Charleston in 1780. Officers such as Lechmere played a key role in maintaining British control in contested areas, like at Fort Balfour where Lechmere was commanding a garrison. He was captured during the Capture of Fort Balfour alongside his father in law. Lechmere died shortly thereafter in 1782.
