= Charles Drayton =

Physician in Charleston, 1743-1780

Charles Drayton I
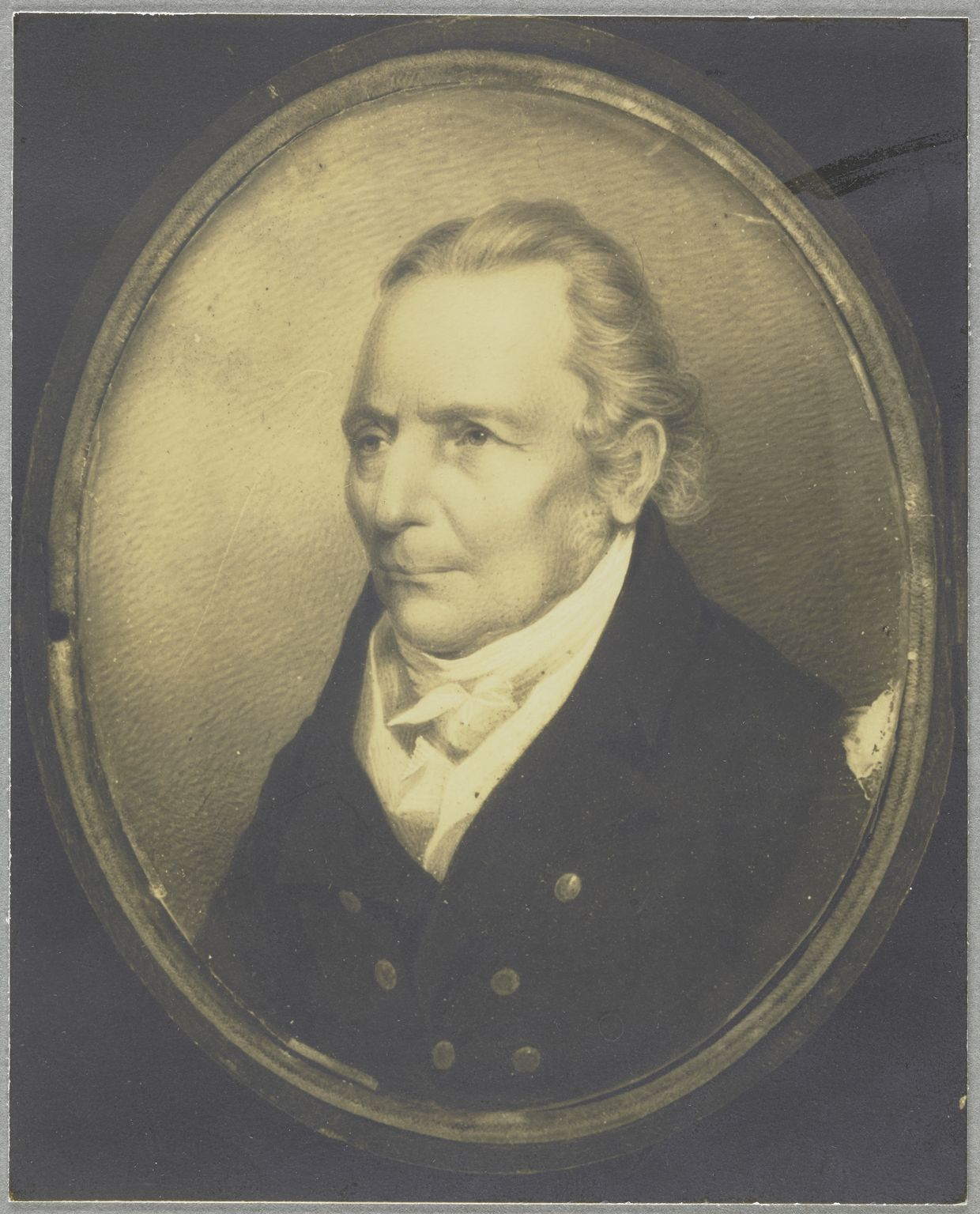
- Painting of Charles Drayton by Charles Fraser, 1802

11th Lieutenant Governor of South Carolina
- In office February 11, 1785 – February 20, 1787
- Governor: William Moultrie
- Preceded by: William Moultrie
- Succeeded by: Thomas Gadsden

Personal details
- Born: December 23, 1743
- Died: August 11, 1820 (aged 76)

Military service
- Allegiance: United States of America
- Branch/service: South Carolina militia Continental Army
- Rank: Captain
- Unit: South Carolina Artillery Regiment
- Battles/wars: American Revolutionary War; Siege of Savannah (1779)

Charles "Carolus" Drayton I (December 23, 1743 – August 11, 1820) was a physician, politician, botanist and planter in Charleston, South Carolina.

== Early life and career ==
Carolus Drayton was the direct descendant of Charlotta Bull Drayton and John Drayton I, founder of Drayton Hall. He was born on the grounds of the Hall in 1743. Drayton studied medicine at the University of Edinburgh, graduating in 1770.

He served as a commissioned captain of the South Carolina Artillery Regiment during the Revolutionary War, later becoming a member of the Society of the Cincinnati. He served two consecutive terms as a state legislator in the South Carolina House of Representatives from 1787 to 1800. One year after acquiring the Drayton Hall plantation from his stepmother, Drayton was elected as Lieutenant-Governor of South Carolina under William Moultrie, serving from 1785 to 1787. In 1788, after serving his first term as the lieutenant governor, he became a delegate to the South Carolina convention to ratify the Constitution.

Drayton was a physician in Charleston, South Carolina. His medical dissertation on poisons was completed under William Robertson at the University of Edinburgh, was published in 1770. He kept several medical journals, documenting treatments, patients, and outcomes. In his medical journal kept from 1777 to 1781, he documents treating several people enslaved by Charles Cotesworth Pinckney and other Charleston elites.

Outside of his career as a physician, he dabbled in botany and composing music. He also managed plantations, like Drayton Hall and Jehossee.

== Family life ==
In 1755, Carolus Drayton was listed as a beneficiary in the will of his grandfather, William Bull. He was one of the heirs of the prominent Drayton family to acquire Drayton Hall, in 1784.

== Death and legacy ==
In his will, he bequeathed Drayton Hall to his son, Charles Drayton II. In the probate inventory following his death in 1820, his properties at the Savannah and Jehossee Island Plantations and the people who he enslaved were valued at $44,896.

Records of his diaries and journals are located in the College of Charleston's Special Collections, with some digitized records available on the Lowcountry Digital Library.
