= South Carolina Comptroller General =

Constitutional officer

Comptroller General of South Carolina
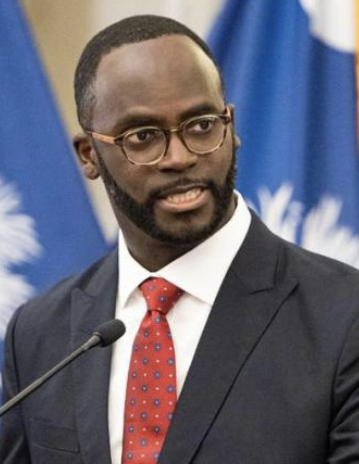
- Incumbent; Brian Gaines since May 12, 2023
- Member of: State Fiscal Accountability Authority
- Seat: Columbia, South Carolina
- Appointer: General election
- Term length: Four years, no limit
- Constituting instrument: Article VI, Section 7, South Carolina Constitution
- Salary: US$151,000 annually
- Website: Official website

The comptroller general of South Carolina is a constitutional officer in the executive branch of the U.S. state of South Carolina. Forty individuals have held the office of comptroller general since 1800. The office has been held by Brian J. Gaines since May 12, 2023, who was appointed by Governor Henry McMaster as a recess appointment following the resignation of Richard Eckstrom on April 30, 2023. McMaster appointed Gaines to avoid a constitutional crisis; since the office was vacant, no person could authorize the distribution of funds.

The South Carolina Code of Laws of 1976, Title 11, Chapter 3 describes the responsibilities of the Office of the Comptroller General.

== History ==
At the turn of the 19th century, the state of South Carolina's finances were marked by confusion, with officials having difficulty in ascertaining its debts. In response, the office of comptroller general was created with Paul Hamilton as the inaugural holder. In 1948, the comptroller general was added to the State Budget and Control Board, a body tasked with helping to craft the state's budget. The body was changed to the State Fiscal Accountability Authority in 2015.

== Election and structure ==
South Carolina is one of twelve states in the country with an elected comptroller. (Note: The other states are California, Connecticut, Florida, Idaho, Illinois, Indiana, Maryland, Nevada, New York, Texas, and Wyoming.) The only qualification for candidates for the office is that they be a registered voter in the state. Comptrollers general serve renewable terms of four years.

The comptroller general's office is housed in the Wade Hampton State Office Building. As of May 31, 2023, the agency is staffed by 27 employees. In the event of a vacancy in the office, the General Assembly is empowered by the constitution to appoint a new incumbent. In the event the assembly is not in session, the governor can fill the vacancy with a recess appointment. The comptroller collects an annual salary of $151,000.

== Powers and duties ==
The comptroller general is one of eight statewide constitutional officers in South Carolina. They serve as the chief accountant and fiscal watchdog of state government. As such, the comptroller general monitors state spending, issues warrants authorizing the payment of funds out of the state treasury, maintains the state's accounting system, establishes internal controls for state agencies, provides financial services to state agencies and local governments, and prepares reports on the financial operations and condition of state government, including the state's annual comprehensive financial report. All payrolls for state employees, vouchers for bills owed by the state, and payments between state agencies are processed by the comptroller general.

The comptroller general is also a member of the State Fiscal Accountability Authority (SFAA), an independent state agency which includes the governor, the state treasurer, and the chairs of the budget committees in the General Assembly. The SFAA is generally charged with oversight of state spending and management of state property. In particular, the SFAA acquires insurance for state agencies and local governments, procures goods and services for the operations of state government, and oversees the construction and maintenance of state buildings. In addition, the SFAA appoints South Carolina's state auditor to serve at pleasure. (Note: The state auditor is a statutory official that functions as the external auditor of state government.)

== List of comptrollers general ==
Comptrollers General
No.	Image	Name	Party	Term	Duration	Sources
1		Paul Hamilton	Democratic-Republican	1800–1804	5 years	
2		Thomas Lee	Democratic-Republican	1804–1817	13 years	
3		George Warren Cross	Democratic-Republican	1817	1 year	
4		Robert Creswell	Democratic-Republican	1817–1819	2 years	
5		John S. Cogdell	Democratic-Republican	1819–1821	3 years	
2		Thomas Lee	Democratic-Republican	1821–1822	1 year	
6		Benjamin T. Elmore	Democratic-Republican	1822–1826	4 years	
7		Alexander Speer	Democratic-Republican	1826–1830	4 years	
8		Thomas Harrison	Nullifier	1830–1834	4 years	
9		William Laval	Democratic	1834–1838	4 years	
10		William Edward Hayne	Democratic	1838–1842	4 years	
9		William Laval	Democratic	1842–1846	4 years	
11		William C. Black	Democratic	1846–1850	4 years	
12		James B. McCully	Democratic	1850–1854	4 years	
13		John D. Ashmore	Democratic	1854–1858	4 years	
14		Thomas J. Pickens	Democratic	1858–1862	4 years	
15		James A. Black	Democratic	1862–1866	4 years	
16		S. L. Leaphart	Independent	1866–1868	2 years	
17		John L. Neagle	Republican	1868–1872	4 years	
18		Solomon L. Hoge	Republican	1872–1874	2 years	
19		Thomas C. Dunn	Republican	1874–1876	2 years	
20		Johnson Hagood	Democratic	1876–1880	4 years	
21		John Bratton	Democratic	1880–1882	2 years	
22		William E. Stoney	Democratic	1880–1886	4 years	
23		John S. Verner	Democratic	1886–1890	4 years	
24		William Haselden Ellerbe	Democratic	1890–1894	4 years	
25		James W. Horton	Democratic	1894–1897	3 years	
26		Layfayette P. Epton	Democratic	1897–1899	2 years	
27		John P. Derham	Democratic	1899–1903	4 years	
28		Adolphus W. Jones	Democratic	1903–1915	12 years	
29		Carlton W. Sawyer	Democratic	1915–1918	3 years	
30		R. Lyles Osborne	Democratic	1918-1920	2 years	
31		Wilbert Sutherland	Democratic	1920–1921	1 year	
32		Walter E. Duncan	Democratic	1921–1925	4 years	
33		A. J. Beattie	Democratic	1925-1943	9 years	
34		Eldridge C. Rhodes	Democratic	1943–1967	18 years	
35		John Henry Mills	Democratic	1967–1976	9 years	
36		Earle Morris	Democratic	1976–1999	23 years	
37		Jim Lander	Democratic	1999–2003	4 years	
38		Richard Eckstrom	Republican	2003–2023	20 years	
39		Brian J. Gaines	Democratic	2023–present	3 years, 133 days	

== Works cited ==
- Comptroller General Fiscal Year 2021–2022 Accountability Report (PDF), Office of the South Carolina Comptroller General, 2022
- Graham, Cole Blease Jr. (2011). The South Carolina State Constitution (revised ed.). Oxford University Press. ISBN 9780199877720.
- Snowden, Yates; Cutler, Howard, eds. (1920). History of South Carolina. Vol. 1. Chicago: Lewis Publishing Company.
