= Thomas Lee (South Carolina judge) =

American judge

Judge of the United States District Court for the District of South Carolina
- In office February 17, 1823 – October 24, 1839
- Appointed by: James Monroe
- Preceded by: John Drayton
- Succeeded by: Robert Budd Gilchrist

2nd Comptroller General of South Carolina
- In office 1804–1817
- Preceded by: Paul Hamilton
- Succeeded by: George Warren Cross
- In office 1821–1822
- Preceded by: John S. Cogdell
- Succeeded by: Benjamin T. Elmore

Personal details
- Born: Thomas Lee; December 1, 1769 Charleston, Province of South Carolina, British America
- Died: October 24, 1839 (aged 69) Charleston, South Carolina, U.S.
- Education: read law

Thomas Lee (December 1, 1769 – October 24, 1839) was a United States district judge of the United States District Court for the District of South Carolina.

== Education and career ==
Born on December 1, 1769, in Charleston, Province of South Carolina, British America, Lee read law to enter the bar in 1790. He was in private practice in Charleston, South Carolina from 1790 to 1791. He was an associate judge on the Court of General Sessions and Common Pleas in Charleston from 1791 to 1792. He was a solicitor for the Southern District of South Carolina from 1792 to 1794, and state solicitor general of South Carolina from 1794 to 1798. He served in the South Carolina House of Representatives from 1796 to 1804, and was the legal cashier of that body in 1798, and its clerk in 1798, 1800 in 1802. He was the state comptroller of South Carolina from 1804 to 1816. He was in private practice in Charleston from 1817 to 1823, briefly serving again in the South Carolina House of Representatives in 1822. He was a president of the Bank of South Carolina from 1817 to 1839.

== Federal judicial service ==
On February 7, 1823, Lee was nominated by President James Monroe to a seat on the United States District Court for the District of South Carolina vacated by Judge John Drayton. Lee was confirmed by the United States Senate on February 17, 1823, and received his commission the same day. Lee served thereafter until his death on October 24, 1839, in Charleston.

== Sources ==
Legal offices
Preceded by John Drayton	Judge of the United States District Court for the District of South Carolina; 1823–1839	Succeeded by Robert Budd Gilchrist
