= Paul Hamilton (politician) =

American politician (1762–1816)

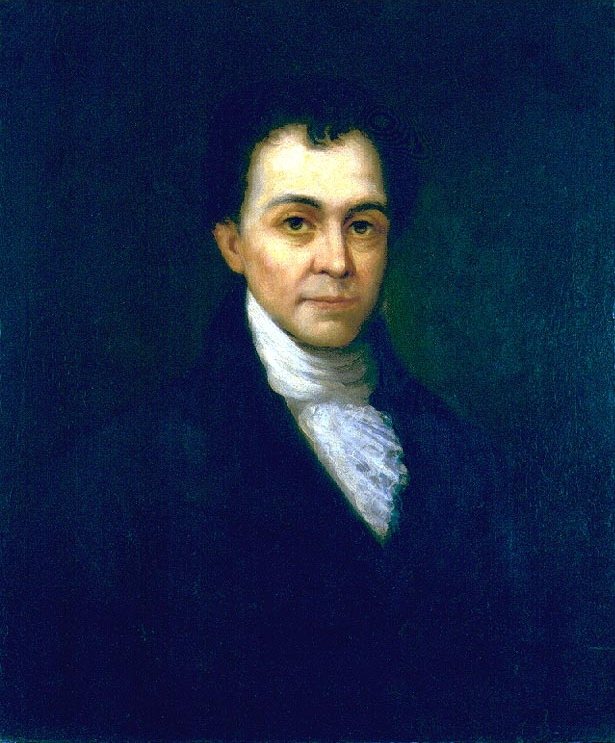

3rd United States Secretary of the Navy
- In office May 15, 1809 – January 1, 1813
- President: James Madison
- Preceded by: Robert Smith
- Succeeded by: William Jones

42nd Governor of South Carolina
- In office December 7, 1804 – December 9, 1806
- Lieutenant: Thomas Sumter
- Preceded by: James Burchill Richardson
- Succeeded by: Charles Pinckney

1st Finance Comptroller of South Carolina
- In office December 21, 1799 – December 7, 1804
- Governor: Edward Rutledge; John Drayton; James Burchill Richardson
- Preceded by: Position established
- Succeeded by: Thomas Lee

Member of the South Carolina Senate
- In office 1794

Member of the South Carolina House of Representatives
- In office 1787

Personal details
- Born: October 16, 1762 Saint Paul's Parish, Hollywood, South Carolina, British America
- Died: June 30, 1816 (aged 53) Beaufort, South Carolina, U.S.
- Resting place: Gray Hill Plantation, Beaufort, South Carolina
- Party: Democratic-Republican
- Spouse: Mary Wilkinson
- Children: 7, including Rebecca Hamilton Waring

Military service
- Allegiance: United States of America
- Branch/service: Continental Army
- Years of service: 1778-1784; 1812-1813
- Rank: Lieutenant (Continental Army); Aide-de-camp (Continental Army); Secretary of Navy (United States Navy)
- Unit: South Carolina Militia; Continental Army
- Battles/wars: American Revolutionary War; Siege of Charleston; Battle of Camden; Capture of Fort Balfour; Siege of Fort Watson; Siege of Fort Motte; Battle of Eutaw Springs; War of 1812

Paul Hamilton (October 16, 1762 – June 30, 1816) was an American politician, military officer, planter, slave owner, and merchant as well as the 3rd United States Secretary of the Navy, from 1809 to 1813. In his time as Secretary, he oversaw the United States entry into the War of 1812. He was also responsible for The Naval Hospitals Act of 1811, an act that saved many lives by creating hospital ships and federal funding to help wounded sailors. He was also close childhood friends with Charles Pinckney (governor). The two of them grew up attending the same schools and also grew up as neighbors.

== Early life ==
=== Early life ===
Paul Hamilton was born 16 October 1782 in Wiltown, St. Paul's Parish, South Carolina to Archibald Hamilton (1736-1766) and Rebecca Branford (1739-1792). His great-grandfather Capt. John Hamilton (1660-1707) was an English immigrant and early settler of South Carolina and his grandfather Paul Hamilton (representative). On October 10, 1782 at age 19, he married Mary Wilkinson, another Old Stock American who was the daughter of Edward Wilkinson, who was also descended British Vice Admiral Benjamin Blake who was a brother of General at Sea Robert Blake (admiral) who was Admiral of the English Navy under Oliver Cromwell. She was also decended from Joseph Morton, a former governor. Together with his wife Mary, Paul Hamilton had 7 children.

== Military service ==
=== American Revolution ===
In 1778, he left school at the age of sixteen due to financial problems. He enrolled in the South Carolina Milita, and was eventually moved up to become an officer in the Continental Army under General Francis Marion. He also saw action under Generals Johann de Kalb, Horatio Gates, and Nathanael Greene. Under some of these Generals, he saw action at the Siege of Charleston, Battle of Camden, and the Siege of Fort Watson.

=== War of 1812 ===
Serving as Secretary of the Navy during the War of 1812, Hamilton ordered all U.S. ships to remain in port for safety, fearing the larger British fleets. Isaac Hull who was commanding the USS Constitution at the time, either did not receive the order in time or disregarded it. This led to the battle USS Constitution vs HMS Guerriere which is a famous battle for the USS Constitution. He was also responsible for The Naval Hospital Act of 1811 which allocated money for the creation of naval hospitals and payment plans for doctors and surgeons to provide long-term care for sick and wounded sailors. This was one of the first federally funded medical systems in U.S. history.

== Political career and later life ==
Election results 1804, South Carolina Gazette, From University Archives

Following the war, he was a planter and public figure. Hamilton served South Carolina in many public offices including State Representative (1787), State Senator (1794), State Finance Comptroller (1800), and the 42nd governor (1804).

In 1809, President James Madison selected Hamilton to become the third Secretary of the Navy. His term in office included the first months of the War of 1812, during which time the small United States Navy achieved several remarkable victories over British warships. Hamilton was a proponent of military preparedness, especially sea fortifications. Although he wanted to strengthen the Navy, he found the Congress hostile and the President indifferent to his ideas. Secretary Hamilton resigned at the end of 1812 following widespread opinion that he was inept and too cautious at his job, instead calling for someone else who would be more suited for the role.

Newspaper clipping showing Morton Waring acting as Paul Hamilton's lawyer

His daughter, Rebecca Hamilton Waring (1786-1871) married Morton A. Waring (1784-1863). Morton A. Waring served as Paul Hamilton's personal family lawyer and private assistant and secretary. Morton Waring went on to have a slave auction business named Jervey, Waring & White which held the largest single slave auction is United States history where 600 enslaved individuals were sold for a 2024 equivalent of $6,791,088. One of the men involved in the auction company with Waring was Alonzo J. White (slave trader). After his political career ended he returned to South Carolina, sank into a deep depression, drank heavily, and died in Beaufort on June 30, 1816.

== Legacy ==
Three Navy destroyers have been named USS Paul Hamilton in his honor along with USS Hamilton and one Liberty ship named SS Paul Hamilton. Also bearing his name is the town of Hamilton, Georgia.

Political offices
Preceded by James Burchill Richardson	Governor of South Carolina; 1804–1806	Succeeded by Charles Pinckney
Government offices
Preceded by Robert Smith	United States Secretary of the Navy; 1809–1812	Succeeded by William Jones
