= Eldred Simkins =

American politician

Member of the U.S. House of Representatives from South Carolina's 6th district
- In office January 24, 1818 – March 3, 1821
- Preceded by: John C. Calhoun
- Succeeded by: George McDuffie

25th Lieutenant Governor of South Carolina
- In office December 10, 1812 – December 10, 1814
- Governor: Joseph Alston
- Preceded by: Samuel Farrow
- Succeeded by: Robert Creswell

Member of the South Carolina Senate
- In office 1810–1812

Member of the South Carolina House of Representatives
- In office 1806

Personal details
- Born: August 30, 1779 Edgefield, South Carolina
- Died: November 17, 1831 (aged 52) Edgefield, South Carolina
- Resting place: Edgefield, South Carolina
- Party: Democratic-Republican
- Education: South Carolina College; Litchfield Law School
- Profession: attorney

Eldred Simkins (August 30, 1779 – November 17, 1831) was a U.S. representative from South Carolina.

Born in Edgefield, South Carolina, Simkins attended Moses Waddel's academy at Willington, Abbeville District, South Carolina, and graduated from South Carolina College (now the University of South Carolina) at Columbia. He attended Litchfield (Connecticut) Law School for three years. He was admitted to the bar in 1805 and commenced practice in Edgefield, South Carolina, in 1806. He served as member of the State house of representatives. He served in the State senate 1810–1812 and then as the 25th lieutenant governor of South Carolina 1812–1814.

Simkins was elected as a Democratic-Republican to the Fifteenth Congress to fill the vacancy caused by the resignation of John C. Calhoun. He was reelected to the Sixteenth Congress and served from January 24, 1818, to March 3, 1821. He served as chairman of the Committee on Public Expenditures (Sixteenth Congress). He declined to be a candidate for renomination. He was again a member of the State house of representatives from 1828 to 1829. He resumed the practice of his profession and also engaged in planting. He died in Edgefield, South Carolina, November 17, 1831. He was interred in Cedar Fields, the family burial ground, near Edgefield, South Carolina.

== Sources ==
- United States Congress. "Eldred Simkins (id: S000414)". Biographical Directory of the United States Congress.

Political offices
| Preceded by Samuel Farrow | Lieutenant Governor of South Carolina; 1812–1814 | Succeeded by Robert Creswell |
U.S. House of Representatives
| Preceded by John C. Calhoun | Member of the U.S. House of Representatives from South Carolina's 6th congressional district 1818–1821 | Succeeded by George McDuffie |
