= Capture of Fort Balfour =

- Part of the American Revolutionary War
- Cite of Fort Balfour marked out on an 1864 map: sourced from University of SC Scholar Commons
Date	April 13, 1781
Location	Fort Balfour, Beaufort County, South Carolina 32°36′18″N 80°54′05″W
Result	Capture of Fort Balfour and its garrison by South Carolina Militia

Belligerents
South Carolina Militia	British Loyalist Fort Garrison

Commanders and leaders
Lt. Col. William Harden: Lt. Paul Hamilton	Col. Nicholas Lechmere (POW): Lt. Col. Fletcher Kelsall (surrendered); Maj. Andrew DeVeaux (surrendered)

Strength
~100 South Carolina Militia	~110 provincial militia

Casualties and losses
2 killed 1 wounded	~110 captured 1 six pounder cannon destroyed

The Capture of Fort Balfour in 1781, Beaufort County, South Carolina, was a small battle in the American Revolutionary War where a detachment of Francis Marion's militia under the command of Lt. Col. William Harden, captured a force at the Loyalist held fort along the Pocotaligo River.

== Background ==
On April 13, a detachment of Francis Marion's army, led by Lt. Col. William Harden, with about 100 men in his militia force, set out to attack the British post at Fort Balfour, commanded by Col. Nicholas Lechmere. The fort overlooked the Pocotaligo River Bridge, halfway between Charlestown and Savannah.

== Brief siege ==
The Patriots arrived and crept into position around the fort. Harden sent Capt. Tarleton Brown with 13 men on horseback to entice the garrison of South Carolina Loyalists out of the fort. Fenwick, Col. Nicholas Lechmere and 7 dragoons were outside the fort visiting an adjacent hospital, were captured. This made Lt. Col. William Kelsall the fort commander. The Loyalists formed for a charge against the Patriots but returned to the fort after they found out that the Patriots would not withdraw from their positions. Next, Harden demanded the fort to surrender, but Kelsall refused.

== Mutiny and Surrender of the Fort ==
A little while later, Harden sent another demand for the fort to surrender, saying that if the fort did not surrender, that no quarters would be given to the Loyalists. Kelsall asked for 20 minutes to consider the request. A mutiny broke out inside the fort and this convinced Kelsall to accept the demands and surrendered the fort. After 2 hours since the surrender demand, the garrison marched out of the fort and was taken prisoner.

== Aftermath ==
After the battle, SC militia went into the fort and threw the forts cannon into the creek. Sources give the loyalists losses as 91 captured. Another states “one colonel, a major, three captains, three lieutenants, 60 privates of the regular garrison, plus a lieutenant and 22 dragoons...” were taken and paroled. The dragoon horses and supplies in the fort were also captured, the supplies being transported from the area during the night or else destroyed. Future United States Secretary of the Navy Paul Hamilton served at this battle as an officer.
