= William Harden =

South Carolina officer and politician

State Senator to the South Carolina Senate
- In office 1782–1785

Member of the South Carolina Provincial Congress
- In office 1775–1776

Personal details
- Born: 8 November 1743 Province of South Carolina
- Died: 25 November 1785 (aged 42) South Carolina, United States
- Party: Patriot (American Revolution)
- Spouse(s): Sarah Reid; Sarah Cussings
- Children: at least 4
- Occupation: Officer; Politician

Military service
- Years of service: 1760s-1781
- Rank: Captain; Lieutenant Colonel; Colonel
- Battles/wars: American Revolutionary War; Southern Theater; Siege of Charleston (POW); Capture of Fort Balfour

Colonel William Harden was an American military officer and politician who served in the American Revolutionary War, notably commanding the Capture of Fort Balfour.

== Early life ==
Harden was born on November 8, 1743, in Prince William’s Parish, South Carolina, the son of William Harden and Mary Eberson. A landed planter, he entered military service in the militia of colonial Granville County, South Carolina and rose to the rank of captain prior to the outbreak of the American Revolutionary War.

== Military Career ==
On June 17, 1775, Harden was elected captain of the Beaufort Volunteer Artillery Company, which was incorporated into the Fourth South Carolina Regiment of the Continental Line in January 1776. He was appointed to command Fort Lyttelton near Beaufort, a post he held until April 1777. In the spring of 1779, Harden was promoted to colonel and given command of the Regiment of Upper Granville County.

In May 1780, Harden was captured during the Siege of Charleston and paroled to his plantation near Beaufort, South Carolina. He soon ignored his parole and began recruiting a partisan force in the Combahee River region. In late 1780, he joined forces under Francis Marion and conducted operations against British forces south of Charleston.

In April 1781, Harden’s troops captured a Loyalist captain and twenty-five men at Four Holes and subsequently forced the surrender of a Loyalist post at Red Hill. His force experienced a setback at Saltketcher Bridge against Colonel Thomas Fenwick but later captured Fort Balfour after negotiating the surrender of Fenwick outside the fort, taking control of the only major British fortification between Charleston and the Savannah River without firing a shot.

Although Harden was recognized for his bravery, his command style drew criticism. Governor John Rutledge described him as “a very worthy brave Man” but not a disciplinarian, allowing his men to “do as they please.” Rutledge later appointed John Barnwell (senator) as brigadier general of the newly created southern militia brigade, leading Harden to resign his commission in November 1781.

== Political Career & Death ==
Harden first served as a member of the South Carolina Provincial Congress between 1775 and 1776. He later served as a State Senator to the South Carolina Senate from 1782, until his death in 1785 at the age of 42.
