= Wade Hampton State Office Building =

- U.S. National Register of Historic Places
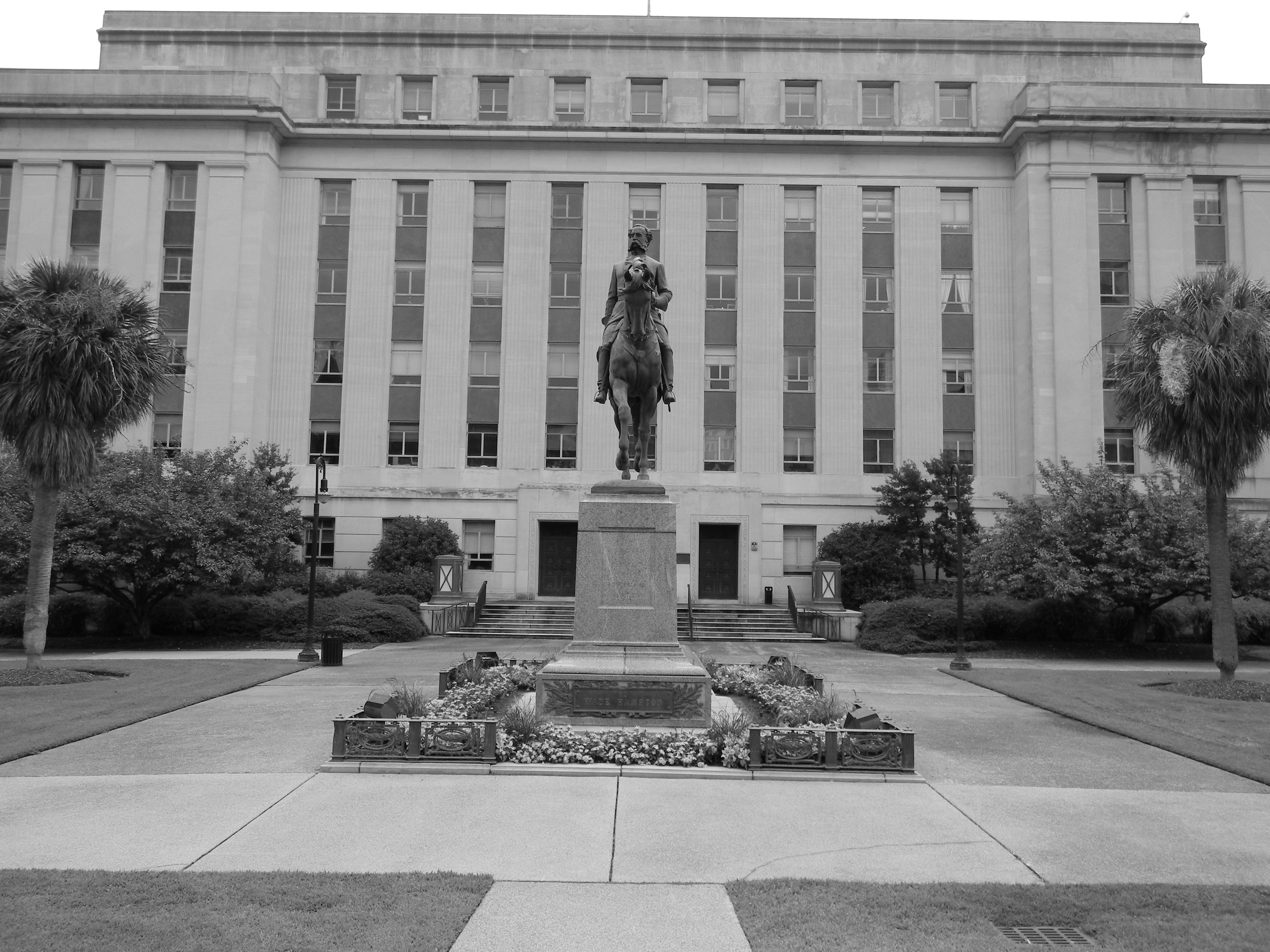

- Location within South Carolina Location within the United States
- Location: 1015 Sumter St., Columbia, South Carolina
- Coordinates: 34°0′5″N 81°1′56″W
- Area: less than one acre
- Built: 1938-1940
- Architect: Lafaye, Lafaye and Fair; Hopkins & Baker
- Architectural style: Classical Revival
- MPS: Segregation in Columbia, South Carolina MPS
- NRHP reference No.: 07000126
- Added to NRHP: March 7, 2007

The Wade Hampton State Office Building is a historic state office building located at Columbia, South Carolina. It was built between 1938 and 1940, and is a large six-story building in a restrained Neoclassical style, with Art Deco inspired details. It held the offices of the Attorney General and the Department of Education, who embodied the state's policy of racial segregation. The building was also designed with segregated spaces for African American patrons conducting business there.

It was added to the National Register of Historic Places in 2007.
