= John D. Ashmore =

American politician (1819–1871)

John Durant Ashmore
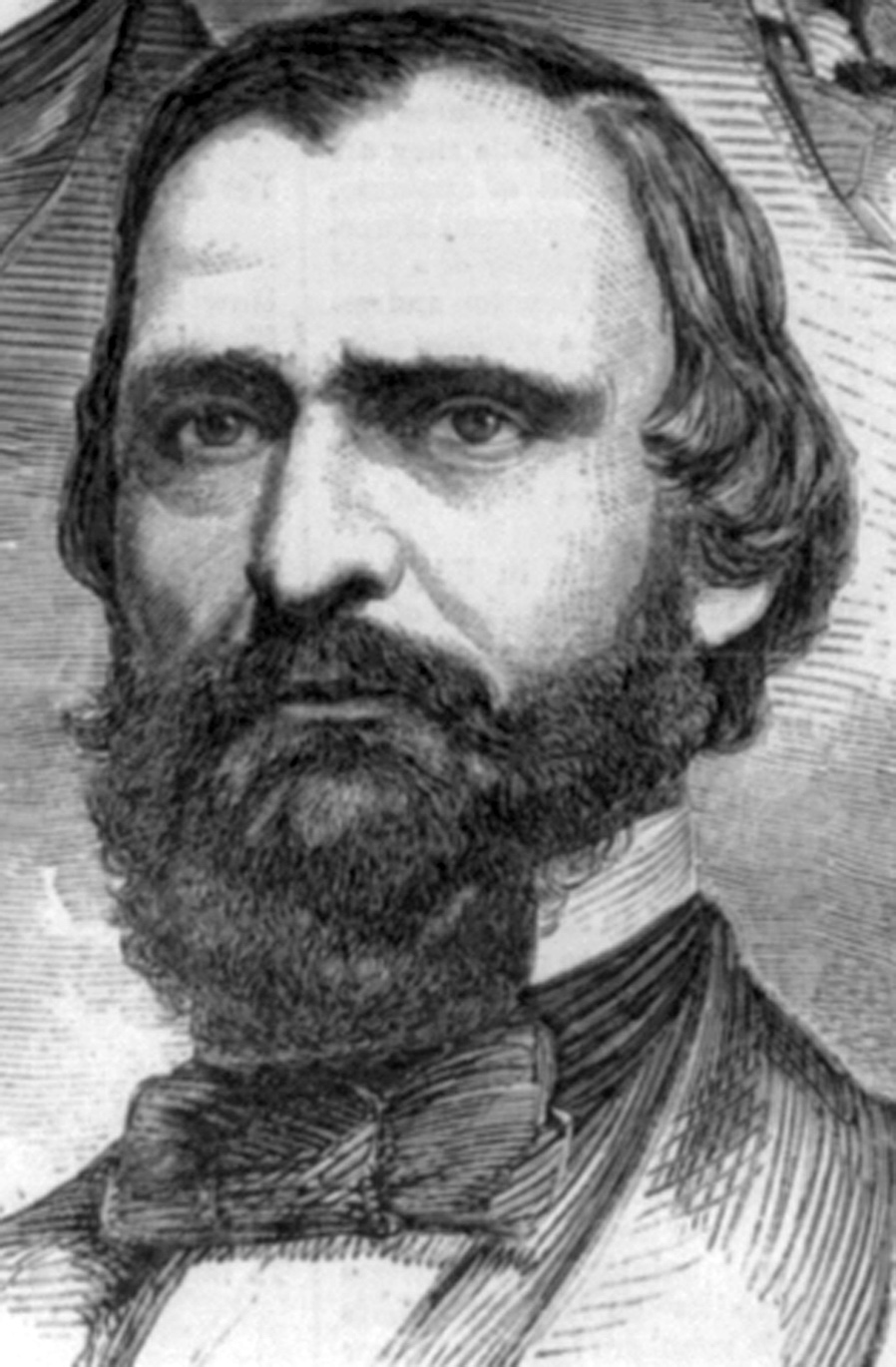

Member of the U.S. House of Representatives from South Carolina's 5th district
- In office March 4, 1859 – December 21, 1860
- Preceded by: James L. Orr
- Succeeded by: District eliminated (Robert Smalls after district re-established in 1875)

13th Comptroller General of South Carolina
- In office 1853 – 1857
- Governor: John Lawrence Manning; James Hopkins Adams; Robert F.W. Allston

Member of the South Carolina House of Representatives
- In office 1848 – 1853

Personal details
- Born: August 18, 1819 Greenville District, South Carolina, US
- Died: December 5, 1871 (aged 52) Sardis, Mississippi, US
- Resting place: Sardis, Mississippi, US
- Party: Democratic
- Profession: planter

John Durant Ashmore (August 18, 1819 – December 5, 1871) was a U.S. representative from South Carolina, and a cousin of Robert T. Ashmore.

== Early life and education ==
Born in Greenville District, South Carolina, Ashmore attended the common schools. He studied law and was admitted to the bar but never practiced. He engaged in agricultural pursuits and owned slaves.

== Political and business career ==
Ashmore served as member of the South Carolina House of Representatives 1848–1853 and as Comptroller General of South Carolina 1853–1857. Ashmore was elected as a Democrat to the Thirty-sixth Congress and served from March 4, 1859, until his resignation on December 21, 1860, upon the attempted secession of South Carolina from the United States of America.

He served as chairman of the Committee on Mileage (Thirty-sixth Congress).

He ran a plantation, but his journals do not record how many slaves he owned.

== Military career ==
During the Civil War, Ashmore was elected colonel of the Fourth South Carolina Regiment, but resigned before the regiment was called into service. After the Civil War, he sought a pardon for having aided in rebellion.

== Death and legacy ==
He died in Sardis, Mississippi, December 5, 1871. He was buried in Black Jack Cemetery, near Sardis, in Panola County, Mississippi.

== Sources ==
- United States Congress. "John D. Ashmore (id: A000316)". Biographical Directory of the United States Congress.

U.S. House of Representatives
Preceded by James L. Orr	Member of the U.S. House of Representatives from South Carolina's 5th congressional district 1859-1860	Succeeded by District eliminated (Robert Smalls after district re-established in 1875)
