= John S. Cogdell =

American sculptor

5th Comptroller General of South Carolina
- In office 1819–1821
- Governor: John Geddes; Thomas Bennett, Jr.
- Preceded by: Robert Creswell
- Succeeded by: Thomas Lee

Personal details
- Party: Democratic-Republican

John Stevens Cogdell was an American sculptor who lived in Charleston, South Carolina, in the first half of the nineteenth century. He was also a lawyer and public official, and was a member of the city's St. Cecilia Society. He served as Comptroller General of South Carolina. In 1827, he was elected into the National Academy of Design as an Honorary Academician.
