= Arroyo =

Arroyo often refers to:

- Arroyo (watercourse), an intermittently dry creek

Arroyo may also refer to:

== Places ==
=== United States ===
- Arroyo, Pennsylvania
- Arroyo, Puerto Rico, a municipality
- Arroyo, West Virginia

=== Spain ===
- Arroyo (Santillana del Mar), a town in Santillana del Mar, Spain

=== Fictional places ===
- Arroyo, a settlement in Fallout 2

== Other ==
- Arroyo (surname)
- Restaurante Arroyo in Mexico City, the world's largest Mexican restaurant
- Arroyo, a fictional village in the computer game Fallout 2
- USS Arroyo (SP-197), a United States Navy patrol boat in commission from 1917 to 1918
- "Arroyo", a song by band SWA

== See also ==
- Aroya (disambiguation)
- Aroyo (disambiguation)
- Arroyo High School (disambiguation)
