= Chellis Baird =

American Multimedia Artist

- Born: Spartanburg, South Carolina
- Education: Rhode Island School of Design
- Known for: Art; Sculpture

Chellis Baird is an American multimedia artist whose practice includes painting, sculpture and textiles. Baird uses the elements of painting by reconstructing handwoven canvases. Each canvas starts with neutral toned materials that are then painted, dyed and sculpted into dimensional brushstrokes. Baird uses color to emphasize each piece.

== Biography ==
Baird was born in 1983 in Spartanburg, South Carolina. She received her BFA in textiles from Rhode Island School of Design and studied studio art at the Art Students League of New York in New York City. Baird previously worked as a designer for renowned fashion labels such as Donna Karan, Ralph Lauren Corporation, and Tuleh. Baird's first cousin is a former member of the South Carolina House of Representatives (January 9, 2019 – November 8, 2020) Con Chellis. Her Uncle Converse Chellis served as Treasurer of South Carolina from 1996 to 2006. Her first cousin once removed is Frank L. Culbertson Jr. an American former naval officer and NASA astronaut.

== Career ==
Baird's first solo museum exhibition, TETHERED was held at the Franklin G. Burroughs-Simeon B. Chapin Art Museum in South Carolina from September 7 - December 19, 2021. The exhibition inspired her to collaborate with Vanna White who is from Myrtle Beach and her yarn collection by Lion Brand Yarns to create a work titled Spin. This work was also included in Galerie Magazine. Baird has also exhibited at notable venues like Nassau County Museum of Art, Chapel of the Good Shepherd (Louise Nevelson), Spartanburg Art Museum and the National Arts Club. In 2022 Baird was awarded a fellowship for visual arts at the National Arts Club, marking a significant milestone in her career. Baird's art is collected by Joan Hornig, Lora Aroyo, Chris Welty and Francis J. Greenberger. She has been featured in publications such as The New York Times, Artnet, ARTnews, Elle, Forbes, Architectural Digest, Luxe Interiors magazine, and Portray magazine. Baird is represented by Slag & RX galleries in New York City and Paris, France.

== Public projects ==
In 2023 in honor of Women's History Month, Baird organized an outdoor exhibition called From the Eyes of Her with NYC Culture Club & Port Authority of New York and New Jersey, New York, NY.
