= 2010 South Carolina elections =

- November 2, 2010

Elections were held in South Carolina on Tuesday, November 2, 2010. Primary elections were held on June 8, 2010, and a run-off election for certain contests was held on June 22, 2010.

== Federal ==
=== United States Senate ===
Republican incumbent Jim DeMint was seeking re-election to the United States Senate, facing Democratic contender Alvin Greene and Green Party candidate Tom Clements.

=== United States House ===
All six of South Carolina's seats in the United States House of Representatives were up for election in 2010.

== State ==
=== Governor ===
Incumbent Republican Governor Mark Sanford was term-limited and unable to seek re-election. Republican Nikki Haley and Democrat Vincent Sheheen, along with third-party candidate Morgan Bruce Reeves, contested the seat. The gubernatorial race was one of the closest in the state, as well as the country, despite the Republican wave on both the state and national level that year. Haley gained national attention as the first non-white and first woman Republican nominee for governor in South Carolina, and for her associations with the national Tea Party and former Alaska Governor Sarah Palin, who endorsed her in the primary. Haley eventually won the race.

=== Lieutenant governor ===
Republican Ken Ard and Democrat Ashley Cooper were the major party nominees for lieutenant governor. Incumbent Andre Bauer decided not to run for re-election in order to run for governor. He came in fourth in the GOP primary. Ard won the general election. A little over a year after being sworn in, he resigned after being indicted for misappropriation of campaign funds for personal expenses.

Ard, a businessman and Florence County Councilman, won a four-way primary after a run-off with Bill Connor, a veteran and attorney in Orangeburg. Other candidates were Larry Richter, a former state judge and former state Senator from Mount Pleasant, and Eleanor Kitzman, former director of the state Department of Insurance.

Republican Lieutenant Governor primary results
Party	Candidate	Votes	%
Republican	Ken Ard	132,602	33.70
Republican	Bill Connor	107,731	27.38
Republican	Larry Richter	95,483	24.26
Republican	Eleanor Kitzman	57,700	14.66
Total votes		393,516	100

Republican Lieutenant Governor primary run-off results
Party	Candidate	Votes	%
Republican	Ken Ard	207,804	61.34
Republican	Bill Connor	130,997	38.66
Total votes		338,801	100

Results by county Ard: 50–60%; 60–70%; 70–80%; Cooper: 50–60%; 60–70%; 70–80%

South Carolina Lieutenant Governor election, 2010
Party	Candidate	Votes	%	±%
Republican	Ken Ard	735,089	55.16%	+5.16%
Democratic	Ashley Cooper	596,620	44.77%	−5.03%
Write-ins		1,012	0.08%	
Majority		138,469	10.39%	+10.09%
Turnout		1,332,721	50.48%	+6.28%
Republican hold		Swing		

=== Secretary of State ===
Republican Mark Hammond ran for re-election as Secretary of State of South Carolina against Democrat Marjorie Johnson, a retired spokeswoman for a Washington, D.C. municipal sanitation corporation. Neither faced primary opposition.

Results by county Hammond: 50–60%; 60–70%; 70–80%; Johnson: 50–60%; 60–70%; 70–80%

South Carolina Secretary of State election, 2010
Party	Candidate	Votes	%	±%
Republican	Mark Hammond (incumbent)	805,783	60.91%	−0.89%
Democratic	Marjorie Johnson	516,414	39.04%	+0.34%
Write-ins		638	0.05%	
Majority		289,369	21.87%	−0.63%
Turnout		1,322,835	50.10%	+6.30%
Republican hold		Swing		

=== Treasurer ===
Republican Curtis Loftis ran unopposed for the office of Treasurer of South Carolina. He defeated acting Treasurer Converse Chellis in the Republican primary. Chellis was appointed to the position by Governor Sanford after his predecessor, Thomas Ravenel, was convicted of possessing cocaine with intent to distribute and resigned. Loftis, the Director of Transparency at the Office of the Comptroller General, received some negative coverage when Chellis ran negative ads attacking him for having been arrested for assaulting his wife. (Loftis was later found not guilty.)

Republican Treasurer primary results
Party	Candidate	Votes	%
Republican	Curtis Loftis	239,296	61.60
Republican	Converse Chellis (incumbent)	149,191	38.40
Total votes		388,487	100

Results by county Loftis: 90–100%

South Carolina Treasurer election, 2010
Party	Candidate	Votes	%	±%
Republican	Curtis Loftis	907,755	98.94%	+46.74%
Write-ins		9,748	1.06%	+0.94%
Majority		898,007	97.88%	+93.48%
Turnout		917,503	34.75%	−9.45%
Republican hold		Swing		

=== Attorney general ===
2010 South Carolina Attorney General election
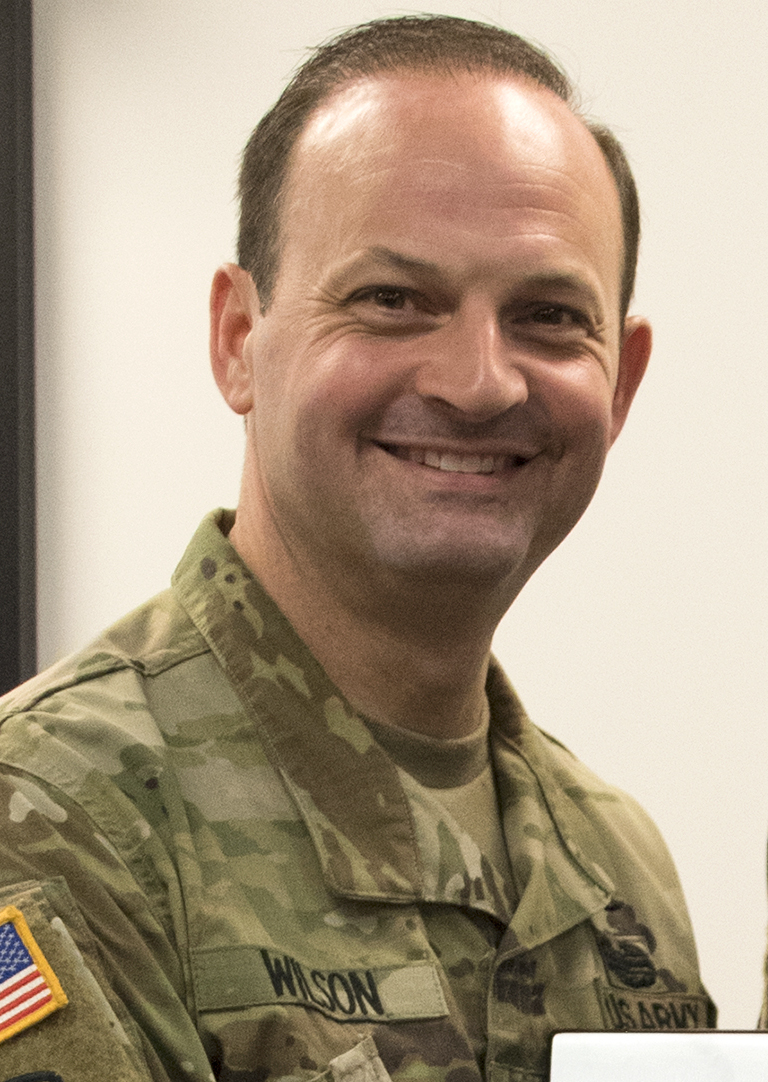

Nominee	Alan Wilson	Matthew Richardson
Party	Republican	Democratic
Popular vote	716,193	589,135
Percentage	53.7%	44.2%
- County results Wilson: 40–50% 50–60% 60–70% 70–80% Richardson: 40–50% 50–60% 60–70% 70–80%
Attorney General before election
Alan Wilson
Republican
Elected Attorney General
Alan Wilson
Republican

Republican Alan Wilson, Democrat Matthew Richardson, and Green Party candidate Leslie Wilson were the nominees for attorney general. Wilson is the son of controversial South Carolina Congressman Joe Wilson. The race was marked by high fundraising totals for both Wilson and Richardson, second only to the governor's race in total money raised and spent in the general election. Wilson eventually won.

In the Republican primary, Wilson faced two other challengers: Columbia attorneys Leighton Lord and Robert Bolchoz. Wilson eventually defeated Leighton Lord in a run-off.

Republican Attorney General primary results
Party	Candidate	Votes	%
Republican	Alan Wilson	150,404	38.94
Republican	Leighton Lord	143,339	37.12
Republican	Robert Bolchoz	92,457	23.94
Total votes		386,200	100

Republican Attorney General primary run-off results
Party	Candidate	Votes	%
Republican	Alan Wilson	205,851	59.79
Republican	Leighton Lord	138,444	40.21
Total votes		344,295	100

South Carolina Attorney General election, 2010
Party	Candidate	Votes	%	±%
Republican	Alan Wilson	716,193	53.74%	−44.66%
Democratic	Matthew Richardson	589,135	44.20%	+44.20%
Green	Leslie Minerd	27,008	2.03%	+2.03%
Write-ins		470	0.04%	
Majority		127,058	9.52%	−88.88%
Turnout		1,332,806	50.48%	+18.48%
Republican hold		Swing		

=== Comptroller General ===
Incumbent Republican Richard Eckstrom ran for re-election against Democratic challenger Robert Barber. Although Eckstrom attracted negative attention over his affair with Kelly Payne, one of the GOP candidates for Superintendent of Education, he eventually won.

In the Republican primary, Eckstrom defeated challenger Mike Meilinger, an accountant and consultant from Greenville.

Republican Comptroller General primary results
Party	Candidate	Votes	%
Republican	Richard Eckstrom (incumbent)	254,714	68.74
Republican	Mike Meilinger	115,813	31.26
Total votes		370,527	100

Results by county Eckstrom: 50–60%; 60–70%; 70–80%; Barber: 50–60%; 60–70%; 70–80%

South Carolina Comptroller General election, 2010
Party	Candidate	Votes	%	±%
Republican	Richard Eckstrom (incumbent)	746,841	56.50%	+3.3%
Democratic	Robert Barber	574,302	43.45%	−3.25%
Write-ins		719	0.05%	
Majority		172,539	13.05%	+6.45%
Turnout		1,321,862	50.07%	+7.37%
Republican hold		Swing		

=== Superintendent of Education ===
Candidates for Superintendent of Education in South Carolina included Republican Mick Zais, Democrat Frank Holleman, and third-party candidates Doretha Bull, Tony Fayyazi, and Tim Moultrie. Zais did little campaigning in the general, despite the relatively high fundraising totals posted by Holleman, a former United States Deputy Secretary of Education and South Carolina State Democratic Party Chairman. The general election race became the third most expensive statewide race in South Carolina in 2010, and one of the higher profile, in part because the perception that the outcome could be as close as it had been in 2006. However, Zais eventually won.

Zais, a retired brigadier general and president of Newberry College, defeated Elizabeth Moffly in the GOP primary run-off. Moffly, a 2006 candidate for the Republican nomination, did surprisingly well considering her low fundraising and poor result in the 2006 contest. Other candidates included: Kelly Payne, an Irmo teacher; Gary Burgess, a former Laurens County school administrator who was arrested in 2009 for soliciting an immoral act; Brent Nelsen, a political science professor at Furman University; and Glenn Price, a Kershaw band teacher. Moffly went on to be elected to the Charleston County School District Board of Trustees in November.

Republican Superintendent of Education primary results
Party	Candidate	Votes	%
Republican	Mick Zais	98,550	26.45
Republican	Elizabeth Moffly	70,392	18.89
Republican	Kelly Payne	65,429	17.56
Republican	Gary Burgess	63,856	17.14
Republican	Brent Nelsen	47,280	12.69
Republican	Glenn Price	27,068	7.27
Total votes		372,575	100

Republican Superintendent of Education primary run-off results
Party	Candidate	Votes	%
Republican	Mick Zais	180,482	54.20
Republican	Elizabeth Moffly	152,486	45.80
Total votes		332,968	100

Holleman defeated college administrator Tom Thompson in the Democratic primary.

Democratic Superintendent of Education primary results
Party	Candidate	Votes	%
Democratic	Frank Holleman	97,626	56.16
Democratic	Tom Thompson	76,203	43.84
Total votes		173,829	100

Results by county Zais: 40–50%; 50–60%; 60–70%; 70–80%; Holleman: 40–50%; 50–60%; 60–70%; 70–80%

South Carolina Superintendent of Education election, 2010
Party	Candidate	Votes	%	±%
Republican	Mick Zais	680,787	51.26%	+3.86%
Democratic	Frank Holleman	572,508	43.11%	−4.39%
Libertarian	Tim Moultrie	35,362	2.66%	+0.86%
Green	Doretha Bull	20,787	1.57%	+0.77%
Independence Party	Tony Fayyazi	18,107	1.36%	−0.34%
Write-ins		513	0.04%	
Majority		108,279	8.15%	+8.14%
Turnout		1,328,064	50.31%	+6.21%
Republican gain from Democratic		Swing		

=== Adjutant General ===
Republican Bob Livingston ran unopposed in the general election and faced no primary opposition.

Results by county Livingston: 90–100%

South Carolina Adjutant General election, 2010
Party	Candidate	Votes	%	±%
Republican	Bob Livingston	900,620	99.25%	+41.15%
Write-ins		6,786	0.75%	+0.74%
Majority		893,834	98.50%	+82.20%
Turnout		907,406	34.37%	−8.93%
Republican hold		Swing		

=== Commissioner of Agriculture ===
Incumbent Republican Hugh Weathers ran for re-election against Democratic challenger Tom Elliott, a former Richland County treasurer and councilman. Neither faced primary opposition. The major issue in the race was the moving of the state farmers' market, which Elliott suggested had been done improperly.

Results by county Weathers: 50–60%; 60–70%; 70–80%; Elliott: 50–60%; 60–70%; 70–80%

South Carolina Commissioner of Agriculture election, 2010
Party	Candidate	Votes	%	±%
Republican	Hugh Weathers (incumbent)	792,260	60.11%	+0.41%
Democratic	Tom Elliott	525,229	39.85%	−0.45%
Write-ins		533	0.04%	
Majority		267,031	20.06%	+1.20%
Turnout		1,318,022	49.92%	+6.52%
Republican hold		Swing		

=== State House of Representatives ===
All 124 seats in the South Carolina House of Representatives were up for election in 2010.

=== Judicial positions ===
Several Probate Court justices were up for election in 2010. Most other judges are elected by the South Carolina General Assembly instead of by the general population.

- South Carolina judicial elections, 2010 at Judgepedia

=== Ballot measures ===
Four measures appeared on the general election ballot.

Amendment 1 amended Article I of the state Constitution to guarantee citizens the right to hunt, fish and trap wildlife, "subject to laws and regulations promoting sound wildlife conservation and management as prescribed by the General Assembly."

Amendment 1 Results by county Yes: 90–100%; 80–90%; 70–80%

Amendment 1
Choice	Votes	%
For	1,126,228	88.97
Against	139,668	11.03
Total	1,265,896	100.00
Registered voters/turnout	2,631,459	48.11
Source: - Official Results

Amendment 2 amended Article II of the state Constitution "to provide that the fundamental right of an individual to vote by secret ballot is guaranteed for a designation, a selection, or an authorization for employee representation by a labor organization."

Amendment 2 Results by county Yes: 80–90%; 70–80%

Amendment 2
Choice	Votes	%
For	1,090,107	86.20
Against	174,473	13.80
Total	1,264,580	100.00
Registered voters/turnout	2,631,459	48.06
Source: - Official Results

Amendment 3 amended Section 36(A) of Article III of the state Constitution "to increase from three to five percent in increments of one-half of one percent over four fiscal years the amount of state general fund revenue in the latest completed fiscal year required to be held in the General Reserve Fund."

Amendment 3 Results by county Yes: 70–80%; 60–70%

Amendment 3
Choice	Votes	%
For	890,015	70.91
Against	365,105	29.09
Total	1,255,120	100.00
Registered voters/turnout	2,631,459	47.70
Source: - Official Results

Amendment 4 amended Section 36(A) of Article III of the state Constitution " to increase from three to five percent in increments of one-half of one percent over four fiscal years the amount of state general fund revenue in the latest completed fiscal year required to be held in the General Reserve Fund and to allow the percentage amount to be subsequently increased or decreased by separate legislative enactment passed by a two-thirds vote of the total membership of the Senate and a two-thirds vote of the total membership of the House of Representatives."

Amendment 4 Results by county Yes: 80–90%; 70–80%; 60–70%

Amendment 4
Choice	Votes	%
For	906,328	72.61
Against	341,893	27.39
Total	1,248,221	100.00
Registered voters/turnout	2,631,459	47.43
Source: - Official Results

== Local ==
Many elections for county and city offices were also held on November 2, 2010.
