= 2026 South Carolina State Comptroller election =

- November 3, 2026
| Nominee | Mike Burkhold | Tiffany Boozer |
| Party | Republican | Democratic |
| Popular vote | 1,047,724 | 963,806 |
| Percentage | 52.1% | 47.9% |
- County results Burkhold: 50–60% 60–70% 70–80% Boozer: 50–60% 60–70% 70–80% Tie: 40–50%
State Comptroller before election
Brian J. Gaines
Democratic
Elected State Comptroller
Mike Burkhold
Republican

The 2026 South Carolina State Comptroller election took place on November 3, 2026, to elect the state comptroller of South Carolina. Incumbent Democratic comptroller Brian J. Gaines was appointed after his predecessor Richard Eckstrom resigned. Gaines declined to run for a full term. Republican Mike Burkhold defeated Democrat Tiffany Boozer in the general election.

== Democratic primary ==
=== Candidates ===
==== Nominee ====
- Tiffany Boozer, certified public accountant

==== Eliminated in primary ====
- Bruce Cole, certified public accountant

==== Declined ====
- Brian J. Gaines, incumbent state comptroller (2023–present)

=== Results ===
Primary results by county: Boozer: 60–70%; 70–80%; 80–90%

Democratic primary results
| Party | Candidate | Votes | % |
|---|---|---|---|
| Democratic | Tiffany Boozer | 261,968 | 74.5 |
| Democratic | Bruce Cole | 89,761 | 25.5 |
| Total votes | | 351,729 | 100.0 |

== Republican primary ==
=== Candidates ===
==== Nominee ====
- Mike Burkhold, businessman and nominee for South Carolina's 5th congressional district in 1998

== General election ==
=== Results ===
2026 South Carolina State Comptroller election
| Party | Candidate | Votes | % | ±% |
|---|---|---|---|---|
| Republican | Mike Burkhold | 1,048,553 | 52.05% | |
| Democratic | Tiffany Boozer | 965,075 | 47.91% | |
| Write-in | | 730 | 0.04% | |
| Total votes | | 2,014,358 | 100.0 | |
| Republican hold | | | | |
