= 2006 South Carolina elections =

- November 7, 2006

The 2006 South Carolina elections took place on November 7, 2006, and included the gubernatorial election. All nine popularly elected constitutional officers were up for reelection, and all races except the attorney general's were contested. The entire South Carolina House of Representatives, one state senator, and six state circuit solicitors were also up for election. Several constitutional amendments were also on the ballot.

Filing for the major parties closed on March 28, 2006, and filing for minor parties closed on August 15. The primaries for both parties were held on June 13, and run-offs were held on June 27. All results are taken from the South Carolina Election Commission's official results. Percentages may not add up to 100 because of rounding.

== Governor ==
Republican primary

- Oscar Lovelace - physician
- Mark Sanford - incumbent governor, former realtor and U.S. representative

Lovelace's candidacy was largely quixotic, although it did garner some interest from disaffected Republicans and Democrats. The Prosperity doctor emphasized working across party lines, health care reform, opposition to school vouchers and job creation. Sanford largely ignored Lovelace's campaign, even refusing to attend a South Carolina Educational Television (SCETV) debate with his opponent. Although Lovelace made a stronger than expected showing in the primary, his loss was not surprising.

Republican gubernatorial primary results
Party	Candidate	Votes	%
Republican	Mark Sanford (incumbent)	160,238	64.8
Republican	Oscar Lovelace	87,043	35.2
Total votes		247,281	100

Democratic primary

- C. Dennis Aughtry - attorney
- Kenneth Lamar Holland (withdrew) - former U.S. representative
- Tommy Moore - state senator from Aiken County and businessman
- Frank Willis - mayor of Florence

Moore obtained the support of much of the state party months in advance, having declared his candidacy early. He ran on a platform that stressed his experience in state government and support for consensus-building politics. Willis largely self-financed his campaign, highlighting his history fighting crime in Florence and bringing economic development to the Pee Dee. Aughtry was a late entrant in the race, and based almost his entire campaign on the idea of legalizing casino gambling in the state to boost revenues. Holland briefly entered the race, but left when it became apparent he could not raise enough money to be an effective candidate. His name was not on the primary ballot. Moore won with an absolute majority, avoiding a run-off.

Democratic gubernatorial primary results, 2006
Party	Candidate	Votes	%
Democratic	Tommy Moore	88,092	63.7
Democratic	Frank Willis	42,317	30.6
Democratic	C. Dennis Aughtry	7,934	5.7
Total votes		138,343	100

General election

Before the general election campaign, major issues in the race were expected to likely be South Carolina's property tax, cigarette tax, and school vouchers. However, the race had surprisingly low visibility, with the only major issue being the governor's combative relationship with the legislature. Job creation and public school investment were minor issues in the campaign. Despite being named one of the worst governors in the country by Time magazine a year before the election and generally being seen as ineffective, Sanford defeated Moore in the general election by ten points.

State Senator Jake Knotts considered mounting an independent candidacy for governor, and collected enough petition signatures to theoretically qualify for the ballot, but decided not to run.

South Carolina gubernatorial election, 2006
Party	Candidate	Votes	%	±%
Republican	Mark Sanford (incumbent)	601,868	55.1%	+2.2%
Democratic	Tommy Moore	489,076	44.8%	−2.2%
No party	Write-ins	1,008	0.1%	
Majority		112,792	10.3%	+4.4%
Turnout		1,091,952	44.5%	−9.6%

== Lieutenant governor ==
2006 South Carolina lieutenant gubernatorial election
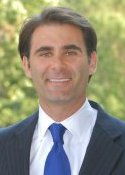

Nominee	André Bauer	Robert Barber
Party	Republican	Democratic
Popular vote	543,414	540,306
Percentage	50.1%	49.8%
- County results Bauer: 50–60% 60–70% Barber: 40–50% 50–60% 60–70% 70–80%
Lieutenant Governor before election
André Bauer
Republican
Elected Lieutenant Governor
André Bauer
Republican

=== Republican primary ===
- André Bauer (incumbent) - former state representative from Lexington County and businessman
- Mike Campbell - son of former Governor Carroll Campbell, businessman
- Henry Jordan - perennial candidate

The Republican primary was expected to be messy and close between Bauer and Campbell, but the former's plane crash and resulting public sympathy late in the race stymied negative campaigning. Campbell relied on a base of support in the Upstate, where support for his father was strong, while Bauer made stops all across the state in a traditional face-to-face campaign. Campbell received an endorsement from former president George H. W. Bush, support that was the basis of one of his television ads. Jordan, a late entrant, went negative against both camps in radio and internet ads, but never gained traction outside of Anderson. No candidate received 50% of the votes in the primary, and thus Campbell and Bauer faced each other in a run-off, which Bauer won.

Republican lieutenant governor primary results
Party	Candidate	Votes	%
Republican	Mike Campbell	111,065	45.4
Republican	André Bauer (incumbent)	89,938	36.8
Republican	Henry Jordan	43,503	17.8
Total votes		244,506	100

Republican lieutenant governor primary run-off results
Party	Candidate	Votes	%
Republican	André Bauer (incumbent)	81,591	51.3
Republican	Mike Campbell	77,567	48.7
Total votes		159,158	100

=== General election ===
The lieutenant governor's race was dominated by the missteps of Bauer, the incumbent. Bauer came under criticism for multiple citations for speeding and his flamboyant personality. His controversial public image, and the fundraising prowess of his opponent, Robert Barber, who did not face a primary, kept the race close in public polling throughout the campaign. In late May, a two-passenger plane which Bauer was piloting crashed in the Upstate. Bauer's ankle was shattered, but otherwise he and the passenger in the plane survived with minimal injuries. The plane crash was later determined to have been caused by faulty bolts in the plane's construction. Barber suffered from his own personal problems when his James Beard Award-winning restaurant, Bowen's Island, burned late in the campaign. Bauer eventually won the general election with less than one percent over the vote after a recount.

South Carolina lieutenant gubernatorial election, 2006
Party	Candidate	Votes	%	±%
Republican	Andre Bauer (incumbent)	543,414	50.1%	−2.6%
Democratic	Robert Barber	540,306	49.8%	+4.0%
No party	Write-ins	1,367	0.1%	
Majority		3,108	0.3%	−10.0%
Turnout		1,085,087	44.2%	−8.9%

== Secretary of state ==
2006 South Carolina Secretary of State election
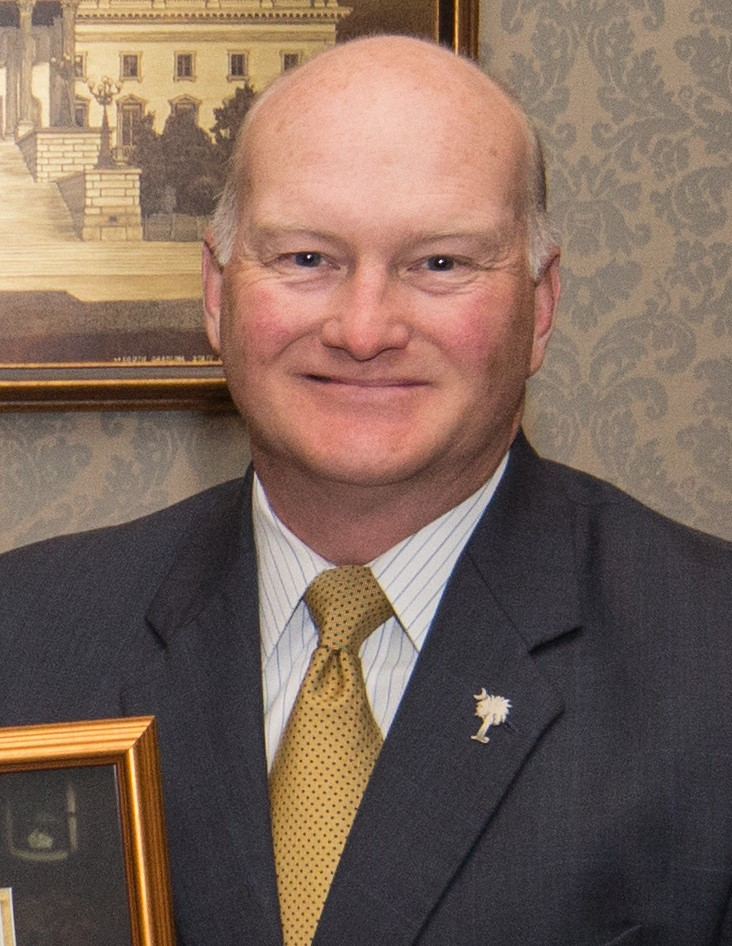

Nominee	Mark Hammond	Cheryl Footman
Party	Republican	Democratic
Popular vote	656,661	415,211
Percentage	61.2%	38.7%
- County results Hammond: 50–60% 60–70% 70–80% Footman: 50–60% 60–70%
Secretary of State before election
Mark Hammond
Republican
Elected Secretary of State
Mark Hammond
Republican

=== Republican primary ===
- L. W. Flynn (withdrew) - 2004 candidate for the State House of Representatives
- Mark Hammond (incumbent)
- Bill McKown - Surfside Beach town councilman

Hammond initially faced little opposition from Flynn and McKown, and far out-fundraised both. However, Flynn withdrew from the race and endorsed McKown, whose campaign picked up traction based on questioning Hammond's conservatism and support for the governor. Hammond eventually defeated McKown. Although Flynn received 6.5% of the vote in the primary, his votes were not officially tallied.

Republican secretary of state primary results
Party	Candidate	Votes	%
Republican	Mark Hammond (incumbent)	125,016	58.8
Republican	Bill McKown	87,744	41.2
Total votes		212,760	100

=== General election ===
Mark Hammond faced Democratic challenger Cheryl Footman, who did not face a primary. In a rather bizarre moment in the race, Footman attempted to burst into patriotic song at the end of her SCETV debate with Hammond, but was quickly cut off by the moderator. Hammond easily won re-election.

South Carolina secretary of state election, 2006
Party	Candidate	Votes	%	±%
Republican	Mark Hammond (incumbent)	656,661	61.2%	+4.4%
Democratic	Cheryl Footman	415,211	38.7%	−4.4%
No party	Write-ins	473	<0.1%	
Majority		241,450	22.5%	+8.8%
Turnout		1,072,345	43.7%	−8.8%

== State treasurer ==
2006 South Carolina State Treasurer election
Nominee	Thomas Ravenel	Grady Patterson
Party	Republican	Democratic
Popular vote	566,540	518,966
Percentage	52.2%	47.8%
- County results Ravenel: 50–60% 60–70% Patterson: 50–60% 60–70% 70–80%
State Treasurer before election
Grady Patterson
Democratic
Elected State Treasurer
Thomas Ravenel
Republican

=== Republican primary ===
- Rick Quinn - former SC House majority leader
- Thomas Ravenel - 2004 Senate Republican primary candidate and businessman
- Greg Ryberg - 2002 treasurer candidate, state senator from Aiken
- Jeff Willis - real estate developer

The Republican treasurer's race was hotly contested. Ryberg and Quinn were initially seen to be the front-runners, and Ryberg, the 2002 Republican nominee, made an early $2 million loan to his campaign. Ultimately, Ravenel defeated his opponents in the primary just short of the necessary 50 percent total to prevent a run-off. Ryberg and Quinn both withdrew from the run-off, citing the need for party unity behind Ravenel. Ravenel easily defeated Willis in the run-off.

Republican treasurer primary results
Party	Candidate	Votes	%
Republican	Thomas Ravenel	115,976	48.2
Republican	Greg Ryberg	62,617	26
Republican	Rick Quinn	45,737	19
Republican	Jeff Willis	16,117	6.7
Total votes		240,447	100

Republican treasurer primary run-off results
Party	Candidate	Votes	%
Republican	Thomas Ravenel	120,124	76.6
Republican	Jeff Willis	36,785	23.4
Total votes		156,909	100

=== General election ===
The treasurer's race pitted Thomas Ravenel, a young millionaire and emerging politician, against Grady Patterson, a nine-term incumbent who did not face primary opposition. The race was largely fought over the state of South Carolina's employee pension fund, with Ravenel taking issue with the state's projected unfunded liability and its failure to invest the fund in equity funds, which he claimed would boost returns. Patterson retorted by pointing out Ravenel's inexperience and accusing Ravenel of using the race as a platform to run against incumbent Senator Lindsey Graham, which Ravenel denied was his intention. Ravenel won the election, but was indicted on June 19, 2007 on cocaine charges and suspended as treasurer.

South Carolina treasurer election, 2006
Party	Candidate	Votes	%	±%
Republican	Thomas Ravenel	566,540	52.2%	+4.5%
Democratic	Grady Patterson (incumbent)	518,966	47.8%	−4.4%
No party	Write-ins	422	<0.1%	
Majority		47,574	4.4%	+0.1%
Turnout		1,085,928	44.2%	−8.5%

== Attorney general ==
The incumbent, Henry McMaster, did not face a primary and ran unopposed in the general election.

South Carolina attorney election, 2006
Party	Candidate	Votes	%	±%
Republican	Henry McMaster	779,453	99.2%	+43.7
No party	Write-ins	6,107	0.8%	+0.7%
Majority		773,346	98.4%	+42.9%
Turnout		785,560	32%	−21%

Results by county McMaster: 90–100%

== Comptroller general ==
2006 South Carolina Comptroller General election
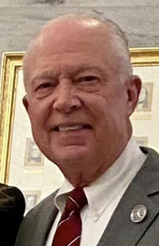

Nominee	Richard Eckstrom	Drew Theodore
Party	Republican	Democratic
Popular vote	571,454	501,122
Percentage	53.2%	46.7%
- County results Eckstrom: 50–60% 60–70% Theodore: 50–60% 60–70%
Comptroller General before election
Richard Eckstrom
Republican
Elected Comptroller General
Richard Eckstrom
Republican

Neither party held a primary for the race. The incumbent, Richard Eckstrom, was challenged by Drew Theodore, businessman and son of former Lieutenant Governor Nick Theodore. The only public issue in the race was incumbent Richard Eckstrom's use of a state-owned car to drive himself to Minnesota a year earlier, and also his use of state funds to refurbish his state offices upon taking office in 2003. The race got some national attention when Saturday Night Live aired a sketch on September 30, lampooning President Bush's low popularity by portraying Eckstrom as the only Republican running for office who was willing to be seen campaigning with the president. Eckstrom eventually won reelection.

South Carolina comptroller general election, 2006
Party	Candidate	Votes	%	±%
Republican	Richard Eckstrom (incumbent)	571,454	53.2%	−1.3%
Democratic	Drew Theodore	501,122	46.7%	+0.1%
No party	Write-ins	373	<0.1%	
Majority		70,332	6.6%	−2.5%
Turnout		1,072,949	43.7%	−8.5%

== Superintendent of education ==
2006 South Carolina Superintendent of Education election
- November 7, 2006

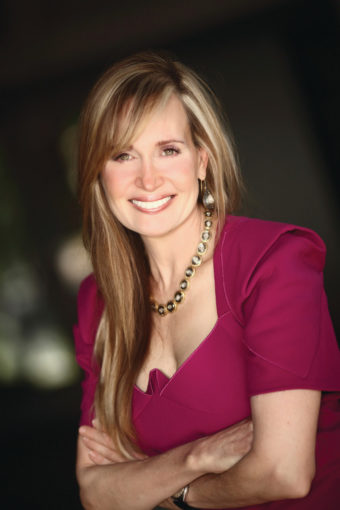
Nominee	Jim Rex	Karen Floyd
Party	Democratic	Republican
Popular vote	513,912	513,457
Percentage	47.50%	47.45%
- Rex: 40–50% 50–60% 60–70% Floyd: 40–50% 50–60% 60–70%
Superintendent of Education before election
Inez Tenenbaum
Democratic
Elected Superintendent of Education
Jim Rex
Democratic

Republican primary

- Karen Floyd - former Spartanburg County County Council chair, attorney
- Elizabeth Moffly - businesswoman
- Mike Ryan - teacher
- Bob Staton - businessman, former chair of the SC Education Oversight Committee
- Kerry Wood (withdrew) - computer programmer

The crowded Republican primary was dominated by Floyd's campaign from the start. Floyd was able to gain the endorsements of the governor, both senators, Republican congressmen and state legislators early in the race, when it was presumed that she would be running against incumbent Inez Tenenbaum. When Tenenbaum announced she would not be running, more serious candidates began eyeing the race, and Bob Staton eventually became the viable alternative to Floyd. His race emphasized an opposition to school vouchers and support for existing aspects of public education. The other, more minor candidates, were largely united in an anti-voucher position. Ryan distinguished himself by straying from attacks on the state's standardized test regime, the PACT, instead supporting the idea of standardized testing as a way to create standards in education. Just before the election, Wood withdrew from the race and endorsed Staton, but despite this, his votes were officially tallied after the race. Floyd won the primary, barely surpassing the 50 percent threshold to avoid a run-off.

Republican superintendent of education primary results
Party	Candidate	Votes	%
Republican	Karen Floyd	120,684	50.5
Republican	Bob Staton	82,777	34.6
Republican	Mike Ryan	17,332	7.3
Republican	Elizabeth Moffly	10,995	4.6
Republican	Kerry Wood	7,156	3
Total votes		238,944	100

Democrats

- Ed Murray (withdrew) - teacher
- Jim Rex - former Columbia College president, former teacher
- Cecil Taliaferro (withdrew) - former COO of Allen University

Although Tenenbaum began preparing for a campaign in 2005, she eventually decided against running, and withdrew from the race. Democrats Cecil Taliaferro and Ed Murray then entered the race. Frank Holleman, Tenenbaum's campaign manager in her 2004 Senate run and former deputy secretary of education, considered a run but did not enter the race. When Rex announced his candidacy, he received wide acclaim from the party, and Taliaferro and Murray withdrew before filing. Tenenbaum, Holleman, Murray and Elizabeth Moffly subsequently endorsed Rex's candidacy.

Third parties

- Arnold E. Karr (Green Party) - correctional educator and union activist
- Tim Moultrie (Libertarian Party) - teacher, 1998 Libertarian gubernatorial candidate
- Ralph Linblad (Constitution Party) - machinist, briefly 2006 Constitution gubernatorial candidate
- Tony Fayyazi (independent) - educator

Tim Moultrie won the nomination of the Libertarian Party at their Lowcountry convention, fending off Rebekah Sutherland, the Libertarian Party's 2004 candidate for US Senate. Karr received the endorsement of the South Carolina AFL-CIO and affiliated unions. His campaign stressed the independence of the superintendent's office from that of the governor, empowerment of public educators, and funding equity for all school districts in the state. He proposed using SC lottery proceeds to subsidize poorer districts until the General Assembly enacted a permanent funding plan. Lindblad pledged to dissolve the SC Department of Education if elected, and eliminate the office of superintendent entirely, claiming that bureaucracy is the biggest impediment to effective education. Fayyazi believed that the state superintendent should be an educator with knowledge of how public education works on the ground.

General election

The superintendent race was one of the more high-profile and competitive races. The incumbent, Inez Tenenbaum, opted not to run for re-election after her defeat in the 2004 Senate election against Jim Demint. Republican Karen Floyd declared her candidacy early and posted strong fundraising numbers, avoiding a run-off in her primary against three opponents. The Democrat, college president Jim Rex, also showed himself to be an apt fundraiser, and gained the financial support of large segments of the education community. Rex eventually won, and Floyd conceded, in a close election that was decided after a recount. This was the last time until 2026 that Democrats won a statewide election in South Carolina.

South Carolina superintendent of education election, 2006
Party	Candidate	Votes	%	±%
Democratic	Jim Rex	513,912	47.5%	−12.2%
Republican	Karen Floyd	513,457	47.4%	+10.1%
Libertarian	Tim Moultrie	19,704	1.8%	−0.3%
Independence Party	Tony Fayyazi	18,905	1.7%	+1.7%
Green	Arnold Karr	8,995	0.8%	+0.8%
Constitution	Ralph Lindblad	6,543	0.6%	−0.5%
No party	Write-ins	494	<0.1%	
Majority		455	<0.1%	−21.9%
Turnout		1,082,504	44.1%	−7.0%

== Adjutant general ==
The adjutant general campaign, the only one of its kind in the nation, was interesting not only for its novelty but also because of the entrance of an Iraq War veteran as a Democratic challenger to the incumbent, Stan Spears, a former businessman. The Democrat, Glenn Lindmann, was critical of the decreasing size of the state's national guard contingent over Spears' time in office, and also wanted to make the position an appointed one instead of an elected one. Spears countered that the size decrease was due to a national policy decision, not a state one, and said the position should remain elected. Spears won re-election.

South Carolina adjutant general election, 2006
Party	Candidate	Votes	%	±%
Republican	Stan Spears (incumbent)	617,871	58.1%	−41.2%
Democratic	Glenn Lindmann	445,078	41.9%	+41.9%
No party	Write-ins	343	<0.1%	−0.6%
Majority		172,793	16.3%	−82.3%
Turnout		1,063,292	43.3%	+7.0%

Results by county Spears: 50–60%; 60–70%; 70–80%; Lindmann: 50–60%; 60–70%

== Commissioner of agriculture ==
2006 South Carolina Commissioner of Agriculture election
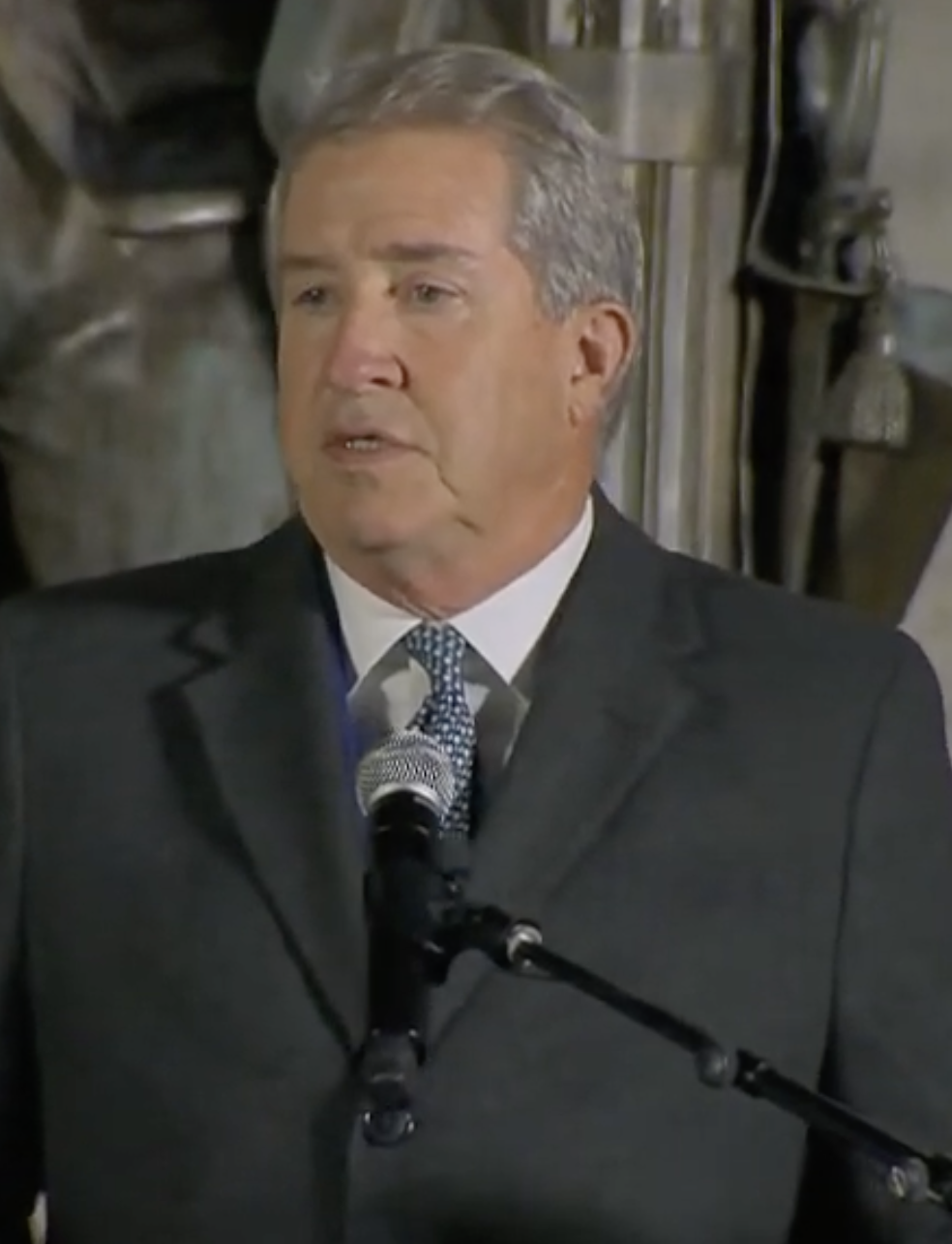

Nominee	Hugh Weathers	Emile DeFelice
Party	Republican	Democratic
Popular vote	635,903	429,255
Percentage	59.7%	40.3%
- County results Weathers: 50–60% 60–70% 70–80% DeFelice: 50–60% 60–70%
Agricultural Commissioner before election
Hugh Weathers
Republican
Elected Agricultural Commissioner
Hugh Weathers
Republican

=== Republican primary ===
- William Bell - farmer, 1994 candidate
- Hugh Weathers (incumbent)

One of the major issues in the Republican primary was whether the commissioner should be elected or appointed. Bell was an advocate for election, while Weathers supported appointment.

Republican commissioner of agriculture primary results
Party	Candidate	Votes	%
Republican	Hugh Weathers	131,061	57.4
Republican	Bill Bell	97,326	42.6
Total votes		228,387	100

General election

The commissioner elected in 2002, Charles Sharp, was convicted in 2004 for accepting bribes from a cockfighting ring to help them avoid prosecution. He lost his office and was replaced by Weathers, the interim commissioner. Weathers was challenged by Democrat Emile DeFelice, an organic hog farmer and State Food Policy Council chairman. DeFelice did not face a primary. DeFelice promoted raising consumption of locally grown foods over food from other states or countries, and adopted an anti-subsidy platform that would limit direct subsidies to South Carolina farmers. Weathers won the general election.

South Carolina commissioner of agriculture election, 2006
Party	Candidate	Votes	%	±%
Republican	Hugh Weathers (incumbent)	635,903	59.7%	+9.2%
Democratic	Emile DeFelice	429,255	40.3%	−9.1%
No party	Write-ins	319	<0.1%	
Majority		206,648	19.4%	+8.5%
Turnout		1,065,477	43.4%	−8.5%

== Constitutional amendments ==
Amendment 1

Amendment 1 added Section 15 Article XVII of the state constitution, denying recognition of any domestic union other than a marriage between one man and one woman in South Carolina and all its political subdivisions. This also abolished common-law marriages and civil unions in the state. The amendment easily passed, although state statute already defined marriage as only between a man and a woman.

Amendment 1
Choice	Votes	%
For	829,360	77.97
Against	234,316	22.03
Total	1,063,676	100.00
Registered voters/turnout		43.3
Source: - Official results

Amendment 1 results by county Yes: 90–100%; 80–90%; 70–80%

Amendments 2A and 2B

These amendments modified Article III. 2A amended Section 9 to allow the State Senate to, at any point, recess for up to 30 days with a simple majority vote, or recess for more than 30 days with a 2/3 majority vote. This basically extended to the Senate the same powers of recess already possessed by the House. 2B deleted a legal prohibition from Section 21 that prevented either legislative body from adjourning for more than three days without the consent of the other. Both easily passed.

Amendment 2A
Choice	Votes	%
For	797,252	78.73
Against	215,402	21.27
Total	1,012,654	100.00
Registered voters/turnout		41.2
Source: - Official results

Amendment 2A results by county Yes: 80–90%; 70–80%; 60–70%

Amendment 2B
Choice	Votes	%
For	762,299	75.97
Against	241,141	24.03
Total	1,003,440	100.00
Registered voters/turnout		40.9
Source: - Official results

Amendment 2B results by county Yes: 80–90%; 70–80%; 60–70%; 50–60%

Amendments 3A and 3B

3A modified Article X, Section 16 to allow state retirement funds to be invested in equity securities. 3B modified the same section, deleting language providing for a State Retirement Systems Investment Panel, an advisory body that oversees the investment of state retirement funds. Both easily passed

Amendment 3A
Choice	Votes	%
For	725,648	71.07
Against	295,398	28.93
Total	1,021,046	100.00
Registered voters/turnout		41.6
Source: - Official results

Amendment 3A results by county Yes: 70–80%; 60–70%; 50–60%

Amendment 3B
Choice	Votes	%
For	660,037	66.54
Against	331,872	33.46
Total	991,909	100.00
Registered voters/turnout		40.4
Source: - Official results

Amendment 3B results by county Yes: 70–80%; 60–70%; 50–60%

Amendment 4

This amended Articles III and X of the constitution, allowing the General Assembly to cap changes in reassessment of property values for tax purposes at 15% over a five-year period. This amendment was part of a tax reform plan introduced by state Republicans during the summer of 2006, that centered around cutting property taxes and replacing them with an increased sales tax. Essentially, this amendment limited increases or decreases in millage to 15% of the property's pre-assessment value.

Amendment 4
Choice	Votes	%
For	707,270	68.98
Against	318,026	31.02
Total	1,025,296	100.00
Registered voters/turnout		41.8
Source: - Official results

Amendment 4 results by county Yes: 70–80%; 60–70%; 50–60%

Amendment 5

Amendment 5 amended Article I, Sections 13 and 17, and Article XIV, Section 5, to limit the circumstances in which local governments can use eminent domain to seize private property. This amendment was part of a national political movement to limit the powers of eminent domain following the famous 2005 Kelo v. City of New London Supreme Court case, in which the Supreme Court backed the power of governments to seize land for the use of private development projects. The amendment prevented governments in South Carolina from doing so, as well as eliminating constitutional clauses that give certain counties slum-clearing and redevelopment power.

Amendment 5
Choice	Votes	%
For	885,683	86.00
Against	144,169	14.00
Total	1,029,852	100.00
Registered voters/turnout		41.9
Source: - Official results

Amendment 5 results by county Yes: 90–100%; 80–90%; 70–80%; 60–70%

== See also ==
- 2006 South Carolina gubernatorial election
