= Thomas H. Pope =

Thomas H. Pope may refer to:

- Thomas H. Pope Jr. (1913–1999), Speaker of the South Carolina House of Representatives
- Thomas H. Pope III (born 1946), his son, a South Carolina state senator
