= Thomas Pope (disambiguation) =

Thomas Pope (1507–1559) was founder of Trinity College, Oxford.

Thomas Pope may also refer to:

- Thomas Pope (actor) (died 1603), comedian and acrobat
- Thomas Pope, 2nd Earl of Downe (1622–1660), English Royalist
- Thomas Pope (Canadian politician) (1825–1863), mayor of Quebec City
- Thomas A. Pope (1894–1989), American Medal of Honor recipient
- Thomas H. Pope Jr. (1913–1999), Speaker of the South Carolina House of Representatives
  - Thomas H. Pope III (born 1946), his son, a South Carolina state senator
- Tom Pope (born 1985), English football player
- Thomas Pope (MP for Gloucester) (died 1400), English politician
- Tommy Pope (born 1979), American stand-up comedian, writer, and actor
- Tommy Pope (politician) (born 1962), American politician in South Carolina
- Thomas Pope (Kentucky politician), member of the Kentucky House of Representatives 1997–1999
