= Senator Landers =

Senator Landers may refer to:

- Franklin Landers (1825–1901), Indiana State Senate
- George M. Landers (1813–1895), Connecticut State Senate

== See also ==
- Jim Lander (1930–2020), South Carolina State Senate
