= Maryland Heights (disambiguation) =

Maryland Heights, Missouri is the name of a city in St. Louis County, Missouri.

Maryland Heights may also refer to:

- Maryland Heights Expressway (Missouri Route 141), in the St. Louis, Missouri, metropolitan area
- Maryland Heights Township, St. Louis County, Missouri
- The southern end of Elk Ridge in Maryland, part of Harpers Ferry National Historical Park

== See also ==
- The Heights School (Maryland), a private elementary school in Potomac, Maryland
- Marland Heights, West Virginia
- Mayland Heights, Calgary
