= Arroyo (surname) =

Arroyo is a Spanish surname. It is a toponym derived from the word arroyo, meaning stream or creek. Notable people with the surname include:

== Arts ==
- Carlos Arroyo (architect) (born 1964), Spanish architect
- Eduardo Arroyo (1937–2018), Spanish painter
- Imna Arroyo (born 1951), Puerto Rican artist
- Joe Arroyo (1955–2011), Colombian musician
- Martina Arroyo (1936–2026), American soprano

== Politics ==
- Carlos Alberto Arroyo del Río (1893–1969), President of Ecuador from 1940 to 1944
- Carmen E. Arroyo (born 1933), the first Puerto Rican and Hispanic woman elected to the New York State Assembly
- Daniel Arroyo (born 1966), congressman and former social development minister of Argentina
- Dato Arroyo (born 1974), member of the Philippine House of Representatives and son of Jose Miguel and Gloria Arroyo
- Eriberto Arroyo Mío (1943–1989), Peruvian politician
- Felix D. Arroyo (born 1948), city councilor in Boston, Massachusetts, from January 2003 to January 2008
- Gloria Macapagal Arroyo (born 1947), former Speaker of the House of Representatives of the Philippines from 2018 to 2019, President of the Philippines from 2001 to 2010, Vice President of the Philippines from 1998 to 2001
- Iggy Arroyo (1950–2012), member of the Philippine House of Representatives and brother of Jose Miguel Arroyo
- Joker Arroyo (1927–2015), Philippine senator
- Jose Miguel Arroyo (born 1945), former First Gentleman of the Philippines and husband of Gloria Arroyo
- Mikey Arroyo (born 1969), son of Jose Miguel and Gloria Arroyo
- Marilou Arroyo-Lesaca, Filipino politician

== Sports ==
- Ángel Arroyo (born 1956), Spanish former cyclist
- Bronson Arroyo (born 1977), American former Major League Baseball pitcher
- Carlos Arroyo (born 1979), Puerto Rican professional basketball player
- Christian Arroyo (born 1995), American Major League Baseball infielder
- David Arroyo (born 1980), Spanish cyclist
- Elijah Arroyo (born 2003), American football player
- Fernando Arroyo (born 1952), American former Major League Baseball pitcher
- Harold Arroyo (born 1961), Puerto Rican former boxer
- Ignacio Arroyo (basketball) (born 2000), Chilean player
- Lenin Arroyo (born 1979), Costa Rican former boxer
- Luis Arroyo (1927–2016), Puerto Rican Major League Baseball relief pitcher
- Natalia Arroyo (born 1986), Spanish footballer and journalist
- Ramón Arroyo (born 1971), Basque athlete diagnosed with multiple sclerosis

== Other ==
- Raymond Arroyo (born 1970), Catholic broadcaster
- Sharon Arroyo (born 1966), American applied mathematician and operations researcher

== See also ==
- Aroyo (disambiguation), includes a list of people with the surname Aroyo
