= W. Greg Ryberg =

American politician

Member of the South Carolina Senate from the 24th district
- In office 1992–2012

Personal details
- Born: October 5, 1946 (age 79) Eau Claire, Wisconsin, U.S.
- Party: Republican
- Spouse: Elizabeth Rose
- Profession: businessman

W. Greg Ryberg (born October 5, 1946) was a Republican member of the South Carolina Senate, representing the 24th District from 1992 until 2012.

Party political offices
Preceded by Richard Eckstrom	Republican nominee for South Carolina Treasurer; 2002	Succeeded by Thomas Ravenel
