= Mike Burkhold =

Comptroller-elect of South Carolina
- Assuming office January 2027
- Governor: Alan Wilson (elect)
- Succeeding: Brian J. Gaines

Personal details
- Born: January 1, 1969 (age 57) Denver, Colorado, U.S.
- Party: Republican
- Education: College of Charleston (BA)

Mike Burkhold (born January 1, 1969) is an American politician who is the Comptroller-elect of South Carolina.

== Political career ==
=== 1998 US House Congressional District Five election ===
Burkhold was the Republican nominee for South Carolina's 5th congressional district in the 1998 election against the incumbent, John Spratt. Spratt defeated Burkhold.

=== 2026 South Carolina Comptroller General election ===
Burkhold was the Republican nominee in the 2026 election for South Carolina Comptroller General. He defeated Tiffany Boozer.

Political offices
Preceded by Brian J. Gaines	South Carolina Comptroller General; Taking office 2027	Elect
