= 2006 South Carolina gubernatorial election =

- November 7, 2006
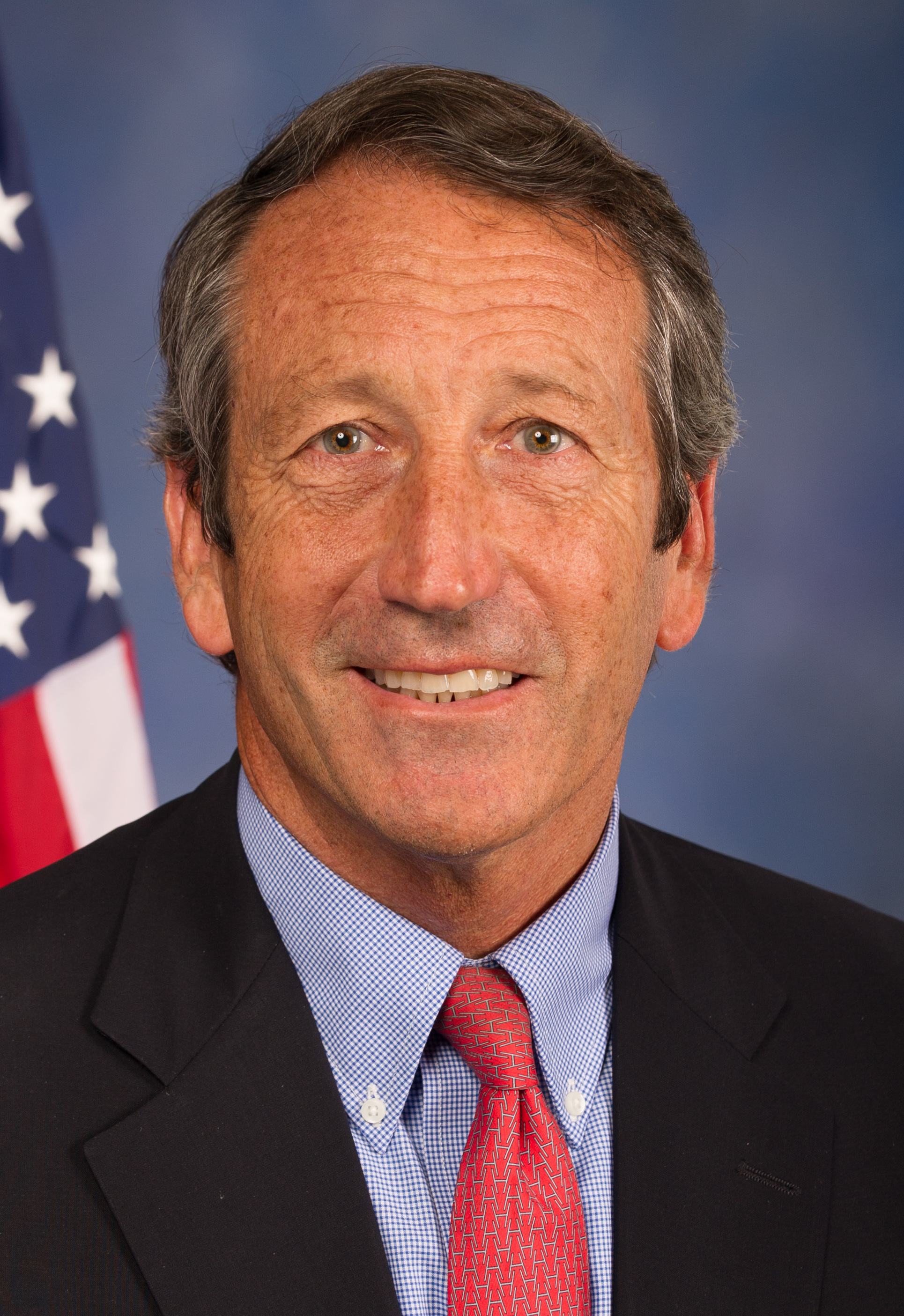

Nominee	Mark Sanford	Tommy Moore
Party	Republican	Democratic
Popular vote	601,868	489,076
Percentage	55.12%	44.79%
- County results Sanford: 50–60% 60–70% Moore: 50–60% 60–70% 70–80%
Governor before election
Mark Sanford
Republican
Elected Governor
Mark Sanford
Republican

The 2006 South Carolina gubernatorial election took place on November 7, 2006. Incumbent Republican Governor Mark Sanford won re-election against Democratic State Senator Tommy Moore, becoming only the third Republican governor in South Carolina to win a second term (Robert Kingston Scott and Carroll A. Campbell Jr. were the others). Sanford started the campaign with a double-digit edge over Moore, and he maintained that lead to election day. During the campaign, Sanford's approval rating averaged in the mid-fifties. In Sanford's re-election victory, he garnered 22% of the African American vote.

== Democratic primary ==
Tommy Moore, a state senator from western South Carolina, emerged with Florence Mayor Frank Willis as the major candidates in the Democratic primary election for governor. Rumors circulated that Superintendent of Education and former U.S. Senate candidate Inez Tenenbaum might enter the race, but she ultimately chose not to run for governor nor seek re-election to her position. Kenneth Holland, a former U.S. representative from the 5th congressional district, briefly entered the race, but dropped out a month later after failing to raise enough financial contributions.

Moore and Willis traded barbs over campaign contributions made by Willis and his wife to prominent Republicans, including President George W. Bush and Senator Lindsey Graham. Attorney C. Dennis Aughtry entered the campaign at the eleventh hour and floated the idea of legalizing casinos statewide to raise money for public schools. Moore garnered more than 50% of the vote in the Democratic primary held on June 13 and thus avoided a runoff election.

Democratic primary results
Party	Candidate	Votes	%
Democratic	Tommy Moore	88,092	63.68
Democratic	Frank Willis	42,317	30.59
Democratic	C. Dennis Aughtry	7,934	5.74
Total votes		138,343	100

== Republican primary ==
Primary results by county: Sanford: 50–60%; 60–70%; 70–80%; 80–90%; Lovelace: 50–60%; 60–70%

Portending a sign of trouble, incumbent Governor Mark Sanford faced a primary challenge from Oscar Lovelace, a physician from the Midlands. When former Governor David Beasley ran for re-election in 1998, he faced a primary challenge and went on to lose the general election to Jim Hodges. Sanford's veto of a heart center for Lexington County and theatrics such as bringing pigs to the Statehouse to show his displeasure of pork barrel spending by the General Assembly angered and annoyed many Republicans. However, Sanford's strategy of avoiding Lovelace and refusal to debate worked as the governor scored a decisive victory in the primary on June 13.

Republican primary results
Party	Candidate	Votes	%
Republican	Mark Sanford (incumbent)	160,238	64.80
Republican	Oscar Lovelace	87,043	35.20
Total votes		247,281	100

== Campaign ==
Governor Mark Sanford proposed three major issues in his campaign for re-election, chief among them being the restructuring of state government. He wanted to reduce the number of statewide elected officials from nine to three and eliminate the state's Budget and Control Board. The governor insisted that these measures would reduce the number of redundant positions and make state government both more efficient and less costly. Sanford's three major issues for the campaign were:

- Restructuring state government
- School choice through tuition tax credits
- Tax cuts and spending restraint

State Senator Tommy Moore ran as a good manager of state government. He held socially conservative and fiscally moderate positions, which put him squarely at odds with the libertarian incumbent. Moore disagreed with what he believed was Sanford's condescending and combative approach of dealing with the General Assembly. The senator also believed that Sanford lacked leadership skills, and that lack of leadership had brought South Carolina to a standstill over the past four years in his view. The main policy proposals that he developed were:

- A rural infrastructure bank to help undeveloped counties
- A governor's office that actively recruits new businesses to the state
- A 30-cent tax increase on cigarettes to offset small business tax credits for employee health insurance

On July 7, several weeks after the primary election, Lexington County State Senator Jake Knotts launched a last-minute effort to place his name on the ballot as a petition candidate for governor. He had feuded with Governor Sanford over a number of issues, including the heart center for Lexington County, and supported Lovelace in the Republican primary. In order to be on the ballot in November, Knotts needed to collect 10,000 signatures of registered voters by July 17, which he failed to do. Knotts's political consultant publicly stated that he could not have raised enough money to have run a successful candidacy.

There were two trains of thought on the effects of a candidacy by Knotts. It was generally believed that had Knotts entered the race, it would have split the Republican vote and helped elect Tommy Moore. However, because those who supported Knotts went on to support Moore, it was also argued that a Knotts candidacy would have in fact deprived Moore of both votes and money.

=== Predictions ===
Source	Ranking	As of
The Cook Political Report	Likely R	November 6, 2006
Sabato's Crystal Ball	Safe R	November 6, 2006
Rothenberg Political Report	Safe R	November 2, 2006
Real Clear Politics	Safe R	November 6, 2006

=== Polling ===
Source	Date	Tommy Moore (D)	Mark Sanford (R)
Survey USA	November 5, 2006	40%	57%
Palmetto Poll	October 26, 2006	31%	58%
Rasmussen	October 25, 2006	34%	57%
Survey USA	October 17, 2006	41%	56%
Survey USA	September 28, 2006	46%	50%
Survey USA	September 20, 2006	41%	54%
Rasmussen	September 10, 2006	38%	51%
Rasmussen	August 4, 2006	38%	47%
Rasmussen	June 23, 2006	39%	51%
Rasmussen	May 10, 2006	33%	52%
Rasmussen	February 17, 2006	36%	49%

=== Results ===
South Carolina gubernatorial election, 2006
Party	Candidate	Votes	%	±%
Republican	Mark Sanford (incumbent)	601,868	55.12%	+2.2%
Democratic	Tommy Moore	489,076	44.79%	−2.2%
Independent	Write-ins	1,008	0.1%	
Majority		112,792	10.3%	+4.4%
Turnout		1,091,952	44.5%	−9.6%
Republican hold				

==== Counties that flipped from Democratic to Republican ====
- Colleton (largest city: Walterboro)
- Lancaster (largest city: Lancaster)
- Darlington (largest city: Hartsville)

==== Counties that flipped from Republican to Democratic ====
- Newberry (largest city: Newberry)
- Saluda (largest city: Saluda)
- Edgefield (largest city: Edgefield)

== See also ==
- 2006 United States gubernatorial elections
- Governor of South Carolina
- List of governors of South Carolina
- South Carolina gubernatorial elections
- 2006 South Carolina state elections
