= Heyward Hutson =

American politician

Member of the South Carolina House of Representatives from the 94th district
- In office 2007–2008
- Preceded by: Converse Chellis
- Succeeded by: Jenny Horne
- In office 1993–1996
- Succeeded by: Converse Chellis

Personal details
- Born: January 24, 1936 (age 90) Summerville, South Carolina, U.S.
- Party: Republican
- Children: 4
- Education: United States Military Academy (BS); Syracuse University (MA)

Military service
- Allegiance: United States
- Branch/service: United States Army
- Years of service: 1958–1985
- Battles/wars: Vietnam War

Heyward Hutson (born January 24, 1936) is an American politician and retired military officer who served in the South Carolina House of Representatives from 1993 to 1996 and again from 2007 to 2008.

== Early life and education ==
Hutson was born in Summerville, South Carolina. He earned a Bachelor of Science degree from the United States Military Academy and a Master of Arts from Syracuse University.

== Career ==
Hutson was a member of the United States Army from 1958 to 1985. During his military service, Hutson served in the Vietnam War and was twice deployed to Europe. After retiring from active duty, Hutson served as an advisor in the United States Department of Defense. Hutson worked as an advisor to the Chief of Staff of the United States Army, and was later selected to serve as policy planning assistant in the Office of the Coordinator of Inter-American Affairs.

In 1992, Hutson was elected to the South Carolina House of Representatives, serving until 1996. He was defeated for re-election by Converse Chellis In 2007, he was re-elected to the House after the resignation of Chellis, who was appointed to serve as the Treasurer of South Carolina. In 2008, Hutson was defeated for election to a full term by Jenny Horne. Since leaving office, Hutson has served as the president of the Summerville Preservation Society.

== Personal life ==
Hutson and his wife, Evelyn, have four children.
