= Earle Morris Jr. =

American politician (1928–2011)

36th Comptroller General of South Carolina
- In office 1976–1999
- Preceded by: J. Henry Mills
- Succeeded by: Jim Lander

81st Lieutenant Governor of South Carolina
- In office 1971–1975
- Governor: John C. West
- Preceded by: John C. West
- Succeeded by: W. Brantley Harvey Jr.

Personal details
- Born: July 14, 1928 Pickens, South Carolina, U.S.
- Died: February 11, 2011 (aged 82)
- Party: Democratic

Earle Elias Morris, Jr. (July 14, 1928; Pickens, South Carolina – February 11, 2011) was an American Democratic politician, who served in both houses of the South Carolina General Assembly.

Morris served as the 81st lieutenant governor of South Carolina 1971–1975, elected on a ticket headed by John C. West, the outgoing lieutenant governor. West and Morris defeated, respectively, the Republicans Albert Watson and James M. Henderson. In 1976, Morris was elected Comptroller General by the General Assembly on June 16, 1976, to fill the unexpired term of outgoing Comptroller General J. Henry Mills; he served in that office from 1976 to 1999.

Morris was a co-founder and director, later chair, of Carolina Investors, a financial company that provided commercial banking services as well as making high-risk loans to people with low credit scores. In the 1990s, the company was taken over by HomeGold, which expanded Carolina Investors' subprime lending. When HomeGold began to lose money, it borrowed from deposits made to Carolina Investors and eventually failed in 2003, resulting in 12,000 people reportedly losing an estimated $278 million. Several corporate officers, including Morris, were sentenced to prison for their roles in the fraud. Morris was convicted on 22 counts of securities fraud, and sentenced to 80 years total; the sentences were concurrent rather than consecutive, so the sentence was de facto four years. He was released in March 2010 due to a terminal illness.

Morris died on February 11, 2011, at the age 82, of prostate cancer.

== Notes ==
Party political offices
Preceded by John C. West	Democratic nominee for Lieutenant Governor of South Carolina; 1970	Succeeded by W. Brantley Harvey Jr.
Preceded by John Henry Mills	Democratic nominee for South Carolina Comptroller General; 1978, 1982, 1986, 1990, 1994	Succeeded by Jim Lander
Political offices
Preceded by John C. West	Lieutenant Governor of South Carolina; 1971–1975	Succeeded by W. Brantley Harvey Jr.
