= Marland Heights, West Virginia =

- Unincorporated community
- Location within West Virginia Location within the United States
- Coordinates: 40°23′54″N 80°36′19″W
- Country: United States
- State: West Virginia
- County: Hancock
- Elevation: 1,083 ft (330 m)
- Time zone: UTC-5 (Eastern (EST))
  - Summer (DST): UTC-4 (EDT)
- GNIS ID: 1555050

Marland Heights is an unincorporated community in Hancock County, West Virginia, United States. Marland Heights was incorporated in 1940, and was named for E. W. Marland, Governor of Oklahoma, who had resided nearby in Arroyo.
