= 1950 South Carolina gubernatorial election =

1950 South Carolina Democratic gubernatorial primary
- July 11, 1950
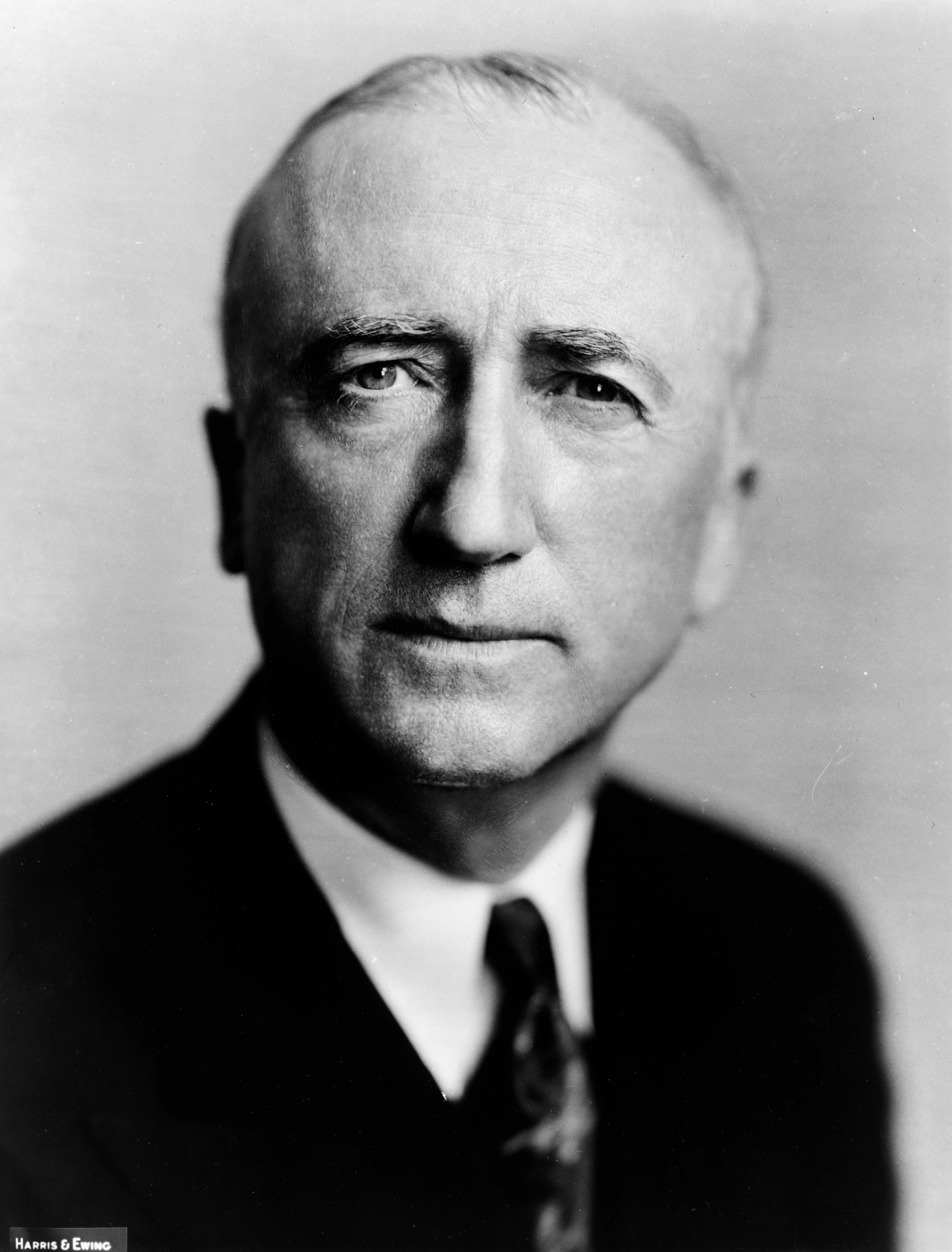

Nominee	James F. Byrnes	Lester L. Bates	Thomas H. Pope Jr.
Party	Democratic	Democratic	Democratic
Popular vote	248,069	63,143	29,622
Percentage	71.63%	18.23%	8.55%
- County results Byrnes: 50–60% 60–70% 70–80% 80–90% Pope: 40–50%
Governor before election
Strom Thurmond
Democratic
Elected Governor
James F. Byrnes
Democratic

The 1950 South Carolina gubernatorial election was held on November 7, 1950, to select the governor of the state of South Carolina. James F. Byrnes won the Democratic primary and ran unopposed in the general election becoming the 104th governor of South Carolina.

== Democratic primary ==
=== Candidates ===
- Lester L. Bates, Columbia insurance executive
- James F. Byrnes, former United States Secretary of State (1945–47), Associate Justice of the United States Supreme Court (1941–42), and United States Senator (1931–41)
- Thomas H. Pope Jr., Speaker of the South Carolina House of Representatives
- Marcus A. Stone

The South Carolina Democratic Party held their primary for governor on July 11. The race was a cakewalk for the popular James F. Byrnes as he faced minimal opposition in the Democratic primary.

Democratic Primary
Candidate	Votes	%
James F. Byrnes	248,069	71.6
Lester L. Bates	63,143	18.2
Thomas H. Pope Jr.	29,622	8.6
Marcus A. Stone	5,495	1.6

== General election ==
The general election was held on November 7, 1950 and James F. Byrnes was elected the next governor of South Carolina without opposition. Being a non-presidential election and few contested races, turnout was much lower than the Democratic primary election.

South Carolina Gubernatorial Election, 1950
Party	Candidate	Votes	%	±%
Democratic	James F. Byrnes	50,633	99.98	0.0
No party	Write-Ins	9	0.02	0.0
Majority		50,624	99.96	0.0
Turnout		50,642		
Democratic hold				

65+% won by Byrnes

== See also ==
- Governor of South Carolina
- List of governors of South Carolina
- South Carolina gubernatorial elections

Preceded by 1946	South Carolina gubernatorial elections	Succeeded by 1954
