= Aroyo =

Aroyo may refer to:

- Aroyo, South Sudan, town
- Lora Aroyo, Dutch computer scientist
- Mira Aroyo (born 1977), Bulgarian musician

== See also ==
- Arroyo (disambiguation)
