= Aroya =

Aroya may refer to:

- Årøya, an island of Finnmark, Norway
- Arøya, a group of islands of Telemark, Norway
- Aroya, Colorado, a small, rural, unincorporated community in Cheyenne County, Colorado
- Arroyo Colorado, a river of Texas
- Aroya, a cruise ship

== See also ==
- Arroyo (disambiguation)
