= Jenny Horne =

American politician (born 1972)

Member of the South Carolina House of Representatives from the 94th district
- In office 2009–2017
- Preceded by: Heyward Hutson
- Succeeded by: Katie Arrington

Personal details
- Born: Jenny Anderson; October 12, 1972 (age 53) Summerville, South Carolina, U.S.
- Party: Republican
- Spouse: Marc F. Horne (m. 1996)
- Children: 2

Jenny Anderson Horne (born October 12, 1972) is an American attorney and politician who served as a member of the South Carolina House of Representatives from 2009 to 2017. She is a Republican.

== Early life and education ==
Jenny Anderson Horne, the daughter of John D. Anderson, Jr. and Cynthia W. Anderson, was born on October 12, 1972, in Dorchester County, South Carolina. She earned a Bachelor of Arts degree in English and Juris Doctor from the University of South Carolina.

== Career ==
Horne is an attorney. A member of the Republican Party, she served as a member of the South Carolina House of Representatives from 2009 until 2017. In a 2015 speech on the South Carolina State House floor, Horne claimed to be a "descendant of Jefferson Davis." Subsequent media reports explained this to be the Confederate States President Jefferson Davis. Horne advocated the quick removal of the Confederate Battle Flag from the grounds of the state capitol.

Reportedly, Rep. Horne never researched her claim of descent from Davis, but was told of it by her grandfather. This was disclosed as her connection to Davis came under scrutiny. In response, Rep. Horne indicated she was not inclined to research the claim.

It was reported in July 2015 that Horne was considering a challenge of U.S. Rep. Mark Sanford for the 1st District congressional seat. During the 2016 primary campaign, Sanford had a significant fund raising advantage.

In the June 2016 debate with Mark Sanford, Horne acknowledged the results of grassroots genealogical researchers findings that she is not descended from the Confederate President Jefferson Davis, born 1808 in Kentucky. Her line goes back to a James Jefferson Davis, born about 1841 in Georgia.

External videos
- Horne's speech on the Confederate flag to the South Carolina House of Representatives, July 8, 2015, C-SPAN

Horne's primary challenge came up short in June, 2016, although she polled stronger than expected with Sanford receiving 56% of the vote to Horne's 44%.

In June 2023, Horne endorsed Tim Scott in the 2024 United States presidential election.

== Personal life ==
Horne's husband, Marc F. Horne, is a realtor. They were married on May 11, 1996. They have two children.
