= Katie Arrington =

American politician

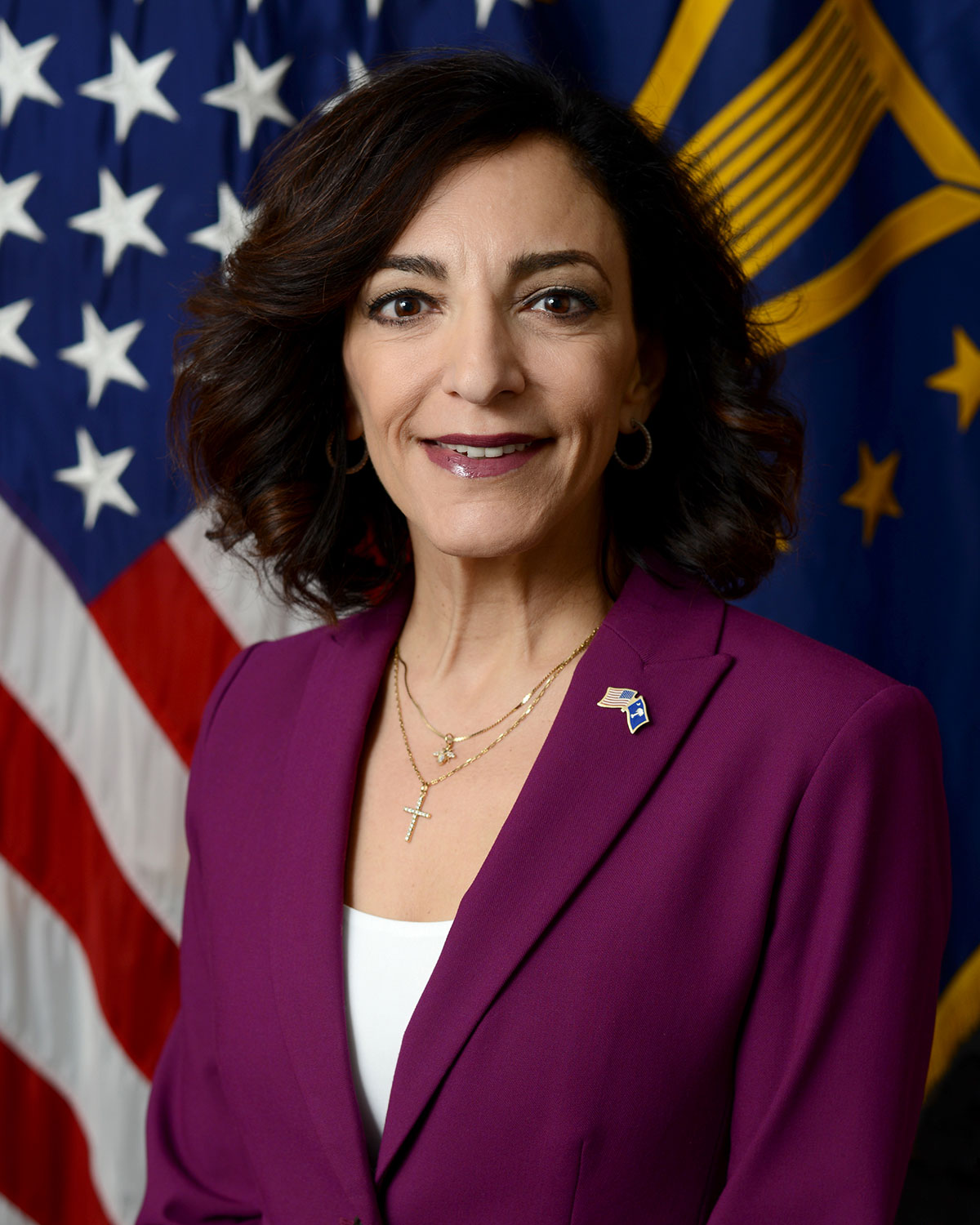
- Official portrait, 2025

Acting Chief Information Officer of the Department of Defense
- In office March 3, 2025 – December 23, 2025
- President: Donald Trump
- Preceded by: Leslie Beavers (Acting)
- Succeeded by: Kirsten Davies

Member of the South Carolina House of Representatives from the 94th district
- In office January 10, 2017 – January 9, 2019
- Preceded by: Jenny Horne
- Succeeded by: Con Chellis

Personal details
- Born: Katherine Elizabeth Stolark; December 6, 1970 (age 55) Fairfax, Virginia, U.S.
- Party: Republican
- Spouse(s): Doug Homrich (m. 1990; div. 2005) Robert Arrington (m. 2010)
- Children: 2
- Education: Canisius College
- Website: Campaign website

Katherine Elizabeth Arrington (née Stolark; born December 6, 1970) is an American politician who was in the South Carolina House of Representatives from the 94th district for a single term, from 2017 to 2019. In 2018, she defeated former South Carolina Governor and incumbent Congressman Mark Sanford in the Republican primary for South Carolina's 1st congressional district but lost to Democrat Joe Cunningham in the general election. In the 2022 Republican primary, she sought to win the nomination again, but was defeated by incumbent representative Nancy Mace.

She was appointed chief information security officer for acquisition for the Office of the Under Secretary of Defense for Acquisition and Sustainment in 2020. She had served acting Chief Information Officer of the Department of Defense from March 2025 to December 2025.

== Early life and education ==
Arrington was born in Fairfax, Virginia. As a child, her family moved to Syracuse, New York. After high school, Arrington attended Canisius College in Buffalo, New York, but left during her sophomore year to marry her first husband, Doug Homrich.

== Career ==
After applying for and receiving food stamps, Arrington and her husband filed for personal bankruptcy in 1995. They are now divorced. After selling a business she started called the Breakfast Club of America, she used the proceeds to begin a career in real estate development. Later, she was hired by a small defense contracting company.

=== 2018 U.S. House campaign ===
Arrington announced she would run for Congress in South Carolina's 1st congressional district, challenging Mark Sanford for his seat in the House in the 2018 election cycle. The Republican primary drew national media attention as it was seen as a test of how independent of President Donald Trump a Republican representative could be. Sanford had repeatedly criticized Trump since he took office. Only four Republican House members voted against Trump's interests more often than Sanford. During the campaign, Arrington ran ads criticizing Sanford for being insufficiently supportive of Trump. Her predecessor in the statehouse, Jenny Horne, had given up her seat to mount an unsuccessful challenge to Sanford in 2016.

During the race, it drew attention that Arrington, who made her pro-Trump views the centerpiece of her campaign, appeared to have been critical of Trump in 2016. In a March 2016 Facebook post, she praised Mitt Romney on the night that he delivered a rebuke of then-candidate Trump, whom Romney called "a phony, a fraud" and someone who was "playing the American public for suckers". Arrington also supported Marco Rubio in the 2016 Republican primary for the presidential nomination.

On the day of the June 12 Republican primary, Trump endorsed Arrington over Sanford, saying she would be "tough on crime," and would "continue our fight for lower taxes."

In June 2018, Arrington defeated Sanford in the Republican primary, earning 50.5% of the vote to Sanford's 46.5%. Arrington became the second person to defeat an incumbent Republican member of Congress in the 2018 election cycle.

In November 2018, Arrington was narrowly defeated in the general election by Democratic nominee Joe Cunningham. While Arrington carried four of the district's five counties, she was defeated in the most populated one, Charleston County, where the majority of the votes were cast.

=== Department of Defense ===
Arrington joined the U.S. Department of Defense in 2019 as a "highly qualified expert" and later competed for and joined the nonpartisan Senior Executive Service. She served as the chief information security officer for acquisition for the Office of the Under Secretary of Defense for Acquisition and Sustainment. The Department placed her on leave and suspended her security clearance in 2021 due to allegations of unauthorized disclosure of classified information from a military intelligence agency and misuse of office.

=== 2022 U.S. House campaign ===
On February 8, 2022, Arrington announced that she would again seek the nomination for South Carolina's 1st congressional district, this time against incumbent Nancy Mace. On February 9, she received the endorsement of former president Donald Trump. A South Carolina Medal of Honor recipient, Retired Maj. Gen. James Livingston, endorsed Arrington. Arrington lost the nomination to Mace.

=== IonQ CIO ===
After leaving her role performing the duties of the chief information officer for the Department of Defense in December 2025, Arrington then took on a new position as CIO at quantum computing company IonQ. Arrington oversees the protection and modernization of IonQ’s global enterprise systems, safeguard digital assets and supply chains, and strengthen operational and cyber resilience across the company’s footprint Shortly before departing government service, Arrington issued a department-wide memorandum directing all components and combatant commands to begin preparing for migration to post-quantum cryptography. The directive cited advances in quantum information science and required defense organizations to inventory cryptographic systems, designate migration leads and plan for the transition away from cryptographic methods vulnerable to future quantum-enabled threats.

== Personal life ==
Arrington was married to United States Army soldier Doug Homrich from 1990 until divorcing in 2005; they have two children. In 2010, she married Robert Arrington, the owner of RLA Associates.

On June 22, 2018, Arrington was seriously injured in an accident when a drunk driver going the wrong way on a highway struck her vehicle. Arrington suffered a back fracture and broken ribs and had to have portions of her small intestine and colon removed.

== Electoral history ==
South Carolina's 1st congressional district, Republican primary results, 2018
Party	Candidate	Votes	%
Republican	Katie Arrington	33,089	50.6
Republican	Mark Sanford (incumbent)	30,428	46.5
Republican	Dimitri Cherny	1,930	2.9
Total votes		65,447	100.0

South Carolina's 1st congressional district, General Election, 2018
Party	Candidate	Votes	%
Democratic	Joe Cunningham	145,455	50.6
Republican	Katie Arrington	141,473	49.2
n/a	Write-ins	505	0.2
Total votes		287,433	100.0
Democratic gain from Republican			

South Carolina's 1st congressional district, Republican primary results, 2022
Party	Candidate	Votes	%
Republican	Nancy Mace (incumbent)	39,955	53.1
Republican	Katie Arrington	34,046	45.3
Republican	Lynz Piper-Loomis	1,220	1.6
Total votes		75,221	100

South Carolina House of Representatives
Preceded by Jenny Horne	Member of the South Carolina House of Representatives from the 94th district 2017–2019	Succeeded by Con Chellis
