= Tommy Moore (politician) =

American politician

Member of the South Carolina Senate from the 44th district
- In office January 1981 – July 7, 2007
- Preceded by: n/a
- Succeeded by: Paul G. Campbell Jr.

Member of the South Carolina House of Representatives from the 84th district
- In office 1979–1980
- Preceded by: Marion D. McGowan
- Succeeded by: William Henry Jones

Personal details
- Born: May 9, 1950 (age 76) Lynwood, South Carolina, U.S.
- Party: Democratic
- Spouse: Dale Moore
- Children: 2
- Education: University of South Carolina Aiken (BA)

Thomas L. Moore (born May 9, 1950 in Lynwood, Aiken County, South Carolina) is a South Carolina businessman and former state politician who is now an executive of a payday lending association in Washington, D.C. Moore was the Democratic nominee for Governor of South Carolina in 2006, but lost to incumbent Republican governor Mark Sanford.

== Early life and career ==
Moore earned his undergraduate degree from University of South Carolina Aiken. In 1971, he married high school sweetheart, Dale. The Moores have two sons — Baylen and Brent — and four grandsons, Luke, Rhett, Spencer, and Bennett.

In 1978, Moore was elected to the South Carolina House of Representatives as a Democrat. That same November, he started Boiler Efficiency Inc., In 1980, after serving only a single term in the House, Moore was elected to the South Carolina Senate and was re-elected continuously until his resignation on July 7, 2007.

== Senate career ==
In the South Carolina senate, Moore represented Aiken, Edgefield, Saluda and McCormick counties, a seat once held by Strom Thurmond. Moore’s committee assignments included the Judiciary; Labor, Commerce, and Industry; Ethics; Rules; Medical Affairs; and Fish, Game, and Forestry. Moore also served as the chair of the state regulation of public utilities review committee, senate medical affairs committee and the joint legislative committee on children and families.

In 1994, Moore unsuccessfully ran for Congressman Butler Derrick's newly vacated seat in the U.S. House of Representatives. Like many "Republican Revolution" races that year, South Carolina's Third Congressional District was eventually won in the general election by a Republican, future U.S. senator Lindsey Graham.

== 2006 campaign ==
Moore won his party's gubernatorial primary with a solid 64% of the vote on June 13, 2006. He defeated both Florence Mayor Frank E. Willis, who ran to the political left of Moore, and Columbia attorney C. Dennis Aughtry.

Moore had a reputation in South Carolina political circles for being a pro-business, right-of-center Democrat, who was conservative on social issues (such as abortion and gay rights), but moderate-to-liberal on fiscal and economic matters (such as taxes and public education). These positions put the Aiken senator squarely at odds with the incumbent Mark Sanford, who had pushed for lower taxes and school vouchers.

Moore was endorsed by prominent Democrats like former South Carolina governors Richard Riley and Jim Hodges. Moore was also endorsed by several influential Republicans, such as fellow senators Jake Knotts and Verne Smith, who seemed to represent the Republican Party establishment's sense of dissatisfaction with the more libertarian Governor Sanford. Ultimately, though, Moore lost the election by a ten point margin, 55% to 45%.

== Senate resignation ==
In a move that sparked some controversy, Moore resigned from the South Carolina senate on July 7, 2007 after being hired as an executive vice president for the Community Financial Services Association of America, a national payday lending trade association in Washington, D.C. Moore continued as president and CEO of Boiler Efficiency, Inc. He was succeeded by A. Shane Massey.

== See also ==
- U.S. gubernatorial elections, 2006
- Governor of South Carolina
- List of governors of South Carolina
- South Carolina gubernatorial elections

Party political offices
| Preceded by Jim Hodges | Democratic nominee for Governor of South Carolina; 2006 | Succeeded by Vincent Sheheen |
