= USS Arroyo =

U.S. Navy patrol vessel (1917–1918)

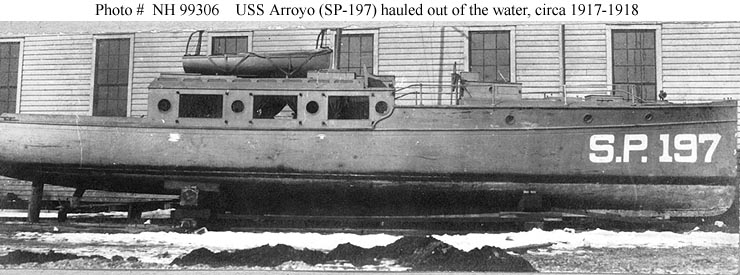
- USS Arroyo hauled out of the water, ca. 1917-1918.

History

United States
- Name: USS Arroyo
- Namesake: Arroyo, a Spanish word for creek which may also be applied to a small, frequently dry gully or channel carved by water (previous name retained)
- Builder: Luders Marine Construction Company, Stamford, Connecticut
- Completed: 1913
- Acquired: 21 April 1917
- Commissioned: 25 June 1917
- Decommissioned: 2 January 1918
- Recommissioned: 18 April 1918
- Decommissioned: 16 December 1918
- Stricken: 16 December 1918
- Fate: Returned to owner 16 December 1918
- Notes: Built as civilian motorboat Arroyo

General characteristics
- Type: Patrol vessel
- Displacement: 12 tons
- Length: 48 ft 6 in (14.78 m)
- Beam: 9 ft 5 in (2.87 m)
- Draft: 3 ft 7 in (1.09 m) mean
- Speed: 11 knots
- Complement: 9
- Armament: 1 × machine gun

USS Arroyo (SP-197) was a U.S. Navy patrol vessel in commission from 1917 to 1918.

Arroyo was built as a civilian motorboat of the same name in 1913 by the Luders Marine Construction Company at Stamford, Connecticut. The U.S. Navy leased her for one dollar from her owner, Mr. A. M. Huntington, on 21 April 1917 for World War I service as a patrol vessel. She was commissioned as USS Arroyo (SP-197) at the New York Navy Yard at Brooklyn, New York, on 25 June 1917.

Arroyo was assigned to the Naval Coast Defense Reserve of the 3rd Naval District and attached to the radio office at the New York Navy Yard. She was laid up at the Marine Basin, New York, on 2 January 1918.

Arroyo was recommissioned on 18 April 1918. She departed New York City on 31 May 1918 bound for the Great Lakes. There she worked with the section patrol, operating out of Detroit and St. Clair, Michigan.

Arroyo returned to New York City just after the armistice with Germany of 11 November 1918 that ended World War I. On 16 December 1918, she was decommissioned and returned to her owner. Her name was stricken from the Navy Directory that same day.
