= Eriberto Arroyo Mío =

Peruvian politician (1943–1989)

Eriberto Arroyo Mío (October 5, 1943, in Olmos, Lambayeque – April 27, 1989, in Chaclacayo, Lima) was a Peruvian politician.

== Early life and education ==
Eriberto Arroyo Mío was the son of José de los Santos Arroyo and Mercedes Mío Timana. He married Crelia Mercedes Burgos. He studied at the Tax School of Tambogrande and the Instituto Nacional Agropecuario of Piura. He studied agronomy at university, graduating in 1967.

== Activism and politics ==
Arroyo Mío had become politically active in 1964. He was a prominent leader of the Piura University Students Federation. He was one of the key founders of the United Left (IU) front in 1980. He served as chairman of IU in Piura until August 1985. In 1984 he co-founded the Mariateguist Unified Party (PUM). He was elected to the Congress of the Republic in the 1985 elections, as IU representative from Piura.

== Assassination ==
Arroyo Mío was assassinated on 27 April 1989 in Chaclacayo, Lima Province, whilst driving his son to school. The murders of Arroyo Mío and Pablo Norberto Li Ormeño, an American Popular Revolutionary Alliance parliamentarian assassinated nine days later, caused a public outcry. The scandal led to the resignation of Armando Villanueva del Campo, who served as both Prime Minister and Interior Minister.

Following demands from IU the Congress of the Republic set up a fact-finding commission to investigate the murders and activities of pro-government paramilitaries. The identity of the culprits of the assassination remains unknown, there was speculation that either government paramilitaries or the Sendero Luminoso could have been involved. In January 1990 Peruvian police arrested eleven alleged Senderistas for the murder of Arroyo Mío, but Sendero Luminoso rejected the accusations and there were widespread doubts that the movement had carried out the attack.

The modus operandi of the killing points to the pro-government paramilitary group Comando Rodrigo Franco.
