= Brian J. Gaines =

American politician (born 1982)

Brian Gaines
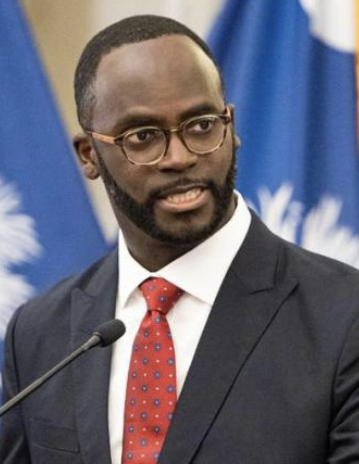
- Gaines in 2023

39th Comptroller General of South Carolina
- Incumbent
- Assumed office May 12, 2023
- Governor: Henry McMaster
- Preceded by: Richard Eckstrom
- Succeeded by: Mike Burkhold (elect)

Personal details
- Born: Brian Jerome Gaines; January 27, 1982 (age 44) Barnwell, South Carolina, U.S.
- Education: University of South Carolina (BA, MPA)

Brian Jerome Gaines (born January 27, 1982) is an American civil servant and politician who currently serves as the Comptroller General of South Carolina. He was appointed by Republican Governor Henry McMaster on May 12, 2023, by recess appointment, following the resignation of Richard Eckstrom. He is South Carolina's first Black constitutional officer since the Reconstruction era.

== Early life, education and career ==
From Barnwell, Gaines graduated from the University of South Carolina with a bachelors of arts in political science in 2004 and with a masters in public administration in 2006. Upon his graduation, Gaines worked for the state of South Carolina as a human-resources consultant and later as a budget-research coordinator. He became a Certified Public Manager in 2014.

== Political career ==
Gaines served as the State of South Carolina director of policy and public affairs, deputy state budget director, and budget director for the state's Department of Administration.

=== Comptroller general ===
Richard Eckstrom, who held the office of comptroller general for 20 years, resigned on April 30, 2023, after a $3.5 billion accounting error. Governor Henry McMaster appointed Gaines to the vacant seat on May 12, 2023. Because the state legislature's session ended on May 11, Gaines's May 12 appointment was a recess appointment, not subject to approval from the legislature, but subject to replacement by the legislature.

Gaines' appointment received bipartisan support in the solidly Republican state, with state Senator Larry Grooms, a Berkeley County Republican, stating he met his call for "a highly qualified seasoned professional with great knowledge of government accounting." Governor McMaster stated, "He's qualified. He's respected by everyone. He has enormous experience. He's not a political person, and everyone we discussed this with has great respect and confidence in Mr. Gaines." The South Carolina Democratic Party and its former chair Trav Robertson, released separate statements on Twitter about the Gaines appointment. While some media outlets reported that Gaines had voted in Democratic primaries in 2016, 2018 and 2022; the Legislative Manual lists him as a Republican.

=== 2026 Comptroller general election ===
Gaines would hold the position until either the General Assembly or general election voters choose a new comptroller. (Note: Gaines is not the "acting" comptroller general. Rather, he was appointed to serve in the position until the General Assembly elects a successor (as is constitutionally required).) With Gaines statement that he did not wish to run for the office in 2026, Republican Mike Burkhold filed for and won the general election and will succeed Gaines.

== Notes ==
Political offices
Preceded by Ronnie Head; Acting	Comptroller General of South Carolina; 2023–present	Incumbent
