= Gil Gatch =

American attorney, politician, and pastor

Member of the South Carolina House of Representatives from the 94th district
- Incumbent
- Assumed office November 9, 2020
- Preceded by: Con Chellis

Personal details
- Born: June 18, 1981 (age 45) Summerville, South Carolina, U.S.
- Party: Republican
- Education: Southern Evangelical Seminary (BA); Georgetown University (JD)

Gil Gatch (born June 18, 1981) is an American attorney, politician, and former pastor serving as a member of the South Carolina House of Representatives from the 94th district. Gatch assumed office on November 9, 2020, succeeding Con Chellis.

== Early life and education ==
Gatch was born and raised in Summerville, South Carolina. Gatch graduated from Summerville High School, where he played on the football team. He earned a Bachelor of Arts degree from the Southern Evangelical Seminary and a Juris Doctor from the Georgetown University Law Center.

== Career ==
After earning his undergraduate degree, Gatch worked as a pastor for seven years. During law school at Georgetown University, Gatch worked as an intern at The Heritage Foundation and for Judge Richard Gergel. In February 2020, he established his own law firm. After incumbent representative Con Chellis declined to seek re-election to the South Carolina House of Representatives, Gatch declared his candidacy to succeed him. He defeated Evan Guthrie in the Republican primary and Democratic nominee Patricia Cannon in the November general election.
