= South Carolina Treasurer =

Constitutional officer

Treasurer of South Carolina
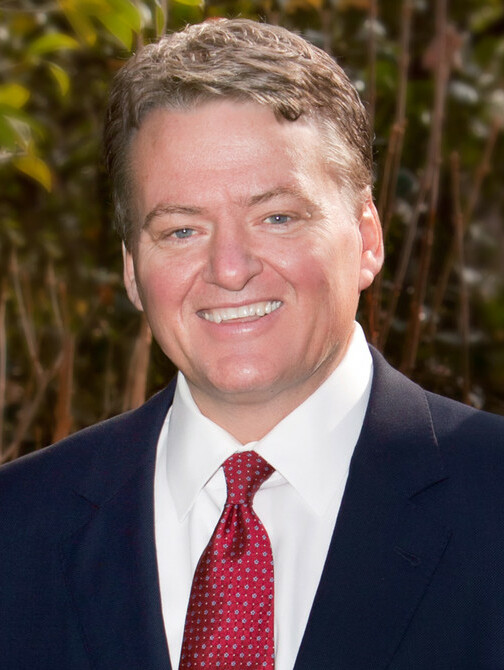
- Incumbent; Curtis Loftis since January 12, 2011
- Member of: State Fiscal Accountability Authority
- Seat: Columbia, South Carolina; Wade Hampton Building; 1200 Senate Street, 5th Floor
- Appointer: General election
- Term length: Four years, no limit
- Constituting instrument: Article VI, Section 7, South Carolina Constitution
- Salary: US$164,000 annually
- Website: Official website

The state treasurer of South Carolina is a constitutional officer in the executive branch of the U.S. state of South Carolina. Twenty one individuals have held the office of state treasurer since it became an elective position in 1865. The incumbent is Curtis Loftis, a Republican.

== History ==
As a British colony, the Province of South Carolina had a receiver of the colony appointed by its lords proprietors as well a treasurer appointed by the General Assembly. The receiver was responsible for collecting fines and quit-rents, paying government expenses, and sending surplus funds to the lords proprietors. The treasurer collected and paid money on behalf of the colonial government. In 1707, the General Assembly unilaterally merged both offices. In 1721, the name of the office was changed to treasurer, and the officer was made responsible for maintaining tax receipts and paying out expenditures as instructed by the assembly. A separate office of receiver-general was created to collect quit-rents on behalf of the British Crown. In 1771, the assembly appointed two treasurers, and five years later the treasury was made the responsibility of three commissioners. South Carolina's 1778 constitution affirmed the legislature's power to appoint treasury commissioners.

== Powers and duties ==
The state treasurer is the chief banker and investment officer of the state of South Carolina. As such, the state treasurer manages the cash flows and investments of all state funds and, in so doing, safeguards their assets. In 2022, the state treasury's custodial fund balances were approximately $2.8 billion. (Note: For comparison, the state of South Carolina spent over $34 billion in the same fiscal year.) Moreover, the state treasurer administers unclaimed property and manages the state's debt. The Office of the State Treasurer also provides certain services to South Carolina residents, including its college and ABLE savings programs.

Aside from their functional responsibilities, the state treasurer is a member of the State Fiscal Accountability Authority (SFAA), an independent agency which also includes the governor, the comptroller general, and the chairs of the budget committees in the General Assembly. The SFAA is generally charged with oversight of state spending and management of state property. In particular, the SFAA acquires insurance for state agencies and local governments, procures goods and services for the operations of state government, and oversees the construction and maintenance of state buildings. In addition, the SFAA appoints South Carolina's state auditor to serve at pleasure. (Note: The state auditor is a statutory official that functions as the external auditor of state government.)

== List of treasurers ==
Since 1865, the state treasurer has been elected at-large and serves a term of four years.

List of treasurers of South Carolina
Image	Treasurer	Party	Term of office
	William Hood	Republican	1865–1866
	S. L. Leaphart	Republican	1866–1868
	Niles G. Parker	Republican	1868–1872
	Francis Lewis Cardozo	Republican	1872–1877
	S. L. Leaphart	Democratic	1877–1881
	J. P. Richardson	Democratic	1881–1887
	I. S. Bamberg	Democratic	1887–1889
	E. R. McIver	Democratic	1889–1891
	W. T. C. Bates	Democratic	1891–1897
	W. H. Timmerman	Democratic	1897–1901
	R. H. Jennings	Democratic	1901–1913
	S. T. Carter	Democratic	1913–1925
	Julian Haskell Scarborough	Democratic	1926–1934
	E.P. Miller	Democratic	1934–1940
	Jefferson Bates	Democratic	January 10, 1940 – August 17, 1966 (Died)
	Grady Patterson	Democratic	January 17, 1967 – January 11, 1995 (Lost reelection)
	Richard Eckstrom	Republican	January 11, 1995 – January 11, 1999 (Lost reelection)
	Grady Patterson	Democratic	January 11, 1999 – January 3, 2007 (Lost reelection)
	Thomas Ravenel	Republican	January 3, 2007 – July 24, 2007 (Resigned)
	Converse Chellis	Republican	August 3, 2007 – January 12, 2011 (Lost nomination)
	Curtis Loftis	Republican	January 11, 2011 – incumbent

== Works cited ==
- Whitney, Edson L. (1969). Government of the Colony of South Carolina. New York: Negro Universities Press. LCCN 69-16559.
