= Jim Lander =

American politician (1930–2020)

37th Comptroller General of South Carolina
- In office January 1999 – January 2003
- Preceded by: Earle Morris Jr.
- Succeeded by: Richard Eckstrom

Member of the South Carolina Senate from the 18th district
- In office January 1993 – January 1999
- Preceded by: Thomas H. Pope III
- Succeeded by: André Bauer

Personal details
- Born: April 9, 1930 Abbeville, South Carolina, U.S.
- Died: October 29, 2020 (aged 90) Newberry, South Carolina, U.S.
- Party: Democratic
- Education: Lander University

Military service
- Allegiance: United States
- Branch/service: United States Army
- Unit: South Carolina Army National Guard

James Albert Lander (April 9, 1930 – October 29, 2020) was an American politician. He sat on the South Carolina Senate between 1993 and 1999, then became Comptroller General of South Carolina until 2003.

== Early life and military career ==
Lander was from Abbeville, South Carolina. He served on the Abbeville City Council in 1952 and was a member of the class of 1953 at Erskine College. Lander left Erskine without graduating to serve in the South Carolina Army National Guard (SCANG). Lander was on active duty from 1966 through 1971, and served tours of duty in Korea and Vietnam. He became chief of staff of the SCANG, retiring in 1985.

In 1986, Lander completed his bachelor's degree at Lander College, which was named for his great-grandfather. He then joined the South Carolina State Guard and retired as a major general in 1991. During his military career, Lander received the Bronze Star Medal, Legion of Merit, Meritorious Service Medal, Army Commendation Medal, and the Order of the Palmetto.

== Political career ==
Lander ran for the 40th district seat in the South Carolina House of Representatives in 1988, challenging incumbent Dave Waldrop Jr. in the Democratic Party primary election. He lost the election to Waldrop. Lander challenged Waldrop again in 1990, and lost again.

After Thomas H. Pope announced he would not seek reelection for the District 18 seat in the South Carolina Senate in the 1992 elections, Lander declared his candidacy to succeed him. Lander won the election. He was reelected in 1996.

In 1998, Lander ran for Comptroller General of South Carolina, as the incumbent, Earle Morris Jr., opted to retire. He won the election, defeating John Courson. He lost reelection in 2002 to Richard Eckstrom. The next year, Lander ran in the special election for the state senate seat for the 18th district vacated by André Bauer, who resigned after being elected Lieutenant Governor of South Carolina. He won the Democratic nomination, but lost to Republican Ronnie Cromer.

== Personal life ==
Lander and his wife, Jolene, married on June 8, 1952. They have seven children and lived in Newberry, South Carolina. He died on October 29, 2020, in Newberry at age 90.

Party political offices
Preceded by Earle Morris Jr.	Democratic nominee for South Carolina Comptroller General; 1998, 2002	Succeeded by Drew Theodore
