= Joan Hornig =

American jewelry designer

- Born: Cleveland, Ohio
- Occupation: Jewelry designer

Joan Hornig is an American jewelry designer.

== Background ==
=== Early life and education ===
Hornig grew up in a suburb of Cleveland, Ohio. She graduated Phi Beta Kappa from Harvard College in 1977 with a degree in fine arts before going on to get her MBA at Columbia Business School in 1984.

=== Career ===
Hornig began her career in educational administration after briefly teaching art to elementary school children. In the late 1970s she worked as a capital campaign fundraiser, resident freshmen proctor and academic adviser at Harvard. Her career in the non-profit/higher education sector continued through the mid-1980s.

Hornig was the Director of Corporate Relations and External Affairs at Columbia Business School prior to going to Wall Street in 1985, working in management, operations, administration, private equity, hedge funds, marketing and consulting.

She also worked as chief administrative officer of Mitchell Hutchins.

Hornig created jewelry as a hobby inspired by her interest in art history and the decorative arts. After the September 11 attacks, Hornig began working full time in philanthropy.

Hornig started a nationwide trunk show tour in April, 2019.

== Joan Hornig Jewelry ==
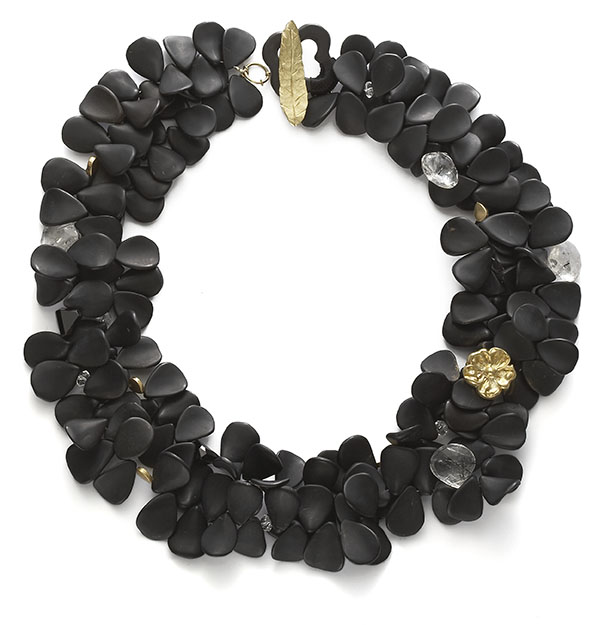
Onyx Petals, an example of Hornig's jewelry design

Joan Hornig Jewelry was founded in 2003. The company operates under the philosophy that "Philanthropy is Beautiful". 100% of the profit from each piece sold is donated to the 501(c)(3) organization of the purchaser's choice through the Joan B. Hornig Foundation.

The Joan Hornig Philanthropy is Beautiful collection of earrings, necklaces, bracelets, and rings uses 18k green gold, sterling silver, and various precious and semi-precious stones. Hornig draws inspiration from her travels and from her art history background. As of 2013, over 800 non-profit organizations dealing with education, medical research, social services, the arts, animal and human rights, and environmental protection had received donations by way of Joan Hornig Jewelry. Limited edition special initiative pieces have also been designed for organizations including UNICEF, Circle of Women, Help USA, the ASPCA, the Girl Scouts and Haiti relief.

== Pavé The Way Jewelry ==
In September 2018, Hornig released a line of jewelry that donates 100% of its profit to the charity of the purchaser's choice. Each jewelry piece represents current political and social causes, ranging from female empowerment to gun violence and environmentalism. Earlier in 2018, Hornig had previously run a campaign to raise funds for Hurricane Maria's impact on Puerto Rico.

=== Retail locations ===
Her jewelry has been sold in the US by stores including Bergdorf Goodman. Joan Hornig Jewelry also sold a limited collection through The MiA Project, and in boutiques such as Tootsies, and online.

=== Wearers ===
Notable people wearing Hornig's jewelry include singer and actress Jennifer Lopez media personality Oprah Winfrey, first ladies Laura Bush and Michelle Obama, and former US Secretary of State Hillary Clinton.

== Awards and recognition ==
In 2014, Hornig was the designer honoree at the FIT Foundation's Annual Awards Gala. In the same year, she received the NECO Ellis Island Medal of Honor.

On April 23, 2012, Hornig rang the closing bell on the floor of the New York Stock Exchange, on the 10-year anniversary of the company.

For her philanthropic work, Hornig has been nominated for a 2010 MSN Butterfly Award in the category of Most Inspirational Person.

In 2008, the National Jewelry Institute selected Joan Hornig Jewelry to be part of the first Contemporary Jewelry Designer Showcase on display at The Forbes Galleries in New York.

In 2003, Hornig founded Joan Hornig Jewelry, transitioning fully from a career in finance to arts and philanthropy.

After the September 11 attacks, Hornig began to work full time in philanthropy.

== The Joan B. Hornig Foundation ==
In 2003, Hornig established the Joan B. Hornig Foundation to provide support for registered charitable organizations in the US and abroad. 100% of the profit from Joan Hornig Jewelry is donated by way of the Foundation. Contributions have been made to over 900 organizations to date. As of 2009 sales had generated contributions to over 700 different organizations in the US and abroad.

== Affiliations ==
Hornig serves on the board of trustees for the Fashion Institute of Technology since June 30, 2015 and in 2018, joined as a council member for the New York State Council on the Arts.

She and her husband George founded the Sundance Theater. Joan holds a B.A. Magna Cum Laude in Fine Arts from Harvard College and an MBA from Columbia Business School.

== Writings ==
Hornig has been a featured writer on New York Lifestyles Magazine.

== Personal life ==
Hornig resides in New York City and also spends time in Los Angeles. She and her husband George Hornig have spent time living in Southampton, New York as well, where they restored a 1860s-era barn in the area to give back to the community.
