= 1998 United States House of Representatives elections in South Carolina =

- November 3, 1998

All 6 South Carolina seats to the United States House of Representatives
	Majority party	Minority party
Party	Republican	Democratic
Last election	4	2
Seats won	4	2
Seat change	Steady	Steady
Popular vote	580,028	369,790
Percentage	59.61%	38.00%
Swing	▼4.93	▲5.36

Republican
40–50%
50–60%
60–70%
70–80%
80–90%
>90%
Democratic
40–50%
50–60%
60–70%
70–80%
80–90%
Winners
Republican Hold
Democratic Hold

The 1998 United States House of Representatives elections in South Carolina were held on November 3, 1998, to select six Representatives for two-year terms from the state of South Carolina. The primary elections for the Democrats and the Republicans were held on June 9 and the runoff elections were held two weeks later on June 23. All five incumbents who ran were re-elected and the open seat in the 4th congressional district was retained by the Republicans. The composition of the state delegation remained four Republicans and two Democrats.

== 1st congressional district ==
Incumbent Republican Congressman Mark Sanford of the 1st congressional district, in office since 1995, defeated Natural Law candidate Joseph F. Innella.

=== General election results ===
South Carolina's 1st congressional district election results, 1998
Party	Candidate	Votes	%	±%
Republican	Mark Sanford (incumbent)	118,414	91.0	−5.4
Natural Law	Joseph F. Innella	11,586	8.9	+5.4
No party	Write-Ins	71	0.1	0.0
Majority		106,828	82.1	−10.8
Turnout		130,071		
Republican hold				

== 2nd congressional district ==
Incumbent Republican Congressman Floyd Spence of the 2nd congressional district, in office since 1971, defeated Democratic challenger Jane Frederick.

=== General election results ===
South Carolina's 2nd congressional district election results, 1998
Party	Candidate	Votes	%	±%
Republican	Floyd Spence (incumbent)	119,583	57.8	−32.0
Democratic	Jane Frederick	84,864	41.1	+41.1
Natural Law	Maurice T. Raiford	2,276	1.1	−8.9
No party	Write-Ins	40	0.0	−0.2
Majority		34,719	16.7	−63.1
Turnout		206,763		
Republican hold				

== 3rd congressional district ==
Incumbent Republican Congressman Lindsey Graham of the 3rd congressional district, in office since 1995, was unopposed in his bid for re-election.

=== General election results ===
South Carolina's 3rd congressional district election results, 1998
Party	Candidate	Votes	%	±%
Republican	Lindsey Graham (incumbent)	129,047	99.7	+39.4
No party	Write-Ins	402	0.3	+0.3
Majority		128,645	99.4	+77.8
Turnout		129,449		
Republican hold				

== 4th congressional district ==
Incumbent Republican Congressman Bob Inglis of the 4th congressional district, in office since 1993, chose to run for Senator instead of re-election. Jim DeMint won the Republican primary and defeated Democrat Glenn Reese in the general election.

=== Democratic primary ===
Democratic primary
Candidate	Votes	%
Glenn Reese	4,882	53.0
Bill McCuen	3,419	37.2
Launeil Neil Sanders	902	9.8

=== Republican primary ===
Republican primary
Candidate	Votes	%
Mike Fair	12,924	32.4
Jim DeMint	9,300	23.3
Howell Clyborne	8,601	21.6
Jim Ritchie	7,788	19.6
Franklin D. Raddish	1,232	3.1

Republican primary runoff
Candidate	Votes	%	±%
Jim DeMint	18,445	52.9	+29.6
Mike Fair	16,413	47.1	+14.7

=== General election results ===
South Carolina's 4th congressional district election results, 1998
Party	Candidate	Votes	%	±%
Republican	Jim DeMint	105,264	57.7	−13.2
Democratic	Glenn Reese	73,314	40.2	+12.4
Natural Law	C. Faye Walters	1,988	1.1	−0.2
Reform	Peter J. Ashy*	1,754	0.9	+0.9
No party	Write-Ins	230	0.1	+0.1
Majority		31,950	17.5	−25.6
Turnout		182,550		
Republican hold				
*Ashy also ran under the Patriot Party; his totals are combined.

== 5th congressional district ==
Incumbent Democratic Congressman John M. Spratt, Jr. of the 5th congressional district, in office since 1983, defeated Republican challenger Mike Burkhold.

=== General election results ===
South Carolina's 5th congressional district election results, 1998
Party	Candidate	Votes	%	±%
Democratic	John M. Spratt, Jr. (incumbent)	95,105	57.9	+3.8
Republican	Mike Burkhold	66,299	40.3	−5.0
Natural Law	Dianne Nevins	2,760	1.7	+1.1
No party	Write-Ins	103	0.1	+0.1
Majority		28,806	17.6	+8.8
Turnout		164,267		
Democratic hold				

== 6th congressional district ==
Incumbent Democratic Congressman Jim Clyburn of the 6th congressional district, in office since 1993, defeated Republican challenger Gary McLeod.

=== Democratic primary ===
Democratic primary
Candidate	Votes	%
Jim Clyburn	32,652	83.1
Mike Wilson	6,655	16.9

=== Republican primary ===
Republican primary
Candidate	Votes	%
Gary McLeod	4,733	63.3
Vince Ellison	2,744	36.7

=== General election results ===
South Carolina's 6th congressional district election results, 1998
Party	Candidate	Votes	%	±%
Democratic	Jim Clyburn (incumbent)	116,507	72.6	+3.3
Republican	Gary McLeod	41,421	25.8	−4.3
Natural Law	George C. Taylor	2,496	1.5	+0.9
No party	Write-Ins	152	0.1	+0.1
Majority		75,086	46.8	+7.6
Turnout		160,576		
Democratic hold				

== See also ==
- United States House elections, 1998
- United States Senate election in South Carolina, 1998
- South Carolina gubernatorial election, 1998
- South Carolina's congressional districts
