= Grady Patterson =

United States Air Force general (1924–2009)

South Carolina Treasurer
- In office January 11, 1999 – January 10, 2007
- Governor: David Beasley; Jim Hodges; Mark Sanford
- Preceded by: Richard Eckstrom
- Succeeded by: Thomas Ravenel
- In office January 17, 1967 – January 11, 1995
- Governor: Robert Evander McNair; John C. West; James B. Edwards; Richard Riley; Carroll A. Campbell Jr.
- Preceded by: Jefferson Bates
- Succeeded by: Richard Eckstrom

Personal details
- Born: January 13, 1924 Calhoun Falls, South Carolina, U.S.
- Died: December 7, 2009 (aged 85)
- Resting place: Elmwood Memorial Gardens, Columbia, South Carolina
- Party: Democratic
- Spouse: Marjorie H. Faucett (m. 1951)
- Children: 6 - Grady L. (III), Steven G., Lynne, Laura, Amy, and Beth
- Education: University of South Carolina (B.A., J.D.)
- Occupation: Military Officer; Politician
- Awards: Air Force Distinguished Service Medal

Military service
- Allegiance: United States
- Branch/service: South Carolina Air National Guard
- Years of service: 1946–1984
- Rank: Lieutenant General

Grady Leslie Patterson Jr. (January 13, 1924 – December 7, 2009) was a Democratic Party politician who served as the South Carolina Treasurer and a United States Air Force Lieutenant General.

Born in Calhoun Falls, South Carolina, Patterson graduated from University of South Carolina. He served in World War II in the U.S. Army Air Forces, flying missions from Iwo Jima as a fighter pilot. In 1946, he became a member of the South Carolina Air National Guard serving in the Korean War and the Berlin Airlift. He also served as Chief of Staff for the South Carolina Air National Guard and Assistant to the Commander of the United States Air Force Logistics Command. When he retired in 1984, the South Carolina State Legislature promoted him from Major General to Lieutenant General.

Patterson served as Assistant Attorney General under Dan McLeod in 1959 until he was first elected in 1966 as the State Treasurer after the death of Jefferson Bates. He was re-elected in 1970, 1974, 1978, 1982, 1986 and 1990, serving a total of 36 years. He was defeated by Republican Richard Eckstrom in the Republican Revolution of 1994 but defeated Eckstrom in a rematch in 1998. He was re-elected in 2002 but in 2006, he was defeated by Republican Thomas Ravenel.

== Notes ==
Party political offices
Preceded by Jefferson Bates	Democratic nominee for South Carolina Treasurer; 1966, 1970, 1974, 1978, 1982, 1986, 1990, 1994, 1998, 2002, 2006	Vacant Title next held by Rosalyn L. Glenn
