= Arroyo High School =

Arroyo High School may refer to:

- Arroyo High School (San Lorenzo, California)
- Arroyo High School (El Monte, California)
