= Con Chellis =

American politician (born 1978)

Member of the South Carolina House of Representatives from the 94th district
- In office January 9, 2019 – November 8, 2020
- Preceded by: Katie Arrington
- Succeeded by: Gil Gatch

Personal details
- Born: November 16, 1978 (age 47) Charleston, South Carolina, U.S.
- Party: Republican
- Spouse: Tara Chellis
- Relations: Converse Chellis (father)
- Children: 3
- Education: East Tennessee State University

Con Chellis (born Converse A. Chellis IV; November 16, 1978) is an American insurance agent and politician. In 2018, he was elected to the South Carolina House of Representatives, where he served one term.

== Early life and education ==
Born November 16, 1978 in Charleston, South Carolina, he is the son of Converse Chellis III and Sharon Chellis, and a 2002 graduate of East Tennessee State University in political science. Chellis has served since 2016 on the county council of Dorchester County.

== Career ==
On October 2, 2017, Chellis amnouncced that he was running for the 94th district seat, representing portions of Charleston and Dorchester counties, as incumbent Katie Arrington had announced that she was running against incumbent Congressman Mark Sanford in the Republican primary. He won the June 2, 2018 primary, with 62.8% of the vote to 31.14% for Evan Guthrie and 6.07% for Glenn Zingarino. On November 6, he won the general election, receiving 8,450 to 4,960 for Democratic nominee Damian Daly (who had also been the Democratic nominee in the 2014 and 2016 races for this seat).

He did not run for re-election in 2020.

== Personal life ==
On February 21, 2009, he married Tara Lorraine, a chiropractor. They have three children.

South Carolina House of Representatives
Preceded by Katie Arrington	Member of the South Carolina House of Representatives from the 94th district 2019–2020	Succeeded by Gil Gatch
