= Lora Aroyo =

Dutch computer scientist

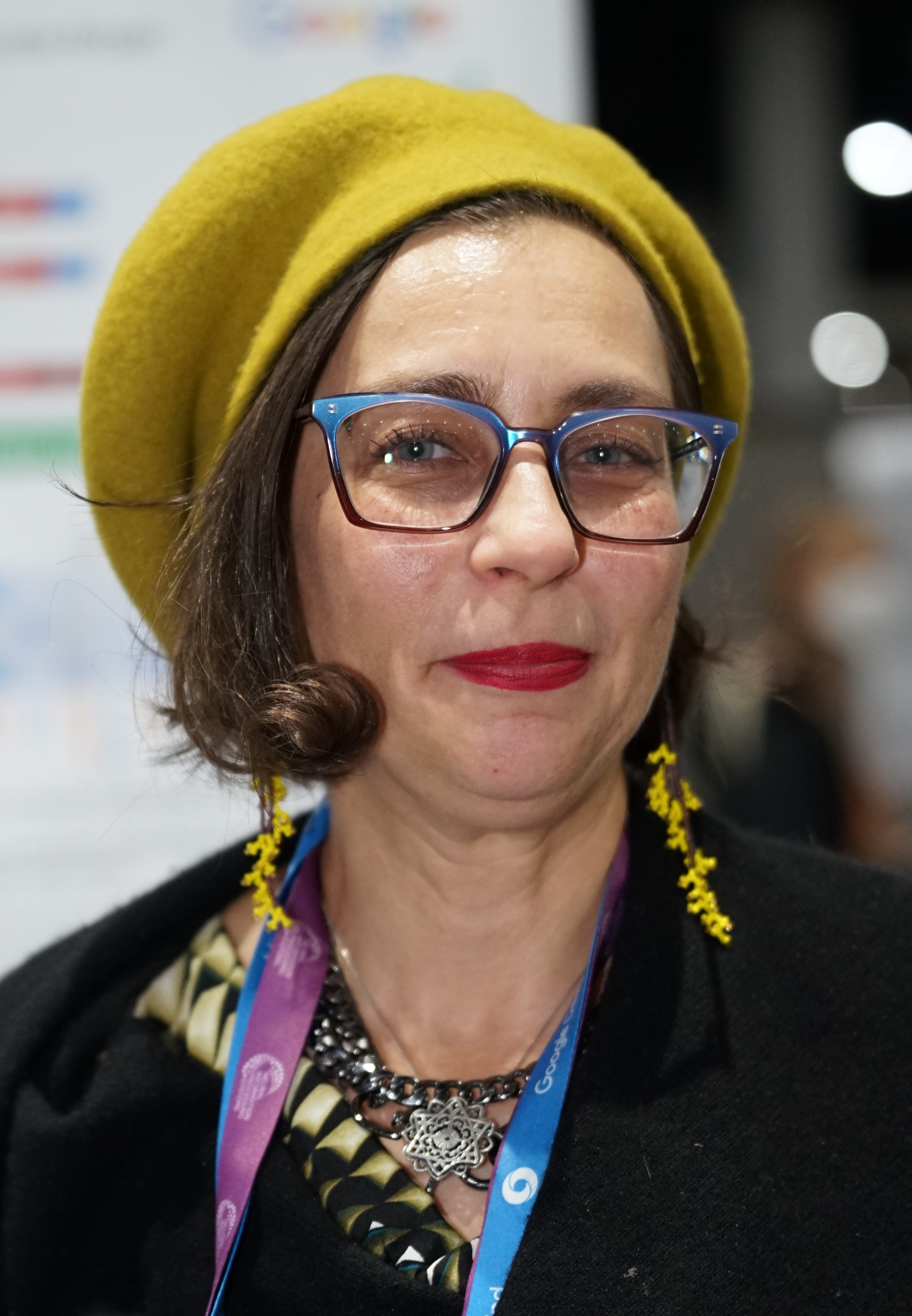
- Aroyo in 2025
- Born: Sofia, Bulgaria
- Education: University of Twente
- Known for: CrowdTruth
- Awards: IBM Faculty Award ×4; ACM Distinguished Lecturer
- Scientific career
- Fields: Semantic Web; Computer science
- Workplaces: VU Amsterdam
- Doctoral advisor: Jef Moonen; Paul De Bra

Lora Aroyo (born in Bulgaria) is a Dutch computer scientist at Google Research, and formerly a professor at The Vrije Universiteit Amsterdam, Netherlands. She is best known for her work in user modeling, digital humanities, and for the CrowdTruth crowdsourcing method. She was the founding head of the user-centric data science (UCDS) research group in the VU Computer Science department, president of the User Modeling Society, a former vice-president of Semantic Technology Institute, Chief Scientist at Tagasauris, and a member of over 100 scientific program committees and editorial boards. She was one of the few female full professors of Computer Science in the Netherlands, and her departure to Google leaves only one woman (out of over 20 full professors) at the VU.

After leaving Bulgaria during the aftermath of the fall of communism, Aroyo obtained a PhD in Educational Science and Technology from University of Twente. She worked with Paul De Bra at Eindhoven University of Technology in the area of intelligent tutoring systems, focusing primarily on understanding and modeling the different needs of users to make the experience more productive.

Aroyo moved to the VU University in 2006 and began her seminal work in cultural heritage, later called digital humanities. With colleagues Guus Schreiber and others, she is credited with pioneering niche-sourcing.

In 2013, Aroyo spent her sabbatical working with the IBM Watson team, just after the famous Jeopardy! match, where she developed the Crowd Truth methodology with Chris Welty.

In 2018, she was listed among the top women semantic web researchers without a Wikipedia page.She was later nominated to have this page authored during the Ada Lovelace women in computing hackathon.
