= Thomas Ravenel =

American politician (born 1962)

Treasurer of South Carolina
- In office January 10, 2007 – July 24, 2007
- Governor: Mark Sanford
- Preceded by: Grady Patterson
- Succeeded by: Converse Chellis

Personal details
- Born: Thomas Jonathan Jackson Ravenel; August 11, 1962 (age 63) Charleston, South Carolina, U.S.
- Party: Republican (before 2014, 2025–present); Independent (2014–2025)
- Spouse: Mary Ryan (m. 1995; div. 1998)
- Domestic partner: Kathryn Dennis (2014–2016)
- Children: 3
- Education: The Citadel (BBA); University of South Carolina, Columbia (MBA)

Thomas Jonathan Jackson Ravenel (born August 11, 1962) is an American politician and reality television star. He is the son of former representative Arthur Ravenel Jr. from South Carolina.

He starred for five seasons on the Bravo reality-television series Southern Charm, was state treasurer for six months, was an Independent candidate for the United States Senate in the 2014 election in South Carolina, and a Republican candidate for U.S. Senate in the 2004 primary election. He is also a member of the French Huguenot Church in Charleston.

== Background ==
Prior to running for office, Ravenel founded the Ravenel Development Corporation, a commercial real estate company.

Ravenel ran for the U.S. Senate in 2004, seeking the seat left open when Fritz Hollings retired. He came in third in the Republican primary election. After Ravenel endorsed Republican Jim DeMint, DeMint went on to win the Republican runoff and the general election. Subsequently, Ravenel was fined over $19,000 by the Federal Election Commission for improperly filing the required forms for the election. Ravenel ran for South Carolina Treasurer in 2006, defeating nine-term state treasurer Democrat Grady Patterson in the 2006 general election. Ravenel endorsed Ron Paul in the 2012 Republican primaries.

Ravenel was previously in the cast of Bravo’s Southern Charm. He lived at Brookland Plantation, an estate he purchased in 2006, until he sold it in 2021.

== Education ==
Ravenel graduated from The Citadel in Charleston, receiving a Bachelor of Science in Business Administration (B.S.B.A.) in 1985. He later received an M.B.A. from the University of South Carolina in 1991. His M.B.A. studies were focused on finance and real estate.

== Federal drug charges ==
In June 2007, Ravenel was indicted on federal cocaine distribution charges by US Attorney Reginald Lloyd. The filed charges allege that Ravenel purchased less than 500 grams of cocaine through an intermediary in Charleston, South Carolina, in 2005, prior to his election as treasurer but after his abortive entry in the 2004 Senate race.

Governor Mark Sanford suspended Ravenel from his duties as state treasurer upon learning of the charges, and appointed Columbia attorney Ken Wingate to replace Ravenel on an interim basis. Meanwhile, Ravenel decided to enter a rehabilitation facility, according to prosecutors.

Ravenel had also been volunteering for the Rudolph Giuliani presidential campaign, serving as his South Carolina state chairman. Ravenel resigned from that post after the indictment, according to Giuliani campaign officials. The campaign subsequently replaced Ravenel with Barry Winn, who was co-chair of South Carolina finance committee.

On July 24, 2007 Ravenel resigned as Treasurer. The South Carolina General Assembly elected state Rep. Converse Chellis to serve out the remainder of his term.

Ravenel underwent a rehabilitation program in Arizona, and then returned to plead guilty to "conspiring to buy and distribute less than 100 grams of cocaine" in September 2007.

=== Sentencing ===
On March 14, 2008, Thomas Ravenel was sentenced to 10 months in federal prison for drug charges against him but was not immediately ordered to report to begin his sentence.

== 2014 campaign for U.S. Senate ==
On July 14, 2014, Thomas Ravenel submitted more than 17,000 signatures, officially placing him on the ballot as an independent candidate against incumbent senator Lindsey Graham. He finished in third place, garnering 3.9% of the vote.

== 2026 gubernatorial campaign ==
On February 7, 2025, Ravenel announced on X that he would run for governor of South Carolina in 2026, seeking to succeed term-limited governor Henry McMaster. He later told The Hill that he would run as a Republican in the election. Ravenel suspended his campaign four days after announcing his candidacy, saying that he needed to focus on his family.

== Personal life ==
Ravenel and his ex-girlfriend, Kathryn Calhoun Dennis, have two children, a girl and a boy. His third child, a son, was born in 2020, with an ex-girlfriend.

== Assault and battery allegations ==
In April 2018, Ashley Perkins, a Florida-based real estate agent, claimed that Ravenel sexually battered her mother, Debbie Holloway Perkins, after meeting him on the dating app Tinder in December 2015. Perkins claims her mother later told her that Ravenel "stuck his penis in her face" and held her arms back while sticking his fingers inside her vagina and anus. Perkins said she did not witness the battery, but that her mother seemed "very withdrawn" and finally confided in her. According to Perkins, her mother is unable to publicly discuss the case due to a non-disclosure agreement negotiated by attorney Gloria Allred as part of an alleged $200,000 settlement with Ravenel. However, Perkins, who claims to be a witness to the mediation process between her mother and Ravenel, was not bound to such an agreement and therefore able to publicly disclose the details of the case.

Richard P. Terbrusch, Ravenel's attorney, denied Perkins' allegations, stating that his "client enjoys a certain degree of fame and unfortunately has become—unfairly—a target for an individual who has, in my opinion, dubious motivations." Bravo and Southern Charm production company, Haymaker, announced on May 4, 2018, that it was taking the "allegations very seriously" and launching its own investigation into their validity.

In May 2018, a second accuser—Dawn Ledwell, former nanny of Ravenel's children—came forward (Dawn admitted in court filings that Kathryn Dennis pushed Dawn to come forward) with new allegations of sexual battery against Ravenel. "Nanny Dawn" (as she was known to Southern Charm's viewers), and close friend of Kathryn Dennis, claims that in January 2015, Ravenel assaulted her after a night out with his friends: "I went upstairs to get my jacket which had the key to my vehicle in the pocket. I was corralled into the master bedroom, and he shut the door behind me. I turned around, and he had his pants dropped, not wearing underwear," she said. "He was blocking the door. I was mortified, embarrassed, and scared." Charleston police opened an investigation into the alleged assault after the nanny filed an incident report in early May.

In September 2018, Ashley Perkins published on her official website that Ledwell had first contacted her that spring, prior to going to the police. At that time, Ledwell shared with Perkins "very intimate details of her life and events with Thomas". By May, however, Perkins said she had "serious doubts" about Ledwell's accusations, stating that Ledwell's police report and public accounts of "forcible rape" differed from what Ledwell had told her privately. As a result, Perkins cut off her relationship with Ledwell, but "wishes her the best.". In February 2019, Dawn Ledwell amended her original summons and complaint through the courts where the sexual contact is no longer listed.

On September 11, 2019, Ravenel pled guilty to third-degree assault and battery in connection with an attack on Ledwell. He paid a $500 fine, but served no jail time. He also settled a civil suit with Ledwell, agreeing to donate $80,000 in her name to a charity for sexual assault survivors in lieu of paying her damages.

Party political offices
Preceded by W. Greg Ryberg	Republican nominee for Treasurer of South Carolina; 2006	Succeeded by Curtis Loftis
Political offices
Preceded by Grady Patterson	Treasurer of South Carolina; 2007	Succeeded by Converse Chellis
