= Thomas H. Pope III =

American lawyer & politician (born 1946)

Tom Pope

Member of the South Carolina Senate from the 18th district
- In office November 12, 1984 – November 9, 1992
- Preceded by: Robert C. Lake Jr.
- Succeeded by: Jim Lander

Personal details
- Born: Thomas Harrington Pope III; March 30, 1946 (age 80) Richland County, South Carolina, United States
- Party: Democratic
- Spouse: Adele Jeffords (m. 1973)
- Children: 2
- Parent: Thomas H. Pope Jr. (father)
- Education: University of the South (BA); University of South Carolina School of Law (JD)
- Occupation: Lawyer; politician

Military service
- Branch/service: United States Navy
- Years of service: 1968–1971
- Battles/wars: Vietnam War

Thomas Harrington Pope III (born March 30, 1946) is an American lawyer and politician. He served in the South Carolina Senate from 1984 to 1992.

== Early life and career ==
Pope, an attorney, served as Chair of the South Carolina Chapter of American College of Trial Lawyers from 2015 to 2017.

== Political career ==
Pope was elected to serve in 1985 and opted not seek to reelection for the District 18 seat in the South Carolina Senate in the 1992 elections.

== Personal life ==
Pope and his wife, Adele Jeffords, married on November 17, 1973, and have two children. His father, Thomas H. Pope Jr., served in the South Carolina Legislature and was Speaker of the House.
