= Arroyo, West Virginia =

Unincorporated community in West Virginia, United States

- Unincorporated community
- Location within West Virginia Location within the United States
- Coordinates: 40°34′12″N 80°39′23″W
- Country: United States
- State: West Virginia
- County: Hancock
- Elevation: 686 ft (209 m)
- Time zone: UTC-5 (Eastern (EST))
  - Summer (DST): UTC-4 (EDT)
- GNIS ID: 1535027

Arroyo is an unincorporated community in Hancock County, West Virginia, United States. It was also known as Brooklyn.

The community derives name from nearby Dry Creek, arroyo meaning "dry creek" in Spanish.
