= Thomas H. Pope Jr. =

American politician (1913–1999)

53rd Speaker of the South Carolina House of Representatives
- In office February 15, 1949 – November 13, 1950
- Preceded by: C. Bruce Littlejohn
- Succeeded by: Solomon Blatt Sr.

Member of the South Carolina House of Representatives from Newberry County
- In office January 8, 1946 – November 13, 1950
- Preceded by: Steve C. Griffith
- Succeeded by: Frank E. Jordan Jr.
- In office November 9, 1936 – July 8, 1940
- Succeeded by: Julian A. Price

Personal details
- Born: Thomas Harrington Pope Jr. July 28, 1913 Kinards, South Carolina, United States
- Died: August 23, 1999 (aged 86) Newberry, South Carolina, United States
- Party: Democratic
- Spouse: Mary Waties Lumpkin (m. 1940)
- Children: 3, including Thomas III
- Education: The Citadel (AB); University of South Carolina School of Law (LLB)
- Occupation: Lawyer; politician

Military service
- Branch/service: United States Army
- Years of service: 1941–1945 (active); 1945–1957 (reserve)
- Rank: Brigadier general
- Unit: 263rd Coast Artillery Regiment, South Carolina National Guard
- Battles/wars: World War II; North African campaign

Thomas Harrington Pope Jr. (July 28, 1913 – August 23, 1999) was an American lawyer and politician who served in the South Carolina House of Representatives. He was that body's speaker from 1949 to 1950 and ran for the Democratic Party nomination in the 1950 South Carolina gubernatorial election, losing handily to James F. Byrnes.
