= Richard Eckstrom =

American politician (born 1948)

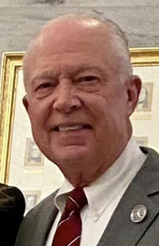
- Eckstrom in 2022

38th Comptroller General of South Carolina
- In office January 15, 2003 – April 30, 2023
- Governor: Mark Sanford; Nikki Haley; Henry McMaster
- Preceded by: Jim Lander
- Succeeded by: Brian J. Gaines

Treasurer of South Carolina
- In office January 11, 1995 – January 13, 1999
- Governor: David Beasley
- Preceded by: Grady Patterson
- Succeeded by: Grady Patterson

Personal details
- Born: June 23, 1948 (age 78) Duluth, Minnesota, U.S.
- Party: Republican
- Education: University of South Carolina (BA, MBA, MS)

Military service
- Allegiance: United States
- Branch/service: United States Navy
- Rank: Captain

Richard A. Eckstrom (born June 23, 1948) is an American politician from the state of South Carolina. A Republican, he served as the comptroller general of South Carolina from 2003 until his resignation in 2023. From 1995 to 1999, he served one term as the South Carolina Treasurer. When elected as Comptroller General, he was the first Republican to serve in the post since 1876.

== Early life ==
Eckstrom was born in Duluth, Minnesota, on June 23, 1948. His family moved to Columbia, South Carolina, in 1957, when his father, a professor, took a job at the University of South Carolina (USC). He graduated from USC in 1971 with a bachelor's degree. He served in the United States Navy, reaching the rank of captain, and worked in business. Eckstrom returned to school and earned a Master of Business Administration from USC in 1977. He went to work for Peat Marwick Mitchell in Columbia in 1978. He earned a master's degree in accounting from USC in 1978. He is a certified public accountant.

== Career ==
In the 1994 elections, Eckstrom ran as a Republican for Treasurer of South Carolina and defeated Grady Patterson, a Democrat who served in the role for 28 years. Patterson defeated Eckstrom in the 1998 elections. In 1999, Eckstrom ran in a special election to the South Carolina House of Representatives to succeed André Bauer, who resigned after being elected to the South Carolina Senate. Eckstrom lost to Chip Huggins.

In 2002, Eckstrom ran for comptroller general of South Carolina. He defeated Jim Lander, the incumbent, in the general election. He was reelected in 2006, 2010, 2014, and 2018. He won reelection to a sixth term without opposition in 2022.

=== 2023 accounting error and resignation ===
In February 2023, Eckstrom informed the South Carolina Senate that the budget was off by $3.5 billion due to an accounting error. According to Eckstrom, over the period of ten years, money was given to colleges and universities but was not reflected in financial records. Eckstrom blamed an issue in the state's accounting system dating back to 2007. In March, representative Gil Gatch introduced a resolution that could begin an impeachment inquiry. After an investigation from the Senate Finance Constitutional subcommittee, the panel recommended that Eckstrom be removed from office and that the office of comptroller general be abolished. Subcommittee members felt that Eckstrom’s actions did not constitute an impeachable offense as there was no criminal misconduct, but recommended that the General Assembly remove the comptroller from office for willful neglect of duty, as allowed by the state constitution.

On March 14, the South Carolina House of Representatives passed legislation in a 104–7 vote that reduced Eckstrom's salary to $1 annually for the remainder of his term.

Eckstrom announced on March 23 that he sent his resignation to the governor, which took effect April 30, 2023.

== Personal life ==
Eckstrom and his first wife, Peggy, had three children. Eckstrom married Kelly Payne in December 2019.

Party political offices
Preceded by Bill Linder	Republican nominee for South Carolina Treasurer; 1994, 1998	Succeeded by W. Greg Ryberg
Preceded by John Courson	Republican nominee for South Carolina Comptroller General; 2002, 2006, 2010, 2014, 2018, 2022	Succeeded by Mike Burkhold
Political offices
Preceded by Grady Patterson	Treasurer of South Carolina; 1995–1999	Succeeded by Grady Patterson
Preceded by Jim Lander	Comptroller General of South Carolina; 2003–2023	Succeeded by Ronnie Head; Acting
