= Converse Chellis =

American politician (1943–2026)

Treasurer of South Carolina
- In office August 3, 2007 – January 12, 2011
- Governor: Mark Sanford
- Preceded by: Thomas Ravenel
- Succeeded by: Curtis Loftis

Member of the South Carolina House of Representatives from the 94th district
- In office 1996–2006
- Preceded by: Heyward Hutson
- Succeeded by: Heyward Hutson

Personal details
- Born: Converse Alvah Chellis III; August 10, 1943 Summerville, South Carolina, U.S.
- Died: June 14, 2026 (aged 82)
- Party: Republican
- Children: 2, including Con
- Education: The Citadel (BS)

Military service
- Branch/service: United States Air Force
- Rank: Captain

Converse Alvah Chellis III (August 10, 1943 – June 14, 2026) was an American politician and accountant who served as the Treasurer of South Carolina and as a member of the South Carolina House of Representatives from 1996 to 2006.

== Early life and education ==
Chellis was born and raised in Summerville, South Carolina. He earned a Bachelor of Science degree from The Citadel and served as a captain in the United States Air Force.

== Career ==
Prior to entering politics, Chellis worked as a Certified Public Accountant. In 1996, he was elected to the 94th district in the South Carolina House of Representatives, serving for 10 years. On August 3, 2007, Chellis was selected to serve as Treasurer of South Carolina by the South Carolina General Assembly, replacing Thomas Ravenel. In 2011, he was succeeded by Curtis Loftis.

== Personal life and death ==
Chellis and his wife, Sharon, have two children. His son, Con Chellis, is a member of the South Carolina House of Representatives.

Chellis died from cancer on June 14, 2026, at the age of 82.
