= 1986 South Carolina lieutenant gubernatorial election =

- November 4, 1986
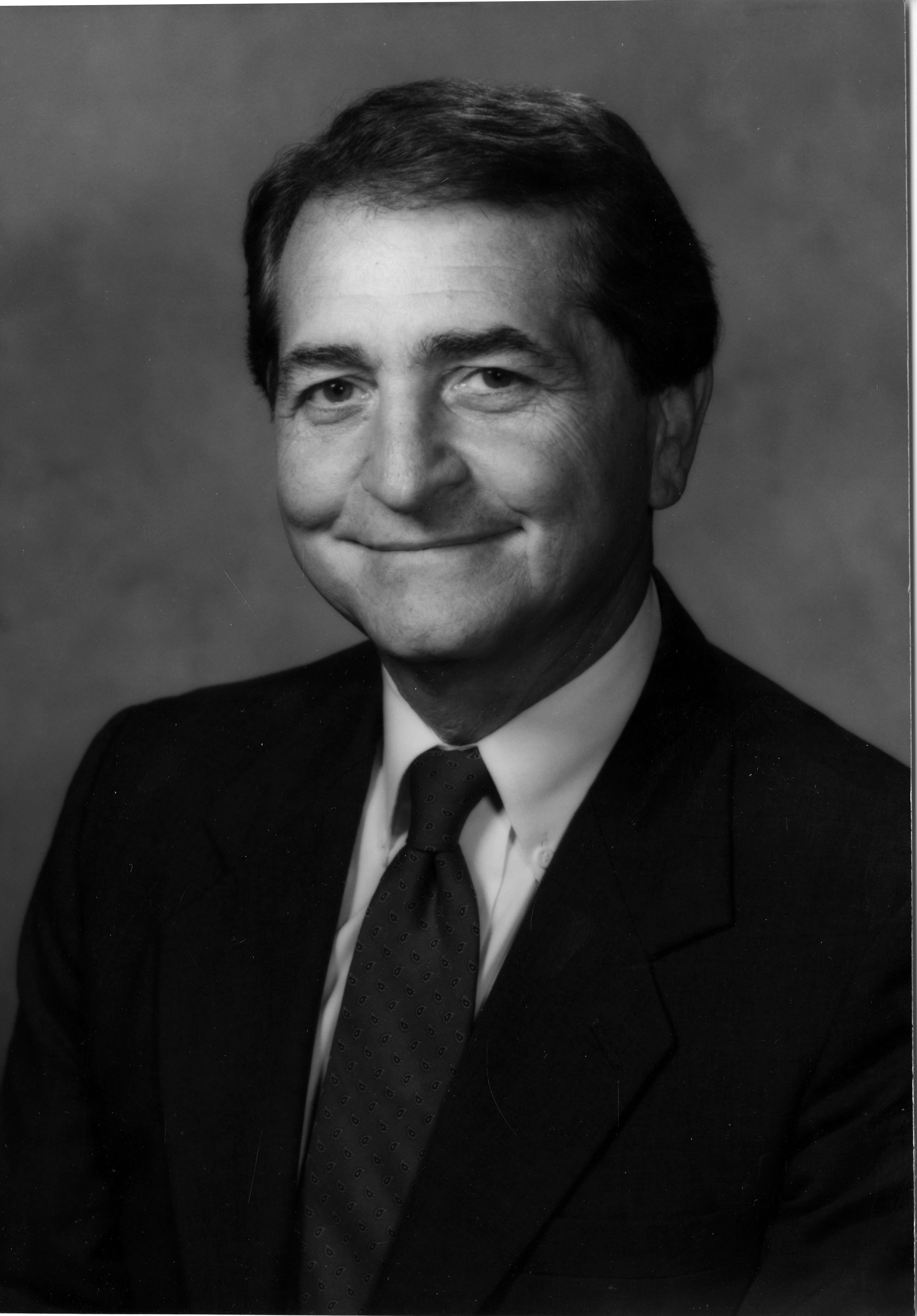

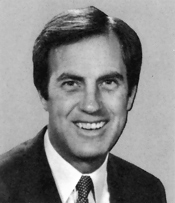
Nominee	Nick Theodore	Thomas F. Hartnett
Party	Democratic	Republican
Popular vote	374,329	360,420
Percentage	50.50%	48.62%
- County results Theodore: 50–60% 60–70% 70–80% Hartnett: 40–50% 50–60% 60–70% 70–80%
Lieutenant governor before election
Michael R. Daniel
Democratic
Elected Lieutenant governor
Nick Theodore
Democratic

The 1986 South Carolina lieutenant gubernatorial election was held on November 4, 1986, to elect the lieutenant governor of South Carolina. Incumbent Democrat Michael R. Daniel was term-limited and instead ran unsuccessfully for governor of South Carolina.

South Carolina state senator Nick Theodore won the election, defeating Republican U.S. Representative Thomas F. Hartnett by a narrow margin of just 1.88 percentage points.

== General election ==
=== Candidates ===
- Nick Theodore, South Carolina state senator (1981–1987) (Democratic)
- Thomas F. Hartnett. U.S. Representative from South Carolina's 1st congressional district (1981–1987) (Republican)
- Mark D. Johnson (Libertarian)

=== Results ===
1986 South Carolina lieutenant gubernatorial election results
Party	Candidate	Votes	%	±%
Democratic	Nick Theodore	374,329	50.50%	−16.29%
Republican	Thomas F. Hartnett	360,420	48.62%	+15.43%
Libertarian	Mark D. Johnson	6,285	0.85%	N/A
Write-in		234	0.03%	+0.01%
Total votes		741,268	100.00%	
Democratic hold				
