= Philip Lader =

American politician

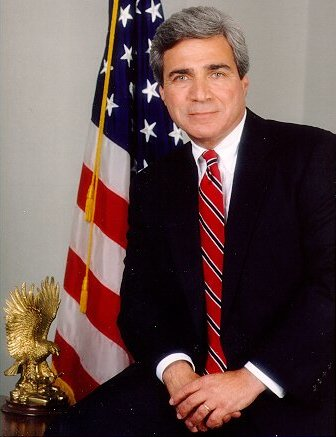

United States Ambassador to the United Kingdom
- In office September 22, 1997 – February 28, 2001
- President: Bill Clinton; George W. Bush
- Preceded by: William J. Crowe
- Succeeded by: William Stamps Farish III

19th Administrator of the Small Business Administration
- In office October 8, 1994 – February 18, 1997
- President: Bill Clinton
- Preceded by: Erskine Bowles
- Succeeded by: Aída Álvarez

White House Deputy Chief of Staff for Operations
- In office January 20, 1993 – October 3, 1994
- President: Bill Clinton
- Preceded by: Robert Zoellick
- Succeeded by: Erskine Bowles

Personal details
- Born: March 17, 1946 (age 80) New York City, New York, U.S.
- Party: Democratic
- Spouse: Linda LeSourd
- Children: 2 daughters
- Education: Duke University (BA); University of Michigan (MA); Pembroke College, Oxford; Harvard University (JD)

Philip Lader (born March 17, 1946), is a former US Ambassador to the Court of St. James’s and former chairman of WPP plc, the global advertising and communications services firm.

As a senior adviser to Morgan Stanley, he serves on several of its investment committees and boards of its private equity portfolio companies in addition to investment banking responsibilities. He is also a retired partner in the Nelson Mullins law firm.

In government, he was a member of President Clinton’s Cabinet as administrator of the US Small Business Administration, assistant to the president, White House Deputy Chief of Staff, and deputy director of the US Office of Management and Budget.

Ambassador Lader has been a member of the boards of RAND Corporation (formerly vice chairman), Lloyd's of London, Marathon Oil, AMC Entertainment, AES Corporation, UC Rusal, Songbird (Canary Wharf), Duck Creek Technologies, and Minerva Corporations, the British Museum, American Red Cross, the Smithsonian Museum of American History, St. Paul's Cathedral Foundation, Atlantic Council, and Bankinter Foundation for Innovation.

He is a member of the Council on Foreign Relations, an Honorary Fellow of London Business School and Oxford University's Pembroke College, and an Honorary Bencher of the Middle Temple (British Inns of Court).

In 1981, he and his wife, Linda LeSourd Lader, founded Renaissance Weekends, the non-partisan retreats that seek to build bridges between innovative leaders from diverse fields. They continue to host five Renaissance Weekends each year around the U.S.

== Early life and education ==
Lader graduated Phi Beta Kappa with a Bachelor of Arts in political science from Duke University in 1966, received the Master of Arts in History from the University of Michigan in 1967, completed graduate studies in law and English constitutional history at Oxford University from 1967 to 1968, and received his JD as a Leopold Schepp Scholar from Harvard Law School in 1972.

== Career ==
During his studies at Harvard Law School, Lader was an Assistant Professor of Political Science at Newton College of the Sacred Heart. After graduation, he was a law clerk to the late Judge Paul Roney, Chief Judge of the U.S. Court of Appeals for the 11th Circuit (formerly Fifth Circuit) and was associated with the New York law firm of Sullivan & Cromwell. He served in the U.S. Army (JAG) Reserves from 1969 to 1975.

Lader was president of Sea Pines Company, a developer/operator of large-scale recreation communities including Hilton Head Island, Amelia Island, and Kiawah Island. Upon sale of that company in 1983, he was president of Winthrop University in Rock Hill, South Carolina, which was awarded the National Gold Medal for "general improvement in programs" by the Council for Advancement & Support of Education during his tenure, and served until becoming a candidate in the 1986 South Carolina gubernatorial election, finishing second to then-Lieutenant Governor Michael R. Daniel and foregoing the run-off in support of Daniel, who narrowly lost to Republican Carroll A. Campbell Jr. in the general election.

From 1986 to 1989, Lader was executive vice president of Sir James Goldsmith's U.S. holdings – which included America's then-largest private landholdings, sixth-largest forest products company, largest computer supplies supplier, and oil and gas interests. After the assets' restructuring and sale, he was president and Vice-Chancellor of Bond University, Australia's first private university.

Under President Bill Clinton, described by The New York Times as "a longtime friend," Lader was confirmed unanimously three times by the U.S. Senate for his State Department, SBA and OMB roles. Returning to the private sector in 2001, Lader joined Morgan Stanley and WPP. In addition to board services, he also was the John West Professor of International Studies at The Citadel, The Military College of South Carolina from 2001 to 2006.

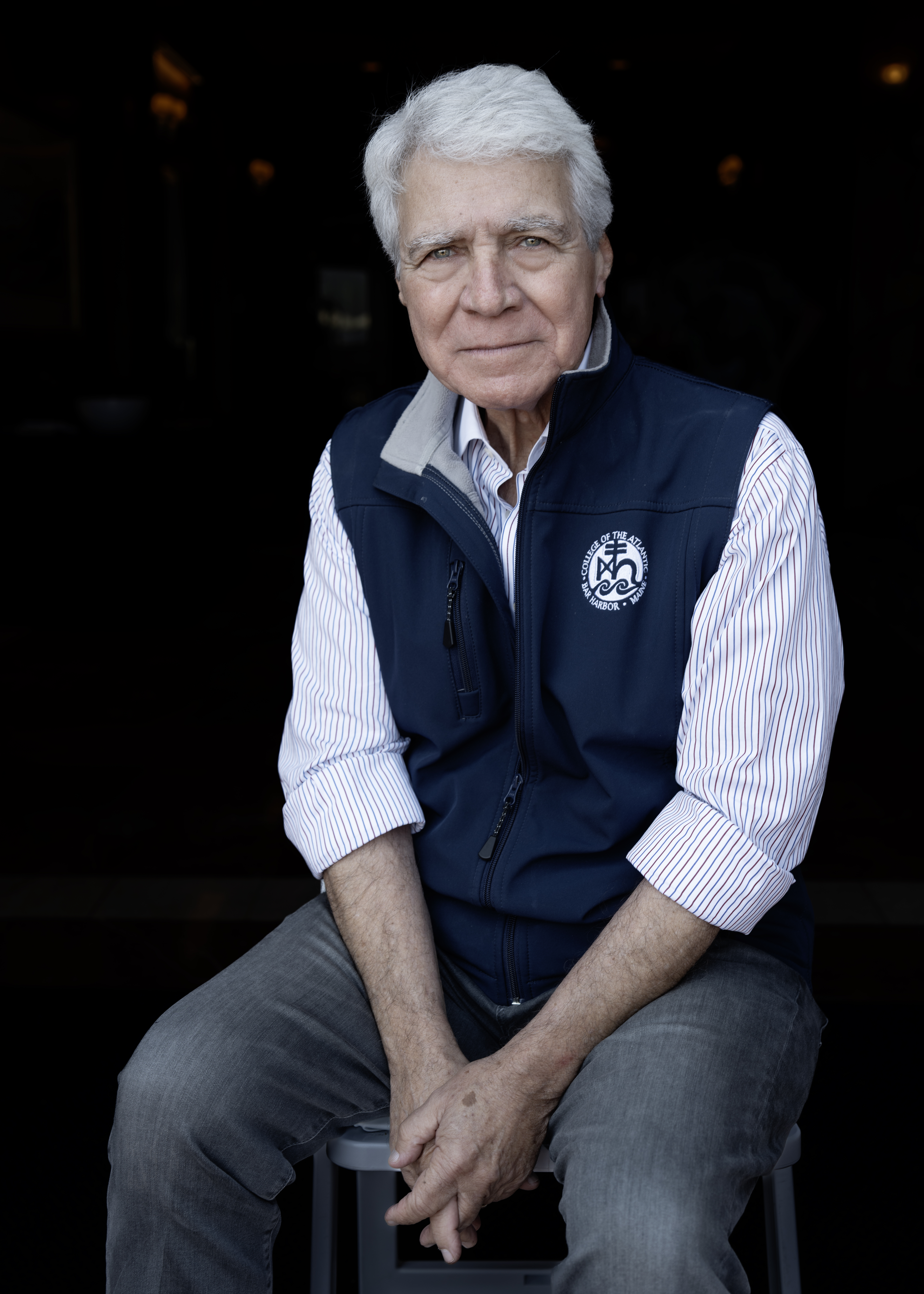
Phil Lader in 2025

He has served as president of Business Executives for National Security, chairman of the Board of Visitors of Duke University’s Sanford Institute of Public Policy and the Royal Academy of Arts American Trust, a member of Harvard Law School's Visiting Committee, Columbia University's International Advisory Board, Yale Divinity School's advisory board, and Brown University's Watson Institute for International and Public Affairs Advisory Board, and the founding Council of the Rothermere American Institute at Oxford University. In South Carolina, he was a trustee of Middleton Place Foundation (America's oldest landscaped gardens) and Liberty Fellows and was chairman of the South Carolina Small & Minority Business Council, a trustee of South Carolina State Colleges, and a director of the South Carolina Jobs-Economic Development Authority, First Carolina Bank, and the South Carolina Chamber of Commerce.

=== Honors ===
Lader has been awarded honorary doctorates by 14 universities. For his contributions to trans-Atlantic relations, the Royal Society for the Arts, Manufactures and Commerce awarded him the 2001 Benjamin Franklin Medal, and he received the Rotary International Foundation's 2007 Global Service to Humanity Award and British-American Business' 2016 Founders Award.

Political offices
Preceded by Erskine Bowles	Administrator of the Small Business Administration; 1994–1997	Succeeded by Ginger Lew; Acting
Diplomatic posts
Preceded by William Crowe	United States Ambassador to the United Kingdom; 1997–2001	Succeeded by William Farish
