= 1978 United States House of Representatives elections in South Carolina =

- November 7, 1978

All 6 South Carolina seats to the United States House of Representatives
	Majority party	Minority party
Party	Democratic	Republican
Last election	5	1
Seats won	4	2
Seat change	▼1	▲1
District results
Democratic
60–70%
80–90%
>90%
Republican
50–60%

The 1978 United States House of Representatives elections in South Carolina were held on November 7, 1978, to select six Representatives for two-year terms from the state of South Carolina. The primary elections for the Democrats and the Republicans were held on June 13. All five incumbents who ran were re-elected, but the open seat in the 4th congressional district was taken by the Republicans from the Democrats. The composition of the state delegation after the elections was four Democrats and two Republicans.

== 1st congressional district ==
Incumbent Democratic Congressman Mendel Jackson Davis of the 1st congressional district, in office since 1971, defeated Benjamin Frasier in the Democratic primary and Republican C.C. Wannamaker in the general election.

=== Democratic primary ===
Democratic primary
Candidate	Votes	%
Mendel Jackson Davis	48,541	86.4
Benjamin Frasier	7,631	13.6

=== General election results ===
South Carolina's 1st congressional district election results, 1978
Party	Candidate	Votes	%	±%
Democratic	Mendel J. Davis (incumbent)	65,835	60.6	−8.3
Republican	C.C. Wannamaker	42,811	39.4	+8.3
Majority		23,024	21.2	−16.6
Turnout		108,646		
Democratic hold				

== 2nd congressional district ==
Incumbent Republican Congressman Floyd Spence of the 2nd congressional district, in office since 1971, defeated Democratic challenger Jack Bass.

=== Democratic primary ===
Democratic primary
Candidate	Votes	%
Jack Bass	34,630	57.6
B.E. Hadley	25,520	42.4

=== General election results ===
South Carolina's 2nd congressional district election results, 1978
Party	Candidate	Votes	%	±%
Republican	Floyd Spence (incumbent)	71,208	57.3	−0.2
Democratic	Jack Bass	53,021	42.7	+0.9
No party	Write-Ins	4	0.0	0.0
Majority		18,187	14.6	−1.1
Turnout		124,233		
Republican hold				

== 3rd congressional district ==
Incumbent Democratic Congressman Butler Derrick of the 3rd congressional district, in office since 1975, defeated Republican challenger Anthony J. Panuccio.

=== General election results ===
South Carolina's 3rd congressional district election results, 1978
Party	Candidate	Votes	%	±%
Democratic	Butler Derrick (incumbent)	81,638	81.9	−18.1
Republican	Anthony J. Panuccio	17,973	18.1	+18.1
No party	Write-Ins	24	0.0	0.0
Majority		63,665	63.8	−36.2
Turnout		99,635		
Democratic hold				

== 4th congressional district ==
Incumbent Democratic Congressman James R. Mann of the 4th congressional district, in office since 1969, opted to retire. Carroll A. Campbell Jr., a Republican state senator from Greenville, defeated Robert Watkins in the Republican primary and Democrat Max M. Heller in the general election.

=== Democratic primary ===
Democratic primary
Candidate	Votes	%
Max M. Heller	25,295	53.1
Nick Theodore	22,319	46.9

=== Republican primary ===
Republican primary
Candidate	Votes	%
Carroll A. Campbell Jr.	6,808	88.3
Robert Watkins	899	11.7

=== General election results ===
South Carolina's 4th congressional district election results, 1978
Party	Candidate	Votes	%	±%
Republican	Carroll A. Campbell Jr.	51,377	52.1	+25.6
Democratic	Max M. Heller	45,484	46.2	−27.3
Independent	Don W. Sprouse	1,693	1.7	+1.7
No party	Write-Ins	34	0.0	0.0
Majority		5,893	5.9	−41.1
Turnout		98,588		
Republican gain from Democratic				

== 5th congressional district ==
Incumbent Democratic Congressman Kenneth Lamar Holland of the 5th congressional district, in office since 1975, defeated Colleen H. Yates in the Democratic primary and Independent Harold Hough in the general election.

=== Democratic primary ===
Democratic primary
Candidate	Votes	%
Ken Holland	46,247	65.0
Colleen H. Yates	24,853	35.0

=== General election results ===
South Carolina's 5th congressional district election results, 1978
Party	Candidate	Votes	%	±%
Democratic	Ken Holland (incumbent)	63,538	82.6	+31.1
Independent	Harold Hough	13,251	17.2	+17.0
No party	Write-Ins	175	0.2	+0.2
Majority		50,287	65.4	+62.2
Turnout		76,964		
Democratic hold				

== 6th congressional district ==
Incumbent Democratic Congressman John Jenrette of the 6th congressional district, in office since 1975, defeated Jeryl Best in the Democratic primary and was unopposed in the general election.

=== Democratic primary ===
Democratic primary
Candidate	Votes	%
John Jenrette	58,320	76.9
Jeryl Best	17,541	23.1

=== General election results ===
South Carolina's 6th congressional district election results, 1978
Party	Candidate	Votes	%	±%
Democratic	John Jenrette (incumbent)	69,372	99.7	+44.2
No party	Write-Ins	222	0.3	+0.3
Majority		69,150	99.4	+87.9
Turnout		69,594		
Democratic hold				

== See also ==
- 1978 United States House of Representatives elections
- 1978 United States Senate election in South Carolina
- 1978 South Carolina gubernatorial election
- South Carolina's congressional districts
