= Carroll A. Campbell Jr. =

American politician (1940–2005)

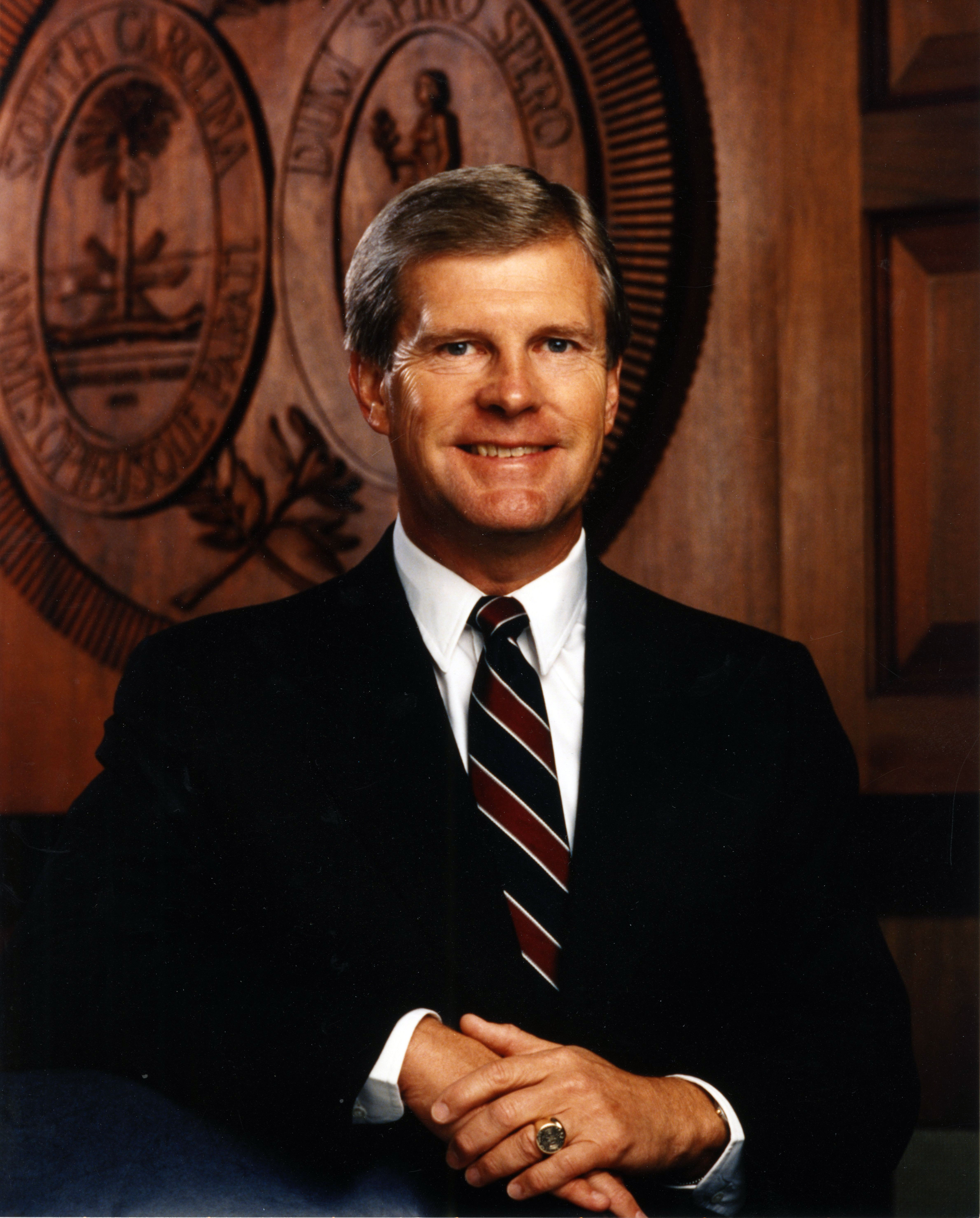
- Campbell, c. 1987

112th Governor of South Carolina
- In office January 14, 1987 – January 11, 1995
- Lieutenant: Nick Theodore
- Preceded by: Richard Riley
- Succeeded by: David Beasley

Chair of the National Governors Association
- In office August 17, 1993 – July 19, 1994
- Preceded by: Roy Romer
- Succeeded by: Howard Dean

Member of the U.S. House of Representatives from South Carolina's 4th district
- In office January 3, 1979 – January 3, 1987
- Preceded by: James Mann
- Succeeded by: Liz J. Patterson

Member of the South Carolina Senate from the 2nd district
- In office January 11, 1977 – November 6, 1978
- Preceded by: Richard Riley
- Succeeded by: Jeff Richardson

Member of the South Carolina House of Representatives from Greenville County
- In office December 1970 – December 1974
- Preceded by: Thomas Wesley Greene
- Succeeded by: None (district eliminated)

Personal details
- Born: Carroll Ashmore Campbell Jr. July 24, 1940 Greenville, South Carolina, U.S.
- Died: December 7, 2005 (aged 65) West Columbia, South Carolina, U.S.
- Party: Republican
- Spouse: Iris Rhodes (m. 1959)
- Children: 2
- Education: University of South Carolina, Columbia; American University (MA)

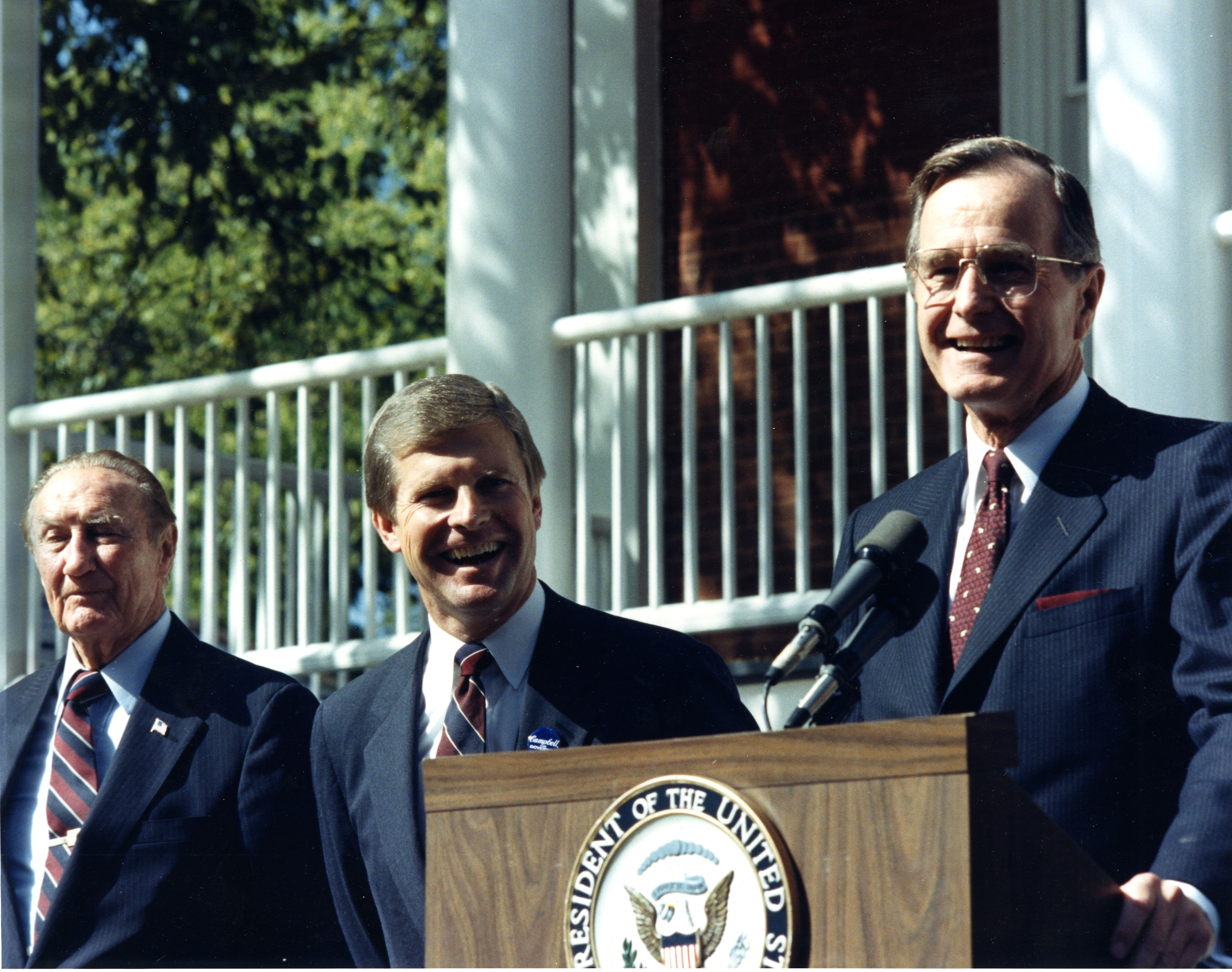
Campbell at a 1986 campaign rally, with Vice President George H. W. Bush and Senator Strom Thurmond

Carroll Ashmore Campbell Jr. (July 24, 1940 – December 7, 2005), was an American Republican politician who served as the 112th governor of South Carolina from 1987 to 1995. Prior to this, he served as a member of the South Carolina Senate representing the 2nd district from 1977 to 1978 and as a congressman representing South Carolina's 4th district from 1979 to 1987.

== Early life ==
Campbell was born in Greenville, South Carolina, the oldest of six children. His father, Carroll A. Campbell Sr. worked in the textile mills and the furniture business, and later owned a motel in Garden City, South Carolina.

Campbell grew up in Greenville and the nearby cities of Liberty and Simpsonville. He attended Greenville Senior High School, dropping out during a period that The Greenville News characterized as an "unsettled adolescence amid a disintegrating family"; his uncle then enrolled him at the private McCallie School in Chattanooga, Tennessee. He attended the University of South Carolina at Columbia but withdrew because of financial concerns and later graduated with a Master of Arts degree from American University. While a student at South Carolina, he became a member of the Sigma chapter of the Pi Kappa Phi fraternity.

== Early political career ==
In 1970, Campbell took a leading role opposing the racial integration of public schools in Greenville. He spoke to a crowd of thousands in front of Parker High School against integration, and on January 25 he led a motorcade of 800 vehicles to the state capitol in Columbia to protest "forced busing" of students to integrated schools.

Campbell served in the South Carolina House of Representatives from 1970 to 1974 during the administration of Governor John C. West, who defeated Republican nominee Albert Watson, the choice of U.S. Senator Strom Thurmond, in the 1970 South Carolina gubernatorial election. With Lee Atwater as a key political strategist, he made an unsuccessful bid for lieutenant governor in 1974 running to serve alongside Republican gubernatorial nominee James B. Edwards of Charleston. While Edwards was elected, Campbell lost to Democrat Brantley Harvey; despite the loss Campbell would continue to seek Atwater's counsel throughout his career.

From 1976 to 1978, during the Edwards administration, he served in the South Carolina Senate. In between his two stints in the General Assembly, he served as executive assistant to Governor Edwards. In 1978, Campbell won election to the United States House of Representatives from the Greenville-based South Carolina's 4th congressional district; he defeated Max M. Heller, the Democratic mayor of Greenville and an immigrant from Austria, to fill the seat vacated by the retiring James Mann. Campbell hence became the first Republican to hold the 4th district seat since Reconstruction. Campbell served as state campaign chairman for Ronald Reagan's presidential campaign in 1980 and 1984, and as southern regional chairman for George H. W. Bush's presidential campaign in 1988.

== Governor of South Carolina (1987–1995) ==
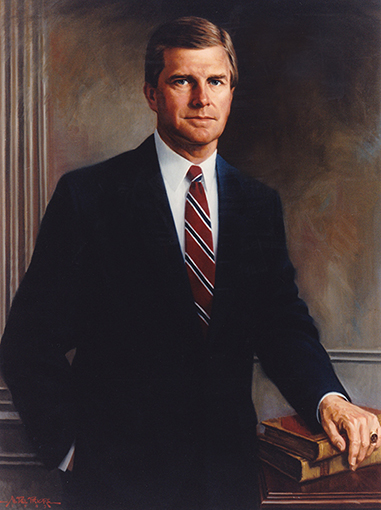
Portrait of Campbell

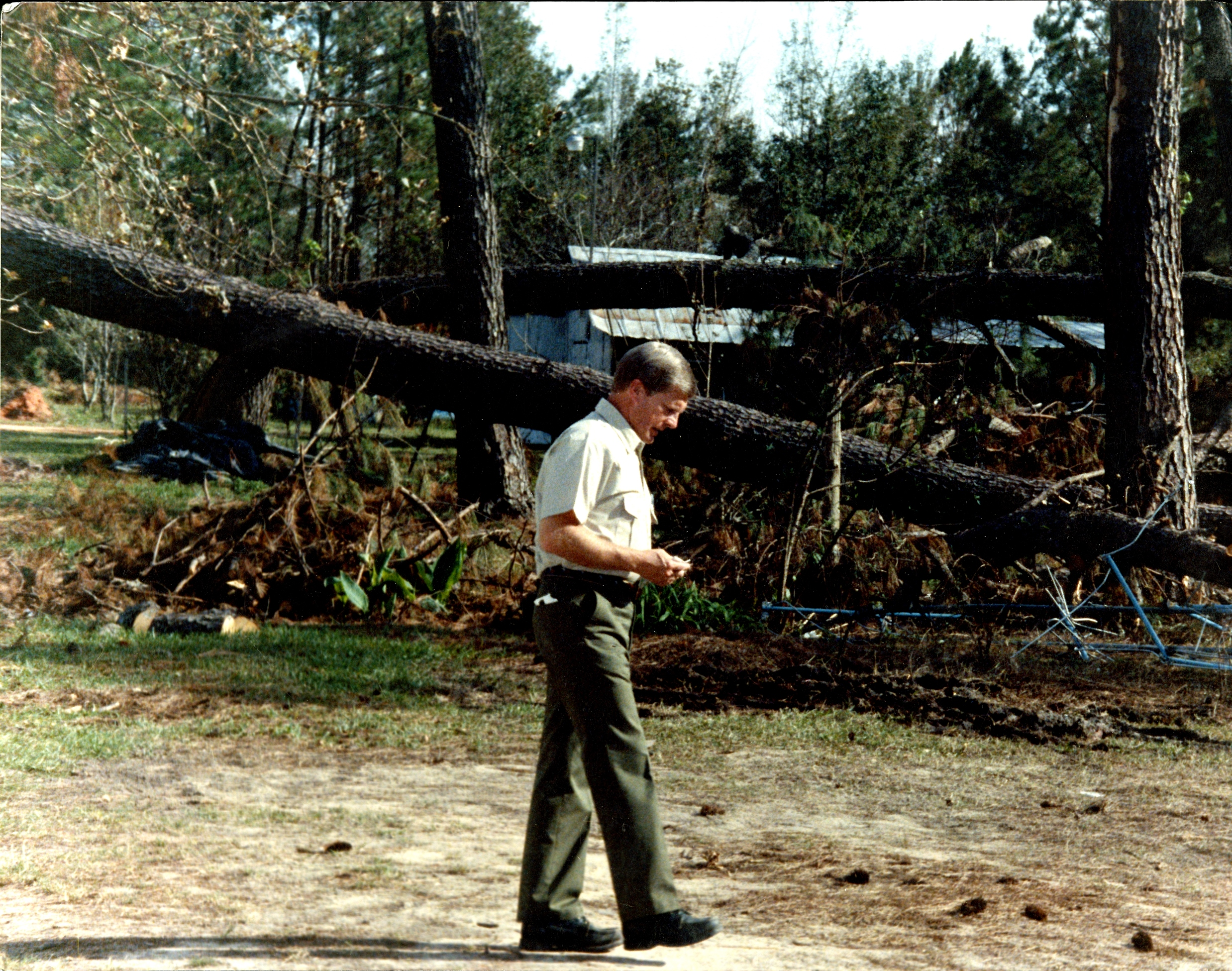
Gov. Campbell tours the wreckage after Hurricane Hugo

As governor, Campbell coordinated the state's response to Hurricane Hugo in 1989. Campbell was also known for his role in luring BMW to build its first U.S. manufacturing facility in Greer, South Carolina. In recognition of his role, in 2002 it was announced that BMW had donated $10 million for a facility at the site of Clemson University's International Center for Automotive Research. Like nearly all such large donations, it came with naming rights: the company chose to call the new facility the Carroll A. Campbell Jr. Graduate Engineering Center.

When Campbell was governor, the state was confronted with two major controversies shaking taxpayers' confidence in the trustworthiness of public officials. Allegations of financial mismanagement at the University of South Carolina led to university president James B. Holderman's resignation. Operation Lost Trust, a federal investigation of bribery and drug use allegations against members of the South Carolina General Assembly, led to convictions of twenty-seven legislators, lobbyists and others in a vote-buying scandal.

During 1993–1994, Campbell was the chairman of the National Governors Association.

Term limits prevented him from seeking a third term in the 1994 election. He left office with a job approval rating of 72 percent.

== Subsequent career ==
Near the end of his term, there was speculation that Campbell would be a candidate for President of the United States in 1996. However, citing long odds and the lengthy commitment it would be, he announced he wouldn't run on June 3, 1994. From 1995 to 2001, Campbell was a Washington, D.C. lobbyist, serving as president and CEO of the American Council of Life Insurers.

Following his decision not to run for president, Campbell was mentioned as a possible vice presidential running mate for Bob Dole. Campbell even used the speculation to convince South Carolina legislators to support Dole. He was ultimately passed over in favor of Jack Kemp, the former U.S. Representative from New York's 31st congressional district and United States Secretary of Housing and Urban Development under President George H. W. Bush.

In 1998, Campbell and former South Carolina First Lady Lois Rhame West became the co-chairs of Winthrop University's first capital campaign. Under Campbell and West, the campaign raised more than $30 million.

In 2001, Campbell declined offers from George W. Bush to serve as U.S. Ambassador to Saudi Arabia or the U.S. Ambassador to Australia due to a lack of interest.

== Personal life ==
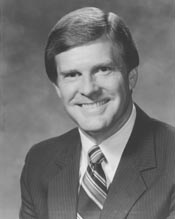
Campbell during his time in Congress

Campbell eloped with Iris Faye Rhodes in 1959. They had two sons, Carroll Campbell III, and Mike Campbell, the former of whom unsuccessfully sought the 2010 Republican nomination for South Carolina's 1st congressional district to succeed Representative Henry Brown; and the latter of whom was an unsuccessful candidate for Lieutenant Governor of South Carolina in 2006. The family owns franchises for Wendy's restaurants in South Carolina.

In October 2001, at the age of 61, Campbell was diagnosed with Alzheimer's disease. The revelation forced him to abandon plans to run for governor again in 2002. He was admitted to a long-term residential treatment facility for Alzheimer's patients in August 2005. He died of a heart attack on December 7 of that year at Lexington Medical Center in West Columbia. After lying in state at the State House, he was eulogized at memorial services at Trinity Episcopal Cathedral in Columbia and at All Saints Episcopal Church in Pawleys Island. He was buried in the church cemetery of All Saints Episcopal Church.

Upon Campbell's death, David Wilkins, U.S. Ambassador to Canada and former Speaker of the South Carolina House of Representatives, described him as "the master architect" of the South Carolina Republican Party's speedy rise to dominance.

== Election history ==
1986 South Carolina Governor

- Carroll Campbell (Republican), 51%
- Michael R. Daniel (Democrat), 47%

1990 South Carolina Governor

- Carroll Campbell (Republican), 69%
- Theo Mitchell (Democrat), 27%

== External links and general sources ==
- Carroll Campbell Bio, Education, Occupations, Timeline of Major Events and Accomplishments, Election Results, SCIway.net; accessed August 4, 2017.
- Biography from the Biographical Directory of the United States Congress; accessed August 4, 2017.
- Former S.C. governor has Alzheimer's, an October 2001 USA Today article; accessed August 4, 2017.
- "It's been a really bad day". Archived from the original on March 10, 2007., a December 7, 2005 blog entry from Campbell's former Chief of Staff
- Biography of Carroll A. Campbell Jr., National Governors Association website; accessed August 4, 2017.
- Appearances on C-SPAN
- Carroll Ashmore Campbell, Jr. Papers at South Carolina Political Collections (University of South Carolina)
- Carroll Campbell Papers (Mss. 0087) at Clemson University
- Governor Carroll A. Campbell, Jr. Papers (RG 555000) at the South Carolina Department of Archives and History
- 1987 Carroll Campbell Swearing in Ceremony on South Carolina Educational Television
- 1991 Carroll Campbell Swearing in Ceremony on South Carolina Educational Television

Party political offices
Preceded by James M. Henderson	Republican nominee for Lieutenant Governor of South Carolina; 1974	Succeeded by John Stroud
Preceded by W. D. Workman	Republican nominee for Governor of South Carolina; 1986, 1990	Succeeded by David Beasley
Preceded by John Ashcroft	Chair of the Republican Governors Association; 1990–1991	Succeeded by Tommy Thompson
U.S. House of Representatives
Preceded by James Mann	Member of the U.S. House of Representatives from South Carolina's 4th congressional district 1979–1987	Succeeded by Liz J. Patterson
Political offices
Preceded by Richard Riley	Governor of South Carolina; 1987–1995	Succeeded by David Beasley
Preceded by Roy Romer	Chair of the National Governors Association; 1993–1994	Succeeded by Howard Dean
