= Iris Campbell =

First Lady of South Carolina from 1987 to 1995

First Lady of South Carolina
- In office January 14, 1987 – January 11, 1995
- Governor: Carroll A. Campbell Jr.
- Preceded by: Ann Riley
- Succeeded by: Mary Wood Beasley

Personal details
- Born: Iris Faye Rhodes; February 12, 1940 Greenville, South Carolina
- Died: November 20, 2017 (aged 77) DeBordieu, South Carolina
- Spouse: Carroll A. Campbell Jr. (m. 1959–2005; his death)
- Children: Two sons

Iris Faye Campbell (February 12, 1940 – November 20, 2017) was an American health advocate and politician who served as the First Lady of South Carolina from 1987 to 1995. Campbell was the widow of South Carolina Governor Carroll A. Campbell Jr., and became an activist on behalf of Alzheimer's disease patients following his 2005 death from the illness. She remained a highly influential figure in South Carolinian political and state Republican Party circles long after leaving her position in the Governor's Mansion. Her endorsements were sought after by major Republican U.S. presidential and state gubernatorial candidates.

== Biography ==
Campbell was born Iris Rhodes on February 12, 1940, in Greenville, South Carolina, to Archelious Talmadge Rhodes and Sue Nell Cox Rhodes. She met her future husband, Carroll Campbell, while working at a drug store lunch counter in Greenville. They married in 1959 while both were still teenagers. The couple had two sons, Michael Campbell and Carroll A. Campbell III.

Campbell served as First Lady of South Carolina for two terms from 1987 to 1995 during the tenure of Governor Campbell. She focused on programs and initiatives to benefit women and children, especially those with special needs. Campbell promoted a horsebacking riding program for kids with disabilities and hosted an annual Easter egg hunt at Palmetto Health Children's Hospital. She also championed the American Cancer Society and sought to increase public awareness on the need for smoke detectors. In a 2001 interview with The State, Campbell stated that she hoped her legacy as first lady would be her work with children, telling the newspaper, "When you're the first lady, everybody wants you to chair something or be involved in different things. I felt if I kept my concern to one thing – children and families – I could be the most effective."

Former Governor Carroll A. Campbell Jr. died from complications of Alzheimer's disease in 2005. Iris Campbell became an advocate for Alzeheimer's treatment and research following her husband's death. She appeared at events and created a golf tournament to raise funds to seek a cure for the disease.

Iris Campbell also became a political figure following Governor Campbell's death. During the 2000s and 2010s, she became a prominent Republican figure during South Carolina's elections. Her endorsement was pursued by Republican U.S. presidential candidates during the important South Carolina presidential primaries, which take place early in the election year. Campbell endorsed former Arkansas Governor Mike Huckabee during the 2008 presidential primary and then gave her endorsement to former Utah Governor Jon Huntsman during the 2012 primaries. Most recently, Campbell publicly supported former Florida Governor Jeb Bush during the heated 2016 South Carolina Republican primary.

In 2010, Campbell endorsed then-State Representative Nikki Haley in that year's gubernatorial election. Haley won both the Republican primary and the general election.

In addition to her endorsements, the former first lady remained engaged in day-to-day state politics. During the 2010s, Iris Campbell spearheaded an effort to restructure South Carolina's state government. Campbell's efforts to pass the proposed legislation proved successful and resulted in the creation of the new Department of Administration. In 2014 bill signing ceremony, Governor Nikki Haley specifically honored Campbell for her contributions to the new law and the creation of the department. Haley gifted the first pen used in the bill signing ceremony to Campbell.

Iris Campbell died in her sleep, following a short illness, at her home in DeBordieu, South Carolina, on November 20, 2017, at the age of 77. She was survived by her two sons, Michael Campbell and Carroll A. Campbell III, and four grandchildren. Her funeral was held at All Saints Episcopal Church in Pawleys Island, South Carolina, on November 27, 2017. She was buried next to her husband in the All Saints Episcopal Church cemetery.

Honorary titles
| Preceded by Ann Riley | First Lady of South Carolina; 1987–1995 | Succeeded by Mary Wood Beasley |
