= South Carolina Education Improvement Act of 1984 =

South Carolina legislative act

Education Improvement Act
- Long title: An act to enact the South Carolina Education Improvement Act of 1984
- Acronyms (colloquial): EIA
- Nicknames: Education Improvement Act (EIA)
- Effective: June 28, 1984

Codification
- Acts amended: Education Finance Act of 1977

Legislative history
- Introduced in the House on 1984; Passed the House on 1984 (70–16); Passed the Senate on 1984 (32–19)

The South Carolina Education Improvement Act of 1984, known informally as the EIA, is a landmark South Carolina statute enacted by the state legislature and signed into law by governor Richard Riley on June 28, 1984. It is recognized as being one of the most robust education reform efforts to occur at the state-level in the United States.

The EIA authorized more than 60 provisions aimed at incentivizing high performance among students and teachers and increasing accountability and oversight in districts and schools.

Rolled out over the course of five years, provisions included new programs to help underperforming students improve in reading, math, and science; to create teacher and principal incentive pay programs; and to implement a school improvement award program.

== Legislative history ==
In the early 1980s, South Carolina ranked near or at the bottom among states for a variety of education and quality-of-life indicators, including 47th in percentage of high school graduates, 49th in per capita income, and 50th in SAT scores.

Previously, in 1977, South Carolina passed the Education Finance Act (EFA), which put into place a fiscal foundation for the funding of public schools and equalized the weighted per-pupil distribution of state funds across districts. Expanding upon the EFA, governor Riley sought to address student achievement gaps and a lagging economy through further education reform efforts.

Initially, Riley attempted to push through a modest school improvement proposal in the 1983 session of the General Assembly. The bill failed to pass due to concerns over its proposed tax increase and its incremental approach.

Later that year, however, the United States National Commission on Excellence in Education published A Nation at Risk, a report that called for significant reform to the United States education system. Leveraging the widespread sense of urgency spurred by the report, Riley drew up a political strategy for a new, more ambitious bill that mobilized both the grassroots and the “grasstops.”

With the legislative proposal calling for a penny-on-the-dollar sales tax increase, the advocacy campaign operated under the slogan, “A penny for their thoughts.” The campaign sought the direct involvement of the public, hosting more than 13,000 South Carolina residents in a series of public forums across the state.

To gain bipartisan support, the campaign also appointed business, political, and education leaders to committees, one that focused on the financing of the legislation and another that focused on the concerns and desires of the business community.

Prior to the start of the 1984 legislative session, only 22 of 124 South Carolina House of Representatives members supported the bill, once again citing concerns about a proposed tax increase. Additionally, several proposed provisions, such as performance bonuses for educators, were contentious. After several revisions, the proposal passed 70-16 in the South Carolina House before passing 32-19 in the South Carolina Senate. The Education Improvement Act was signed into law on June 28, 1984 with the one-percentage-point increase in state sales tax intact.

== Impact ==
In the five-year period after it was signed into law, the Education Improvement Act produced a number of results, including:

- A significant increase in average SAT scores, especially among black students
- Increased availability of four-year-old pre-kindergarten for lower-income families, a program that would be identified as a national model by the National Governors Association
- A doubling of enrollment in “gateway courses” deemed important for college admission and academic success, such as those in chemistry, foreign languages, and Advanced Placement

South Carolina saw considerable economic growth in the 1980s and 1990s after the passage of the EIA. Between 1984 and 1993, more than 185 foreign companies established operations in the state, generating more than 40,000 new jobs.

== Legacy ==
A study by the RAND Corporation, a global policy think tank, pronounced the EIA as “the most comprehensive single piece of legislation improving education to come out of any state.”

In 2008, the legislature approved a cut in the state’s overall education spending. EIA monies have since been used to pay for education expenditures that were previously covered by general fund revenues; however, the EIA account continues to be maintained as a separate, dedicated revenue line for education in the state. As of fiscal year 2021-22, the EIA generates nearly $900 million in new monies annually.
