= 1994 South Carolina gubernatorial election =

- November 8, 1994
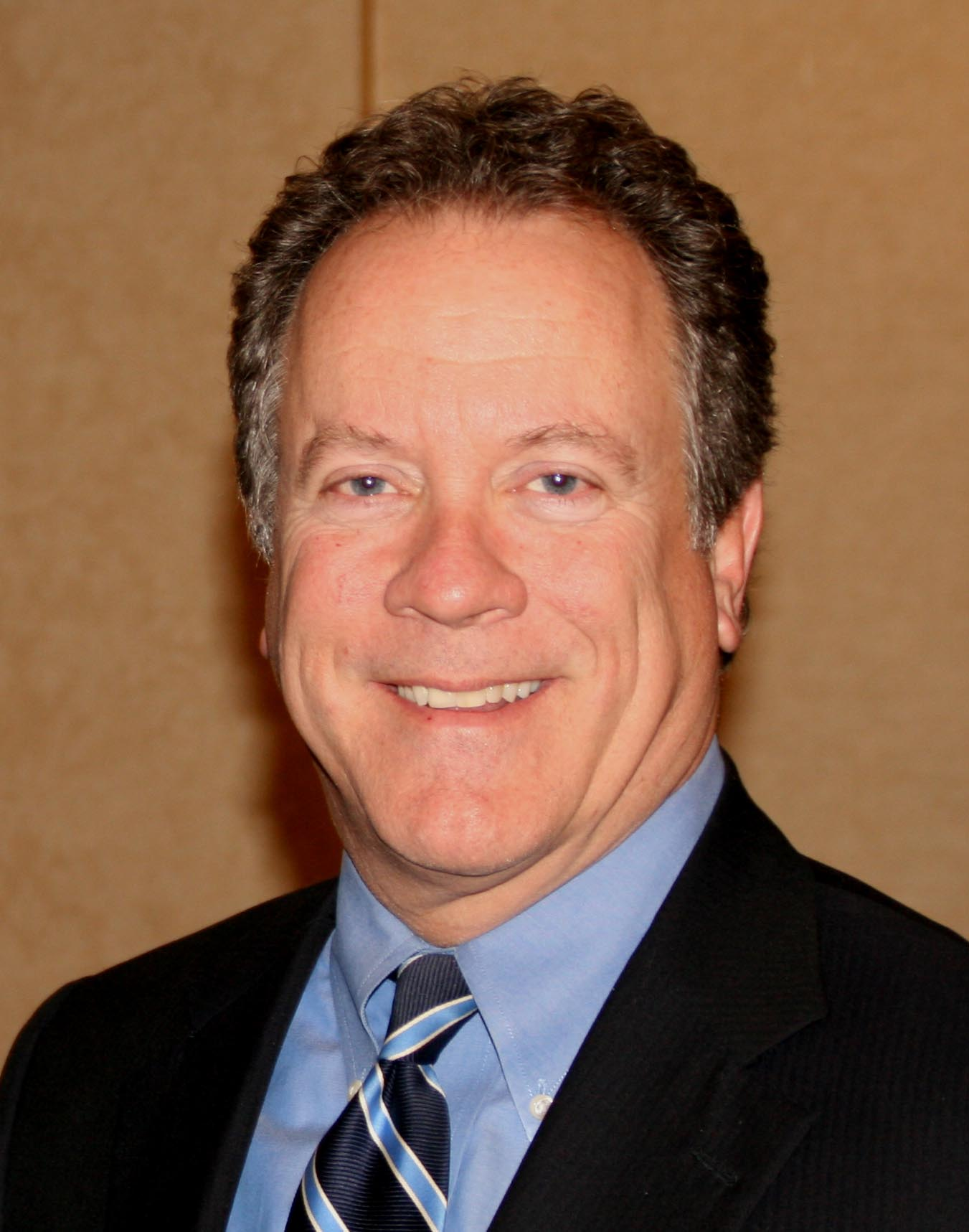

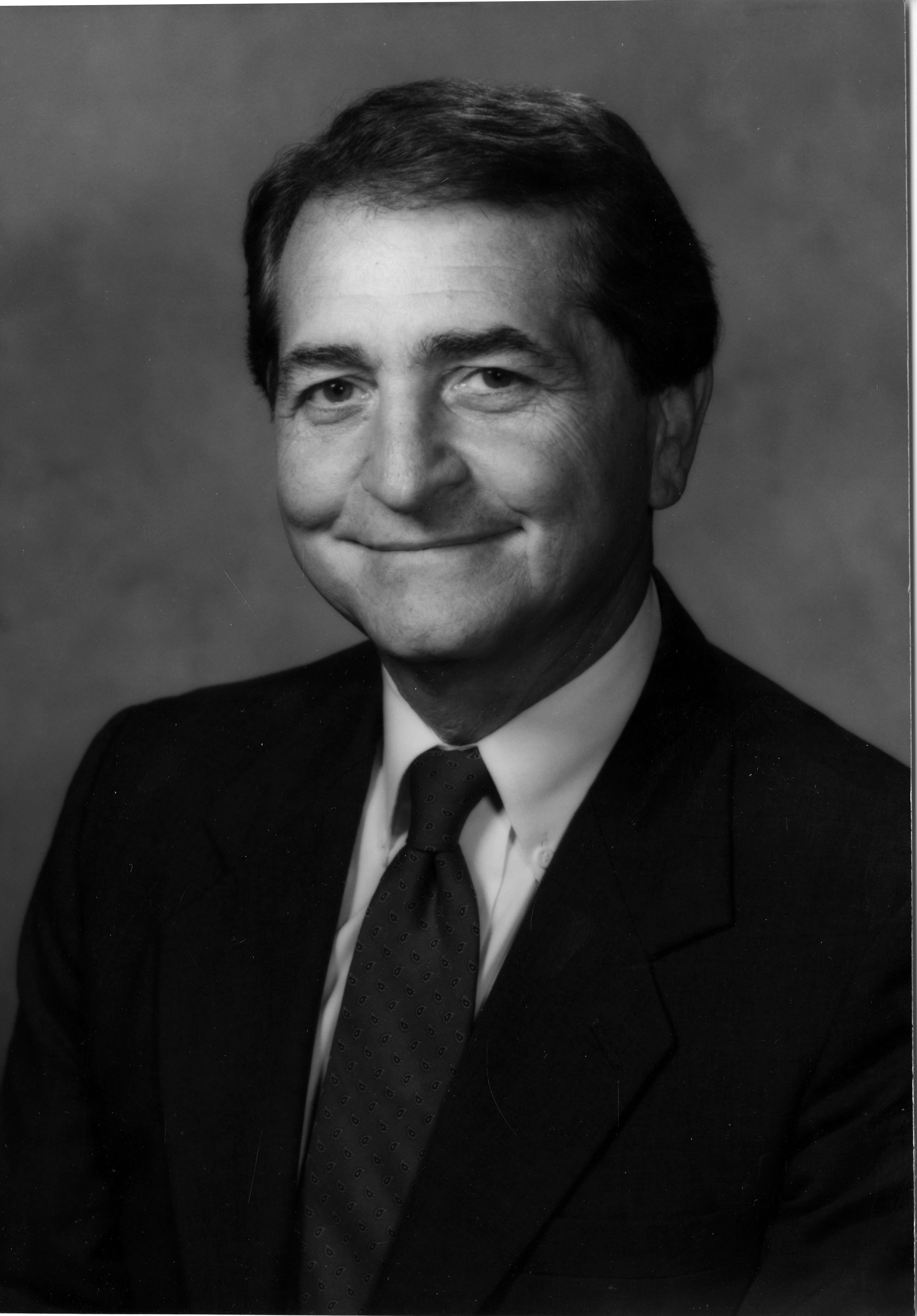
Nominee	David Beasley	Nick Theodore
Party	Republican	Democratic
Popular vote	470,756	447,002
Percentage	50.41%	47.87%
- County results Beasley: 40–50% 50–60% 60–70% Theodore: 40–50% 50–60% 60–70%
Governor before election
Carroll A. Campbell Jr.
Republican
Elected Governor
David Beasley
Republican

The 1994 South Carolina gubernatorial election was held on November 8, 1994, to select the governor of the state of South Carolina. The contest featured two politicians from the Upstate and David Beasley narrowly defeated Nick Theodore to become the 113th governor of South Carolina.

== Democratic primary ==
The South Carolina Democratic Party held their primary for governor on August 9, 1994. Lieutenant Governor Nick Theodore, from the Upstate, emerged as the winner of the runoff election on August 23 against popular Charleston mayor Joseph P. (Joe) Riley Jr. and the three-term Attorney General of South Carolina, Thomas T. Medlock.

=== Candidates ===
- William Holler
- Thomas T. Medlock, Attorney General of South Carolina
- Joseph P. Riley Jr., mayor of Charleston
- Nick Theodore, Lieutenant Governor of South Carolina

=== Results ===
1994 Democratic gubernatorial primary
Party	Candidate	Votes	%
Democratic	Nick Theodore	129,572	49.56%
Democratic	Joseph P. Riley Jr.	99,967	38.24%
Democratic	Thomas T. Medlock	22,468	8.59%
Democratic	William Holler	9,439	3.61%
Total votes		261,446	100.00%

=== Runoff results ===
1994 Democratic gubernatorial runoff
Party	Candidate	Votes	%	±%
Democratic	Nick Theodore	113,127	50.36%	▲0.80
Democratic	Joseph P. Riley Jr.	111,517	49.64%	▲11.20
Total votes		224,644	100.00%	

== Republican primary ==
The South Carolina Republican Party held their primary on August 9, 1994, and the contest featured state representative David Beasley from the Upstate against two Lowcountry politicians. Beasley cruised to victory and benefited from the campaign of popular Charleston mayor Joe Riley for the Democratic nomination by drawing Lowcountry voters away from the Republican primary and towards the Democratic primary.

=== Candidates ===
- David Beasley, state representative from Society Hill
- Thomas Hartnett, former U.S. representative from Charleston
- Arthur Ravenel Jr., U.S. representative from Charleston

=== Results ===
1994 Republican gubernatorial primary
Party	Candidate	Votes	%
Republican	David Beasley	119,724	47.19%
Republican	Arthur Ravenel Jr.	81,129	31.98%
Republican	Thomas Hartnett	52,866	20.84%
Total votes		253,719	100.00%

=== Runoff results ===
1994 Republican gubernatorial runoff
Party	Candidate	Votes	%	±%
Republican	David Beasley	134,297	57.59%	▲10.40
Republican	Arthur Ravenel Jr.	98,915	42.41%	▲10.43
Total votes		233,212	100.00%	

== General election ==
=== Polling ===
Source	Date	Beasley (R)	Theodore (D)
The Greenville News	Nov. 3, 1994	38%	34%

=== Results ===
The general election was held on November 8, 1994, and David Beasley was elected as the next governor of South Carolina in the closest election percentage wise since the disputed election of 1876. Turnout was higher than the previous gubernatorial election because of the competitive nature of the race between the two parties.

South Carolina Gubernatorial Election, 1994
Party	Candidate	Votes	%	±%
Republican	David Beasley	470,756	50.41	−19.1
Democratic	Nick Theodore	447,002	47.87	+20.1
U.S. Taxpayers Party	John R. Peeples, Jr.	8,003	0.9	+0.9
New Alliance Party	Wayne B. Griffin	5,875	0.6	+0.6
No party	Write-Ins	2,214	0.2	−0.2
Majority		23,754	2.5	−39.2
Turnout		933,850	62.3	+6.3
Republican hold				

== See also ==
- Governor of South Carolina
- List of governors of South Carolina
- South Carolina gubernatorial elections

Preceded by 1990	South Carolina gubernatorial elections	Succeeded by 1998
