= W. Brantley Harvey Sr. =

American lawyer and politician

William Brantley Harvey Sr.
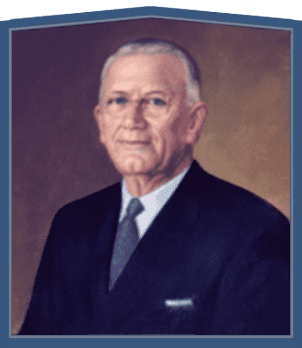
- Painting of W. Brantley Harvey Sr.
- Born: William Brantley Harvey; June 5, 1893; Hampton, South Carolina, U.S.
- Died: March 20, 1981 (aged 87); Beaufort, South Carolina, U.S.
- Education: University of South Carolina
- Occupations: lawyer politician
- Years active: 1924–1952
- Children: W. Brantley Harvey Jr.

William Brantley Harvey Sr. (June 5, 1893 – March 20, 1981) was an American lawyer and politician.

Harvey was the brother of Etta Causey Harvey. She was married to Randolph Murdaugh Sr. (1887–1940) and was mother to Randolph Murdaugh Jr. (1915–1998) and great-grandmother to Alex Murdaugh.

== Biography ==
Harvey was born in Hampton, South Carolina. Harvey served as a medical corpsman in the United States Navy during World War I. In 1923, he received his bachelor's and law degrees from University of South Carolina. Harvey practiced law in Beaufort, South Carolina. Brantley served in the South Carolina House of Representatives from 1924 to 1928 and in the South Carolina Senate from 1928 to 1952. Harvey died in Beaufort, South Carolina. His son was W. Brantley Harvey Jr., who also served in the South Carolina General Assembly.
