= 1986 South Carolina gubernatorial election =

- November 4, 1986
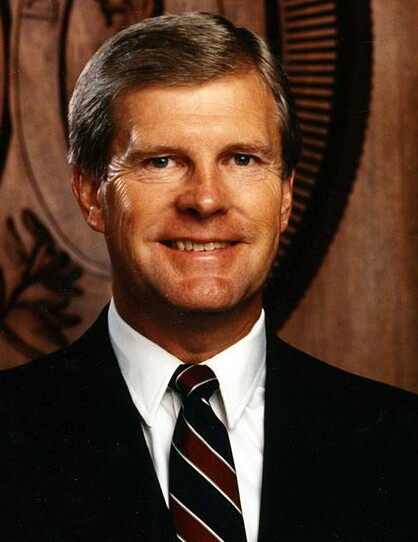

Nominee	Carroll Campbell	Michael R. Daniel
Party	Republican	Democratic
Popular vote	384,565	361,328
Percentage	51.02%	47.94%
- County results Campbell: 50–60% 60–70% 70–80% Daniel: 40–50% 50–60% 60–70%
Governor before election
Richard Riley
Democratic
Elected Governor
Carroll A. Campbell Jr.
Republican

The 1986 South Carolina gubernatorial election was held on November 4, 1986, to select the governor of the state of South Carolina. Carroll A. Campbell Jr., a Republican representative of the 4th congressional district, narrowly defeated Democrat Michael R. Daniel to become the 112th governor of South Carolina and only the second Republican governor since Reconstruction.

== Democratic primary ==
The South Carolina Democratic Party held their primary for governor on June 10. Michael R. Daniel was declared the official candidate for the Democrats despite not obtaining 50% of the vote because second-place finisher, Winthrop University president Philip Lader, declined a runoff election.

Democratic Primary
Candidate	Votes	%
Michael R. Daniel	156,077	47.4
Philip Lader	86,136	26.1
Frank Eppes	59,125	17.9
Hugh Leatherman	28,158	8.5

== Republican primary ==
Carroll A. Campbell, Jr. faced no opposition from South Carolina Republicans and avoided a primary election.

== General election ==
The general election was held on November 4, 1986, and Carroll A. Campbell, Jr. was elected as the next governor of South Carolina in the closest election percentage wise since the disputed election of 1876. Turnout was higher than the previous gubernatorial election because of the increasingly competitive nature of the race between the two parties.

South Carolina Gubernatorial Election, 1986
Party	Candidate	Votes	%	±%
Republican	Carroll A. Campbell, Jr.	384,565	51.02	+20.8
Democratic	Michael R. Daniel	361,328	47.94	−21.9
Libertarian	William Griffin	4,211	0.6	+0.6
American	Millard Smith	3,304	0.4	+0.4
No party	Write-Ins	341	0.1	+0.1
Majority		23,237	3.1	−36.5
Turnout		753,749	57.8	+3.2
Republican gain from Democratic				

== See also ==
- Governor of South Carolina
- List of governors of South Carolina
- South Carolina gubernatorial elections

Preceded by 1982	South Carolina gubernatorial elections	Succeeded by 1990
