= James Robert Mann =

James Robert Mann may refer to:

- James Robert Mann (Illinois politician) (1856–1922), U.S. Representative from Illinois
- James Mann (South Carolina politician) (James Robert Mann, 1920–2010), U.S. Representative from South Carolina
