= Nancy Stevenson =

American politician

83rd Lieutenant Governor of South Carolina
- In office January 10, 1979 – January 12, 1983
- Governor: Richard Riley
- Preceded by: W. Brantley Harvey Jr.
- Succeeded by: Michael R. Daniel

Member of the South Carolina House of Representatives from the 110th district
- In office December 1974 – December 1978
- Preceded by: None (district created)
- Succeeded by: Paul Cantrell

Personal details
- Born: Ferdinan Legare Backer; June 8, 1928 New Rochelle, New York, U.S.
- Died: May 31, 2001 (aged 72) Floyd County, Virginia, U.S.
- Party: Democratic
- Spouses: Olav Ivar Leiv Moltke-Hansen (m. 1950, divorced); Norman Williams Stevenson (m. 1956; died 1999)
- Education: Smith College (BA)

Ferdinan Backer "Nancy" Stevenson (June 8, 1928 – May 31, 2001) was an American politician who served as the 83rd lieutenant governor of South Carolina from 1979 to 1983. She was the first and only woman to be elected to statewide office in South Carolina until the election of Dr. Barbara S. Nielsen as Superintendent of Education in 1990. She previously served two terms in the South Carolina House of Representatives and, after leaving office, unsuccessfully ran for the state's 2nd congressional district seat in 1984 against incumbent Floyd Spence.

== See also ==
- List of female lieutenant governors in the United States

South Carolina House of Representatives
Preceded by None (district created)	South Carolina Representative from the 110th District; 1974–1978	Succeeded by Paul Cantrell
Political offices
Preceded by W. Brantley Harvey Jr.	Lieutenant Governor of South Carolina; 1979–1983	Succeeded by Michael R. Daniel
Party political offices
Preceded by W. Brantley Harvey Jr.	Democratic nominee for Lieutenant Governor of South Carolina; 1978	Succeeded by Michael R. Daniel
