= Jim Hodges =

American politician (born 1956)

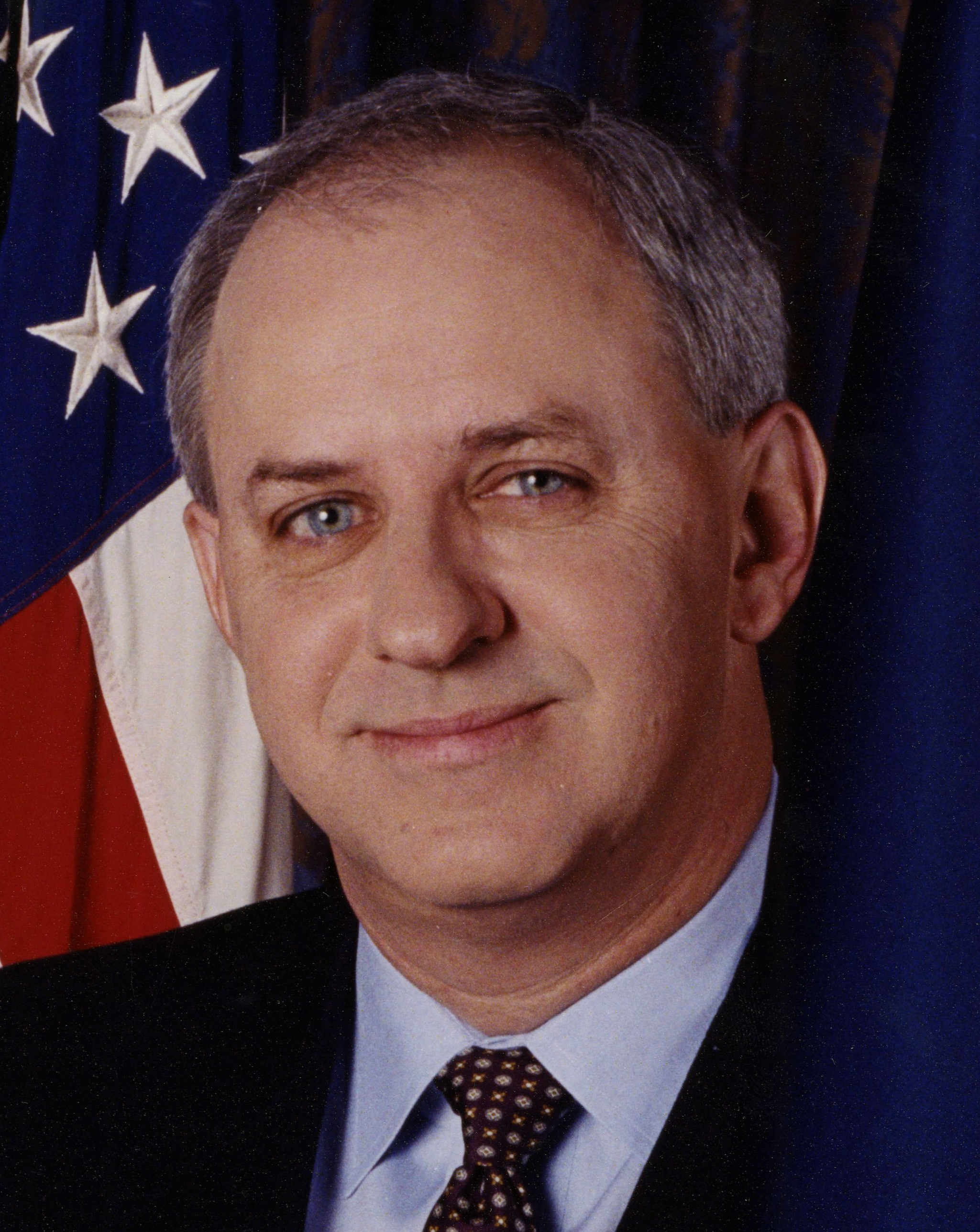

114th Governor of South Carolina
- In office January 13, 1999 – January 15, 2003
- Lieutenant: Bob Peeler
- Preceded by: David Beasley
- Succeeded by: Mark Sanford

Member of the South Carolina House of Representatives from the 45th district
- In office December 2, 1986 – December 5, 1997
- Preceded by: Tom Mangum
- Succeeded by: Eldridge Emory

Personal details
- Born: James Hovis Hodges; November 19, 1956 (age 69) Lancaster, South Carolina, U.S.
- Party: Democratic
- Spouse: Rachel Gardner
- Children: 2
- Education: Davidson College (attended); University of South Carolina (BS, JD)

James Hovis Hodges (born November 19, 1956) is an American businessman, attorney, and politician who served as the 114th governor of South Carolina from 1999 to 2003. A former member of the South Carolina House of Representatives, Hodges is the most recent Democrat to serve as the state's governor.

== Early life and career ==
James Hovis Hodges was born on November 19, 1956, to parents George N. and Betty H. Hodges. He grew up in Lancaster, South Carolina, near the North Carolina border. He attended Davidson College but later transferred to the University of South Carolina, where he completed a BSBA in 1979 and earned election to Phi Beta Kappa. During his undergraduate studies, Hodges worked summers at a cotton mill to pay for his schooling.

In 1982, Hodges received a J.D. from the University of South Carolina School of Law. From 1983 to 1986, Hodges served as Lancaster County Attorney.

== South Carolina House of Representatives ==
At age 30, Hodges first won an election in a December 1986 special election for the 45th district seat in the South Carolina House of Representatives vacated by the late Tom Mangum. While in the House, Hodges served as chair of the House Judiciary Committee from 1992 until 1994 and as House Democratic Leader from 1995 until 1997.

The South Carolina Chamber of Commerce named Hodges "Legislator of the Year" in 1993, and the National Federation of Independent Business bestowed Hodges with its "Guardian of Small Business" award.

While serving in the state legislature, Hodges also worked as general counsel for The Springs Company.

== Governor of South Carolina (1999–2003) ==
=== 1998 gubernatorial election ===
Hodges entered the 1998 gubernatorial election in South Carolina an underdog but took advantage of controversy and missteps by incumbent Republican governor David Beasley, namely Beasley's indecisiveness on allowing a Confederate flag to fly at the state capitol and call to eliminate video poker. Donations from video gambling interests helped Hodges narrow a near million-dollar fundraising gap with Beasley.

In what was reported as an upset victory, Hodges won the gubernatorial race by 85,982 votes, and won 35 of 46 counties. Hodges became the first challenger to defeat a sitting governor since the South Carolina constitution first allowed consecutive terms in 1980.

=== Tenure as governor ===
As South Carolina's 114th governor, Hodges signed a law that made Martin Luther King Jr. Day an official state holiday; South Carolina was the last state in the U.S. to do so. That law also added a Confederate Memorial Day, a move that drew opposition from the NAACP. Several hours later, Hodges signed the South Carolina Heritage Act which the General Assembly had passed as a compromise so that the Confederate flag could be moved from the state capitol's dome to its grounds.

Public education was a major focus in the Hodges administration, as Hodges oversaw the founding of the South Carolina Education Lottery and the First Steps preschool initiative. The governor also helped pass a $1.1 billion school construction initiative, and the lottery funded millions in college scholarships to South Carolina students.

Hodges made efforts to reform land use policy in South Carolina. He signed several executive orders which created task forces and interagency councils. Besides the Historic Preservation Task Force created by Hodges, Governor Mark Sanford did not continue Hodges policies. Hodges also instituted the construction of the Ravenel Bridge in Charleston, which is North America's longest cabled spanned bridge.

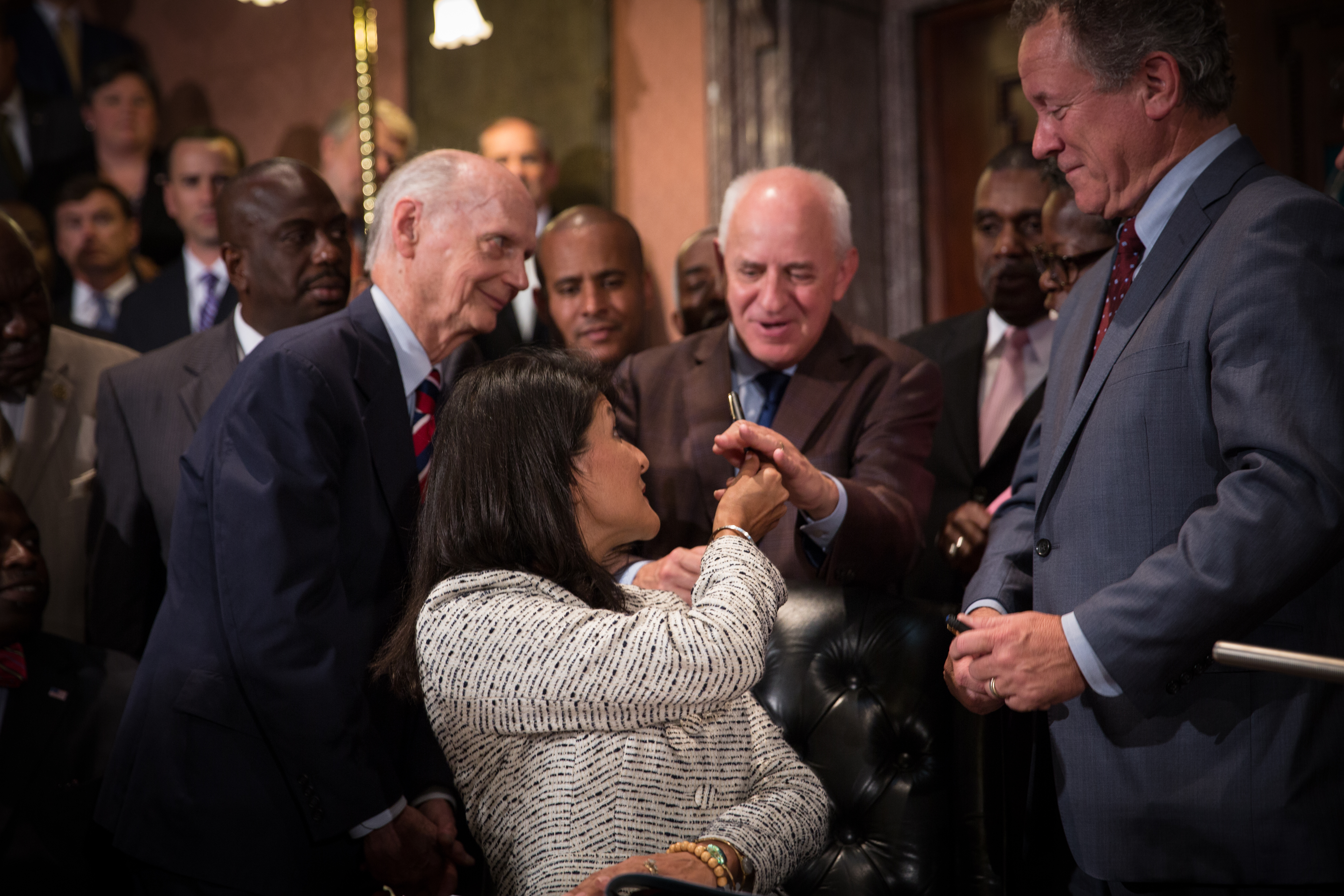
Nikki Haley gives Jim Hodges pen after bill signing to remove the Confederate flag from the grounds of the South Carolina State House.

Hodges received criticism in his first year in office for his management of the Hurricane Floyd evacuation, particularly his decision not to make Interstate 26 one-way westbound. Hodges also received blame for financial problems with the state Department of Commerce and long lines at Division of Motor Vehicles offices.

In 2003, the University of South Carolina self-reported to the NCAA several secondary recruiting violations on Hodges' part. Hodges had met with recruits, something he was prohibited from doing as an ex-oficio trustee of the university.

=== 2002 gubernatorial election ===
In 2002 Hodges ran for reelection against former U.S. Representative Mark Sanford. Like Hodges' 1998 bid, the race concentrated on issues such as education and the state budget.

During the campaign, Sanford "likened Hodges to a weasel and to former President Bill Clinton and Al Gore," reported The State in October 2002. On November 5, 2002, Sanford defeated Hodges by 64,282 votes. To date, Hodges remains the last Democrat to have served as governor of South Carolina.

== Post-political career ==
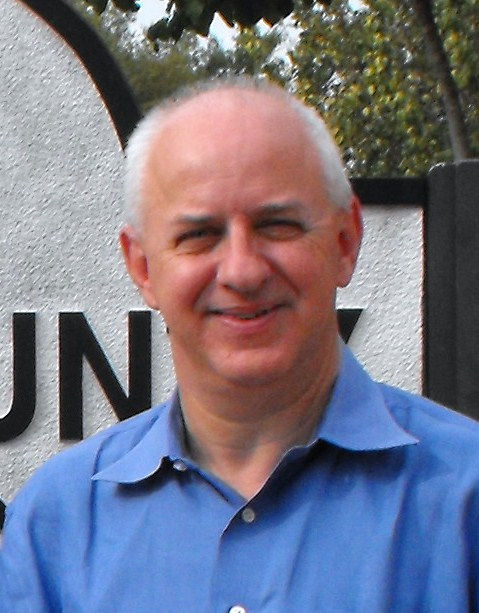
Hodges in 2008

Since leaving office as governor, Hodges has served as a senior advisor at McGuire Woods Consulting, LLC, and as partner in the affiliated law firm of McGuireWoods, LLP, and is based in Columbia, South Carolina.

He endorsed General Wesley Clark's (D-Arkansas) campaign in the 2004 Democratic presidential primaries.

In 2007, Hodges publicly supported Stephen Colbert's attempt to run for president in the South Carolina primaries, and even offered himself up as a vice presidential choice should the comedian actually win the nomination. In February 2008 the former governor officially endorsed U.S. Senator Barack Obama (D-Illinois) in the 2008 Democratic presidential primaries. The Obama campaign, in turn, named Hodges as one of its national co-chairs.

Hodges and his wife Rachel live in Columbia with their two sons. He is an Episcopalian.

Party political offices
Preceded by Nick Theodore	Democratic nominee for Governor of South Carolina; 1998, 2002	Succeeded by Tommy Moore
Political offices
Preceded by David Beasley	Governor of South Carolina; 1999–2003	Succeeded by Mark Sanford
U.S. order of precedence (ceremonial)
Preceded by David Beasley as Former Governor	Order of precedence of the United States	Succeeded by Mark Sanford as Former Governor
