= David Beasley =

American politician (born 1957)

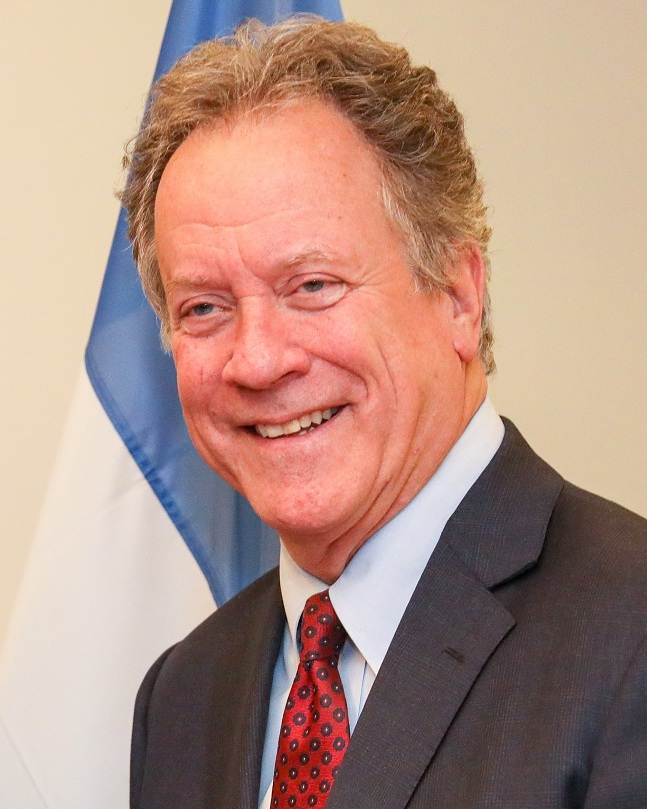
- Beasley in 2020

13th Executive Director of the World Food Programme
- In office April 4, 2017 – April 5, 2023
- Secretary General: António Guterres
- Preceded by: Ertharin Cousin
- Succeeded by: Cindy McCain

113th Governor of South Carolina
- In office January 11, 1995 – January 13, 1999
- Lieutenant: Bob Peeler
- Preceded by: Carroll Campbell
- Succeeded by: Jim Hodges

Member of the South Carolina House of Representatives from the 56th district
- In office 1979–1992
- Preceded by: Gary Byrd
- Succeeded by: Denny Neilson

Personal details
- Born: David Muldrow Beasley; February 26, 1957 (age 69) Lamar, South Carolina, U.S.
- Party: Democratic (before 1991); Republican (1991–2026); Independent (2026–present)
- Spouse: Mary Wood Payne
- Education: Clemson University (attended); University of South Carolina (BA, JD)

David Muldrow Beasley (born February 26, 1957) is an American politician, law professor, and the former executive director of the United Nations World Food Programme. A former member of the Republican Party, he served one term as the 113th governor of South Carolina from 1995 until 1999 before losing reelection to Democrat Jim Hodges. He also served as a state representative from 1981 until 1995.

== Early life ==
Beasley was born in Lamar, South Carolina. He is the son of Richard Lee Beasley and Jacqueline (Blackwell) Beasley. He graduated from Lamar High School in 1975, then attended the Capitol Page School in Washington, DC while serving as a page in the U.S. Congress.

== Early political career ==
Elected to the South Carolina House of Representatives at age 20 as a Democrat, Beasley transferred from Clemson University to the University of South Carolina where he received a BA in Interdisciplinary Studies in 1979 and a J.D. from the School of Law in 1983. Beasley was a member of the South Carolina House representing the Society Hill area from 1979 until 1992, serving as majority whip from 1985 to 1986 and the majority leader from 1987 to 1989.He served as the youngest Speaker pro tempore and majority leader in the nation.

During the 1991–92 legislative session Beasley switched to the Republican Party.

== Governor of South Carolina (1995–1999) ==
In the 1994 gubernatorial election, both Beasley and his Democratic opponent Lieutenant Governor Nick Theodore faced tough primary opposition within their respective parties. Beasley defeated his toughest competitor, former congressman and state senator Arthur Ravenel Jr., in both the primary and run-off, and went on to win the general election by a narrow margin of 50% to 48%.

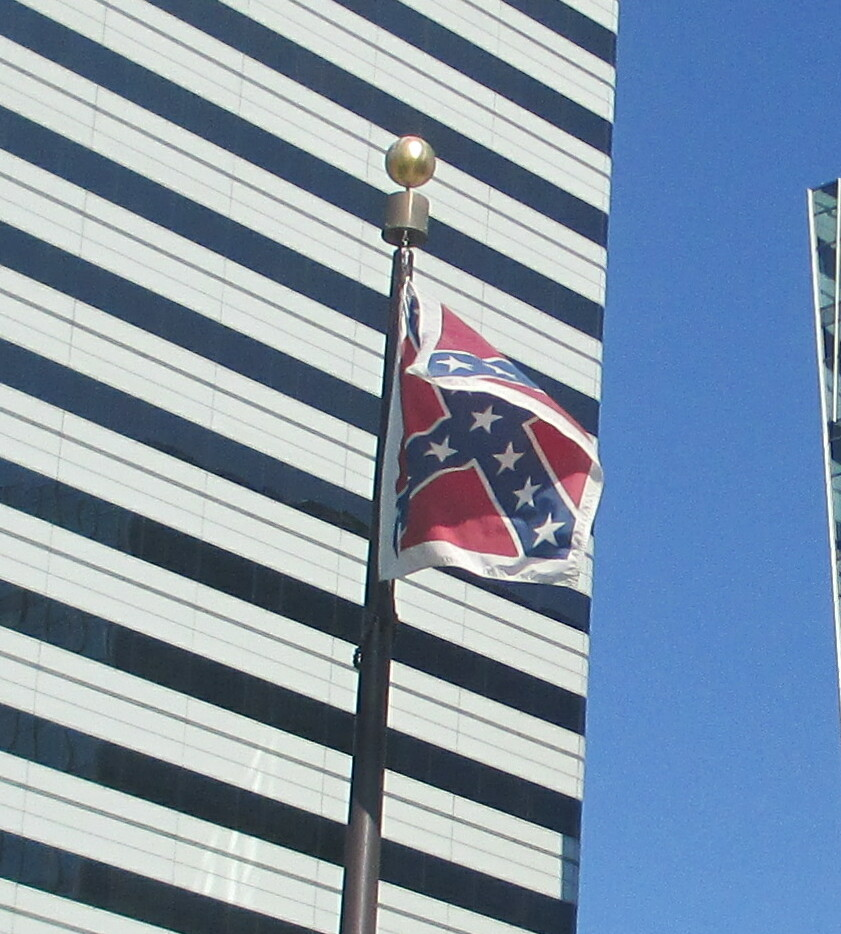
Beasley supported moving the Confederate flag from the Statehouse dome to a pole on the lawn (as seen in the image).

South Carolina had a strong economy while Beasley was governor, with unemployment at a record-low 3.5% in 1998. Beasley often made known his Christ-centered beliefs and conservatism in a state known for its strong ties to Christianity and conservative politics.

Beasley strongly opposed gambling, which was legal in South Carolina until 2002. At the time, many gas stations, convenience stores, and poker "casinos" were established across the state, and as Beasley supported legislation that would outlaw gambling, the video poker industry generated "Ban Beasley" billboards and radio ads.

Until 2000, the Confederate flag flew atop the South Carolina State House. It had been raised over the Capitol dome in celebration of the Civil War centennial. This celebration started in 1961 with the raising of the Army of Tennessee Battle Flag over the State House Dome. The Army of Tennessee Battle Flags were also displayed in the inner chambers of the SC Senate and SC House of Representatives.

Beasley initially supported the flag's presence but announced on statewide television in 1996 that he had reversed his decision and believed the flag should be relocated to a monument elsewhere on the grounds. He lost bid for re-election in the 1998 gubernatorial election. The flag was removed from the capitol dome in 2000 after Beasley left office. It was displayed on a pole in front of the statehouse until it was removed from the grounds in 2015 after the Emanuel Nine shooting.

Beasley also faced allegations of having an affair with his former press secretary, Ginny Wolfe. Beasley refuted the claims, saying, "[My wife and I] both have been faithful to one another 100 percent."

In the 1998 South Carolina gubernatorial election, Beasley lost re-election to Democratic former state representative Jim Hodges by a large margin of 53% to 45%. Hodges took advantage of controversy and missteps made by Beasley, namely Beasley's indecisiveness on allowing the Confederate flag to fly at the state capitol and call to eliminate video poker while also blaming Beasley for the poor SAT scores and the low achievement levels by the students of the state. Donations from video gambling interests helped Hodges narrow a near million-dollar fundraising gap with Beasley.

== Later career ==
=== Post-governor ===
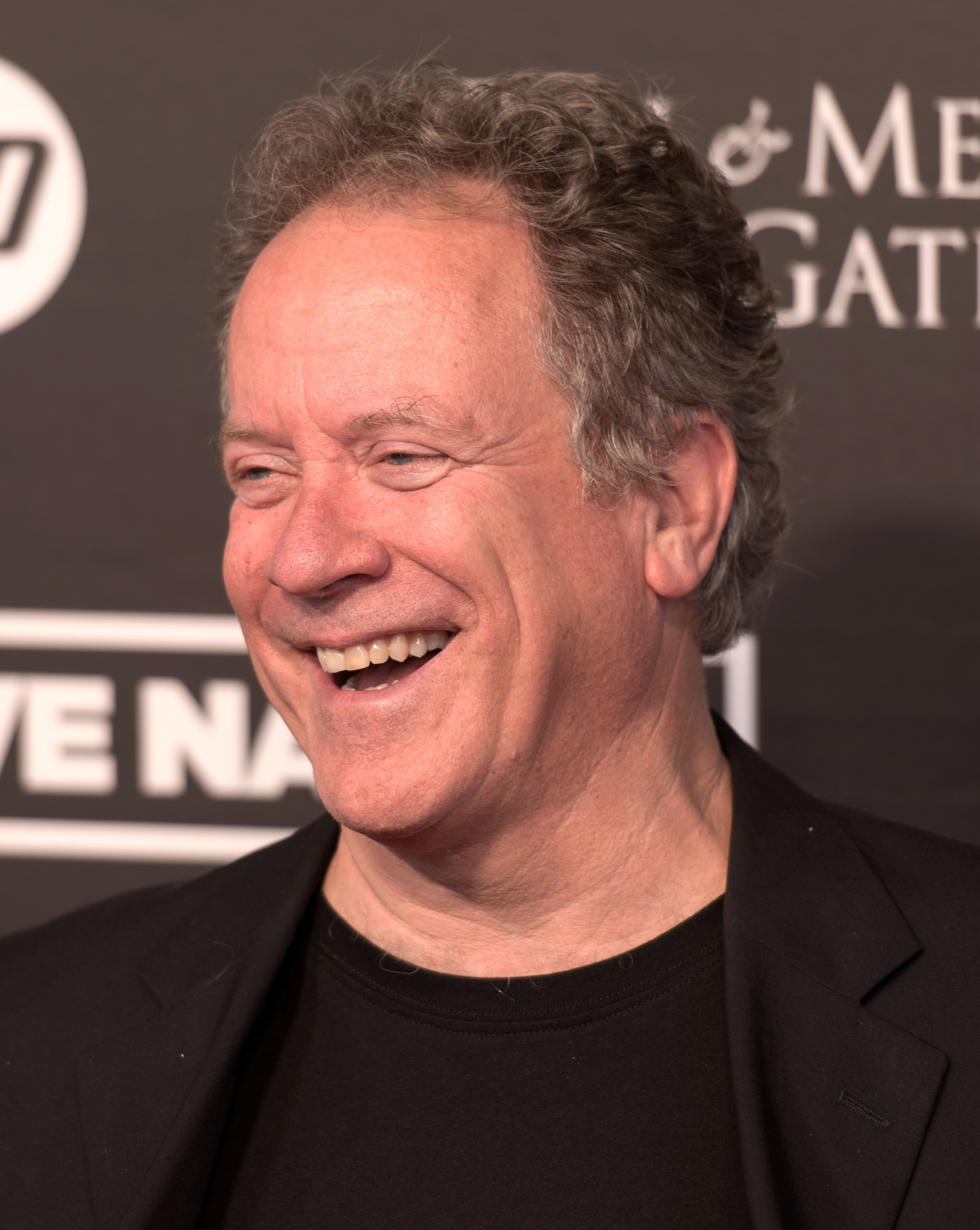
Beasley at the Global Citizen Festival in Hamburg, Germany.

In 2000, after leaving office as governor, Beasley supported George W. Bush in the South Carolina Republican presidential primary. He introduced Bush during a campaign speech at Bob Jones University, which drew controversy because of the fundamentalist school's anti-Catholic teaching and strict policy against interracial dating. Referring to Bush's anti-abortion stance, Beasley said Bush "shares our values."

After his term as governor, Beasley was a fellow at Harvard Kennedy School. In 2003, he received the John F. Kennedy Profile in Courage Award from U.S. senator Ted Kennedy for his controversial request to the South Carolina legislature to remove the Confederate flag from the South Carolina statehouse dome.

In 2004, Beasley unsuccessfully ran for the United States Senate to replace retiring Democrat Fritz Hollings. He lost the Republican nomination to Congressman Jim DeMint of Greenville, South Carolina. In April 2005, Beasley, along with his administration's former chief legal counsel, Henry Deneen, incorporated the Center for Global Strategies, Ltd (CGS). CGS focuses on developmental initiatives in the non-integrated world. Beasley is chairman of the board.

In 2007, Beasley endorsed Mike Huckabee in the 2008 Republican presidential primaries. In 2010, he endorsed Henry McMaster in the South Carolina Republican gubernatorial primaries.

In January 2024, Beasley was made a Distinguished Professor of Practice and Public Service in the Department of Legal Studies at the University of South Carolina's Joseph F. Rice School of Law.

=== World Food Programme ===
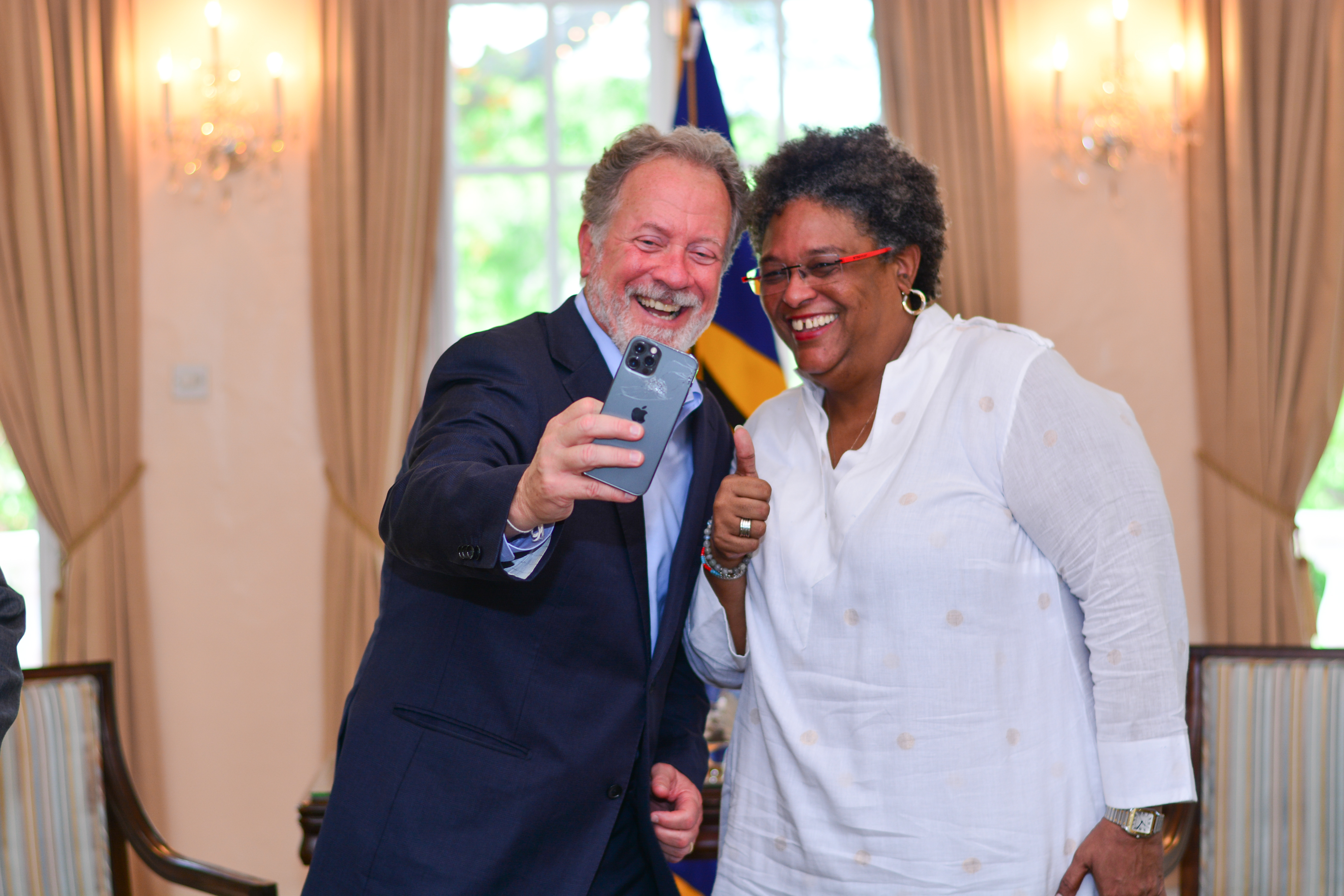
Beasley with Barbados prime minister Mia Mottley.

In February 2017, United States Ambassador to the United Nations Nikki Haley (also a former South Carolina governor) nominated Beasley to be the next executive director of the World Food Programme (WFP). (Note: President Donald Trump approved the nomination) United Nations Secretary-General António Guterres and U.N. Food and Agriculture Organization José Graziano da Silva officially appointed Beasley to the post in March 2017, saying he brought "extensive experience with key governmental and business leaders and stakeholders around the world, with very strong resource mobilisation skills." Guterres also said Beasley had been among 23 applications/nominations for the position.

In his capacity as executive director of WFP, Beasley served at the level of Under-Secretary-General of the United Nations and was a member of the organization's Senior Management Group (SMG) under Guterres. Since 2019, he has been a member of the World Economic Forum High-Level Group on Humanitarian Investing, co-chaired by Børge Brende, Kristalina Georgieva and Peter Maurer.

In December 2020, Beasley accepted the Nobel Peace Prize on behalf of the WFP for its efforts to combat world hunger.

As the term of the director of the World Food Programme is five years, Beasley's term was originally set to expire in April 2022. However, United Nations Secretary-General António Guterres extended Beasley's term, citing the current food crisis of the Russo-Ukrainian War and the COVID-19 pandemic. President Biden initially opposed extending Beasley's term, but bipartisan support in Congress encouraged Biden to support the extension. Beasley's term as executive director expired in April 2023.

In 2023, he was made a Grand officer of the Order of the Two Niles by the Sudanese head of state General Abdel Fattah al-Burhan.

In October 2026, he publicly broke with the Republican Party under Donald Trump, saying he had left to become an independent. A few days later, he issued a joint endorsement of Democrat Annie Andrews with his former rival and successor Jim Hodges in the 2026 US Senate election in South Carolina. Andrews would later win the race.

== Other activities ==
- SDG2 Advocacy Hub, co-chair of the steering committee (since 2017)
- Scaling Up Nutrition (SUN), member of the Lead Group (since 2017)
- Peace Research Endowment (PRE), member of the board of directors (since 2011)

== Awards and recognitions ==
- 2003 – John F. Kennedy Profile in Courage Award
- 2020 – Nobel Peace Prize awarded to the World Food Programme
- 2025 - Global Vision Award, Columbia World Affairs Council

== Personal life ==
Beasley is married to Mary Wood Beasley.

== Notes ==
Party political offices
Preceded by Carroll Campbell	Republican nominee for Governor of South Carolina; 1994, 1998	Succeeded by Mark Sanford
Preceded by Terry Branstad	Chair of the Republican Governors Association; 1997–1998	Succeeded by Frank Keating
Political offices
Preceded by Carroll Campbell	Governor of South Carolina; 1995–1999	Succeeded by Jim Hodges
Diplomatic posts
Preceded by Ertharin Cousin	Executive Director of the World Food Programme; 2017–2023	Succeeded by Cindy McCain
U.S. order of precedence (ceremonial)
Preceded by Martha McSally as Former U.S. Senator	Order of precedence of the United States; Within South Carolina	Succeeded by Jim Hodges as Former Governor
Preceded by Larry Hogan as Former Governor	Order of precedence of the United States; Outside South Carolina	Succeeded by Jim Hodges as Former Governor
