= Renaissance Weekend =

Retreat for innovative leaders

Renaissance Weekends are invitation-only, non-partisan gatherings organized several times each year with the objective of bridging professional, political, religious and generational divides. Each Weekend’s activities include informal, off-the-record lectures, seminars, discussions and performances.

== History and Mission ==
Organized by the non-profit Renaissance Institute to encourage civil discourse about significant issues, Renaissance Weekends were founded in 1981 and continue to be hosted by Linda and Philip Lader, the former US Ambassador to the Court of St. James’s and Chairman of WPP plc. Invitee families are nominated by past participants with the criteria of professional distinction and/or innovation, subject-matter authority, potential contribution to the program, and likely commitment to the gatherings’ non-commercial spirit and tradition of civility.

== Format and Activities ==
Participants design their own programs 7 from hundreds of simultaneous sessions addressing a wide range of current issues and diverse subjects. To encourage diverse viewpoints and candid exchange or perspectives, the schedule, topics and specific participants are not disclosed publicly; and all discussion is off-the-record. All participants contribute to each Weekend’s content.

== Locations and Funding ==
Several Renaissance Weekends are organized each year in different US locations; and more than 185 have been held. The New Year’s gathering, traditionally the largest, was held on Hilton Head Island for the first 20 years, but subsequently takes place in Charleston, South Carolina. No corporate sponsorships are sought, and attendees cover the cost of participation.
