= Eldridge Emory =

American politician

Member of the South Carolina House of Representatives from the 45th district
- In office November 9, 1998 – November 13, 2006
- Preceded by: Jim Hodges
- Succeeded by: Mick Mulvaney

Personal details
- Born: March 19, 1935 Lancaster, South Carolina
- Died: February 20, 2023 (aged 87) Lancaster, South Carolina
- Party: Democratic

Eldridge Emory (March 19, 1935 – February 20, 2023) was an American politician who served in the South Carolina House of Representatives from the 45th district from 1998 to 2006.

He died on February 20, 2023, in Lancaster, South Carolina, at age 87.
