= Nick Theodore =

American politician (born 1928)

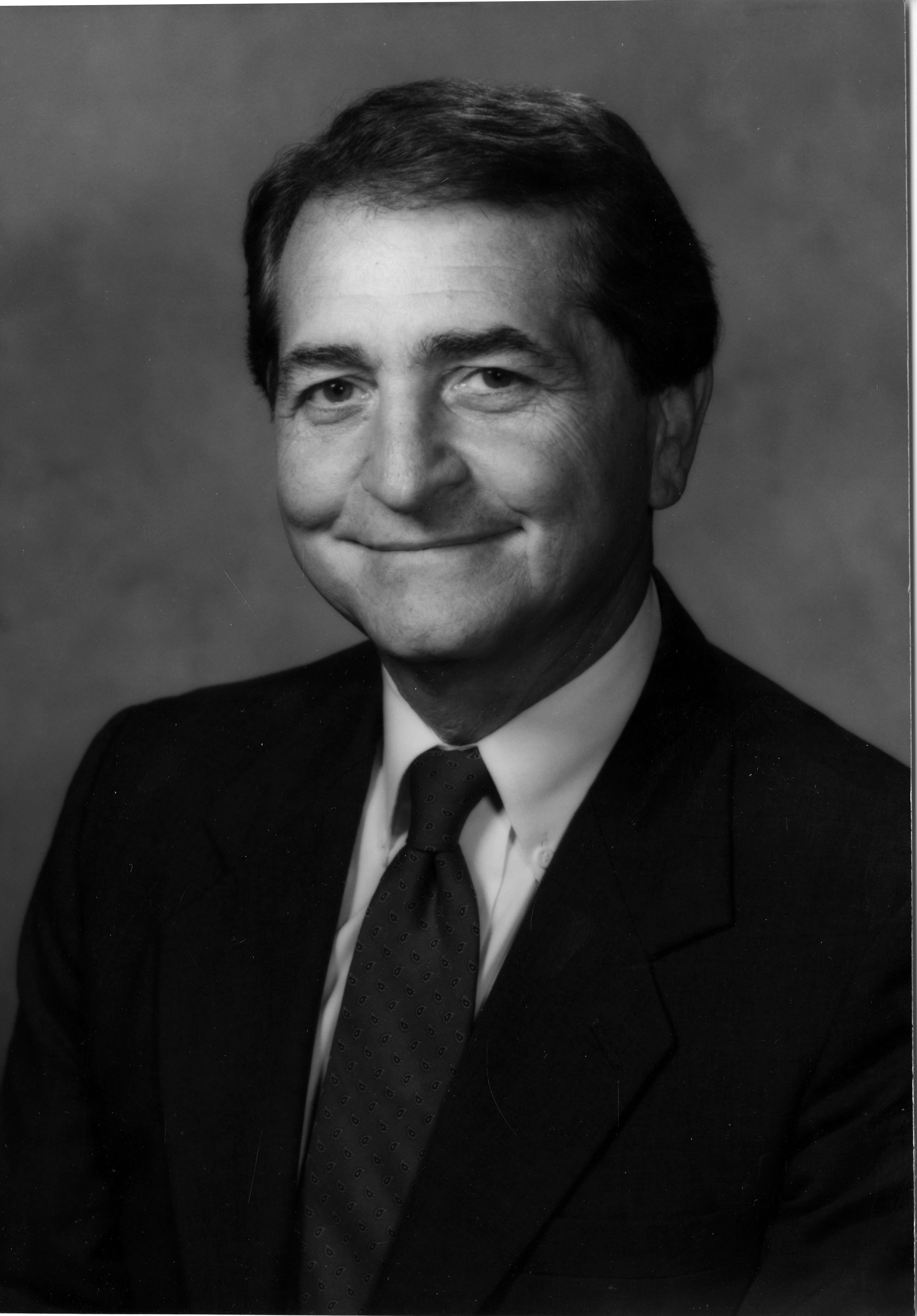

85th Lieutenant Governor of South Carolina
- In office January 14, 1987 – January 11, 1995
- Governor: Carroll Campbell
- Preceded by: Michael Daniel
- Succeeded by: Bob Peeler

Member of the South Carolina Senate from the 6th district
- In office January 8, 1985 – January 14, 1987
- Preceded by: Proportional representation
- Succeeded by: Sam Stilwell

Member of the South Carolina Senate from the 2nd district
- In office January 13, 1981 – January 8, 1985
- Preceded by: Charles Garrett
- Succeeded by: Nell Smith

Member of the South Carolina Senate from the 3rd district
- In office January 10, 1967 – January 14, 1969
- Preceded by: Constituency established
- Succeeded by: Charles Garrett

Member of the South Carolina House of Representatives from the 21st district
- In office January 14, 1975 – January 11, 1977
- Preceded by: Constituency established
- Succeeded by: Philip Bradley

Personal details
- Born: September 16, 1928 (age 97) Greenville, South Carolina, U.S.
- Party: Democratic
- Spouse: Emilie Demosthenes
- Children: 3
- Education: University of Georgia; Furman University (BS)

Nick Andrew Theodore (born September 16, 1928) is a former American politician from South Carolina. He was the first Greek-American elected to the South Carolina State Legislature. He served as a state representative from 1963 to 1966 and 1970 to 1978, a South Carolina state senator from 1967 to 1968 and from 1981 to 1986, and the 85th lieutenant governor of South Carolina from 1987 to 1995. He is a member of the Democratic Party, and is the most recent Democrat elected as South Carolina’s Lieutenant Governor.

== Biography ==
Theodore was born in Greenville, South Carolina, to Andrew and Lula Theodore, Greek immigrants, the youngest of five children. Growing up he was involved with the St. George Greek Orthodox Cathedral community in Greenville, and the Sons of Pericles, a junior auxiliary of the American Hellenic Educational Progressive Association (AHEPA). Theodore attended the University of Georgia and graduated in 1952 from Furman University with a Bachelors in Business. He spent a total of 24 years serving in the South Carolina state legislature before being elected in 1986 to the office of lieutenant governor having beaten Republican Congressman Thomas F. Hartnett to the position. He served two full terms in that post under Republican Governor Carroll Campbell.

Ironically, it was fellow Greenville resident Campbell who, in 1978, had defeated Theodore in an election to the United States House of Representatives from South Carolina's 4th congressional district, one of famed political strategist Lee Atwater's first major triumphs. Despite this history, and the differences in their political philosophies and party affiliations, Campbell and Theodore worked together quite effectively during their two terms in office, and remained friendly with each other.

On April 13, 1993, Theodore witnessed the car accident that killed Nancy Thurmond, the daughter of longtime South Carolina Senator Strom Thurmond, from less than twenty feet away. Theodore had attended Nancy's 22nd birthday party only two weeks earlier.

At the conclusion of Campbell's two terms in office, Theodore ran for governor in 1994, defeating Charleston mayor Joseph P. Riley Jr. to secure the Democratic nomination. Theodore lost to Campbell's protégé David Beasley, however, in the general election. Four years later in 1998 he tried to regain his former post as lieutenant governor but lost in the general election to incumbent Bob Peeler (R).

In 2002, Theodore came out of a quasi-retirement to accept an interim appointment to the South Carolina Public Service Commission, ending in 2004. In 2006, his son, Drew Theodore, became the Democratic nominee for the statewide office of Comptroller General.

== Bibliography ==
- Trials and Triumphs: South Carolina's Evolution, 1962-2014: Political Memoirs and Personal Memories of Nick Theodore (Faith Printing Company, Taylors, SC: 2014).

Party political offices
Preceded by Michael Daniel	Democratic nominee for Lieutenant Governor of South Carolina; 1986, 1990	Succeeded by Liz Patterson
Preceded by Theo Mitchell	Democratic nominee for Governor of South Carolina; 1994	Succeeded by Jim Hodges
Preceded by Liz Patterson	Democratic nominee for Lieutenant Governor of South Carolina; 1998	Succeeded by Phil Leventis
Political offices
Preceded by Michael Daniel	Lieutenant Governor of South Carolina; 1987–1995	Succeeded by Bob Peeler
