= W. Brantley Harvey Jr. =

American politician

82nd Lieutenant Governor of South Carolina
- In office January 21, 1975 – January 10, 1979
- Governor: James B. Edwards
- Preceded by: Earle Morris Jr.
- Succeeded by: Nancy Stevenson

Member of the South Carolina House of Representatives from Beaufort County
- In office 1958–1975
- Preceded by: J. Wilton Graves

Personal details
- Born: William Brantley Harvey Jr. August 14, 1930 Walterboro, South Carolina, U.S.
- Died: December 12, 2018 (aged 88) Beaufort, South Carolina, U.S.
- Party: Democratic
- Spouse: Helen
- Relations: W. Brantley Harvey Sr. (father)
- Children: 5
- Education: The Citadel; University of South Carolina
- Occupation: lawyer

William Brantley Harvey Jr. (August 14, 1930 – December 12, 2018) was an American lawyer and politician in the state of South Carolina.

He was the son of W. Brantley Harvey Sr. (1893–1981), a lawyer in Beaufort, South Carolina, and former member of the South Carolina House of Representatives and the South Carolina State Senate. Harvey attended The Citadel, The Military College of South Carolina, and afterward served in the United States Army. He received a law degree from the University of South Carolina, and was admitted to the bar in 1955. He then joined his father's law firm, Harvey & Battey. He was elected to the South Carolina House of Representatives as a Democrat in 1958, and served until 1975, when he was installed as 82nd lieutenant governor of South Carolina. He served in that position until 1979. Harvey later served on the South Carolina Commission of Parks, Recreation and Tourism, as well as the South Carolina Department of Transportation.

Harvey died on December 12, 2018, at the age of 88. He was married to Helen and has two sons and three daughters. Governor Henry McMaster announced that flags would be lowered in the late Lieutenant Governor's honor. On December 14, 2018, Executive Order 2018-63 was filed for that purpose.

Party political offices
Preceded by Earle Morris Jr.	Democratic nominee for Lieutenant Governor of South Carolina; 1974	Succeeded by Nancy Stevenson
Political offices
Preceded by Earle Morris Jr.	Lieutenant Governor of South Carolina; 1975–1979	Succeeded by Nancy Stevenson
