= Richard Riley =

American politician (born 1933)

Dick Riley
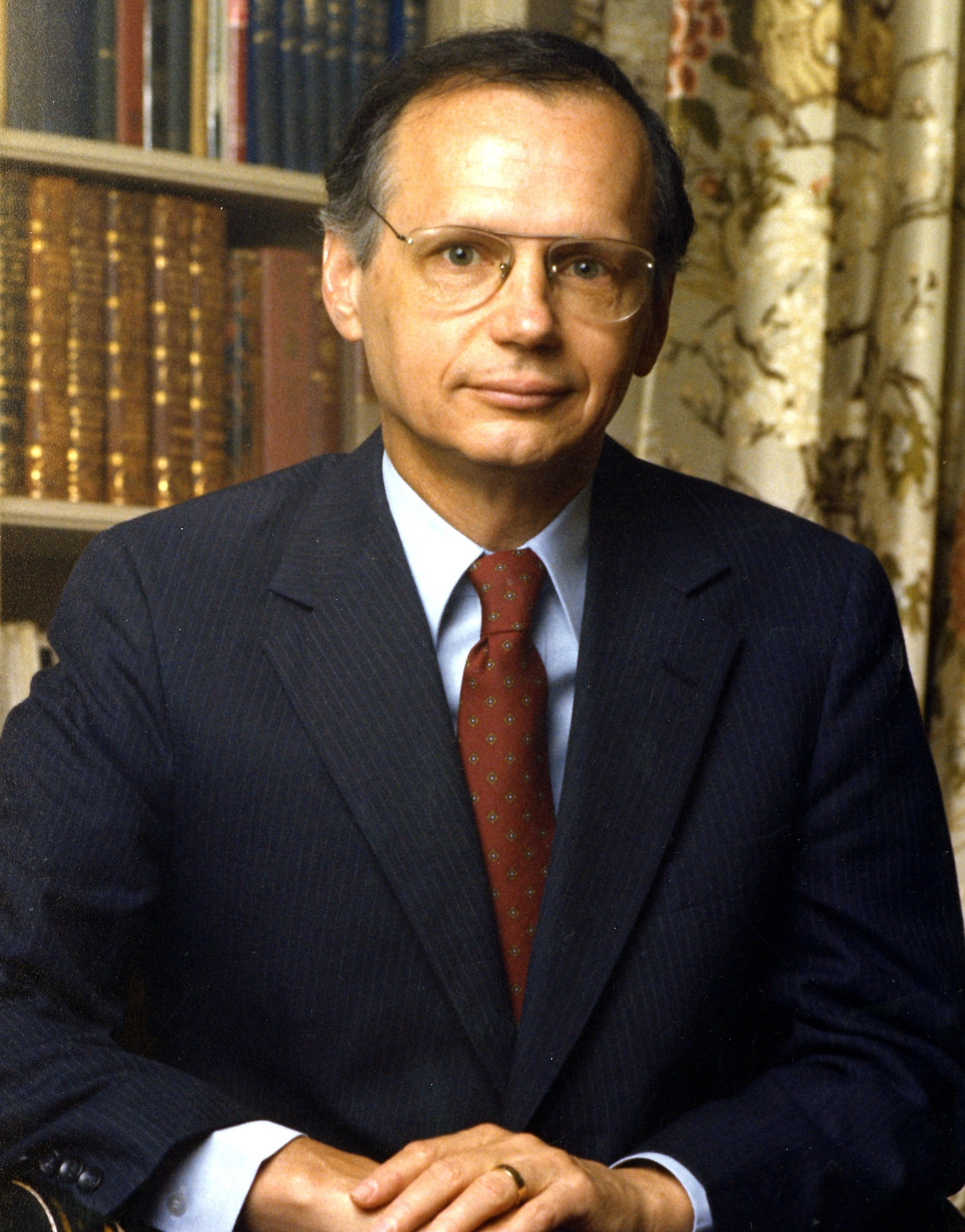
- Official portrait, c. 1979

6th United States Secretary of Education
- In office January 21, 1993 – January 20, 2001
- President: Bill Clinton
- Preceded by: Lamar Alexander
- Succeeded by: Rod Paige

111th Governor of South Carolina
- In office January 10, 1979 – January 14, 1987
- Lieutenant: Nancy Stevenson; Michael R. Daniel
- Preceded by: James B. Edwards
- Succeeded by: Carroll A. Campbell Jr.

Member of the South Carolina Senate
- In office January 10, 1967 – January 11, 1977
- Preceded by: Constituency established
- Succeeded by: Carroll A. Campbell Jr.
- Constituency: 3rd district (1967–1973); 2nd district (1973–1977)

Personal details
- Born: Richard Wilson Riley; January 2, 1933 (age 93) Greenville, South Carolina, U.S.
- Party: Democratic
- Spouse: Ann Yarborough
- Children: 4
- Education: Furman University (BA); University of South Carolina (JD)

Military service
- Allegiance: United States
- Branch/service: United States Navy
- Years of service: 1954–1955

Richard Wilson Riley (born January 2, 1933) is an American politician who served as the sixth United States secretary of education from 1993 to 2001 under President Bill Clinton and as the 111th governor of South Carolina from 1979 to 1987. He is a member of the Democratic Party. Riley is the only Democrat to serve two consecutive terms as governor in the time since the state constitution was amended to allow governors to serve consecutive terms.

== Early life and career ==
Richard Riley was born on January 2, 1933, in Greenville, South Carolina, to Edward P. "Ted" Riley and the former Martha (née Dixon) Riley. He graduated cum laude from Furman University, where he was a member of the South Carolina Phi chapter of Sigma Alpha Epsilon, in 1954 and received his Juris Doctor degree from the University of South Carolina School of Law.

Riley served in the South Carolina House of Representatives from 1963 to 1967. He served in the South Carolina Senate from 1967 to 1977.

== Governor of South Carolina (1979–1987) ==
Riley was elected governor of South Carolina in 1978. During his first term, the state constitution was amended to allow governors to serve two terms. Riley was re-elected in 1982, 70%-30%, over the Republican former journalist W. D. Workman, Jr., of Greenville, and served until 1987.

As governor, Riley presided over the resumption of executions, despite his personal opposition to the death penalty.

Riley spearheaded the South Carolina Education Improvement Act of 1984, a consequential statewide education reform effort that led him to being dubbed as South Carolina’s “Education Governor.” He also initiated landmark legislation such as the Medically Indigent Assistance Act, the first statewide program of its kind in the nation; the Employment Revitalization Act aimed at coordinating occupational training statewide; and the Omnibus Crime Bill.

== Post-gubernatorial career ==
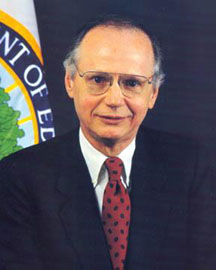
Riley as secretary of education

In 1993, President Bill Clinton approached Riley about an appointment to the United States Supreme Court, which Riley turned down. Clinton ultimately appointed Ruth Bader Ginsburg. That same year, President Clinton appointed Riley to his Cabinet as Secretary of Education. From 1997 to 2000, Riley worked with senior adviser Carol Rasco, the director of Clinton's childhood literacy initiative, the America Reads Challenge, to design and implement the program. Riley served as Secretary of Education until Clinton left office in 2001. Since then, he has served as a partner in the law firm of Nelson Mullins Riley & Scarborough, LLP, and served as a board member of the Albert Shanker Institute. On June 27, 2007, he endorsed Hillary Clinton for president and served as a campaign co-chair.

=== World Justice Project ===
Riley is one of the World Justice Project's honorary chairs. The World Justice Project works to lead a global, multidisciplinary effort to strengthen the Rule of Law for the development of communities of opportunity and equity.

== Recognition ==
In 1999, Furman University, Riley's alma mater, created the Richard W. Riley Institute of Government, Politics and Public Leadership in his honor. In 2000, Riley received the Foreign Language Advocacy Award from the Northeast Conference on the Teaching of Foreign Languages in recognition of his support for education and especially for his repeated recommendations that all students learn a second language. In 2008, Walden University renamed its college of education the Richard W. Riley College of Education and Leadership, in honor of Riley's "commitment to students, his legacy of improving access to higher education, and his focus on diversity in education." Winthrop University also renamed its college of education after Riley in 2000.

TIME magazine in 2008 named him among the Top Ten Best Cabinet Members in USA history. The Christian Science Monitor once said that many Americans regard Dick Riley as "one of the great statesmen of education in this (20th) century." The late David Broder, columnist for The Washington Post, called him one of the "most decent and honorable people in public life."

In 2018, his hometown of Greenville announced plans to memorialize him with a sculpture representing his extraordinary public leadership and commitment to quality education for all children.

The Richard W. Riley Collection opened in 2018 at the University of South Carolina’s South Carolina Political Collections and contains more than 3,000 photographs; thousands of speeches with Riley’s handwritten edits; extensive research notes on policy development; considerable correspondence and news clippings; interviews with Riley and his late wife, Tunky, their son, Ted, and Dick Riley's father, Edward P. “Ted” Riley. The collection also includes printed campaign materials from Riley's political campaigns and his efforts for others, including Clinton, Jimmy Carter, and Al Gore.

== Personal life ==
Riley and his wife, the late Ann O. Yarborough, have three sons and one daughter.

== See also ==
- Bill Clinton Supreme Court candidates

South Carolina Senate
Preceded by Constituency established	Member of the South Carolina Senate from the 3rd district 1967–1973	Succeeded by John W. Drummond
Preceded by Harris Smith	Member of the South Carolina Senate from the 2nd district 1973–1977	Succeeded by Carroll A. Campbell Jr.
Party political offices
Preceded by Bryan Dorn	Democratic nominee for Governor of South Carolina; 1978, 1982	Succeeded by Michael Daniel
Preceded by Bruce Babbitt	Chair of the Democratic Governors Association; 1985–1986	Succeeded by Michael Dukakis
Political offices
Preceded by James Edwards	Governor of South Carolina; 1979–1987	Succeeded by Carroll A. Campbell Jr.
Preceded by Lamar Alexander	United States Secretary of Education; 1993–2001	Succeeded by Rod Paige
U.S. order of precedence (ceremonial)
Preceded by Federico Peña as Former U.S. Cabinet Member	Order of precedence of the United States as Former U.S. Cabinet Member	Succeeded by Bruce Babbitt as Former U.S. Cabinet Member
