= DeBordieu Colony, South Carolina =

Coordinates: 33°22′09″N 79°09′06″W

DeBordieu Colony
- Census-designated place
- Nickname: DeBordieu
- Interactive map of DeBordieu Colony
- Country: United States
- State: South Carolina
- County: Georgetown

Area
  - Total: 4.34 sq mi (11.24 km^{2})
  - Land: 4.12 sq mi (10.67 km^{2})
  - Water: 0.22 sq mi (0.57 km^{2})
- Elevation: 7 ft (2.1 m)

Population (2020)
  - Total: 858
  - Density: 208.3/sq mi (80.42/km^{2})
- Time zone: UTC-5 (EST)
  - Summer (DST): UTC-4 (EDT)
- ZIP code: 29440
- Area code: 843
- FIPS code: 45-18810
- GNIS feature ID: 2812955
- Website: www.debordieu.com

DeBordieu Colony, DeBordieu Beach or simply DeBordieu is a private, unincorporated community and census-designated place (CDP) in Georgetown County, South Carolina, United States. The name itself has roots in French, meaning "coastal border" or "edge of water". It consists of approximately 2,700 acres (11 km^{2}) of land, of which roughly 800 acres is inaccessible wildlife preserve. Parts of DeBordieu lie on Debidue Island. DeBordieu is located south of Pawleys Island and north of Georgetown east of U.S. Route 17. It is an oceanfront gated community with a private golf and country club.

It was first listed as a CDP in the 2020 census with a population of 858.

== Demographics ==
Historical population
Census	Pop.	Note	%±
2020	858		—
U.S. Decennial Census; 2020

DeBordieu Colony first appeared as a census designated place in the 2020 U.S. census.

=== 2020 census ===
DeBordieu Colony CDP, South Carolina – Demographic Profile (NH = Non-Hispanic)
Race / Ethnicity	Pop 2020	% 2020
White alone (NH)	829	96.62%
Black or African American alone (NH)	2	0.23%
Native American or Alaska Native alone (NH)	1	0.12%
Asian alone (NH)	1	0.12%
Pacific Islander alone (NH)	0	0.00%
Some Other Race alone (NH)	0	0.00%
Mixed Race/Multi-Racial (NH)	8	0.93%
Hispanic or Latino (any race)	17	1.98%
Total	858	100.00%

Note: the US Census treats Hispanic/Latino as an ethnic category. This table excludes Latinos from the racial categories and assigns them to a separate category. Hispanics/Latinos can be of any race.
