= 2002 South Carolina gubernatorial election =

- November 5, 2002
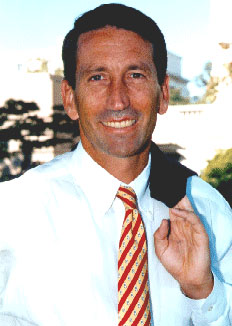

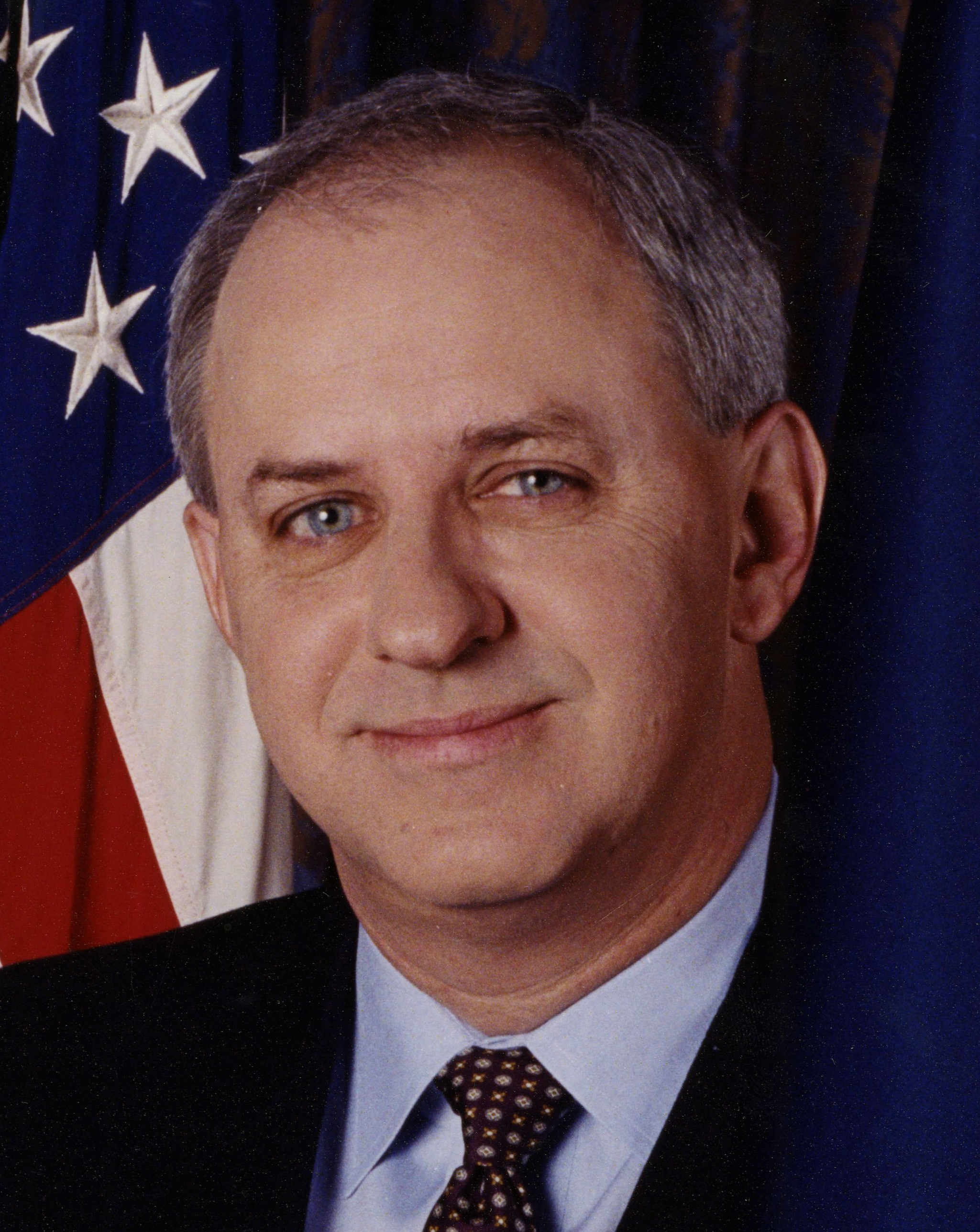
Nominee	Mark Sanford	Jim Hodges
Party	Republican	Democratic
Popular vote	585,422	521,140
Percentage	52.85%	47.05%
- County results Sanford: 50–60% 60–70% Hodges: 50–60% 60–70% 70–80%
Governor before election
Jim Hodges
Democratic
Elected Governor
Mark Sanford
Republican

The 2002 South Carolina gubernatorial election was held on November 5, 2002, to select the governor of the state of South Carolina. Mark Sanford, the Republican nominee, defeated incumbent Democratic governor Jim Hodges to become the 115th governor of South Carolina. Hodges became only the third incumbent governor and the first Democratic governor in South Carolina history to lose re-election. With Sanford's election, Republicans won a trifecta in the state for the first time since 1877.

== Democratic primary ==
Governor Jim Hodges faced no opposition from South Carolina Democrats and avoided a primary election.

== Republican primary ==
The South Carolina Republican Party held their primary on June 11, 2002, and the runoff on June 25, 2002. The contest became a race between Lieutenant Governor Bob Peeler from the Upstate and Mark Sanford, a former representative of the 1st congressional district in the Lowcountry. Sanford received the support of the candidates eliminated from the runoff election and easily defeated Peeler.

Republican primary results
Party	Candidate	Votes	%
Republican	Mark Sanford	122,143	38.62
Republican	Bob Peeler	119,026	37.64
Republican	Charlie Condon	49,469	15.64
Republican	Ken Wingate	12,366	3.91
Republican	Jim Miles	8,566	2.71
Republican	Reb Sutherland	2,770	0.88
Republican	Bill Branton	1,915	0.61
Total votes		316,255	100

Republican primary runoff results
Party	Candidate	Votes	%
Republican	Mark Sanford	183,820	60.13
Republican	Bob Peeler	121,881	39.87
Total votes		305,701	100

== General election ==
=== Predictions ===
Source	Ranking	As of
The Cook Political Report	Tossup	October 31, 2002
Sabato's Crystal Ball	Lean R (flip)	November 4, 2002

=== Polling ===
Poll source	Date(s) administered	Sample size (Note: Key: A – all adults RV – registered voters LV – likely voters V – unclear)	Margin of error	Jim Hodges (D)	Mark Sanford (R)	Other / Undecided
SurveyUSA	November 1–3, 2002	764 (LV)	± 3.6%	52%	46%	2%

=== Results ===
The general election was held on November 5, 2002, and Mark Sanford was elected as the next governor of South Carolina. Turnout was higher than in the previous gubernatorial election because of the competitive nature of the race between the two parties. Activist and author Kevin Alexander Gray was a gubernatorial candidate representing the South Carolina United Citizens’ Party & Green Party. He did not have the required signatures to be on the ballot, and consequently ran as a write-in candidate.

South Carolina gubernatorial election, 2002
Party	Candidate	Votes	%	±%
Republican	Mark Sanford	585,422	52.85%	+7.64
Democratic	Jim Hodges (incumbent)	521,140	47.05%	−6.18
Write-in		1,163	0.10%	-0.10
Majority		64,282	5.80%	
Turnout		1,107,725	54.1%	+1.10
Republican gain from Democratic				

Counties that flipped from Democratic to Republican

- Georgetown (largest city: Murrells Inlet)
- Barnwell (largest city: Barnwell)
- Berkeley (largest city: Goose Creek)
- Horry (largest town: Myrtle Beach)
- Dorchester (largest city: North Charleston)
- Edgefield (largest city: Edgefield)
- Florence (largest city: Florence)
- Greenwood (largest city: Greenwood)
- Kershaw (largest city: Cmaden)
- Laurens (largest city: Laurens)
- Newberry (largest city: Newberry)
- Saluda (largest city: Saluda)

== See also ==
- Governor of South Carolina
- List of governors of South Carolina
- South Carolina gubernatorial elections

== Notes ==
Preceded by 1998	South Carolina gubernatorial elections	Succeeded by 2006
