= 1998 South Carolina gubernatorial election =

- November 3, 1998
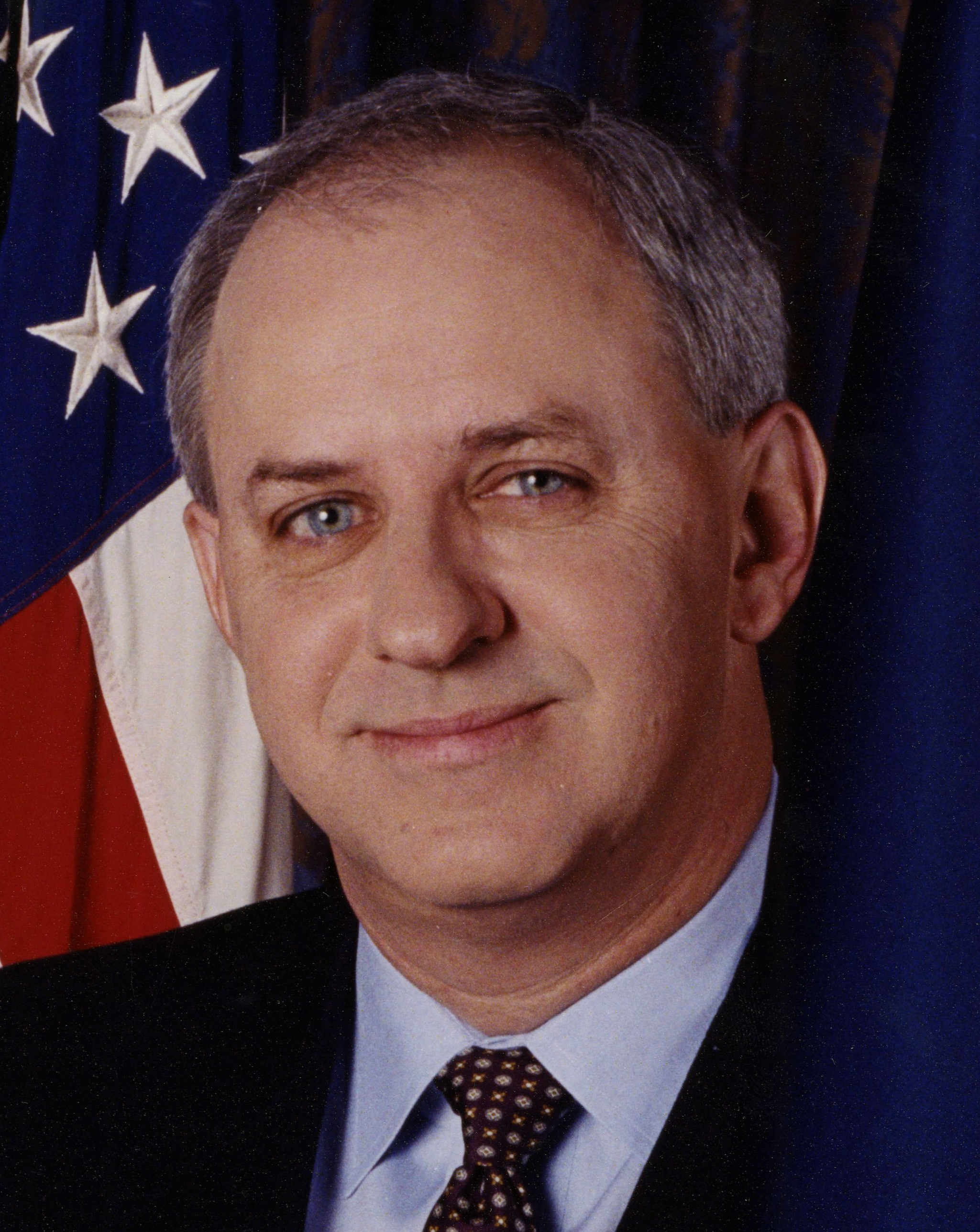

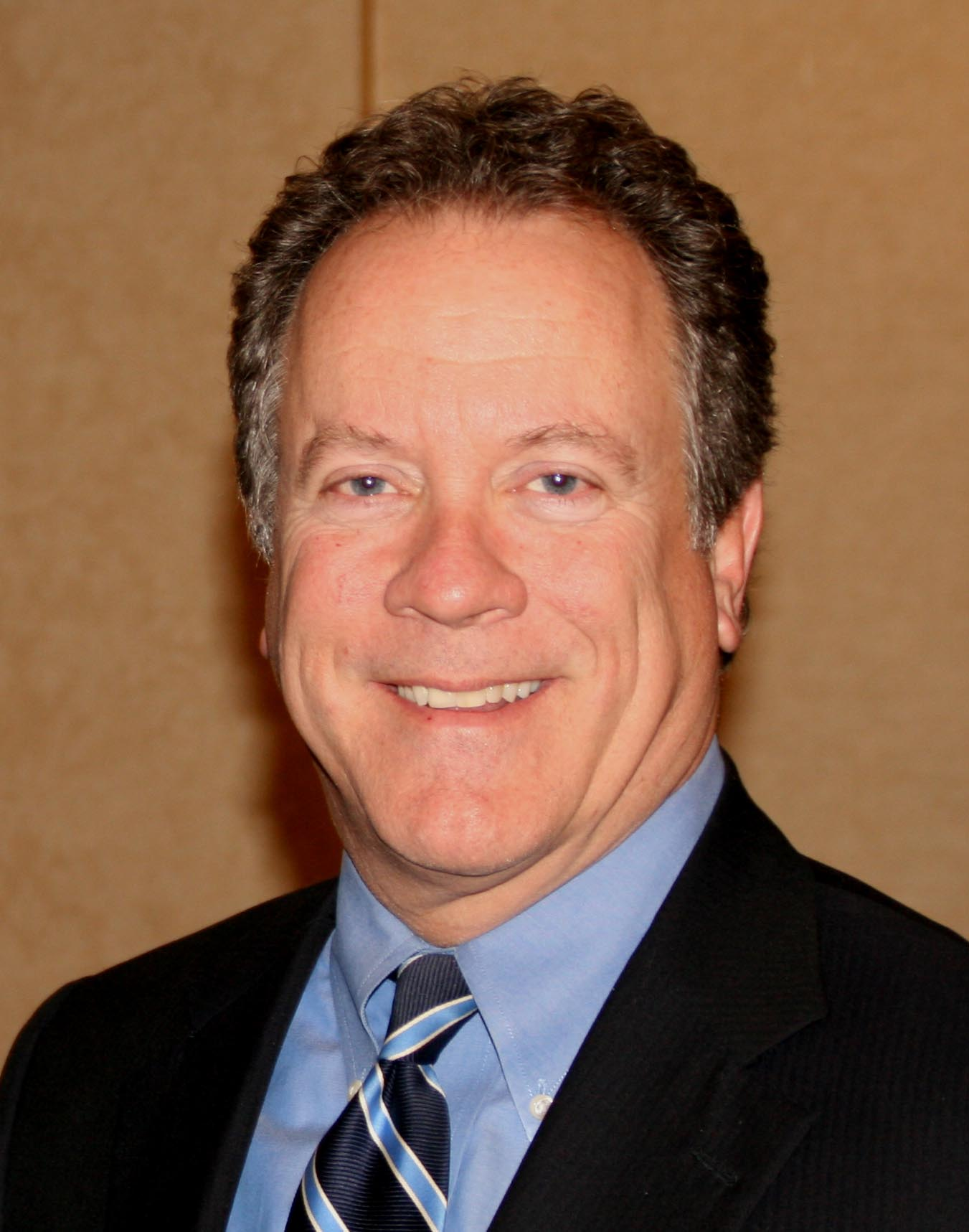
Nominee	Jim Hodges	David Beasley
Party	Democratic	Republican
Popular vote	570,070	484,088
Percentage	53.23%	45.21%
- County results Hodges: 50–60% 60–70% 70–80% Beasley: 40–50% 50–60%
Governor before election
David Beasley
Republican
Elected Governor
Jim Hodges
Democratic

The 1998 South Carolina gubernatorial election was held on November 3, 1998 to select the governor of South Carolina. Republican incumbent David Beasley ran for re-election to a second term in office but was defeated by Democratic state representative Jim Hodges.

Primary elections were held on June 9. Beasley faced a nominal challenge from Columbia attorney Bill Able, who won over a quarter of the vote. Hodges was unopposed for the Democratic nomination.

Beasley was the first incumbent governor to lose an election since Daniel Henry Chamberlain in the disputed election of 1876. As of 2026, this was the most recent time that a Democrat was elected governor of South Carolina and the only time since 1982. Beasley later ran for U.S. Senate in 2004 but lost the Republican primary.

== Republican primary ==
=== Candidates ===
- Bill Able, Columbia attorney
- David Beasley, incumbent governor of South Carolina since 1995

=== Results ===
1998 Republican gubernatorial primary
Party	Candidate	Votes	%
Republican	David Beasley (incumbent)	114,082	72.2%
Republican	Bill Able	43,967	27.8%

== General election ==
=== Candidates ===
- David Beasley, incumbent governor of South Carolina since 1995 (Republican)
- Jim Hodges, state representative from Lancaster (Democratic)
- Timothy Moultrie (Libertarian)

=== Campaign ===
Hodges started the campaign with a low name recognition, but he waged an aggressive campaign focused on education. Hodges blamed Beasley for the poor recent SAT scores and low academic achievement by South Carolina students, citing Beasley's opposition to all-day kindergarten. Hodges proposed a state lottery to fund public preschool and college scholarships. The lottery proved to be enormously popular with lower income South Carolinians who could not afford to send their children to preschool and soccer moms worried by the rapidly increasing cost of higher education.

Beasley responded by trying to shift the focus of the campaign to Hodges's ties to the gambling industry. As much as 70 percent of the money supplied to Hodges campaign was given by video poker operators.{{ In addition, the Palmetto League was being financed by video poker to attack Beasley's flip-flopping on the Confederate flag issue. Hodges keenly avoided discussing the Confederate flag issue to enable him to keep the support of blacks while also attracting disaffected whites.

To tie in South Carolinians' dissatisfaction with education of the state and the Confederate flag issue, Kevin Geddings of the Hodges campaign created a series of ads featuring a character called "Bubba." Portrayed by Kerry Maher, Bubba was a Georgia convenience store clerk dressed in Georgia Bulldogs garb who spoke with a thick Southern accent. The 30 second ads featured Bubba talking about how the Georgia lottery money was being used to improve schools there and the commercials would always end by Bubba saying, "Here in Georgia, we love David Beasley." Bubba was quickly elevated to celebrity status in South Carolina and was even adored by Gamecock fans when he made appearances at Williams-Brice Stadium for USC football games.

=== Polling ===
Poll source	Date(s) administered	Sample size (Note: Key: A – all adults RV – registered voters LV – likely voters V – unclear)	Margin of error	David Beasley (R)	Jim Hodges (D)	Other / undecided (Note: Calculated by taking the difference of 100% and all other candidates combined.)
Mason-Dixon Polling & Strategy	October 26–28, 1998	806 (LV)	± 3.5%	46%	44%	10%
Mason-Dixon Polling & Strategy	September 28–30, 1998	813 (LV)	± 3.5%	46%	37%	17%
Mason-Dixon Polling & Strategy	August 29 – September 1, 1998	806 (LV)	± 3.5%	51%	36%	13%
Mason-Dixon Polling & Strategy	June 1–3, 1998	811 (RV)	± 3.5%	55%	34%	11%

=== Results ===
Despite trailing in most polling, Jim Hodges was decisively elected. Unsurprisingly, Hodges performed extremely well in the rural counties, but it was the unexpectedly strong vote of the Lowcountry in his favor that enabled Hodges to defeat Beasley. Voter turnout decreased dramatically versus the previous election because approximately 500 thousand new voters were added to the rolls, but many of those chose not to vote in the election.

1998 South Carolina gubernatorial election
Party	Candidate	Votes	%	±%
Democratic	Jim Hodges	570,070	53.23%	▲5.3
Republican	David Beasley (incumbent)	484,088	45.21%	▼5.2
Libertarian	Timothy Moultrie	14,894	1.4%	N/A
Write-in		1,553	0.2%	Steady
Independent	Bobby Eubanks (write-in)	264	0.0%	N/A
Total votes		1,070,869	100.00%	
Democratic gain from Republican				

== See also ==
- Governor of South Carolina
- List of governors of South Carolina
- South Carolina gubernatorial elections

== Notes ==
Preceded by 1994	South Carolina gubernatorial elections	Succeeded by 2002
