= Michael R. Daniel =

American politician

84th Lieutenant Governor of South Carolina
- In office January 12, 1983 – January 14, 1987
- Governor: Richard Riley
- Preceded by: Nancy Stevenson
- Succeeded by: Nick Theodore

Personal details
- Born: April 13, 1940 (age 86) Gaffney, South Carolina, U.S.
- Party: Democratic
- Occupation: Attorney

Michael Roland Daniel (born April 13, 1940) served as the 84th lieutenant governor of South Carolina. He served from 1983 to 1987 concurrently with his fellow Democrat, Governor Richard Riley.

== Biography ==
Daniel was educated at the University of South Carolina, where he was a member of the Euphradian Society and graduated in 1962 with a B.A. in Journalism. He graduated from the USC School of Law in 1965.

To win the Democratic runoff election for lieutenant governor, Daniel defeated State Senator Tom Turnipseed, a lawyer from Columbia, who had renounced his opposition to school integration.

Daniel lost the race for governor in 1986 to Republican Carroll Campbell.

Party political offices
Preceded by Nancy Stevenson	Democratic nominee for Lieutenant Governor of South Carolina; 1982	Succeeded by Nick Theodore
Preceded by Richard Riley	Democratic nominee for Governor of South Carolina; 1986	Succeeded by Theo Mitchell
Political offices
Preceded by Nancy Stevenson	Lieutenant Governor of South Carolina; 1983–1987	Succeeded by Nick Theodore
