= 2002 South Carolina Secretary of State election =

- November 5, 2002
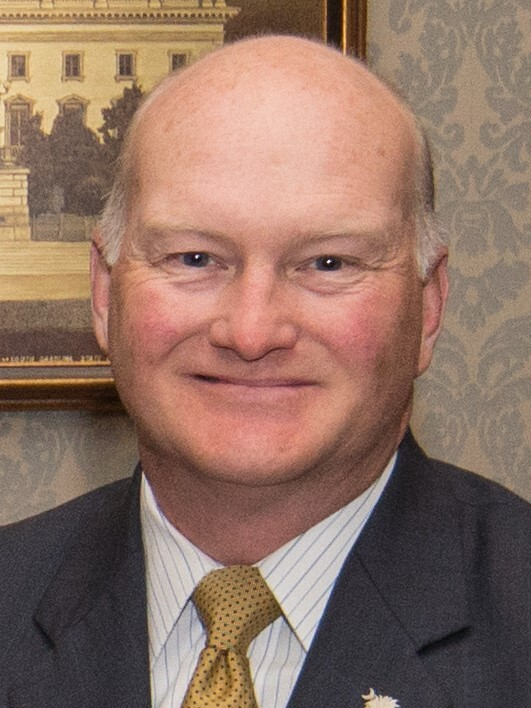

Candidate	Mark Hammond	Rick Wade
Party	Republican	Democratic
Popular vote	610,799	463,501
Percentage	56.8%	43.1%
- Hammond: 50–60% 60–70% 70–80% Wade: 50–60% 60–70% 70–80%
Secretary of State before election
Jim Miles
Republican
Elected Secretary of State
Mark Hammond
Republican

The 2002 South Carolina secretary of state election was held on November 5, 2002, to elect the secretary of state of South Carolina. Incumbent Republican secretary of state Jim Miles did not run for re-election. Republican nominee Mark Hammond defeated Rick Wade in the general election.

== Republican primary ==
=== Candidates ===
==== Nominee ====
- Mark Hammond, Spartanburg County clerk of court

==== Eliminated in runoff ====
- Ed McMullen, president of McMullen Public Affairs

==== Eliminated in primary ====
- Lois Eargle, Horry County auditor

=== Results ===
Republican primary
Party	Candidate	Votes	%
Republican	Mark Hammond	110,761	38.87
Republican	Ed McMullen	96,451	33.84
Republican	Lois Eargle	77,769	27.29
Total votes		284,981	100.00

=== Runoff ===
==== Results ====
Republican primary runoff
Party	Candidate	Votes	%
Republican	Mark Hammond	151,942	54.75
Republican	Ed McMullen	125,567	45.25
Total votes		277,509	100.00

== Democratic primary ==
=== Candidates ===
==== Nominee ====
- Rick Wade, director of the South Carolina Department of Alcohol and Other Drug Abuse Services

== General election ==
=== Results ===
2002 South Carolina secretary of state election
Party	Candidate	Votes	%
Republican	Mark Hammond	610,799	56.84
Democratic	Rick Wade	463,501	43.13
Write-in		291	0.03
Total votes		1,074,591	100.00
