= Senator Hayne =

Senator Hayne may refer to:

== Members of the United States Senate ==
- Arthur P. Hayne (1788–1867), U.S. Senator from South Carolina in 1858
- Robert Y. Hayne (1791–1839), U.S. Senator from South Carolina in 1823

== United States state senate members ==
- Charles D. Hayne (1844–1913), South Carolina State Senate
- Henry E. Hayne (fl. 1870s), South Carolina State Senate

== See also ==
- Senator Haynes (disambiguation)
