= 2018 South Carolina Secretary of State election =

- November 6, 2018
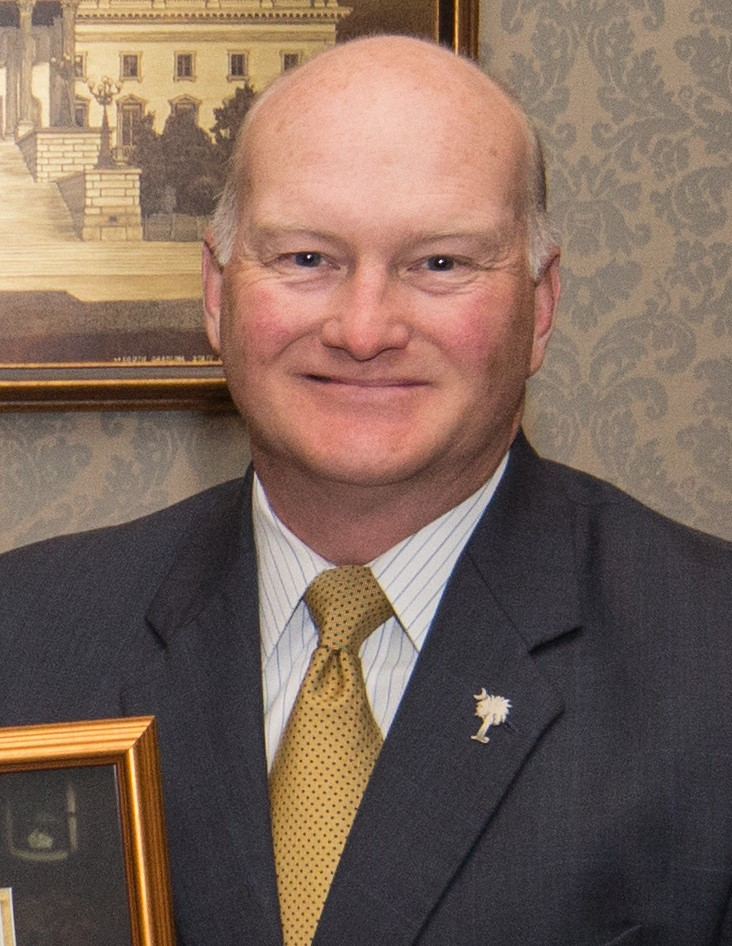

Candidate	Mark Hammond	Melvin T. Whittenburg
Party	Republican	Democratic
popular vote	970,576	727,952
Percentage	57.11%	42.83%
- Hammond: 50–60% 60–70% 70–80% 80–90% 90%+ Whittenburg: 50–60% 60–70% 70–80% 80–90% 90%+ Tie: 50%

The 2018 South Carolina Secretary of State election was held on November 6, 2018, to elect the secretary of state of South Carolina. Incumbent Republican Mark Hammond sought another term in office, running against Democratic challenger Melvin Whittenburg. Primary elections were held on June 12, 2018.

Republicans have held this office since 1991.

== Primary elections ==
=== Republican primary ===
Three other Republicans challenged Hammond in the Republican primary. Hammond won a majority of votes, avoiding the need for a runoff primary election and securing the Republican nomination.

State Representative and primary challenger Joshua Putnam criticized Hammond for his office's failure to place the state seal on over one hundred enacted laws, which is required by law. Hammond said the issue had been addressed, and that the enforceability of the implicated laws were not impacted.

The race focused on the use of technology in accomplishing the duties of the office. Hammond highlighted a crack-down on “disreputable charities” and increasing e-filing for businesses. His challengers argued the Secretary's office used outdated or poorly designed technology that was difficult for citizens and businesses to use.

=== Democratic primary. ===
Melvin Whittenburg was the sole-declared candidate and automatically became the Democratic nominee following the June 12 primary election.

== General election ==
Hammond defeated Whittenburg in the general election, winning a fifth term in office.

Whittenburg, a former Exonnmobile executive and soldier, argued that Hammond had been in office too long, the technology used by his office was too burdensome, and more investment needed to be made in bringing business opportunities to rural areas. Hammond stated his tenure produced more efficiency for businesses, contributed to the state's economic growth in the 2010s, and protected charitable donors. He also argued that his relationship with state lawmakers would better advance the goals of the office compared to a political newcomer like Whittenburg.

=== Predictions ===
Source	Ranking	As of
Governing Magazine	Safe R	October 11, 2018

=== Results ===
2018 South Carolina secretary of state election
Party	Candidate	Votes	%	±%
Republican	Mark Hammond (incumbent)	970,576	57.11%	−2.30%
Democratic	Melvin T Whittenburg	727,952	42.83%	+2.41%
Write-in		968	0.06%	±0.00%
Total votes		1,699,496	100.00%	
Republican hold				

County	Mark Hammond Republican		Melvin Whittenburg Democratic		Write-ins Other parties	
County	#	%	#	%	#	%
Abbeville	5,629	65.86%	2,916	34.12%	2	0.02%
Aiken	37,878	63.69%	21,556	36.25%	38	0.06%
Allendale	641	23.88%	2,100	76.62%	0	0.00%
Anderson	45,187	72.11%	17,454	27.85%	27	0.04%
Bamberg	1,619	37.16%	2,736	62.79%	2	0.05%
Barnwell	3,883	53.44%	3,383	46.56%	0	0.00%
Beaufort	40,213	57.37%	29,847	42.59%	28	0.04%
Berkeley	36,900	56.44%	28,438	43.49%	43	0.07%
Calhoun	3,108	52.37%	2,825	47.61%	1	0.02%
Charleston	67,569	46.35%	78,098	53.57%	102	0.07%
Cherokee	11,974	71.86%	4,685	28.12%	3	0.02%
Chester	5,796	53.37%	5,056	46.56%	7	0.06%
Chesterfield	6,890	57.59%	5,068	42.36%	5	0.04%
Clarendon	5,937	49.24%	6,118	50.74%	3	0.02%
Colleton	7,242	54.89%	5,948	45.08%	4	0.03%
Darlington	12,163	52.42%	11,031	47.54%	7	0.03%
Dillon	4,106	50.37%	4,043	49.61%	2	0.02%
Dorchester	28,798	56.99%	21,715	42.97%	24	0.05%
Edgefield	5,741	61.38%	3,609	38.59%	3	0.03%
Fairfield	3,589	38.97%	5,614	60.96%	5	0.05%
Florence	23,762	52.37%	21,593	47.58%	21	0.05%
Georgetown	14,694	56.99%	11,085	42.99%	4	0.02%
Greenville	108,826	62.19%	67,042	38.31%	133	0.08%
Greenwood	14,552	63.18%	8,471	36.78%	11	0.05%
Hampton	2,629	40.16%	3,915	59.79%	3	0.05%
Horry	73,846	66.94%	36,455	33.03%	47	0.04%
Jasper	4,451	47.71%	4,875	52.25%	4	0.04%
Kershaw	14,753	63.32%	8,525	36.59%	21	0.09%
Lancaster	20,703	62.93%	12,177	37.01%	15	0.05%
Laurens	13,394	66.07%	6,862	33.86%	15	0.07%
Lee	2,217	34.91%	4,131	65.05%	2	0.03%
Lexington	68,018	68.86%	30,693	31.07%	74	0.07%
Marion	4,020	38.61%	6,389	61.37%	2	0.02%
Marlboro	3,223	42.07%	4,435	57.90%	3	0.04%
McCormick	2,354	53.30%	2,062	46.70%	0	0.00%
Newberry	8,246	63.56%	4,719	36.36%	9	0.07%
Oconee	20,486	74.52%	6,995	25.45%	12	0.04%
Orangeburg	9,564	31.27%	21,010	68.69%	12	0.04%
Pickens	29,371	76.30%	9,103	23.65%	20	0.05%
Richland	48,372	34.43%	92,000	65.48%	123	0.09%
Saluda	4,705	68.73%	2,136	31.21%	5	0.07%
Spartanburg	62,023	65.48%	32,648	34.47%	56	0.06%
Sumter	15,102	43.99%	19,211	55.96%	11	0.03%
Union	5,352	60.11%	3,547	39.85%	4	0.04%
Williamsburg	3,894	33.72%	7,650	66.25%	5	0.04%
York	57,156	60.04%	37,983	39.90%	50	0.05%
Totals	970,576	57.1%	727,952	42.8%	968	0.1%

Counties that flipped from Democratic to Republican

- Calhoun (largest town: St. Matthews)
- Darlington (largest city: Hartsville)
- Dillon (largest city: Dillon)
