= 2014 South Carolina Secretary of State election =

- November 4, 2014
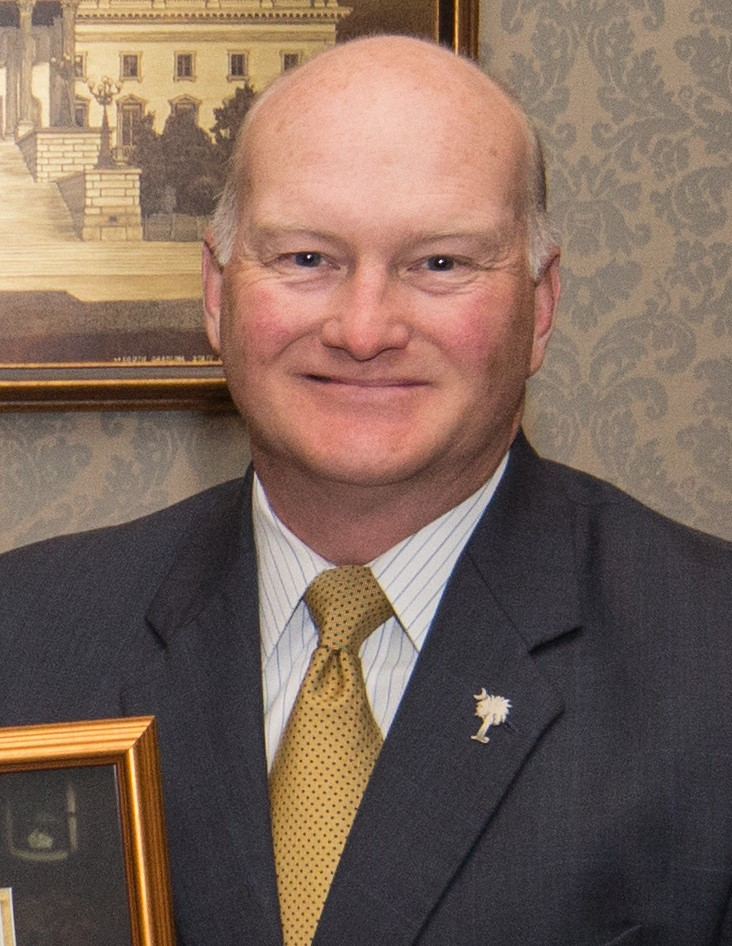

| Candidate | Mark Hammond | Ginny Deerin |
| Party | Republican | Democratic |
| popular vote | 730,739 | 496,344 |
| Percentage | 59.41% | 40.42% |
- County results Hammond: 50–60% 60–70% 70–80% Deerin: 50–60% 60–70% 70–80%

The 2014 South Carolina Secretary of State election took place on November 4, 2014, to elect the secretary of state of South Carolina. Incumbent Republican Mark Hammond (American politician) sought another term in office, running against Democratic challenger Ginny Deerin. Primary elections were held on June 10, 2014.

== Primary elections ==
Neither candidate faced a primary opponent, and each became their repsective party's nominee following the June 10 primary.

Hammond was endorsed by South Carolina Citizens for Life (a pro-life advocacy organization) and the South Carolina Association of Realtors.

Deerin was endorsed by the South Carolina Club for Growth, the first Democrat to receive its endorsement in a state-wide race. She also received an endorsement from the South Carolina Libertarian Party.

== General election ==
Hammond defeated Deerin, winning a fourth term in office.

Deerin advocated for increasing the technological footprint of the secretary's office, claiming that only four of the office's 129 functions were available online. She leverged her experience as a non-profit leader to argue she was prepared to improve the efficiency of the office which she described as "broken".
