= 2010 South Carolina Secretary of State election =

- November 2, 2010
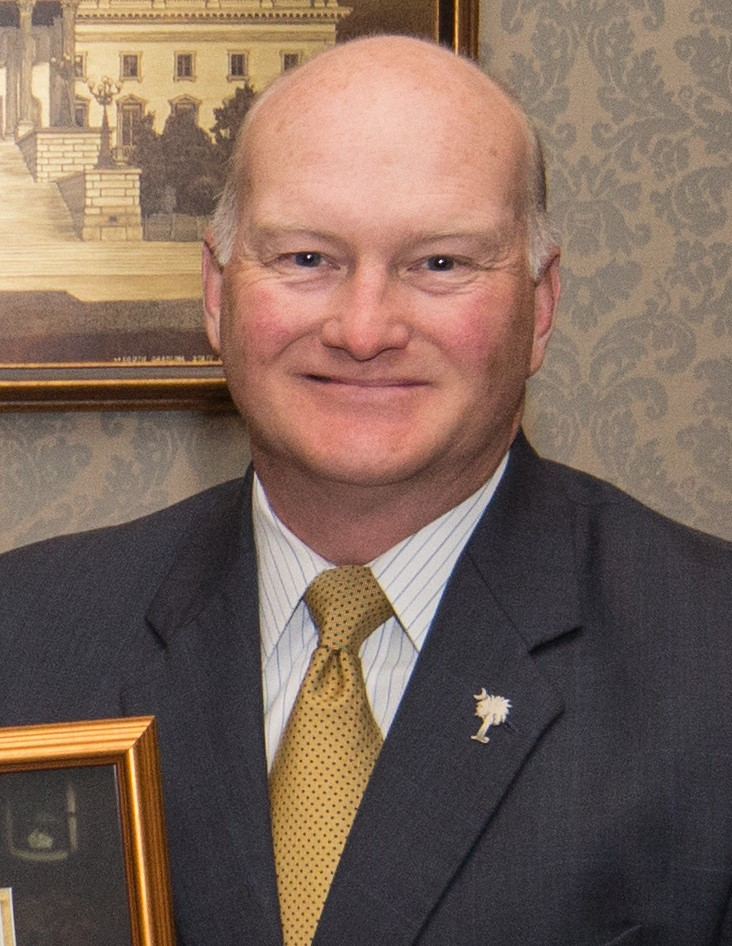

Candidate	Mark Hammond	Marjorie Johnson
Party	Republican	Democratic
popular vote	805,783	516,414
Percentage	60.90%	39.04%
- County results Hammond: 0–15%% +15–30% +30% Johnson: 0–15% +15–30% +30%

The 2010 South Carolina Secretary of State election took place on November 2, 2010, to elect the secretary of state of South Carolina. Incumbent Republican Mark Hammond (American politician) sought a third term in office, running against Democratic challenger Marjorie Johnson. Primary elections were held on June 8, 2014.

== Primary elections ==
Neither candidate faced a primary opponent, and each became their respective party's nominee following the June 8 primary.

== General election ==
Hammond defeated Johnson, winning a third term in office. He pledged to use his term to combat counterfeit merchandise and expand protections for charitable donors.

Johnson, a retired public relations executive, stated the position of Secretary of State should be appointed, rather than elected, and said she'd encourage the state legislature to give the secretary more enforcement authority. She said she ran for the office to increase the number of women in elected office. She was endorsed by the AFL-CIO and the Communications Workers of America.

2010 South Carolina secretary of state election
Party	Candidate	Votes	%	±%
Republican	Mark Hammond (incumbent)	805,783	60.91%	−0.33%
Democratic	Marjorie L. Johnson	56,414	39.04%	+0.34%
Write-in		968	0.05%	+0.01%
Total votes		1,322,835	100.00%	
Republican hold				

County	Mark Hammond Republican		Marjori Democratic		Write-ins Other parties	
County	#	%	#	%	#	%
Abbeville	4,226	58.44%	2,998	41.46%	7	0.10%
Aiken	32,547	67.27%	15,823	32.70%	15	0.03%
Allendale	658	26.42%	1,832	73.54%	1	0.03%
Anderson	35,314	71.81%	13,839	28.15%	22	0.04%
Bamberg	1,790	37.91%	2,932	62.09%	0	0.00%
Barnwell	3,659	53.72%	3,150	46.24%	0	0.04%
Beaufort	32,437	64.57%	17,782	35.39%	20	0.04%
Berkeley	26,373	62.55%	15,767	37.40%	23	0.05%
Calhoun	3,031	52.41%	2,750	47.56%	2	0.03%
Charleston	56,040	56.07%	43,846	43.87%	62	0.06%
Cherokee	9,817	69.20%	4,365	30.77%	4	0.06%
Chester	4,640	49.94%	4,648	50.02%	3	0.03%
Chesterfield	5,796	52.70%	5,199	47.27%	4	0.04%
Clarendon	5,272	47.20%	5,892	52.75%	6	0.05%
Colleton	7,187	56.58%	5,514	43.40%	3	0.02%
Darlington	10,962	51.85%	10,179	48.14%	4	0.02%
Dillon	3,668	47.46%	4,060	52.54%	1	0.01%
Dorchester	22,665	64.17%%	12,647	35.80%	17	0.05%
Edgefield	4,797	59.07%	3,324	40.93%	0	0.00%
Fairfield	3,379	38.91%	5,303	61.06%	3	0.03%
Florence	22,322	55.84%	17,643	44.14%	8	0.02%
Georgetown	12,272	58.43%	8,721	41.52%	11	0.05%
Greenville	91,588	63.16%	39,482	30.10%	84	0.06%
Greenwood	12,575	63.16%	7,313	36.73%	23	0.12%
Hampton	2,413	38.94%	3,782	61.03%	2	0.03%
Horry	48,293	70.54%	20,150	29.43%	22	0.03%
Jasper	2,588	42.06%	3,564	57.92%	1	0.02%
Kershaw	13,608	63.27%	7,884	36.66%	14	0.07%
Lancaster	14,143	64.16%	7,890	35.79%	8	0.04%
Laurens	10,901	63.48%	6,264	36.47%	9	0.05%
Lee	2,302	35.21%	4,235	64.77%	2	0.03%
Lexington	61,670	75.28%	20,207	24.67%	53	0.06%
Marion	4,021	39.34%	6,200	60.66%	0	0.00%
Marlboro	2,711	38.18%	4,389	61.82%	0	0.00%
McCormick	2,061	52.46%	1,868	47.54%	0	0.00%
Newberry	7,618	63.59%	4,357	36.37%	5	0.04%
Oconee	15,523	75.03%	5,158	24.93%	9	0.04%
Orangeburg	9,178	32.62%	18,952	67.37%	5	0.02%
Pickens	23,427	78.20%	6,504	21.71%	27	0.09%
Richland	48,699	42.24%	66,502	57.68%	75	0.07%
Saluda	3,968	63.77%	2,255	36.24%	0	0.00%
Spartanburg	51,306	70.02%	21,935	29.93%	38	0.05%
Sumter	14,046	46.99%	15,847	53.00%	11	0.04%
Union	5,152	57.10%	3,864	42.82%	7	0.08%
Williamsburg	3,698	32.55%	7,664	67.43%	2	0.02%
York	45,442	67.42%	21,934	32.55%	22	0.03%
Totals	805,783	60.90%	516,414	39%	638	0.1%
