= 2022 South Carolina Secretary of State election =

- November 8, 2022
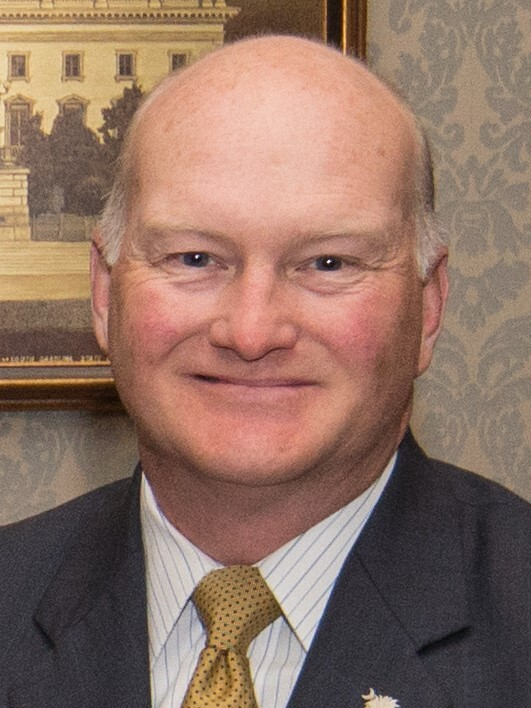

Nominee	Mark Hammond	Rosemounda Peggy Butler
Party	Republican	Democratic
Popular vote	1,071,907	619,089
Percentage	63.33%	36.61%
- Hammond: 50–60% 60–70% 70–80% 80–90% >90% Butler: 40–50% 50–60% 60–70% 70–80% 80–90% >90% No data
Secretary of State before election
Mark Hammond
Republican
Elected Secretary of State
Mark Hammond
Republican

The 2022 South Carolina Secretary of State election was held on November 8, 2022, to elect the Secretary of State of South Carolina. Incumbent Republican Mark Hammond was seeking another term in office against Democratic challenger Rosemounda Peggy Butler, after defeating an opponent in the Republican primary. The last Democratic Secretary of State of South Carolina was John T. Campbell in 1991. Primary elections were held on June 14, 2022. Hammond defeated his Democratic opponent and retained his seat.

== Republican primary ==
Primary results by county Hammond: 60–70% 70–80% 80–90%

=== Candidates ===
- Keith Blanford, businessman and perennial candidate
- Mark Hammond, incumbent secretary of state

=== Results ===
South Carolina Secretary of State Republican primary election, 2022
Party	Candidate	Votes	%
Republican	Mark Hammond (incumbent)	257,131	75.1%
Republican	Keith Blanford	85,050	24.9%
Total votes		342,181	100%

== Democratic primary ==
=== Candidates ===
==== Declared ====
- Rosemounda Peggy Butler, former West Columbia councilwoman

== General election ==
=== Predictions ===
Source	Ranking	As of
Sabato's Crystal Ball	Safe R	December 1, 2021
Elections Daily	Safe R	November 7, 2022

=== Results ===
2022 South Carolina Secretary of State election
Party	Candidate	Votes	%
Republican	Mark Hammond (incumbent)	1,071,451	63.33%
Democratic	Rosemounda Peggy Butler	619,341	36.61%
Write-in		1,109	0.07%
Total votes		1,691,901	100.00%
Republican hold			

==== By county ====
County	Mark Hammond Republican		Rosemounda Peggy Butler Democratic		Write-in Various		Margin		Total
County	#	%	#	%	#	%	#	%	Total
Abbeville	6,240	72.99%	2,306	26.97%	3	0.04%	3,934	46.02%	8,549
Aiken	37,679	68.82%	17,025	31.10%	44	0.08%	20,654	37.73%	54,748
Allendale	589	32.78%	1,208	67.22%	0	0.00%	-619	-34.45%	1,797
Anderson	48,847	77.36%	14,265	22.59%	29	0.05%	34,582	54.77%	63,141
Bamberg	1,833	46.28%	2,127	53.70%	1	0.03%	-294	-7.42%	3,961
Barnwell	3,802	60.74%	2,453	39.19%	4	0.06%	1,349	21.55%	6,259
Beaufort	44,911	63.12%	26,180	36.79%	60	0.08%	18,731	26.33%	71,151
Berkeley	44,014	62.14%	26,763	37.79%	50	0.07%	17,251	24.36%	70,827
Calhoun	3,471	62.02%	2,123	37.93%	3	0.05%	1,348	24.08%	5,597
Charleston	78,695	52.15%	72,104	47.78%	100	0.07%	6,591	4.37%	150,899
Cherokee	12,813	79.46%	3,308	20.51%	5	0.03%	9,505	58.94%	16,126
Chester	6,084	63.41%	3,505	36.53%	5	0.05%	2,579	26.88%	9,594
Chesterfield	8,342	66.68%	4,164	33.29%	4	0.03%	4,178	33.40%	12,510
Clarendon	6,660	58.48%	4,722	41.46%	6	0.05%	1,938	17.02%	11,388
Colleton	7,774	62.22%	4,715	37.74%	5	0.04%	3,059	24.48%	12,494
Darlington	12,207	61.11%	7,760	38.85%	8	0.04%	4,447	22.26%	19,975
Dillon	4,435	56.64%	3,391	43.31%	4	0.05%	1,044	13.33%	7,830
Dorchester	30,357	61.66%	18,837	38.26%	40	0.08%	11,520	23.40%	49,234
Edgefield	6,140	69.79%	2,655	30.18%	3	0.03%	3,485	39.61%	8,798
Fairfield	3,956	47.65%	4,333	52.19%	13	0.16%	-377	-4.54%	8,302
Florence	24,385	59.08%	16,863	40.85%	30	0.07%	7,522	18.22%	41,278
Georgetown	17,484	64.03%	9,819	35.96%	4	0.01%	7,665	28.07%	27,307
Greenville	117,887	66.62%	58,922	33.30%	149	0.08%	58,965	33.32%	176,958
Greenwood	15,021	69.16%	6,684	30.77%	15	0.07%	8,337	38.38%	21,720
Hampton	2,805	50.30%	2,769	49.66%	2	0.04%	36	0.65%	5,576
Horry	97,236	73.07%	35,804	26.90%	39	0.03%	61,432	46.16%	133,079
Jasper	6,557	59.13%	4,524	40.79%	9	0.08%	2,033	18.33%	11,090
Kershaw	15,203	68.21%	7,073	31.73%	14	0.06%	8,130	36.47%	22,290
Lancaster	23,523	68.10%	10,999	31.84%	20	0.06%	12,524	36.26%	34,542
Laurens	14,557	73.67%	5,175	26.19%	28	0.14%	9,382	47.48%	19,760
Lee	2,217	42.38%	3,010	57.54%	4	0.08%	-793	-15.16%	5,231
Lexington	71,308	72.14%	27,458	27.78%	80	0.08%	43,850	44.36%	98,846
Marion	4,025	48.12%	4,336	51.84%	3	0.04%	-311	-3.72%	8,364
Marlboro	3,353	51.78%	3,122	48.21%	1	0.02%	231	3.57%	6,476
McCormick	2,799	61.33%	1,765	38.67%	0	0.00%	1,034	22.66%	4,564
Newberry	9,109	71.34%	3,654	28.62%	5	0.04%	5,455	42.72%	12,768
Oconee	22,893	79.31%	5,955	20.63%	17	0.06%	16,938	58.68%	28,865
Orangeburg	10,065	38.59%	16,010	61.38%	8	0.03%	-5,945	-22.79%	26,083
Pickens	31,936	79.85%	8,037	20.09%	23	0.06%	23,899	59.75%	39,996
Richland	48,898	38.76%	77,146	61.14%	125	0.10%	-28,248	-22.39%	126,169
Saluda	4,973	76.07%	1,562	23.89%	2	0.03%	3,411	52.18%	6,537
Spartanburg	68,926	71.25%	27,737	28.67%	73	0.08%	41,189	42.58%	96,736
Sumter	15,270	49.97%	15,278	50.00%	11	0.04%	-8	-0.03%	30,559
Union	6,024	69.82%	2,595	30.08%	9	0.10%	3,429	39.74%	8,628
Williamsburg	4,093	42.19%	5,604	57.76%	5	0.05%	-1,511	-15.57%	9,702
York	62,055	64.91%	33,496	35.04%	46	0.05%	28,559	29.87%	95,597
Totals	1,071,451	63.33%	619,341	36.61%	1,109	0.07%	452,110	26.72%	1,691,901

Counties that flipped from Democratic to Republican

- Charleston (largest municipality: Charleston)
- Hampton (largest municipality: Hampton)
- Jasper (largest municipality: Hardeeville)
- Clarendon (largest municipality: Manning)
- Marlboro (largest municipality: Bennettsville)

==== By congressional district ====
Hammond won six of seven congressional districts.

District	Hammond	Peggy Butler	Representative
1st	62%	38%	Nancy Mace
2nd	63%	37%	Joe Wilson
3rd	75%	25%	Jeff Duncan
4th	67%	33%	William Timmons
5th	66%	34%	Ralph Norman
6th	41%	59%	Jim Clyburn
7th	67%	33%	Tom Rice (117th Congress)
7th	67%	33%	Russell Fry (118th Congress)
