= Silverman v. Campbell =

1997 South Carolina Supreme Court Decision

Silverman v. Campbell, et al.
- Court: South Carolina Supreme Court
- Full case name: Herb Silverman v. Carol A. Campbell, et al.
- Argued: October 3, 1996 1996
- Decided: May 27, 1997 1997
- Citation: 326 S.C. 208 (1997) 486 S.E.2d 1

Holding
- The Court held that the Constitution of South Carolina articles requiring belief in a supreme being to be in violation of the First Amendment and the No Religious Test Clause of the U. S. Constitution

Court membership
- Chief judge: Ernest A. Finney, Jr.
- Associate judges: Jean Toal, James E. Moore, John H. Waller, E. C. Burnett, III

Case opinions
- Majority: Finney
- Concurrence: Toal, Moore, Waller, Burnett

Laws applied
- Article VI, section 3 of the U.S. Constitution

Silverman v. Campbell was a South Carolina Supreme Court case regarding the constitutionality of a provision in the South Carolina Constitution requiring an oath to God for employment in the public sector.

== Details ==
In 1992, Herb Silverman was a mathematics professor at the College of Charleston who applied to become a notary public. Silverman had earlier run for the post of Governor of South Carolina. Silverman declared himself an Atheist but also joined a Unitarian Church. His application was rejected after he crossed off the phrase "So help me God" from the oath, which was required by the South Carolina State Constitution. Silverman filed a lawsuit naming Governor Carroll Campbell and Secretary of State Jim Miles as defendants. After a lower court made a ruling in favor of Silverman, the state appealed to the Supreme Court contending that the case was not about religion.

The South Carolina Supreme Court, in a unanimous decision, ruled that Article VI, section 2 and Article XVII, section 4 of the South Carolina Constitution—both of which state, "No person who denies the existence of a Supreme Being shall hold any office under this Constitution"—could not be enforced because they violated the First Amendment protection of free exercise of religion and the Article VI, section 3 of the United States Constitution banning the use of a religious test for public office. Current precedent holds that these provisions are binding on the states under the Fourteenth Amendment.

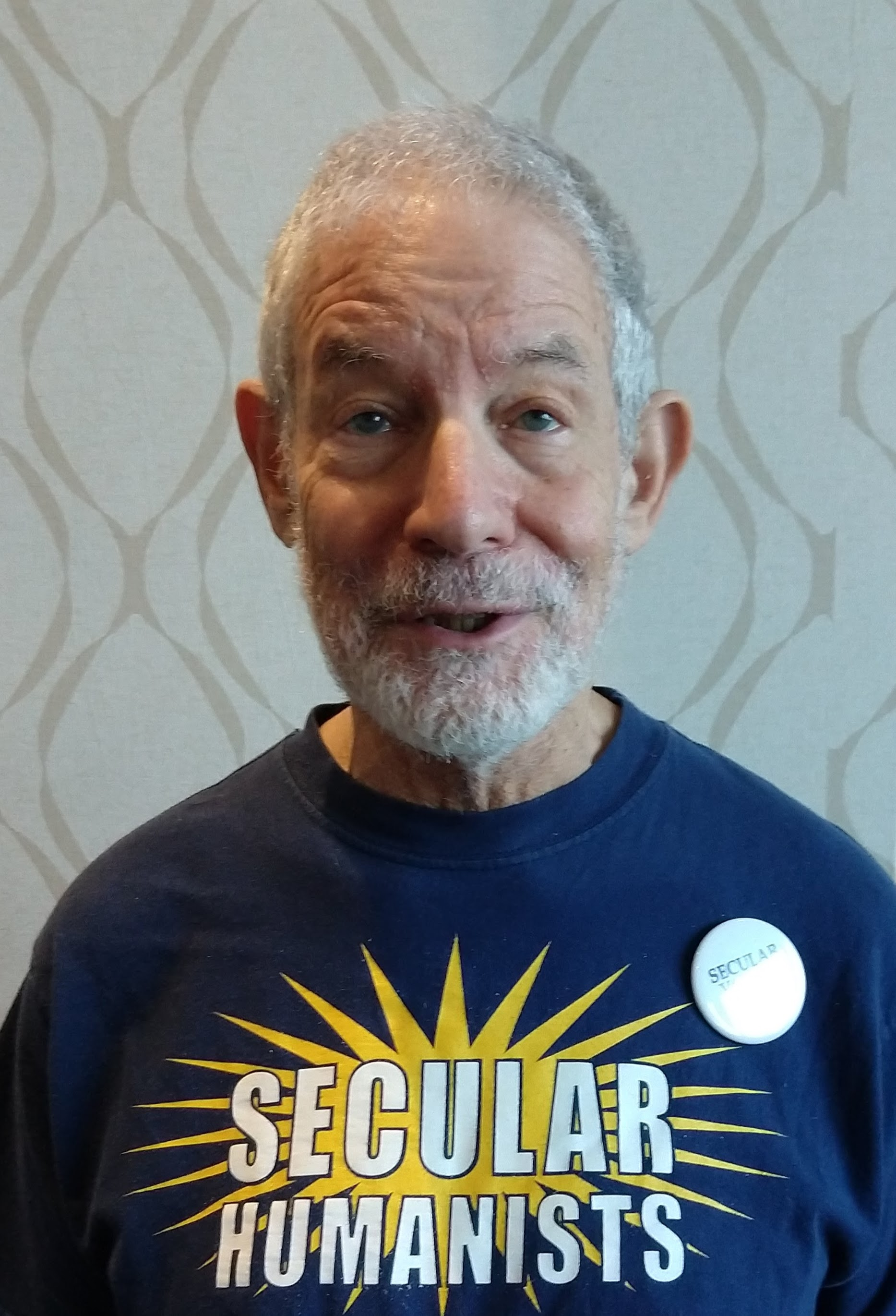
Herb Silverman in 2018. President Emeritus of the Secular Coalition for America, and a former board member of the American Humanist Association.

== See also ==
- Torcaso v. Watkins (a similar case in Maryland)
- Secular Coalition for America, an atheist advocacy group founded by Silverman
