= Enterprise Railroad (South Carolina) =

Enterprise Railroad (legal name Enterprise Railroad Company, of Charleston) was a horse-drawn rail business for moving freight and passengers in Charleston, South Carolina. It was established with an African American board of directors. Draymen protested that it would compete with their business. Control of the business was eventually taken over by whites.

The business was chartered in 1870 and its rail lines built in 1874. The line was charted to lay tracks from the Battery, or "White Point Garden," on East Bay street, in the city of Charleston to "Ten Mile Hill." Directors of the company included Reconstruction era legislators, including Robert C. De Large, Alonzo J. Ransier, William Whipper, Thaddeus Sasportas, Robert B. Elliott, Joseph Rainey, William M. Thomas, Lucius Wimbush, William McKinlay, Henry J. Maxwell, John B. Wright, William T. Elfe, Robert Smalls, Charles D. Hayne, Edmund W. M. Mackey, and others.

== See also ==
- Horse-drawn omnibus
