= 2026 South Carolina Secretary of State election =

- November 3, 2026
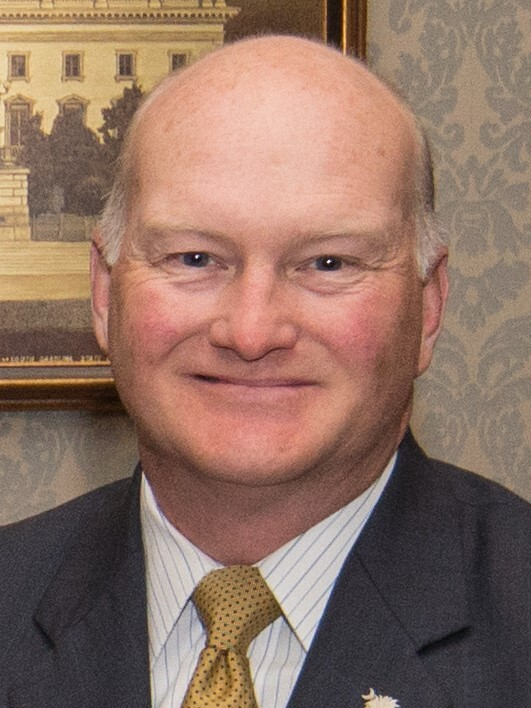

Candidate	Mark Hammond	Jason Belton
Party	Republican	Democratic
Popular vote	1,073,786	952,207
Percentage	53.00%	47.00%
- County results Hammond: 50–60% 60–70% 70–80% Belton: 50–60% 60–70% 70–80%
Secretary of State before election
Mark Hammond
Republican
Elected Secretary of State
Mark Hammond
Republican

The 2026 South Carolina Secretary of State election was held on November 3, 2026, to elect the Secretary of State of South Carolina to a four-year term. Incumbent Republican secretary of state Mark Hammond ran for re-election, defeating Democrat Jason Belton in the general election.

== Republican primary ==
=== Candidates ===
==== Nominee ====
- Mark Hammond, incumbent secretary of state

== Democratic primary ==
=== Candidates ===
==== Nominee ====
- Jason Belton, Vice President of the Greater Columbia Central Labor Council

==== Eliminated in primary ====
- Edwina Winter, realtor

=== Results ===
Primary results by county: Belton: 50–60%; 60–70%; 70–80%; Winter: 50–60%; 60–70%

Democratic primary results
Party	Candidate	Votes	%
Democratic	Jason Belton	179,783	50.6
Democratic	Edwina Winter	175,763	49.4
Total votes		355,546	100.0

== General election ==
=== Predictions ===
Source	Ranking	As of
Sabato's Crystal Ball	Safe R	August 7, 2025

=== Results ===
2026 South Carolina Secretary of State election
Party	Candidate	Votes	%	±%
Republican	Mark Hammond (incumbent)	1,073,652	52.97%	
Democratic	Jason Belton	952,186	46.98%	
Write-in		961	0.05%	
Total votes		2,026,799	100.0	
