= 2018 South Carolina elections =

- November 6, 2018

A general election was held in the U.S. state of South Carolina on November 6, 2018. All of South Carolina's executive officers were up for election, as well as all of South Carolina's seven seats in the United States House of Representatives.

== United States Congress ==
All of South Carolina's seven seats in the United States House of Representatives were up for election in 2018.

== Governor and lieutenant governor ==
Beginning with the 2018 gubernatorial election, the offices of governor and lieutenant governor were elected jointly as a ticket instead of being elected separately as in prior years.

Former incumbent Republican governor Nikki Haley was term-limited and could not run for re-election to a third consecutive term. Haley was selected as United States Ambassador to the United Nations in the Donald Trump administration. Haley's nomination was confirmed. Former lieutenant governor Henry McMaster became governor on January 24, 2017, for the remainder of the term.

2018 South Carolina gubernatorial election
Party	Candidate	Votes	%	±%
Republican	Henry McMaster (incumbent)	921,342	53.96%	−1.94%
Democratic	James Smith	784,182	45.92%	+4.50%
Write-in		2,045	0.12%	+0.05%
Total votes		1,707,569	100.00%	N/A
Republican hold				

== Attorney General ==
Incumbent Republican attorney general Alan Wilson won re-election to a third term.

2018 South Carolina Attorney General election
- November 6, 2018
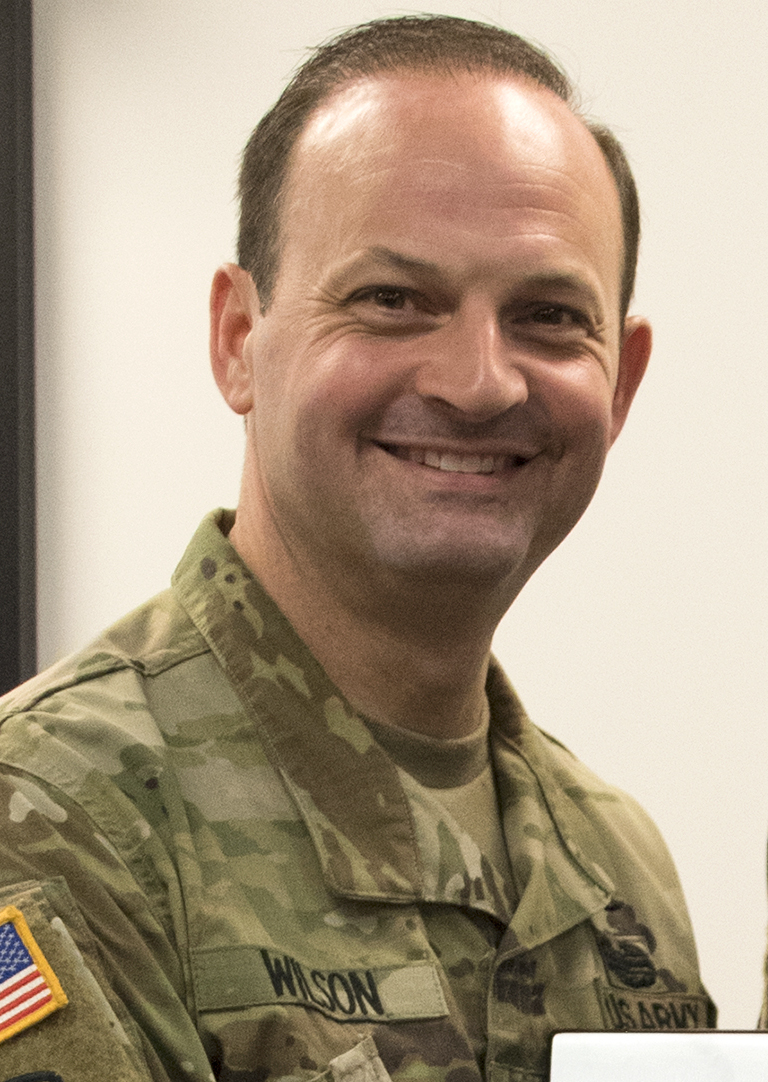

Candidate	Alan Wilson	Constance Anastopoulo
Party	Republican	Democratic
Alliance		Working Families
popular vote	938,032	764,806
Percentage	55.95%	42.48%
- Wilson: 50–60% 60–70% 70–80% 80–90% >90% Anastopoulo: 50–60% 60–70% 70–80% 80–90% >90% Tie: 50%

=== Predictions ===
Source	Ranking	As of
Governing	Lean R	October 26, 2018

=== Results ===
2018 South Carolina Attorney General election
Party	Candidate	Votes	%	±%
Republican	Alan Wilson (incumbent)	938,032	55.05%	−5.21%
Democratic	Constance Anastopoulo (Note: Anastopoulo ran as both a candidate for the Democratic and Working Families parties. Her vote total is a combination of votes cast for both parties.)	764,806	44.89%	+5.22%
Write-in		996	0.06%	-0.01%
Total votes		1,703,834	100.00%	
Republican hold				

== Secretary of State ==
Incumbent Republican secretary of state Mark Hammond won re-election to a fifth term in office. Governing magazine had projected the race as "safe Republican".

2018 South Carolina Secretary of State election
- November 6, 2018
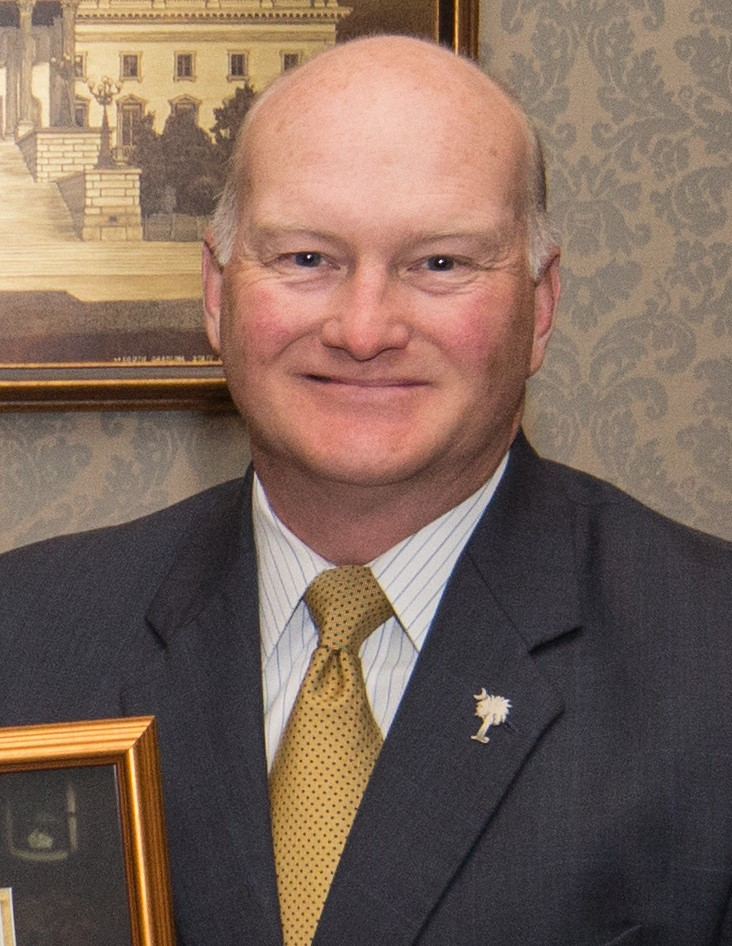

Candidate	Mark Hammond	Melvin T. Whittenburg
Party	Republican	Democratic
popular vote	970,576	727,952
Percentage	57.11%	42.83%
- Hammond: 50–60% 60–70% 70–80% 80–90% >90% Whittenburg: 50–60% 60–70% 70–80% 80–90% >90% Tie: 50%

2018 South Carolina Secretary of State election
Party	Candidate	Votes	%	±%
Republican	Mark Hammond (incumbent)	970,576	57.11%	−2.30%
Democratic	Melvin T Whittenburg	727,952	42.83%	+2.41%
Write-in		968	0.06%	±0.00%
Total votes		1,699,496	100.00%	
Republican hold				

== Treasurer ==
Incumbent Republican Treasurer Curtis Loftis won re-election to a third term in office.

2018 South Carolina Treasurer election
- November 6, 2018
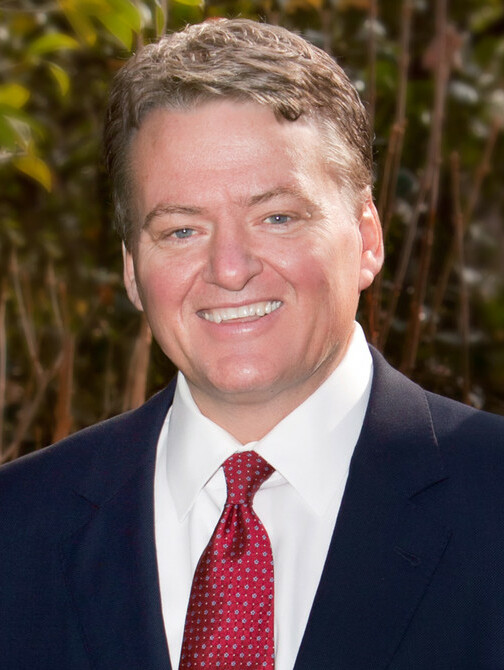

Candidate	Curtis Loftis	Rosalyn L. Glenn
Party	Republican	Democratic
Alliance		Working Families
popular vote	952,233	722,977
Percentage	55.11%	44.83%
- Loftis: 40–50% 50–60% 60–70% 70–80% 80–90% >90% Glenn: 40–50% 50–60% 60–70% 70–80% 80–90% >90% Tie: 40–50% 50%

2018 South Carolina State Treasurer election
Party	Candidate	Votes	%
Republican	Curtis Loftis (incumbent)	952,233	55.95%
Democratic	Rosalyn Glenn (Note: Glenn ran as both a candidate for the Democratic and Working Families parties. Her vote total is a combination of votes cast for both parties.)	722,977	42.48%
American	Sarah Work	25,979	1.53%
Write-in		711	0.04%
Total votes		1,701,900	100.00%
Republican hold			

== Comptroller General ==
Incumbent Republican Richard Eckstrom won re-election to a fifth term in office uncontested.

2018 South Carolina Comptroller General election
- November 6, 2018
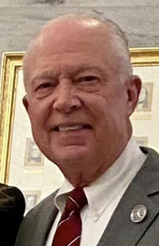

Candidate	Richard Eckstrom
Party	Republican	Write-ins
popular vote	1,136,932	26,028
Percentage	97.76%	2.24%
- Eckstrom: 70–80% 80–90% >90%

2018 South Carolina Camptroller General election
Party	Candidate	Votes	%
Republican	Richard Eckstrom (incumbent)	1,136,932	97.76%
Write-ins	Write-in	26,028	2.24%
Total votes		1,162,960	100.00%
Republican hold			

== Superintendent of Education ==
Incumbent Republican Superintendent of Education Molly Spearman won re-election to a second term.

2018 South Carolina Superintendent of Education election
- November 6, 2018
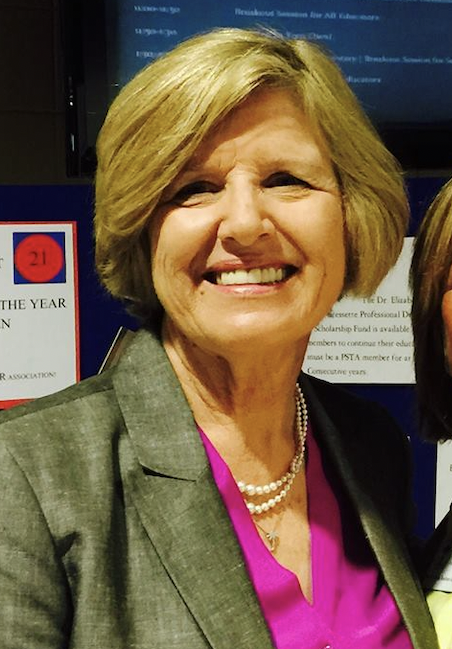

Candidate	Molly Spearman
Party	Republican	Write-ins
popular vote	998,057	18,866
Percentage	98.14%	1.86%
- Mitchell Spearman: 70–80% 80–90% >90%

2018 South Carolina Superintendent of Education election
Party	Candidate	Votes	%
Republican	Molly Spearman (incumbent)	998,057	98.14%
Write-ins	Write-in	18,866	1.86%
Total votes		1,016,923	100.00%
Republican hold			

== Commissioner of Agriculture ==
Final results by county: Weathers: 40–50%; 50–60%; 60–70%; 70–80%; 80–90%

Incumbent Republican Commissioner of Agriculture Hugh Weathers, who was appointed to the position in September 2004, won re-election to a fourth full term in office.

2018 South Carolina Commissioner of Agriculture election
Party	Candidate	Votes	%
Republican	Hugh Weathers (incumbent)	1,015,366	75.70%
Green	David Edmond	202,238	15.08%
United Citizens	Chris Nelums	118,671	8.85%
Write-in		5,025	0.37%
Total votes		1,341,300	100.00%
Republican hold			

== State legislature ==
All 124 seats in the South Carolina House of Representatives were up for election in 2018. On election day 2018, Republicans controlled 80 seats as compared to the Democrats' 44. Although four seats flipped party, there was no net change in the composition of the state House because Republicans flipped Districts 42 and 97 while Democrats flipped Districts 15 and 117. Republicans maintained their 80-to-44-seat majority in the South Carolina House following the 2018 election.
