= William R. Jervey =

South Carolina politician

William R. Jervey was a member of the South Carolina House of Representatives during the Reconstruction era, and then a state senator.

His term in office began in 1868 as representative until 1872, then as senator from 1872 until 1876 and he represented Charleston County.

He active in the South Carolina Republican Party.

He was involved in a bribery investigation of several politicians.

He was on the board of directors of the Enterprise Railroad.
