= 33rd United States Colored Infantry Regiment =

The 33rd United States Colored Infantry Regiment was a U.S.C.T. infantry regiment of the Union Army during the American Civil War. It was re-organized from the colored 1st South Carolina Infantry in February 1864. It served with the Department of the South in South Carolina until it was mustered out on January 31, 1866. Henry E. Hayne, the future Secretary of State of South Carolina, served as the regiment's commissary sergeant.

== See also ==
- List of United States Colored Troops Civil War units

== Sources ==
- South Carolina Civil War soldiers
