= Rick Wade =

American businessman and politician

Rick C. Wade

Director of the South Carolina Department of Alcohol and Other Drug Abuse Services
- In office 1999–2002

Personal details
- Party: Democratic
- Education: University of South Carolina; Harvard University
- Profession: Businessman

Rick Wade is a South Carolina businessman and politician.

== Personal life and education ==
Wade holds a bachelor's degree in biology from the University of South Carolina, as well as an MPA from Harvard University.

== Career ==
Wade worked as an analyst for the South Carolina House Ways and Means Committee, as well as for the University of South Carolina.

Wade was a self-employed consultant with the Wade Group and a senior vice president with Greentech Automotive. Wade has also been an executive with Hoffmann-La Roche, Fowler Communications, and Palmetto GBA. He is currently Vice President of Strategic Alliances and Outreach at the United States Chamber of Commerce.

== Political career ==
Wade served as the chief of staff of Lieutenant Governor Nick Theodore. Wade then served in the administration of Governor Jim Hodges as director of the South Carolina Department of Alcohol and Other Drug Abuse Services. In 2002, Wade ran for the office of Secretary of State, losing to Republican Mark Hammond.

Wade served as an adviser to both of Barack Obama's presidential campaigns. Wade also served in the Obama administration as a senior adviser to Secretary of Commerce Gary Locke. Wade's duties included serving as a liaison to states, businesses, trade associations, minority communities, and other federal agencies. He also represented the Commerce Department at international forums and served on numerous presidential task forces. Wade's duties also included encouraging US businesses to invest in Haiti following the 2010 Haitian earthquake.

In December 2013, Wade announced his candidacy for the US Senate seat held by Republican incumbent Tim Scott in the 2014 election. Wade announced in March 2014 that he was dropping out of the race. Richland County Councilwoman Joyce Dickerson remained in the race, eventually becoming the Democratic Nominee.

Party political offices
Preceded by Roy B. Fairchild	Democratic nominee for Secretary of State of South Carolina; 2002	Succeeded by Cheryl L. Footman
