= Robert Maxcy McCown =

South Carolina Secretary of State

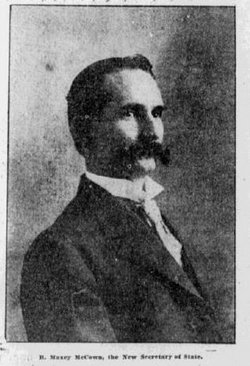

34th Secretary of State of South Carolina
- In office 1907–1917
- Governor: Martin F. Ansel; Coleman L. Blease; Charles A. Smith; Richard I. Manning III
- Preceded by: Jesse T. Gantt
- Succeeded by: William Dove

Personal details
- Party: Democratic Party
- Education: University of South Carolina
- Occupation: Politician, farmer

Robert Maxcy McCown (March 7, 1864 - November 28, 1948) was an American politician and farmer who was Secretary of State of South Carolina.

Prior to serving as Secretary of State he worked as Assistant Clerk of the South Carolina Senate (1890–1903) and was a member of the South Carolina State Constitutional Convention of 1895. The Convention of 1895's purpose was to roll back Reconstruction Era reforms instituted after the Civil War to protect African American rights. At the convention, Robert McCown was notable for introducing a resolution in support of female suffrage. This resolution was voted down by the general body and women would not be allowed to vote in South Carolina until the passage of the 19th amendment in 1920. However, he ignored pleas by Delegate Robert Smalls and others and supported the ratification of the new constitution that intentionally worked to disempower African American men and prevent them from holding office.

Robert McCown was married twice. First to Ms. Sallie Jane Galloway. The two had five children: Marion Ryan McCown, James Leon McCown, Emma Louise McCown, Moultrie Trescott McCown, and Cyril McCown. After Salie Galloway's death, Robert McCown married a distant cousin, MayBelle McCown. The two spent the latter half of their lives in Tryon, North Carolina. In Tryon, Robert and MayBelle were charter members of and helped to establish Tryon Presbyterian Church.
