= Enterprise Railroad =

Enterprise Railroad may refer to:

- Enterprise Railroad (Pennsylvania)
- Enterprise Railroad (South Carolina)
- Enterprise Railroad (New Jersey)
