= James Hayne =

American politician

James N. Hayne was a wealthy resident of Charleston, South Carolina who served in the state legislature. He had children with his African American wife Mary Hyne, a free black, including Henry Hayne, who served as Secretary of State of South Carolina. He and his brother Charles D. Hayne both served in the state legislature. representing Barnwell County in 1868. Robert Young Hayne was a family member.

He was an incorporator of the Enterprise Railroad Company of Charleston.
