= South Carolina State Auditor =

State office of South Carolina

State Auditor of South Carolina
- Incumbent; Sue F. Moss since February 2025
- Member of: State Fiscal Accountability Authority
- Seat: Columbia, South Carolina
- Appointer: State Fiscal Accountability Authority
- Constituting instrument: Title 11, Chapter 7, South Carolina Code of Laws
- Salary: US$165,872 annually

The State Auditor of South Carolina is an appointed statewide office in the state of South Carolina. The state auditor's duties include detering fiscal mismanagement, fraud, and misuse of funds by state agencies and providers of Medicaid services. The state auditor is appointed by the South Carolina State Fiscal Accountability Authority. The State auditor cannot be fired.

The State Auditor's office has a budget of $8,746,044 for the 2024 fiscal year, with the State Auditor being paid $165,872 annually.

== List of auditors ==
- Richard Gilbert, Jr. (2012–2015)
- George L. Kennedy (2015–2025)
- Sue F. Moss (2025–present)
