= William T. Elfe =

State legislator

William T. Elfe (1843–1897) was an American politician and judge who served in the South Carolina House of Representatives. He was Black and a "free-born Democrat". He signed the 1868 Constitution of South Carolina.

He represented Charleston. February 10, 1880 he resigned.

The South Carolina Historical Society has in their archives the "Simons, Siegling & Cappelmann records, 1857–1928" (box 13) which contains papers related to Elfe.
