= Senator Haynes =

Senator Haynes may refer to:

- Joe M. Haynes (1936–2018), Tennessee State Senate
- Landon Carter Haynes (1816–1875), Confederate States Senator from Tennessee from 1862 to 1865
- Ray Haynes (born 1954), California State Senate

== See also ==
- Senator Hayne (disambiguation)
