= Oscar Frank Thornton =

American politician from South Carolina (1905–1992)

Member of the South Carolina House of Representatives
- In office 1935–1936

38th Secretary of State of South Carolina
- In office 1950–1979
- Governor: Strom Thurmond; James F. Byrnes; George Bell Timmerman Jr. Fritz Hollings; Donald S. Russell; Robert Evander McNair; John C. West; James B. Edwards
- Preceded by: Peter Thomas Bradham
- Succeeded by: John Tucker Campbell

Personal details
- Born: July 26, 1905
- Died: January 12, 1992 (aged 86)
- Party: Democratic
- Education: University of South Carolina

Oscar Frank Thornton (July 26, 1905 – January 12, 1992), also known as O. Frank Thornton, was an American politician. He served as secretary of state of South Carolina from 1950 to 1979.

== Life and career ==
Thornton attended the University of South Carolina.

In 1935, Thornton was elected to the South Carolina House of Representatives, representing York County, South Carolina.

Thornton served as secretary of state of South Carolina from 1950 to 1979.

Thornton died on January 12, 1992, at the age of 86.

Party political offices
Preceded by William Plumer Blackwell	Democratic nominee for Secretary of State of South Carolina; 1950, 1954, 1958, 1962, 1966, 1970, 1974	Succeeded by John Tucker Campbell
