= John Tucker Campbell =

American politician

39th Secretary of State of South Carolina
- In office January 10, 1979 – January 9, 1991
- Governor: Richard Riley; Carroll A. Campbell, Jr.
- Preceded by: Oscar Frank Thornton
- Succeeded by: Jim Miles

66th Mayor of Columbia, South Carolina
- In office 1970–1978
- Preceded by: Lester Bates
- Succeeded by: Kirkman Finlay Jr.

Personal details
- Born: John Tucker Campbell; December 12, 1912 Calhoun Falls, South Carolina
- Died: August 26, 1991 (aged 78) Columbia, South Carolina
- Party: Democratic
- Spouse: Gertrude Davis
- Awards: Order of the Palmetto (1972)

Military service
- Allegiance: United States
- Branch/service: U.S. Army Air Forces
- Years of service: 1942–1946
- Battles/wars: World War II

John Tucker Campbell (December 12, 1912 – August 26, 1991) was an American businessman and politician who was Secretary of State of South Carolina. He was awarded the Order of the Palmetto 18 October 1972 by Governor John C. West.

He served in the U.S. Army Air Force 1942–1946 as an Air Transport Pilot in Europe and the South Pacific. He was mayor of Columbia, South Carolina 1970–1978. He was Secretary of State of South Carolina 1978–1991. He served as member of Columbia City Council two four year terms. He was past president of South Carolina Municipal Association and past member of the advisory board of National League of Cities, past member of its board of directors, Finance Committee, Transportation Committee and Steering Committee on Revenue sharing.

He was a member of American Legion, VFW, DAV and Jamil Temple Shrine, chairman of the Easter Seal Society Buck-A-Cup (BAC) for two years and past governor of South Carolina Optimist Clubs.

He was married to Gertrude Davis Campbell. He was the owner of Campbell Drug Stores for 41 years.

Party political offices
Preceded by Oscar Frank Thornton	Democratic nominee for Secretary of State of South Carolina; 1978, 1982, 1986, 1990	Succeeded by Milton Kimpson
