= Lucius Wimbush =

American legislator and businessman

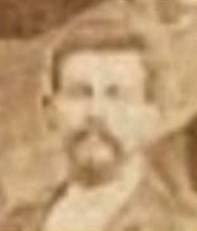
Lucius Wimbush

Lucius Wimbush (c. 1839 – 1872) was a state legislator, businessman, and public official. After being freed from slavery, he became a state senator during the Reconstruction Era in South Carolina. Wimbush was elected from Chester County and was secretary of the Chester Union League. He is buried in Randolph Cemetery where eight other Reconstruction era legislators were also interred.

Wimbush was born in South Carolina. He was a body servant for Matthew C. Butler at the University of South Carolina. He served in the South Carolina Senate from 1868 to 1872 when he died in office. He also served as a deputy marshal, commissioner of elections, and county agent for the state land commission. He was a director of the Enterprise Railroad and other businesses.

== See also ==
- African American officeholders from the end of the Civil War until before 1900
