= Charles D. Hayne =

American politician (1844–1913)

Member of the South Carolina Senate from the Barnwell County district
- In office 1872–1876

Member of the South Carolina State House of Representatives
- In office 1868-1872

Personal details
- Born: c. 1844 Charleston, South Carolina, US
- Died: 1913 (aged 68–69)
- Party: Republican

Charles D. Hayne (c. 1844–1913) was an American politician, tailor, and railroad investor from South Carolina. He served in the South Carolina House of Representatives from 1868 to 1872 and in the South Carolina Senate from 1872 to 1876. He also served as a warden in Aiken County, South Carolina and as a lieutenant colonel in the state militia. His brother James N. Hayne also held political office as did Henry E. Hayne.

Hayne was born in Charleston, South Carolina. He was the son of a white father and Isabella R., a free black mother. He was the nephew of powerful South Carolina politician Robert Y. Hayne. Educated in Charleston, he worked as a tailor during his early years.

After the civil war, Hayne was employed by the Freedmen's Bureau as a teacher and sent to Barnwell County, South Carolina. He was elected as a delegate to the South Carolina Constitutional Convention of 1868 and to the South Carolina House of Representatives in the same year. He was re-elected in 1870. In that year, he was part of the initial board of Enterprise Railroad, a black-owned railroad company. He also served on the board of directors of various other corporations.

While in office, it was alleged that he received a $200 bribe for his vote on railroad-related legislation. In 1871, he accepted a bribe from Henry G. Worthington Two years later, he was elected to the South Carolina Senate for a four-year term. He left politics with the end of Reconstruction in 1876.

"During the month of December, 1871, H.G. Worthington gave me the sum of $500 at the State House for voting against the resolution of impeachment. John J. Patterson, now United States Senator, first spoke to me about the matter and told me to see Worthington. I had a conversation with Worthington, and I said to him that I didn't see that Scott ought to be impeached, and yet there must be something in it, as the Committee who had been appointed to look into the matter reported that there were grounds for impeachment. Worthington said there was nothing in it, but that Bowen was urging it because he had a spite against Scott, and that he would give me $500 if I would vote against it. The next day after the vote, H.G. Worthington paid me the $500 over Fine's, up stairs. No one else was present when Worthington handed me the money. C.D. Hayne"

== See also ==
- African American officeholders from the end of the Civil War until before 1900
