= William McKinlay =

African-American politician

William McKinlay was a prosperous tailor and state legislator in Charleston, South Carolina.

== Early life ==
William J. McKinlay was born around 1835 in Charleston, South Carolina, into a family of free people of color. He also had Scottish ancestry.

== Career ==
He and his brothers Archibald and George owned a tailoring business. He and Archibald owned the McKinlay Building on Market Street and other properties. He was also a director of Enterprise Railroad.

He was elected a delegate to the 1868 South Carolina Constitutional Convention in Charleston. (Notably, during the convention McKinlay was even put forward as a candidate for a statewide office – he vied for the Republican nomination for Secretary of State, but ultimately withdrew in favor of Francis Lewis Cardozo, who won the post.) He was appointed to the Charleston City Council in 1868 (becoming became the first African-American Council Member to hold office in Charleston), then elected to the council in November of the same year. He was also elected to the council in 1873.

One of McKinlay's most notable appointments was as Register of Mesne Conveyance (RMC) for Charleston County—the official responsible for recording property transactions. He is believed to be the first African American in U.S. history to hold such a position overseeing a county’s property records, and his control over land records during Reconstruction symbolized a profound shift in power dynamics and was instrumental in legitimizing African American property ownership.

He was elected to serve in the state legislature during the 1868 term.

== Personal life ==
McKinlay was a member of the Brown Fellowship Society. He purchased slaves to allow them to live freely even as the law recognized them as his property. At one point the city posted the sale a girl that was his property to satisfy taxes owed. A response was soon after posted that she was free and would not be sold.

He was married to Sarah Jane McKinlay. He died intestate in 1872.
