= Secular Coalition for America =

American advocacy group

- Formation: 2002; 24 years ago
- Type: Non-profit organization
- Purpose: Advocate for the nontheistic community in the United States and for secularism.
- Location: Washington, D.C.
- Website: secular.org

The Secular Coalition for America is an advocacy group located in Washington D.C. It describes itself as "protecting the equal rights of nonreligious Americans."

The Secular Coalition is a group of diverse organizations representing atheists, agnostics, humanists, and other nonreligious Americans. The Secular Coalition for America is a dedicated lobbying organization within the Coalition, whose mission is to advocate for the equal rights of nonreligious Americans and defend the separation of religion and government.

Coalition president Herb Silverman was a leading force behind the founding of the organization. Between 2005 and 2009, it was directed by former Nevada state senator Lori Lipman Brown, who became its first full-time lobbyist in September 2005. Sean Faircloth, a five-term Maine state legislator, served as Executive Director between 2009 and 2011. Former White House staffer Edwina Rogers served as Executive Director from May 2012 to May 2014. The current Executive Director is Steven Emmert - (2022 - present).

The Secular Coalition works to increase visibility and respect for irreligious, nontheistic viewpoints in the United States and to protect and strengthen the secular character of the U.S. government. The Coalition advocates complete separation of church and state within American politics which they claim is clearly established in the U.S. Constitution under the First Amendment. Furthermore, the Coalition holds that freedom of conscience, which includes religious freedom, was of such importance that it was made the first of all freedoms protected in the Bill of Rights, and that reason and science should be guiding tenets for public policy.

== Mission ==
The mission of the Secular Coalition for America is to advocate for the equal rights of nonreligious Americans and defend the separation of religion and government.

== History ==
The Secular Coalition for America was founded in 2002 by four U.S. secular organizations: Atheist Alliance International, the Institute for Humanist Studies, the Secular Student Alliance, and the Secular Web. In 2005 the American Humanist Association became the Coalition's fifth member organization. The Society for Humanistic Judaism and the Freedom From Religion Foundation joined the Coalition in January 2006, the Military Association of Atheists and Freethinkers in February 2007, and the American Ethical Union in April 2008. In 2009, Camp Quest joined in January and American Atheists became a member in June. The Council for Secular Humanism joined in January 2010.

Coalition president Herb Silverman was a leading force behind the founding of the organization, which was designed as a framework for cooperation among secular groups in the United States. Silverman believed that nontheistic Americans could gradually gain the respect of politicians and society if they collaborated on issues and presented a unified force for activism. Silverman had been raised Jewish but joined a Unitarian Church in adulthood.

The Coalition's member organizations, as of 2026, are:

- American Atheists
- American Ethical Union
- American Humanist Association
- Association of Secular Elected Officials
- Atheists United
- Black Nonbelievers, Inc.
- Camp Quest
- Center for Inquiry (parent organization of the Council for Secular Humanism)
- The Clergy Project
- Congress of Secular Jewish Organizations
- Ex-Muslims of North America
- Freedom From Religion Foundation
- Freethought Society
- Hispanic American Freethinkers
- Humanist Mutual Aid Network
- Institute for Humanist Studies
- Recovering From Religion
- Richard Dawkins Foundation for Reason and Science
- Secular Student Alliance
- Secular Woman
- Society for Humanistic Judaism
- Unitarian Universalist Humanist Association

== Board of directors ==
The Secular Coalition for America Board of Directors is democratically structured. Directors are nominated and voted on to serve by the member organizations. Officers may be associated with member organizations or may come from the wider freethought community. In August 2022, Steven Emmert became the Executive Director. Scott MacConomy is the Director of Policy and Government Affairs. Current board members are Claudette St Pierre, President; Anthony Cruz Pantojas, Vice President; Dana Morganroth, Treasurer; David Breeden, Secretary; Herb Silverman; Wil Jeudy, MD; Neil Polzin; Rebecca Hale; and AJ Goodman.

== Legislative focus ==
The Secular Coalition for America advocates for religious freedom, as guaranteed by the First Amendment of the U.S. Constitution, and works to defend the equal rights of nonreligious Americans. Representing 20 national secular organizations, hundreds of local secular communities, and working with our allies in the faith community, we combine the power of grassroots activism with professional lobbying to make an impact on the laws and policies that govern separation of religion and government — or the improper encroachment of either on the other.

The SCA's professional governmental affairs team located in Washington D.C. works to educate Members of Congress, Congressional staff, the White House and its Administration on the issues impacting religious freedom and nontheistic Americans. By serving as a resource on the key issues that impact our mission, SCA ensures that lawmakers are informed about how their votes and policies will support, or undermine, the separation of church and state and the lives of nontheists and religious minorities. The governmental affairs team works with the Congressional Freethought Caucus and Capitol Hill champions to advocate for the passing of legislation that supports a secular government and raises the profile of secular Americans and secular values in Washington.

The Coalition also welcomes and works in cooperation with religious groups regardless of affiliation when the religious group(s) share their beliefs of freedom of conscience and separation of church and state. The Secular Coalition for America espouses religious tolerance to people of all religions and those without.

== Congressional Reason Reception ==
Alongside the Freedom from Religion Foundation and the American Humanist Association, the Secular Coalition for America has co-hosted the Congressional Reason Reception in Washington, D.C., annually since 2024. The event brings together members of Congress, congressional staff, advocates, and leaders from secular and humanist organizations to recognize the role of reason and science in public policy.

Reason Reception organizers present multiple awards invoking the legacy of Thomas Paine. The reception has featured remarks from members of the Congressional Freethought Caucus, including co-chairs Jared Huffman and Jamie Raskin, as well as keynote addresses from prominent figures, including Susan Wild in 2025 and Mary L. Trump in 2026. The reception has become a recurring opportunity for the congressional secular community to meet advocates for freedom of conscience and the constitutional separation of religion and government.

== Elected official contest ==
In 2007 the Secular Coalition for America pledged a $1,000 reward to the person identifying the highest level elected official to openly acknowledge no supernatural beliefs. The "Find an Atheist, Humanist, Freethinker Elected Official Contest" concluded with the announcement that Rep. Pete Stark (D-Calif.), a member of the United States Congress since 1973, held the highest office of four public servants to acknowledge a secular world view to the Coalition after being nominated by a contestant. Stark was the first Congressional member to publicly self-identify with the freethought community.

== Administration briefing ==
On February 26, 2010, the Secular Coalition for America, along with a unified delegation of members of the secular movement from across the country, met with representatives of the Obama administration for an official policy briefing—the first of its kind specifically for American non-theists. The group raised three particular areas of concern to secular Americans: military proselytizing and religious coercion, fixing the Faith-Based Initiatives program, and ending the exemptions granted to religious groups in laws governing child medical abuse and neglect.

== Congressional scorecard ==
The Secular Coalition for America published an online Congressional scorecard rating U.S. Representatives and Senators on their roll call votes and legislative sponsorship.
