= Robert Moorman Sims =

American politician (1836–1898)

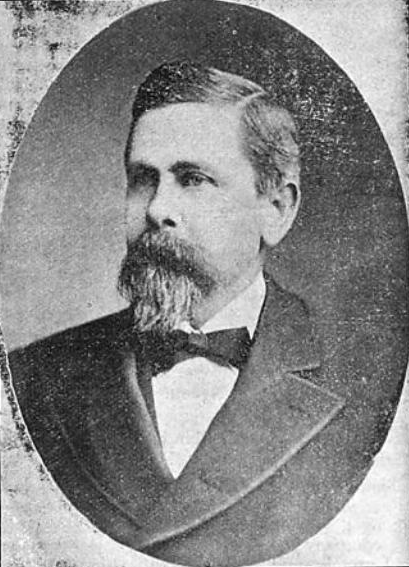

Robert Moorman Sims (December 8, 1836 - December 9, 1898) was an officer in the Confederate army during the American Civil War; a planter, state legislator in South Carolina as well as the South Carolina Secretary of State. He served as the principal of Rock Hill Mape Academy. He was a Democrat.

Born and raised in Lancaster County, South Carolina, Sims graduated from the South Carolina Military Academy in 1856. He worked for the South Carolina Secretary of State from 1876 to 1880, and served as president of the South Carolina Horticultural Society.

He represented Lancaster County in the South Carolina Senate from 1868-1870. He served as state secretary of state from 1876 to 1880, succeeding Republican Henry E. Hayne. A historical marker commemorates his Rock Hill homesite.

He married twice and had several children.
