= Henry E. Hayne =

American politician (1840–d.n.d.)

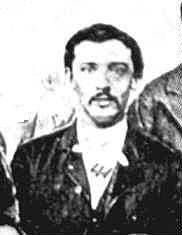

Secretary of State of South Carolina
- In office 1872–1877
- Governor: Robert K. Scott; Franklin J. Moses Jr. Daniel H. Chamberlain
- Preceded by: Francis Lewis Cardozo
- Succeeded by: Robert Moorman Sims

Personal details
- Born: December 30, 1840 Charleston, South Carolina, US
- Died: Unknown
- Party: Republican
- Education: University of South Carolina
- Profession: Politician

Military service
- Allegiance: United States
- Branch/service: Union Army
- Years of service: 1862–1866
- Rank: Commissary Sergeant
- Unit: 33rd United States Colored Infantry Regiment

Henry E. Hayne (December 30, 1840 – d.n.d.) was a politician in South Carolina during the Reconstruction era. Born free in Charleson, South Carolina, he served in the South Carolina Senate and as Secretary of State of South Carolina in the 1870s. In 1873, he became the first student of color at the University of South Carolina medical school. A Republican, he was a delegate to the 1868 South Carolina Constitutional Convention.

== Early life ==
Henry E. Hayne was born free in Charleston, South Carolina. His mixed-race mother, Mary, was a free Black woman; his father, James Hayne, was a wealthy white Charlestonian. He was the nephew of Robert Y. Hayne, a former U.S. senator and governor of South Carolina. His father acknowledged him and arranged for him to receive some education. Hayne grew up in Charleston and worked as a tailor.

== Military service during the Civil War ==
When the Civil War broke out, Hayne volunteered for the Confederate Army, but intended to flee across Union lines at a later time. In July 1862, he crossed into Union-occupied Beaufort, South Carolina, and enlisted in the 33rd United States Colored Infantry Regiment (formerly known as the First South Carolina Volunteers). Hayne enlisted as a private but was later promoted to Commissary Sergeant in 1863.

== Reconstruction era and political career ==
Leaving the Army in early 1866, Hayne became principal of Madison Colored School run by the Freedmen's Bureau in Marion County, South Carolina. During Reconstruction, he became active in the Republican Party, which had supported citizenship and suffrage for freedmen. He served on the Republican state executive committee in 1867 and was a delegate to the 1868 South Carolina Constitutional Convention. He served as a sub-commissioner for the South Carolina Land Commission from 1869 to 1871. He chaired the Marion County Republican Party in 1870 and served as vice president of the state Union League.

Hayne was elected in 1870 to represent Marion County in the South Carolina Senate. He was next elected as Secretary of State of South Carolina, serving from 1872 to 1877. He succeeded fellow Black Republican Francis Lewis Cardozo. He campaigned for re-election in 1876 but faced ouster by Democratic nominee Robert Moorman Sims, a Confederate Army veteran. Hayne resigned from office in May 1877.

The legislature had passed a new constitution in 1868 making public facilities available to all students, and while serving as secretary of state on October 7, 1873, Hayne enrolled in the medical school of the University of South Carolina, becoming the university's first student of color. The event made national news and was covered by The New York Times, which described Hayne "as white as any of his ancestors". Many faculty and students resigned in protest, and by 1875, Black men comprised the majority of the student body.

After Democrats regained control of the state legislature and governor's office in the election of 1876, they closed the college by legislative fiat in early 1877. The Assembly passed a law prohibiting blacks from admission to the college, and authorized Claflin College in Orangeburg as the only institution for higher education for African Americans in the state. Hayne left the University of South Carolina before completing his degree.

== Personal life ==
Little is known about Hayne’s personal life. He married Anna M on April 29, 1874. Sometime before August 1877, Hayne left South Carolina. In January 1885 he was living in Cook County, Illinois, with his wife. His later whereabouts and final resting place are not definitely known. However, the Office of the Illinois Secretary of State’s Statewide Death Index records a date of death for a Henry Hayne on January 18, 1898, in Chicago, at the age of 56.

His brothers Charles D. Hayne and James N. Hayne also held public office.

He was honored at the University of South Carolina on the 150th anniversary of his enrollment when October 7, 2023 was proclaimed Henry Hayne Day.

== See also ==
- African American officeholders from the end of the Civil War until before 1900
