= Thaddeus Sasportas =

American politician

Thaddeus Kenlock Sasportas was a state legislator in South Carolina during the Reconstruction era. He represented Chester County, South Carolina in the South Carolina House of Representatives. A document describes him as a slave before the American Civil War, as being a Baptist minister, and as Black.

Born in Charleston, he was educated in Philadelphia. He served as Orangeburg County treasurer.

In 1876, he proposed splitting the millage funding schools evenly between white and "colored" schools as a compromise agreement. A newspaper notice of the offer noted that the preponderance of students were African American. He was declared bankrupt and his property and cotton gin were put up for auction in 1879.
