= John B. Wright =

American 19th century politician

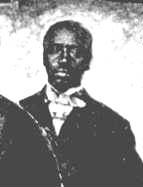

South Carolina House of Representatives
- In office 1868–1872

John B. Wright was a tailor and legislator in South Carolina during the Reconstruction era. He served in the South Carolina House of Representatives from 1868 until 1872 representing Charleston. Researchers documented him as being Black, free before the Civil War, and literate. He was a president of the Colored Young Men's Christian Association. His photograph was included in a montage of Radical Republican South Carolina legislators.
