= Jim Miles (politician) =

American politician

40th Secretary of State of South Carolina
- In office January 9, 1991 – January 1, 2003
- Governor: Carroll A. Campbell Jr. (1991–1995); David Beasley (1995–1999); Jim Hodges (1999–2003)
- Preceded by: John Tucker Campbell
- Succeeded by: Mark Hammond

Greenville, South Carolina City Council
- In office 1989–1991

Personal details
- Born: James Melvin Miles; October 10, 1941 (age 84) Norfolk, Virginia
- Party: Republican
- Education: Duke University (B.A.); University of North Carolina School of Law (J.D.)
- Occupation: Attorney

James Melvin Miles (born October 10, 1941) is an American politician and attorney who served as secretary of state of South Carolina from 1991 to 2003 and subsequently as chief of staff to the lieutenant governor of South Carolina Andre Bauer.

Born in Norfolk, Virginia, Miles received a B.A. from Duke University in 1964 and J.D. from the University of North Carolina School of Law in 1969. Miles was admitted to the North Carolina Bar in 1969 and the South Carolina Bar in 1971. He was an attorney in private practice in Greenville, South Carolina, and was elected to the Greenville City Council in 1989. In 1990, Miles was elected as the first Republican secretary of state in South Carolina since Reconstruction.

Miles attempted to abolish the secretary of state office and vowed to investigate charity fraud in South Carolina. In 1994, South Carolina passed a law cracking down on charity fraud.

In July 2020, Miles was appointed as acting CEO of Open Technology Fund in the U.S. Agency for Global Media despite having no technological expertise or experience in internet freedom issues.

Party political offices
Preceded by Rudy Barnes, Jr.	Republican nominee for Secretary of State of South Carolina; 1990, 1994, 1998	Succeeded by Mark Hammond
