= South Carolina Department of Alcohol and Other Drug Abuse Services =

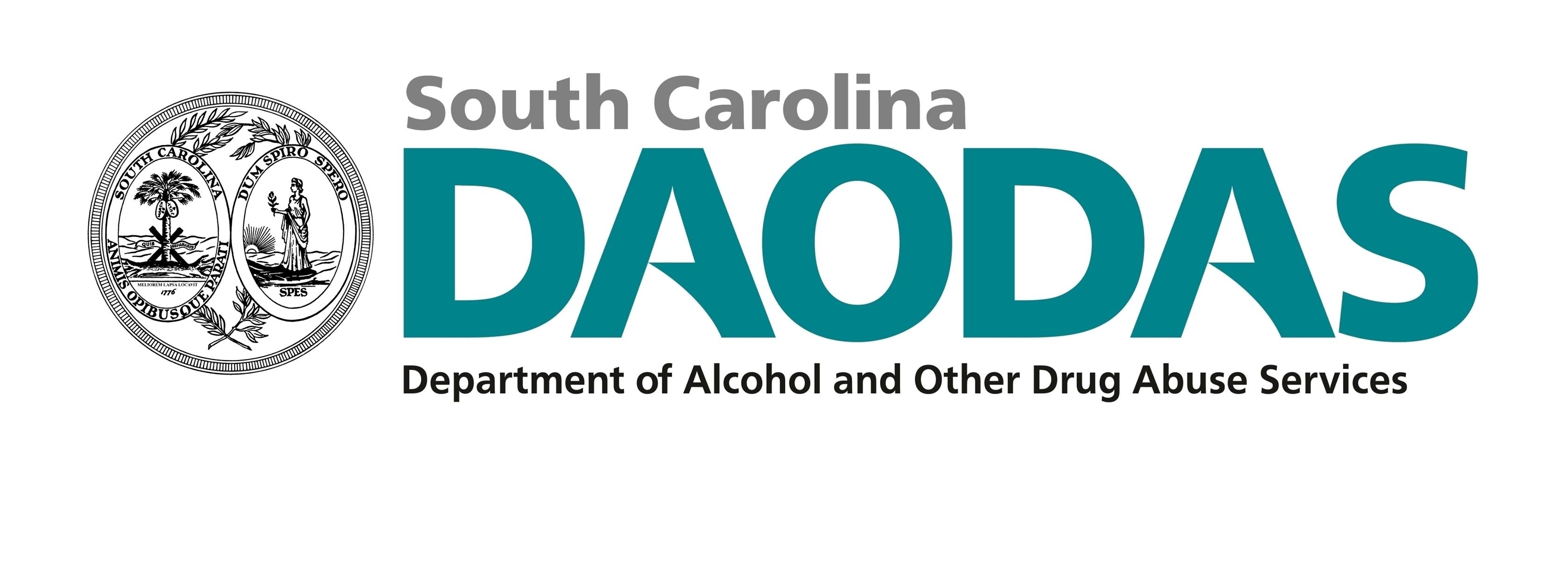
- Abbreviation: DAODAS

Agency overview
- Formed: 1957

Jurisdictional structure
- Operations jurisdiction: South Carolina, USA

Operational structure
- Headquarters: 1801 Main Street, 12th Floor, Columbia, South Carolina
- Agency executive: Sara Goldsby, Director

Website
- DAODAS Website

The South Carolina Department of Department of Alcohol and Other Drug Abuse Services (DAODAS) is a state agency in the state of South Carolina in the US. The agency was formed in 1957 as the South Carolina Alcoholic Rehabilitation Center when the state General Assembly passed Act 309. Later, the agency's mission was broadened to include other substances. The department contracts with the state’s county alcohol and drug abuse authorities to provide the majority of direct prevention, treatment and recovery services. DAODAS is composed of five divisions: Prevention and Intervention Services; Treatment and Recovery Services; Technology, Research and Evaluation; Legal and Compliance; and Finance and Operations.

DAODAS is a cabinet-level agency, with its Director appointed by the Governor. The current Director is Sara Goldsby. The department coordinates with state universities and the stakeholders to fight addiction and has also leveraged technology in prisons to improve mental health outcomes.
