= Constitution of South Carolina =

American state constitution

The Constitution of the State of South Carolina is the governing document of the U.S. state of South Carolina. It describes the structure and function of the state's government. The current constitution took effect on December 4, 1895. South Carolina has had six other constitutions, which were adopted in 1669, 1776, 1778, 1790, 1865 and 1868.

== Constitutional history ==
=== Fundamental Constitutions ===
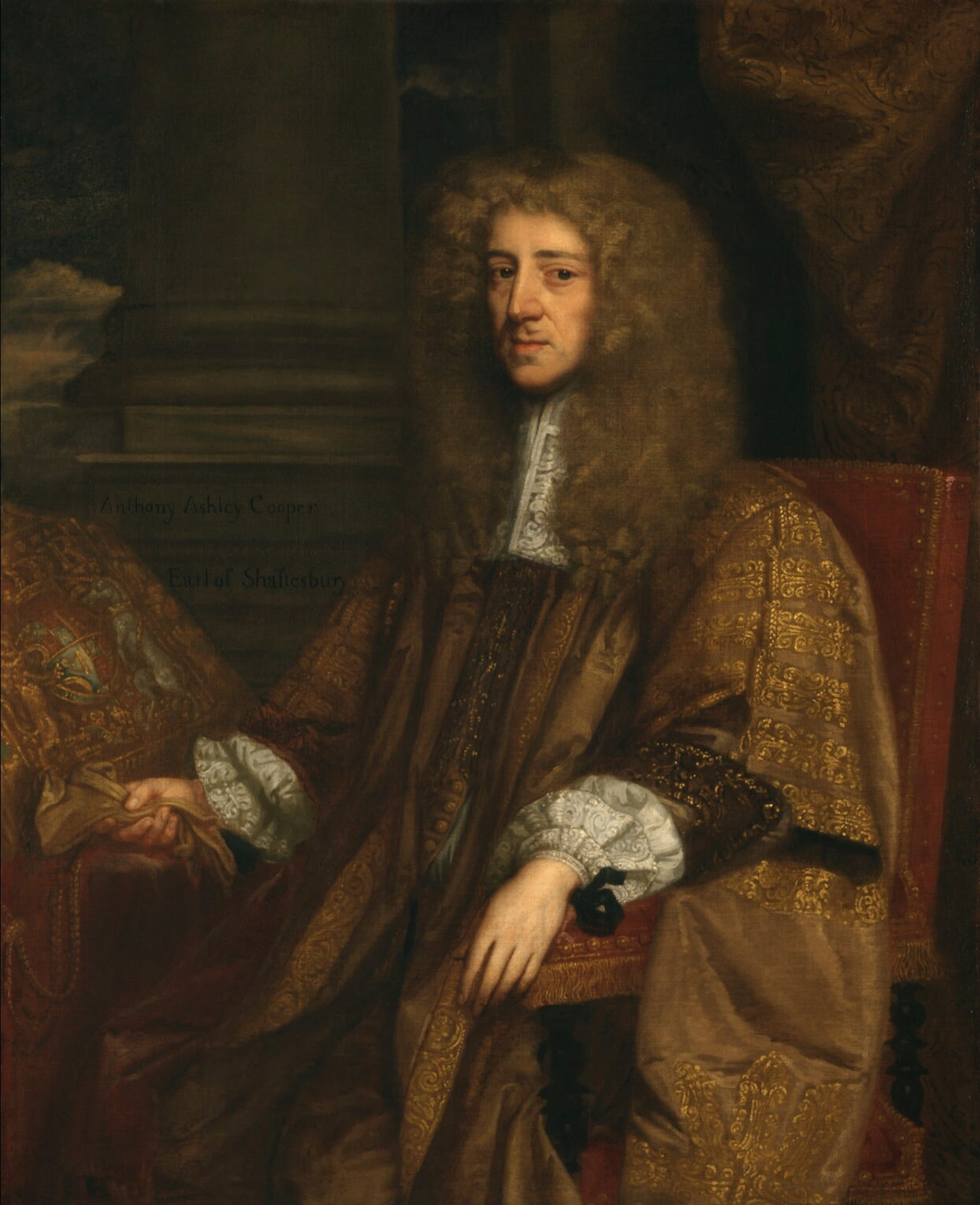
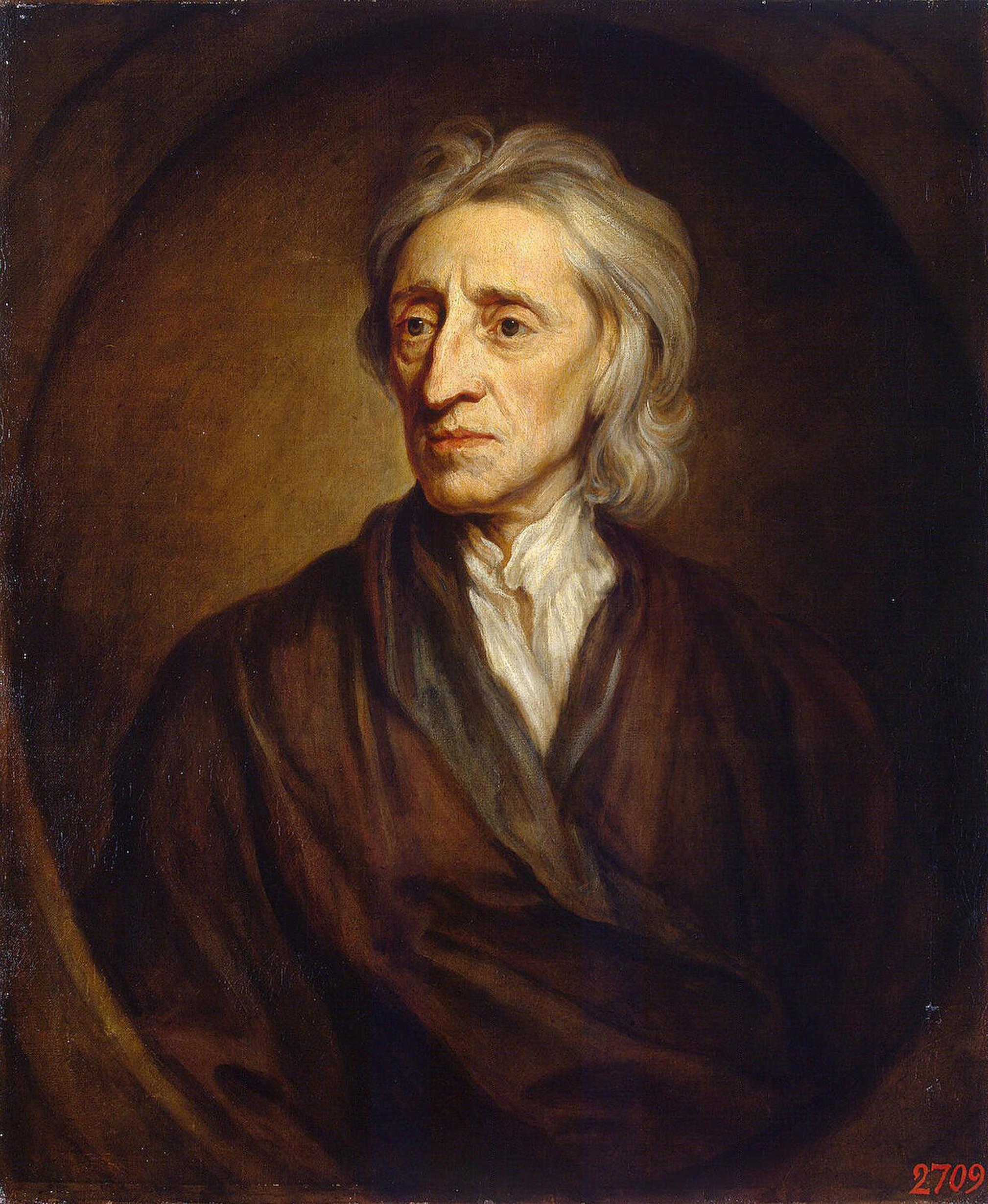
Anthony Ashley-Cooper, 1st Earl of Shaftesbury and John Locke, the writers of the Fundamental Constitutions

The first governmental framework for what is now the State of South Carolina was the Fundamental Constitutions of Carolina, written in 1669 by the lead colonial proprietor Anthony Ashley Cooper, 1st Earl of Shaftesbury and his secretary John Locke. Influenced by philosophers such as James Harrington, the two men wrote a document which espoused religious toleration (except for Catholics) and establishing a system of government based on ownership of land. The document placed the eight proprietors of the colony at the head of its government, along with a bicameral parliament. The parliament consisted of the proprietors' deputies and the elected Commons House of Assembly. To vote, a man needed fifty acres of land and needed five hundred acres to serve in the Assembly. Additionally, a three-tiered system of nobility was established: barons received 12,000 acres, while those with 24,000 acres became cassiques and those with 48,000 acres became landgraves. Despite the proprietors' wishes, the colonists refused to ratify the document. As a result, the proprietors retained governmental authority over the colony, but they implemented many of the document's provisions despite its non-ratification. In 1729, the British royal government assumed control of the colony, de facto abrogating the Fundamental Constitutions.

=== Constitution of 1776 ===
In September 1775, royal governor William Campbell fled the colony. The revolutionary Provincial Council quickly drafted a new constitution, which was adopted in March 1776. The preamble of the new constitution listed out several acts by the British considered tyrannical by the colonists in a manner similar to the later Declaration of Independence. The document, designed to be temporary, created a bicameral legislature, with the lower house (General Assembly) electing the upper house (Legislative Council) from out of its own number. The two chambers jointly elected the president and vice president, and each chamber selected three members of the privy council. The legislature also jointly elected judges, sheriffs, and military officers. Despite this republican system, the document retained the preexisting imbalance for legislative apportionment between the Lowcountry and the Upstate.

=== Constitution of 1778 ===
Two years later, the temporary constitution was replaced by a document which was supposed to be permanent. Written in 1777, the legislature adopted it in March 1778 following consultation with South Carolinians. The new document formally recognized South Carolina's independence from the British. The legislature, whose chambers were renamed the Senate and House of Representatives, retained the power to elect the executive, now called the Governor, along with the Lieutenant Governor and privy council. The executive's power was substantially diminished.

Religion played a much larger role in the 1778 constitution than in the 1776 one. After a significant debate in the legislature, the support of Christopher Gadsden and Charles Cotesworth Pinckney swayed the members of the body to vote to unanimously disestablish the Church of England in South Carolina as it existed at the time. Even so, a form of religious establishment was created, with all of the preexisting Protestant congregations being amalgamated into a single denomination but denied financial support. Additionally, ministers were forbidden from serving in public office, though the constitution asserted that doing so prevented them from being "diverted from the great duties of their function."

=== Constitution of 1790 ===
South Carolina held a constitutional convention in 1790. The adoption of the Constitution of the United States in 1787 prompted South Carolinians to revise their constitution yet again. Once again, the Lowcountry benefited from imbalanced legislative apportionment, though the state capital was moved to Columbia as a token concession. Provisions also included requiring the ownership of land and slaves to hold public office, and separation of church and state was formally achieved. Similar land ownership requirements limited suffrage in the state, while the legislature retained the power to elect the state's governor, whose enumerated powers mirrored those of the President of the United States under the new federal constitution.

Due to the maintenance of the imbalanced apportionment scheme, many Upstate residents proved dissatisfied with the constitution. In 1794, a number of prominent Upstate residents, including Wade Hampton I and John Kershaw, formed the Representative Reform Association to challenge the system. Initially, the Lowcountry-dominated legislature rejected their appeals. However, the Upcountry residents, aligned with the newly ascendant Democratic-Republican Party, eventually prevailed. In 1808, the constitution was amended to create an apportionment system based on the total white population, substantially alleviating many of the issues. Further amendments to the constitution were later adopted. Most significantly, in 1810, an amendment granted the suffrage to all white men over the age of twenty-one.

Scholar C. Blease Graham argues that, due to South Carolina's secession in 1861, a new constitution should be considered as having been adopted at that time. However, no actual new document was ratified at that date, and the 1790 constitution merely continued to have effect as amended. South Carolina held a constitutional convention in 1861.

=== Constitution of 1865 ===
South Carolina held a constitutional convention in 1865. A new constitution was adopted in 1865 following the end of the Civil War. The new constitution recognized the abolition of slavery and also further equalized legislative representation. Direct elections for the governor were implemented, and the governor received the power of the veto. This equalization of legislative representation recognized only the white population, however, and only white men could be elected to the legislature. The new constitution also included a bill of rights, which prior constitutions omitted.

=== Constitution of 1868 ===
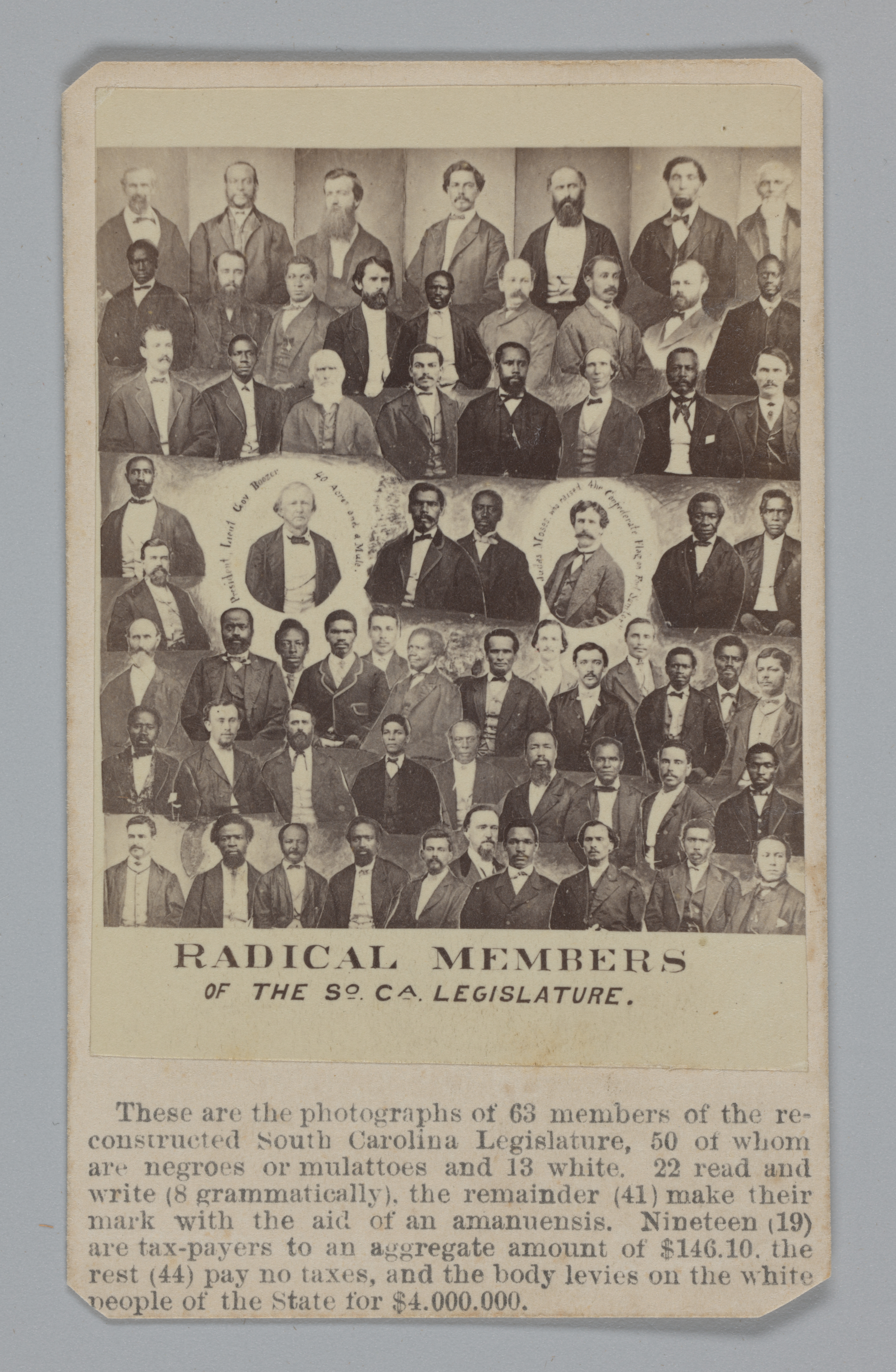
Radical Republicans in South Carolina's new 1868 government

In 1867, Radical Republicans took control of the U.S. Congress and ended the period known as Presidential Reconstruction. Under the Reconstruction Acts, the former Confederate states were required to adopt new constitutions and ratify the Fourteenth Amendment. As a result, South Carolina was bidden to call forth a constitutional convention to adopt a new framework of government.

A constitutional convention met in Charleston, January 14, 1868. For the first time, black men participated in the election of delegates to the convention. It is the only constitution in the history of the state submitted directly to the electorate for approval; many whites refused to participate. The United States Congress ratified it on April 16, 1868.

South Carolina was the only state where a majority of the delegates to its constitutional convention were black.

The constitution ignored wealth and based representation in the House strictly on population. It abolished debtors' prison, created counties, gave some rights to women, and provided for public education. The popularly-elected governor could veto and a 2/3 vote of the General Assembly was required to override. Race was abolished as a condition for suffrage. Black codes were overturned, there was no prohibition on interracial marriage, and all public schools were open to all races. It provided a uniform system of free public schools, "although not implemented until decades later."

=== Violent overthrow of 1876 and 1877 ===
Despite the provisions of the 1868 state constitution, in 1876, whites regained control of the state government. Known as Redeemers or Bourbon Democrats, these men consisted of the former plantation elite and set about undermining the Reconstruction-era document. Violent intimidation was used to prevent African Americans from voting, and, in the early 1890s, the Eight Box Law (which instituted an indirect literacy requirement for voting) aimed at disenfranchising African-American and poor white voters.

=== Constitution of 1895 ===
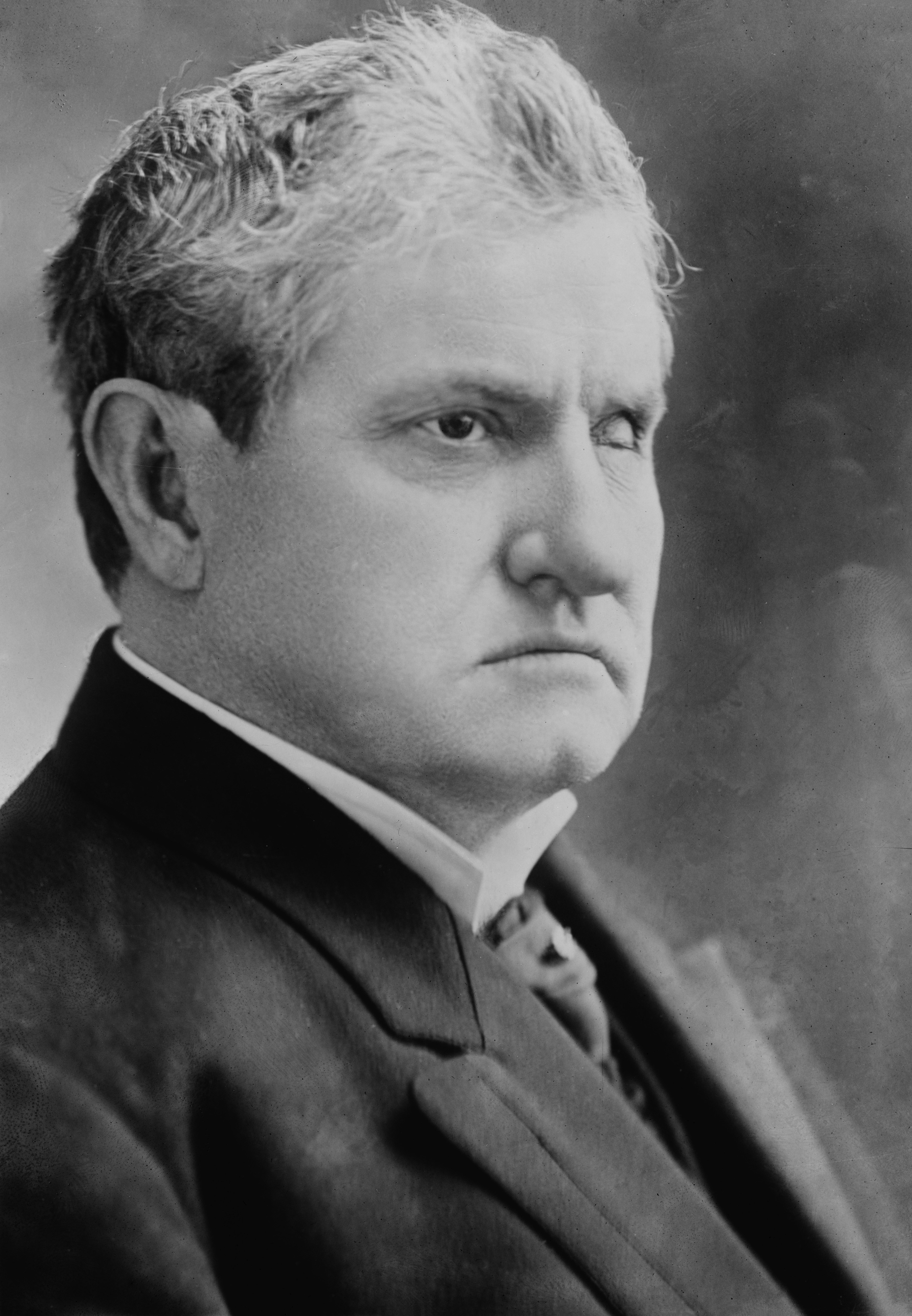
Senator Benjamin Tillman, a proponent of the 1895 Constitution

Despite the suppression of African American voting rights, many whites still feared African Americans' political power. As a result, in 1894, Governor John Gary Evans, and his mentor, Senator Benjamin Tillman, called for a new constitutional convention to be held in the state. Tillman's base in the Upstate strongly supported the convention, but his Lowcountry rivals resisted. Thus, the convention was only approved by a narrow margin. (Tillman's movement emerged as a reaction to dominance by the Lowcountry elites and their affluent "Bourbon" allies).

Before the 1895 Constitution, voter registration limits were lower; voting was open to all males of 21 years. In the 1895 Constitution, the focus of voter registration became one of "intelligence" instead of "personhood." Individuals would, until January 1, 1898, have to be able to answer questions about any constitutional provision asked in order to qualify as a voter. Thereafter, the registration process included a test of reading and writing; individuals with at least $20 in property were also permitted to vote. The change from the 1868 constitution's "personhood" to the 1895 constitution's "intelligence" was due to the 1895 constitution's framers' desire to disenfranchise African Americans in order to bar them from participation in the political process. Of course, due to variations in the quality of education, many poor whites were also victims of this new law. According to the state's Democratic Party-leaning newspapers, the motivations behind changing the constitution were clear:

We can trust white men to do right by the inferior race, but we cannot trust the inferior race with power over the white man.

— Charleston News and Courier

Women's suffrage advocates also lobbied the convention to grant them the right to vote. The convention rejected the plea but did grant women property rights. Tillman, however, suffered a minor defeat on women's issues when the convention rejected his proposal to legalize divorce. Divorce had been legal under the 1868 Constitution until 1878, when the Redeemer government repealed the state's divorce laws.

In addition to voting rights and women's rights, several other issues were raised. Due to concerns about overreaches by local governments under the 1868 Constitution, the new constitution substantially limited home rule and required the creation of special-purpose districts for many services. Each county's legislative delegation also acted as its local government, approving the county budget, and the succeeding years saw the creation of multiple new counties, in order to further decrease the power of the Lowcountry. The new document also provided funding for primary education and established a system of liquor control in the state, known as the Dispensary.

==== Amendments prior to 1968 ====
Between 1895 and 1968, the 1895 Constitution was amended 330 times, making it one of the longest state constitutions in the United States. It had become a somewhat chaotic document, in large part because most of the amendments dealt with matters addressed by statute in most other states. The great majority of these amendments dealt with bonded debt limits for local governments. Originally, changes in the bonded debt limits for counties could only be adopted by a statewide vote. Several attempts were also made to alter the state's divorce law. Those attempts finally succeeded in 1947 when state legislators proposed a constitutional amendment to permit divorce. Following voter approval in 1948, the state legislature ratified the amendment, which took effect in April 1949.

==== Revisions since 1968 ====
In 1966, the General Assembly approved a committee to study constitutional reform, which published its report in 1969. The report proposed seventeen new articles to replace those in the old constitution, of which the voters ratified twelve. Most significant included changes to the judiciary, which took until 1984 to fully implement. Additionally, in 1973, an amendment authorized home rule for counties. Later, in 1981, the governor's term was extended to four years with reelection permitted.

In 1991, Governor Carroll A. Campbell Jr. authorized a new commission to study reform of the executive branch of government. Its report, Modernizing South Carolina State Government for the Twenty-First Century, recommended the reduction of the state's 145 agencies into fifteen cabinet departments via constitutional amendment. The legislature rejected its proposal, however, and instead statutorily implemented a reorganization of 76 agencies into thirteen departments.

== Overview of constitutional provisions ==
=== Preamble ===
The preamble introduces the purpose of the constitution and also establishes the principle of popular sovereignty. When adopted in 1895, "the people" was envisioned not as the whole of South Carolina's population but of the white male elites who had the suffrage at the time.

We, the people of the State of South Carolina, in Convention assembled, grateful to God for our liberties, do ordain and establish this Constitution for the preservation and perpetuation of the same.

— Constitution of South Carolina, preamble

=== Article I ===
Article I contains a bill of rights for the people of South Carolina. Many of the rights mirror those found in the federal Bill of Rights, including freedom of speech, religion, and protection from double jeopardy. Other provisions also mirror protections granted in other parts of the federal constitution, including a prohibition on ex post facto laws, and an equal protection clause mirroring that of the 14th Amendment. Some provisions, however, are not found in the federal constitution. These include a prohibition on debtors' prisons and a section regulating who is considered a resident of South Carolina.

Most of Article I dates from 1895 but was reorganized in 1971. Portions of the original Article I were also moved to separate articles at that time. Two amendments have been made to the Article since then, however. The first codifies a victims' rights bill, while the second creates a "right to hunt, fish, and harvest wildlife traditionally pursued." The latter was part of a wave of similar state constitutional amendments promoted by the gun-rights lobby National Rifle Association of America.

=== Article II ===
Article II governs the state's electoral process. Like Article I, much of the article is original but was reorganized in 1971. While section six of the article still permits the General Assembly to allow for literacy tests in order for one to vote, this provision was outlawed by the Voting Rights Act of 1965, and this was subsequently upheld by the U.S. Supreme Court in South Carolina v. Katzenbach.

A 2011 amendment also mandates the secret ballot for labor union elections, one of four such state constitutions to do so.

=== Article III ===
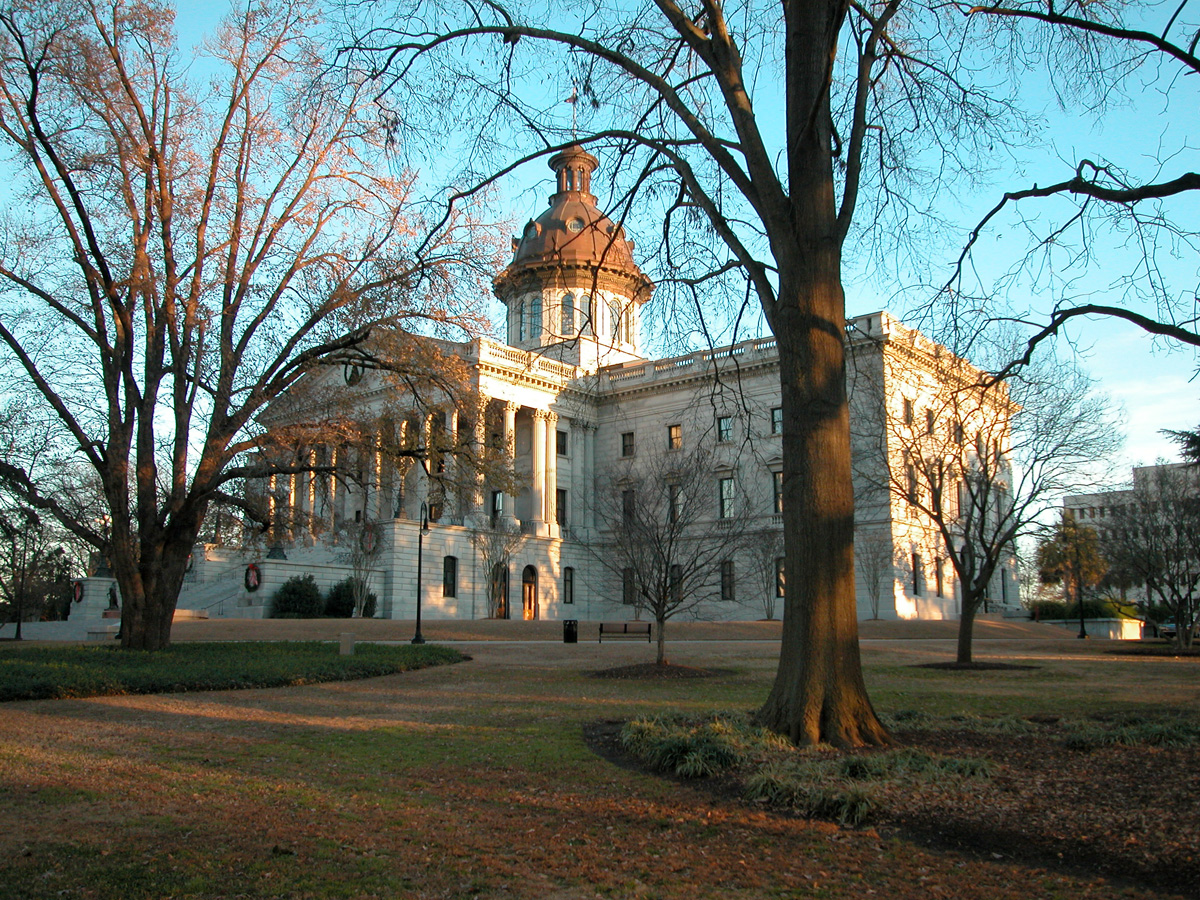
Article III establishes Columbia as the state capital.

Article III establishes the South Carolina General Assembly, the state's bicameral legislature. Initially, apportionment was county-based, with each county having one state senator (for a total of 46) and at least one state representative (46 out of 124). The U.S. Supreme Court decision in Reynolds v. Sims overruled these provisions, requiring state legislative districts to be equal in population. The number of legislators in each chamber has been retained, however.

Most of the article is original to the document and did not undergo reorganization in 1971. Some amendments have been made since then, however. For example, in 1997, voters approved a prohibition on convicted felons serving in the legislature in response to Operation Lost Trust. A year later, voters removed a provision outlawing interracial marriage, already overruled by the U.S. Supreme Court in Loving v. Virginia. Initially, a provision designating the age of consent as fourteen remained in place, but this provision was repealed in 2010.

=== Article IV ===
Article IV deals with the executive branch of the state's government. The constitution creates two positions within the executive branch, the Governor and the Lieutenant Governor. Prior to 1981, the Governor was limited to a single term in office, but an amendment permitted governors elected after 1981 to serve for two terms. The original text of Article IV designated the Lieutenant Governor as the presiding officer of the State Senate, as is the case in many states. A 2012 amendment, however, removed this power from the Lieutenant Governor, replacing it with a separate officer elected by the Senate. The amendment also created a "ticket" system whereby candidates for Governor and Lieutenant Governor ran together rather than separately as before.

Article IV, Section 2, regarding the qualifications of the governor, states: "No person shall be eligible to the office of Governor who denies the existence of the Supreme Being." Article VI, section 2 and Article XVII, section 4, both of which deal with the qualifications for state office, state: "No person who denies the existence of a Supreme Being shall hold any office under this Constitution." These provisions have never been enforced in modern times, since current precedent holds that the First Amendment's Establishment Clause is binding on the states per the Fourteenth Amendment's Due Process Clause. The state supreme court underlined this in Silverman v. Campbell, a 1997 case which held that these provisions not only violated the Establishment Clause, but also the No Religious Test Clause in Article VI of the United States Constitution.

=== Article V ===
Article V details the state's judiciary. South Carolina's judiciary consists of three tiers: a Supreme Court, a Court of Appeals, and Circuit Courts. All judges are elected by the legislature. The article also establishes the office of Attorney General. The Court of Appeals is not original to the constitution but was created by statute in 1983. Two years later, the constitution was amended to include the court. In addition to the three levels created constitutionally, a number of other courts have been created by statute. Additionally, the legislature statutorily designates the number of circuits, along with the number of judges assigned to each circuit. At present, there are sixteen circuits, with between 1-4 judges assigned to each.

=== Article VI ===
Article VI deals with various officers within the state government, in both the executive and legislative branches. Specific offices created by the article include the Secretary of State, Commissioner of Agriculture, and Comptroller General. All of these offices are elected. This article is not original to the constitution but was first passed in 1972. Originally, the article also provided for an elected Adjutant General to head the South Carolina National Guard. In 2014, however, the constitution was amended to make this office an appointed position by the Governor, requisite to confirmation by the Senate.

=== Article VII ===
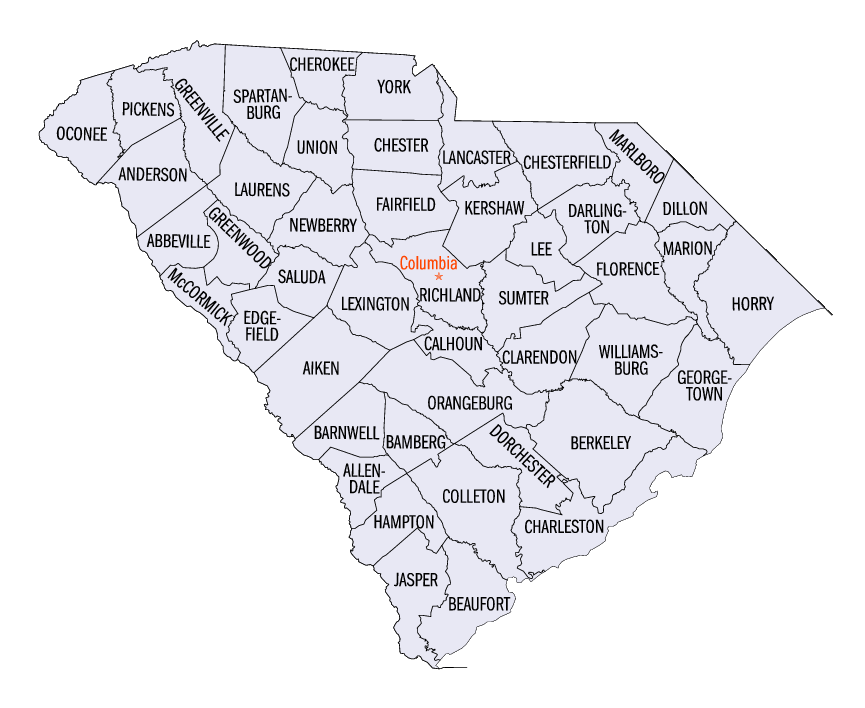
Map of the counties of South Carolina

Article VII regulates the creation of counties. Along with counties, Article VII also provides for a township form of government. Currently, however, no townships exist in South Carolina. When originally adopted, South Carolina contained thirty-six counties, as the 1895 convention created Saluda County out of Edgefield County. Since its adoption, ten new counties have been created, for a present total of forty-six. The only substantial amendment to this article occurred in 1970, with the insertion of a section authorizing the creation of regional councils of government.

=== Article VIII ===
Article VIII contains other provisions dealing with county governments and also contains information regarding municipal governments. The original version of Article VIII constrained the powers of local government, but an amended version adopted in 1973 allows for broader home rule. Before the amendment, the article had been amended approximately fifty times in order to increase the powers of nearly every local government in the state, generally regarding debts. The article authorizes consolidated city-counties, but no such jurisdiction exists currently in South Carolina.

==== Article VIII-A ====
This article gives the General Assembly the power to regulate alcohol sales in the state. Before being amended in 2005, only the sale of "minibottles" (sealed containers of two ounces or less) was permitted for on-premises consumption.

=== Article IX ===
Article IX regulates the creation of corporations in the state. Before 1971, this article was quite extensive, but the article now allows much more flexibility as the General Assembly can amend now corporate law at any time rather than requiring a constitutional amendment.

=== Article X ===
Article X establishes the power of the state over taxation and regulates its finances. It underwent extensive revision in 1977. In terms of taxation, its provisions deal with the state's property tax. Other provisions deal with state budgeting and indebtedness, along with the indebtedness of local governments and school districts. Before 1977, 172 amendments dealt specifically with local government indebtedness, as constitutional amendments were required to alter each jurisdiction's debt limit.

=== Article XI ===
Article XI creates the State Board of Education and the position of State Superintendent of Education. A provision also provides that the General Assembly fund schools within the state. The State Supreme Court held in 1999 that the Constitution required a "minimally adequate" education to be granted to children in the case of Abbeville County School District v. South Carolina (335 S.C. 58 (1999)). Subsequent rulings in the case determined that the General Assembly continued to unconstitutionally underfund poorer, rural, districts, but those rulings were later overturned. Article XI also contains a version of the Blaine Amendment, as do many other state constitutions. In the wake of the Supreme Court's ruling in Espinoza v. Montana Department of Revenue, conservative legal commentators suggested these provisions may be unconstitutional.

Prior to 1973, Article XI was much more extensive. For example, Article XI, Section 7 required racial segregation in schools: "Separate schools shall be provided for children of the white and colored races, and no child of either race shall ever be permitted to attend a school provided for children of the other race." This provision was effectively rendered invalid by Brown v. Board of Education. One of the cases that was combined into Brown was a South Carolina case, Briggs v. Elliott. Article XI, Section 7 is removed from the current text of the constitution.

=== Article XII ===
Article XII is entitled "Functions of Government" but primarily deals with the incarceration of convicted criminals, including juveniles. Prior to 1971, the article contained much more extensive detail in this regard. The article also authorizes the General Assembly to create state agencies.

=== Article XIII ===
Article XIII designates the state militia as consisting of "all able-bodied male citizens of the State between the ages of eighteen and forty-five years," except for conscientious objectors. In practice, this provision refers to the South Carolina National Guard and other military reserve units within the state. In 2014, the original section dealing with the position of Adjutant General was amended to make it an appointed rather than elected position. Another provision deals with Confederate pensions.

=== Article XIV ===
Article XIV deals with the state's property rights, a concept commonly known as eminent domain. Prior to 2007, a number of amendments extended this power to specific counties, but these counties are now deemed to fall under the more general eminent domain provision in Article I.

=== Article XV ===
Article XV establishes the procedures for impeachment of public officials. A two-thirds vote of the South Carolina House of Representatives is required to impeach the governor and other state officials, as opposed to the majority required by the U.S. Constitution and most other state constitutions. A two-thirds vote is then required in the Senate to remove the official. The article also permits the Governor to remove an official following a two-thirds vote of both houses of the General Assembly.

=== Article XVI ===
Article XVI lays out the process for amending the constitution. Constitutional amendments must be approved by two-thirds of each house of the legislature, approved by the people in an election, and then ratified by a majority of each house of the legislature. If the legislature fails to ratify the amendment, it does not take effect even though it has been approved by the people. A two-thirds vote of each house of the General Assembly may also call for a constitutional convention.

=== Article XVII ===
Article XVII contains a variety of miscellaneous provisions. The most notable deals with divorce. On April 15, 1949, it was revised to permit divorce for certain reasons. It is believed that South Carolina is the only state in which the grounds for divorce are written into the constitution. The legislature is thus prohibited from creating additional grounds for divorce except by constitutional amendment. A variety of amendments deal with local government finances, and one also authorizes the creation of a state lottery. In 2007, this article was amended to prohibit same-sex marriage. This provision was ruled unconstitutional by a federal court.

=== Amendments ===
A separate section of the Constitution contains three amendments not added into the main body of the document. The first involves eminent domain for land needed for drainage, while the second authorizes the state to construct highways. The third granted home rule to Charleston County in 1968, slightly before home rule was extended to every county.

=== Other provisions ===
Due to extremely strict annexation laws passed by the General Assembly in 1976, incorporated municipalities in South Carolina are usually much smaller in area and population than those elsewhere in the fast-growing Southeast. However, when adjacent suburbs which would be annexed elsewhere are added in, they exhibit sizes and rates of growth similar to many municipalities in neighboring states, such as Georgia and North Carolina.

== See also ==
- Benjamin Tillman
- Black Codes
- Jim Crow laws
- Reconstruction Era
- Bibliography of South Carolina history

== Works cited ==
- Abbott, Richard (1986). The Republican Party and the South, 1855-1877: The First Southern Strategy. University of North Carolina Press. ISBN 0807816809.
- Graham, Jr., Cole Blease (2011). The South Carolina State Constitution. The Oxford Commentaries on the State Constitutions of the United States. New York: Oxford University Press. ISBN 9780199778300.
- Edgar, Walter B. (1998). South Carolina: A History. Columbia, S.C.: University of South Carolina Press. ISBN 1-57003-255-6. OCLC 38964188.
- Wallace, D.D. (1896). "The South Carolina Constitutional Convention of 1895". The Sewanee Review. 4 (3): 348–360. JSTOR 27527896.
