= Mark Hammond (American politician) =

American politician

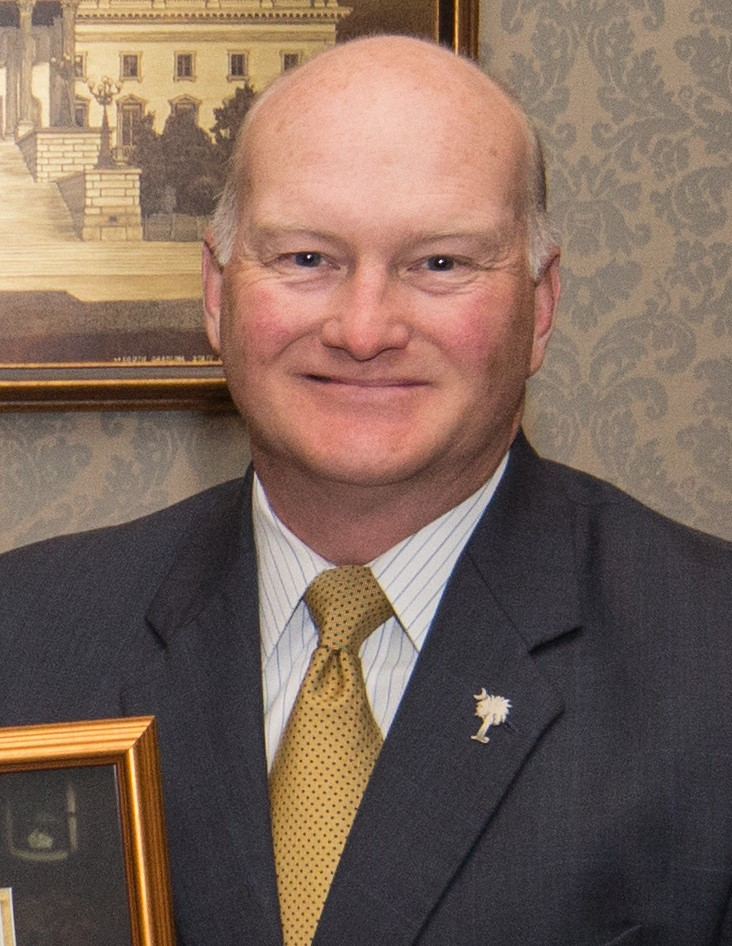
- Hammond in 2015

41st Secretary of State of South Carolina
- Incumbent
- Assumed office January 15, 2003
- Governor: Mark Sanford; Nikki Haley; Henry McMaster; Alan Wilson (elect)
- Preceded by: Jim Miles

Personal details
- Born: John Mark Hammond; November 29, 1963 (age 62) Lancaster, South Carolina, U.S.
- Party: Republican
- Education: Newberry College (BA); Clemson University (MEd)

John Mark Hammond (born November 29, 1963) is an American Republican politician from South Carolina. He has served as South Carolina Secretary of State since January 15, 2003.

== Early life and career ==
Mark Hammond was born in Lancaster, South Carolina, on November 29, 1963, and grew up in Spartanburg, South Carolina. Following graduation from Dorman High School in Spartanburg, he attended Newberry College, graduating with a B.A. in political science in 1986. Two years later, he earned an M.Ed. from Clemson University. He began his professional career as a juvenile probation officer for the South Carolina Department of Youth Services. From 1991 to 1996, he served as a criminal investigator for the Spartanburg County, South Carolina-based 7th Judicial Circuit Solicitor's Office. In 1996, he was elected as Clerk of Courts for Spartanburg County, and was the first Republican to serve in that post since Reconstruction. Hammond succeeded Democrat Ken Huckaby, who had served four terms since 1977. He was elected to a second term as Clerk of Courts in 2000 serving until his election as South Carolina Secretary of State, after which he was succeeded by Marc Kitchens.

== Secretary of State ==
In 2002, Hammond was elected as South Carolina's 41st Secretary of State, after defeating two other candidates in the Republican primary, and winning over 600,000 votes in the general election. He was sworn in on January 15, 2003. Governor Mark Sanford appointed Marc Kitchens to succeed Hammond in the office of Spartanburg County Clerk of Courts.

Beyond his role as Secretary of State, he served the National Association of Secretaries of State (NASS) as chair of International Relations across three terms (2006–07, 2010–11, 2014–15) and as chair (2008–09) and co-chair (2018–19) of Business Services.

He was re-elected in 2006, winning 61% of the vote, which at the time was the largest margin of victory in a contested statewide election in South Carolina history.

In 2010, Hammond was re-elected defeating his opponent, Democrat Marjorie Johnson with 60.9% of the vote.

In 2014, Hammond ran for reelection against Democrat Ginny Deerin whose campaign received a Republican endorsement from former South Carolina First Lady Jenny Sanford. Deerin was also endorsed by the South Carolina Club for Growth, a conservative political organization that usually supports Republicans. She was the first ever Democrat running for statewide office to have been endorsed by the Club for Growth. Both Jenny Sanford and former South Carolina Club for Growth President Chad Walldorf served on the Board of Directors of Wings for Kids, the nonprofit organization founded by Deerin. Deerin had made deregulating nonprofits a central theme of her campaign, which contrasted with Hammond's tough record of charities enforcement. Hammond won reelection with 59.5% of the vote.

In 2018, Hammond was re-elected to a fifth term as Secretary of State and for a sixth term in 2022. He is running for reelection to a seventh term as Secretary of State in 2026.

== Electoral history ==
1996 Spartanburg County Clerk of Court election
Party	Candidate	Votes	%
Republican	Mark Hammond	35,723	56.2%
Democratic	Gail Masters	27,857	43.8%
Total votes		63,580	100.0%

2000 Spartanburg County Clerk of Court election
Party	Candidate	Votes	%
Republican	Mark Hammond (incumbent)	58,393	99.9%
Write-in		87	0.15%
Total votes		58,480	100.0%

2002 South Carolina Secretary of State Republican primary
Party	Candidate	Votes	%
Republican	Mark Hammond	110,761	38.9%
Republican	Ed McMullen	96,451	33.8%
Republican	Lois Eargle	77,769	27.3%
Total votes		284,981	100.0%

2002 South Carolina Secretary of State Republican primary runoff
Party	Candidate	Votes	%
Republican	Mark Hammond	151,942	54.8%
Republican	Ed McMullen	125,567	45.2%
Total votes		277,509	100.0%

2002 South Carolina Secretary of State election
Party	Candidate	Votes	%
Republican	Mark Hammond	605,921	56.8%
Democratic	Rick Wade	460,854	43.2%
Write-in		291	0.03%
Total votes		1,067,066	100.0%

2006 South Carolina Secretary of State Republican primary
Party	Candidate	Votes	%
Republican	Mark Hammond (incumbent)	125,016	58.8%
Republican	Bill McKown	87,744	41.2%
Total votes		212,760	100.0%

2006 South Carolina Secretary of State election
Party	Candidate	Votes	%
Republican	Mark Hammond (incumbent)	656,661	61.2%
Democratic	Cheryl L Footman	415,211	38.7%
Write-in		470	0.04%
Total votes		1,072,342	100.0%

2010 South Carolina Secretary of State election
Party	Candidate	Votes	%
Republican	Mark Hammond (incumbent)	805,783	60.9%
Democratic	Marjorie L. Johnson	516,414	39.0%
Write-in		638	0.05%
Total votes		1,322,835	100.0%

2014 South Carolina Secretary of State election
Party	Candidate	Votes	%
Republican	Mark Hammond (incumbent)	730,739	59.5%
Democratic	Ginny Deerin	496,344	40.4%
Write-in		788	0.06%
Total votes		1,227,871	100.0%

2018 South Carolina Secretary of State Republican primary
Party	Candidate	Votes	%
Republican	Mark Hammond (incumbent)	218,215	65.4%
Republican	Joshua Putnam	44,639	13.4%
Republican	Nelson Faerber	41,570	12.5%
Republican	Kerry Wood	29,075	8.7%
Total votes		333,499	100.0%

2018 South Carolina Secretary of State election
Party	Candidate	Votes	%
Republican	Mark Hammond (incumbent)	970,576	57.1%
Democratic	Melvin T Whittenburg	727,952	42.8%
Write-in		968	0.06%
Total votes		1,699,496	100.0%

2022 South Carolina Secretary of State Republican primary
Party	Candidate	Votes	%
Republican	Mark Hammond (incumbent)	257,131	75.1%
Republican	Keith Blandford	85,050	24.9%
Total votes		342,181	100.0%

2022 South Carolina Secretary of State election
Party	Candidate	Votes	%
Republican	Mark Hammond (incumbent)	1,071,451	63.3%
Democratic	Rosemounda Peggy Butler	619,341	36.6%
Write-in		1,109	0.07%
Total votes		1,691,901	100.0%

Party political offices
Preceded by Jim Miles	Republican nominee for Secretary of State of South Carolina; 2002, 2006, 2010, 2014, 2018, 2022, 2026	Most recent
Legal offices
Preceded by Jim Miles	Secretary of State of South Carolina; 2003–present	Incumbent
