= Secretary of State of South Carolina =

Elected position

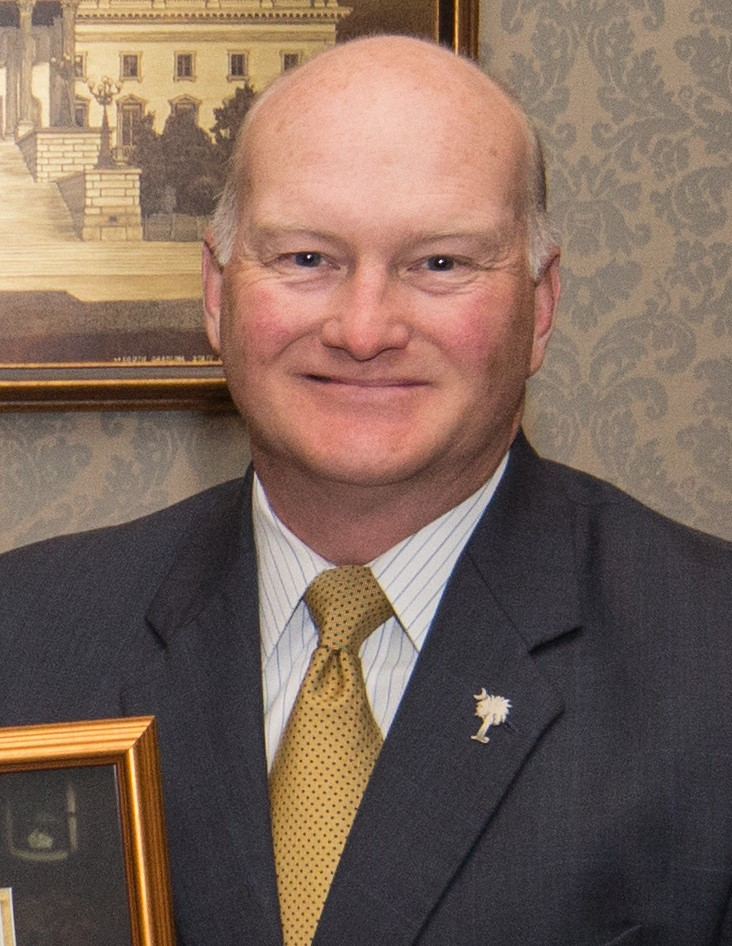
- Incumbent; Mark Hammond
- Status: Constitutional officer
- Seat: Columbia, South Carolina
- Appointer: General election
- Term length: Four years, no term limits
- Salary: $135,000
- Website: sos.sc.gov

The secretary of state of South Carolina is an elected constitutional officer in the executive branch of government of the U.S. state of South Carolina. The secretary of state is the chief clerk of state government in South Carolina and is responsible for registering businesses and trademarks, regulating charities, authorizing cable franchises, commissioning notaries public, and serving as the filing office for municipal records.

The incumbent is Mark Hammond, a Republican who has served as the secretary of state since 2003.

== History ==
As a British colony, the Province of South Carolina had a secretary of the colony appointed by its lords proprietors. The officer was responsible for recording acts of the colony's governor, maintaining the records of the Council of State, writing commissions, and recording land patents. After 1720, the office was filled by appointment of the British Crown. Under South Carolina's 1776 constitution, a Secretary of the Colony was elected by the South Carolina General Assembly and Legislative Council. Two years later, the state adopted a new constitution which required the secretary to be elected by the General Assembly to a term of two years and to maintain copies of all state laws. The state's 1790 constitution extended the incumbent's terms to four years but barred consecutive terms. The document also required the secretary to maintain offices both in the capital of Columbia and the city of Charleston, with the one located in the city in which they did not reside to be regularly staffed by a deputy. In 1868, South Carolina adopted a new constitution which removed the prohibition on consecutive terms and required the secretary to countersign all state grants and commissions and to certify the election of the governor and lieutenant governor. In 1895, South Carolina adopted another constitution which stipulated that the secretary was to be popularly-elected.

== Powers and duties ==
Article VI of the Constitution of South Carolina provides for the election of a secretary of state. The Secretary of State is responsible for filing the registrations of businesses, nonprofit corporations, limited partnerships, limited liability partnerships within South Carolina. The secretary also maintains records of state trademarks, permits statewide cable franchises, and serves as the agent for service of process for companies' not permitted to operate in South Carolina. The secretary is tasked with overseeing the escheatment of real property in the state and regulating charitable organizations, fundraisers, and employment agencies.

In addition to their business-related responsibilities, the secretary also oversees various municipal affairs, including the incorporation of municipalities and special purpose districts and municipal annexations. They are empowered to revoke a municipality's incorporation if the municipality does not deliver any services, does not collect revenue, and fails to hold elections for its officials within four years. The secretary commissions and maintains a list of all notaries public in the state and issues commissions to elected officials and gubernatorial appointees. The secretary collects an annual salary of $135,000.

== Office structure ==
The Office of Secretary of State is led by the secretary of state, followed by the deputy secretary, a general counsel, and a deputy general counsel. As of April 30, 2023, it is staffed by 32 employees. It is organized into eight divisions: Business Filings; Trademarks; Charities; Notaries, Boards and Commissions; Service of Process; Municipalities; and Information Technology.

=== Business Filings Division ===
The Business Filing Division is accountable for filings for business corporations, nonprofit corporations, limited liability companies, limited partnerships, and limited liability partnerships.

The Uniform Commercial Code is another responsibility of the Business Filings Division, this Code conducts the laws of commercial transactions. This includes the sale of goods, commercial paper, bank deposits and collections, letters of credit, bulk transfers, bills of lading and investment securities.

=== Trademarks Division ===
The Trademarks Division maintains a list of all registered trademarks in South Carolina and assists law enforcement in the seizing of any forged goods.

=== Public Charities Division ===
The Public Charities Division registers charities and fundraisers within the state, reviews their annual financial reports, and investigates procesuctes violations of the state law governing charitable solicitation.

=== Notaries Division ===
The Notaries Division maintains apostilles and is responsible for all notary public applications. This division handles all filings for state boards and commissions. A notary is commissioned with a certificate signed by the secretary of state. The secretary of state has the authority to verify the signature of any official filed within the office.

=== Information Technology ===
The Information Technology Division is responsible for maintaining the office's online services and cybersecurity.

== Officeholders ==
Image	Name	Tenure in office	Party	Source
	John Vanderhorst	1783–1787		
	Peter Freneau	1787–1795		
	Stephen Ravenel	1795–1799		
	Isaac Motte Dart	1799–1803		
	Daniel Huger	1803–1807		
	Stephen Lee	1807–1811		
	Daniel James Ravenel	1811–1815		
	John G. Brown	1815–1819		
	Beaufort Taylor Watts	1819–1823		
	William Laval	1823–1827		
	Robert Starke	1827–1830		
	Henry Pendleton Taylor	1830		
	Samuel Hammond	1830–1835	Democratic	
	Benjamin H. Saxon	1835–1839		
	Maximillan LaBorde	1839–1843		
	Roger Quash Pinckney	1843–1847		
	Barnabas Kelet Henagan	1847–1851	Democratic	
	Benjamin Perry	1851–1855		
	James Patterson	1855–1859		
	Isaac Hayes Means	1859–1863		
	W. R. Huntt	1863–1867		
	Ellison Capers	1867–1868		
	Francis Lewis Cardozo	1868–1872	Republican	
	Henry E. Hayne	1872–1876	Republican	
	Robert Moorman Sims	1876–1882	Democratic	
	James Nathan Lipscomb	1882–1886	Democratic	
	William Zachariah Leitner	1886–1888	Democratic	
	John Quitman Marshall	1888–1890	Democratic	
	James E. Tindall	1890–1894	Democratic	
	Daniel Hollard Tompkins	1894–1899	Democratic	
	Marion Reed Cooper	1899–1903	Democratic	
	Jesse T. Gantt	1903–1907	Democratic	
	Robert Maxcy McCown	1907–1917	Democratic	
	William Banks Dove	1917–1924	Democratic	
	William Plumer Blackwell	1924–1949	Democratic	
	Peter Thomas Bradham	1949–1950	Democratic	
	Oscar Frank Thornton	1950–1979	Democratic	
	John T. Campbell	1979–1991	Democratic	
	James M. Miles	1991–2003	Republican	
	Mark Hammond	2003–present	Republican	

== Works cited ==
- Graham, Cole Blease Jr. (2011). The South Carolina State Constitution (revised ed.). Oxford University Press. ISBN 9780199877720.
- History of Secretary of State's Office (PDF), South Carolina House of Representatives Oversight Committee, 2019
- Secretary of State Fiscal Year 2020–2021 Accountability Report (PDF), Office of the South Carolina Secretary of State, 2021
- Whitney, Edson L. (1969). Government of the Colony of South Carolina. New York: Negro Universities Press. LCCN 69-16559.
