= Alex Sanders =

Alex Sanders may refer to:

- Alex Sanders (Wiccan) (1926–1988), high priest of the neopagan religion of Wicca
- Alex Sanders (actor) (born 1966), American pornographic actor
- Alex Sanders (politician) (1939–2026), American politician from South Carolina
