= 2008 United States Senate election in South Carolina =

- November 4, 2008
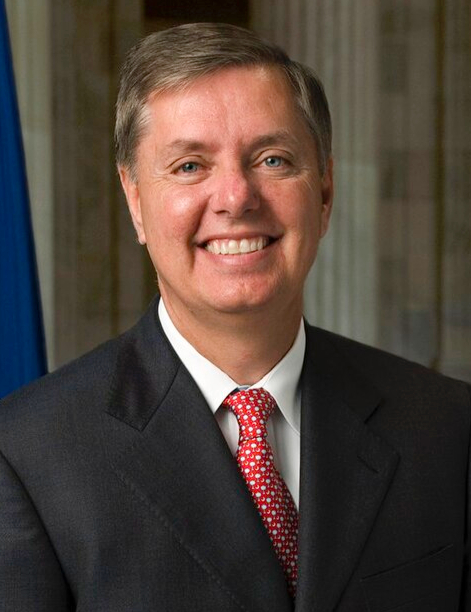

Nominee	Lindsey Graham	Bob Conley
Party	Republican	Democratic
Popular vote	1,076,150	790,216
Percentage	57.52%	42.25%
- Graham: 40–50% 50–60% 60–70% 70–80% 80–90% >90% Conley: 40–50% 50–60% 60–70% 70–80% 80–90% >90%
U.S. senator before election
Lindsey Graham
Republican
Elected U.S. Senator
Lindsey Graham
Republican

The 2008 United States Senate election in South Carolina was held on November 4, 2008, to elect a member of the United States Senate to represent the State of South Carolina. Incumbent Republican U.S. Senator Lindsey Graham won election to a second term.

== Republican primary ==
=== Candidates ===
- Tim Carnes, former pastor
- Lindsey Graham, incumbent U.S. senator
- Buddy Witherspoon, former national committeeman of the South Carolina Republican Party

=== Polling ===
Source	Date	Graham	Witherspoon	Carnes
Public Policy Polling	January 17, 2008	52%	5%	4%

=== Results ===
2008 Republican primary results Graham: 50–60%; 60–70%; 70–80%; 80–90%; Witherspoon: 50–60%

2008 South Carolina U.S. Senate Republican primary election
Party	Candidate	Votes	%
Republican	Lindsey Graham (incumbent)	187,736	66.84%
Republican	Buddy Witherspoon	93,125	33.16%
Total votes		280,861	100.00%

== Democratic primary ==
=== Candidates ===
- Bob Conley, pilot
- Michael Cone, attorney

=== Campaign ===
Conley, a conservative Democrat, supported ending illegal immigration, "protecting American workers," bringing American troops home from the Iraq War, increasing veterans' benefits, reducing American dependence on foreign oil, tougher regulations on Wall Street (bringing back Glass-Steagall), ending Wall Street bailouts, repealing the Patriot Act, "cutting spending," and "fidelity to the Constitution." He also opposed same-sex marriage.

Michael Cone, Conley's primary opponent, criticized Conley for being too conservative, saying, "We've nominated a Republican in a Democratic primary." Conley was a Republican but left the party due to frustration over immigration, trade, and the Iraq War. Some compared him to Republican Congressman Ron Paul, as Conley supported Paul in his presidential campaign.

=== Results ===
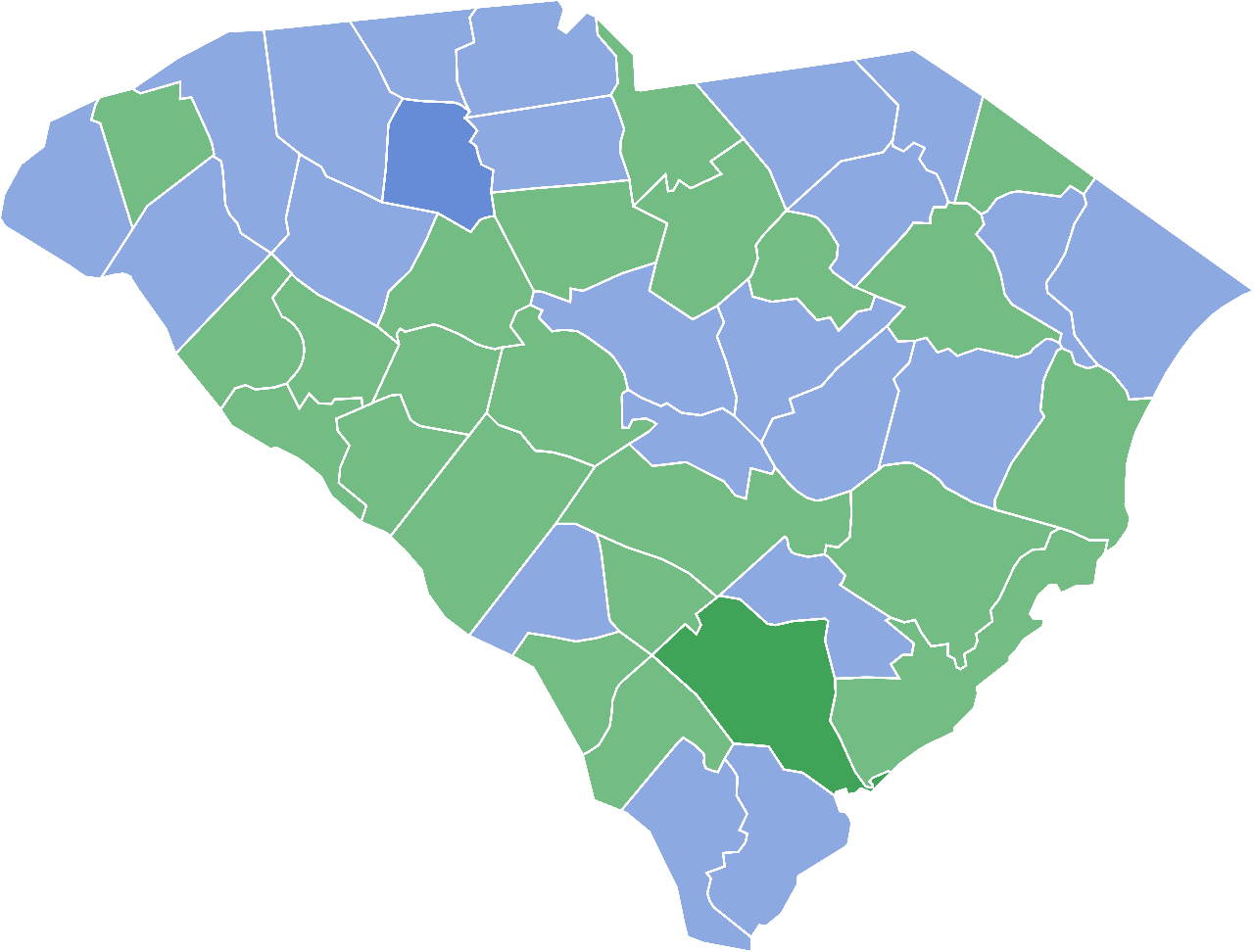
Results by county: Conley—60–70% Conley—50–60% Cone—60–70% Cone—50–60%

Conley defeated Cone in the primary election on June 16, following a recount, by a margin of 1,058 votes.

2008 South Carolina U.S. Senate Democratic primary election
Party	Candidate	Votes	%
Democratic	Bob Conley	74,185	50.36%
Democratic	Michael Cone	73,127	49.64%
Total votes		147,312	100.00%

== General election ==
=== Candidates ===
- Bob Conley (D), pilot
- Lindsey Graham (R), incumbent U.S. senator

=== Campaign ===
Conley, who had switched to the Democratic Party from the Republican Party, was opposed by much of the Democratic establishment because of his controversial positions, such as his vocal opposition to immigration reform and same-sex marriage and his support of Ron Paul's presidential bid. A number of prominent Democratic figures in the state, including U.S. Congressman Jim Clyburn, supported Lindsey Graham over Conley in the general election. Political scientist Bill Moore claimed, "The bottom line is, by not paying attention to this race, they ended up embarrassed by what has transpired: a Republican getting the Democratic Party's nomination for U.S. Senate and a Republican who comes across as even more conservative than Lindsey Graham."

Graham had $3.8 million. He spent more time on the campaign trail for John McCain than he did defending his own seat. Conley only raised $23,628 during the campaign. Conley was so unknown that even Graham admitted "Almost no one knows my opponent. The Democrats really didn't field a — make a serious challenge — in terms of trying to find an opponent for me."

Despite Conley's landslide defeat, he is the last Democrat to carry McCormick County in a Senate election as of 2023.

=== Predictions ===
Source	Ranking	As of
The Cook Political Report	Safe R	October 23, 2008
CQ Politics	Safe R	October 31, 2008
Rothenberg Political Report	Safe R	November 2, 2008
Real Clear Politics	Safe R	November 4, 2008

=== Polling ===
Poll Source	Dates administered	Conley	Graham
Public Policy Polling	July 9–11, 2008	32%	54%
Rasmussen Reports	September 18, 2008	41%	50%
Survey USA	September 21–22, 2008	40%	54%
Survey USA	October 12–13, 2008	40%	56%
Survey USA	October 28–29, 2008	39%	58%

=== Results ===
General election results
Party	Candidate	Votes	%	±%
Republican	Lindsey Graham (incumbent)	1,076,534	57.52%	+3.1%
Democratic	Bob Conley	790,621	42.25%	−1.9%
Write-in		4,276	0.23%	+0.1%
Total votes		1,871,431	100.00%	
Majority		285,913	15.27%	
Republican hold				

==== Counties that flipped from Democratic to Republican ====
- Calhoun (largest town: St. Matthews)
- Darlington (largest city: Hartsville)
- Dillon (largest city: Dillon)
- Abbeville (largest city: Abbeville)
- Chesterfield (largest city: Cheraw)
- Lancaster (largest city: Lancaster)

== See also ==
- 2008 United States Senate elections
- 2008 United States House of Representatives elections in South Carolina
