= Lindsey Graham =

American politician and attorney (1955–2026)

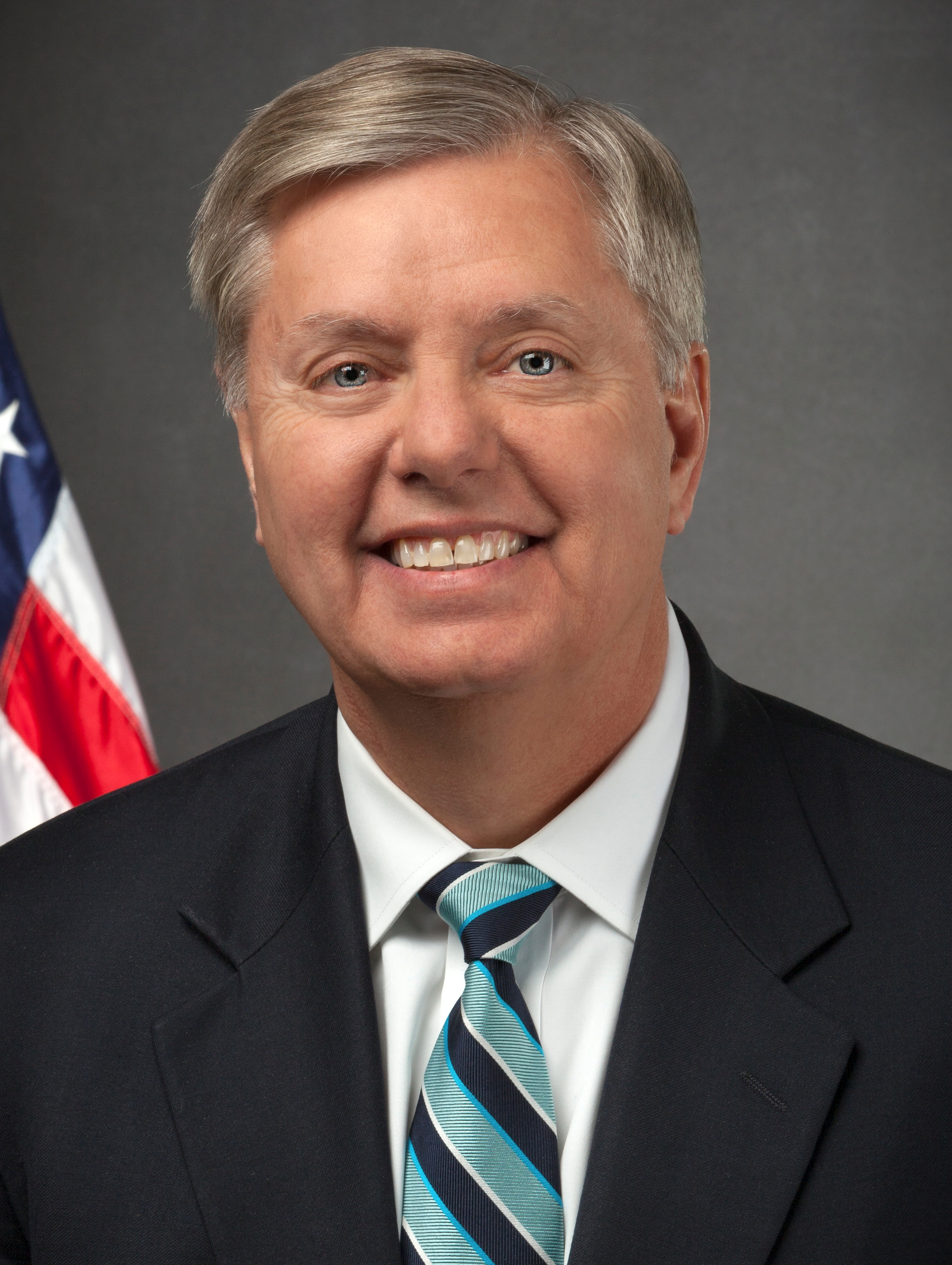
- Official portrait, 2013

United States Senator from South Carolina
- In office January 3, 2003 – July 11, 2026
- Preceded by: Strom Thurmond
- Succeeded by: Darline Graham
Senate positions
Chair of the Senate Budget Committee
In office January 3, 2025 – July 11, 2026
Preceded by	Sheldon Whitehouse
Succeeded by	Ron Johnson
Ranking Member of the Senate Judiciary Committee
In office January 3, 2023 – January 3, 2025
Preceded by	Chuck Grassley
Succeeded by	Dick Durbin
Ranking Member of the Senate Budget Committee
In office February 3, 2021 – January 3, 2023
Preceded by	Bernie Sanders
Succeeded by	Chuck Grassley
Chair of the Senate Judiciary Committee
In office January 3, 2019 – February 3, 2021
Preceded by	Chuck Grassley
Succeeded by	Dick Durbin

Member of the U.S. House of Representatives from South Carolina's 3rd district
- In office January 3, 1995 – January 3, 2003
- Preceded by: Butler Derrick
- Succeeded by: Gresham Barrett

Member of the South Carolina House of Representatives from the 2nd district
- In office November 9, 1992 – November 14, 1994
- Preceded by: Lowell Ross
- Succeeded by: Bill Sandifer III

Personal details
- Born: Lindsey Olin Graham; July 9, 1955 Seneca, South Carolina, U.S.
- Died: July 11, 2026 (aged 71) Washington, D.C., U.S.
- Party: Republican
- Relatives: Darline Graham (sister)
- Education: University of South Carolina (BA, JD)

Military service
- Allegiance: United States
- Branch/service: United States Air Force; Air National Guard; Air Force Reserve
- Years of service: 1982–1989 (active); 1989–1995 (guard); 1995–2015 (reserve)
- Rank: Colonel
- Unit: Air Force Judge Advocate General's Corps; South Carolina Air National Guard
- Awards: Bronze Star Medal; Meritorious Service Medal
- Graham's voice Graham on the links between food insecurity and terrorist recruitment Recorded May 11, 2022

Lindsey Olin Graham (Note: /ɡræm/ GRAM) (July 9, 1955 – July 11, 2026) was an American politician, attorney, and military officer who represented South Carolina in the United States Senate from 2003 until his death in 2026. A member of the Republican Party, he represented South Carolina's 3rd congressional district in the U.S. House of Representatives from 1995 to 2003 and served in the South Carolina House of Representatives from 1993 to 1994.

Born in Seneca, South Carolina, Graham graduated from the University of South Carolina and its law school. He served on active duty in the United States Air Force from 1982 to 1989 as a member of the Judge Advocate General's Corps, working as a defense attorney and as the Air Force's chief prosecutor in Europe. He later served in the South Carolina Air National Guard and the United States Air Force Reserve, retiring as a colonel in 2015. He received the Bronze Star Medal in 2014 for his legal work relating to military operations in Iraq and Afghanistan.

Graham was first elected to Congress in 1994, drawing national attention as a member of the House Judiciary Committee and as a House impeachment manager during the impeachment trial of President Bill Clinton. He was elected to the Senate in 2002 and reelected in 2008, 2014, and 2020. He won the Republican nomination for a fifth term in June 2026 but died before the general election a month later from an aortic dissection at the age of 71. Governor Henry McMaster appointed Graham's sister, Darline Graham, to serve out the remainder of Graham's fourth term.

A war hawk, Graham advocated an interventionist role for the United States and was a prominent supporter of Israel, Ukraine, and the North Atlantic Treaty Organization. He frequently worked with members of both parties, particularly on immigration and national-security legislation, and was closely associated with senators John McCain and Joe Lieberman, with whom he formed a group known as the "Three Amigos". Graham chaired the Senate Judiciary Committee from 2019 to 2021 and the Senate Budget Committee from 2025 until his death. He also played a prominent role in the confirmation of President Donald Trump's judicial nominees.

Graham sought the Republican presidential nomination in 2016 but withdrew before the primaries began. Initially an outspoken critic of Trump during Trump's 2016 campaign, he later became one of Trump's closest congressional allies and supported him throughout both his presidencies.

== Early life ==
Lindsey Olin Graham was born on July 9, 1955, in Seneca, South Carolina. Growing up, his parents, Florence James "F.J." Graham and Millie Graham (née Walters), operated a restaurant, bar, liquor store, and pool hall in Central, South Carolina. The family lived in rooms behind the business. His family was of Scotch-Irish descent.

After graduating from D. W. Daniel High School, Graham became the first member of his family to attend college and joined the Reserve Officers' Training Corps. When he was 20, his mother died of Hodgkin's lymphoma at age 50, and his father died 15 months later of a heart attack at age 68. Because his sister Darline, then 13 years old, was left orphaned, the service allowed Graham to attend the University of South Carolina in Columbia so he could remain near home as his sister's legal guardian. During his studies, he became a member of the Pi Kappa Phi social fraternity.

Graham said his parents' early deaths made him mature more quickly and Darline, who introduced her brother at his 2016 announcement of his candidacy for president, said she hoped to be with him on the campaign trail frequently to show voters his softer side. "He's kind of like a brother, a father and a mother rolled into one", she said. "I've always looked up to Lindsey."

Graham graduated from the University of South Carolina with a Bachelor of Arts in psychology in 1977. He obtained his Juris Doctor from the University of South Carolina School of Law in 1981.

== U.S. Air Force officer (1982–2015) ==
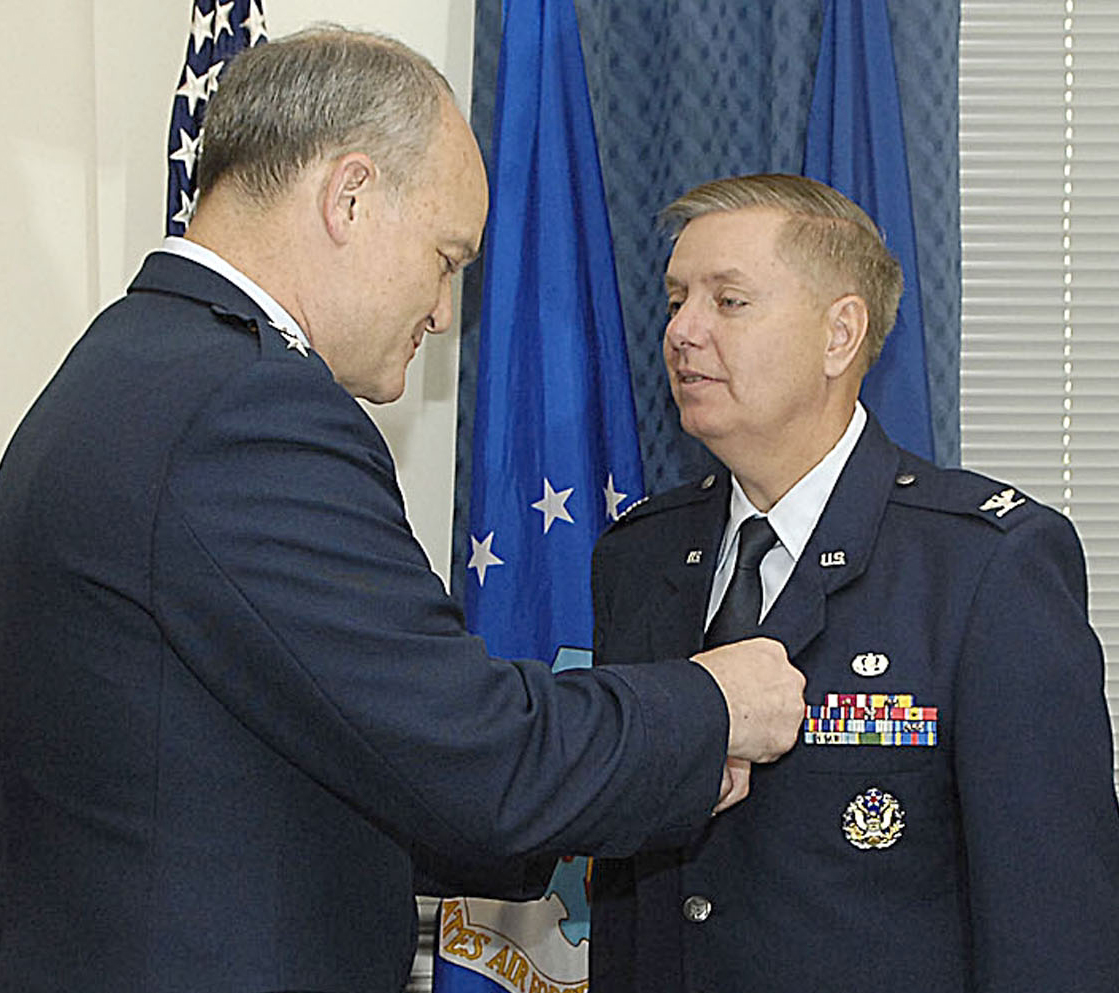
Lt. Gen. Jack L. Rives pins the Meritorious Service Medal on Colonel Lindsey Graham, April 2009

Upon graduating from the University of South Carolina School of Law, Graham was commissioned as an officer in the Judge Advocate General's Corps (JAG Corps) in the United States Air Force in 1982 and began active duty that year. His military service began as an Air Force defense attorney. He was stationed at Shaw Air Force Base from 1982 to 1984. He was later transferred to Rhein-Main Air Base in Frankfurt, West Germany, where he served as the Air Force's chief prosecutor in Europe from 1984 to 1988. In 1984, as he was defending an Air Force pilot accused of using marijuana, he was featured in an episode of 60 Minutes that exposed the Air Force's defective drug-testing procedures. After his service in Europe, he returned to South Carolina, leaving active duty in 1989 and entering a private law practice in Walhalla with Larry Brandt. He served as assistant county attorney for Oconee County from 1988 to 1992. In 1992, he won a $5 million medical malpractice case that awarded him US$200,000 in split-earnings. He was a city attorney for Central from 1990 to 1994.

After leaving the Air Force, Graham joined the South Carolina Air National Guard in 1989, where he served until 1995, then joining the U.S. Air Force Reserve.

In 1998, the Capitol Hill daily newspaper The Hill contended that Graham was describing himself on his website as an Operation Desert Shield and Desert Storm veteran. Graham responded: "I have not told anybody I'm a combatant. I'm not a war hero, and never said I was. ... If I have lied about my military record, I'm not fit to serve in Congress", further noting that he "never deployed".

In 1998, Graham was promoted to lieutenant colonel. In 2004, he received his promotion to colonel in the U.S. Air Force Reserve at a White House ceremony officiated by President George W. Bush. That year, a lower court determined that Graham's service as a military judge while a sitting member of the Senate was acceptable. In 2006, the Court of Appeals for the Armed Forces set aside the lower court's ruling after concluding it was improper for Graham to serve as a military judge.

In 2007, Graham served in Iraq as a reservist on active duty for a short period in April and for two weeks in August, where he worked on detainee and rule of law issues. He also served in Afghanistan during the August 2009 Senate recess. He was then assigned as a senior instructor at the Judge Advocate General's School, though he never went.

In 2014, Graham received a Bronze Star Medal for meritorious service as a senior legal adviser to the Air Force in Iraq and Afghanistan from August 2009 to July 2014, overseeing the detention of military prisoners. In 2015, he retired at his last rank of colonel from the Air Force with over 33 total years of service, after reaching the statutory retirement age of 60 for his rank. Graham earned points toward a military pension but was unpaid as an Air Force officer while a member of Congress as he was ineligible for a military paycheck during his time in federal government service.

== South Carolina House of Representatives (1993–1994) ==
In 1992, Graham was elected to the South Carolina House of Representatives from the 2nd district, in Oconee County. He defeated Democratic incumbent, Lowell W. Ross, 60% to 40%, and served one term, from 1993 to 1994. His first bill in the House sought to ban gays and lesbians from service in the South Carolina Army National Guard. It did not pass. He proposed a bill that would impose a limit of 12 consecutive years for a state legislator. He served on the Judiciary Committee.

== U.S. House of Representatives (1995–2003) ==
=== U.S. House elections ===
In 1994, 20-year incumbent Democratic U.S. congressman Butler Derrick of South Carolina's northwestern-based 3rd congressional district decided to retire. Graham ran to succeed him and, with Republican U.S. senator Strom Thurmond campaigning on his behalf, won the Republican primary with 52% of the vote, defeating Bob Cantrell (33%) and Ed Allgood (15%). In the general election, Graham defeated Democratic State Senator James Bryan Jr., 60% to 40%. As a part of that year's Republican Revolution, Graham campaigned in support of Newt Gingrich's Contract with America legislative agenda and became the first Republican to represent the district since 1877.

In 1996, he was challenged by Debbie Dorn, the niece of Butler Derrick and daughter of Derrick's predecessor, 13-term Democratic congressman William Jennings Bryan Dorn. Graham was reelected, defeating Dorn 60% to 40%. In 1998, he was reelected to a third term unopposed. In 2000, he was reelected to a fourth term, defeating Democratic nominee George Brightharp, 68% to 30%.

=== U.S. House tenure ===
Graham speaking during Clinton's impeachment on December 18, 1998, and also discussing the grounds for impeachment of Richard Nixon and other presidents

In 1994, Graham, along with other Republicans elected that year, promised to serve no more than 12 years in office. In 1995, he was one of five Republicans to vote against settling a budget standoff that caused a government shutdown. In 1997, he took part in a leadership challenge against House Speaker Newt Gingrich.

In November 1997, Graham was one of 18 House Republicans to co-sponsor a resolution by Bob Barr that sought to launch an impeachment inquiry into President Bill Clinton. The resolution did not specify any charges or allegations. This was an early effort to impeach Clinton, predating the eruption of the Clinton–Lewinsky scandal. The eruption of that scandal ultimately led to a more serious effort to impeach Clinton in 1998. On October 8, 1998, Graham voted in favor of legislation to open an impeachment inquiry. He was a member of the Judiciary Committee, which conducted the inquiry.

In both the Judiciary Committee vote on forwarding proposed articles of impeachment, and the full House vote on the proposed articles of impeachment, Graham voted for three of the four proposed articles of impeachment. He voted against the second count of perjury in the Paula Jones case. This made him the only Republican on the Judiciary Committee to vote against any of the proposed articles of impeachment. During the inquiry, Graham asked, "Is this Watergate or Peyton Place?" The House passed two of the impeachment articles. Graham served as a House impeachment manager in the impeachment trial.

In 1999 and 2001, Graham sponsored the Unborn Victims of Violence Act in the House. It passed by margins of 254–172 and 252–172 in 1999 and 2001, respectively. The bill sought to make it a federal crime to harm a fetus during an assault of its mother, except by medical professionals with the mother's consent. In both cases, the Senate did not take up the bill for a vote. In 2004, the similar Unborn Victims of Violence Act was signed into law.

After the September 11 attacks, Graham voted for the Patriot Act and the Authorization for Use of Military Force of 2001. In 2002, Graham voted for the Iraq resolution.

=== U.S. House committee assignments ===
During his service in the House, Graham had served on the following committees:

- Committee on International Relations (1995–1998)
- Committee on Education and the Workforce (1995–2002)
- Committee on the Judiciary (1997–2002)
- Committee on National Security (1999–2002)

== U.S. Senate (2003–2026) ==
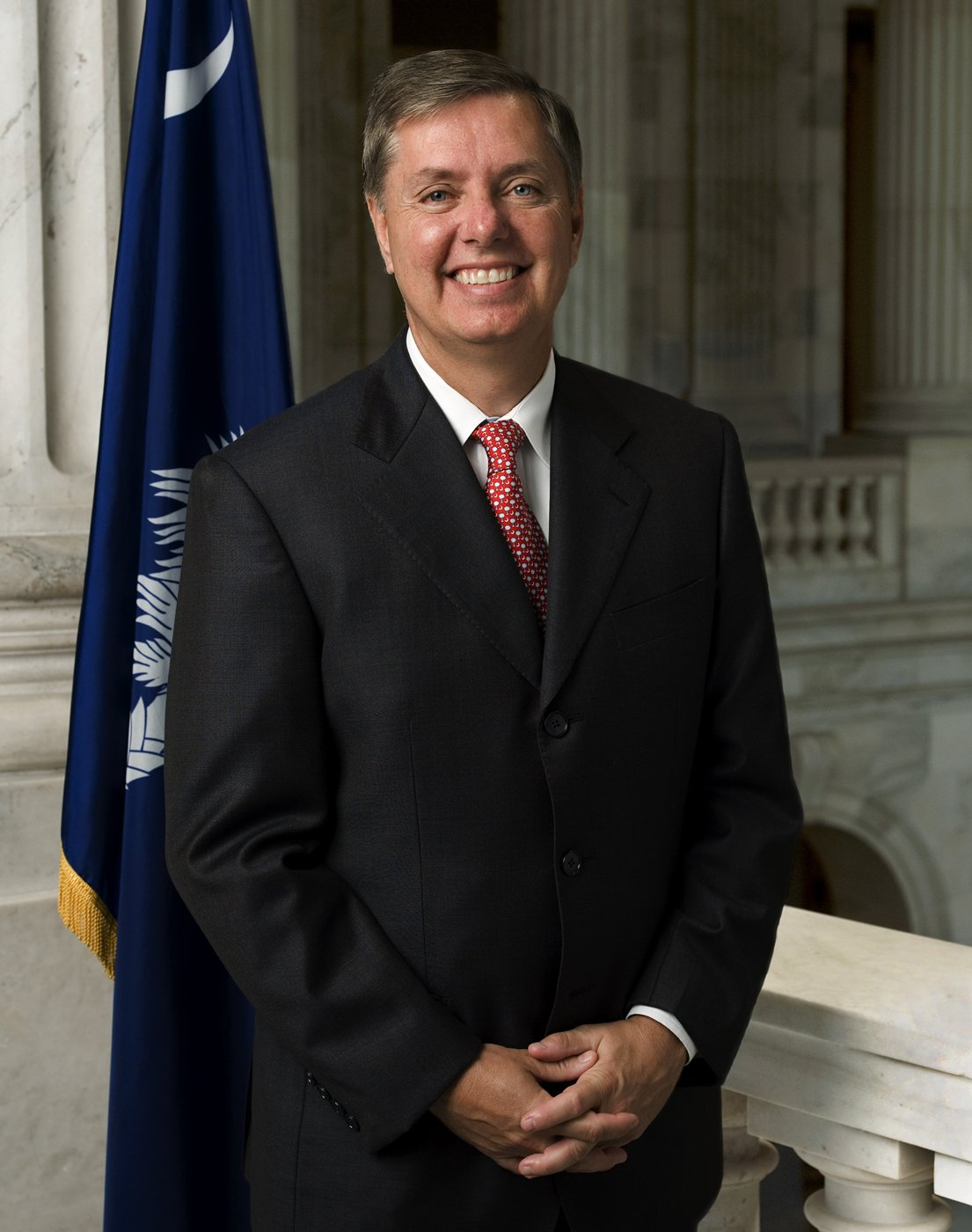
Official portrait, 2006

=== Senate elections ===
==== 2002 ====
In 2001, Bob Dole signed on as the chairman of the national steering committee for Graham's campaign for the U.S. Senate. In 2002, longtime U.S. senator Strom Thurmond decided to retire. Graham ran to succeed him and won the Republican primary unopposed. In the general election, he defeated Democratic nominee Alex Sanders, former president of the College of Charleston and former chief judge of the South Carolina Court of Appeals, 54.40% to 44.19%. Before the election, Graham promised to serve no more than two six-year terms in office. He became South Carolina's first new U.S. senator since Fritz Hollings in 1966.

==== 2008 ====
Graham ran for a second term in 2008, and was challenged in the Republican primary by National Executive Committeeman of the South Carolina Republican Party, Buddy Witherspoon. Graham won renomination, 66.82% to 33.18%, winning all but one of South Carolina's 46 counties.

In the general election, Graham defeated Democratic nominee Bob Conley, a pilot and engineer, 57.53% to 42.25%. He outspent Conley, $6.6 million to $15,000.

==== 2014 ====
Graham ran for reelection in 2014. Of the Republican senators up for reelection that year, he was considered one of the most vulnerable to a primary challenge, largely due to his low approval ratings and reputation for working with and compromising with Democrats. He expected a primary challenge from conservative activists, including the Tea Party movement, and Chris Chocola, President of the Club for Growth, said his organization would support a primary challenge if an acceptable standard-bearer emerged.

But no serious challenger to Graham emerged, and he was widely viewed as likely to win, which has been ascribed to his "deft maneuvering" and "aggressive" response to the challenge. He befriended potential opponents from the state's congressional delegation and helped them with fundraising and securing their preferred committee assignments. He assembled a "daunting multimillion-dollar political operation" dubbed the "Graham machine" that built six regional offices across the state and enlisted the support of thousands of paid staffers and volunteers, including over 5,000 precinct captains; built a "staggering" campaign war chest and "blanketed" the state with ads; focused on constituent services and local issues; and refused to "pander" to Tea Party supporters, instead confronting them head-on, arguing that the Republican Party needed to be more inclusive.

In the run-up to the Republican primary, Graham's approval rating improved. A February 2013 Winthrop poll found that he had a 59% positive rating among likely Republican voters.

In June 2014, Graham won the Republican primary with 56.42% of the vote in a crowded field. His closest challenger, State Senator Lee Bright, received 15.4%. His other primary opponents included Richard Cash and Nancy Mace.

In the general election, Graham defeated the Democratic nominee, State Senator Brad Hutto, 54% to 39%. Independent Thomas Ravenel (a former Republican State Treasurer), and Libertarian Victor Kocher received 3.8% and 2.7% of the vote, respectively.

==== 2020 ====
Graham ran for reelection in 2020, winning renomination in the Republican primary with 67.69% of the vote against three other candidates.

Democrat Jaime Harrison challenged Graham in the general election. The race was considered potentially competitive, with several polls in its final months showing a close race and Harrison posting record fundraising numbers, but Graham won by more than 10 points, 54.4% to 44.2%.

==== 2026 ====
Graham ran for reelection in 2026. On January 14, 2025, he announced lead officials for his campaign, including the former chairman of the South Carolina Republican Party and Governor Henry McMaster's campaign manager. He reported $15.6 million in campaign fundraising. Trump endorsed Graham on March 26, 2025.

At the time of his death, Graham was running for reelection to a fifth Senate term as the Republican nominee. On June 9, 2026, he had won the Republican primary with 56.8% of the vote against five other candidates. Graham died on July 11, and, on July 13, South Carolina Governor Henry McMaster appointed Graham's sister, Darline Graham, to serve the remainder of his fourth term. Darline Graham went on to win the special primary runoff, and became the Republican nominee.

=== Senate committee assignments ===
At the time of his death, Graham served on these committees:

- Committee of Judiciary
- Committee on Appropriations
- Committee on Environment and Public Works
- Budget Committee (chair).

=== Caucus memberships ===
- Congressional Caucus on Turkey and Turkish Americans
- International Conservation Caucus
- Senate National Guard Caucus (Co-chair)
- Sportsmen's Caucus
- Senate Oceans Caucus
- Senate Taiwan Caucus

Graham was a member of the board of directors of the International Republican Institute.

=== Relationship with Donald Trump ===
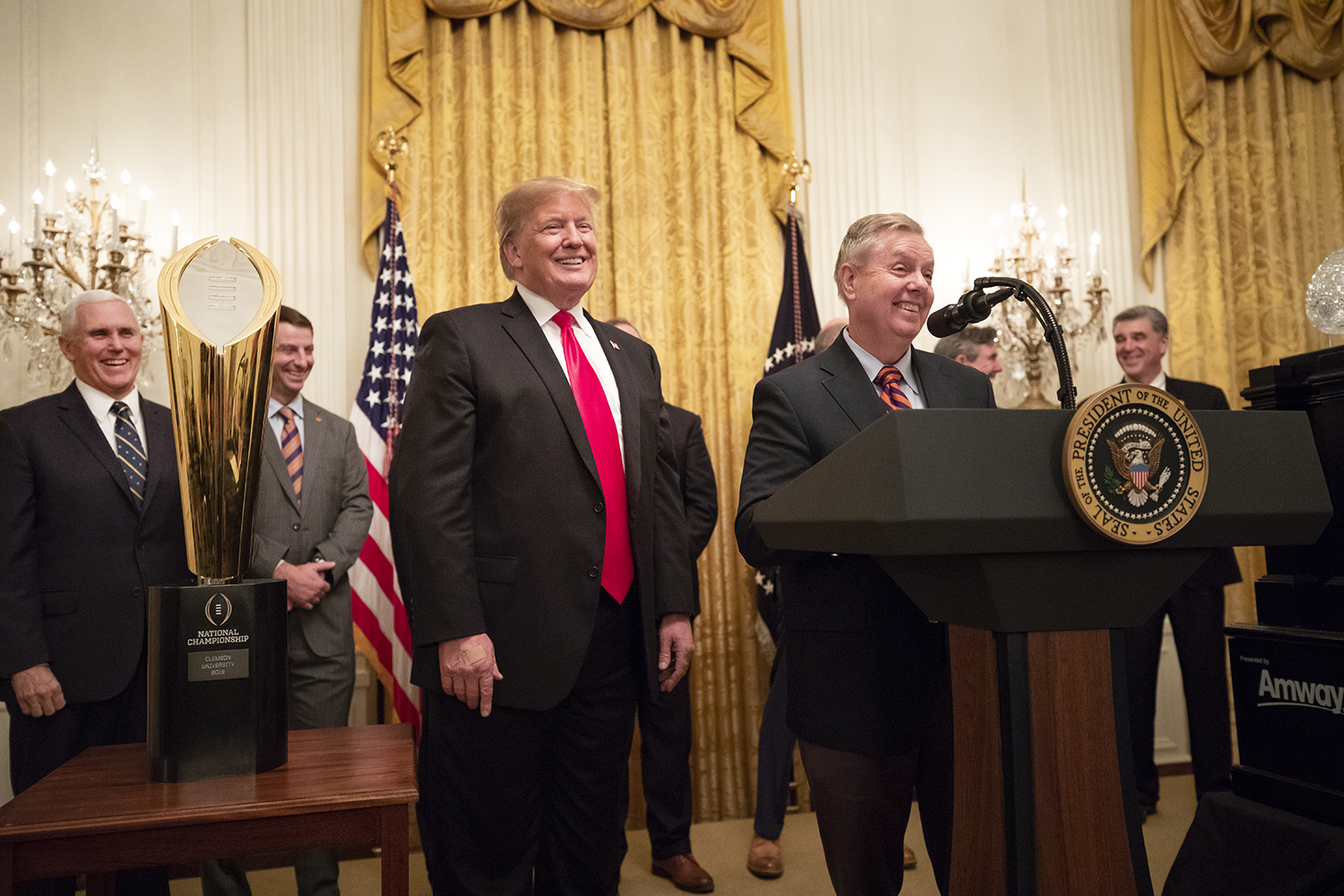
Graham and Donald Trump in January 2019

In July 2015, when Graham was a presidential candidate, he called Donald Trump, then another presidential candidate, a "jackass" for saying that Graham's close friend, Senator John McCain, was "not a war hero". Trump reacted by calling Graham an "idiot" and revealing Graham's personal cellphone number at a campaign rally, asking people to call Graham.

In December 2015, Trump, the front-runner for the Republican presidential nomination, called for a ban on Muslims entering the United States. Graham, who had very little support as a presidential candidate, responded: "He's a race-baiting, xenophobic, religious bigot ... He doesn't represent my [Republican] party ... I don't think he has a clue about anything ... He is empowering radical Islam ... You know how you make America great again? Tell Donald Trump to go to hell." He added, "I'd rather lose without Donald Trump than try to win with him."

In May 2016 Graham tweeted, "If we nominate Trump, we will get destroyed...and we will deserve it."

In June 2016, after Trump criticized a judge of Mexican heritage, implying he could be biased, Graham said to CNN: "I don't think [Trump is] racist but he's playing the race card ... I think it's very un-American ... If he continues this line of attack then I think people really need to reconsider the future of the [Republican] party." Graham told The New York Times that that incident "is probably it" for anyone looking to withdraw their support of Trump: "There'll come a time when the love of country will trump hatred of Hillary Clinton", the Democratic nominee for president.

In the November presidential election, Graham did not vote for Trump, saying, "I couldn't go where Donald Trump wanted to take the USA & GOP." He voted for independent candidate Evan McMullin.

After a March 2017 meeting with Trump, Graham became a vocal ally of his, often issuing public statements in his defense and catching members of both parties by surprise. Graham said that the meeting went so well that he passed his new phone number to Trump, in reference to their 2015 conflict. Commentators have noted that Graham's public reconciliation with Trump coincided with his expanded influence on foreign policy, supporting military interventions, increased defense spending, and a more aggressive U.S. role abroad.

In October 2017, Graham and Trump played golf together on multiple occasions, with Graham praising the first outing. In November 2017, Graham criticized the media's reporting on Trump: "What concerns me about the American press is this endless, endless attempt to label the guy some kind of kook not fit to be president." (In February 2016, Graham said of Trump: "I think he's a kook. I think he's crazy. I think he's unfit for office.")

In April 2018, Graham said that he would support Trump's reelection in 2020. In January 2019, Graham said that Republicans must support Trump's policies: "If we undercut the president, that's the end of his presidency and the end of our party."

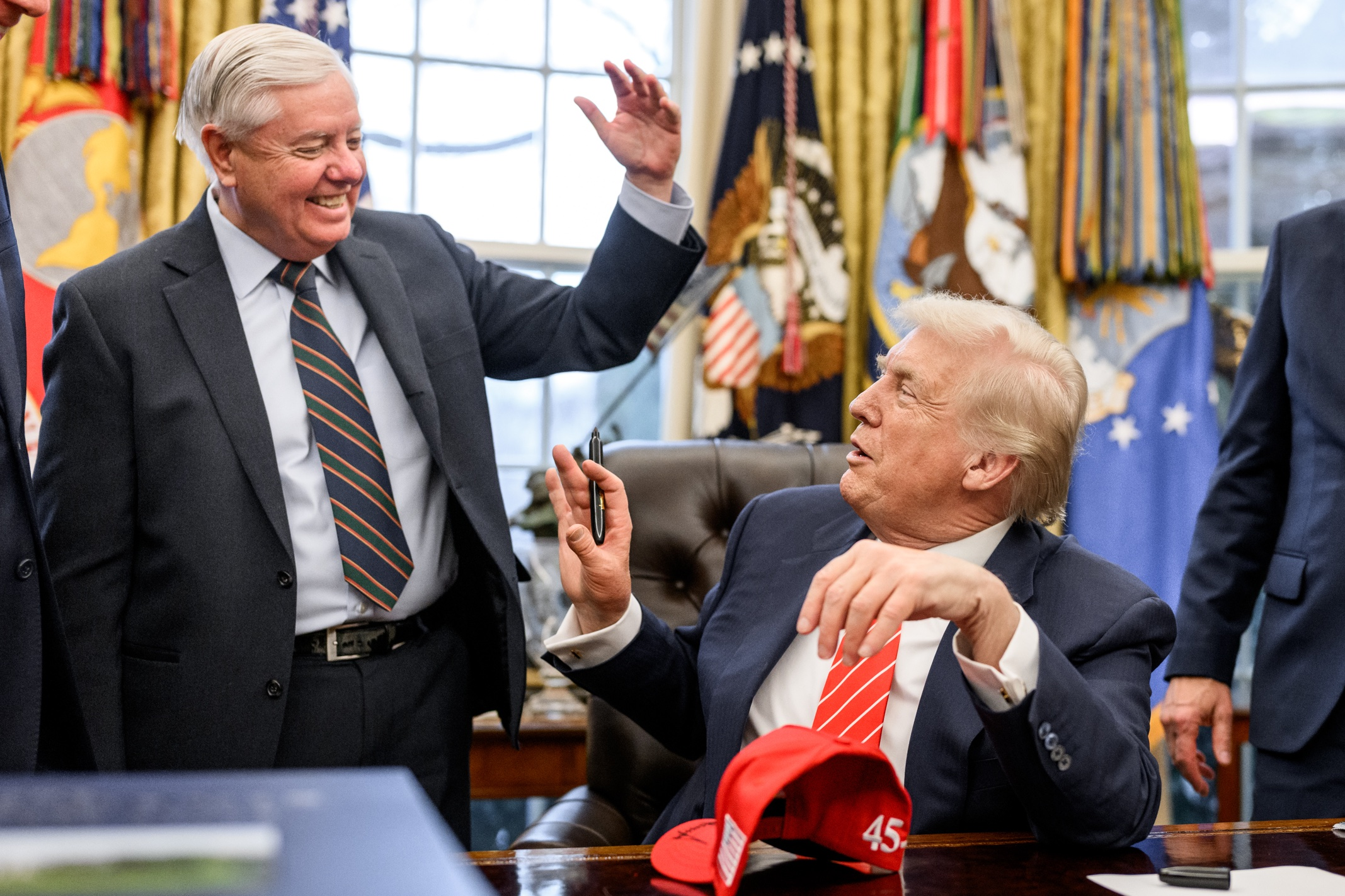
Graham and Donald Trump in February 2026

In February 2019 Mark Leibovich interviewed Graham for The New York Times Magazine. He asked Graham how he became a prominent Trump supporter. Graham responded that he was attempting "to be relevant": "I've got an opportunity up here working with the president to get some really good outcomes for the country ... I have never been called this much by a president in my life ... He's asked me to do some things, and I've asked him to do some things in return." Graham said he had been gaining influence with Trump and was attempting to enter Trump's inner circle, where he would reach a level of influence on par with Melania Trump, Ivanka Trump, and Jared Kushner. He said that he had had a "political marriage" with John McCain, but as for his relationship with Trump: "I personally like him. We play golf. He's very nice to me." Graham also said that a good relationship with Trump would help his prospects of reelection to the Senate in 2020.

Seven months after the death of McCain, one of Graham's "dearest friends", Trump repeatedly criticized McCain. Graham was then criticized for not standing up for McCain. Graham responded, "To all those people who bring up this narrative, you just hate Trump ... You're not offended about me and McCain; you're trying to use me to get to Trump ... I'm not into this idea that the only way to honor John McCain is to trash out Trump." He also said, "The bottom line here is I'm going to help President Trump." McCain had banned Trump from his funeral. Trump's daughter Ivanka attended his funeral, reportedly at the invitation of Graham, who had reportedly gotten McCain's wife's permission. According to Graham, Trump called him after he delivered an emotional farewell to McCain on the Senate floor, telling him he "did right by his friend."

On May 14, 2019, Graham came under scrutiny, including from Senator Joe Manchin, after encouraging Donald Trump Jr. to ignore a subpoena delivered by the Senate Intelligence Committee.

In July 2019, Graham said he did not think Trump was racist and that he did not think that Trump's statements that certain Democratic congresswomen should "go back and help fix the totally broken and crime infested places from which they came" were racist. Graham said, "I don't think a Somali refugee embracing Trump would be asked to go back. If you're racist, you want everybody to go back because they are black or Muslim." Earlier in August 2018, The Washington Post reported that Graham had said, "I have never heard him make a single racist statement. Not even close."

On October 8, 2019, during an interview with Jonathan Swan of Axios, Graham condemned Trump's announcement of an intention to withdraw United States troops from northern Syria, saying that Trump was putting the nation and his presidency at risk, and that it was without the support of key national security advisers. Media noted Graham's reversals and Trump's apparent lack of appreciation for his advice.

In December 2019, as two articles of impeachment against Trump moved to a vote before the full House and referral to the Senate for trial, Graham said, "I am trying to give a pretty clear signal I have made up my mind. I'm not trying to pretend to be a fair juror here", adding, "this thing will come to the Senate, and it will die quickly, and I will do everything I can to make it die quickly." He also announced that he held "disdain for the accusations and the process. So I don't need any witnesses" for the Senate trial. In response, Democrats referenced statements Graham made during the 1998 impeachment of Bill Clinton, including his citation of Richard Nixon as proof that a president who ignored a subpoena should be impeached for taking "the power from Congress over the impeachment process away from Congress" and becoming "judge and jury" himself.

In April 2024, Graham criticized Trump for not supporting a federal abortion ban. In reply, Trump expressed regret for endorsing Graham in his 2020 Senate campaign.

In January 2025, Graham took issue with a series of Trump's first actions as president. Graham said it was "a mistake" for Trump to pardon criminal defendants who pleaded guilty to or were convicted of violent crimes during the January 6 attack on the Capitol, citing concerns about condoning violence and undermining support of law enforcement officers. Graham said Congress should "revisit" the scope of the presidential pardon power in light of the January 6 pardons and President Joe Biden's pardons for his family members. Next, Graham disagreed with Trump's decision to remove the security details provided to former National Security Advisor John Bolton and former Secretary of State Mike Pompeo. Lastly, Graham defended Trump's decision to fire 17 Inspectors General, but criticized Trump for "technically" violating the law by not giving Congress 30 days' notice of the firings.

==== Reaction to 2020 presidential election results ====
After all major news networks projected that Joe Biden had won the 2020 United States presidential election, Graham said that Trump "should not concede" because "if Republicans don't challenge and change the U.S. election system, there will never be another Republican president elected again". Graham said he donated $500,000 to Trump's election lawsuits in various states, and that the option should be "on the table" for Republican state legislators to invalidate election results due to alleged "corruption" by appointing presidential electors who would vote for Trump.

After receiving an affidavit by Pennsylvania postal worker Richard Hopkins alleging that his postmaster discussed backdating mail ballots, Graham issued a statement that "all credible allegations of voting irregularities and misconduct be investigated to ensure the integrity of the 2020 elections", including Hopkins's. Hopkins's affidavit was released by Project Veritas, a conservative organization known for using deceptive tactics; Project Veritas later released a recording in which Hopkins says that he did not hear his postmaster explicitly discuss backdating ballots, and that Project Veritas wrote his affidavit for him.

The 2020 United States presidential election in Georgia produced an initial count where Biden defeated Trump by around 14,000 votes, triggering a recount due to the small margin. During the recount, Graham privately called the Georgia Secretary of State, Brad Raffensperger, to discuss Georgia's vote counting. Raffensperger, a Republican, told The Washington Post that Graham had asked Raffensperger whether Raffensperger could disqualify all mail-in ballots in counties with more signature errors. Gabriel Sterling, a Republican election official and staffer to Raffensperger, was present on the call; Sterling confirmed that Graham had asked that question. Raffensperger viewed Graham's question as a suggestion to throw out legally cast ballots. Graham denied suggesting this. Graham acknowledged calling Raffensperger to find out how to "protect the integrity of mail-in voting" and "how does signature verification work", but said that if Raffensperger "feels threatened by that conversation, he's got a problem". Graham said that he was investigating in his capacity as a senator, although he was the chair of the Senate Judiciary Committee. He went on to claim that he had also spoken to Arizona's and Nevada's secretaries of state. Those secretaries denied this, and Graham reversed himself, saying that he had spoken to the governor of Arizona and no official in Nevada. The Washington Post reported in February 2021 that Fani Willis, the Fulton County, Georgia district attorney, was examining Graham's phone call to Raffensperger as part of a criminal investigation into possible efforts to illegally overturn Georgia's election results.

On January 6, 2021, Graham, Vice President Mike Pence, and members of the Senate and House were evacuated from the Capitol building after Trump supporters attacked the United States Capitol. The joint session of Congress reconvened late into the night and the early morning in the Senate chamber to count and confirm the Electoral College votes. Graham spoke, disagreeing with many of his Republican colleagues, who mostly supported Trump's denials of the election's results, saying, "it's a uniquely bad idea to delay this election", and though "I hate it", they could "count me out, enough is enough". He finished by saying, "Joe Biden and Kamala Harris are lawfully elected and will become the President and the Vice President of the United States on January the 20th."

In the resulting second impeachment trial of Donald Trump, Graham voted "not guilty".

On May 28, 2021, Graham voted against creating the January 6 commission.

In August 2021, The New York Times reported that Graham called Biden days after the election in an effort to revive their friendship and told Biden he had called for a special counsel investigation of Biden's son Hunter during the campaign only to appease Trump supporters among his constituents. A Graham spokesman disputed the Times' account.

==== 2024 election ====
Graham appeared at Trump's first prime-time 2024 campaign rally on January 28, 2023, and told Fox News host Sean Hannity that he would support Trump "because I know what I'm going to get", mostly regarding perceived international threats. Graham campaigned and publicly advocated for Trump on news programs like Meet the Press throughout the 2024 election. He also called on other prominent Republican politicians to campaign for Trump.

In May 2024, when asked whether he would accept the results of the presidential election, Graham said he would "if there's no massive cheating".

In July 2024, after President Biden announced he would not seek reelection, Graham said he wished Biden well and that he "appreciate[d] his lifelong service to our nation".

In September 2024, with growing concern about a tie in the Electoral College, Graham visited Nebraska—one of two states without a winner-take-all vote allocation system. He lobbied Governor Jim Pillen to call a special session of the legislature to adopt the winner-take-all system, preventing Kamala Harris from receiving the state's one Electoral College vote typically won by Democrats. Trump endorsed the change. The move failed when too few state senators agreed to call a special session.

In October 2024, Graham said Republican voters who supported Harris were supporting "the most radical nominee in history of American politics". He argued that the Biden-Harris immigration policy was a larger "danger to this country" than Trump's rhetoric.

Graham called Trump's 2024 election victory "the biggest comeback in American history".

== Political positions ==
Graham was a neoconservative. Tea Party opponents called Graham a "moderate Republican". He called himself a "Reagan-style Republican", and was called a fairly conservative Republican with "a twang of moderation" and "an independent streak". Trump said at his funeral: "He was extremely hawkish. I will tell you, he never saw a war that he didn't like".

Much of the Tea Party criticism concerned his willingness to be bipartisan and work with Democrats on issues like climate change, tax reform, and immigration reform and his belief that judicial nominees should not be opposed solely because of their philosophical positions. He voted to confirm both of President Obama's Supreme Court nominees, Sonia Sotomayor in 2009 and Elena Kagan in 2010. Graham criticized and confronted the Tea Party, arguing for a more inclusive Republican Party. In 2023, the Lugar Center ranked Graham in the top third of senators for bipartisanship.

=== Supreme Court nominations ===
Graham was notable for his support for Supreme Court Associate Justice Brett Kavanaugh during his confirmation process in 2018 and his defense against the sexual assault allegations against him

In 2016, after Supreme Court Justice Antonin Scalia died, Republican senators boycotted Obama's nomination of Merrick Garland. Graham said that Supreme Court vacancies should never be filled in a presidential election year and that "[w]e are setting a precedent today, Republicans are." He said that if a similar situation arose, "you can use my words against me and you'd be absolutely right." In an October 2018 interview, Graham said specifically that "[i]f an opening comes in the last year of President Trump's term, and the primary process has started, we'll wait till the next election."

During the 2018 confirmation hearings following Brett Kavanaugh's nomination to the Supreme Court of the United States, Graham took a strong stance against letting the process be further delayed by Christine Blasey Ford's allegations that Kavanaugh sexually assaulted her decades earlier when the two were in high school. Speaking to reporters immediately after the Senate Judiciary Committee questioned Ford, Graham declared himself unmoved by her testimony, doubting her recollection that it was Kavanaugh who had assaulted her.

When Kavanaugh testified before the committee the following day, Graham used his time to speak in Kavanaugh's defense, describing him as a victim who had been put through "hell" by "the most unethical sham" he had seen in his time in politics and that if Kavanaugh was looking for fair process, he had come "to the wrong town at the wrong time".

In 2019, Graham became chair of the Judiciary Committee. In May 2020, Graham said the Senate would work to confirm a Supreme Court nominee if a vacancy arose before the November election. He said "Merrick Garland was a different situation. You had the president of one party nominating, and you had the Senate in the hands of the other party. A situation where you've got them both would be different." In August 2020, he said, "After Kavanaugh's confirmation, the rules have changed as far as I'm concerned."

On September 18, 2020, 45 days before the presidential election, Supreme Court justice Ruth Bader Ginsburg died. Within a day, Graham expressed support for the Senate immediately voting on Trump's nominee to succeed her. The New York Times called Graham's position "a complete and brazen reversal" of his earlier stance. Graham said that in 2013, years before his 2016 pledge, Democrats had changed Senate rules to allow a simple majority vote for nominees to United States courts of appeals.

=== Free speech ===
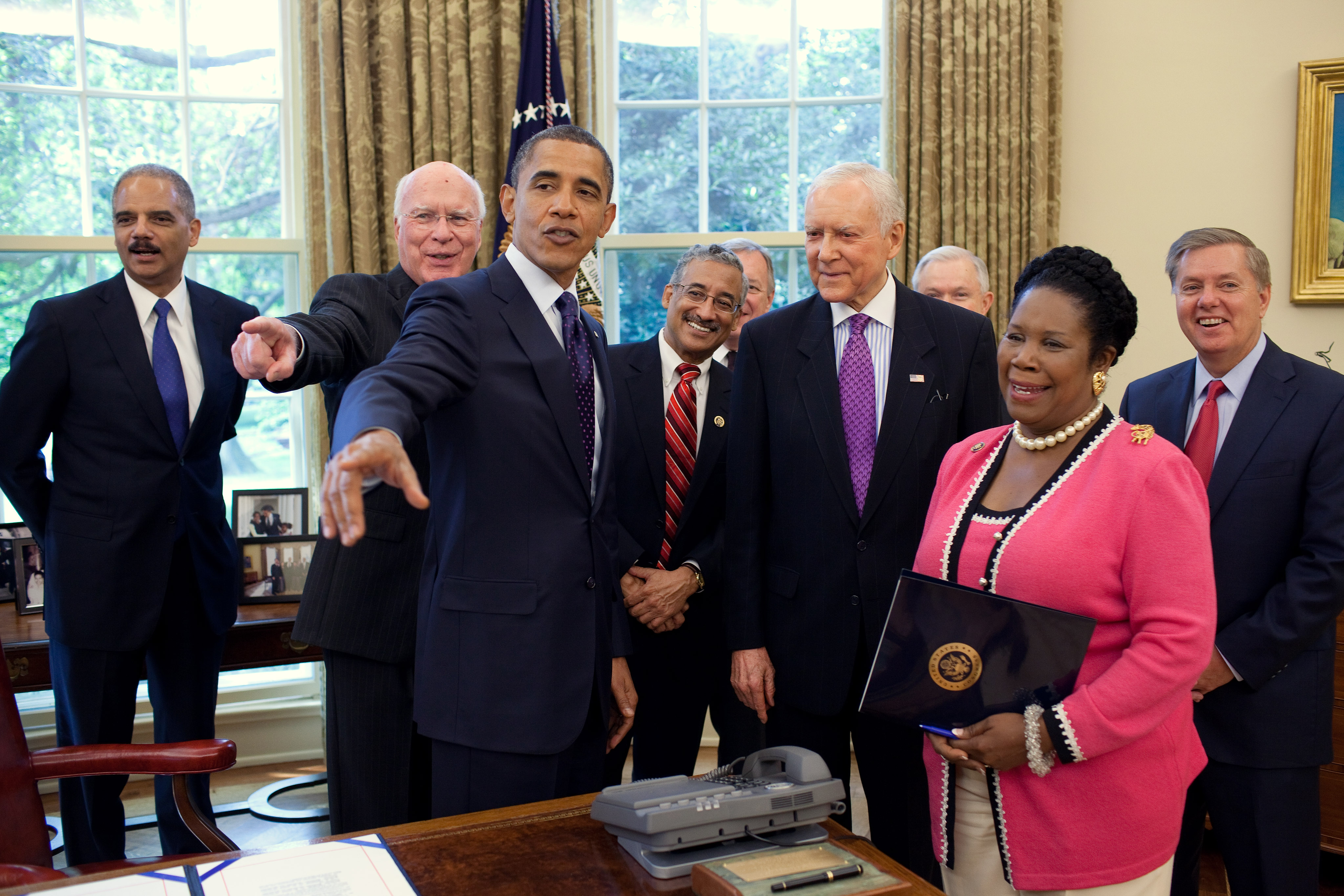
Graham (far right) at the signing of the Fair Sentencing Act in 2010

During an April 3, 2011, appearance on Face the Nation, Graham "suggested that Congress take unspecified though formal action against the Koran-burning by Florida preacher Terry Jones", in light of an attack on United Nations personnel triggered by Jones's actions. Asserting that "Congress might need to explore the need to limit some forms of freedom of speech", Graham argued, "Free speech is a great idea, but we're in a war," and claimed that "during World War II, we had limits on what you could say if it would inspire the enemy."

=== Gang of 14 ===
On May 23, 2005, Graham was one of the so-called Gang of 14 senators forging a compromise that brought a halt to the continued blockage of an up-or-down vote on judicial nominees. This compromise negated both the Democrats' use of a filibuster and the Republican "nuclear option". Under the agreement, the Democrats retained the power to filibuster a Bush judicial nominee only in an "extraordinary circumstance", and subsequently, three conservative Bush appellate court nominees (Janice Rogers Brown, Priscilla Owen, and William H. Pryor Jr.) received a vote by the full Senate.

=== National Security Agency surveillance ===
In response to the 2013 disclosures about the United States National Security Agency and its international partners' global surveillance of foreign nationals and U.S. citizens, Graham said he was "glad" the NSA was collecting phone records. He said, "I'm a Verizon customer. I don't mind Verizon turning over records to the government if the government is going to make sure that they try to match up a known terrorist phone with somebody in the United States. I don't think you're talking to the terrorists. I know you're not. I know I'm not. So we don't have anything to worry about."

On July 25, 2013, the U.S. Senate Committee on Appropriations unanimously adopted an amendment by Graham to the Fiscal Year 2014 Department of State, Foreign Operations, and Related Programs Appropriations Bill that sought sanctions against any country that offered asylum to former NSA contractor Edward Snowden.

=== Detainee interrogations ===
In July 2005, Graham secured the declassification and release of memoranda outlining concerns made by senior military lawyers as early as 2003 about the legality of the interrogations of prisoners held at Guantanamo Bay.

Of U.S. citizens accused of supporting terrorism, Graham said before the Senate, "When they say, 'I want my lawyer,' you tell them, 'Shut up. You don't get a lawyer. You are an enemy combatant, and we are going to talk to you about why you joined Al Qaeda.'" In response to this and a June 2004 United States Supreme Court decision allowing detainees to file habeas corpus petitions to challenge their detentions, Graham authored an amendment to a Department of Defense Authorization Act attempting to clarify the authority of American courts. The amendment passed in November 2005 by a vote of 49–42 in the Senate despite opposition from human rights groups and legal scholars who contended that it limited the rights of detainees.

Graham said he amended the Department of Defense Authorization Act in order to give military lawyers, as opposed to politically appointed lawyers, a more independent role in the oversight of military commanders. He argued that two of the largest problems leading to the detainee abuse scandals at Guantanamo Bay and Abu Ghraib were this lack of oversight and troops' confusion over legal boundaries.

Graham added that military lawyers had long observed the provisions of the Uniform Code of Military Justice and the Geneva Convention, but that the George W. Bush administration had not considered those provisions in decisions about the treatment of Guantanamo Bay detainees. He claimed that better legal oversight within the military's chain of command would prevent future detainee abuse.

In February 2006, Graham joined Senator Jon Kyl in filing an amicus brief in the Hamdan v. Rumsfeld case that argued "Congress was aware" that the Detainee Treatment Act of 2005 would strip the Supreme Court of jurisdiction to hear "pending cases, including this case" brought by Guantanamo detainees.

In a May 2009 CNN interview, Graham referred to the domestic internment of German and Japanese prisoners of war and U.S. citizens as a model for domestic detention of Guantanamo detainees, saying, "We had 450,000 Japanese and German prisoners housed in the United States during World War II. As a nation, we can deal with this."

=== Immigration reform ===
Graham was a supporter of "comprehensive immigration reform", of S. 2611, the McCain-Kennedy Immigration Reform Bill of 2006, and of S. 1348, the Comprehensive Immigration Reform Act of 2007. His positions on immigration, and in particular collaborating with Senator Ted Kennedy, earned Graham the ire of conservative activists. The controversy prompted conservative activists to support a primary challenge in 2008 by longtime Republican national committeeman Buddy Witherspoon, but Graham won the nomination by a large margin.

In early 2010, Graham began working with Democratic New York senator Chuck Schumer on immigration reform. Their talks on the matter broke down later that year.

In July 2010, Graham suggested that U.S. citizenship as a birthright guaranteed by the 14th Amendment of the U.S. Constitution should be amended, and that any children born to illegal immigrants in the United States should be considered illegal immigrants. He alleged, "Half the children born in hospitals on our borders are the children of illegal immigrants."

In November 2012, Graham and Schumer resumed their talks on comprehensive immigration reform. On January 28, 2013, Graham was a member of a bipartisan group of eight senators that announced principles for comprehensive immigration reform. On June 23, 2013, Graham said that the Senate was close to obtaining 70 votes to pass the reform package.

In May 2019, Graham proposed instituting new immigration laws that would only allow migrants to apply for asylum from their home country or Mexico, smooth the process to deport unaccompanied children to Central America, and extend the period by which migrant children could be detained from 20 days to 100 days.

In July 2019, Graham visited a migrant detention center in Texas. He reacted that it was not "a concentration camp" but "a facility overwhelmed". Of the migrants, Graham said, "I don't care if they have to stay in these facilities for 400 days. We're not going to let those men go that I saw. It would be dangerous."

=== Internet and technology ===
In May 2018, Graham voted against legislation that would have overturned an FCC ruling and restored net neutrality.

In March 2017, Graham voted for the Broadband Consumer Privacy Proposal that removed the FCC's internet privacy rules and allowed internet service providers to sell customers' browsing history without their permission.

In February 2022, Graham and Richard Blumenthal introduced bipartisan legislation, as part of the EARN IT Act, to incentivize tech companies to remove child sexual abuse material (CSAM) from their platforms and remove blanket immunity for violations of laws related to online child pornography.

=== Gun issues ===
Graham opposed extending background checks. He said, "universal background checks are going to require universal [gun] registration." He called current gun laws "broken", citing an example of a woman who pleaded guilty by reason of insanity to attempting to kill President George W. Bush, but was later able to pass a background check and buy a gun. To this end, in March 2013, he joined senators Jeff Flake, Mark Begich, and Mark Pryor in introducing a bill that would close a loophole by flagging people who attempt to buy guns who have used an insanity defense, were ruled dangerous by a court or had been committed by a court to mental health treatment. It did not address the gun show loophole.

In 2022, Graham became one of ten Republican senators to support a bipartisan agreement on gun control, which included a red flag provision, a support for state crisis intervention orders, funding for school safety resources, stronger background checks for buyers under the age of 21, and penalties for straw purchases.

=== Healthcare ===
Graham opposed President Barack Obama's health reform legislation; he voted against the Affordable Care Act (Obamacare) in December 2009, and against the Health Care and Education Reconciliation Act of 2010. He played a leading role in efforts to repeal Obamacare, authoring the Graham–Cassidy amendment to Republicans' 2017 repeal efforts. The amendment would have given states permission to remove protections for individuals with preexisting conditions, such as allowing insurers to charge them higher prices for insurance.

=== Vaccines ===
Graham criticized Senator Rand Paul after Paul said, "I've heard of many tragic cases of walking, talking, normal children who wound up with profound mental disorders after vaccines." Graham said that Paul was "creating anxiety for no good reason" and "looking at this issue through a libertarian's eyes, not a physician's eyes".

=== Abortion ===
In 2015, Graham sponsored the Pain-Capable Unborn Child Protection Act in the Senate, which bans abortion after 20 weeks of gestation on a national basis, with some exceptions (to save the life of the mother, or when the pregnancy is the result of rape or incest). In 2018, Graham was anti-abortion, but said that Roe v. Wade is precedent that should not be overturned without good reason. In 2020, he was one of 13 Republican senators who declined to sign an amicus brief asking the Supreme Court to overturn Roe.

In May 2022, Graham advocated that the Supreme Court overturn Roe to ensure that "every state will decide if abortion is legal and on what terms", as this would be "the most constitutionally sound way of dealing with this issue and the way the United States handled the issue until 1973." In June 2022, he asserted that all conservatives "believed that there's nothing in the Constitution giving the federal government the right to regulate abortion". In August 2022, Graham said that "states should decide the issue of abortion" and that he had "been consistent" on this.

After previously saying that abortion should be left up to the states, in September 2022 Graham introduced legislation to institute a federal ban on abortion after 15 weeks of pregnancy with exceptions for rape, incest, and the life of the patient. He said: "This is not a states' rights issue. This is a human right issue [...] I am going to advocate a national minimum standard." His proposed legislation would force states to ban abortion after 15 weeks, but it would not require states to allow it up to that point.

=== Animal welfare ===
Graham received high marks from national animal-protection organizations. In the first session of the 119th Congress, the Humane World Action Fund awarded him a score of 100 on its 2025 Humane Scorecard and designated him a "leader", which indicates participation in actions such as leading "on multiple legislative and/or regulatory efforts" the Humane World Action Fund supports.

Graham was a prominent Republican supporter of efforts to end horse slaughter. In 2025, he co-sponsored the bipartisan Save America's Forgotten Equines (SAFE) Act, which would prohibit commercial slaughter of horses for human consumption and end the export of American horses to foreign slaughter facilities.

=== LGBT issues ===
In 1996, Graham voted for the Defense of Marriage Act, which became federal law that year; it defined marriage as between one man and one woman, and enacted non-recognition of same-sex marriages at the federal level. Graham reiterated his support of the Defense of Marriage Act in 2022.

Graham voted to support Federal Marriage Amendment in 2006, which would have defined marriage as a union of one man and one woman, as well as prevented judicial extension of marriage rights to same-sex couples. He said, "I believe in the traditional definition of marriage as being between one man and one woman. Traditional marriage is an institution worth protecting and this amendment will accomplish that goal. A constitutional amendment is the only effective way to cut off the growing trend among judges to create a constitutional right to same-sex marriage." After the Supreme Court ruling in Obergefell v. Hodges, Graham said that although he disagreed with the ruling, he no longer believed that a constitutional amendment was a viable action on the issue.

In November 2022, Graham voted against the Respect for Marriage Act, which provides federal recognition for same-sex marriages in the United States. Graham said in August that, "states should decide the issue of marriage [...] if you're going to ask me to have the federal government take over defining marriage, I'm going to say no".

=== Climate change ===
On December 10, 2009, Graham and senators John Kerry and Joe Lieberman co-sponsored a letter to President Barack Obama announcing their commitment to passing a climate change bill and outlining its framework. Graham was identified as a potential Republican supporter of a climate change bill and thought to be a likely sponsor of the final bill, but he pulled his support, saying that he disapproved of Senate Democrats moving forward with legislation to deal with immigration issues, a reaction to Arizona's passage of an illegal immigration law. Graham's withdrawal of support left passage of the climate change bill in doubt.

In June 2010, Graham told reporters, "The science about global warming has changed. I think they've oversold this stuff, quite frankly. I think they've been alarmist and the science is in question. The whole movement has taken a giant step backward." He also said that he planned to vote against the climate bill he had originally co-sponsored, citing further restriction of offshore drilling added to the bill and its impact on transportation. In 2015, Graham said he "completely understand[s] and accept[s]" that climate change is real, but said "I don't know" the role human activity played.

In 2020, Graham sponsored the Growing Climate Solutions Act, a bill that would make it simpler for farmers to sell carbon credits on existing carbon trading markets in California and in the Northeast.

In November 2023, Graham and Bill Cassidy co-sponsored the Foreign Pollution Fee Act. Endorsed by the Sierra Club, the bill (S. 3198; referred to the Senate Finance Committee) proposed imposing a carbon tariff on energy and industrial imports based on the good's emission intensity or carbon footprint as compared with the same domestic good to impose a carbon price on goods from countries with greater greenhouse gas emissions than the United States.

=== Foreign policy ===
Graham supported an interventionist foreign policy. In 2002, he voted for the Iraq Resolution, which authorized military action against Iraq. He also supported the invasion of Iraq. Graham and senators John McCain and Joe Lieberman, who were frequently dubbed "the three amigos", traveled widely, pushing for United States military intervention, particularly after the September 11 attacks. Their influence reached its zenith in 2007 as President George W. Bush advocated for his surge strategy in Iraq and then diminished shortly before Lieberman retired from the Senate in 2013. Kelly Ayotte, who joined the Senate in 2011, was considered Lieberman's replacement in the group.

Graham was a frequent critic of the foreign policy of the Barack Obama administration. He threatened to derail the confirmation of Obama's nominee for United States secretary of defense, Republican former senator Chuck Hagel, a centrist. Graham remarked that Hagel "would be the most antagonistic secretary of defense towards the state of Israel in our nation's history."

On February 28, 2013, Graham criticized Obama and both political parties on the Senate floor for allowing the budget reduction to occur with "two-thirds of the budget" exempt from reductions. Quoting Defense Secretary Leon Panetta, he agreed that the impact on the Department of Defense would create a "hollow military" that "invites aggression".

==== War in Afghanistan ====
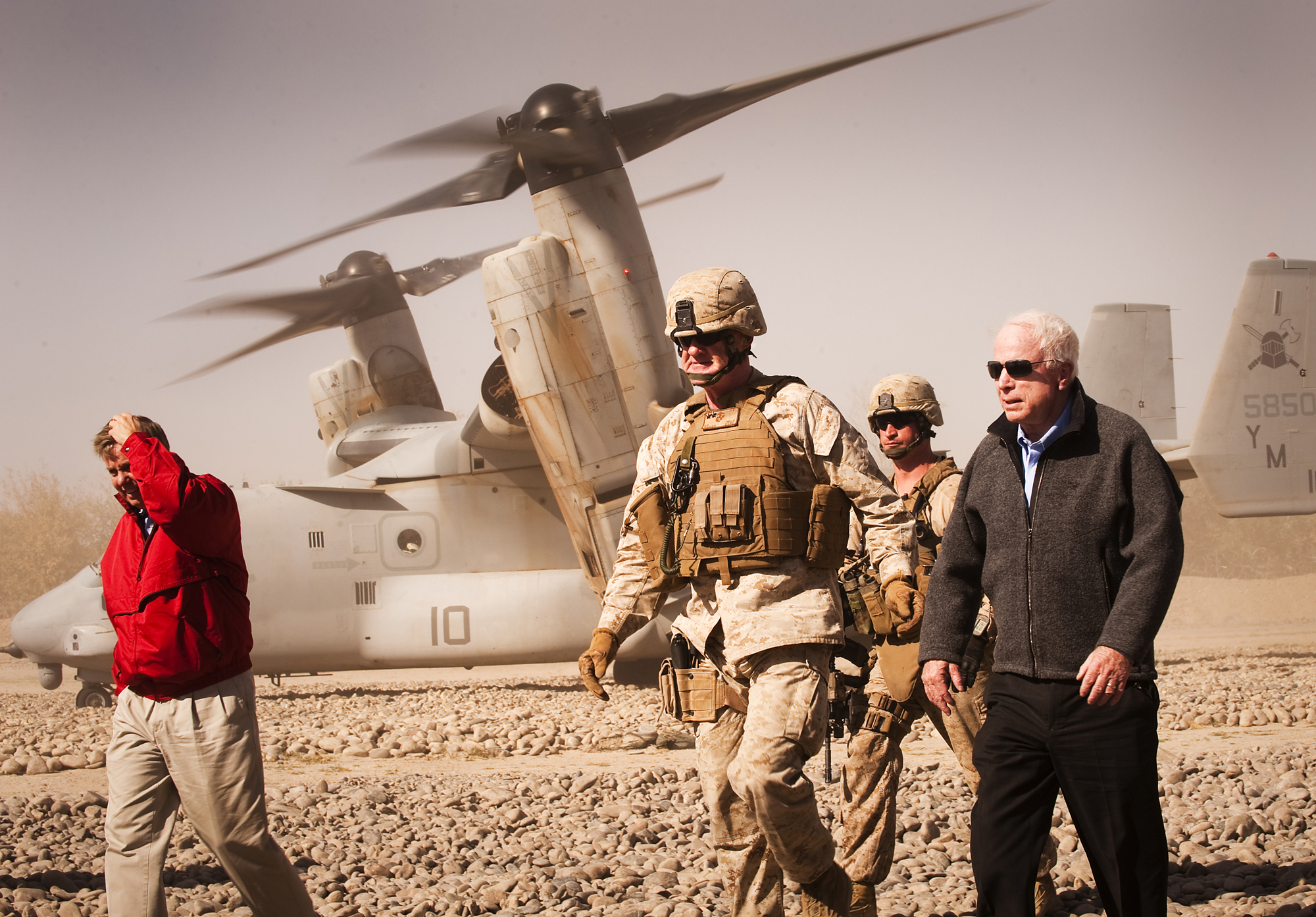
Graham with John McCain and Lt. Gen. Richard P. Mills in Afghanistan in 2010

Graham suggested that the U.S. should stay in Afghanistan permanently, claiming that this would benefit both nations, as the U.S. would maintain a clear picture of what was happening in the region, and Afghan security forces would have a military advantage that would ensure Afghanistan never fell back into the hands of the Taliban. He further claimed that Afghan leaders accepted this long-term U.S. military presence since it benefited them, but that Iran and some of its allies opposed it, which was considered a debatable claim.

External videos
- "Senator Graham on President Biden's Afghanistan Strategy" on C-SPAN

Graham vehemently opposed President Joe Biden's decision to withdraw all U.S. troops from Afghanistan, originally agreed to by the first Trump administration. He predicted that the decision would put the U.S. in danger and could cause "another 9/11". Soon after the withdrawal started, the Taliban launched an offensive against the Afghan government, quickly advancing in front of the collapsing Afghan Armed Forces. On July 8, 2021, Graham called Biden's decision a "disaster in the making".

==== Iran ====
On November 6, 2010, Graham called for a preemptive military strike to weaken the government of Iran. In 2011, he supported a continuing U.S. military presence in Iraq, saying, "If we're not smart enough to work with the Iraqis to have 10,000 to 15,000 American troops in Iraq in 2012, Iraq could go to hell."

On an episode of Fox and Friends, Graham joked that it would be "terrible" if a DNA test showed he had Iranian ancestry. Co-host Brian Kilmeade responded, "Well, they have great people, just bad leaders," and Graham agreed. The president of the National Iranian American Council and a number of high-profile Iranian-Americans criticized Graham's comments. Graham has never apologized for his comments.

During the Gaza war, Graham called for the U.S. to threaten Iran's oil infrastructure if the conflict escalated. In a CNN interview, he called for the U.S. and Israel to bomb Iran even if it was not involved in Hamas's attack on Israel. He also said the U.S. would win a war with Iran if it broke out.

In January 2026, during the 2025–2026 Iranian protests, Graham expressed support and wore a "Make Iran Great Again" hat. The same month, he compared Iran's Supreme Leader, Ayatollah Ali Khamenei, to Adolf Hitler, and urged Trump to kill him. He supported the 2026 Iran war, claiming that he would support Israel "until my dying day" and that he would convince South Carolinians to send their children to the Middle East for war against Iran. Because of NATO's refusal to support the United States and Israel against Iran, Graham said he was disgruntled about the alliance and that he would "never look at Europe the same".

After the 2026 Iran war ceasefire was extended, Graham praised the decision to leave the naval blockade in place, saying it would put pressure on the Iranian government. He also set out strict conditions for any potential agreement with Iran.

==== Russia ====
In December 2010, Graham was one of 26 senators to vote against the ratification of New START, a nuclear arms reduction treaty between the U.S. and the Russian Federation obliging both countries to have no more than 1,550 strategic warheads or 700 launchers deployed during the next seven years along with providing a continuation of on-site inspections that halted when START I expired the previous year. It was the first arms treaty with Russia in eight years.

In August 2011, Graham co-sponsored a resolution supporting Georgia, writing in a statement, "Russia's invasion of Georgian land in 2008 was an act of aggression, not only to Georgia but to all new democracies."

On July 16, 2013, Graham suggested the United States should consider boycotting the 2014 Winter Olympics in Sochi, Russia, because of "what the Russian government is doing throughout the world".

==== Ukraine ====
Graham met President Leonid Kuchma at his dacha in Crimea in 2004. It was his first time visiting Ukraine. Senator John McCain was also part of the United States delegation.

==== Russo-Ukrainian war ====
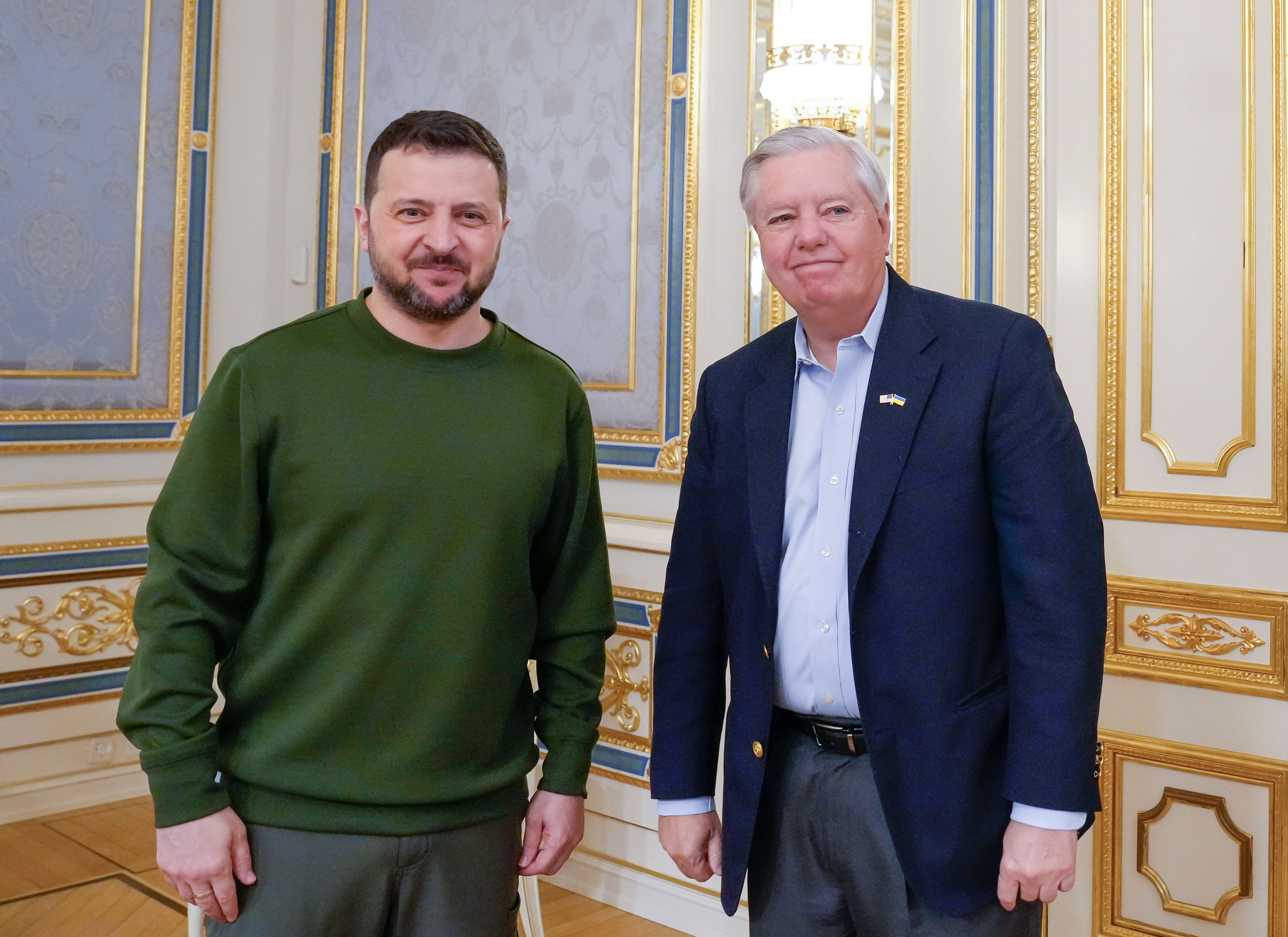
Graham with Ukrainian president Volodymyr Zelenskyy, March 18, 2024

On March 3, 2022, in response to the Russian invasion of Ukraine, Graham tweeted, "The only way this ends is for somebody in Russia to take this guy out", referring to Russian president Vladimir Putin. The tweet, which was viewed as suggesting that a Russian resident should assassinate Putin, drew backlash from United States politicians, who condemned the idea and proposed heavier sanctions instead.

On May 26, 2023, the Office of the President of Ukraine released an edited video showing Graham talking to Ukrainian president Volodymyr Zelenskyy and remarking that "the Russians are dying", followed by a comment that the American military assistance to Ukraine was the "best money we've ever spent". In response, Graham was sharply criticized by the deputy chairman of the Security Council of Russia, Dmitry Medvedev. The Office of the president of Ukraine later released the unedited version of the interview, clarifying that Graham's two remarks were unrelated.

On May 29, 2023, the Russian Interior Ministry issued an arrest warrant for Graham for his comments about the war. In response, Graham tweeted that the news brought him "immense joy" and that he would "wear the arrest warrant issued by Putin's corrupt and immoral government as a Badge of Honor". In a follow-up tweet, Graham added that he would submit to the jurisdiction of the International Criminal Court (ICC) should Russia attempt to serve the warrant.

On February 13, 2024, Graham voted against the Ukraine, Israel, and Taiwan appropriations bill because it included an effort by senators James Lankford, Kyrsten Sinema, and Chuck Schumer to control the Mexico–United States border. In April, the House returned the appropriations as four separate bills. Graham joined 79 colleagues and the majority of his caucus in passing the appropriations, which Schumer packaged as one bill.

In 2025, Graham authored and championed the Sanctioning Russia Act, legislation that would impose secondary sanctions on Russia, including 500% tariffs on countries that buy Russian oil, natural gas, uranium, and other exports.

==== India ====
In late August 2025, Graham claimed that the Trump administration's 50% tariff on Indian imports over Russian oil purchases played a key role in bringing Putin to the negotiating table, culminating in the 2025 Russia–United States summit. He said that targeting Russia's customers would force them to choose the U.S. economy over Russian energy and argued that losing major buyers like India would pressure Russia economically, framing the tariff as a strategic move. Economist Jeffrey Sachs sharply criticized Graham, calling him "the worst senator in the U.S." and a "fool", arguing that the tariffs had the opposite effect—unifying BRICS countries and undermining U.S. strategic interests.

==== Libya ====
Graham supported the NATO-led military intervention in Libya. On January 29, 2013, Graham said that Secretary of State Hillary Clinton "got away with murder" after her testimony about the 2012 Benghazi attack, but the next year he said that the House Intelligence Committee report on Benghazi was "full of crap" and that the Obama administration had been cleared of many of the charges therein.

==== Israel–Palestine ====
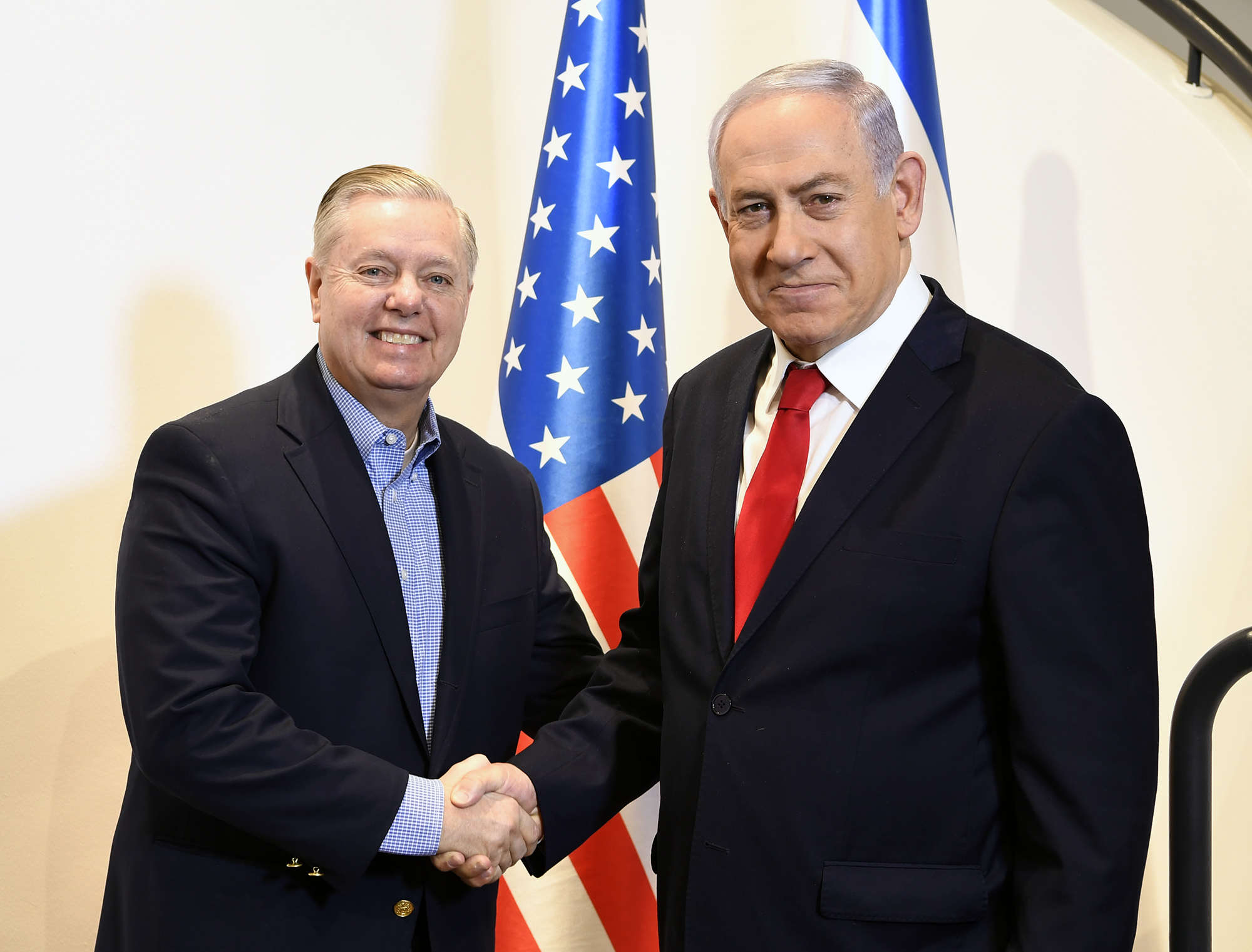
Graham with Israeli prime minister Benyamin Netanyahu on March 15, 2019

On January 5, 2017, Graham condemned Obama for abstaining from UN Security Council Resolution 2334, which condemned Israeli settlement building in the West Bank and eastern Jerusalem as a violation of international law.

On March 11, 2019, Graham said he would encourage the Trump administration to recognize the Golan Heights, which is internationally recognized as part of Syria, as part of Israel.

After the 2021 Israel–Palestine crisis, Graham visited Israel to meet Israeli prime minister Benjamin Netanyahu to secure an additional $1 billion of military aid to the country.

On October 10, 2023, Graham tweeted that he "unapologetically stand[s] with Israel" during the Gaza war. He called the conflict a "religious war" and said that Gaza should be "flattened". On October 31, 2023, Graham said that no amount of civilian casualties in Gaza would lead him to question Israel's goal of eradicating Hamas.

On March 9, 2024, Graham said, "For decades now, Palestinian children have been taught through UNRWA and other agencies to kill all the Jews" and "somebody needs to pull the Palestinian school system up by its roots and destroy it."

On May 1, 2024, Graham participated in a conference call between U.S. senators and Karim Ahmad Khan, the Prosecutor of the International Criminal Court. Khan told investigators that when discussing potential arrest warrants for Israeli leaders, Graham said: "You may as well shoot the hostages yourself. This court is for Africans." A spokesperson for Graham denied that he said the latter sentence, claiming instead that he said the court's jurisdiction extends only to places where the rule of law has collapsed.

On May 8, 2024, Graham warned the Pentagon against halting arms supply to Israel during the Gaza war, saying, "Give Israel what they need to fight the war they can't afford to lose. This is Hiroshima and Nagasaki on steroids." This statement caused a debate in the Japanese National Diet. Taku Yamazoe and Jin Matsubara protested to Foreign Minister Yōko Kamikawa. Matsubara said, "The US is Japan's greatest ally, but the Japanese should be firm with the US on lines that they cannot cross." Kamikawa told the parliamentary committee, "The atomic bombings took many precious lives and forced people to face unspeakable hardships such as illnesses and disabilities, creating a situation that is extremely regrettable from a humanitarian point of view." She emphasized that the use of nuclear weapons is "not consistent with the spirit of humanitarianism because of their tremendously destructive and lethal power." On May 14, Kamikawa called Graham's remarks "extremely regrettable". Nihon Hidankyō sent a letter of protest to the U.S. Embassy in Japan that said: "This statement is also in violation of international humanitarian law. With the Nuclear Weapons Convention now in effect, it can only be called an anachronistic and malicious delusion".

On May 10, Graham said that he trusts Israel more than he does U.S. Secretary of Defense Lloyd Austin.

On May 11, Graham and 11 other Republican senators introduced a resolution condemning the Biden administration's actions to withhold or restrict ammunition and weapons to Israel.

In a May 12 interview, Graham again defended bombing Hiroshima and Nagasaki to end World War II and said, "Give Israel the bombs they need to end the war. They can't afford to lose." This statement attracted international attention. The Independent, Al Jazeera, and India Today reported that Graham suggested that a nuclear strike on Gaza should be carried out. The South China Morning Post columnist Alex Lo wrote that the American ruling elite is becoming unhinged, bringing up one American genocide after another to justify the Israeli genocide. Hamas issued a statement on the remarks referring to Graham's "deep moral decline and the genocide and colonialism mentality that he harbors" and calling him "among the U.S. political elite, who align themselves with a full-fledged genocidal crime committed by the amoral Israeli army against isolated civilians". Iranian Foreign Ministry spokesman Nasser Kanaani said, "These horrible statements by an American senator in justifying and encouraging the use of nuclear bombs by the Zionist regime reflect the brutality of those who advocate war and disregard human rights and international resolutions."

On May 20, in response to ICC Chief Prosecutor Karim Khan's announcement of his intention to seek arrest warrants of senior Israeli officials in connection to their alleged responsibility in the war crimes in the Gaza war, Graham called for sanctions to be placed on the ICC and said: "This outrageous decision is truly a slap in the face to the independent judiciary of Israel, which is renowned for their independence." He added, "If they do this to Israel, we're next".

On May 29, Graham met with Netanyahu and called International Court of Justice (ICJ) President Nawaf Salam a "raving antisemite". Graham visited Israel five times after the Hamas attack on October 7, and Netanyahu said he had no better friend for Israel than Graham.

On July 5, Graham said, "The Palestinians in Gaza are the most radicalized population on the planet, who are taught to hate Jews from birth". CAIR issued a statement condemning his remark.

On November 23, Graham argued that, in response to the ICC arrest warrants for Netanyahu and Gallant, allied countries such as Canada, the UK, Germany, and France should be sanctioned if they assist the ICC.

On June 1, 2025, in response to Greta Thunberg traveling on a ship bringing humanitarian aid to Gaza, Graham tweeted: "Hope Greta and her friends can swim!" At an August 2025 South Carolina Republican Party meeting, he said, "if America pulls the plug on Israel, God will pull the plug on us".

In 2026, Graham coached Israeli Prime Minister Benjamin Netanyahu on how to convince President Trump to begin bombing Iran.

==== Venezuela ====
In May 2019, Graham called for a military invasion of Venezuela to overthrow Nicolás Maduro amid the 2019 Venezuelan presidential crisis.

==== Niger ====
In October 2017, in the wake of the Tongo Tongo ambush, which killed four United States soldiers, Graham said, "I didn't know there was a thousand troops in Niger." A few days later, he called for an expanded role of the United States military in Niger: "You're going to see more actions in Africa, not less; you're going to see more aggression by the United States toward our enemies, not less; you're going to have decisions being made not in the White House but out in the field."

==== Syria ====
In July 2018, Graham and Senator Jeanne Shaheen visited Manbij in Syria and met the Manbij Military Council, which led an offensive to liberate the city from ISIS in 2016 with help from the United States-led coalition.

In January 2026, just months after the Caesar Act had been revoked, Graham repeatedly vowed to introduce the Save the Kurds Act and reimpose "crippling sanctions" on the Syrian transitional government and its allies after its offensive against Kurdish areas in Rojava, in order to "prevent a bloodbath [...] against [the United States'] Kurdish allies". In July 2026, Graham met with Syrian president Ahmed al-Sharaa, supporting him for his role in curbing Iranian influence in his country and urging more positive reassessments of Syria.

==== Saudi Arabia ====
In March 2015, Graham supported the Saudi Arabian-led intervention in Yemen, saying, "We want to have a relationship with Saudi Arabia. They're a strategic partner. They're a mortal enemy of the Iranians." In June 2019, he was one of seven Republicans to vote to block Trump's Saudi arms deal providing weapons to Saudi Arabia, the United Arab Emirates and Jordan, and one of five Republicans to vote against an additional 20 arms sales. In late 2019, Graham took a warmer approach toward Saudi Arabia. He praised the Trump administration for sending thousands of additional troops to Saudi Arabia to counter Iran's threat. He also praised Saudi Arabia for opening its airspace to Israeli flights.

==== Turkey ====
In October 2019, Graham said he would "introduce bipartisan sanctions against Turkey if they invade Syria" and that he would "call for their suspension from NATO if they attack Kurdish forces who assisted the United States in the destruction of the ISIS Caliphate."

==== Cuba ====
During the 2026 Cuban crisis, Graham said that Cuba's leadership was increasingly vulnerable and that "this communist dictatorship in Cuba [...] their days are numbered".

==== Greenland ====
In 2026, Graham expressed support for the annexation of Greenland and criticized Europeans as weak. He later expressed indifference to Europeans' fears about Trump's threats to annex Greenland.

==== Armenian genocide ====
In November 2019, Graham blocked a Senate resolution to officially recognize the Armenian genocide. In December 2019, he voted for the resolution, which passed the Senate unanimously.

=== Mueller investigation ===
In January 2018, and in the first known congressional criminal referral in the investigation into Russian interference in the 2016 election, Graham and Chuck Grassley recommended charges against ex-MI6 officer Christopher Steele, named as author of the Steele dossier. Grassley and Graham said that they had reason to believe that Steele had lied to federal authorities. According to The New York Times, "It was not clear why, if a crime is apparent in the F.B.I. reports that were reviewed by the Judiciary Committee, the Justice Department had not moved to charge Mr. Steele already. The circumstances under which Mr. Steele is alleged to have lied were unclear, as much of the referral was classified."

In April 2018, after the FBI raid on the hotel room and offices of Trump's personal attorney, Michael Cohen, Graham, Cory Booker, Chris Coons, and Thom Tillis introduced new legislation to "limit President Trump's ability to fire special counsel Robert Mueller." Termed the Special Counsel Independence and Integrity Act, the legislation would allow any special counsel, in this case Mueller, receive an "expedited judicial review" in the 10 days after being dismissed to determine whether the dismissal was appropriate. If not, the special counsel would be reinstated. At the same time, according to The Hill, the bill would "codify regulations" that a special counsel could only be fired by a senior Justice Department official, who would be required to provide reasons in writing.

On March 14, 2019, Graham blocked a resolution calling for Mueller's report to be made public after it passed the House unanimously.

After Mueller's testimony to two congressional committees on July 24, 2019, Graham speculated that "the Mueller report is in name only. It clearly wasn't the Mueller report. It was just in name." On June 25, 2019, Graham said, "The president gave 1.4 million documents to Mueller. [Don] McGahn, his lawyer, testified for 30 hours. He made everybody available to Mueller that Mueller wanted to talk to, and he... answered questions in writing, so this president did nothing to stop Mueller from finding the truth."

=== Taxation ===
Although Graham signed Grover Norquist's Taxpayer Protection Pledge in June 2012, he went on record supporting the closure of tax loopholes without compensating decreases in other tax revenue, saying, "We're so far in debt that if you don't give up some ideological ground, the country sinks."

=== Trade ===
The Cato Institute's Center for Trade Policy Studies identifies Graham, during his U.S. House and U.S. Senate tenure, as having had a mostly protectionist and pro-subsidies voting record.

=== 2015 Charleston church shooting and Confederate flag issue ===
After a mass shooting at a historic African American church in Charleston on June 17, 2015, Graham canceled all campaign events to return to South Carolina. In response to questions from the press regarding the calls from some to remove the Confederate flag at a war memorial on the South Carolina State Capitol grounds, Graham said, "Well, at the end of the day it's time for people in South Carolina to revisit that decision. [That] would be fine with me, but this is part of who we are." He continued, "The flag represents to some people a civil war, and that was the symbol of one side. To others it's a racist symbol, and it's been used by people—it's been used in a racist way." Of the shooter responsible for the incident, Graham said, "We're not going to give this a guy an excuse about a book he might have read, or a movie he watched, or a song he listened to, or a symbol out anywhere. It's him ... not the flag."

In a statement issued later, Graham said, "There can be no doubt that the shooting ... was racially motivated and signals to all of us that the scars of our history are still with us today. This murderer said he wanted to start a race war; he has failed miserably. In Charleston this weekend, I saw a community coming together. I saw people seeking solace in what they share together, not in what makes them different."

=== Fiscal Responsibility Act of 2023 ===
Graham was among the 31 Senate Republicans who voted against final passage of the Fiscal Responsibility Act of 2023.

=== Arctic Frost investigation ===
In October 2025, documents released by Senator Chuck Grassley showed that Graham was among nine Republican lawmakers whose phone metadata the FBI obtained as part of the Arctic Frost investigation into efforts to overturn the 2020 presidential election. The FBI obtained toll records—which include call times, numbers dialed, and duration, but not call content—covering January 4–7, 2021. Graham said that both his personal and government phone records were subpoenaed. After legislation passed allowing senators to sue for damages if their phone records were obtained without notification, Graham announced he would pursue legal action against the Department of Justice, former Special Counsel Jack Smith, and Verizon. He told reporters he intended to seek "far more" than the $500,000 minimum specified in the law, saying he wanted to "make it so painful no one ever does this again".

== Campaign contributions ==
According to a 2013 analysis by the Center for Public Integrity, Graham received about $223,000 in campaign contributions bundled by lobbyists during the 2011–12 election cycle, about 10.3% of his campaign funds. The analysis ranked him as having the second highest proportion of lobbyist-bundled contributions among members of Congress during that period. Graham was not up for reelection until 2014. His bundlers included organizations and lobbyists whose positions Graham endorsed.

In 2016, The Boston Globe reported that Graham was "the only Republican recipient of money from a major Democratic donor now facing scrutiny for some questionable campaign donation habits." The Thornton Law Firm is nationally known for its expertise in asbestos-related litigation. Over a ten-year period, Graham received $62,800 in campaign contributions from the firm's partners. The Boston Globe found that the firm, in almost every case, would reimburse partners' political contributions—in the exact amount—within 10 days of the contributions being made. Between 2010 and 2014, the firm's partners and one of their wives contributed $1.6 million to politicians; $1.4 million was given back to the partners from the firm. The firm told reporters that according to outside consultants the practice was not unlawful because the checks are not bonuses, instead coming out of the partners' firm equity accounts.

A spokesman for Graham said that Graham would return the money he received from the firm's lawyers if the law firm were indicted or convicted on corruption charges.

== 2016 presidential campaign ==
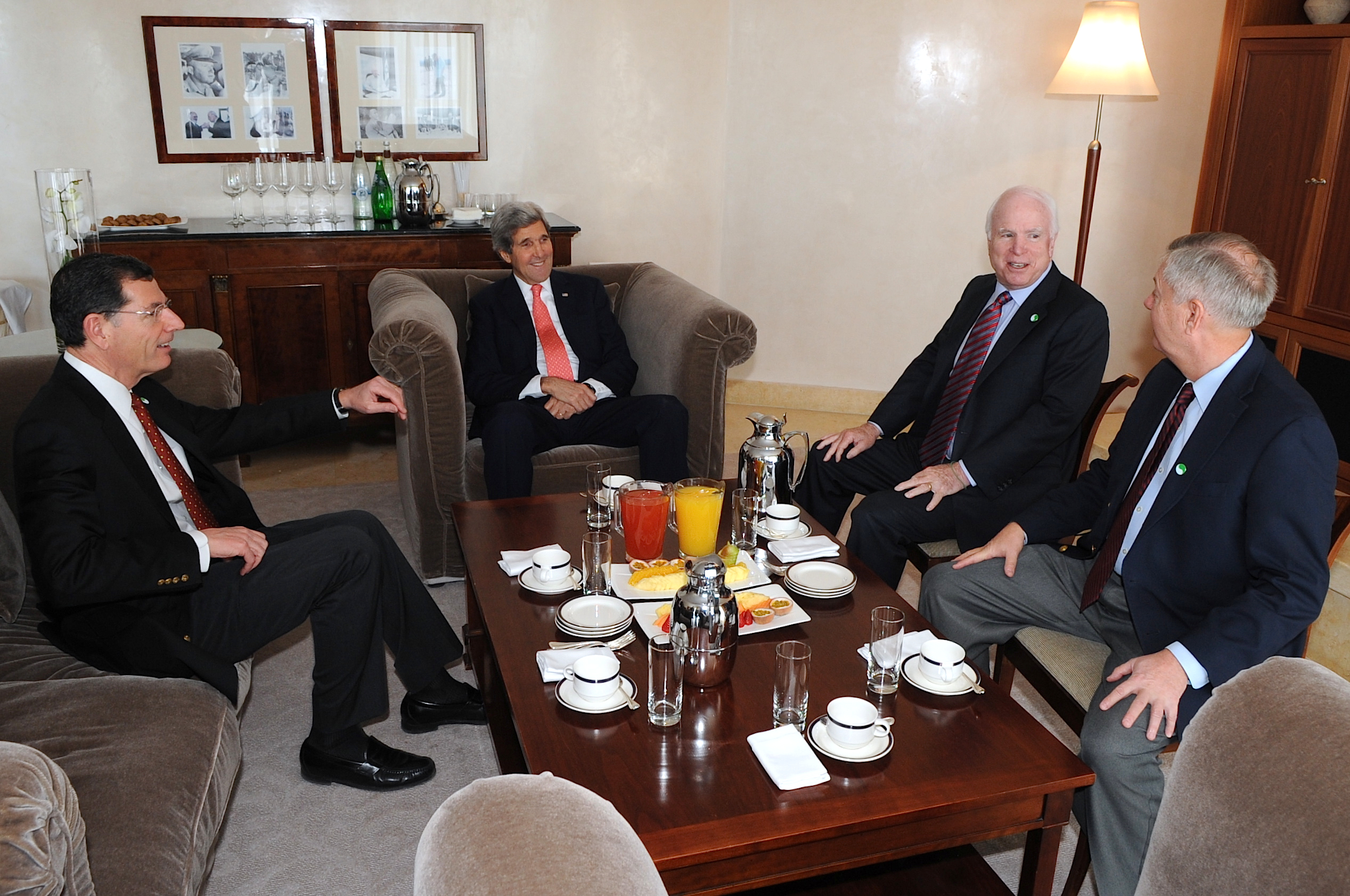
Secretary of State John Kerry meets with senators John McCain, John Barrasso and Lindsey Graham in Jerusalem on January 3, 2014.

Graham supported John McCain for president in 2000 and served as national co-chair of McCain's 2008 presidential campaign.

In 2012, Graham's endorsement was highly sought, but he declined to endorse a Republican candidate before the January South Carolina Republican primary. After Rick Santorum withdrew from the race in April 2012, leaving Mitt Romney as the presumptive nominee, Graham endorsed Romney.

During his Senate reelection race in October 2014, while discussing immigration and foreign policy issues with a reporter from The Weekly Standard, Graham said, "If I get through my general election, if nobody steps up in the presidential mix, if nobody's out there talking ... I may just jump in to get to make these arguments." On March 7, 2015, at a "Politics and Pies" forum, Graham advocated the reversal of defense spending cuts and quipped: "If I were President of the United States, I wouldn't let Congress leave town until we fix this. I would literally use the military to keep them in if I had to."

On April 19, 2015, Graham told Chris Wallace, on the Fox News Sunday show, that he was "91% sure" he would run for president. "If I can raise the money, I'll do it," he said. On May 18, 2015, Graham informally announced that he would run for president on CBS This Morning, saying he was running because he thinks "the world is falling apart."

Graham announced his candidacy for President on June 1, 2015.

Graham sought the Republican presidential nomination in 2016 but withdrew before the primaries began. On December 21, 2015, Graham suspended his presidential campaign, due to lack of support and poor polling, and on January 15, 2016, endorsed former Florida governor Jeb Bush. After it appeared certain that Donald Trump would become the Republican nominee in May 2016, Graham announced that he would not vote for Trump or Hillary Clinton, commenting: "I think Donald Trump is going to places where very few people have gone and I'm not going with him." On November 8, 2016, Graham announced that he had voted for Evan McMullin.

== Electoral history ==
South Carolina's 3rd congressional district: results 1994–2000
Year	Democratic	Votes	Pct	Republican	Votes	Pct	3rd party	Party	Votes	Pct	
1994	James E. Bryan Jr.	59,932	40%	Lindsey Graham	90,123	60%					*
1996	Debbie Dorn	73,417	39%	Lindsey Graham (incumbent)	114,273	60%	Lindal Pennington	Natural Law	1,835	1%	
1998	(no candidate)			Lindsey Graham (incumbent)	129,047	100%	Write-ins		402	<1%	
2000	George Brightharp	67,170	30%	Lindsey Graham (incumbent)	150,180	68%	Adrian Banks	Libertarian	3,116	1%	*

- Write-in and minor candidate notes: In 1994, write-ins received 13 votes. In 2000, Natural Law candidate LeRoy J. Klein received 1,122 votes and write-ins received 33 votes. George Brightharp ran under both the Democratic and United Citizens Parties and received 2,253 votes on the United Citizen line.

Senate elections in South Carolina (Class II): results 2002–2020
Year	Democratic	Votes	Pct	Republican	Votes	Pct	3rd party	Party	Votes	Pct	3rd party	Party	Votes	Pct	
2002	Alex Sanders	487,359	44%	Lindsey Graham	600,010	54%	Ted Adams	Constitution	8,228	1%	Victor Kocher	Libertarian	6,648	1%	*
2008	Bob Conley	785,559	42%	Lindsey Graham (incumbent)	1,069,137	58%	Write-ins		608	<1%					
2014	Brad Hutto	480,933	39%	Lindsey Graham (incumbent)	672,941	54%	Thomas Ravenel	Independent	47,588	4%	Victor Kocher	Libertarian	33,839	3%	*
2020	Jaime Harrison	1,110,828	44%	Lindsey Graham (incumbent)	1,369,137	54%	Bill Bledsoe	Constitution	32,845	1%					

=== Primary elections ===
2008 United States Senate Republican primary election in South Carolina
Party	Candidate	Votes	%
Republican	Lindsey Graham (incumbent)	187,736	66.84%
Republican	Buddy Witherspoon	93,125	33.16%
Total votes		280,861	100.00%

2014 United States Senate Republican primary election in South Carolina
Party	Candidate	Votes	%
Republican	Lindsey Graham (incumbent)	178,833	56.42%
Republican	Lee Bright	48,904	15.43%
Republican	Richard Cash	26,325	8.30%
Republican	Det Bowers	23,172	7.31%
Republican	Nancy Mace	19,634	6.19%
Republican	Bill Connor	16,912	5.34%
Republican	Benjamin Dunn	3,209	1.01%
Total votes		316,989	100.00%

2020 United States Senate Republican primary election in South Carolina
Party	Candidate	Votes	%
Republican	Lindsey Graham (incumbent)	317,512	67.69%
Republican	Michael LaPierre	79,932	17.04%
Republican	Joe Reynolds	43,029	9.17%
Republican	Duke Buckner	28,570	6.09%
Total votes		469,043	100.00%

2026 United States Senate Republican primary election in South Carolina
Party	Candidate	Votes	%
Republican	Lindsey Graham (incumbent)	264,091	56.8
Republican	Mark Lynch	134,360	28.9
Republican	Thomas Dismukes	24,164	5.2
Republican	Pat Herrmann	17,448	3.8
Republican	Calvin Cowen	14,171	3.0
Republican	Darius Mitchell	10,842	2.3
Total votes		465,076	100.0

== Personal life ==
Referred to in a Washington Post headline as a "confirmed bachelor", Graham denied being gay. While never publicly romantically linked to a woman, he wrote in his memoir that he had a girlfriend in law school named Debbie, and two more during his time in the Air Force in Germany: a JAG officer named Carol, who later served on Colin Powell's staff, and a flight attendant named Sylvia, to whom he considered proposing. He wrote, "I never found time to meet the right girl, or the right girl was smart enough not to have time for me." On the I've Had It podcast shortly after Graham's death, Hunter Biden noted the friendship between his father Joe Biden and Graham and said that "of course" Graham was gay. In October 2026, progressive and left-wing populist media organization The Young Turks released a documentary interviewing three male former sex workers who alleged that Graham was their client, including one who said he was 17 at the time of the alleged encounter.

Graham had residences in Washington, D.C., and Seneca, South Carolina. A Southern Baptist, he was a member of Seneca's Corinth Baptist Church.

== Death ==
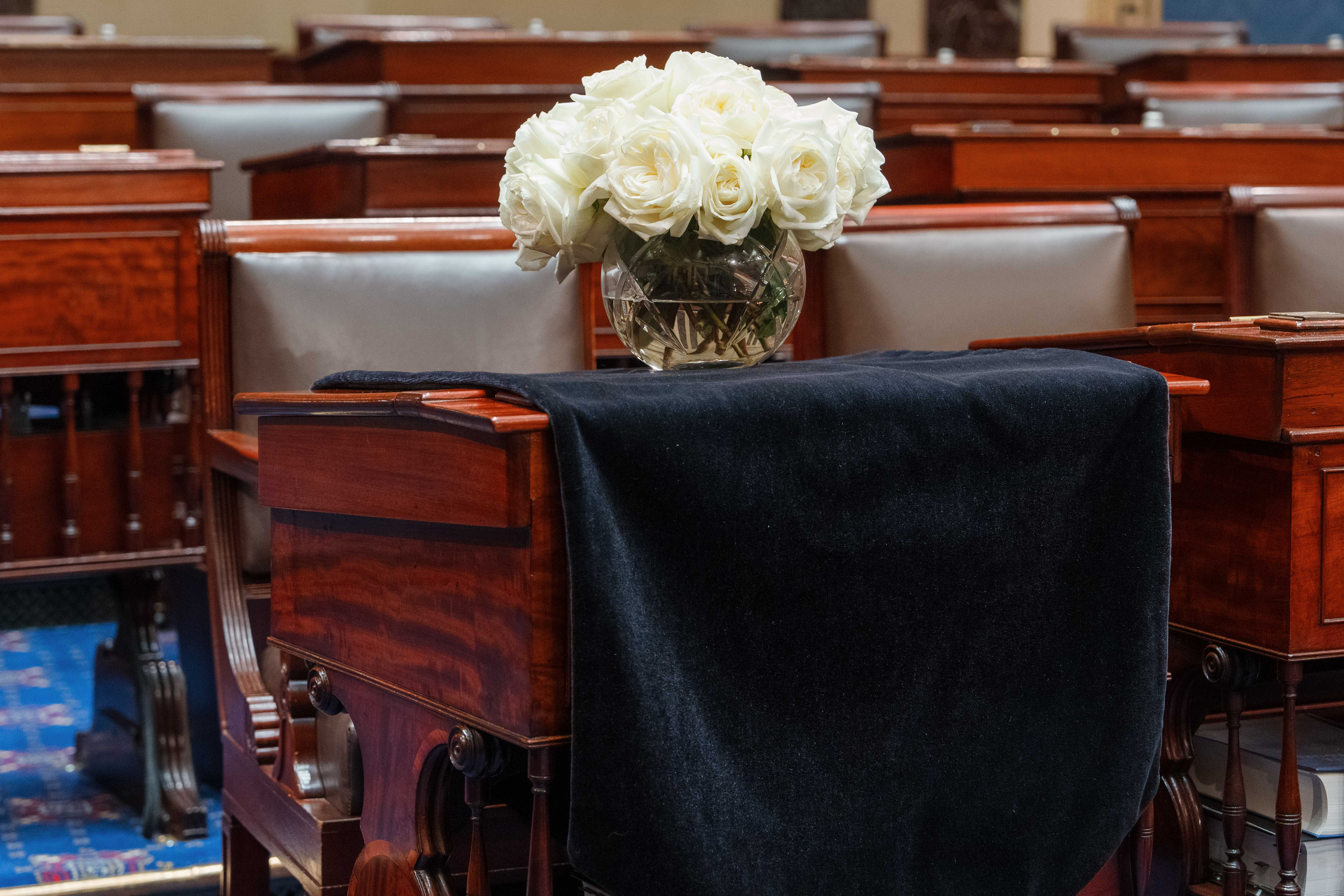
Graham's desk on the Senate floor following his death

Graham died after a "brief and sudden illness" on the evening of July 11, 2026, a day after returning from an official visit to Kyiv, Ukraine. Emergency medical services responded to a call at a home owned by Graham at around 8:30 p.m. EDT in the Capitol Hill section of Washington, D.C. for a patient with chest pain. According to radio transmissions, personnel reported 25 minutes later that a male was in cardiac arrest and that CPR was under way. On July 12, preliminary findings from the D.C. medical examiner stated that Graham died from an aortic dissection caused by arteriosclerotic cardiovascular disease.

=== Reactions ===
==== Domestic ====
Upon the news of Graham's death, President Donald Trump called him a "true American Patriot" and said he was "like a member of the family". Trump later said he spoke with Graham the night before his death about the SAVE America Act, describing him as a close ally and friend who could work across party lines. Former presidents Joe Biden and George W. Bush also honored Graham's public service. Biden recalled their years working together in the Senate, saying they often disagreed but shared a commitment to public service and respect for the institution. Bush praised Graham as a knowledgeable senator who understood America's role in the world and was dedicated to his country.

Graham's colleagues in Congress also paid tribute. U.S. Senate Majority Leader John Thune called him a strong advocate for the United States, while fellow South Carolina senator Tim Scott said America had lost a statesman and he had lost a friend. McMaster called Graham "the fiercest of fighters for South Carolina and America". Vice President JD Vance recalled disagreements with Graham over Ukraine funding but praised him as someone who fought for his beliefs and supported others when it mattered. House Speaker Mike Johnson praised Graham's lifelong service and commitment to "American strength and exceptionalism".

Republican members of South Carolina's congressional delegation also mourned Graham's death. Nancy Mace called him "funny", "smart", and "a force to be reckoned with", while Joe Wilson called him an "American patriot". Ralph Norman remembered him as a "son of South Carolina" who deeply loved the state, and Russell Fry praised him as an "extraordinary public servant" and consequential leader whose legacy would be measured by the many people he helped.

Democratic senators remembered Graham's bipartisan approach and willingness to work across party lines. Senators Richard Blumenthal, Mark Warner, and Dick Durbin highlighted his work on Ukraine, Russia sanctions, and Senate negotiations. Amy Klobuchar praised his commitment to public service, willingness to tackle difficult issues, and efforts to assist Afghan refugees. Elizabeth Warren, Cory Booker, and Adam Schiff also recalled his ability to negotiate despite disagreements, citing his bipartisan work on criminal justice reform, national security, and Ukraine. Chris Coons, who spent Graham's 71st birthday with him during the 2026 NATO summit in Turkey, called him "no better friend, no tougher adversary" and urged Congress to honor his memory through legislation. James Clyburn highlighted their relationship built on mutual respect despite political differences. Former vice president Kamala Harris remembered Graham as a witty, energetic colleague who cared deeply about the Senate and South Carolina.

==== International ====
President of the European Commission Ursula von der Leyen offered her condolences to Graham's family and called him "a determined and fearless leader". Ukrainian president Volodymyr Zelenskyy released a statement offering his condolences, saying: "America and the world have lost a resolute leader." Mark Rutte, secretary general of NATO, said Graham was "a powerful advocate for America"; German chancellor Friedrich Merz said he was "a true friend and partner of Germany in the transatlantic alliance". Finnish president Alexander Stubb mourned Graham as a "personal friend", praising his commitment to NATO, transatlantic cooperation, and support for Ukraine. Estonian foreign minister Margus Tsahkna, Latvian foreign minister Baiba Braže, and Lithuanian foreign minister Kęstutis Budrys jointly paid tribute to Graham, remembering him as a steadfast friend and a strong supporter of NATO, transatlantic relations, and Ukraine. Canadian prime minister Mark Carney said Graham "stood resolutely in defence of democracy and freedom".

Prime Minister of Israel Benjamin Netanyahu said: "Israel has lost one of its greatest friends. America has lost a great patriot. I have lost a beloved friend." He offered his condolences to Graham's family and the American people. Netanyahu later recalled one of his final conversations with Graham, saying that Graham had strongly opposed any reduction of U.S. military aid to Israel and viewed support for Israel's security as connected to U.S. interests. Israeli president Isaac Herzog also paid tribute to Graham, calling him a "great American patriot" a "great friend of Israel", and a "beacon of moral clarity", and praising his support for the U.S.–Israel partnership. Defense Minister Israel Katz said Graham "stood with Israel in its most difficult moments" and was an unwavering supporter of Israel's security and its alliance with the United States. Former Israeli ambassador Michael Oren said Graham's death was a "diplomatic and strategic loss" for Israel, while Iranian state media called Graham a "warmongering and anti-Iranian" senator. Iranian opposition leader Reza Pahlavi said: "His support for Iran's Lion and Sun Revolution earned him the title 'Uncle Lindsey' among Iranians. He will be remembered with profound gratitude and deep respect".

Iranian state television aired a segment celebrating Graham's death and congratulating the Iranian people. The clip went viral on many Iranian outlets and social media accounts, which long viewed him as a leading advocate of military action against Tehran. During the state funeral of Ali Khamenei a week earlier, demonstrators carried signs with Graham's image alongside other figures as future assassination targets. Iranian social media accounts posted images of his face crossed out with a red X on a graphic representing the perpetrators of the United States attacks on Iran. Iranian Foreign Ministry spokesman Esmail Baghaei said of Graham's death, "the Angel of Death is just" and "for such a person, whose entire record is one of malice and support for aggression, nothing but a black record will remain in the minds of people. [...] the death of this radical senator will certainly not sadden the heart of any free person."

=== Memorial services ===
President Trump ordered flags lowered in observance of Graham's death. Governor Henry McMaster also issued an executive order to have flags lowered in South Carolina.

==== Washington, D.C. service ====
A memorial service for Graham took place on July 28 in Washington, D.C..

At an arrival ceremony at the U.S. Capitol, Graham was honored in the Capitol Rotunda. U.S. House Chaplain Margaret Kibben opened the Rotunda. Representative Sheri Biggs, Senate Majority Leader John Thune, and Vice President JD Vance gave eulogies, and, after a military hymn, U.S. Senate chaplain Barry C. Black led closing prayer. Darline Graham and Senate Minority Leader Chuck Schumer were among those in attendance.

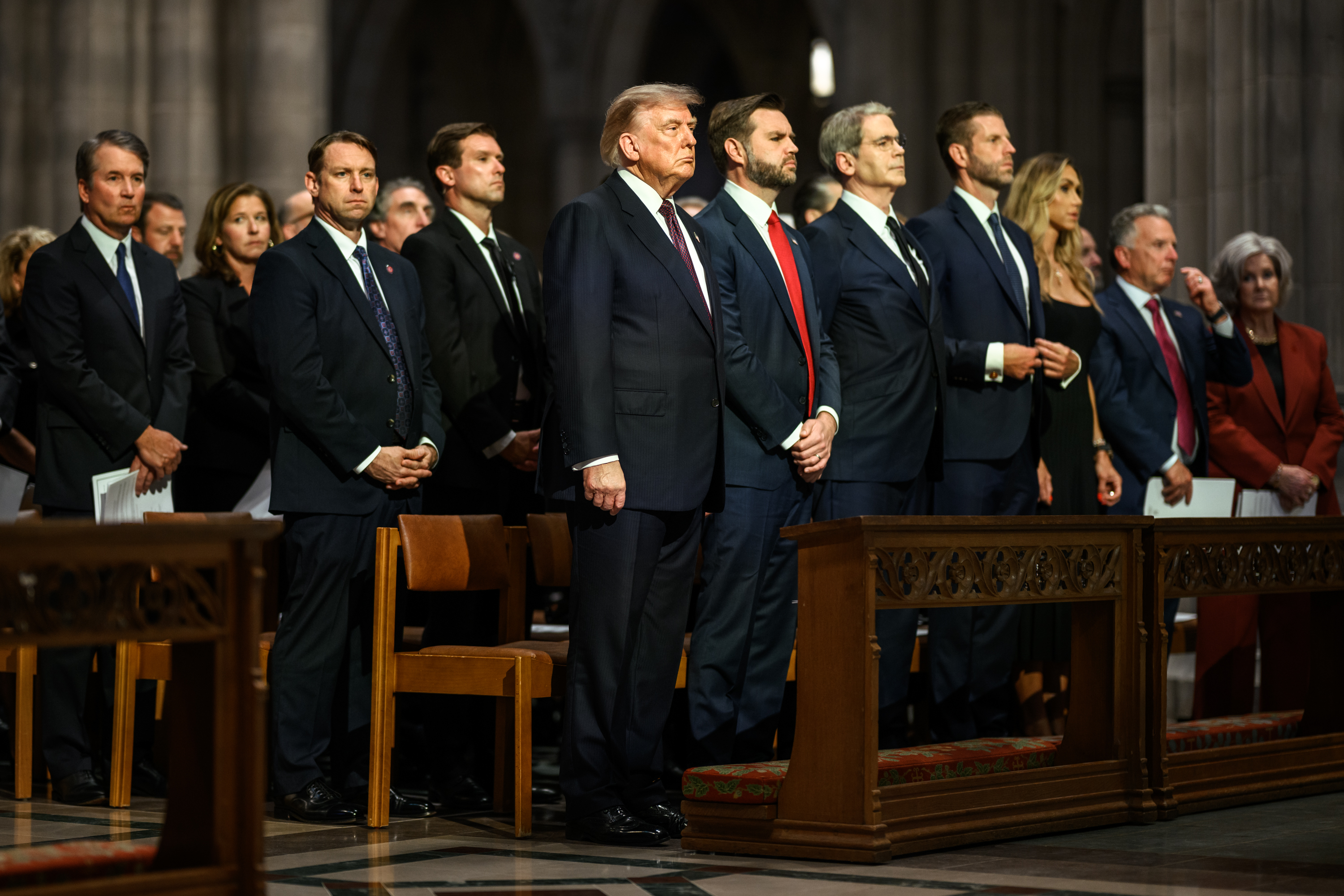
President Donald Trump, Vice President JD Vance, Treasury Secretary Scott Bessent, businessman Eric Trump, and Justice Brett Kavanaugh attending Graham's funeral service on July 28, 2026

Later that afternoon, Graham's casket arrived in the Washington National Cathedral, where his funeral was held. Randy Hollerith, the dean of the Washington National Cathedral, presided over the service, with passages from Scripture also read by Tony Perkins, Marjorie Dannenfelser, and Franklin Graham. President Trump delivered a eulogy, as did Fox News presenter Sean Hannity, Graham's niece Emilie Boggs Roberts, and Tim Tate, the lead pastor of Corinth Baptist Church in Seneca, South Carolina, who was Graham's personal pastor. Israeli Prime Minister Benjamin Netanyahu, Ukrainian President Volodymyr Zelenskyy, and Finnish President Alexander Stubb attended the afternoon service.

==== Columbia service ====
On July 29, Graham was honored at the South Carolina State House in Columbia, South Carolina, with a flyover as his funeral procession made its way to First Baptist Church. Graham's funeral was open to the public, but his burial service in Pickens County, South Carolina, was private.

Attendees included Attorney General of South Carolina Alan Wilson, State Representative Jermaine Johnson, former Ambassador to Canada David H. Wilkins, former Congressman Henry Brown, Lieutenant Governor Pamela Evette, U.S. Representatives Ralph Norman and Sheri Biggs, former South Carolina Governors Nikki Haley and Mark Sanford, Fox News host Sean Hannity, Treasury Secretary Scott Bessent, Judge J. Michelle Childs, South Carolina House Speaker Murrell Smith Jr., State Senator Karl B. Allen, and preservationist Catherine Fleming Bruce.

Speakers included Governor Henry McMaster, Congressman Jim Clyburn, Senator Tim Scott, Fox & Friends co-host Ainsley Earhardt, and former congressman Trey Gowdy.

Graham was buried in Mt. Zion Cemetery in Central, South Carolina.

== Legacy and memorials ==
On August 10, 2026, Joint Base Charleston was renamed Joint Base Lindsey Graham. Present at the naming ceremony were US Senator Darline Graham, South Carolina Governor Henry McMaster, Treasury Secretary Scott Bessent and Secretary of Defense Pete Hegseth.

On August 23, 2026, the University of South Carolina announced its intention to name its planned new ROTC building the Senator Lindsey Graham ROTC Center of Excellence.

On September 19, 2026, US President Donald Trump signed the "Lindsey O. Graham Sanctioning Russia and Iran Act of 2026," which allows him to impose tariffs of up to 100 percent on Russian oil buyers, including China and India, in response to the Russian invasion of Ukraine, as well as to extend existing sanctions on Iran.

In November 2026, Lockheed Martin named its Greenville welcoming center after Graham. US Senate appointee Darline Graham gave remarks at the dedication.

== See also ==
- 2016 Republican Party presidential candidates
- Conspiracy theories related to the 2019 Trump–Ukraine scandal
- List of Republicans who opposed the Donald Trump 2016 presidential campaign
- List of members of the United States Congress who died in office (2000–present)

== Notes ==
U.S. House of Representatives
Preceded by Butler Derrick	Member of the U.S. House of Representatives from South Carolina's 3rd congressional district 1995–2003	Succeeded by Gresham Barrett
Party political offices
Preceded by Strom Thurmond	Republican nominee for U.S. Senator from South Carolina (Class 2); 2002, 2008, 2014, 2020, 2026 (deceased)	Succeeded by Darline Graham
U.S. Senate
Preceded by Strom Thurmond	U.S. Senator (Class 2) from South Carolina; 2003–2026; Served alongside: Ernest Hollings, Jim DeMint, Tim Scott	Succeeded by Darline Graham
Preceded by Chuck Grassley	Chair of the Senate Judiciary Committee; 2019–2021	Succeeded by Dick Durbin
Preceded by Bernie Sanders	Ranking Member of the Senate Budget Committee; 2021–2023	Succeeded by Chuck Grassley
Preceded by Chuck Grassley	Ranking Member of the Senate Judiciary Committee; 2023–2025	Succeeded by Dick Durbin
Preceded by Sheldon Whitehouse	Chair of the Senate Budget Committee; 2025–2026	Succeeded by Ron Johnson
