= Lowell Ross =

American politician (1932–2022)

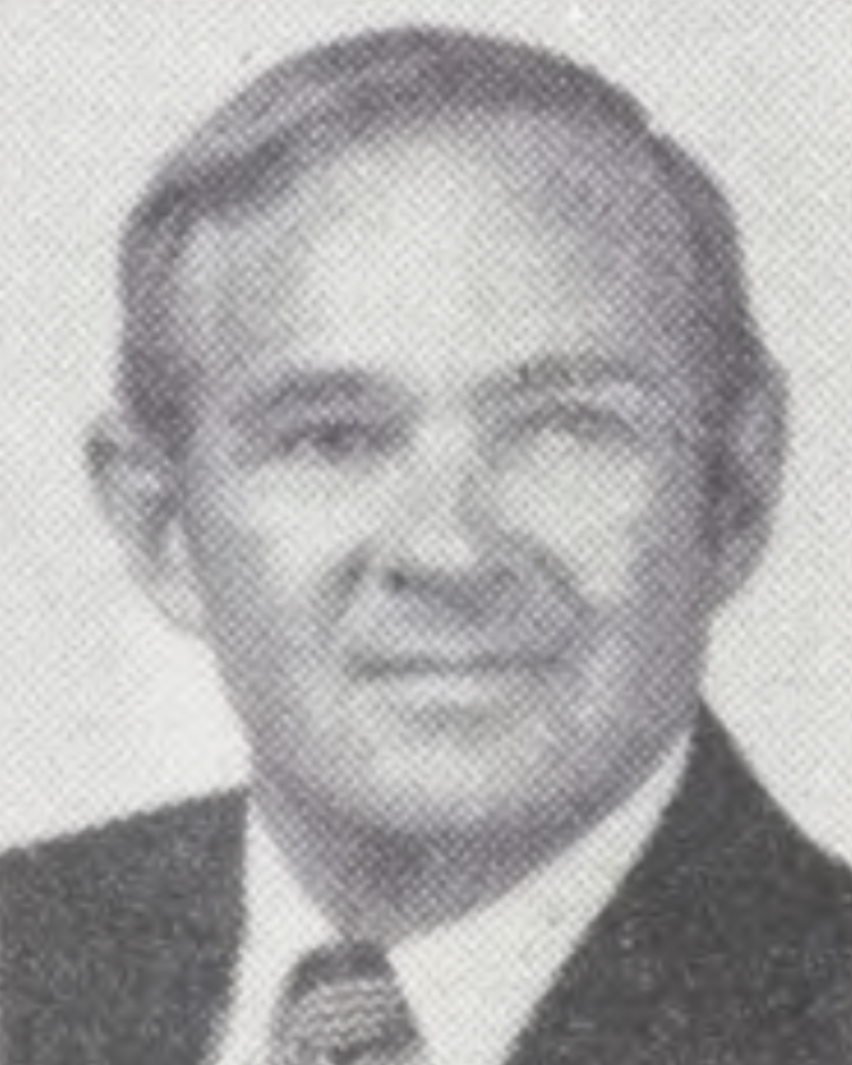
- Ross in 1971

Member of the South Carolina House of Representatives from Oconee County
- In office 1971–1972

Member of the South Carolina House of Representatives from the 2nd district
- In office 1991–1992
- Preceded by: Bob McLellan
- Succeeded by: Lindsey Graham

Personal details
- Born: Lowell William Ross; March 13, 1932 Westminster, South Carolina, U.S.
- Died: September 1, 2022 (aged 90) Columbia, South Carolina, U.S.
- Party: Democratic
- Spouse: Carolyn Tuten (m. 1968)
- Education: University of South Carolina

Lowell William Ross (March 13, 1932 – September 1, 2022) was an American politician. A member of the Democratic Party, he served in the South Carolina House of Representatives from 1971 to 1972 and again from 1991 to 1992.

== Life and career ==
Ross was born in Westminster, South Carolina, the son of Jesse Ross and Jessie Keown. He attended Walhalla High School, graduating in 1949. After graduating, he attended the University of South Carolina, earning his BS degree in 1954. His education was interrupted by military service in the United States Air Force, which after his discharge, he returned to attend the University of South Carolina, earning his LLB degree in 1961.

Ross served in the South Carolina House of Representatives from 1971 to 1972 and again from 1991 to 1992.

== Death ==
Ross died on September 1, 2022, in Columbia, South Carolina, at the age of 90.

Virginia House of Delegates
Preceded by Bob McLellan	Member of the South Carolina House of Representatives from Oconee County; 1971–1972	Succeeded by Lindsey Graham
Member of the South Carolina House of Representatives from the 2nd district 1991–1992
