= 2002 United States Senate election in South Carolina =

- November 5, 2002
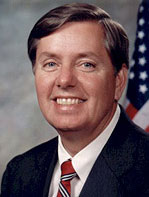

Nominee	Lindsey Graham	Alex Sanders
Party	Republican	Democratic
Popular vote	600,010	487,359
Percentage	54.40%	44.19%
- County results Graham: 50–60% 60–70% 70–80% Sanders: 40–50% 50–60% 60–70% 70–80%
U.S. senator before election
Strom Thurmond
Republican
Elected U.S. Senator
Lindsey Graham
Republican

The 2002 United States Senate election in South Carolina was held on November 5, 2002. Longtime Republican incumbent Strom Thurmond decided to retire at the age of 100, becoming the first centenarian to ever serve in Congress; he died in June 2003. Thurmond's record as the longest-serving senator in U.S. history was later surpassed by West Virginia's Robert Byrd.

Representative Lindsey Graham won the open seat, becoming the first non-incumbent Republican senator from South Carolina since Reconstruction in 1872. He held the seat until his death in 2026. This was the first open Senate election in South Carolina since 1956.

== Democratic primary ==
Alex Sanders, the former president of the College of Charleston, faced no opposition in the Democratic primary and thereby avoided a primary election.

== Republican primary ==
Representative Lindsey Graham had no challenge for the Republican nomination and thus avoided a primary election. This was due in large part because the South Carolina Republicans were preoccupied with the gubernatorial race, and also because potential rivals were deterred by the huge financial war chest Graham had amassed early in the campaign.

=== Endorsements ===
Lindsey Graham

U.S. senators

- Strom Thurmond, South Carolina (1954–2003)

== General election ==
=== Candidates ===
- Ted Adams (C)
- Lindsey Graham (R), U.S. representative
- Victor Kocher (L)
- Alex Sanders (D), former president of the College of Charleston

=== Campaign ===
The election campaign between Graham and Sanders pitted ideology against personality. Graham spread the message to the voters that he had a consistent conservative voting record and that his votes in Congress closely matched that of outgoing Senator Strom Thurmond. Sanders claimed that he was best to represent South Carolina in the Senate because he held membership in the NAACP, the Sons of Confederate Veterans, and the NRA, and because his positions more closely matched the citizens of the state. He said he was against the death penalty for religious reasons, supported abortion rights, and supported greater government involvement in education. Graham attacked Sanders for these positions consistently throughout the campaign, but Sanders hit back at Graham for wanting to privatize Social Security.

Graham scored an impressive victory in the general election, and the margin of victory proved that Democrats had little chance of winning an election in the state for a federal position. He achieved his victory because he rolled up strong margins in the Upstate, and also achieved a majority in the Lowcountry, an area where Sanders had been expected to do well since he hailed from Charleston. However, strong support in the Lowcountry for Republican gubernatorial candidate Mark Sanford doomed Sanders' chances of running up a margin in the coastal counties.

=== Debates ===
- Complete video of debate, October 6, 2002
- Complete video of debate, October 13, 2002
- Complete video of debate, October 18, 2002
- Complete video of debate, October 20, 2002
- Complete video of debate, October 25, 2002

=== Predictions ===
Source	Ranking	As of
Sabato's Crystal Ball	Lean R	November 4, 2002

=== Polling ===
Source	Date	Graham (R)	Sanders (D)
Zogby International	October 11, 2002	47%	35%
Mason-Dixon Political/Media Research	October 13, 2002	51%	34%
SurveyUSA	October 20, 2002	53%	44%
SurveyUSA	October 27, 2002	49%	48%
Mason-Dixon Political/Media Research	October 29, 2002	53%	36%
SurveyUSA	November 4, 2002	49%	48%

=== Results ===
South Carolina U.S. Senate election, 2002
Party	Candidate	Votes	%	±%
Republican	Lindsey Graham	600,010	54.40%	+1.02%
Democratic	Alex Sanders	487,359	44.19%	+0.20%
Constitution	Ted Adams	8,228	0.75%	N/A
Libertarian	Victor Kocher	6,684	0.61%	−0.51%
Write-in		667	0.06%	N/A
Total votes		1,102,948	100.00%	
Majority		112,651	10.21%	+0.82%
Turnout		1,102,948	53.9%	−10.1%
Republican hold				

==== Counties that flipped from Republican to Democratic ====
- Calhoun (largest town: St. Matthews)
- Darlington (largest city: Hartsville)
- Abbeville (largest city: Abbeville)
- Chesterfield (largest city: Cheraw)
- Sumter (largest city: Sumter)
- McCormick (largest town: McCormick)

==== County that flipped from Democratic to Republican ====
- Horry (largest town: Myrtle Beach)

== See also ==
- 2002 United States Senate elections
- List of United States senators from South Carolina
- 2002 South Carolina gubernatorial election
