= Alex Sanders (politician) =

American politician and academic administrator (1938–2026)

19th President of the College of Charleston
- In office 1992–2001
- Preceded by: Harry Lightsey
- Succeeded by: Leo Higdon

Chief Judge of the South Carolina Court of Appeals
- In office 1983–1992
- Preceded by: Position established
- Succeeded by: William Howell

Member of the South Carolina Senate from the 7th district
- In office 1977–1983

Member of the South Carolina House of Representatives from Richland County
- In office 1967–1975

Personal details
- Born: Alexander Mullings Sanders Jr. September 29, 1938 Columbia, South Carolina, U.S.
- Died: October 20, 2026 (aged 88) Columbia, South Carolina, U.S.
- Spouse: Zoe Dutrow
- Children: 1
- Education: University of South Carolina (BA, LLB); University of Virginia (LLM)

Alexander Mullings Sanders Jr. (September 29, 1938 – October 20, 2026) was an American politician, jurist and academic administrator from the state of South Carolina. He served in the South Carolina House of Representatives and South Carolina Senate as a Democrat before becoming the first chief judge of the South Carolina Court of Appeals in 1983. Sanders later served as president of the College of Charleston from 1992 to 2001 and was the Democratic nominee for the United States Senate in 2002, losing to Lindsey Graham. He also co-founded the Charleston School of Law and taught at the College of Charleston until 2020.

== Early life and education ==
Sanders was born in and grew up in Columbia, South Carolina. His mother was a schoolteacher and his father made money by arranging hunting and fishing trips. Sanders grew up in modest circumstances in Columbia and met his future wife, Zoe Dutrow, at a local playground when they were four years old. He attended AC Moore Elementary School, Hand Middle School, and Dreher High School.

As a youth, Sanders briefly worked for a traveling carnival. After serving in the United States Army, he received his bachelor's degree and J.D. from the University of South Carolina. He later earned a master's degree in judicial process from the University of Virginia.

== Political and judicial career ==
=== Service in the South Carolina State House ===
After graduating from law school in 1962, Sanders practiced as a trial lawyer. Sanders entered politics in 1966 when he became a member of the South Carolina House of Representatives. During the late 1960s, he was in a group of young reform-minded legislators known as the Young Turks, which included Joseph P. Riley Jr. and Richard Riley.

In 1970, Sanders led a successful campaign against B.A.S.F. which had planned to build a chemical plant near Hilton Head Island. The next year, he took part in a successful campaign against logging in the Santee Swamp, claiming to have heard an Ivory-billed woodpecker there. Decades later, in an interview, Sanders stated that if his claim of having heard the woodpecker (long believed to be extinct) had not worked, he was "prepared to announce the discovery of a long-lost Civil War battlefield in the swamp", and further joked that "[w]e had the cannonballs ready.” Sanders remained involved in the campaign to preserve the Santee swamp, as well as the nearby Congaree Swamp, including efforts to obtain federal protection for the area that ultimately became Congaree National Park.

Sanders served as a State Senator from 1977 to 1983. From 1976 to 1978, he served as the first chair of South Carolina's Council of Advisors, a body established to assist the state Department of Consumer Affairs in administering and obtaining compliance with the South Carolina Consumer Protection Code. Sanders was also the primary sponsor of legislation which ensured that revenue from South Carolina's migratory-waterfowl stamp was used solely for "the cost of printing, promotion and production of the stamp and for those migratory waterfowl projects specified by the [South Carolina Wildlife and Martine Resources] Commission for the development, protection and propagation of waterfowl in the State". He further co-sponsored the South Carolina Water Use Reporting and Coordination Act, enacted in 1982, which established a statewide system for gathering information on substantial withdrawals and uses of surface and groundwater.

In 1983, the then all-white South Carolina Senate voted to adopt a single-member district reapportionment plan that insured African Americans would be elected to the body for the first time in almost a century. Prior to this vote, there had been several political roadblocks. In December 1982, Sanders removed one of those roadblocks when "he announced that he would not seek reelection and expressed hope that this would make it easier to divide Richland County into four single-member districts that would insure election of a black senator."

=== Tenure on the South Carolina Court of Appeals ===
Because of his popularity within the state house, he was appointed the first ever chief judge of the newly-created South Carolina Court of Appeals. He served in that capacity until 1992 when he left to become President of the College of Charleston. Court opinions Alex Sanders authored while on the South Carolina Court of Appeals include:

- Price v. Watt, 280 S.C. 510, 313 S.E.2d 58 (1984);
- Langley v. Boyter, 284 S.C. 162, 325 S.E.2d 550 (1984);
- Doe v. Doe, 286 S.C. 507, 334 S.E.2d 829 (Ct. App. 1985);
- Herald Publ’g Co. v. Barnwell, 291 S.C. 4, 351 S.E.2d 878 (Ct. App. 1986);
- M&T Chemicals, Inc. v. Barker Industries, Inc., 296 S.C. 103, 370 S.E.2d 886 (Ct. App. 1988); and
- Husband v. Wife, 301 S.C. 531, 392 S.E.2d 811 (1990).

In another opinion, he declined to rule on whether fellatio constituted adultery.

=== 2002 United States Senate race ===
In 2002, Sanders was the Democratic nominee for the U.S. Senate seat left vacant after the retirement of Strom Thurmond. The Senate seat had not been open since 1966. Sanders was an underdog in the race and was ultimately defeated by the Republican candidate, U.S. Representative Lindsey Graham.

During the campaign, then President George W. Bush and Vice President Dick Cheney came to South Carolina to campaign for Graham. Sanders supported President George W. Bush’s 2001 tax cuts and called gubernatorial candidate Mark Sanford’s proposal to eliminate the sales tax exemption on gasoline “a bad idea.” He also opposed Graham's proposal to allow workers to invest part of their Social Security contributions in private investment accounts.

== Political views ==
Sanders was an environmentalist throughout his political career. On social issues, he opposed the death penalty, including its use against terrorists, arguing during his 2002 Senate campaign that life imprisonment was preferable to allowing terrorists to become martyrs. He also opposed a constitutional amendment prohibiting the burning of the American flag.

He was a member of both the American Civil Liberties Union and the National Rifle Association. Despite this, during the 2002 Senate campaign, pamphlets were sent to voters’ homes across the state falsely claiming that Sanders opposed gun rights.

== Academic career ==
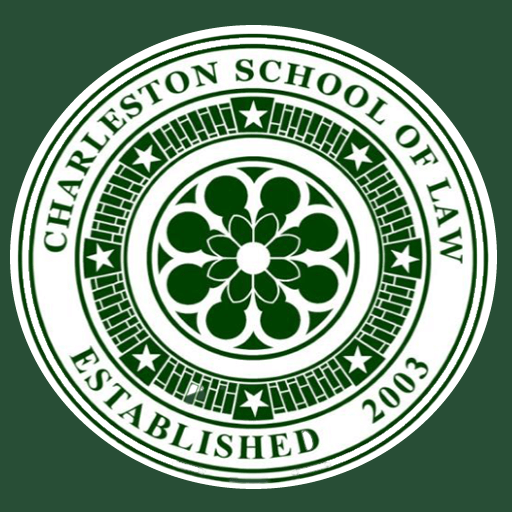
Seal for Charleston School of Law, an institution co-founded by Sanders.

Sanders was the 19th president of the College of Charleston (1992–2001). During Sanders' tenure as president, "the total number of students enrolled at the College increased by 16 percent, the number of minority students increased by 32 percent and the number of international students increased by a whopping 99 percent." He was also instrumental in the College’s purchase of the property where its main library, Addlestone Library, now sits, as well as in the development of the Patriots Point Athletics Complex, the Tate Center at the School of Business, and the Jewish Studies Center.

After his tenure as president of the College of Charleston ended, Sanders helped found the Charleston School of Law where he served as President from 2002 until 2013. During these years, Sanders also remained on the College of Charleston faculty and taught an undergraduate course on the law regularly until 2020.

He was a fellow at the Harvard Institute of Politics during the fall 2003 semester. Sanders continued practicing law after leaving public office and academia.

== Death and funeral ==
Sanders died in Columbia on October 20, 2026, at the age of 88. Governor Henry McMaster issued an Executive Order for flags to be lowered to half staff on November 5, 2026.

Sanders' funeral was held on November 5, 2026 at Trinity Episcopal Cathedral in Columbia, South Carolina. Attendees included Governor McMaster, former Governor Jim Hodges, former South Carolina Supreme Court Chief Justice Costa M. Pleicones, former state Senators John C. Land III, John Courson and Dick Harpootlian.

Party political offices
Preceded by Elliott Close	Democratic nominee for U.S. Senator from South Carolina (Class 2); 2002	Succeeded by Bob Conley
