= 2026 United States Senate election in South Carolina =

- November 3, 2026

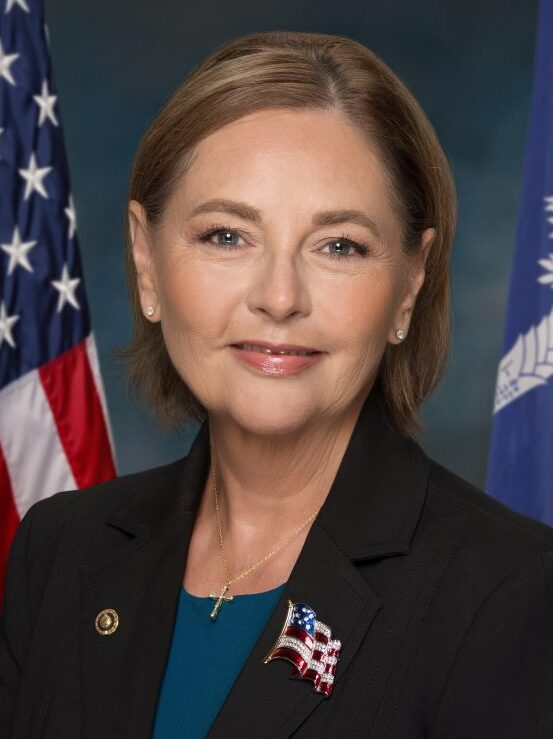
Nominee	Annie Andrews	Darline Graham (replaced Lindsey Graham)
Party	Democratic	Republican
Popular vote	1,044,001	952,191
Percentage	51.14%	46.64%
- Andrews: 40–50% 50–60% 60–70% 70–80% 80–90% >90% Graham: 40–50% 50–60% 60–70% 70–80% 80–90% >90% Tie: 50% No data
U.S. senator before election
Darline Graham (Note: Appointed to complete Lindsey Graham's unfinished term.)
Republican
Elected U.S. senator
Annie Andrews
Democratic

The 2026 United States Senate election in South Carolina was held on November 3, 2026, to elect a member of the United States Senate to represent South Carolina. Democratic pediatrician Annie Andrews defeated Republican appointee Darline Graham in what was considered an upset.

Graham's brother, four-term incumbent Lindsey, won the Republican nomination in the June 9 primaries, but died on July 11, triggering an August 11 special primary. Appointed to her brother's seat and encouraged to run with the support of President Donald Trump, Graham advanced to an August 25 runoff against Representative Ralph Norman, defeating him with 52.5% of the vote. Andrews won the Democratic nomination with 61.5% of the vote over former Paine College administrator Brandon Brown.

Though the election was initially forecast as a safe hold for Republicans, a national environment heavily favoring Democrats, along with scrutiny of Graham's qualifications, led to a more competitive race, with polling in the weeks before the election showing it significantly tightening. Andrews ultimately won the election, becoming the first woman elected to the Senate from South Carolina and the first Democrat to win a Senate race in the state since 1998. She is also the first Democrat to win a statewide race since the 2006 superintendent of education election.

This was one of eight seats Democrats flipped in a state carried by Donald Trump in the 2024 presidential election.

== Background ==
South Carolina is generally considered a Republican stronghold, having last elected a Democrat to the U.S. Senate in 1998. Republican nominee Donald Trump won South Carolina in the 2020 presidential election by 12 percentage points; in 2024, his margin grew to 18 points. Republicans control every statewide office (except the state's comptroller office) and have supermajorities in both chambers of the state legislature, both U.S. Senate seats, and all but one seat in South Carolina's U.S. House congressional delegation.

Lindsey Graham was first elected in 2002, defeating Democrat Alex Sanders by about 10 percentage points. He was reelected in 2008, 2014, and most recently in 2020, defeating Jaime Harrison by 10 percentage points in what was expected to be a close race. In January 2025, he declared that he was running for reelection. Graham died suddenly on July 11, 2026, from aortic dissection.

== Interim appointment ==
After Graham died, Governor Henry McMaster was tasked with appointing a successor to serve the remainder of his term. Lieutenant Governor Pamela Evette was considered a possible appointee, while U.S. Representative Joe Wilson declined consideration. On July 13, President Donald Trump publicly recommended that McMaster appoint Darline Graham, Lindsey's sister, to serve the remainder of the term, as did Senate Majority Leader John Thune. McMaster selected Darline on July 13 and she was sworn in on July 14. She is the first woman to represent South Carolina in the U.S. Senate. On July 20, Darline announced that she would run for her first full term in office.

=== Appointee ===
- Darline Graham, commissioner for the South Carolina Commission for the Blind (2019–2026)

=== Considered but not appointed ===
- Pamela Evette, lieutenant governor of South Carolina (2019-2027)

=== Declined to be considered ===
- Joe Wilson, U.S. representative from South Carolina's 2nd congressional district (2001–present) (running for reelection)

== Initial Republican primary ==
=== Candidates ===
==== Died after nomination ====
- Lindsey Graham, incumbent U.S. senator (died July 11, 2026)

==== Eliminated in primary ====
- Calvin Cowen, Duncan council member
- Thomas Dismukes, motivational speaker
- Patrick Herrmann, Horry County Republican Party executive committeeman
- Mark Lynch, appliance repair executive (also ran in special primary)
- Darius L. Mitchell, hip hop artist (disqualified from special primary)

==== Did not file ====
- Thomas Murphy, retired Navy hospital corpsman

==== Withdrawn ====
- André Bauer, former lieutenant governor of South Carolina (2003–2011), candidate for governor in 2010, and candidate for South Carolina's 7th congressional district in 2012
- Paul Dans, former Office of Personnel Management chief of staff (2020) and Project 2025 architect (endorsed Lynch)
- Ethan Holliman, graduate student

==== Declined ====
- Ralph Norman, U.S. representative from South Carolina's 5th congressional district (2017–2027) (ran for governor, ran in special primary)
- Mark Sanford, former governor of South Carolina (2003–2011), U.S. representative from South Carolina's 1st congressional district (1995–2001, 2013–2019), and candidate for president in 2020 (declared for but did not file for U.S. House, ran in US Senate special primary)

=== Endorsements ===
Lindsey Graham (deceased)

Executive branch officials

- Ben Carson, former secretary of housing and urban development (2017–2021)
- Donald Trump, president of the United States (2017–2021, 2025–present)

U.S. senators

- Tim Scott, South Carolina (2013–present)

Statewide officials

- Henry McMaster, governor of South Carolina (2017–2027)

Organizations

- AIPAC
- ClearPath Foundation
- National Right to Life Committee
- Susan B. Anthony Pro-Life America
- Tea Party Express
Mark Lynch

Executive branch officials

- Gregory Bovino, former Commander-at-large of US Border Patrol (2025–2026)
- Michael Flynn, former national security advisor (2017)
- Joe Kent, former director of the National Counterterrorism Center (2025–2026)

State legislators

- Thomas Beach, HD-10 (2022–present)
- Mike Burns, HD-17 (2013–present)
- Jay Kilmartin, HD-85 (2022–present)
- Ryan McCabe, HD-96 (2020–present)
- Joe White, HD-40 (2022–present)

Individuals

- Paul Dans, former Office of Personnel Management chief of staff (2020) and Project 2025 architect
- Abby Johnson, anti-abortion activist
Paul Dans (withdrawn)

Individuals

- Tucker Carlson, conservative political commentator

=== Fundraising ===
Campaign finance reports as of March 31, 2026
Candidate	Raised	Spent	Cash on hand
Thomas Dismukes (R)	$14,935	$13,125	$1,810
Lindsey Graham (R)	$20,688,173	$21,566,021	$11,613,609
Ethan Holliman (R)	$20,270	$20,270	$0
Mark Lynch (R)	$5,726,191	$2,398,855	$3,327,336
Paul Dans (R)	$1,011,421	$565,237	$446,184
Source: Federal Election Commission

=== Polling ===
Poll source	Date(s) administered	Sample size (Note: Key: A – all adults RV – registered voters LV – likely voters V – unclear)	Margin of error	Paul Dans	Lindsey Graham	Mark Lynch	Other	Undecided
Trafalgar Group (R)	June 5–7, 2026	1,200 (LV)	± 2.9%	—	49%	29%	11% (Note: Thomas Dismukes with 4%; Darius Mitchell & Patrick Herrmann with 3%; Calvin Cowen with 1%)	11%
InsiderAdvantage (R)	June 5–6, 2026	800 (LV)	± 3.5%	—	51%	21%	10%	18%
The Public Sentiment Institute	June 3–4, 2026	388 (LV)	± 5.0%	—	51%	26%	18% (Note: Thomas Dismukes with 7%; Patrick Herrmann with 5%; Darius Mitchell with 4%; Calvin Cowen with 2%)	4%
The Citadel	May 21–31, 2026	600 (LV)	± 4.5%	—	46%	36%	—	18%
Trafalgar Group (R)	May 21–24, 2026	1,125 (LV)	± 2.9%	—	52%	28%	12% (Note: Darius Mitchell with 4%; Thomas Dismukes & Patrick Herrmann with 3%; Calvin Cowen with 2%)	8%
InsiderAdvantage (R)	May 13–14, 2026	800 (LV)	± 3.5%	—	56%	13%	8% (Note: Calvin Cowen with 3%; Thomas Dismukes & Darius Mitchell with 2%; Patrick Herrmann with 1%)	23%
	April 10, 2026	Dans withdraws from the race						
Pulse Opinion Research (R) (Note: Poll sponsored by Lynch's campaign.)	March 11–17, 2026	1,000 (LV)	± 3.1%	11%	41%	21%	—	22%
Quantus Insights (R) (Note: Poll sponsored by Trending Politics, a conservative news website.)	October 1–4, 2025	600 (RV)	± 4.2%	7% (Note: With voters who lean towards a given candidate)	58%	15%	—	20%
Quantus Insights (R)	October 1–4, 2025	600 (RV)	± 4.2%	6%	51%	11%	—	32%
Big Data Poll (R) (Note: Poll sponsored by Dans's campaign.)	September 26–29, 2025	827 (RV)	± 3.5%	22%	46%	4%	—	28%
Quantus Insights (R)	June 10–13, 2025	600 (RV)	± 3.8%	—	48%	23%	—	29%
Big Data Poll (R)	June 8–11, 2025	— (V)	± 3.5%	9%	50%	11%	—	30%
Pulse Opinion Research (R)	May 15–21, 2025	1,062 (LV)	—	—	43%	29%	5%	23%

=== Results ===
Initial primary results by county: Graham: 40–50%; 50–60%; 60–70%; 70–80%; Lynch: 40–50%

Republican primary results
Party	Candidate	Votes	%
Republican	Lindsey Graham (incumbent)	264,091	56.8
Republican	Mark Lynch	134,360	28.9
Republican	Thomas Dismukes	24,164	5.2
Republican	Pat Herrmann	17,448	3.8
Republican	Calvin Cowen	14,171	3.0
Republican	Darius Mitchell	10,842	2.3
Total votes		465,076	100.0

== Special Republican primary ==
Lindsey Graham, who had won the Republican primary, died on July 11, 2026. Under South Carolina law, a special primary election was held on August 11 to select a replacement Republican nominee.

The three-week campaign was an unusually compressed U.S. Senate race. The candidate filing period opened at noon on July 21 and closed at noon on July 28. The South Carolina State Election Commission ruled that the special Republican primary will be treated as a continuation of the June 9 primary. Accordingly, only voters who participated in the Republican primary or did not vote in either party's June 9 primary were eligible to vote; those who voted in the Democratic primary were ineligible, despite South Carolina's open primary system, which does not require party registration. Federal law generally requires military and overseas ballots to be mailed at least 45 days before a federal election, while the special election took take place 31 days after Lindsey Graham's death triggered the vacancy.

In June, the South Carolina Republican Party adopted a measure stating that to qualify for elected office in a Republican primary, a candidate must have voted in at least two of the last three statewide Republican primary elections. On July 28, the South Carolina Republican Party decertified three candidates seeking the nomination. Clark Neilson was disqualified for not living in the state and Darius Mitchell and Danny Ford II were disqualified for not meeting the new state party requirement. On July 30, Ford announced that he was suing the South Carolina Republican party to be placed on the ballot. His attorney, state senator Brad Hutto, said the party's new rule violates both the South Carolina and the US constitutions. On August 3, Richland County judge Daniel Coble ordered that Ford's name be on the ballot.

U.S. President Donald Trump said that if she ran in the primary he would endorse Darline Graham, Lindsey Graham's sister. By July 20, she announced she would run in the special primary for a full term. Ralph Norman, Russell Fry, Mark Sanford, and Mark Lynch also launched campaigns. No candidate received a majority of the vote, so a runoff election between Darline Graham and Ralph Norman was held on August 25.

=== Candidates ===
==== Nominee ====
- Darline Graham, incumbent senator (2026–2027)

==== Eliminated in runoff ====
- Ralph Norman, U.S. representative from South Carolina's 5th congressional district (2017–2027) and candidate for governor in 2026

==== Eliminated in primary ====
- Duke Buckner, attorney and perennial candidate
- Danny Ford II, son of former Clemson football coach Danny Ford, and candidate for South Carolina Commissioner of Agriculture in 2026
- Russell Fry, U.S. representative from South Carolina's 7th congressional district (2023–present) (also ran for reelection)
- Mark Lynch, appliance repair executive (also ran in initial primary)
- Mark McBride, former mayor of Myrtle Beach and candidate for South Carolina's 7th congressional district in 2022
- Glenda Gail Parker, retired Air Force officer, Pentagon civil servant and contractor
- Mark Sanford, former governor of South Carolina (2003–2011), U.S. representative from South Carolina's 1st congressional district (1995–2001, 2013–2019), and candidate for president in 2020
- Samuel Shepherd, biochemical engineer

==== Disqualified ====
- Darius L. Mitchell, hip hop artist (also ran in initial primary)
- Clark Neilson, North Carolina business owner

==== Declined ====
- Scott Bessent, United States Secretary of the Treasury (2025–present)
- Sheri Biggs, U.S. representative from South Carolina's 3rd congressional district (2025–present) (ran for reelection, declined to endorse)
- Trey Gowdy, former U.S. representative from South Carolina's 4th congressional district (2011–2019)
- Nikki Haley, former United States ambassador to the United Nations (2017–2018), former governor of South Carolina (2011–2017), and candidate for president in 2024 (endorsed Norman in runoff)
- Nancy Mace, U.S. representative from South Carolina's 1st congressional district (2021–2027), candidate for U.S. Senate in 2014, and candidate for governor in 2026 (endorsed Norman)
- William Timmons, U.S. representative from South Carolina's 4th congressional district (2019–present) (ran for reelection, endorsed Graham)
- Joe Wilson, U.S. representative from South Carolina's 2nd congressional district (2001–present) (ran for reelection, declined to endorse)

=== First round ===
==== Endorsements ====
Russell Fry

State legislators

- Davey Hiott, House majority leader (2022–present) from HD-4 (2004–present)
- 5 state senators (Note: JD Chaplin, SD-29 (2024–present); Greg Hembree, SD-28 (2013–present); Carlisle Kennedy, SD-23 (2025–present); Matt Leber, SD-41 (2024–present); Jeff Zell, SD-36 (2025–present))
- 34 other state representatives (Note: Jeff Bradley, HD-123 (2014–present); Gary Brewer, HD-114 (2022–present); Case Brittain, HD-107 (2020–present); Micah Caskey, HD-89 (2017–present); Neal Collins, HD-5 (2014–present); Brandon Cox, HD-92 (2022–present); Heather Ammons Crawford, HD-68 (2012–present); Sylleste Davis, HD-100 (2016–present); Adam Duncan, HD-2 (2024–present); Cal Forrest, HD-39 (2016–present); Craig Gagnon, HD-111 (2012–present); Gil Gatch, HD-94 (2020–present); Val Guest, HD-106 (2022–present); Brandon Guffey, HD-48 (2023–present); Patrick Haddon, HD-19 (2019–present); Kevin Hardee, HD-105 (2012–present); Lee Hewitt, HD-108 (2016–present); Harriet Holman, HD-102 (2024–present); Jeff Johnson, HD-58 (2014–present); Brian Lawson, HD-30 (2022–present); Randy Ligon, HD-43 (2018–present); Phillip Lowe, HD-60 (2007–present); David Martin, HD-26 (2024–present); Tim McGinnis, HD-56 (2018–present); Cody Mitchell, HD-65 (2022–present); Scott Montgomery, HD-32 (2024–present); Mike Neese, HD-44 (2022–present); Brandon Newton, HD-45 (2016–present); Melissa Lackey Oremus, HD-84 (2019–present); Heath Sessions, HD-46 (2022–present); Carla Schuessler, HD-61 (2022–present); Bill Taylor, HD-86 (2010–present); Chris Wooten, HD-69 (2018–present); Richie Yow, HD-53 (2014–present))
Darline Graham

Executive branch officials

- Donald Trump, president of the United States (2017–2021, 2025–present)

U.S. senators

- John Barrasso, Senate majority whip (2025–present) from Wyoming (2007–present)
- Shelley Moore Capito, West Virginia (2015–present)
- Tom Cotton, Arkansas (2015–present)
- Lisa Murkowski, Alaska (2002–present)

U.S. representatives

- William Timmons, SC-4 (2019–present)

Organizations

- Maggie's List
- National Republican Senatorial Committee
- Republican Jewish Coalition
Ralph Norman

Executive branch officials

- Mark Meadows, former White House chief of staff (2020–2021)

U.S. senators

- Jim DeMint, former South Carolina (2005–2013)

U.S. senators

- Mike Lee, Utah (2011–present)
- Rick Scott, Florida (2019–present)

U.S. representatives

- Nancy Mace, SC-1 (2021–2027)

State legislators

- Jordan Pace, HD-117 (2023–present), and chairman of the South Carolina Freedom Caucus

Local officials

- 4 county sheriffs (Note: Lee Boan, Kershaw County; Tony Breeden, York County; Hobart Lewis, Greenville County; Bill Rhyne, Spartanburg County)

Organizations

- National Association for Gun Rights
- Senate Conservatives Fund
- Turning Point Action
Mark Sanford

State legislators

- Tom Davis, SD-46 (2009–present)
Declined to endorse

U.S. senators

- James Lankford, Oklahoma (2015–present)
- John Thune, Senate majority leader (2025–2027) from South Dakota (2005–present)

U.S. representatives

- Sheri Biggs, SC-3 (2025–present)
- Joe Wilson, SC-2 (2001–present)

==== Fundraising ====
Campaign finance reports as of July 22, 2026
Candidate	Raised	Spent	Cash on hand
Duke Buckner (R)	$10,960	$10,456	$504
Russell Fry (R)	$495,027	$10,441	$484,586
Mark Lynch (R)	$5,919,539	$5,372,977	$546,561
Ralph Norman (R)	$173,610	$2,189	$171,421
Mark Sanford (R)	$206,237	$177,136	$1,352,604
Source: Federal Election Commission

==== Polling ====
Poll source	Date(s) administered	Sample size	Margin of error	Russell Fry	Darline Graham	Mark Lynch	Ralph Norman	Mark Sanford	Other	Undecided
Trafalgar Group (R)	August 8–10, 2026	1,027 (LV)	± 2.9%	18%	26%	8%	20%	18%	5% (Note: Danny Lee Ford with 2%; Duke Buckner, Glenda Gail Parker, Sam Shepherd, and Mark McBride with 1%)	5%
Quantus Insights (R)	August 5–6, 2026	668 (LV)	± 4.0%	20%	33%	8%	20%	17%	2%	—
co/efficient (R)	July 28–30, 2026	857 (LV)	± 3.3%	16%	30%	6%	15%	9%	4% (Note: Duke Buckner with 2%; Mark McBride with 1%; Glenda Gail Parker and Sam Shepherd with 0%)	20%
Trafalgar Group (R)	July 28–30, 2026	989 (LV)	± 2.9%	17%	27%	8%	17%	15%	2% (Note: Samuel Sam Shepherd and Duke Buckner with 1%; Mark McBride and Clark Nielson with 0%)	12%
Emerson College	July 28–29, 2026	500 (LV)	± 4.3%	12%	19%	7%	22%	11%	3%	25%

Hypothetical polling

Poll source	Date(s) administered	Sample size	Margin of error	Pamela Evette	Russell Fry	Darline Graham	Trey Gowdy	Mark Lynch	Nancy Mace	Henry McMaster	Ralph Norman	Mark Sanford	Other	Undecided
Resonance Media Services (R)	July 21, 2026	600 (LV)	± 4.0%	10%	7%	21%	—	7%	3%	—	17%	7%	1% (Note: Duke Buckner with 1%)	25%
Innovative Communication Strategies	July 20–21, 2026	788 (LV)	± 3.5%	6%	12%	16%	—	9%	7%	—	19%	5%	2% (Note: Duke Buckner with 2%)	26%
Peak Insights (R)	July 18–20, 2026	900 (LV)	± 3.0%	4%	9%	9%	38%	7%	6%	—	13%	4%	2% (Note: "None/other" with 2%)	8%
Emerson College	July 14–15, 2026	500 (LV)	± 4.3%	10%	9%	6%	—	13%	10%	8%	16%	5%	5% (Note: "Someone else" with 5%)	18%

==== Debates ====
Republican special primary debates
No.	Date	Host	Moderator	Link	Republican	Republican	Republican	Republican	Republican
Key: P Participant A Absent									
Key: P Participant A Absent					Russell Fry	Darline Graham	Mark Lynch	Ralph Norman	Mark Sanford
1	August 3, 2026	Gray Media	Judi Gatson	YouTube	P	P	P	P	P
2	August 4, 2026	Nexstar Media Group	Alicia Barnes; Carolyn Murray	YouTube	P	A	P	P	P

==== Results ====
Primary results by county: Graham: 30–40%; 40–50%; 50–60%; Norman: 30–40%; 40–50%; Fry: 30–40%; 40–50%

Republican special primary results
Party	Candidate	Votes	%
Republican	Darline Graham (incumbent)	109,881	32.8
Republican	Ralph Norman	82,627	24.6
Republican	Russell Fry	65,955	19.7
Republican	Mark Sanford	50,136	14.9
Republican	Mark Lynch	19,892	5.9
Republican	Danny Ford II	2,804	0.8
Republican	Duke Buckner	1,583	0.5
Republican	Glenda Gail Parker	977	0.3
Republican	Samuel Shepherd	931	0.3
Republican	Mark McBride	769	0.2
Total votes		335,555	100.0

=== Runoff ===
Graham and Norman were considered closely matched in the primary, with Graham's endorsement by Trump weighing against Norman's legislative experience and reputation as a staunchly conservative outsider. Trump vigorously campaigned for Graham, headlining a rally for her in Myrtle Beach. He also made numerous calls to prominent South Carolina officials to secure their support for Graham, including to Russell Fry, who endorsed her on August 14, and to Governor McMaster, who held a press conference emphasizing his support for her.

President Donald Trump speaks to reporters on October 21, 2026, before heading to Clemson, South Carolina to campaign for US Senate appointee Darline Graham.

In The New York Times, Michael Gold wrote that Trump had two main disputes with Norman that solidified his support for Graham: Norman's endorsement of Nikki Haley for president in 2024 and his votes (with other members of the House Freedom Caucus) against several pieces of legislation Trump supported on the grounds that they contained wasteful government spending. Most notably, Norman had initially refused to vote for Trump's flagship second-term policy, the One Big Beautiful Bill Act, which Graham used as evidence that Norman was insufficiently committed to advancing Trump's agenda. Norman campaigned around the state, arguing that he had acted against Trump's wishes only because Trump was insufficiently conservative on government spending.

==== Endorsements ====
Darline Graham

U.S. senators

- Tim Scott, South Carolina (2013–present)
- John Thune, Senate majority leader (2025–2027) from South Dakota (2005–present)

U.S. representatives

- Russell Fry, SC-07 (2023–present) and special primary candidate for this seat

Statewide officials

- Pamela Evette, lieutenant governor of South Carolina (2019–2027)
- Henry McMaster, governor of South Carolina (2017–2027)
- Hugh Weathers, South Carolina commissioner of agriculture (2004–present)

State legislators

- Davey Hiott, Majority Leader of the South Carolina House of Representatives (2022–present) from HD-4 (2004–present) (previously endorsed Fry)
- Tommy Pope, Speaker pro tempore of the South Carolina House of Representatives (2014–present) from HD-47 (2010–present)
- Murrell Smith, Speaker of the South Carolina House of Representatives (2022–present) from HD-67 (2000–present)
- 6 state senators (Note: Jason Elliott, SD-6 (2024–present); Michael Gambrell, SD-4 (2014–present); Stephen Goldfinch, SD-34 (2016–present); Josh Kimbrell, SD-11 (2020–present); Ross Turner, SD-8 (2012–present); Tom Young, SD-24 (2013–present))
- 24 other state representatives (Note: Bruce Bannister, HD-24 (2006–present); Gary Brewer, HD-114 (2022–present) (previously endorsed Fry); Case Brittain, HD-107 (2020–present) (previously endorsed Fry); Joe Bustos, HD-112 (2020–present); Paula Calhoon, HD-87 (2018–present); Micah Caskey, HD-89 (2017–present) (previously endorsed Fry); Don Chapman, HD-8 (2022–present); Heather Crawford, HD-68 (2012–present) (previously endorsed Fry); Gil Gatch, HD-94 (2020–present) (previously endorsed Fry); Val Guest, HD-106 (2022–present) (previously endorsed Fry); Charles Hartz, HD-81 (2024–present); Lee Hewitt, HD-108 (2016–present) (previously endorsed Fry); Bill Hixon, HD-83 (2010–present); Jay Jordan, HD-63 (2015–present); Phillip Lowe, HD-60 (2007–present) (previously endorsed Fry); David Martin, HD-26 (2024–present) (previously endorsed Fry); Scott Montgomery, HD-32 (2024-present) (previously endorsed Fry); Travis Moore, HD-33 (2020–present); Dennis Moss, HD-29 (2006–present); Weston Newton, HD-120 (2013–present) (previously endorsed Fry); Luke Rankin, HD-14 (2024–present); Robby Robbins, HD-97 (2022–present); Bill Taylor, HD-86 (2010–present) (previously endorsed Fry); David Vaughan, HD-27 (2022–present))

Local officials

- William Cogswell, mayor of Charleston (2024–present)
- 4 county sheriffs (Note: Duane Lewis, Berkeley County; Carl Ritchie, Charleston County; Jay Koon, Lexington County; Brian Wallace, Marion County)

Individuals

- Cody Simpson, state executive director of the Farm Service Agency (2025–present) and nominee for commissioner of agriculture

Organizations

- National Right to Life
- Susan B. Anthony Pro-Life America

Newspapers

- Washington Reporter
Ralph Norman

Executive branch officials

- Nikki Haley, former ambassador to the United Nations (2017–2018) and former governor of South Carolina (2011–2017)

U.S. representatives

- Mark Sanford, former SC-01 (1995–2001, 2013–2019), former governor of South Carolina (2003–2011), and special primary candidate for this seat

Statewide officials

- Curtis Loftis, treasurer of South Carolina (2011–present)

Individuals

- Duke Buckner, lawyer and special primary candidate for this seat
- Mark Lynch, appliance repair executive and regular and special primary candidate for this seat

Organizations

- CPAC
- Freedom Caucus Fund
- Students for Life of America
- Tea Party Patriots
Declined to endorse

Statewide officials

- Alan Wilson, attorney general of South Carolina and nominee for governor of South Carolina in 2026

==== Fundraising ====
Campaign finance reports as of August 5, 2026
Candidate	Raised	Spent	Cash on hand
Darline Graham (R)	$346,783	$95,351	$251,431
Ralph Norman (R)	$934,892	$697,553	$237,339
Source: Federal Election Commission

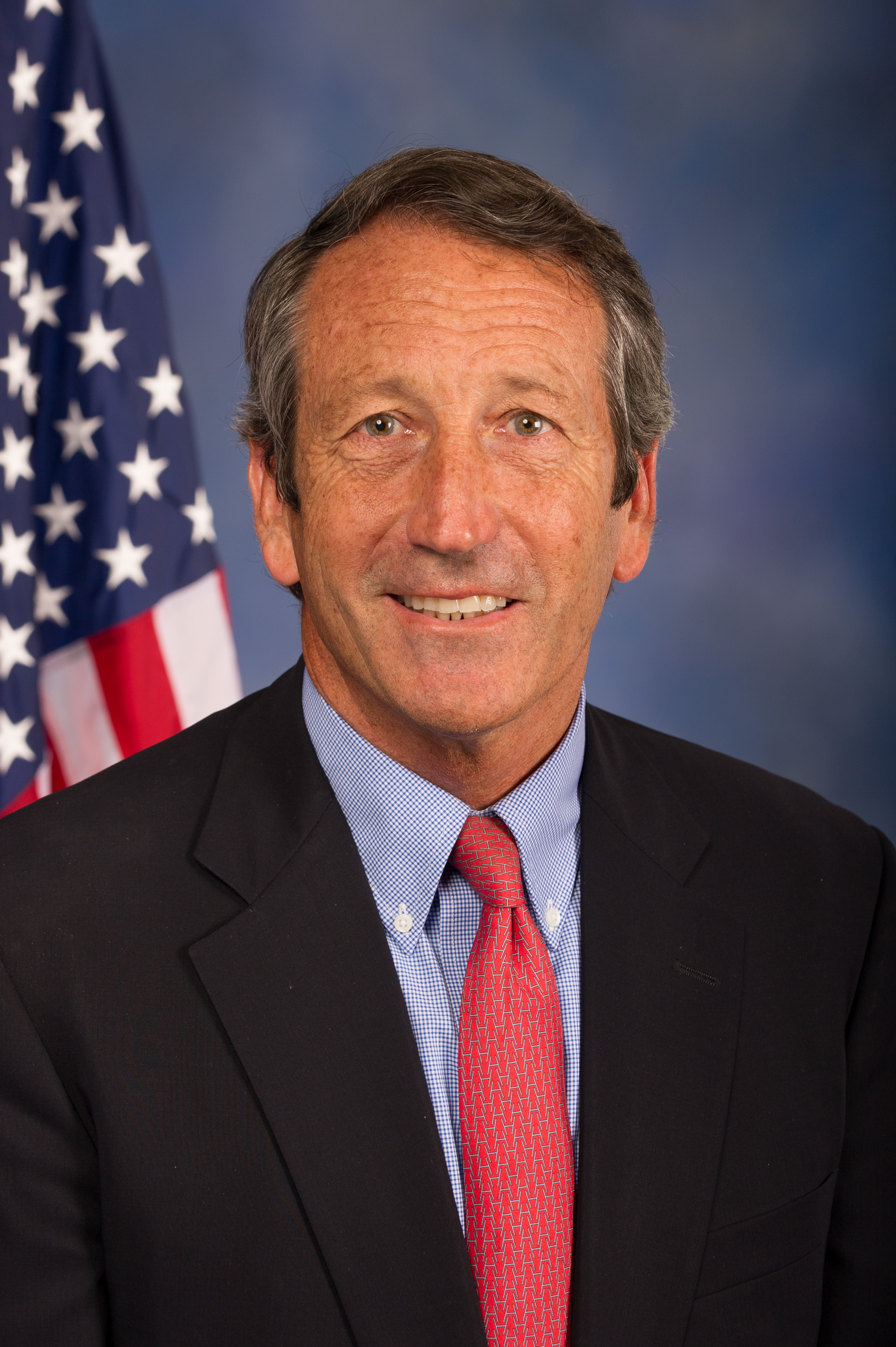
Former Governor and Congressman Mark Sanford came in fourth place in the Republican special primary election.

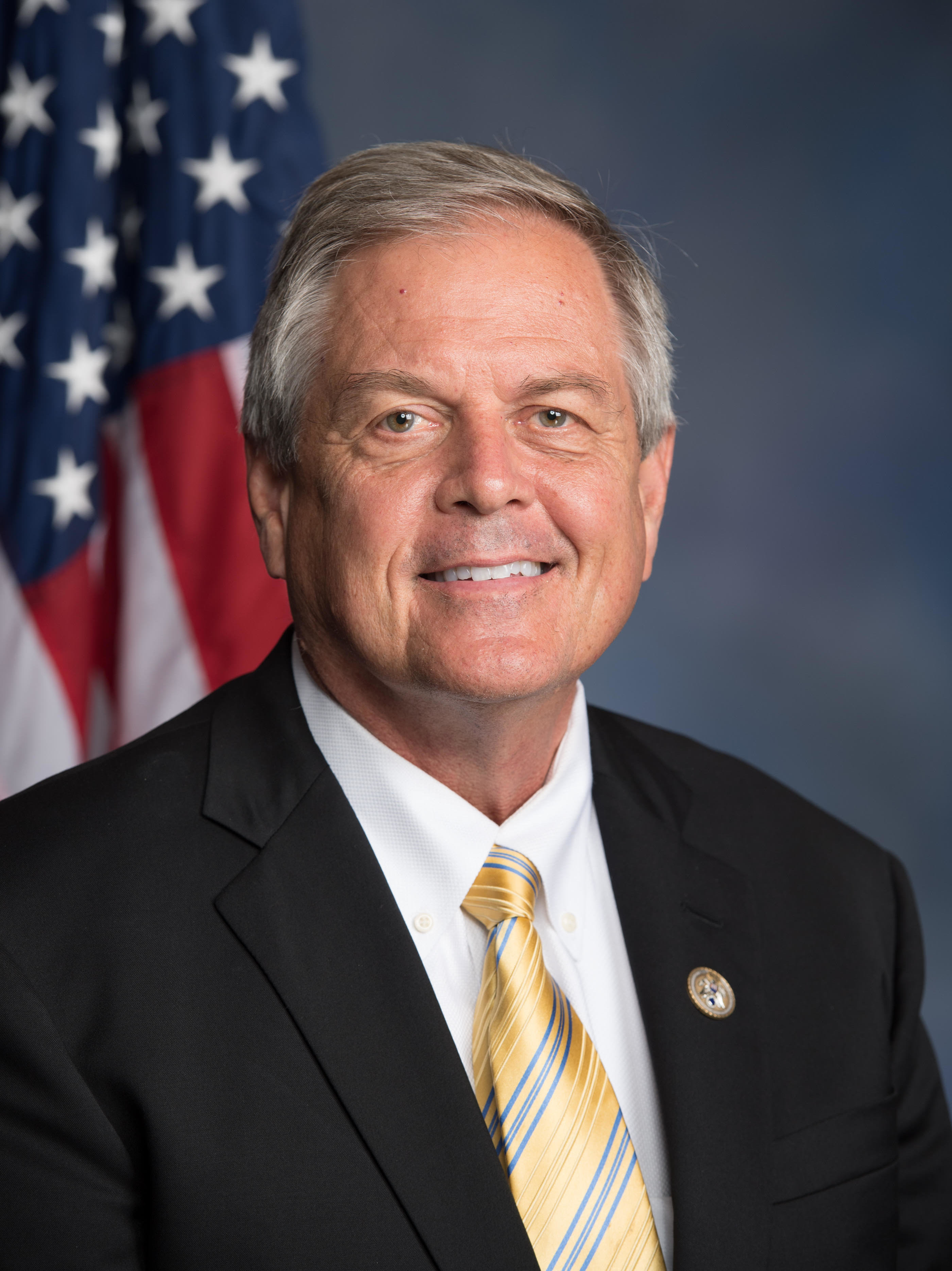
Congressman Ralph Norman competed against Darline Graham in the Republican special primary runoff.

==== Polling ====
Poll source	Date(s) administered	Sample size	Margin of error	Darline Graham	Ralph Norman	Undecided
Trafalgar Group (R)	August 22–24, 2026	1,031 (LV)	± 2.9%	48%	48%	4%

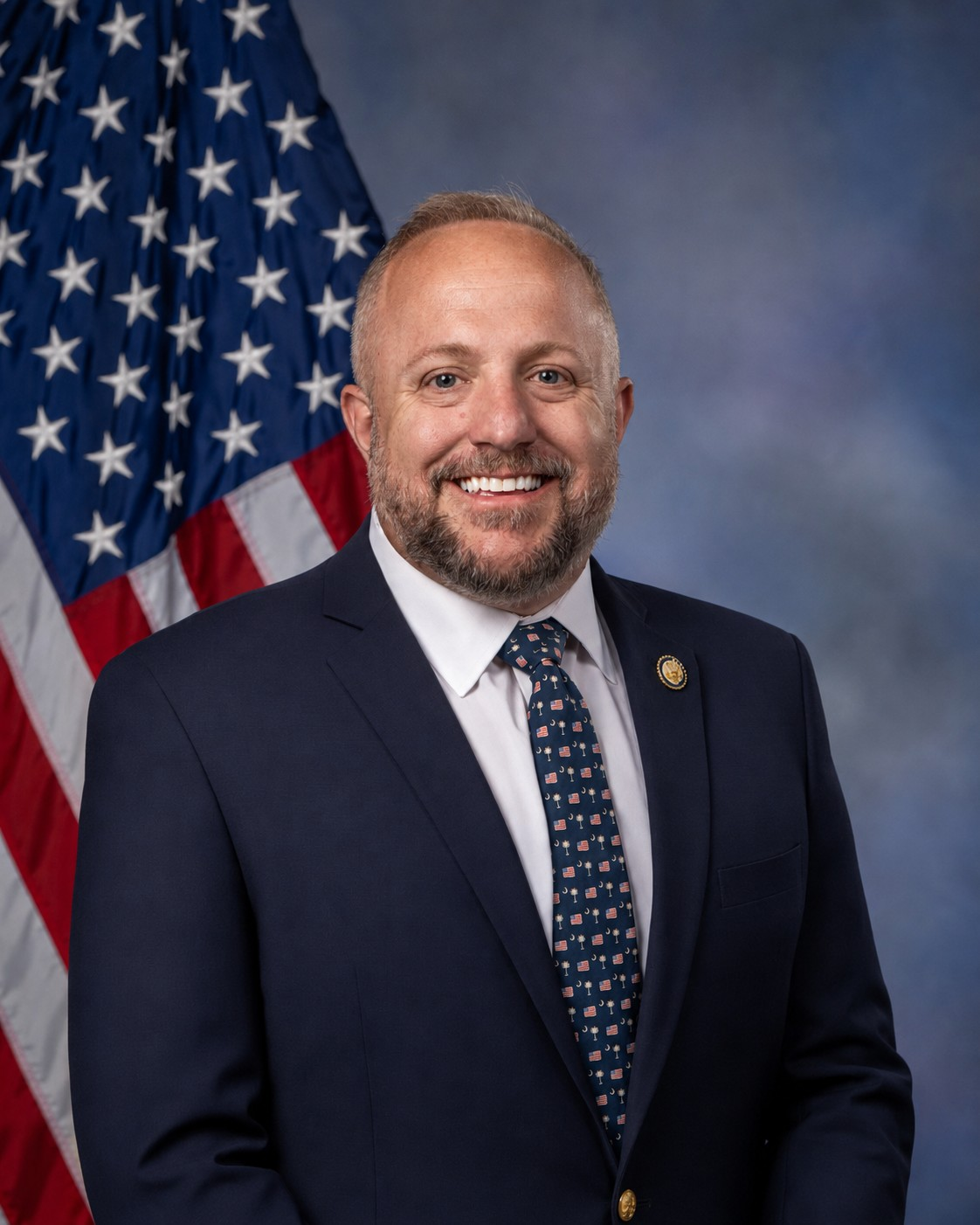
Congressman Russell Fry came in third place in the Republican special primary election

==== Debate ====
Republican special primary runoff debate
No.	Date	Host	Moderator	Link	Republican	Republican
Key: P Participant						
Key: P Participant					Darline Graham	Ralph Norman
1	August 18, 2026	SCETV; Newsmax	Greta Van Susteren; Van Hipp Jr. Gavin Jackson	YouTube	P	P

==== Results ====
Runoff results by county: Graham: 50–60%; 60–70%; 70–80%; Norman: 50–60%; 60–70%

Runoff results by congressional district Graham: 50–60%; 60–70%; 70–80%; Norman: 50–60%; 60–70%

Republican special primary runoff results
Party	Candidate	Votes	%
Republican	Darline Graham (incumbent)	193,486	52.4
Republican	Ralph Norman	175,412	47.6
Total votes		368,898	100.0

== Democratic primary ==
=== Candidates ===
==== Nominee ====
- Annie Andrews, pediatrician and nominee for South Carolina's 1st congressional district in 2022

==== Eliminated in primary ====
- Brandon Brown, former senior vice president of institutional advancement at Paine College and nominee for South Carolina's 4th congressional district in 2004 and 2018
- Kyle Freeman, logistics professional

==== Did not file ====
- Catherine Fleming Bruce, author and candidate for U.S. Senate in 2022 (did not file for the primary, ran as write-in candidate in the general election)
- Christopher Giracello, realtor

==== Withdrawn ====
- Lee Johnson, engineer

=== Endorsements ===
Annie Andrews

Individuals

- Jaime Harrison, former chair of the Democratic National Committee (2021–2025) and Democratic nominee for this seat in 2020

Organizations

- 314 Action Fund
- EMILYs List
- Joint Action Committee for Political Affairs
- Vote Mama
Catherine Fleming Bruce

Organizations

- National Organization for Women
- Run Sister Run PAC
Lee Johnson (withdrawn)

State legislators

- JA Moore, state representative from the 15th district (2018–present)
- Michael Rivers, state representative from the 121st district (2016–present)

=== Fundraising ===
Campaign finance reports as of March 31, 2026
Candidate	Raised	Spent	Cash on hand
Annie Andrews (D)	$6,519,296	$3,880,008	$2,639,287
Catherine Fleming Bruce (D) (Note: As of April 20, 2026, latest FEC report is for the quarter ending September 30, 2025.)	$0	$0	$5,030
Kyle Freeman (D)	$53,475	$52,239	$1,236
Brandon Brown (D)	$69,569	$20,369	$40,709
Source: Federal Election Commission

=== Polling ===
Poll source	Date(s) administered	Sample size	Margin of error	Annie Andrews	Brandon Brown	Kyle Freeman	Undecided
The Citadel	May 21–31, 2026	427 (LV)	± 4.7%	45%	14%	5%	36%

Hypothetical polling

Ralph Norman vs. Annie Andrews

Poll source	Date(s) administered	Sample size	Margin of error	Ralph Norman (R)	Annie Andrews (D)	Undecided
Public Policy Polling (D) (Note: Poll sponsored by Andrews's campaign.)	July 16–17, 2026	577 (V)	± 4.1%	43%	42%	15%

Mark Sanford vs. Annie Andrews

Poll source	Date(s) administered	Sample size	Margin of error	Mark Sanford (R)	Annie Andrews (D)	Undecided
Public Policy Polling (D)	July 16–17, 2026	577 (V)	± 4.1%	40%	41%	19%

Mark Lynch vs. Annie Andrews

Poll source	Date(s) administered	Sample size	Margin of error	Mark Lynch (R)	Annie Andrews (D)	Undecided
Public Policy Polling (D)	July 16–17, 2026	577 (V)	± 4.1%	38%	41%	21%

Russell Fry vs. Annie Andrews

Poll source	Date(s) administered	Sample size	Margin of error	Russell Fry (R)	Annie Andrews (D)	Undecided
Public Policy Polling (D)	July 16–17, 2026	577 (V)	± 4.1%	39%	42%	19%

Pamela Evette vs. Annie Andrews

Poll source	Date(s) administered	Sample size	Margin of error	Pamela Evette (R)	Annie Andrews (D)	Undecided
Public Policy Polling (D)	July 16–17, 2026	577 (V)	± 4.1%	41%	42%	17%

Trey Gowdy vs. Annie Andrews

Poll source	Date(s) administered	Sample size	Margin of error	Trey Gowdy (R)	Annie Andrews (D)	Undecided
Public Policy Polling (D)	July 16–17, 2026	577 (V)	± 4.1%	44%	41%	15%

Lindsey Graham vs. Annie Andrews

Poll source	Date(s) administered	Sample size	Margin of error	Lindsey Graham (R)	Annie Andrews (D)	Undecided
	July 11, 2026	Lindsey Graham dies				
Impact Research (D)	June 17–22, 2026	700 (LV)	± 3.7%	48%	45%	7%
Impact Research (D)	February 25 – March 1, 2026	700 (LV)	± 3.7%	47%	42%	11%
Public Policy Polling (D) (Note: Poll sponsored by 314 Action, which supports Andrews.)	November 21–22, 2025	704 (V)	± 3.7%	42%	36%	22%

Lindsey Graham vs. generic Democrat

Poll source	Date(s) administered	Sample size	Margin of error	Lindsey Graham (R)	Generic Democrat	Undecided
Public Policy Polling (D)	November 21–22, 2025	704 (V)	± 3.7%	41%	39%	20%

Nancy Mace vs. Annie Andrews

Poll source	Date(s) administered	Sample size	Margin of error	Nancy Mace (R)	Annie Andrews (D)	Undecided
Public Policy Polling (D)	July 16–17, 2026	577 (V)	± 4.1%	39%	42%	19%

Generic Republican vs. Annie Andrews

Poll source	Date(s) administered	Sample size	Margin of error	Generic Republican	Annie Andrews (D)	Undecided
Public Policy Polling (D)	July 16–17, 2026	577 (V)	± 4.1%	47%	39%	14%

John Warren vs. Annie Andrews

Poll source	Date(s) administered	Sample size	Margin of error	John Warren (R)	Annie Andrews (D)	Undecided
Public Policy Polling (D)	July 16–17, 2026	577 (V)	± 4.1%	36%	42%	22%

=== Results ===
Primary results by county: Andrews: 30–40%; 40–50%; 50–60%; 60–70%; 70–80%; Brown: 40–50%; 50–60%

Democratic primary results
Party	Candidate	Votes	%
Democratic	Annie Andrews	226,075	61.5
Democratic	Brandon Brown	110,962	30.2
Democratic	Kyle Freeman	30,374	8.3
Total votes		367,411	100.0

== Constitution convention ==
=== Nominee ===
- Mark Hackett, house painter

== Libertarian convention ==
=== Nominee ===
- Kasie Whitener, former chair of the South Carolina Libertarian Party State Committee

=== Eliminated at convention ===
- Jason Brenkus, motivational speaker

== General election ==
Cost of living, the economy, foreign wars, and the candidates' experience were the central issues for voters.

The seat was initially considered safe for Republicans as South Carolina is normally considered a strongly red state at the state and federal levels, but after Graham said during a primary runoff debate that "national security is not my thing,” some voters began to see her as inexperienced and unqualified, inflaming a divide between establishment and conservative Republicans who objected to Trump's involvement in the race, and the race became a contested tossup. A The New York Times/Siena poll found that "51 percent of the voters in the polls, including 18 percent of Republicans" said Graham "did not have the right experience to be an effective senator". In contrast, "54 percent of voters, including 22 percent of Republicans, said that Dr. Andrews did."

=== Predictions ===
Source	Ranking	As of
CBS News	Lean R	October 30, 2026
The Cook Political Report	Lean R	November 2, 2026
Decision Desk HQ	Tossup	November 3, 2026
The Economist (Note: The Economist's prediction model uses unconventional terminology. For the purpose of equivalency, their "Very Likely" ratings are formatted as a "Likely" rating while "Likely" ratings are formatted as a "Lean" rating.)	Lean R	November 3, 2026
FiftyPlusOne	Lean R	November 3, 2026
Fox News	Tossup	November 1, 2026
Inside Elections	Tilt R	October 29, 2026
MS NOW	Lean R	October 29, 2026
NBC News	Lean R	November 3, 2026
RealClearPolitics	Tossup	November 2, 2026
Sabato's Crystal Ball	Lean R	November 2, 2026
Silver Bulletin	Lean R	November 3, 2026
Split Ticket	Lean R	November 2, 2026

=== Post-primary endorsements ===
Darline Graham (R)

U.S. representatives

- Ralph Norman, SC-05 (2017–2027) and special primary candidate for this seat

Organizations

- Students for Life Action
- NRA Political Victory Fund
- National Right to Life Committee and South Carolina Citizens for Life Committee
Annie Andrews (D)

Executive branch officials

- Pete Buttigieg, former secretary of transportation (2021–2025)

State legislators

- Katrina Shealy, former SD-23 (2013–2025) (Republican)

Statewide officials

- David Beasley, former governor of South Carolina (1995–1999) and former executive director of United Nations World Food Programme (2017–2023) (Independent; former Republican)
- Jim Hodges, former governor of South Carolina (1999–2003)

Individuals

- George Will, journalist (Independent)

Labor unions

- National Education Association

Organizations

- Jewish Democratic Council of America
- National Women's Political Caucus
- Reproductive Freedom for All

=== Debates ===
2026 South Carolina U.S. Senate election debates
No.	Date	Host	Moderator	Link	Republican	Democratic	Libertarian
Key: P Participant A Absent N Not invited I Invited W Withdrawn							
Key: P Participant A Absent N Not invited I Invited W Withdrawn					Graham	Andrews	Whitener
1	October 11, 2026	South Carolina ETV; SCPR	Gavin Jackson	YouTube	P	P	P

=== Fundraising ===
Campaign finance reports as of October 14, 2026
Candidate	Raised	Spent	Cash on hand
Darline Graham (R)	$1,917,646	$1,283,216	$634,430
Annie Andrews (D)	$24,216,841	$22,507,375	$1,709,466
Catherine Fleming Bruce (W)	$18,989	$8,258	$10,731
Source: Federal Election Commission

=== Polling ===
Aggregate polls

Source of poll aggregation	Dates administered	Dates updated	Darline Graham (R)	Annie Andrews (D)	Other/ Undecided (Note: Calculated by taking the difference of 100% and all other candidates combined.)	Margin
270toWin	October 14 – November 1, 2026	November 2, 2026	47.4%	45.2%	7.4%	Graham +2.2%
Decision Desk HQ	through November 1, 2026	November 2, 2026	45.9%	46.0%	8.1%	Andrews +0.1%
FiftyPlusOne	through November 1, 2026	November 3, 2026	45.8%	45.8%	8.4%	Tie
RealClearPolitics	October 14 – November 1, 2026	November 2, 2026	48.0%	45.4%	6.6%	Graham +2.6%
Silver Bulletin	through November 1, 2026	November 3, 2026	47.2%	46.1%	6.7%	Graham +1.1%
Average			46.9%	45.7%	7.4%	Graham +1.2%

Poll source	Date(s) administered	Sample size	Margin of error	Darline Graham (R)	Annie Andrews (D)	Other	Undecided
Trafalgar Group (R)	October 31 – November 1, 2026	1,091 (LV)	± 2.9%	48%	46%	3% (Note: Kasie Whitener (L) with 2%; Mark Hackett (C) with 1%)	4%
Rasmussen Reports (R)	October 27–31, 2026	1,028 (LV)	± 3.0%	50%	47%	—	6%
Resonance Media Services (R)	October 30, 2026	600 (LV)	± 4.0%	45%	46%	3% (Note: "Other candidates" with 3%)	7%
Patinkin Research Strategies (D) (Note: Poll conducted for Project V.O.T.E.)	October 27–29, 2026	500 (LV)	± 4.4%	43%	48%	8% (Note: Kasie Whitner (L) with 3%; Mark Hackett (C) with 3%; "Someone else" with 2%)	—
New York Times/Siena University	October 19–26, 2026	707 (LV)	± 4.3%	48%	48%	0%	3%
Targoz Media Research (Note: Poll conducted for the South Carolina Policy Council)	October 16–25, 2026	895 (LV)	± 2.8%	47%	46%	3% (Note: Kasie Whitner (L) with 2%, Mark Hackett (C) with 1%)	4%
East Carolina University	October 19–24, 2026	955 (LV)	± 3.7%	51%	47%	2%	—
The Citadel	October 14–25, 2026	890 (LV)	± 3.4%	43%	39%	2% (Note: Mark Hackett (C) with 1%; Kasie Whitener (L) 1%)	15%
The Citadel	October 14–25, 2026	1,009 (RV)	± 3.4%	35%	40%	5% (Note: Mark Hackett (C) with 2%; "Not voting" with 2%; Kasie Whitener (L) 1%)	20%
Impact Research (D) (Note: Poll commissioned by Fresh Start SC, a super PAC supporting Annie Andrews)	October 15–21, 2026	800 (LV)	± 3.5%	44%	45%	5% (Note: Kasie Whitner with 3%, Mark Hackett with 2%)	5%
Trafalgar Group (R)	October 16–18, 2026	1,095 (LV)	± 2.9%	49%	46%	5% (Note: Kasie Whitner (L) with 4%, Mark Hackett (C) with 1%)	1%
Rasmussen Reports (R)	October 5–8, 2026	837 (LV)	± 3.0%	49%	45%	—	6%
InsiderAdvantage (R)	September 28–29, 2026	1,200 (LV)	± 2.8%	46%	45%	5% (Note: Mark Hackett (C) with 3%; Kasie Whitener (L) with 2%)	4%
Trafalgar Group (R)	September 23–25, 2026	1,087 (LV)	± 2.9%	43%	42%	6% (Note: "Other" with 6%)	9%
Rasmussen Reports (R)	September 14, 2026	1,006 (LV)	± 3.0%	48%	43%	—	9%
InsiderAdvantage (R)	September 8–9, 2026	1,200 (LV)	± 2.8%	45%	43%	3% (Note: "Another candidate" with 3%)	9%
Abacus Data	August 26–28, 2026	306 (LV)	—	55%	42%	3%	—
Abacus Data	August 26–28, 2026	500 (RV)	± 4.4%	47%	48%	5% (Note: "Another candidate" with 5%)	—
	August 25, 2026	Republican special primary runoff					
Impact Research (D)	August 18–24, 2026	700 (LV)	± 3.7%	41%	41%	5% (Note: Kasie Whitener (L) with 5%)	13%
Impact Research (D)	August 14–22, 2026	900 (LV)	± 3.3%	39%	42%	6% (Note: Kasie Whitener (L) with 6%)	13%

=== Results ===
2026 United States Senate election in South Carolina
Party	Candidate	Votes	%	±%
Democratic	Annie Andrews	1,044,001	51.14%	+6.96
Republican	Darline Graham (incumbent)	952,191	46.64%	−7.79
Libertarian	Kasie Whitener	23,585	1.16%	N/A
Constitution	Mark Hackett	16,811	0.82%	−0.48
Write-in		4,899	0.24%	+0.15
Total votes		2,041,487	100.0%	
Democratic gain from Republican				

==== By county ====
County	Annie Andrews Democratic		Darline Graham Republican		Kasie Whitener Libertarian		Mark Hackett Constitution		Write-in		Margin		Total votes
County	#	%	#	%	#	%	#	%	#	%	#	%	Total votes
Abbeville	3,415	37.84	5,364	59.43	111	1.23	110	1.22	26	0.29	-1,949	-21.59	9,026
Aiken	31,665	46.69	34,722	51.19	779	1.15	540	0.80	120	0.18	-3,057	-4.50	67,826
Allendale	1,952	77.86	533	21.26	9	0.36	13	0.52	0	0.00	1,419	56.60	2,507
Anderson	27,345	37.00	44,638	60.40	938	1.27	739	1.00	246	0.33	-17,293	-23.40	73,906
Bamberg	3,026	65.31	1,531	33.05	29	0.63	42	0.91	5	0.11	1,495	32.26	4,633
Barnwell	3,925	51.14	3,632	47.32	57	0.74	52	0.68	9	0.12	293	3.82	7,675
Beaufort	41,134	47.74	43,486	50.47	905	1.05	525	0.61	118	0.14	-2,352	-2.73	86,168
Berkeley	48,702	53.52	40,116	44.09	1,216	1.34	797	0.88	159	0.17	8,586	9.43	90,990
Calhoun	3,367	51.92	2,955	45.47	74	1.14	77	1.19	12	0.19	412	6.45	6,485
Charleston	108,745	62.10	63,034	35.99	2,080	1.19	926	0.53	336	0.19	45,711	26.11	175,121
Cherokee	6,074	34.42	11,149	63.17	163	0.92	185	1.05	77	0.44	-5,075	-28.75	17,648
Chester	6,258	51.94	5,509	45.72	124	1.03	124	1.03	34	0.28	749	6.22	12,049
Chesterfield	6,385	46.19	7,134	51.61	119	0.86	168	1.22	16	0.12	-749	-6.58	13,822
Clarendon	7,056	51.89	6,301	46.33	123	0.90	101	0.74	18	0.13	755	5.56	13,599
Colleton	6,978	50.87	6,391	46.59	151	1.10	169	1.23	28	0.20	587	4.28	13,717
Darlington	12,704	53.93	10,414	44.21	226	0.96	172	0.73	42	0.18	2,290	9.72	23,558
Dillon	4,796	54.38	3,920	44.44	35	0.40	59	0.67	10	0.11	876	9.94	8,820
Dorchester	33,317	53.49	27,361	43.93	873	1.40	631	1.01	99	0.16	5,956	9.56	62,281
Edgefield	4,593	42.45	5,972	55.19	127	1.17	101	0.93	28	0.26	-1,379	-12.74	10,821
Fairfield	6,105	63.08	3,391	35.04	91	0.94	73	0.75	18	0.19	2,714	28.04	9,678
Florence	27,638	56.45	20,444	41.75	448	0.91	363	0.74	70	0.14	7,194	14.70	48,963
Georgetown	14,649	47.31	15,832	51.13	259	0.84	189	0.61	38	0.12	-1,183	-3.82	30,967
Greenville	107,256	49.76	102,412	47.52	3,036	1.41	2,073	0.96	756	0.35	4,844	2.24	215,533
Greenwood	11,352	46.11	12,629	51.30	314	1.28	260	1.06	63	0.26	-1,277	-5.19	24,618
Hampton	3,905	58.66	2,659	39.94	42	0.63	43	0.65	8	0.12	1,246	18.72	6,657
Horry	63,282	38.55	98,567	60.05	1,188	0.72	919	0.56	195	0.12	-35,285	-21.50	164,151
Jasper	8,763	50.29	8,406	48.24	134	0.77	107	0.61	16	0.09	357	2.05	17,426
Kershaw	12,450	48.06	12,741	49.18	320	1.24	290	1.12	104	0.40	-291	-1.12	25,905
Lancaster	19,776	46.20	22,029	51.47	533	1.25	349	0.82	116	0.27	-2,253	-5.27	42,803
Laurens	9,472	40.46	13,277	56.72	286	1.22	285	1.22	90	0.38	-3,805	-16.26	23,410
Lee	4,269	67.45	1,957	30.92	42	0.66	52	0.82	9	0.14	2,312	36.53	6,329
Lexington	51,862	44.75	60,816	52.48	1,699	1.47	1,198	1.03	318	0.27	-8,954	-7.73	115,893
Marion	7,085	62.91	4,036	35.83	85	0.75	52	0.46	5	0.04	3,049	27.08	11,263
Marlboro	4,403	60.97	2,713	37.57	50	0.69	49	0.68	6	0.08	1,690	23.50	7,221
McCormick	2,518	46.03	2,829	51.72	50	0.91	61	1.12	12	0.22	311	-5.69	5,470
Newberry	6,135	42.61	7,874	54.69	191	1.33	145	1.01	53	0.37	1,739	-12.08	14,398
Oconee	10,698	32.92	21,037	64.74	390	1.20	281	0.86	87	0.27	-10,339	-31.82	32,493
Orangeburg	22,020	71.30	8,459	27.39	200	0.65	172	0.56	31	0.10	13,561	43.91	30,882
Pickens	15,155	33.83	28,279	63.13	718	1.60	460	1.03	183	0.41	-13,124	-29.30	44,795
Richland	122,537	75.77	36,458	22.54	1,633	1.01	824	0.51	273	0.17	86,079	53.23	161,725
Saluda	2,563	36.67	4,236	60.60	77	1.10	94	1.34	20	0.29	-1,673	-23.93	6,990
Spartanburg	55,303	46.22	60,916	50.91	1,590	1.33	1,397	1.17	438	0.37	-5,613	-4.69	119,644
Sumter	22,813	62.56	13,014	35.69	306	0.84	271	0.74	62	0.17	9,799	28.97	36,466
Union	4,050	42.99	5,116	54.31	103	1.09	111	1.18	40	0.42	-1,066	-11.32	9,420
Williamsburg	8,048	68.79	3,512	30.02	67	0.57	60	0.51	13	0.11	4,536	38.77	11,700
York	58,457	50.38	54,390	46.87	1,594	1.37	1,102	0.95	492	0.42	4,067	3.51	116,035

Counties that flipped from Republican to Democratic

- Barnwell (largest municipality: Barnwell)
- Berkeley (largest municipality: Goose Creek)
- Calhoun (largest municipality: St. Matthews)
- Chester (largest municipality: Chester)
- Colleton (largest municipality: Walterboro)
- Darlington (largest municipality: Hartsville)
- Dorchester (largest municipality: North Charleston)
- Florence (largest municipality: Florence)
- Greenville (largest municipality: Greenville)
- York (largest municipality: Rock Hill)

==== By congressional district ====
Andrews won five congressional districts, including three that elected Republicans, while Graham won two congressional districts.

District	Graham	Andrews	Representative elected
1st	45.72%	52.20%	Nancy Lacore
2nd	43.94%	53.82%	Joe Wilson
3rd	58.61%	38.74%	Sheri Biggs
4th	47.53%	49.70%	William Timmons
5th	48.58%	48.89%	Wes Climer
6th	27.90%	70.36%	Jim Clyburn
7th	53.07%	45.39%	Russell Fry

== Analysis ==
While Andrews benefitted from record-high turnout, primarily from Democrats, to flip the state, she was the only Democrat to win any of the statewide elections that year. Andrews won seven counties that Alan Wilson won in the concurrent gubernatorial election. Overall, Andrews won a total of 25 counties, several of which voted for Donald Trump by large margins in 2024, including Clarendon County. Extremely high turnout from Black voters in the state, nearly at the level of a presidential election, was also seen as instrumental in Andrews' win. South Carolina saw some of the largest Democratic turnout in the 2026 midterms, with Greenville, Spartanburg, and Lexington Counties having the largest increases in raw Democratic votes from 2024.

A sizeable number of Republicans voted for Andrews, according to The Washington Post. They reported that Andrews made "extensive and carefully plotted outreach to Republicans", and was a central part of why she won. One in ten voters who voted for Donald Trump in 2024 voted for Andrews, and as a result, she ran ahead of all seven Democrats seeking House seats.

=== Exit poll ===
2026 United States Senate election in South Carolina (CNN)
Demographic subgroup	Andrews	Graham	% of total vote
Ideology
Liberals	97	2	17
Moderates	71	26	40
Conservatives	15	83	43
Party
Democrats	99	1	27
Republicans	11	87	41
Independents	63	32	32
Donald Trump job approval
Approve	8	91	44
Disapprove	86	11	55
2024 presidential vote
Kamala Harris	98	1	43
Donald Trump	10	87	52
Gender
Men	45	51	45
Women	56	43	55
Income
$100,000 or more	49	48	34
$50,000-$99,999	49	49	39
Less than $50,000	58	41	27
Race/ethnicity
White	42	56	74
Black	85	12	18
White born-again or evangelical Christian?
Yes	21	76	29
No	64	35	71
Race by gender
White men	39	58	34
White women	44	55	40
Black men	73	25	7
Black women	92	6	12
Age
18–44 years old	66	29	25
45-64 years old	48	50	34
65 and older	45	54	41
Area type
Urban	62	35	10
Suburban	52	45	46
Rural	48	51	44
Education
College graduate	58	40	43
No college degree	46	52	57
Education by race
White college graduates	53	44	35
Non-white college graduates	78	21	9
Whites without college	32	67	40
Non-whites without college	78	18	17
Education by gender and race
White women with college degrees	59	39	19
White women without college degrees	33	67	27
White men with college degrees	47	49	16
White men without college degrees	32	66	28
Voters of color	78	19	26
Educational attainment
Advanced degree	58	39	19
Bachelor's degree	57	40	24
Associate's degree	54	44	12
Some college	47	51	20
Never attended college	41	57	25

== Notes ==
Partisan clients
