= Darline Graham =

American politician (born 1964)

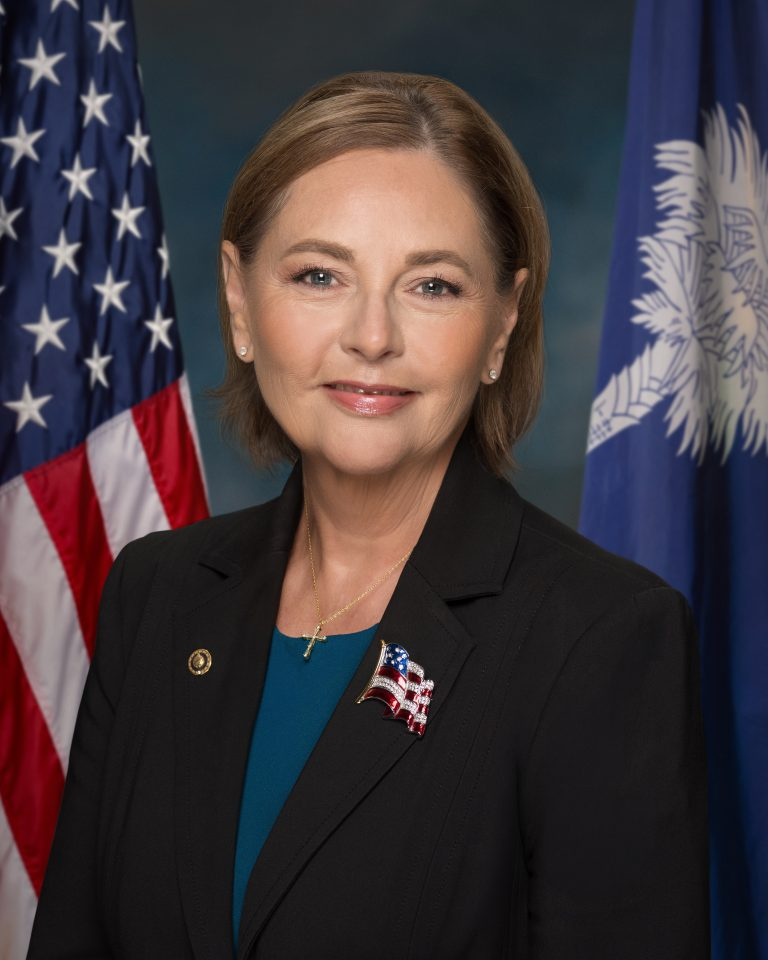
- Official portrait, 2026

United States Senator from South Carolina
- Incumbent
- Assumed office July 14, 2026 Serving with Tim Scott
- Appointed by: Henry McMaster
- Preceded by: Lindsey Graham

Commissioner of the South Carolina Commission for the Blind
- In office September 2019 – July 14, 2026
- Governor: Henry McMaster
- Preceded by: James Kirby
- Succeeded by: Luis Gamarra Mendoza (acting)

Personal details
- Born: Darlene Lettie Graham; June 12, 1964 (age 62) Central, South Carolina, U.S.
- Party: Republican
- Spouses: Terry Lee Boggs (div. 2003); Larry Nordone (m. 2006)
- Children: 2
- Relatives: Lindsey Graham (brother)
- Education: College of Charleston (BS); South Carolina State University (MA)
- Other names: Darline Graham Boggs
- Website: Senate website Campaign website
- Graham's voice Graham supporting the Lindsey O. Graham Sanctioning Russia and Iran Act of 2026; Recorded August 7, 2026

Darline Lettie Graham Nordone (born Darlene Lettie Graham; (Note: /ɡræm/ GRAM) June 12, 1964) is an American politician and public administrator serving as the junior United States senator from South Carolina, a seat she has held since July 2026. A member of the Republican Party, she was appointed on the recommendation of President Donald Trump to fill the vacancy created by the death of her older brother, Lindsey Graham. She is the first sister to succeed her brother in office in the history of the United States Senate. She is also the first woman to represent South Carolina in the United States Senate.

Graham was the Republican nominee in the 2026 United States Senate election in South Carolina, losing to Democratic nominee Annie Andrews in an upset.

== Early life and education ==
Darline Graham with her brother Lindsey at the 2015 Iowa State Fair

Darlene Lettie Graham was born in Central, South Carolina, on June 12, 1964. Her parents, Florence James "F. J." Graham and Millie Graham (née Walters), operated a restaurant, bar, liquor store, and pool hall, and the family lived in rooms behind the business. Her mother died of cancer when Graham was 11, and her father died of a heart attack 15 months later. After their deaths, Graham's brother Lindsey arranged for her to live with an aunt and uncle in Seneca, South Carolina. Before joining the Air Force in 1982, Lindsey, nine years her senior, became Graham's legal guardian. He taught her to spell her first name "Darline", a spelling she continues to use in adulthood.

Graham graduated from the College of Charleston with a Bachelor of Science in sociology in 1989. She earned a Master of Arts in rehabilitation counseling from South Carolina State University in 2009, and is a certified public manager.

== Career ==
=== Public administration ===
In 2007, Graham began working for the South Carolina Vocational Rehabilitation Department. She helped coordinate a remote work program for adults with severe disabilities for Time Warner. She was the department's public information director in 2015.

In 2019, Graham became commissioner and agency head of the South Carolina Commission for the Blind, which administers vocational rehabilitation, independent living, and blindness-prevention programs. She serves on the South Carolina State Workforce Development Board and its works management committee.

In 2026, Graham became president-elect of the National Council of State Agencies for the Blind. Her term is scheduled to begin in January 2027.

== Political career ==
=== Lindsey Graham campaigns ===
In 2002, Graham appeared in a television advertisement for her brother's campaign in the United States Senate election in South Carolina. She assisted him in subsequent campaigns, and discussed her childhood during the 2014 and 2026 Senate races. Graham supported her brother's campaign for president of the United States in the 2016 election, introducing him in his first campaign speech.

=== U.S. Senate (2026–present) ===
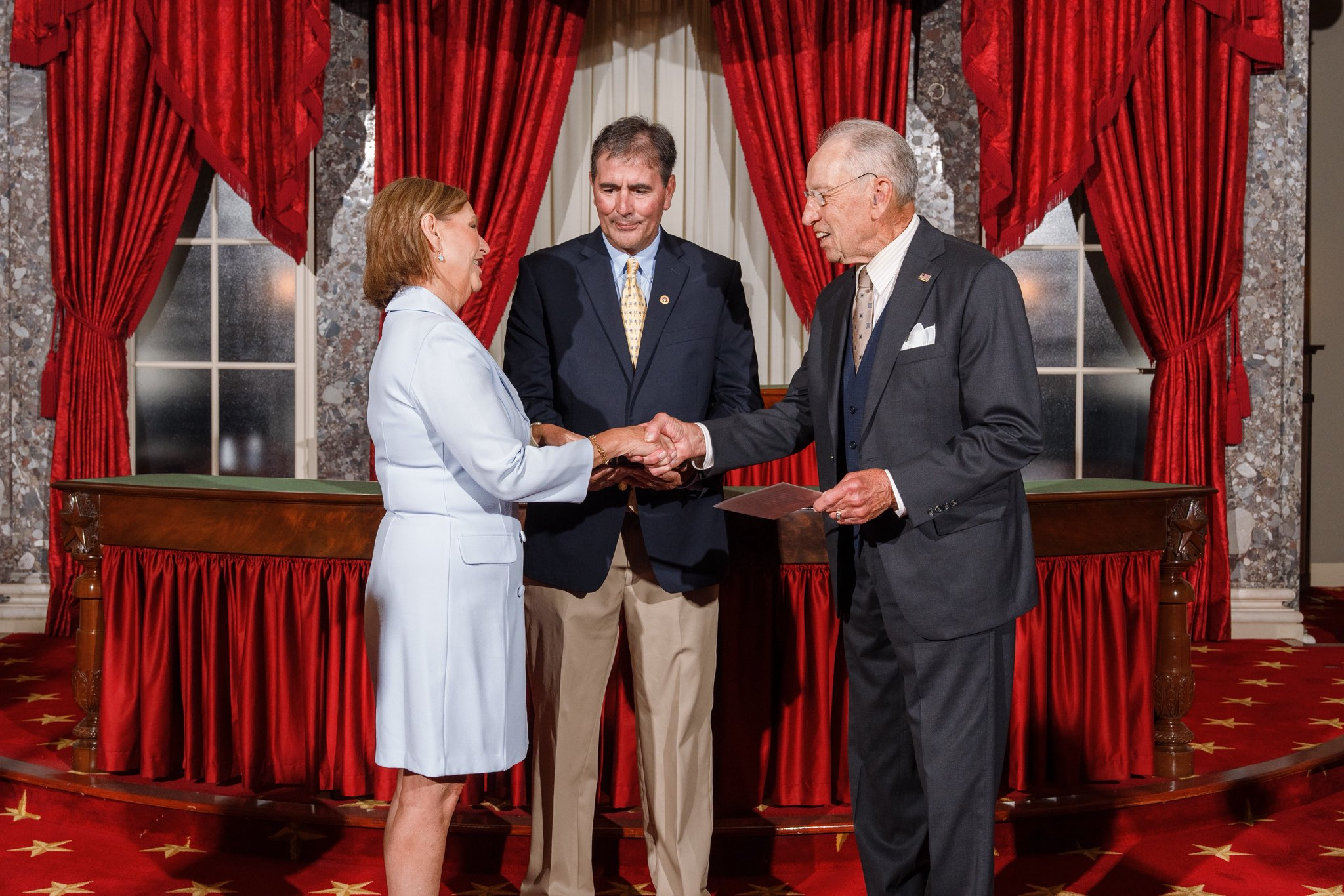
Graham was ceremonially sworn in by Chuck Grassley on July 14, 2026

==== Appointment ====
On July 13, 2026, South Carolina governor Henry McMaster appointed Graham to fill her brother's vacant Senate seat. President Donald Trump endorsed her the same day. Graham was sworn in on July 14, becoming the first woman to represent South Carolina in the Senate and the first sister to replace a sibling in the Senate.

==== 2026 election and debates ====
President Trump publicly encouraged Graham on July 17 to run in the 2026 United States Senate election in South Carolina and promised to endorse her if she did. Graham told Sean Hannity three days later that she intended to run for a full term. Graham came in first in the special primary election on August 11, advancing to a runoff with Ralph Norman. On August 25, Graham won the runoff, advancing to the general election against Democratic nominee Annie Andrews, Constitution Party nominee Mark Hackett, Libertarian Party nominee Kasie Whitener, and write-in candidate Catherine Fleming Bruce.

Most polls found Graham to be within the margin of error or slightly behind Andrews, but she remained a moderate favorite due to South Carolina's partisan lean and tradition of straight-ticket voting. On November 3, Andrews won the election in an upset.

After Graham said "national security is not my thing" during a primary runoff debate, some voters began to see her as inexperienced and unqualified. Trump's endorsement also inflamed a divide between establishment and conservative Republicans who objected to Trump's involvement in the race.

==== Tenure ====
Graham and Trump in the Oval Office after signing the Sanctioning Russia Act, September 18, 2026

On July 16, Graham introduced the Lindsey O. Graham Sanctioning Russia and Iran Act of 2026, legislation to impose sanctions on Russia. It is based on the Sanctioning Russia Act, a bill Lindsey Graham authored and supported, and had bipartisan support. It passed the Senate in August and passed in the House in mid-September with bipartisan support. President Trump signed it into law two days later.

Graham voted to confirm Todd Blanche as United States Attorney General.

President pro tempore Chuck Grassley appointed Graham to serve as presiding chair on September 10, 2026 and November 9, 2026. During these sessions, Graham opened floor proceedings, managed morning business, and recognized senators, including Majority Leader John Thune for post-election remarks on November 9th—while being addressed on the floor as "Madam President

==== Committee assignments ====
- Committee on Appropriations
  - Subcommittee on Commerce, Justice, Science, and Related Agencies
  - Subcommittee on Energy and Water Development
  - Subcommittee on Labor, Health and Human Services, Education, and Related Agencies
  - Subcommittee on Financial Services and General Government
  - Subcommittee on Military Construction, Veterans Affairs, and Related Agencies
  - Subcommittee on Transportation, Housing and Urban Development, and Related Agencies
- Committee on the Budget
- Committee on Environment and Public Works
- Committee on the Judiciary

== Electoral history ==
Republican special primary results, 2026
Party	Candidate	Votes	%
Republican	Darline Graham (incumbent)	109,881	32.8
Republican	Ralph Norman	82,627	24.6
Republican	Russell Fry	65,955	19.7
Republican	Mark Sanford	50,136	14.9
Republican	Mark Lynch	19,892	5.9
Republican	Danny Ford II	2,804	0.8
Republican	Duke Buckner	1,583	0.5
Republican	Glenda Gail Parker	977	0.3
Republican	Samuel Shepherd	931	0.3
Republican	Mark McBride	769	0.2
Total votes		335,555	100.0

Republican special primary runoff results
Party	Candidate	Votes	%
Republican	Darline Graham (incumbent)	193,486	52.4
Republican	Ralph Norman	175,412	47.6
Total votes		368,898	100.0

== Personal life ==
Graham was married to Terry Lee Boggs until 2003; they have a daughter. Graham married Larry Nordone circa 2006; they also have a daughter. They live in Lexington, South Carolina.

== See also ==
- Women in the United States Senate

== Notes ==
U.S. Senate
Preceded by Lindsey Graham	U.S. Senator (Class 2) from South Carolina; 2026–present Served alongside: Tim Scott	Incumbent
Party political offices
Preceded by Lindsey Graham; Deceased	Republican nominee for U.S. Senator from South Carolina (Class 2); 2026	Most recent
U.S. order of precedence (ceremonial)
Preceded by Alan Armstrong	United States senators by seniority 100th	Last
Preceded by Alan Armstrong	Order of precedence of the United States as United States Senator	Succeeded by Matt Meyer as Governor of Delaware
