= KCPM =

KCPM may refer to:

- KCPM (TV), a defunct television station (channel 27) licensed to Grand Forks, North Dakota, United States
- KCPM, a professional designation for Kentucky Certified Public Manager
- KNVN, a television station (channel 24) licensed to Chico, California, United States, which used the KCPM call sign from 1983 to 1998
- the ICAO airport code for Compton/Woodley Airport in Compton, California, United States
