= Annie Andrews =

American physician and politician (born 1980)

- Andrews in 2026

United States Senator-elect from South Carolina
- Assuming office January 3, 2027
- Succeeding: Darline Graham

Personal details
- Born: Anne Elizabeth Lintzenich; August 9, 1980 (age 46) Paducah, Kentucky, U.S.
- Party: Democratic
- Spouse: Charlie Andrews (m. 2011; div. 2024)
- Children: 3
- Education: University of Dayton (BS); Medical University of South Carolina (MS); University of Cincinnati (MD)
- Website: Campaign website

Annie Elizabeth Andrews (née Lintzenich; born August 9, 1980) is an American pediatrician and politician who is a United States senator-elect from South Carolina. A member of the Democratic Party, she defeated Republican incumbent Darline Graham in the 2026 United States Senate election, in what was considered a major upset. Andrews is the first woman elected to the Senate from South Carolina and the first Democrat to win a Senate election in South Carolina since 1998. She is to assume office on January 3, 2027.

Born in Paducah, Kentucky and raised in Indianapolis, Andrews received her Doctor of Medicine from the University of Cincinnati and a master's degree in clinical research from Medical University of South Carolina. She worked as a pediatric hospitalist at MUSC Shawn Jenkins Children's Hospital and was a professor of pediatrics at MUSC. Her medical career included research and advocacy concerning firearm injuries among children. Andrews was the Democratic nominee for South Carolina's 1st congressional district in the 2022 election, losing to incumbent Representative Nancy Mace.

== Early life and education ==
Annie Elizabeth Lintzenich was born on August 9, 1980, in Paducah, Kentucky, and grew up in Indianapolis, where she graduated from Cathedral High School. She received her bachelor's degree from the University of Dayton, where she was a member of Chi Omega sorority. She went on to earn her master's degree in clinical research from the Medical University of South Carolina, and her Doctor of Medicine degree from the University of Cincinnati. She later began work at the MUSC Shawn Jenkins Children's Hospital.

== Medical career ==
Andrews completed her medical residency in pediatrics in Cincinnati, Ohio, before moving to South Carolina's Lowcountry in 2009. She worked for 14 years at MUSC Children's Hospital in Charleston, as a pediatric hospitalist. She announced in September 2022, while running for Congress, that she was taking an unpaid leave "to protect myself and my colleagues". She resigned in June 2023.

As of mid-2025, Andrews worked part-time as a pediatrician in Children's National Hospital in Washington, D.C., but lived in Charleston.

== 2022 U.S. House of Representatives campaign ==
South Carolina's 1st congressional district (since 2023)

Andrews became interested in political activism after the Parkland high school shooting in 2018, which convinced her to join the gun safety advocacy group Moms Demand Action. She began doing clinical research into gun violence prevention to reduce the number of pediatric injuries from firearms. She described gun violence prevention as directly related to her work as a pediatrician. She announced her candidacy for South Carolina's 1st congressional district in November 2021; it was her first time running for political office. She won the Democratic nomination in June 2022 after running unopposed.

In September, the incumbent, Nancy Mace, began running campaign ads accusing Andrews of engaging in "child abuse" by providing gender-affirming care and surgery to minors. In a statement, Andrews responded: "I knew politics would be ugly but I never thought I'd see the day when my own congresswoman would accuse me—a pediatrician for over a decade—of 'child abuse' […] I do not support gender-affirming surgery for anyone under 18—nor does my hospital perform those procedures. What I support is evidence-based medical care, with parental consent, for teens struggling with gender identity issues […] Her vicious and disgusting attacks against me and LGBTQ kids puts them at an increased risk of targeted attacks and self-harm behaviors." Andrews also said that because of the ads, she would begin taking unpaid leave from her job as a pediatrician at MUSC Children's Hospital and would increase her personal security while she considered legal action, citing threats made against doctors earlier that year, including a bomb threat against the Boston Children's Hospital.

In October, Andrews was endorsed by the editorial board of the Charleston City Paper.

Andrews lost the general election on November 8, receiving 42.5% of the vote to Mace's 56.5%. She called Mace to concede soon afterward, and Mace responded by thanking her for "stepping into the arena". Andrews said she was unsure where her political career would go next, but that her candidacy had encouraged more medical professionals to follow in her footsteps by running for elected office.

In April 2023, Andrews announced the creation of a PAC called "Their Future. Our Vote".

== U.S. Senate ==
=== Elections ===
==== 2026 ====
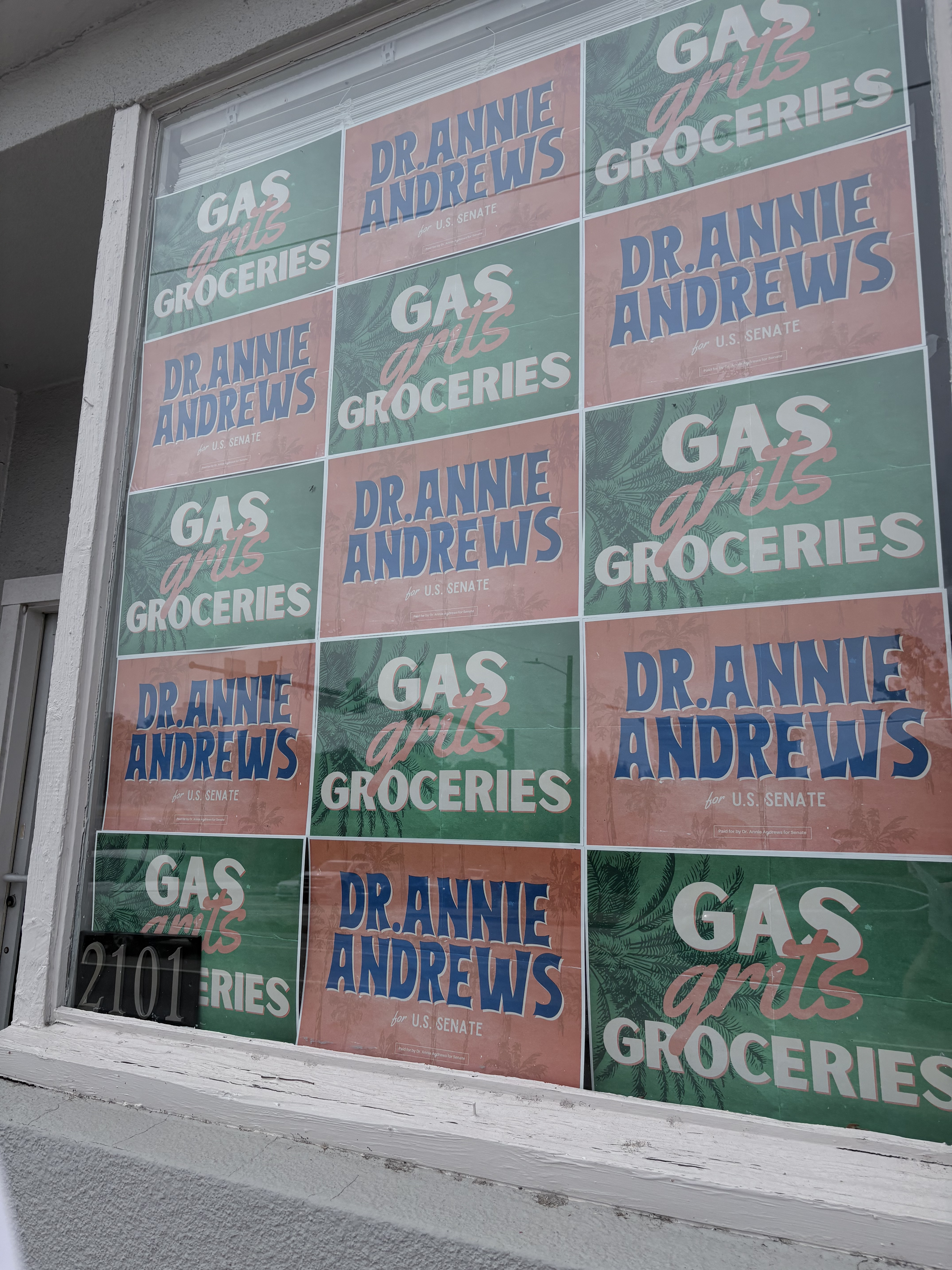
Andrews's field office in Columbia, South Carolina

On May 29, 2025, Andrews announced her candidacy for the United States Senate in 2026, aiming to unseat incumbent Republican senator Lindsey Graham. She said she decided to run for Senate after President Donald Trump appointed Robert F. Kennedy Jr. as Secretary of Health.

Andrews was endorsed by former Democratic National Committee chair Jaime Harrison, who ran against Graham in 2020. She was also endorsed by the 314 Action Fund, EMILYs List, the JAC, and Vote Mama.

On June 9, 2026, Andrews won the Democratic nomination, and was expected to face Graham. On July 11, Graham died, and two days later, his sister, Darline, was appointed to serve the remainder of his term. On August 25, Darline Graham won the South Carolina Republican Party nomination in a special primary runoff. Andrews faced Graham, Constitution Party nominee Mark Hackett, Libertarian Kasie Whitener, and write-in candidate Catherine Fleming Bruce in the general election.

Senator-elect Andrews orientation meeting in Washington DC with Senator Darline Graham, November 2026

On November 3, Andrews won the general election, becoming the first woman to be elected to the Senate from South Carolina. The seat had been in Republican hands without interruption since 1964, when Strom Thurmond switched parties. Thurmond retired in 2003 and was succeeded by Lindsey Graham, who held the seat until his death.

== Political positions ==
Andrews has called herself a pragmatic "radical centrist". She supports abortion rights and universal background checks while differing with some of the Democratic Party's positions: she supports strengthened border security, term limits, a ban on congressional stock trading, and Trump's "no tax on tips" and "no tax on Social Security" proposals.

=== Healthcare affordability and Medicare ===
In an October 28, 2026, interview, Andrews said: "I know as a pediatrician that prevention is actually a cost-effective approach to building a health care system. So the more folks who have access to primary care doctors for early diagnosis and treatment of diseases, the less our entire health care system is going to cost. My plan includes a public option, and a public option doesn't mean the government is paying for someone's health care. A public option means that you or I have the option to purchase an affordable public plan if we choose."

In an August 2026 interview on NewsNation, Andrews said she considered Medicare for All (single-payer healthcare) "a policy from a few decades ago". She explained, "I'm a pragmatic person. When you work as a physician, you have to be a problem solver. You roll up your sleeves, you solve the problem in front of you, you work with whoever you need to work with, you don't let perfect be the enemy of good".

Senator-elect Andrews meets during Washington DC orientation with Senior Senator Tim Scott, November 2026

Her priorities on the issue include reversing the Medicaid cuts in the One Big Beautiful Bill Act, (Note: During a 2026 campaign stop in Myrtle Beach, she said, "My number one priority is to stop the Medicaid budget cuts, because it'll be devastating to access to health care across the state. In South Carolina, rural life, those will close and also have a ripple effect on everyone in the health care system. And insurance premiums have already, in some cases, doubled and tripled...") restoring the enhanced Affordable Care Act tax provisions, and increasing prescription drug price negotiation under Medicare.

=== Reproductive healthcare and access ===
Andrews campaigned on reproductive rights and increasing access to health services. On her campaign website she wrote, "These decisions belong to women and families, not to politicians". She vowed to restore the protections of Roe v. Wade, guarantee access to contraception and infertility care, and expand maternal health services, especially in rural communities. She wrote, "No woman should have to leave her state or risk her life to get medical care".

=== LGBTQ+ rights ===
In an October 5, 2026, Truth Social post, Trump used anti-LGBT slurs against Andrews, calling her "Annie Tranny". Andrews is not transgender. The post was widely condemned. Several days after Trump's post, Andrews released an ad saying that she opposed "biological men playing women's sports" and would not allow "gender surgery for minors", contradicting a 2022 X post denouncing the Save Women's Sports Act, a bill barring transgender athletes from girls' and women's sports teams in public schools, as "shameful", saying she would "always support trans youth". Some in the transgender and LGBTQ+ communities expressed disappointment with Andrews' remarks.

== Personal life ==
In 2011, Andrews married Charlie Andrews, a neurological critical care doctor at MUSC. They have three children. Andrews filed for divorce in August 2023, and it was finalized in 2024.

== See also ==
- Women in the United States Senate

Party political offices
Preceded by Jaime Harrison	Democratic nominee for U.S. Senator from South Carolina (Class 2); 2026	Most recent
U.S. Senate
Preceded by Darline Graham	U.S. Senator (Class 2) from South Carolina; Taking office 2027; Served alongside: Tim Scott	Elect
