= Implementing the Lindsey O. Graham Sanctioning Russia and Iran Act of 2026 =

2026 executive order

Executive Order 14436
- Implementing the Lindsey O. Graham Sanctioning Russia and Iran Act of 2026
- Type: Executive order
- President: Donald Trump
- Signed: October 16, 2026

Federal Register details
- Federal Register document number: 2026-21599
- Publication date: October 21, 2026

Executive Order 14436, titled "Implementing the Lindsey O. Graham Sanctioning Russia and Iran Act of 2026", is an executive order issued by US president Donald Trump on October 16, 2026, that exempts Russia from the Lindsey O. Graham Sanctioning Russia and Iran Act of 2026, a bill of new economic sanctions passed by the US Congress and signed into law by Trump on September 18, 2026. The Order came days before the new sanctions were to take effect under the Act on October 18, 2026.

In a statement accompanying the order, Trump wrote, "I have submitted to the Congress a certification that the issuance of such a waiver at this time is in the national interests of the United States.

== Background ==
In early October 2026, Trump announced that the US agreed to purchase diesel from Russia in an effort to lower global energy prices.

On October 15, 2026, a bipartisan group of 22 United States lawmakers urged Trump to enforce the Lindsey O. Graham Sanctioning Russia and Iran Act of 2026 and terminate the diesel deal with Russia. In a letter sent to Trump, Secretary of State Marco Rubio, and Secretary of the Treasury Scott Bessent, the lawmakers wrote, "As Russia prepares to wage a fifth winter campaign against Ukraine, the United States has an opportunity to reinvigorate peace efforts by placing maximum pressure on Vladimir Putin and the governments and networks that finance his war."

On October 16, 2026, earlier on the day that the executive order was issued, Representative Gregory Meeks introduced the Prohibit Corrupt Russia Oil Deals Act, a bill to block the proposed diesel deal with Russia, revoking a general license issued by the Treasury Department that would allow the importation and sale of Russian diesel in the US until April 2027.

== Provisions ==
The executive order exercises Section 115 of the Lindsey O. Graham Sanctioning Russia and Iran Act of 2026, which allows the president to issue a waiver of sanctions and report to Congress "that the issuance of the waiver is in the national interests of the United States". The Order says, "As described further in section 4 of this order, I am hereby waiving the application of such sanctions, restrictions, and duties provided for in the Graham Act." The White House did not provide an immediate explanation as to how the waiver was in the national interest.

== Reception ==
The executive order was criticized by Democratic and Republican lawmakers. Senator Thom Tillis wrote, "What part of enforcing a law passed 86-11 by the Senate does the President and his advisors not understand? It’s unconscionable that this administration is capitulating to a Russian dictator who illegally invaded Ukraine and butchers innocent civilians every single day."

Representative Don Beyer wrote on X that, "Trump’s latest surrender to Putin again betrays our Ukrainian partners and defies clear congressional intent of legislation designed to punish Russia for its illegal war of aggression." Former State Department sanctions coordinator Daniel Fried wrote, "One week after the diesel deal and the Trump administration keeps the pressure off Russia."

On October 17, 2026, President of Ukraine Volodymyr Zelenskyy described the Order as a "reward" for Russian president Vladimir Putin, adding, "Unfortunately, the lifting of sanctions will continue, and I believe that the 'diesel deal' is the first step." He issued a social media statement in support of sanctions on Russia.
