= Joe Madge =

American politician

Member of the South Carolina House of Representatives from the 89th district
- Incumbent
- Assumed office December 2026
- Preceded by: Micah Caskey

Personal details
- Party: Democratic
- Website: https://joemadgeforsc.com/

Joe Madge is an American politician and engineer. He is a member-elect of the South Carolina House of Representatives, representing the 89th district. Madge, a Democrat, was first elected in 2026.

== Early life, education and career ==
Madge was born in New York state, and earned an Electrical Engineering degree from University of Pennsylvania. He has worked in Quality and Process Management.

== Political career ==
=== Party leadership ===
Madge has served as Chair of the Lexington County, South Carolina Democratic Party.

=== 2026 South Carolina House of Representatives election ===
On March 20, 2026, Madge filed to oppose Republican incumbent Micah Caskey in the November 3rd general election. Both Madge and Caskey avoided primary races, because they filed unopposed.

Madge held a lead of 101 votes ahead of Republican incumbent Micah Caskey, who in September had been elected to serve as House Majority Leader by his party. The Lexington County Election Board certified the results on November 6, with Madge at a 107-vote lead. The certified result being at or under 1% of total votes, a recount was triggered as required by state law.

After the recount was concluded, the South Carolina Election Commission confirmed Madge's victory over Caskey.
