= Bart T. Blackwell =

American politician

Member of the South Carolina House of Representatives from the 81st district
- In office November 14, 2016 – November 14, 2024
- Preceded by: Don Wells
- Succeeded by: Charles Hartz

Personal details
- Born: September 14, 1960 (age 65) Buffalo, New York, United States
- Party: Republican
- Education: College of Charleston (B.S.); University of Southern California (M.S.)

Bart T. Blackwell (born September 14, 1960) is an American politician. He is a former member of the South Carolina House of Representatives from the 81st District, serving from 2016 to 2024. He is a member of the Republican party.

== Political career ==
In 2024, Blackwell announced that he would not run for re-election. He was succeeded by Charles Hartz.

== Electoral history ==
South Carolina House of Representatives District 81
Year	Candidate	Votes	Pct	Candidate	Votes	Pct	Candidate	Votes	Pct	Candidate	Votes	Pct
2016 Republican Primary	K.T. Ruthven	1,357	42.6%	Bart T. Blackwell	848	26.6%	Chris Austin	622	19.5%	Jeremy O'Donnell	360	11.3%
2016 Republican Primary Runoff	Bart T. Blackwell	1,042	50.8%	K.T. Ruthven	1,009	49.2%						
2016 General Election	Bart T. Blackwell	16,781	100.0%									
2018 General Election	Bart T. Blackwell (i)	11,342	63.0%	Elise Fox	6,667	37.0%	Other/Write-in	8	0.0%			
