= 314 Action =

Political action committee

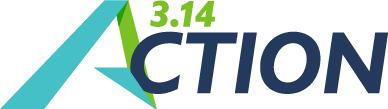
- Founded: 2016; 10 years ago
- Founder: Shaughnessy Naughton
- Type: Political action committee
- Registration no.: C00633248
- Website: www.314action.org

314 Action is a political action committee (PAC) that seeks to elect science, technology, engineering, and mathematics-educated Democrats to higher office in the United States.

The group gets its name from the first three digits of the mathematical constant pi (π).

== History ==
The organization was founded in 2016 by researcher Shaughnessy Naughton. Naughton is a business owner and a chemist who unsuccessfully ran for Congress as a Democrat in Pennsylvania's 8th congressional district in 2014 and 2016. She founded the group due to her worry about the election of Donald Trump and Trump's refusal to name any climate change experts to his cabinet, claiming that Trump is "anti-science".

314 Action has stated that the organization was inspired by EMILY's List, a political action committee that seeks to elect pro-choice Democratic women to public office. The express goal is to increase the number of STEM-educated Democrats elected to public office. They have stated that they will only support Democrats, and will refuse to work with or contribute to any Republican candidate. Citing the Democratic Party's support of green politics, Naughton stated, "We felt we had to pick a team" arguing that science cannot remain above politics because "politics is not above bringing itself into science". As of 2024, they have exclusively supported Democratic candidates and organizations supporting them.

In 2025, 314 Action announced plans to elect 100 new physicians to office by 2030. The campaign, "Guardians of Public Health" is co-chaired by Hawaii Governor Dr. Josh Green and Representative Lauren Underwood (IL-14).

=== 2020 elections ===
In 2020, 314 Action endorsed 19 candidates for the U.S. House and U.S. Senate.

In 2020, 314 Action stated their goal was to "shame" Republicans and their donors who did not take the COVID-19 pandemic seriously, particularly Ron DeSantis, Mike DeWine, and Greg Abbott. Resistance to mask mandates, social distancing, lockdowns, and mandatory vaccinations were cited.

=== 2024 elections ===
In 2024, 314 Action supported seven STEM candidates who were newly elected to Congress, including Rep. John Mannion (NY-22), Rep. Janelle Bynum (OR-05), Rep. George Whitesides (CA-27), Rep. Maxine Dexter (OR-03), Rep. Herb Conaway (NJ-03), Rep. Luz Rivas (CA-29), and Rep. Kelly Morrison (MN-03).

314 Action's contributions in Oregon's 3rd congressional district attracted criticism. They spent $2.2 million on ads backing Maxine Dexter in her bid to succeed Earl Blumenauer, who retired from his seat representing Oregon's 3rd congressional district. The Intercept reported that these funds were provided by the pro-Israel lobbying group AIPAC, which opposed one of Dexter's opponents, Susheela Jayapal. Both of Dexter's main primary opponents, Susheela Jayapal and Eddy Morales, alleged that 314 Action acted as a front for Republican and pro-Israel interests attempting to conceal their involvement in the election.

=== 2026 elections ===
In 2026, 314 Action endorsed over 500 candidates and spent $30 million. In the 2026 gubernatorial elections, it endorsed physician Amy Acton in Ohio and epidemiologist Nirav D. Shah in Maine. For U.S. Senate, they endorsed physician Annie Andrews in South Carolina and epidemiologist Abdul El-Sayed in Michigan. For U.S. House, it endorsed Amish Shah in Arizona's 1st district. It stated that it did not receive funding form AIPAC during the 2026 election cycle.

== Sources ==
- Astor, Maggie (January 13, 2019). "An Ocean Engineer and a Nuclear Physicist Walk Into Congress ..." New York Times.
- Goldberg, Emma (May 9, 2020). "Nightly Applause Is Nice, but Some Doctors Think Votes Would Be Nicer". New York Times.
- Harmon, Amy; Fountain, Henry (February 6, 2017). "In Age of Trump, Scientists Show Signs of a Political Pulse". New York Times.
- Koebler, Jason (January 10, 2017). "As a Response to Trump, This Group Is Drafting Scientists to Run for Office". Motherboard. Vice.
- Marks, Joseph (May 20, 2019). "The Cybersecurity 202: These political candidates are running on their cybersecurity expertise". The Washington Post.
- Mukherjee, Sy (January 25, 2017). "Scientists Gear Up to Run for Office In a World of 'Alternate Facts". Fortune.
- Yong, Ed (February 28, 2018). "Here's How The Scientists Running for Office Are Doing". The Atlantic.
