= Run Sister Run =

American political action committee

- Founded: 2018
- Founder: Tonya Ly
- Type: Federal Political Action Committee
- Purpose: Electing women to office
- Location: Houston, Texas
- Region served: United States
- Website: https://www.runsisterrunpac.com/

Run Sister Run is a United States federal political action committee founded in Texas in 2018 to "support women running for office and to help them win." The organization is noted for providing candidate training programs for women of color.

Tonya Ly, a founding member of the action committee, led the organization in mobilizing voter efforts for the Kamala Harris 2024 Presidential Campaign.

In addition to Harris, candidates supported by Run Sister Run include

- Catherine Fleming Bruce, 2026 United States Senate Election in South Carolina
- Gina Hinojosa, 2026 Texas Gubernatorial Election
- Tya Mathis-Coleman, 2026 Nevada State Treasurer Election
- Toni Rose, 2026 Texas House of Representatives
- Lauren Ashley Simmons, 2026 Texas House of Representatives election
- Charlene Ward Johnson, 2026 Texas House of Representatives
- Penny Morales Shaw, 2024 Texas House of Representatives

== See also ==
- Future Forward PAC
- Center for American Women in Politics
