= Lindsey O. Graham Sanctioning Russia and Iran Act of 2026 =

2026 act of the United States Congress

- Long title: An act to impose sanctions and other measures with respect to the Russian Federation, as championed by the late Senator Lindsey O. Graham, and for other purposes.
- Enacted by: the 119th United States Congress

Legislative history
- Introduced in the House as the Supporting Early-childhood Educators’ Deductions Act (H.R. 5334) by Jimmy Panetta (D‑CA‑19) on September 11, 2025; Committee consideration by House Ways and Means; Passed the House on April 27, 2026 (voice vote); Passed the Senate as the Lindsey O. Graham Sanctioning Russia Act of 2026 on August 7, 2026 (86–11) with amendment; House agreed to Senate amendment on September 16, 2026 (262–159); Signed into law by President Donald Trump on September 18, 2026

Major amendments
- S. Amdt. 6711, in the nature of a substitute (Note: this wholly replaced the originally-passed House bill to "turn it into" the Sanctioning Russia Act)

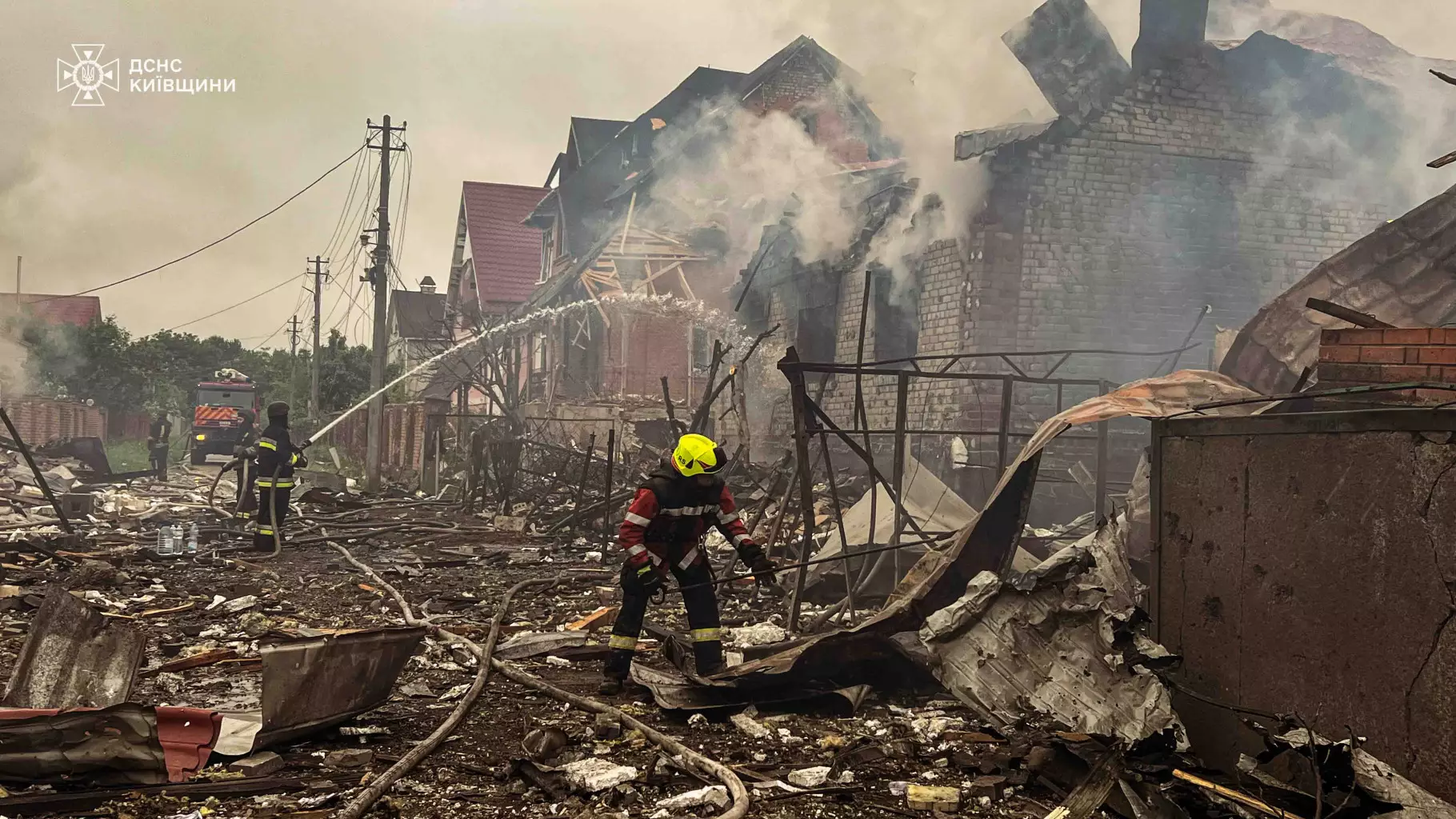
Residential buildings destroyed after Russian attack in May 2025

The Lindsey O. Graham Sanctioning Russia and Iran Act of 2026 (H.R. 5334), previous versions of which were referred to as the Sanctioning Russia Act, is a 2026 act by the 119th U.S. Congress that gives the president the option to impose extensive new tariffs and sanctions on Russia and countries that purchase Russian energy products and other critical exports, in response to the continuing Russian invasion of Ukraine and Russia's refusal to engage in peace negotiations.

The initial version of the legislation was introduced in the Senate by Lindsey Graham (R‑SC) and Richard Blumenthal (D‑CT), and co-sponsored by a bipartisan supermajority of 84 senators (out of 100 total). In the House of Representatives, a companion bill (H.R. 2548) was introduced by Brian Fitzpatrick (R‑PA‑1) with 151 bipartisan cosponsors (out of 435 total voting members).

After Senator Graham's death in July 2026, a renewed push to pass a version of the bill, renamed in his memory, led to a revised version being passed by the Senate on August 7 and then the House on September 16. It includes a 500% tariff on U.S. imports from Russia, and also allows the president to impose tariffs of up to 100% on goods from each of the top five importers from Russia of each of oil and natural gas. It also extends the Iran Sanctions Act by 5 years, to 2031.

Two days before the act was to take effect in October 2026, President Trump signed an executive order waiving the sanctions against Russia. No rationale was specified but it appeared to be part of a deal for Russian diesel fuel, which was in short supply globally due mainly to disruption caused by the 2026 Iran War.

== Background ==
Since the beginning of 2025, peace efforts led by President Donald Trump to resolve the Russian-Ukrainian war have repeatedly failed to achieve a peace treaty. Trump's approach was characterized as lenient toward Russia, with most of the pressure falling on Ukraine thus creating little incentive for President Vladimir Putin to compromise. As Trump conceded to more of Russia's demands, Putin refused to compromise and his conditions for ending the war expanded.

This negotiation strategy was widely criticized by members of Congress – particularly Democrats, but also a few Republicans. In response to continued Russian aggression, the Sanctioning Russia Act was introduced as a bipartisan effort to pressure Putin into serious and conclusive peace negotiations to end the conflict in Ukraine. According to a report by Reuters, "China and India account for about 70% of Russia's international energy business, which helps fund its war effort."

A particularly intense three-day wave of drone and missile attacks on Kyiv in May 2025 that killed at least 12 people helped galvanize support for the introduction of the bill. These strikes were part of a broader pattern of Russian attacks on Ukrainian civilians throughout the war, and their devastation and indiscriminate nature prompted action in the Senate.

In June 2025, Graham said in a television interview: "I've got 84 co-sponsors for a Russian sanctions bill that is an economic bunker buster against China, India, and Russia for Russia's brutal invasion of Ukraine." Donald Trump showed some support for the bill in his reposting of a Washington Post article on Truth Social. Senate Majority Leader John Thune said that senators "stand ready to provide President Trump with any tools he needs to get Russia to finally come to the table in a real way."

In July 2025, Trump criticized India over its continued oil trade with Russia despite Western sanctions. On July 14, he threatened tariffs and secondary sanctions on countries purchasing Russian oil if Russia did not agree to a ceasefire within 50 days.

== Measures ==
The act requires an increase in tariffs on all products from Russia, up to 500% ad valorem (on top of existing tariffs), unlike earlier versions of the bill, which covered other countries with the 500% provision also. It also requires an increase in tariffs up to 100% tariffs ad valorem (on top of existing tariffs) on 1. each of "the 5 largest importers, by total volume," of each of crude oil and natural gas "that originated in the Russian Federation during the most recent 12-month period preceding the date of the enactment of the Act" and "knowingly made new purchases of crude oil or natural gas that originated in the Russian Federation on a date that is on or after 30 days after the date of enactment of the Act", provided, in the case that it is a top-5 importer of natural gas, that it did not buy more than 15% of Russia's total exports in the 12 months prior to the enactment of the act and "has taken significant steps to reduce its imports of natural gas that originated in the Russian Federation" (a provision added to exempt Hungary and Slovakia); and 2. each of the top 5 countries "providing significant financial or other support for the purchase, loading, or shipment of oil that originated in the Russian Federation and is subject to sanctions; and engaging in any transaction, activity, or service related to a shadow fleet vessel that transported, is transporting, or is attempting to transport oil that originated in the Russian Federation and is subject to sanctions." Countries are required to be reassessed for eligibility under these criteria every 180 days. Tariffs on these countries can be changed to any positive value up to 100% upon a determination by the office of the U.S. Trade Representative of a significant change in behavior, at least 10 days after informing Congress of its methodology and "substantive rationale".

It also imposes sanctions on the Russian shadow fleet, imposes additional sanctions on Russian banks, further limits Russia and Russian entities from interacting with the American financial system and vice versa, and limits import or export of energy products to/from Russia.

Logistical Breakdowns of the Russian Shadow Fleet Operations
| Operational Category | Primary Logistics & Tactical Practices | Documented Details / Risk Profile |
|---|---|---|
| Operations Overview | Transport of sanctioned Russian crude and wet cargo while explicitly bypassing G7/EU price cap mechanisms. | ~1,100–1,400 active vessels (2026 estimate) managed via shell companies in Dubai and the Seychelles. |
| Tactical Deception | Mid-ocean Ship-to-Ship (STS) transshipment, deliberate AIS transponder manipulation, location spoofing, and radio blackouts. | Frequent "flag hopping" across registries including Gabon, Cameroon, Palau, Liberia, and Panama. |
| Geopolitical Hubs | Dense transit corridors passing through the Danish Straits, Baltic Sea, Gulf of Finland, and the Mediterranean Sea. | Principal international buyers include India, China, and Turkey. |
| Military Protection | Delivery routes secured via overt naval escorts by Russian Navy warships and tactical fighter jet coverage. | Primarily deployed along high-risk Baltic and Gulf of Finland shipping lanes. |
| Regulatory Risks | Operations using aging infrastructure (frequently vessels over 15 years old) relying on obscure, non-Western maritime coverage. | Elevated threat of catastrophic ecological oil spills; monitored by AI "Nordic Watchman" and NATO undersea patrols. |

There are exceptions on these provisions for humanitarian purposes, intelligence and law enforcement purposes, to comply with international obligations, to comply with civilian nuclear cooperation agreements, for certain imports of low-enriched uranium for nuclear reactors, for official government business, for non-Russian oil that transits Russian territory, for U.S. persons operating under a general license from the U.S. Treasury (Note: such a license generally exempts a person from sanctions), for good-faith efforts by non-Russian persons to wind down operations in or divest from Russia in the first 270 days after the act's enactment, for the safety of vessels and crew, and for space launches. Tariffs or sanctions provided for by this act may be waived upon provision of a certification to Congress by the president "that the issuance of the waiver is in the national interests of the United States" and a report explaining the basis therefor. Tariffs or sanctions provided for by this act may be terminated if, if concerning Russian persons or Russia, the president certifies to Congress that Russia has agreed to peace, and if concerning other parties, the president certifies to Congress that the party involved has stopped engaging in the conduct under scrutiny and "has received reliable assurances" that the party will not reengage in such conduct, and Congress does not pass a joint resolution of disapproval in response after a period of 30 days, or 60 days if the certification comes from July 10 – September 7 (roughly corresponding to when members of Congress are typically outside Washington); furthermore, tariffs or sanctions not provided for by this act may be terminated the same way, with the additional requirement that the president's report include "a determination of whether the termination is intended to significantly alter United States foreign policy with regard to the Russian Federation."

The act also extends the Iran Sanctions Act by 5 years, to 2031, sunsets the tariffs and sanctions authority 5 years after the enactment of the act, and includes the original SEED Act passed by the House that formed the legislative vehicle for the bill.

== Legislative history ==
On April 1, 2025, Senator Lindsey Graham (R‑SC) introduced the Sanctioning Russia Act in the Senate. The bill was referred to the Senate Committee on Banking, Housing, and Urban Affairs. The legislation has been co-sponsored by 84 senators, crossing the two-thirds threshold required to override a presidential veto. The scale of bipartisan support it has attracted is explained with the quick traction it gained given the growing frustration in Washington over Russia's actions related to the peace process.

The bill has been the subject of prolonged negotiations involving Graham, Senate leadership, and the Trump administration. Since its introduction, Graham has repeatedly suggested the measure was nearing a final vote, but those timelines have continually been delayed as Trump pursued unsuccessful efforts to negotiate with Vladimir Putin. In January 2026, Trump officially supported the legislation after a meeting with Graham.

Proposed measures in early versions of the bill included a 500% tariff on imports from nations buying Russian oil, natural gas, petroleum products, or uranium, along with expanded restrictions on Russian sovereign debt and financial transactions involving sanctioned entities.

President Trump after signing the Sanctioning Russia Act in the Oval Office, September 18, 2026

Graham’s sudden death on July 12, 2026, added momentum to the bill, as lawmakers from both parties rallied around the legislation as part of his legacy. A revised version, the Lindsey O. Graham Sanctioning Russia Act of 2026 (S. 5025) – not the same bill as the one that ended up passing the Senate – was introduced in July 2026 by Darline Graham (R‑SC), his sister, who filled his seat in the Senate after his death the same month. Trump urged Congress to add tariffs against Iran to the bill in late July. The Senate ultimately passed a version of the initial bill by an 86–11 vote on August 7. On September 16, it passed the House 262–159. 58 House Democrats voted for the legislation. On September 18, it was signed by the president.

== Reactions ==
Ukrainian President Volodymyr Zelenskyy supported the legislation and called it an "extremely powerful tool."

Jonathan Finer, former principal deputy national security adviser under President Joe Biden, said that the bill "includes no sanctions authorities the president doesn't already have, lets him off the hook with a waiver to avoid using them, and gives him enormous authorities to tariff U.S. partners and allies up to 100%, largely at his discretion."

An August 10, 2026, analysis by the Center for Strategic and International Studies wrote that the Act "gives Congress its best opportunity since 2017 to reassert a role in Russia sanctions policy."

== See also ==
- Tariffs in the second Trump administration
- International sanctions during the Russian invasion of Ukraine
- Government and intergovernmental reactions to the Russian invasion of Ukraine
- United States government sanctions
