= Charles Hartz =

American politician

Member of the South Carolina House of Representatives from the 81st district
- Incumbent
- Assumed office November 14, 2024
- Preceded by: Bart T. Blackwell

Personal details
- Party: Republican

Charles V. Hartz is an American politician. He is a member of the South Carolina House of Representatives from the 81st District, serving since 2024. He is a member of the Republican party.

== Political career ==
In 2024, incumbent Bart T. Blackwell announced that he would not run for re-election. Four candidates filed for the Republican primary: Hartz, Betsy Lamb, John Lewis and Mack Morris. Hartz defeated his opponents to become the Republican nominee.

Hartz faced Democratic nominee Jensen Jennings in the general election. Hartz defeated Jennings in the November election.

Hartz serves on the House Agriculture, Natural Resources & Environmental Affairs and the Regulations, Administrative Procedures, Artificial Intelligence and Cybersecurity committees.
