= Micah Caskey =

American politician (born 1981)

Member of the South Carolina House of Representatives from the 89th district
- Incumbent
- Assumed office January 10, 2017
- Preceded by: Kenneth Bingham
- Succeeded by: Joe Madge

Personal details
- Born: Micajah Pickett Caskey IV; June 2, 1981 (age 45) Columbia, South Carolina
- Party: Republican
- Education: University of Florida (B.A.); Darla Moore School of Business (I.M.B.A.); University of South Carolina (J.D.)
- Profession: Lawyer
- Website: http://www.micahcaskey.com

Micajah Pickett "Micah" Caskey IV (born June 2, 1981) is an American politician. He currently serves in the South Carolina House of Representatives, representing the 89th district. Caskey was first elected in 2016 and continues to serve the constituents of District 89. Prior to working in the South Carolina legislature, Caskey worked as the Assistant Solicitor (state prosecutor) for the 11th Circuit (2014–2016), and also served in the United States Marine Corps (2003–2013), earning the rank of captain.

== Early life and education ==
Caskey was born in Columbia, South Carolina, to parents Micajah III, and Rebecca Anne Caskey. He grew up in the Springdale, South Carolina, and graduated from Dutch Fork High School in 1999. While in high school, he earned Eagle Scout honors and was also a state champion wrestler. He attended the University of Florida on a full scholarship and graduated in 2003. Later, he attended law school at the University of South Carolina, where he also earned a master's degree in International Business.

== Career ==
=== Marine Corps (2003–2013) ===
A local contractor. Caskey (center) and an interpreter discuss the status of upgrades to a wheat distribution center in Afghanistan. Caskey facilitated the upgrade at the request of the district governor.

Caskey served as an officer in the U.S. Marine Corps. He earned the rank of Captain and commanded both company and platoon-sized units during his combat tours in Iraq and Afghanistan. For his service Caskey received numerous military awards including Navy-Marine Corps Commendation Medal, Iraq Campaign Medal, Afghanistan Campaign Medal, Global War on Terrorism Expeditionary Medal, NATO International Security Assistance Force Medal, Global War on Terrorism Service Medal, National Defense Service Medal, and Combat Action Ribbon.

Caskey left active duty to pursue graduate degrees in International Business and law at the University of South Carolina. Later, in 2009, Caskey volunteered to leave graduate school for a year to command a small team of specialized Marines in Afghanistan, his third combat tour of duty. Caskey's work in Helmand Province, Afghanistan was highlighted by New York Times Magazine writer Dexter Filkins in the article, "Stanley McChrystal's Long War".[5] He formally ended his service in the Marine Corps in 2013.

=== Assistant Solicitor (2014–2016) ===
In 2014, Caskey became a prosecutor in the 11th Judicial Circuit Solicitor's office , the equivalent of a district attorney's office, in Lexington County, South Carolina. There he prosecuted felony crimes, most notably, high-profile cases involving drug trafficking, child homicide, sexual assaults on children, and murder. Because the state constitution prohibits serving as a prosecutor and as a legislator, after being elected to the South Carolina House of Representatives in 2016, Caskey left the Solicitor's office and opened a private practice in West Columbia.

=== Private Practice (2016-present) ===
Caskey Law Firm, P.A. is a general law practice that focuses on civil litigation, Business Law and Constitutional Law.

== Political career ==
=== 2016 South Carolina House of Representatives ===
S.C. Rep. Caskey was elected to the South Carolina House of Representatives on November 8, 2016. On November 18, 2016, he was selected by other representatives to lead the Freshman Caucus.

Committee Assignments

Caskey served on the House Ethics committee. He chaired the House Rules committee and served on the House Ways and Means committee.

=== Nuclear construction debacle/utility company scandal ===
In the summer of 2017, in response to the VC Summer Crisis, Caskey led the formation of the bipartisan Energy Caucus. During the fall of 2017, Caskey was appointed by the Speaker to the House Utility Ratepayer Protection Committee. In the 2018 legislative session, Caskey remained vocal in criticizing SCANA and others. He helped lead the passage of H.4375, which repealed the Base Load Review Act, to stop SCANA from continuing to charge ratepayers and benefit from the failed project. The bill passed the House on January 31, 2017.

=== 2024 Election ===
Caskey had no Republican opponent and defeated Democratic candidate Wayne Borders in the general election.

=== 2026 South Carolina House of Representatives election ===
See also: 2026 South Carolina House of Representatives election

On March 20, 2026, Democrat Joe Madge filed to oppose Caskey in the November 3rd general election. Both Madge and Caskey avoided primary races, because they filed unopposed.

Madge held a lead of 101 votes ahead of Caskey, who in September had been elected to serve as House Majority Leader by his party. The Lexington County Election Board certified the results on November 6, with Madge at a 107-vote lead. The certified result being at or under 1% of total votes, a recount was triggered as required by state law.

After the recount was concluded, the South Carolina Election Commission confirmed Caskey's loss to Madge. As a result, the House Republican caucus will meet for new appointments to the Judicial Merit Selection Commission.
