= MUSC Shawn Jenkins Children's Hospital =

Shawn Jenkins Children's Hospital
- Medical University of South Carolina

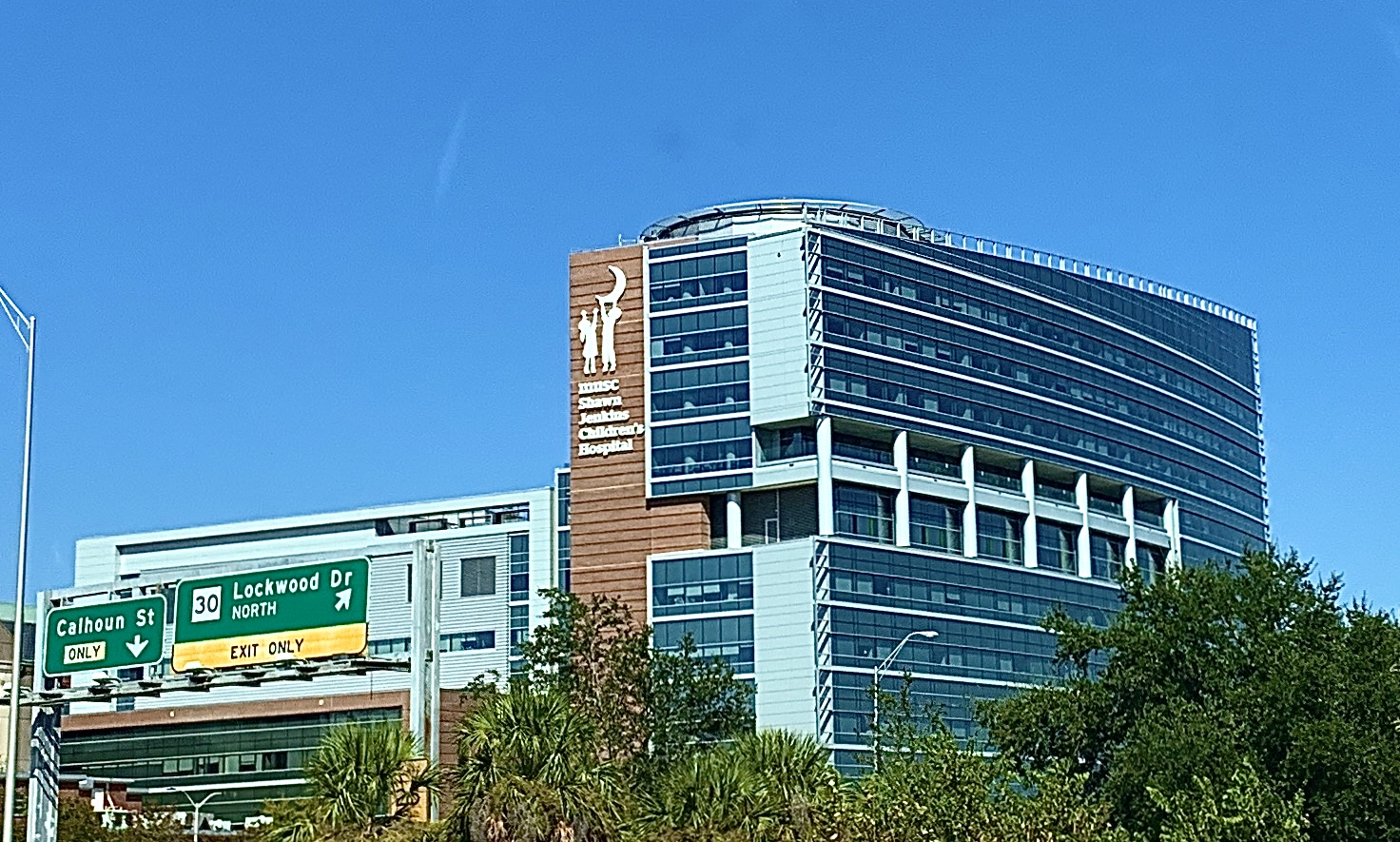
- The new hospital.

Geography
- Location: 10 McClennan Banks Dr, Charleston, South Carolina, United States
- Coordinates: 32.782455°N 79.951245°W

Organization
- Type: Children's hospital
- Affiliated university: MUSC

Services
- Emergency department: Level 1 Pediatric Trauma Center
- Beds: 250 Pediatric; 29 Women

Helipads
- Helipad: FAA LID: SC80
Number	Length		Surface
Number	ft	m	Surface
H1	65 x 65	20 × 20	mats

History
- Former name: MUSC Children's Hospital
- Constructed: 2016
- Opened: 2020

Links
- Website: musckids.org
- Lists: Hospitals in South Carolina

MUSC Shawn Jenkins Children's Hospital is a nationally ranked, freestanding acute care women's and children's hospital in Charleston, South Carolina. It is affiliated with the Medical University of South Carolina. The hospital features all private rooms that consist of 250 pediatric beds and 29 beds for women. The hospital provides comprehensive pediatric specialties and subspecialties to infants, children, teens, and young adults aged 0–21 throughout the Carolinas. The hospital also sometimes treats adults that require pediatric care. The hospital has a rooftop helipad and is an ACS verified level I pediatric trauma center, the only one in South Carolina. The hospital features a regional pediatric intensive-care unit and an American Academy of Pediatrics verified level IV neonatal intensive care unit.

Along with the main hospital in Charleston, MUSC Children's operates the ambulatory R. Keith Summey Medical Pavilion with 4 operating rooms and 2 procedure rooms.

== History ==
In July 1986, MUSC first established their pediatric transport program to transport critically ill children from around the region to the hospital.

The original MUSC Children's Hospital on Ashley Street began construction in 1982 and opened in 1987 to better serve children in South Carolina. The old 355,000 square foot hospital had 120 pediatric beds and 66 bassinets. Officials from MUSC have said that the old building that contained the children's hospital would probably turn into offices and new care areas for adults. The space has since been used to increase hospital space for COVID-19 patient surge.

In May 2011 it was released that aerospace company, Boeing made a donation of $1 million to the hospital to establish a center to promote healthy eating and habits to children in South Carolina.

In 2015 it was announced that tech executive Shawn Jenkins had donated $25 million to the fund for the new hospital, the same amount of the state of South Carolina. The hospital then named the new hospital "Shawn Jenkins Children's Hospital" to honor the large donation. When Jenkins made the donation he had no expectation that the hospital would be named after him. Jenkins is also sometimes a volunteer at the hospital and has helped make some design decisions.

Planning for the new hospital started a 17 years before construction and took input from patients, families, and medical staff in the design of the new building. Construction for the new MUSC Children's Hospital started in 2016 at an expected cost of $295 million. Plans for the new hospital consisted of 11 floors and 650,000 square feet of space, double the old. The design of the new hospital accounted for high winds up to 153 mph because South Carolina is prone to hurricanes and tropical storms that carry high winds. In original plans, the hospital was set to open in 2019 but the opening date was delayed several times due to a number of factors including contractors missing deadlines, failed inspections, minor leaks, and emergency generator malfunctions.

On Saturday February 22, 2020, roads between the old children's hospital and Shawn Jenkins Children's Hospital were closed in preparation of transports of patients from the old to the new. In total, 36 ambulances delivered 153 children and expectant mothers to the new hospital.

In November 2020, Dwayne "The Rock" Johnson collaborated with Microsoft and billionaire Bill Gates to donate Xbox Series X consoles to the Shawn Jenkins Children's Hospital along with 19 other children's hospitals throughout the country.

== About ==
The hospital has an advanced, nationally ranked, pediatric cardiology program that treats children and adults of all ages through its adult congenital heart program. The pediatric cardiology program started in 1967 when MUSC hired their first pediatric cardiology surgeon.

The new hospital also includes many amenities that the old hospital lacked including rooftop and indoor play areas, balconies for patients and families to relax, open and bright atrium, and mother-baby patient rooms, hallways filled with artwork, and bright colors all around. Most rooms also enjoy expansive views of the Ashley River. The hospital also included a rooftop helipad to better handle critical care events and to take in critical trauma patients from surrounding regions and also includes a burn center, the only of such in South Carolina.

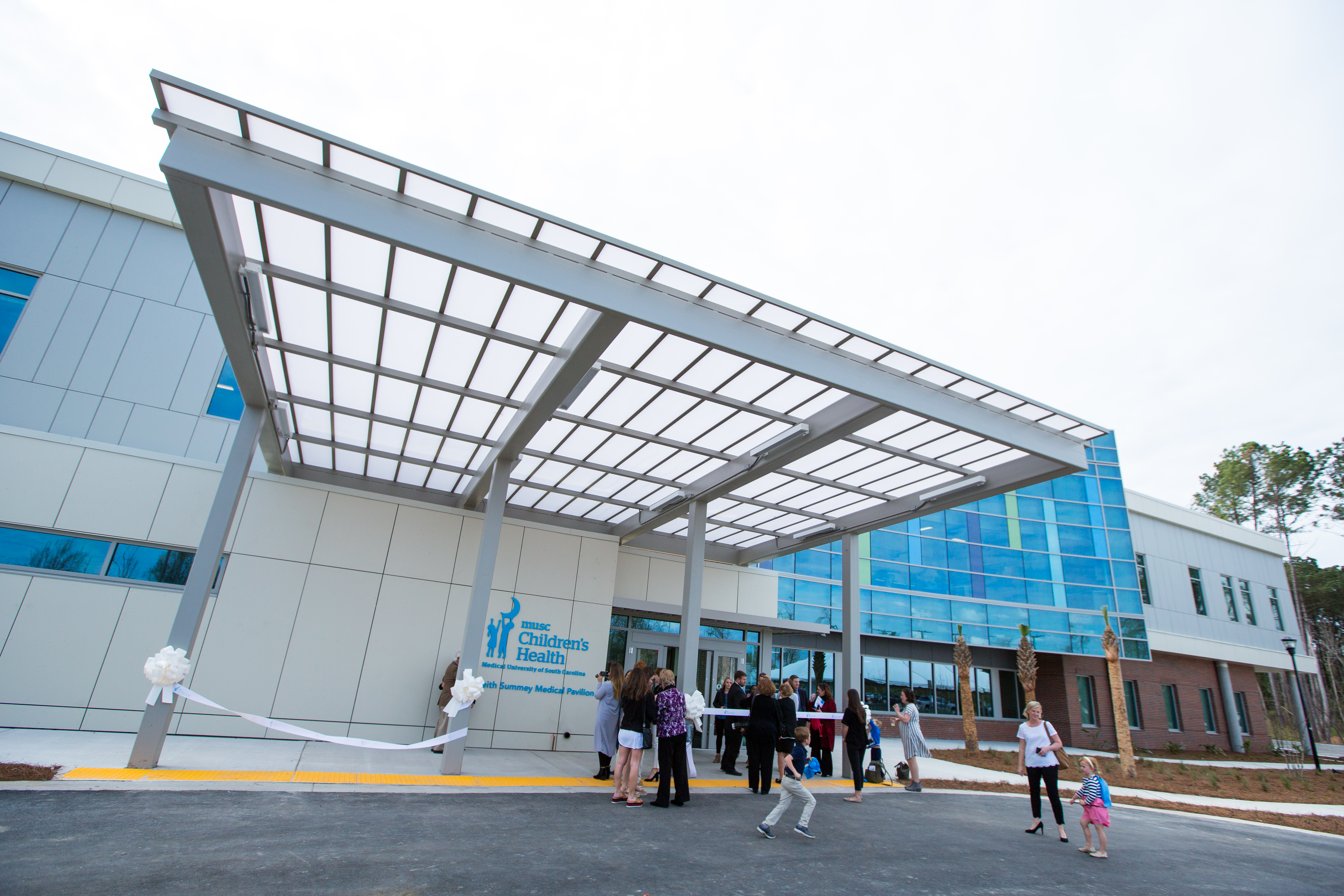
The MUSC Children's Health R. Keith Summey Medical Pavilion opens to offer pediatric services in a location that offers convenient and enhanced access to the children and families of South Carolina.

In partnership with MUSC's adult hospital, Shawn Jenkins Children's operates a cystic fibrosis care center for children, teens, and young adults.

The hospital features an 86-bed AAP verified level 4 neonatal intensive care unit, the highest in South Carolina and surrounding states.

In 2020, following the advice of the CDC, the hospital limited the number of visitors patients could have in response to the 2019-20 Covid Pandemic. The hospital limited visitors to only two parent or guardians for children and one significant other for pregnant women.

== Awards ==
The hospital, along with its parent organization (MUSC) has received the Magnet recognition from the American Nurse Credentialing Center in 2015 and 2020.

In September 2020 the hospital received a 2020 Healthcare Design Showcase: Award of Merit due to the advanced design.

As of 2021 MUSC Shawn Jenkins Children's Hospital has placed nationally in 4 different ranked pediatric specialties on the U.S. News & World Report and ranked as the best children's hospital in South Carolina.

2021 U.S. News & World Report Rankings for MUSC Shawn Jenkins Children's Hospital
Specialty	Rank (In the U.S.)	Score (Out of 100)
Pediatric Cancer	#44	72.3
Pediatric Cardiology & Heart Surgery	#10	84.6
Pediatric Gastroenterology & GI Surgery	#43	67.9
Pediatric Nephrology	#30	71.5

2022 U.S. News & World Report Rankings for MUSC Shawn Jenkins Children's Hospital
Specialty	Rank (In the U.S.)	Score (Out of 100)
Pediatric Cancer	#	
Pediatric Cardiology & Heart Surgery	#4	
Pediatric Gastroenterology & GI Surgery	#	
Pediatric Nephrology	#	

== See also ==
- List of children's hospitals in the United States
- Medical University of South Carolina
- Women's health
