= Certified Public Manager =

U.S. professional designation

The Certified Public Manager (CPM) is a United States professional designation established in 1979 for the purpose of improving performance and advancing best practice standards for public sector managers. The CPM is a comprehensive management development program based upon a selected set of competencies. The CPM is awarded upon completion of a CPM program accredited by the National Certified Public Manager Consortium. CPM graduates come from public, private, and non-profit career fields. The words "certified public manager" are registered service marks by the U.S. Patent and Trademark Office.

== Requirements ==
Requirements for the CPM vary by program, but all require at least 300 hours of training, including classes, application projects, structured readings, and examinations. Each CPM candidate is required to pass a series of courses centering on various management principles. The courses are designed around a set of core competencies and each CPM program requires an evaluation of all major curricular competencies.

=== Curriculum competencies ===
The following competencies are present in all CPM curriculum:

Competency	Description
Personal and Organizational Integrity	Increasing awareness, building skills and modeling behaviors related to identifying potential ethical problems and conflicts of interest; appropriate workplace behavior; and legal policy
Managing Work	Meeting organizational goals through effective planning, prioritizing, organizing and aligning human, financial, material, and information resources. Empowering others by delegating clear job expectations; providing meaningful feedback and coaching; creating a motivational environment and measuring performance. Monitoring workloads and documenting performance. Dealing effectively with performance problems.
Leading People	Inspiring others to positive action through a clear vision; promotes a diverse workforce. Encouraging and facilitating cooperation, pride, trust, and group identity; fostering commitment and team spirit. Articulating vision, ideas, and facts in a clear and organized way; effectively managing emotions and impulses.
Developing Self	Demonstrating commitment to continuous learning, self-awareness, and individual performance planning through feedback, study, and analysis.
Systemic Integration	Approaching planning, decision making, and implementation from an enterprise perspective; understanding internal and external relationships that impact the organization.
Public Service Focus	Delivering superior services to the public and internal and external recipients; including customer/client identification expectations, needs, and developing and implementing paradigms, processes, and procedures that exude a positive spirit; demonstrating agency and personal commitment to quality.
Change Leadership	Acting as a change agent; initiating and supporting change within the organization by implementing strategies to help others adapt to changes in the work environment, including personal reactions to change; emphasizing and fostering creativity and innovation; being proactive.

== History ==
The idea for the CPM began in the early 1970s at the University of Georgia with the realization that the state was experiencing explosive growth in information and knowledge, significant new social legislation, and rapidly altering social values. During this time the Carl Vinson Institute of Government and the Georgia Merit System were offering management training to public employees. It was recognized that these two organizations were offering duplications of training in some areas of management and were failing to meet the needs of other management areas. In 1974 University of Georgia’s Institute of Government, the Georgia Center for Continuing Education, and the Georgia State Merit System for Personnel Administration convened to discuss ways to broaden and refine Georgia state management training programs to meet the challenges of rapid change in the state and society. A consensus was reached that management in the state government needed to become more professional.

Ken Henning is considered the father of the CPM. He observed that most state training programs consisted of separate courses in which content was varied and lacked consistent focus. Henning felt that an integrated program would achieve a more organized approach to competencies needed by management. The CPM program was modeled after the CPA program, consisting of the creation of a coordinated program addressing specific and various training needs relevant to management as well as with content involving study and preparation, practice and application of learning, examination, and prestigious recognition. The CPM would also involve the eventual creation of the American Academy of Certified Public Managers similar to the American Institute of Certified Public Accountants as a central capstone organization.

Planners believed that awarding certificates of attendance were insufficient in the creation of a program based on quality. Early planners for the CPM determined that an innovative and rigorous program of study, application of knowledge, examination, and certification should be developed. University courses and the Georgia Merit System collaborated to reduce training duplication, and maximize efforts. Initially a program was developed in which six courses would be taught, three by the Georgia Merit System and three by the University of Georgia. After a series of meetings, two long-term goals for the CPM were created:

- To achieve and subsequently to maintain a level of national recognition for the CPM designation similar to that accorded the Certified Public Accountant (CPA) designation; and
- To foster and encourage the highest possible levels of competence and ethical practice by managers in state and other levels of government through a national body of professionally trained and oriented Certified Public Managers.

After gathering strong support for the CPM program from the governor, legislative leadership, top management of state agencies, University of Georgia, regional intergovernmental personnel assistance (IPA) offices of the U.S. Civil Service Commission, the University of Georgia’s Institute for Government and Center for Continuing Education and the Georgia State Merit System of Personnel Administration co-authored a detailed proposal.

February 9, 1976 the Georgia House of Representatives passed Resolution Act No. 97 in response to Governor Busbee’s request authorizing and directing the State Personnel Board and the State Merit System of Personnel Administration to implement the Certified Public Manager Program in the State Government of Georgia. On February 19, 1976 the Senate adopted the resolution and the legislature unanimously passed the resolution on February 26, 1976. On March 1, 1976 the CPM was formally established.

In 1977 the Georgia Society of Public Managers was created affiliated with a national organization to be known as the American Academy of Certified Public Managers. In 1980 the National CPM Consortium was developed with the completion of its constitution. The National CPM Consortium included Arizona, Florida, Georgia, Louisiana, North Carolina, and Vermont. The role of the CPM Consortium is to direct the general nature in which each program should operate, but it is not designed to dictate curriculum or administrative specifics for each program. Since then, the CPM program has expanded across the United States.

== Program linkages ==
The CPM is linked with several professional organizations, including the American Academy of Certified Public Managers, an organization for individuals with CPM accreditation and the American Society for Public Administration (ASPA), which provides free membership for CPM graduates. Annually, the Texas CPM and ASPA host a CPM/ASPA conference. In 2007 a new ASPA section called the Section on Certified Public Management was created to promote professional development and training regarding ethical values and technical competencies associated with outstanding public service. In addition, the SCPM holds conferences, forums, seminars, and discussion events.

The Texas CPM program is designed to match professional development with the educational standards of ICMA.

== International expansion ==
In 2010 CPM began the first stage of international expansion by creating a CPM credential program for the Swedish National Defense College. The program will provide training for faculty, staff, and students in Sweden and the opportunity to attain CPM designation. The contract for the CPM program at the Swedish National Defense College was signed along with the William P. Hobby Center for Public Service which is affiliated with Texas State University - San Marcos and the National CPM Consortium.

== See also ==
- Accreditation
- American Institute of Certified Public Accountants
- American Society for Public Administration
- Professional certification
