= Patrick Maloney =

Pat or Patrick Maloney may refer to:

- Sean Patrick Maloney, U.S. Representative for New York's 18th congressional district
- Patrick Maloney (politician), member of the Kansas House of Representatives
- Pat Maloney (1888–1979), baseball outfielder
- Pat Maloney Sr. (1924–2005), American trial lawyer
- Pat Maloney (footballer) (1894–1955), Australian rules footballer
