= United States House Ways and Means Subcommittee on Social Security =

Subcommittee of Committee on Ways and Means
- Active United States House of Representatives; 119th Congress

Leadership
- Chair: Ron Estes (R)
- Ranking Member: John B. Larson (D)

Structure
- Seats: 13 (13 currently filled) 8/8 5/5
- Political parties: Majority (8): Republican (8); Minority (5): Democratic (5)

Meeting place
- 1139, Longworth House Office Building; Washington, D.C. 20515

Phone number
- (202)-225-9263

The Subcommittee on Social Security is a subcommittee of the Committee on Ways and Means in the United States House of Representatives.

== Jurisdiction ==
From the House rules

- The jurisdiction of the Subcommittee on Social Security shall include bills and matters referred to the Committee on Ways and Means that relate to the Federal Old-Age, Survivors’ and Disability Insurance System, the Railroad Retirement System, and employment taxes and trust fund operations relating to those systems. More specifically, the jurisdiction of the Subcommittee on Social Security shall include bills and matters involving title II of the Social Security Act and Chapter 22 of the Internal Revenue Code (the Railroad Retirement Tax Act), as well as provisions in title VII and title XI of the Act relating to procedure and administration involving the Old-Age, Survivors’ and Disability Insurance System.

== Members, 119th Congress ==
Majority	Minority
Ron Estes, Kansas, Chair; Mike Carey, Ohio; Randy Feenstra, Iowa; Aaron Bean, Florida; Nathaniel Moran, Texas; Lloyd Smucker, Pennsylvania; Blake Moore, Utah; Rudy Yakym, Indiana	John B. Larson, Connecticut, Ranking Member; Gwen Moore, Wisconsin; Steven Horsford, Nevada; Terri Sewell, Alabama; Stacey Plaskett, U.S. Virgin Islands
Ex officio
Jason Smith, Missouri	Richard Neal, Massachusetts

== Historical membership rosters ==
=== 115th Congress ===
Majority	Minority
Sam Johnson, Texas, Chairman; Tom Rice, South Carolina; David Schweikert, Arizona; Vern Buchanan, Florida; Mike Kelly, Pennsylvania; Jim Renacci, Ohio; Jackie Walorski, Indiana	John B. Larson, Connecticut, Ranking Member; Bill Pascrell, New Jersey; Joseph Crowley, New York; Brian Higgins, New York
Ex officio
Kevin Brady, Texas	Richard Neal, Massachusetts

=== 116th Congress ===
Majority	Minority
John B. Larson, Connecticut, Chair; Bill Pascrell, New Jersey; Linda Sánchez, California; Brian Higgins, New York; Dan Kildee, Michigan; Brendan Boyle, Pennsylvania; Brad Schneider, Illinois	Tom Reed, New York, Ranking Member; Jodey Arrington, Texas; Drew Ferguson, Georgia; Ron Estes, Kansas
Ex officio
Richard Neal, Massachusetts	Kevin Brady, Texas

=== 117th Congress ===
Majority	Minority
John B. Larson, Connecticut, Chair; Bill Pascrell, New Jersey; Linda Sánchez, California; Brian Higgins, New York; Steven Horsford, Nevada; Earl Blumenauer, Oregon; Terri Sewell, Alabama; Gwen Moore, Wisconsin	Tom Reed, New York, Ranking Member; Tom Rice, South Carolina; Jodey Arrington, Texas; Ron Estes, Kansas; Kevin Hern, Oklahoma
Ex officio
Richard Neal, Massachusetts	Kevin Brady, Texas

=== 118th Congress ===
Majority	Minority
Drew Ferguson, Georgia, Chair; Mike Carey, Ohio; David Schweikert, Arizona; Ron Estes, Kansas; Blake Moore, Utah; Randy Feenstra, Iowa; Greg Steube, Florida; David Kustoff, Tennessee	John B. Larson, Connecticut, Ranking Member; Linda Sánchez, California; Brian Higgins, New York (until February 2, 2024); Dan Kildee, Michigan; Gwen Moore, Wisconsin
Ex officio
Jason Smith, Missouri	Richard Neal, Massachusetts
