= United States House Ways and Means Subcommittee on Trade =

Subcommittee of Committee on Ways and Means
- Active United States House of Representatives; 119th Congress

Leadership
- Chair: Adrian Smith (R)
- Ranking Member: Linda Sánchez (D)

Structure
- Seats: 21 (21 currently filled) 12/12 9/9
- Political parties: Majority (12): Republican (12); Minority (9): Democratic (9)

Meeting place
- 1139, Longworth House Office Building; Washington, D.C. 20515

Phone number
- (202)-225-6649

The House Way and Means Subcommittee on Trade is one of the six subcommittees within the House Ways and Means Committee

== Jurisdiction ==
From the House Rules:

- The jurisdiction of the Subcommittee on Trade shall include bills and matters referred to the Committee on Ways and Means that relate to customs and customs administration including tariff and import fee structure, classification, valuation of and special rules applying to imports, and special tariff provisions and procedures which relate to customs operation affecting exports and imports; import trade matters, including import impact, industry relief from injurious imports, adjustment assistance and programs to encourage competitive responses to imports, unfair import practices including anti-dumping and countervailing duty provisions, and import policy which relates to dependence on foreign sources of supply; commodity agreements and reciprocal trade agreements including multilateral and bilateral trade negotiations and implementation of agreements involving tariff and non-tariff trade barriers to and distortions of international trade; international rules, organizations and institutional aspects of international trade agreements; budget authorizations for the customs revenue functions of the Department of Homeland Security, the U.S. International Trade Commission, and the U.S. Trade Representative; and special trade-related problems involving market access, competitive conditions of specific industries, export policy and promotion, access to materials in short supply, bilateral trade relations including trade with developing countries, operations of multinational corporations, and trade with non-market economies.

== Members, 119th Congress ==
Majority	Minority
Adrian Smith, Nebraska, Chair; Vern Buchanan, Florida; Darin LaHood, Illinois; Jodey Arrington, Texas; Carol Miller, West Virginia; Lloyd Smucker, Pennsylvania; Greg Murphy, North Carolina; Greg Steube, Florida; Michelle Fischbach, Minnesota; Claudia Tenney, New York; Blake Moore, Utah; Beth Van Duyne, Texas	Linda Sánchez, California, Ranking Member; Jimmy Panetta, California; Suzan DelBene, Washington; Don Beyer, Virginia; Terri Sewell, Alabama; Brad Schneider, Illinois; Lloyd Doggett, Texas; John B. Larson, Connecticut; Brendan Boyle, Pennsylvania
Ex officio
Jason Smith, Missouri	Richard Neal, Massachusetts

== Historical membership rosters ==
=== 115th Congress ===
Majority	Minority
Dave Reichert, Washington, Chairman; Devin Nunes, California; Erik Paulsen, Minnesota; Mike Kelly, Pennsylvania; Pat Meehan, Pennsylvania; Tom Reed, New York; Kristi Noem, South Dakota; George Holding, North Carolina; Tom Rice, South Carolina; Mike Bishop, Michigan	Bill Pascrell, New Jersey, Ranking Member; Ron Kind, Wisconsin; Lloyd Doggett, Texas; Sander Levin, Michigan; Danny Davis, Illinois; Suzan DelBene, Washington
Ex officio
Kevin Brady, Texas	Richard Neal, Massachusetts

=== 116th Congress ===
Majority	Minority
Earl Blumenauer, Oregon, Chair; Bill Pascrell, New Jersey; Ron Kind, Wisconsin; Danny Davis, Illinois; Brian Higgins, New York; Terri Sewell, Alabama; Suzan DelBene, Washington; Don Beyer, Virginia; Dan Kildee, Michigan; Jimmy Panetta, California; Stephanie Murphy, Florida	Vern Buchanan, Florida, Ranking Member; Devin Nunes, California; George Holding, North Carolina; Tom Rice, South Carolina; Kenny Marchant, Texas; Jason T. Smith, Missouri; David Schweikert, Arizona
Ex officio
Richard Neal, Massachusetts	Kevin Brady, Texas

=== 117th Congress ===
Majority	Minority
Earl Blumenauer, Oregon, Chair; Ron Kind, Wisconsin; Danny Davis, Illinois; Brian Higgins, New York; Dan Kildee, Michigan; Jimmy Panetta, California; Stephanie Murphy, Florida; Suzan DelBene, Washington; Don Beyer, Virginia; Linda Sánchez, California; Brendan Boyle, Pennsylvania	Vern Buchanan, Florida, Ranking Member; Devin Nunes, California; Tom Rice, South Carolina; Darin LaHood, Illinois; Jodey Arrington, Texas; Drew Ferguson, Georgia; Ron Estes, Kansas; Carol Miller, West Virginia
Ex officio
Richard Neal, Massachusetts	Kevin Brady, Texas

=== 118th Congress ===
Majority	Minority
Adrian Smith, Nebraska, Chair; Vern Buchanan, Florida; Darin LaHood, Illinois; Jodey Arrington, Texas; Ron Estes, Kansas; Carol Miller, West Virginia; Lloyd Smucker, Pennsylvania; Greg Murphy, North Carolina; Greg Steube, Florida; Michelle Fischbach, Minnesota; David Kustoff, Tennessee	Earl Blumenauer, Oregon, Ranking Member; Dan Kildee, Michigan; Jimmy Panetta, California; Suzan DelBene, Washington; Don Beyer, Virginia; Linda Sánchez, California; Terri Sewell, Alabama; Brad Schneider, Illinois
Ex officio
Jason Smith, Missouri	Richard Neal, Massachusetts
