= 2022 United States House of Representatives elections in South Carolina =

- November 8, 2022

All 7 South Carolina seats to the United States House of Representatives
	Majority party	Minority party
Party	Republican	Democratic
Last election	6	1
Seats won	6	1
Seat change	Steady	Steady
Popular vote	1,056,078	517,129
Percentage	65.91%	32.27%
Swing	▲9.53%	▼10.71%

Republican hold
Democratic hold
Republican
50–60%
60–70%
70–80%
80–90%
90–100%
Democratic
40–50%
50–60%
60–70%
70–80%

The 2022 United States House of Representatives elections in South Carolina were held on November 8, 2022, to elect the seven U.S. representatives from the state of South Carolina, one from each of the state's seven congressional districts. The elections coincided with other elections to the House of Representatives, elections to the United States Senate and various state and local elections.

== Overview ==
District	Republican		Democratic		Others		Total		Result
District	Votes	%	Votes	%	Votes	%	Votes	%	Result
District 1	153,757	56.39%	115,796	42.47%	3,128	1.15%	272,681	100.0%	Republican hold
District 2	147,699	60.01%	98,081	39.85%	346	0.14%	246,126	100.0%	Republican hold
District 3	189,971	97.64%	0	0.0%	4,598	2.36%	194,569	100.0%	Republican hold
District 4	165,607	90.81%	0	0.0%	16,758	9.19%	182,365	100.0%	Republican hold
District 5	154,725	64.01%	83,299	34.46%	3,683	1.53%	241,707	100.0%	Republican hold
District 6	79,879	37.85%	130,923	62.04%	226	0.11%	211,028	100.0%	Democratic hold
District 7	164,440	64.77%	89,030	35.07%	395	0.16%	253,865	100.0%	Republican hold
Total	1,056,078	65.91%	517,129	32.27%	29,134	1.82%	1,602,341	100.0%	

Popular vote
Republican	65.91%
Democratic	32.27%
Other	1.82%

House seats
Republican	85.71%
Democratic	14.29%

== District 1 ==
2022 South Carolina's 1st congressional district election
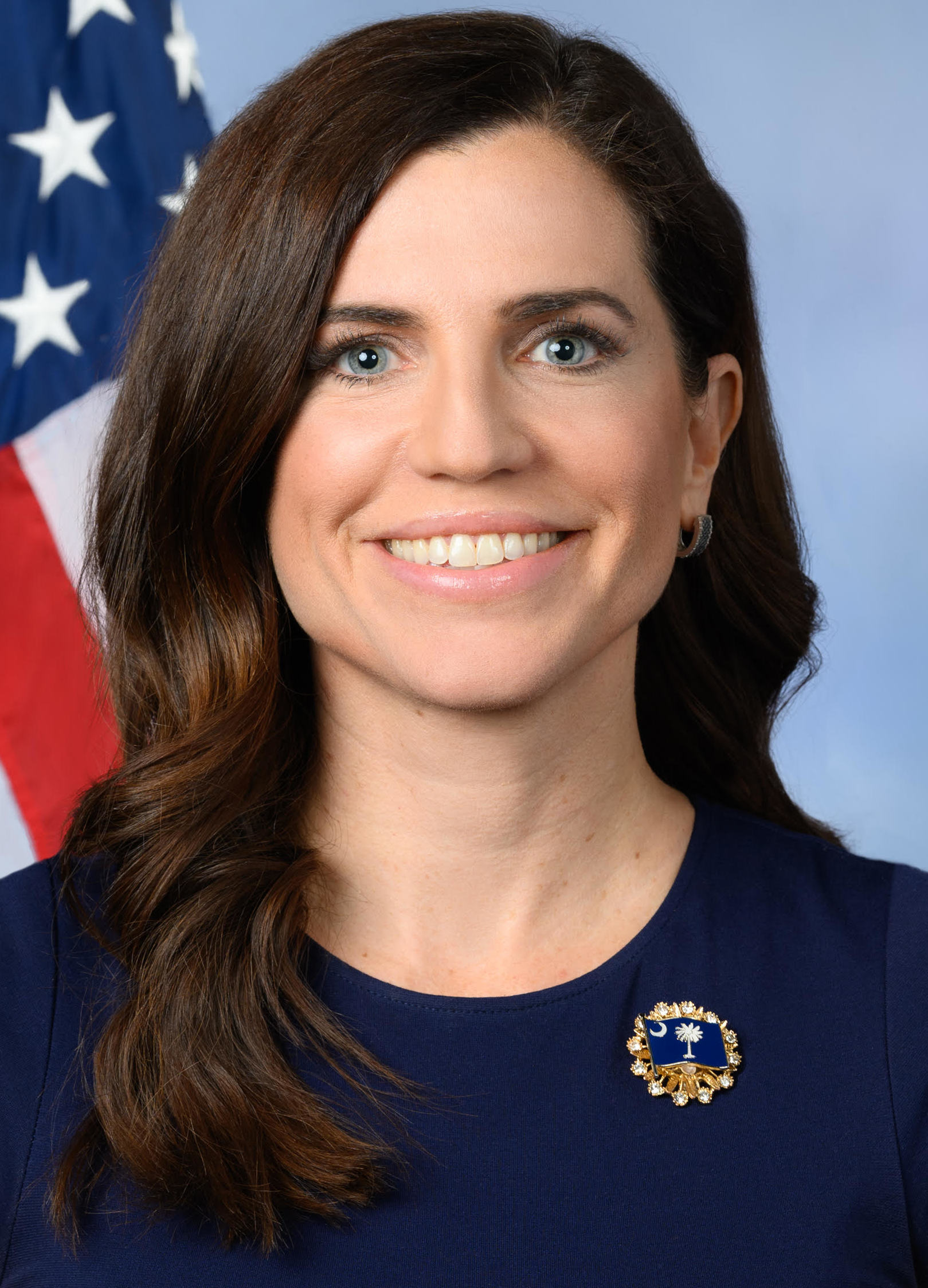

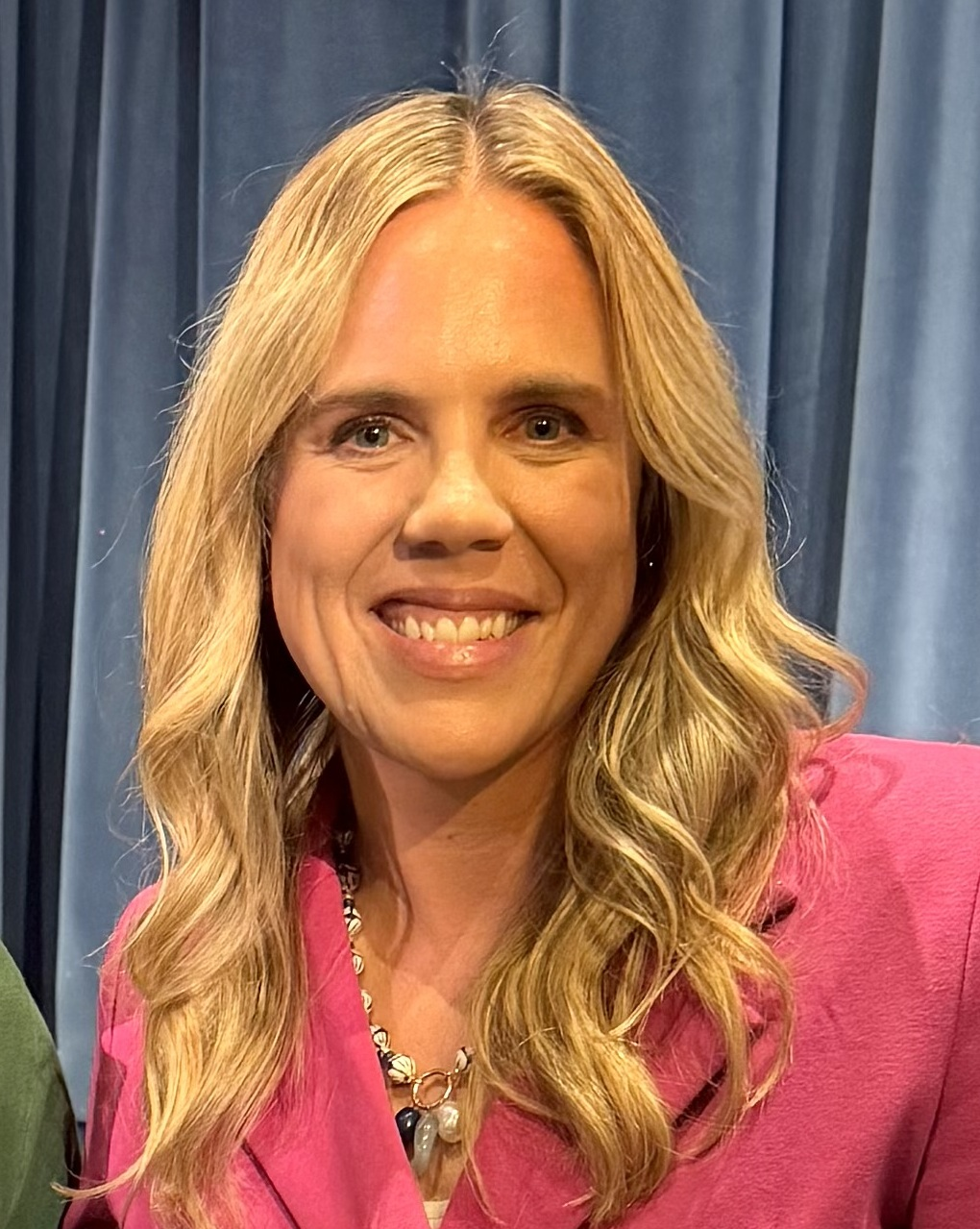
Nominee	Nancy Mace	Annie Andrews
Party	Republican	Democratic
Popular vote	153,757	115,796
Percentage	56.4%	42.5%
- Mace: 50–60% 60–70% 70–80% 80–90% >90% Andrews: 50–60% 60–70% 70–80% 80–90% >90% No votes
U.S. Representative before election
Nancy Mace
Republican
Elected U.S. Representative
Nancy Mace
Republican

The 1st district straddles the Atlantic coast of the state, and includes most of Charleston. The incumbent was Republican Nancy Mace, who flipped the district and was elected with 50.6% of the vote in 2020.

Mace defeated Democratic nominee Annie Andrews with 56.4% of the vote. In 2026, Andrews went on to win South Carolina's United States Senate election, becoming the first Democrat from the state to be elected to the US Senate since 1998.

=== Republican primary ===
==== Candidates ====
===== Nominee =====
- Nancy Mace, incumbent U.S. Representative

===== Eliminated in primary =====
- Katie Arrington, former state representative and nominee for this district in 2018

===== Withdrew =====
- T.J. Allen, U.S. Army veteran
- Keith Blandford, U.S. Navy veteran, Libertarian nominee for this district in 2012, and Republican candidate for this district in the 2013 special election (running for Secretary of State)
- Ingrid Centurion, retired lieutenant colonel and Iraq War veteran (endorsed Arrington)
- Lynz Piper-Loomis, speaker (endorsed Arrington, remained on ballot)

===== Declined =====
- Eric Bolling, conservative commentator

==== Endorsements ====
Katie Arrington

U.S. Executive Branch officials

- Peter Navarro, former Director of the Office of Trade and Manufacturing Policy (2017–2021) and former Director of the National Trade Council (2017)
- Donald Trump, 45th president of the United States (2017–2021)

U.S. Representatives

- Joe Wilson, U.S. Representative from South Carolina's 2nd congressional district (2001–present)

Individuals

- Ingrid Centurion, retired lieutenant colonel and Iraq War veteran; withdrawn candidate for this seat
- James E. Livingston, retired U.S. Marine major general and Medal of Honor recipient
- Lynz Piper-Loomis, withdrawn candidate for this seat
Nancy Mace

U.S. Executive Branch officials

- Nikki Haley, former U.S. Ambassador to the United Nations (2017–2018) and former governor of South Carolina (2011–2017)
- Mick Mulvaney, former Director of the Office of Management and Budget (2017–2020) and former U.S. Representative from South Carolina's 5th congressional district (2011–2017)

U.S. Senators

- Rand Paul, U.S. Senator from Kentucky (2011–present)

U.S. Representatives

- Tulsi Gabbard, former U.S. Representative from Hawaii's 2nd congressional district (2013–2021) and Democratic candidate for President of the United States in 2020 (Independent)
- Kevin McCarthy, U.S. Representative from California's 23rd congressional district (2005–present) and House Minority Leader (2019–present)
- Steve Scalise, U.S. Representative from Louisiana's 1st congressional district (2008–present)
- Elise Stefanik, U.S. Representative from New York's 21st congressional district (2015–present)

Local officials

- Francis Suarez, Mayor of Miami, Florida (2017–present)
- Ricky Waring, Mayor of Summerville (2020–present)

Organizations

- Citizens for Responsible Energy Solutions
- Republican Jewish Coalition PAC
- United States Chamber of Commerce

==== Debates and forums ====
2022 SC-01 Republican primary debates and forums
No.	Date	Host	Moderator	Link	Participants		
P Participant A Absent N Non-invitee I Invitee W Withdrawn							
P Participant A Absent N Non-invitee I Invitee W Withdrawn					Arrington	Mace	Piper-Loomis
1	May 23, 2022	Charleston County Republican Party	N/A	YouTube	P	P	P
	October 19, 2022	WCBD-TV News, Charleston, SC					

==== Polling ====
Poll source	Date(s) administered	Sample size (Note: Key: A – all adults RV – registered voters LV – likely voters V – unclear)	Margin of error	Katie Arrington	Nancy Mace	Lynz Piper-Loomis	Undecided
The Trafalgar Group (R)	May 26–29, 2022	556 (LV)	± 4.1%	41%	46%	–	13%
Info Strategy Northeast (R)	May 26–27, 2022	1,135 (LV)	± 3.0%	39%	44%	–	18%
Basswood Research (R) (Note: Poll sponsored by Winning for Women Action Fund, which supports Mace)	May 21–22, 2022	400 (LV)	± 4.9%	24%	44%	4%	28%
Remington Research Group (R) (Note: Poll sponsored by Arrington's campaign)	February 21–22, 2022	489 (LV)	± 4.4%	35%	50%	–	15%

==== Results ====
Results by county Mace: 30–40% Mace; 40–50% Mace; 50–60% Mace; 60–70% Mace

Results by precinct Mace: 40–50%; 50–60%; 60–70%; 70–80%; 80–90%; Arrington: 40–50%; 50–60%; 60–70%; 70–80%; 80–90%; No data

Republican primary results
Party	Candidate	Votes	%
Republican	Nancy Mace (incumbent)	39,470	53.1
Republican	Katie Arrington	33,589	45.2
Republican	Lynz Piper-Loomis (withdrawn)	1,221	1.6
Total votes		74,280	100.0

=== Democratic primary ===
==== Candidates ====
===== Nominee =====
- Annie Andrews, pediatrician

===== Withdrawn =====
- Tim Lewis, Dorchester County Democratic Party chairman

==== Endorsements ====
Annie Andrews

Organizations

- 314 Action
- Everytown for Gun Safety Action Fund
- Vote Common Good

=== Independents and other parties ===
==== Candidates ====
===== Declared =====
- Lucas Devan Faulk (Labor)
- Joseph Oddo (Alliance), chairman of the Independent Greens of Virginia and candidate for Virginia's 11th congressional district in 2008

=== General election ===
==== Debate ====
2022 South Carolina's 1st congressional district debate
No.	Date	Host	Moderator	Link	Republican	Democratic
Key: P Participant A Absent N Not invited I Invited W Withdrawn						
Key: P Participant A Absent N Not invited I Invited W Withdrawn					Nancy Mace	Annie Andrews
1	October 19, 2022	WCBD-TV	Carolyn Murray; Ben Senger	WCBD-TV	P	P

==== Predictions ====
Source	Ranking	As of
The Cook Political Report	Solid R	January 27, 2022
Inside Elections	Solid R	March 10, 2022
Sabato's Crystal Ball	Safe R	February 2, 2022
Politico	Likely R	April 5, 2022
RCP	Safe R	June 9, 2022
Fox News	Solid R	July 11, 2022
DDHQ	Solid R	July 20, 2022
538	Solid R	June 30, 2022
The Economist	Likely R	November 1, 2022

==== Results ====
2022 South Carolina's 1st congressional district election
Party	Candidate	Votes	%
Republican	Nancy Mace (incumbent)	153,757	56.39%
Democratic	Annie Andrews	115,796	42.47%
Alliance	Joseph Oddo	2,634	0.97%
Write-in		494	0.18%
Total votes		272,681	100.00%
Majority		37,961	13.92%
Republican hold			

===== By county =====
County	Nancy Mace Republican		Annie Andrews Democratic		Joseph Oddo Alliance		Write-in		Margin		Total
County	Votes	%	Votes	%	Votes	%	Votes	%	Votes	%	Total
Beaufort	42,524	59.49%	28,280	39.56%	530	0.74%	144	0.20%	14,244	19.92%	71,478
Berkeley	40,829	57.40%	29,235	41.10%	936	1.32%	134	0.19%	11,594	16.30%	71,134
Charleston	44,736	51.79%	40,876	47.32%	638	0.74%	131	0.15%	3,860	4.47%	86,381
Colleton	730	58.17%	517	41.20%	7	0.56%	1	0.08%	213	16.97%	1,255
Dorchester	23,043	58.45%	15,797	40.07%	508	1.29%	77	0.20%	7,246	18.38%	39,425
Jasper	1,895	63.00%	1,091	36.27%	15	0.50%	7	0.23%	804	26.73%	3,008

== District 2 ==
2022 South Carolina's 2nd congressional district election
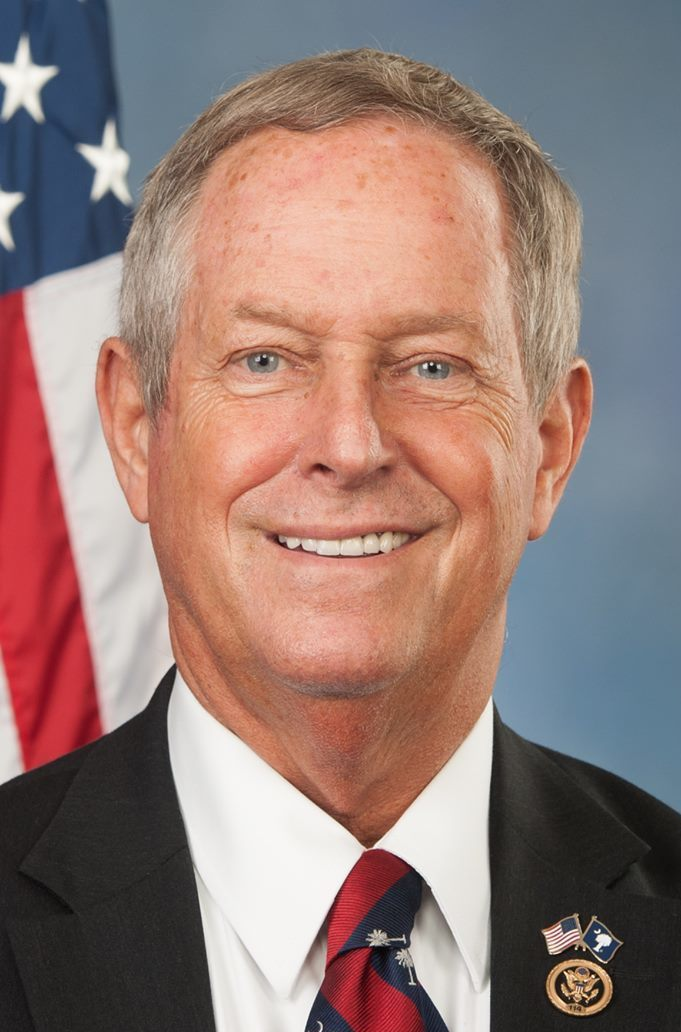

Nominee	Joe Wilson	Judd Larkins
Party	Republican	Democratic
Popular vote	147,699	98,081
Percentage	60.0%	39.9%
- Wilson: 50–60% 60–70% 70–80% 80–90% >90% Larkins: 50–60% 60–70% 70–80% 80–90% No data
U.S. Representative before election
Joe Wilson
Republican
Elected U.S. Representative
Joe Wilson
Republican

The 2nd district is located in central South Carolina and spans from Columbia to the South Carolina side of the Augusta, Georgia metropolitan area, including North Augusta. The incumbent was Republican Joe Wilson, who was re-elected with 55.7% of the vote in 2020.

=== Republican primary ===
==== Candidates ====
===== Nominee =====
- Joe Wilson, incumbent U.S. Representative

==== Endorsements ====
Joe Wilson

Federal officials

- Donald Trump, former president of the United States

=== Democratic primary ===
==== Candidates ====
===== Nominee =====
- Judd Larkins, grocery store owner

===== Withdrew =====
- Gregory Karr, progressive activist

=== General election ===
==== Debate ====
2022 South Carolina's 2nd congressional district debate
No.	Date	Host	Moderator	Link	Republican	Democratic
Key: P Participant A Absent N Not invited I Invited W Withdrawn						
Key: P Participant A Absent N Not invited I Invited W Withdrawn					Joe Wilson	Judd Larkins
1	August 24, 2022		Avery Wilks		P	P

==== Predictions ====
Source	Ranking	As of
The Cook Political Report	Solid R	January 27, 2022
Inside Elections	Solid R	March 10, 2022
Sabato's Crystal Ball	Safe R	February 2, 2022
Politico	Solid R	April 5, 2022
RCP	Safe R	June 9, 2022
Fox News	Solid R	July 11, 2022
DDHQ	Solid R	July 20, 2022
538	Solid R	June 30, 2022
The Economist	Safe R	September 28, 2022

==== Results ====
2022 South Carolina's 2nd congressional district election
Party	Candidate	Votes	%
Republican	Joe Wilson (incumbent)	147,699	60.01%
Democratic	Judd Larkins	98,081	39.85%
Write-in		346	0.14%
Total votes		246,126	100.00%
Majority		49,618	20.16%
Republican hold			

===== By county =====
County	Joe Wilson Republican		Judd Larkins Democratic		Write-in		Margin		Total
County	Votes	%	Votes	%	Votes	%	Votes	%	Total
Aiken	37,075	67.68%	17,646	32.21%	59	0.11%	19,429	35.47%	54,780
Barnwell	3,795	60.54%	2,468	39.37%	6	0.10%	1,327	21.17%	6,269
Lexington	68,151	68.95%	30,509	30.87%	182	0.18%	37,642	38.08%	98,842
Orangeburg	3,779	50.06%	3,714	49.53%	5	0.07%	65	0.87%	7,498
Richland	34,899	44.32%	43,744	55.56%	94	0.12%	-8,845	-11.23%	78,737

== District 3 ==
2022 South Carolina's 3rd congressional district election
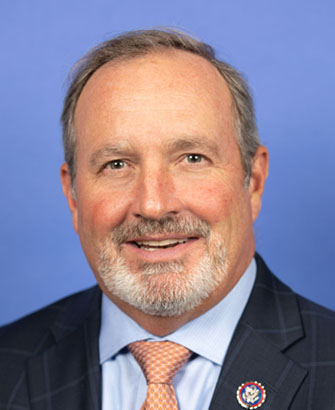
Nominee	Jeff Duncan
Party	Republican
Popular vote	189,971
Percentage	97.6%
- County results Duncan: ≥90%
U.S. Representative before election
Jeff Duncan
Republican
Elected U.S. Representative
Jeff Duncan
Republican

The 3rd district takes in the Piedmont area in northwestern South Carolina, including Anderson and Greenwood. The incumbent was Republican Jeff Duncan, who was re-elected with 71.2% of the vote in 2020. Duncan was not opposed in the general election, as the state Democrats did not put up a candidate.

=== Republican primary ===
==== Candidates ====
===== Nominee =====
- Jeff Duncan, incumbent U.S. Representative

==== Endorsements ====
Jeff Duncan

Federal officials

- Donald Trump, former president of the United States

=== General election ===
==== Predictions ====
Source	Ranking	As of
The Cook Political Report	Solid R	January 27, 2022
Inside Elections	Solid R	March 10, 2022
Sabato's Crystal Ball	Safe R	February 2, 2022
Politico	Solid R	April 5, 2022
RCP	Safe R	June 9, 2022
Fox News	Solid R	July 11, 2022
DDHQ	Solid R	July 20, 2022
538	Solid R	June 30, 2022
The Economist	Safe R	September 28, 2022

==== Results ====
2022 South Carolina's 3rd congressional district election
Party	Candidate	Votes	%
Republican	Jeff Duncan (incumbent)	189,971	97.64%
Write-in		4,598	2.36%
Total votes		194,569	100.00%
Majority		185,373	95.27%
Republican hold			

===== By county =====
County	Jeff Duncan Republican		Write-in		Margin		Total
County	Votes	%	Votes	%	Votes	%	Total
Abbeville	6,685	99.02%	66	0.98%	6,619	98.04%	6,751
Anderson	51,996	97.52%	1,320	2.48%	50,676	95.05%	53,316
Edgefield	6,613	98.83%	78	1.17%	6,535	97.67%	6,691
Greenville	17,090	97.32%	470	2.68%	16,620	94.65%	17,560
Greenwood	16,229	97.68%	386	2.32%	15,843	95.35%	16,615
Laurens	15,578	98.71%	348	2.19%	15,230	95.63%	15,926
McCormick	3,062	98.68%	41	1.32%	3,021	97.36%	3,103
Newberry	9,803	98.72%	127	1.28%	9,676	97.44%	9,930
Oconee	24,038	97.25%	679	2.75%	23,359	94.51%	24,717
Pickens	33,561	97.00%	1,039	3.00%	32,522	93.99%	34,600
Saluda	5,316	99.18%	44	0.82%	5,272	98.36%	5,360

== District 4 ==
2022 South Carolina's 4th congressional district election
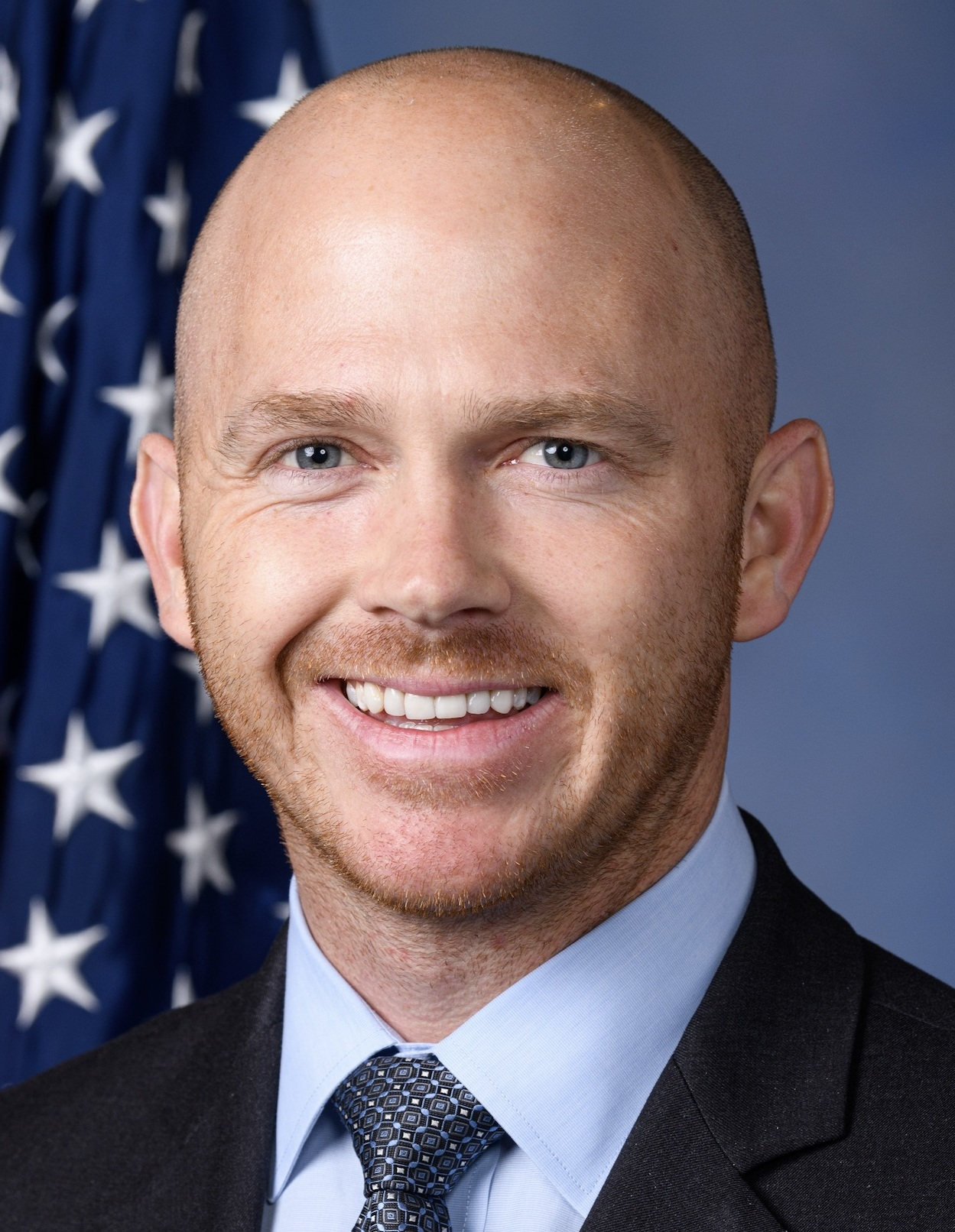
Nominee	William Timmons
Party	Republican
Popular vote	165,607
Percentage	90.8%
- County results Timmons: 80–90% ≥90%
U.S. Representative before election
William Timmons
Republican
Elected U.S. Representative
William Timmons
Republican

The 4th district is located in Upstate South Carolina, taking in Greenville and Spartanburg. The incumbent was Republican William Timmons, who was re-elected with 61.6% of the vote in 2020. Democratic nominee Ken Hill withdrew his candidacy in August. Lee Turner organized a write-in campaign for the seat, after court ruling that State Democrats could not place another candidate on the ballot.

=== Republican primary ===
==== Candidates ====
===== Nominee =====
- William Timmons, incumbent U.S. Representative

===== Eliminated in primary =====
- George Abuzeid, commercial pilot
- Mark Burns, televangelist and candidate for this district in 2018
- Michael LaPierre, entrepreneur

==== Polling ====
Poll source	Date(s) administered	Sample size	Margin of error	George Abuzeid	Mark Burns	Michael LaPierre	William Timmons	Undecided
The Trafalgar Group (R)	February 21–24, 2022	785 (LV)	± 3.5%	6%	10%	7%	46%	32%

==== Results ====
Results by county Timmons: 50–60%

Results by precinct Timmons: 30–40%; 40–50%; 50–60%; 60–70%; 70–80%; 80–90%; Burns: 40–50%; No data

Republican primary results
Party	Candidate	Votes	%
Republican	William Timmons (incumbent)	24,800	52.7
Republican	Mark Burns	11,214	23.8
Republican	Michael LaPierre	8,029	17.1
Republican	George Abuzeid	3,024	6.4
Total votes		47,067	100.0

=== Democratic primary ===
==== Candidates ====
===== Nominee (withdrew) =====
- Ken Hill, business consultant

=== Independents and other parties ===
==== Candidates ====
===== Declared =====
- Michael Chandler (Constitution), perennial candidate

=== General election ===
==== Predictions ====
Source	Ranking	As of
The Cook Political Report	Solid R	January 27, 2022
Inside Elections	Solid R	March 10, 2022
Sabato's Crystal Ball	Safe R	February 2, 2022
Politico	Solid R	April 5, 2022
RCP	Safe R	June 9, 2022
Fox News	Solid R	July 11, 2022
DDHQ	Solid R	July 20, 2022
538	Solid R	June 30, 2022
The Economist	Safe R	September 28, 2022

==== Results ====
2022 South Carolina's 4th congressional district election
Party	Candidate	Votes	%
Republican	William Timmons (incumbent)	165,607	90.81%
Write-in		16,758	9.19%
Total votes		182,365	100.00%
Majority		148,849	81.62%
Republican hold			

===== By county =====
County	William Timmons Republican		Write-in		Margin		Total
County	Votes	%	Votes	%	Votes	%	Total
Greenville	107,762	88.76%	13,646	11.24%	94,116	77.52%	121,408
Spartanburg	57,845	94.89%	3,112	5.11%	54,733	89.79%	60,957

== District 5 ==
2022 South Carolina's 5th congressional district election
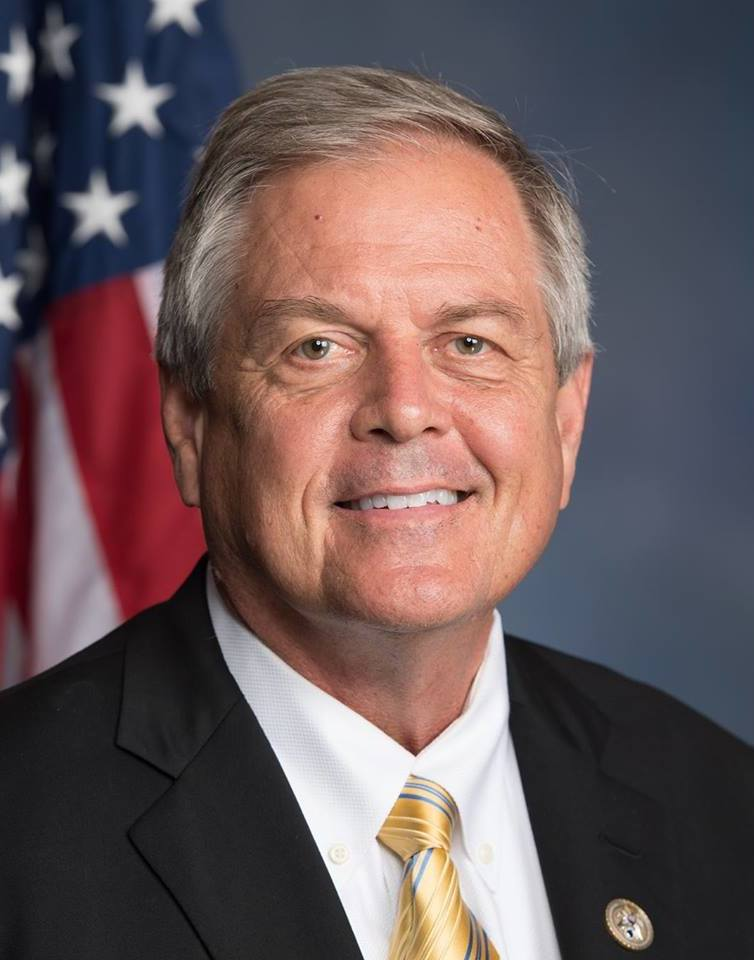

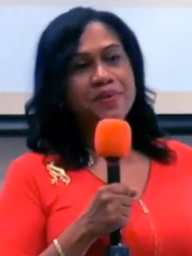
Nominee	Ralph Norman	Evangeline Hundley
Party	Republican	Democratic
Popular vote	154,725	83,299
Percentage	64.0%	34.5%
- Norman: 40–50% 50–60% 60–70% 70–80% 80–90% >90% Hundley: 40–50% 50–60% 60–70% 70–80% 80–90% >90% Tie: 50%
U.S. Representative before election
Ralph Norman
Republican
Elected U.S. Representative
Ralph Norman
Republican

The 5th district is located in northern South Carolina and encompasses the southern suburbs and exurbs of Charlotte, including Rock Hill. The incumbent was Republican Ralph Norman, who was re-elected with 60.1% of the vote in 2020.

=== Republican primary ===
==== Candidates ====
===== Nominee =====
- Ralph Norman, incumbent U.S. Representative

=== Democratic primary ===
==== Candidates ====
===== Nominee =====
- Evangeline Hundley, realtor

===== Eliminated in primary =====
- Kevin Eckert, Wildlife Services biological science technician

==== Results ====
Democratic primary results
Party	Candidate	Votes	%
Democratic	Evangeline Hundley	11,257	57.6
Democratic	Kevin Eckert	8,274	42.4
Total votes		19,531	100.0

=== Independents and other parties ===
==== Candidates ====
===== Declared =====
- Larry Gaither (Green), American candidate for this seat in 2016

=== General election ===
==== Predictions ====
Source	Ranking	As of
The Cook Political Report	Solid R	January 27, 2022
Inside Elections	Solid R	March 10, 2022
Sabato's Crystal Ball	Safe R	February 2, 2022
Politico	Solid R	April 5, 2022
RCP	Safe R	June 9, 2022
Fox News	Solid R	July 11, 2022
DDHQ	Solid R	July 20, 2022
538	Solid R	June 30, 2022
The Economist	Safe R	September 28, 2022

==== Results ====
2022 South Carolina's 5th congressional district election
Party	Candidate	Votes	%
Republican	Ralph Norman (incumbent)	154,725	64.01%
Democratic	Evangeline Hundley	83,299	34.46%
Green	Larry Gaither	3,547	1.47%
Write-in		136	0.06%
Total votes		241,707	100.00%
Majority		71,426	29.55%
Republican hold			

===== By county =====
County	Ralph Norman Republican		Evangeline Hundley Democratic		Larry Gaither Green		Write-in		Margin		Total
County	Votes	%	Votes	%	Votes	%	Votes	%	Votes	%	Total
Cherokee	12,633	78.32%	3,337	20.69%	157	0.97%	3	0.02%	9,296	57.63%	16,130
Chester	5,930	61.78%	3,508	36.55%	157	1.64%	4	0.04%	2,422	25.23%	9,599
Fairfield	3,795	45.42%	4,167	49.87%	383	4.58%	11	0.13%	-372	-4.45%	8,356
Kershaw	14,728	66.08%	7,193	32.27%	357	1.60%	11	0.05%	7,535	33.81%	22,289
Lancaster	22,937	66.35%	11,172	32.32%	452	1.31%	11	0.03%	11,765	34.03%	34,572
Lee	2,170	41.41%	3,014	57.52%	53	1.01%	3	0.06%	-844	-16.11%	5,240
Spartanburg	14,534	79.08%	3,633	19.77%	200	1.09%	13	0.07%	10,901	59.31%	18,380
Sumter	11,856	52.38%	10,474	46.27%	294	1.30%	12	0.05%	1,382	6.11%	22,636
Union	5,902	68.45%	2,617	30.35%	91	1.06%	12	0.14%	3,285	38.10%	8,622
York	60,240	62.83%	34,184	35.65%	1,403	1.46%	56	0.06%	26,056	27.17%	95,883

== District 6 ==
2022 South Carolina's 6th congressional district election
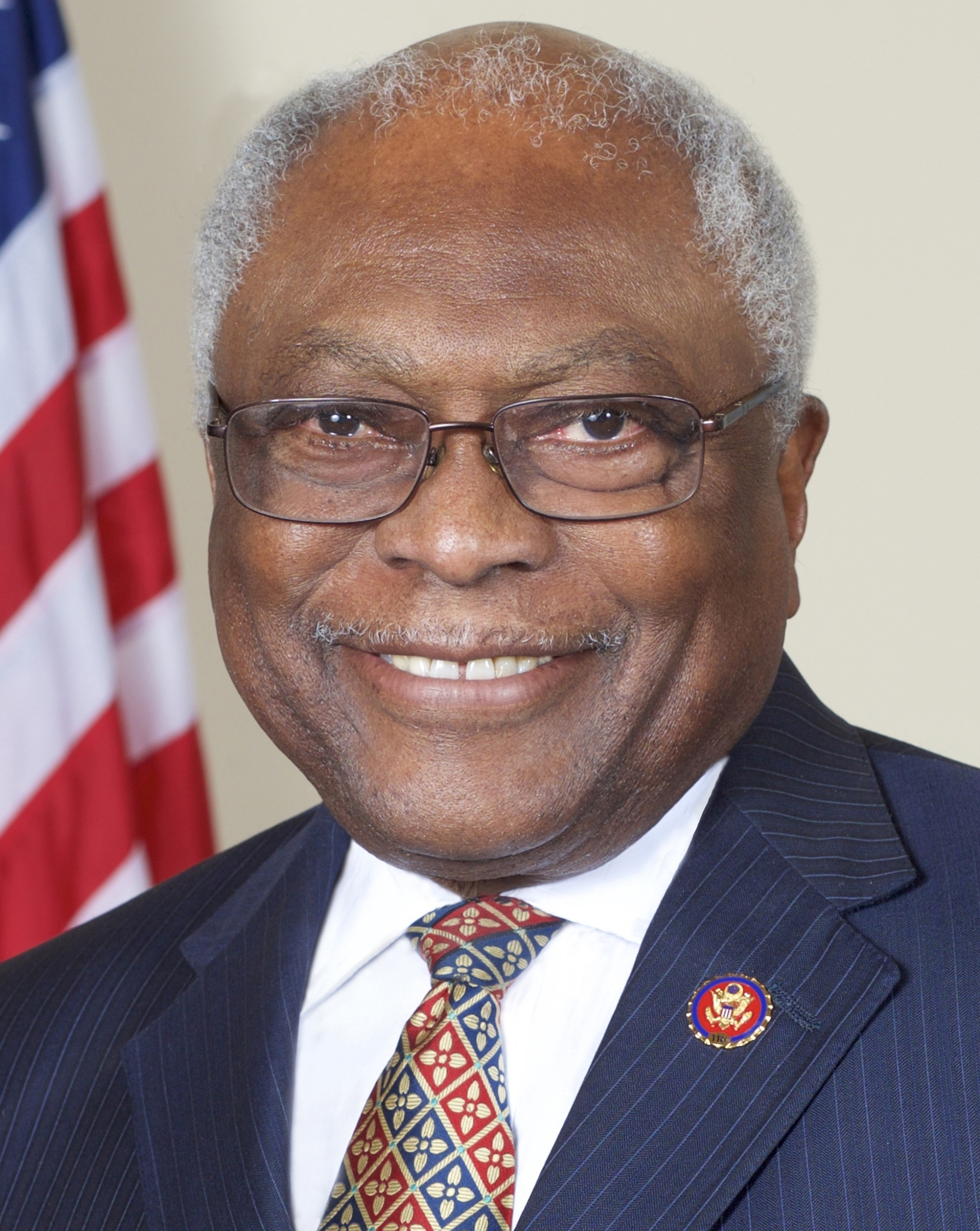

Nominee	Jim Clyburn	Duke Buckner
Party	Democratic	Republican
Popular vote	130,923	79,879
Percentage	62.0%	37.9%
- Clyburn: 50–60% 60–70% 70–80% 80–90% >90% Buckner: 50–60% 60–70% 70–80% 80–90% >90% Tie: 50% No votes
U.S. Representative before election
Jim Clyburn
Democratic
Elected U.S. Representative
Jim Clyburn
Democratic

The 6th district runs through the Black Belt and takes in Columbia and North Charleston. The incumbent was Democrat Jim Clyburn, who was re-elected with 68.2% of the vote in 2020.

=== Democratic primary ===
==== Candidates ====
===== Nominee =====
- Jim Clyburn, incumbent U.S. Representative and House Majority Whip

===== Eliminated in primary =====
- Michael Addison, candidate for state representative in 2020
- Gregg Marcel Dixon, Gullah educator, reparations activist

==== Endorsements ====
Jim Clyburn

Organizations

- Feminist Majority PAC

==== Results ====
2022 Democratic primary results by precinct: Clyburn: 30–40%; 40–50%; 50–60%; 60–70%; 70–80%; 80–90%; 90–100%; Tie No data

Democratic primary results
Party	Candidate	Votes	%
Democratic	Jim Clyburn (incumbent)	48,729	87.9
Democratic	Michael Addison	4,203	7.6
Democratic	Gregg Marcel Dixon	2,503	4.5
Total votes		55,435	100.0

=== Republican primary ===
==== Candidates ====
===== Nominee =====
- Duke Buckner, attorney and former Walterboro city councilor

===== Eliminated in primary =====
- Sonia Morris, business professor

==== Results ====
Republican primary results
Party	Candidate	Votes	%
Republican	Duke Buckner	15,638	74.4
Republican	A. Sonia Morris	5,374	25.6
Total votes		21,012	100.0

=== General election ===
==== Predictions ====
Source	Ranking	As of
The Cook Political Report	Solid D	January 27, 2022
Inside Elections	Solid D	March 10, 2022
Sabato's Crystal Ball	Safe D	February 2, 2022
Politico	Solid D	April 5, 2022
RCP	Safe D	June 9, 2022
Fox News	Solid D	July 11, 2022
DDHQ	Solid D	July 20, 2022
538	Solid D	June 30, 2022
The Economist	Safe D	September 28, 2022

==== Results ====
2022 South Carolina's 6th congressional district election
Party	Candidate	Votes	%
Democratic	Jim Clyburn (incumbent)	130,923	62.04%
Republican	Duke Buckner	79,879	37.85%
Write-in		226	0.11%
Total votes		211,028	100.00%
Majority		51,044	24.19%
Democratic hold			

===== By county =====
County	Jim Clyburn Democratic		Duke Buckner Republican		Write-in		Margin		Total
County	Votes	%	Votes	%	Votes	%	Votes	%	Total
Allendale	1,288	70.65%	533	29.24%	2	0.11%	755	41.42%	1,823
Bamberg	2,222	55.87%	1,752	44.05%	3	0.08%	470	11.82%	3,977
Calhoun	2,290	40.65%	3,335	59.20%	8	0.14%	-1,045	-18.55%	5,633
Charleston	40,291	61.00%	25,697	38.90%	64	0.10%	14,594	22.09%	66,052
Clarendon	4,991	43.63%	6,444	56.33%	4	0.03%	-1,453	-12.70%	11,439
Colleton	4,467	39.54%	6,820	60.36%	11	0.10%	-2,353	-20.83%	11,298
Dorchester	4,778	47.55%	5,262	52.37%	8	0.08%	-484	-4.82%	10,048
Florence	1,775	60.25%	1,163	39.48%	8	0.27%	612	20.77%	2,946
Hampton	3,047	54.21%	2,572	45.76%	2	0.04%	475	8.45%	5,621
Jasper	3,657	45.25%	4,414	54.62%	10	0.12%	-757	-9.37%	8,081
Orangeburg	12,752	68.38%	5,878	31.52%	20	0.11%	6,874	36.86%	18,650
Richland	38,441	80.57%	9,207	19.30%	66	0.14%	29,234	61.27%	47,714
Sumter	5,029	63.06%	2,938	36.84%	8	0.10%	2,091	26.22%	7,975
Williamsburg	5,895	60.33%	3,864	39.55%	12	0.12%	2,031	20.79%	9,771

== District 7 ==
2022 South Carolina's 7th congressional district election
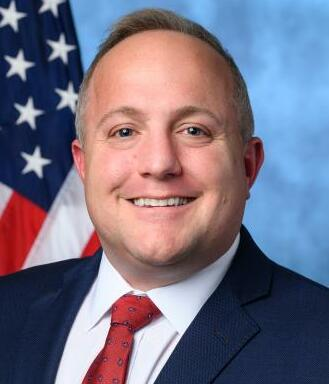

Nominee	Russell Fry	Daryl W. Scott
Party	Republican	Democratic
Popular vote	164,440	89,030
Percentage	64.8%	35.1%
- Fry: 50–60% 60–70% 70–80% 80–90% >90% Scott: 50–60% 60–70% 70–80% 80–90% >90%
U.S. Representative before election
Tom Rice
Republican
Elected U.S. Representative
Russell Fry
Republican

The 7th district is located in northeastern South Carolina, taking in Myrtle Beach and Florence. The incumbent was Republican Tom Rice, who had been re-elected with 61.8% of the vote in 2020. During the district's Republican primary, Rice was defeated by state representative Russell Fry, who went on to win the general election with 64.8% of the vote. Rice was one of ten House Republicans who voted in favor of a second impeachment of Donald Trump, for which he was later censured by the South Carolina Republican Party.

=== Republican primary ===
==== Candidates ====
===== Nominee =====
- Russell Fry, state representative

===== Eliminated in primary =====
- Barbara Arthur, businesswoman and activist
- Garrett Barton, physician
- Mark Struthers McBride, former mayor of Myrtle Beach
- Spencer Morris, pharmacist
- Tom Rice, incumbent U.S. Representative
- Ken Richardson, chairman of the Horry County School Board

===== Withdrew =====
- Graham Allen, U.S. Army veteran and political commentator
- Jeanette Spurlock

==== Endorsements ====
Graham Allen (withdrawn)

U.S. Representatives

- Marjorie Taylor Greene, U.S Representative from Georgia's 14th congressional district (2021–present)

Individuals

- Candace Owens, conservative commentator and activist
- Charlie Kirk, conservative activist and radio host

Organizations

- Turning Point Action
Russell Fry

U.S. Executive Branch officials

- Donald Trump, 45th president of the United States (2017–2021)

State legislators

- Lin Bennett, state representative from the 114th district (2016–present)
- Jason Elliott, state representative from the 22nd district (2016–present)
- Gil Gatch, state representative from the 94th district (2020–present)
- Chip Huggins, state representative from the 85th district (1999–present)
- Stewart Jones, state representative from the 14th district (2019–present)
- Phillip Lowe, state representative from the 60th district (2007–present)
- Jay Lucas, Speaker of the South Carolina House of Representatives (2014–present) from the 65th district (1998–present)
- Bill Taylor, state representative from the 86th district (2010–present)

Individuals

- Mike Lindell, businessman, MyPillow founder, and conservative political activist
Tom Rice

U.S. Representatives

- Liz Cheney, U.S. Representative from Wyoming's at-large congressional district (2017–2023)
- Paul Ryan, former Speaker of the United States House of Representatives (2015–2019)

Governors

- Chris Christie, former governor of New Jersey (2010–2018) and candidate for President of the United States in 2016

Organizations

- United States Chamber of Commerce

==== Polling ====
Poll source	Date(s) administered	Sample size	Margin of error	Barbara Arthur	Garrett Barton	Russell Fry	Mark McBride	Spencer Morris	Tom Rice	Ken Richardson	Undecided
The Trafalgar Group (R)	May 26–29, 2022	572 (LV)	± 4.0%	10%	3%	42%	2%	2%	25%	10%	7%
Ivory Tusk Consulting (R) (Note: Poll sponsored by Fry's campaign)	May 7–10, 2022	500 (LV)	± 4.0%	–	–	39%	–	–	23%	20%	18%
Ivory Tusk Consulting (R)	March 13–15, 2022	615 (LV)	± 3.4%	5%	3%	39%	6%	–	18%	5%	24%
Ivory Tusk Consulting (R)	February 2022	– (LV)	–	6%	3%	17%	6%	–	19%	6%	43%
Ivory Tusk Consulting (R)	January 2022	– (LV)	–	5%	3%	10%	6%	–	18%	6%	52%

Runoff polling

Poll source	Date(s) administered	Sample size	Margin of error	Russell Fry	Tom Rice	Undecided
Ivory Tusk Consulting (R)	May 7–10, 2022	500 (LV)	± 4.0%	55%	25%	21%

==== Results ====
2022 GOP primary results by precinct: Fry: 20–30%; 30–40%; 40–50%; 50–60%; 60–70%; 70–80%; 80–90%; Rice: 30–40%; 40–50%; 50–60%; 90–100%; Arthur: 30–40%; 40–50%; 50–60%; 60–70%; Barton: 20–30%; 30–40%; Richardson: 30–40%

Republican primary results
Party	Candidate	Votes	%
Republican	Russell Fry	43,509	51.1
Republican	Tom Rice (incumbent)	20,927	24.6
Republican	Barbara Arthur	10,481	12.3
Republican	Ken Richardson	6,021	7.1
Republican	Garrett Barton	2,154	2.5
Republican	Mark Struthers McBride	1,676	2.0
Republican	Spencer Morris	444	0.5
Total votes		85,212	100.0

=== Democratic primary ===
==== Candidates ====
===== Nominee =====
- Daryl W. Scott, National Guard officer

=== General election ===
==== Predictions ====
Source	Ranking	As of
The Cook Political Report	Solid R	January 27, 2022
Inside Elections	Solid R	March 10, 2022
Sabato's Crystal Ball	Safe R	February 2, 2022
Politico	Solid R	April 5, 2022
RCP	Safe R	June 9, 2022
Fox News	Solid R	July 11, 2022
DDHQ	Solid R	July 20, 2022
538	Solid R	June 30, 2022
The Economist	Safe R	September 28, 2022

==== Results ====
2022 South Carolina's 7th congressional district election
Party	Candidate	Votes	%
Republican	Russell Fry	164,440	64.77%
Democratic	Daryl W. Scott	89,030	35.07%
Write-in		395	0.16%
Total votes		253,865	100.00%
Majority		75,410	29.70%
Republican hold			

===== By county =====
County	Russell Fry Republican		Daryl W. Scott Democratic		Write-in		Margin		Total
County	Votes	%	Votes	%	Votes	%	Votes	%	Total
Chesterfield	8,115	64.74%	4,402	35.12%	18	0.14%	3,713	29.62%	12,535
Darlington	11,804	59.02%	8,177	40.89%	19	0.10%	3,627	18.14%	20,000
Dillon	4,283	54.78%	3,531	45.16%	5	0.06%	752	9.62%	7,819
Florence	22,089	57.64%	16,175	42.21%	58	0.15%	5,914	15.43%	38,322
Georgetown	16,753	61.42%	10,485	38.44%	38	0.14%	6,268	22.98%	27,276
Horry	94,322	70.90%	38,481	28.92%	239	0.18%	55,841	41.97%	133,042
Marion	3,875	46.16%	4,509	53.72%	10	0.12%	-634	-7.55%	8,394
Marlboro	3,199	49.39%	3,270	50.49%	8	0.12%	-71	-1.10%	6,477

== Notes ==
Partisan clients
