= Russell Fry =

American politician (born 1985)

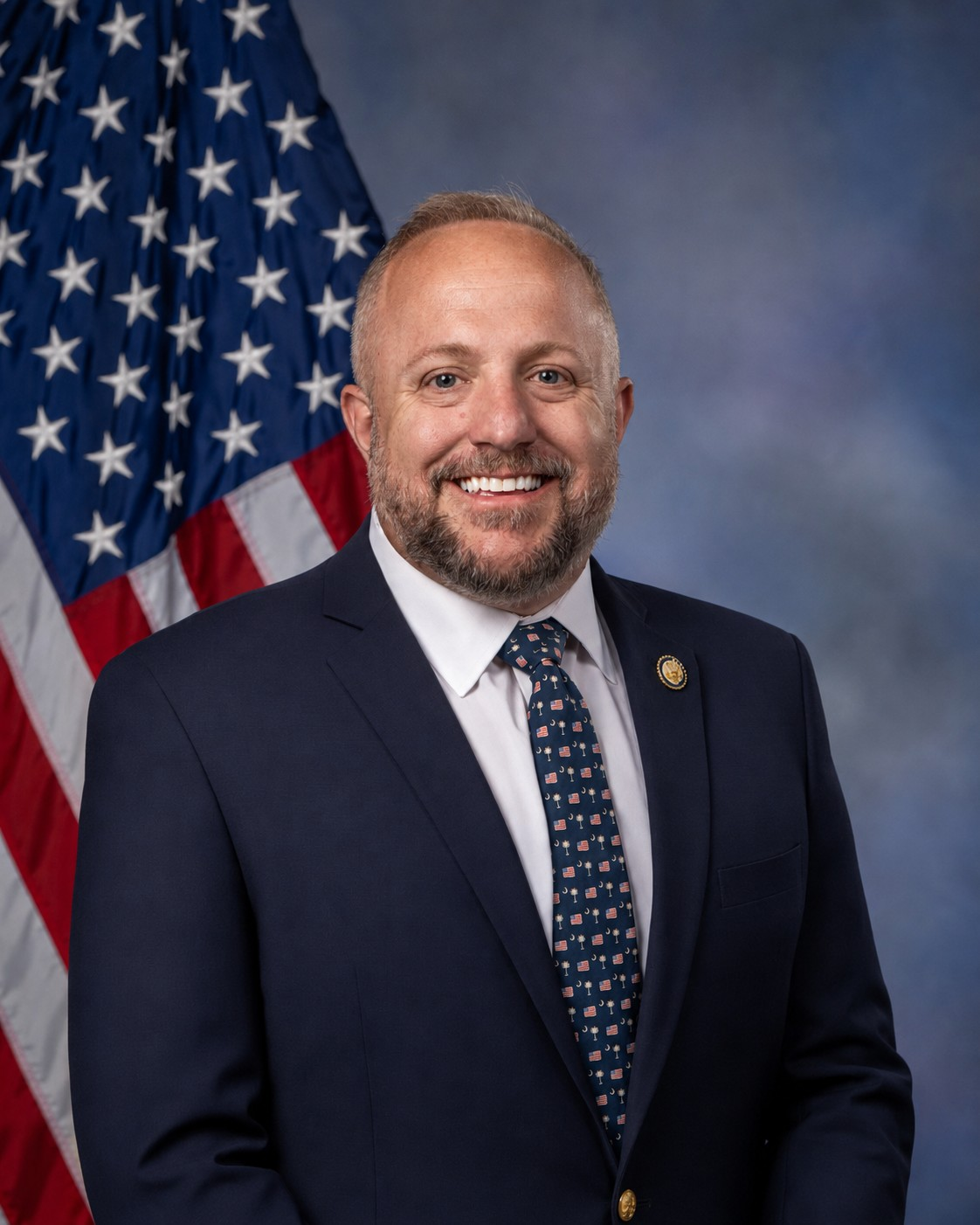
- Official portrait, 2025

Member of the U.S. House of Representatives from South Carolina's 7th district
- Incumbent
- Assumed office January 3, 2023
- Preceded by: Tom Rice

Member of the South Carolina House of Representatives from the 106th district
- In office September 15, 2015 – November 14, 2022
- Preceded by: Nelson Hardwick
- Succeeded by: Thomas Val Guest

Personal details
- Born: Russell William Fry; January 31, 1985 (age 41) Surfside Beach, South Carolina, U.S.
- Party: Republican
- Spouse: Bronwen Fry (m. 2014)
- Children: 1
- Education: University of South Carolina (BA); Charleston School of Law (JD)
- Website: House website Campaign website

Russell William Fry (born January 31, 1985) is an American politician and lawyer serving as the U.S. representative for South Carolina's 7th congressional district since 2023. Previously, he represented the 106th District in the South Carolina House of Representatives from 2015 to 2022. He is a member of the Republican Party.

Fry was first elected to Congress in 2022 after defeating incumbent Tom Rice in the Republican primary. He was a candidate in the U.S. Senate special primary to replace Lindsey Graham, following his death. He placed third in the primary.

== Early life and education ==
Fry was born on January 31, 1985 in Surfside Beach, South Carolina to Matthew and Sunny Fry. He has said that growing up, his family lived paycheck to paycheck in a cinderblock home. He has said that this taught him the value of hard work. He was an active member of the Boy scouts of America and he had earned the rank of Eagle Scout in the year of 2003.

Fry graduated from Socastee High School in Myrtle Beach, South Carolina. Afterwards, he self-funded his attendance at the University of South Carolina. He graduated in 2007 with a Bachelor of Arts in political science and a minor in business administration. In 2011, he received his JD from Charleston School of Law, and works as an attorney at Coastal Law LLC.

== South Carolina House of Representatives (2015–2022) ==
In May 2015, State Representative Nelson Hardwick announced his resignation after House leadership investigated sexual harassment allegations against him. Fry ran in the special election for Hardwick's seat. He won a plurality of the vote in the Republican primary in July and advanced to a runoff against Tyler Servant. Fry won the runoff, and was unopposed in the general election. From 2019 through 2022, he served as the Chief Majority Whip for the 123rd and 124th South Carolina General Assemblies. During this time, he also served on the House Opioid Abuse Prevention Study Committee, a committee he chaired in 2020.

== U.S. House of Representatives (2023–present) ==
=== Elections ===
==== 2022 ====
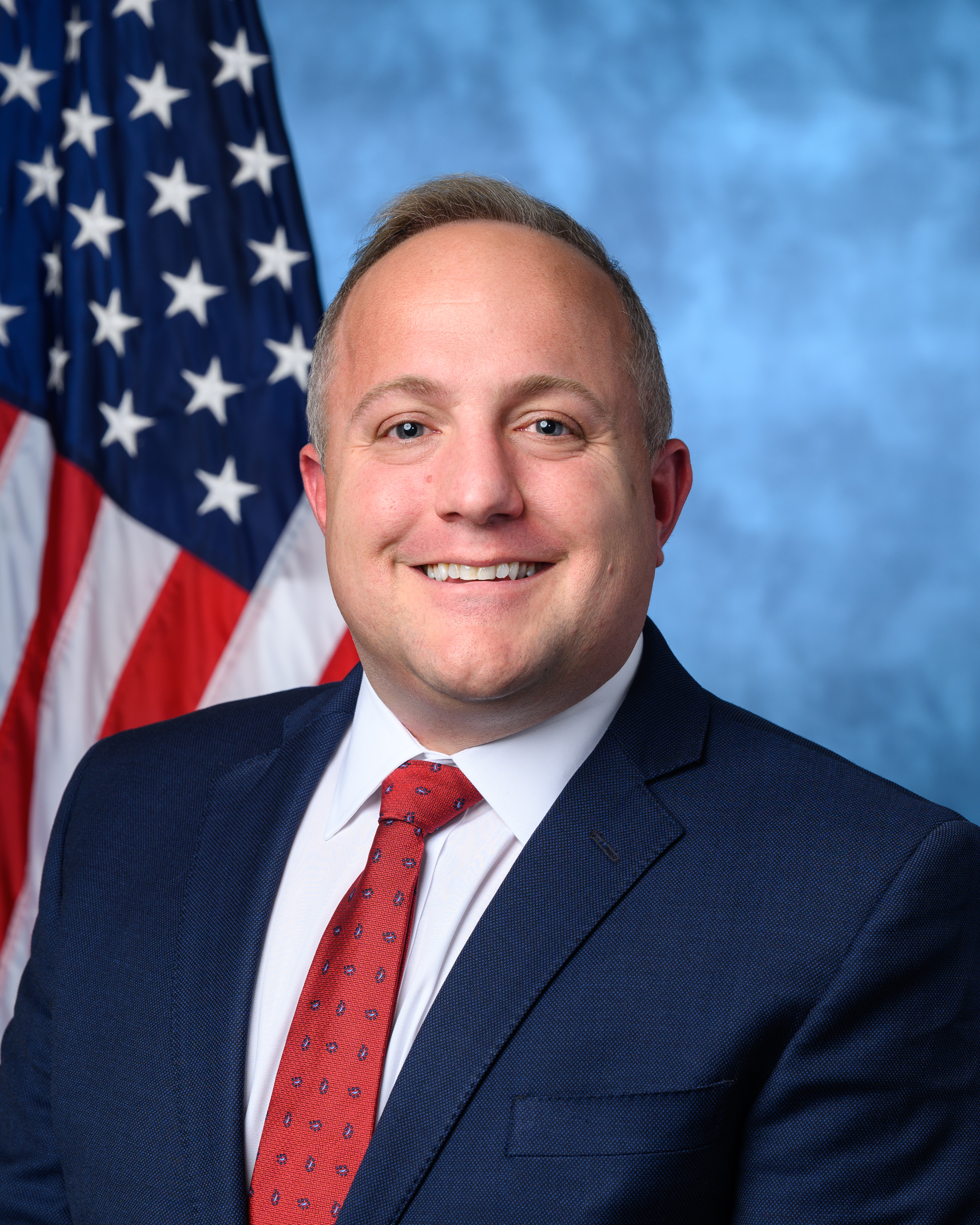
Official portrait, 2023

In the aftermath of the 2021 United States Capitol attack, Tom Rice, who was serving as the U.S. representative for South Carolina's 7th congressional district, unexpectedly voted in favor of impeaching President Donald Trump. Fry criticized Rice for his vote, and said he was considering running against him in 2022. In August 2021, Fry announced that he would challenge Rice in the 2022 election, emphasizing his opposition to Trump's impeachment. On February 1, 2022, Trump endorsed Fry. In the June 14 Republican primary, Fry defeated Rice by 26.6 percentage points. On November 8, Fry was elected to Congress with 64.8% of the vote, defeating Democratic nominee Daryl Scott.

==== 2026 ====
2022 Republican primary results by precinct Fry: 20–30%; 30–40%; 40–50%; 50–60%; 60–70%; 70–80%; 80–90%; Rice: 30–40%; 40–50%; 50–60%; 90–100%; Arthur: 30–40%; 40–50%; 50–60%; 60–70%; Barton: 20–30%; 30–40%; Richardson: 30–40%

=== Tenure ===
Fry was elected to serve as the president of the congressional freshman class during orientation week. On January 16, 2023, it was announced that Fry would serve on the House Judiciary Committee.

==== Caucus memberships ====
- Congressional Western Caucus

== Political positions ==
=== Syria ===
In 2023, Fry was among 47 Republicans to vote in favor of H.Con.Res. 21, which directed President Joe Biden to remove U.S. troops from Syria within 180 days.

=== Somalia ===
In 2023, Fry was among 52 Republicans who voted in favor H.Con.Res. 30, which would remove American troops from Somalia.

=== Antisemitism ===
Fry was among the 187 Republicans who voted in favor of H.R. 6090: The Antisemitism Awareness Act. The act would require the use of the International Holocaust Remembrance Alliance definition of antisemitism "when reviewing or investigating complaints of discrimination based on race, color, or national origin in programs or activities that receive federal financial assistance." The American Civil Liberties Union, along with other organizations, warned against the adoption of this definition as it could limit free speech surrounding criticism of Israel on college campuses.

=== Israel ===
Fry voted to provide Israel with support following the 2023 Hamas attack on Israel.

== Electoral history ==
2015 South Carolina House of Representatives District 106 special Republican primary
Party	Candidate	Votes	%
Republican	Russell Fry	1,152	44.8%
Republican	Tyler Servant	856	33.3%
Republican	Roy W Sprinkle	374	14.5%
Republican	Sanford Cox Graves	192	7.5%
Total votes		2,574	100.0%

2015 South Carolina House of Representatives District 106 special Republican primary runoff
Party	Candidate	Votes	%
Republican	Russell Fry	1,738	59.8%
Republican	Tyler Servant	1,167	40.2%
Total votes		2,905	100.0%

2015 South Carolina House of Representatives District 106 special election
Party	Candidate	Votes	%
Republican	Russell Fry	438	98.0%
Write-in		9	2.0%
Total votes		447	100.0%

106th District General Election, 2016
Party	Candidate	Votes	%
Republican	Russell Fry (incumbent)	17,841	99.46
Write-in		97	0.54
Total votes		17,938	100.0
Republican hold			

106th District general election, 2018
Party	Candidate	Votes	%
Republican	Russell Fry (incumbent)	13,198	68.38
TOTAL	Robin Gause	6,088	31.54
Democratic	Robin Gause	5,779	29.94
Working Families	Robin Gause	182	0.94
American	Robin Gause	127	0.66
Write-in		14	0.07
Total votes		19,300	100.0
Republican hold			

106th District General Election, 2020
Party	Candidate	Votes	%
Republican	Russell Fry (incumbent)	24,092	98.46
Write-in		376	1.54
Total votes		24,468	100.0
Republican hold			

Republican primary results, 2022
Party	Candidate	Votes	%
Republican	Russell Fry	43,509	51.1
Republican	Tom Rice (incumbent)	20,927	24.6
Republican	Barbara Arthur	10,481	12.3
Republican	Ken Richardson	6,021	7.1
Republican	Garrett Barton	2,154	2.5
Republican	Mark Struthers McBride	1,676	2.0
Republican	Spencer Morris	444	0.5
Total votes		85,212	100.0

2022 South Carolina's 7th congressional district election
Party	Candidate	Votes	%
Republican	Russell Fry	164,440	64.77%
Democratic	Daryl W. Scott	89,030	35.07%
Write-in		395	0.16%
Total votes		253,865	100.00%
Majority		75,410	29.70%
Republican hold			

2024 South Carolina's 7th congressional district election
Party	Candidate	Votes	%
Republican	Russell Fry (incumbent)	240,326	64.9
Democratic	Mal Hyman	129,522	35.0
Write-in		481	0.1
Total votes		370,329	100.0
Republican hold			

Results by county: Graham: 30–40%; 40–50%; 50–60%; Norman: 30–40%; 40–50%; Fry: 30–40%; 40–50%

Republican special primary results, 2026
Party	Candidate	Votes	%
Republican	Darline Graham (incumbent)	109,881	32.8
Republican	Ralph Norman	82,627	24.6
Republican	Russell Fry	65,955	19.7
Republican	Mark Sanford	50,136	14.9
Republican	Mark Lynch	19,892	5.9
Republican	Danny Ford II	2,804	0.8
Republican	Duke Buckner	1,583	0.5
Republican	Glenda Gail Parker	977	0.3
Republican	Samuel Shepherd	931	0.3
Republican	Mark McBride	769	0.2
Total votes		335,555	100.0

== Personal life ==
Fry is a Baptist. On October 10, 2014, he married Bronwen Fry; they have one son.

U.S. House of Representatives
Preceded by Tom Rice	Member of the U.S. House of Representatives from South Carolina's 7th congressional district 2023–present	Incumbent
U.S. order of precedence (ceremonial)
Preceded by Maxwell Frost	United States representatives by seniority 309th	Succeeded by Robert Garcia
