= Mark Struthers McBride =

Mayor of Myrtle Beach, South Carolinad (1998–2006)

Mayor of Myrtle Beach, South Carolina
- In office 1998–2006
- Preceded by: Robert M. Grissom
- Succeeded by: John Rhodes

Personal details
- Born: Mark Struthers McBride
- Party: Republican
- Spouse: Laura
- Children: 2
- Education: University of South Carolina

Mark Struthers McBride is an American politician and businessman who was mayor of Myrtle Beach, South Carolina. A member of the Republican Party, he served as mayor from 1998 to 2006.

== Early life, family and education ==
McBride graduated from the University of South Carolina.

== Political career ==
=== City Council ===
McBride served on Myrtle Beach City Council from 1994 to 1997.

=== Mayor of Myrtle Beach ===
In 1997, McBride defeated incumbent Robert Grissom in a runoff for Mayor of Myrtle Beach. The position of mayor has the same political power as the city's other council members.

=== 2004 US Senate election ===
McBride joined a six-candidate field in the race for the US Senate seat of retiring incumbent Fritz Hollings. McBride was defeated in the Republican primary, coming in fifth place; the eventual runoff winner was Jim DeMint.

=== 2005 mayoral election ===
After serving two terms, McBride was defeated by challenger John Rhodes in 2005, with 1,898 votes to Rhodes's 2,474 in a runoff.

=== 2020 South Carolina House District 107 race ===
With the unexpected resignation of incumbent Alan D. Clemmons, McBride joined the race for South Carolina House District 107. He was defeated by Case Brittain.

=== 2022 US Congressional District 7 election ===
In 2021, McBride announced his intent to challenge US House incumbent Tom Rice. He joined a field of seven candidates and placed sixth, with the Republican primary won by Russell Fry.

=== 2026 US Senate Republican special primary ===
On June 12, 2026, McBride announced a petition campaign to be on the US Senate ballot as an independent, with ten thousand signatures needed. With the unexpected death of US Senate incumbent and Republican nominee Lindsey Graham, a Republican special primary was set for August 11. McBride filed for the seat on July 21, 2026. He was defeated in the first round of the special primary, placing last in a field of ten candidates.
