= Dennis McKinney =

American politician (born 1960)

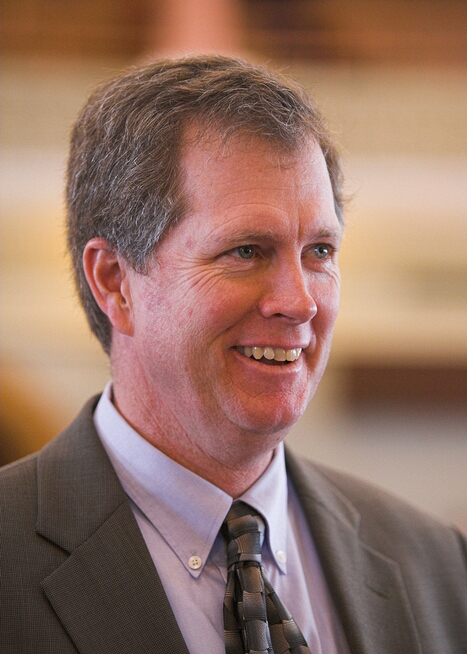

38th Kansas State Treasurer
- In office January 6, 2009 – January 10, 2011
- Governor: Kathleen Sebelius; Mark Parkinson
- Preceded by: Lynn Jenkins
- Succeeded by: Ron Estes

Minority Leader of the Kansas House of Representatives
- In office 2002–2008
- Preceded by: Jim Garner
- Succeeded by: Paul Davis

Member of the Kansas House of Representatives from the 116th district
- In office January 13, 2003 – January 6, 2009
- Preceded by: Ethel Peterson
- Succeeded by: Pat Maloney

Member of the Kansas House of Representatives from the 108th district
- In office January 11, 1993 – January 13, 2003
- Preceded by: Lee Hamm
- Succeeded by: Josh Svaty

Personal details
- Born: July 24, 1960 (age 66) Coldwater, Kansas, U.S.
- Party: Democratic
- Spouse: Jean McKinney
- Children: 2
- Education: Wichita State University (BA, MPA)

Dennis McKinney (born July 24, 1960) is a former Kansas State Treasurer. He was a member of the Kansas House of Representatives where he represented the 116th House District for ten terms, the last six as the Democratic Party's leader (Minority Leader) in the Kansas House. In January 2017, he was a Democratic candidate for the party's nomination as the 4th District of Kansas nominee in the U.S. House of Representatives. At the Democrats' 4th District nominating convention February 10, 2017, he narrowly lost to James Thompson.

== Early life, education & career ==
McKinney, the youngest in a fourth-generation family of settlers was born in the Coldwater, Kansas hospital. He was raised on a farm astride the Comanche and Kiowa county line, south of Greensburg, Kansas, which is the county seat of Kiowa County.

He graduated with a B.A. from Wichita State University, where he also earned a master's degree in Public Administration (MPA). He and his wife Jean (a public school paraprofessional), reside on the south side of Greensburg, where they raised daughters Kelly and Lindy.

Despite heavy involvement in politics, McKinney continued his career in farming and ranching through 2017.

== Political & public service career ==
=== Kansas Development Finance Authority ===
In 1991, McKinney was a member of the Board of the Kansas Development Finance Authority

=== Kiowa County Commission ===
From January 1989 through May 1992, prior to serving in the Kansas Legislature, McKinney was a Kiowa County Commissioner.

=== Kansas House of Representatives ===
After being appointed to a vacancy in his district's seat in the Kansas House of Representatives in May 1992, he was subsequently re-elected to the seat for nine more terms. His 116th Kansas House District covers a large portion of rural south central Kansas, including Kiowa county, Barber County, Comanche County, Kingman County, northern Harper County, and southeastern Ford County.

During his tenure, McKinney was noted largely for promoting public education, and pushing to preserve funding for education and health services, particularly for the elderly and disabled.

He particularly emphasized "constituent services" to district constituents needing a personal advocate in Topeka to help solve their problems with state government.

==== House Minority Leader ====
He was elected by fellow Democrats as the Minority Leader in that body, leading the House Democrats from January 2003 until his resignation from the legislature in December 2008. As Leader, he served on legislature leadership councils, including the State Finance Council, the Calendar and Printing Committee, the Interstate Cooperation Committee and the Legislative Coordinating Council. He also directed organizing activities of the minority caucus, and streamlined legislative business, and worked across party lines successfully.

He resigned in 2008 to accept a gubernatorial appointment as state treasurer, and was replaced in the Kansas House of Representatives by Pat Maloney of Kingman, Kansas.

=== Kansas State Treasurer ===
On November 18, 2008 Governor Kathleen Sebelius appointed McKinney Kansas State Treasurer to replace outgoing Treasurer Lynn Jenkins, who had been elected to Congress representing the 2nd Kansas District. McKinney resigned from his legislative post in order to assume duties as Treasurer on January 5, 2009.

While working with essentially the same staff and budget as his predecessor, McKinney managed a "major increase" in the amount of state-held unclaimed property returned to Kansans. With a booth at the Kansas State Fair, McKinney outreached taxpayers to familiarize them with the office role in locating unclaimed property. In 2010, his staff helped about 1,000 Fair attendees to recover $201,397 that was due to them which was being held in trust by the state.

He was defeated in 2010 by Republican Ron Estes.

=== Greensburg City Manager (interim) ===
Following the sudden 2010 resignation of Greensburg City Manager Steve Hewitt, who had guided Greensburg through its tornado-disaster recovery, McKinney accepted, for three months, the job of interim City Manager, until a replacement could be found. McKinney's focus was on continuing the massive recovery from one of the nation's worst tornado disasters, which had destroyed the entire town—emphasizing continuing support for Greenburg's nationally noted energy-efficient, environmentally-sensitive "green" renovation.

=== Kansas Historical Foundation board ===
In 2015, at the Kansas Historical Society, McKinney was elected to the Board of Directors of the Kansas Historical Foundation.

=== Kansas Racing and Gaming Commission ===
McKinney was appointed to the Kansas Racing and Gaming Commission in March 2011, by Governor Sam Brownback, and was listed, in January 2017, as the Vice Chair of the Commission, which oversees and regulates gambling and animal-racing in Kansas.

=== U.S. House of Representatives candidate ===
==== District opening & history ====
McKinney announced his candidacy to seek the Democratic party's nomination for Kansas's 4th congressional district in the 2017 special election to fill the vacancy left by the departure of new CIA Director Mike Pompeo. The seat, in a strongly Republican district, had not been won by a Democrat since popular moderate Dan Glickman narrowly lost his re-election bid for a 10th term in 1994. In the 2016 General Election, the Republican nominees for President (Trump) and Congress (Pompeo) overwhelmingly defeated the Democratic nominees (Clinton and Giroux), by two-to-one margins in the 4th District. In 2012, federally mandated redistricting resulted in the Fourth District shifting westward into more conservative Western Kansas.

==== Endorsements ====
McKinney secured endorsements for Congress from former Kansas Governor John Carlin, State Senator Oletha Faust-Goudeau, and State Representatives Ed Trimmer and Tim Hodge.

He also had support from labor unions representing over 40,000 workers—particularly the Wichita/Hutchinson Labor Federation of the AFL-CIO, a coalition of 30 local unions representing over 30,000 union members, in South-Central Kansas, including teachers, aviation industry workers, operating engineers, construction workers, electricians, firefighters, state employees, janitors, train operators and other occupations. Another AFL-CIO affiliate, the Building and Construction Trades Council of Central and Western Kansas—a coalition of 13 Kansas building-trades unions, representing over 10,000 members—also endorsed McKinney for Congress.

==== Issue declarations ====
In announcing his candidacy, McKinney blasted Congressional efforts to privatize Medicaid, citing Kansas troubles with that approach in its failing Kancare system.

McKinney also criticized the state's shift from income taxes to higher sales and property taxes, while funding for schools was sharply cut, particularly criticizing state and Congressional moves towards privatizing or cutting education, describing education as "good for the economy," and workforce education as critical to the district's primary manufacturing industry: aviation.

Citing his farmer/rancher background, McKinney claimed his experience with those issues, first-hand, and as a legislator, could bring a competent voice to the drafting of the upcoming Farm Bill, critical to the state's foremost industry, agriculture.

==== Contest ====
McKinney faced four Democratic opponents, none of whom had been elected to public office before. The party nominee was selected by a vote of delegates to the 4th District Democratic convention, at the Sedgwick County Courthouse Jury Room, in Wichita, on Saturday, February 11, 2017. In the first round of voting, by 39 pre-selected party delegates, McKinney and civil rights lawyer James Thompson had the most votes, but neither had the required "50% plus one vote," so they went to a final round of voting, in which Thompson defeated McKinney 21-18.

The general election was held on April 11, 2017, with Thompson facing Kansas State Treasurer Ron Estes, the Republican nominee. Estes won, 52.5 to 47.7%, in a race where the Democratic National Committee chairman Tom Perez refused to provide financial support to Thompson. The National Republican Congressional Committee substantially outspent the Democrat, James Thompson. The NRCC contributed $92,000, in part for last minute "venomous" ads supporting Estes, which without any basis, characterized Thompson as an advocate of taxpayer funded, late term abortions, and those based on gender selection. Prior to the election, it was reported that Estes had raised $459,000 to Thompson's $292,000. Late in the race, the Kansas Democratic party finally contributed $3,000 to the Thompson campaign, but new Democratic National Committee Chair Tom Perez said his organization would not be transferring any funds to the election. Thompson lost to State Treasurer Ron Estes, McKinney's successor, but by 6.2% in a district where the incumbent, Mike Pompeo, and presidential candidate Donald Trump, won by 31% the previous November.

=== After 2017 Congressional race ===
In 2017, McKinney was elected to the board of the Kiowa County Memorial Hospital.

McKinney was appointed to the state government's Pooled Money Investment Board, from 2021 to 2022.

In 2022, President Joe Biden appointed McKinney as Kansas's State Executive Director for the Farm Service Agency (FSA) of the U.S. Department of Agriculture (USDA).

== Tornado and recovery ==
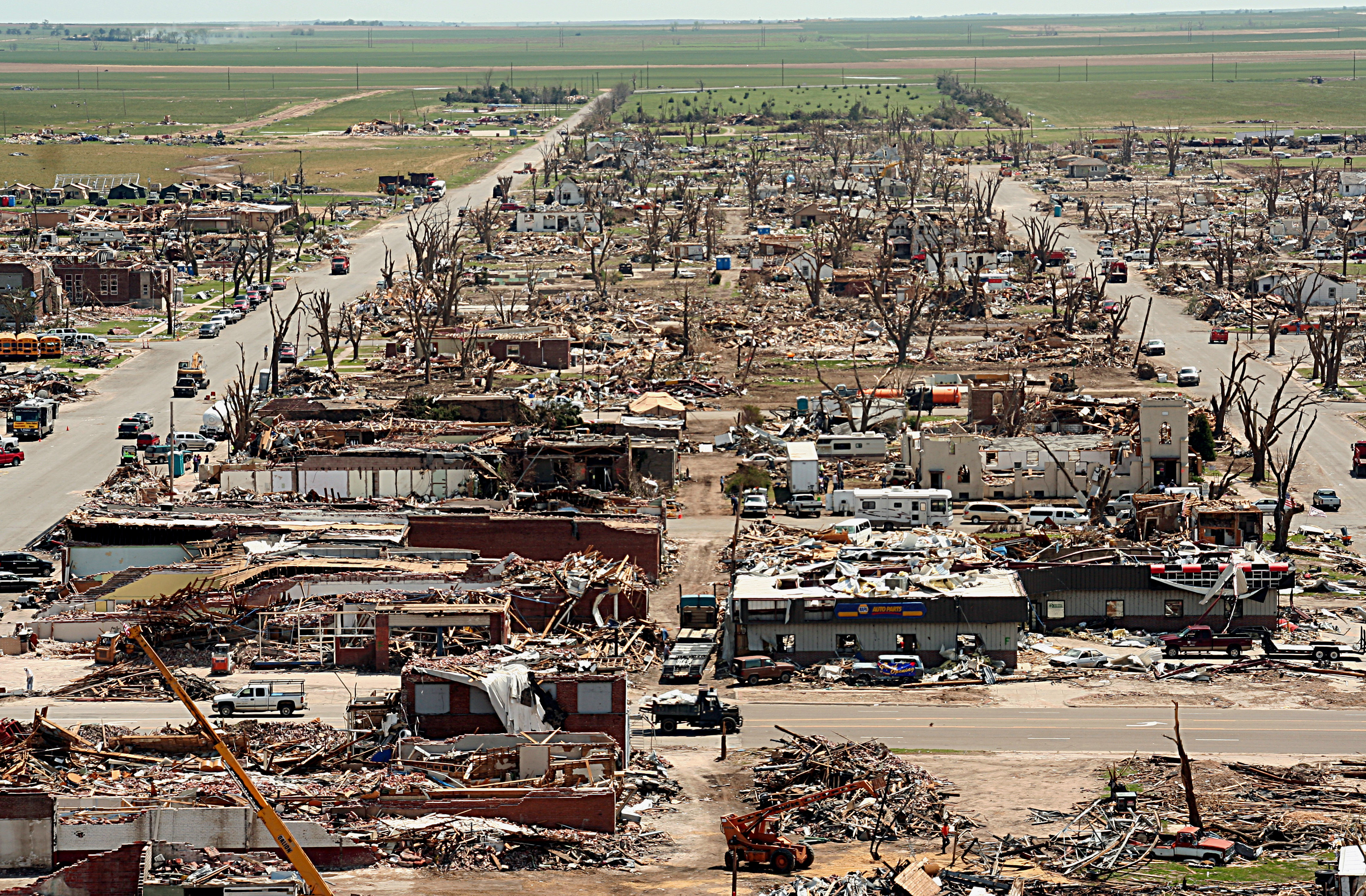
City center, twelve days after the tornado struck (2007)

On the evening of May 4, 2007, the first of a series of powerful storms and one of the strongest tornadoes of the century, an EF5 tornado with a 1.7-mile-swath, and winds exceeding 200 miles per hour (320 km/h), flattened 95% of McKinney's hometown of Greensburg, Kansas.

The tornado left the area without power, plunging it into darkness. The destruction included the city hospital, schools and McKinney's own house in town. Together with his daughter, Lindy, in their basement, they barely survived the complete collapse of their residence.

As the funnel passed, McKinney emerged from the wreckage to search for, and assist, stricken neighbors. Joined by the Superintendent of Schools, Darren Hedrick, they soon found and extricated a mother and her nine-month-old son from where they had been buried, deep in the rubble of her home.

Not all were so fortunate: Out of the roughly 1,500 residents, ten others were killed in Greensburg during the cataclysm, with more dying or found dead later, plus two more in neighboring smaller towns. The destruction caused more than half the now-homeless and traumatized population to depart; a third of the population—500 people—moved away permanently.

McKinney immediately declared his intent to remain and rebuild. With city officials, McKinney helped guide the community in the mobilization of rebuilding efforts and resources. On May 23, still homeless from the storm, McKinney was in the State capitol shepherding a relief bill for Greensburg through the legislature. It passed unanimously in both houses, transferring an additional $25 million to a pre-existing $10 million state emergency fund, and granting another $5 million in business restart grants for the community.

Elected officials from President George W. Bush, Governor Sebelius and U.S. Senator Pat Roberts, soon visited the recovering municipality.

Utilizing state of the art technology, marshalling public, and corporate/private funding, Greensburg was transformed into one of the "greenest" cities in America. A year into the restoration and recovery, McKinney wrote, "The Kiowa County we had a year ago was a testament of the tenacity of our grandparents. The Kiowa County we are building today will be testimony to future generations of our resilience."

Party political offices
Preceded by Larry Wilson	Democratic nominee for Treasurer of Kansas; 2010	Succeeded by Carmen Alldritt
Political offices
Preceded by Lynn Jenkins	Treasurer of Kansas; 2009–2011	Succeeded by Ron Estes
