= Nelson Hardwick =

American politician

Member of the South Carolina House of Representatives from the 106th district
- In office 2005 – May 13, 2015
- Succeeded by: Russell Fry

Personal details
- Born: September 19, 1951 (age 74) Conway, South Carolina, United States
- Party: Republican

Nelson L. Hardwick (born September 19, 1951) is an American politician. From 2005 through 2015, he served as a member of the South Carolina House of Representatives from the 106th District. He is a member of the Republican party.

Hardwick resigned from his seat on May 13, 2015.
