= 2017 Kansas's 4th congressional district special election =

- April 11, 2017

Kansas's 4th congressional district
- Turnout: 28.9%
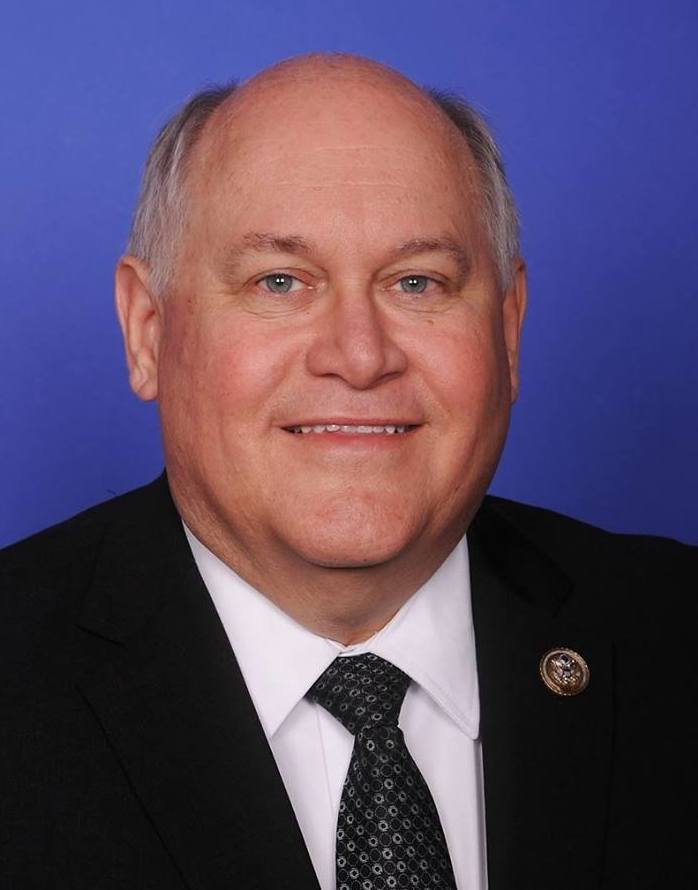

Nominee	Ron Estes	James Thompson
Party	Republican	Democratic
Popular vote	64,044	56,435
Percentage	52.2%	46.0%
County results
Estes
50–60%
60–70%
70–80%
80–90%
Thompson
50–60%
U.S. Representative before election
Mike Pompeo
Republican
Elected U.S. Representative
Ron Estes
Republican

A special election was held on April 11, 2017, to determine the member of the United States House of Representatives for Kansas's 4th congressional district after the incumbent, Mike Pompeo, resigned because of his nomination by President Donald Trump as Director of the Central Intelligence Agency. Republican Ron Estes received 52.2% of the vote and won, while runner-up Democrat James Thompson lost with 46% of the vote.

== Background ==
Kansas's 4th congressional district is located in the south-center region of the state, centering on the city of Wichita and Sedgwick County, which contain approximately two-thirds of the district's voters. Sixteen other counties make up the rest of the district, including Barber, Butler, Chautauqua, Comanche, Cowley, Edwards, Elk, Greenwood, Harper, Harvey, Kingman, Kiowa, Pratt, Stafford, and Sumner counties, as well as a portion of southwestern Pawnee County. Regarded as a conservative district, the seat is considered to be safe for Republicans; (Note: For example, Harry Enten, covering the race for FiveThirtyEight, wrote that "It's a Republican district, full stop.") the Fourth District had a Cook Partisan Voting Index of R+15 following the 2016 presidential election. Going into the election, the seat had not been held by a Democrat in more than twenty years, since Dan Glickman lost his reelection campaign in the 1994 midterms. At the time of the special election, the Republican Party held about a 2-to-1 advantage in voter registration in the district, with 186,850 registered Republicans to 95,788 registered Democrats. Republican Donald Trump won the district by a 27-point margin in the 2016 presidential election, receiving 60% of the vote to Democrat Hillary Clinton's 33%. Republican Mitt Romney defeated Democrat Barack Obama by a similar 26-point margin in 2012, taking approximately 62% of the vote to Obama's 36%.

== Election ==
On January 23, 2017, the U.S. representative for Kansas's 4th congressional district, Mike Pompeo, resigned after being nominated by President Donald Trump as Director of the Central Intelligence Agency. He was confirmed by the United States Senate. Gov. Sam Brownback had five days to declare a special election to be held between 45 and 60 days after being called. The day following Pompeo's resignation, Brownback declared a special election to take place on April 11.

Nominees for each party were selected by a district convention of party activists. Independent candidates were eligible to gain ballot access upon submitting 3,000 signatures within the first 25 days after the election was called.

Although not initially expecting a close race, the National Republican Congressional Committee (NRCC) spent $100,000 on advertising in the last week of the campaign, and Republican politicians Sen. Ted Cruz of Texas, President Donald Trump, and Vice President Mike Pence recorded robocalls or campaigned in person supporting their nominee Ron Estes. On April 10, the Cook Political Report moved the rating of the district to Lean Republican. Estes won the election by 6.2% over political newcomer James Thompson. This not only marked a dramatic shift from the 61.6%–29.6% margin that Pompeo had been re-elected by in the previous year's regularly scheduled election, but this was also the closest race in the district since incumbent Todd Tiahrt, who held the seat from 1995 to 2011, edged out Democrat Randy Rathburn by 3% in 1996.

== Republican Party ==
The Republican Party selected a nominee at a convention held on February 9, 2017.

=== Candidates ===
==== Nominated ====
- Ron Estes, State Treasurer

==== Eliminated at convention ====
- Joseph Ashby, former radio talk show host
- George Bruce, attorney
- Alan Cobb, former Donald Trump campaign staffer
- Todd Tiahrt, former U.S. representative

==== Withdrawn ====
- Eric Kidwell, attorney
- Pete Meitzner, Wichita city councilman

==== Declined ====
- Willis Hartman, businessman
- Mark Hutton, state representative
- Mark Kahrs, state representative
- Ty Masterson, state senator
- Michael O'Donnell, Sedgwick County commissioner
- Susan Wagle, president of the state senate

=== Endorsements ===
Ron Estes

Federal Politicians

- Ted Cruz, Texas senator
- Mike Pence, vice president of the United States
- Donald Trump, president of the United States

=== Results ===
Republican Convention
Candidate	First ballot	Pct.	Second ballot	Pct.
Ron Estes	58	46%	66	52%
Alan Cobb	28	22%	43	34%
Todd Tiahrt	20	16%	17	14%
Joseph Ashby	10	8%	Eliminated	
George Bruce	10	8%	Eliminated	

== Democratic Party ==
The Democratic Party selected a nominee at a convention held on February 11, 2017.

=== Candidates ===
==== Nominated ====
- James Thompson, attorney and U.S. Army veteran

==== Eliminated at convention ====
- Laura Lombard, entrepreneur
- Dennis McKinney, former Kansas State Treasurer and former Minority leader of the Kansas House of Representatives
- Robert Tillman, nominee for this seat in 2012 and candidate for this seat in 2016
- Charlie Walker, police officer

==== Withdrawn ====
- Kevass Harding, former Wichita School Board member

==== Declined ====
- Carl Brewer, former mayor of Wichita
- Dan Giroux, attorney and nominee for this seat in 2016
- Henry Helgerson, state representative
- Jim Ward, state representative

=== Endorsements ===
James Thompson

U.S. senators

- Bernie Sanders, U.S. senator from Vermont

Organizations

- Our Revolution

=== Results ===
Democratic Convention
Candidate	First ballot	Pct.	Second ballot	Pct.
James Thompson	17	44%	21	54%
Dennis McKinney	16	41%	18	46%
Laura Lombard	3	8%	Eliminated	
Charlie Walker	3	8%	Eliminated	
Robert Tillman	0	0%	Eliminated	

== Libertarian Party ==
The Libertarian Party selected a nominee at a convention held on February 11, 2017.

=== Candidates ===
==== Nominated ====
- Chris Rockhold, educator

==== Eliminated at convention ====
- Gordon Bakken, candidate for this seat in 2016
- John Kostner, farmer and rancher

=== Results ===
Libertarian Convention
Candidate	First ballot	Pct.
Chris Rockhold	17	85%
Gordon Bakken	3	15%
John Kostner	0	0%

== General election ==
=== Predictions ===
Source	Ranking	As of
The Cook Political Report	Lean R	April 10, 2017
Inside Elections	Lean R	April 7, 2017

=== Polling ===
Poll source	Date(s) administered	Sample size	Margin of error	Ron Estes (R)	James Thompson (D)	Chris Rockhold (L)	Undecided
Lincoln Park Strategies (D-Thompson)	Late February 2017	500	± 4.4%	56%	32%	4%	–

=== Results ===
The Associated Press called the election for Estes while he was leading by 6% with 88% of precincts reporting. The lead was 6.2% when all the votes were tallied.

Kansas's 4th congressional district special election, 2017
Party	Candidate	Votes	%	±%
Republican	Ron Estes	64,044	52.2%	−8.5%
Democratic	James Thompson	56,435	46.0%	+16.4%
Libertarian	Chris Rockhold	2,115	1.7%	−1.1%
Total votes		122,594	100.0%	
Republican hold				

== See also ==
- List of special elections to the United States House of Representatives
- 2016 United States House of Representatives elections in Kansas
- 2005 Ohio's 2nd congressional district special election
