= Ron Estes =

American politician (born 1956)

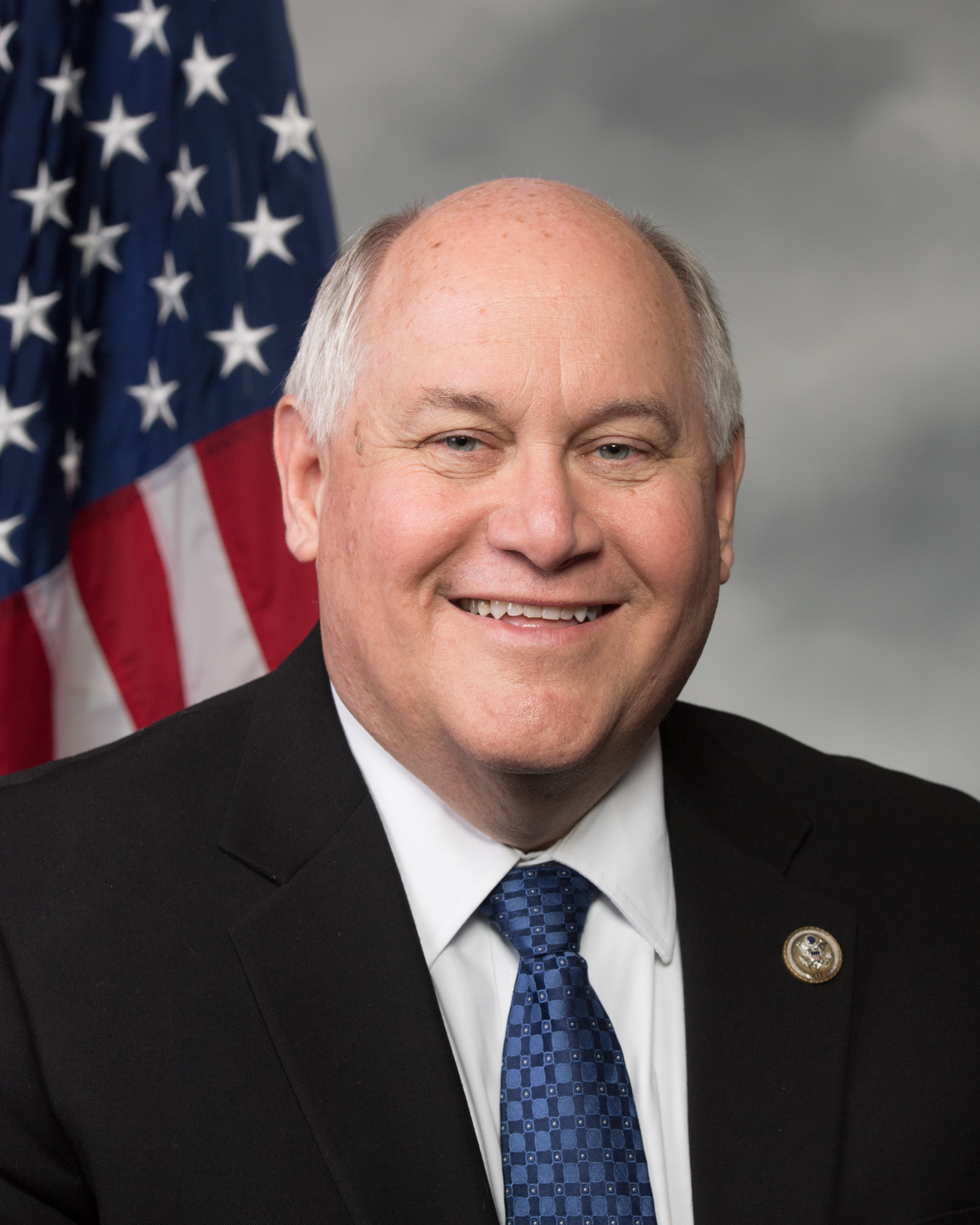

Member of the U.S. House of Representatives from Kansas's 4th district
- Incumbent
- Assumed office April 11, 2017 (Note: Estes's official service begins on the date of the special election, while he was not sworn in until April 25, 2017.)
- Preceded by: Mike Pompeo

39th Treasurer of Kansas
- In office January 10, 2011 – April 25, 2017
- Governor: Sam Brownback
- Preceded by: Dennis McKinney
- Succeeded by: Jake LaTurner

Treasurer of Sedgwick County
- In office 2004–2010
- Preceded by: Jan Kennedy
- Succeeded by: Linda Kizzire

Personal details
- Born: Ronald Gene Estes; July 19, 1956 (age 70) Topeka, Kansas, U.S.
- Party: Republican
- Spouse: Susan Estes
- Children: 3
- Education: Tennessee Technological; University (BS, MBA)
- Website: House website
- Estes's voice Estes on the death of John Lewis. Recorded July 29, 2020

Ronald Gene Estes (/ˈɛstɪs/ ESS-tiss; born July 19, 1956) is an American politician and civil engineer serving as the U.S. representative for Kansas's 4th congressional district since 2017. A member of the Republican Party, he previously served as the 39th Kansas State Treasurer from 2011 until his resignation in 2017 and as treasurer of Sedgwick County from 2004 to 2010.

A fifth-generation Kansan, Estes studied engineering and business at Tennessee Tech. He began his career as a consultant and executive in various manufacturing and service industries. Estes was elected treasurer of Sedgwick County in 2004 and reelected in 2008. He was elected Kansas State Treasurer in 2010 and reelected in 2014. After U.S. Representative Mike Pompeo resigned to become Director of the Central Intelligence Agency, Estes won the special election for the seat and was sworn in on April 25, 2017. He is the dean of Kansas's House delegation.

== Early life and education ==
Estes was born in Topeka, Kansas, and is a fifth-generation Kansan. He earned a Bachelor of Science degree in civil engineering and a Master of Business Administration from Tennessee Tech, where he was selected for membership in Omicron Delta Kappa - The National Leadership Honor Society.

== Career ==
=== Business ===
Estes worked in consulting and management roles in the aerospace, oil and gas, automotive, and several other manufacturing and service industries, working for several companies, including Andersen Consulting, Procter & Gamble, Koch Industries, and Bombardier Learjet.

=== County treasurer ===
Estes was elected treasurer of Sedgwick County, Kansas, home to Wichita, in 2004, and reelected in 2008. During his political career, he also served as treasurer for the Kansas County Treasurer's Association, and in several posts in the Republican Party, including vice chair of the Kansas Republican Party.

=== Kansas State Treasurer ===
Estes ran for Kansas State Treasurer in 2010 against incumbent Democrat Dennis McKinney. Estes was the first statewide elected official from Wichita in two decades. He was reelected in 2014, defeating Carmen Alldritt.

As state treasurer, Estes managed more than $24 billion in public money and he came in under budget by over $600,000. He made it a priority to tell Kansans about unclaimed money, such as funds from forgotten bank accounts. In 2016, Estes said his office had returned $100 million in unclaimed property since 2010.

In the 2016 U.S. presidential election, Estes endorsed Marco Rubio for the Republican nomination in February, before Kansas's presidential caucuses. Estes served in the Electoral College and cast his electoral vote for Donald Trump.

== U.S. House of Representatives ==
=== Elections ===
==== 2017 special election ====
Mike Pompeo, who represented Kansas's 4th congressional district in the United States House of Representatives, resigned on January 23, 2017, to become Director of the Central Intelligence Agency. On February 9, Estes won the Republican nomination to run in the special election to determine Pompeo's successor. Estes won with 66 of 126 votes in a special nominating convention held at Friends University.

The Democratic nominee in the special election was James Thompson, a Wichita lawyer and veteran. Estes was endorsed by many Republicans, including President Donald Trump, Vice President Mike Pence, Senator Ted Cruz, House Speaker Paul Ryan, and Governor Sam Brownback. He was also endorsed by the editorial board of The Wichita Eagle.

The National Republican Congressional Committee contributed $92,000, in part for "inflammatory and false" advertisements supporting Estes, which characterized Thompson as an advocate of taxpayer-funded, late-term abortions, and as an advocate for gender-selection abortion. According to April 10, 2017, fundraising reports, Estes had raised $459,000 to Thompson's $292,000.

Estes won the special election on April 11, 2017, 52.2% to 46%.

==== 2018 regular election ====
In the 2018 election, Estes was challenged in the primary by a candidate with a similar name, Ron M. Estes. This led to a conundrum as to how the candidates should be distinguished on the ballot, with Kansas Secretary of State Kris Kobach deciding that Ron G. Estes could include the prefix "Rep." on the ballot according to Kansas law, although Ron M. Estes complained that this was unfair. The incumbent won with 81.4% of the vote. In the general election, Estes defeated James Thompson in a rematch with 59.4% of the vote.

=== Tenure ===
Estes was sworn into office on April 25, 2017.

In December 2017, Estes voted for the Tax Cuts and Jobs Act of 2017. In an op-ed for the Wichita Eagle, he said he was "confident it will make a real difference for families and businesses in Kansas", that it would provide economic and job growth, and that workers would see larger paychecks. Estes says the tax-filing process had been simplified, even though the process remains the same.

In July 2017, Estes received national attention for interrupting Representative Kathleen Rice mid-sentence while she asked a question at a Homeland Security subcommittee hearing. Rice tweeted "Day in the life. Worth noting there are men from both parties who don't act like this" and included a video of the exchange. Estes explained that he was simply trying to follow committee rules after Rice's time was up.

==== April 2025 Trip to El Salvador ====
In April 2025, Estes traveled to El Salvador and received a tour of Centro de Confinamiento del Terrorismo (CECOT), a maximum security prison used by the Trump administration to hold U.S. immigrants forcibly removed from the United States, including immigrants like Kilmar Abrego Garcia who were illegally abducted and transported to the prison. After visiting the CECOT prison camp, Estes did not call for the repatriation of Kilmar Abrego Garcia.

=== Committee assignments ===
- Committee on Ways and Means
  - Subcommittee on Social Security
  - Subcommittee on Worker and Family Support

=== Caucus memberships ===
- Congressional Western Caucus
- Republican Study Committee

== Political positions ==
=== Abortion ===
Estes calls himself "proudly pro-life" and supports defunding Planned Parenthood. In the only election debate he attended, where he joined Democrat James Thompson and the campaign manager for Libertarian candidate Chris Rockhold, he repeated the claim that Planned Parenthood had been profiting by selling parts of aborted fetuses.

=== Economic issues ===
Estes supports a balanced-budget amendment to the Constitution and reducing corporate and some personal income tax rates.

=== Health care ===
During the 2017 special election campaign, Estes said that he believes that the American Health Care Act of 2017 did not go far enough to uproot and eliminate the Affordable Care Act, seeking complete repeal.

=== Texas v. Pennsylvania ===
In December 2020, Estes was one of 126 Republican members of the House of Representatives to sign an amicus brief in support of Texas v. Pennsylvania, a lawsuit filed at the U.S. Supreme Court contesting the results of the 2020 presidential election, in which Joe Biden defeated incumbent Donald Trump. The Supreme Court declined to hear the case on the basis that Texas lacked standing under Article III of the Constitution to challenge the results of an election held by another state.

=== Israel ===
Estes voted to provide Israel with support following 2023 Hamas attack on Israel.

== Personal life ==
Ron and his wife, Susan, have three children. His family operates a farm in Osage County, Kansas. Susan Estes is a member of the Kansas House of Representatives.

== Electoral history ==
Kansas Treasurer election, 2010
Party	Candidate	Votes	%
Republican	Ron Estes	481,704	58.5
Democratic	Dennis McKinney (inc.)	341,324	41.5

Kansas Treasurer election, 2014
Party	Candidate	Votes	%
Republican	Ron Estes (inc.)	570,110	67.5
Democratic	Carmen Alldritt	274,257	32.5

Republican Convention
Candidate	First Ballot	Pct.	Second Ballot	Pct.
Ron Estes	58	46%	66	52%
Alan Cobb	28	22%	43	34%
Todd Tiahrt	20	16%	17	14%
Joseph Ashby	10	8%	Eliminated	
George Bruce	10	8%	Eliminated	

Kansas's 4th congressional district special election, 2017
Party	Candidate	Votes	%
Republican	Ron Estes	64,044	52.2%
Democratic	James Thompson	56,435	46.1%
Libertarian	Chris Rockhold	2,115	1.7%
Total votes		122,594	100.0%

2018 Republican primary results
Party	Candidate	Votes	%
Republican	Ron Estes (incumbent)	57,522	81.4
Republican	Ron M. Estes	13,159	18.6
Total votes		70,681	100.0

Kansas' 4th congressional district, 2018
Party	Candidate	Votes	%
Republican	Ron Estes (incumbent)	144,248	59.4
Democratic	James Thompson	98,445	40.6
Total votes		242,693	100.0
Republican hold			

2020 Republican primary results
Party	Candidate	Votes	%
Republican	Ron Estes (incumbent)	87,877	100.0
Total votes		87,877	100.0

Kansas's 4th congressional district, 2020
Party	Candidate	Votes	%
Republican	Ron Estes (incumbent)	203,432	63.7
Democratic	Laura Lombard	116,166	36.3
Total votes		319,598	100.0
Republican hold			

2022 Republican primary results
Party	Candidate	Votes	%
Republican	Ron Estes (incumbent)	102,915	100.0
Total votes		102,915	100.0

Kansas's 4th congressional district, 2022
Party	Candidate	Votes	%
Republican	Ron Estes (incumbent)	144,889	63.3
Democratic	Bob Hernandez	83,851	36.7
Total votes		228,740	100.0
Republican hold			

2024 Republican primary results
Party	Candidate	Votes	%
Republican	Ron Estes (incumbent)	40,100	100.0
Total votes		40,100	100.0

Kansas's 4th congressional district, 2024
Party	Candidate	Votes	%
Republican	Ron Estes (incumbent)	198,465	65.0
Democratic	Esau Freeman	106,632	35.0
Total votes		305,097	100.0
Republican hold			

== See also ==
- Kansas's congressional delegations
- 2020 Kansas elections

Party political offices
Preceded by Lynn Jenkins	Republican nominee for Treasurer of Kansas; 2010, 2014	Succeeded by Jake LaTurner
Political offices
Preceded by Dennis McKinney	Treasurer of Kansas; 2011–2017	Succeeded by Jacob LaTurner
U.S. House of Representatives
Preceded by Mike Pompeo	Member of the U.S. House of Representatives from Kansas's 4th congressional district 2017–present	Incumbent
U.S. order of precedence (ceremonial)
Preceded by Darren Soto	United States representatives by seniority 179th	Succeeded by Jimmy Gomez
