= Patrick Maloney (politician) =

American politician

Member of the Kansas House of Representatives from the 116th district
- In office January 12, 2009 – January 10, 2011
- Preceded by: Dennis McKinney
- Succeeded by: Kyle Hoffman

Personal details
- Party: Democratic
- Spouse: Carole

Patrick Maloney is a former Democratic member of the Kansas House of Representatives, who represented the 116th district. He was appointed in January 2009 to replace Dennis McKinney. Maloney lost his re-election bid to Republican Kyle Hoffman in the 2010 election.

== Committee membership ==
- Transportation
- Agriculture and Natural Resources
