= Pat Maloney Sr. =

American lawyer (1924–2005)

Pat Maloney Sr. (August 9, 1924 – September 11, 2005), also known as PM, was an American trial lawyer. Based in San Antonio, Texas, Maloney was a "firebrand plaintiffs' lawyer known as the king of torts." During his 50-year career, he won verdicts of $1 million or more in 100 cases, and won the first million-dollar verdict in the history of San Antonio.

== Early life, education, and military service ==
Maloney was born to a poor Irish Catholic family in San Antonio, on August 9, 1924.

He enrolled at the University of Texas at Austin in fall 1941 with $50, intending to study journalism. After the Japanese attack on Pearl Harbor in December 1941, Maloney left college to join the Marine Corps. He served in the Pacific Theater of Operations and was wounded in action on Guam and Iwo Jima, receiving a Purple Heart. Following an honorable discharge, Maloney returned to the University of Texas in 1945, and received a bachelor's degree in journalism in 1948.

Maloney worked as a sportswriter before meeting a law student, Olive Patricia Boger, whom later he married and briefly practiced with. Maloney enrolled in the University of Texas School of Law while still working as a sportswriter; he graduated in 1950.

== Career ==
During a career that spanned 50 years, Maloney was known for his many well-publicized cases, especially in personal injury and products liability. He represented a variety of clients, including the Congregation of Sisters of Charity of the Incarnate Word; Duval County rancher and oil tycoon Clinton Manges; and San Antonio madam, Theresa Brown, whom Maloney once described as "an intellectual giant."

During law school, Maloney thought he would later join the staff of Lyndon B. Johnson as a speechwriter. However, Maloney instead joined became a prosecutor, joining the Bexar County district attorney. He spent three years there, becoming chief trial attorney and first assistant DA. In 1953, after losing an election for Bexar County district attorney, Maloney entered private practice, establishing his own law firm, the Law Offices of Pat Maloney, PC.

Maloney's first multimillion-dollar verdict came against Southwestern Bell Telephone Company in 1976 and 1977. One of Maloney's most notable case arose from a 1975 butane-tank truck disaster near the border town of Eagle Pass, Texas; 16 people died, and many more injured, after the truck swerved, jackknifed, and exploded; setting a mobile home park ablaze. Following a 12-week trial in Del Rio, a state court jury awarded $50.1 million in damages to victims of the disaster; a 14-year-old boy and his father, who Maloney represented, was awarded $26.5 million, a little over half the total amount. This was at that time the largest personal injury verdict in the United States. "Known for his flamboyant courtroom tactics," Maloney was also well known for his "Knowing the Law" television commercials on various legal issues, which he began in 1973.

In 1979, Maloney represented two young Vietnamese brothers in a murder trial. Maloney was not a criminal defense attorney, but took the case pro bono after a San Antonio parish priest with whom Maloney was close told him it was his Christian duty to do so. Maloney's clients were accused of killing a fellow Texas Gulf Coast crab fisherman in Seadrift, Texas "who had terrorized them as part of an orchestrated effort to drive the newly arrived Vietnamese immigrants out of the coastal area." The two fisherman had shot the man six times, and Maloney had "insulted the town where the case was tried (Seguin, Texas) with barroom comments published in the newspaper," yet Maloney's clients were still acquitted of the crime.

In 1989, Maloney was included in Forbes magazine's list of the highest-earning trial lawyers. The next year, Maloney won four more multimillion-dollar verdicts.

Known for his flamboyance, Maloney once represented, pro bono, "Wimpy, a 7-year-old Shetland sheepdog, and her owner, retired Air Force fighter pilot Sam Mencio," who were to be separated because the dog did not have a city dog tag." Maloney won the case; the San Antonio Express-News commented that the dog and her owner "had more legal talent representing them this week on a city court misdemeanor than do most capital murder defendants."

Maloney was an author. He wrote Winning the Million Dollar Lawsuit (1983) and co-authored Trials and Deliberations: Inside the Jury Room (1992). In 1999, he wrote a novel, Give Me Your Tired, Your Poor, which was based on the 1979 Vietnamese fisherman case.

Maloney was a member of the Inner Circle of Advocates.

Maloney died on September 11, 2005, of pulmonary fibrosis, at age 81, at his home in San Antonio. Maloney's wife Olive Patricia Boger, died in 2004. He was survived by five children and five grandchildren.

== Personal life ==
Maloney made himself a promise to himself during his World War II military service that if he survived the war, he would attend Mass every day. Maloney attended the Cathedral of San Fernando each day, arriving so early for the 6 a.m. Mass that the church's rector gave him a key to the cathedral, which he still had with him when he died.

All five of Maloney's children became attorneys.
