= Tom Rice =

American politician (born 1957)

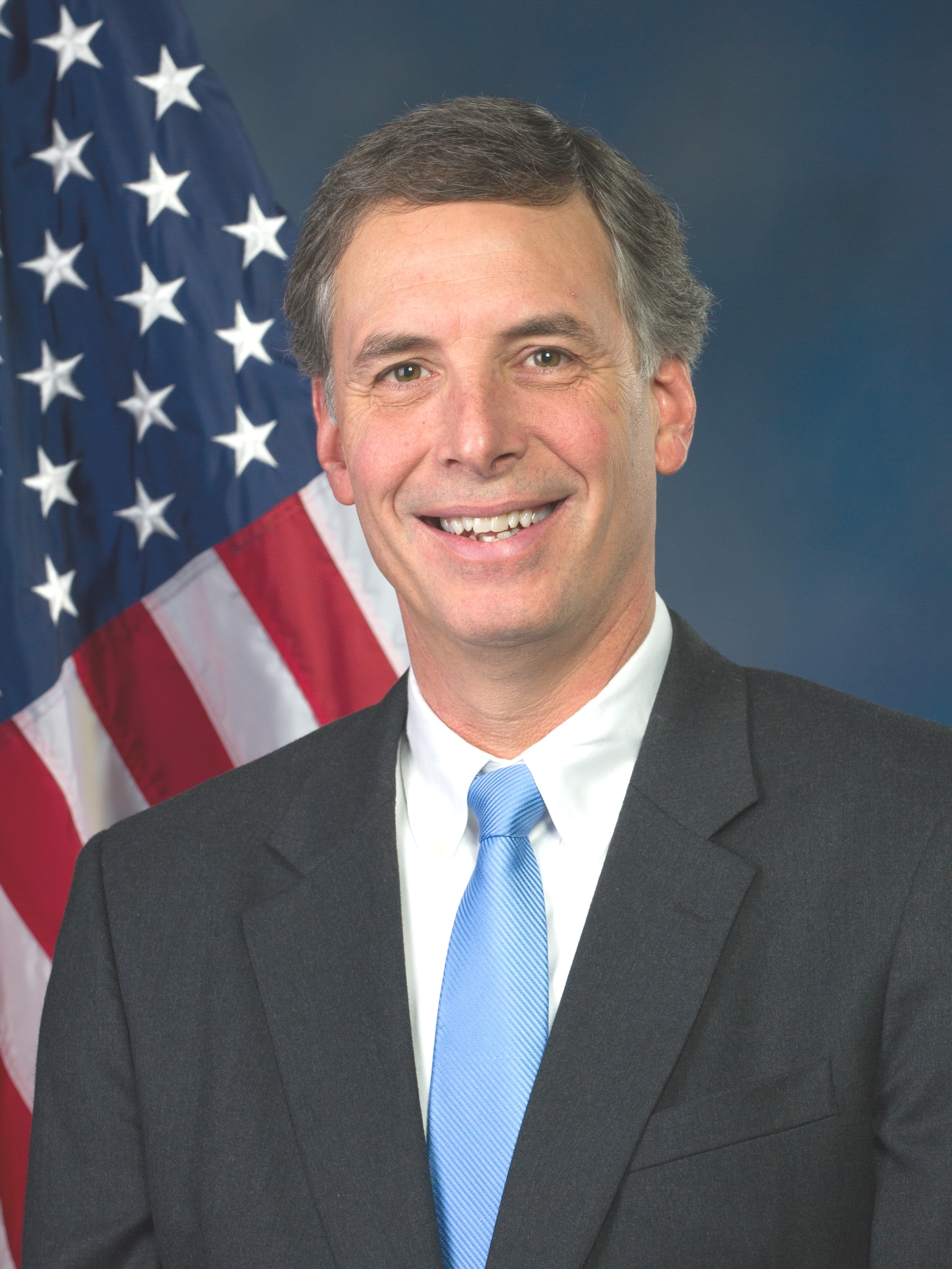
- Official portrait, 2013

Member of the U.S. House of Representatives from South Carolina's 7th district
- In office January 3, 2013 – January 3, 2023
- Preceded by: Constituency reestablished
- Succeeded by: Russell Fry

Personal details
- Born: Hugh Thompson Rice Jr. August 4, 1957 (age 68) Charleston, South Carolina, U.S.
- Party: Republican
- Spouse: Wrenzie Calhoun (m. 1982)
- Children: 3
- Education: University of South Carolina (BS, MS, JD)

Hugh Thompson Rice Jr. (born August 4, 1957) is an American lawyer and politician who served as the U.S. representative for South Carolina's 7th congressional district from 2013 to 2023. The district contained most of the northeastern corner of the state and includes Myrtle Beach, the Grand Strand, Florence, Cheraw, and Darlington. He is a member of the Republican Party.

Rice was first elected in 2012 and was a member of the freshman class chosen to sit at the House Republican leadership table.

In 2021, Rice was one of ten Republicans to vote to impeach Donald Trump, leading to his censure by the South Carolina Republican Party. He became a vocal critic of Trump, who later endorsed Russell Fry, a state representative, to challenge Rice in the Republican primary. In 2022, Rice lost renomination to Fry in a landslide, garnering less than 25% of the vote. This was the worst performance for a House incumbent in a primary with just one incumbent running since 1992.

== Early life and education ==
Rice was born in Charleston, South Carolina, on August 4, 1957. He was four years old when his parents divorced, and his mother, a teacher, took him and his brother Clay to Myrtle Beach. Rice's first job was a busboy when he was 12, and he was variously a night shift fry cook, a grocery store bag boy, and miniature golf course manager while still in high school. Rice was 16 when his father died.

Rice was offered a scholarship to Duke University but enrolled at the University of South Carolina, where he earned a bachelor's degree and in 1979, a master's degree in accounting. In 1982, he earned a Juris Doctor from the University of South Carolina School of Law.

== Early career ==
After college, Rice worked at the accounting/consulting firm of Deloitte & Touche in Charlotte, where he earned his CPA certificate. In 1985 he returned to Myrtle Beach to practice tax law with the law firm Van Osdell, then established his own practice, Rice & MacDonald, in 1997. He was elected chair of the Horry County Council in 2010, serving until he resigned from the position on December 31, 2012, in order to take his seat in Congress.

== U.S. House of Representatives ==
=== Elections ===
==== 2012 ====
Rice was elected to the U.S. House in 2012 as the first representative for the newly created 7th district. He defeated Jay Jordan, Randal Wallace, Dick Withington, James Mader, Chad Prosser, Katherine Jenerette, and Renee Culler in the June 12 Republican primary to advance to a runoff. In the June 26 runoff he defeated Andre Bauer. Rice defeated Gloria Bromell Tinubu in the November 6 general election.

==== 2014 ====
Rice was reelected in 2014, defeating Bromell Tinubu again, with 60.15% of the vote to her 39.85%.

==== 2022 ====
2022 GOP primary results by precinct: Fry: 20–30%; 30–40%; 40–50%; 50–60%; 60–70%; 70–80%; 80–90%; Rice: 30–40%; 40–50%; 50–60%; 90–100%; Arthur: 30–40%; 40–50%; 50–60%; 60–70%; Barton: 20–30%; 30–40%; Richardson: 30–40%

On June 14, 2022, Rice lost the Republican nomination to Russell Fry, and garnered less than 25% of the vote. This was the worst performance for a House incumbent in a primary with just one incumbent running since 1992.

=== Tenure ===
In December 2012, the House appointed Rice to the Committee on Transportation and Infrastructure, the Committee on the Budget and the Committee on Small Business of the 113th Congress.

On January 8, 2013, Congressman Sam Graves appointed Rice chairman of the Subcommittee on Economic Growth, Tax and Capital Access.

On January 22, 2013, Rice was appointed to the following subcommittees: Highways and Transit, Water Resources and Environment, and Coast Guard and Maritime Transportation. He said the appointments would allow him to work for the funding and construction of Interstate 73 as well as the dredging of the Georgetown Port.

On November 11, 2013, Rice was appointed to the water resources conference committee, which helped resolve differences between the House and Senate versions of the Water Resources Reform and Development Act of 2013. The version that passed the House would allow for the dredging of the Georgetown port, a $33 million project that would boost the local economy; Rice said, "I have made it my goal to do whatever it takes to champion South Carolina's ports."

Rice has co-sponsored several pieces of legislation including Safe Schools Act of 2013, a bill to repeal the Affordable Care Act and health care-related provisions in the Health Care and Education Reconciliation Act of 2010 and others.

Rice has pushed changes to port funding and offered victims help to replace Social Security cards and other federal documents after a massive fire destroyed 26 condo buildings in the Myrtle Beach area.

On December 18, 2019, Rice joined all House Republicans in voting against impeaching Trump on both articles.

On January 13, 2021, Rice was one of ten Republicans who voted to impeach Trump a second time. As late as two days before the impeachment debate, he opposed impeaching Trump. But Rice told The Post and Courier that Trump's response to the storming of the Capitol changed his mind. He criticized Trump for neither offering condolences to those who were injured nor expressing regret about the two police officers who died. In a press release, Rice also upbraided Trump for his lack of contrition. Ultimately, Rice said, Trump's "utter failure" in the matter forced him to vote for impeachment. He did so later that day, alongside nine other Republicans.

On January 30, 2021, the South Carolina Republican Party voted to formally censure Rice for his impeachment vote.

On May 19, 2021, Rice was one of 35 Republicans who joined all Democrats in voting to approve legislation to establish the January 6 commission meant to investigate the storming of the U.S. Capitol.

On February 1, 2022, Trump endorsed state representative Russell Fry in the Republican congressional primary in retaliation for Rice's vote for impeachment. Trump said, "Congressman Tom Rice of South Carolina, the coward who abandoned his constituents by caving to Nancy Pelosi and the Radical Left, and who actually voted against me on Impeachment Hoax #2, must be thrown out of office." In March, after a Trump rally in South Carolina where Fry had spoken, Rice responded, calling Trump "a would-be tyrant, because, like no one else I've ever met, he is consumed by spite." "I took one vote he didn't like and now he's chosen to support a yes man candidate who has and will bow to anything he says." "If you want a Congressman who supports political violence in Ukraine or in the United States Capitol...who supports a would-be tyrant over the Constitution...then Russell Fry is your candidate.”

On June 5, 2022, Rice was interviewed on ABC and asserted that he had "no regrets" about his action. When the interviewer told him that, in his obituary, "the first sentence is going to be 'Tom Rice, who was a Republican member of Congress, voted to impeach Donald Trump'", Rice's reply was, "So be it," he said. "I'll wear it like a badge. So be it."

Rice was interviewed by NBC News on June 13, 2022, and when asked about Trump's actions, he said, "He threw a temper tantrum that culminated with the sacking of the United States Capitol" and "It's a direct attack on the Constitution, and he should be held accountable".

=== Committee assignments ===
- Committee on Ways and Means
  - Subcommittee on Trade
  - Subcommittee on Select Revenue Measures

=== Caucus memberships ===
- Republican Study Committee
- United States Congressional International Conservation Caucus
- Republican Governance Group
- Problem Solvers Caucus
- Congressional Taiwan Caucus

== Electoral history ==
2022 U.S. House of Representatives 7th district Republican primary
Party	Candidate	Votes	%
Republican	Russell Fry	43,509	51.1
Republican	Tom Rice (incumbent)	20,927	24.6
Republican	Barbara Arthur	10,481	12.3
Republican	Ken Richardson	6,021	7.1
Republican	Garrett Barton	2,154	2.5
Republican	Mark McBride	1,676	2.0
Republican	Spencer Morris	444	0.5
Total votes		85,212	100.0

2020 U.S. House of Representatives 7th district general election
Party	Candidate	Votes	%
Republican	Tom Rice	224,993	61.8
Democratic	Melissa Ward Watson	138,863	38.1
Write-in		235	0.1
Total votes		364,091	100.0
Republican hold			

2018 U.S. House of Representatives 7th district general election
Party	Candidate	Votes	%
Republican	Tom Rice	142,681	59.6
Democratic	Robert Williams	96,564	40.3
Write-in		309	0.1
Total votes		239,554	100.0
Republican hold			

2014 general election
Party	Candidate	Votes	%
Republican	Tom Rice	102,833	59.95
Democratic	Gloria Bromell Tinubu	68,576	39.98
Independent	Write-in	115	0.07%
Total votes		171,524	100

2012 U.S. House of Representatives 7th district Republican primary
Party	Candidate	Votes	%
Republican	Andre Bauer	12,037	32.13
Republican	Renee Culler	279	0.74
Republican	Katherine Jenerette	1,457	3.89
Republican	Jay Jordan	8,107	21.64
Republican	Jim Mader	180	0.48
Republican	Chad Prosser	3,824	10.21
Republican	Tom Rice	10,252	27.36
Republican	Randal Wallace	691	1.84
Republican	Dick Withington	641	1.71
Total votes		37,468	100

2012 U.S. House of Representatives 7th district Republican primary runoff
Party	Candidate	Votes	%
Republican	Tom Rice	16,844	56.11
Republican	Andre Bauer	13,173	43.89
Total votes		30,017	100

2012 U.S. House of Representatives 7th district general election
Party	Candidate	Votes	%
Republican	Tom Rice	153,068	55.51
Democratic	Gloria Bromell Tinubu	114,594	41.56
Working Families	Gloria Bromell Tinubu	7,795	2.83
Independent	Write-in	281	0.10
Total votes		275,738	100

== Personal life ==
Rice and his family live in Myrtle Beach. He married his wife Wrenzie in 1982 and they have three sons. He is an Episcopalian.

In late May 2020, Rice announced that he refused to wear a face mask in response to the COVID-19 pandemic in the United States while in Congress; in mid-June, he announced that he, his wife, and his son, had all been infected with COVID-19.

U.S. House of Representatives
Constituency reestablished	Member of the U.S. House of Representatives from South Carolina's 7th congressional district 2013–2023	Succeeded by Russell Fry
U.S. order of precedence (ceremonial)
Preceded by Henry Brown as Former U.S. Representative	Order of precedence of the United States as Former U.S. Representative	Succeeded by Norman D'Amours as Former U.S. Representative
