= 2024 South Carolina Republican presidential primary =

- February 24, 2024

50 Republican National Convention delegates

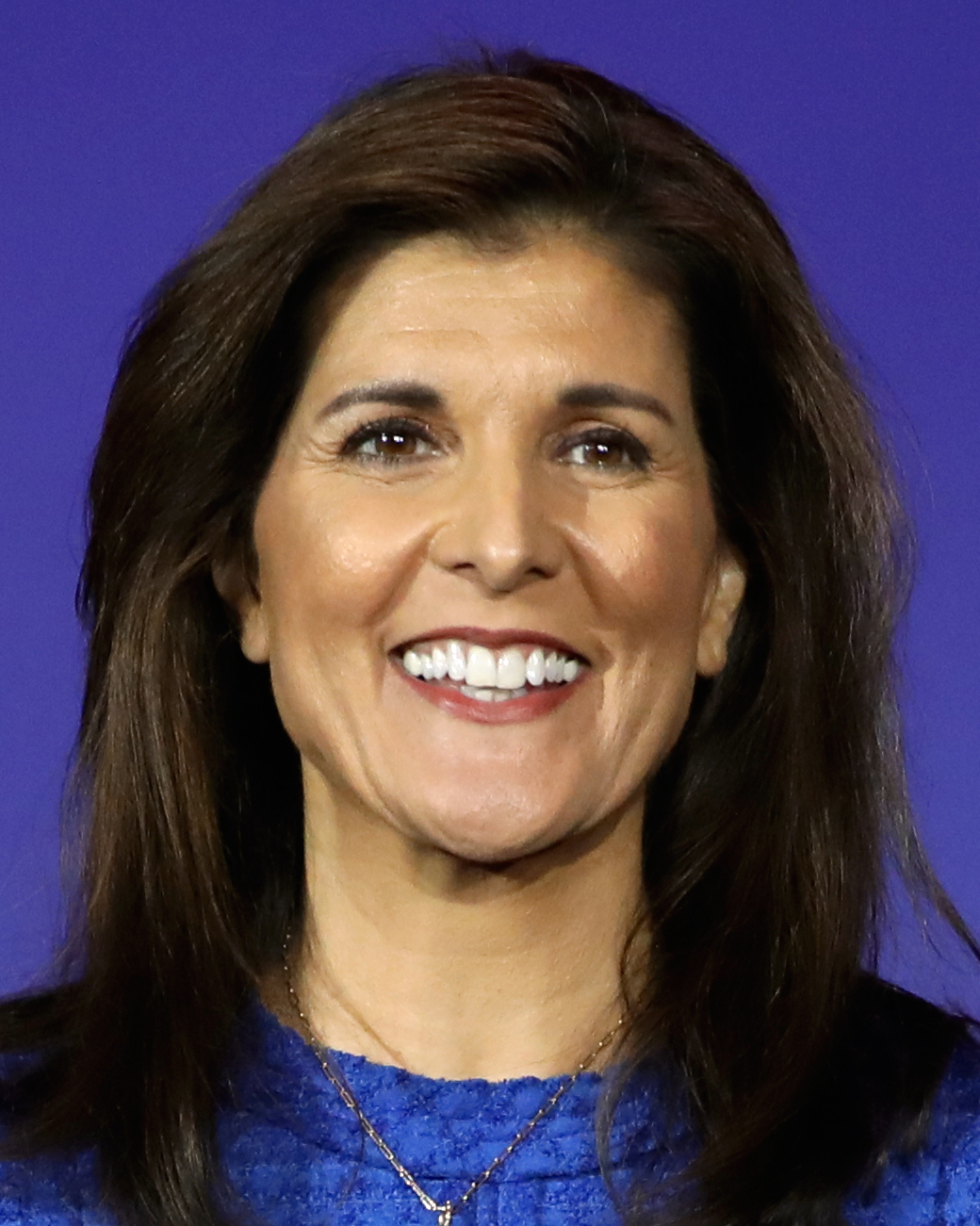
Candidate	Donald Trump	Nikki Haley
Home state	Florida	South Carolina
Delegate count	47	3
Popular vote	452,496	299,084
Percentage	59.79%	39.52%

Trump
50–60%
60–70%
70–80%
80–90%
Haley
50–60%
60–70%

The 2024 South Carolina Republican presidential primary was held on February 24, 2024, as part of the Republican Party primaries for the 2024 presidential election. 50 delegates to the 2024 Republican National Convention were allocated on a selection basis.

Held following the Iowa caucuses, the New Hampshire primary, the Nevada primary and caucuses, and the United States Virgin Islands caucuses, the South Carolina primary was the fifth Republican contest in which delegates were awarded to take place this election. South Carolina holds the "first in the South" presidential primary for both major parties.

Nikki Haley, who served as Governor of South Carolina from 2011 to 2017, announced her presidential candidacy in February 2023. Tim Scott, who has represented South Carolina in the U.S. Senate since 2013, entered the race with a campaign announcement in May 2023. He suspended his campaign on November 12, 2023 and endorsed Trump on January 19, 2024.

Immediately after polls closed at 7:00pm EST, multiple media outlets called the primary for Trump. Trump received the highest number of votes of any candidate for either party in the history of the South Carolina primaries, breaking the record previously held by George W. Bush in 2000.

== Background ==
The Republican electorate in South Carolina is noted for having a high proportion of evangelical voters. Socially conservative candidates have performed well in the South Carolina primary in past contests. In the 2012 Republican primary, Newt Gingrich beat eventual nominee Mitt Romney in the state with support from evangelical voters.

In the 2016 South Carolina Republican primary, Donald Trump won with 32.51% of the vote, with the nearest opponent Marco Rubio taking 22.48%. Trump reportedly won 34% of the evangelical vote in the primary, with Ted Cruz taking 26%, and Rubio taking 21%.

=== Procedure ===
29 at-large delegates are awarded to the candidate with the highest statewide vote total. Each of the state's seven congressional districts are awarded three delegates. The candidate with the highest vote total in each congressional district are awarded that district's delegates.

== Candidates ==
The following 10 candidates had filed by the end of the filing period on October 31, 2023, and secured ballot access.

- Ryan Binkley
- Nikki Haley
- David Stuckenberg
- Donald Trump
- John Anthony Castro (disqualified due to the check for his registration fee bouncing)
- Tim Scott (withdrawn on November 12, 2023)
- Doug Burgum (withdrawn on December 4, 2023)
- Chris Christie (withdrawn on January 10, 2024)
- Vivek Ramaswamy (withdrawn on January 15, 2024)
- Ron DeSantis (withdrawn on January 21, 2024)

== Endorsements ==
Nikki Haley

U.S. Representatives

- Ralph Norman, SC-05 (2017–present)
- Gresham Barrett, SC-03 (2003–2011)

State senators

- Katrina Shealy, District 23 (2013–present)
- Shane Massey, District 25 (2007–present); Majority Leader (2016–present)
- Larry Grooms, District 37 (1997–present)
- Chip Campsen, District 43 (2004–present)
- Tom Davis, District 46 (2009–present)

State representatives

- Mike Neese, District 44 (2023–present)
- Chris Wooten, District 69 (2018–present)
- Nathan Ballentine, District 71 (2005–present)
- Bart Blackwell, District 81 (2016-present)

Mayors

- Brenda Bethune, Myrtle Beach (2018–present)
- William S. Cogswell Jr., Charleston (2024-present)

Former party official

- Katon Dawson, chair of the South Carolina Republican Party (2002–2009)
Donald Trump

Former federal executive officials

- Katie Arrington, Under Secretary of Defense for A&S CISO (2019–2022)
- Peter McCoy Jr., U.S. Attorney for South Carolina (2020–2021)
- Ed McMullen, Ambassador to Switzerland and Liechtenstein (2017–2021)

U.S. Senators

- Lindsey Graham (2003–present)
- Tim Scott (2013–present) (former candidate for president)

U.S. Representatives

- Jeff Duncan, SC-03 (2011–present)
- Russell Fry, SC-07 (2023–present)
- Nancy Mace, SC-01 (2021–present)
- William Timmons, SC-04 (2019–present)
- Joe Wilson, SC-02 (2001–present)

Governor

- Henry McMaster (2017–present)

State executive officials

- André Bauer, Lieutenant Governor (2003–2011)
- Pamela Evette, Lieutenant Governor (2019–present)
- Curtis Loftis, State Treasurer (2011–present)
- Alan Wilson, Attorney General of South Carolina (2011–present)

State senator

- Ronnie Cromer, 18th district (2003–present) (previously endorsed Tim Scott)

State representatives

- Bruce Bannister, 24th district (2006–present) (previously endorsed Tim Scott)
- Thomas Beach, District 10 (2022–present)
- Brandon Cox, 92nd district (2022–present) (previously endorsed Tim Scott)
- Cal Forrest, District 39 (2016–present)
- Doug Gilliam, District 42 (2018–present)
- Patrick Haddon, District 19 (2019–present)
- Kevin Hardee, 105th district (2012–present)
- Davey Hiott, Majority Leader of the South Carolina House of Representatives (2022–present) and 4th district (2005–present)
- Thomas Val Guest, 106th district (2022–present)
- Stewart Jones, District 14 (2019–present)
- Jeff Johnson, 58th district (2014–present) (previously endorsed Tim Scott)
- Jay Jordan, 63rd district (2015–present)
- Jay Kilmartin, District 85 (2022–present)
- Randy Ligon, 43rd district (2018–present)
- Phillip Lowe, 60th district (2007–present)
- Cody Mitchell, 65th district (2022–present)
- Weston J. Newton, 120th district (2013–present) (previously endorsed Tim Scott)
- David O'Neal, District 66 (2022–present)
- Melissa Lackey Oremus, District 84 (2019–present)
- Robby Robbins, 97th district (2022–present)
- Bill Sandifer III, 2nd district (1995–present)
- Mark Smith, 99th district (2020–present) (previously endorsed Tim Scott)
- Murrell Smith Jr., District 67 (2001–present); Speaker (2022–present)
- David Vaughan, 27th district (2022–present)
- Jay West, 7th district (2016–present)

Notable individuals

- Mark Burns, pastor
- L. Lin Wood, former attorney

=== Withdrawn candidates ===
Ron DeSantis (withdrawn)

Former federal executive official

- Mick Mulvaney, U.S. Special Envoy for Northern Ireland (2020–2021); Acting White House Chief of Staff (2019–2020); Director of the Office of Management and Budget (2017–2020); Director of the Consumer Financial Protection Bureau (2017–2018); U.S. Representative from SC-05 (2011–2017)

State senators

- Rex Rice, District 2 (2016–present)
- Dwight Loftis, District 6 (2019–present)
- Danny Verdin, District 9 (2001–present)
- Josh Kimbrell, District 11 (2020–present)

State representatives

- Ashley Trantham, District 28 (2018–present)
- Dennis Moss, District 29 (2007–present)
- Travis Moore, District 33 (2020–present)
- Roger Nutt, District 34 (2020–present)
- Steven Long, District 37 (2016–present)
- Sandy McGarry, District 44 (2020–2022)
- Brandon Guffey, District 48 (2023–present)
- Bill Hixon, District 83 (2010–present)
- Bill Taylor, District 86 (2010–present) (previously endorsed Scott)
- Micah Caskey, District 89 (2017–present)
- Chris Murphy, District 98 (2010–present)
- Joe Bustos, District 112 (2020–present)
- Lin Bennett, District 114 (2016–2022)
- Gary Brewer, District 114 (2022–present)
- Bill Herbkersman, District 118 (2002–present)
Tim Scott (withdrawn)

Former U.S. Representative

- Henry Brown, SC-01 (2001–2011)

Former governor

- Mark Sanford (2003–2011); U.S. Representative from SC-01 (1995–2001; 2013–2019)

State senators

- Shane Massey, District 25 (2007–present); Majority Leader (2016–present) (switched endorsement to Haley after Scott withdrew)
- Sean Bennett, District 38 (2012–present)
- Chip Campsen, District 43 (2004–present) (switched endorsement to Haley after Scott withdrew)
- Ronnie Cromer, District 18 (2003–present)
- Stephen Goldfinch, District 34 (2016–present)
- Larry Grooms, District 37 (1997–present) (switched endorsement to Haley after Scott withdrew)
- Penry Gustafson, District 27 (2020–present)
- Katrina Shealy, District 23 (2013–present)
- Scott Talley, District 12 (2016–present)
- Ross Turner, District 8 (2012–present)

State representatives

- Bobby Harrell, District 114 (1992–2014); Speaker (2005–2014)
- Bruce Bannister, District 24 (2006–present)
- Liston Barfield, District 58 (1997–2014), (1985–1989)
- Jeff Bradley, District 123 (2014–present)
- Joseph Daning, District 45 (2008–2022)
- Sylleste Davis, District 100 (2016–present)
- Shannon Erickson, District 124 (2007–present)
- Gil Gatch, District 94 (2020–present)
- Jenny Horne, District 94 (2009–2017)
- Jeff Johnson, District 58 (2014–present)
- Brandon Newton, District 45 (2016–present)
- Weston Newton, District 120 (2013–present)
- Mark Smith, District 99 (2020–present)
- Bill Taylor, District 86 (2010–present) (switched endorsement to DeSantis after Scott withdrew)

Mayor

- Daniel Rickenmann, Columbia (2022–present)

== Maps ==
Endorsements by incumbent Republicans in the South Carolina House of Representatives. Endorsed Donald Trump (61) Endorsed Ron DeSantis (4) (withdrawn) Endorsed Nikki Haley (4) Endorsed Tim Scott (2) (withdrawn) No endorsement (17) Non-Republicans (36)

Endorsements by incumbent Republicans in the South Carolina Senate. Endorsed Donald Trump (7) Endorsed Nikki Haley (5) Endorsed Tim Scott (4) (withdrawn) Endorsed Ron DeSantis (1) (withdrawn) No endorsement (13) Non-Republicans (16)

== Polling ==
Aggregate polls

Source of poll aggregation	Dates administered	Dates updated	Nikki Haley	Donald Trump	Other/ Undecided (Note: Calculated by taking the difference of 100% and all other candidates combined.)	Margin
270toWin	February 16–20, 2024	February 21, 2024	34.6%	61.6%	3.8%	Trump +27.0
FiveThirtyEight	through February 23, 2024	February 24, 2024	34.0%	61.6%	4.4%	Trump +27.6
RealClearPolling	February 14, 2024 – February 23, 2024	February 23, 2024	37.5%	60.8%	1.7%	Trump +23.3

Poll source	Date(s) administered	Sample size (Note: Key: A – all adults RV – registered voters LV – likely voters V – unclear)	Margin of error	Doug Burgum	Chris Christie	Ron DeSantis	Nikki Haley	Asa Hutchinson	Mike Pence	Vivek Ramaswamy	Tim Scott	Donald Trump	Other	Undecided
Trafalgar Group	Feb 21–23, 2024	1093 (LV)	± 2.9%	–	–	–	37.5%	–	–	–	–	58.9%	–	3.6% (Note: Listed as undecided and other)
Suffolk University/USA Today	Feb 15–18, 2024	500 (LV)	± 4.4%	–	–	–	35%	–	–	–	–	63%	–	2% (Note: Listed as undecided/other)
Emerson College/The Hill	Feb 15–17, 2024	1197 (LV)	± 2.8%	–	–	–	35.4%	–	–	–	–	57.9%	–	6.7%
Insider Advantage	Feb 14–15, 2024	800 (LV)	± 3.9%	–	–	–	38%	–	–	–	–	60%	1%	1%
Trafalgar Group	Feb 13–15, 2024	1,089 (LV)	± 2.9%	–	–	–	33.6%	–	–	–	–	63.3%	–	3%
The Citadel	Feb 5–11, 2024	505 (LV)	± 5.7%	–	–	–	31%	–	–	–	–	64%	3%	2%
Winthrop University	Feb 2–10, 2024	749 (LV)	± 3.6%	–	–	–	28.7%	–	–	–	–	64.9%	3.3%	2%
Washington Post/Monmouth University	Jan 26–30, 2024	815 (LV)	± 3.9%	–	–	–	32%	–	–	–	–	58%	2%	8%
Fabrizio, Lee & Associates	Jan 28–29, 2024	600 (LV)	± 4.0%	–	–	–	31%	–	–	–	–	66%	–	4%
The Tyson Group/The American Promise	Jan 24–26, 2024	543 (LV)	± 4.4%	–	–	–	31%	–	–	–	–	58%	–	11%
Fabrizio, Lee & Associates	Jan 17–18, 2024	600 (LV)	± 4.0%	–	–	–	28%	–	–	–	–	68%	–	4%
Emerson College	Jan 2–3, 2024	584 (LV)	± 4.0%	–	4.8%	6.6%	25.1%	0.2%	–	3.1%	–	54.4%	–	1.9%
Trafalgar Group	Dec 6–8, 2023	1,087 (LV)	± 2.9%	–	5.8%	14.4%	22.8%	0.3%	–	6.1%	–	48.7%	–	1.9%
Morning Consult	Nov 1–30, 2023	856 (LV)	–	0%	2%	13%	19%	–	–	3%	7%	57%	–	–
Winthrop University Center for Public Opinion & Policy Research	Nov 4–12, 2023	780 (RV)	± 3.51%	0.3%	1.6%	12.5%	18.7%	0.4%	–	3.4%	10.6%	47.6%	2.1% (Note: Someone Else with 1.5%; Refused with 0.6%)	2.7%
Morning Consult	Oct 1–31, 2023	927 (LV)	–	0%	1%	11%	15%	0%	3%	6%	7%	58%	–	–
CNN/SSRS	Oct 18–25, 2023	738 (LV)	± 4.8%	0%	2%	11%	22%	0% (Note: No voters)	2%	1%	6%	53%	0% (Note: Perry Johnson & Someone Else with 0%; Larry Elder with no voters)	1%
Morning Consult	Sep 1–30, 2023	854 (LV)	–	–	1%	10%	13%	0%	3%	6%	7%	59%	0% (Note: Will Hurd with 0%)	1%
Fox Business	Sep 14–18, 2023	809 (LV)	± 3.5%	<0.5%	4%	10%	18%	1%	4%	5%	9%	46%	1% (Note: Will Hurd with 1%; Larry Elder & Perry Johnson with less than 0.5%)	3%
Washington Post/Monmouth University	Sep 6–11, 2023	506 (LV)	± 4.6%	0%	5%	9%	18%	2%	3%	3%	10%	46%	1% (Note: "Someone else" with 1%)	4%
Morning Consult	Aug 1–31, 2023	910 (LV)	–	–	1%	14%	11%	0%	4%	8%	7%	55%	0%	–
Trafalgar Group (R)	Aug 17–19, 2023	1,054 (LV)	± 2.9%	0%	2%	14%	8%	0%	2%	6%	14%	48%	0% (Note: Larry Elder, Will Hurd, Pery Johnson, Francis Suarez and Ryan Binkley with 0%)	1%
Manhattan Institute	July 2023	707 (LV)	± 4.0%	0%	3%	21%	8%	1%	1%	4%	11%	43%	2% (Note: Francis Suarez & "Someone else" with 1%; Larry Elder with 0%)	6%
Morning Consult	July 1–31, 2023	907 (LV)	–	0%	1%	15%	12%	1%	3%	6%	7%	54%	0% (Note: Francis Suarez with 0%)	1%
Fox Business	Jul 15–19, 2023	809 (LV)	± 3.5%	<0.5%	2%	13%	14%	1%	4%	3%	10%	48%	– (Note: Larry Elder, Will Hurd, Francis Suarez, "Other" and "None of the above" with <0.5%)	4%
Morning Consult	June 1–30, 2023	907 (LV)	–	0%	1%	20%	12%	0%	4%	3%	10%	48%	1% (Note: Liz Cheney with 1%; Greg Abbott, Will Hurd, and Kristi Noem with 0%)	1%
National Public Affairs	Jun 20–21, 2023	809 (LV)	–	1%	5%	18%	12%	2%	2%	2%	10%	41%	–	6%
Morning Consult	May 1–31, 2023	875 (LV)	–	–	–	19%	13%	0%	4%	3%	7%	52%	1% (Note: Liz Cheney with 1%; Greg Abbott, Kristi Noem, and Glenn Youngkin with 0%)	1%
National Research (Note: Poll sponsored by American Greatness, which supports Trump)	May 24–25, 2023	500 (LV)	± 4.38%	–	–	18%	10%	1%	1%	1%	12%	43%	1% (Note: Chris Sununu with 1%)	13%
National Public Affairs	May 15–17, 2023	590 (LV)	± 4.0%	–	–	23%	15%	3%	2%	2%	10%	38%	–	8%
Morning Consult	Apr 1–30, 2023	810 (LV)	–	–	–	17%	17%	0%	5%	1%	4%	52%	3% (Note: Liz Cheney with 2%; Glenn Youngkin with 1%; Greg Abbott, Kristi Noem, and Mike Pompeo with 0%)	1%
National Public Affairs	Apr 11–14, 2023	588 (LV)	± 4.2%	–	–	21%	19%	1%	2%	1%	7%	43%	1% (Note: Mike Pompeo with 1%)	6%
Winthrop University	Mar 25 – April 1, 2023	485 (RV)	± 4.6%	–	–	20%	18%	0%	5%	–	7%	41%	5% (Note: Mike Pompeo with 2%, Chris Sununu with 1% Glenn Youngkin with 0%; "Someone else" with 2%)	4%
Morning Consult	Mar 1–31, 2023	806 (LV)	–	–	–	22%	15%	–	5%	0%	4%	49%	3% (Note: Liz Cheney with 2%; Mike Pompeo with 1%; Greg Abbott, Kristi Noem, and Glenn Youngkin with 0%)	2%
Morning Consult	Feb 1–28, 2023	689 (LV)	–	–	–	24%	18%	–	5%	–	7%	43%	4% (Note: Liz Cheney with 2%; Kristi Noem and Mike Pompeo with 1%; Ted Cruz with 1%)	–
Neighbourhood Research and Media (Note: Poll sponsored by Courageous Conservatives PAC)	Feb 7–14, 2023	300 (LV)	± 5.9%	–	–	22%	16%	–	2%	–	2%	35%	–	23%
Morning Consult	Jan 1–31, 2023	974 (LV)	–	–	–	31%	14%	–	2%	–	5%	45%	2% (Note: Liz Cheney and Ted Cruz with 1%; Greg Abbott, Kristi Noem, and Glenn Youngkin with 0%)	1%
Trafalgar Group	Jan 24–26, 2023	1,078 (LV)	± 2.9%	–	–	–	33%	–	6%	–	–	52%	9% (Note: Mike Pompeo with 9%)	–
Trafalgar Group	Jan 24–26, 2023	1,078 (LV)	± 2.9%	–	–	–	21%	–	3%	–	23%	48%	5% (Note: Mike Pompeo with 5%)	–
Trafalgar Group	Jan 24–26, 2023	1,078 (LV)	± 2.9%	–	–	29%	22%	–	4%	–	–	43%	2% (Note: Mike Pompeo with 2%)	–
Trafalgar Group	Jan 24–26, 2023	1,078 (LV)	± 2.9%	–	–	28%	12%	–	2%	–	14%	43%	1% (Note: Mike Pompeo with 1%)	–
Moore Information	Jan 18–24, 2023	450 (LV)	± 5.0%	–	–	31%	12%	–	4%	–	5%	41%	–	7%
Moore Information	Jan 18–24, 2023	450 (LV)	± 5.0%	–	–	–	29%	–	–	–	–	62%	–	9%
Moore Information	Jan 18–24, 2023	450 (LV)	± 5.0%	–	–	42%	–	–	–	–	–	49%	–	15%
Spry Strategies	Jan 17–19, 2023	386 (LV)	–	–	–	52%	–	–	–	–	–	33%	–	15%
Morning Consult	Dec 1–31, 2022	530 (LV)	–	–	–	28%	13%	–	4%	–	5%	44%	6% (Note: Liz Cheney with 2%; Greg Abbott, Ted Cruz, Kristi Noem, and Mike Pompeo with 1%)	–
Winthrop University	Oct 22 – November 5, 2022	1,298 (A)	± 2.8%	–	–	–	37%	–	–	–	–	45%	–	19%
Echelon Insights	Aug 31 – September 7, 2022	294 (LV)	± 5.1%	–	–	33%	–	–	–	–	–	58%	–	9%
Trafalgar Group	Mar 25–29, 2021	1,014 (LV)	± 3.0%	–	–	–	–	–	–	–	–	64%	11% (Note: "Would vote for anyone other than Trump" with 9%; would not vote with 2%)	25% (Note: "Would consider voting for Trump" with 20%; Undecided with 6%)

== Results ==
South Carolina Republican primary, February 24, 2024
Candidate	Votes	Percentage	Actual delegate count		
Candidate	Votes	Percentage	Bound	Unbound	Total
Donald Trump	452,496	59.79%	47		47
Nikki Haley	299,084	39.52%	3		3
Ron DeSantis (withdrawn)	2,953	0.39%			
Vivek Ramaswamy (withdrawn)	726	0.10%			
Chris Christie (withdrawn)	658	0.09%			
Ryan Binkley	528	0.07%			
David Stuckenberg	361	0.05%			
Total:	756,806	100.00%	50	0	50

=== Results by congressional district ===
Trump won 6 of the 7 congressional districts.

District	Trump	Haley
1st	46.8%	52.5%
2nd	55.5%	43.8%
3rd	67.5%	31.8%
4th	59.6%	39.5%
5th	65.5%	33.9%
6th	53.7%	45.6%
7th	67.8%	31.7%
Source: "Election Night Reporting".

=== Results by county ===
County	Donald Trump		Nikki Haley		Others		Margin		Total votes
County	%	#	%	#	%	#	%	#	Total votes
Abbeville	76.35%	2,857	23.01%	861	0.64%	24	53.34%	1,996	3,742
Aiken	60.79%	15,179	38.66%	9,653	0.55%	137	22.13%	5,526	24,969
Allendale	71.26%	238	28.74%	96	0.00%	0	42.51%	142	334
Anderson	68.69%	23,735	30.60%	10,572	0.71%	245	38.10%	13,163	34,552
Bamberg	64.60%	637	34.89%	344	0.51%	5	29.72%	293	986
Barnwell	77.15%	1,604	22.37%	465	0.48%	10	54.79%	1,139	2,079
Beaufort	43.87%	17,083	55.44%	21,591	0.69%	269	-11.58%	-4,508	38,943
Berkeley	59.43%	17,976	39.83%	12,046	0.74%	223	19.61%	5,930	30,245
Calhoun	70.24%	1,397	29.26%	582	0.50%	10	40.98%	815	1,989
Charleston	37.72%	23,881	61.71%	39,072	0.57%	364	-23.99%	-15,191	63,317
Cherokee	85.26%	7,034	14.13%	1,166	0.61%	50	71.13%	5,868	8,250
Chester	78.15%	2,930	21.37%	801	0.48%	18	56.79%	2,129	3,749
Chesterfield	78.57%	3,440	20.76%	909	0.66%	29	57.81%	2,531	4,378
Clarendon	72.09%	2,846	27.51%	1,086	0.41%	16	44.58%	1,760	3,948
Colleton	70.05%	3,134	29.50%	1,320	0.45%	20	40.55%	1,814	4,474
Darlington	73.56%	5,608	25.91%	1,975	0.54%	41	47.65%	3,633	7,624
Dillon	84.61%	2,018	15.18%	362	0.21%	5	69.43%	1,656	2,385
Dorchester	57.11%	11,725	42.03%	8,629	0.86%	177	15.08%	3,096	20,531
Edgefield	73.92%	2,882	25.24%	984	0.85%	33	48.68%	1,898	3,899
Fairfield	65.63%	1,577	33.71%	810	0.67%	16	31.92%	767	2,403
Florence	70.42%	10,401	28.98%	4,280	0.60%	89	41.44%	6,121	14,770
Georgetown	57.14%	7,617	42.34%	5,644	0.52%	69	14.80%	1,973	13,330
Greenville	56.97%	54,123	42.06%	39,952	0.97%	923	14.92%	14,171	94,998
Greenwood	63.77%	6,427	35.66%	3,594	0.57%	57	28.11%	2,833	10,078
Hampton	72.43%	993	26.84%	368	0.73%	10	45.59%	625	1,371
Horry	66.81%	47,986	32.70%	23,489	0.48%	348	34.11%	24,497	71,823
Jasper	57.06%	3,174	42.35%	2,356	0.59%	33	14.70%	818	5,563
Kershaw	65.89%	6,182	33.58%	3,151	0.53%	50	32.30%	3,031	9,383
Lancaster	60.55%	9,485	38.78%	6,075	0.67%	105	21.77%	3,410	15,665
Laurens	76.22%	7,838	23.13%	2,379	0.65%	67	53.08%	5,459	10,284
Lee	78.89%	994	20.24%	255	0.87%	11	58.65%	739	1,260
Lexington	58.11%	27,460	41.21%	19,475	0.68%	323	16.90%	7,985	47,258
Marion	77.07%	1,906	22.40%	554	0.53%	13	54.67%	1,352	2,473
Marlboro	81.92%	1,405	17.43%	299	0.64%	11	64.49%	1,106	1,715
McCormick	62.36%	1,433	36.51%	839	1.13%	26	25.85%	594	2,298
Newberry	64.89%	3,819	34.43%	2,026	0.68%	40	30.47%	1,793	5,885
Oconee	60.19%	10,230	39.21%	6,664	0.61%	103	20.98%	3,566	16,997
Orangeburg	67.26%	3,815	32.18%	1,825	0.56%	32	35.08%	1,990	5,672
Pickens	67.58%	15,613	31.76%	7,337	0.66%	152	35.82%	8,276	23,102
Richland	41.40%	13,697	57.72%	19,098	0.88%	292	-16.32%	-5,401	33,087
Saluda	72.31%	2,309	27.00%	862	0.69%	22	45.32%	1,447	3,193
Spartanburg	69.75%	33,039	29.44%	13,946	0.80%	381	40.31%	19,093	47,366
Sumter	64.85%	5,556	34.44%	2,951	0.71%	61	30.40%	2,605	8,568
Union	84.18%	3,193	15.45%	586	0.37%	14	68.73%	2,607	3,793
Williamsburg	80.01%	1,789	19.54%	437	0.45%	10	60.47%	1,352	2,236
York	57.91%	24,231	41.39%	17,318	0.70%	292	16.52%	6,913	41,841

== See also ==
- 2024 South Carolina Democratic presidential primary
- 2024 Republican Party presidential primaries
- 2024 United States presidential election
- 2024 United States presidential election in South Carolina
- 2024 United States elections

== Notes ==
Partisan clients
