= Endorsements in the 2024 Republican Party presidential primaries =

This is a list of endorsements for declared or potential candidates in the Republican primaries for the 2024 United States presidential election.

== Candidates withdrawn during primary ==
=== Asa Hutchinson ===
Asa Hutchinson

U.S. representatives

- Barbara Comstock, U.S. representative from VA-10 (2015–2019) (co-endorsed with Chris Christie)

County officials

- Barry Moehring, judge of Benton County, Arkansas (2016–present)

Mayors

- Stephanie Orman, mayor of Bentonville, Arkansas (2018–present)

Party officials

- Conrad Lucas, former chair of the West Virginia Republican Party (2012–2018)

Newspapers

- Storm Lake Times

=== Vivek Ramaswamy ===
Vivek Ramaswamy

U.S. representative

- Steve King, former U.S. representative from IA-4 (2013–2021) and IA-5 (2003–2013)

Statewide executive officials

- Roby Smith, state treasurer of Iowa (2023–present)

State legislators

- Richard Brown, New Hampshire state representative from Carroll's 3rd district (2022–present)
- Linda Camarota, New Hampshire state representative from Hillsborough's 7th district (2018–2020)
- Fred Doucette, New Hampshire state representative from Rockingham's 25th district (2014–present); deputy majority leader of the New Hampshire House of Representatives (2020–present) (endorsed Donald Trump after his withdrawal)
- Nate Gustafson, Wisconsin state representative from the 55th district (2023–present)
- Steven Holt, Iowa state representative from the 12th District (2023–present); former Iowa state representative from the 18th District (2014–2023) (switched from Ron DeSantis)
- Dawn Johnson, New Hampshire state representative from Belknap's 3rd district (2020–2022)
- Matt Leber, South Carolina state representative from the 116th district (2022–present)
- David Love, New Hampshire state representative from Rockingham's 13th district (2018–present)
- Mark McLean, New Hampshire state representative from Hillsborough's 15th district (2014–present)
- Fred Plett, New Hampshire state representative from Hillsborough's 29th district (2018–present)
- David Rochefort, New Hampshire state representative from Grafton's 1st district (2022–present)
- Susan Vandecasteele, New Hampshire state representative from Rockingham's 25th district (2020–present)
- Peter Varney, New Hampshire state representative from Belknap's 7th district (2022–present)
- Scott Webster, Iowa State Senator from the 47th district (2023–present) (switched from Ron DeSantis)
- Joshua Whitehouse, New Hampshire state representative from Strafford's 2nd district (2014–2016)

Individuals

- Kathy Barnette, political commentator and Republican nominee for U.S. representative from PA-04 in 2020
- James Fishback, investor
- Jake Paul, boxer and YouTuber
- O. J. Simpson, retired football player, actor, and sports broadcaster (deceased)

== Candidates withdrawn before primary ==
=== Doug Burgum ===
Doug Burgum

U.S. senators

- Kevin Cramer, U.S. senator from North Dakota (2019–present) and U.S. representative from ND-AL (2013–2019) (switched endorsement to Trump after Burgum withdrew)
- John Hoeven, U.S. senator from North Dakota (2011–present) and governor of North Dakota (2000–2010) (switched endorsement to Trump after Burgum withdrew)

U.S. representatives

- Kelly Armstrong, U.S. representative from ND-AL (2019–2024) (switched endorsement to Trump after Burgum withdrew)

Individuals

- Josh Duhamel, actor
- John Fisher, owner of the Oakland Athletics and co-owner of the San Jose Earthquakes and Celtic F.C. (co-endorsed with Ron DeSantis)

=== Chris Christie ===
Chris Christie

Federal officials

- Ronald Gidwitz, U.S. ambassador to Belgium (2018–2021); chair of the Illinois State Board of Education (1999–2003)
- Bobbie Kilberg, director of the Office of Public Liaison (1989–1992)
- Anthony Scaramucci, White House communications director (2017)

U.S. senators

- Jeffrey Chiesa, New Jersey (2013); attorney general of New Jersey (2012–2013)

U.S. representatives

- Charles Bass, U.S. representative from NH-02 (1995–2007, 2011–2013) (switched to Nikki Haley after Christie withdrew)
- Susan Brooks, U.S. representative from IN-05 (2013–2021)
- Barbara Comstock, U.S. representative from VA-10 (2015–2019) (co-endorsed with Asa Hutchinson)
- Adam Kinzinger, U.S. representative from IL-11 (2011–2013) and IL-16 (2013–2023)

State legislators

- J.P. Marzullo, New Hampshire state representative from Hillsborough's 2nd district (2018–2020)

Party officials

- Bill Palatucci, Republican national committeeman from New Jersey (2010–present)

Individuals

- Steve Cohen, founder of Point72 Asset Management and S.A.C. Capital Advisors and owner of the New York Mets
- Cassidy Hutchinson, former White House aide and memoirist

=== Larry Elder ===
Larry Elder

State legislators

- Julius Soti, New Hampshire state representative from Rockingham's 35th district (2022–present)

=== Will Hurd ===
Will Hurd

Federal officials

- Alyssa Farah Griffin, White House director of strategic communications (2020) and co-host of The View (switched to Nikki Haley)

=== Perry Johnson ===
Perry Johnson

Federal officials

- Pete Hoekstra, U.S. ambassador to the Netherlands (2018–2021); U.S. representative from MI-02 (1993–2011)

=== Mike Pence ===
Mike Pence

Federal officials

- Dan Coats, director of National Intelligence (2017–2019), United States senator from Indiana (1989–1999, 2011–2017)
- T. Kenneth Cribb Jr., director of the Domestic Policy Council (1987)
- Donald P. Hodel, secretary of the interior (1985–1989), secretary of energy (1982–1985)
- Larry Kudlow, director of the National Economic Council (2018–2021)
- Marc Short, chief of staff to the vice president (2019–2021)
- Paul Teller, special assistant to the president for legislative affairs (2017–2020)
- Marc Thiessen, White House director of speechwriting (2007–2009)
- Helene von Damm, U.S. ambassador to Austria (1983–1986)

Governors

- Eric Holcomb, governor of Indiana (2017–2025)

U.S. representatives

- Larry Bucshon, U.S. representative from IN-08 (2011–2025)
- Jeb Hensarling, U.S. representative from TX-05 (2003–2019)
- Peter King, U.S. representative from NY-02 (2013–2021) and NY-03 (1993–2013)
- Greg Pence, U.S. representative from IN-06 (2019–2025) (Pence’s brother)

State executive officials

- Art Pope, budget director of North Carolina (2013–2014); Republican nominee for lieutenant governor of North Carolina in 1992
- Victor Smith, Indiana secretary of commerce (2013–2017)

State legislators

- Robert Clegg Jr., New Hampshire senator from the 14th district (2002–2008)
- Todd Huston, speaker of the Indiana House of Representatives (2020–present) from the 37th district (2012–present)
- Michael Murphy, Indiana state representative from the 90th district (1994–2010)

Party officials

- Jeff Cardwell, Indiana Republican Party chair (2015–2017)
- Chip Saltsman, Tennessee Republican Party chair (1999–2001)

Individuals

- Charlotte Bond, writer (Pence's daughter)
- Jack Butler, National Review Online submission editor
- Ron Cameron, owner and chairman of Mountaire Farms (switched to Nikki Haley after Pence withdrew)
- Marjorie Dannenfelser, president of the Susan B. Anthony Pro-Life America
- Edwin Feulner, co-founder of The Heritage Foundation
- Adrie Groeneweg, president and founder of Pizza Ranch
- Quin Hillyer, conservative newspaper columnist and writer
- Jonathan V. Last, editor of The Bulwark
- Rich Lowry, editor-in-chief of National Review
- Forrest Lucas, founder of Lucas Oil
- Karen Pence, teacher and Second Lady of the United States (2017–2021) (Pence's wife)
- Roger Penske, auto racing team owner
- Tony Perkins, president of the Family Research Council (2003-present)
- Scott Reed, campaign manager of the 1996 Bob Dole presidential campaign
- David A. Ricks, president of Eli Lilly and Company
- Joel C. Rosenberg, author
- Warren Stephens, businessman
- Cal Thomas, conservative newspaper columnist and writer

=== Tim Scott ===
Tim Scott

Federal executive officials

- Gary Cohn, director of the National Economic Council (2017–2018) (switched to Nikki Haley)

U.S. senators

- Richard Burr, U.S. senator from North Carolina (2005–2023)
- Cory Gardner, U.S. senator from Colorado (2015–2021)
- Mike Rounds, U.S. senator from South Dakota (2015–present); governor of South Dakota (2003–2011)
- John Thune, U.S. senator from South Dakota (2005–present) and Senate minority whip (2021–present)

U.S. representatives

- Henry Brown, U.S. representative from SC-01 (2001–2011)

Governors

- Bill Haslam, governor of Tennessee (2011–2019); chair of the Republican Governors Association (2017–2018)
- Mark Sanford, governor of South Carolina (2003–2011); U.S. representative from SC-01 (1995–2001 and 2013–2019); Republican candidate for U.S. president in 2020

State legislators

- Bruce Bannister, South Carolina state representative from the 24th district (2006–present)
- Liston Barfield, South Carolina state representative from the 58th district (1985–1989 and 1997–2014)
- Sean Bennett, South Carolina state senator from the 38th district (2012–present)
- Jeff Bradley, South Carolina state representative from the 123rd district (2014–present)
- Chip Campsen, South Carolina state senator from the 43rd district (2004–present) (switched to Nikki Haley after Scott withdrew)
- Michael Chippendale, Rhode Island House minority leader (2022–present) from the 40th district (2011–present)
- Ronnie Cromer, South Carolina state senator from the 18th district (2003–present) (switched to Donald Trump)
- Joseph Daning, South Carolina state representative from the 45th district (2008–2022)
- Sylleste Davis, South Carolina state representative from the 100th district (2016–present)
- Shannon Erickson, South Carolina state representative from the 124th district (2007–present)
- Billy Garrett, South Carolina state senator from the 10th district (2020-present)
- Gil Gatch, South Carolina state representative from the 94th district (2020–present)
- Stephen Goldfinch, South Carolina state senator from the 34th district (2016–present)
- Larry Grooms, South Carolina state senator from the 37th district (1997–present) (switched to Nikki Haley after Scott withdrew)
- Penry Gustafson, South Carolina state senator from the 27th district (2021-2024)
- Bobby Harrell, speaker of the South Carolina House of Representatives (2005–2014) from the 114th district (1992–2014)
- Jenny Horne, South Carolina state representative from the 94th district (2009–2017)
- Jeff Johnson, South Carolina state representative from the 58th district (2014–present)
- Shane Massey, South Carolina Senate majority leader (2016–present) from the 25th district (2007–present) (switched to Nikki Haley after Scott withdrew)
- Jake McCalmon, Tennessee state representative from District 63 (2023–present)
- Brandon Newton, South Carolina state representative from the 45th district (2016–present)
- Weston Newton, South Carolina state representative from the 120th district (2013–present)
- Katrina Shealy, South Carolina state senator from the 23rd district (2013–2025) (switched to Nikki Haley after Scott withdrew)
- Mark Smith, South Carolina state representative from the 99th district (2020–present)
- Scott Talley, South Carolina state senator from the 12th district (2016–present)
- Bill Taylor, South Carolina state representative from the 86th district (2010–present) (switched endorsement to DeSantis after Scott withdrew)
- Ross Turner, South Carolina state senator from the 8th district (2012–present)

Mayors

- Robert Brown, mayor of Hampton, South Carolina (switched endorsement to DeSantis after Scott withdrew)
- Daniel Rickenmann, mayor of Columbia, South Carolina (2022–present)

Individuals

- Larry Ellison, co-founder and executive chairman of Oracle Corporation
- Keith Naughton, political consultant (co-endorsed with Ron DeSantis)
- Marc Rowan, co-founder and CEO of Apollo Global Management

== Declined to endorse ==
Declined to endorse

Former executive branch officials

- George W. Bush, 43rd president of the United States (2001–2009), governor of Texas (1995–2000)
- Mike Pence, 48th vice president of the United States (2017–2021), governor of Indiana (2013–2017), U.S. representative from Indiana (2001–2013); withdrawn candidate for president in 2024

U.S. senators

- Rand Paul, Kentucky (2011–present); candidate for president in 2016
- Mitt Romney, Utah (2019–2025); Republican nominee for president in 2012
- Todd Young, Indiana (2017–present)

U.S. representatives

- John Boehner, OH-08 (1991–2015); speaker of the House (2011–2015)
- Ken Buck, CO-04 (2015–2024)
- Tim Burchett, TN-02 (2019–present)
- Randy Feenstra, IA-04 (2021–present)
- Mike Gallagher, WI-8 (2017–2024)
- French Hill, AR-02 (2015–present)
- David Joyce, OH-14 (2013–present)
- Paul Ryan WI-1 (1999–2019), speaker of the House (2015–2019), 2012 Republican nominee for vice president
- David Schweikert, AZ-01 (2023–present), AZ-06 (2013–2021), AZ-05 (2011–2013)

Governors

- Jeb Bush, Florida (1999–2007); candidate for president in 2016
- Chris Christie, New Jersey (2010–2018); candidate for president in 2016; withdrawn candidate for president in 2024
- Eric Holcomb, Indiana (2017–2025); previously endorsed Mike Pence
- John Kasich, Ohio (2011–2019); U.S. representative from OH-12 (1983–2001); candidate for president in 2000 and 2016

Organizations

- Oklahoma Republican Party
- Republican Party of Arkansas

Individuals

- Erick Erickson, conservative talk radio host, blogger, and former Macon City Councilman from Ward 5 (2007–2011)

Labor unions

- United Mine Workers of America

State legislators

- Jessica de la Cruz, minority leader of the Rhode Island Senate (2022–present)

== Maps ==
=== National ===
Endorsements by incumbent Republicans in the U.S. Congress and in state offices nationwide before the withdrawal of Nikki Haley on March 6, 2024.

Endorsements by incumbent Republicans in the House of Representatives
Endorsed Donald Trump (162)
Endorsed Ron DeSantis (2) (withdrawn)
Endorsed Mike Pence (2) (withdrawn)
Endorsed Nikki Haley (1)
Endorsed Mike Pompeo (1) (declined to run)
No endorsement (44)
Declined to endorse a candidate (7)

Endorsements by incumbent Republicans in the U.S. Senate
Endorsed Donald Trump (33)
Endorsed Nikki Haley (2)
Endorsed Tim Scott (1) (withdrawn)
No endorsement (6)
Declined to endorse a candidate (7)

Endorsements by incumbent Republican governors
Endorsed Donald Trump (16)
Endorsed Nikki Haley (2)
Endorsed Ron DeSantis (1) (withdrawn)
Endorsed Mike Pence (1) (withdrawn)
No endorsement (5)
Declined to endorse a candidate (2)

=== State ===
Endorsements by incumbent Republicans in state legislatures in early primaries state before the primary in each state respectively happened.

==== Iowa ====
Endorsements by incumbent Republicans in the Iowa Senate
Endorsed Ron DeSantis (13)
Endorsed Donald Trump (8)
Endorsed Nikki Haley (1)
Endorsed Vivek Ramaswamy (1)
No endorsement (11)
Non-Republicans (16)

Endorsements by incumbent Republicans in the Iowa House of Representatives
Endorsed Ron DeSantis (27)
Endorsed Donald Trump (15)
Endorsed Nikki Haley (7)
Endorsed Vivek Ramaswamy (1)
No endorsement (14)
Non-Republicans (36)

==== New Hampshire ====
Endorsements by incumbent Republicans in the New Hampshire Senate Endorsed Ron DeSantis (1) (withdrawn) Endorsed Nikki Haley (1) Endorsed Donald Trump (1) No endorsement (11)

Endorsements by incumbent Republicans in the New Hampshire House of Representatives Endorsed Donald Trump (51) Endorsed Ron DeSantis (26) (withdrawn) Endorsed Vivek Ramaswamy (7) (withdrawn) Endorsed Nikki Haley (3) Endorsed Larry Elder (1) (withdrawn) No endorsement (110) Non-Republicans (202)

==== South Carolina ====
Endorsements by incumbent Republicans in the South Carolina House of Representatives Endorsed Donald Trump (61) Endorsed Ron DeSantis (4) (withdrawn) Endorsed Nikki Haley (4) Endorsed Tim Scott (2) (withdrawn) No endorsement (17) Non-Republicans (36)

Endorsements by incumbent Republicans in the South Carolina Senate Endorsed Donald Trump (7) Endorsed Nikki Haley (5) Endorsed Tim Scott (4) (withdrawn) Endorsed Ron DeSantis (1) (withdrawn) No endorsement (13) Non-Republicans (16)
