= Lee Bright =

American politician (born 1970)

- Bright in 2026

Member of the South Carolina Senate from the 12th district
- Incumbent
- Assumed office January 5, 2026
- Preceded by: Roger Nutt
- In office January 2009 – January 2017
- Preceded by: John D. Hawkins
- Succeeded by: Scott Talley

Personal details
- Born: March 21, 1970 (age 56) Greer, South Carolina, U.S.
- Party: Republican
- Spouse: Amy Bright
- Children: 2

Lee Bright (born March 21, 1970) is an American politician who serves as the South Carolina State Senator from the 12th district since 2026 and previously from 2009 to 2017. A member of the Republican Party, his district included Spartanburg County and Greenville County. Bright unsuccessfully ran for the U.S. Senate in 2014 and U.S. House of Representatives in 2018. He won a 2025 special election primary and reclaimed the 12th district State Senate seat.

== Early life, education and career ==
Lee Bright was raised in Pauline, South Carolina. Bright graduated from Dorman High School in 1988.

After serving as a trucking brokerage salesman for many years, Bright started his own trucking business, On Time, LLC. The company grew to employ over 100 people but was unable to recover after the Great Recession of 2008.

Bright has since been employed in a number of salesmen roles and in 2014 he started The Bright Agency, an independent insurance agency.

== Political career ==
=== Spartanburg School District ===
Bright was elected to the Spartanburg School District Six Board in 1999, and served on the board until his election to the South Carolina legislature. As a school board member, Bright called for teaching creationism in school science classes, explaining, "they're teaching evolution right now in school, and it's only a theory." In 2005, Bright was recognized with a "Friend of the Taxpayer" award from Citizens for Efficient Government.

=== South Carolina Senate ===
Bright contested the District 12 South Carolina Senate seat held by first-term incumbent John D. Hawkins in 2004, losing in a tight race by less than 50 votes. In 2008, Bright successfully challenged for the District 12 Senate seat. Hawkins chose not to seek reelection, leaving Bright to contest State Representative Scott Talley for the Republican nomination, which he ultimately won, along with the general election.

The 2012 election marked a replay of 2004 as Hawkins came out of retirement to challenge Bright in a campaign noted for its intensity. Governor Nikki Haley endorsed Bright over Hawkins, a move some claimed was in response to Hawkins's endorsement of Haley's 2010 election rival, Democrat Vincent Sheheen. Bright was, ultimately, handily reelected winning every precinct in his district and 65% of the primary vote. He went on to win the general election as well.

Bright lost his 2016 re-election bid in a primary runoff to former State Representative Talley. Haley reversed herself and endorsed Bright's opponent that year.

=== 2014 U.S. Senate campaign ===
Bright announced on August 13, 2013, that he would seek his party's nomination for United States Senate against incumbent Republican Lindsey Graham. Bright placed a distant second with 15.43% of the vote.

=== 2018 U.S. House campaign ===
Bright ran in the 2018 Republican primary to replace retiring Republican incumbent Trey Gowdy in South Carolina's 4th congressional district. He finished first in the June 12, 2018, primary with 25% of the vote, but two weeks later lost the primary runoff election to William Timmons on June 26, 2018.

=== 2024 State Senate campaign ===
In 2023, State Senate District 12 incumbent Scott Talley announced his retirement. Bright, South Carolina House of Representatives member Roger Nutt, businessman Skip Davenport, and former Spartanburg County Clerk of Court Hope Blackley faced each other in the Republican primary. Bright was bested by Representative Nutt in the Republican primary runoff, the latter defeated physician and Democratic nominee Octavia Amaechi in the general election.

=== 2025 Special election ===
With the resignation of Roger Nutt, Bright announced his intention to run for State Senate District 12. State Representative Bobby Cox and Hope Blackley also announced their intention to file. On August 29th, Cox suspended his campaign for the Senate seat. On October 22, Bright narrowly won the Republican Primary and with no Democratic opponent reclaimed the seat in December.

Bright said that he would resume membership in the House Republican Caucus, rather than joining the South Carolina Freedom Caucus.

== Political positions ==
=== Abortion ===
Bright has been a strong opponent of abortion and has been a sponsor of the "Life Begins at Conception Act" for three years. In April 2013, Bright introduced a bill attempting to "require doctors performing abortions to have board certification in obstetrics and gynecology. Doctors performing abortions in outpatient settings also would be required to have staff privileges at a local hospital." Pro-Choice proponents argued that the legislation would end all abortions in South Carolina and the bill was defeated in subcommittee.

=== Education ===
In May 2013, Bright was one of four senators who voted against a bill that would reduce government oversight of Clemson University.

=== Elections ===
In 2011 Bright cast the lone "no" vote in the South Carolina senate against a measure that would allow early voting, explaining "I think people ought to vote on Election Day." Along with Democrat Vincent Sheheen, Bright helped to write an ethics reform package that would require state legislators to wait eight years after leaving office before they could lobby their peers.

=== Endorsements ===
Bright backed Mark Sanford in his 2006 race for Governor of South Carolina. Bright described himself as troubled by the 2009 revelation that Sanford had flown to Argentina to meet with his mistress, but stopped short of joining calls for the governor's resignation.

In the 2012 Republican presidential primaries, Bright supported Michele Bachmann and was her South Carolina campaign chair. After Bachmann withdrew from the race, Bright switched his endorsement to Ron Paul.

=== Fiscal policy ===
In 2011, Bright introduced S.500 to study the solvency of money and the Federal Reserve. In advocating his proposal, Bright quipped "If at first you don't secede, try again."

Bright has also been an outspoken critic of government spending, and was designated as one of four "taxpayer heroes in the Senate" by the South Carolina chapter of the Club for Growth for the legislative session of 2011–2012. The Club for Growth is a PAC that describes themselves as "fiscally conservative" and has been opposed by Republicans Haley Barbour and Karl Rove. Bright also received the Friend of Taxpayer Award from the Spartanburg County Taxpayers Association. He had the highest rating of the Palmetto Liberty PAC on its legislative scorecard, and was unanimously endorsed by The Republican Liberty Caucus of South Carolina In 2012, after Governor Nikki Haley vetoed funding for a private organizations, teacher pay raises, and funding for the South Carolina Arts Commission, Bright voted to sustain the veto.

=== Gun control ===
In 2010 Bright sponsored legislation that would make any firearm produced in the state exempt from federal regulations, but the legislation stalled while being processed by committee. On December 13, 2012, Bright re-filed to reintroduce the legislation.

On January 19, 2013, Bright proposed legislation that would allow public schools to offer a class in firearms marksmanship.

Bright is the author of the Constitutional Carry Act of 2013 which would allow citizens to carry firearms without a permit. Bright was one of six senators to oppose the bi-partisan "Boland Bill", a bill that would make it easier for the state to track people found to be legally incompetent and make it more difficult for them to obtain a firearm.

=== Health policy ===
Bright has been an outspoken opponent of the Patient Protection and Affordable Care Act (ACA), the 2010 health care reform championed by President Barack Obama. In 2012, Bright sponsored a bill that would criminalize implementation of the Act, providing for penalties of up to two years for state officials who attempted to implement it and penalties of up to four years for federal officials who attempted to implement it. Bright involved the discredited legal theory of nullification in support of the legislation. Because the Supreme Court has upheld the constitutionality of the ACA, legal experts said the act would be unenforceable even if passed, due to the Supremacy Clause.

=== Transgender issues ===
In 2016 Lee Bright introduced a bill in the South Carolina Senate that would have prevented any municipality in the state from passing or maintaining transgender equality ordinances.

=== Refugee resettlement ===
The South Carolina Senate in 2016 considered a bill sponsored by Senator Bright that would require refugees in South Carolina to register with the South Carolina Law Enforcement Division. The bill would further hold non-profit resettlement agencies in the state financially liable for any crimes committed by a refugee that they assisted. While the bill's intent was focused on Syrian refugees, relief groups stated that no Syrian refugees have been resettled in South Carolina.

=== Confederate flag controversy ===
Members of the Senate, I heard our President sing a religious hymn and then Friday night I watched the White House be lit up in the abomination colors. It's time. We've got Amazing Grace, we've got people in the stands here of faith. It's time for the church to rise up. It's time for the state of South Carolina to rise up. Romans chapter one is clear. The Bible is clear. This country was founded on Judeo Christian principles and they are under assault by the men in black robes who were not elected by you. We better make a stand. What I'd like to see is these folks that are working in the position of dealing with these marriage certificates not to have to betray their faith or have to compromise their faith in order to subject themselves to the tyranny of five judges. What we need to do is to debate this on the floor.

Our governor called us in to deal with the flag that sits out front. Let's deal with the nation of sin that we face today. We talk about abortion but this gay marriage thing, I believe we will be one nation gone under. Like President Reagan said "If we're not one nation under God, we will be one nation gone under." And to sanctify deviant behavior from five judges. It's time for us to make our stand. It's time to make our stand and we're not doing it. We can rally together and talk about a flag all we want but the Devil is taking control of this land and we're not stopping him. It's time to make our stand. Let South Carolina discuss it. If the state's got to get out of the business of marriage then let's get out of the business of marriage because we cannot succumb to what's to come of the future of this nation.

Now I believe that Christ teaches us to love the homosexual but He also teaches us to stand in the gap against sin and we need to make our stand. I know how people feel, of all colors, about this. I know that we need to respect our brother and love our brother but we cannot respect this sin in the state of South Carolina so I'm asking you to open up the sine die and let's deal with marriage. If we're not going to find some way to push back against the Federal Government like our forefathers did or push back against a tyrannical government like the founders of this nation did, let's at least not put these citizens of South Carolina in a position where they've got to choose between their faith and their jobs.

— Lee Bright, July 6, 2015

On June 23, 2015, Bright was one of three Senate members including Tom Corbin (R-Greenville) and Danny Verdin (R-Laurens) who voted against removing the Confederate flag from the South Carolina State House grounds in the wake of the Charleston church shooting. The movement to remove the flag from the grounds had the support of Governor Nikki Haley, as well as from public figures in- and outside the state. The vote to debate the removal was approved 103 in favor and 10 opposed. Bright publicly compared the call to remove the flag to a "Stalinist purge". During debate on the flag on July 6, Bright said that the legislature should instead debate same-sex marriage after the Supreme Court of the United States ruling in the Obergefell v. Hodges.

Bright proposed an amendment to replace the battle flag with the first national flag of the Confederacy; it was tabled by the Senate until August 3. Bright believes that a majority of citizens in South Carolina would like the flag to remain, saying, "It means a lot of different things to a lot of different people but I believe the majority of South Carolinians would like to see it up, and I believe I speak for the majority of South Carolinians, so I would like to prove that with a vote." He continued his speech saying, "They are concerned that they are being painted with the same stroke as the murderer down in Charleston. They feel that they and their ancestors are being disparaged and that's not very fair." In his arguments against the flag's removal, he stated that the 20,000 soldiers from South Carolina who fought in the Civil War were being stripped of their honor by the flag's removal.

The bill to remove the flag passed the Senate on July 6, 2015. Early in the morning of July 9, the bill passed the South Carolina House of Representatives and was signed into law that afternoon by Governor Haley.

== Personal life ==
Bright is a member of Roebuck Baptist Church (Southern Baptist), Bright is a member of the Southeastern Baptist Theological Seminary's Board of Visitors. In 2013, he was re-nominated to a second four-year term on the board of trustees of the Southern Baptist Convention's Ethics and Religious Liberties Commission. Bright also served as a member of the Palmetto Family Council's Board of Directors, and the South Carolina Attorney General's Commission on the Family 2001 advisory board.
