= Mike Pence 2024 presidential campaign =

American political campaign

Mike Pence for President
- Campaign: 2024 U.S. presidential election; (2024 Republican primaries)
- Candidate: Mike Pence; 48th Vice President of the United States (2017–2021); 50th Governor of Indiana (2013–2017)
- Affiliation: Republican Party
- Status: Suspended
- Announced: June 7, 2023
- Suspended: October 28, 2023
- Receipts: US$5,109,978.51 (December 31, 2023)
- Slogan(s): I Like Mike; Too Honest; Rediscover America's Promise

Website
- mikepence2024.com (archived - Aug 23. 2023)

Mike Pence, the 48th vice president of the United States, briefly ran in the 2024 presidential election. The campaign was formally launched on June 5, 2023, when Pence filed paperwork to launch his entry into the election. He formally announced his candidacy two days later. He withdrew from the race three months later on October 28. Pence, a former governor of Indiana, had been tapped by Donald Trump to be the latter's running mate in the 2016 presidential election – Pence's first foray into executive national politics. During his time as vice president, Pence had chosen to align himself with the Christian right, advocating for evangelical values in his politics. Following the 2020 United States presidential election, when Pence refused to overturn the electoral votes in favor of Trump, Pence received enormous amounts of backlash from both Trump's advisors and supporters, culminating in the insurrection at the Capitol. Going into the 2024 election, Trump ruled out selecting Pence as his running mate, instead ultimately choosing Ohio senator JD Vance.

== Background ==
Speculation that Pence would run for president began during his tenure as vice president, including the possibility of Pence running in the 2020 election if Trump did not. In October 2021, polls of Republicans regarding their preferred presidential candidate in 2024 implied that Pence could begin a campaign as a top-tier candidate if former president Trump were to forgo a run. At the same time, this polling suggested a precipitous decline in Pence's polling numbers in the event that Trump were to seek to reclaim the White House. In light of this, there was a widespread view among both Republican leaders and grassroots Republicans that "Pence is dead in the early waters of 2024."

In May 2022, The New York Times reported that Pence was considering a presidential run regardless of whether Trump decided to run for a second term. Since leaving the vice presidency, Pence had distanced himself from Trump's attempts to cast doubt on the 2020 presidential election and made high-profile speeches in early nominating states. Pence also separated himself from Trump by endorsing candidates in several Republican primary elections in opposition to the candidate endorsed by Trump. In the primary for governor of Georgia, Pence endorsed incumbent governor Brian Kemp over the Trump-backed candidate, former senator David Perdue. This was described as "a proxy battle" between Pence and Trump, with Pence's candidate Kemp winning the nomination easily. In the 2022 Arizona gubernatorial election, Pence endorsed Karrin Taylor Robson while Trump endorsed Kari Lake. In the 2022 Wisconsin gubernatorial election Pence endorsed former Lieutenant Governor Rebecca Kleefisch; Trump supported businessman Tim Michels. In October 2022, Pence condemned "unprincipled populism" and "Putin apologists" in the Republican Party. In November, Pence sat down for a thirty-minute interview in New York City as part of a promotional tour for his book So Help Me God and was asked whether he would support Trump in his recently announced 2024 campaign: "I think we’ll have better choices." In December, Pence was reported to have filed paperwork to run for president in the 2024 United States presidential election against Trump in the 2024 Republican Party presidential primaries. It was later reported that the filing did not occur.

In 2023, Pence criticized Trump, especially regarding the events that took place on January 6, 2021, which threatened Pence's safety. While speaking at a Gridiron dinner in March, an event attended by politicians and journalists, Pence said that Trump was wrong to suggest that he had a right to overturn the election results. Pence went further, saying that Trump's words not only endangered him, but his family and everyone at the Capitol. Much of the rhetoric was believed to be a lead-up to Pence's potential run for the Republican nomination heading into the 2024 election. In April, during an appearance on Fox & Friends, Pence said the hosts would "have a clear idea of what the Pences decide in weeks and not months" and that it was still "real early" in the primary when asked if he was taking too long to announce.

== Campaign ==
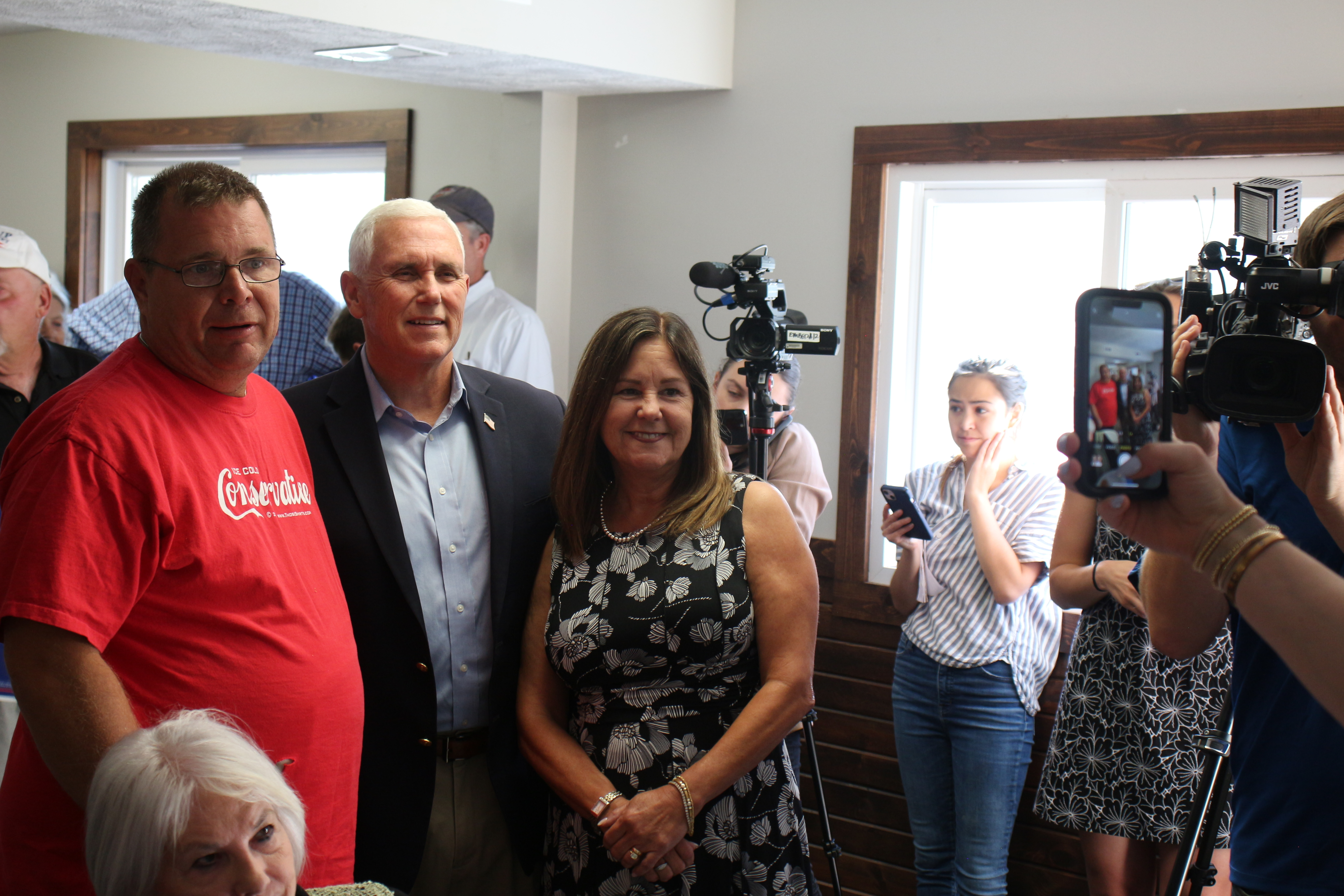
Mike and Karen Pence at a Pottawattamie County GOP event on July 6, 2023

On June 5, 2023, Pence filed paperwork with the Federal Election Commission (FEC), officially becoming a candidate. He announced his candidacy two days later on his 64th birthday.

On June 29, Pence visited Ukraine to meet President Volodymyr Zelenskyy. Pence, who became the first 2024 Republican presidential candidate to visit the country, said, "We need to make sure that we provide the Ukrainian military what they need to push back on and defeat Russian aggression here."

On July 26, Pence unveiled his economic plan to reduce high inflation and save the US $1.2 trillion. In a statement, Pence charged President Biden with being "set on dismantling our once great economy and hurting families who can no longer afford food or find a good paying job" and said the top economic priority of a Pence administration "will be to renew American prosperity by cutting wasteful government spending, restoring the value of the dollar, building resilient supply chains, and restoring American energy independence."

On August 9, Pence posted a campaign ad on Twitter where he grabbed a gas-pump nozzle and criticized Biden's "war on energy" before condemning surging energy prices and stating his plan for lower consumer costs that would restore the US "as the leading producer of energy in the world" by 2040. Due to Pence not selecting the fuel grade, and the pump making a noise as he spoke, he was "roundly mocked on social media from both the left and Trump-loyalist right".

On September 6, Pence delivered an address at the New Hampshire Institute of Politics at Saint Anselm College. The speech's title, "Populism vs. Conservatism: Republicans’ Time for Choosing", was a reference to the 1964 "A Time for Choosing" speech by Ronald Reagan. Pence warned "the Republican Party as we have long known it will cease to exist" if the "new populism of the right" controlled it and that GOP primary voters had the choice to "determine both the fate of our party and the course of our nation for years to come." Philip Elliot of Time opined that Pence painted "Trump as a populist on par with the likes of Howard Dean or Bobby Kennedy" and that while Pence may not win the nomination, "his goal may be more important, more idealized: to remind Republicans that there was an era before the populist, Trumpian bullhorn; there once was a mild-mannered man from the Midwest (Reagan from Illinois, Pence from Indiana) who remade the GOP in his conservative image. The party may yet survive." Trump advisor Jason Miller responded to the speech by claiming that Trump's 2016 victory "exposed the massive divide" between voters and "the establishment Beltway insiders who made terrible trade deals, allowed our southern border to become overrun and never missed an opportunity to play world cop."

In October, Pence spoke at Georgetown University in the first in a series of conversations with presidential candidates hosted by the Associated Press and the Georgetown Institute of Politics and Public Service. Pence stated that China would be inspired to invade Taiwan if Russia overran Ukraine and warned that "if we don’t check the efforts by authoritarian regimes to redraw international lines by force, the rest of the 21st century could look a lot like the first half of the 20th century."

== Fundraising ==
In July 2023, a Pence campaign advisor revealed the campaign had raised US$3.85 million in the second quarter of 2023, with Politico noting that "Pence’s haul pales in comparison to the fundraising totals released by many of his Republican rivals, especially given Pence’s previous two appearances on a presidential ticket and access to donors." Starting in August, Pence sold t-shirts and hats that read “Too honest," referencing a January 2021 phone call between Pence and Trump in which the latter called the then-vice president "too honest" after Pence said there was no constitutional basis to reject votes in the 2020 election. On August 7, the Pence campaign announced it had reached the donor threshold to qualify for the first Republican debate, having relied on direct mail and requesting just $1 to meet 40,000 unique donors requirement. Shortly after the first Republican primary debate, Pence raised US$250,000 at a fundraiser hosted by Forrest Lucas in one of the largest single day fundraising hauls since his campaign began. Campaign manager Steve DeMaura released a memo indicating that the Pence campaign's strategy did "not take $150 million today" nor "involve trying to be a Trump clone or single-mindedly running to repudiate him." Pence raised $3.3 million during the third quarter and accrued $620,000 in debt, Pence himself giving the campaign $150,000 from his personal funds. The numbers lagged behind the $45 million, $15 million, and $11 million raised by the Trump, DeSantis, and Haley campaigns in the same period.

== Relationship with Donald Trump ==
Pence is the first vice president to run against the president they served under since John Nance Garner competed with President Franklin D. Roosevelt in 1940. Before Trump entered the race, he told Brian Kilmeade that Pence and other cabinet members would be "very disloyal" to run against him if he mounted a bid, his comments coming as Pence, Nikki Haley, and Mike Pompeo were reportedly considering entering the 2024 race. Following Trump's indictment in the 2020 election case, Pence would not say whether he planned to vote for Trump in the 2024 general election should Trump win the Republican nomination. In an interview with Linsey Davis, Pence stated his intent to take "my record to the American people, and the president can continue to do what he does: He can continue to hold forth and level his broadside", declining "to engage in negative personal attacks." Pence told reporters that Trump and other candidates were "trying to marginalize the cause of life". Pence furthered that Trump's refusal to endorse a 15-week national law banning or limiting abortion and his blaming the overturning of Roe v. Wade as the reason Republicans underperformed in the 2022 midterm elections "sends a signal to pro-life Americans about the priority he’ll put on the cause of life should you return him to the White House."

== Presidential debates ==
Pence was one of eight candidates who appeared at the first Republican presidential debate on August 23, 2023. When asked what his strategy for the debate would be, Pence said he would be himself and that he felt "like I’ve been preparing for this first Republican presidential debate my whole life." The Hill declared Pence, Chris Christie, and Nikki Haley the winners, furthering that Pence delivered "a number of forceful interventions" as he demonstrated fierceness and had seen "the best night of his campaign to date." BBC News declared Pence the second-place winner, behind Vivek Ramaswamy, and ahead of Haley. The Washington Post declared Trump (who did not appear), Ramaswamy, and Pence the debate's winners. The reporters of Politico had mixed responses, variously citing Pence, Ramaswamy, and Ron DeSantis as the winners. After the debate, in a post on Truth Social, Trump claimed that he "never asked Mike Pence to put me above the Constitution. Who would say such a thing? A FAKE STORY!"

Pence appeared alongside six competitors at the second Republican presidential debate on September 27. All competitors from the first debate returned, except Hutchinson who failed to qualify. After Trump announced he would skip the second GOP debate, Pence called it "a missed opportunity" for both Trump and Republican voters and said "the former president – just like all the rest of us vying for the Republican nomination – owe it to the American people to express what our agenda will be for turning this country around." USA Today called Pence's comment about "sleeping with a teacher for 38 years" as "one of the most memorable one-liners of the debate". The Hill noted Pence as one of the debate's losers, along with Ramaswamy and Burgum. Politico mentioned the decline of Pence's performance from the first debate, asserting that he "didn’t do enough to highlight his bona fides as a religious conservative leader, which should be one of his selling points to the Republican Party." The Washington Post, citing Pence's pivoting from answering if he wanted to repeal the Affordable Care Act, declared the health care law as one of the debate's winners. Opinion writers and contributors of The New York Times gave Pence the lowest score of any candidate at 2.4 with Daniel McCarthy arguing that Pence did not say anything that "made an effective case for him over any of his competitors, who seem fresher and more energetic than he does." FiveThirtyEight polled Republican voters on who performed the best and worst of the debate, with 24% responding that Chris Christie had the worst performance, while 20% chose Pence.

== Withdrawal ==
Pence withdrew from the race in a surprise announcement on October 28 at a meeting of the Republican Jewish Coalition in Las Vegas. Regarding his campaign, Pence stated "It's become clear to me: This is not my time." Many of his primary opponents, (including Asa Hutchinson, Tim Scott, Ron DeSantis, Nikki Haley, Doug Burgum and Chris Christie) wished him well.

Pence became the first former Vice President since Dan Quayle in 2000 to fail in a bid to receive their party's nomination.

Pence got 404 votes during the whole 2024 Republican Party presidential primaries.

== Endorsements ==
Mike Pence endorsements

Federal officials

- Dan Coats, director of National Intelligence (2017–2019), United States senator from Indiana (1989–1999, 2011–2017)
- T. Kenneth Cribb Jr., director of the Domestic Policy Council (1987)
- Helene von Damm, United States Ambassador to Austria (1983–1986)
- Donald P. Hodel, Secretary of the Interior (1985–1989), Secretary of Energy (1982–1985)
- Larry Kudlow, director of the National Economic Council (2018–2021)
- Marc Short, Chief of Staff to the Vice President (2019–2021)
- Paul Teller, Special Assistant to the President for Legislative Affairs (2017–2020)
- Marc Thiessen, White House Director of Speechwriting (2007–2009)

Governors

- Eric Holcomb, governor of Indiana (2017–2025)

U.S. representatives

- Larry Bucshon, U.S. representative from IN-08 (2011–2025)
- Jeb Hensarling, U.S. representative from TX-05 (2003–2019)
- Peter King, U.S. representative from NY-02 (2013–2021) and NY-03 (1993–2013)
- Greg Pence, U.S. representative from IN-06 (2019–2025) (Pence’s brother)

State executive officials

- Art Pope, budget director of North Carolina (2013–2014); Republican nominee for lieutenant governor of North Carolina in 1992
- Victor Smith, Indiana Secretary of Commerce (2013–2017)

State legislators

- Robert Clegg Jr., New Hampshire senator from the 14th district (2002–2008)
- Todd Huston, speaker of the Indiana House of Representatives (2020–present) from the 37th district (2012–present)
- Michael Murphy, Indiana state representative from the 90th district (1994–2010)

Party officials

- Jeff Cardwell, Indiana Republican Party chair (2015–2017)
- Chip Saltsman, Tennessee Republican Party chair (1999–2001)

Individuals

- Charlotte Bond, writer (Pence's daughter)
- Jack Butler, National Review Online submission editor
- Ron Cameron, owner and chairman of Mountaire Farms (switched to Nikki Haley after Pence withdrew)
- Marjorie Dannenfelser, president of the Susan B. Anthony Pro-Life America
- Edwin Feulner, co-founder of The Heritage Foundation
- Adrie Groeneweg, president and founder of Pizza Ranch
- Quin Hillyer, conservative newspaper columnist and writer
- Jonathan V. Last, editor of The Bulwark
- Rich Lowry, editor-in-chief of National Review
- Forrest Lucas, founder of Lucas Oil
- Karen Pence, teacher and Second Lady of the United States (2017–2021) (Pence's wife)
- Roger Penske, auto racing team owner
- Tony Perkins, president of the Family Research Council (2003-present)
- Scott Reed, campaign manager of the 1996 Bob Dole presidential campaign
- David A. Ricks, president of Eli Lilly and Company
- Joel C. Rosenberg, author
- Warren Stephens, businessman
- Cal Thomas, conservative newspaper columnist and writer
