= Michael Forrester =

Michael Forrester may refer to:

- Michael Forrester (British Army officer)
- Michael Forrester (politician)
