= Tommy Paradise =

American politician

Member of the South Carolina House of Representatives from the 86th district
- Incumbent
- Assumed office November 9, 2026
- Preceded by: Bill Taylor

Personal details
- Party: Republican
- Website: Campaign website

Tommy Paradise is an American politician. A member of the Republican Party, he is the member for the 86th district of the South Carolina House of Representatives. He was elected at the 2026 election. He succeeded Republican Bill Taylor.
