= John D. Hawkins =

American lawyer

Member of the South Carolina Senate from the 12th district
- In office 2000–2008
- Preceded by: John R. Russell
- Succeeded by: Lee Bright

Member of the South Carolina House of Representatives from the 12th district
- In office 1996–2000
- Preceded by: Carole Wells
- Succeeded by: Scott Talley

Personal details
- Born: March 2, 1968 (age 58) Spartanburg, South Carolina
- Party: Republican
- Spouse: Tammie Hoy Hawkins
- Profession: Attorney

John David Hawkins is a trial lawyer from Spartanburg, South Carolina. He is the owner and managing attorney of the Hawkins Law Firm.

From 1996 through 2000 he served in the South Carolina House of Representatives. He served as chairman of the Legislative Freshman Caucus.

In 2000 he was elected a Republican member of the South Carolina Senate, representing the 12th district. In 2004 he narrowly won reelection defeating his primary challenger, Lee Bright by 31 votes. In 2008 Hawkins did not run for reelection.

In 2012, Hawkins challenged Lee Bright in the Republican primary for district 12, but was defeated.

While serving in the senate, Hawkins was a leading proponent of South Carolina Amendment 1, prohibiting same-sex marriage, which was passed in a statewide referendum in 2006. On September 18, 2013, Hawkins renounced this anti-gay legislation and announced, "I was wrong about pursing [sic] the marriage amendment. I wish I hadn't been so strident against it." Formerly a Republican, he now considers himself a progressive independent.
