= Edward Southard =

American politician

Member of the South Carolina House of Representatives from the 100th district
- In office 2010 – January 10, 2017
- Succeeded by: Sylleste Davis

Personal details
- Born: October 1, 1946 (age 79) Cornelia, Georgia, United States
- Party: Republican

Edward Southard (born October 1, 1946) is an American politician. He is a former member of the South Carolina House of Representatives from the 100th District, serving from 2010 until 2017. He is a member of the Republican party.
