= Bobby Cox (politician) =

American politician (born 1980)

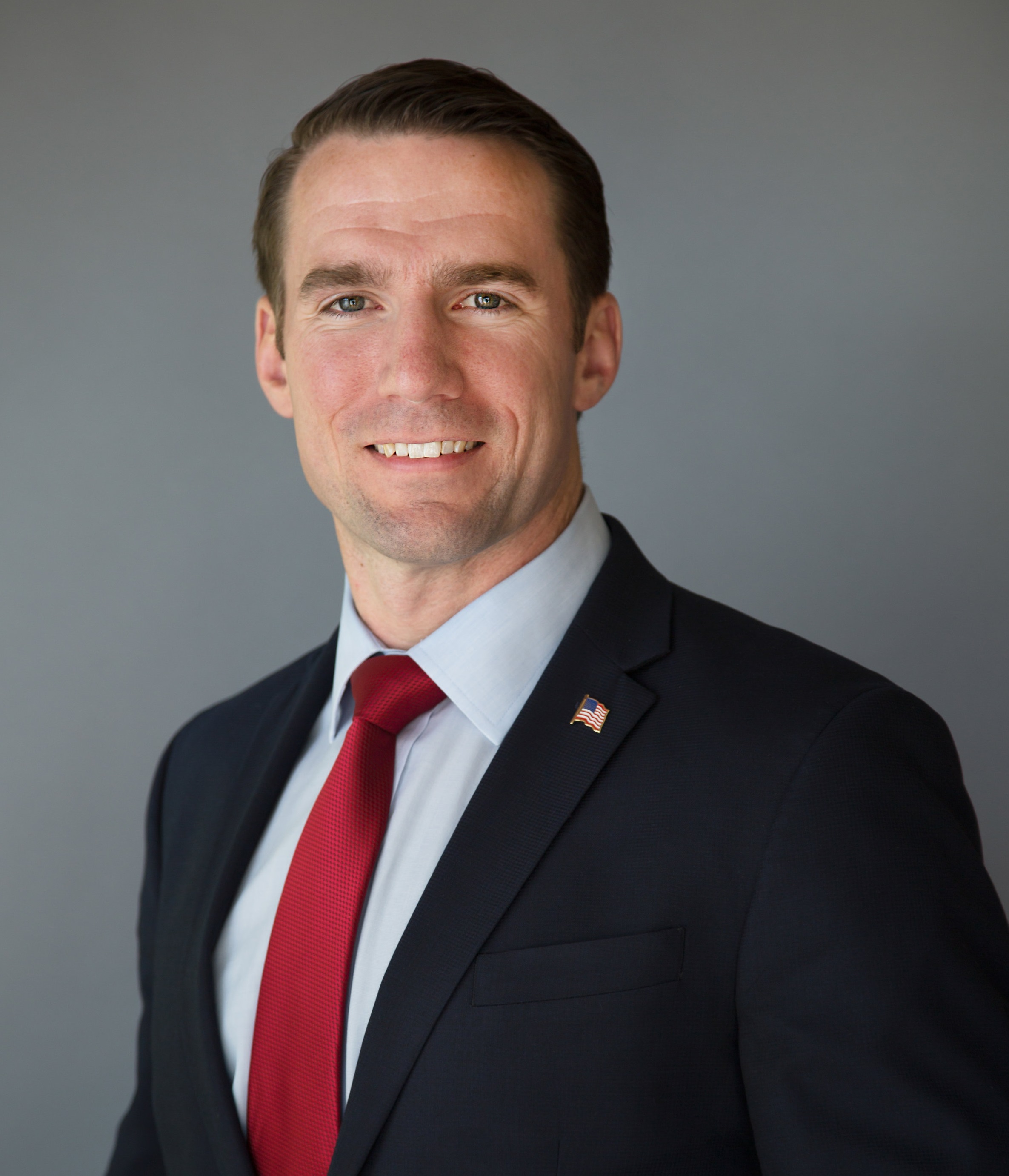

Member of the South Carolina House of Representatives from the 21st district
- In office November 12, 2018 – January 2026
- Preceded by: Phyllis Henderson
- Succeeded by: Dianne Mitchell

Personal details
- Born: February 10, 1980 (age 46) Spartanburg, South Carolina, U.S.
- Party: Republican
- Spouse: Joscelyn
- Children: 2
- Education: The Citadel (BA); University of North Carolina at Chapel Hill (MBA); George Washington University (MPS)
- Profession: Businessman, State Representative
- Website: campaign website

Military service
- Allegiance: United States
- Branch/service: United States Army
- Years of service: 2002–2025
- Rank: Lieutenant Colonel
- Unit: 82nd Airborne Division; 75th Ranger Regiment
- Battles/wars: Iraq War
- Awards: Bronze Star; Meritorious Service Medal (3); Army Commendation Medal (4); Achievement Medal (4); Military Outstanding Volunteer Service Medal

Bobby J. Cox (born February 10, 1980) is a retired Lieutenant Colonel in the United States Army Reserve and a former member of the South Carolina House of Representatives where he represented the 21st District from 2018 to 2026. He is a member of the Republican Party and a former Army Ranger.

== Early life, education and military career ==
Cox was born in Spartanburg, South Carolina, and graduated from The Citadel, The Military College of South Carolina; as a senior he served as Regimental Commander, the highest-ranking member of the South Carolina Corps of Cadets. He holds a Master of Business Administration from the University of North Carolina at Chapel Hill Kenan-Flagler Business School with a distinction in Leadership and a Master of Professional Studies in Legislative Affairs from George Washington University.

Following the 9/11 Terrorist attacks, Cox joined the U.S. Army. As an Army Ranger, Cox served four combat tours in the Middle East with elite units as the 101st Airborne Division (Air Assault), 75th Ranger Regiment, and the 82nd Airborne Division. He was awarded the Bronze Star Medal, three Meritorious Service Medals, four Army Commendation Medals, four Army Achievement Medals, and the Military Outstanding Volunteer Service Medal. He also served as an instructor at the U.S. Army Ranger School and was selected to serve as a U.S. Army Congressional Fellow. Cox retired from the Army Reserve as a Lieutenant Colonel in December 2025.

Cox was employed at Milliken & Company in Spartanburg.

== Political career ==
Cox successfully ran for SC House District 21 in 2018. He was elected to lead the freshman caucus.

Cox was a member of the South Carolina House of Representatives where he represented the 21st District 2019 to 2025. Cox was Vice Chair of the House Medical, Military, Public and Municipal Affairs Committee and Chairman of the Military and Veterans Affairs Sub-Committee. On August 11, 2025, he resigned his seat in the House to run for the South Carolina Senate seat vacated by incumbent Roger Nutt.

Cox served on the South Carolina leadership team for the Trump Vance 2025 Presidential Campaign.

Cox is currently employed by SIG SAUER as their Vice President of Government Affairs, where he oversees strategic program development for Capitol Hill, The Pentagon, State Department, and Federal Law Enforcement Agencies.

On December 10, 2019, Cox was nominated by South Carolina Governor Henry McMaster to be the state's first Secretary of Veterans Affairs. Cox removed his name from consideration after the discovery that holding a Secretary position while in elected office is a violation of State law.

=== Special election ===
In August 2025 Cox announced his resignation from the South Carolina House, effective in January 2026, in order to run for the seat of resigning senator Roger Nutt. The special election is scheduled for December 23, 2025, with primaries on October 21. On August 29, 2025, Cox suspended his campaign for the State Senate seat, citing business obligations.

The four candidates filed to run for the SC House District 21 seat: Reggy Batson, small business owner and former firefighter; Dianne Mitchell, past president, Greenville Republican Women's Club and former teacher; Steve Nail, Dean of Anderson University’s College of Business, and Jack Stott, Chairman, Upstate Young Republicans. Nail and Mitchell faced each other in the Republican Primary runoff, with Mitchell emerging the winner. With no Democrat in the race, Mitchell won the seat in December.

== Personal life ==
Bobby is married to Joscelyn Cox and they have two children and a Boykin Spaniel.
