= Lansing Trade Group, LLC =

American agriculture trading company

- Company type: Private (before ceasing - January 2019)
- Industry: Commodities
- Founded: 1922
- Headquarters: Overland Park, Kansas, United States
- Area served: North America, Asia, South America
- Key people: Bill Krueger (CEO); Mark O'Donnell (CFO)
- Products: Grains, commodities trading, ethanol
- Revenue: ▼US$ 4.81 billion (FY 2017)
- Net income: ▼US$ 12 million (FY 2017)
- Total assets: ▼US$ 1.01 billion (FY 2015)
- Number of employees: +500
- Divisions: Lansing Trade Group; Lansing Ethanol Services; Lansing Vermont; Lansing Canada; Lansing Louisiana; Feed Factors Limited
- Website: www.lansingtradegroup.com

Lansing Trade Group, LLC (abbreviated as LTG) was one of the largest independently owned physical trading companies in North America, dealing in grain and energy products, at one point approaching $10 billion in annual revenue. On January 2, 2019, The Andersons announced that it had completed its acquisition of LTG. LTG ceased to exist on that date and its operations now operate entirely as The Andersons. The company had 15 offices in North America and offices in London, Germany, Brazil, China, and Singapore. LTG was originally established as Lansing Grain Company in 1931. The company was largely owned by employees, two public entities, The Andersons (32%) and Macquarie Group, and by New Hope Liuhe Co. Ltd (20%), one of the largest meat processors in China. LTG was one of America’s Largest Private Companies according to Forbes.

== Investors ==
In 2003, The Andersons became a minority investor in LTG and by 2008 The Andersons made additional investments to secure an ownership interest of 49%. During January 2014, The Andersons announced that it would reduce its investment in LTG to approximately 39% during the first quarter of 2014. The Andersons has since further reduced its investment in LTG to approximately 32%.

Through its subsidiary, Macquarie Bank, Macquarie Group became an investor in LTG through an investment into Lansing Ethanol Services, LLC (abbreviated as LES), an ethanol trading company created by LTG. Macquarie Bank has since sold its investment in LES and now is a direct investor of LTG.

On December 8, 2015, Lansing Trade Group, LLC sold equity to New Hope Liuhe Investment (USA), Inc., a U.S. subsidiary of Chinese company, New Hope Liuhe Co. Ltd. New Hope paid $127,500,000 in cash for a 20% equity interest in Lansing.

On January 28, 2014, Moody’s Investors Service assigned a B1 rating to LTG and a B3 rating to its proposed $175 million senior unsecured notes due 2021.

== Notable events ==
In 2010, LTG formed a natural gas liquids trading group under the name of Lansing NGL Services, expanding its energy business beyond ethanol and bio-diesel.

In 2011, LTG announced that it will acquire the remaining interest of Ackerman Beardsley Bennett, the largest privately owned feed ingredient trader in the northeast US. The acquired company will be renamed Lansing Vermont, Inc.

In 2013, LTG along with The Andersons purchased Thompsons Limited, a grain and food-grade bean handler headquartered in Blenheim, Ontario, Canada with approximately 12 locations across Ontario and Minnesota. Each company owns 50% of the acquired company, which was purchased for $152 million in cash, business contributions, and external debt. The transaction closed on July 1, 2013. Thompsons Limited will continue operations under its current name and will continue to operate independently.

LTG began investing, operating and marketing in the frac sand space in 2013. The company purchased several sites in Texas and Minnesota and has since become a significant frac sand distributor in North America.

In 2014, LTG purchased Feed Factors Limited, a trading company based in London, that focuses on domestic and international distribution of agricultural commodities for human and animal consumption.

In March 2016, LTG increased its ownership interest to 38% of Providence Grain Group, a western Canada grain handler. LTG initially became a minority investor in Providence Grain in 2014. As part of the deal, Providence Grain purchased the assets of LTG's Canadian trading business unit, Lansing Canada, ULC.

During 2016, LTG hired the former employees of the agriculture trading unit of Vitol. This was shortly after Vitol decided to make steps to focus on its core business, which involved shedding it agriculture unit. LTG expanded its international presence with the move, including opening offices in Germany, Vancouver, and Singapore, and hiring Vitol's former Global Head of Agriculture.

In June 2017, LTG announced that it would acquire U.S. competitor, Interstate Commodities, Inc. LTG will purchase substantially all the trading units of Interstate. LTG will not acquire Interstate's railcar business, facilities and certain other business units.

During July 2018, the Commodity Futures Trading Commission and the Chicago Mercantile Exchange each announced separate fines against LTG of over $6.5 million combined for knowingly disseminating false information concerning market conditions and subsequently manipulating exchange futures and options contracts. The charges also included the failure of company executives to prevent the actions taken by the company. The CME reported that this was the largest fine given since the CME's consolidation in 2007.

On October 15, 2018, The Andersons announced that it would acquire 100% of LTG by purchasing the remaining 67.5% interest in the company for $305 million (a valuation of $450 million). That interest was previously owned by New Hope, Macquarie Bank and Employees. The transaction was expected to close by no later than January 2019. Expectations were that LTG's operations would be fully integrated into The Andersons at the time the deal closes, and that integrating LTG's operations into The Andersons will reduce overhead and other costs by up to $10 million annually. LTG's headquarters in Overland Park, Kansas was expected to retain its trading operations and risk management function.

== Publications ==
LTG was the 34th largest exporter in the US by container and the 5th largest agricultural exporter according to The Journal of Commerce.

LTG was ranked #68 on Forbes’ 2016 list of America’s Largest Private Companies, with revenue of $5.6 billion for its 2015 fiscal year and over 500 full-time employees.
