= Bill Taylor (South Carolina politician) =

American Politician from South Carolina

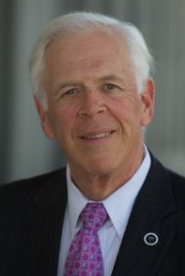

Member of the South Carolina House of Representatives from the 86th district
- In office November 8, 2010 – November 9, 2026
- Preceded by: James Stewart Jr.
- Succeeded by: Tommy Paradise

Personal details
- Born: Bill Taylor; July 16, 1946 (age 80) Aurora, Illinois, U.S.
- Party: Republican
- Spouse: Donna Taylor
- Children: Kasey Taylor Lenz, Ryan Taylor
- Education: Bradley University (B.J.)

Bill Taylor (born July 16, 1946) is an American politician. He is a member of the South Carolina House of Representatives from the 86th District, serving since November 8, 2010. He is a member of the Republican party. The 86th district covers nearly two-thirds of Aiken County, South Carolina consists of a population more than 42,000. He also represents portions of Lexington County. Taylor currently is a member of the House Ways & Means Committee. He is also a member of the House Regulations & Artificial Intelligence Committee, Previously, he served for a decade on the House Education and Public Works Committee, and six years on the Legislative Oversight Committee. He also served on the House Labor, Comerece & Industry Committee for one term.

== Pre-Political Career ==
Bill Taylor worked in the field of journalism for more than four decades. From 1965 to 1976, Taylor's job varied from being a reporter, news presenter, and news director, in which he would also serve as President of the Illinois News Broadcasters Association, in 1974. Bill would proceed to work as a news consultant for more than 3 decades, in which he would also be the founder and CEO of a media research and consulting firm based in Dallas, Los Angeles, and London, from 1978 to 2007. Most notably, prior to his career in the South Carolina House of Representatives, Bill Taylor would become a consultant to George H. W. Bush from 1991 to 1992, advising the White House on the Points of Light initiative.

== Political career ==
In August 2009, Bill Taylor attended the Leadership Institute's Future Candidate School, located in Arlington, Virginia, where Bill would gain essential, political knowledge. Bill later credited the institution, following his election to the South Carolina House of Representatives, saying "My campaign success was fueled by our enrolling in LI’s Future Candidate’s School; it was a most valuable experience. It’s essential to be as knowledgeable as possible and prepared for the twists and turns of a political campaign. LI smoothed our political road to success." Bill ran for the Republican nomination for the 86th district in the South Carolina House of Representatives, following the announcement of his candidacy, January 2010. On June 8, Taylor won the nomination, beating incumbent, James Stewart Jr., who was seeking his fifth term. Taylor won the election in the safe, Republican district, and currently still holds the seat. Throughout his time in office, Bill's most significant positions included Chairman of the Higher Education Sub-Committee (State House Education & Public Works Committee), from 2015 to present, and Majority Caucus Whip from 2013 to 2016.

He was succeeded by Republican Tommy Paradise at the 2026 election.

== Electoral history ==
=== 2010 ===
South Carolina State House of Representatives District 86 Republican Primary 2010
Party	Candidate	Votes	%
Republican	Bill Taylor	2,428	57.36%
Republican	James Stewart Jr. (incumbent)	1,805	42.64%
Total votes		4,233	100.0%

South Carolina State House of Representatives District 86 General Election 2010
Party	Candidate	Votes	%
Republican	Bill Taylor	9,007	97.82%
Write-in	Write-in	201	2.18%
Total votes		9,208	100.0%

=== 2012 ===
South Carolina State House of Representatives District 86 General Election 2012
Party	Candidate	Votes	%
Republican	Bill Taylor	10,931	96.45%
Write-in	Write-in	402	3.55%
Total votes		11,333	100.0%

=== 2014 ===
South Carolina State House of Representatives District 86 General Election 2014
Party	Candidate	Votes	%
Republican	Bill Taylor	7,534	98.57%
Write-in	Write-in	109	1.43%
Total votes		7,643	100.0%

=== 2016 ===
South Carolina State House of Representatives District 86 General Election 2016
Party	Candidate	Votes	%
Republican	Bill Taylor	12,312	98.78%
Write-in	Write-in	152	1.22%
Total votes		12,464	100.0%

=== 2018 ===
South Carolina State House of Representatives District 86 General Election 2018
Party	Candidate	Votes	%
Republican	Bill Taylor	9,703	97.75%
Write-in	Write-in	223	2.25%
Total votes		9,926	100.0%
