= Liston Barfield =

American politician

Member of the South Carolina House of Representatives from the 58th district
- In office 1997–2014

Personal details
- Born: August 9, 1945 (age 81) Conway, South Carolina, United States
- Party: Republican

Liston Douglas Barfield (born August 9, 1945) is an American politician. He is a member of the South Carolina House of Representatives from the 58th District, serving since 2001. He is a member of the Republican party. He also served from 1985 to 1989.

In 2023, he endorsed Tim Scott's presidential campaign.
