= Mountaire Farms =

Poultry production company

- Industry: Manufacturing
- Founded: 1914
- Headquarters: Millsboro, Delaware, United States
- Key people: Ron Cameron (President and CEO)
- Products: Chicken
- Website: mountaire.com

Mountaire Farms is the fourth-largest producer of chicken in the United States, with headquarters in Millsboro, Delaware. The company operates internationally, serving the United States and foreign markets as far away as Asia. Mountaire Farms has facilities in the states of Arkansas, Delaware, Maryland, North Carolina, and Virginia. The company has about 7,000 employees and plays a major part in the economy of Delaware.

== History ==
What became Mountaire Farms was founded in Arkansas in 1914 by Guy Cameron, who started a local feed business. His son Ted Cameron built four feed mills in the 1950s to serve local growers. In 1959, the company started processing chickens, with Mountaire Poultry, Inc. incorporated in 1964. The company was incorporated as Mountaire Corporation in 1971. Ron Cameron, the son of Ted Cameron, became president and CEO of the company in 1975.

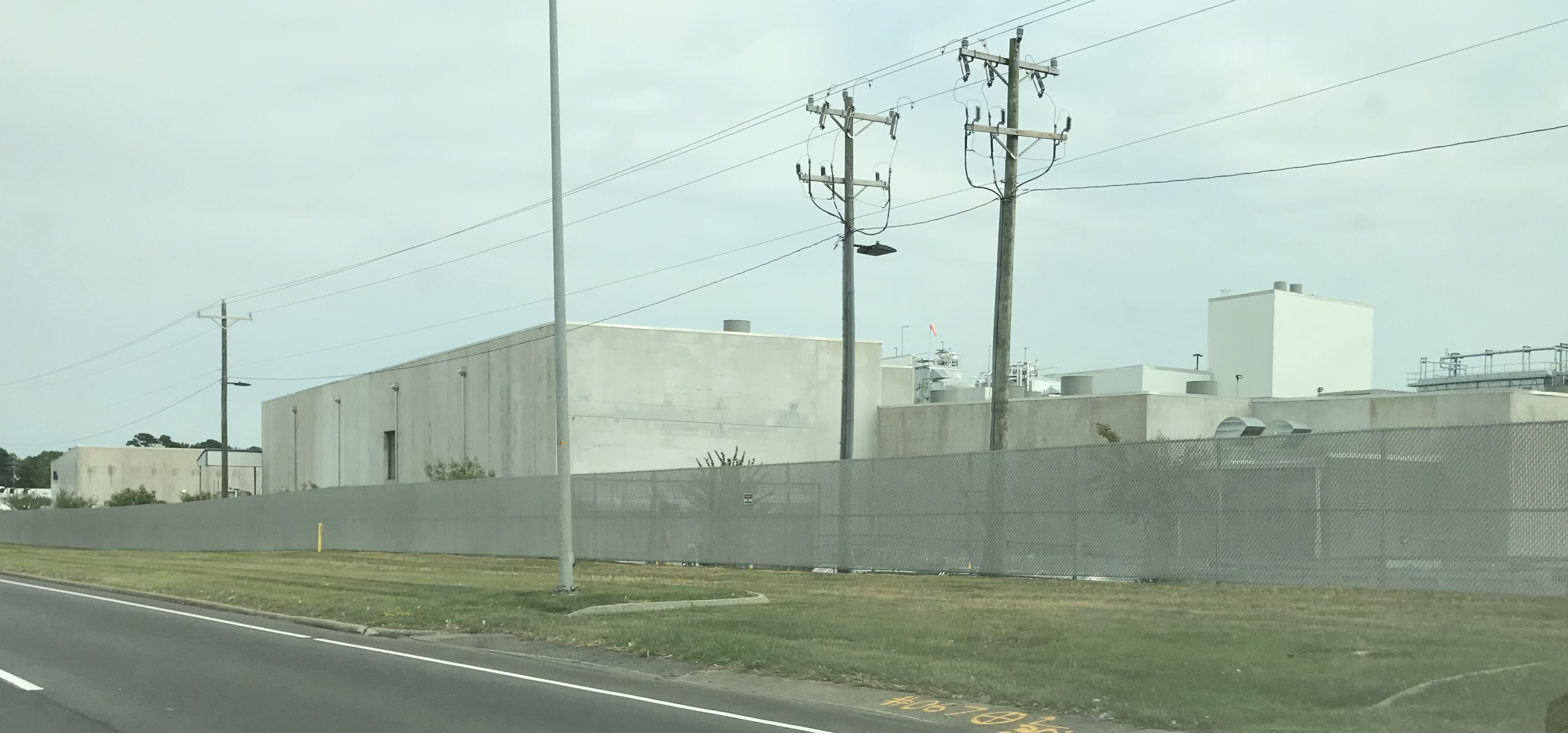
Mountaire Farms facility in Siler City, North Carolina

In 1977, Mountaire Farms expanded operations to Delaware when it purchased H&H Poultry in Selbyville. The company acquired Piedmont Poultry in Lumber Bridge, North Carolina in 1996. In 2000, Mountaire Farms purchased operations from Townsends, including Central Grain Facilities, in Millsboro, Delaware. The same year, the company built a new feed mill in Candor, North Carolina. In 2003, Mountaire Farms bought the Tyson feed mill in Princess Anne, Maryland. The company acquired operations from Hostetter Grain Facilities in Trappe, Maryland, Queen Anne, Maryland, and Seaford, Delaware in 2007. In 2009, Mountaire Farms bought Mauney Grain in New London, North Carolina. The company acquired Carmean Grain Facilities in Ridgely, Maryland in 2011. In 2012, Mountaire Farms bought Gavilon Grain in Townsend, Delaware. The company took over the Townsend/Omtron Hatchery in Siler City, North Carolina in 2013. Mountaire Farms bought Star Milling in Statesville, North Carolina in 2014, which became their Breeder Feed Mill. In 2016, the company bought a former processing plant in Siler City, with plans to renovate and update the plant. In October of that year, Mountaire Farms opened a new Corporate Office Building in Millsboro. In 2017, the company acquired grain assets from Lansing Trade Group, LLC, which has operations in Eastville and Painter in Virginia.

In 2024, around 21,000 chickens being raised for Mountaire died in a fire in a poultry facility in North Carolina.

=== COVID-19 outbreak ===
During the Covid-19 outbreak, Mountaire was ordered to continue production along with other food companies deemed essential by the White House. The company had a "coronavirus task force" that was created for safety before finding any cases, in April and May 2020 the company's Selbyville, Delaware plant had an unverified outbreak of COVID-19. Sam Wilson, a Sussex County, Delaware councilman, called further testing at county poultry processing plants "a dumb idea" because they were "losing millions of dollars".

Other processing plants with positive cases include nine cases at a Lumber Bridge, North Carolina plant. Eleven cases were found at a 1500-employee processing plant Siler City, North Carolina, leading Piedmont Health and the North Carolina National Guard to test more employees and family members, which led to a total of 74 positive tests out of 356 tested.

== Controversies ==
=== Animal welfare issues ===
In 2018, Mountaire faced criticism from animal advocacy groups for failing to say whether it used nasal implants for male breeder chickens. The practice, which involves the insertion of a pin into male chickens' beaks to prevent them from accessing food, is considered cruel by animal advocates, and had been phased out by other farms in response to criticism.

In 2023, undercover animal welfare investigators observed a contract farm which raised around 75,000 birds for Mountaire Farms. Over the following year they returned to the farm and visited another in the area. Investigators described seeing many chickens packed closely together, some of whom were dead and decaying. A veterinarian who reviewed the footage found dead birds had been "left to decompose for days to weeks." Investigators also reported finding a pile of manure lying outside the barn that was “completely littered with dead bodies and body parts."

Investigators also obtained government inspection records of two Mountaire Farms slaughterhouses by means of a Freedom of Information Act request, which they released to the public. The records indicated that birds had been scalded alive, buried alive, suffocated to death, amputated, diseased, and contaminated with feces.

=== Labor issues ===
Following a 2024 lawsuit, Mountaire agreed to pay 13.5 million to settle claims that they had conspired to suppress worker wages. At the time, a spokesperson for the company said the "case was against an entire industry, and we believe it had no merit. We are happy to put it behind us and focus on the future.”

In 2021, Mountaire was accused of using chemicals in a chicken-processing plant that led to health issues for workers. The company said this was not true.

Employees have also accused the firm of retaliation, discrimination, denial of bathroom breaks, and union-busting.

== Political contributions ==
Mountaire Farms was the fifth-largest contributor to the 2016 Donald Trump presidential campaign. In 2018 Mountaire contributed $7.7 million towards GOP efforts in that year's midterm elections, which bought Mountaire CEO Ronald Cameron access to the White House on the day of the election to watch the election results. Cameron was appointed to Trump's advisory committee on the pandemic.
