= Michael Forrester (politician) =

American politician

Member of the South Carolina House of Representatives from the 34th district
- In office 2008 – November 8, 2020
- Preceded by: Scott Talley
- Succeeded by: Roger Nutt

Personal details
- Born: February 5, 1951 (age 75) Spartanburg, South Carolina, U.S.
- Party: Republican

P. Michael Forrester (born February 5, 1951) is an American politician. He is a former member of the South Carolina House of Representatives from the 34th District, serving from 2008 to 2020. He is a member of the Republican party.
