= Illinois News Broadcasters Association =

American non-profit organization

The Illinois News Broadcasters Association (INBA) is a non-profit organization made up of rank-and-file broadcast journalists from across the state of Illinois. Founded on January 22, 1955, the INBA now has over 200 members who work in radio, television, wire services, and education. The INBA holds semiannual conventions, moving them to various locations throughout Illinois.

== Operations ==
The INBA is operated entirely through the efforts of volunteers. The association has no paid staff or administrators, and has no physical center of operations.

== Conventions ==
The INBA holds conventions twice annually to offer working journalists, students, and people in related fields opportunities to exchange ideas, learn the latest techniques in broadcasting, and network with each other to encourage strength within the industry. These conventions are held at locations determined each year, generally moving throughout the state in order to promote universal appeal and attraction.

== The INBA Foundation ==
In 2003, the INBA formed the INBA Foundation (INBAF) to raise money for scholarships to aid deserving students of broadcast journalism. The INBAF is a registered 501(c)(3) entity.

== Resources ==
- "About Us" from inba.net
