= The Andersons =

American agricultural business

The Andersons, Inc.
- Type: Public
- Traded as: Nasdaq: ANDE; S&P 600 component
- Industry: Conglomerate
- Founded: 1947; 79 years ago
- Founders: Harold Anderson; Margaret Anderson
- Headquarters: Maumee, Ohio, United States
- Area served: U.S.
- Key people: Patrick E. Bowe (chairman); William E. Krueger (CEO and President)
- Revenue: ▼US$ 11.26 billion (FY 2024)
- Operating income: ▼US$ 190.31 million (FY 2024)
- Net income: ▲US$ 170.70 million (FY 2024)
- Total assets: ▲US$ 4.12 billion (FY 2024)
- Total equity: ▲US$ 1.37 billion (FY 2024)
- Number of employees: 2,299 (2024)
- Website: www.andersonsinc.com

The Andersons, Inc. is an American agribusiness established in 1947, that began as Andersons Truck Terminal (ATT) in the 1940s for the grain industry, headquartered in Maumee, Ohio. It is a diversified company rooted in agriculture that conducts business in the commodity merchandising, renewables, and plant nutrient sectors.

It had revenues of $4,576,331,000 for the 2011 fiscal year ending December 31, 2011.

On August 19, 2003, The Andersons announced to restate income for 2002 and the first quarter of 2003, after they determined that the earnings reported under a five-year grain marketing agreement did not follow a new accounting pronouncement. In total, the company's income remained unchanged.

On November 18, 2005, The Andersons restated the Statement of Cash Flows for the nine-month period ended September 30, 2005, due to an error in the procedures of preparation. On January 15, 2017, The Andersons announced that they will cease their retail operations, closing stores in Maumee, Toledo and Columbus, Ohio, during the second quarter of 2017, and focus on their grain, rail car, ethanol, and plant nutrients units.

== History ==
The Andersons, Inc. was founded in 1947 as The Andersons Truck Terminal (ATT) by Harold & Margaret Anderson. ATT was focused on grain transportation and storage, using grain elevators and a rail transfer station. Their son Richard, known as Dick, was later CEO.

In the 1950s, the company expanded its grain terminals. It also opened its first retail store known as The Andersons Warehouse Market. Andersons began fertilizer blending and then corn milling as well.

In the 1960s, The Andersons opened the first deep-water grain loading facility on the US side of the Great Lakes. They were the first elevator in the US to load 100 car trains in Champaign, Illinois. They also opened the largest steel tank grain storage in Maumee, Ohio. Also in the 1960s, the company entered the Lawn Products business.

As the grain business grew in the 1970s, so did The Andersons. They expanded their river elevator, and continued to ship via rail adding the Gulf ports as a destination. They also built a grain elevator and corn mill in Delphi, Indiana. The original retail store in Maumee, Ohio was replaced by a new, larger store located across the street from the original.

In the 1980s, continuing the growth of the 70s, The Andersons opened a liquid fertilizer facility on the Maumee River, retail stores in Toledo and Columbus, more grain elevators in Indiana and Michigan, and fertilizer facilities in Delphi, Poneto, and Dunkirk, Indiana, as well as Webberville, Michigan. The company also formed The Andersons Management Corporation.

In the 1990s, the company entered the rail leasing business, and built a railcar repair shop in Maumee. The company opened a retail store in Lima, Ohio. The company acquired grain and liquid storage facilities in Clymers, Logansport, Seymour, North Manchester, and Waterloo, Indiana. On February 20, 1996, The Andersons was first listed on NASDAQ, and around that same time the company reached sales of US$1 billion (~$1.84 billion in 2024).

In the 2000s, the company entered the ethanol business, and oversaw the construction of three ethanol plants. The company also expanded its rail division, by adding to its fleet and adding railcar repair shops in South Carolina and Georgia, as well as Mississippi. The company also earned ISO certifications for all of its liquid plant nutrient facilities, expanded its turf products division, and issued a 2-for-1 stock split and follow-on offering. The Andersons also opened a Specialty Food Market in Sylvania, Ohio, in 2007. This store closed in 2016.

On June 3, 2017, The Andersons closed its retail doors for the last time citing a $20 million (~$25.1 million in 2024) loss over 8 years. The retail stores employed nearly 1,050 of The Andersons’ workforce.

Sales for 2023 totalled $14.75 billion (down 17.4%). Net profit totalled $101.19 million (down 29.5%).

As of March 2024, 87.06% of the stock is owned by institutional investors and hedge funds.

== See also ==
- List of S&P 600 companies
- Retail apocalypse
- List of retailers affected by the retail apocalypse
