= Tim Scott 2024 presidential campaign =

American political campaign

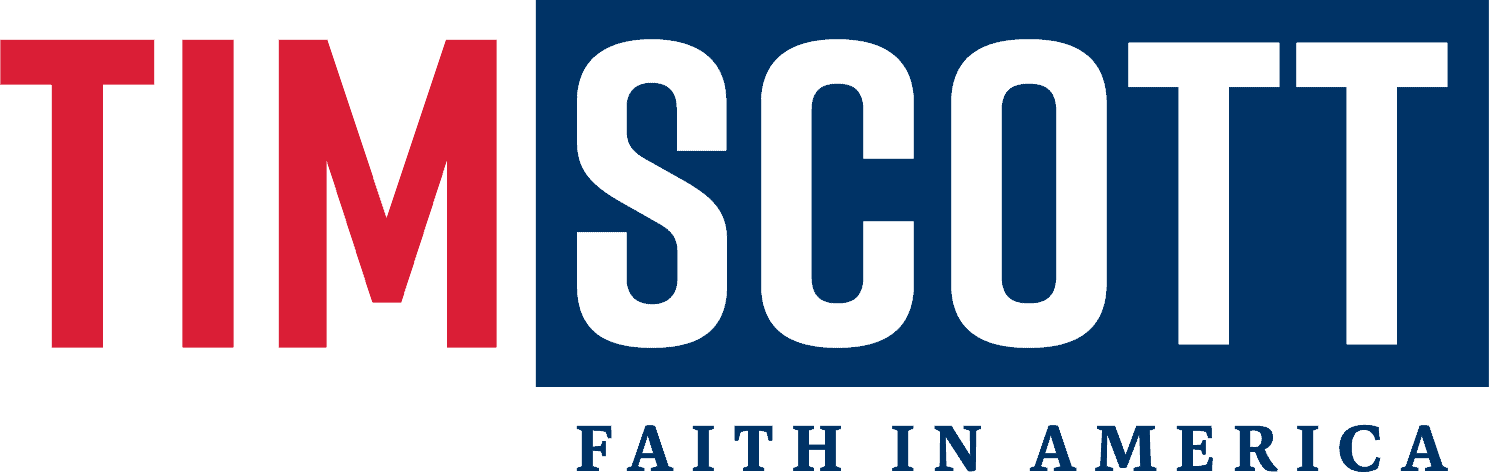
- Campaign: 2024 U.S. presidential election; (2024 Republican primaries)
- Candidate: Tim Scott; U.S. Senator from South Carolina (2013–present)
- Affiliation: Republican Party
- EC formed: April 12, 2023
- Announced: May 22, 2023
- Suspended: November 12, 2023
- Headquarters: North Charleston, South Carolina
- Key people: Jennifer DeCasper (campaign manager)
- Receipts: US$14,492,591.96 (December 31, 2023)
- Slogan: Faith in America

Website
- votetimscott.com

The 2024 presidential campaign of Tim Scott launched on May 22, 2023, when Tim Scott, a United States Senator from South Carolina, announced that he would seek election to the presidency in 2024. His entry into the 2024 Republican Party presidential primaries followed his successful U.S. Senate reelection bid in 2022. On November 12, 2023, Scott suspended his campaign.

Prior to launching his presidential campaign, Scott had been discussed in the mainstream media as a potential 2024 challenger to former president Donald Trump's bid for the nomination. On the day he began running for president, The New York Times reported that Scott brings "a positive, aspirational message" to the Republican field.

== Background ==
Scott has been a U.S. Senator from South Carolina since 2013, having previously been a United States Representative from SC-01 (2011–2013), member of the South Carolina House of Representatives from the 117th district (2009–2011), and a member of the Charleston County Council from the 3rd district (1995–2009). Following former South Carolina Governor Nikki Haley's February 2023 announcement of her 2024 presidential campaign, Scott stated in an interview that there was "certainly room for two" candidates from South Carolina.

Commentators have suggested that the early date of the 2024 South Carolina Republican primary may play to the advantage of both Scott and Haley in the primary. Had he been nominated, he would have been the first African-American presidential nominee of the Republican Party, and if he had been elected, he would have been the first African-American Republican president of the United States and the second African-American president overall after Barack Obama.

== Announcement ==
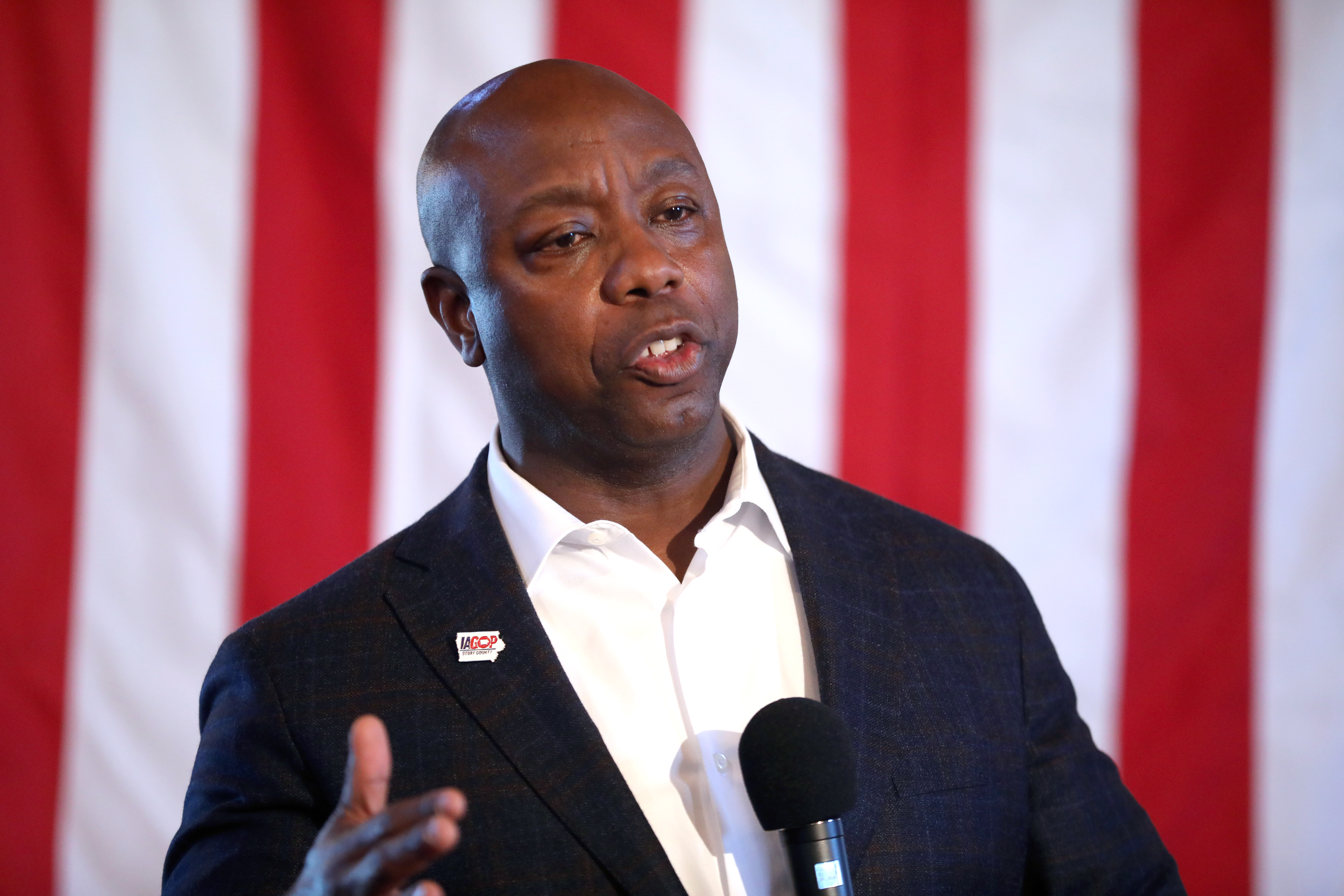
Scott at the 2023 Judge Joseph Story Dinner, Cambridge, Iowa

Scott announced the formation of an exploratory committee for the Republican presidential nomination on April 11, 2023. At the same time, he released a video describing his biography and saying, "I know America is a land of opportunity, not a land of oppression".

On May 19, 2023, he officially filed with the Federal Election Commission to run for president. Scott officially announced his candidacy to the public on May 22, 2023, at an event in Charleston, South Carolina.

== Financials ==
Several billionaires made large donations to Scott in July 2023.

== Campaign highlights ==
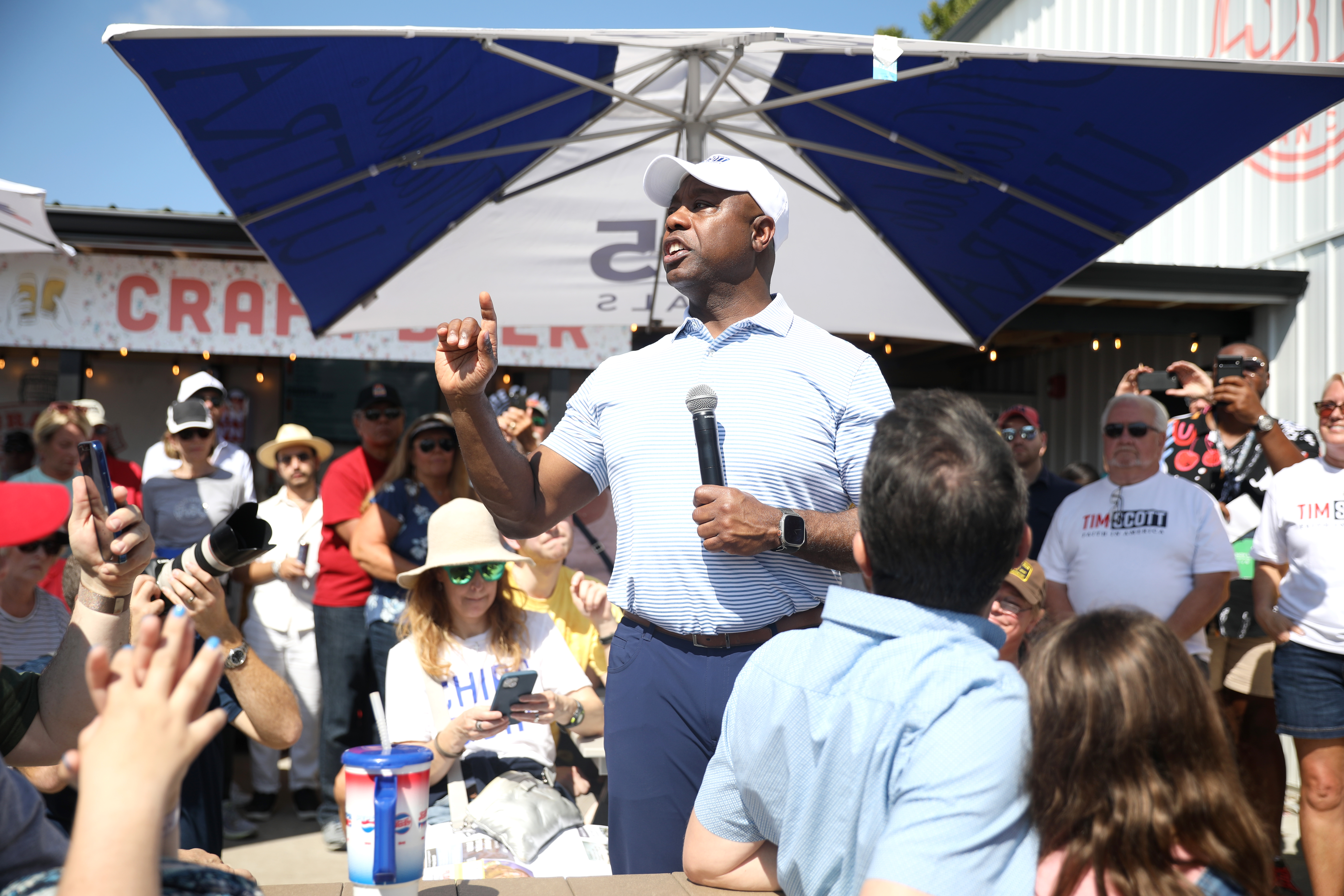
Scott speaking to supporters at the 2023 Iowa State Fair

On June 5, 2023, Scott was a talk show guest on The View, where he discussed issues including systemic racism and whether his own success is an exception to the rule, or a sign that the country has made broader progress. He believes the latter.

A couple weeks later, Scott responded to former President Obama's criticism that Republican politicians who are black should give an "honest accounting" of racism in the United States. Scott answered that he supported funding for historically Black colleges, and said "There is a way for us to elevate poverty, not by a race, but by the statistics themselves."

On August 28, Scott unveiled a 12-point education plan that advocated for breaking "the back of the teachers' unions", which he charged had joined with President Biden and Big Tech in being "on a mission to make parents less important."

In late October, Scott changed his focus towards Iowa in the runup to the 2024 Iowa Republican presidential caucuses. He indicated in an interview with Hugh Hewitt on October 30, 2023 that he would drop out of the race if he performed poorly there.

On November 10, Scott announced that he would be cancelling a four-day campaign trip and returning to his home in Charleston due to the flu during a critical period as that state's primary approaches.

== Presidential debates ==
At the first Republican presidential debate, Scott appeared alongside Ron DeSantis, Mike Pence, Nikki Haley, Chris Christie, Vivek Ramaswamy, Asa Hutchinson, and Doug Burgum. The Hill named DeSantis, Scott, Burgum, and Hutchinson the debate's losers, noting that Scott was "well-liked by many Republicans but his low-key affability isn't ideal for contentious debate nights." Anthony Zurcher of BBC wrote that Scott's choice to stay above the fray "won't help him win over many voters, but it could burnish his credentials if he wants to be Mr Trump's vice-presidential pick." A post-debate poll, conducted by JL Partners, asked registered Republican voters who gave the best performance in the debate. Scott came in fourth place with 8%.

== Suspension ==
Scott announced the suspension of his campaign on November 12 in an interview with Trey Gowdy on the Fox News show Sunday Night in America, with staffers expressing frustration with the lack of notice. In his message, Scott said "I think the voters, who are the most remarkable people on the planet, have been really clear that they're telling me: 'Not now, Tim.'"

Scott got 1,598 votes during the whole 2024 Republican Party presidential primaries.

=== Aftermath ===
On January 19, 2024, Scott endorsed former President Donald Trump for President. There was broad comment in the press on Scott's decision to endorse Trump rather than former South Carolina Governor Nikki Haley, who had appointed Scott to the United States Senate to replace Jim DeMint.
