= Ron Cameron (businessman) =

American businessman (born 1945)

- Born: 1944 or 1945 (age 79–80)
- Education: University of Arkansas (BA)
- Title: Owner and chairman, Mountaire Farms
- Spouse: Nina Cameron
- Children: 4

Ronald M. Cameron (born 1945) is an American businessman, and the owner and chairman of Mountaire Farms.

== Early life ==
Cameron is the son of Ted Cameron, who was chairman of Mountaire, and grandson of Guy Cameron, who founded Mountaire Corporation in 1914 (although it was then known by a different name).

He earned a bachelor's degree in business from the University of Arkansas.

== Career ==
Cameron joined Mountaire in 1968, and became president and CEO in 1978, after the death of his father. Mountaire is the sixth-largest poultry company in the US.

In 2009, Cameron was named the 14th richest Arkansan by Arkansas Business.

Cameron is also a member of Bear State Financial Holdings LLC, which bought First Federal Bancshares of Arkansas Inc. The CEO of First Federal, Dabbs Cavin, is a former employee of Cameron's. Cameron is the former director of Doulos Ministries in Littleton, Colorado.

== Political activities ==
Cameron is a major donor to Arkansas politician Tom Cotton and The Club for Growth. Cameron also donated a million dollars to Freedom Partners in 2014. In the Republican Party presidential primaries, 2016 he contributed $3 million to the Super PAC supporting Mike Huckabee and after Huckabee dropped out donated 5 million to Conservative Solutions PAC which supported Marco Rubio's bid.

== Personal life ==
Cameron is married to Nina, they have four children, and live in Arkansas.
