= Scott Talley =

American politician (born 1976)

Member of the South Carolina Senate from the 12th district
- In office November 14, 2016 – November 14, 2024
- Preceded by: Lee Bright
- Succeeded by: Roger Nutt

Member of the South Carolina House of Representatives from the 34th district
- In office 2000–2008
- Preceded by: John D. Hawkins
- Succeeded by: Michael Forrester (politician)

Personal details
- Born: June 25, 1976 (age 50) Spartanburg, South Carolina, United States
- Party: Republican
- Spouse: Kelly J. Bigham (m. 2003)
- Children: 3
- Education: Wofford College (BA); University of South Carolina School of Law (JD)
- Profession: Attorney, politician

Scott F. Talley (born June 25, 1976) is an American politician. He is a former member of the South Carolina Senate from the 12th District (Spartanburg), serving from 2016 to 2024. Previously, he served the 34th House District in the South Carolina House of Representatives. He is a member of the Republican party.

== S.C. House of Representatives (2000–2008) ==
=== S.C. Senate ===
Talley was first elected to represent South Carolina's 12th Senate District, covering parts of Spartanburg County, in 2016. Previously, he challenged his predecessor, Lee Bright, in 2008. However, it would take a second primary challenge in 2016 for Talley to successfully unseat the incumbent.

In 2022, Talley announced he would be retiring and not seeking re-election in the 2024 race.

== Endorsements ==
In June 2023, Talley endorsed Tim Scott in the 2024 United States presidential election.

== Political views ==
Talley supports the legalization of medicinal cannabis for patients with debilitating conditions as recommended by a licensed physician.

== Personal life ==
Talley was born on June 25, 1976 in Spartanburg, South Carolina, where he currently resides today. He and his wife, Kelly, have three children. He is the Vice President of the Tyger River Foundation, an organization dedicated to the promotion, protection, and restoration of the natural and historic resources of the Tyger River Basin.

== Electoral history ==
Year	Office	Type	Party	Main opponent	Party	Votes for Talley				Result	Swing	Ref.
Year	Office	Type	Party	Main opponent	Party	Total	%	P.	±%	Result	Swing	Ref.
2000	S.C. Representative	Rep. primary	Republican	Charles A. Nichols	Republican	2,533	80.44%	1st	N/A	Won	N/A	
2000	S.C. Representative	General	Republican	Write-in	N/A	8,816	99.65%	1st	N/A	Won	Hold	
2002	S.C. Representative	General	Republican	Write-in	N/A	6,695	99.84%	1st	+0.19%	Won	Hold	
2004	S.C. Representative	General	Republican	Royce A. Justice	Democratic	8,900	65.43%	1st	-34.41%	Won	Hold	
2006	S.C. Representative	General	Republican	Write-in	N/A	6,980	99.15%	1st	+33.72%	Won	Hold	
2008	S.C. Senate	Rep. primary	Republican	Lee Bright (Note: Incumbent seeking re-election.)	Republican	4,194	44.15%	1st	N/A	Runoff	N/A	
2008	S.C. Senate	Rep. primary runoff	Republican	Lee Bright	Republican	3,701	48.70%	2nd	N/A	Lost	N/A	
2016	S.C. Senate	Rep. primary	Republican	Lee Bright	Republican	2,594	26.56%	2nd	-17.59%	Runoff	N/A	
2016	S.C. Senate	Rep. primary runoff	Republican	Lee Bright	Republican	4,863	51.60%	1st	+2.90%	Won	N/A	
2016	S.C. Senate	General	Republican	Write-in	N/A	41,352	98.36%	1st	N/A	Won	Hold	
2020	S.C. Senate	Rep. primary	Republican	Mark Lynch	Republican	8,015	52.82%	1st	+1.22%	Won	N/A	
2020	S.C. Senate	General	Republican	Dawn Bingham	Democratic	42,201	64.86%	1st	-33.50%	Won	Hold	

== Notes ==
South Carolina House of Representatives
Preceded by John D. Hawkins	Member of the South Carolina House of Representatives from the 34th district 2001-2008	Succeeded by Michael Forrester (politician)
South Carolina Senate
Preceded by Lee Bright	Member of the South Carolina Senate from the 12th district 2016–2024	Incumbent
