= Roger Nutt =

American politician (born 1965)

Member of the South Carolina Senate from the 12th district
- In office November 11, 2024 – January 5, 2026
- Preceded by: Scott Talley
- Succeeded by: Lee Bright

Member of the SC House of Representatives from the 34th district
- In office 2020–2024
- Preceded by: Michael Forrester (politician)
- Succeeded by: Sarita Edgerton

Personal details
- Born: September 20, 1965 (age 61) Johnson City, Tennessee, U.S.
- Party: Republican
- Spouse: Tracy Fennell (m. 2001)
- Children: 3
- Education: Tennessee Technological University (BS)
- Profession: Engineer

Roger A. Nutt is an American engineer and politician. He is a former member of the South Carolina Senate, representing the 12 district from 2024 to 2026. He previously served in the South Carolina House of Representatives from 2020 to 2024. He is a member of the Republican Party.

== Political career ==
=== 2020 South Carolina House race ===
In 2020, Nutt announced his bid for the State House after serving on Spartanburg County Council for 10 years. Nutt ran uncontested and served 2 terms as a Representative for House District 34.

=== 2024 South Carolina Senate race ===
In 2023, Nutt announced his run for the State Senate seat held by retiring incumbent Scott Talley. Nutt, businessman Skip Davenport, former Spartanburg County Clerk of Court Hope Blackley, and former State Senator Lee Bright faced each other in the Republican primary. Nutt bested Bright in the Republican primary runoff, and became the Republican nominee. He won the State Senate seat over physician and Democratic nominee Octavia Amaechi in the general election.

Nutt serves on the Senate Agriculture and Natural Resources, Education, Family and Veterans' Services; Fish, Game and Forestry and Judiciary committees.

In August 2025 Nutt announced his resignation from the Senate, effective in January 2026, after being diagnosed with Alzheimer's disease. A special election for his seat was scheduled for December 23, 2025. Former State Senator Lee Bright, who won the Republican Primary, had no Democratic opposition and won the seat.
