= Sylleste Davis =

American politician

Sylleste H. Davis
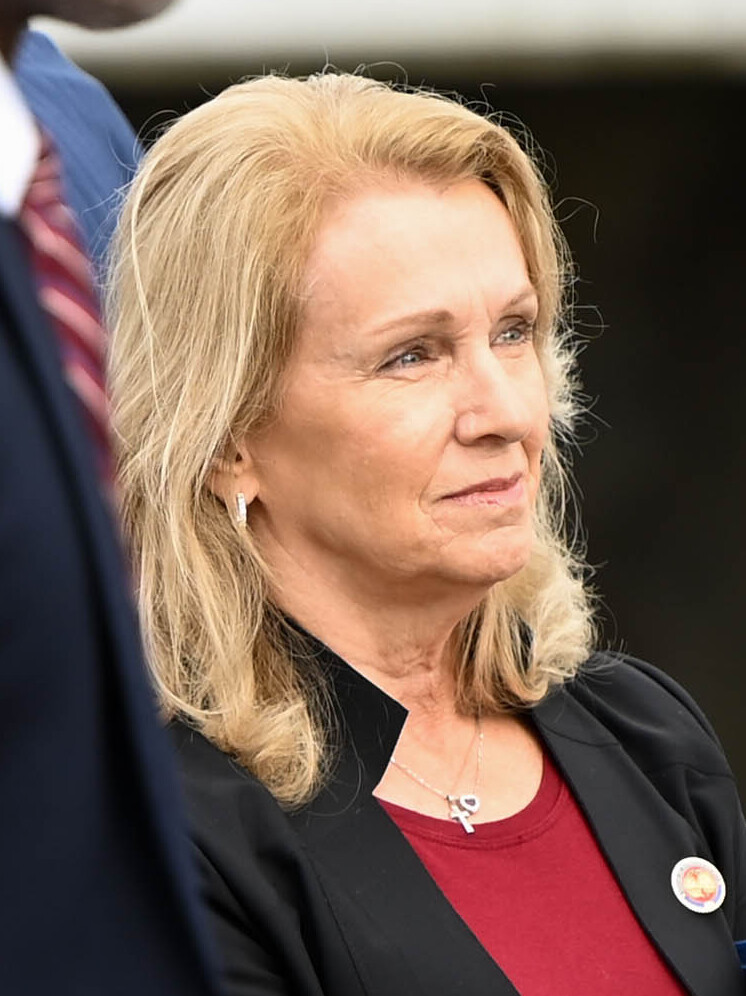
- Davis in 2024

Member of the South Carolina House of Representatives from the 100th district
- Incumbent
- Assumed office June 13, 2016
- Preceded by: Edward Southard

Personal details
- Born: October 12, 1961 (age 64) Charlotte, North Carolina, United States
- Party: Republican
- Education: College of Charleston (B.S.); Webster University (M.A.)

Sylleste H. Davis (born October 12, 1961) is an American politician. She is a member of the South Carolina House of Representatives from the 100th District, serving since 2016. She is a member of the Republican party.

Davis is Chair of the House Medical, Military, Public and Municipal Affairs Committee.

In 2024, Davis was among the state legislators appointed to serve on the Robert Smalls Monument Commission.

== Electoral history ==
South Carolina House of Representatives District 100
Year	Candidate	Votes	Pct	Candidate	Votes	Pct	Candidate	Votes	Pct
2016 Special General Election	Sylleste Davis	Winner							
2016 Republican Primary	Sylleste Davis	Winner		Robbie Metts					
2016 General Election	Sylleste Davis	809	97.4%	Tonia Aiken-Taylor	6,294	33.1%			
2018 Republican Primary	Sylleste Davis	2,534	50.4%	Tom Fernandez	2,489	49.6			
2018 General Election	Sylleste Davis	10,809	62.5%	Michael Yates	6,353	36.7%	Others/Write-in	127	0.7%
