= 1914 South Carolina gubernatorial election =

1914 South Carolina Democratic gubernatorial primary runoff
- September 8, 1914
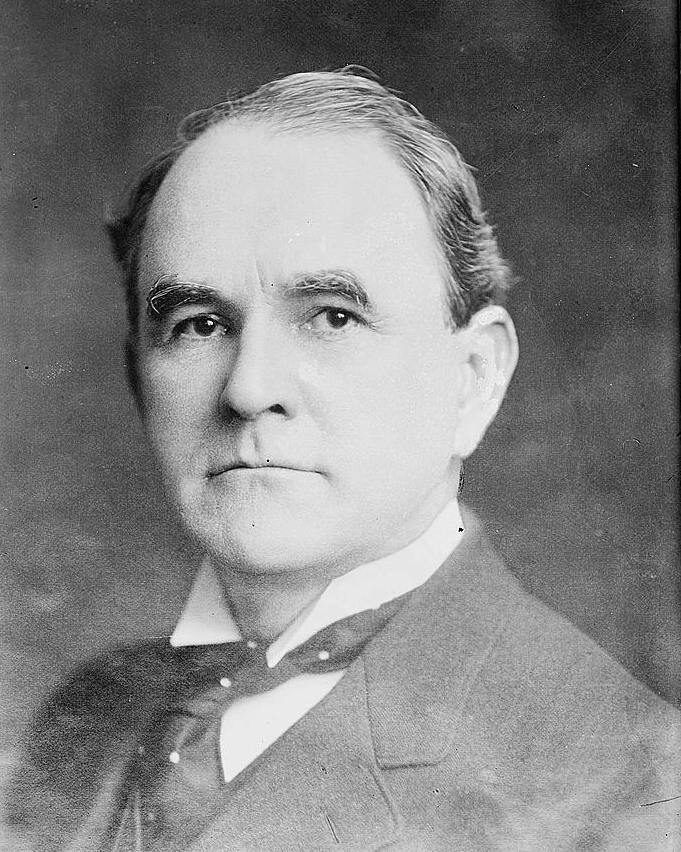

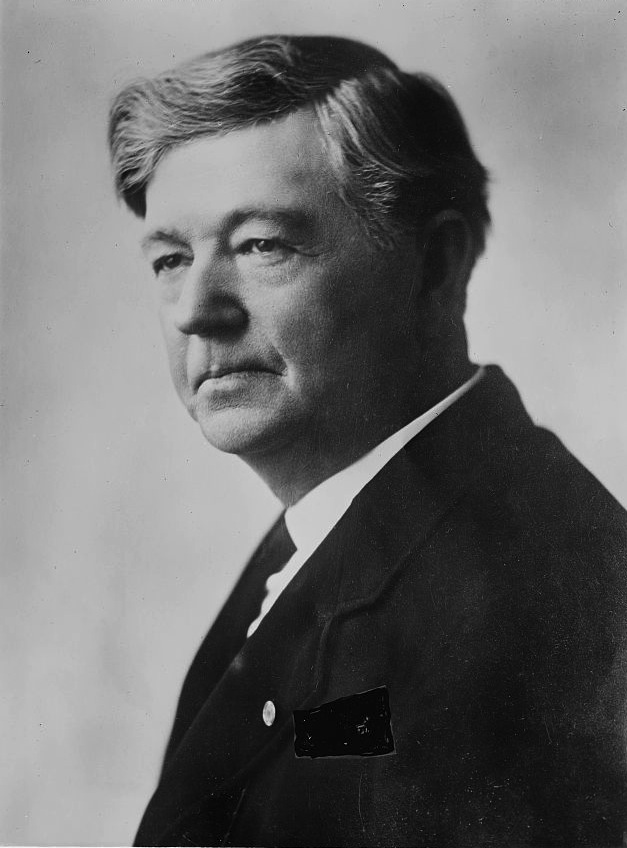
Candidate	Richard Irvine Manning III	John Gardiner Richards Jr.
Party	Democratic	Democratic
Popular vote	73,969	45,099
Percentage	62.12%	37.88%
Governor of South Carolina before election
Cole Blease
Democratic
Elected Governor of South Carolina
Richard Manning III
Democratic

The 1914 South Carolina gubernatorial election was held on November 3, 1914, to select the governor of the state of South Carolina. Richard Irvine Manning III emerged from the crowded Democratic primary to win in the runoff and overwhelmingly won the effectively one-party state's general election to become the 92nd governor of South Carolina.

== Democratic primary ==
=== Candidates ===
- John B. Adger Mullally
- Lowndes J. Browning
- John G. Clinkscales
- Robert Archer Cooper, former State Representative from Laurens
- John T. Duncan, candidate for Governor in 1910 and 1912
- William C. Irby Jr.
- Richard Irvine Manning III, former State Senator from Sumter County and grandson of Governor Richard Irvine Manning I
- John Gardiner Richards Jr., former State Representative from Liberty Hill, Kershaw County and candidate for Governor in 1910
- Charles Carroll Sims
- Charles Aurelius Smith, Lieutenant Governor of South Carolina
- Mendel L. Smith

=== Campaign ===
The South Carolina Democratic Party held their primary for governor on August 25 and progressive reformer Richard Irvine Manning III emerged as the winner in a crowded field. He garnered the support from the candidates eliminated in the runoff election and was able to score a decisive victory over John Gardiner Richards, Jr., the candidate favored by former governor Coleman Livingston Blease, on September 8.

=== Results ===
Democratic Primary
Candidate	Votes	%
John Gardiner Richards, Jr.	26,801	20.5
Richard Irvine Manning III	25,397	19.5
Robert Archer Cooper	25,053	19.2
John G. Clinkscales	17,126	13.1
William C. Irby, Jr.	14,652	11.2
Mendel L. Smith	9,905	7.6
Charles Aurelius Smith	5,842	4.5
Charles Carroll Sims	2,773	2.1
Lowndes J. Browning	1,513	1.2
John T. Duncan	793	0.6
John B. Adger Mullally	665	0.5

=== Runoff results ===
Democratic Primary Runoff
Candidate	Votes	%	±%
Richard Irvine Manning III	73,969	62.1	+42.6
John Gardiner Richards, Jr.	45,099	37.9	+17.4

== General election ==
The general election was held on November 3, 1914, and Richard Irvine Manning III was elected the next governor of South Carolina. Being a non-presidential election and few contested races, turnout was much less than the previous gubernatorial election.

South Carolina Gubernatorial Election, 1914
Party	Candidate	Votes	%	±%
Democratic	Richard Irvine Manning III	34,606	99.76	+0.3
Socialist	R.B. Britton	83	0.24	−0.3
Majority		34,523	99.52	+0.6
Turnout		34,689		
Democratic hold				

65+% won by Manning

== See also ==
- Governor of South Carolina
- List of governors of South Carolina
- South Carolina gubernatorial elections

Preceded by 1912	South Carolina gubernatorial elections	Succeeded by 1916
