= 1913 United States Senate election in South Carolina =

1912 Democratic Senate primary in South Carolina
- August 27, 1912
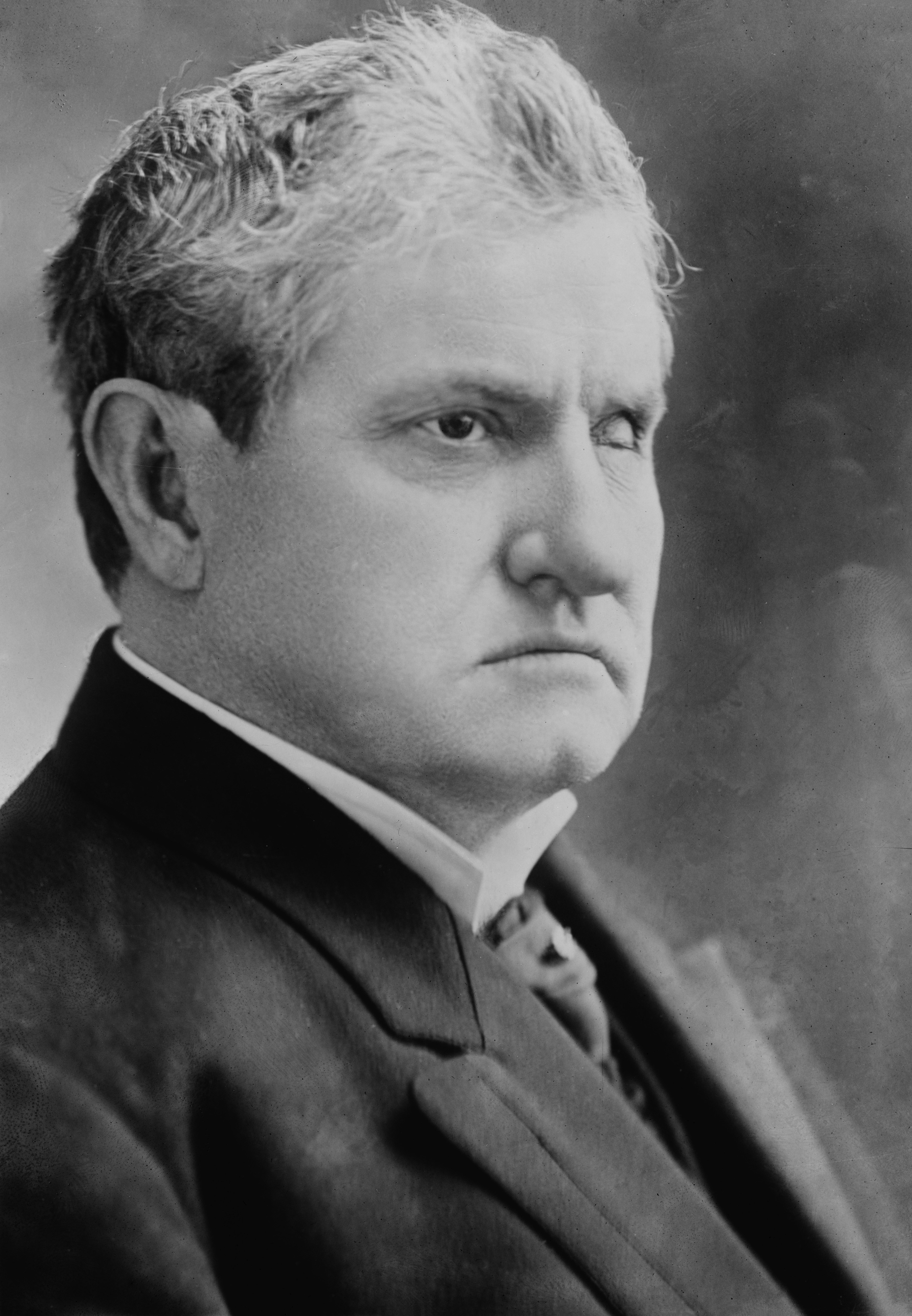

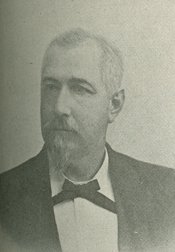

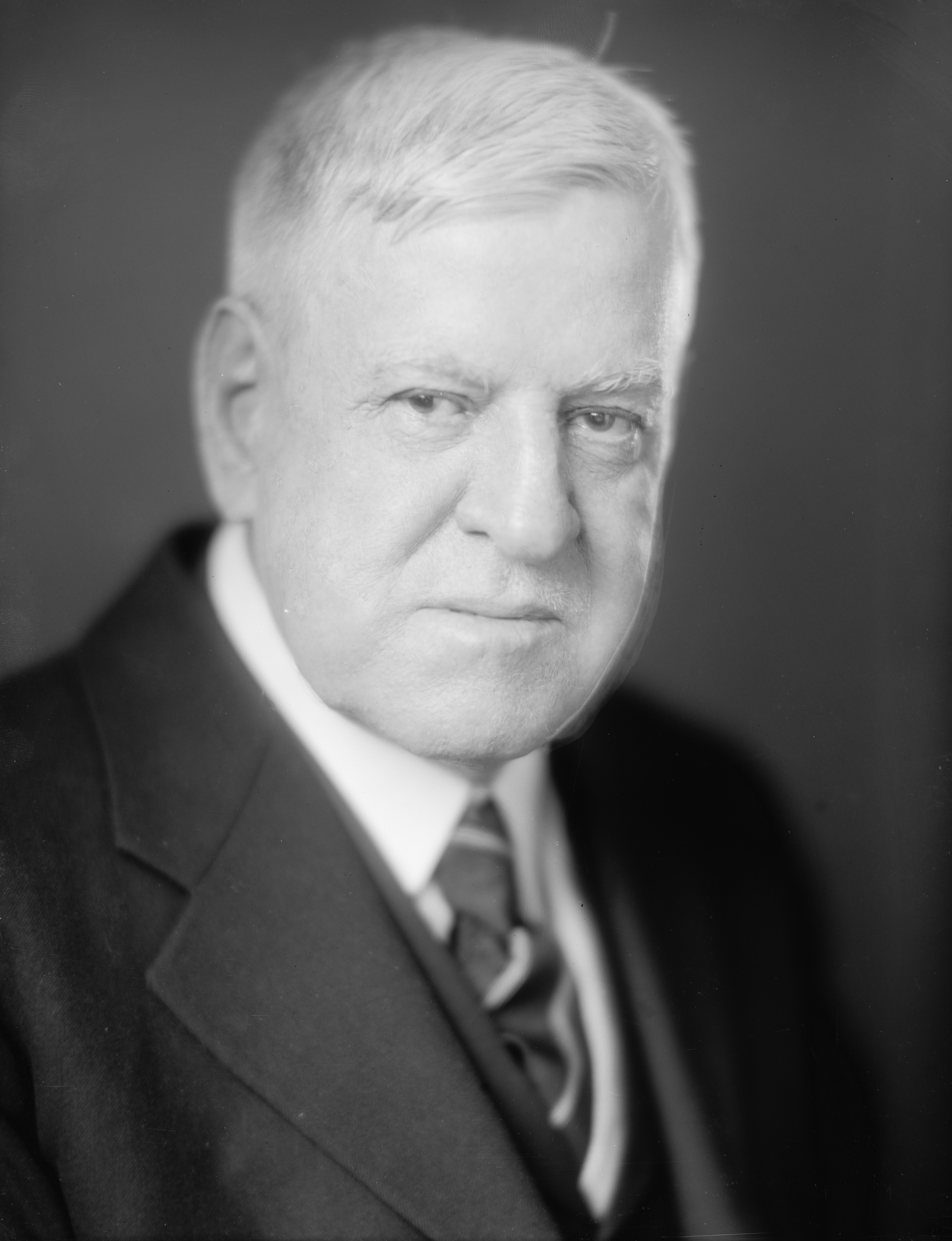
Nominee	Ben Tillman	W. Jasper Talbert	Nathaniel B. Dial
Party	Democratic	Democratic	Democratic
Popular vote	73,148	37,141	28,476
Percentage	52.7%	26.8%	20.5%
- Results by county Tillman: 40–50% 50–60% 60–70% 70–80% 80–90% Talbert: 40–50% Dial: 30–40%
U.S. senator before election
Ben Tillman
Democratic
Elected U.S. Senator
Ben Tillman
Democratic

The 1913 South Carolina United States Senate election was held on January 28, 1913, when the South Carolina legislature met and unanimously ratified the results of the August 27, 1912 primary. Incumbent Senator Ben Tillman was re-elected to a fourth term in office.

Prior to the ratification of the 17th Amendment to the United States Constitution, U.S. Senators were elected by the state legislature. However, the Democratic Party of South Carolina organized primary elections for the U.S. Senate beginning in 1896 and the General Assembly would confirm the choice of the Democratic voters. Tillman handily defeated former U.S. Representative W. Jasper Talbert and businessman Nathaniel B. Dial in the primary election.

== Democratic primary ==
=== Candidates ===
- Benjamin Tillman, incumbent Senator since 1895
- W. Jasper Talbert, former U.S. Representative from Parksville
- Nathaniel B. Dial, businessman and former Mayor of Laurens

=== Campaign ===
Ben Tillman, a Senator since 1895, drew opposition in the Democratic primary for the first time during his career. He had long avoided any opposition because of his influence in the Democratic Party in the state, but by 1912 he had moderated his positions and lost the radical edge that had allowed him to build up a hard core following of support. The radicals in the state electorate had thrown their support to Coleman Livingston Blease in the gubernatorial election of 1910 and the Bleasites were determined to knock his chief opponent, Tillman, out of office. W. Jasper Talbert emerged as the candidate of the Bleasites and Nathaniel B. Dial entered the race as an alternative to the two. The voters of the state split their support between the Tillmanite and Bleasite factions as both Tillman and Blease won their respective primaries.

=== Results ===
Democratic Primary
Candidate	Votes	%
Benjamin Tillman (incumbent)	73,148	52.7
W. Jasper Talbert	37,141	26.8
Nathaniel B. Dial	28,476	20.5

== Election ==
The General Assembly met and ratified the choice of the primary voters, re-electing Tillman for a third term.

== See also ==
- List of United States senators from South Carolina
- 1912 and 1913 United States Senate elections
- 1912 United States House of Representatives elections in South Carolina
- 1912 South Carolina gubernatorial election
