= Electoral history of James F. Byrnes =

List of elections featuring James F. Byrnes as a candidate

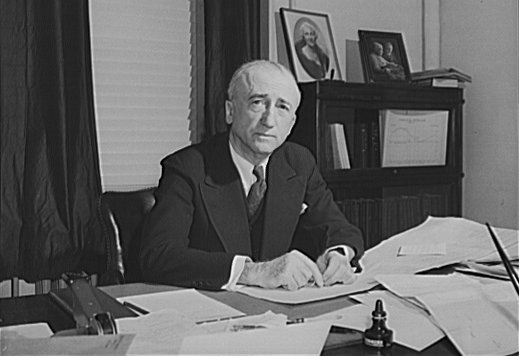
James F. Byrnes, 1943

Electoral history of James F. Byrnes, 49th United States Secretary of State (1945-1947), Associate Justice of the United States Supreme Court (1941-1942), United States Senator from South Carolina (1931-1941), 104th Governor of South Carolina (1951-1955) and United States Representative from South Carolina (1911-1925)

South Carolina's 2nd congressional district, 1910:

- James F. Byrnes (D) - 4,392 (100.00%)

South Carolina's 2nd congressional district, 1912:

- James F. Byrnes (D) (inc.) - 6,133 (100.00%)

South Carolina's 2nd congressional district, 1914:

- James F. Byrnes (D) (inc.) - 4,521 (100.00%)

South Carolina's 2nd congressional district, 1916:

- James F. Byrnes (D) (inc.) - 7,681 (98.46%)
- Isaac Meyers (R) - 120 (1.54%)

South Carolina's 2nd congressional district, 1918:

- James F. Byrnes (D) (inc.) - 3,155 (100.00%)

South Carolina's 2nd congressional district, 1920:

- James F. Byrnes (D) (inc.) - 6,685 (100.00%)

South Carolina's 2nd congressional district, 1922:

- James F. Byrnes (D) (inc.) - 4,163 (100.00%)

Democratic primary for the United States Senate from South Carolina, 1924:

- Coleman Livingston Blease - 83,738 (41.78%)
- James F. Byrnes - 67,727 (33.79%)
- Nathaniel B. Dial (inc.) - 44,425 (22.17%)
- J. J. McMahan - 4,530 (2.26%)

Democratic primary runoff for the United States Senate from South Carolina, 1924:

- Coleman Livingston Blease - 100,686 (50.56%)
- James F. Byrnes - 98,465 (49.44%)

Democratic primary for the United States Senate from South Carolina, 1930:

- Coleman Livingston Blease (inc.) - 111,989 (45.57%)
- James F. Byrnes - 94,242 (38.35%)
- Leon W. Harris - 39,512 (16.08%)

Democratic primary runoff for the United States Senate from South Carolina, 1930:

- James F. Byrnes - 120,755 (50.95%)
- Coleman Livingston Blease (inc.) - 116,264 (49.05%)

United States Senate election in South Carolina, 1930:

- James F. Byrnes (D) - 16,211 (100.00%)

United States Senate election in South Carolina, 1936:

- James F. Byrnes (D) (inc.) - 113,696 (98.56%)
- Joseph A. Tolbert (R) - 961 (0.83%)
- Marion W. Seabrook (R) - 702 (0.61%)
- H. J. Johnson (?) - 1 (0.00%)

Associate Justice of the United States Supreme Court, 1941 (Senate confirmation):

- Yea - unanimously (voice vote)

United States Secretary of State, 1945 (Senate confirmation):

- Yea - unanimously

Democratic primary for Governor of South Carolina, 1950:

- James F. Byrnes - 248,069 (71.63%)
- Lester L. Bates - 63,143 (18.23%)
- Thomas H. Pope Jr. - 29,622 (8.55%)
- Marcus A. Stone - 5,495 (1.59%)

South Carolina gubernatorial election, 1950:

- James F. Byrnes (D) - 50,663 (100.00%)
