= 1918 South Carolina gubernatorial election =

1918 South Carolina Democratic gubernatorial primary
- August 27, 1918
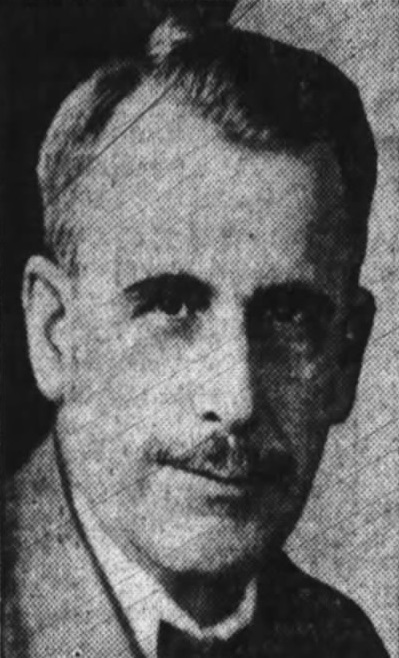

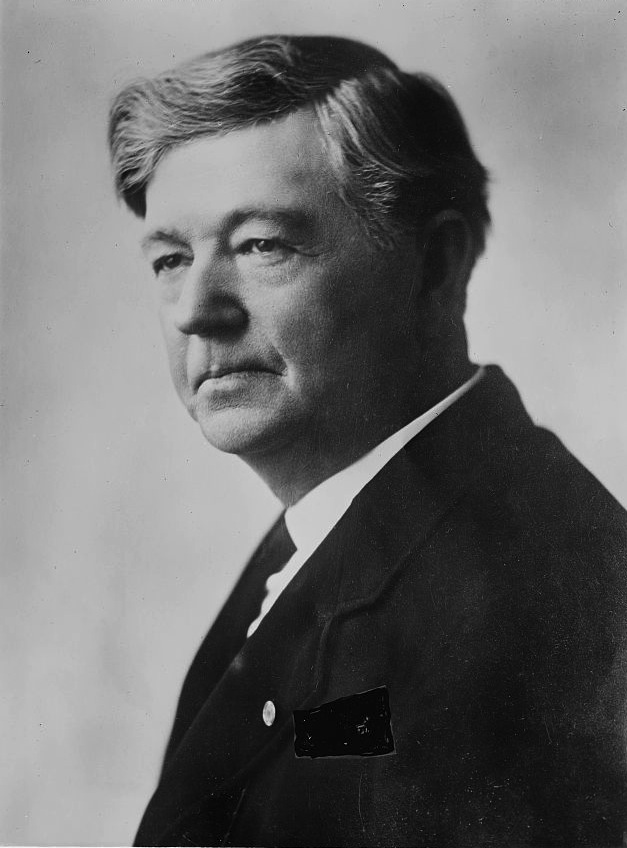

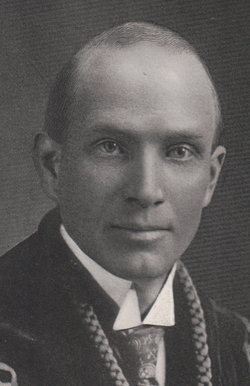
Candidate	Robert A. Cooper	John Gardiner Richards Jr.	Andrew Bethea
Party	Democratic	Democratic	Democratic
Popular vote	61,900	31,230	10,362
Percentage	57.94%	29.23%	9.70%
Governor of South Carolina before election
Richard Manning III
Democratic
Elected Governor of South Carolina
Robert Archer Cooper
Democratic

The 1918 South Carolina gubernatorial election was held on November 5, 1918, to select the governor of the state of South Carolina. Robert Archer Cooper emerged from the crowded Democratic primary and ran unopposed in the one-party state's general election to become the 93rd governor of South Carolina.

== Democratic primary ==
=== Candidates ===
- Andrew Bethea, Lieutenant Governor of South Carolina
- Robert Archer Cooper, former State Representative from Laurens and candidate for Governor in 1914 and 1916
- John M. DesChamps, candidate for Governor in 1916
- John T. Duncan, perennial candidate
- John L. McLaurin, planter and former U.S. Senator (1897–1903) and State Senator from Bennettsville (1913–1914)
- John Gardiner Richards Jr., former State Representative from Liberty Hill, Kershaw County and candidate for Governor in 1910 and 1914

=== Campaign ===
The South Carolina Democratic Party held their primary for governor on August 27 and progressive reformer Robert Archer Cooper emerged as the winner in a crowded field. He garnered more than 50 percent of the vote in the primary election and was able to avoid a runoff election.

=== Results ===
Democratic Primary
Candidate	Votes	%
Robert Archer Cooper	61,900	57.9
John Gardiner Richards, Jr.	31,230	29.2
Andrew J. Bethea	10,362	9.7
John L. McLaurin	1,584	1.5
John T. Duncan	1,256	1.2
John M. DesChamps	496	0.5

== General election ==
The general election was held on November 5, 1918, and Robert Archer Cooper was elected the next governor of South Carolina without opposition. Being a non-presidential election and few contested races, turnout was much less than the previous gubernatorial election.

South Carolina Gubernatorial Election, 1918
Party	Candidate	Votes	%	±%
Democratic	Robert Archer Cooper	25,267	100.00	+2.1
Majority		25,267	100.00	+3.9
Turnout		25,267		
Democratic hold				

== See also ==
- Governor of South Carolina
- List of governors of South Carolina
- South Carolina gubernatorial elections

Preceded by 1916	South Carolina gubernatorial elections	Succeeded by 1920
