= 1922 South Carolina gubernatorial election =

1922 South Carolina Democratic gubernatorial primary runoff
- September 12, 1922
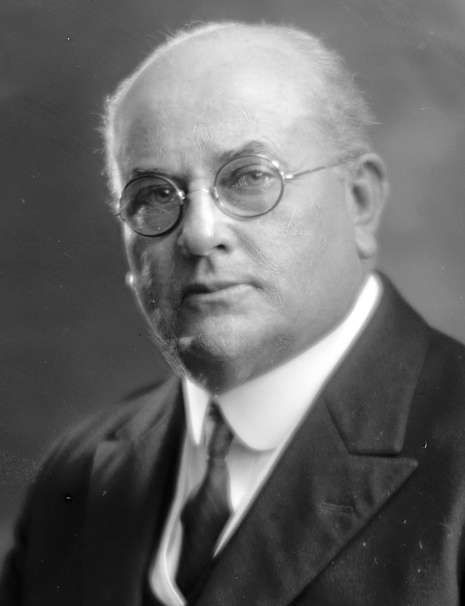

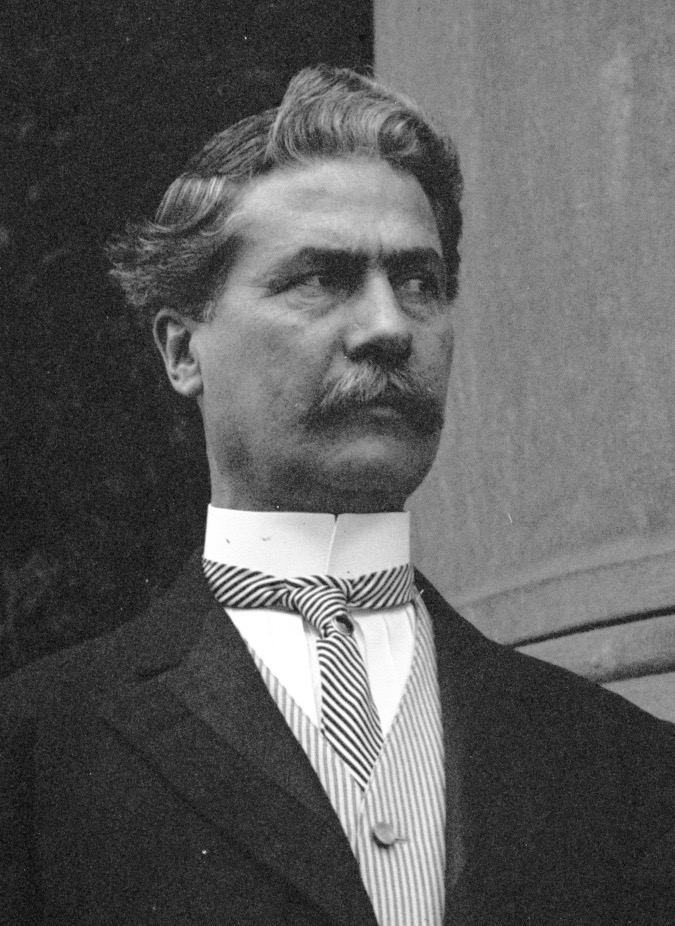
Candidate	Thomas McLeod	Cole Blease
Party	Democratic	Democratic
Popular vote	100,114	85,834
Percentage	53.84%	46.16%
Governor of South Carolina before election
Robert Archer Cooper
Democratic
Elected Governor of South Carolina
Thomas Gordon McLeod
Democratic

The 1922 South Carolina gubernatorial election was held on November 7, 1922, to select the governor of the state of South Carolina. Thomas Gordon McLeod won the Democratic primary and ran unopposed in the general election becoming the 95th governor of South Carolina.

== Democratic primary ==
=== Candidates ===
- Cole L. Blease, former Governor of South Carolina (1911–15)
- J.J. Cantey
- William Coleman
- John T. Duncan, perennial candidate
- George K. Laney
- Thomas Gordon McLeod, former Lieutenant Governor of South Carolina (1907–11)

=== Campaign ===
The South Carolina Democratic Party held their primary for governor in the summer of 1922 and it shaped up to be a heated contest between Thomas Gordon McLeod and former Governor Cole Blease. McLeod emerged victorious from the runoff and effectively became the next governor of South Carolina because there was no opposition in the general election on account of South Carolina's status as an effective one-party state.

=== Results ===
Democratic Primary
Candidate	Votes	%
Coleman Livingston Blease	77,798	44.8
Thomas Gordon McLeod	65,768	37.9
George K. Laney	23,164	13.4
William Coleman	3,797	2.2
John T. Duncan	1,780	1.0
J.J. Cantey	1,260	0.7

=== Runoff results ===
Democratic Primary Runoff
Candidate	Votes	%	±%
Thomas Gordon McLeod	100,114	53.8	+15.9
Coleman Livingston Blease	85,834	46.2	+1.4

== General election ==
The general election was held on November 7, 1922, and Thomas McLeod was elected the next governor of South Carolina without opposition. Being a non-presidential election and few contested races, turnout was approximately half of that for 1920.

South Carolina Gubernatorial Election, 1922
Party	Candidate	Votes	%	±%
Democratic	Thomas Gordon McLeod	34,065	100.00	Steady
Majority		34,065	100.00	Steady
Turnout		34,065		
Democratic hold				

65+% won by McLeod

== See also ==
- Governor of South Carolina
- List of governors of South Carolina
- South Carolina gubernatorial elections

Preceded by 1920	South Carolina gubernatorial elections	Succeeded by 1924
