= 1916 South Carolina gubernatorial election =

1916 South Carolina Democratic gubernatorial primary runoff
- September 12, 1916
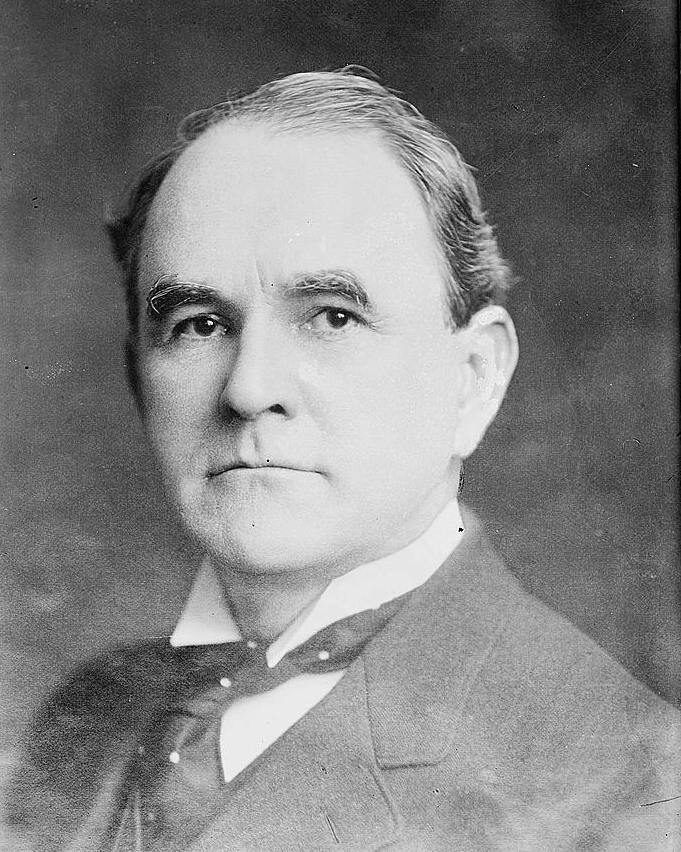

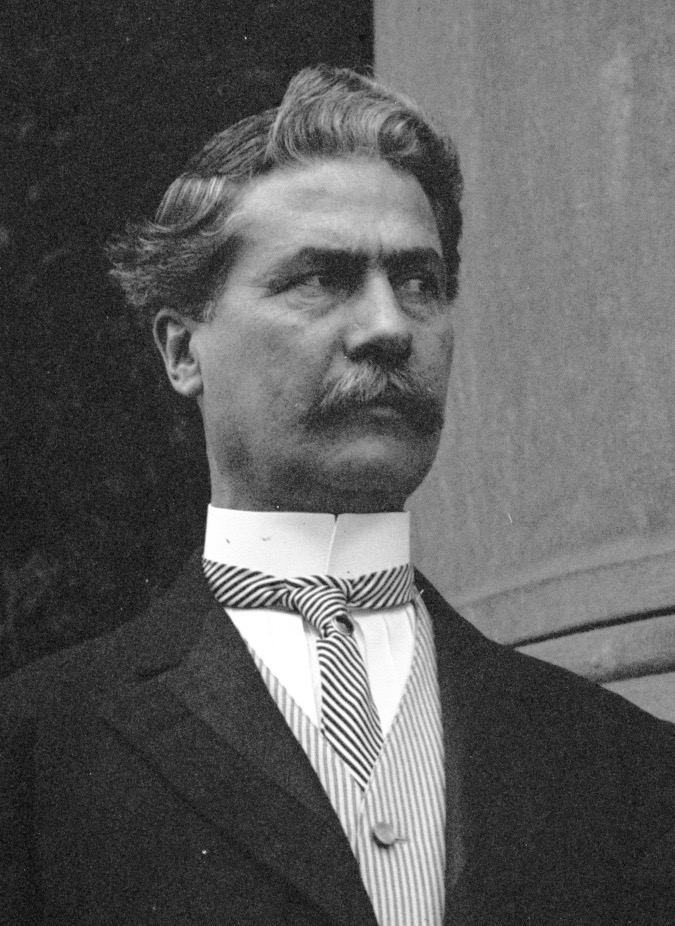
Candidate	Richard Irvine Manning III	Cole Blease
Party	Democratic	Democratic
Popular vote	71,463	66,791
Percentage	51.69%	48.31%
- County results Manning: 50–60% 60–70% 70–80% Blease: 50–60% 60–70%
Governor of South Carolina before election
Richard Manning III
Democratic
Elected Governor of South Carolina
Richard Manning III
Democratic

The 1916 South Carolina gubernatorial election was held on November 7, 1916, to select the governor of the state of South Carolina. Governor Richard Irvine Manning III faced a strong challenge from former governor Coleman Livingston Blease in the Democratic primary, but Manning won a second two-year term as governor.

== Democratic primary ==
=== Candidates ===
- Cole L. Blease, former Governor of South Carolina (1911–15)
- Robert Archer Cooper, former State Representative from Laurens and candidate for Governor in 1914
- John M. DesChamps
- John T. Duncan, perennial candidate
- Richard Irvine Manning III, incumbent Governor since 1915

=== Campaign ===
Governor Richard Irvine Manning III ran for a second term, but faced a challenge in the state Democratic primary from former governor Coleman Livingston Blease and Robert Archer Cooper. The progressive reforms initiated by Governor Manning alarmed many of the textile owners who threw their support to Cooper. Blease revived his political coalition of mill workers and sharecroppers and he made political capital out of Manning's use of troops to enforce a court eviction order against strikers at a mill in Anderson. Senator Ben Tillman openly supported the re-election of Governor Manning.

The results of the primary on August 29 had Blease in first place, but just short of a majority necessary to avoid a runoff election. With the elimination of Cooper, the mill executives threw their support to Manning. Indeed, most South Carolinians not already supporting Blease preferred Manning to Blease. Many viewed the election as one of government and misgovernment. Manning eked out a victory in the runoff on September 12 and was essentially elected to a second two-year term because there was nominal opposition in the general election.

=== Results ===
Democratic Primary
Candidate	Votes	%
Coleman Livingston Blease	64,384	46.7
Richard Irvine Manning III	41,536	30.2
Robert Archer Cooper	31,305	22.7
John M. DesChamps	307	0.2
John T. Duncan	269	0.2

=== Runoff results ===
Democratic Primary Runoff
Candidate	Votes	%	±%
Richard Irvine Manning III	71,463	51.7	+21.5
Coleman Livingston Blease	66,791	48.3	+1.6

== General election ==
The general election was held on November 7, 1916, and Richard Irvine Manning III was re-elected governor of South Carolina without opposition. Turnout increased over the previous gubernatorial election because there was also a presidential election on the ballot.

South Carolina Gubernatorial Election, 1916
Party	Candidate	Votes	%	±%
Democratic	Richard Irvine Manning III (incumbent)	60,405	97.91	−1.9
Independent	Coleman Livingston Blease	1,089	1.77	+1.8
Socialist	J.C. Gibbes	163	0.26	+0.1
No party	Write-Ins	38	0.06	0.0
Majority		59,316	96.14	−3.5
Turnout		61,695		
Democratic hold				

== See also ==
- Governor of South Carolina
- List of governors of South Carolina
- South Carolina gubernatorial elections

Preceded by 1914	South Carolina gubernatorial elections	Succeeded by 1918
