= Claudius Cyprian Featherstone =

American lawyer

Claudius Cyprian Featherstone (December 1, 1864 – March 28, 1945) was a lawyer and judge in South Carolina. He was born in Laurens County and educated at the Patrick Military Institute. Afterwards, he undertook the study of law in Anderson where he then practiced law for a year. Featherstone returned to Laurens and practiced law there for over twenty years. While in Laurens on October 10, 1893, Featherstone married Lura Lucretia Pitts. Featherstone entered the 1910 South Carolina gubernatorial contest as the conservative and prohibitionist candidate. He lost the race to Coleman Livingston Blease by just over 5,000 votes because Blease was able to successfully galvanize the textile workers and tenant farmers for his candidacy. In 1911, Featherstone practiced law in Greenwood until 1923 when he was elected to be the judge of the Eighth Judicial Circuit. He served as a judge until his death in 1945.
