= Wilson Godfrey Harvey =

American politician

Wilson Godfrey Harvey Jr.
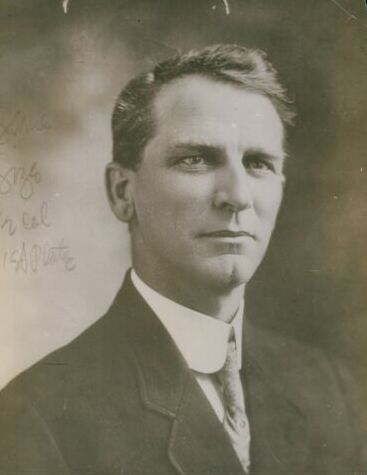
- Harvey in 1922

94th Governor of South Carolina
- In office May 20, 1922 – January 16, 1923
- Lieutenant: Vacant
- Preceded by: Robert Archer Cooper
- Succeeded by: Thomas Gordon McLeod

70th Lieutenant Governor of South Carolina
- In office January 18, 1921 – May 20, 1922
- Governor: Robert Archer Cooper
- Preceded by: Junius T. Liles
- Succeeded by: E. B. Jackson

Personal details
- Born: Wilson Godfrey Harvey; September 8, 1866 Charleston, South Carolina, U.S.
- Died: October 7, 1932 (aged 66) Tampa, Florida, U.S.
- Party: Democratic
- Spouse(s): Mary Franklin Butler; Margaret Waring
- Children: 3
- Profession: Banker, politician

Wilson Godfrey Harvey Jr. (September 8, 1866 – October 7, 1932) was the 94th governor of South Carolina from May 20, 1922, to January 16, 1923.

== Biography ==
Born in Charleston to Wilson Godfrey Harvey (1836–1897) and Cornelia Julia Elbridge Harvey (1840–1925), Harvey attended Charleston High School before dropping out at the age of 16 to work as a clerk in the office of The News and Courier. Five years later he became the manager of another Charleston newspaper, the World and Budget. Showing a penchant for business, Harvey was also involved with the management of Bradstreet Company and the organization of the Enterprise Bank of Charleston. From 1903 to 1911, Harvey served on the Charleston Board of Aldermen and became the Mayor Pro Tempore of Charleston in 1910.

Harvey was elected in 1920 to be the 70th Lieutenant Governor of South Carolina and was elevated to the governorship in 1922 upon the resignation of Governor Robert Archer Cooper. He continued the progressive reforms initiated by former governors Cooper and Richard Irvine Manning III by instigating higher standards in education and by favoring the use of concrete for road construction.

After finishing the term as governor in 1923, Harvey returned to the private sector. He managed a number of insurance companies. Later that same year (1923), he declared bankruptcy after the Enterprise Bank failed; he was tried in 1924 and acquitted on charges of fraud for continuing to accept deposits after he knew of the bank's failure.

== Personal life and death ==
Harvey was married twice. His first wife was Mary Franklin Butler, and they had three children. Following her death, he wed Margaret Bell Waring; they had no children.

He died in Tampa, Florida on October 7, 1932. He was interred in Magnolia Cemetery in Charleston.

Political offices
Preceded by Junius T. Liles	Lieutenant Governor of South Carolina; 1921–1922	Succeeded by E.B. Jackson
Preceded by Robert Archer Cooper	Governor of South Carolina; 1922–1923	Succeeded by Thomas Gordon McLeod
