= David McInnis =

David McInnis may refer to:

- David Lee McInnis (born 1973), American actor
- David Fairly McInnis (1934–2025), American politician in South Carolina
