= Andrew Bethea =

American politician (1879–1945)

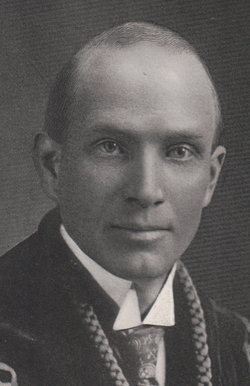
- Bethea in 1920

68th Lieutenant Governor of South Carolina
- In office January 19, 1915 – January 21, 1919
- Governor: Richard Irvine Manning III
- Preceded by: Charles Aurelius Smith
- Succeeded by: Junius T. Liles

Personal details
- Born: Andrew Jackson Bethea; August 17, 1879 Dillon County, South Carolina, US
- Died: December 28, 1945 (aged 66) Orangeburg, South Carolina, US
- Party: Democratic
- Occupation: Politician
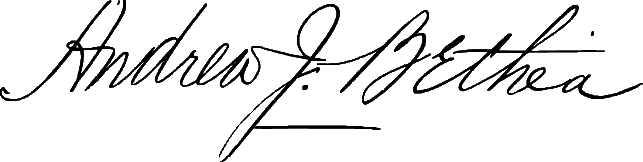
- Signature

Andrew Jackson Bethea (August 17, 1879 – December 28, 1945) was an American politician. A Democrat, he was the Lieutenant Governor of South Carolina, under Richard Irvine Manning III.

Born in Marion County, South Carolina, Bethea worked as a schoolteacher as a young adult. He served as Lieutenant Governor, later losing elections to other offices. He volunteered to fight in World War I. He died in a car accident.

== Early life and education ==
Bethea was born on August 17, 1879 in the Bethea Township of Marion County, South Carolina, though the area where he was born is now part of Dillon County. His father was Andrew J. Bethea (died 1881), a planter and physician in the American Civil War. His mother was Annie M. Bethea (née Allen; 1843–1919), who was the daughter of Baptist minister Joel Allen.

Bethea grew up on a farm. He had four siblings: two brothers and two sisters. After the death of his father, his mother raised he and his siblings. He was educated at schools in Centerville and Dalcho. He studied at Wake Forest College, receiving a Bachelor of Arts in 1902, then a Master of Arts in 1904. He also attended the University of Tennessee in 1905 and received another Master of Arts in 1910, from the University of South Carolina.

== Career ==
In 1907, Bethea moved to Columbia. Around this time, he served as the principal of schools in Beech Island, Camden, and Hopkins. He was the editor and publisher of the News and Press for a time. From January 1907 to 1911, he was the private secretary of Governor Martin Frederick Ansel. The South Carolina Supreme Court admitted him to the bar in December 1910.

Bethea was a Democrat. From 1911 to 1915, he was the state Code Commissioner, as which he created the 1912 state statutes. He was Lieutenant Governor of South Carolina from January 19, 1915, to January 21, 1919, serving under Richard Irvine Manning III. He was presumably the youngest Lieutenant Governor in South Carolina history at the time. In his second campaign for Lieutenant Governor, he won what was then the largest landslide victory in South Carolina electoral history. He unsuccessfully ran for Governor in 1918, as well as for South Carolina's 7th district of the United States House of Representatives in 1922, and the 2nd district in 1938. Politically, he opposed women's suffrage.

Bethea was an inaugural member of the South Carolina State Reserve Militia. In 1917, he enlisted into the United States Army to volunteer in World War I. In 1918, he received his United States Army Basic Training between Fort Belvoir and Joint Base McGuire-Dix-Lakehurst. After completing training, he was commissioned as a major. However, in early February 1919, newspapers claimed that he was not promoted, and that he instead dressed as a major while his unit was inactive. On February 14, he sued the Columbia Record for $100,000 for the claims.

== Personal life and death ==
Bethea was a Baptist, having been a deacon of the First Baptist Church and a trustee of the South Carolina Baptist Hospital. He was also a trustee of the Southern Baptist Theological Seminary. He was a member of the Benevolent and Protective Order of Elks, the Freemasons, the Independent Order of Odd Fellows, the Junior Order of United American Mechanics, the Knights of Pythias, and the Woodmen of the World. He was married to Nellie (née DeTreville) Bethea.

On December 28, 1945, Bethea got in a car accident near Elloree. He was in the car with several members of the Odd Fellows, on their way to a meeting. The car had tried to avoid another car that was driving the wrong way and drove into a swamp as a result. Bethea died hours later, aged 66, at the The Regional Medical Center in Orangeburg. Businessman Arthur U. Adams also died in the accident. An archive of Bethea's papers is held by the Greenville County Public Library.
