= Smith-Cannon House =

Historic house in South Carolina, United States

- U.S. National Register of Historic Places
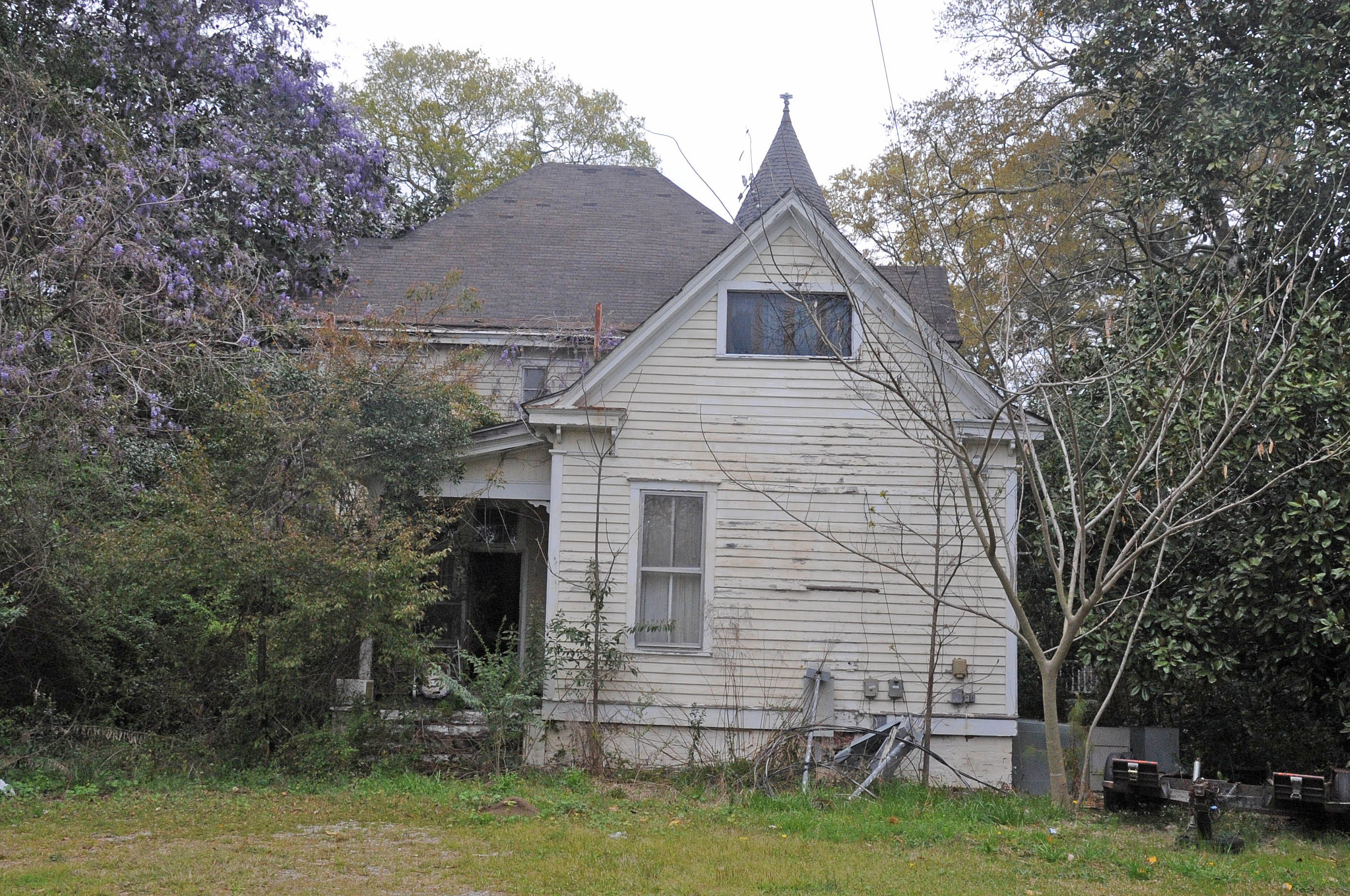
- Rear of the house

- Location within South Carolina Location within the United States
- Location: 106 W. Market St., Timmonsville, South Carolina
- Coordinates: 34°8′5″N 79°56′35″W
- Area: 1.8 acres (0.73 ha)
- Built: c. 1897-1900
- Architectural style: Queen Anne
- NRHP reference No.: 83002195
- Added to NRHP: July 28, 1983

Smith-Cannon House, also known as the B.O.V.B. (Big Old Victorian Barn), is a historic home located at Timmonsville, Florence County, South Carolina. It was built about 1897–1900, and is a two-story, asymmetrical plan house in the Queen Anne style. It has a full attic and is sheathed in weatherboard. The house features a 2 1/2-story round turret; a one-story, shed roofed porch that stretches across the entire façade, wraps the turret, and extends to form a porte-cochère. It was built for Charles Aurelius Smith, prominent government figure as mayor of Timmonsville, member of the state house of representatives, twice lieutenant governor, and governor of South Carolina for five days.

It was listed on the National Register of Historic Places in 1983.

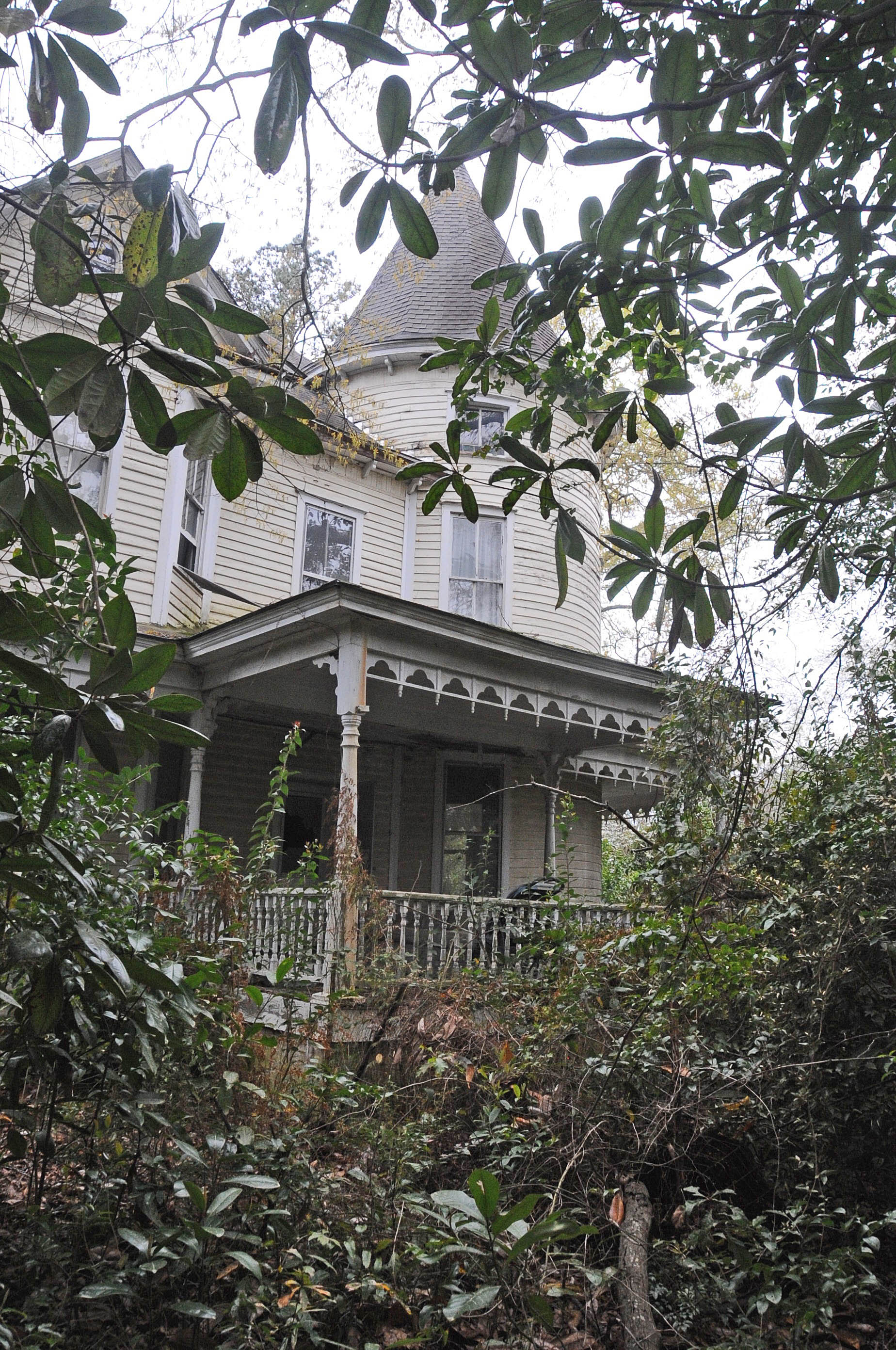
Front of the house showing the turret
