= Junius T. Liles =

American politician (1876–1947)

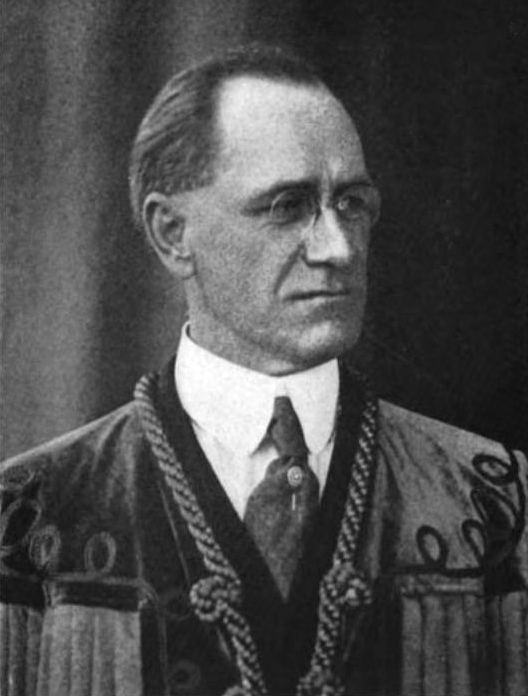

69th Lieutenant Governor of South Carolina
- In office January 21, 1919 – January 18, 1921
- Governor: Robert Archer Cooper
- Preceded by: Andrew Bethea
- Succeeded by: Wilson Godfrey Harvey

Personal details
- Born: August 24, 1876; Lilesville, North Carolina, US
- Died: March 1, 1947 (aged 70); Orangeburg, South Carolina, US
- Political party: Democratic
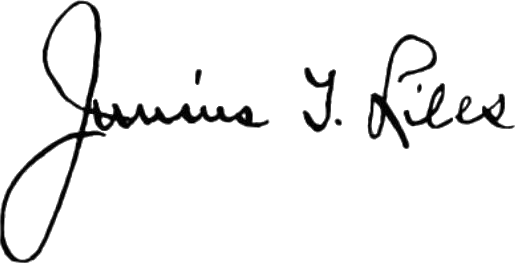
- Signature

Junius T. Liles (1876–1947) was an American politician who served as the 69th lieutenant governor of South Carolina. He was born in Lilesville, North Carolina.

== Career ==
Junius Liles attended both public and private schools. At the age of 17, he enrolled at the University of North Carolina. Because of financial problems, he was only able to stay for a year. He then worked as a bank clerk and salesman in Marion for two and a half years. He then began studying at Willmon College in Kentucky, but dropped out at the outbreak of the Spanish-American War of 1898 to join a Kentucky volunteer unit. From 1901 he worked in the insurance business for the rest of his non-political life. He must have also settled in South Carolina during those years.

Liles was a member of the Democratic Party. In 1918 he was elected lieutenant governor of South Carolina alongside Robert Archer Cooper. He held this office between 1919 and 1921. He only served one term. He died in Orangeburg on March 1, 1947.

Political offices
Preceded by Andrew Bethea	Lieutenant Governor of South Carolina; 1919–1921	Succeeded by Wilson Godfrey Harvey
