= 1912 South Carolina gubernatorial election =

1912 South Carolina Democratic gubernatorial primary
- August 27, 1912
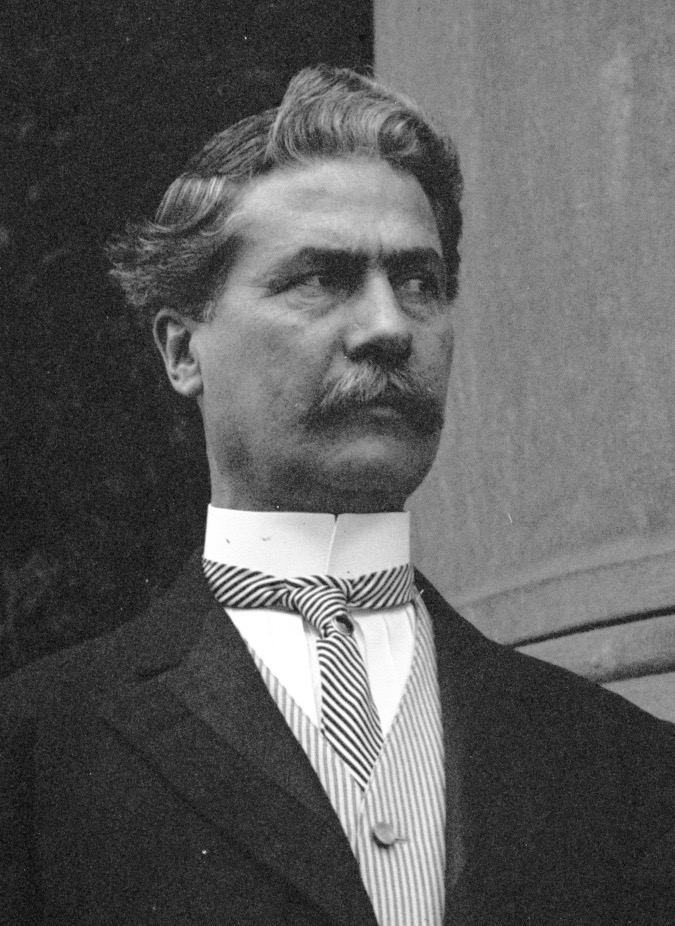

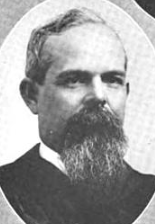
Candidate	Cole Blease	Ira B. Jones
Party	Democratic	Democratic
Popular vote	71,552	66,478
Percentage	50.96%	47.34%
Governor of South Carolina before election
Cole Blease
Democrat
Elected Governor of South Carolina
Cole Blease
Democrat

The 1912 South Carolina gubernatorial election was held on November 5, 1912, to select the governor of the state of South Carolina. Governor Coleman Livingston Blease won the Democratic primary. As South Carolina was dominated by the Democratic Party, he faced no significant opposition in the general election.

== Democratic primary ==
=== Candidates ===
- Cole L. Blease, incumbent Governor since 1911
- John T. Duncan, candidate for Governor in 1910
- Ira B. Jones, Chief Justice of the South Carolina Supreme Court

=== Campaign ===
Governor Coleman Livingston Blease ran for a second term, but he faced a credible challenge in the state Democratic primary against Ira B. Jones. Senator Ben Tillman felt that Blease had greatly damaged the reputation of the state and was morally unfit to be governor, but because his re-election was on the same ballot he feared to openly oppose Blease so as to cause his own political downfall. Nevertheless, Tillman published a letter at the last minute stating his opposition to Blease. It was rather ironic because Tillman was essentially aiding the very people he had opposed in his 1890 gubernatorial contest. Despite Tillman's objection, Blease won the primary election on August 27 and avoided a runoff election by obtaining more than 50 percent of the vote.

=== Results ===
Democratic Primary
Candidate	Votes	%
Coleman Livingston Blease	71,552	51.0
Ira B. Jones	66,478	47.3
John T. Duncan	2,385	1.7

== General election ==
The general election was held on November 5, 1912, when Coleman Livingston Blease was officially re-elected governor of South Carolina. Turnout increased over the previous gubernatorial election because there was also a presidential election on the ballot.

South Carolina Gubernatorial Election, 1912
Party	Candidate	Votes	%	±%
Democratic	Coleman Livingston Blease (incumbent)	44,122	99.53	−0.3
Socialist	R.B. Britton	208	0.47	+0.3
Majority		43,914	99.06	−1.0
Turnout		44,330		
Democratic hold				

65+% won by Blease

== See also ==
- Governor of South Carolina
- List of governors of South Carolina
- South Carolina gubernatorial elections

Preceded by 1910	South Carolina gubernatorial elections	Succeeded by 1914
