= 1930 United States Senate election in South Carolina =

1930 Democratic Senate primary runoff in South Carolina
- September 9, 1930
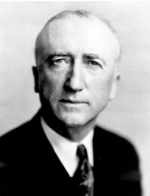

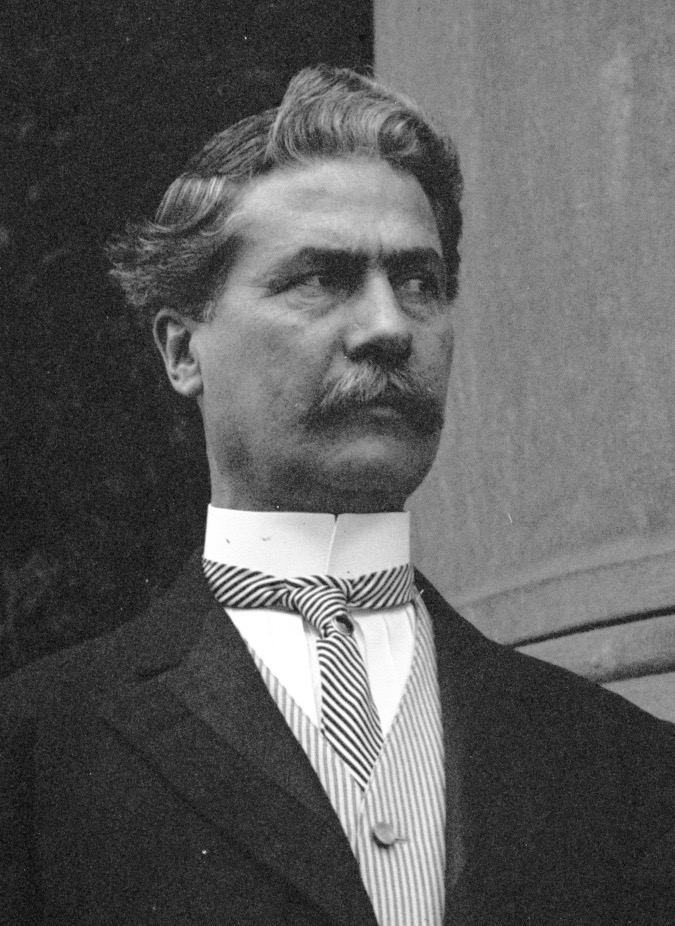
Nominee	James F. Byrnes	Cole Blease
Party	Democratic	Democratic
Popular vote	120,755	116,264
Percentage	50.95%	49.05%
- County results Byrnes: 50–60% 60–70% 70–80% Blease: 50–60% 60–70%
U.S. senator before election
Coleman Livingston Blease
Democratic
Elected U.S. Senator
James F. Byrnes
Democratic

The 1930 South Carolina United States Senate election was held on November 4, 1930, to select the U.S. Senator from the state of South Carolina. Incumbent Democratic Senator Coleman Livingston Blease was defeated in the Democratic primary by James F. Byrnes. He was unopposed in the general election to win a six-year term.

== Democratic primary ==
=== Candidates ===
- Cole Blease, incumbent Senator since 1925
- James F. Byrnes, former U.S. Representative from Charleston and candidate for U.S. Senate in 1924
- Leon W. Harris

=== Campaign ===
Senator Coleman Livingston Blease was opposed in the Democratic primary by former Representative James F. Byrnes. Blease was the leader in the first primary election on August 26, but in previous primary elections he had been the leader in the first primary and unable to increase his support in the runoff election. This election was no different and Byrnes won the runoff on September 9. There was no opposition to the Democratic candidate in the general election so Byrnes was elected to a six-year term in the Senate.

=== Results ===
Democratic Primary
Candidate	Votes	%
Coleman Livingston Blease	111,989	46.0
James F. Byrnes	92,242	37.8
Leon W. Harris	39,512	16.2

=== Runoff ===
Democratic Primary Runoff
Candidate	Votes	%	±%
James F. Byrnes	120,755	50.9	+13.1
Coleman Livingston Blease	116,264	49.1	+3.1

== General election ==
=== Results ===
1930 U.S. Senate election in South Carolina
Party	Candidate	Votes	%	±%
Democratic	James F. Byrnes	16,211	100.0	0.0
Majority		16,211	100.0	0.0
Turnout		16,211		
Democratic hold				

65+% won by Byrnes

== See also ==
- List of United States senators from South Carolina
- 1930 United States Senate elections
- 1930 United States House of Representatives elections in South Carolina
- 1930 South Carolina gubernatorial election
