= Mendel L. Smith =

Speaker of the South Carolina House of Representatives from 1912 to 1918

Mendel Lafayette Smith (1870 ‍–‍ 1934) was a politician and judge in South Carolina who served as Speaker of the South Carolina House of Representatives from 1903 to 1907 and 1912 until 1915. He served as a Judge of the Fifth Judicial Circuit of South Carolina until 1918. He ran for the office of the Governor of South Carolina in 1914.

== Early life ==
He was born in Smithville, South Carolina—at the time located in Sumter County, later part of Lee County—to Lafayette M. Smith, a merchant and planter, and Medora née Bradley Smith. His father was the eldest of Mendel Smith's four children .

He attended graded school in Camden, South Carolina and Wofford College. He then attended South Carolina Military Academy and the University of Virginia's law course. He played baseball and served as president of the South Carolina State League.

== Career ==
He joined the Virginia bar in 1894 and the South Carolina bar the following year. He served on the board of educational institutions and commissions and was involved with the Democratic Party. He was elected to the South Carolina House of Representatives from Kershaw County in 1900. He went on to serve numerous terms, including as Speaker.

== See also ==
- 1914 South Carolina gubernatorial election
