= 1924 United States Senate election in South Carolina =

1924 Democratic Senate primary runoff in South Carolina
- September 9, 1924
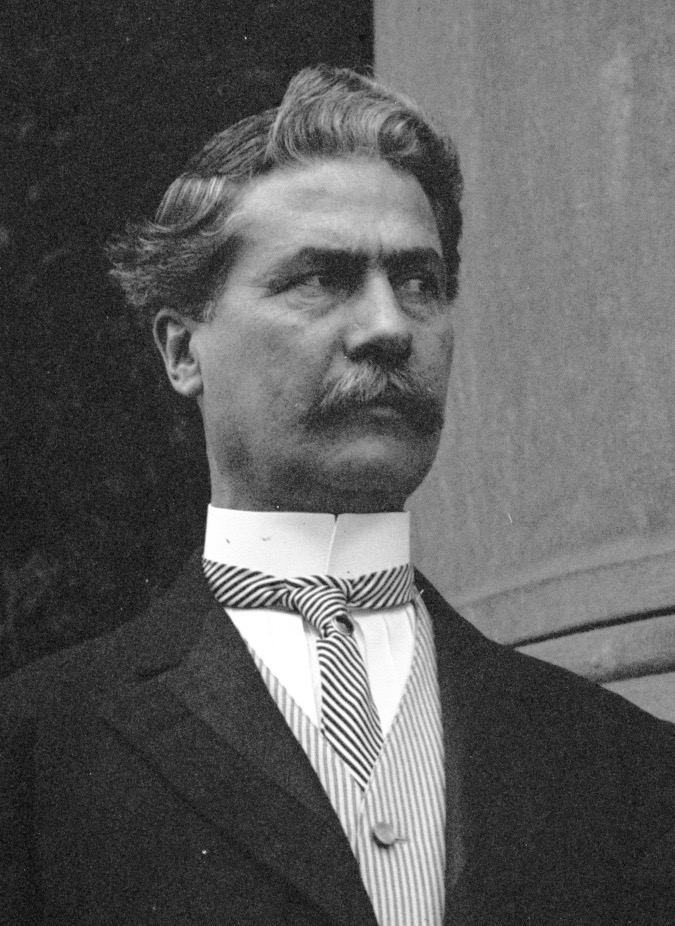

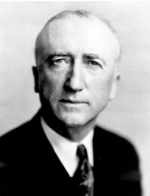
| Nominee | Cole Blease | James F. Byrnes |
| Party | Democratic | Democratic |
| Popular vote | 100,738 | 98,467 |
| Percentage | 50.57% | 49.43% |
- Results by county Blease: 50–60% 60–70% Byrnes: 50–60% 60–70% 70–80%
U.S. senator before election
Nathaniel B. Dial
Democratic
Elected U.S. Senator
Coleman Livingston Blease
Democratic

The 1924 South Carolina United States Senate election was held on November 4, 1924, to select the U.S. Senator for a six-year term from the state of South Carolina. Coleman Livingston Blease won the Democratic primary and was unopposed in the general election to win the six-year term to the Senate.

== Democratic primary ==
=== Candidates ===
- Coleman Livingston Blease, former Governor of South Carolina and candidate for U.S. Senate in 1914 and 1918
- James F. Byrnes, U.S. Representative from Charleston
- Nathaniel B. Dial, incumbent Senator since 1919
- John McMahan

=== Results ===
Democratic Primary
| Candidate | Votes | % |
|---|---|---|
| Coleman Livingston Blease | 83,738 | 41.8 |
| James F. Byrnes | 67,727 | 33.8 |
| Nathaniel B. Dial (incumbent) | 44,425 | 22.2 |
| John J. McMahan | 4,530 | 2.2 |

Democratic Primary Runoff
| Candidate | Votes | % | ±% |
|---|---|---|---|
| Coleman Livingston Blease | 100,738 | 50.6 | +8.8 |
| James F. Byrnes | 98,467 | 49.4 | +15.6 |

== General election ==
=== Results ===
General Election results Blease: 100% No Vote

1924 U.S. Senate election in South Carolina
| Party | Candidate | Votes | % | ±% |
|---|---|---|---|---|
| Democratic | Coleman Livingston Blease | 49,060 | 100.0 | 0.0 |
| Majority | | 49,060 | 100.0 | 0.0 |
| Turnout | | 49,060 | | |
| Democratic hold | | | | |

== See also ==
- List of United States senators from South Carolina
- 1924 United States Senate elections
- 1924 United States House of Representatives elections in South Carolina
- 1924 South Carolina gubernatorial election
