= 1910 South Carolina gubernatorial election =

1910 South Carolina Democratic gubernatorial primary runoff
- September 13, 1910
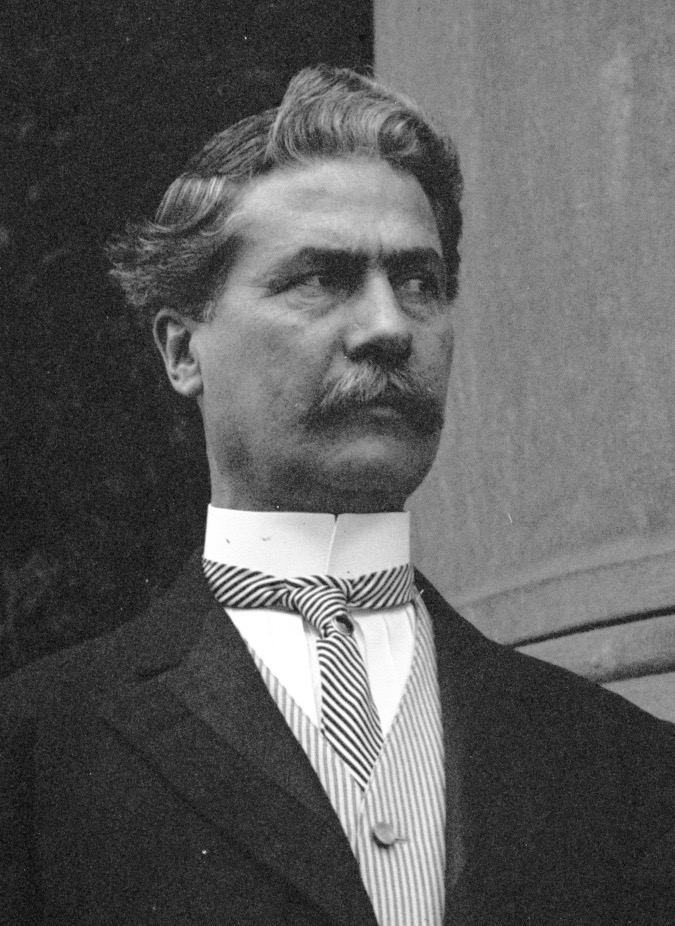

Candidate	Cole Blease	C. C. Featherstone
Party	Democratic	Democratic
Popular vote	56,250	50,605
Percentage	52.64%	47.36%
Governor of South Carolina before election
Martin Frederick Ansel
Democratic
Elected Governor of South Carolina
Coleman Livingston Blease
Democratic

The 1910 South Carolina gubernatorial election was held on November 8, 1910, to select the governor of the state of South Carolina. Coleman Livingston Blease won the Democratic primary and ran unopposed in the general election to become the 90th governor of South Carolina.

== Democratic primary ==
=== Candidates ===
- Cole L. Blease, State Senator from Newberry
- John T. Duncan
- Claudius Cyprian Featherstone, Laurens County attorney
- F.H. Hyatt
- Thomas Gordon McLeod, Lieutenant Governor of South Carolina
- John Gardiner Richards, Jr., State Representative from Liberty Hill, Kershaw County

By 1910, the South Carolina Democratic Party had split into two factions: the well-to-do farmers with ties to Clemson College, and the tenant farmers who largely did not benefit from many of the proposals instituted by Benjamin Tillman and his followers. Many of these poor farmers escaped the fields to the relative prosperity of a mill town. Coleman Livingston Blease, a lawyer from Newberry, sought to portray himself as the candidate for the downtrodden and oppressed white man who had not benefited from the Tillman era. Blease and prohibitionist candidate Claudius Cyprian Featherstone emerged as the front runners in the Democratic primary on August 30. Featherstone and his conservative allies attacked Blease for his coarse behavior, similar to A.C. Haskell's attacks on Tillman in the gubernatorial election of 1890, but once again the attacks only strengthened the candidacy of the antagonist. On September 13, Blease won by just over 5,000 votes in the runoff to essentially become the next governor of South Carolina because there was no opposition in the general election.

=== Results ===
Democratic Primary
Candidate	Votes	%
Coleman Livingston Blease	33,411	31.7
Claudius Cyprian Featherstone	30,045	28.5
Thomas Gordon McLeod	25,263	24.0
John Gardiner Richards, Jr.	9,770	9.3
F.H. Hyatt	5,436	5.1
John T. Duncan	1,436	1.4

=== Runoff results ===
Democratic Primary Runoff
Candidate	Votes	%	±%
Coleman Livingston Blease	56,250	52.6	+20.9
Claudius Cyprian Featherstone	50,605	47.4	+18.9

== General election ==
The general election was held on November 8, 1910, and Coleman Livingston Blease was elected the next governor of South Carolina without opposition. Being a non-presidential election and few contested races, turnout was much less than the previous gubernatorial election.

South Carolina Gubernatorial Election, 1910
Party	Candidate	Votes	%	±%
Democratic	Coleman Livingston Blease	30,832	99.77	−0.2
Socialist	F. N. U. Thompson	70	0.23	+0.2
Majority		30,762	99.55	
Turnout		30,902		
Democratic hold				

65+% won by Blease

== See also ==
- Governor of South Carolina
- List of governors of South Carolina
- South Carolina gubernatorial elections

Preceded by 1908	South Carolina gubernatorial elections	Succeeded by 1912
