= 1920 South Carolina gubernatorial election =

- November 2, 1920
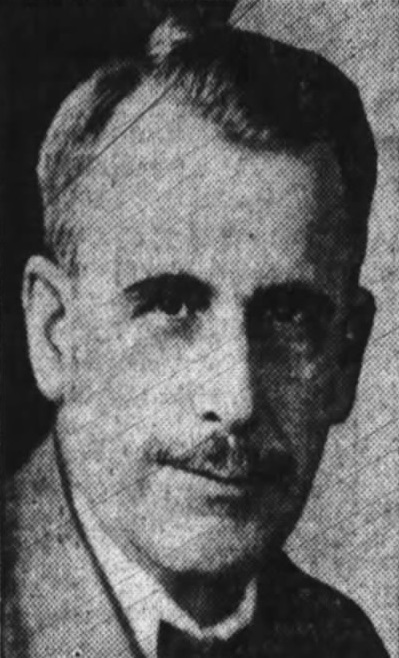
Nominee	Robert Archer Cooper
Party	Democratic
Popular vote	58,050
Percentage	100.00%
- County Results; Cooper: 100%
Governor before election
Robert Archer Cooper
Democratic
Elected Governor
Robert Archer Cooper
Democratic

The 1920 South Carolina gubernatorial election was held on November 2, 1920, to select the governor of the state of South Carolina. Governor Robert Archer Cooper faced no opposition in the Democratic primary nor the general election to win a second two-year term as governor.

== Democratic primary ==
Governor Robert Archer Cooper faced no opposition from South Carolina Democrats and avoided a primary election.

== General election ==
The general election was held on November 2, 1920, and Robert Archer Cooper was reelected governor of South Carolina without opposition. Turnout increased over the previous gubernatorial election because there was also a presidential election on the ballot.

South Carolina Gubernatorial Election, 1920
Party	Candidate	Votes	%	±%
Democratic	Robert Archer Cooper (incumbent)	58,050	100.00	0.0
Majority		58,050	100.00	0.0
Turnout		58,050		
Democratic hold				

65+% won by Cooper

== See also ==
- Governor of South Carolina
- List of governors of South Carolina
- South Carolina gubernatorial elections

Preceded by 1918	South Carolina gubernatorial elections	Succeeded by 1922
