= Timmonsville, South Carolina =

- Town
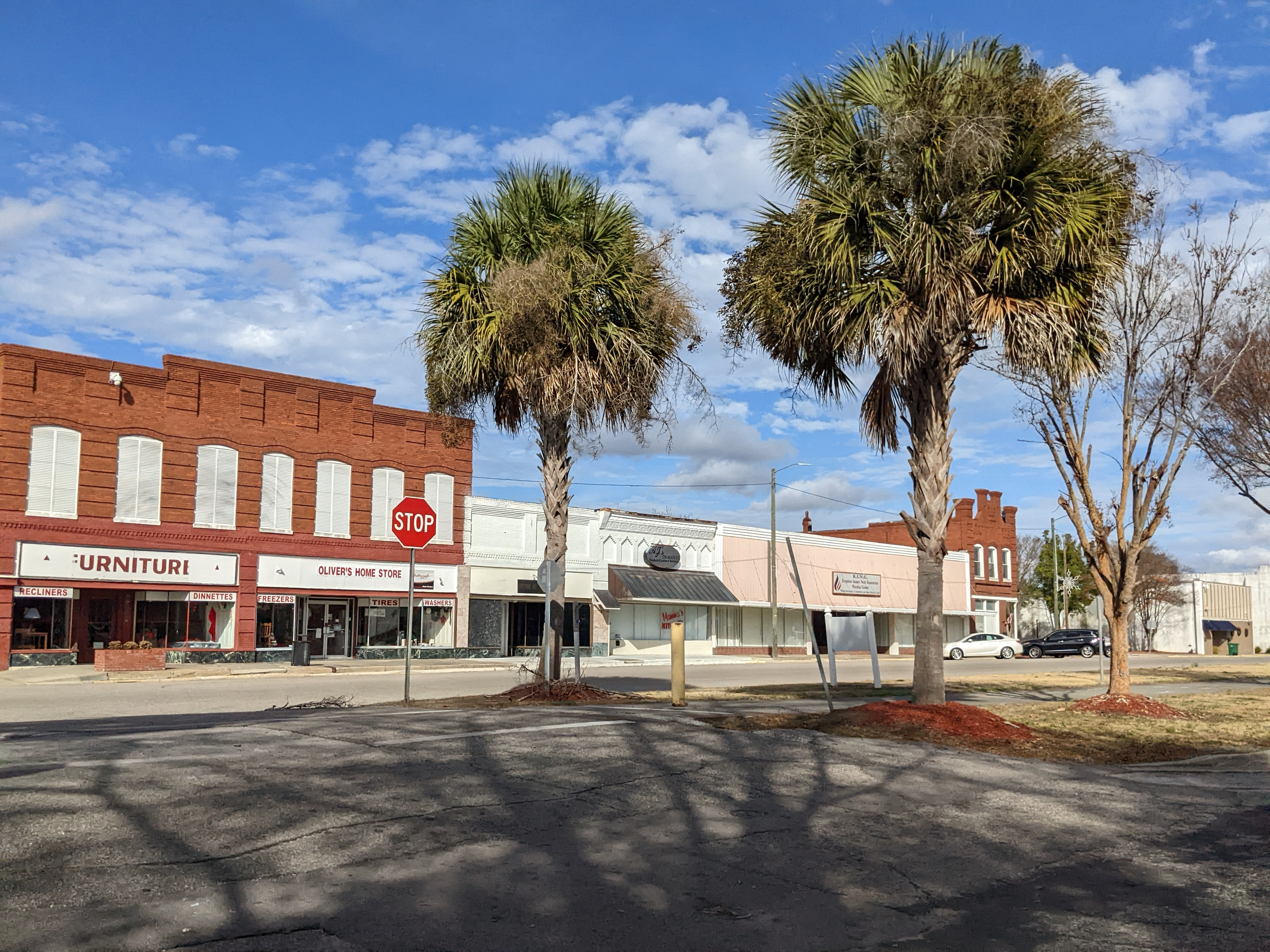
- Downtown Timmonsville

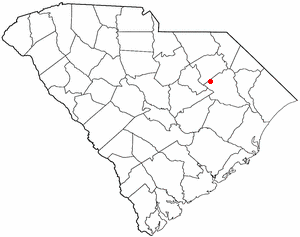
- Location of Timmonsville in South Carolina
- Coordinates: 34°07′48″N 79°56′22″W
- Country: United States
- State: South Carolina
- County: Florence
- Founder: John Morgan Timmons

Area
  - Total: 2.78 sq mi (7.19 km^{2})
  - Land: 2.78 sq mi (7.19 km^{2})
  - Water: 0 sq mi (0.00 km^{2})
- Elevation: 151 ft (46 m)

Population (2020)
  - Total: 2,099
  - Density: 755.9/sq mi (291.85/km^{2})
- Time zone: UTC−5 (EST)
  - Summer (DST): UTC−4 (EDT)
- ZIP Code: 29161
- Area codes: 843, 854
- FIPS code: 45-71980
- GNIS feature ID: 2406736
- Website: www.timmonsvillesc.org

Timmonsville is a town in Florence County, South Carolina, United States. As of the 2020 census, Timmonsville had a population of 2,099. It is part of the Florence Metropolitan Statistical Area.

== History ==
Timmonsville was founded in 1854 by John Morgan Timmons, a Baptist minister of French Huguenot ancestry.

The Smith-Cannon House was listed on the National Register of Historic Places in 1983.

In 2016 the municipal government passed an ordinance banning people from having sagging pants, with a fine of $600. It is known as Ordinance 543.

== Geography ==
According to the United States Census Bureau, the town has a total area of 2.6 square miles (6.7 km^{2}), all land.

== Demographics ==
Historical population
| Census | Pop. | Note | %± |
|---|---|---|---|
| 1870 | 477 | | — |
| 1880 | 557 | | 16.8% |
| 1890 | 516 | | −7.4% |
| 1900 | 861 | | 66.9% |
| 1910 | 1,708 | | 98.4% |
| 1920 | 1,860 | | 8.9% |
| 1930 | 1,919 | | 3.2% |
| 1940 | 1,979 | | 3.1% |
| 1950 | 2,001 | | 1.1% |
| 1960 | 2,178 | | 8.8% |
| 1970 | 2,246 | | 3.1% |
| 1980 | 2,112 | | −6.0% |
| 1990 | 2,182 | | 3.3% |
| 2000 | 2,315 | | 6.1% |
| 2010 | 2,320 | | 0.2% |
| 2020 | 2,099 | | −9.5% |
U.S. Decennial Census

=== 2020 census ===
Timmonsville town, South Carolina – Racial and ethnic composition Note: the US Census treats Hispanic/Latino as an ethnic category. This table excludes Latinos from the racial categories and assigns them to a separate category. Hispanics/Latinos may be of any race.
| Race / Ethnicity (NH = Non-Hispanic) | Pop 2000 | Pop 2010 | Pop 2020 | % 2000 | % 2010 | % 2020 |
|---|---|---|---|---|---|---|
| White alone (NH) | 499 | 376 | 235 | 21.56% | 16.21% | 11.20% |
| Black or African American alone (NH) | 1,782 | 1,889 | 1,771 | 76.98% | 81.42% | 84.37% |
| Native American or Alaska Native alone (NH) | 9 | 4 | 4 | 0.39% | 0.17% | 0.19% |
| Asian alone (NH) | 2 | 14 | 4 | 0.09% | 0.60% | 0.19% |
| Native Hawaiian or Pacific Islander alone (NH) | 1 | 0 | 1 | 0.04% | 0.00% | 0.05% |
| Other race alone (NH) | 0 | 0 | 3 | 0.00% | 0.00% | 0.14% |
| Mixed race or Multiracial (NH) | 3 | 8 | 53 | 0.13% | 0.34% | 2.53% |
| Hispanic or Latino (any race) | 19 | 29 | 28 | 0.82% | 1.25% | 1.33% |
| Total | 2,315 | 2,320 | 2,099 | 100.00% | 100.00% | 100.00% |

As of the census of 2000, there were 2,315 people, 829 households, and 596 families residing in the town. The population density was 896.6 inhabitants per square mile (346.2/km^{2}). There were 956 housing units at an average density of 370.2 per square mile (142.9/km^{2}). The racial makeup of the town was 21.94% White, 77.32% Black, 0.39% Native American, 0.09% Asian, 0.04% Pacific Islander, 0.09% from other races, and 0.13% from two or more races. Hispanic or Latino of any race were 0.82% of the population.

There were 829 households, out of which 32.6% had children under the age of 18 living with them, 35.9% were married couples living together, 31.7% had a female householder with no husband present, and 28.0% were non-families. Of all households 24.0% were made up of individuals, and 10.0% had someone living alone who was 65 years of age or older. The average household size was 2.76 and the average family size was 3.27.

In the town, the population was spread out, with 28.3% under the age of 18, 10.5% from 18 to 24, 26.5% from 25 to 44, 21.1% from 45 to 64, and 13.7% who were 65 years of age or older. The median age was 34 years. For every 100 females, there were 79.3 males. For every 100 females age 18 and over, there were 71.1 males.

The median income for a household in the town was $23,514, and the median income for a family was $29,213. Males had a median income of $23,500 versus $16,588 for females. The per capita income for the town was $11,714. About 25.5% of families and 26.6% of the population were below the poverty line, including 34.1% of those under age 18 and 23.1% of those age 65 or over.

== Government and infrastructure ==
In 2012 the police force was disbanded due to lack of funds. It was revived in 2014, and Gregory Palmer was appointed chief of police. In 2016, Palmer was dismissed by Mayor Darrick Jackson, who had reportedly lost confidence in him.

== Economy ==
The Honda Motor Company manufactures all-terrain vehicles (ATVs) and multi-use SxS (side-by-side) vehicles in Timmonsville. Manufactured there are Four Trax Recon, Four Trax Foreman, Four Trax Rancher, Four Trax Rincon, Four Trax Rubicon, Sportrax 400EX/250EX, Pioneer 500, Pioneer 700, and the Pioneer 1000.

The Florence Motor Speedway is also located in Timmonsville. Following the closure of the Myrtle Beach Speedway in the same market, promoters acquired Florence Motor Speedway from the Powell family, moving the entire operation to the .400-mile circuit, built in 1982, where it is an active NASCAR Advance Auto Parts Weekly Series circuit. Florence hosts the Icebreaker, CARS Tours, and Myrtle Beach 400 big-money events in addition to the regular club racing schedule.

== Education ==
Public education in Timmonsville is administered by Florence Public School District One, following the absorption of District 4 by District 1. Students continue to attend Brockington Elementary School in Timmonsville, but high school students are now served by West Florence High School or South Florence High School. Johnson Middle School and Timmonsville High School, which were part of a unified campus with Brockington Elementary, were both closed as part of the merger.

Timmonsville has a public library, a branch of the Florence County Library System.

== Notable people ==
- John Abraham (born 1978), NFL player
- Kent Anderson (born 1963), baseball player lived in Timmonsville
- David Fairly McInnis (born 1934), politician
- Melvin Purvis (1903–1960), FBI agent
- J. Willard Ragsdale (1872–1919), U.S. Representative from South Carolina
- Ernest Shahid (1921–2008), Florida real estate developer
- Charles Aurelius Smith (1861–1916), 91st Governor of South Carolina
- Cale Yarborough (1939–2023), three-time NASCAR Cup Champion

== See also ==
- List of towns in South Carolina
