= David Fairley McInnis =

American politician (1934–2025)

David Fairly McInnis

Member of the South Carolina House of Representatives from the 69th district
- In office 1975–1982

Personal details
- Born: August 5, 1934 Timmonsville, South Carolina, U.S.
- Died: July 22, 2025 (aged 90) Sumter, South Carolina, U.S.
- Occupation: Lawyer, judge

David Fairly McInnis (August 5, 1934 – July 22, 2025) was an American politician in the state of South Carolina. He served in the South Carolina House of Representatives from 1975 to 1982, representing Sumter County, South Carolina. He was a lawyer and judge. He served on the South Carolina Circuit Court as a judge on the third circuit.

McInnis died on July 22, 2025, at the age of 90.
