= News and Press =

South Carolina newspaper

- Type: Weekly newspaper
- Founded: 1875
- Headquarters: Darlington County, South Carolina
- Circulation: 6,200
- Website: newsandpress.net

The News and Press is a local newspaper serving Darlington County, South Carolina. It is currently published in print and online.

== History ==
The Darlington News was established in 1875 as a weekly, publishing on Thursdays. In 1908 it was consolidated with the Darlington Press, under the new name News and Press.
