= Thomas Gordon McLeod =

American politician

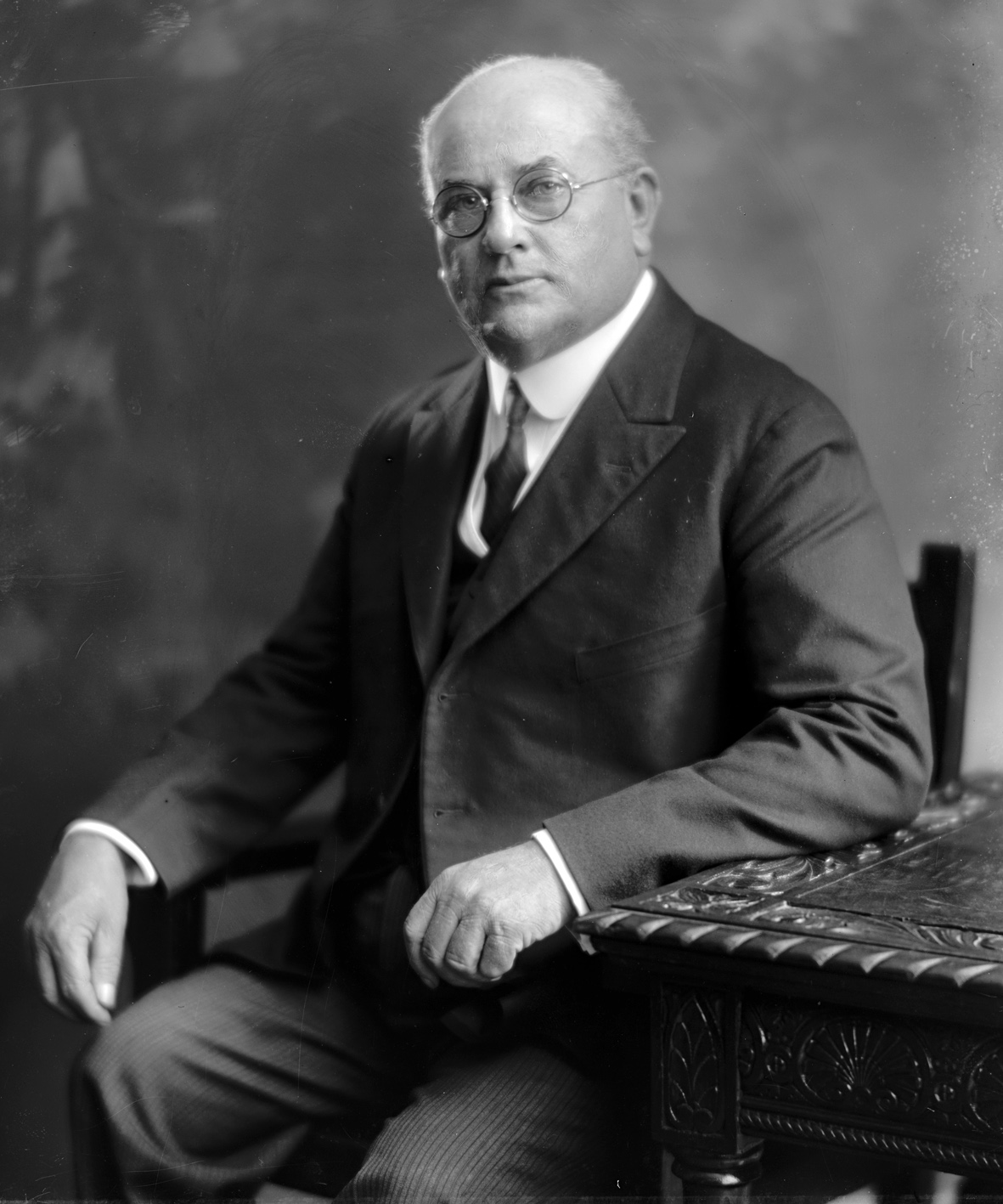

95th Governor of South Carolina
- In office January 16, 1923 – January 18, 1927
- Lieutenant: E. B. Jackson
- Preceded by: Wilson Godfrey Harvey
- Succeeded by: John Gardiner Richards, Jr.

66th Lieutenant Governor of South Carolina
- In office January 15, 1907 – January 17, 1911
- Governor: Martin Frederick Ansel
- Preceded by: John Sloan
- Succeeded by: Charles Aurelius Smith

Member of the South Carolina Senate from Lee County
- In office January 13, 1903 – January 8, 1907
- Preceded by: Constituency established
- Succeeded by: B. Franklin Kelley

Member of the South Carolina House of Representatives from Sumter County
- In office January 8, 1901 – January 13, 1903

Personal details
- Born: Thomas Gordon McLeod; December 17, 1868 Lynchburg, South Carolina, U.S.
- Died: December 11, 1932 (aged 63) Bishopville, South Carolina, U.S.
- Party: Democratic
- Spouse: Elizabeth Alford
- Children: 4
- Education: Wofford College
- Profession: Lawyer, politician

Thomas Gordon McLeod (December 17, 1868 – December 11, 1932) was an American attorney and the 95th governor of South Carolina from 1923 to 1927.

== Biography ==
Born in Lynchburg, South Carolina to William J. McLeod, a former captain in the Confederate Army, and Amanda McMillan Rogers McLeod, he attended Lynchburg Academy and graduated from Wofford College and the University of Virginia Law School.

His political career began when he was elected to the South Carolina House of Representatives in 1900. He became the first state senator from the newly formed Lee County in 1902. In 1906, he was elected the 66th lieutenant governor of South Carolina and re-elected in 1908. In the 1922 gubernatorial election, McLeod won a Democratic primary runoff against former Governor Cole Blease, effectively becoming the 95th governor of South Carolina. Re-elected in 1924, McLeod served as governor until his term expired in 1927.

Upon leaving office he became the president of the Bishopville Telephone Company. He died on December 11, 1932, in Bishopville and is buried in the Bishopville Methodist Churchyard.

Party political offices
Preceded by Robert Archer Cooper	Democratic nominee for Governor of South Carolina; 1922, 1924	Succeeded by John Gardiner Richards Jr.
Political offices
Preceded by John Sloan	Lieutenant Governor of South Carolina; 1907–1911	Succeeded by Charles A. Smith
Preceded by Wilson Godfrey Harvey	Governor of South Carolina; 1923–1927	Succeeded by John Gardiner Richards, Jr.
