= Charles Aurelius Smith =

American politician

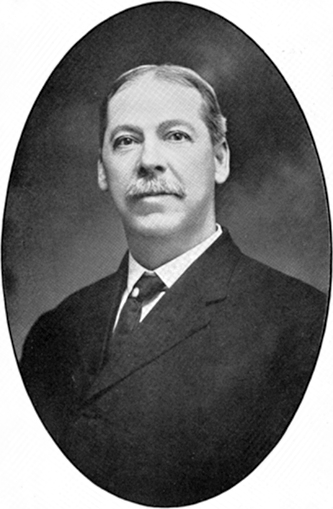

91st Governor of South Carolina
- In office January 14, 1915 – January 19, 1915
- Lieutenant: Vacant
- Preceded by: Coleman Livingston Blease
- Succeeded by: Richard Irvine Manning III

67th Lieutenant Governor of South Carolina
- In office January 17, 1911 – January 14, 1915
- Governor: Coleman Livingston Blease
- Preceded by: Thomas Gordon McLeod
- Succeeded by: Andrew Bethea

Member of the South Carolina House of Representatives from the Florence County district
- In office January 12, 1909 – January 10, 1911

Personal details
- Born: January 22, 1861 Hertford County, North Carolina, U.S.
- Died: April 1, 1916 (aged 55) Baltimore, Maryland, U.S.
- Party: Democratic
- Spouse: Fannie L. Byrd
- Education: Wake Forest University
- Profession: Businessman, Banker

Charles Aurelius Smith (January 22, 1861 – April 1, 1916) was the 91st governor of South Carolina from January 14 to January 19, 1915. His term of five days stands as the shortest for any governor in South Carolina.

== Biography ==
Born on January 22, 1861, in Hertford County, North Carolina, Smith attended Wake Forest University and graduated in 1882. He moved to Timmonsville, South Carolina, the following year and began pursuing banking and business interests, eventually becoming the president of several banks in South Carolina. In addition, Smith served as president of the South Carolina Baptist Association and was a trustee of Furman University and Greenville Women's College.

Smith was elected to the South Carolina House of Representatives in 1908 and was elected the 67th Lieutenant Governor two years later in 1911. Governor Cole Blease resigned five days before the end of his second term on January 14, 1915. Smith succeeded to the governorship and only performed ceremonial functions during his five days in office.

After serving as governor, Smith moved to Baltimore where he died on April 1, 1916. He was buried at Byrd Cemetery in Timmonsville and a large monument marks his grave.

He and his wife, Fannie L. Byrd, had nine children. Smith was a Baptist.

His home at Timmonsville, the Smith-Cannon House, was listed on the National Register of Historic Places in 1983.

Political offices
Preceded by Thomas G. McLeod	Lieutenant Governor of South Carolina; 1911–1915	Succeeded by Andrew Bethea
Preceded by Coleman L. Blease	Governor of South Carolina; 1915	Succeeded by Richard Irvine Manning III
