= Ira B. Jones =

American judge (1851–1927)

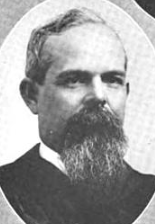

Chief Justice of South Carolina
- In office April 15, 1909 – January 9, 1912
- Preceded by: Young J. Pope
- Succeeded by: Eugene B. Gary

Associate Justice of South Carolina
- In office January 30, 1896 – April 15, 1909
- Preceded by: None (new seat added)
- Succeeded by: Thomas B. Fraser

37th Speaker of the South Carolina House of Representatives
- In office December 23, 1890 – January 30, 1896
- Preceded by: John L.M. Irby
- Succeeded by: Frank B. Gary

Member of the South Carolina House of Representatives
- In office 1890–1896

Personal details
- Born: December 29, 1851 Newberry, South Carolina, US
- Died: December 12, 1927 (aged 75)
- Education: Erskine College

Ira B. Jones (December 29, 1851 – December 12, 1927) was a chief justice on the South Carolina Supreme Court and a candidate for governor in 1912.

== Life and career ==
Jones was born in Newberry, South Carolina on December 29, 1851. Jones began college at Newberry College, but he graduated from Erskine College in 1870. After college, Jones returned to Newberry, taught school for two years, and studied to practice law. He moved to Lancaster, South Carolina in 1875.

In 1890, Jones was elected to the South Carolina House of Representatives, and he was chosen to be the Speaker of the House upon the election of John M.L. Irby as a United States senator. Jones had been the vice president of the South Carolina Constitutional Convention of 1895. On January 30, 1896, he was unanimously elected an associate justice of the South Carolina Supreme Court. The newly adopted South Carolina Constitution created a fourth seat on the state's highest court, and Jones was the first person elected to fill the position. On January 22, 1902, he was reelected to an eight-year term. When Chief Justice Pope resigned, Jones was chosen to complete the unexpired term. He was sworn in on April 15, 1909.

On September 11, 1911, Jones sent his resignation to Governor Cole Blease, effective January 9, 1912. He ran against Blease in the 1912 Democratic Gubernatorial campaign and lost a narrow contest.

Jones was married to Rebecca Wyse. He died on December 12, 1927.
