= 1924 South Carolina gubernatorial election =

1924 South Carolina Democratic gubernatorial primary
- August 26, 1924
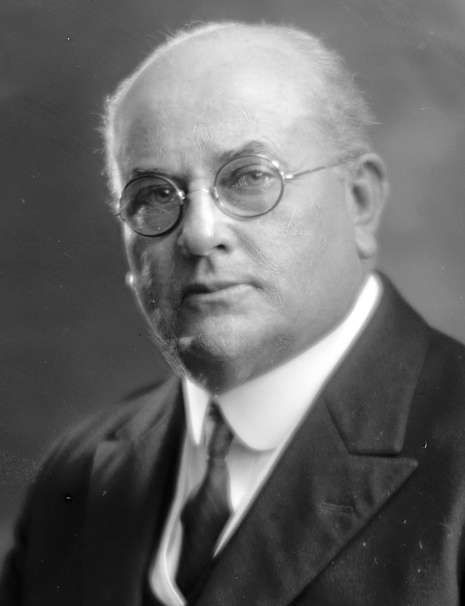

Candidate	Thomas McLeod	John T. Duncan
Party	Democratic	Democratic
Popular vote	125,364	78,643
Percentage	61.45%	38.55%
Governor of South Carolina before election
Thomas Gordon McLeod
Democratic
Elected Governor of South Carolina
Thomas Gordon McLeod
Democratic

The 1924 South Carolina gubernatorial election was held on November 4, 1924, to select the governor of the state of South Carolina. Governor Thomas Gordon McLeod won the Democratic primary and ran unopposed in the general election being reelected for a second two-year term.

== Democratic primary ==
=== Candidates ===
- John T. Duncan, Columbia attorney and perennial candidate
- Thomas Gordon McLeod, incumbent Governor since 1923

=== Campaign ===
The South Carolina Democratic Party held their primary for governor in the summer of 1924 and Governor McLeod was able to avoid a runoff election by obtaining over 50% of the vote in the primary election against J.T. Duncan.

=== Results ===
Democratic Primary
Candidate	Votes	%
Thomas Gordon McLeod	125,364	61.5
John T. Duncan	78,643	38.5

== General election ==
The general election was held on November 4, 1924, and Thomas McLeod was reelected governor of South Carolina without opposition on account of South Carolina's single party government. Turnout increased by approximately 50% over the election in 1922 because there was also a presidential election.

South Carolina Gubernatorial Election, 1924
Party	Candidate	Votes	%	±%
Democratic	Thomas Gordon McLeod (incumbent)	53,345	100.00	0.0
Majority		53,345	100.00	0.0
Turnout		53,345		
Democratic hold				

65+% won by McLeod

== See also ==
- Governor of South Carolina
- List of governors of South Carolina
- South Carolina gubernatorial elections

Preceded by 1922	South Carolina gubernatorial elections	Succeeded by 1926
