= Richard Irvine Manning III =

American politician (1859–1931)

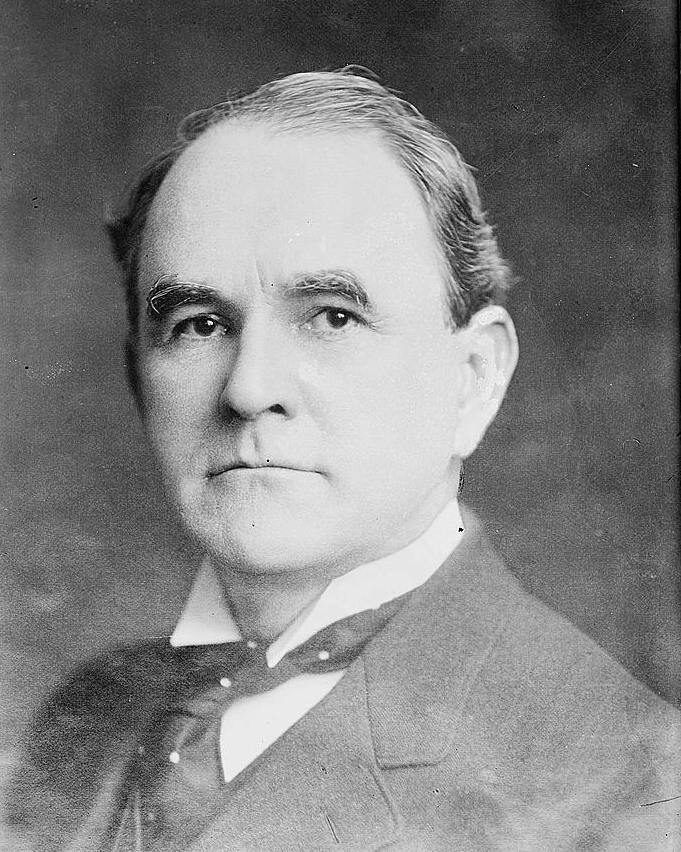

92nd Governor of South Carolina
- In office January 19, 1915 – January 21, 1919
- Lieutenant: Andrew Bethea
- Preceded by: Charles Aurelius Smith
- Succeeded by: Robert Archer Cooper

President Pro Tempore of the South Carolina Senate
- In office January 10, 1905 – January 8, 1907
- Governor: Duncan Clinch Heyward
- Preceded by: John Calhoun Sheppard
- Succeeded by: Coleman Livingston Blease

Member of the South Carolina Senate from Sumter County
- In office January 10, 1899 – January 8, 1907
- Preceded by: Altamount Moses
- Succeeded by: John Hicklin Clifton Jr.

Member of the South Carolina House of Representatives from Sumter County
- In office November 22, 1892 – January 12, 1897

Personal details
- Born: Richard Irvine Manning III; August 15, 1859 Sumter County, South Carolina, U.S.
- Died: September 11, 1931 (aged 72) Columbia, South Carolina, U.S.
- Party: Democratic
- Spouse: Lelia Bernard Meredith
- Children: 13
- Parent: Richard Irvine Manning II
- Education: University of Virginia
- Profession: Banker, politician

Richard Irvine Manning III (August 15, 1859 – September 11, 1931) was an American politician from the U.S. state of South Carolina. He served as a state legislator and as the 92nd governor of South Carolina.

== Biography ==
Richard Irvine Manning III was born in Sumter County, South Carolina, on August 15, 1859, to Richard Irvine Manning II. His grandfather, Richard Irvine Manning I, had served as governor of the state from 1824 to 1826. Manning’s uncle, John Laurence Manning, also held a gubernatorial post, while his grandmother Elizabeth Peyre, Richardson, was related to three former governors. She was an aunt of John Peter Richardson, Jr., a sister of John Peter Richardson, and a niece of James B. Richardson.

Manning was educated at Kenmore Preparatory School in Amherst, Virginia, and the University of Virginia, which attended from 1877 to 1879. There he studied law but left after his sophomore year, and became a successful planter and businessman upon returning to Sumter. Manning held numerous positions in cotton farming, business and banking, including chairman of the board of the People’s State Bank of South Carolina, president of the American Products Export and Import Corporation, and president of the Cotton Warehouse Company. Manning also had a military career, serving as captain of the Red Shirts in 1876 and as an adjutant and captain in the Volunteer State Troops two years later.

An active Democrat, Manning was a regular attendee at state Democratic conventions and at one point served as a member of the Democratic state executive committee. In addition, Manning was a delegate at large to three Democratic national conventions. Manning was also a life trustee of Clemson College, and active in both fraternal work and in his church, Protestant Episcopal, holding various positions including membership of a standing committee Board of Missions and finance committee, warden and vestryman, trustee of the Church Home and Orphanage, and chairman of the Diocesan Committee. Manning also had membership in the State Committee of the Young Men’s Christian Association.

Manning's political career started during the era of Ben Tillman, and Manning served in the South Carolina House of Representatives from 1892 to 1896 before moving up to the South Carolina Senate from 1898 to 1906. Prior to entering politics, Manning earned a reputation as a successful farmer, which led to him being elected an honorary member of the Grange; the national farmers’ society at that time. While serving in the state house, Manning became a member of the ways and means committee and during his senatorial career served as president pro tem and also chairman of a finance committee. Manning stood as a candidate to be governor in 1906 on a platform that called for the state dispensary to be reorganized, but was beaten by a local optionist. Following his defeat, Manning focused on farming and banking until 1914.

== Tenure as governor ==
When he was elected to the governorship in 1914, Manning brought many Progressive Era reforms to a state that had spent four years under the demagogic leadership of Coleman Livingston Blease. During his first term in office, South Carolina prohibited alcohol, established the state's first compulsory education law, and raised the minimum age for employment to 14. South Carolinians expressed their approval of these measures by re-electing Manning to a second term in 1916.

Manning's first term, as noted by one study,

was especially notable for the restoration of the enforcement of the law, for the upholding of the decrees of the courts and sustaining the verdict of the juries; for the banishing of race track gambling and other forms of vice; for the broadening of popular education for town and country, mill and farm, and for the inauguration of compulsory education; for shorter hours of labor and the adoption of a child labor law; for the creation of a Tax Commission and a State Board of Arbitration and conciliation; the equalization of taxes; the reinstatement and reorganization of the National Guard of South Carolina; reorganization in the management of the State Hospital for the Insane; and Establishment of the State Board and Charities and Corrections and the Institution for the Feeble Minded.”

Other reforms were introduced during Manning's time as governor. Teaching training courses were funded while teachers’ salaries were raised by 20% and a state bureau of teacher certification was established. Financial support for education was doubled, while additional funding was secured to improve the quality of teacher training at the state-supported black college at Orangeburg. The secret ballot for all elections was established, along with an industrial school for delinquent white females and a school for mentally handicapped children. A state tuberculosis hospital was also opened. An Act of March the 30th 1916 provided for a weekly pay day in textile mills, while an Act of April the 16th 1916 provided for liability of railroad companies for injuries to employees.

An Act of February the 27th 1917 authorized all towns and cities in the State to (as noted by the text of the law) "Regulate Markets, Hotels, Restaurants, Cafes, Lunch Counters, Etc., in the Interest of Public Health and Welfare.” An Act of February the 13th 1917 provided for Section 1778 of the civil code to be amended in order to permit persons over the age of 21 to attend night schools “Which Are Free Public Schools.” An Act of February the 27th 1917 provided for an equalizing fund to ensure that needy school districts were provided with adequate facilities and teaching corps. Another Act of 1917 sought to prevent fire waste and to ensure safety of life; providing for the repairing and erecting of buildings to be regulated, for buildings and premises to be inspected, and for fixing the punishment for violation. An Act of February the 11th 1918 provided for all interurban railroads or interurban railways operating within the State to (as noted by one study) “furnish their cars, and the vestibule portions of their cars, for the carriage of passengers, with heating apparatuses or appliances necessary to the comfort of all passenger and operators using the same: Provided, This act shall not apply to any railway whose direct line is more than fifty miles long.” A similar Act dated March the 9th 1918 provided (as one study has noted) that “All electric street railway companies doing business in this state shall, after November first, nineteen hundred and eighteen, provide and furnish all their street cars or electric cars with sufficient heat for all passengers and employees.” In addition, adult education was encouraged under Manning's administration.

Although a progressive like Manning, former governor Ben Tillman was opposed to him, describing Manning as one of the Bourbons who “still believe they are divinely commissioned to rule the State” and “the worst politician South Carolina had ever produced who became Governor.” Coleman Livingston Blease also opposed Manning, describing his tenure as governor in 1916 as “the most lawless and extravagant in the history of the state,” as noted by one journal. Despite these criticisms, Manning has been praised for his reform record as governor, with one observer noting that he helped to bring about “many needed changes in state government” and was “especially interested in the improvements of the poor and needy.”

In an address he made during his last month as governor, Manning spoke for the need for greater social justice, arguing that employers "must awaken to a sense of the justice of more adequate pay in order that their employees may meet and solve their problems which multiply with the high cost of living" while calling for measures such as the provision of better housing conditions for "the poorest mill worker and tenant farmer."

Following the end of his tenure as governor, Manning moved to Charleston and also served on the U.S. Peace Committee.

== Death ==
He died on September 11, 1931, at his home in Columbia, South Carolina. He had been ill for three months.

He is interred in the churchyard at Trinity Episcopal Church in Columbia, South Carolina.

== Family ==
On February 10, 1881, at Richmond, Virginia, Manning married Lelia Bernard Meredith, the daughter of Judge John Alexander Meredith and Sarah Ann Bernard Meredith. Six of their sons served in the First World War, with one of them, Major William Sinkler Manning (January 28, 1886 – November 5, 1918) dying in action.

Party political offices
| Preceded by Coleman Livingston Blease | Democratic nominee for Governor of South Carolina; 1914, 1916 | Succeeded by Robert Archer Cooper |
Political offices
| Preceded by Charles Aurelius Smith | Governor of South Carolina; 1915 – 1919 | Succeeded by Robert Archer Cooper |
