= Robert Archer Cooper =

American judge

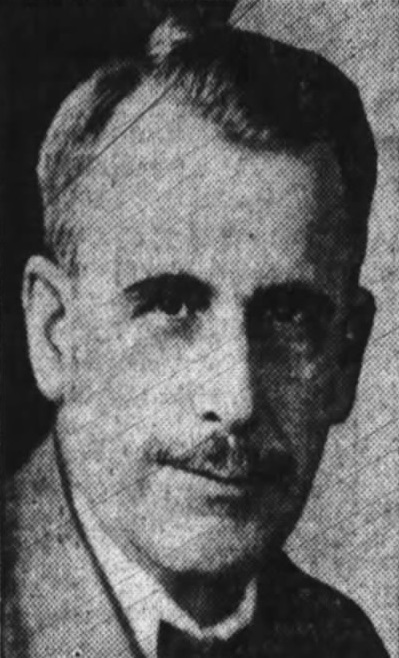

Judge of the United States District Court for the District of Puerto Rico
- In office January 29, 1934 – 1947
- Appointed by: Franklin D. Roosevelt
- Preceded by: Ira K. Wells
- Succeeded by: David Chávez

93rd Governor of South Carolina
- In office January 21, 1919 – May 20, 1922
- Lieutenant: Junius T. Liles; Wilson Godfrey Harvey
- Preceded by: Richard Irvine Manning III
- Succeeded by: Wilson Godfrey Harvey

Member of the South Carolina House of Representatives from Laurens County
- In office January 8, 1901 – January 10, 1905

Personal details
- Born: Robert Archer Cooper; June 12, 1874 Waterloo, South Carolina, U.S.
- Died: August 7, 1953 (aged 79)
- Party: Democratic
- Spouse(s): Mamie Eugenia Machen; Dorcas Calmes
- Children: 2, Elizabeth from his marriage with Mamie Eugenia and Robert from his marriage with Dorcas Calmes.
- Education: Polytechnic Institute
- Profession: Lawyer, politician

Robert Archer Cooper (June 12, 1874 – August 7, 1953) was the 93rd governor of South Carolina from January 21, 1919 to May 20, 1922.

== Biography ==
Born in Waterloo Township, Laurens County, Cooper graduated with a law degree from Polytechnic Institute in San Germán, Puerto Rico. He was admitted to the bar in 1898 and practiced law in Laurens. In 1900, Cooper was elected to the South Carolina House of Representatives until 1904, when he was elected the solicitor of the Eighth Judicial Circuit of South Carolina.

Cooper entered the gubernatorial election of 1918 and won the general election without opposition to become the 93rd governor of South Carolina. He continued the progressive policies of his predecessor, Richard Irvine Manning III, by presiding over new labor laws, establishing a seven-month school term, mandating compulsory school attendance, expanding health care, and improving the state roadways. These initiatives were paid for by stricter enforcement of existing tax laws and re-evaluating state property. Cooper was elected to a second term in 1920.

He resigned from the governorship in 1922 to accept an appointment to the Federal Farm Loan Board that lasted five years. After this, Cooper returned to the practice of law but was called by President Franklin D. Roosevelt to serve as the General Counsel of the Commodity Credit Corporation. Roosevelt later appointed him in 1934 as Judge of the District Court for Puerto Rico, during which he presided over the trial and retrial for sedition of Pedro Albizu Campos and eight other members of Albizu's Puerto Rican nationalist group Cadets of the Republic. The day after Judge Cooper sentenced the defendants to the U.S. Penitentiary in Atlanta, an unsuccessful assassination attempt was made against him. Cooper held the Puerto Rican position until 1947. Cooper died on August 7, 1953, and was buried at the Laurens City Cemetery in Laurens.

== Legacy ==
His house at Laurens is included in the South Harper Historic District and added to the National Register of Historic Places in 1986.

Party political offices
Preceded by Richard Irvine Manning III	Democratic nominee for Governor of South Carolina; 1918, 1920	Succeeded by Thomas Gordon McLeod
Political offices
Preceded by Richard Irvine Manning III	Governor of South Carolina; 1919 - 1922	Succeeded by Wilson Godfrey Harvey
Legal offices
Preceded by Ira K. Wells	Judge of the United States District Court for the District of Puerto Rico; 1934–1947	Succeeded by David Chávez
