= Cole L. Blease =

American politician (1868–1942)

Cole Blease
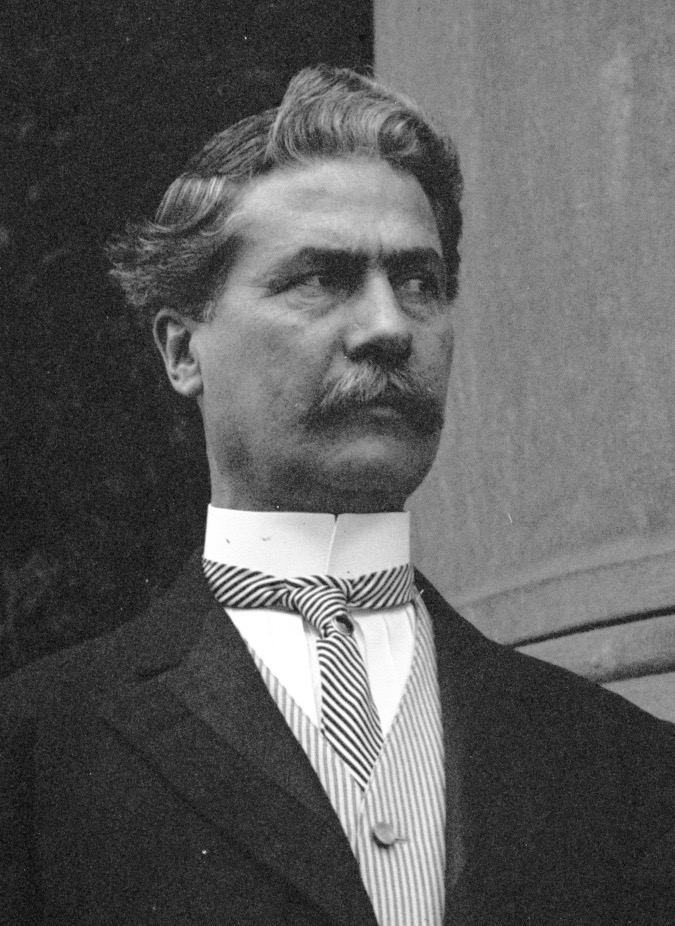
- Blease c. 1910–17

United States Senator from South Carolina
- In office March 4, 1925 – March 3, 1931
- Preceded by: Nathaniel B. Dial
- Succeeded by: James F. Byrnes

90th Governor of South Carolina
- In office January 17, 1911 – January 14, 1915
- Lieutenant: Charles Aurelius Smith
- Preceded by: Martin Frederick Ansel
- Succeeded by: Charles Aurelius Smith

President pro tempore of the South Carolina Senate
- In office January 8, 1907 – January 12, 1909
- Governor: Duncan Clinch Heyward; Martin Frederick Ansel
- Preceded by: Richard Irvine Manning III
- Succeeded by: William Lawrence Mauldin

Member of the South Carolina Senate from Newberry County
- In office January 8, 1907 – January 12, 1909
- Preceded by: George Sewell Mower
- Succeeded by: Alan Johnstone

Member of the South Carolina House of Representatives from Newberry County
- In office January 10, 1899 – January 8, 1901
- In office November 25, 1890 – November 27, 1894

Personal details
- Born: October 8, 1868 Newberry County, South Carolina, US
- Died: January 19, 1942 (aged 73) Columbia, South Carolina, US
- Resting place: Rosemont Cemetery, Newberry, South Carolina
- Party: Democratic
- Spouse(s): Lillie B. Summers; Carolina Floyd
- Parent(s): Henry Horatio Blease; Mary Ann Livingston Blease
- Education: Georgetown University

Coleman Livingston Blease (October 8, 1868 – January 19, 1942) was an American politician of the Democratic Party who served as the 90th governor of South Carolina from 1911 to 1915 and represented the state in the United States Senate from 1925 to 1931. Blease was the political heir of Benjamin Tillman, but he led a political revolution in South Carolina by building an independent political base of white textile mill workers in the state's Upcountry region. He was a staunch white supremacist and frequently used inflammatory rhetoric to appeal to racial animosities among white voters.

As governor and later senator, Blease opposed civil rights for African Americans, spoke in favor of lynching, and resisted educational opportunities for Black citizens. In the Senate, he introduced legislation targeting interracial relationships and criticized efforts at racial inclusion in public life. He was also instrumental in the passage of Section 1325 of the U.S. immigration code, which criminalized unlawful entry into the United States—a provision that remains in effect.

== Early life and education ==
Coleman Livingston Blease was born on October 8, 1868 near the town of Newberry, South Carolina to Henry Horatio Blease (1832–1892), a hotel proprietor, and Mary Ann Livingston Blease (1830–1874). Blease was born the same year that South Carolina's new Reconstruction constitution was adopted, and Black Americans began participating in political life. He grew up in his father's hotel which led him to be uncommonly social. His brother, Eugene, later became chief justice of the South Carolina Supreme Court. He was educated at Newberry College, the University of South Carolina, and Georgetown University, where he graduated from the law department in 1889. At the University of South Carolina, Blease was expelled for plagiarism and always carried a grudge against the university.

== Early political career ==
After his schooling was complete, Blease returned to Newberry to practice law and to enter politics. In 1890, he began a political career in the South Carolina House of Representatives as a protégé of Benjamin Tillman and, like most White South Carolinians, a member of the Democratic Party. In 1895, the state legislature ratified a new constitution that effectively disfranchised Black men, thus crippling the state's Republican Party, which they supported, and introducing a period of one-party rule.

Blease's rise to power, as he moved from the House of Representatives to the South Carolina Senate in 1900, was built on the support of both sharecroppers and white textile mill workers, an increasingly-important segment of the South Carolina electorate. But it was not a straightforward rise, Blease lost his seat in the legislature in 1894 and his attempt to re-gain it in 1896. And while he ultimately obtained a state senate seat in 1900, he subsequently lost races to become the Democratic nominee for governor in 1904 and 1906.

In 1910, Blease was elected mayor of Newberry and held that position until November of that year, when he was elected governor of South Carolina.

== Bleasism ==
Critics and allies of Blease alike used the term Bleasism to "designate the political uprising of first-generation South Carolina millworkers" led by Blease in 1910. The political uprising was different from the one led by Ben Tillman a generation earlier. Whereas Tillman sought agricultural reform and drew his political support from South Carolina's white farmers and planters, Blease was anti-reform and drew his support from white textile mill workers. The movement Blease led was largely characterized by white supremacy and not social policy. But it shared the same enemies as Tillmanism: the newspapers, the railroads, corporations, Charleston aristocrats, and urban businessmen.

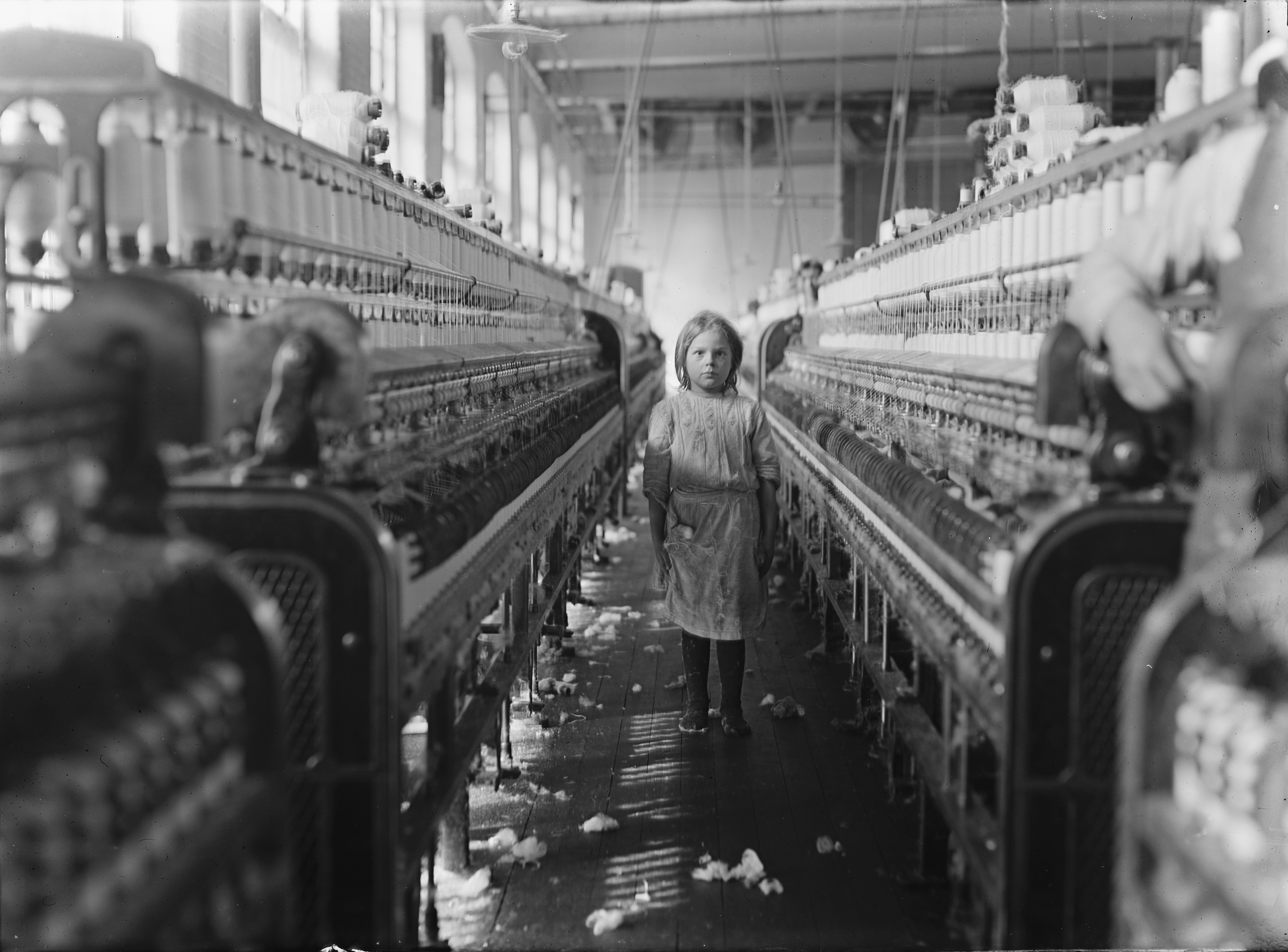
A child laborer in a textile mill in Blease's hometown of Newberry.

Bleasism was made possible by the sociopolitical change South Carolina underwent at the turn of the twentieth century. For instance, in 1880, the state had close to a dozen textile mills, but in 1900 the number had grown to 115. The work force of the mills also changed, becoming increasingly xmore male each year. Because South Carolina was one of the few Southern states at the time that did not disenfranchise poor white men, Blease actively courted the workers of these mills and built a devoted political base from the men, who hung his photo in their homes and named their children after him.

His appeal to the millworkers and sharecroppers was based on his personality and his view that made the "inarticulate masses feel that Coley was making them an important political force in the state." In fact, little to no policy was tied to Blease but his invectives and shared tongue with the mill workers won him their favor. Because of this, Blease was the only politician in South Carolina who had any independence from Tillman while Tillman was alive. Blease promoted his image as a champion of the common people throughout his career, describing himself as the “poor man's best friend” while his weekly newspaper during the Twenties encouraged voters to “save South Carolina and Ring Rule and Corporate Control” and elect friends of the “Farmers and Laboring Men.” Both Blease and supporters of his also promoted him as a supporter of working people.

One newspaper article commented on Blease's populist style from one of his speeches:

“Blease pulls up his sleeves, looks over his audience, and launches into his speech. He denounces his enemies, sticks to his friends, declares he has nothing to explain and nothing to apologize for, hits hard at the hostile press, attacks high taxes and those in office who imposed them, gives his opinion of the creation of new offices to be filled with political ‘pets,’ declares his devotion to the working man’s cause, and so on until the driving, dynamic concluding rhetoric is drowned in cheering. He knows the chords to play upon. He knows the popular mind and the little things that affect it. He can be serious or can laugh, can be sentimental or vitriolic, according to the subject in hand. He can express the grouches, the hopes, the irritations, the ambitions of those who believe in him.”

— L. S. Cassel, Brooklyn Daily Eagle, September 20, 1925

== Governor of South Carolina (1911–15) ==
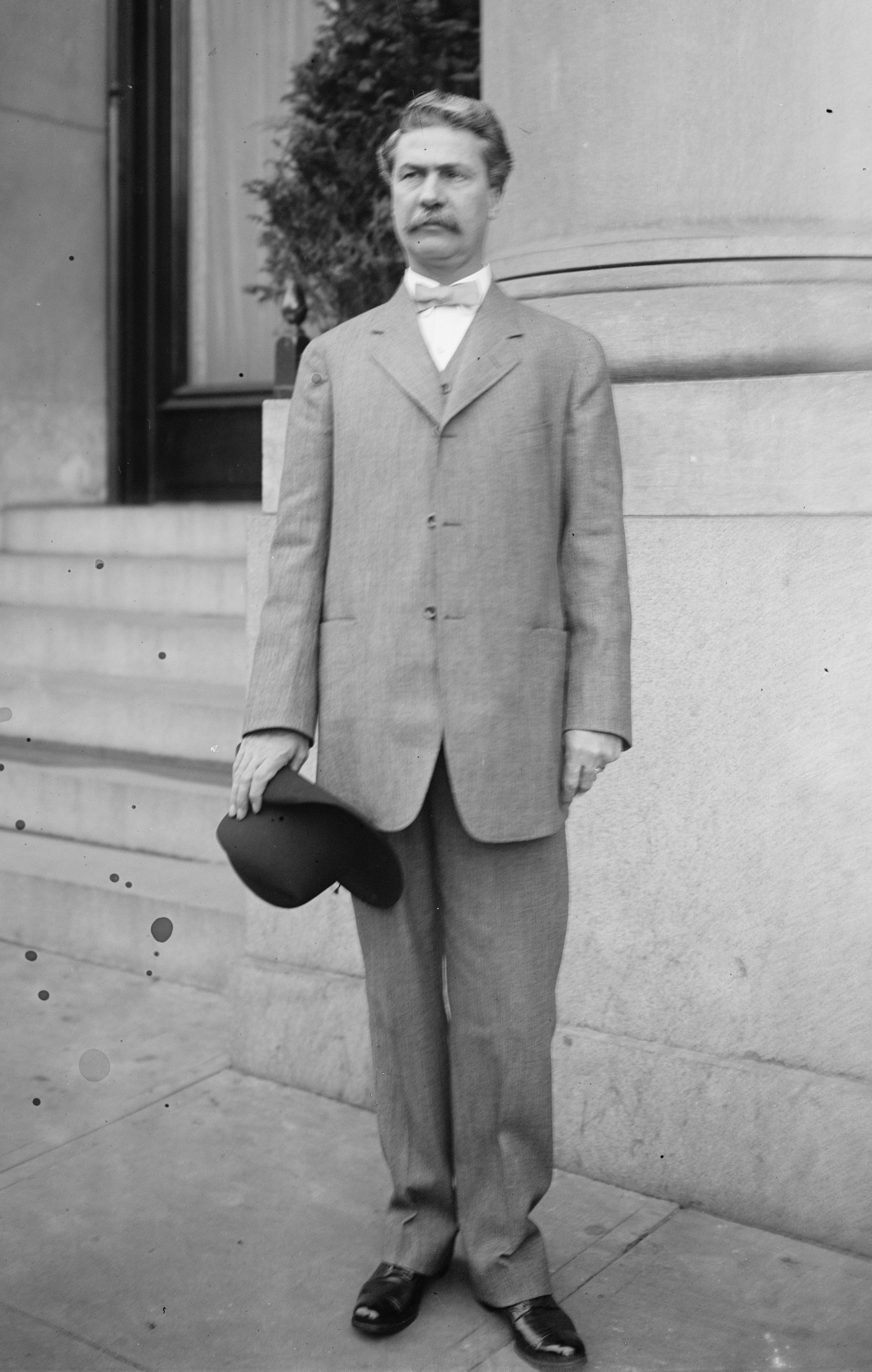
Blease in 1912

Blease was elected governor in 1910 because he "knew how to play on race, religious, and class prejudices to obtain votes." He favored more aid to white schools but opposed compulsory attendance. Although Blease presented himself as a supporter of legislation designed to help laboring people and regulate working hours, and abolished the textile mill at the state penitentiary for health reasons, he opposed inspections of private factories to ensure safe and healthful working conditions. Blease vetoed legislation to inspect factories for safety and health considerations, stating (according to one study) "that a man ought to be able to work under any conditions he chose.” He also opposed the medical examination of schoolchildren, “asserting that he would pardon any man who killed a doctor who violated his daughter's modesty.”

Blease acquired such a bad reputation that he was said to represent the worst aspects of Jim Crow and Benjamin Tillman, who branded Blease's style as "Jim Tillmanism" (Jim Tillman was Benjamin Tillman's nephew, who, as lieutenant governor, had killed a newspaper editor and been acquitted in the case). Blease favored complete white supremacy in all matters. He encouraged the practice of lynching, strongly opposed the education of Black people, and derided an opponent for being a trustee of a black school. He fired administrators without the authority to do so, ignored patronage requests from state legislators, and sparred with the state Supreme Court. Blease had also boasted of burying the severed finger of a lynched black man in the South Carolina gubernatorial garden.

As governor, Blease failed to enforce laws and was a scofflaw. On two occasions, he pardoned his black chauffeur when he was cited for speeding. Enjoying the power to pardon, Blease said that he wanted to pardon at least 1,000 men before he exited office because he wanted "to give the poor devils a chance." He is estimated to have pardoned between 1,500 and 1,700 prisoners, some of whom were guilty of murder and other serious crimes. His political enemies suggested that Blease received payments to pardon criminals. Among those he pardoned was former US Representative George W. Murray in 1912. The black Republican had lost an appeal for his conviction of forgery in 1905 by an all-white jury and was sentenced to hard labor. Refusing to serve for a conviction that he claimed resulted from racial discrimination, Murray had left the state permanently for Chicago.

Segregation was also encouraged under Blease. A proposal put forward by Blease (and passed into law) segregated the black and white convicts of county chain gangs.

Despite his racist politics and contradictory approach to reform, a number of positive measures were nevertheless enacted during Blease's time as governor. Better provision for common schools was introduced, along with a special tax on hydroelectric companies, and a state tuberculosis sanitarium. In 1914 a State Warehouse System was established under which, as noted by one study, “low insurance rates were provided and storage receipts were guaranteed by the State – consequently they immediately became acceptable collateral for the local banks. Thus cotton farmers could get at least some cash on which to live and operate.” A law of February 1911 established maximum working hours for women in mercantile establishments and “provided also that they should not be required to work after 10 o’clock at night.” An Act of February 1912, concerning notice of suspension of work, required employers to give notice to their employees, while another Act from that same month provided for the provision of headlights on locomotives. A 1914 law required railroad companies to maintain shelters at division points “if repair work is regularly done at such points.” A statute related to the working hours of women in mercantile establishments was amended (No. 262) “by authorizing its enforcement by duly authorized agents of the commissioner of labor as well as by himself and the inspectors connected with the department.” A law of February 1914 allowed for labor organizations with a national or international charter to “form mutual associations, incorporated or unincorporated, for the purpose of aiding their members or their beneficiaries in times of sickness and death by levying equitable assessments for the payment of sick relief or death benefits, upon compliance with the terms of this act.” Another Act from that same month provided for railroad warning boards to be erected.

The factory law was changed in 1912 “so as to absolutely prohibit the employment of children under 12.” A measure dated February the 20th 1912 provided that in cities with a population of 5,000 or over “no child under 14 years of age shall be employed as messenger and no minor under 18 shall be so employed between 10pm and 5pm.” A law related to public health was also introduced, together with a law to provide for the custody of destitute, abandoned and unprotected children. An Act of February the 18th 1911 provided for the payment of one annual pension for the benefit of deceased pensioners, either a soldier or soldier's widow. An Act of March the 1st 1913 sought to require Clemson College to furnish, at cost, serum to state citizens for treating hog cholera, with the serum provided free to poor persons unable to pay for it. Another law authorized the awarding of 51 beneficiary scholarships “by holding competitive examinations; said scholarships to be of the value of $100 per annum and free tuition.” This measure became law without Blease's approval. Blease's lack of support for this measure was arguably due to the fact that, while he believed in free scholarships, he felt that “they should be divided among the people, and not all poured into the laps of a few families.”

=== Opposition to soft drinks ===
Blease disliked the newly developed carbonated soft drinks. In his gubernatorial inaugural address in 1911, he said:

I also, in this connection, beg leave to call your attention to the evil of the habitual drinking of Coca-Cola, Pepsi-Cola, and such like mixtures, as I fully believe they are injurious. It would be better for our people if they had nice, respectable places where they could go and buy a good, pure glass of cold beer, than to drink such concoctions.

=== 1912 re-election ===
In 1912, Blease faced Ira B. Jones in the Democratic gubernatorial primary and narrowly won the contest, and subsequently another term as governor. Jones, a Tillmanite and Chief Justice on the state Supreme Court, was no match for Blease on the stump. Jones claimed that Bleasism "led to anarchy" and campaigned on "law and order." He had Charleston Mayor John P. Grace campaign against Blease in the upcountry. Further, he argued that Blease rewarded his friends with positions in government. But Blease ultimately prevailed in the contest.

Blease had made an agreement with Ben Tillman, who was running for re-election to the Senate, that the two would endorse each other. However, Tillman betrayed this promise several days before the election by releasing a letter denigrating Bleasism.

== Failed campaigns for office (1914–22) ==
=== 1914 campaign for United States Senate ===
In 1914, before Blease's tenure as governor was over, Blease was so confident that he would be elected to the U.S. Senate if he ran that he visited the Senate chambers in Washington to choose his desk. However, after numerous blunders including his speech at the 1912 National Governors' Conference in Richmond, Virginia, Blease's popularity had waned and the incumbent, Senator Ellison D. Smith was able to secure re-election by 15,000 votes.

In a show of spite for progressive governor-elect Richard Irvine Manning III, Blease resigned five days before the end of his second term on January 14, 1915, so that he did not have to attend Manning's inauguration. Lieutenant Governor Charles Aurelius Smith succeeded to the governorship and performed ceremonial functions during his five days in office.

After leaving office, Blease moved his criminal law practice from Newberry to Columbia and continued railing against his political enemies. He occupied his time giving speeches in rural towns and discussing his use of the governor's parole power in national forums. Further, he spoke out against Governor Manning's policies regarding prohibition (Blease popularly said he would not enforce the dispensary laws in the wet cities, Charleston and Columbia) and Manning's newly created administrative agencies which he called useless.

=== 1916 campaign for Governor ===
In 1916, Blease challenged Governor Manning for re-election. A third candidate, Robert Archer Cooper, won the support of many textile mill owners alarmed by Bleasism and Manning's progressive reforms. Blease revived his political coalition of mill workers and sharecroppers, and he made political capital out of Manning's use of troops to evict striking workers from a mill in Anderson. Tillman openly supported Manning in the election.

Blease placed first in the August 29 Democratic primary, but fell a few thousand votes short of the majority necessary to avoid a runoff election. With Cooper out of the race, mill owners and most other conservatives threw their support to Manning, who narrowly won the September 12 Democratic Party primary runoff, which was tantamount to election.

=== 1918 campaign for United States Senate ===
In 1917, Blease denounced America's entry into World War I. However, he recanted this position the following year. Nonetheless, his statements came back to haunt him when he ran for the 1918 Democratic nomination for the Senate seat opened upon Tillman's death that July. President Wilson declared Blease "no friend of the administration" and Blease's former political allies refused to endorse him. Blease lost the primary contest to Nathaniel B. Dial, who then ran unopposed in the general election.

=== 1922 campaign for Governor ===
Following his loss in 1918, Blease was politically inactive for the next three years. But as the political climate turned more reactionary after 1919, when the state and nation suffered with postwar economic adjustments and racial unrest, Blease's popularity rebounded. Blease did not run for any public office in 1920. However, Blease threw his hat in the ring once again in 1922 when he ran for governor. Blease failed to capture a majority of the votes and lost to Thomas Gordon McLeod in the run-off by over 15,000 votes.

In virtually all of his campaigns, Blease used a catchy, nonsensical, nonspecific campaign jingle that became well known to virtually every voter in South Carolina in the era. For instance, he used, "Roll up your sleeves, say what you please... the man for the job is Coley Blease!"

== U.S. Senator (1925–31) ==
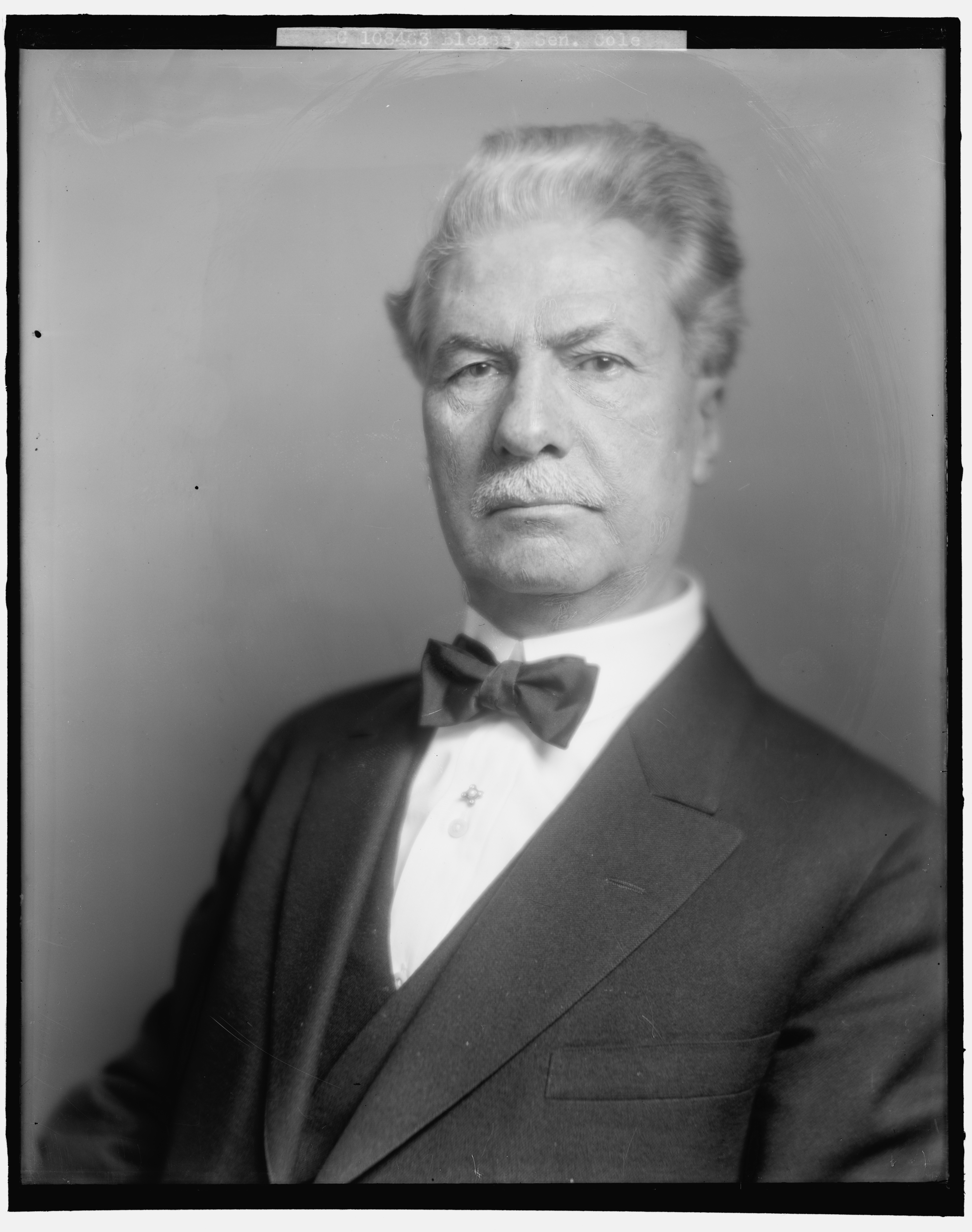
A photograph of Blease when he was in the U.S. Senate.

=== 1924 election ===
In the 1924 South Carolina US Senate race, Blease was elected after defeating James F. Byrnes and incumbent Nathaniel Dial in the Democratic primary. His campaign foreshadowed his style as senator. Blease's defeat of Byrnes was widely credited to a rumor campaign that Byrnes, who was raised as a Roman Catholic in Charleston, had not really left that faith. Such an assertion in an overwhelmingly Protestant state, while the Ku Klux Klan was at the height of its power, ruined Byrnes's political hopes that year. As Senator, Blease continued to voice his staunch opposition to the education of African Americans in the most racist of terms. In 1925, he told a Charlotte, North Carolina newspaper: "I think the greatest mistake a white man ever made was to put his hand in his pocket to educate a nigger. You can't educate a horse or a mule or a cow, and you can't educate a nigger. They weren't made to be educated. We don't need them for lawyers or pharmacists and all that. They were made to cut wood, draw water, and work in the fields." Nonetheless, some have argued that Blease was considerably more moderate in the election than in his previous political campaigns.

=== Views and policies ===
Blease spent much of his political career avidly proposing racist policies. In 1926, Blease proposed an anti-miscegenation amendment to the US Constitution to require Congress to set a punishment for interracial couples attempting to get married and for people officiating an interracial marriage, but Congress never submitted it to the states.

In 1929, in protest of First Lady Lou Hoover's invitation of Jessie De Priest, the African-American wife of Illinois Representative Oscar De Priest, to tea at the White House, Blease proposed a resolution, "[t]o request the Chief Executive to respect the White House," demanding for the Hoovers to "remember that the house in which they are temporarily residing is the 'White House'." In support of the resolution, Blease read the 1901 poem "Niggers in the White House" on the floor of the Senate. After immediate protests from Northern Republican Senators Walter Edge and Hiram Bingham, the poem was excluded from the Congressional Record. Bingham described the poem as "indecent, obscene doggerel" which gave "offense to hundreds of thousands of our fellow citizens and... to the Declaration of Independence and our Constitution." Blease withdrew the resolution but said that he did so "because it gave offense to his friend, Senator Bingham, and not because it might give any offense to the Negro race."

That year, Blease made a significant contribution to American immigration law. He brokered a compromise between dueling factions and shepherded a bill through Congress which criminalized unlawful entry into the United States, thus paving the way for Section 1325.

During his time as a senator, Blease became known for his advocacy of severance pay for industrial employees, farm relief, and a national Jim Crow law.

Commenting on Blease's record as senator, one journal from 1929 argued that

His votes are highly independent; he never attends a Democratic caucus. Impartial observers rate him thus: No constructive legislator, in a large sense, he nevertheless gets things for South Carolina (jobs, public buildings, waterway developments, a new judicial district). He frequently says what many another Senator thinks but dares not utter. He is more of a Senate character than a Senate statesman.

== 1930 defeat and post-Senate years ==
Byrnes defeated Blease in his 1930 run for re-election to the Senate. In the years following his electoral defeat, he continued to speak out on political issues. During the Great Depression, he spoke out against the suffering of starving children, but at the same time was a strong critic of Franklin D. Roosevelt's New Deal, going so far as to support his old rival Ellison D. Smith due to his stance against the New Deal. Despite having previously been an advocate of labor rights for most of his political career, Blease spoke out against New Deal policies designed to be of benefit to working people such as the National Industrial Recovery Act of 1933 (which he regarded as unconstitutional) and the Wagner labor bill, which he described as “a curse to the South.” Blease also criticized money being voted on (as he put it) “to give jobs to people who are too damned lazy to work” while also proclaiming “I don't believe in feeding people who have never worked and never will work.” In 1935, Blease denounced Roosevelt's social security program, especially old age pensions, asking rhetorically:

Why should the taxpayers feed the old? Some day I’ll be old myself, and who is going to feed me?

In contrast to Blease, John D. Long (a former private secretary of his) supported old age pensions, declaring (according to one journal) that “we should be our brother's keeper when he is infirm and helpless.”

In 1934, while unsuccessfully seeking his party's nomination to run as candidate for governor of South Carolina, Blease defended his previous record in that position, asserting that

When I was governor, you were happy and had plenty to eat. Today we are bankrupt. ... I have abused no person. In everything I have said and done I have at all times the best interests of the people at heart. With the help of God, South Carolina can be made a happy state."

In 1940, Blease became a member of an unemployment compensation commission in South Carolina.

Blease died in Columbia, South Carolina on the night of January 19, 1942, a day after he underwent surgery.

Party political offices
Preceded by Martin Frederick Ansel	Democratic nominee for Governor of South Carolina; 1910, 1912	Succeeded by Richard Irvine Manning III
Preceded by Nathaniel B. Dial	Democratic nominee for U.S. Senator from South Carolina (Class 2); 1924	Succeeded by James F. Byrnes
Political offices
Preceded by Martin Frederick Ansel	Governor of South Carolina; 1911–1915	Succeeded by Charles Aurelius Smith
U.S. Senate
Preceded by Nathaniel B. Dial	United States Senator from South Carolina; 1925–1931	Succeeded by James F. Byrnes
