= Senator Hundley =

Senator Hundley may refer to:

- Oscar Richard Hundley (1855–1921), Alabama State Senate
- Walter Hundley (born 1953), South Carolina State Senate
