= Lorry Dawkins =

United States school principal

Lorry H. Dawkins (died 1969) was a school principal in the United States. He was a star football player at South Carolina State University and helped it win a state championship. He was the first president of what became Denmark Technical College.

He was the first principal for the school that became Denmark Technical College, serving from 1948 until his death. It was then a trade school. In 1950 it was reported to have 563 students.

Speaker of the South Carolina House of Representatives Solomon Blatt paid tribute to him on Dawkins Day in 1971. Denmark city government proclaimed the day. University of South Carolina's Lorry H. Dawkins Track and Field Complex is named after him as is a residence hall is at Denmark Technical College.

He is a member of the South Carolina State Athletics University Hall of Fame.
