= Strom Thurmond =

American politician (1902–2003)

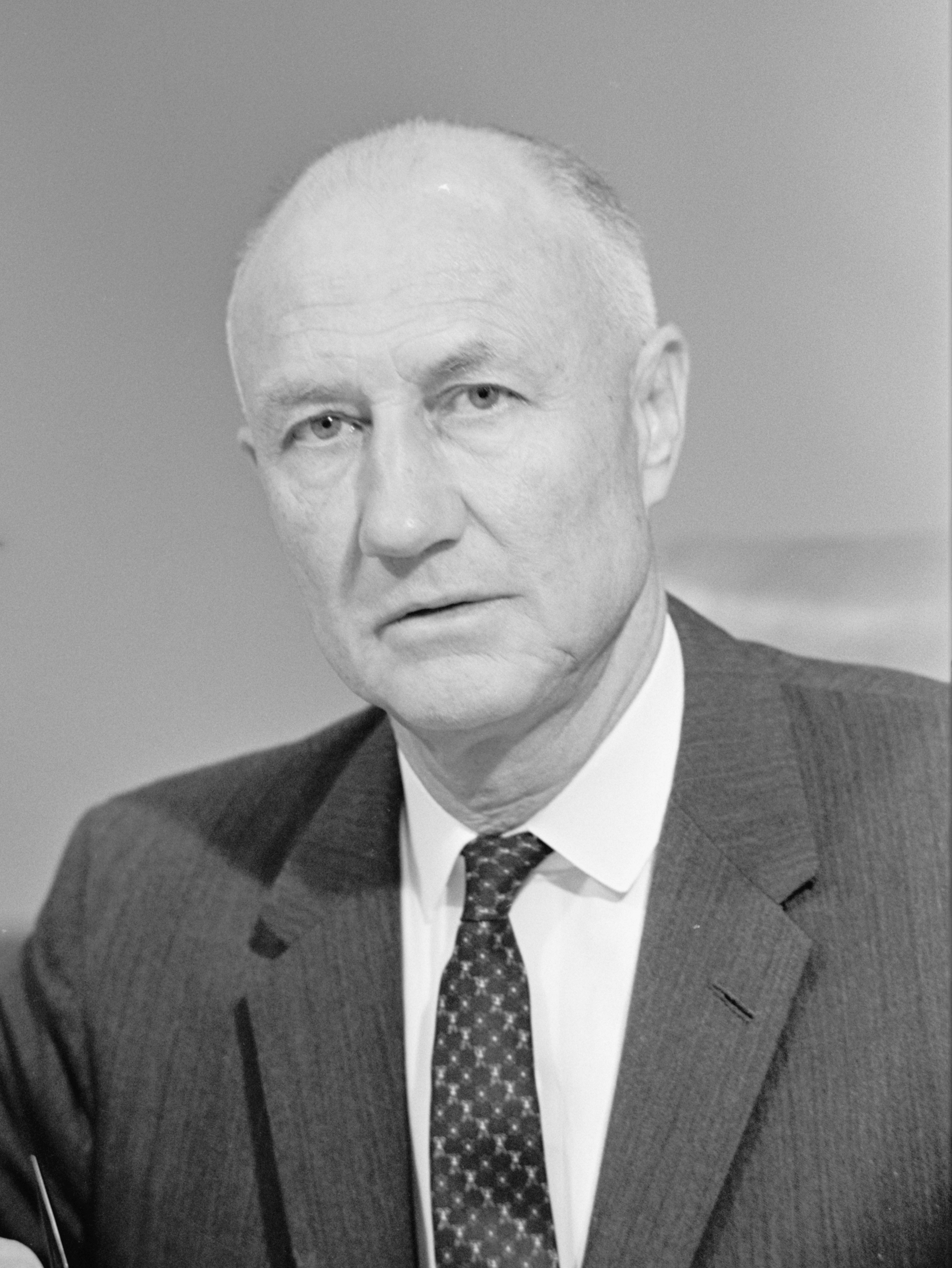
- Thurmond in 1961

President pro tempore of the United States Senate
- In office January 20, 2001 – June 6, 2001
- Preceded by: Robert Byrd
- Succeeded by: Robert Byrd
- In office January 3, 1995 – January 3, 2001
- Preceded by: Robert Byrd
- Succeeded by: Robert Byrd
- In office January 3, 1981 – January 3, 1987
- Preceded by: Warren Magnuson
- Succeeded by: John C. Stennis
Senate positions
President pro tempore emeritus of the United States Senate
In office June 6, 2001 – January 3, 2003
Preceded by	Position established
Succeeded by	Robert Byrd
Dean of the United States Senate
In office January 3, 1989 – January 3, 2003
Preceded by	John C. Stennis
Succeeded by	Robert Byrd
Chairman of the Senate Armed Services Committee
In office January 3, 1995 – January 3, 1999
Preceded by	Sam Nunn
Succeeded by	John Warner
Ranking Member of the Senate Armed Services Committee
In office January 3, 1993 – January 3, 1995
Preceded by	John Warner
Succeeded by	Sam Nunn
In office January 3, 1973 – January 3, 1977
Preceded by	Margaret Smith
Succeeded by	John Tower
Chairman of the Senate Judiciary Committee
In office January 3, 1981 – January 3, 1987
Preceded by	Ted Kennedy
Succeeded by	Joe Biden
Ranking Member of the Senate Judiciary Committee
In office January 3, 1987 – January 3, 1993
Preceded by	Joe Biden
Succeeded by	Orrin Hatch
In office January 3, 1977 – January 3, 1981
Preceded by	Roman Hruska
Succeeded by	Joe Biden

United States Senator from South Carolina
- In office November 7, 1956 – January 3, 2003
- Preceded by: Thomas A. Wofford
- Succeeded by: Lindsey Graham
- In office December 24, 1954 – April 4, 1956
- Preceded by: Charles E. Daniel
- Succeeded by: Thomas A. Wofford

103rd Governor of South Carolina
- In office January 21, 1947 – January 16, 1951
- Lieutenant: George Bell Timmerman Jr.
- Preceded by: Ransome Judson Williams
- Succeeded by: James F. Byrnes

Member of the South Carolina Senate from the Edgefield County district
- In office January 10, 1933 – January 14, 1938
- Preceded by: Thomas Greneker
- Succeeded by: William Yonce

Personal details
- Born: James Strom Thurmond; December 5, 1902 Edgefield, South Carolina, U.S.
- Died: June 26, 2003 (aged 100) Edgefield, South Carolina, U.S.
- Resting place: Edgefield Village Cemetery
- Party: Democratic (until 1964); Republican (from 1964)
- Other political affiliations: Dixiecrat (1948)
- Spouses: Jean Crouch (m. 1947; died 1960); Nancy Moore (m. 1968; sep. 1991)
- Children: 5, including Essie, Strom Jr., and Paul
- Education: Clemson University (BS)

Military service
- Allegiance: United States
- Branch/service: United States Army; Army Reserve
- Years of service: 1924–1964
- Rank: Major General
- Battles/wars: World War II; Normandy Campaign
- Awards: Legion of Merit (2); Bronze Star (with valor); Purple Heart; World War II Victory Medal; European–African–Middle Eastern Campaign Medal; Order of the Crown (Belgium); Croix de Guerre (France)
- Strom Thurmond's voice Thurmond discusses the nominations of William Rehnquist and Antonin Scalia at an executive session of the Senate Judiciary Committee. Recorded August 15, 1986

James Strom Thurmond (December 5, 1902 – June 26, 2003) was a United States Senator from South Carolina who served from 1954 to 1956 and from 1956 to 2003. An avid segregationist, he was the States' Rights Democratic Party ("Dixiecrat") candidate in the 1948 presidential election against Harry S. Truman and Thomas E. Dewey, finishing in third place with 2.4% of the popular vote. Thurmond was originally a Southern Democrat who turned to the Republican Party amid his support for presidential nominee Barry Goldwater and following the passage of the Civil Rights Act of 1964. Although he opposed civil rights legislation for most of his life, he moderated his stances starting from the 1970s.

A staunch opponent of civil rights legislation in the 1950s and 1960s, Thurmond completed the longest single-person Senate filibuster, at 24 hours and 18 minutes in length, in opposition to the Civil Rights Act of 1957. (Note: This also set a record for the longest speech ever given by a single senator. This record was surpassed by Senator Cory Booker who held the floor for 25 hours and four minutes from March 31 to April 1, 2025.) In the 1960s, Thurmond voted against both the Civil Rights Act of 1964 and the Voting Rights Act of 1965. Despite his support for Jim Crow laws, Thurmond denied the accusation that he was a racist by insisting he was a supporter of states' rights and an opponent of excessive federal authority. Thurmond switched parties ahead of the 1964 United States presidential election, saying that the Democratic Party no longer represented people like him, and endorsed Republican nominee Barry Goldwater, who also opposed the Civil Rights Act. With Thurmond's party switch, he became the first Republican U.S. Senator from South Carolina since John J. Patterson in 1879. By the 1970s, Thurmond started to moderate his stance on race, but continued to defend his prior support for segregation based on states' rights and Southern society at the time.

As a Republican, Thurmond served three times as President pro tempore of the United States Senate, and chaired the Senate Judiciary Committee from 1981 to 1987 and the Senate Armed Services Committee from 1995 to 1999. He retired in 2003 as the only member of either chamber of Congress to reach the age of 100 while still in office and the oldest-serving senator; he died less than six months later. His 47 years as a senator, a record at the time, is the fourth-longest in U.S. history behind Robert Byrd, Daniel Inouye, and Patrick Leahy. Thurmond was also, at 14 years, the longest-serving dean of the United States Senate.

== Early life and education (1902–1933) ==
James Strom Thurmond was born on December 5, 1902, in Edgefield, South Carolina. He was the second of six children born to John William Thurmond (1862–1934) and Eleanor Gertrude Strom (1870–1958). Thurmond's father was a lawyer and politician who served as a county supervisor and representative to the South Carolina General Assembly. In 1902, Thurmond's father unsuccessfully contested the election for United States Congress. Strom's mother came from a well-known Edgefield family. She was a deeply religious woman, known for delivering prayers.

Thurmond learned to ride ponies, horses, and bulls from an early age. When Thurmond was four, his family moved into a larger home, where they owned about six acres (2.4 ha) of land. His parents were frequently visited by politicians and lawyers. At six years old, he had an encounter with Benjamin Tillman, a senator from South Carolina. Thurmond remembered the handshake with Tillman as his first political skill.

Thurmond attended Clemson Agricultural College of South Carolina (now Clemson University), where he studied horticulture. At Clemson, he served as the president of the Calhoun Literary Society, where he debated and learned parliamentary procedure. He was deeply influenced by his English professor—David Wistar Daniel, namesake of D. W. Daniel High School. Thurmond graduated from Clemson in 1923 with a Bachelor of Science degree.

After his graduation, Thurmond worked as a farmer, teacher, and athletic coach.

In 1925, Thurmond fathered a child born to Carrie Butler, an African-American teenager who worked as his family's housekeeper. In 2003, the Thurmond family confirmed that Thurmond fathered a mixed-race daughter named Essie Mae with Butler. While her paternity was long hidden, he helped support her and paid for her college education.

In 1929, Thurmond was appointed as Edgefield County's superintendent of education. While serving as superintendent of education, he began studying to become a lawyer by reading law under his father's guidance.

== Early career (1933–1947) ==
=== South Carolina Senate (1933–1938) ===
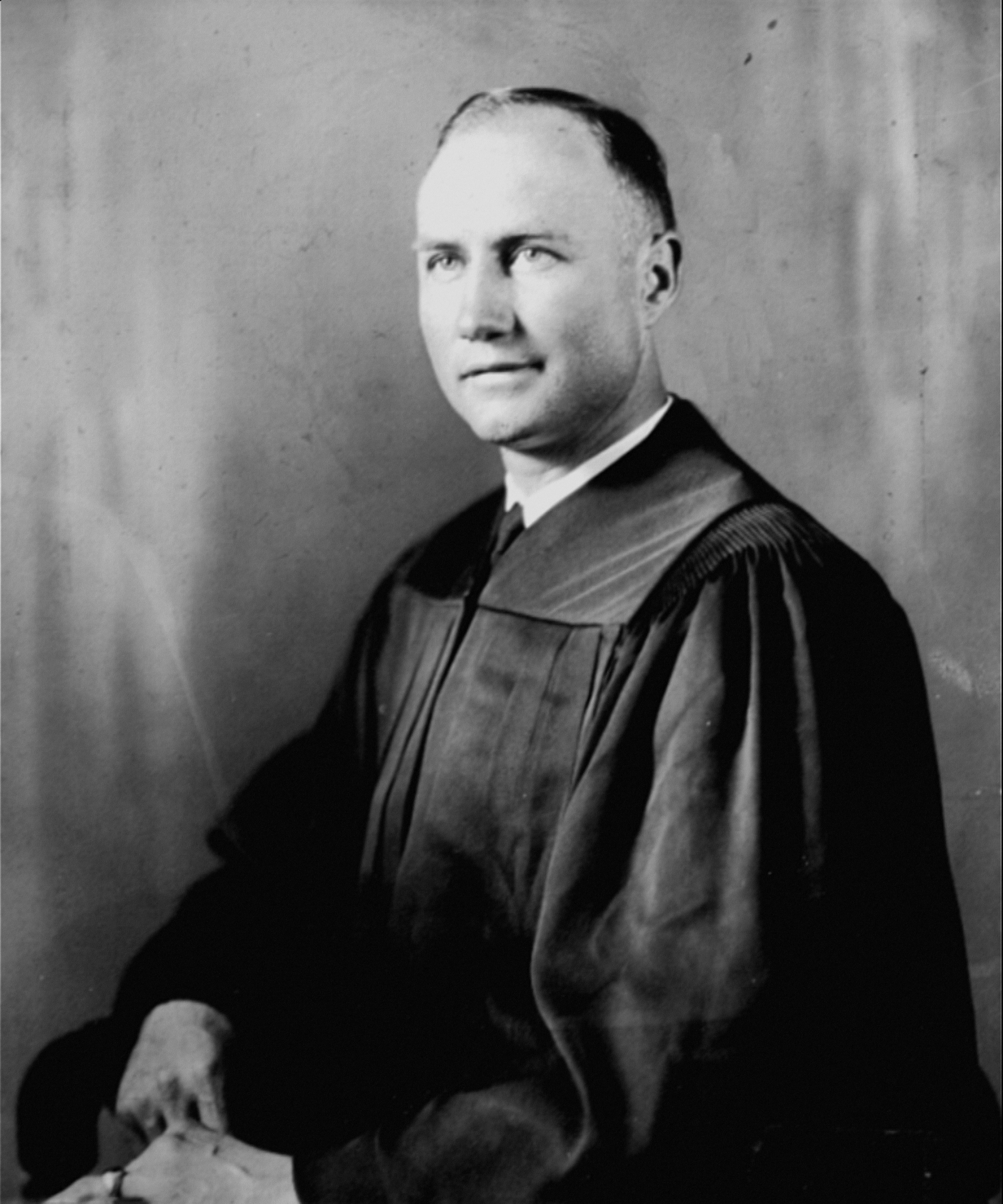
Thurmond as S.C. Circuit Judge, 1939

In 1930, Thurmond was admitted to the South Carolina bar. He was appointed as the Edgefield Town and County attorney, serving from 1930 to 1938. Thurmond supported Franklin D. Roosevelt in the 1932 presidential election. Thurmond favored Roosevelt's argument that the federal government could be used to assist citizens in the daily plights brought on by the Great Depression. Thurmond raised money for Roosevelt and, following his victory, traveled to Washington to attend Roosevelt's inauguration.

In 1933, Thurmond began his own political career by being elected to the South Carolina Senate. He served there until 1938, when he was elected as a state circuit judge. During his days as a circuit judge, after Sue Logue participated in planning the murder of Davis Timmerman, Thurmond convinced her to surrender to authorities.

=== World War II ===
In 1942, at age 39, after the U.S. formally entered World War II, Judge Thurmond resigned from the bench to serve in the U.S. Army, rising to lieutenant colonel. In the Battle of Normandy (June 6 – August 25, 1944), he landed in a glider attached to the 82nd Airborne Division. For his military service, Thurmond received 18 decorations, medals and awards, including the Legion of Merit with Oak Leaf Cluster, Bronze Star with Valor device, Purple Heart, World War II Victory Medal, European–African–Middle Eastern Campaign Medal, Belgium's Order of the Crown and France's Croix de Guerre.

During 1954–55, Thurmond was president of the Reserve Officers Association. He retired from the U.S. Army Reserve with the rank of major general.

== Governor of South Carolina (1947–1951) ==
Running as a Democrat in what was virtually a one-party state, since most African Americans (who then favored the Republican Party) were still disenfranchised by state discriminatory laws and practices, Thurmond was elected governor of South Carolina in 1946. He had promised to make state government more transparent and accountable by weakening the power of a group of politicians from Barnwell, whom Thurmond dubbed the Barnwell Ring, led by House Speaker Solomon Blatt.

Many voters considered Thurmond a progressive for much of his term, in large part due to his influence in gaining the arrest of the perpetrators of the lynching of Willie Earle. Though none of the men were found guilty by an all-white jury, in a case where the defense called no witnesses, Thurmond was congratulated by the NAACP and the ACLU for his efforts to bring the murderers to justice.

In 1949, Thurmond oversaw the opening of Camp Croft State Park. In November he was unanimously elected Chairman of the Southern Governors Conference and was considered to be a states' rights nominee.

Various reforms were also carried out in areas such as education, agriculture, working conditions, and social welfare during Thurmond's time as governor.

=== 1948 presidential campaign ===
During his first year as governor, Thurmond publicly supported Truman, saying during a 1947 radio broadcast:

We who believe in a liberal political philosophy, in the importance of human rights as well as property rights, in the preservation and strengthening of the economic and social gains brought about by the efforts of the Democratic Party … will vote for the election of Harry Truman.

In the 1948 presidential election, however, Thurmond ran for president as the nominee of the States' Rights Democratic Party, which was formed by White southern Democrats who split from the national party over the threat of federal intervention in state policies regarding racial segregation and Jim Crow laws and practices.

Thurmond's supporters took control of the Democratic Party in the Deep South. Truman was not on the presidential ballot in Alabama because that state's Supreme Court ruled void any requirement for party electors to vote for the national nominee. Thurmond said that Truman, Thomas Dewey, and Henry A. Wallace would lead the U.S. to totalitarianism. He said civil rights initiatives were dangerous to the American constitution and made the country susceptible to communism in the event of their enactment, challenging Truman to a debate on the issue. Thurmond carried four states and received 39 electoral votes, but Truman was reelected.

During the campaign, Thurmond said in a speech met with loud cheers by his assembled supporters:

I wanna tell you, ladies and gentlemen, that there's not enough troops in the army to force the Southern people to break down segregation and admit the Nigra race into our theaters, into our swimming pools, into our homes, and into our churches. (Note: Standard accounts of the speech render "Nigra" as "Negro" or "nigger".)

=== 1950 U.S. Senate campaign in South Carolina ===
According to term limits in the state constitution, Thurmond was barred from seeking a second consecutive term as governor in 1950, so he mounted a Democratic primary challenge against first-term U.S. senator Olin Johnston. On May 1, Thurmond's Senate campaign headquarters opened in Columbia, South Carolina with Ernest Craig serving as campaign leader and George McNabb in charge of public relations; both men were on leave from their state positions in the governor's office.

In the one-party state of the time, the Democratic primary was the only competitive contest. Both candidates denounced President Truman during the campaign. Johnston defeated Thurmond 186,180 votes to 158,904 votes (54% to 46%) in what would be Thurmond's first and only state electoral defeat.

In 1952, Thurmond endorsed Republican Dwight Eisenhower for the presidency, rather than the Democratic nominee Adlai Stevenson. Stevenson still narrowly carried South Carolina, traditionally Democratic, in the general election.

== U.S. Senate (1954–1956, 1956–2003) ==
=== 1950s ===
The incumbent U.S. senator from South Carolina, Burnet R. Maybank, was unopposed for re-election in 1954, but he died two months before election day. The state Democratic Party selected Edgar A. Brown to replace Maybank without conducting a primary election.

Thurmond organized a write-in campaign for the vacant Senate seat. He pledged that if he won, he would resign in 1956 to force a primary election. Easily winning the 1954 election, he was the first person to be elected to the U.S. Senate as a write-in candidate. (Note: It has only been repeated once, in 2010, by Lisa Murkowski.) In January 1955, Thurmond expressed his view that federal encroachment on states' rights was among the biggest threats to American life and violated the Constitution. In July, Thurmond supported the Republican Eisenhower Administration's bill for an expanded military reserve law over the alternate plan proposed by fellow Democratic Senator Richard Russell.

Thurmond co-wrote the first version of the Southern Manifesto, stating disagreement with the 1954 U.S. Supreme Court ruling in Brown v. Board of Education that declared that segregated public schools were unconstitutional and ordered them integrated. In early 1956, Thurmond resigned from the Senate, keeping the promise he had made two years earlier. He won the primary as well as the general election unopposed. Thereafter, he returned to the Senate in November 1956.

In 1957, the Eisenhower administration introduced an amended version of the Civil Rights Bill, imposing expansion of federal supervision of integration in Southern states. In an unsuccessful attempt to prevent the bill's passage, Thurmond filibustered the bill, speaking for a total of 24 hours and 18 minutes, the longest recorded filibuster speech by a lone senator. Other Southern senators, who had agreed as part of a compromise not to filibuster this bill, were upset with Thurmond because they thought his defiance made them look incompetent to their constituents. Despite his efforts, the Congress passed the Civil Rights Act of 1957 on August 29. During his filibuster, Thurmond relied on the book The Case for the South, written by W. D. Workman Jr.; Thurmond had known the author for fifteen years. Workman had covered both Thurmond's tenure as South Carolina governor and his presidential campaign, in addition to having served in the military unit which Thurmond had organized in Columbia. He had turned down an offer by Thurmond to serve as his Washington, DC office press secretary.

Thurmond sent a copy of The Case for the South to each of his Senate colleagues and then-vice president Richard Nixon. The book was described in 2013 by Loyola history professor and author Elizabeth Shermer as "a compendium of segregationist arguments that hit all the high points of regional apologia".

In January 1959, the Senate held a debate over changing the rules to curb filibusters. Thurmond expressed the view that the Senate should return to the rule prior to 1917, when there were no regulations on the time for debate.

=== 1960s ===
In February 1960, Thurmond requested a quorum call that would produce at least half the membership of the Senate, the call being seen as one of the delay tactics employed by Southerners during the meeting. 51 senators assembled, allowing the Senate to adjourn in spite of Thurmond's calls for another quorum call. Thurmond afterward denied his responsibility in convening the Saturday session, attributing it to Democrat Lyndon B. Johnson. He said that those insistent on passing a civil rights bill should be around during discussions on the matter. In the 1960 United States presidential election, Thurmond refused to back the Democratic nominee, his Senate colleague John F. Kennedy, due to the latter's support for civil rights. In the 1960 South Carolina Senate race, Thurmond ran unopposed in the general election; no Republican candidate was on the ballot. Until 2026, 1960 was the last time a Democrat won South Carolina's Class 2 Senate seat. In the presidential election, Thurmond received 14 electoral votes for vice president (as Harry Byrd Sr.'s running mate). Though both Byrd and Thurmond had long since moved on from the States Rights' Democratic Party, they were the decided protest ticket of several Southern delegates and unpledged electors, who refused to give their support to Kennedy.

Thurmond predicted the 87th Congress would begin with a move to remove him from the Senate Democratic Caucus. This did not happen, and an aide for Senator Joseph S. Clark Jr. said there was never an intention to pursue recourse against Thurmond, though in his opinion Thurmond should no longer be a member of the party.

In August 1961, Thurmond formally requested the Senate Armed Services Committee to vote on whether to vote for "a conspiracy to muzzle military anti-Communist drives." The appearance prompted the cancellation of another public appearance in Fort Jackson, as Thurmond favored marking his proposal with his presence, and his request for a $75,000 committee study was slated for consideration. In November, Thurmond said that President Kennedy had lost support in the South due to the formation of the National Relations Boards, what he called Kennedy's softness on communism, and an increase in military men being muzzled for speaking out against communism.

In May 1962, Thurmond was part of a group of Senate orators headed by John C. Stennis who expressed opposition to the Kennedy administration's literacy test bill, arguing that the measure was in violation of states' rights as defined by the Constitution. The bill was an effort to reduce the use of discriminatory and subjective literacy tests in the South; ostensibly used to establish voters' competency, in practice they were used against African-American voters and preventing their registration. After the Supreme Court ruled state composed prayer in public schools was unconstitutional, Thurmond urged Congress to take steps to prevent the Court from making similar decisions. In September 1962, Thurmond called for an invasion of Cuba. In February 1963, Thurmond stated that "the brush curtain around Cuba is a formidable Soviet strategic military base" and estimated between 30,000 and 40,000 Cuban troops were under the leadership of a Soviet general. Hours after the statement was made public, a Pentagon official disputed his claims as being "at wide variance with carefully evaluated data collected by U.S. intelligence" and called for Thurmond to release his proof to the Defense Department. During Paul Nitze's nomination hearing for Secretary of the Navy, Thurmond was noted for asking "rapid fire questions" on military action and focusing on Nitze's participation as a moderator in the 1958 National Council of Churches conference. Along with Arizona Senator Barry Goldwater, Thurmond delayed the Nitze nomination. In spite of Thurmond voting against him, the nomination was approved.

The day after the Nitze vote, President Kennedy was assassinated in Dallas, Texas. Thurmond expressed the view that a conspiracy would be found by investigators to have been responsible for JFK's death. Vice President Lyndon B. Johnson ascended to the presidency. He began campaigning to secure passage of the Civil Rights Act of 1964 and the Voting Rights Act of 1965, which angered white segregationists. These laws ended segregation and committed the federal government to enforce voting rights of citizens by the supervision of elections in states in which the pattern of voting showed black people had been disenfranchised. During the signing ceremony for the Civil Rights Act, President Johnson nominated LeRoy Collins as the first Director of the Community Relations Service. Subsequently, Thurmond reminded Collins of his past support for segregation and implied that he was a traitor to the South, Thurmond having particular disdain for an address by Collins the previous winter in which he charged Southern leaders with being harsh and intemperate. Thurmond also suggested that Collins had sought to fault southern leaders for President Kennedy's assassination. Thurmond was the only senator to vote against Collins' nomination being sent to the Senate, and later one of eight senators to vote against his nomination in the chamber.

==== Party switch ====
On September 16, 1964, Thurmond confirmed he was leaving the Democratic Party to work on the presidential campaign of Barry Goldwater, charging the Democrats with having "abandoned the people" and having repudiated the U.S. Constitution. During the campaign, Thurmond told reporters that he believed Barry Goldwater could carry South Carolina and other southern states. Though Goldwater lost in a landslide, he won South Carolina with 59% of the vote compared to President Johnson's 41%. Senate Republicans were lukewarm to Thurmond due to their "super minority" of only 32 seats in the Senate prior to Thurmond's switch, and voted for committee assignments granting Thurmond the ability "to keep at least some of the seniority power he had gained as a Democrat." Following the election, Johnson continued to push through Civil Rights legislation, most notably the Voting Rights Act in 1965, which committed the federal government to enforce voting rights of citizens by the supervision of elections in states with noted record of voter suppression and disenfranchisement. Thurmond explained his opposition to the Voting Rights Act as being opposed to its authorization of the federal government to determine the processes behind how statewide elections are conducted and insisted he was not against black voter turnout. During floor debate on the bill, Thurmond espoused that the VRA would lead to "despotism and tyranny." With the Voting Rights Act passing into law by a slightly larger margin than the Civil Rights Act, Thurmond's opposition to civil rights had proven as ineffective as a Republican as it had been as a Democrat.

In 1965, L. Mendel Rivers became chairman of the House Armed Services Committee, commentator Wayne King crediting Thurmond's involvement with Rivers as giving Rivers' district "an even dozen military installations that are said to account for one‐third to one‐half of the jobs in the area." In his 1966 re-election campaign, the new Republican senator faced no opposition in the primary, and competed against Bradley Morrah Jr. in the general election campaign. Morrah avoided direct charges against Thurmond's record and generally spoke of his own ambitions in the event he was elected, later referring to Thurmond's time in the Senate as being ineffective. Thurmond won election with 62.2 percent of the vote (271,297 votes) to Morrah's 37.8 percent (164,955 votes). In 1966, former governor Ernest "Fritz" Hollings won South Carolina's other Senate seat in a special election. He and Thurmond served together for just over 36 years, making them the longest-serving Senate duo in American history.

At the start of the 89th United States Congress, Thurmond was appointed to the Senate Judiciary subcommittee on Constitutional Rights. In March, Thurmond won unanimous approval to have Clark's remarks removed from the record following an argument the senators had after Clark mentioned that Charleston, South Carolina would be included in the Pentagon's list of twenty-five American cities that would get priority in their antimissile protection and attributed this to House Armed Services Committee Chairman Rivers' influence. In June 1967, Johnson nominated Thurgood Marshall to be the first African-American Justice on the Supreme Court, Thurmond joined Sam Ervin, Spessard Holland, and James Eastland in calling Marshall a "Constitutional iconoclast" in Senate debate. Thurmond questioned Marshall for an hour "on fine points of constitutional law and history", and accused Marshall of having evaded questions on his legal principles during committee hearings. Marshall was still confirmed by the Senate at the end of that month. Later that year, Thurmond attributed the 1967 USS Forrestal fire to being precipitated by communists, and warned against enacting any of the three proposed Panama Canal treaties on the grounds that they would lead to Communist control of the waterway if enacted.

In 1968, Chief Justice Earl Warren decided to retire, and Johnson subsequently nominated Abe Fortas to succeed him. On the third day of hearings, Thurmond questioned Fortas over Mallory v. United States (1957), a case taking place before Fortas's tenure, but for which he was nonetheless held responsible by Thurmond. Thurmond asked Fortas if the Supreme Court decision in the Mallory v. United States case was an encouragement of individuals to commit serious crimes such as rape and if he believed in "that kind of justice", an inquiry that shocked even the usually stoic Fortas. Thurmond displayed sex magazines, which he called "obscene, foul, putrid, filthy and repulsive", to validate his charges that Supreme Court rulings overturning obscenity convictions had led to a large wave of hardcore pornography material. Thurmond stated that Fortas had backed overturning 23 of the 26 lower court obscenity decisions. Thurmond also arranged for the screening of explicit films that Fortas had purportedly legalized to be played before reporters and his own Senate colleagues. In September, Vice President Hubert Humphrey spoke of a deal made between Thurmond and Nixon over Thurmond's opposition to the Fortas nomination. Both Nixon and Thurmond denied Humphrey's claims, Thurmond saying that he had never discussed the nomination with Nixon while conceding the latter had unsuccessfully tried to sway him from opposing Fortas.

In the lead-up to the 1968 United States Presidential election, Thurmond stated that President Johnson could be defeated in a re-election bid by a Republican challenger since the candidate was likely to be less obnoxious than the president. Thurmond was an early supporter of a second presidential campaign by Nixon, his backing coming from the latter's position on the Vietnam War, Thurmond promising Nixon that he would not give in to the "depredations of the Reagan forces." During the general election campaign, Nixon's running mate Spiro Agnew stated that he did not believe Thurmond was a racist when asked his opinion on the matter, and Thurmond participated in a two-day tour of Georgia during October where he warned that American Independent Party candidate George Wallace would split the vote and give the election to Democratic nominee Hubert Humphrey by having the Democratic-majority House of Representatives select him in the event none of the candidates received enough electoral votes to win the presidency outright. Thurmond also predicted that Nixon would carry Virginia, South Carolina, North Carolina, Florida, Texas and Tennessee. Nixon carried each of these states with the exception of Texas.

Thurmond decried the Supreme Court opinion in Alexander v. Holmes County Board of Education (1969), which ordered the immediate desegregation of schools in the American South. This had followed continued Southern resistance for more than a decade to desegregation following the 1954 U.S. Supreme Court ruling in Brown v. Board of Education that segregation of public schools was unconstitutional. Thurmond praised President Nixon and his "Southern Strategy" of delaying desegregation, saying Nixon "stood with the South in this case". In 1969, Thurmond opined that The New York Times "had a conflict of interest in its attacks on Otto F. Otepka's appointment to the Subversive Activities Control Board." and called for Associate Justice William O. Douglas to resign over what he considered political activities, a request which Douglas ignored. In the latter part of the year, President Nixon nominated Clement Haynsworth for associate justice. This came after the White House consulted with Thurmond throughout all of July, as Thurmond had become impressed with Haynsworth following their close collaboration. Thurmond wrote to Haynsworth that he had worked harder on his nomination than any other that had occurred since his Senate career began. The Haynsworth nomination was rejected in the Senate. Years later, at a 1977 hearing, Thurmond told Haynsworth, "It's a pity you are not on the Supreme Court today. Several senators who voted against you have told me they would vote for you if they had it to do again."

In 1969, Time ran a story accusing Thurmond of receiving "an extraordinarily high payment for land". Thurmond responded to the claim by calling the tale a liberal smear intended to damage his political influence, later calling the magazine "anti-South". A few days later, Thurmond named executive director of the South Carolina Democratic Party Donald L. Fowler as the individual who had spread the story, a charge that Fowler denied.

=== 1970s ===
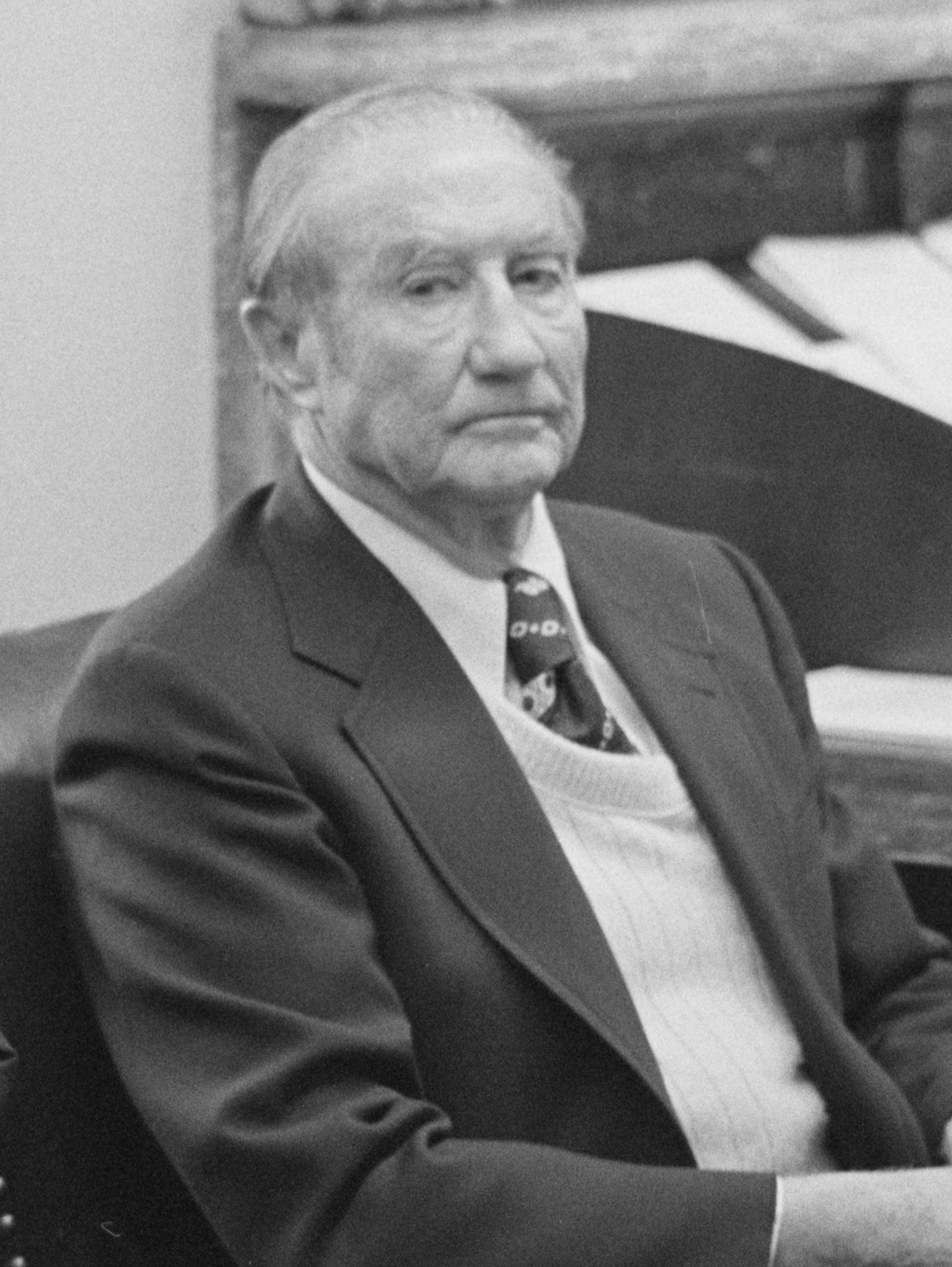
Thurmond in 1979

In 1970, African-Americans constituted about 30 percent of South Carolina's population. After the Voting Rights Act of 1965, African Americans were legally protected in exercising their constitutional rights to register and vote in South Carolina. Thurmond appointed Thomas Moss, an African American, to his Senate staff in 1971. It has been described as the first such appointment by a member of the South Carolina congressional delegation (it was incorrectly reported by many sources as the first senatorial appointment of an African American, but Mississippi Senator Pat Harrison had hired clerk-librarian Jesse Nichols in 1937). In 1983, Thurmond supported legislation to make the birthday of Martin Luther King Jr. a federal holiday. In South Carolina, the honor was diluted; until 2000 the state offered employees the option to celebrate this holiday or substitute one of three Confederate holidays instead. Despite this, Thurmond never explicitly renounced his earlier views on racial segregation.

In January 1970, Thurmond asserted that he would work "to reverse the unreasonable and impractical decisions of the Supreme Court", as well as assist with the appointment of "sound judges" and uphold the Nixon administration's position for resumption of tax‐exempt status among all private schools. In a 1970 speech, Thurmond called on Japan to increase defense spending and take a larger role in resisting communism in Asia. Thurmond also defended the Vietnam policy of the Nixon administration, saying that the president was making the best of the situation that he had inherited from Kennedy and Johnson while admitting he personally favored a total victory in the war. On April 11, 1971, Thurmond called for the exoneration of William Calley following his conviction of participating in the My Lai massacre, stating that the "victims at Mylai were casualties to the brutality of war" and Calley had acted off of order. Calley's petition for habeas corpus was granted three years later, in addition to his immediate release from house arrest. In January 1975, Thurmond and William Scott toured South Vietnam, Thurmond receiving a medal from President of South Vietnam Nguyễn Văn Thiệu. The award was seen as part of an attempt by South Vietnam to court American congressional votes in its favor.

In February 1971, Senate Republicans voted unanimously to bestow Thurmond full seniority, the vote being seen as "little more than a gesture since committee assignments are the major item settled by seniority and Senator Thurmond has his." In June, Thurmond advocated against lifting the trade embargo on the People's Republic of China, stating that its communist regime had engaged in a propaganda effort to weaken support for the embargo. Nevertheless, days later, President Nixon ordered an end to the embargo.

On February 4, 1972, Thurmond sent a secret memo to William Timmons (in his capacity as an aide to Richard Nixon) and United States Attorney General John N. Mitchell, with an attached file from the Senate Internal Security Subcommittee, urging that British musician John Lennon (then living in New York City) be deported from the United States as an undesirable alien, due to Lennon's political views and activism. The document claimed Lennon's influence on young people could affect Nixon's chances of re-election, and suggested that terminating Lennon's visa might be "a strategy counter-measure". Thurmond's memo and attachment, received by the White House on February 7, 1972, initiated the Nixon administration's persecution of John Lennon that threatened the former Beatle with deportation for nearly five years from 1972 to 1976. The documents were discovered in the FBI files after a Freedom of Information Act search by Professor Jon Wiener, and published in Weiner's book Gimme Some Truth: The John Lennon FBI Files (2000). They are discussed in the documentary film, The U.S. vs. John Lennon (2006).

In July 1973, Thurmond was one of ten Republican senators in a group headed by Carl T. Curtis invited to the White House to reaffirm their support for President Nixon in light of recent scandals and criticism of the president within his own party. In October, after President Nixon ordered the firing of independent special prosecutor Archibald Cox, Democrat Birch Bayh charged Thurmond with "browbeating" Cox during Senate Judiciary Committee hearings on the firing. Thurmond replied that Bayh was "below a snake" in the event that he had intended to impugn his motives. Thurmond was noted for joining Edward J. Gurney in questioning Cox "at length in an attempt to show that he was biased against" Nixon and his administration, as Thurmond asked Cox if eleven members of his staff had worked for Presidents Kennedy and Johnson. In May 1974, Thurmond, along with William L. Scott and James B. Allen agreed with Senator Carl T. Curtis on the equation of resignation with mob rule and the group declined defending Nixon's conduct. Thurmond opined that Nixon was "the only President we have" and questioned why Congress would want to weaken his hand in negotiating with other countries. In August, Newsweek published a list by the White House including Thurmond as one of thirty-six senators that the administration believed would support President Nixon in the event of his impeachment and being brought to trial by the Senate. Nixon resigned on August 9 in light of near-certain impeachment.

Throughout the 1970s, Thurmond took several actions against the Soviet Union. In June 1974, Senator Henry M. Jackson informed Chairman of the Senate Armed Services Committee John C. Stennis that he had arranged for Thurmond to cosponsor an amendment revising the present export control system and restricting trade with the Soviet Union while granting the Defense Secretary power to veto any export that might "significantly increase the military capability" of either the Soviet Union or other Communist countries. In June 1975, as the Senate weighed a reduction in a $25 billion weapons procurement measure and to delete research funds to improve the accuracy and power of intercontinental ballistic missiles and warheads, Thurmond and Harry F. Byrd Jr. warned that the Soviet Union was attempting an increase on its missile accuracy and advocated for the United States to follow suit with its own missiles. Later that month, Thurmond and Jesse Helms wrote to President Ford requesting he meet with Aleksandr Solzhenitsyn ahead of a speech on June 30 during an AFL–CIO dinner. The White House responded that Ford was too busy to meet with Solzhenitsyn, while later sources indicate Ford declined the meeting at the counsel of his advisors. In December 1979, Thurmond was one of ten senators on the Senate Armed Services Committee to sign a report urging President Carter to delay the vote on a proposed treaty between the US and Soviet Union to limit nuclear arms.

In the 1976 Republican primary, President Ford faced a challenge from former California Governor Ronald Reagan, who selected Richard Schweiker as his running mate. Though Thurmond backed Reagan's candidacy, he, along with North Carolina Senator Jesse Helms, led efforts to oust Schweiker from the ticket. During the subsequent general election, Thurmond appeared in a campaign commercial for incumbent U.S. President Gerald Ford in his race against Thurmond's fellow Southerner, former Georgia Governor Jimmy Carter. In the commercial, Thurmond said Ford (who was born in Nebraska and spent most of his life in Michigan) "sound[ed] more like a Southerner than Jimmy Carter". After President-elect Carter nominated Theodore C. Sorensen as his choice to become Director of the Central Intelligence Agency, Thurmond expressed reservations and fellow Senator Jake Garn said he believed Thurmond would not vote for the nomination. Sorensen withdrew from consideration days later, before a vote could be had.

In 1974, Thurmond and Democrat John L. McClellan wrote a resolution to continue American sovereignty by the Panama Canal and zone. Thurmond stated that the rhetoric delivered by Secretary of State Henry Kissinger suggested that the "Canal Zone is already Panamanian territory and the only question involved is the transfer of jurisdiction." In the late 1970s, Thurmond advocated for forging a new relationship with Panama but against the U.S. giving up sovereignty to the Canal Zone. Thurmond doubted Panama's ability to govern alone: "There is no way that a Panamanian government could be objective about the administration of an enterprise so large in comparison to the rest of the national enterprise, public and private." In late August 1977, The New York Times wrote "President Carter can be grateful that the opposition to his compromise Panama treaty is now being led by Senator Strom Thurmond of South Carolina and Senator Jesse Helms of North Carolina." Speaking on the Panama Canal neutrality treaty, Thurmond said it was "the big giveaway of the century." The treaty was ratified by the Senate on March 16, 1978.

In his general election campaign, Thurmond faced Charles Ravenel, a local banker and former gubernatorial candidate. Ravenel charged Thurmond with not standing up for South Carolina's educational needs and having been behind the lack of funding. Thurmond responded to the charges by stating that he thought the state had made advancements in its education system. Thurmond and Ravenel made a joint appearance in April, where Thurmond discussed his position on a variety of issues. The higher amount of African-Americans voting in elections was taken into account by the Ravenel campaign, which sought to gain this group of voters by reviving interest in older statements by Thurmond. In his courting of black voters, Thurmond was noted to have not undergone "any ideological transformation" but instead devoted himself to making personal contact with members of the minority group. Thurmond's influence in national politics allowed him to have correspondence with staffers from the Nixon administration which gave him "a unique advantage in announcing federal grants and bird-dogging federal projects of particular interest to black voters." By May 1978, Thurmond held a 30-point lead over Ravenel among double digits of undecided voters. Thurmond won a sixth term with 351,733 votes to Ravenel's 281,119. The race would later be assessed as the last serious challenge to Thurmond during his career.

In March 1979, after the Carter administration made an appeal to Congress for new powers to aid with the enforcement of federal laws as it pertains to housing discrimination, Thurmond refused to back the administration as he charged it with "injecting itself in every facet of people's lives" and said housing disputes should be settled in court. In July, as the Senate weighed voting on the nomination of Assistant Attorney General Patricia M. Wald to the United States Court of Appeals in Washington, Thurmond joined Paul Laxalt and Alan Simpson in recording their opposition. Later that month, Thurmond asked Attorney General nominee Benjamin R. Civiletti if President Carter had made him give a pledge of loyalty or an assurance of complete independence. In September, the Senate Judiciary Committee approved 30 of President Carter's nominees, the closest vote being waged against Abner J. Mikva, who the president had nominated for the United States Court of Appeals for the District of Columbia. Thurmond was one of the five Republicans to vote against Mikva. In November, President Carter nominated José A. Cabranes to fill a vacancy on the United States District Court for the District of Connecticut. Thurmond submitted a series of written questions to Cabranes, whose answers were credited with clarifying his views on issues. Cabranes was confirmed for the position.

Thurmond demonstrated several instances of bipartisanship with Democrats and President Carter. In May 1977, Thurmond made a joint appearance with President Carter in the Rose Garden in a show of unified support for proposed foreign intelligence surveillance legislation. Thurmond stated he had become convinced the legislation was needed from his service on the Armed Services Committee, the Judiciary Committee and the Intelligence Committee the previous year and lauded the bill for concurrently protecting the rights of Americans, as a warrant would have to be obtained from a judge in order to fulfill any inquiries. In July 1979, after the Carter administration unveiled a proposed governing charter for the FBI, Thurmond stated his support for its enactment, his backing being seen by The New York Times as an indication that the governing charter would face little conservative opposition. In September, the Senate approved Bailey Brown as Judge of the United States Court of Appeals for the Sixth Circuit. The nomination was one of the few votes in which Thurmond and Ted Kennedy joined forces in confirming. In October, President Carter signed the Federal Magistrate Act of 1979, an expansion of the jurisdiction of American magistrates in regards to civil and criminal cases. Carter noted Thurmond as one of the members of Congress who had shown leadership on the measure, without whose efforts it would have never passed.

=== 1980s ===
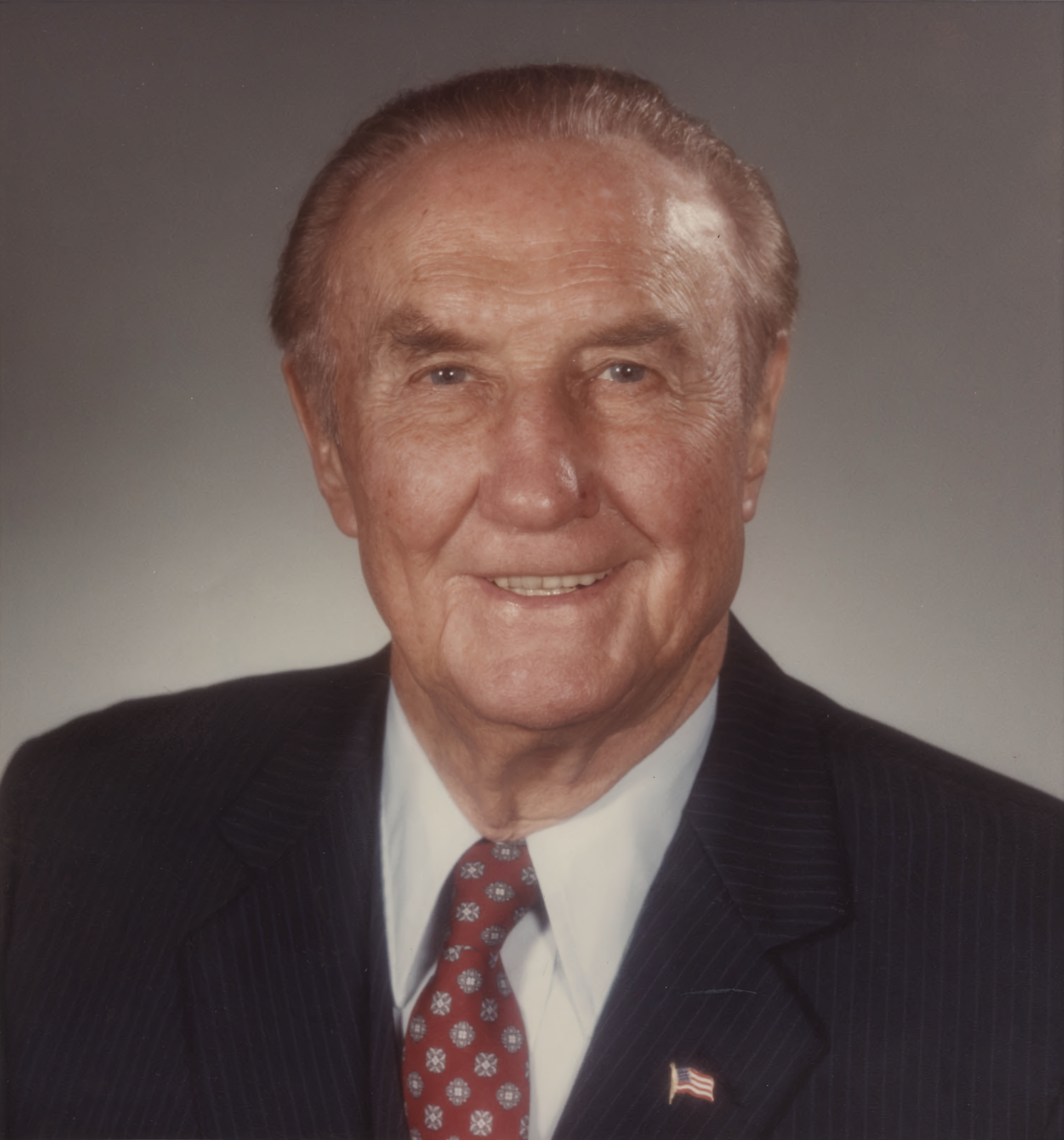
Official portrait, 1983

In December 1979, Thurmond endorsed the presidential campaign of former Governor of Texas John Connally. In an election cycle that also featured Reagan, Thurmond chose to back Connally because he believed the latter's wide government experience would benefit the U.S. in both domestic and foreign matters. The Washington Post noted Thurmond seeming "to cast himself for a role of regional leadership in the Connally campaign similar to the one he played in 1968" for the Nixon campaign. After Connally lost the South Carolina primary to Reagan, he thanked Thurmond and his wife for doing more to support his campaign in the state than anyone else. In August 1980, Thurmond gave a "tense cross examination" of President Carter's brother, Billy Carter, who had come under scrutiny for his relationship with Libya and receiving funds from the country. The Billy Carter controversy also was favored by Democrats wishing to replace Carter as the party's nominee in the general election. Thurmond questioned Carter over his prior refusal to disclose the amount of funds he had received from public appearances after the 1976 Presidential election, and stated his skepticism with some of the points made.

After Republicans won a majority in the 1980 Senate election, Thurmond pledged that he would seek a death penalty law, and stated his conviction that "the death penalty is a deterrent to crime" in an interview the following year. Following the presidential election, Thurmond and North Carolina senator Jesse Helms sponsored a Senate amendment to a Department of Justice appropriations bill denying the department the power to participate in busing, due to objections over federal involvement, but, although passed by Congress, was vetoed by a lame duck Carter. In December 1980, Thurmond met with President-elect Reagan and recommended former South Carolina governor James B. Edwards for United States Secretary of Energy in the incoming administration. Reagan later named Edwards Energy Secretary, and the latter served in that position for over a year. In January 1981, after the Justice Department revealed it was carrying out a suit against Charleston County for school officials declining to propose a desegregation method for its public schools, Thurmond theorized the Justice Department's decision may have been due to South Carolina not supporting President Carter in the general election, and stated his intent to have the incoming Reagan administration to look into the facts of the case before proceeding.

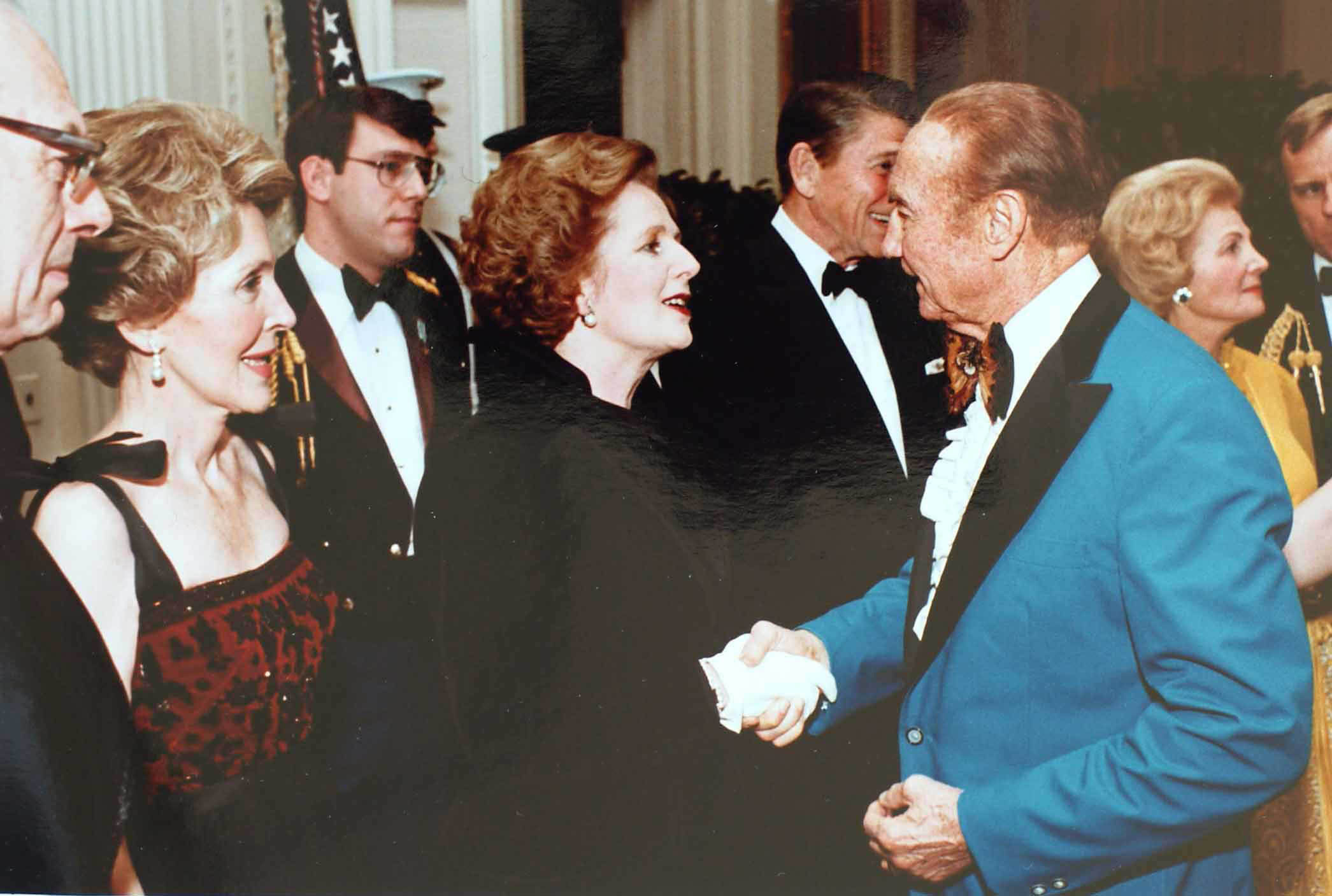
Margaret Thatcher and Thurmond at a state dinner in 1981

Thurmond became president pro tempore of the United States Senate in 1981, and was part of the U.S. delegation to the funeral of Egyptian President Anwar Sadat, Thurmond being accompanied by Sadat's pen pal Sam Brown. At the beginning of Reagan's term, Thurmond as the new chairman of the Senate Judiciary Committee and the new president were seen as obstacles to any gun laws passing in the Senate. Thurmond publicly stated his belief that any measures introduced would be defeated in his committee. After the March assassination attempt on President Reagan, Thurmond stated his support for legislation imposing a ban on the gun components on a seven-point anti-crime program. He indicated his backing would only be in favor of passing measures to restrict criminals accessing guns and his announcement was seen as possibly indicating a change in the debate of regulations relating to firearms in the U.S. Thurmond also announced plans to hold hearings on the seven-point proposal intended to address the questions surrounding the Reagan assassination attempt.

Thurmond and Helms urged President Reagan to curb textile imports, with Thurmond saying later that year that the first four months of 1981 had seen a 16 percent increase in textile imports "over a similar period in 1980." President Reagan pledged in a letter to Thurmond to help South Carolina textile mills against their foreign competitors. President Reagan stated his support for tightening control of textile imports, and the following year, vetoed H.R. 1562. Thurmond responded to the decision by stating that Reagan had heeded bad advice and added that the veto would produce "more layoffs, more plant shutdowns and more long-term economic damage to an industry that is crucial to this nation." In late 1981, Thurmond presided over the hearings of Sandra Day O'Connor, who President Reagan had nominated for associate justice. Thurmond granted Alabama Senator Jeremiah Denton an hour of questioning of O'Connor, twice the time allotted for other members of the chamber. Thurmond stated that O'Connor was "one of the choice nominees" for the Supreme Court that he had seen in all of his Senate career, and she was confirmed by the Senate. Also in 1981, Thurmond was one of the leaders in opposition to extending the Voting Rights Act, and said parts of the law were discriminatory toward states' rights as well as too strict toward communities that had adhered to it in the past.

Thurmond was a supporter of the foreign policy of the Reagan administration. In April 1981, Thurmond stated that the U.S. could move some of its West Germany soldiers to the East German and Czechoslovak borders in an attempt to improve both morale and combat readiness. In October 1983, Thurmond announced his support for the United States invasion of Grenada, saying American efforts with other countries were "providing an opportunity for Grenadan citizens to regain control over their lives" and the U.S. would be forced to watch centuries of progress crumble if the country was unwilling to make sacrifices. Thurmond voted against the Senate resolution declaring that American troops in Grenada would be "withdrawn no more than 60 days later unless Congress authorized their continued presence there". President Reagan sent Thurmond a letter containing a report in line with the War Powers Resolution. Thurmond said the "ruling junta in Grenada" was directly threatening American lives.

In 1984, during consideration of the Bankruptcy Amendments and Federal Judgeship Act of 1983 (H.R. 5174), Thurmond introduced Senate Amendment 3083, which revised the definition of "State" in Title 11 of the U.S. Code to exclude Puerto Rico and the District of Columbia from Chapter 9 municipal bankruptcy eligibility. The amendment was agreed to by the Senate and included in the final legislation (Public Law 98-353). The change removed Puerto Rico’s ability to authorize its municipalities to seek relief under Chapter 9, which legal scholarship has identified as a factor in Puerto Rico’s later fiscal crisis and the development of alternative restructuring mechanisms, including PROMESA.

In December 1984, as the United States and Israel moved to negotiate a free-trade pact where tariffs between the two countries would eventually be wiped out following the Reagan administration receiving congressional approval to negotiate such an agreement, Thurmond wrote a letter to United States trade representative Bill Brock calling on Brock to "reformulate" the negotiating position of the US as the senator had been informed by his aides that the American position in the negotiation was "more generous" than the one specified to Congress. Brock replied to Thurmond weeks later, asserting that he had "every intention" of fulfilling his commitment to Congress "to take account of the import sensitivity of specific products" in the agreement and that Israel had acknowledged the irregularity of export subsidy programs "with the concept of a free-trade area."

In 1984, as the Senate voted on a bill granting federal prosecution to weapon-carrying career robbers and giving 15 years of incarceration to those convicted, Thurmond and Democratic Senator Ted Kennedy sponsored an amendment limiting the bill to third-time federal offenders, which passed 77 to 12.

In the 1984 presidential election, Thurmond was cited along with Carroll Campbell and South Carolina Republican Party Director Warren Tompkins by Republicans as the forces binding the Reagan-Bush ticket to South Carolina's electoral votes. Thurmond attended President Reagan's October 15 re-election campaign speech in the Allied Health Building on the Greenville Technical College campus in Greenville, South Carolina.

Running for a fifth full term in 1984, Thurmond faced his first primary challenge in 20 years, from retired CIA agent Robert Cunningham, and won the Republican nomination on June 12, 1984. The previous year, at a fundraising dinner for Thurmond's re-election campaign in Columbia, South Carolina, President Reagan delivered an address both praising Thurmond and noting the similarities in his views and that of the administration. Cunningham charged Thurmond with being a follower who no one could validate the seriousness of as a candidate since he had not been challenged in eighteen years, furthering that the South Carolina Republican Party had been involved with the decline in his opposition. Cunningham said that Thurmond had a "bad track record" and noted his past comments on race, saying that he would not be crushed like Thurmond's past opponents and was getting much encouragement in his bid to unseat him. Thurmond addressed the issue of age during the primary, the 81-year-old senator stating that he exercised each day for an hour and a half and that he was in the same shape as a person in their 30s or 40s. Cunningham received less than 6% of the primary vote. Thurmond then defeated Melvin Purvis III in the general election, the latter receiving half of the votes cast for Thurmond. Purvis, noted to have few differences in ideology with Thurmond, cited the latter's age as reason to retire him from the Senate.

Thurmond's support of Reagan's judicial nominees continued into the president's second term. In 1986, Daniel Anthony Manion, President Reagan's choice for the U.S. Court of Appeals in Chicago, answered a question by Thurmond, who cited Manion as "entitled to have a vote by the Senate", and predicted there were enough votes to confirm him. In 1987, after President Reagan nominated Robert Bork as Associate Justice on the Supreme Court, the Los Angeles Times noted Thurmond as "one of Bork's key supporters on the Judiciary Committee." Following Bork's nomination being rejected by the Senate, Thurmond stated that President Reagan's next nominee should be a person not "as controversial" and should be someone from the South.

In June 1985, Thurmond introduced legislation providing stiffer federal penalties for individuals and financial institutions engaged in laundering money earned from activities of illegality. The bill was supported by the Reagan administration in its efforts to expose the financial activities of criminals and was hailed by Thurmond as "an important step in our continuing war on organized crime and those financial institutions and individuals which hide the ill-gotten assets of law-breakers, especially drug traffickers."

In September 1985, Thurmond was one of eight members of a delegation that met with General Secretary of the Communist Party of the Soviet Union Mikhail Gorbachev. In March 1986, after American warplanes took action against Libyan land, Thurmond stated the U.S. "has the right and the duty to protect and defend itself when attacked, as it was today, without provocation." He opposed statements by the Libyan government that the attacks on U.S. ships occurred in international waters and named Muammar Gaddafi as the individual who had orchestrated the acts of aggression toward the U.S. Thurmond was a supporter of the Nicaragua rebels, saying that support for the group on the part of the United States was central to furthering America's view "in freedom and in protecting ourselves against Soviet totalitarianism." In August 1988, Senator Robert Byrd presented the White House with a modified version of the Democratic proposal on Contra aid. Thurmond responded to the plan by calling it unsatisfactory. A month later, after some members of the Senate gave support to a law that would impose American participation in an international treaty outlawing genocide, Thurmond stated his intent to add a death penalty amendment in the event the bill reached the Senate floor and Democrats charged Thurmond with using parliamentary devices and Senate traditions to prevent a vote. Thurmond dropped the death penalty amendment when Democrats agreed to proceed with the confirmation of Republican judges.

In September 1986, Thurmond sponsored a drug law package that included a provision imposing the death penalty for some drug offenses and federal crimes of "treason, espionage and killing American hostages in a terrorist attack". A week later, as the Senate opened debate on proposals aimed at ending both the supply of dangerous drugs as well as their demand, Thurmond offered changes to criminal law in the form of amendments that would include imposing the death penalty for drug traffickers guilty of murder and an expansion of the proposal that would add the death penalty for other federal crimes, such as espionage and hostage taking. President Reagan signed the Anti-Drug Abuse Act of 1986 on October 27, 1986, noting Thurmond as one of the "real champions in the battle to get this legislation through Congress".

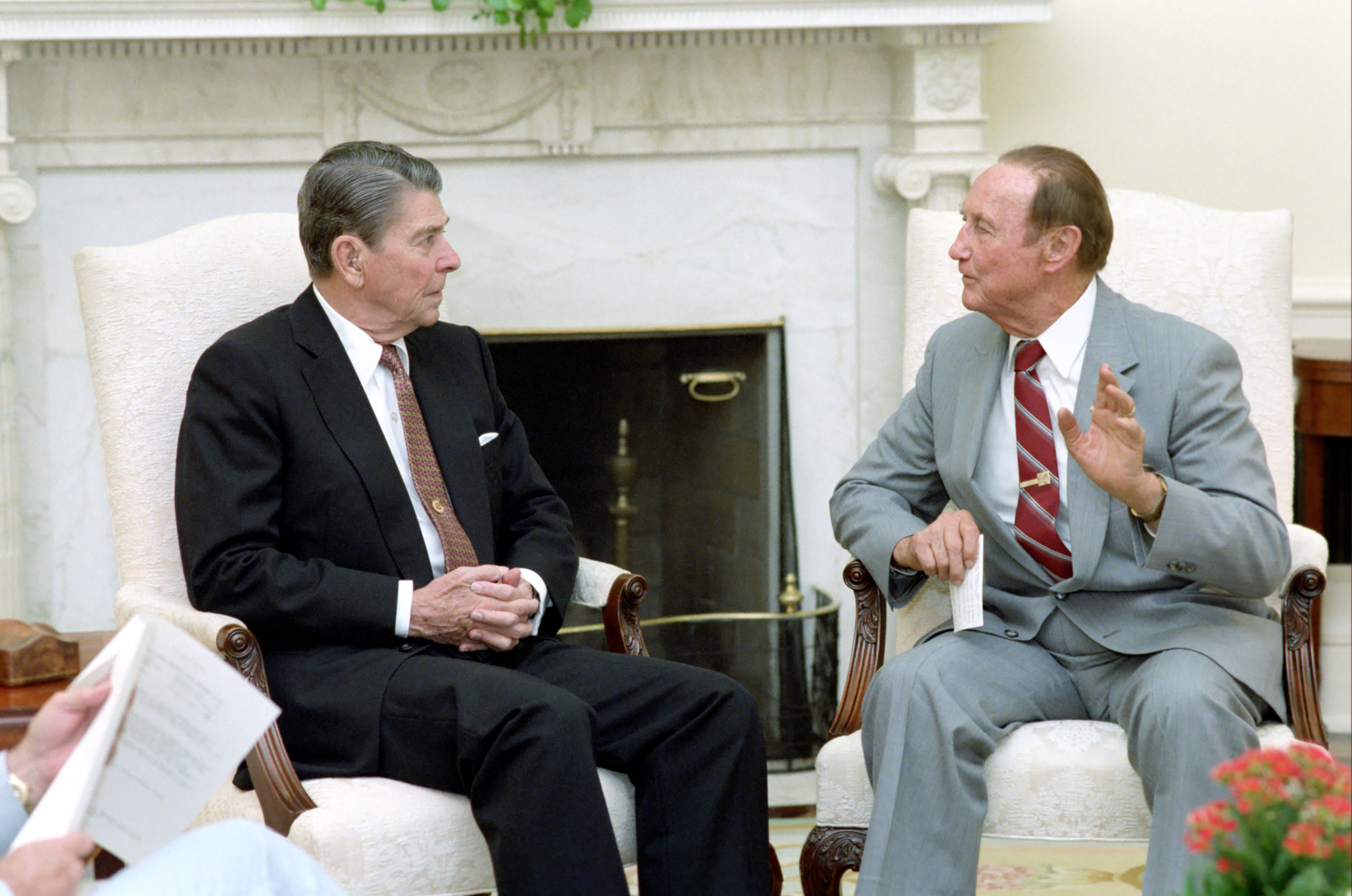
President Ronald Reagan with Thurmond in the Oval Office in 1987

In November 1987, Thurmond introduced legislation that if enacted would require "alcoholic beverages to carry health warning labels similar to those on cigarettes", saying the legislation would be effective if it prevented anyone from drinking while being in a compromising position of health. The following year, Thurmond sponsored legislation designed to impose "five rotating warning labels on alcoholic beverages cautioning pregnant women not to drink, warning that alcohol is addictive and can increase the risks of hypertension, liver disease and cancer, that it impairs a person's ability to drive a car or operate machinery, and that alcohol consumption can be hazardous in combination with some drugs."

On February 23, 1988, Thurmond endorsed fellow senator Bob Dole in the Republican presidential primary, acknowledging his previous intent to remain neutral during the nominating process. The Thurmond endorsement served to change the Dole campaign's initial plans of skipping the South Carolina primary, where Vice President Bush defeated Dole. The Bush campaign subsequently won other Southern states and the nomination, leading Michael Oreskes to reflect that Dole "was hurt by an endorsement that led him astray." Following the 1988 Presidential election, George H. W. Bush nominated John Tower for United States Secretary of Defense. After Tower's nomination was rejected by the Senate, Thurmond asked, "What does it say when the leader of the free world can't get a Cabinet member confirmed?"

In July 1989, when the Senate Judiciary Committee approved a bill by Democrat Dennis DeConcini that imposed a ban of three years on sales of several domestic assault weapons, it rejected an amendment by Thurmond that would have substituted the DeConcini bill with the Bush administration's anti-crime package, which did not include a ban on rifles produced in the United States. Failure to implement the Thurmond amendment was seen as "a preliminary test of Senate support for extending President Bush's ban on foreign-made assault weapons to domestic makes" and a loss for the National Rifle Association of America which had previously protested banning domestic assault weapons. In August, after the Senate Judiciary Committee voted evenly on the nomination of William C. Lucas for Assist Attorney General for Civil Rights and thereby terminated the nomination that required a majority to proceed to the entirety of the chamber, Thurmond noted the different forms of segregation in the North and South and added that "black people didn't have the chance in either place that they should have had. Now's the chance to give them a chance." Chairman of the Senate Judiciary Committee Joe Biden refuted Thurmond's argument by mentioning that Senate critics of Lucas were civil rights supporters who had a problem with his lack of qualifications. In September, Thurmond was one of nine Republican senators appointed by Senate Republican leader Robert Dole to negotiate a dispute with Democrats over financing of President Bush's anti-drug plan.

=== 1990s and 2000s ===
Thurmond launched his campaign for an eighth term on February 12, 1990, citing that he had never before felt "a stronger obligation to continue my work for the future of our state and our nation." Thurmond, then age 87, billed himself as having the health of a man in his fifties. The South Carolina Democratic Party faced difficulty recruiting a candidate which they believed had a chance of defeating Thurmond. In the general election, Thurmond defeated retired intelligence officer Bob Cunningham, who had been his Republican primary opponent in 1984. (Cunningham had switched parties in 1990.)

In early 1990, Thurmond sponsored a crime bill concurrent with another measure of the same intent, his version receiving the support of President Bush. Thurmond charged the Democratic proposal with aiding criminals and furthering the loss of rights on the part of victims. In June, the bill was nearly doomed following a procedural vote that forced Senate leaders to work toward modifying its provisions. Thurmond proposed that his fellow senators accept portions of the bill that the Senate had already passed including provisions expanding the number of federal crimes for which the death penalty could apply from 23 to 30 and restrictions on the number of appeals a condemned inmate may file in Federal courts, and the ban on the sale and manufacture of nine types of semiautomatic weapons. In 1992, the Senate voted on an anti-crime bill, Thurmond predicting that it would not pass due to what he considered its lack of strength: "This weak bill expands the rights of criminals. It is a fraud. It is a sham." He stated that President Bush had told him in advance of his intent to veto the bill if it passed.

After President Bush nominated Clarence Thomas for Associate Justice, Thomas visited Thurmond and stated that he had been fortunate as a result of the Civil Rights Movement assisting him in getting out of poverty, a departure from his previous position of African-Americans achieving success through hard work and individual initiative. The New York Times observed, "Judge Thomas's remarks in Mr. Thurmond's office were not in response to reporters' specific questions and were clearly intended to rebut critics, including some by members of civil rights organizations, who say he should not be confirmed because of his vociferous opposition to affirmative action and racial quotas in hiring." In September, as Thomas appeared before the Senate Judiciary Committee, Thurmond interrupted a line of questioning by Howard Metzenbaum to defend Thomas against a complaint that Thomas had answered questions about cases except for abortion. Thurmond voted for Thomas's confirmation, and the latter was confirmed by the Senate in October 1991.

Thurmond became the head of the Armed Services Committee following the 1994 Republican Revolution, in which the Republican Party gained eight seats in the Senate and gained a majority in both chambers. According to Thurmond, he had survived "a little power play" orchestrated by fellow Republicans to continue serving as Chairman. In December, after President Clinton's announcement that he would seek a $25 billion increase in defense spending over the following six years, Thurmond called it a correct move but one which validated claims that the president had hastily cut the Pentagon budget. In late 1995, Thurmond joined a bipartisan coalition of politicians in supporting a petition intending "to loosen the rules governing the prescription drug methylphenidate". The drug is commonly known by the brand name Ritalin.

In his 1996 re-election campaign, Thurmond received primary opposition from Harold G. Worley and Charlie Thompson, and the question of age appeared again, given that he was 93 years old at the time. Thurmond remarked that the issue was the only one expressed by members of the press, even as polls showed "that the vast majority of South Carolinians believe it is far past time for him to retire." Worley stated that the issue of age should be dealt with in the primary as opposed to the general election, encouraging Thurmond to be dropped as the seat's continuous nominee. In the general election, Thurmond received 53.4 percent of the vote to the 44 percent of Democrat Elliott Springs Close.

On December 5, 1996, Thurmond became the oldest serving member of the U.S. Senate, and on May 25, 1997, the longest-serving member (41 years and 10 months), casting his 15,000th vote in September 1998. In the following month, when astronaut and fellow Senator John Glenn was to embark on the Discovery at age 77, Thurmond, who was his senior by 19 years, reportedly sent him a message saying; "I want to go too." On October 17, 1998, President Bill Clinton signed the Strom Thurmond National Defense Authorization Act for Fiscal Year 1999 into law, an authorization of "appropriations for military activities of the Department of Defense, military construction, and defense activities of the Department of Energy." Clinton stated that the bill being named after Thurmond was a "well-deserved and appropriate tribute" due to his thirty-six years in the U.S. Army Reserve and his primary focus in the Senate being on U.S. national defense.

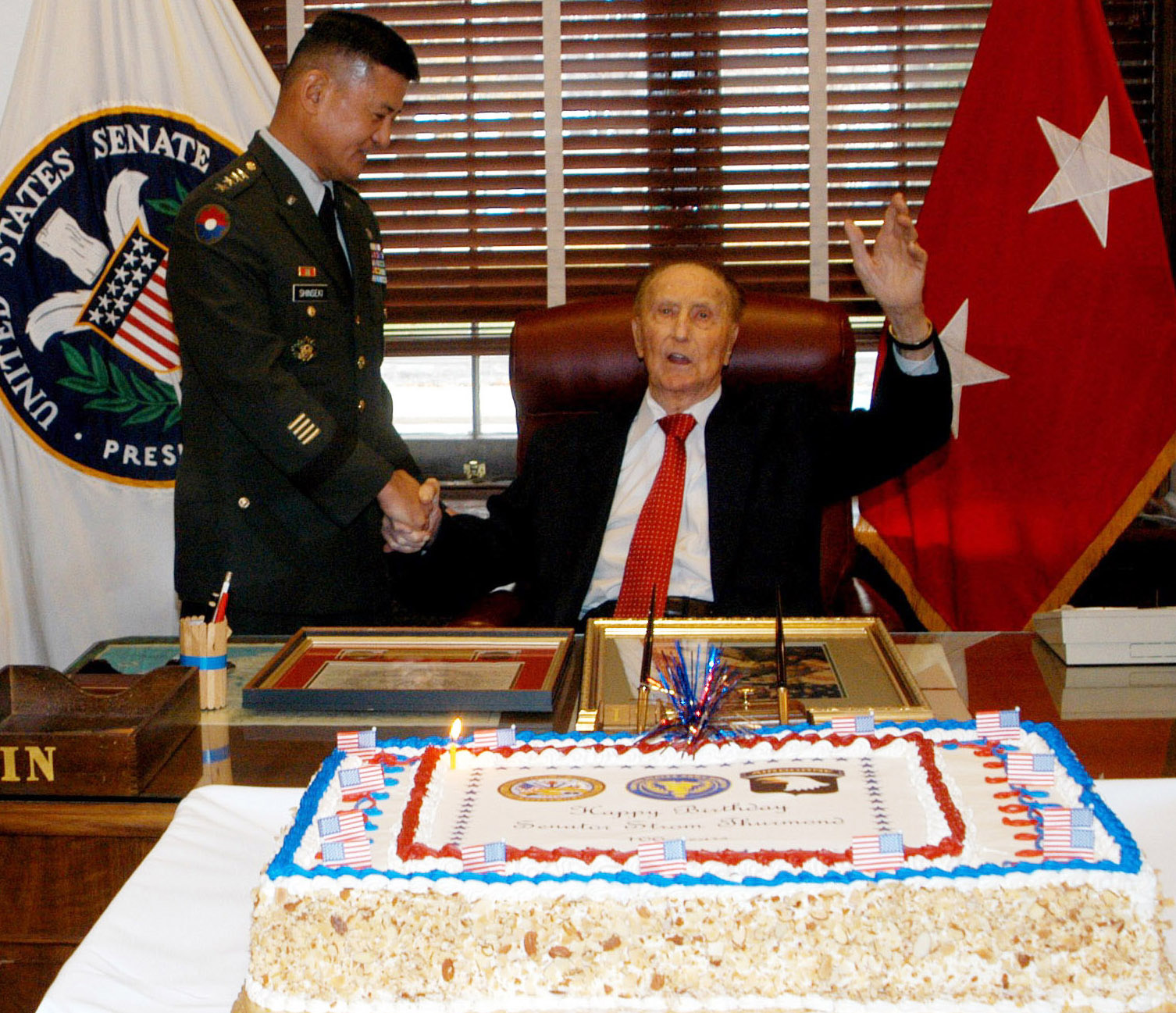
Army Chief of Staff Eric Shinseki meeting with Senator Thurmond on his 100th birthday

In February 1999, Thurmond introduced legislation barring health messages on wine bottles, the measure intended to reverse what he called "erroneous and irresponsible" action of the Bureau of Alcohol, Tobacco and Firearms. The legislation transferred authority over labeling to the Department of Health and Human Services from the Treasury Department and increased taxes on wine. On May 26, 1999, the Senate voted on an amendment to a spending bill exonerating Husband E. Kimmel and Walter C. Short of charges of failing to anticipate the attack on Pearl Harbor that led to American involvement in World War II. Thurmond was noted as one of five Senate members to have been a World War II veteran and back the measure and called Kimmel and Short "the last victims" of Pearl Harbor. In January 2001, Thurmond endorsed his son Strom Thurmond Jr. for federal prosecutor in South Carolina in a recommendation to the Senate. In March, Thurmond voted for an amendment to the campaign finance reform bill of John McCain and Russ Feingold. Thurmond had initially opposed the measure and changed his vote at the last minute.

Thurmond's 100th birthday was celebrated on December 5, 2002. Some remarks made by Mississippi Senator Trent Lott during the event were considered racially insensitive: "I want to say this about my state: When Strom Thurmond ran for president, we [Mississippi] voted for him. We're proud of it. And if the rest of the country had followed our lead, we wouldn't have had all these problems over all these years, either." Fifteen days later, on December 20, Lott resigned as the Senate Republican leader effective on January 3, 2003, the beginning of the next congressional session. Thurmond left the Senate in January 2003 as the United States' longest-serving senator, a record later surpassed by Senator Robert Byrd. Thurmond was succeeded by then-Representative and fellow Republican Lindsey Graham.

=== Health ===
Toward the end of Thurmond's Senate career, critics suggested his mental abilities had declined. His supporters argued that, while he lacked physical stamina due to his age, mentally he remained aware and attentive, and maintained a very active work schedule, showing up for every floor vote. He stepped down as Chairman of the Senate Armed Services Committee at the beginning of 1999, as he had pledged to do in late 1997. Retrospectively, a Senate aide stated that "for his last ten years, Thurmond didn't know if he was on foot or on horseback", while a 2020 New Yorker article stated that he was "widely known" by the end of his career to be non compos mentis.

External videos
- Strom Thurmond's 100th birthday party, held at the Dirksen Senate office building, December 5, 2002, C-SPAN
- Tour of Thurmond's Senate office prior to his retirement, December 19, 2002, C-SPAN

In August 1999, Thurmond underwent surgery for an enlarged prostate. In September, he was admitted to the Walter Reed Army Medical Center for tests. In October 2000, Thurmond collapsed while lunching with a staff member and an acquaintance at a restaurant in Alexandria, Virginia, and was admitted to Walter Reed; his spokeswoman Genevieve Erny stated that the collapse was found to have been unrelated to previous illnesses. On the morning of October 2, 2001, Thurmond was admitted to Walter Reed after fainting at his Senate desk. He was accompanied in the ambulance by fellow Republican and retired heart transplant surgeon Bill Frist.

== Personal life ==
Thurmond was married twice and fathered five children.

=== First daughter with Carrie Butler ===
External videos
- Essie Mae Washington-Williams news conference, December 17, 2003, C-SPAN
- After Words interview with Williams on her book Dear Senator: A Memoir by the Daughter of Strom Thurmond, February 6, 2005, C-SPAN
- Presentation by Williams at the Palm Springs Book Festival, April 16, 2005, C-SPAN

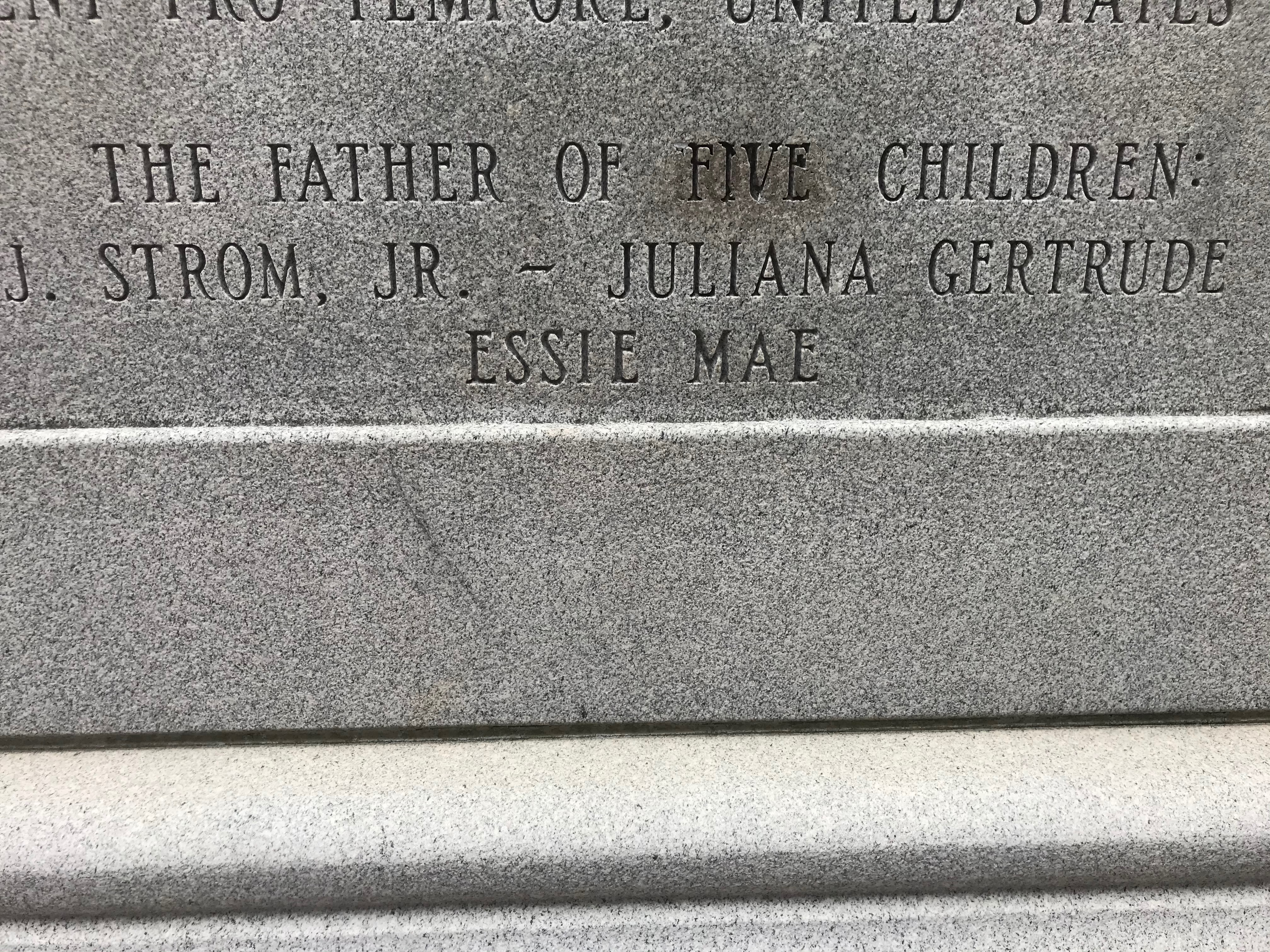
In the text accompanying Strom Thurmond's statue at the Statehouse grounds, the phrase: "The father of four children", had the "four" replaced with "five" after Thurmond's fatherhood of Essie Mae Washington-Williams became public.

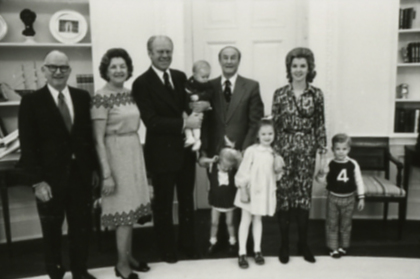
The Thurmond family with President Gerald Ford in 1976

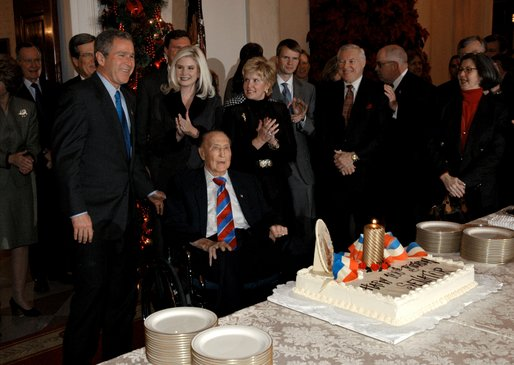
President George W. Bush with Thurmond on his 100th birthday in 2002

Six months after Thurmond's death in 2003, Essie Mae Washington-Williams (1925–2013) publicly revealed she was his daughter. She was born on October 12, 1925, to Carrie "Tunch" Butler (1909 or 1910 – 1948), who had worked for Thurmond's parents and was 15 or 16 years old when she gave birth.

Essie Mae Washington was raised by her maternal aunt and uncle, and was not told that Thurmond was her father until she was in high school, when she met him for the first time. She later married, took on the last name Washington-Williams, had a family, and retired as a Los Angeles Unified School District elementary school teacher with a master's degree. Though the Thurmond family never publicly acknowledged Washington-Williams as his daughter while he was alive, he helped pay her way through a historically black college in South Carolina and continued to give her financial support well into her adult life. Washington-Williams said she did not reveal she was Thurmond's daughter during his lifetime because it "wasn't to the advantage of either one of us". She kept silent out of respect for her father and denied the two had agreed she would not reveal her connection to him.

After Washington-Williams came forward, the Thurmond family attorney acknowledged her parentage. Her name has been added to those of his other children on a monument to Thurmond installed at the statehouse grounds. Many close friends, staff members, and South Carolina residents had long suspected that Washington-Williams was Thurmond's daughter, as they had noted his interest in her. As a young woman, she was granted a degree of access to Thurmond more typical of a family member than a member of the public.

Washington-Williams later said she intended to join the Daughters of the American Revolution, and did apply to join the United Daughters of the Confederacy, as she was eligible through her Thurmond ancestry. Thurmond was a member of the Sons of Confederate Veterans, a similar group for men. Her UDC application was not approved while she was alive.

Washington-Williams died on February 4, 2013, in Columbia, South Carolina, at age 87.

=== First marriage ===
Thurmond was 44 when he married his first wife, Jean Crouch (1926–1960), in the South Carolina Governor's mansion on November 7, 1947. In April 1947, when Crouch was a senior at Winthrop College, Thurmond was a judge in a beauty contest in which she was selected as Miss South Carolina. In June, upon her graduation, Thurmond hired her as his personal secretary. On September 13, 1947, Thurmond proposed marriage by calling Crouch to his office to take a dictated letter. The letter was to her, and contained his proposal of marriage. Crouch died of a brain tumor in 1960 at age 33; they had no children.

=== Second marriage ===
Thurmond married his second wife, Nancy Janice Moore, on December 22, 1968. He was 66 years old and she was 22. She had won Miss South Carolina in 1965. Two years later, he hired her to work in his Senate office. Although Nancy did not particularly enjoy politics, she nevertheless became a popular figure on Capitol Hill. At age 68 in 1971, Thurmond fathered the first of four children with Nancy, who was then 25. Thurmond and Nancy's children are: Nancy Moore Thurmond (1971–1993), a beauty pageant contestant who was killed by a drunk driver; James Strom Thurmond Jr. (b. 1972), a former U.S. Attorney for the District of South Carolina and Solicitor for the 2nd Judicial District of South Carolina, Juliana Whitmer (b. 1974), and Paul Reynolds Thurmond (b. 1976), a former South Carolina State Senator.

Thurmond's children remained in South Carolina with relatives, and Nancy commuted back and forth to Washington. Thurmond and Nancy separated in March 1991, after Nancy claimed that they no longer had a real marriage, stating "At this point in my life I would like to be able to pursue several career options and some measure of independence." She returned to South Carolina, where their children were living. Although Nancy casually dated other men during the early stages of the separation, neither she nor her husband considered divorce, and they reportedly remained close. It was alleged that she spoke with her husband several times each day, and he stayed at her house several times each month, whenever he returned to South Carolina. They continued attending events together. They were also reported as estranged in 1996, when Nancy was facing trial for drunk driving. In 2001, they were still reported to be estranged when Nancy refused an offer to succeed Thurmond in the U.S. Senate.

=== Sexual misconduct allegations ===
According to NBC News in 2017, it was widely acknowledged around Congress that Thurmond inappropriately touched women throughout his career. Thurmond's colleague, Senator Patty Murray, stated in 1996 that Thurmond, who was 91 years old at the time of the incident, tried to fondle her breast in an elevator. According to The New York Times, Thurmond had been known for fondling women in Senate elevators, and did not realize Murray was a fellow senator. The alleged incident prompted a statement from Thurmond's office, saying that he had not engaged in any inappropriate behavior, and that he was showing gentlemanly courtesy by assisting Murray into the elevator. Female Senate staffers from the late 1980s and early 1990s recalled that Thurmond was on an informal list of male senators who were known for harassing women regularly, such as while alone in elevators.

Political reporter Cokie Roberts said in 2017 that Thurmond kissed her on the mouth, while she was live on the air at a political convention. Roberts stated that Thurmond "was in a category of his own" when it came to politicians and sexual harassment.

== Death ==
Thurmond died from complications of old age in his sleep at 9:45 p.m. on June 26, 2003, at a hospital in his hometown of Edgefield, South Carolina. He was 100 years old. After lying in state in the rotunda of the South Carolina State House in Columbia, his body was carried on a caisson to the First Baptist Church for services, at which then-Senator Joe Biden of Delaware delivered a eulogy, and later to the family burial plot in Willowbrook Cemetery in Edgefield, where he is interred. Thurmond died on the same day that the United States Supreme Court handed down its Lawrence v. Texas decision, which legalized gay sex across all U.S. states.

== Legacy ==
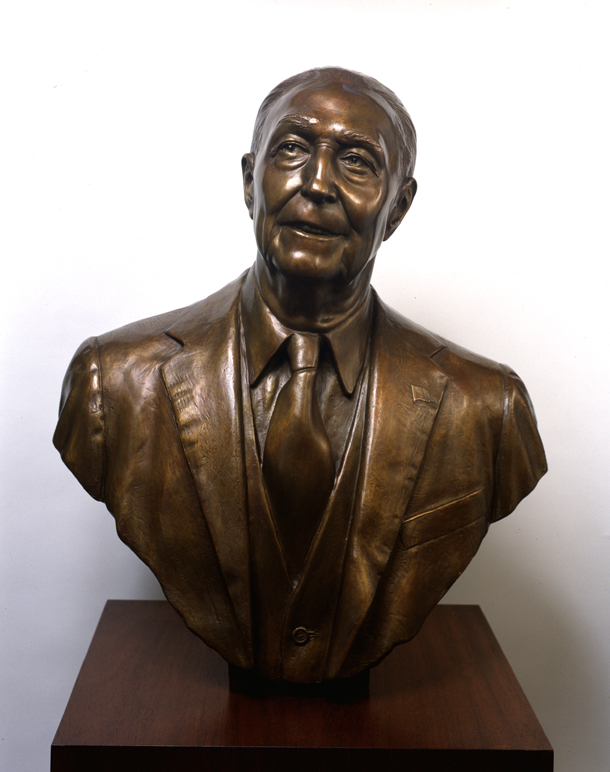
Bust of Thurmond by Frederick E. Hart, held by the U.S. Senate

Diane Norman of the Spartanburg Herald-Journal called Thurmond "a political icon depicted in life-size statues in Columbia and Edgefield and whose name graces seven public buildings, a shopping mall, a high school, a National Guard armory, a lake, a dam and an interstate highway." Former Slate senior writer Timothy Noah wrote that Thurmond's most significant political contribution was his backing of segregation and myths had been construed on the part of his contemporaries to explain his continued wielding of national influence. South Carolina Representative Joe Wilson referred to Thurmond as South Carolina's greatest statesman in the 20th century.

Time writes that Thurmond's party switch "marked the beginning of the GOP's appeal to white, Southern conservatives, and helped turn a former blue state red." It has been argued that Thurmond's backing of Nixon in the 1968 election served as the basis for the Southern strategy, with former Thurmond aide Lee Atwater admitting that the race served as the "blueprint for everything" he did in subsequent elections. Thurmond adviser Harry Dent said

He played the key and strategic role in pioneering and paving the way for that change. Presidential politics have been changed by Strom Thurmond and what he did more than by anybody in this country in these recent years.

In 1997, future Senate Majority Leader Mitch McConnell called Thurmond "somebody I have heard about, observed and admired all of my life."

=== Cultural and political image ===
Thurmond's 1948 presidential campaign positions were racist. In 1968, The New York Times described Thurmond as "a South Carolina maverick with a highly developed taste for lost causes". The Oklahoman wrote that he would anger Senate Majority Leader Lyndon Johnson because he could not be controlled and the key to Thurmond's longevity was his prioritizing of his constituents' concerns being addressed.

By the 1970s, Thurmond had helped establish scholarships for black students at four South Carolina colleges and his influence in federal bureaucracy gave him an advantage in "announcing federal grants and bird-dogging federal projects of particular interest to black voters." Thurmond received black support in his 1978 re-election and African Americans were noted to "praise their onetime nemesis as a driving force behind the influx of more federal dollars to the state's minority neighborhoods." Jim Naughton of The Washington Post found Thurmond to have "transformed his own image from radical to pragmatist, from The Whitest Man in America to Uncle Strom, Our Friend in Washington." Nevertheless, Thurmond's racially charged language during the earlier part of his career left him with a mixed reputation among African Americans, receiving only 20% of their vote in his last election in 1996. NAACP Chairman Julian Bond said Thurmond's sole legacy was of "durability and opposition to civil rights" and called Thurmond "a relic of America's shameful past, who had long overstayed his welcome." In 2003, political scientist Willie Leggett stated, "Thurmond is not going to be a hero for black people because he never became a proponent of black rights."

In 1980, Bill Peterson remarked that the 77-year-old Thurmond "still has that rare peculiar magic few politicians ever achieve" with young autograph seekers and admirers. Peterson stressed, however, that Thurmond's popularity was "being put to a severe test" in his efforts to help John Connally win the South Carolina primary.

By the time of his last campaign in 1996, Thurmond faced increased focus to his age and calls for his retirement. Thurmond opened his final campaign in a speech at the University of South Carolina-Aiken, proclaiming that he would not give up on "our mission to right the 40-year wrongs of liberalism" and that South Carolinians knew he did not like "unfinished business." As the 107th United States Congress began, the Democrats and Republicans were split evenly with Vice President Dick Cheney as the tie-breaking vote, and Thurmond's attendance was seen as crucial for maintaining a Republican majority given that his retirement or death would allow Democratic governor Jim Hodges to appoint a Democrat to his seat. Thurmond spokeswoman Genevieve Erny commented, "It's unfortunate that the media continue to portray him as in failing health, especially because the only reason the media is interested is a 50-50 split, and the repercussions that could have." In a 2001 interview, colleague Fritz Hollings said that Thurmond was no longer "mentally keen" nor did he "have a home, and someone has said the best nursing home is the U.S. Senate." Ira Shapiro of The Gazette cited Thurmond by the end of his tenure as "a joke and an embarrassment; virtually unable to speak or hear, he had to be carried into committee meetings."

After his retirement, Thurmond's early career and those of slave owner John C. Calhoun and Benjamin Tillman were cited as political symbols of South Carolina's historical racism and denial of basic civil rights to minority groups. In 2011, Public Policy Polling found Thurmond to be the most popular politician in South Carolina, with higher favorability ratings than later lawmakers Lindsey Graham, Nikki Haley, Jim DeMint, and Mark Sanford.

=== Honors ===
- The Strom Thurmond Foundation, Inc., provides financial aid support to South Carolina residents in financial need. The Foundation was established in 1974 by Thurmond with honoraria received from speeches and donations from friends and family.
- A reservoir on the Georgia–South Carolina border is named after him: Lake Strom Thurmond.
- The University of South Carolina is home to the Strom Thurmond Fitness Center, one of the largest fitness complexes on a college campus. The new complex has largely replaced the Blatt Fitness center, named for Solomon Blatt, a political rival of Thurmond.

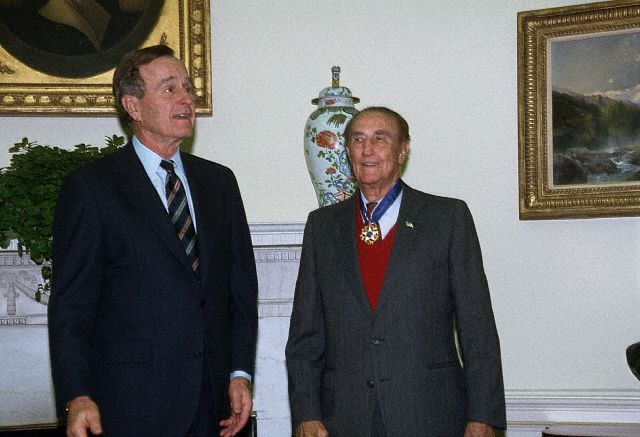
Thurmond receives the Presidential Medal of Freedom from President George H. W. Bush, 1993

- Charleston Southern University has a Strom Thurmond Building, which houses the school's business offices, bookstore, and post office.
- Thurmond Building at Winthrop University is named for him. He served on Winthrop's Board of Trustees from 1936 to 1938 and again from 1947 to 1951 when he was governor of South Carolina.
- A statue of Strom Thurmond is located on the southern grounds of the South Carolina State Capitol as a memorial to his service to the state.
- The Strom Thurmond Federal Building and United States Courthouse in Columbia, South Carolina, is named after him.
- Strom Thurmond High School is located in his hometown of Edgefield, South Carolina.
- The U.S. Air Force has a C-17 Globemaster named the Spirit of Strom Thurmond.
- The mobilization complex at Fort Bragg, North Carolina (commonly known as 'Green Ramp') is named in his honor.
- In 1989, he was presented with the Presidential Citizens Medal by President Ronald Reagan.
- Strom Thurmond Boulevard, located in Fort Jackson, South Carolina, is named in his honor.
- In 1993, he was presented with the Presidential Medal of Freedom by President George H. W. Bush.
- The Strom Thurmond Institute is located on the campus of Clemson University.

== See also ==
- List of American politicians who switched parties in office
- List of United States senators who switched parties
- List of federal political sex scandals in the United States

== Notes ==
South Carolina Senate
Preceded by Thomas Greneker	Member of the South Carolina Senate from the Edgefield County district 1933–1938	Succeeded by William Yonce
Party political offices
Preceded by Olin Johnston	Democratic nominee for Governor of South Carolina; 1946	Succeeded by James F. Byrnes
New political party	Dixiecrat nominee for President of the United States; 1948	Party dissolved
Preceded by Edgar Allan Brown	Democratic nominee for U.S. Senator from South Carolina (Class 2); 1956, 1960	Succeeded by Bradley Morrah
Vacant Title last held by Bates Gerald; 1948	Republican nominee for U.S. Senator from South Carolina (Class 2); 1966, 1972, 1978, 1984, 1990, 1996	Succeeded by Lindsey Graham
Political offices
Preceded by Ransome Judson Williams	Governor of South Carolina; 1947–1951	Succeeded by James F. Byrnes
Preceded by Warren Magnuson	President pro tempore of the United States Senate; 1981–1987	Succeeded by John C. Stennis
Preceded by Robert Byrd	President pro tempore of the United States Senate; 1995–2001	Succeeded by Robert Byrd
Preceded by Robert Byrd	President pro tempore of the United States Senate; 2001	Succeeded by Robert Byrd
U.S. Senate
Preceded by Charles E. Daniel	U.S. Senator (Class 2) from South Carolina; 1954–1956; Served alongside: Olin Johnston	Succeeded by Thomas A. Wofford
Preceded by Thomas A. Wofford	U.S. Senator (Class 2) from South Carolina; 1956–2003; Served alongside: Olin Johnston, Donald S. Russell, Fritz Hollings	Succeeded by Lindsey Graham
New office	Ranking Member of the Senate Veterans Affairs Committee; 1971–1973	Succeeded by Clifford Hansen
Preceded by Margaret Chase Smith	Ranking Member of the Senate Armed Services Committee; 1973–1979	Succeeded by John Tower
Preceded by Roman Hruska	Ranking Member of the Senate Judiciary Committee; 1977–1981	Succeeded by Joe Biden
Preceded by Ted Kennedy	Chair of the Senate Judiciary Committee; 1981–1987	Succeeded by Joe Biden
Preceded by Joe Biden	Ranking Member of the Senate Judiciary Committee; 1987–1993	Succeeded by Orrin Hatch
Preceded by John Warner	Ranking Member of the Senate Armed Services Committee; 1993–1995	Succeeded by Sam Nunn
Preceded by Sam Nunn	Chair of the Senate Armed Services Committee; 1995–1999	Succeeded by John Warner
Honorary titles
Preceded by Milton Young	Most senior Republican in the U.S. Senate; 1981–2003	Succeeded by Ted Stevens
Preceded by John C. Stennis	Dean of the United States Senate; 1989–2003	Succeeded by Robert Byrd
Preceded by John C. Stennis	Oldest United States Senator; 1989–2003	Succeeded by Robert Byrd
New title	President pro tempore emeritus of the United States Senate; 2001–2003	Succeeded by Robert Byrd
