= Paul Thurmond =

American politician (born 1976)

Member of the South Carolina Senate from the 41st district
- In office January 2013 – January 2017
- Preceded by: Walter Hundley
- Succeeded by: Sandy Senn

Personal details
- Born: Paul Reynolds Thurmond; January 9, 1976 (age 50) Aiken, South Carolina, U.S.
- Party: Republican
- Spouse: Katie Thurmond
- Children: 5
- Parent(s): Strom Thurmond; Nancy Moore Thurmond
- Relatives: James Strom Thurmond Jr. (brother); Essie Mae Washington-Williams (half-sister)
- Education: Vanderbilt University (BA); University of South Carolina (JD)
- Occupation: Attorney; Politician

Paul Reynolds Thurmond (born January 9, 1976) is an American politician from the state of South Carolina. A member of the Republican Party, Thurmond is a former member of the South Carolina Senate. He is the youngest child (and one of three surviving children) of Strom Thurmond, who served in the United States Senate for 48 years.

== Early life ==
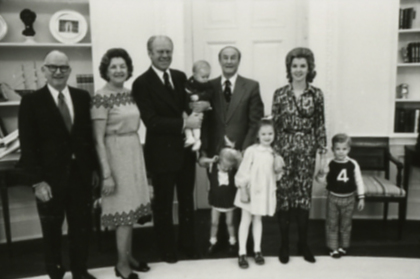
The Thurmond family with President Gerald Ford in 1976

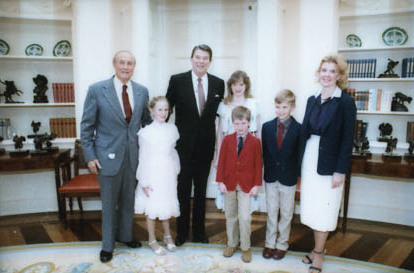
The Thurmond family with President Ronald Reagan in 1983

Paul was born to Nancy (née Moore) and Strom Thurmond on January 9, 1976, the couple's fourth child. Paul's father was 73 years old at the time of his birth. In February 1976, Strom enrolled Paul in The Citadel for a 1993 admission. He attended Aiken High School in Aiken, South Carolina, and Vanderbilt University, where he received a scholarship to play tennis. He received his Juris Doctor from the University of South Carolina School of Law.

== Career ==
Thurmond served as an assistant solicitor in the Ninth Circuit Solicitor's Office, leaving the position in 2005 to open his own law firm, formerly Thurmond Kirchner Timbes & Yelverton, P.A., now Thurmond, Kirchner, and Timbes Law Firm In 2006, he was elected to the Charleston County council. Though he initially announced he would leave politics in 2009, opting not to run for a second term as a councilman, Thurmond chose to run for a seat in the United States House of Representatives, representing South Carolina's 1st congressional district, following Henry E. Brown Jr.'s retirement in 2010. Thurmond finished second in the Republican primary, forcing a runoff election against Tim Scott. Scott defeated Thurmond in the runoff.

Thurmond ran for the South Carolina Senate in 2012 to represent the 41st district. The seat was vacated by Glenn F. McConnell, who became Lieutenant Governor of South Carolina. Thurmond defeated Walter Hundley, who succeeded McConnell in a special election held in July 2012. Thurmond won the general election, defeating Paul Tinkler, a Charleston City Councilman and member of the Democratic Party, on November 6, 2012.

In the aftermath of the shooting at the Emanuel African Methodist Episcopal church in Charleston, in which nine people —including Thurmond's colleague Clementa Pinckney — were killed, Thurmond called for the Confederate flag to be permanently removed from the grounds of the State House in July 2015.

Thurmond did not seek re-election in 2016. The American Conservative Union gave him an 88% evaluation, and the Club for Growth gave him a 90% evaluation.

== Personal life ==
Thurmond has a wife, Katie, three sons, and two daughters. One of four siblings, he was also the half-brother (through his father) of the late Essie Mae Washington-Williams, who was 50 years his senior.

== Electoral history ==
South Carolina's 1st congressional district Republican primary, 2010
| Party | Candidate | Votes | % |
|---|---|---|---|
| Republican | Tim Scott | 25,457 | 31.49% |
| Republican | Paul Thurmond | 13,149 | 16.26% |
| Republican | Carroll Campbell III | 11,665 | 14.43% |
| Republican | Larry Kobrovsky | 8,521 | 10.54% |
| Republican | Stovall Witte | 7,192 | 8.90% |
| Republican | Clark B. Parker | 6,769 | 8.37% |
| Republican | Katherine Jenerette | 3,849 | 4.76% |
| Republican | Mark Lutz | 3,237 | 4.00% |
| Republican | Ken Glasson | 1,006 | 1.24% |
| Total votes | | 80,845 | 100.00% |

South Carolina's 1st congressional district Republican primary runoff, 2010
| Party | Candidate | Votes | % |
|---|---|---|---|
| Republican | Tim Scott | 46,885 | 68.36% |
| Republican | Paul Thurmond | 21,706 | 31.64% |
| Total votes | | 68,591 | 100.00% |

South Carolina's 41st State Senate district special Republican primary, 2012
| Party | Candidate | Votes | % |
|---|---|---|---|
| Republican | Paul Thurmond | 1,549 | 42.7% |
| Republican | Walter Hundley | 1,352 | 37.3% |
| Republican | Wally Burbage | 725 | 20.0% |
| Total votes | | 3,626 | 100.00% |

South Carolina's 41st State Senate district special Republican primary runoff, 2012
| Party | Candidate | Votes | % |
|---|---|---|---|
| Republican | Paul Thurmond | 1,783 | 71.0% |
| Republican | Walter Hundley | 727 | 29.0% |
| Total votes | | 2,510 | 100.00% |

South Carolina's 41st State Senate district general election, 2012
| Party | Candidate | Votes | % |
|---|---|---|---|
| Republican | Paul Thurmond | 27,845 | 55.73% |
| Democratic | Paul Tinkler | 22,039 | 44.11% |
| Write-in | | 84 | 0.16% |
| Total votes | | 49,968 | 100.00% |
