= Solomon Blatt Sr. =

American politician (1895–1986)

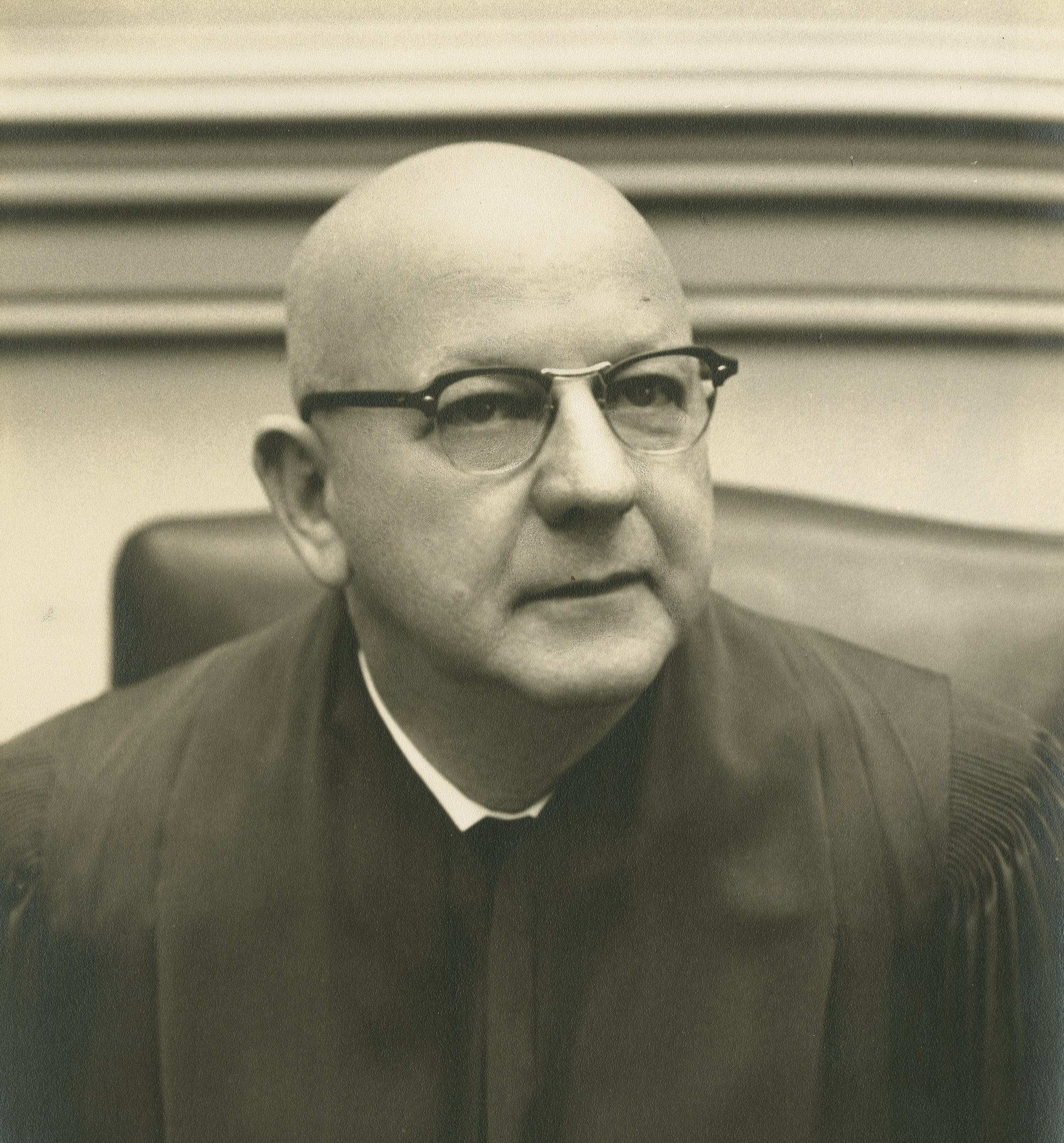

51st and 54th Speaker of the South Carolina House of Representatives
- In office January 9, 1951 – August 1, 1973
- Preceded by: Thomas H. Pope Jr.
- Succeeded by: Rex L. Carter
- In office January 12, 1937 – January 14, 1947
- Preceded by: Claude A. Taylor
- Succeeded by: C. Bruce Littlejohn

Member of the South Carolina House of Representatives
- In office November 14, 1932 – May 14, 1986
- Preceded by: Robert Holman
- Succeeded by: Joseph Wilder
- Constituency: Barnwell County (1932–1974); 91st district (1974–1986)

Personal details
- Born: February 27, 1895 Blackville, South Carolina
- Died: May 14, 1986 (aged 91) Barnwell, South Carolina
- Party: Democratic
- Spouse: Ethel Green
- Education: University of South Carolina, Columbia (BA, LLB)
- Profession: Lawyer and Politician

Military service
- Allegiance: United States
- Branch/service: United States Army
- Years of service: 1917–1918
- Battles/wars: World War I

Solomon Blatt (February 27, 1895 – May 14, 1986) was a long time Democratic legislator of South Carolina from Barnwell County during the middle of the 20th century. He was a principal member of the so-called "Barnwell Ring." His 32-year tenure as Speaker of the South Carolina House of Representatives makes him the second longest-serving leader of any state legislature, surpassed only by Michael Madigan of Illinois. Blatt was an ardent segregationist and spent decades fighting against racial integration. Later in life his views on race relations changed.

== Early life and career ==
Blatt was born in Blackville, South Carolina, to Nathan and Molly Blatt, both Russian Jewish immigrants. Blatt attended the University of South Carolina, where he was a member of the Euphradian Society, and he received his L.LB degree in 1917. The same year he was admitted to the state bar, but his legal career was put on hold while he served as a supply sergeant in France with the 81st Division during World War I. After the war, he resumed the practice of law with future governor Joseph Emile Harley in the firm Harley & Blatt from 1917 to 1934. From 1934 until his death, he was the senior partner of the firm Blatt & Fales.

== Political career ==
In 1932, Blatt was elected to the South Carolina House of Representatives from Barnwell County. Blatt's exceptional political skills were proven by his colleagues unanimously choosing him as the speaker pro tempore of the body in 1935. Two years later in 1937, Blatt ran for the speakership against L. Caston Wannamaker of Chesterfield County. Governor Olin D. Johnston opposed Blatt's bid and actively supported Wannamaker, but Blatt received the backing of the powerful men of the so-called "Barnwell Ring." Blatt won a narrow victory and became speaker after just four years of service.

Strom Thurmond campaigned for governor in 1946 on a platform of reform and against ring rule. All across the state, reform candidates for the legislature challenged the incumbent conservative politicians. Blatt faced a Democratic primary challenge from two Barnwell men and he narrowly eked out a win in the first primary. However, Blatt realized that the political climate had shifted and he announced in August 1946 that he would not seek re-election as speaker of the house. Blatt's fervent support of James F. Byrnes in the 1950 gubernatorial election and his extraordinary political acumen led to his re-election as speaker in 1951. For the next 22 years, Blatt served as speaker and in 1973 the legislature honored him by making him Speaker Emeritus. Blatt was a staunch segregationist, and was one of the primary leaders of South Carolina's efforts against integration. Later in his life and career Blatt’s views on race relations evolved, and upon his retirement he stated that he was proud to live in a state where ‘no longer a man's religious views, political affiliations or the color of his skin can in any way prevent him from walking the road of life to a distance far beyond that which he expected in the years gone by...’ Blatt also voted in March 1974 to designate January 15 as Martin Luther King Jr. Day.

== Personal life ==
Blatt married Ethel Green on March 20, 1920, and they had one son, Solomon Blatt, Jr. Blatt served for 53 consecutive years in the legislature and was honored by the Council of State Governments as the longest serving state legislator in the nation. He died in 1986 from heart and respiratory problems. By the time of his death, he was the longest-serving state legislator in the United States.

== Legacy ==
The University of South Carolina's Blatt Physical Education Center is named for Blatt; in July 2021, the university's Presidential Commission on University History recommended removing his name from the building.
