= Ransome Judson Williams =

American politician (1892–1970)

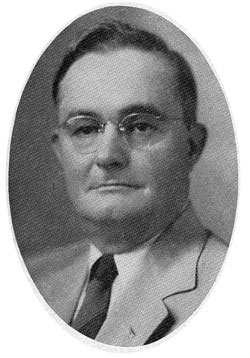

102nd Governor of South Carolina
- In office January 2, 1945 – January 21, 1947
- Lieutenant: Vacant
- Preceded by: Olin D. Johnston
- Succeeded by: Strom Thurmond

75th Lieutenant Governor of South Carolina
- In office January 19, 1943 – January 2, 1945
- Governor: Olin D. Johnston
- Preceded by: Joseph Emile Harley
- Succeeded by: George Bell Timmerman, Jr.

Member of the South Carolina House of Representatives from Marion County
- In office January 13, 1931 – January 10, 1933

Personal details
- Born: Ransome Judson Williams; January 4, 1892 Cope, South Carolina, US
- Died: January 7, 1970 (aged 78)
- Party: Democratic
- Spouse: Virginia Allen
- Children: 2
- Education: Medical University of South Carolina
- Profession: Pharmacist, politician

Ransome Judson Williams (January 4, 1892 – January 7, 1970) was the 102nd governor of South Carolina from 1945 to 1947.

== Biography ==
Born in Cope, South Carolina, he graduated from the Medical University of South Carolina in Charleston and became employed as a pharmacist. He married Virginia Faith Allen, daughter of Mr. and Mrs. Joel Isham Allen, on October 11, 1916. His political career began when he was first elected to the South Carolina House of Representatives and served from 1931 to 1932. In 1943, he was elected the 75th lieutenant governor of South Carolina and when Governor Olin Johnston resigned in 1945, Williams became governor.

Williams sought re-election in 1946, but never had much popular support and finished a distant third to the eventual winner, Strom Thurmond. After the end of his term in 1947, he served as a trustee for numerous state colleges and died on January 7, 1970.

A supporter of labor rights, during his time as governor Williams obtained legislation providing for the extension of retirement privileges to all city, county and state employees, and presided over various reforms in other areas such as health and welfare.

Political offices
Preceded by Joseph Emile Harley	Lieutenant Governor of South Carolina; 1943–1945	Succeeded by George Bell Timmerman, Jr.
Preceded by Olin D. Johnston	Governor of South Carolina; 1945–1947	Succeeded by Strom Thurmond
