= George Bell Timmerman Jr. =

American politician (1912–1994)

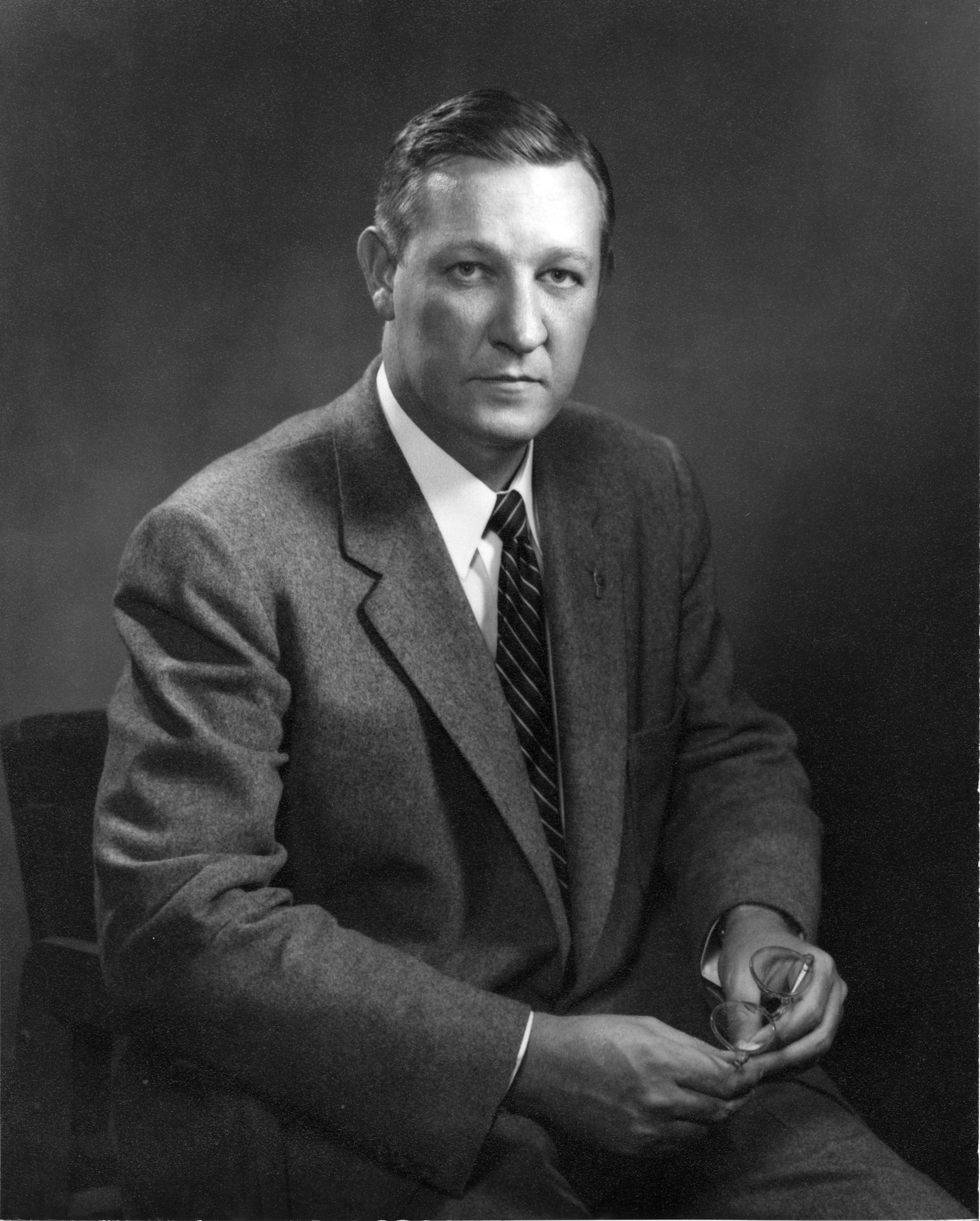
- Portrait, 1950s

105th Governor of South Carolina
- In office January 18, 1955 – January 20, 1959
- Lieutenant: Fritz Hollings
- Preceded by: James F. Byrnes
- Succeeded by: Fritz Hollings

76th Lieutenant Governor of South Carolina
- In office January 21, 1947 – January 18, 1955
- Governor: Strom Thurmond; James F. Byrnes
- Preceded by: Ransome Judson Williams
- Succeeded by: Fritz Hollings

Personal details
- Born: George Bell Timmerman Jr. August 11, 1912 Anderson County, South Carolina, U.S.
- Died: November 29, 1994 (aged 82) Batesburg-Leesville, South Carolina, U.S.
- Resting place: Batesburg Cemetery, Batesburg, South Carolina
- Party: Democratic
- Spouse(s): Helen Dupre (m. 1935 until her death in 1980); Ingrid Zimmer (m. 1992 until his death)
- Education: The Citadel; University of South Carolina, Columbia (LLB)

Military service
- Allegiance: United States
- Branch/service: United States Navy
- Years of service: 1942–1945
- Battles/wars: World War II

George Bell Timmerman Jr. (August 11, 1912 – November 29, 1994) was an American politician and World War II veteran who served as the 105th governor of South Carolina from 1955 to 1959. A member of the Democratic Party, he previously served as the state's 76th lieutenant governor from 1947 to 1955.

== Life and career ==
Timmerman was born in Anderson County, the son of Mary Vandiver (Sullivan) and George Bell Timmerman Sr., a U.S. federal judge. He was raised in Charleston and graduated from The Citadel. After receiving a law degree from the University of South Carolina, he practiced law with his father in Batesburg. Timmerman enlisted in the U.S. Navy as an officer with the entry of the United States in World War II after the attack on Pearl Harbor.

=== Lieutenant Governor of South Carolina ===
Returning to South Carolina after the war, Timmerman ran as a Democrat for Lieutenant Governor in 1946 on the same ticket as fellow veteran Strom Thurmond. He was elected for a term beginning in 1947 and reelected in 1950 for another four-year term.

=== Gubernatorial tenure ===
While Governor he opposed the Supreme Court's ruling in 1954, which declared segregated public schools unconstitutional. Timmerman fought the changes brought by the decision, in an attempt to defend "the integrity of the races" and "our customs and institutions." He urged Congress to limit the authority of the United States Supreme Court. He regarded the insistence of the Northern United States on racial integration as hypocritical.

Presiding over Henry v. Greenville Municiple Airport, Richard Henry initially lost his suit against the Greenville airport. Judge George Timmerman, a former South Carolina governor that opposed Brown v. Board of Education (1954) and federally-mandated segregation, ruled in favor of the airport. Timmerman, citing Plessy v. Ferguson (1896), which had already been overturned by Brown v. Board (1954), wrote that no law or constitutional principle "requires others to accept [Henry] as a companion or social equal."[1][2] Timmerman further declared that Henry had no intention of waiting in the white room, but was instead attempting to "instigating litigation."[2] Furthermore, the court argued that Henry did not receive irreparable injury by being prohibited from the whites-only waiting room.[17] Henry, however, won the case on appeal, and the airport desegregated under a mandatory court order in February 1961.[1] The ruling prohibited the airport "from making any distinction based upon color in regard to services at the Greenville Municipal Airport."

In the gubernatorial election of 1954, he faced nominal opposition in the Democratic primary and ran unopposed in the general election. He became the 105th Governor of South Carolina in 1955. He sought to thwart an order by the Interstate Commerce Commission for desegregation of long-distance travel in 1955, especially because it affected public waiting rooms. At the same time, Timmerman opposed federal court orders aimed at integrating public parks, bathing beaches and golf courses. For the desegregation of public schools, he vowed with other governors of the Southern United States to thwart it with congressional or state legislation.

He was the favorite presidential candidate of the South Carolina delegation at the 1956 Democratic National Convention. During the convention, Timmerman was a leader of Southern opposition to what he called "radical civil rights legislation and radical planks in the platform." He signed a law in 1956 to bar members of the National Association for the Advancement of Colored People from public employment in South Carolina. He opposed civil rights laws enacted by the administration of Dwight D. Eisenhower.

=== Judicial appointment and retirement ===
After leaving the governorship in 1959, Timmerman was appointed as a judge to the state's Eleventh Judicial Circuit in 1967 and served until 1984. While a judge, Timmerman declared the 1974 South Carolina law on capital punishment to be unconstitutional. This ruling was affirmed in the 1976 U.S. Supreme Court decision Gregg v. Georgia.

He died on November 29, 1994, in Batesburg-Leesville, South Carolina.

Party political offices
Preceded by James F. Byrnes	Democratic nominee for Governor of South Carolina; 1954	Succeeded by Fritz Hollings
Political offices
Preceded by Ransome Judson Williams	Lieutenant Governor of South Carolina; January 21, 1947–January 18, 1955	Succeeded by Ernest Hollings
Preceded by James F. Byrnes	Governor of South Carolina; January 18, 1955–January 20, 1959	Succeeded by Ernest Hollings
