= James Strom Thurmond Jr. =

American politician (born 1972)

Strom Thurmond Jr.
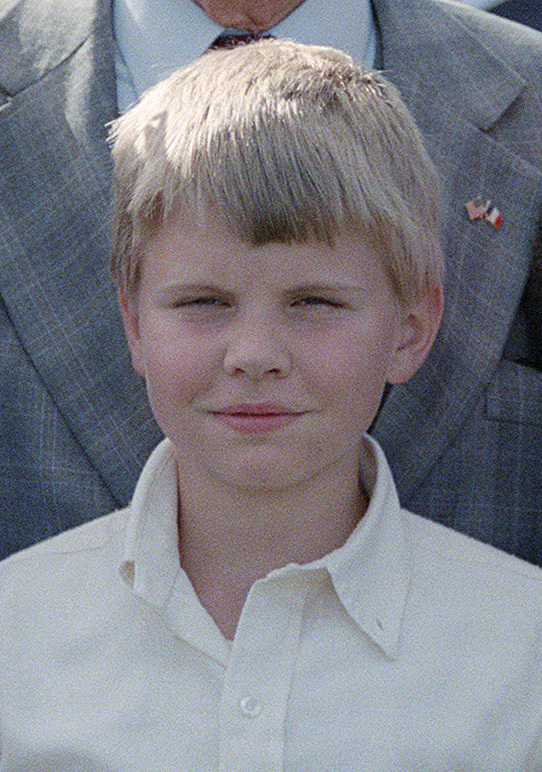
- Thurmond in 1984

Solicitor for the Second Judicial Circuit of South Carolina
- In office January 3, 2009 – November 9, 2020
- Preceded by: Barbara R. Morgan
- Succeeded by: Bill Weeks

United States Attorney for the District of South Carolina
- In office November 2001 – January 20, 2005
- President: George W. Bush
- Preceded by: J. René Josey
- Succeeded by: Reginald I. Lloyd

Personal details
- Born: James Strom Thurmond Jr. October 18, 1972 (age 53)
- Party: Republican
- Spouse: Heather Thurmond
- Children: 2
- Parent(s): Strom Thurmond; Nancy Moore Thurmond
- Relatives: Paul Thurmond (brother); Essie Mae Washington-Williams (half-sister)
- Education: University of South Carolina, Columbia (BA, JD)

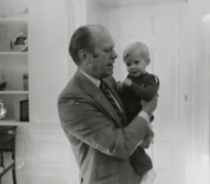
Thurmond and Gerald Ford in 1974

James Strom Thurmond Jr. (born October 18, 1972) is a former United States Attorney for the District of South Carolina and 2nd Circuit Solicitor. He is one of four children born to United States Senator Strom Thurmond and Nancy (Moore) Thurmond. His younger brother, Paul, is a former member of the South Carolina Senate. Thurmond graduated from the University of South Carolina in 1995 and University of South Carolina School of Law in 1998. He has been Strom Thurmond's oldest living child since the deaths of his sister Nancy in 1993 and his half-sister Essie in 2013.

== Career ==
Thurmond was recommended for the position of United States attorney in South Carolina by his father, who was the chair of the Senate Judiciary Committee, the panel that reviewed such appointments. Senator Thurmond claimed his son was "uniquely qualified". At the time, Thurmond Jr. was 28 years old and had been a practicing lawyer for fewer than three years, whereas the average age of the 93 U.S. attorneys was 50, and their average legal experience 22 years. But the nomination was not contentious, as it was also backed by South Carolina Democrats, including the then-junior U.S. senator, Fritz Hollings. Thurmond served as assistant solicitor for the solicitor's office of the Second Judicial Circuit of South Carolina (1999–2001), as U.S. attorney (2001–2005), and solicitor for the Second Judicial Circuit of South Carolina (2009–2020).

In January 2021, he began private law practice.
