= Essie Mae Washington-Williams =

American school teacher and writer (1925–2013)

- Washington-Williams in 2003
- Born: Essie Mae Butler; October 12, 1925; Edgefield, South Carolina, U.S.
- Died: February 4, 2013 (aged 87); Columbia, South Carolina, U.S.
- Other name: Essie Mae Washington
- Education: South Carolina State College; California State University, Los Angeles (BA); University of Southern California (MEd)
- Occupation: Teacher
- Spouse: Julius T. Williams (m. 1948; died 1964)
- Children: 4
- Parent(s): Strom Thurmond; Carrie Butler
- Relatives: James Strom Thurmond Jr. (half-brother); Paul Thurmond (half-brother)

Essie Mae Washington-Williams (née Butler; October 12, 1925 – February 4, 2013) was an American teacher and author. She was the eldest child of Strom Thurmond, governor of and United States senator from South Carolina. Of mixed race, she was born to Carrie Butler, a 16-year-old African-American girl who worked as a domestic servant for Thurmond's parents, and Thurmond, then 22 and unmarried. Essie Mae grew up in the family of one of her mother's sisters, not learning of her biological parents until 1938 when her mother came for a visit and informed Essie Mae she was her mother. She graduated from college, earned a master's degree, married, raised a family, and had a 30-year professional career in education.

Washington-Williams did not reveal her father's identity until she was almost 78 years old, after Thurmond's death at the age of 100 in 2003. Though he had little to do with her upbringing, he had paid for her college education and took an interest in her and her family all his life. In 2005, she published her autobiography, Dear Senator: A Memoir by the Daughter of Strom Thurmond, which was nominated for the National Book Award and a Pulitzer Prize.

== Early life ==
Essie Mae was the daughter of Carrie Butler, who was 15 or 16 when her daughter was born, and Strom Thurmond, then 22. Carrie Butler worked as a domestic servant for Thurmond's parents. Butler sent her daughter from South Carolina to her older sister Mary and her husband John Henry Washington to be raised in Coatesville, Pennsylvania. The girl was named Essie after another of Carrie's sisters, who fostered her briefly as an infant. Essie Mae grew up with her cousin, who was seven years older and whom she believed to be her half-brother. She was unaware of the identity of her biological parents until 1938, when she was 13 and her mother told her the full story. In 1941, her mother took her to meet Thurmond in person.

Essie Mae and her mother met infrequently with Thurmond after that, although they had some contact for years. After high school, she worked as a nurse at Harlem Hospital in New York City, and took a course in business education at New York University.

She did not visit the segregated South until 1942, when she met relatives in Edgefield. After having grown up in Pennsylvania, she was shocked by the racial restrictions of the South. She returned to the North to live with relatives during the war years. After Thurmond returned from World War II, she started college at the all-black South Carolina State College (SCSC) in the fall of 1947. Thurmond quietly paid for her college education. She met and married future lawyer Julius Williams at SCSC in 1948. Her first child, Julius Williams Jr., was born in 1949. As a result, Essie Mae left college in the summer of 1949 to begin raising the first of her four children.

== Career ==
During the late 1950s and 1960s, the years of national activism in the civil rights movement, Washington occasionally tried to discuss racism with Thurmond, who was known for his long-time political support for segregation, but he brushed off her complaints about segregated facilities. Nevertheless, Washington felt that she made a significant impact on Thurmond during their private conversations on race and race relations and that Thurmond's policies towards African Americans were affected as a result. In 1976, for example, Thurmond supported the nomination of Matthew J. Perry, whom Essie Mae dated in 1947 shortly before she met her husband, to the U.S. Court of Military Appeals. Thurmond became the first Southern senator to support an African American for a federal judgeship.

Following the death of her husband in 1964, Washington moved again, to Los Angeles, California, where she completed her undergraduate studies to receive a bachelor's degree from California State University, Los Angeles in 1969 and earned a master's degree in education at the University of Southern California. She had a 30-year career as a teacher in the Los Angeles Unified School District from 1967 through 1997. Washington was a longtime member of Delta Sigma Theta sorority, which she joined while at South Carolina State.

== Personal life ==
In 1949, Washington left college before her junior year after marrying Julius T. Williams, a law student at SCSC, the previous year. After his graduation from law school, they moved to his home town, Savannah, Georgia, where he established a law practice and was active in the NAACP. They had two sons and two daughters together. He died in 1964. At the time of her death, Washington-Williams had 14 grandchildren and 15 great-grandchildren.

Following Thurmond's death in 2003, Washington-Williams applied for membership in the United Daughters of the Confederacy based on her heritage through Thurmond to ancestors who fought as Confederate soldiers. She was rejected, as Thurmond's name was not on her birth certificate. She also intended to join the Daughters of the American Revolution.

In 2004, Washington-Williams said that she intended to be active on behalf of the Black Patriots Foundation, which was raising funds to build a monument on the National Mall in Washington, D.C., to honor black Americans who served in the Revolutionary War. This organization became defunct the following year, and was replaced by the National Mall Liberty Fund.

Washington-Williams was a Congregationalist.

== Death ==
Washington-Williams died February 4, 2013, in Columbia, South Carolina, at age 87.

== Legacy and honors ==
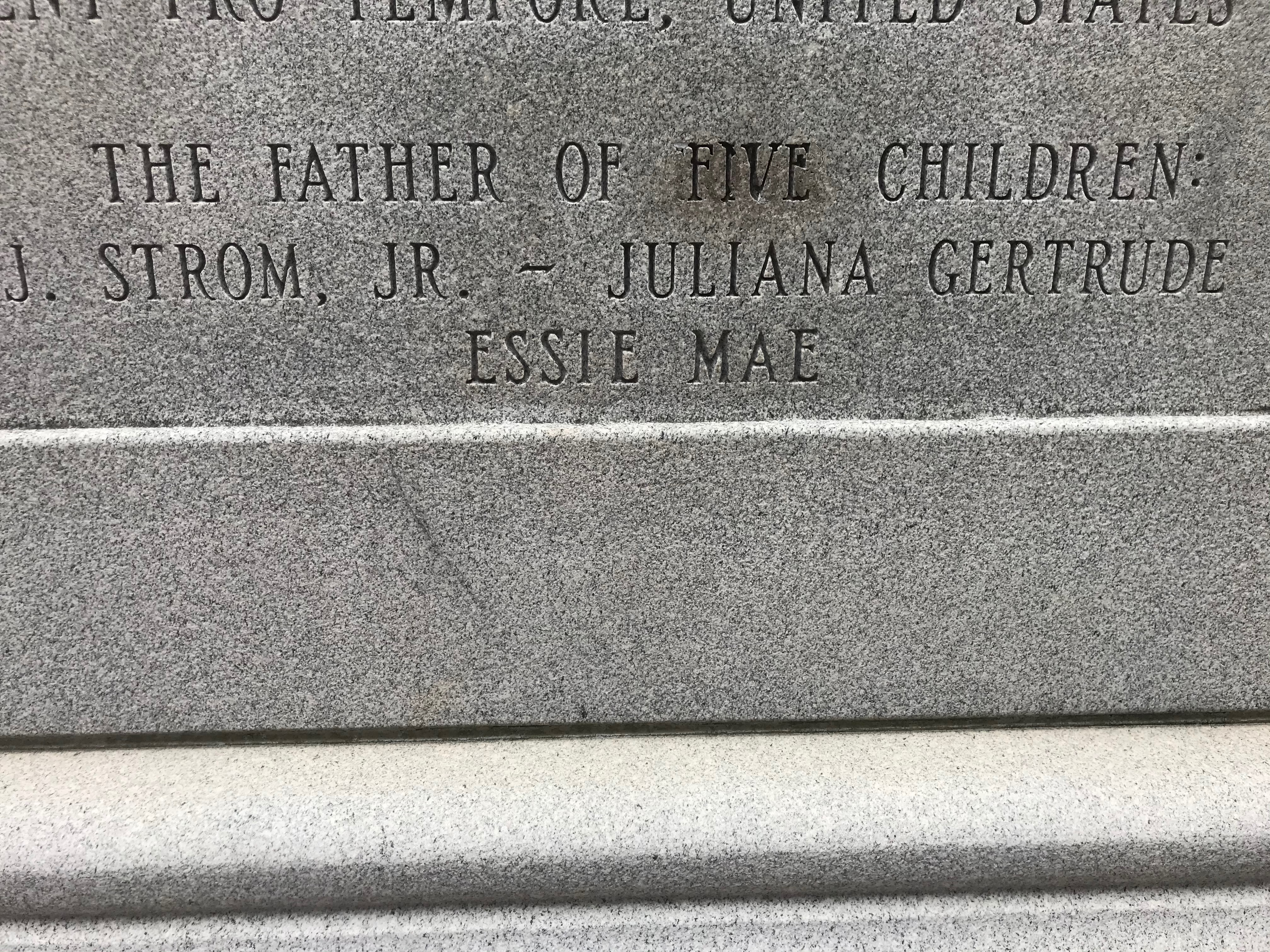
Strom Thurmond's statue with Essie Mae added. In the phrase "The father of four children", the "four" was replaced with "five".

When Washington-Williams announced her family connection, it was acknowledged by the Thurmond family. In 2004, the state legislature approved the addition of her name to the list of Thurmond children on a monument for Senator Thurmond on the South Carolina Statehouse grounds.

In 2005, Washington-Williams was awarded an honorary Doctorate in education from South Carolina State University at Orangeburg when she was invited to speak at their commencement ceremony.

She published a memoir, Dear Senator: A Memoir by the Daughter of Strom Thurmond (2005), written with William Stadiem. It explored her sense of dislocation based on her mixed heritage, as well as going to college in the segregated South after having grown up in Pennsylvania. It was nominated for both a National Book Award and a Pulitzer Prize.
