= Barnwell Ring =

Political grouping

The so-called "Barnwell Ring" was a grouping of influential Democratic South Carolina political leaders from Barnwell County. The group included state Senator Edgar A. Brown, state Representative Solomon Blatt, Sr., Governor Joseph Emile Harley, and state Representative Winchester Smith, Jr. Together, the four occupied the most powerful positions of South Carolina government in 1941.

== Origins ==
Strom Thurmond coined the term "Barnwell Ring" during his bid for governor in 1946. He campaigned on a progressive platform, which put him squarely at odds with the conservative legislators of the Barnwell Ring. They threw their support to James C. McLeod of Florence and they used every device at their disposal to prevent a victory by Thurmond in the Democratic primary election. For instance, when the gubernatorial candidates stumped at Barnwell, Winchester Smith paid candidate Roger Scott $50 to raise Cain about the "Barnwell Ring" in order to lessen the impact of Thurmond's speech against the ring.

The ring arose in the late 1930s and lasted into the 1970s. State Senator Edgar A. Brown and state Representative Solomon Blatt were the chief principals of the ring. Brown was the president pro tempore and chairman of the Senate Finance Committee from 1942 to 1972. Blatt was the speaker of the house from 1937 to 1946 and 1951 to 1973. Both men denied the existence of the ring until 1963 when Brown exclaimed "Long live the Barnwell Ring" at a dinner to honor Blatt.
