= 1946 South Carolina gubernatorial election =

1946 South Carolina Democratic gubernatorial primary runoff
- September 3, 1946
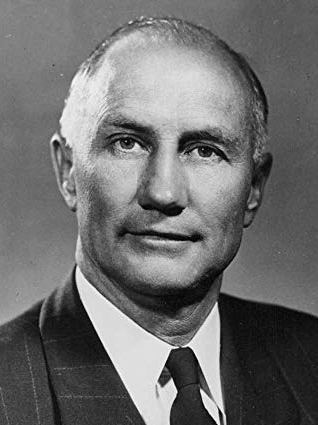

Nominee	Strom Thurmond	James C. McLeod
Party	Democratic	Democratic
Popular vote	144,420	109,169
Percentage	56.95%	43.05%
- County results Thurmond: 50–60% 60–70% 70–80% 80–90% McLeod: 50–60% 60–70% 70–80%
Governor before election
Ransome Williams
Democratic
Elected Governor
Strom Thurmond
Democratic

The 1946 South Carolina gubernatorial election was held on November 5, 1946, to select the governor of the state of South Carolina. Strom Thurmond won the contested Democratic primary and ran unopposed in the general election becoming the 103rd governor of South Carolina.

== Democratic primary ==
=== Candidates ===
- Archie J. Beattie
- Carl B. Epps
- John D. Long
- James C. McLeod, Florence County physician
- Dell O'Neal
- Roger W. Scott
- Marcus A. Stone
- John C. Taylor, former U.S. Representative from Anderson
- Strom Thurmond, World War II veteran and former State Senator from Edgefield
- Ransome Judson Williams, incumbent Governor
- A.L. Wood

The South Carolina Democratic Party held their primary for governor in the summer of 1946 and ten candidates entered the contest. The race featured Governor Ransome Judson Williams, who became governor in 1945 upon the resignation of Olin D. Johnston, but it mainly became a contest between Strom Thurmond and James McLeod. Strom Thurmond was a World War II veteran and advocated a progressive platform whereas, James McLeod, a physician from Florence County, had the support of the "Barnwell Ring" and sought to maintain the status quo. Race was not an issue in the campaign and Strom Thurmond emerged victorious with the support of the returning veterans of World War II who wanted to reform South Carolina.

Democratic Primary
Candidate	Votes	%
Strom Thurmond	96,691	33.4
James C. McLeod	83,464	28.9
Ransome Judson Williams	35,813	12.4
John C. Taylor	22,447	7.8
Dell O'Neal	16,574	5.7
John D. Long	16,503	5.7
Carl B. Epps	5,189	1.8
Marcus A. Stone	4,353	1.5
A.L. Wood	3,040	1.0
Archie J. Beattie	2,889	1.0
Roger W. Scott	2,251	0.8

Democratic Primary Runoff
Candidate	Votes	%	±%
Strom Thurmond	144,420	57.0	+23.6
James C. McLeod	109,169	43.0	+14.1

== General election ==
The general election was held on November 5, 1946, and Strom Thurmond was elected the next governor of South Carolina without opposition on account of South Carolina's effective status as a one-party state. Being a non-presidential election and with few contested races, turnout was much lower than in the Democratic primary election.

South Carolina Gubernatorial Election, 1946
Party	Candidate	Votes	%	±%
Democratic	Strom Thurmond	26,520	100.00	0.0
Majority		26,520	100.00	0.0
Turnout		26,520		
Democratic hold				

65+% won by Thurmond

== See also ==
- Governor of South Carolina
- List of governors of South Carolina
- South Carolina gubernatorial elections

Preceded by 1942	South Carolina gubernatorial elections	Succeeded by 1950
