= Walter Hundley =

American politician

Member of the South Carolina Senate from the 41st District
- In office July 2012 – January 2013
- Preceded by: Glenn F. McConnell
- Succeeded by: Paul R. Thurmond

Personal details
- Born: January 12, 1953 (age 73) Charleston, South Carolina, U.S.
- Party: Republican
- Spouse: Cindi
- Education: Clemson University (B.A.); University of South Carolina (J.D.)
- Profession: Attorney
- Website: walterhundley.com

R. Walter Hundley (born January 12, 1953) served as a Republican member of the South Carolina Senate, representing the people of the 41st District. Hundley was elected in a special general election on July 17, 2012, to fulfill the remainder of Glenn F. McConnell's term following the latter's resignation to become Lieutenant Governor of South Carolina.

== Early political career ==
Hundley was appointed by Governor Carroll Campbell as a commissioner to the South Carolina Worker's Compensation Committee.

== Business career ==
Hundley is a workers compensation attorney in Charleston, South Carolina. He worked with an insurance defense firm for five years, but has practiced exclusively as a Plaintiff's attorney for the past twenty-five years. Prior to opening his own firm, Walter served as a South Carolina Workers’ Compensation Commissioner and Chairman. Hundley is a third generation lawyer.

== Personal life ==
Hundley is married and has and three children on the Island.

=== Education ===
Hundley graduated Porter-Gaud School in 1971. He is a Clemson University class of 1971 alumnus with a Bachelor of Arts in English. He earned his Juris Doctorite from the University of South Carolina School of Law.

== Awards ==
The Order of the Palmetto was awarded to Hundley on January 10, 1995, by Former Governor Carroll Campbell.

Political offices
Preceded by Glenn F. McConnell	South Carolina Senate, District 41; July 2012-January 2013	Succeeded by Paul Thurmond
