= 1930 South Carolina gubernatorial election =

1930 South Carolina Democratic gubernatorial primary runoff
- September 8, 1930
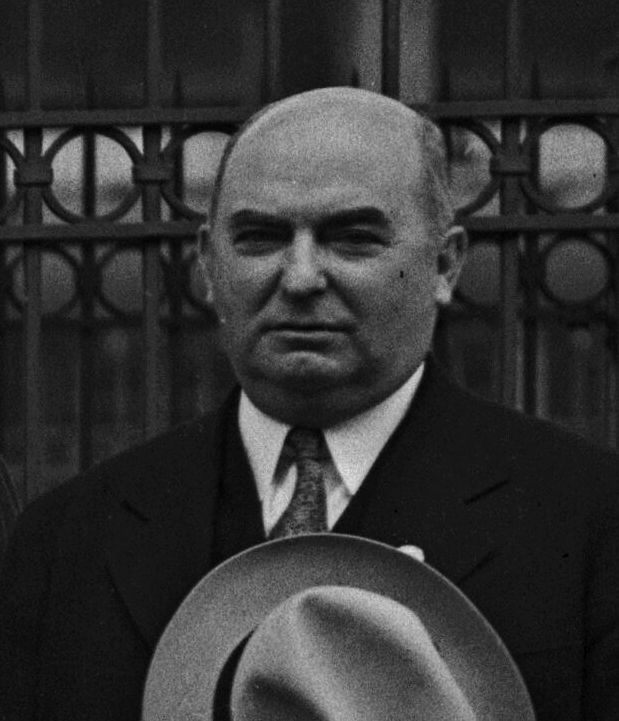

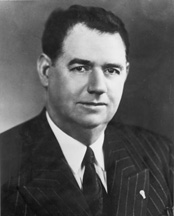
Candidate	Ibra Blackwood	Olin Johnston
Party	Democratic	Democratic
Popular vote	118,721	117,752
Percentage	50.20%	49.80%
- County results Blackwood: 50–60% 60–70% 70–80% 80–90% >90% Johnston: 50–60% 60–70% 70–80%
Governor of South Carolina before election
John Gardiner Richards Jr.
Democratic
Elected Governor of South Carolina
Ibra Blackwood
Democratic

The 1930 South Carolina gubernatorial election was held on November 4, 1930, to select the governor of the state of South Carolina. Ibra Charles Blackwood won the contested Democratic primary and ran unopposed in the general election becoming the 97th governor of South Carolina.

== Democratic primary ==
=== Candidates ===
- Ibra Charles Blackwood, attorney, former State Representative from Spartanburg and candidate for Governor in 1926
- R. Beverly Herbert
- Olin D. Johnston, State Representative from Spartanburg
- William H. Keith
- A. Frank Lever, former U.S. Representative from Lexington
- John J. McMahan
- W.W. Smoak
- Ashton H. Williams

The South Carolina Democratic Party held their primary for governor in the summer of 1930 and it attracted many politicians because of the change in 1926 to the South Carolina constitution providing for a four-year term. Blackwood emerged victorious from the closely contested runoff against Olin D. Johnston and effectively became the next governor of South Carolina because there was no opposition in the general election.

Democratic Primary
Candidate	Votes	%
Olin D. Johnston	58,653	24.9
Ibra Charles Blackwood	43,859	18.6
Asbury Francis Lever	39,477	16.7
Ashton H. Williams	36,488	15.5
William H. Keith	28,780	12.2
R. Beverly Herbert	17,102	7.3
W.W. Smoak	10,193	4.3
John J. McMahan	1,113	0.5

Democratic Primary Runoff
Candidate	Votes	%	±%
Ibra Charles Blackwood	118,721	50.2	+31.6
Olin D. Johnston	117,752	49.8	+24.9

== General election ==
The general election was held on November 4, 1930, and Ibra Charles Blackwood was elected the next governor of South Carolina without opposition on account of South Carolina's effective status as a one-party state. Being a non-presidential election and few contested races, turnout was the second lowest ever for a gubernatorial election in South Carolina.

South Carolina Gubernatorial Election, 1930
Party	Candidate	Votes	%	±%
Democratic	Ibra Charles Blackwood	17,790	100.00	0.0
Majority		17,790	100.00	0.0
Turnout		17,790		
Democratic hold				

65+% won by Blackwood

== See also ==
- Governor of South Carolina
- List of governors of South Carolina
- South Carolina gubernatorial elections

Preceded by 1926	South Carolina gubernatorial elections	Succeeded by 1934
