= James B. Gaston =

American politician (1893–1958)

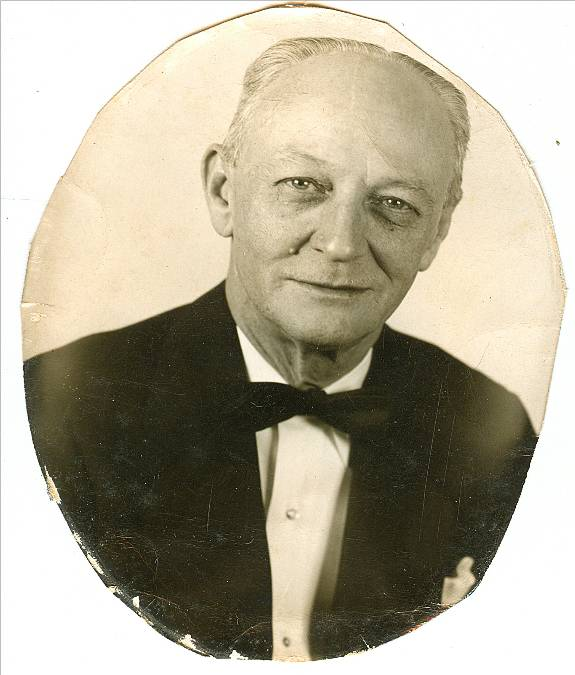

Personal details
- Born: October 25, 1893 Gainesville, Georgia, U.S.
- Died: June 29, 1958 (aged 64) Wilson, North Carolina, U.S.
- Party: Republican
- Spouse: Elizabeth Sligh Greneker (m. 1923)
- Children: 1
- Education: University of Georgia

James Bostwick Gaston (October 25, 1893 – June 29, 1958) was an American businessman and politician from South Carolina. He was a president of the Greenville Spinners, and was known for being a Republican in South Carolina during the period of the Solid South.

== Early life ==
Gaston was born on October 25, 1893, in Gainesville, Georgia. He attended college at the University of Georgia, where he played baseball. He moved to Greenville, South Carolina, in 1942 and became manager of the Greenville Spinners.

== Political career ==
Gaston ran for office as a Republican in 1944 for the U.S. Senate, losing to Olin B. Johnston. He served as Greenville County Republican chairman. He would unsuccessfully run for the House in 1948, losing to Joseph R. Bryson.

== Personal life ==
He married his wife, Elizabeth Sligh Greneker, on December 24, 1923. He died on June 19, 1958, in Wilson, North Carolina, aged 64.

== Electoral history ==
South Carolina U.S. Senate Election, 1944
Party	Candidate	Votes	%	±%
Democratic	Olin D. Johnston	94,556	92.94%	−5.95%
Republican	James B. Gaston	3,807	3.74%	+2.63%
Progressive Democratic	Osceola E. McKaine	3,214	3.16%	N/A
Republican (Tolbert)	B.L. Hendrix	141	0.14%	N/A
No party	Write-Ins	18	0.02%	N/A
Majority		90,749	89.20%	−8.58%
Turnout		101,736		
Democratic hold				

Year	Republican	Votes	%	Democratic	Votes	%
1948	James B. Gaston	894	5.1%	√ Joseph R. Bryson	20,439	94.9%
