= Dixiecrat =

1948 U.S. segregationist political party

States' Rights Democratic Party
- Leader: Strom Thurmond
- Founded: July 17, 1948; 78 years ago
- Dissolved: November 1948; 78 years ago
- Split from: Democratic Party
- Merged into: Democratic Party; Republican Party
- Ideology: White supremacy; Segregationism; States' rights; Conservatism (US); Social conservatism; Ultraconservatism
- Political position: Far-right
- Colors: Red, white, blue (official); Blue (de facto)

Party flag (de facto)

The States' Rights Democratic Party, also colloquially referred to as the Dixiecrat Party, was a short-lived segregationist, states' rights, and Southern Democratic political party in the United States, active primarily in the South.

After President Harry S. Truman, the leader of the Democratic Party, ordered integration of the military in 1948 and other actions to address civil rights of African Americans, including the first presidential proposal for comprehensive civil and voting rights, many Southern white politicians who objected to this course organized themselves as a breakaway faction. They wished to protect the ability of states to decide on racial segregation. Its members were referred to as "Dixiecrats", a portmanteau of "Dixie", referring to the Southern United States, and "Democrat".

In the 1930s, a political realignment occurred largely due to the New Deal policies of President Franklin D. Roosevelt. While many Democrats in the South supported substantive economic intervention, civil rights for African Americans were not specifically incorporated within the New Deal agenda, due in part to Southern control over many key positions of power within the U.S. Congress. Supporters assumed control of the state Democratic parties in part or in full in several Southern states. They opposed racial integration and wanted to retain Jim Crow laws and other aspects of de jure and de facto racial discrimination. On non-racial issues, they held heterogeneous beliefs. Despite the Dixiecrats' success in several states, Truman was narrowly re-elected. After the 1948 election, its leaders generally returned to the Democratic Party, at least for a time, although the Dixiecrats weakened Democratic identity among white Southerners. The Dixiecrats' standard bearer, Senator Strom Thurmond of South Carolina, eventually switched to the Republican Party in 1964, in opposition to national civil rights legislation.

== Background (1865–1948) ==
The states in dark red compose the Deep South today. Adjoining areas of East Texas, West Tennessee, and North Florida are also considered part of this subregion. Historically, each of these states were in the Confederate States of America.

Since the beginning of Reconstruction, Southern white voters supported the Democratic Party by overwhelming margins in both local and national elections (the few exceptions include minor pockets of Republican electoral strength in Appalachia, East Tennessee in particular, Gillespie and Kendall Counties of central Texas), forming what was known as the "Solid South". Even during the last years of Reconstruction, Democrats used paramilitary insurgents and other activists to disrupt and intimidate Republican freedman voters, including fraud at the polls and attacks on their leaders. The electoral violence culminated in the Democrats regaining control of the state legislatures and passing new constitutions and laws from 1890 to 1908 to disenfranchise most blacks and many poor whites. They also imposed Jim Crow, a combination of legal and informal segregation acts that made blacks second-class citizens, confirming their lack of political power through most of the southern United States. The social and economic systems of the Solid South were based on this structure, although the white Democrats retained all the congressional seats apportioned for the total population of their states. Three-time Democratic Party presidential candidate William Jennings Bryan opposed a highly controversial resolution at the 1924 Democratic National Convention condemning the Ku Klux Klan, expecting the organization would soon fold. Bryan disliked the Klan but never publicly attacked it.

In the 1930s, a political realignment occurred largely due to the New Deal policies of President Franklin D. Roosevelt. While many Democrats in the South had shifted toward favoring economic intervention, civil rights for African Americans was not specifically incorporated within the New Deal agenda, due in part to Southern control over many key positions of power within the U.S. Congress. Nonetheless, civil rights gained an outspoken champion in First Lady Eleanor Roosevelt, and supportive approaches from the administration's "Black Cabinet".

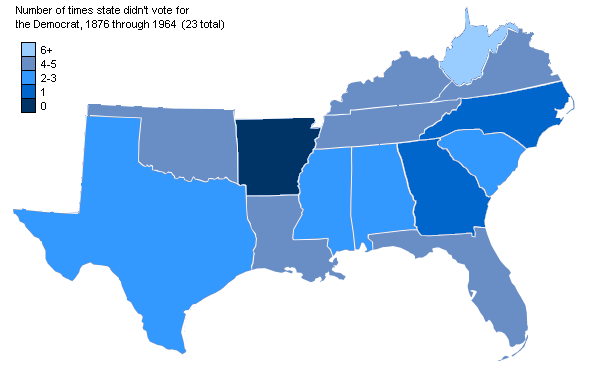
"Solid South": Arkansas voted Democratic in all 23 presidential elections from 1876 through 1964; other states were not quite as solid but generally supported Democrats for president.

With the entry of the United States into the Second World War, Jim Crow was indirectly challenged. More than one and a half million black Americans served in the U.S. military during World War II, where they received equal pay while serving within segregated units. (While equally entitled to receive veterans' benefits after the war, the vast majority of African American veterans were prevented from accessing most benefits due in part to Southern success in Congress to have benefits administered by the states instead of the federal government.) Tens of thousands of black civilians at home were recruited in the labor-starved war industries across many urban centers in the country, mainly due to the promotion of Executive Order 8802, which required defense industries not to discriminate based on ethnicity or race.

Members of the Republican Party (which nominated Governor of New York Thomas E. Dewey in 1944 and 1948), along with many Democrats from the northern and western states, supported civil rights legislation that the Deep South Democrats in Congress almost unanimously opposed. Southern Democratic ideology on non-racial issues was heterogeneous. Some such as Fielding L. Wright supported the tenets of the New Deal, others such as Harry F. Byrd joined the conservative coalition. The Dixiecrats' presidential candidate, Strom Thurmond, became a Republican in 1964, as the Republican standard bearer opposed civil rights laws. The Dixiecrats represented the weakening of the "Solid South". (This referred to the Southern Democratic Party's control of presidential elections in the South and most seats in Congress, partly through decades of disfranchisement of blacks entrenched by Southern state legislatures between 1890 and 1908.) The Republicans of the lily-white movement in the South also turned against blacks. Blacks had formerly been aligned with the Republican Party before being excluded from politics in the region, but during the Great Migration African Americans had found the Democratic Party in the North, West and the national Democratic party more suited to their interests.

== 1948 presidential election ==
Thurmond's ballot access in the 1948 U.S. presidential election

After Roosevelt died, the new president Harry S. Truman established a highly visible President's Committee on Civil Rights and issued Executive Order 9981 to end discrimination in the military in 1948. A group of Southern governors, including Strom Thurmond of South Carolina and Fielding L. Wright of Mississippi, met to consider the place of Southerners within the Democratic Party. After a tense meeting with Democratic National Committee (DNC) chairman and Truman confidant J. Howard McGrath, the Southern governors agreed to convene their own convention in Birmingham, Alabama, if Truman and civil rights supporters emerged victorious at the 1948 Democratic National Convention. In July, the convention nominated Truman to run for a full term and adopted a plank proposed by Northern liberals led by Hubert Humphrey calling for civil rights; 35 Southern delegates walked out. The move was on to remove Truman's name from the ballot in the southern United States. This political maneuvering required the organization of a new and distinct political party, which the Southern defectors from the Democratic Party chose to brand as the States' Rights Democratic Party.

Just days after the 1948 Democratic National Convention, the States' Rights Democrats held their own convention at Municipal Auditorium in Birmingham, on July 17. While several leaders from the Deep South such as Strom Thurmond and James Eastland attended, most major Southern Democrats did not attend the conference. Among those absent were Georgia senator Richard Russell Jr., who had finished with the second-most delegates in the Democratic presidential ballot.

1948 electoral votes by state. The Dixiecrats carried Louisiana, Mississippi, Alabama, and South Carolina, and received one additional electoral vote in Tennessee (colored in orange). States in blue voted for Democrats Harry S. Truman and Alben W. Barkley; those in red voted for Republicans Thomas E. Dewey and Earl Warren.

Prior to their own States' Rights Democratic Party convention, it was not clear whether the Dixiecrats would seek to field their own candidate or simply try to prevent Southern electors from voting for Truman. Many in the press predicted that if the Dixiecrats did nominate a ticket, Arkansas Governor Benjamin Travis Laney would be the presidential nominee, and South Carolina Governor Strom Thurmond or Mississippi Governor Fielding L. Wright the vice presidential nominee. Laney traveled to Birmingham during the convention, but he ultimately decided that he did not want to join a third party and remained in his hotel during the convention. Thurmond himself had doubts about a third-party bid, but party organizers convinced him to accept the party's nomination, with Fielding Wright as his running mate. Wright's supporters had hoped that Wright would lead the ticket, but Wright deferred to Thurmond, who had greater national stature. The selection of Thurmond received fairly positive reviews from the national press, as Thurmond had pursued relatively moderate policies on civil rights and did not employ the fiery rhetoric used by other segregationist leaders.

The States' Rights Democrats did not formally declare themselves as being a new third party, but rather said that they were only "recommending" that state Democratic Parties vote for the Thurmond–Wright ticket. The goal of the party was to win the 127 electoral votes of the Solid South, in the hopes of denying Truman–Barkley or Dewey–Warren an overall majority of electoral votes, and thus throwing the presidential election to the United States House of Representatives and the vice presidential election to the United States Senate. Once in the House and Senate, the Dixiecrats hoped to throw their support to whichever party would agree to their segregationist demands. Even if the Republican ticket won an outright majority of electoral votes (as many expected in 1948), the Dixiecrats hoped that their third-party run would help the South retake its dominant position in the Democratic Party. In implementing their strategy, the States' Rights Democrats faced a complicated set of state election laws, with different states having different processes for choosing presidential electors. The States' Rights Democrats eventually succeeded in making the Thurmond–Wright ticket the official Democratic ticket in Alabama, Louisiana, Mississippi, and South Carolina. In other states, they were forced to run as a third-party ticket.

In numbers greater than the 6,000 that attended the first, the States' Rights Democrats held a boisterous second convention in Oklahoma City, on August 14, 1948, where they adopted their party platform which stated:

We stand for the segregation of the races and the racial integrity of each race; the constitutional right to choose one's associates; to accept private employment without governmental interference, and to earn one's living in any lawful way. We oppose the elimination of segregation, the repeal of miscegenation statutes, the control of private employment by Federal bureaucrats called for by the misnamed civil rights program. We favor home-rule, local self-government and a minimum interference with individual rights.

The platform went on to say:

We call upon all Democrats and upon all other loyal Americans who are opposed to totalitarianism at home and abroad to unite with us in ignominiously defeating Harry S. Truman, Thomas E. Dewey and every other candidate for public office who would establish a Police Nation in the United States of America.

In Arkansas, Democratic gubernatorial nominee Sid McMath vigorously supported Truman in speeches across the state, much to the consternation of the sitting governor, Benjamin Travis Laney, an ardent Thurmond supporter. Laney later used McMath's pro-Truman stance against him in the 1950 gubernatorial election, but McMath won re-election handily. Efforts by States' Rights Democrats to paint other Truman loyalists as turncoats generally failed, although the seeds of discontent were planted which in years to come took their toll on Southern moderates. On election day in 1948, the Thurmond–Wright ticket carried the previously solidly Democratic states of Alabama, Louisiana, Mississippi, and South Carolina, receiving 1,169,021 popular votes and 39 electoral votes. Progressive Party presidential nominee Henry A. Wallace drew off a nearly equal number of popular votes (1,157,172) from the Democrats' left wing, although he did not carry any states. The splits in the Democratic Party in the 1948 election had been expected to produce a victory by GOP presidential nominee Dewey, but Truman defeated Dewey in an upset victory.

== Opposition to the Dixiecrat Party ==
Opposition to the Dixiecrat Party between the years of 1948 and 1950 came from a combination of groups like African American voters, white Democrats against segregation, and labor activists that were against segregation. Anti-Dixiecrat groups and organizers exercised dual actions by addressing both Black and white audiences while continuing to remain loyal to the Democratic party. Supporting anti-segregation and President Truman’s agenda aimed to gain rights and protections for African Americans and other marginalized groups.

A prominent figure in the opposition of the Dixiecrat party was Black newspaper publisher, civil right activist, and political leader John H. McCray. McCray organized and challenged the segregationist agenda of the States’ Rights Democratic Party and helped to coordinate African American political participation, voting drives, and also exercised dual actions through his support of the Democratic Party and President Truman’s efforts in his civil rights agenda. John H. McCray contributed to weakening the idea of the "Solid South" and helped lay the groundwork to expand rights and protections for African Americans in the south along with Truman’s agenda. John H. McCray’s work during the late 1940s led to the creation and purpose of the Progressive Democratic Party (PDP). The PDP played a key role in opposing the States’ Rights Democratic Party and helped shift Southern politics by mobilizing Black voters and challenging segregationist control while continuing loyalty to the national Democratic Party.

== Subsequent elections ==
The States' Rights Democratic Party collapsed after the 1948 election. Some Southern political figures, such as Leander Perez of Louisiana, attempted to keep it in existence in their districts. Wright continued to defend racial segregation but conceded that complete obstinance along the lines of the 1948 departure from the Democratic Party would cause his home state of Mississippi to lose "its standing with everybody in America." Former Dixiecrats received some backlash at the 1952 Democratic National Convention, but all Southern delegations were seated after agreeing to a party loyalty pledge. Segregationist Alabama Senator John Sparkman was selected as the Democratic vice-presidential nominee in 1952, helping to boost party loyalty in the South.

=== Legacy ===
The Dixiecrats are considered to have begun the weakening of the Democratic Solid South.

Republican Dwight D. Eisenhower won several Southern states in the 1952 and 1956 presidential elections. In the 1956 election, former commissioner of internal revenue T. Coleman Andrews received just under 0.2 percent of the popular vote running as the presidential nominee of the States' Rights Party. In the 1960 presidential election, Republican Richard Nixon won several Southern states, and Senator Harry F. Byrd of Virginia received the votes of several unpledged electors from Alabama and Mississippi. In the 1964 presidential election, Republican Barry Goldwater won all four states that Thurmond had carried in 1948. In the 1968 presidential election, Republican Richard Nixon or third-party candidate George Wallace won every former Confederate state except Texas. Thurmond eventually left the Democratic Party and joined the Republican Party in 1964, charging the Democrats with having "abandoned the people" and having repudiated the U.S. Constitution; he subsequently worked on the presidential campaign of Barry Goldwater. Within the next few decades, a realignment took place whereby most conservatives (economic, cultural, and racial conservatives included) migrated to the Republican Party, with liberals on the same issues going to the Democrats, resulting in more heterogenous national platforms. The Southern states subsequently shifted over time to voting mainly Republican, with the Northeast switching to voting mainly Democratic.

By the early 2010s, statistician and political analyst Nate Cohn wrote of the "demise of the Southern Democrat."

== Presidential candidate performance ==
Year	Presidential candidate	VP	Popular votes	Percentage	Electoral votes
1948	Strom Thurmond	Fielding L. Wright	1,175,930 (3rd)	2.4%	39

== See also ==
- 1944 Texas Regulars
- Boll weevil (politics)
- Filibustering
- Politics of the Southern United States
- Southern Democrats
- National States' Rights Party (ran in 1960 and 1964)

== Works cited ==
- Smith, James Patterson (2019). "Fielding L. Wright (1946-1952): Legacy of a White-Supremacist Progressive" (PDF). The Journal of Mississippi History. LXXXI (1–2): 61–80. ISSN 0022-2771.
