= Lighthouse and Informer =

Defunct African American newspaper in South Carolina

The Lighthouse and Informer, originally the Charleston Lighthouse, was an African American newspaper in South Carolina. It was founded by journalist John Henry McCray in 1939, and it merged with the Sumter Informer in 1941, when it moved from Charleston to Columbia. It supported racial equality, denounced separate but equal educational facilities and unequal teacher pay, sought to increase black civic engagement, and endorsed non-segregationist candidates for political office. Though it was a powerful newspaper, it suffered financial difficulties due to the conviction of McCray on libel and parole-related charges, and it declared bankruptcy and dissolved in 1954.

== Background ==
A few years after graduating from college, John Henry McCray founded the Charleston Lighthouse in 1939. It was printed by one of McCray's associates in Savannah, Georgia, and distributed in Charleston, South Carolina. In the paper's earliest issues, it attacked the president and board of Allen University, a historically black university in Columbia ran by the African Methodist Episcopal Church, for misusing funds. McCray's paper argued that Samuel J. Higgins, the principal of Charleston's Burke High School, be made the university's president. The board acquiesced to the paper's suggestion, and Higgins became a proponent of the paper as a result. Among its other articles were expositions of racially motivated police brutality in the city and arguments against legally codified racial discrimination and separation (Jim Crow).

Following the publication of one article about racial discrimination, McCray was arrested by Charleston police, and the fee to publish the paper was increased tenfold. He met with journalist Esau Parker, the owner of the Sumter Informer, and the two agreed to merge their papers under the name Lighthouse and Informer in Columbia.

== Publication ==
The first issue of the Lighthouse and Informer was released on December 7, 1941, the same day as the attack on Pearl Harbor by the Imperial Japanese Navy Air Service. During the course of the war, McCray personally supported the Double V campaign – a political agenda to establish political freedom abroad and within the United States, especially for African Americans – but the paper was more restrained. While the paper pushed for the ideas encompassed in the Double V campaign, it did not use the iconography or symbolism of the campaign itself, instead relying on stories of patriotism by African American soldiers abroad. Though some of its messaging was subdued, it also expressed its displeasure (with great "assertiveness", as historian Sid Bedingfield writes) with various racial inequalities in the state. In addition to its political orientation, the paper also published personal stories of black South Carolinans (including news of deaths, travels, and cultural events), fiction (including a serialized form of the novel Native Son by Richard Wright), and sports news.

The paper was a staunch defender of the NAACP and black press. Several attempts were made to quash the NAACP, but the paper asked its readers to create new chapters, contribute to existing ones, and to continually support the organization. It decried black Southerners who undermined the civil rights work the NAACP performed, either through inaction (the "I Dunnits") or through active subversion (the "I Killits"). When the NAACP began to publicize the realities of so-called separate but equal education in the 1940s – a bipartite racially segregated scheme – the Lighthouse and Informer supported the NAACP and requested that black teachers demand equal pay and treatment. In 1944, after the Lighthouse and Informer requested that a lawsuit be initiated on behalf of teacher Viola Louise Duvall for race-based pay differences, Thurgood Marshall took up the case; state judge Julius Waties Waring (himself a reader of the paper) decided in Duvall v. School Board that teacher pay must be equalized.

That same year, the paper declared the establishment of the Progressive Democratic Party (PDP; originally intended to be named the South Carolina Colored Democratic Party), which sought to increase political engagement by black South Carolinans. The Lighthouse and Informer endorsed the campaign of PDP co-founder Osceola E. McKaine for Senate in that year's election (who lost), and McCray sent an alternate delegation to that year's Democratic National Convention to contest racial segregation in the party.

In 1947, the paper published an editorial by the NAACP's president rejecting the separate but equal doctrine. The next year, South Carolina senator Strom Thurmond ran in the presidential election. The Lighthouse and Informer requested that black South Carolinans instead vote for incumbent president Harry S. Truman, who advanced racial equality in voting; Truman won, though Thurmond won South Carolina and two other Southern states. It portrayed Thurmond an "inciter of [...] the Ku Klux Klan" with "anti-Semitic, anti-Negro, anti-Catholic" tendencies.

McCray, writing in the paper, argued in support of the ongoing legal case of Briggs v. Elliott; he wrote that the government "will never do justice to the Negro until and unless it is beaten over the head with a federal court blackjack". In 1950, he was arrested and convicted for criminal libel in connection to an execution authorized by an all-white jury; he blamed the arrest (and a subsequent arrest for violating parole) on his relation to the Lighthouse and Informer, which governor James F. Byrnes read. Historian Kari Frederickson writes that Byrnes actively sabotaged McCray's life and ended his parolee status, leading to his arrest.

During the 1950 senate election, the paper endorsed Olin D. Johnston over Strom Thurmond; Johnston won the election due to the support of black voters.

== Demise and cultural legacy ==
In 1954, a short time before the Supreme Court of the United States ruled in Brown v. Board of Education that a bipartite racially segregated school system was unconstitutional, McCray left the paper to work at the Baltimore Afro-American. The paper was experiencing financial difficulties – some readers were not paying for their subscriptions and McCray had extensive debt following his 1952 prison term – leading to it declaring bankruptcy in 1954. That year, under the leadership of Modjeska Monteith Simkins, the paper dissolved and its facilities were sold.

The paper and Columbia's Palmetto Leader are described by historian Theodore Hemmingway as "the principal voices of black protest in the state". He argues that the paper was one of the most significant black newspapers in the state at the time, and its focus on racial inequalities – a subject the Palmetto Leader rarely discussed in detail – was highly effective.

In a statement prior to his filibuster of the Civil Rights Act of 1957, Thurmond cited the Lighthouse and Informer's finding of extensive black voting in 1952 and 1956; he claimed that due to high voter turnout, a bill enacting civil protections for black voters was unnecessary.
