= Wyndham Meredith Manning =

American politician

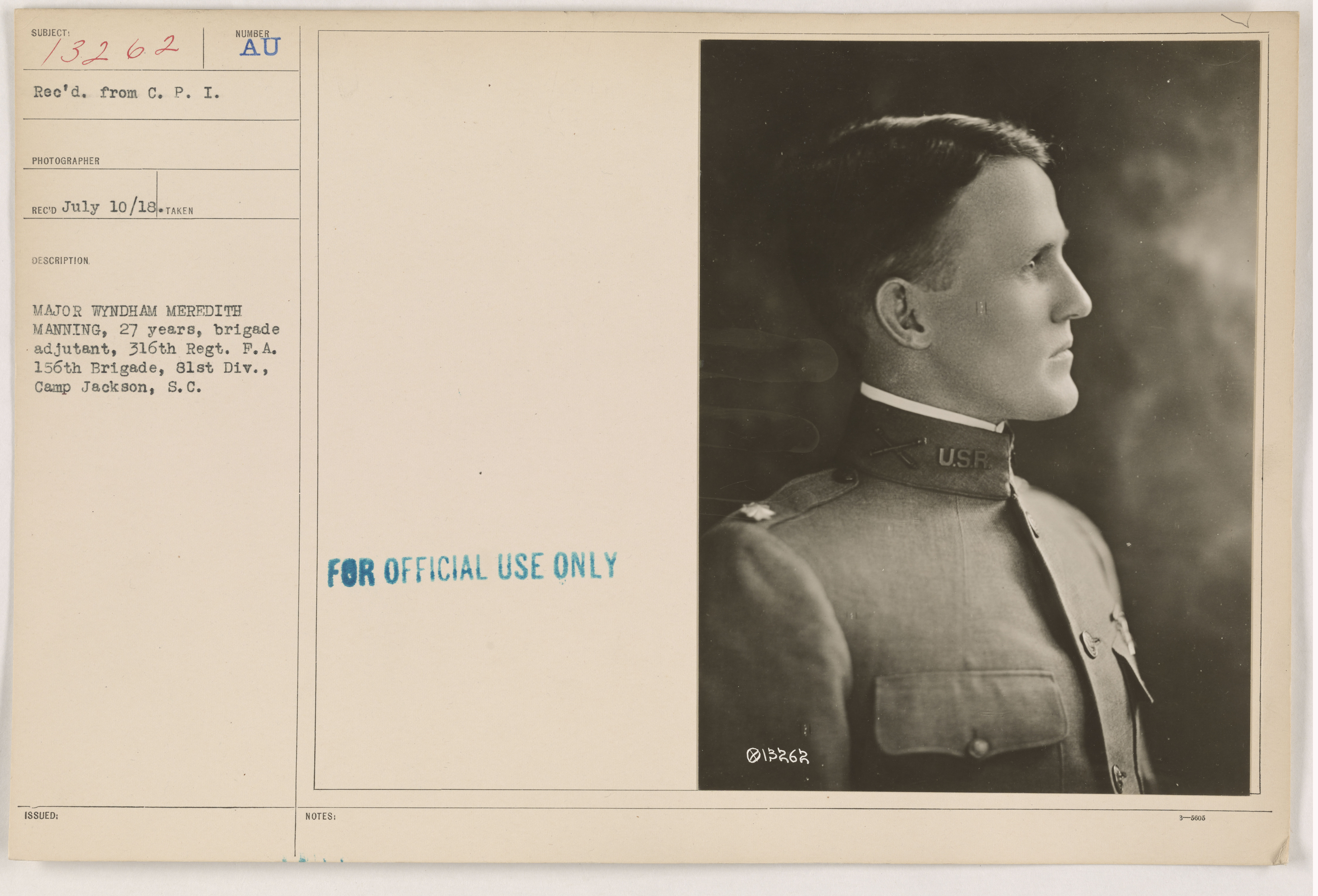
Manning in 1918.

Wyndham Meredith Manning (1890–1967) was a South Carolina politician. Manning served in the South Carolina House of Representatives and was appointed Superintendent of the state's prison system by then Governor Strom Thurmond in 1947, serving in that position until his retirement in 1962. Manning's father, Richard Irvine Manning III and his great-grandfather, Richard Irvine Manning I had previously served as Governors of South Carolina, but Wyndham Meredith Manning lost three gubernatorial elections and never achieved his dream of following in their footsteps.

== Early life and military career ==
Manning was born in 1890 on a farm near Wedgefield in Sumter County, South Carolina. He was one of thirteen children of Richard Irvine Manning III and Leila B. Meredith. Manning entered the United States Military Academy (also known as West Point) in 1907. He graduated in 1913 and was subsequently commissioned as a Second Lieutenant in the United States Army. One year later, Manning resigned from the Army and became a teacher in Berkeley County. Manning's teaching career was interrupted by the U.S.-Mexican War, and he left for Texas in June, 1916 as commander of the Charleston Light Dragoon, a National Guard unit. Following his return from Texas, Manning served briefly as Commandant of Cadets at the Porter Military Academy (now the Porter-Gaud School), before leaving to serve as an artillery officer in World War I.

Manning served with the 316th Field Artillery in France and was promoted all the way to Lieutenant Colonel before returning to South Carolina in 1919. He worked as a farmer and businessman until beginning his political career in 1930.

== Political career ==
Manning was elected to fill a vacant seat in the South Carolina House of Representatives in 1930 and reelected in 1932 and 1934. During his tenure in the State House, Manning served on the powerful Ways and Means Committee and sponsored a variety of bills. In the 1934 gubernatorial election, Manning placed third in the Democratic primary, losing to Olin D. Johnston and Coleman Livingston Blease. Since Democrats dominated politics in the South during that time period, victory in the primary meant certain victory in the general election.

Manning did not return to the legislature after his first defeat, but instead returned to farming and made a second attempt at the governorship in the 1938 election. This time, he fared better, defeating Blease and placing second to Burnet Rhett Maybank with a strong enough result to qualify for the runoff, which he lost by less than 15,000 votes. Again, Manning returned to farming, but decided to run a third time in 1942 election, facing off against his old opponent, Olin Johnston. Manning lost by less than 4%.

Although Manning would never again run for political office, he continued his career as a public servant for another 20 years. During World War II, Manning was placed in charge of the 8,000 prisoners-of-war held in camps at Fort Jackson. In 1947, Manning was appointed head of the South Carolina prison system, and he served in that position until his retirement in 1962.

Wyndham Meredith Manning died in 1967 at the age of 77.
