= 1934 South Carolina gubernatorial election =

1934 South Carolina gubernatorial primary runoff
- September 11, 1934
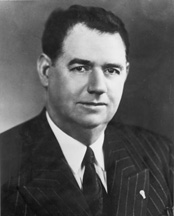

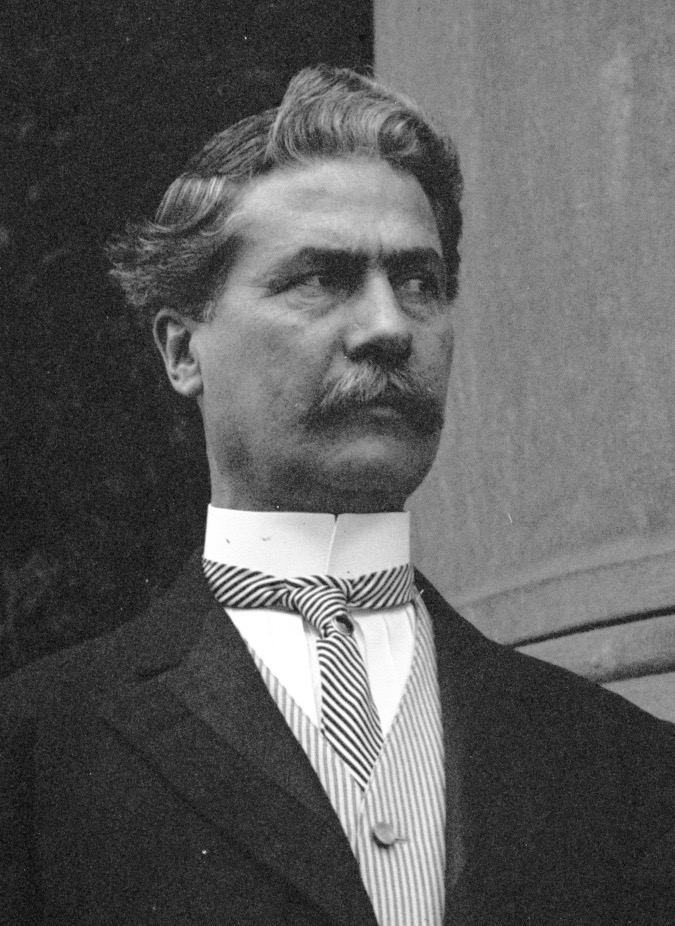
Nominee	Olin Johnston	Cole Blease
Party	Democratic	Democratic
Popular vote	157,673	122,876
Percentage	56.20%	43.80%
- County results Johnston: 50–60% 60–70% 70–80% Blease: 50–60% 60–70%
Governor before election
Ibra Charles Blackwood
Democratic
Elected Governor
Olin D. Johnston
Democratic

The 1934 South Carolina gubernatorial election was held on November 6, 1934, to select the governor of the state of South Carolina. Olin D. Johnston won the contested Democratic primary and ran unopposed in the general election becoming the 98th governor of South Carolina.

== Democratic primary ==
=== Candidates ===
- Cole L. Blease, former Governor (1911–15) and United States Senator (1925–31)
- Kemper Cooke
- Olin D. Johnston, former State Representative from Spartanburg and candidate for Governor in 1930
- Wyndham Meredith Manning, State Representative from Stateburg and son of former Governor Richard Irvine Manning III
- L.B. Owens
- Thomas B. Pearce
- James O. Sheppard
- C.E. Sloan

The South Carolina Democratic Party held their primary for governor in the summer of 1934 and it attracted many politicians because of the change in 1926 to the South Carolina constitution providing for a four-year term. Johnston emerged victorious from the runoff against former Governor Cole Blease and ran without opposition on account of South Carolina's effective status as a one-party state.

Democratic Primary
Candidate	Votes	%
Olin D. Johnston	104,799	36.5
Coleman Livingston Blease	85,795	29.8
Wyndham Meredith Manning	55,767	19.4
Thomas B. Pearce	26,328	9.2
Kemper Cooke	7,390	2.6
L.B. Owens	4,186	1.4
James O. Sheppard	2,482	0.9
C.E. Sloan	683	0.2

Democratic Primary Runoff
Candidate	Votes	%	±%
Olin D. Johnston	157,673	56.2	+19.7
Coleman Livingston Blease	122,876	43.8	+14.0

== General election ==
The general election was held on November 6, 1934, and Olin D. Johnston was elected the next governor of South Carolina without opposition. Being a non-presidential election and few contested races, turnout was much lower than the Democratic primary election.

South Carolina Gubernatorial Election, 1934
Party	Candidate	Votes	%	±%
Democratic	Olin D. Johnston	22,873	100.00	0.0
Majority		22,873	100.00	0.0
Turnout		22,873		
Democratic hold				

65+% won by Johnston

== See also ==
- Governor of South Carolina
- List of governors of South Carolina
- South Carolina gubernatorial elections

Preceded by 1930	South Carolina gubernatorial elections	Succeeded by 1938
