= Willie Tolbert =

Willie James Tolbert (1924 – October 28, 1949) was an African-American man from Greenwood, South Carolina, who was convicted of raping a 16-year-old white girl on August 8, 1949, and executed by electric chair on October 28, 1949. AP News stories about the three-day manhunt, trial, and execution of Tolbert were picked up by papers across the nation. Tolbert maintained in interviews with his lawyer and the press that the sex he had with the girl was consensual and that he was unable to testify in his own defense during the trial since he was warned not to by the county sheriff. Two separate reporters, Deling Booth and John Henry McCray, who published articles providing Tolbert's version of the events were charged with criminal libel following Tolbert's execution.

== Arrest ==
According to newspaper reports, a 16-year-old white girl and her white boyfriend, 17-year-old Sammy Cassels (also reported as Sam or Sammy Castles), were parked on the side of an isolated road when Tolbert approached their car on foot asking for a match to light his cigarette. The girl, alarmed by the unexpected appearance of Tolbert, got out of the car and attempted to run away. Tolbert chased after her, caught her by the arm, and dragged her back to the vehicle where he allegedly raped her in the presence of her boyfriend. Cassels claimed he did not try to intervene because Tolbert, though unarmed, threatened to kill the girl if Cassels tried to stop him.

Following the assault, the teenagers testified that Tolbert kidnapped them and drove them around for about two hours on the rural roads of Greenwood and neighboring Laurens County at speeds sometimes reaching 100 miles per hour, threatening to kill them all by wrecking the car if the teenaged couple made any attempt to escape. Tolbert allegedly pulled over the car at some point during this period of time and raped the girl a second time. After a few hours, Tolbert returned to approximately the same place where he first abducted the couple. They said that Tolbert told them he was going to hop a freight train out of town and exclaimed "some Negro will die for this but it won't be me" before fleeing from the scene.

A manhunt for Tolbert ensued, enlisting the efforts of hundreds of armed volunteers from the Greenwood area. As the manhunt dragged on unsuccessfully, crosses were burned outside of African-American businesses in downtown Greenwood in apparent response to the alleged crime. Tolbert, who had taken refuge at his mother's house after evading the search parties in the woods for the previous three days, surrendered himself to authorities. Out of concern for Tolbert's safety, the sheriff immediately rushed Tolbert to the prison in nearby Columbia, South Carolina, where he was held for questioning and, according to the sheriff, confessed to raping the girl.

== Trial ==
Tolbert's trial began on September 12, 1949, with Judge J. Henry Johnson of Allendale presiding. Solicitor Jeff Griffith of Saluda stood in as prosecuting attorney for Solicitor Hugh Beasley of Greenwood whose daughter was the alleged victim of the crime. Tolbert was represented by Columbia attorney Harold Boulware, Jr., the first African-American lawyer to try a case in Greenwood County.

Since no African-American jurors were included in the grand jury pool, Boulware initiated the trial with a motion to quash the first indictment on the grounds that Tolbert's right to a trial by jury of his peers was being violated. Johnson granted the motion and a second grand jury was promptly convened that included one African-American juror. The second grand jury upheld Tolbert's indictment, and the trial proceeded with an all-white trial jury.

The prosecution built their case primarily on the testimony of Greenwood Sheriff J. Cal White, the arresting officer who reported Tolbert had confessed to the crime, as well as the testimony of the young couple who were the alleged victims of the crime. FBI investigators who searched the car where the crime had allegedly taken place also testified to finding "Negro" hair as well as a button and threads matching those from the clothing Tolbert was wearing at the time.

Tolbert declined the opportunity to take the stand in his own defense, a move that surprised many people at the trial, including his attorney who explained to the judge that Tolbert had, until that morning, been planning to testify. With no other witnesses to call, the testimony of the prosecution's witnesses remained unchallenged. The defense attorney's closing arguments emphasized that the jury should consider Tolbert's lack of education and opportunity as mitigating circumstances in the crime. Boulware also reminded the jury that Tolbert had consumed at least a pint of whiskey that day and was therefore too drunk to be accountable for his actions at the time of the crime.

The jury deliberated for less than 10 minutes before returning a guilty verdict. After the jury declined to make a recommendation of mercy, Judge Johnson sentenced Tolbert to death by electrocution.

== Execution ==
Tolbert was executed in the state's electric chair on morning of October 28, 1949, at the South Carolina Penitentiary in Columbia, South Carolina. More than 60 people attended, including the father and brother of the victim. Tolbert's last words were, "I want everyone to pray and meet me in heaven. God is with me."

== Controversy ==
Some critics, both at the time the crime occurred and more recently, have questioned the accuracy of the testimony used to convict Tolbert. Media historian Sid Bedingfield, for example, has argued that, "The young woman's account of what happened that night was odd, to say the least." Shortly after Tolbert was convicted, Dr. Benjamin E. Mays, who was born and raised in Greenwood County, published an editorial in The Pittsburgh Courier in which he argued that, "for the life of me, I cannot believe the charge."

It doesn't make sense. Here is a white boy, sitting idly by while a Negro, age 24, runs after a white girl, attempts to rape her, brings her back to the car, takes the wheel, drives them around for two hours, attempts to rape the girl a second time, stops for gas at two filling stations, and no outcry is made.

— Dr. Benjamin E. Mays

Though he did not testify in his trial, Tolbert maintained to his lawyers and the press he was innocent of the charges, claiming that the sex he had with the girl was consensual and that Sheriff White had warned him not to take the stand in his defense. The sheriff however claimed that Tolbert confessed to the crime and denied Tolbert's claim that he had been warned by White not to testify.

Efforts to publicly question the legitimacy of Tolbert's conviction were subject to harsh reprisal. Shortly before his execution, John Henry McCray and Deling Booth, two journalists from Columbia, South Carolina, working independently, published news articles in their respective papers providing Tolbert's side of the story. The news stories were based on the account of the events Tolbert provided to his attorney and to Booth during separate interviews. According to Tolbert, the teenaged couple asked him to drive them around in order to help them find liquor to purchase. Tolbert said that, as they were driving around looking for a place to purchase the alcohol, Cassels, who was riding in the backseat with the girl, asked Tolbert to pull the car over to the side of an isolated country road. Tolbert claimed he sat in the front of the car while the young couple had sexual intercourse in the backseat. When Cassels finished, he invited Tolbert to "have a relation" in the backseat with the girl, and Tolbert accepted.

Prominent members of the white community in Greenwood were outraged by the publication of the articles. Greenwood County Solicitor Hugh Beasley, who was the father of the victim, brought criminal libel charges against both Booth and McCray for printing Tolbert's version of the story, despite the fact that, in accordance with South Carolina law, neither journalist disclosed the rape victim's name in the article. The case against Booth was dropped, while McCray, publisher of The Lighthouse and Informer, South Carolina's largest circulating African-American newspaper of that time, was eventually fined $3000 and sentenced to three years of probation. He later served a month on a chain gang in Newberry, South Carolina for violating the terms of his probation when he travelled out of state for a speaking engagement.

== See also ==
- Capital punishment in South Carolina
- List of people executed in South Carolina (pre-1972)
- List of people executed in the United States in 1949
