= Osceola McKaine =

American civil rights activist (1892–1955)

Osceola Enoch McKaine (December 18, 1892 – November 17, 1955) was an American public speaker, businessman, civil rights activist and political candidate. He was a candidate for US Senate in 1944 as part of a Black-led splinter challenge to the Democratic Party.

== Early life and education ==
McKaine was born in Sumter, South Carolina. He had a half-brother, Ansley Abraham. He graduated from Lincoln Graded School in 1908.

== Career ==
After working as a merchant marine, he served in the US Army's 24th Infantry then its 367th Infantry during World War I, traveling to the Philippines, Mexico and France, earning the rank of lieutenant. He returned to the US and resided in New York City, where he was "a leading voice and an organizing force" for the League for Democracy (LFD), a militant organization of black veterans. making public speeches and working as editor of its newspaper, New York Commoner. McKaine was unable to return from WWII and accept segregation after fighting for that same cause overseas.

McKaine relocated to Ghent, Belgium, and owned and operated a supper club / nightclub with a partner. Because of World War II, he returned to his hometown, Sumter, South Carolina, where he headed the local branch of the NAACP. He worked to expand Black political participation in the South during the 1940s. He strived to help register Black voters and challenge the current primary system.

He conducted a survey to report the disparity of white and black teachers' salaries. He continued to find ways to reduce the unfairness of the disparity which resulted in legal actions that involved Thurgood Marshall.

McKaine was an associate editor of the Lighthouse and Informer, a black newspaper. He was the candidate for US Senate for the offshoot political party, the Progressive Democratic Party (organized by McKaine and Lighthouse and Informer''s John McCray), making him the first black candidate to run for statewide office since Reconstruction. Though unsuccessful against the state's sitting governor Olin Johnston, the candidacy brought attention to the black vote, boosting black voter rolls during the 1940s from 3,500 to 50,000 people.

He was involved in other organizations such as the Southern Negro Youth Congress (SNYC) and the Southern Conference of Human Welfare (SCHW)—its first (and only) black field representative.

McKaine returned to Belgium to his supper club work after World War II.

== Personal life ==
McKaine spoke four languages.

He died in Brussels, Belgium, at age 62 and was buried in his hometown, Sumter, South Carolina, at Walker Cemetery.
