= 1926 South Carolina gubernatorial election =

1926 South Carolina Democratic gubernatorial primary runoff
- September 14, 1926
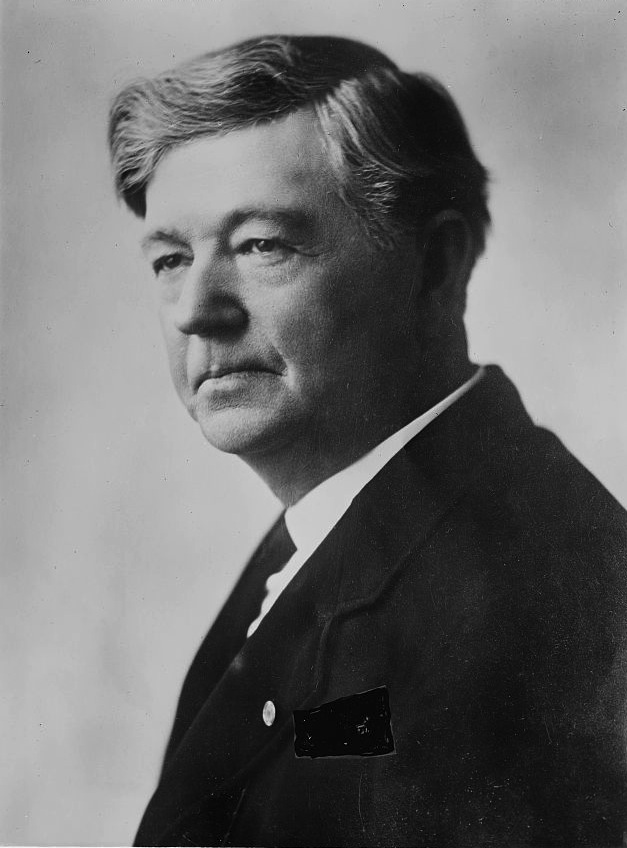

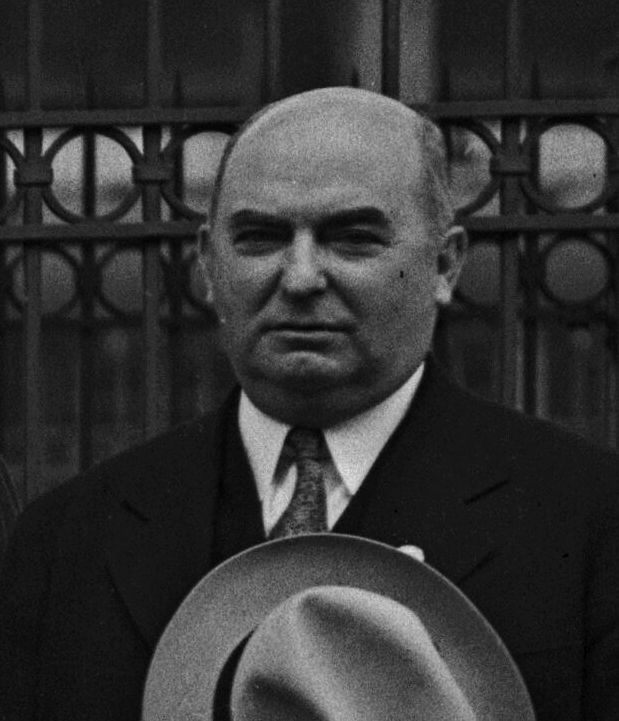
Candidate	John G. Richards	Ibra Blackwood
Party	Democratic	Democratic
Popular vote	95,007	68,224
Percentage	58.20%	41.80%
Governor of South Carolina before election
Thomas Gordon McLeod
Democratic
Elected Governor of South Carolina
John Gardiner Richards Jr.
Democratic

The 1926 South Carolina gubernatorial election was held on November 2, 1926, to select the governor of the state of South Carolina. The South Carolina constitution was amended in 1926 to change the term of governor from two years to four years, but also prohibiting governors from consecutive terms. John Gardiner Richards, Jr. won the contested Democratic primary and ran unopposed in the general election becoming the 96th governor of South Carolina.

== Democratic primary ==
=== Candidates ===
- Ibra Charles Blackwood, former State Representative from Spartanburg
- John T. Duncan, Columbia attorney and perennial candidate
- Edmund B. Jackson, Lieutenant Governor of South Carolina
- George K. Laney, candidate for Governor in 1922
- John J. McMahan
- Carroll D. Nance
- D.A.G. Ouzts
- Thomas H. Peeples, former Attorney General of South Carolina (1913–18)
- John Gardiner Richards Jr., former Railroad Commissioner, State Representative from Liberty Hill, and candidate for Governor in 1914 and 1918

The South Carolina Democratic Party held their primary for governor in the summer of 1926 and it attracted many politicians because of the recent change to the South Carolina constitution providing for a four-year term. Richards emerged victorious from the runoff and effectively became the next governor of South Carolina because there was no opposition in the general election.

Democratic Primary
Candidate	Votes	%
John Gardiner Richards, Jr.	44,906	25.8
Ibra Charles Blackwood	34,870	20.1
Edmund B. Jackson	33,804	19.5
Carroll D. Nance	16,970	9.8
George K. Laney	13,386	7.7
Thomas H. Peeples	10,636	6.1
D.A.G. Ouzts	10,570	6.1
John T. Duncan	6,297	3.6
John J. McMahan	2,300	1.3

Democratic Primary Runoff
Candidate	Votes	%	±%
John Gardiner Richards, Jr.	95,007	58.2	+32.4
Ibra Charles Blackwood	68,224	41.8	+21.7

== General election ==
The general election was held on November 2, 1926, and John Richards was elected the next governor of South Carolina without opposition thanks to the state's suppression of parties other than the ruling Democrats. Being a non-presidential election and few contested races, turnout was the lowest ever for a gubernatorial election in South Carolina.

South Carolina Gubernatorial Election, 1926
Party	Candidate	Votes	%	±%
Democratic	John Gardiner Richards, Jr.	16,589	100.00	0.0
Majority		16,589	100.00	0.0
Turnout		16,589		
Democratic hold				

65+% won by Richards

== See also ==
- Governor of South Carolina
- List of governors of South Carolina
- South Carolina gubernatorial elections

Preceded by 1924	South Carolina gubernatorial elections	Succeeded by 1930
