= 1938 South Carolina gubernatorial election =

1938 South Carolina Democratic gubernatorial primary runoff
- September 13, 1938
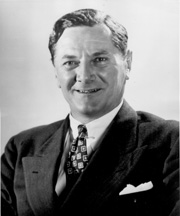

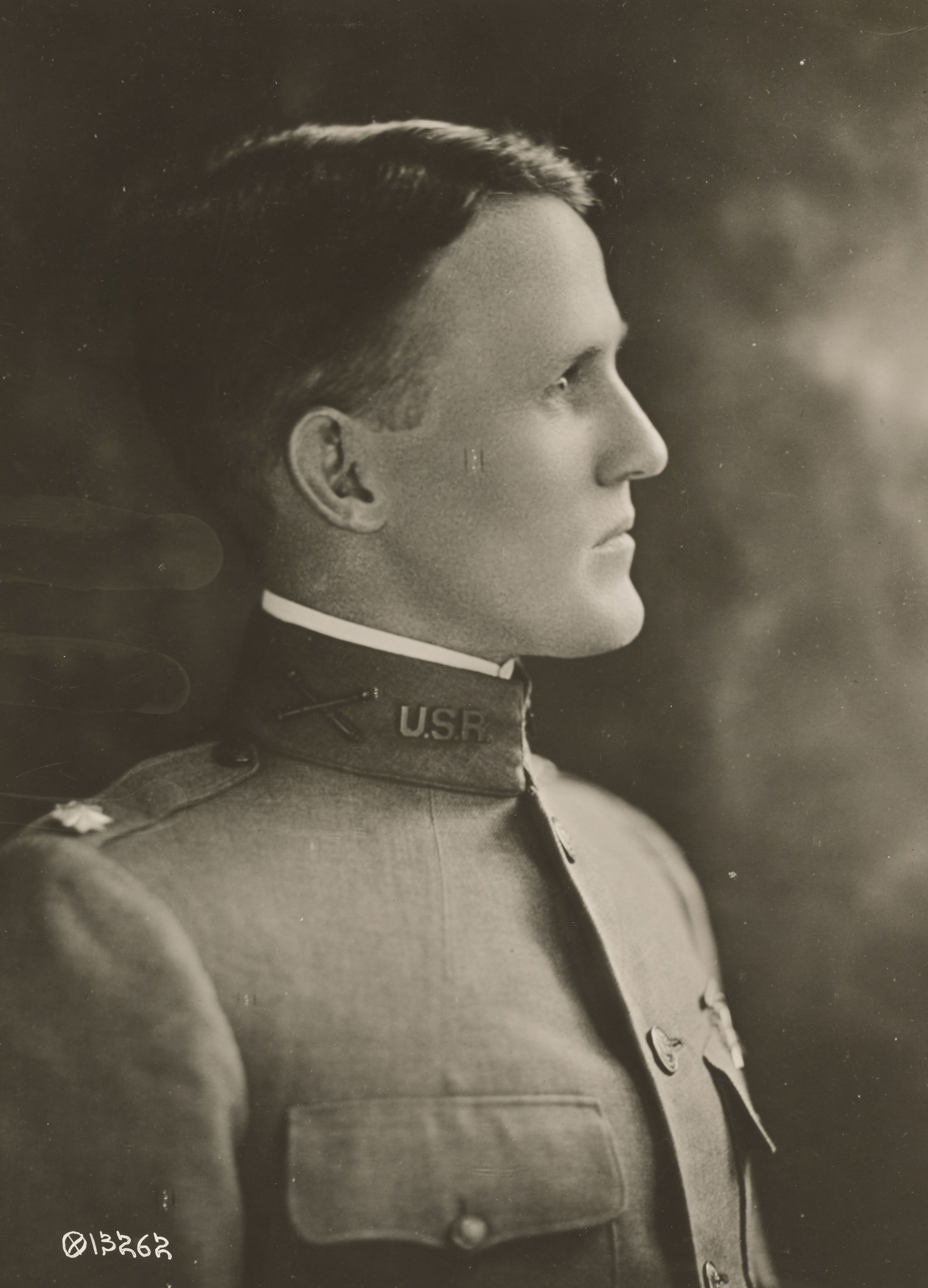
| Nominee | Burnet R. Maybank | Wyndham Manning |
| Party | Democratic | Democratic |
| Popular vote | 163,947 | 149,368 |
| Percentage | 52.33% | 47.67% |
- County results Maybank: 50–60% 60–70% 70–80% 80–90% >90% Manning: 50–60% 60–70% 70–80%
Governor before election
Olin D. Johnston
Democratic
Elected Governor
Burnet R. Maybank
Democratic

The 1938 South Carolina gubernatorial election was held on November 8, 1938, to select the governor of the state of South Carolina. Burnet Rhett Maybank, Mayor of Charleston, South Carolina, won the contested Democratic primary and defeated Republican Joseph Augustis Tolbert in the general election becoming the 99th governor of South Carolina.

== Democratic primary ==
=== Candidates ===
- Ben E. Adams
- Neville Bennett
- D.T. Blackmon
- Cole L. Blease, former Governor (1911–15) and United States Senator (1925–31)
- John Hughes Cooper
- Francis M. Easterling
- Wyndham Meredith Manning, former State Representative from Stateburg and candidate for Governor in 1934
- Burnet Rhett Maybank, mayor of Charleston

The South Carolina Democratic Party held their primary for governor on August 30 and it is noted as being the last attempt by former Governor Cole Blease at becoming governor again. Maybank, the mayor of Charleston, had the support of the Lowcountry and emerged victorious from the runoff on September 13 against Wyndham Manning because the Upstate failed to coalesce around his candidacy.

=== Results ===
Democratic Primary
| Candidate | Votes | % |
|---|---|---|
| Burnet Rhett Maybank | 117,900 | 35.1 |
| Wyndham Meredith Manning | 74,356 | 22.1 |
| Coleman Livingston Blease | 60,823 | 18.1 |
| Neville Bennett | 47,882 | 14.2 |
| Ben E. Adams | 26,376 | 7.9 |
| Francis M. Easterling | 6,877 | 2.0 |
| D.T. Blackmon | 951 | 0.3 |
| John Hughes Cooper | 922 | 0.3 |

Democratic Primary Runoff
| Candidate | Votes | % | ±% |
|---|---|---|---|
| Burnet Rhett Maybank | 163,947 | 52.3 | +17.2 |
| Wyndham Meredith Manning | 149,368 | 47.7 | +25.6 |

== General election ==
The general election was held on November 8, 1938, and Burnet Rhett Maybank was elected the next governor of South Carolina against token Republican candidate Joseph Augustis Tolbert. Being a non-presidential election and few contested races, turnout was much lower than the Democratic primary election. The presence of even a token opposition candidate was unusual for South Carolina at the time.

South Carolina Gubernatorial Election, 1938
| Party | Candidate | Votes | % | ±% |
|---|---|---|---|---|
| Democratic | Burnet Rhett Maybank | 49,009 | 99.43 | −0.6 |
| Republican | Joseph Augustis Tolbert | 283 | 0.57 | +0.6 |
| Majority | | 48,726 | 98.85 | −1.2 |
| Turnout | | 49,292 | | |
| Democratic hold | | | | |

65+% won by Maybank

== See also ==
- Governor of South Carolina
- List of governors of South Carolina
- South Carolina gubernatorial elections

| Preceded by 1934 | South Carolina gubernatorial elections | Succeeded by 1942 |
