= James O. Sheppard =

American politician (1890–1973)

Member of the South Carolina House of Representatives
- In office 1921–1926

73rd Lieutenant Governor of South Carolina
- In office January 20, 1931 – January 15, 1935
- Governor: Ibra Charles Blackwood
- Preceded by: Thomas Bothwell Butler
- Succeeded by: Joseph Emile Harley

Personal details
- Born: James Orlando Sheppard; August 29, 1890
- Died: February 1, 1973 (aged 82)
- Party: Democratic
- Education: University of South Carolina

James Orlando Sheppard (August 29, 1890 – February 1, 1973) was an American politician. He served as 73rd lieutenant governor of South Carolina from 1931 to 1935.

== Life and career ==
Sheppard attended Edgefield High School and the University of South Carolina.

Sheppard served in the South Carolina House of Representatives from 1921 to 1926.

In 1930, Sheppard was elected to the South Carolina lieutenant governorship, succeeding Thomas Bothwell Butler. He served until 1935, when he was succeeded by Joseph Emile Harley.

Sheppard died on February 1, 1973, at the age of 82.
