= E. B. Jackson =

American politician and businessman (1879–1947)

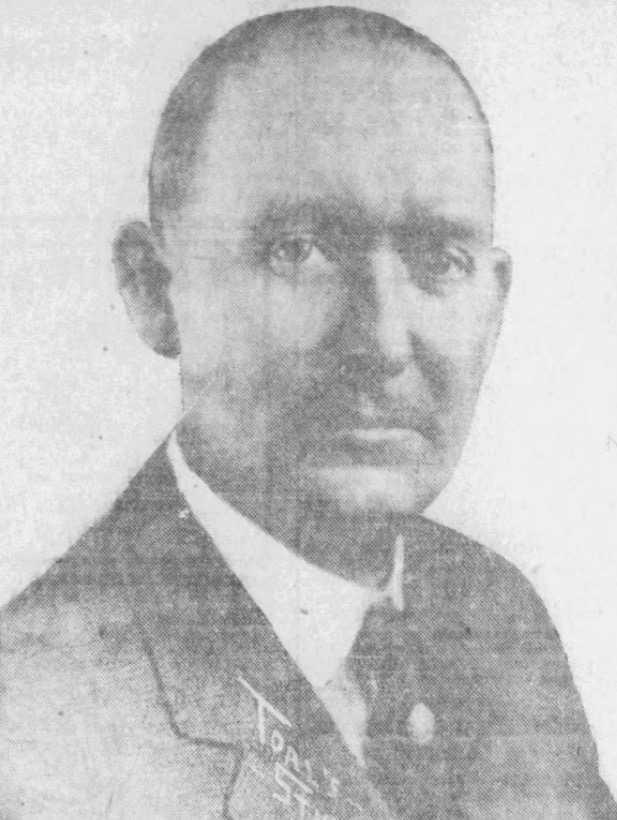
- Jackson in 1923

71st Lieutenant Governor of South Carolina
- In office January 16, 1923 – January 18, 1927
- Governor: Thomas Gordon McLeod
- Preceded by: Wilson Godfrey Harvey
- Succeeded by: Thomas Bothwell Butler

Personal details
- Born: Edmund Bellinger Jackson; June 29, 1879 Aiken County, South Carolina, US
- Died: July 12, 1947 (aged 68) Pelion, South Carolina, US
- Party: Democratic
- Occupation: Politician, businessman

Edmund Bellinger Jackson (June 29, 1879 – July 12, 1947) was an American politician and businessman. A Democrat, he was the Lieutenant Governor of South Carolina, serving under Thomas Gordon McLeod.

== Early life and education ==
Jackson was born on June 29, 1879, in Aiken County, South Carolina, the son of Wiley Quitman Jackson and Laura Ann (née Jeffcoat) Jackson. He grew up poor on a farm in Wagener, studying whenever possible. He studied at The Citadel, graduating in 1901.

== Career ==
In 1901 and 1902, Jackson taught at North Greenville High School; he taught for the school's military department, and as a result was nicknamed "Captain Jackson". In 1903, Jackson returned to Wagener. There, he was assistant principal and later principal of Wagener High School. From 1904 to 1912, he was the cashier of the Bank of Wagener. In 1912, bank President Pickens Gunter was murdered by Mayor Hugh Long, and as a result Jackson became bank President. As President, he improved the loans given to farmers.

Jackson was a Democrat. In 1913, he was part of a committee to discuss the formation of an "Edisto County". He was Lieutenant Governor of South Carolina from January 16, 1923, to January 18, 1927, serving under Thomas Gordon McLeod. During his first election, the Ku Klux Klan boycotted him, though he still won in a landslide. As Lieutenant Governor, he voted in favor of keeping the sugary drink tax. He unsuccessfully ran for Governor in 1926 and 1930. Politically, he was progressive, support the expansion of agriculture and education and women's suffrage.

After serving, Jackson returned to banking. The Bank of Wagener closed in 1929, after a failed consolidation with the Bank of Western North Carolina. In 1933, he moved to Washington, D.C. and became a regional consultant of the Agricultural Adjustment Administration. Later, he helped revitalize agriculture in Puerto Rico. He was also a trustee of Greenville Woman's College.

== Personal life and death ==
Jackson's first wife was Fannie Lybrand, with whom he had two children. She died in 1934, and in 1938, he married Mary Inez Toler, with whom he had one son. He hated alcoholic beverages and was described as being energetic and mannerful. He was a brother-in-law of politician Hampton P. Fulmer. He was a Baptist, with him serving as vice-president of the South Carolina Baptist Convention in 1927. In his later years, he lived in Madison, Georgia. He died on July 12, 1947, aged 68, near Pelion.
