= Midterm =

Midterm can refer to:

- Midterm election
- Midterm exam
