= Lincolnville, South Carolina =

- Town
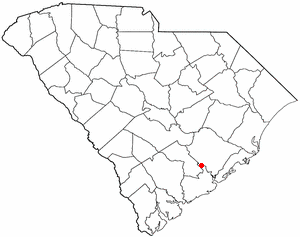
- Location of Lincolnville in South Carolina
- Coordinates: 33°00′18″N 80°9′28″W
- Country: United States
- State: South Carolina
- Counties: Charleston, Dorchester

Area
  - Total: 1.20 sq mi (3.12 km^{2})
  - Land: 1.20 sq mi (3.12 km^{2})
  - Water: 0 sq mi (0.00 km^{2})
- Elevation: 79 ft (24 m)

Population (2020)
  - Total: 1,147
  - Density: 953.0/sq mi (367.96/km^{2})
- Time zone: UTC-5 (EST)
  - Summer (DST): UTC-4 (EDT)
- ZIP code: 29485
- Area codes: 843 and 854
- FIPS code: 45-41740
- GNIS feature ID: 2406021
- Website: https://www.lincolnvillesc.gov/

Lincolnville is a town in Charleston County, South Carolina, United States. A very small portion of the town extends into Dorchester County. The population was 1,147 at the 2020 census.

Lincolnville is part of the Charleston-North Charleston-Summerville metropolitan area.

== Geography ==
Lincolnville is bordered by the town of Summerville to the north, west, and south. Lincoln Avenue is the main street through the town, leading northwest towards the center of Summerville and southeast into Ladson. Downtown Charleston is 23 miles (37 km) to the southeast.

According to the United States Census Bureau, Lincolnville has a total area of 1.2 square miles (3.1 km^{2}), all land.

== Demographics ==
Historical population
Census	Pop.	Note	%±
1880	350		—
1890	388		10.9%
1900	40		−89.7%
1910	341		752.5%
1920	247		−27.6%
1930	600		142.9%
1940	261		−56.5%
1950	278		6.5%
1960	420		51.1%
1970	504		20.0%
1980	808		60.3%
1990	716		−11.4%
2000	904		26.3%
2010	1,139		26.0%
2020	1,147		0.7%
U.S. Decennial Census

=== 2020 census ===
Lincolnville racial composition
Race	Num.	Perc.
White (non-Hispanic)	394	34.35%
Black or African American (non-Hispanic)	500	43.59%
Native American	10	0.87%
Asian	9	0.78%
Pacific Islander	1	0.09%
Other/Mixed	79	6.89%
Hispanic or Latino	154	13.43%

As of the 2020 United States census, there were 1,147 people, 806 households, and 461 families residing in the town.

=== 2000 census ===
As of the census of 2000, there were 904 people, 347 households, and 232 families residing in the town. The population density was 794.1 inhabitants per square mile (306.6/km^{2}). There were 371 housing units at an average density of 325.9 per square mile (125.8/km^{2}). The racial makeup of the town was 50.66% White, 45.80% African American, 1.22% Native American, 0.33% from other races, and 1.99% from two or more races. Hispanic or Latino of any race were 1.00% of the population.

There were 347 households, out of which 30.3% had children under the age of 18 living with them, 40.3% were married couples living together, 20.7% had a female householder with no husband present, and 33.1% were non-families. 26.2% of all households were made up of individuals, and 7.2% had someone living alone who was 65 years of age or older. The average household size was 2.59 and the average family size was 3.13.

In the town, the population was spread out, with 28.4% under the age of 18, 6.4% from 18 to 24, 30.2% from 25 to 44, 23.7% from 45 to 64, and 11.3% who were 65 years of age or older. The median age was 35 years. For every 100 females, there were 101.3 males. For every 100 females age 18 and over, there were 97.9 males.

The median income for a household in the town was $29,583, and the median income for a family was $31,932. Males had a median income of $30,114 versus $20,000 for females. The per capita income for the town was $16,311. About 21.0% of families and 23.5% of the population were below the poverty line, including 33.2% of those under age 18 and 23.4% of those age 65 or over.

== History ==
Lincolnville was founded in 1867 by seven African-American men, including Reverend Richard Harvey Cain, Daniel Adger, Marc Buffett, Reverend Lewis Ruffin Nichols, Hector Grant, Reverend M.B. Salters and Walter Steele, who left their former home of Charleston to escape the racial discrimination they felt subject to in that environment. Amos Williams joined them as a signer of Lincolnville's original charter. Riding the local South Carolina Special train to examine properties for sale by the South Carolina Railroad Company, the men settled on this area that was then known as "Pump Pond" for its use as a train stopping point for water, wood and coal. The men signed a contract with the railroad company to purchase 620 acres (2.5 km^{2}) for $1,000.

After paying the agreed amount in full, a charter for establishment of the town was applied for and later received on December 14, 1889. The name "Lincolnville" was given to the settlement in honor of Abraham Lincoln.

== Government ==
The city is run by an elected mayor–council government system. The mayor is Enoch Dickerson as of November 2021. The city council members include James C. Hampton, Larry Brown, Betty J. Weldon, Tyrone E. Aiken, Karla K. Locklear.

== Notable person ==
- John Henry McCray (1910–1987), African American journalist, politician and civil rights activist; raised in Lincolnville.
