= John C. Calhoun State Office Building =

- U.S. National Register of Historic Places
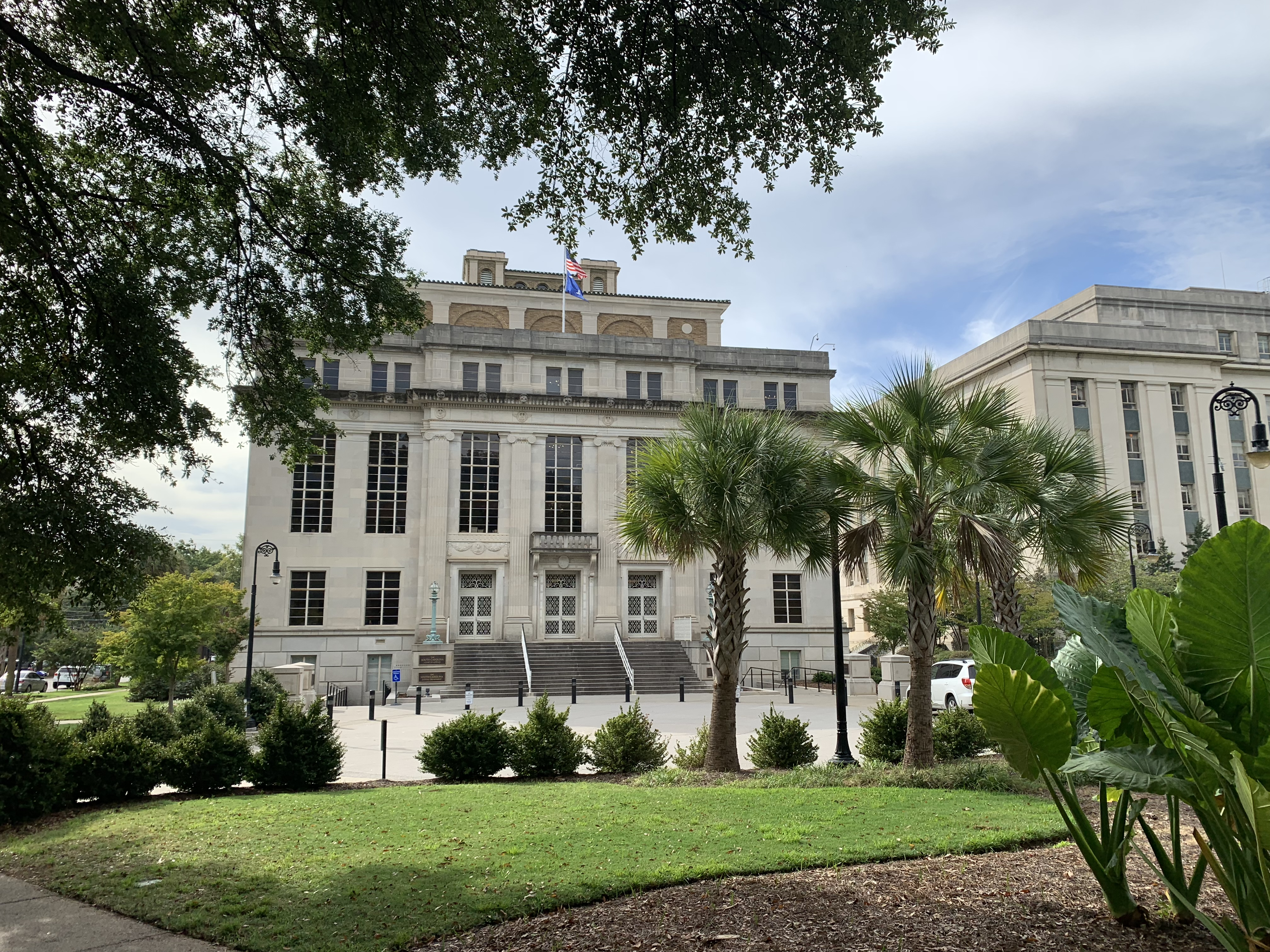

- Location within South Carolina Location within the United States
- Location: 1015 Sumter St., Columbia, South Carolina
- Coordinates: 33°59′57″N 81°01′51″W
- Area: Less than one acre
- Built: 1926
- Architect: Medary, Milton; Tatum, Harold
- Architectural style: Renaissance Revival
- NRHP reference No.: 11000703
- Added to NRHP: September 23, 2011

John C. Calhoun State Office Building is a historic office building located at Columbia, South Carolina. It was built in 1926, and is a five-story, I-shaped limestone clad building over a raised basement in the Italian Renaissance Revival style. It housed the South Carolina State Highway Department until 1952. The National Guard seized and occupied the Calhoun Building from October to December 1935 under the orders of Governor Olin D. Johnston.

It was added to the National Register of Historic Places in 2011.
