= Joseph Emile Harley =

American politician (1880–1942)

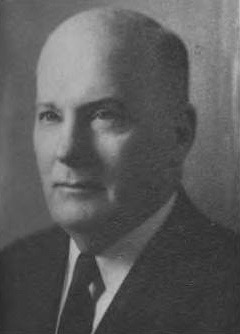

100th Governor of South Carolina
- In office November 4, 1941 – February 27, 1942
- Lieutenant: Vacant
- Preceded by: Burnet R. Maybank
- Succeeded by: Richard Manning Jefferies

74th Lieutenant Governor of South Carolina
- In office January 15, 1935 – November 4, 1941
- Governor: Olin D. Johnston; Burnet R. Maybank
- Preceded by: James Sheppard
- Succeeded by: Ransome Judson Williams

Mayor of Barnwell, South Carolina
- In office 1912–1922

Member of the South Carolina House of Representatives from Barnwell County
- In office January 11, 1927 – January 13, 1931
- In office January 10, 1905 – January 12, 1909

Personal details
- Born: September 14, 1880 Williston, South Carolina, United States
- Died: February 27, 1942 (aged 61)
- Resting place: Baptist Cemetery, Barnwell, South Carolina
- Party: Democratic
- Spouse: Agnes Richardson
- Education: University of South Carolina
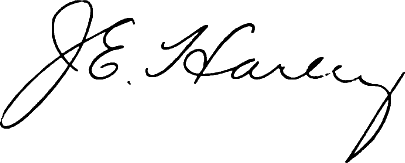
- Signature

Military service
- Allegiance: United States
- Branch/service: United States Army
- Rank: Sergeant
- Unit: 1st South Carolina Volunteers
- Battles/wars: Spanish–American War

Joseph Emile Harley (September 14, 1880 – February 27, 1942) was the 100th governor of South Carolina from 1941 to 1942 and a member of the "Barnwell Ring."

== Early life and education ==
Harley was born September 14, 1880, in Williston, South Carolina. Harley received an LLB from the University of South Carolina in 1902. He married Sarah Agnes Richardson and had three children with her.

== Occupations ==
Harley served as a colonel in the South Carolina National Guard and as sergeant of Company L, 1st SC Volunteers in the Spanish–American War. He also worked as a lawyer, where he fought on behalf of three major railway companies including: the Atlantic Coast Line Railroad, Southern Railway, as well as the Seaboard Airline Railroad. As a member of the Democratic Party, Harley was a delegate at the 1908, 1924, 1928, and 1932 party conventions. Harley also served as the mayor of Barnwell, South Carolina for ten years from 1912 to 1922.

== Governor ==
As the 74th lieutenant governor of South Carolina (from 1935 to 1941), Harley became governor on November 4, 1941, upon the resignation of Governor Burnet Maybank, who was elected to serve in the US Senate.

On February 27, 1942, Governor Harley died in office after serving only four months. He died of terminal throat cancer. Harley could only communicate by writing in the last months of his life. He is buried in Baptist Cemetery, Barnwell, South Carolina.

Political offices
Preceded by James Sheppard	Lieutenant Governor of South Carolina; 1935–1941	Succeeded by Ransome Judson Williams
Preceded by Burnet R. Maybank	Governor of South Carolina; 1941–1942	Succeeded by Richard Manning Jefferies
