= 1944 United States Senate election in South Carolina =

1944 Democratic Senate primary election in South Carolina
- July 25, 1944
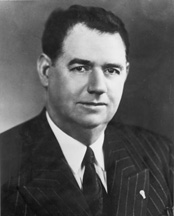

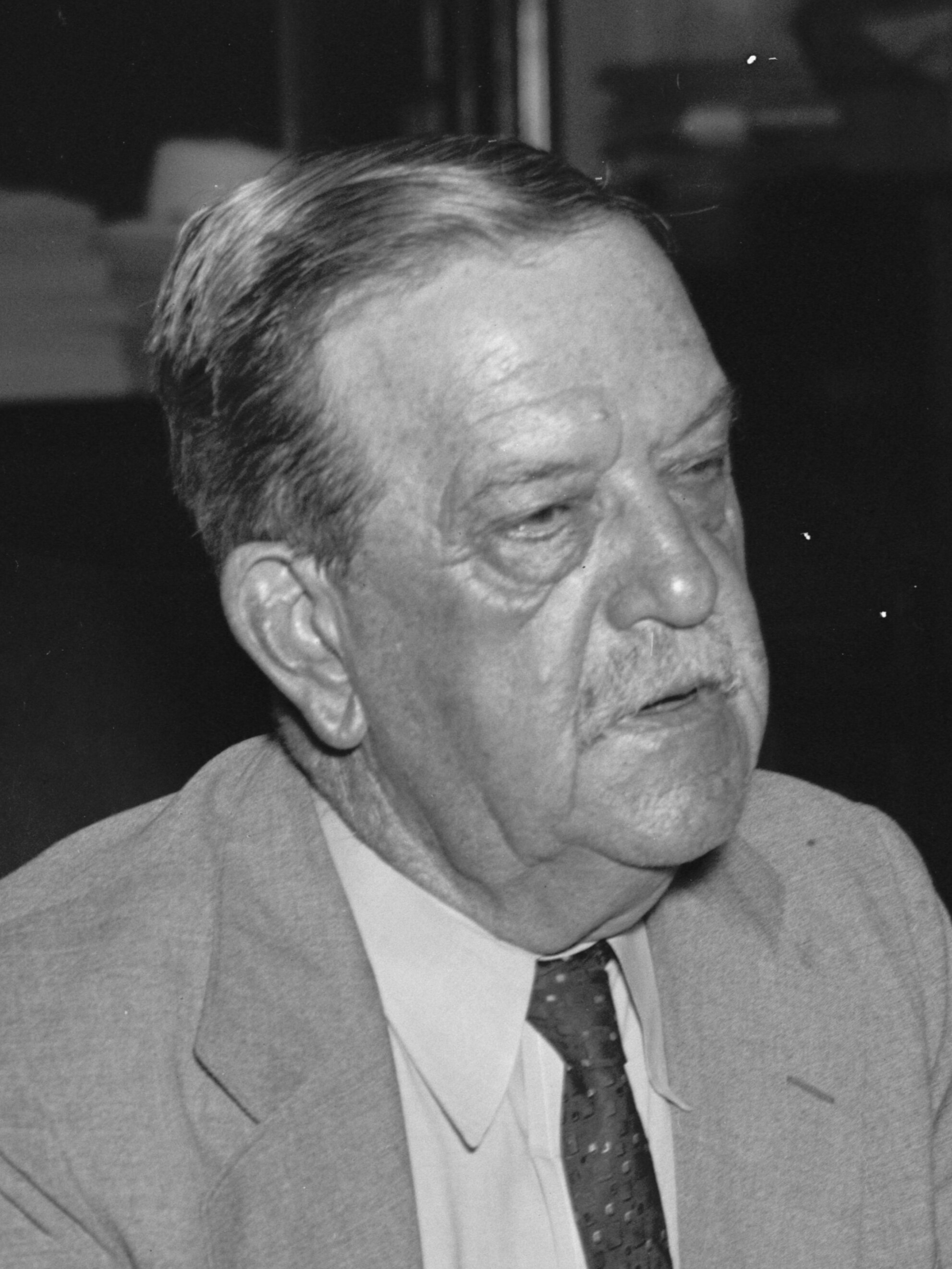
Nominee	Olin D. Johnston	Ellison D. Smith
Party	Democratic	Democratic
Popular vote	138,440	88,085
Percentage	55.20%	35.12%
- County results Johnston: 30–40% 40–50% 50–60% 60–70% 70–80% Smith: 30–40% 50–60%
U.S. senator before election
Ellison D. Smith
Democratic
Elected U.S. Senator
Olin D. Johnston
Democratic

The 1944 South Carolina United States Senate election was held on November 7, 1944, to select the U.S. Senator from the state of South Carolina.

On July 25, Governor Olin Johnston defeated incumbent senator Ellison "Cotton Ed" Smith in the Democratic primary with 55.2% of the vote.

At this time, South Carolina was a one-party state, and the Democratic nomination was tantamount to victory. Johnston won the November general election with only token opposition from Republican James B. Gaston. A victory by Johnston was never in doubt.

== Democratic primary ==
By 1944, Ellison D. Smith had served 35 years in the Senate and was approaching his 80th birthday. He was an ardent foe of the New Deal in the Senate and opposed almost every policy of President Roosevelt. His opponent in the previous Senate election was Governor Olin D. Johnston, who challenged him once again in the Democratic primary. While Johnston was fully supportive of the New Deal in 1938, he had moderated his enthusiasm towards Roosevelt's domestic policies in 1944. Johnston instead would put a great deal of focus into praising Roosevelt's popular foreign policy which was succeeding in bringing the United States closer to victory in World War II.

Smith had campaigned over the years on a two plank platform: keep the negroes down and the price of cotton up. Yet Johnston was able to seize the mantle of white supremacy from Smith in 1944. The Supreme Court had decided early in the year in the case Smith v. Allwright that primary elections must be open to all, regardless of race. Johnston, as governor, had called the General Assembly into session to make the South Carolina Democratic Party a private club so that it could restrict its primaries to white voters. Thus on the campaign trail Johnston was able to prove to the voters that he had acted during a time of crisis to save the Democratic primary from the blacks. Furthermore, Johnston's youthful appearance contrasted sharply with Smith's aged and tired persona. The voters were shocked when Smith failed to deliver a full speech during one debate with Johnston and instead played a recording of a speech he had made six years prior.

Democratic Primary
Candidate	Votes	%
Olin D. Johnston	138,440	55.2
Ellison D. Smith	88,085	35.1
John M. Daniel	14,572	5.8
Carl B. Epps	6,861	2.7
A.S. Merrimon	2,858	1.2

== General election campaign ==
Winning the Democratic primary was tantamount to winning the general election, so Johnston was virtually assured of becoming the next senator from South Carolina. The South Carolina Republican Party was controlled by the white faction and they nominated James B. Gaston as their candidate. The Tolbert black and tan faction was rebuffed by the national Republican Party, but they proceeded to nominate B.L. Hendrix for the election. Many of the black civil rights leaders of the state decided to form their own political party in response to the state Democratic party becoming a private entity. Their party, called the Progressive Democratic Party, nominated Osceola E. McKaine for the Senate election with the sole purpose of motivating blacks in the state to register and vote.

== General election results ==
General election results by county Johnston: 70–80% 80–90% >90%

South Carolina U.S. Senate Election, 1944
Party	Candidate	Votes	%	±%
Democratic	Olin D. Johnston	94,556	92.94%	−5.95%
Republican	James B. Gaston	3,807	3.74%	+2.63%
Progressive Democratic	Osceola E. McKaine	3,214	3.16%	N/A
Republican (Tolbert)	B.L. Hendrix	141	0.14%	N/A
No party	Write-Ins	18	0.02%	N/A
Majority		90,749	89.20%	−8.58%
Turnout		101,736		
Democratic hold				

== See also ==
- List of United States senators from South Carolina
- United States Senate elections, 1944
- United States House of Representatives elections in South Carolina, 1944
