= Thomas Bothwell Butler =

72nd lieutenant governor of South Carolina

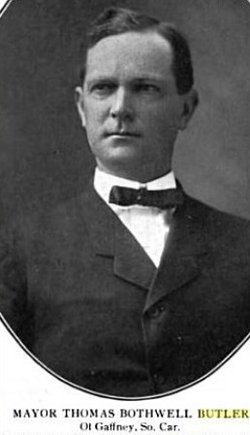

72nd Lieutenant Governor of South Carolina
- In office January 18, 1927 – January 5, 1931
- Governor: John Gardiner Richards Jr.
- Preceded by: E. B. Jackson
- Succeeded by: James O. Sheppard

Member of the South Carolina House of Representatives
- In office 1901–1902

Member of the South Carolina Senate
- In office 1903–1907
- In office 1919–1926

Personal details
- Born: January 11, 1866 Union County, South Carolina
- Died: January 5, 1931 (aged 64) Union County, South Carolina
- Party: Democratic
- Spouse: Spouse Annie Wood
- Children: 1
- Relatives: Thomas Bothwell Jeter (uncle)
- Education: South Carolina College, (LLB)
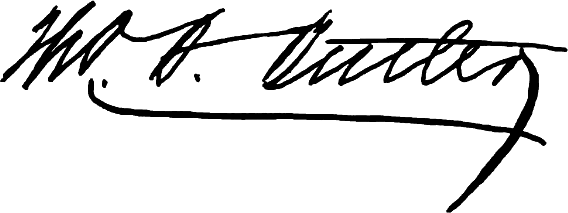
- Signature

Thomas Bothwell Butler (January 11, 1866 – January 5, 1931) was an American lawyer and politician who served as the 72nd lieutenant governor of South Carolina. He died in office on January 5, 1931.

== Life and career ==
Butler was born in Union, South Carolina. After earning a law degree from South Carolina College (later the University of South Carolina, he opened his own law practice. He later served as the mayor of Gaffney, South Carolina, and in 1901, Butler was elected one term to the South Carolina House of Representatives, serving until 1902. He served six terms in the South Carolina Senate from Cherokee County. He was elected to the South Carolina Senate in two separate time periods, from 1903 to 1907 and from 1919 to 1926, when he was elected to the South Carolina lieutenant governorship, serving under Governor John Gardiner Richards Jr.

== Personal life and death ==
Butler was the nephew of Thomas Bothwell Jeter, who served as the 79th Governor of South Carolina.

Butler died in January 1931, at the age of 64.
