= Richard Manning Jefferies =

American politician

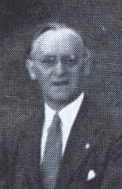

101st Governor of South Carolina
- In office March 2, 1942 – January 19, 1943
- Lieutenant: Vacant
- Preceded by: Joseph Emile Harley
- Succeeded by: Olin D. Johnston

President Pro Tempore of the South Carolina Senate
- In office January 14, 1941 – March 2, 1942
- Governor: Burnet R. Maybank; Joseph Emile Harley
- Preceded by: John Mahon Wise
- Succeeded by: John Mahon Wise

Member of the South Carolina Senate from Colleton County
- In office January 12, 1943 – January 13, 1959
- Preceded by: Himself
- Succeeded by: Ivey Andrew Smoak, Jr.
- In office January 11, 1927 – March 2, 1942
- Preceded by: James Graham Padgett
- Succeeded by: Himself

Personal details
- Born: Richard Manning Jefferies; February 27, 1889 Union County, South Carolina, US
- Died: April 20, 1964 (aged 75) Charleston, South Carolina, US
- Party: Democratic Party
- Spouse: Ann K. Savage
- Children: 3
- Education: University of South Carolina
- Profession: Lawyer, politician
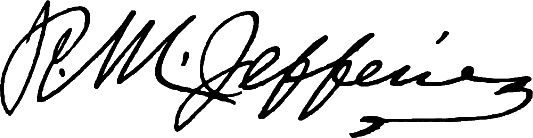
- Signature

Richard Manning Jefferies (February 27, 1889 – April 20, 1964), a longtime state legislator and the 101st governor of South Carolina from 1942 to 1943, was born in Union County (later Cherokee County), South Carolina on February 27, 1889. He graduated from the University of South Carolina in 1910 and moved to the town of Ridgeland. There, he read law and served as superintendent of the elementary school. Moving to Walterboro after his admission to the bar, he practiced law and was elected probate judge of Colleton County in 1918.

== Political career ==
In 1926, he was elected to his first term in the South Carolina State Senate. In the senate, he became associated with a group of like-minded legislators, largely from the rural South Carolina lowcountry, that was known as the "Barnwell Ring". Due to their legislative seniority, these fiscal conservatives held most of the political power in South Carolina from the 1930s to the 1960s. Jefferies was in his fourth four-year term in the senate in 1941 when he was elected chair of the powerful finance committee and president pro tempore of the senate. In that position, he was second in line for the governorship. When Governor Burnet R. Maybank resigned in November 1941 to serve in the United States Senate, Lieutenant Governor J. Emile Harley succeeded to the office. Harley, suffering from throat cancer, died less than three months later, and Jefferies succeeded him as governor on March 2, 1942.

Jefferies worked to secure wartime defense contracts for the state and fought attempts to raid the state's agricultural labor supply from out of state labor recruiters. He promoted industrial development, and appointed a study commission to recommend ways to transition the state from a wartime to a peacetime economy at the end of the war. He was not a candidate for election to a full term as governor in 1942, instead choosing to run for his old seat in the state senate. He was succeeded by Olin D. Johnston. He won that election, and served 16 more years in the senate. However, his loss of seniority due to his 11 months as governor meant that he did not regain his positions of power. Instead, he became active as an executive at Santee Cooper, the state's public power generating corporation. He remained at the helm of Santee Cooper until his death on April 20, 1964.

Political offices
| Preceded by Joseph Emile Harley | Governor of South Carolina; 1942–1943 | Succeeded by Olin D. Johnston |
