= 1942 South Carolina gubernatorial election =

1942 South Carolina Democratic gubernatorial primary
- August 25, 1942
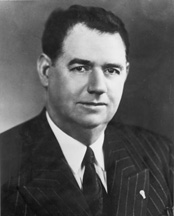

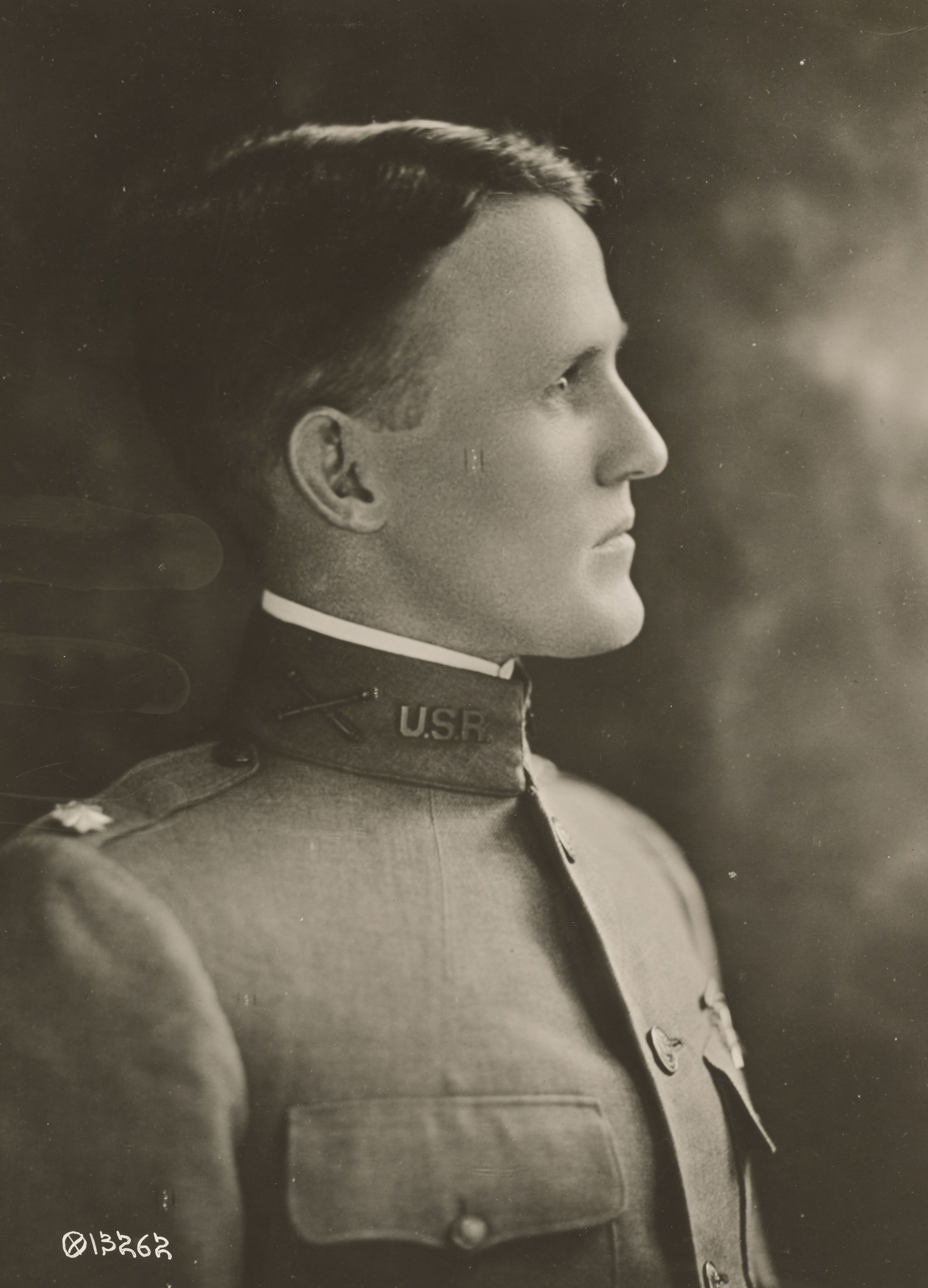
Nominee	Olin Johnston	Wyndham Manning
Party	Democratic	Democratic
Popular vote	121,465	113,014
Percentage	51.80%	48.20%
- County results Johnston: 50–60% 60–70% Manning: 50–60% 60–70% 70–80% 80–90%
Governor before election
Burnet R. Maybank
Democratic
Elected Governor
Olin D. Johnston
Democratic

The 1942 South Carolina gubernatorial election was held on November 3, 1942, during World War II, to select the Governor of South Carolina. Olin D. Johnston won the Democratic primary and ran without opposition in the general election on account of South Carolina's effective status as a one-party state, winning a second non-consecutive term as Governor of South Carolina.

== Democratic primary ==
=== Candidates ===
- Olin D. Johnston, former Governor of South Carolina
- Wyndham Meredith Manning, former State Representative from Stateburg and candidate for Governor in 1934 and 1938

The South Carolina Democratic Party held their primary for governor in the summer of 1942. The race was between former Governor Olin D. Johnston and Wyndham Meredith Manning, the third attempt for both candidates. Olin Johnston emerged victorious in a tight race and effectively became the next governor of South Carolina because there was no opposition in the general election.

=== Results ===
Democratic Primary
Candidate	Votes	%
Olin D. Johnston	121,465	51.8
Wyndham Meredith Manning	113,014	48.2

== General election ==
The general election was held on November 3, 1942 and Olin D. Johnston was elected the next governor of South Carolina without opposition. Being a non-presidential election and few contested races, turnout was much lower than the Democratic primary election.

South Carolina Gubernatorial Election, 1942
Party	Candidate	Votes	%	±%
Democratic	Olin D. Johnston	23,859	100.00	+0.6
Majority		23,859	100.00	+1.2
Turnout		23,859		
Democratic hold				

65+% won by Johnston

== See also ==
- Governor of South Carolina
- List of governors of South Carolina
- South Carolina gubernatorial elections

Preceded by 1938	South Carolina gubernatorial elections	Succeeded by 1946
