= John Henry McCray =

American journalist (1910–1987)

- Born: August 25, 1910; Youngstown, Florida, U.S.
- Died: September 15, 1987 (aged 77); Sylacauga, Alabama, U.S.
- Burial place: Oak Hill Cemetery, Talladega, Alabama, U.S.
- Education: Talladega College
- Known for: journalism, politician, newspaper publisher, newspaper editor, civil rights activist, college academic administrator

John Henry McCray (1910–1987) was an American journalist, newspaper publisher, politician, civil rights activist, and college academic administrator. An African American, he worked at some of the country's most prominent Black newspapers including the Lighthouse and Informer newspaper of South Carolina (from 1941 to 1954); the Charleston Messenger; the Pittsburgh Courier as the Carolina editor (from 1960 to 1962); the Baltimore Afro-American (from 1954 to 1960); The Chicago Defender (from 1962 to 1963); and the Atlanta Daily World (from February to September 1964). McCray was a co-founder of the Progressive Democratic Party (PDP) of South Carolina.

== Early life and education ==
John Henry McCray was born on August 25, 1910, in Youngstown, Florida, to parents Rachel Rebecca Montgomery and Donald Carlos McCray. He grew up in Lincolnville, near Charleston.

He attended high school at Avery Institute (or Avery Normal Institute) in Charleston, where he was valedictorian. He earned his B.S. degree in chemistry in 1935 at Talladega College.

== Career ==
He started his career at North Carolina Mutual Life Insurance Company, the largest Black-owned life insurance company. From 1935 to 1938, he was working as a city editor of the Charleston Messenger. From 1939 to 1941, he stated his own newspaper Charleston Lighthouse (later known as Carolina Lighthouse), followed by taking over Reverend E. A. Parker's People's Informer.

On December 7, 1941, McCray published the first edition of the Black weekly newspaper, Lighthouse and Informer. The Lighthouse and Informer, was a progressive publication which called for racial equality, and rejected any racial accommodation, and incrementalism. The articles covered many aspect of Black life and columns. The last publication of the Lighthouse and Informer was June 12, 1954.

In 1950, McCray charged with criminal libel for writing an article in which he suggested that Willie Tolbert, a black man who had recently been executed in South Carolina for raping a 16-year-old white girl, was innocent and the girl had consented to sex with Tolbert. In 1951, he was found guilty and sentenced to three years of probation plus a $3000 fine. In 1951, he was arrested for violating the terms of his probation and served one month on a chain gang.

In 1944, he was cofounder of the Progressive Democratic Party (PDP) of South Carolina. The PDP was the first Black Democratic Party in the Southern United States.

In September 1964, McCray become director of public relations at his alma mater, Talladega College, where he eventually retired from in 1981, then as the director of recruitment and admissions.

== Death and legacy ==
McCray died on September 15, 1987, in Sylacauga, Alabama.

The library at the University of South Carolina holds the John Henry McCray Papers. McCray is part of a mural, The Pursuit of Opportunity: Celebrating African American Business, by artist Ija Charles, located at 1401 Main Street in Columbia, South Carolina. Additionally there is a historical marker located in Columbia, dedicated to McCray and the Lighthouse and Informer.

McCray is included in Sid Bedingfield's book, Newspaper Wars: Civil Rights and White Resistance in South Carolina, 1935–1965 (published in 2017).

In 2020, the National Park Service gave a three-year grant to Allen University located in Columbia to study McCray.
