= John Gardiner Richards Jr. =

96th Governor of South Carolina

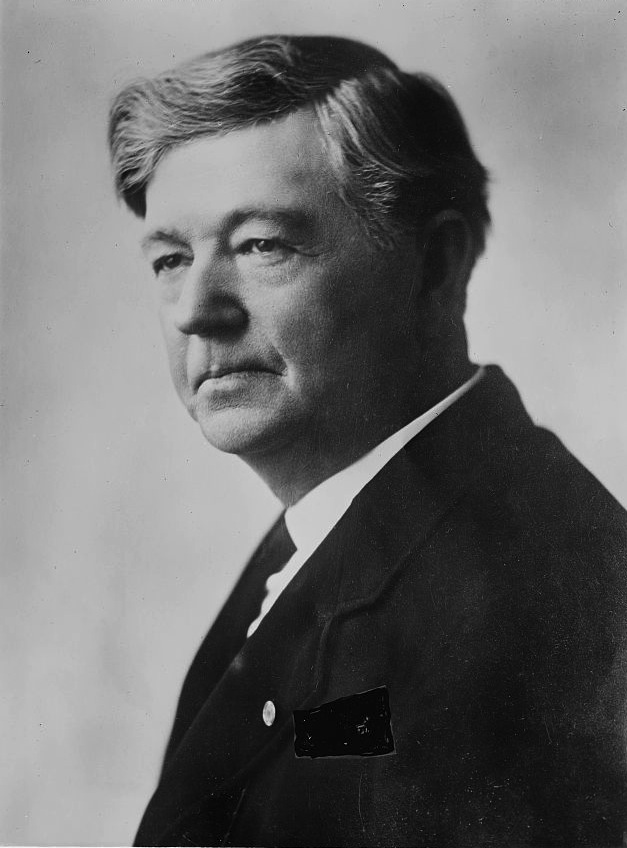

96th Governor of South Carolina
- In office January 18, 1927 – January 20, 1931
- Lieutenant: Thomas Bothwell Butler
- Preceded by: Thomas Gordon McLeod
- Succeeded by: Ibra Charles Blackwood

Member of the South Carolina House of Representatives from Kershaw County
- In office January 10, 1899 – January 10, 1911

Personal details
- Born: September 11, 1864 Liberty Hill, South Carolina
- Died: October 9, 1941 (aged 77) Liberty Hill, South Carolina, U.S.

John Gardiner Richards Jr. (September 11, 1864 – October 9, 1941) was the 96th governor of South Carolina from 1927 to 1931.

== Biography ==
He was born in Liberty Hill, South Carolina, on September 11, 1864, to John G. Richards and Sophia Edwards Smith.

He attended schools in Liberty Hill and North Carolina's Bingham Military Institute for a short time.

In 1898, he was elected to the South Carolina House of Representatives.

In 1910, he was appointed as the South Carolina Railroad Commissioner.

Earlier in his political career, Richards was a follower of Benjamin Tillman, but in later years became a follower of Cole L. Blease.

The South Carolina Constitution had been amended in 1926 to give the governor a four-year term, and Richards became the first South Carolina governor elected for a four-year term. His time as governor was noted for his strict observance of Blue laws, even chastising golfers for playing on Sunday. An Act was also passed during his tenure that provided for the installation of sewerage systems in company housing by textile manufacturers. His tenure has been criticized by his arguably negative handling of labor issues.

He died on October 9, 1941, in Liberty Hill, South Carolina.

Party political offices
Preceded by Thomas Gordon McLeod	Democratic nominee for Governor of South Carolina; 1926	Succeeded by Ibra Charles Blackwood
Political offices
Preceded by Thomas Gordon McLeod	Governor of South Carolina; 1927–1931	Succeeded by Ibra Charles Blackwood
