= Progressive Democratic Party (South Carolina) =

- Chairperson: John Henry McCray
- Founded: 1944; 82 years ago
- Dissolved: 1948; 78 years ago
- Ideology: Progressivism
- Political position: Center-left
- Colors: Blue

The Progressive Democratic Party was a political party in South Carolina in the 1940s. It was founded in 1944 by John Henry McCray, editor of the black newspaper The Lighthouse and Informer to galvanize blacks to register and vote. While it did not achieve electoral success, it did successfully get blacks to play an increasingly important role in South Carolina politics.

== Origin ==
From the end of Reconstruction in 1877 to the 1960s, the Democratic Party was the only viable political party in South Carolina. It was essential for any politician seeking to hold a public office that they win the Democratic primary. The general election was predecided, because the South Carolina Republican Party never seriously contested an election and was little more than a patronage institution. The party was also increasingly hostile to blacks in the state, because the national Republican Party recognized the lily white faction, which sought to exclude blacks, as opposed to the Tolbert black and tan faction. More importantly, though, were the New Deal policies initiated by President Franklin D. Roosevelt, which had the effect of convincing blacks to switch their allegiance from the Republican Party to the Democratic Party. Therefore, blacks sought participation in the Democratic primaries, but were excluded in the Southern United States because of their race.

In April 1944, the Supreme Court ruled in the case Smith v. Allwright that white primaries were illegal. In response, Governor Olin D. Johnston called the General Assembly into session to convert the South Carolina Democratic Party into a private club so that it could exclude blacks from its primaries. John Henry McCray then led an effort for blacks to form their own Democratic party to show their support for President Roosevelt and to contest the validity of the white Democratic party. They originally called their party the South Carolina Colored Democratic Party, but at a convention in Columbia on May 24 the party was formally established as the Progressive Democratic Party (PDP). The term colored was omitted from the name because their goal was racial inclusion and they did not want the appearance of an exclusively black party. A story was later concocted by McCray that the name was changed because an elderly white liberal woman wanted to join the party.

== The PDP ==
At the party's convention, they selected a slate of eighteen delegates for the Democratic convention, adopted a ten point platform, and nominated Osceola E. McKaine for the Senate election. The PDP delegates tried to unseat the white South Carolina delegates at the national convention, but the executive committee refused to go along with the scheme. The platform of the PDP included several civil rights issues such as the elimination of the poll tax, a prohibition of racial discrimination in hiring practices, and anti lynching laws. It also included a provision to support the American effort in World War II and the election of President Roosevelt to a fourth term. Osceola McKaine only officially garnered 3,200 votes in the Senate election, but the PDP charged that many of his votes were not counted and estimated that he had over 10,000 votes.

From the beginning, the party and the NAACP worked hand in hand and were practically the same organization. The difference was that the NAACP handled all matters relating to litigation and the PDP was in charge of political action. Together they achieved a dramatic amount of success by increasing the number of registered voters in the state in the 1940s from 3,500 to 50,000. It was through their efforts that the black voters provided the margin that Olin D. Johnston needed to beat Strom Thurmond in the 1950 Senate election.

In 1948, the party ceased functioning as a party and instead operated as a political action group. The PDP was urged by Thurgood Marshall among others to drop "Party" from their name so that the white party leaders would be unable to claim that they were discriminating in the same manner as the PDP. Thus when the Supreme Court ruled in Brown v. Baskin that the Democratic Party had to allow blacks into the party, the Progressive Democrats operated within the Democratic Party to achieve greater rights for blacks.

By 1958 the organization had become formally known as the Progressive Democratic Caucus, and McCray, despite his frequent absences from the state, claimed that the Caucus had helped carry South Carolina for John F. Kennedy's 1960 campaign. The caucus formally dissolved by 1964.

== See also ==
- Mississippi Freedom Democratic Party, a similar multi-racial Democratic party in Mississippi
- National Democratic Party of Alabama, a similar multi-racial Democratic party in Alabama
