= 1950 United States Senate election in South Carolina =

1950 Democratic Senate primary election in South Carolina
- July 11, 1950
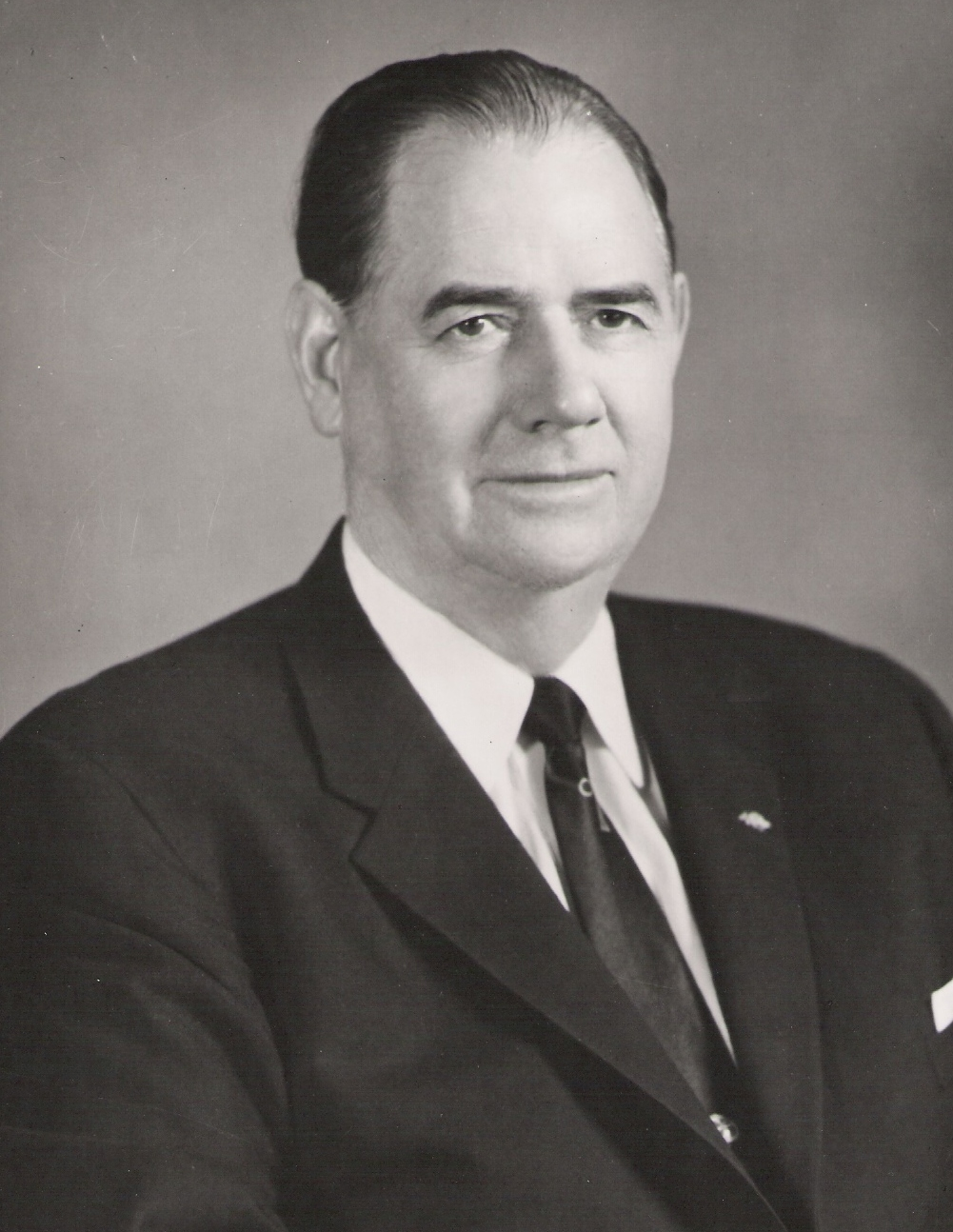

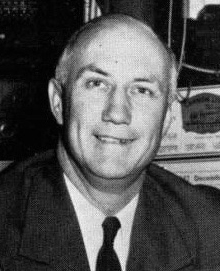
Nominee	Olin D. Johnston	Strom Thurmond
Party	Democratic	Democratic
Popular vote	186,180	158,904
Percentage	53.95%	46.05%
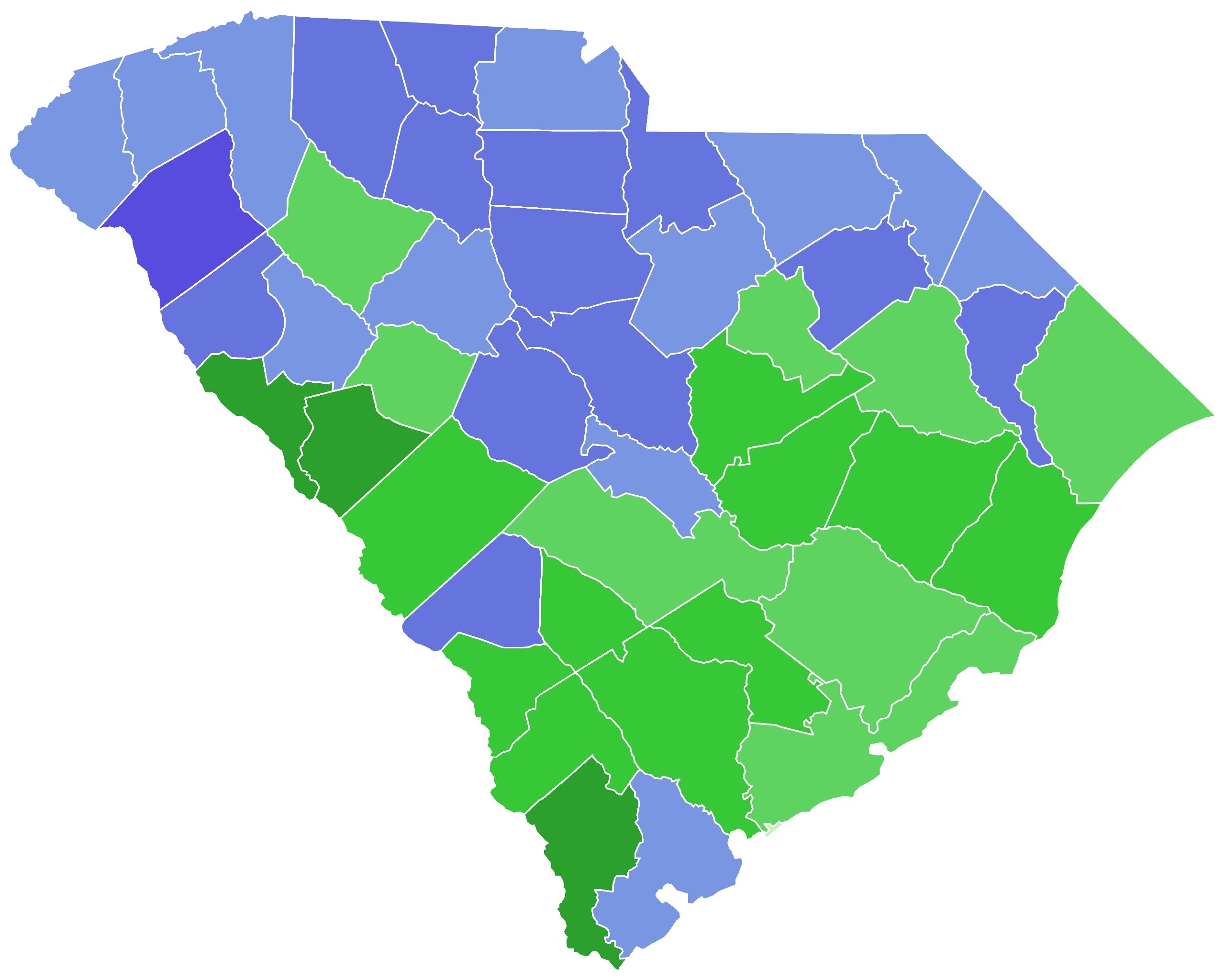
- County results Johnston: 50–60% 60–70% 70–80% Thurmond: 50–60% 60–70% 70–80%
U.S. senator before election
Olin D. Johnston
Democratic
Elected U.S. Senator
Olin D. Johnston
Democratic

The 1950 South Carolina United States Senate election was held on November 7, 1950, to select the U.S. Senator from the state of South Carolina. Incumbent Democratic Senator Olin D. Johnston defeated Strom Thurmond in a bitterly contested Democratic primary on July 11 and was unopposed in the general election.

== Democratic primary ==
=== Candidates ===
- Olin D. Johnston, incumbent Senator
- Strom Thurmond, incumbent Governor of South Carolina and 1948 presidential candidate

=== Campaign ===
Strom Thurmond entered the Democratic primary hoping to parlay his momentum from the 1948 presidential campaign into a victory against incumbent Senator Olin D. Johnston. The move was highly controversial because Thurmond had promised to never run against Johnston if he pledged his support for his gubernatorial campaign in 1946, which Johnston did. The men represented two vastly different segments of the electorate in South Carolina, the textile workers of the Upstate supported Johnston and the aristocracy backed Thurmond. The passions both sides felt for their respective candidates led to the race being billed as the "Campaign of the Century."

The campaign began on May 23 in Lexington and Thurmond attacked Johnston for being soft on segregation and too close to the administration of President Truman. At a campaign stop for the Democratic candidates in Newberry on June 26, Thurmond accused Johnston of being "silent as a tomb" when Truman ordered the integration of the military and called out Johnston to stand up and deny it. Johnston stood up and yelled back at Thurmond that he was a liar to which chaos ensued. Thurmond challenged Johnston to a fight and after the meeting as Johnston went to shake Thurmond's hand, Thurmond grabbed Johnston's arm and swung him around. A fight between the two men was only prevented due to the timely intervention of campaign aides and supporters.

Throughout the campaign, Thurmond painted Johnston as a Southern liberal senator similar to Senators Frank Porter Graham of North Carolina and Claude Pepper of Florida, both of whom were defeated in their primaries. Johnston responded that he was a key player in a bloc of Southern senators led by Richard Russell of Georgia in defeating civil rights bills. Furthermore, Johnston attacked Thurmond for having appointed T.C. McFall, a black doctor, to the state medical advisory board while Governor of South Carolina. McFall was the first black appointed to a state position since Reconstruction and Johnston accused Thurmond of making the appointment to capture the black vote. In Charleston at College Park, Johnston declared to the crowd that he "would never have appointed the nigger physician of Charleston, Dr. T.C. McFall, to displace your beloved white physician of this community." A chorus of boos rang out from the blacks in attendance and Johnston shouted "Make those niggers keep quiet!"

Thurmond attacked Johnston's record as governor claiming that he had released 3,221 criminals from prison and stated that "it was easier to get out of the penitentiary than it was to get in it." Johnston referred to state statistics that showed he had only pardoned, paroled, or commuted the sentences of 671 criminals. Furthermore, he said that some of the men he had released were named honorary colonels by Thurmond. This charge was given credence because Thurmond refused to make public his list of honorary colonels.

One policy in which the two candidates did disagree on was federal aid to education. While governor, Thurmond had been supportive of assistance from the federal government, but he reversed his position because he feared that the federal government would eventually force integration upon the states. Johnston countered that the state universities received federal funds, but remained segregated and that the state desperately needed assistance because its teachers were grossly underpaid.

The South Carolina Democratic Party held the primary on July 11 and Johnston emerged as the clear winner. It was estimated that approximately 50,000 blacks voted in the election and they overwhelmingly cast their ballot for Johnston. While the blacks were repulsed by both men's positions on civil rights, they gave their support to Johnston because he had a progressive record and they wanted to penalize Thurmond for his 1948 presidential campaign.

=== Results ===
Democratic primary
Candidate	Votes	%
Olin D. Johnston	186,180	54.0
Strom Thurmond	158,904	46.0

== General election ==
=== Results ===
1950 South Carolina U.S. Senate election
Party	Candidate	Votes	%	±%
Democratic	Olin D. Johnston (incumbent)	50,458	99.93%	+6.99%
No party	Write-Ins	37	0.07%	N/A
Majority		50,421	99.85%	+10.65%
Turnout		50,495		
Democratic hold				

65+% won by Johnston

== See also ==
- List of United States senators from South Carolina
- 1950 United States Senate elections
- 1950 United States House of Representatives elections in South Carolina
- 1950 South Carolina gubernatorial election

== Bibliography ==
- Bass, Jack; Marilyn W. Thompson (2005). Strom: The Complicated Personal and Political Life of Strom Thurmond. PublicAffairs. pp. 123–135.
- Jordan, Frank E. The Primary State: A History of the Democratic Party in South Carolina, 1876-1962. p. 80.
- "Supplemental Report of the Secretary of State to the General Assembly of South Carolina." Reports and Resolutions of South Carolina to the General Assembly of the State of South Carolina. Columbia, SC: 1951, p. 7.
- "Fielder's Choice". Time. July 24, 1950. Archived from the original on April 23, 2008.
- "Political Caravan". Time. July 24, 1950. Archived from the original on October 23, 2012.
