= Ibra Charles Blackwood =

American politician

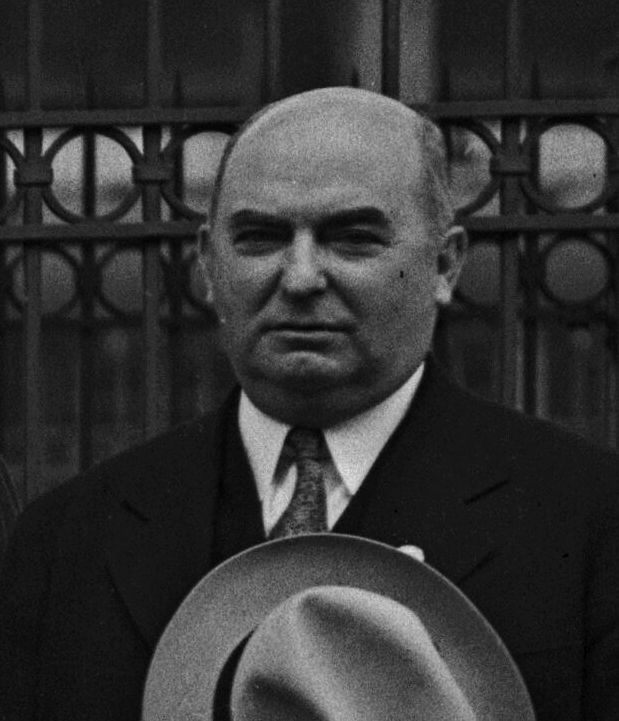

97th Governor of South Carolina
- In office January 20, 1931 – January 15, 1935
- Lieutenant: James Sheppard
- Preceded by: John Gardiner Richards, Jr.
- Succeeded by: Olin D. Johnston

Member of the South Carolina House of Representatives from Spartanburg County
- In office January 13, 1903 – January 10, 1905

Personal details
- Born: Ibra Charles Blackwood; November 21, 1878 Spartanburg County, South Carolina
- Died: February 12, 1936 (aged 57) Spartanburg, South Carolina
- Party: Democratic
- Spouse: Margaret Hodges
- Education: Wofford College

Ibra Charles Blackwood (November 21, 1878 – February 12, 1936) was the 97th governor of South Carolina from 1931 to 1935.

== Biography ==
Born in the New Prospect community in rural Spartanburg County, South Carolina, Blackwood studied at Furman University preparatory school and obtained his law degree from Wofford College. During this time he became a brother of Pi Kappa Alpha. He then began to practice law in Spartanburg.

At the age of 24, Blackwood was elected to the South Carolina House of Representatives in 1902. From 1914 to 1916, Blackwood served as a tax collector for the Internal Revenue Service after which he became the solicitor for the Seventh Judicial Circuit of South Carolina.

Blackwood won a contested Democratic primary in 1930 to become the 97th governor of South Carolina. His term as governor was noted for the creation of the South Carolina Public Service Authority in 1934 which provided for a hydroelectric plant at Pinopolis Dam and the construction of numerous dams on the Santee and Cooper Rivers. A major strike in 1934 by the majority of textile workers in the state forced Governor Blackwood to call up the South Carolina National Guard. However, the strike was so severe that the Governor had to commission "constables without compensation" and 6 strikers were killed by these special deputies in Honea Path on September 6.

Blackwood resumed the practice of law in Spartanburg upon leaving the governorship in 1935. He died almost a year later on February 12, 1936, and is buried in Greenlawn Memorial Gardens in Spartanburg.

Party political offices
Preceded by John Gardiner Richards Jr.	Democratic nominee for Governor of South Carolina; 1930	Succeeded by Olin D. Johnston
Political offices
Preceded by John Gardiner Richards, Jr.	Governor of South Carolina; 1931–1935	Succeeded by Olin D. Johnston
