= Olin D. Johnston =

American politician (1896–1965)

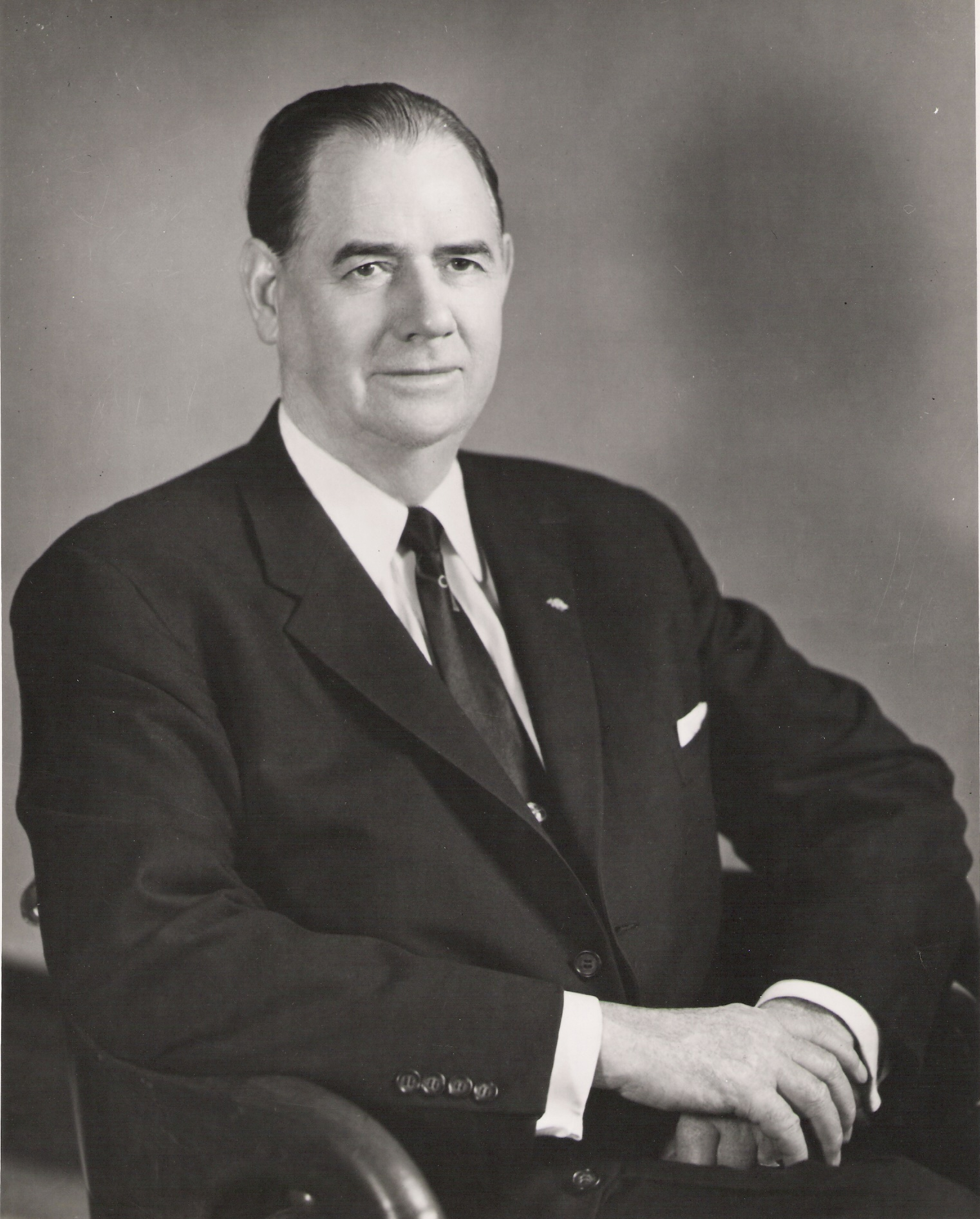

United States Senator from South Carolina
- In office January 3, 1945 – April 18, 1965
- Preceded by: Wilton E. Hall
- Succeeded by: Donald S. Russell

98th Governor of South Carolina
- In office January 19, 1943 – January 2, 1945
- Lieutenant: Ransome J. Williams
- Preceded by: Richard M. Jefferies
- Succeeded by: Ransome J. Williams
- In office January 15, 1935 – January 17, 1939
- Lieutenant: Joseph E. Harley
- Preceded by: Ibra C. Blackwood
- Succeeded by: Burnet R. Maybank

Member of the South Carolina House of Representatives from Spartanburg County
- In office January 11, 1927 – January 13, 1931

Member of the South Carolina House of Representatives from Anderson County
- In office January 9, 1923 – January 13, 1925

Personal details
- Born: Olin DeWitt Talmadge Johnston; November 18, 1896 Near Honea Path, South Carolina, U.S.
- Died: April 18, 1965 (aged 68) Columbia, South Carolina, U.S.
- Party: Democratic
- Spouse: Gladys Atkinson (m. 1924)
- Children: 3, including Elizabeth
- Education: Wofford College (BA); University of South Carolina (M.A., LL.B.)
- Profession: Lawyer

Military service
- Allegiance: United States of America
- Branch/service: United States Army National Guard
- Years of service: 1917 – 1919
- Rank: Sergeant
- Unit: 117th Engineer Unit
- Battles/wars: World War I

Olin DeWitt Talmadge Johnston (November 9, 1896 – April 18, 1965) was an American politician. He is from the US state of South Carolina. He served as the 98th governor of South Carolina, from 1935 to 1939 and again from 1943 to 1945. He represented the state in the United States Senate from 1945 until his death from pneumonia in Columbia, South Carolina in 1965. In 1944, he denied clemency to George Stinney, a 14 year-old African American boy who was wrongfully sentenced to death in 1944 after a trial that lasted for one single day. Stinney's conviction was overturned 70 years later.

== Early life ==
Johnston was born near Honea Path, South Carolina in Anderson County. His family maintained a farm and worked in the Chiquola Manufacturing Company's textile mill. Johnston's youth was divided between schooling, work on the farm, and work in the mill. He could attend school only while the family was on the farm, usually in the summer. Johnston eventually enrolled in the Textile Industrial Institute, now Spartanburg Methodist College, in Spartanburg and here Johnston earned his high school diploma in thirteen months, graduating in 1915. He entered Wofford College in the fall of 1915, where he worked his way through school by holding a variety of jobs, but his studies were interrupted by service in the United States Army during World War I.

== Military involvement ==
Johnston enlisted in the Army National Guard in 1917 and served with the 117th Engineer unit, which was attached to the 42nd Division, the Rainbow Division, in France. He served eighteen months overseas and attained the rank of sergeant. Following his discharge in June 1919, he returned to Wofford where he received his bachelor's degree in 1921. In the fall of 1921, Johnston entered the University of South Carolina where he earned both an M.A. in Political Science in 1923 and an LL.B. in 1924. That same year established the law firm of Faucette and Johnston in Spartanburg, and in December, married Gladys Atkinson of Spartanburg. She would serve throughout his career as his most trusted counselor.

== Politics ==
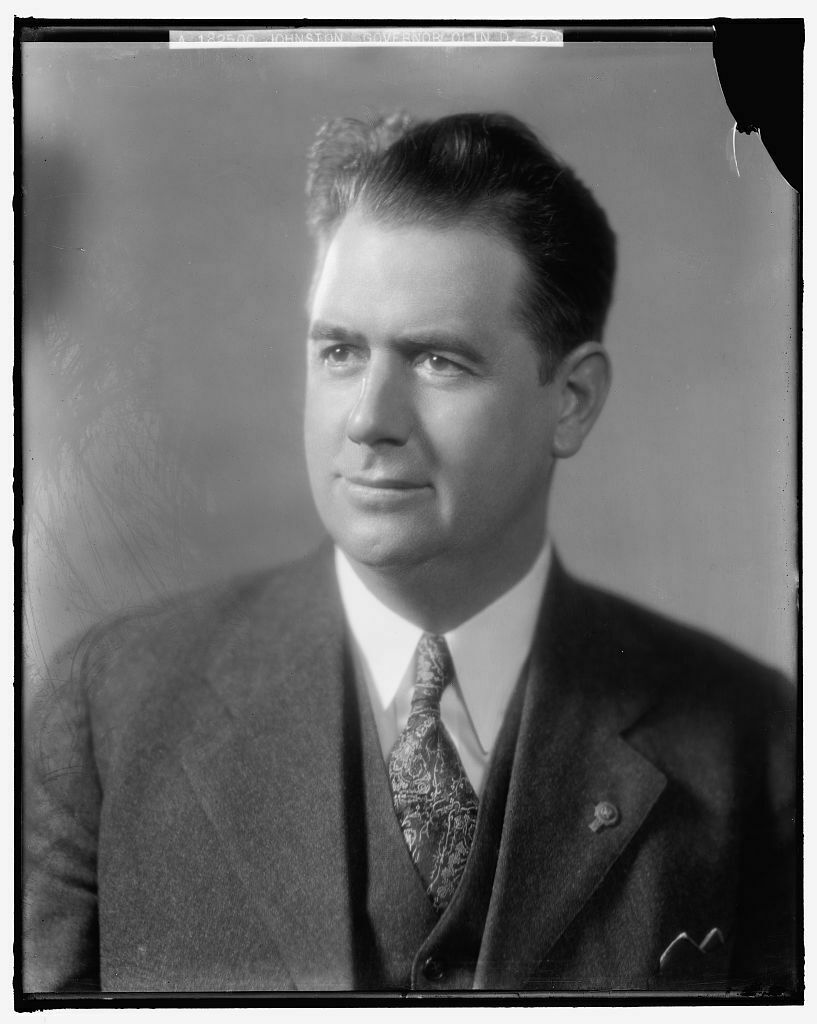
Johnston as governor.

In 1922, while still attending college, Johnston was elected to the South Carolina House of Representatives as a Democrat and represented Anderson County for one term before he stepped down in 1924 to run his law practice. He was elected to the same body in 1927 as a representative from Spartanburg County and served for two terms. Johnston proved a capable and popular campaigner. As a young legislator, Johnston was an advocate of the state's textile mill workers, and his major accomplishment was shepherding a law that required mill owners to install sewers in mill villages.

Johnston made his first campaign for governor in 1930, and led the slate of candidates in the primary, but lost by around 1,000 votes in the runoff election. Undeterred by the loss, he ran again and was elected Governor of South Carolina in 1934, serving for one term. In his inaugural address of 1935, Johnston stated--"This occasion marks the end of what is commonly known as 'ring rule' in South Carolina." Among his achievements as governor were the repeal of the state's personal property tax; the initiation in South Carolina of the country's first rural electrification program, a pilot program personally authorized by President Roosevelt; the $3.00 license plate; and the establishment of the Industrial Commission, Labor Department, Planning and Development Board, and Ports Authority.

=== Governor of South Carolina ===
On taking office, Johnston proposed a series of bills to aid the state's textile workers. An ardent New Dealer, he managed to push his legislative program through the state house of representatives only to meet defeat in the Lowcountry-dominated state senate. In what has become the most famous fight between a governor and legislature in South Carolina history, Johnston tried to dismiss a number of members of the powerful State Highway Commission. After the commissioners refused to leave their posts, Johnston mobilized the National Guard to occupy the offices of the Highway Department. Ultimately, he lost his battle with the Highway Commission, and severely wounded his already poor relationship with the legislature. Johnston lost his power to name highway commissioners, a power that the governor's office has never regained.

In 1935, Johnston passed the Alcoholic Beverage Control Law to regulate the sale of alcohol in the state following the end of national prohibition. In 1937, he signed the South Carolina Public Welfare Act into law and established a state system for social security, worker's compensation and unemployment compensation. Where previous governors used the National Guard and martial law to crush strikes, Johnston used both to protect strikers and seal off mill precincts from strikebreakers. He often forced management to accept him as mediator and occasionally found state jobs for strikers whom mills refused to rehire.

Unable to run for re-election in 1938, Johnston challenged "Cotton Ed" Smith for his seat in the United States Senate. The race brought national interest, as Smith had developed into an opponent of the New Deal and Johnston was a strong supporter. Smith was one of the senators whom President Franklin D. Roosevelt attempted to purge. Ultimately, Johnston lost the race to Smith. However, it was widely accepted that Smith was highly unpopular in South Carolina and that Johnston would have won the primary if Roosevelt had not intervened on his behalf or if he had focused on either pleasing the state's influential textile mill owners or preserving racial segregation. Though Johnston did not defend rights for African Americans, he would largely ignore the issue of preserving racial segregation, believing that improving the public welfare was more important. Meanwhile, Smith had opposed Roosevelt's labor reform and for years campaigned on a two-plank platform to "keep the Negro down and the price of cotton up," and had recently demonstrated that he intended to maintain his fight to preserve racial segregation after he had walked out of the 1936 Democratic National Convention when he heard that a black minister was going to deliver the invocation.

Following Roosevelt's re-election, Johnston drew more ire from the state's local businessmen when he showed his support for the President's new push for labor reform and outspokenly supported the Fair Labor Standards Act of 1938. South Carolina US Senator James F. Byrnes, though also an ardent New Dealer, opposed this new push, claiming it would make the state's textile mills uncompetitive. As a result of Johnston's support for new labor reform, Byrnes—a highly popular and influential figure in the state who won re-election in the 1936 Democratic primary with over 87% of the vote-- declined to endorse Johnston and instead supported the re-election of Smith. Following his loss in 1938, Johnston then ran for the Senate in a 1941 special election to replace Byrnes, who had just been appointed to the Supreme Court, but lost to South Carolina Governor Burnet R. Maybank.

Johnston was elected Governor of South Carolina again in 1942. He won a narrow victory in the Democratic primary, and ran unopposed in the general election. However, he still desired a Senate seat. The outbreak of World War II meant that labor issues would not be as prominent in Johnston's second term. During that second term, he focused more on preserving racial segregation and signed laws which attempted to circumvent the Smith v. Allwright decision, which declared racially segregated primaries to be unconstitutional, by allowing political parties in the state to operate as private organizations separate from state control and therefore beyond the reach of the U.S. Supreme Court. He served until his resignation on January 3, 1945, the same day he was sworn into the U.S. Senate seat that he had been seeking for several years.

Johnston had finally been elected to the Senate in 1944, defeating "Cotton Ed" Smith in a rematch of their 1938 race. He was subsequently re-elected three times and served in the Senate until his death in 1965. Johnston served on the committees on Agriculture and Forestry, District of Columbia, Judiciary, and Post Office and Civil Service. He became chairman of the Post Office and Civil Service Committee in 1950 and gained the nickname "Mr. Civil Service" for his leadership on that committee and dedication to the needs and interests of postal and other federal employees. He also joined with fellow Southerners as part of the conservative Southern Democratic coalition.

Johnston was not as conservative as most other senators from the Deep South, retaining a populist position on many economic issues. In the Senate, Johnston was a staunch advocate of public power, parity programs for farmers, a broad strong social security program, and the provision of lunches to needy school children. He also generally opposed foreign aid, viewing it as support of foreign interests at the expense of American industry and consumers. Unlike most Southern Democrats, Johnston opposed the anti-union Taft-Hartley labor law in 1947 and he voted for both the War on Poverty in 1964 and for Medicare shortly before his death in 1965. However, like virtually all other politicians from the Deep South during this period, Johnston was regionally orthodox on the "race question", opposing all civil rights legislation and signing the 1956 Southern Manifesto that opposed the desegregation of public schools ordered by the Supreme Court in Brown v. Board of Education.

While not a prominent figure nationally, Johnston was very well entrenched in his home state. He may be the only senator to have defeated two future senators. He retained his seat despite challenges from Strom Thurmond in the Democratic primary in 1950 and Ernest Hollings in the 1962 primary. He then turned aside the first Republican challenger, journalist W. D. Workman Jr. In each of these races Johnston was the more liberal candidate. Hollings, who was governor in 1962, attacked Johnston as "the tool of the Northern labor bosses", but Johnston defeated Hollings by a 2–1 margin.

=== Execution of George Stinney ===
Johnston denied clemency to George Stinney, a 14-year-old African American boy who was sentenced to execution by the electric chair in 1944. Stinney had been wrongfully convicted for the murders of 11-year-old Betty June Binnicker and 8-year-old Mary Emma Thames in his hometown of Alcolu, South Carolina. Johnston wrote in a response to one appeal for clemency that

It may be interesting for you to know that Stinney killed the smaller girl to rape the larger one. Then he killed the larger girl and raped her dead body. Twenty minutes later he returned and attempted to rape her again, but her body was too cold. All of this he admitted himself.

It is reported that these statements were merely rumors, and were contradicted at the time by the medical examination report on the girl's body. In 2014, 70 years after the execution, Stinney's conviction was posthumously overturned. His case is remembered in the modern day as a wrongful execution and miscarriage of justice.

== Death ==
Johnston died on April 18, 1965, following a long battle with cancer. In eulogizing Johnston, his longtime associate, Senator George Aiken of Vermont, noted – "During his entire career in the Senate, he worked for those who needed his help most and whom it would have been easy to ignore and neglect." At the dedication of the Johnston Room at the South Caroliniana Library, Governor Robert McNair described Johnston as "a working man, and those who made his public life possible were working people....He was a man of conviction who arrived at a time when hard decisions had to be made." Johnston was interred in a cemetery at Barkers Creek Baptist Church, where he attended Sunday services during his boyhood years, near Honea Path, South Carolina.

Johnston's daughter, Elizabeth Johnston Patterson, served in the U.S. House of Representatives from South Carolina's 4th congressional district from 1987 to 1993. In the 1986 general election she defeated Mayor Bill Workman of Greenville, the son of the man whom her father had defeated in his last race for the U.S. Senate in 1962. Patterson was the unsuccessful 1994 Democratic nominee for lieutenant governor.

== See also ==
- List of members of the United States Congress who died in office (1950–1999)

Party political offices
Preceded by Ibra Charles Blackwood	Democratic nominee for Governor of South Carolina; 1934	Succeeded by Burnet R. Maybank
Preceded by Burnet R. Maybank	Democratic nominee for Governor of South Carolina; 1942	Succeeded by Strom Thurmond
Preceded by Ellison D. Smith	Democratic nominee for Senator from South Carolina (Class 3); 1944, 1950, 1956, 1962	Succeeded by Fritz Hollings
U.S. Senate
Preceded by Wilton E. Hall	U.S. senator (Class 3) from South Carolina; January 3, 1945 – April 18, 1965; Served alongside: Burnet R. Maybank, Charles Ezra Daniel, Strom Thurmond, Thomas A. Wofford, Strom Thurmond	Succeeded by Donald S. Russell
Political offices
Preceded by Ibra Charles Blackwood	Governor of South Carolina; 1935–1939	Succeeded by Burnet R. Maybank
Preceded by Richard Manning Jefferies	Governor of South Carolina; 1943–1945	Succeeded by Ransome Judson Williams
