= Thomas and Meeks Griffin =

American farmers wrongfully executed for murder

- Born: 1887 or 1888 (Thomas); 1889 or 1890 (Meeks); Blackstock, South Carolina, U.S.
- Died: September 29, 1915 (aged 27 and 25); South Carolina Penitentiary, South Carolina, U.S.
- Occupation: Farmers
- Known for: Wrongful execution
- Criminal charges: Murder
- Criminal status: Executed by electrocution Pardoned (posthumous)

Thomas Griffin and Meeks Griffin (died September 29, 1915) were American brothers and prominent Black farmers who were wrongfully executed for the 1913 murder of John Q. Lewis. Their conviction, as well as that of their co-defendants, Nelson Brice and John Crosby, was based on the testimony by a fifth codefendant, who was sentenced to life imprisonment in exchange for his cooperation.

== Life ==
Thomas and Meeks Griffin were born as the second and third sons to Franklin and Julia Griffin in Blackstock, South Carolina. Their parents owned 130 acres (53 ha) of land in Chester County, South Carolina, which they took over and worked on as adults. They had an older brother, John, and Clarence Preston and sister Dorothy, Julia and a younger sister, Ruth. Thomas was also called Tom while Meeks was also known as Mitch.

On the night to April 24, 1913, 75-year-old John Quarles Lewis was killed during a home invasion on his farm in Blackstock. He was discovered the following morning by Jim Dove, who worked on the property as a farmhand. Lewis' house was ten miles away from Chester, with the nearest inhabited place being the Cornwell Inn three miles away. Lewis, a wealthy farmer and Confederate veteran, had been shot twice in the back and chest with a shotgun. A stash of $40 (equivalent to $1,303 in 2025) was left undiscovered. Shortly after, police arrested a young black couple, Anna and Dave Davis, on suspicion of murder, but they were released two months later for lack of evidence. Later, John "Monk" Stevenson, a small-time thief, was arrested after he was found in possession of the victim's pistol.

While in custody, Stevenson issued a confession and implicated four others in the burglary, those being the Griffin brothers, Nelson Brice, and John Crosby. Stevenson claimed that he had directed the other men to Lewis' house, but not participated due to having a lame leg and that he was not satisfied with the share of the loot (the pistol and a Confederate pocket watch). After the four others were arrested on June 14, Stevenson made a plea deal with the authorities implicating his co-defendants in exchange for a life sentence. In July 1913, the other defendants were sentenced to death. There was no physical evidence against the four suspects, who continued to plead their innocence. The Griffin brothers and Crosby made repeated unsuccessful appeals, including to the South Carolina Supreme Court. Among others argumentation, a statement was entered by Hattie Budget, who had shared a jail cell with Stevenson, claiming that the latter had admitted to falsely accusing the Griffin brothers of involvement in the murder. The sentence of all four condemned was affirmed on June 1, 1914.

Some in the community believed that the murder might have been the result of Lewis's suspected sexual relationship with 22-year-old Anna Davis. Davis and her husband were never tried, possibly for fear of a miscegenation scandal. The Griffin brothers, who were believed to be the wealthiest Black people in the area, sold their 138-acre (56 ha) farm to pay for their defense against the accusations.

The Griffin brothers, Brice, and Crosby were executed via electric chair on September 29, 1915. The execution was held on 11:10 and officially ended on 12:20. Thomas Griffin was 27, Meeks Griffin was 25, Brice was 20, and Crosby around 33.

Executed alongside the four men was 45-year-old Joe Malloy, convicted of the 1910 murders of two white boys, 11-year-old Prentiss Moore and 15-year-old Guy Rogers, who had trespassed on his property in Marlboro County, South Carolina, while hunting. Malloy was also suspected of killing his wife to cover up the double murder. Malloy's execution was the subject of the US Supreme Court case Malloy v. South Carolina in 1915. Their deaths marked what was then the single largest legally processed mass execution in South Carolina history. The record was broken by a sextuple execution in 1931.

== Legacy ==
Over 100 people petitioned Gov. Richard Manning to commute the brothers' sentence. The signatories included Blackstock's mayor, a sheriff, two trial jurors and the grand jury foreman. Nevertheless, they were sent to the electric chair. Thomas Griffin and Meeks Griffin were pardoned in October 2009 after Tom Joyner, who was the grandnephew of the Griffin brothers through his father's family, sought from state appeals court in Columbia, South Carolina.

Joyner learned about his relationship to the Griffins through research conducted for the PBS documentary, African American Lives 2, by Harvard scholar Henry Louis Gates Jr., which also traced 11 other relatives.

Their case was dramatized in the 2021 supernatural horror film, Blackstock Boneyard. In said film, they return from the grave one hundred years later to take revenge on the descendants of the people responsible for their deaths.

== See also ==
- Capital punishment in South Carolina
- List of people executed in South Carolina (pre-1972)
- List of people executed in the United States in 1915
- List of wrongful convictions in the United States
- Wrongful executions in the United States
