= Blackstock, South Carolina =

- Unincorporated community
- Location within South Carolina Location within the United States
- Coordinates: 34°33′31″N 81°09′08″W
- Country: United States
- State: South Carolina
- Counties: Chester, Fairfield
- Elevation: 620 ft (190 m)
- Time zone: UTC-5 (Eastern (EST))
  - Summer (DST): UTC-4 (EDT)
- ZIP code: 29014
- Area codes: 803, 839
- GNIS feature ID: 1246908

Blackstock is an unincorporated community in Chester and Fairfield counties in the Midlands of South Carolina about 45 miles (72 km) north of Columbia. The elevation of the community is 620 feet (190 m). Its ZIP code is 29014.

== Government ==
Blackstock is an unincorporated community. Accordingly, it has no municipal government.

Certain portions of the community are located in Fairfield County, while others are located in Chester County. As a result, both counties exercise a measure of control over the affairs of the community and provide services to it.

== History ==
Edward Blackstock, an early postmaster, named the community after himself.

The Cornwell Inn, located on Blackstock Road, was listed on the National Register of Historic Places in 1994.

In 1925, Blackstock had 206 inhabitants.

== Attractions ==
A monument dedicated to the slave Burrel Hemphill is on the front grounds of Hopewell ARP Church. The monument consists of a small stone building with a placard that reads: "In memory of Burrel Hemphill, killed by Union soldiers February 1865. Although a slave, he gave his life rather than betray a trust. He was a member of Hopewell." One account of Hemphill's death states that he was tortured and killed by U.S. soldiers after refusing to disclose where his master had hidden certain valuables. The story of Burrel Hemphill's sacrifice has been the subject of historical programs led by Dr. W.T. Holmes, a descendant of Mr. Hemphill's, as recently as 2017.

A gymnasium which was once part of Blackstock High School has hosted bluegrass concerts on a weekly basis since November 1998. The venue hosts multiple stages where performers are permitted to play regardless of age or skill level.

The Durham Mercantile Company, which once served as the economic hub of the community as a dry goods store and bank, is on Durham Road.

The Blackstock Fish Camp is listed among the limited number of fish camps to try in South Carolina by The South Carolina Department of Parks, Recreation and Tourism. Founded by John "Big John" Boulware in the 20th century, it is owned by his descendants at its original location at 1844 Blackstock Road.

== Notable natives ==
- Jesse Max Barber, Black journalist, later dentist
- Ed "Bull" Durham, Major League Baseball pitcher
- Robert J. McMullen, Presbyterian minister and missionary

== Posthumous pardon ==
On April 24, 1913, Confederate States of America veteran John Q. Lewis was murdered in Blackstock. An investigation of the murder led to the arrest, prosecution, and conviction of Thomas and Meeks Griffin - two African-American residents of the town. Doubts about the conviction inspired more than 150 residents of the town, including the mayor and a former sheriff of Chester County, to petition for governor of South Carolina to commute the sentences. The list of petitioners included "many white leaders of the community and ordinary white citizens." However, the men were executed on September 29, 1915. Research demonstrating the inequity of the matter was presented to the parole board in 2009 and led the state to issue its first posthumous pardon in a capital murder case.
