= List of people executed in South Carolina (pre-1972) =

The following is a list of people executed by the U.S. state of South Carolina before 1972, when capital punishment was briefly abolished by the Supreme Court's ruling in Furman v. Georgia. For executions after the restoration of capital punishment by the Supreme Court's ruling in Gregg v. Georgia (1976), see List of people executed in South Carolina.

== Hanging ==
Slave executions
Slave executions by burning

=== 1788–1799 ===
| Name | Race | Age | Sex | Date of execution | County | Crime | Victim(s) | Governor |
|---|---|---|---|---|---|---|---|---|
| Unknown | White | | M | June 9, 1788 | Charleston | Murder | | Thomas Pinckney |
| Unknown | White | | M | June 9, 1788 | Charleston | Murder | | Thomas Pinckney |
| John George | White | | M | June 11, 1788 | Charleston | Murder-Robbery | John Nicholas Wightman, white | Thomas Pinckney |
| Ann Connolly | White | | F | June 11, 1788 | Charleston | Murder-Robbery | John Nicholas Wightman, white | Thomas Pinckney |
| Edward Hatcher | White | | M | June 11, 1788 | Charleston | Murder-Robbery | John Nicholas Wightman, white | Thomas Pinckney |
| Josiah Jordan | White | | M | June 11, 1788 | Charleston | Murder-Robbery | John Nicholas Wightman, white | Thomas Pinckney |
| Thomas Smith | White | | M | June 11, 1788 | Charleston | Murder-Robbery | John Nicholas Wightman, white | Thomas Pinckney |
| Robert Stacey | White | | M | June 11, 1788 | Charleston | Murder-Robbery | John Nicholas Wightman, white | Thomas Pinckney |
| John Masters | White | | M | June 16, 1788 | Charleston | Piracy | Abraham Nathan, white | Thomas Pinckney |
| William Pendergrasse | White | | M | June 16, 1788 | Charleston | Piracy | Abraham Nathan, white | Thomas Pinckney |
| William Rogers | White | | M | June 16, 1788 | Charleston | Piracy | Abraham Nathan, white | Thomas Pinckney |
| Richard Williams | White | | M | June 19, 1788 | Charleston | Piracy | | Thomas Pinckney |
| William Shaw | White | | M | June 19, 1788 | Charleston | Piracy | | Thomas Pinckney |
| Unknown | Black | | M | December 1788 | Marlboro | Murder | Joseph Pledger, white (owner) | Thomas Pinckney |
| James Clark | White | | M | May 13, 1789 | Kershaw | Burglary | | Charles Pinckney |
| William Brown | White | | M | October 21, 1789 | Charleston | Unspecified felonies | | Charles Pinckney |
| John Roberts | White | | M | October 21, 1789 | Charleston | Unspecified felonies | | Charles Pinckney |
| William Jones | White | | M | October 27, 1789 | Charleston | Horse stealing | | Charles Pinckney |
| William Pillon | White | | M | November 3, 1789 | Charleston | Horse stealing | | Charles Pinckney |
| Unknown | Black | | M | April 1790 | | Murder | Mr. Keith, white (owner) | Charles Pinckney |
| Unknown | Black | | M | April 1790 | | Murder | Mr. Keith, white (owner) | Charles Pinckney |
| Unknown | Black | | M | April 1790 | | Murder | Mr. Keith, white (owner) | Charles Pinckney |
| Jerry | Black | | M | August 16, 1790 | Charleston | Murder | Cudjoe, black | Charles Pinckney |
| Unknown | Black | | M | February 9, 1791 | Berkeley | Murder | Thomas Riddal, white (overseer) | Charles Pinckney |
| Unknown | Black | | M | February 9, 1791 | Berkeley | Murder | Thomas Riddal, white (overseer) | Charles Pinckney |
| Thomas Washington | White | | M | March 30, 1791 | Charleston | Forgery | | Charles Pinckney |
| John Harbison | White | | M | April 30, 1791 | Kershaw | Murder | Richard Russell, white | Charles Pinckney |
| King | Black | | M | May 1791 (Note: Gibbeted alive.) | Beaufort | Murder | Mr. Mungen, white | Charles Pinckney |
| John Fuller | White | | M | June 28, 1792 | Charleston | Forgery | | Charles Pinckney |
| Powell | White | | M | October 4, 1793 | Charleston | Slave stealing | | William Moultrie |
| Michael Bouche | White | | M | June 8, 1794 | Charleston | Murder | Mr. Duncan, white | William Moultrie |
| Alexander | White | | M | June 15, 1794 | Charleston | Horse stealing | | William Moultrie |
| Gray Briggs | White | | M | December 5, 1794 | Kershaw | Horse stealing | | William Moultrie |
| Unknown | White | | M | June 15, 1795 | Charleston | Slave stealing | | Arnoldus Vanderhorst |
| Unknown | White | | M | June 15, 1795 | Charleston | Slave stealing | | Arnoldus Vanderhorst |
| Sally Arden | White | | F | October 19, 1795 | Charleston | Murder | John Keith, white | Arnoldus Vanderhorst |
| William Powers | White | | M | November 13, 1795 | Union | Horse stealing | | Arnoldus Vanderhorst |
| Patrick Morris | White | | M | November 13, 1795 | Union | Horse stealing | | Arnoldus Vanderhorst |
| Molly | Mixed (Note: Mulatta.) | | F | September 5, 1796 | Charleston | Arson | Capt. Vesey, white | Arnoldus Vanderhorst |
| Will | Black | | M | October 10, 1796 | Charleston | Arson | Mr. Pyeat, white (owner) | Arnoldus Vanderhorst |
| Sinclair | White | | M | October 28, 1796 | Charleston | Murder | Archibald Gaillard, white | Arnoldus Vanderhorst |
| Unknown | Black | | M | November 13, 1797 | Richland | Attempted murder (Note: Victim died from his injuries after the conviction but before the execution.) | Robert Maxwell, white (sheriff) | Charles Pinckney |
| Figaro | Black | | M | November 21, 1797 | Charleston | Conspiracy to arson | | Charles Pinckney |
| Jean Louis | Black | | M | November 21, 1797 | Charleston | Conspiracy to arson | | Charles Pinckney |
| Mercredi | Black | | M | November 28, 1797 | Charleston | Conspiracy to arson | | Charles Pinckney |
| Mary | Black | | F | July 9, 1798 | Charleston | Arson | | Charles Pinckney |

=== 1800s ===
| Name | Race | Age | Sex | Date of execution | County | Crime | Victim(s) | Governor |
|---|---|---|---|---|---|---|---|---|
| Willis Daniels | White | 35 | M | May 16, 1800 | Orangeburg | Horse stealing | | John Drayton |
| Ben | Black | | M | December 4, 1800 | Charleston | Murder | Male, white | John Drayton |
| Stuart | Black | | M | December 5, 1800 | Charleston | Murder | Male, white | John Drayton |
| William Tate | White | | M | 1802 | Newberry | Horse stealing | | Drayton or Richardson |
| Unknown | Mixed (Note: Mulatto.) | | M | May 1803 | Charleston | Murder-Robbery | Charles James Air, white | James Burchill Richardson |
| James Harvey | White | | M | December 10, 1804 | Colleton | Murder | Richard Johnson, white | Paul Hamilton |
| Joshua Nettles | White | | M | February 8, 1805 | Berkeley | Murder | John Cannon, white (girlfriend's husband) | Paul Hamilton |
| Richard Dennis | White | | M | February 8, 1805 | Charleston | Murder | James Shaw, 28 or 30, white | Paul Hamilton |
| Anthony | Black | | M | January 17, 1806 | Georgetown | Robbery | Two females, white | Paul Hamilton |
| Joe | Black | | M | January 23, 1806 | Richland | Attempted murder-Robbery | Walter Carson Dixon, white | Paul Hamilton |
| Conrad Englebart | White | | M | January 5, 1807 | Greenville | Murder | John Holmes, white | Charles Pinckney |
| Unknown | White | | M | May 27, 1808 | Spartanburg | Forgery | | Charles Pinckney |
| Jim | Black | | M | April 7, 1809 | Charleston | Arson | Mr. Lege, white | John Drayton |
| Sue | Black | | F | April 7, 1809 | Charleston | Arson | Mr. Lege, white | John Drayton |
| Ludovic Rochelle | White | | M | June 9, 1809 | Kershaw | Murder | David Minton, white | John Drayton |
| Jesse Fley | White | | M | July 7, 1809 | Kershaw | Murder | David Minton, white | John Drayton |

=== 1810s ===
| Name | Race | Age | Sex | Date of execution | County | Crime | Victim(s) | Governor |
|---|---|---|---|---|---|---|---|---|
| Bristoe | Black | | M | 1810 | Darlington | Burglary | | Drayton or Henry Middleton |
| Peter Mathereau | White | | M | January 29, 1813 | Charleston | Murder | William Chambers, white | Joseph Alston |
| Unknown | White | | M | March 1813 | | Slave stealing and horse stealing | | Joseph Alston |
| John Francis LeBlac | White | | M | May 25, 1813 | Charleston | Rape | Female, <10, white | Joseph Alston |
| David Virtue | White | | M | April 22, 1814 (Note: Executed by firing squad.) | Charleston (Military) | Sleeping on sentry duty | N/A | Joseph Alston |
| John Parrish | White | | M | April 22, 1814 | Charleston (Military) | Mutiny | Ensign Taylor, white | Joseph Alston |
| Unknown | Black | | M | August 4, 1814 | Charleston | Murder | Mr. Wright, white (overseer) | Joseph Alston |
| Sally | Mixed (Note: Mulatta.) | 15 | F | August 26, 1814 | Charleston | Arson | Mordecai Cohen, white (owner) | Joseph Alston |
| March | Black | | M | July 5, 1816 | Kershaw | Slave revolt | | David Rogerson Williams |
| Cameron | Black | | M | July 5, 1816 | Kershaw | Slave revolt | | David Rogerson Williams |
| Jack | Black | | M | July 5, 1816 | Kershaw | Slave revolt | | David Rogerson Williams |
| Isaac | Black | | M | July 5, 1816 | Kershaw | Slave revolt | | David Rogerson Williams |
| Spottswood | Black | | M | July 5, 1816 | Kershaw | Slave revolt | | David Rogerson Williams |
| Ned | Black | | M | July 12, 1816 | Kershaw | Slave revolt | | David Rogerson Williams |
| John Gibson | Black | | M | February 21, 1817 | Charleston (Federal) | Murder | Unknown, white | Andrew Pickens |
| Jerry | Black | | M | 1819 | Newberry | Murder | David Waters, white (owner) | John Geddes |
| Thomas | White | | M | 1819 | | Murder-Robbery | Male, white | John Geddes |
| Martin Toohey | White | | M | May 28, 1819 | Charleston | Murder | J. W. Gadsden, white | John Geddes |

=== 1820s ===
| Name | Race | Age | Sex | Date of execution | County | Crime | Victim(s) | Governor |
|---|---|---|---|---|---|---|---|---|
| Ephriam | Black | | M | January 28, 1820 | Edgefield | Murder | Thomas Hancock, white (owner) | John Geddes |
| Sam | Black | | M | January 28, 1820 | Edgefield | Murder | Thomas Hancock, white (owner) | John Geddes |
| Lavinia Fisher | White | 27 | F | February 18, 1820 | Charleston | Murder-Robbery | Multiple males, white | John Geddes |
| John Fisher | White | 28 | M | February 18, 1820 | Charleston | Murder-Robbery | Multiple males, white | John Geddes |
| Albro | Black | | M | March 4, 1820 | Berkeley | Murder | Thomas Deliesseline, white | John Geddes |
| George Clark | White | | M | May 12, 1820 | Charleston (Federal) | Piracy | | John Geddes |
| Henry Roberts | White | | M | May 12, 1820 | Charleston (Federal) | Piracy | | John Geddes |
| William Hayward | White | | M | August 11, 1820 | Charleston | Robbery | | John Geddes |
| Cain | Black | | M | February 9, 1821 | Richland | Murder | Dick, black | Thomas Bennett Jr. |
| Jack | Black | | M | June 8, 1821 | Georgetown | Conspiracy to murder | G. R. Ford, white (owner) | Thomas Bennett Jr. |
| Peter | Black | | M | July 2, 1822 | Charleston | Slave revolt | | Thomas Bennett Jr. |
| Ned | Black | | M | July 2, 1822 | Charleston | Slave revolt | | Thomas Bennett Jr. |
| Rolla | Black | | M | July 2, 1822 | Charleston | Slave revolt | | Thomas Bennett Jr. |
| Batteau | Black | 18 | M | July 2, 1822 | Charleston | Slave revolt | | Thomas Bennett Jr. |
| Denmark Vesey | Black | 55 | M | July 2, 1822 | Charleston | Slave revolt | | Thomas Bennett Jr. |
| Jesse | Black | | M | July 2, 1822 | Charleston | Slave revolt | | Thomas Bennett Jr. |
| John | Black | | M | July 12, 1822 | Charleston | Slave revolt | | Thomas Bennett Jr. |
| Gullah Jack | Black | | M | July 12, 1822 | Charleston | Slave revolt | | Thomas Bennett Jr. |
| Mingo | Black | | M | July 26, 1822 | Charleston | Slave revolt | | Thomas Bennett Jr. |
| Lot | Black | | M | July 26, 1822 | Charleston | Slave revolt | | Thomas Bennett Jr. |
| Joe | Black | | M | July 26, 1822 | Charleston | Slave revolt | | Thomas Bennett Jr. |
| Julius | Black | | M | July 26, 1822 | Charleston | Slave revolt | | Thomas Bennett Jr. |
| Tom | Black | | M | July 26, 1822 | Charleston | Slave revolt | | Thomas Bennett Jr. |
| Smart | Black | | M | July 26, 1822 | Charleston | Slave revolt | | Thomas Bennett Jr. |
| John | Black | | M | July 26, 1822 | Charleston | Slave revolt | | Thomas Bennett Jr. |
| Robert | Black | | M | July 26, 1822 | Charleston | Slave revolt | | Thomas Bennett Jr. |
| Adam | Black | | M | July 26, 1822 | Charleston | Slave revolt | | Thomas Bennett Jr. |
| Polydore | Black | | M | July 26, 1822 | Charleston | Slave revolt | | Thomas Bennett Jr. |
| Bacchus | Black | | M | July 26, 1822 | Charleston | Slave revolt | | Thomas Bennett Jr. |
| Dick | Black | | M | July 26, 1822 | Charleston | Slave revolt | | Thomas Bennett Jr. |
| Pharoah | Black | | M | July 26, 1822 | Charleston | Slave revolt | | Thomas Bennett Jr. |
| Jemmy | Black | | M | July 26, 1822 | Charleston | Slave revolt | | Thomas Bennett Jr. |
| Jerry | Black | | M | July 26, 1822 | Charleston | Slave revolt | | Thomas Bennett Jr. |
| Dean | Black | | M | July 26, 1822 | Charleston | Slave revolt | | Thomas Bennett Jr. |
| Jack | Black | | M | July 26, 1822 | Charleston | Slave revolt | | Thomas Bennett Jr. |
| Bellisle | Black | | M | July 26, 1822 | Charleston | Slave revolt | | Thomas Bennett Jr. |
| Naphur | Black | | M | July 26, 1822 | Charleston | Slave revolt | | Thomas Bennett Jr. |
| Adam | Black | | M | July 26, 1822 | Charleston | Slave revolt | | Thomas Bennett Jr. |
| Jack | Black | | M | July 26, 1822 | Charleston | Slave revolt | | Thomas Bennett Jr. |
| Charles | Black | | M | July 26, 1822 | Charleston | Slave revolt | | Thomas Bennett Jr. |
| Jack | Black | | M | July 30, 1822 | Charleston | Slave revolt | | Thomas Bennett Jr. |
| Caesar | Black | | M | July 30, 1822 | Charleston | Slave revolt | | Thomas Bennett Jr. |
| Jacob Stagg | Black | | M | July 30, 1822 | Charleston | Slave revolt | | Thomas Bennett Jr. |
| Tom | Black | | M | July 30, 1822 | Charleston | Slave revolt | | Thomas Bennett Jr. |
| William | Black | | M | August 9, 1822 | Charleston | Slave revolt | | Thomas Bennett Jr. |
| Samuel W. Whitworth | White | 33 | M | December 1823 | | | | John Lyde Wilson |
| Crosby | White | | M | April 2, 1824 | Beaufort | Horse stealing | | John Lyde Wilson |
| Unknown | Black | | F | April 25, 1824 | Edgefield | Murder | Three children, white | John Lyde Wilson |
| Gilson Foot | White | 59 | M | August 6, 1824 | Edgefield | Horse stealing | | John Lyde Wilson |
| Tom | Black | | M | 1825 | Darlington | Rape | Female, white | Richard Irvine Manning I |
| James Bone | White | | M | January 21, 1825 | Chesterfield | Murder | James Wyatt, white | Richard Irvine Manning I |
| Unknown | Black | | F | February 24, 1825 | Sumter | Murder | Mrs. Stuckey, white (owner) | Richard Irvine Manning I |
| William | Black | | M | July 1, 1825 | Greenville | Murder | Peter Garrison, white | Richard Irvine Manning I |
| Jack | Black | | M | August 1825 | Abbeville | Murder-Rape | | Richard Irvine Manning I |
| Isaac Cox | White | 20 | M | February 24, 1826 | Anderson | Robbery | | Richard Irvine Manning I |
| Edinburgh | Black | 17 | M | March 20, 1826 | Charleston | Arson | Rev. Arthur Buist, white | Richard Irvine Manning I |
| Stephen | Black | | M | March 20, 1826 | Williamsburg | | | Richard Irvine Manning I |
| Stephen | Black | | M | July 27, 1826 | Georgetown | | | Richard Irvine Manning I |
| Abner | Black | | M | August 7, 1826 | Williamsburg | Robbery | | Richard Irvine Manning I |
| Elisha Melton | White | | M | December 1, 1826 | Edgefield | Murder | Lewis Clark, white | Richard Irvine Manning I |
| James Barrantyne | White | | M | March 2, 1827 | Kershaw | Murder | Jesse Fley, white | John Taylor |
| Hannah | Black | | F | June 1, 1827 | York | Poisoning | Unknown, child, white (Note: Also previously attempted to poison her owner's whole family.) | John Taylor |
| John Wood | White | | M | June 13, 1827 | Anderson | Murder | Elizabeth Wood, white (wife) | John Taylor |
| Unknown | Black | | M | September 1827 | Colleton | Murder | Capt. Priester, white | John Taylor |
| Unknown | Black | | M | September 1827 | Colleton | Murder | Capt. Priester, white | John Taylor |
| Unknown | Black | | M | December 7, 1827 | Berkeley | Murder | John Evans, white | John Taylor |
| Wilson | White | | M | January 4, 1828 | Colleton | Murder | Capt. Priester, white | John Taylor |
| Wilson | White | | M | January 4, 1828 | Colleton | Murder | Capt. Priester, white | John Taylor |
| Antony King | White | | M | January 11, 1828 | Charleston | Murder | Mary Ann Smith, white | John Taylor |
| Jesse | Black | | M | January 18, 1828 | Chesterfield | Arson | N/A (Note: Convicted of burning the town council house in Cheraw.) | John Taylor |
| Uriah Sligh | White | | M | February 22, 1828 | Anderson | Murder | Jehu Orr, white | John Taylor |
| Absalom Roe | White | | M | March 7, 1828 | Edgefield | Murder | William Roe, white (brother) | John Taylor |
| Shadrick Jacobs | White | 70 | M | June 19, 1829 | Fairfield | Murder | Andrew Feaster, white | Stephen Decatur Miller |
| Charles Prioleau | Black | | M | October 18, 1829 | Georgetown | Slave revolt | | Stephen Decatur Miller |
| Charles | Black | | M | December 11, 1829 | Georgetown | Arson | Capt. P. Cuttino, white (owner) | Stephen Decatur Miller |

=== 1830s ===
| Name | Race | Age | Sex | Date of execution | County | Crime | Victim(s) | Governor |
|---|---|---|---|---|---|---|---|---|
| George | Black | | M | February 26, 1830 | Newberry | Murder | David G. Sims, white (owner) | Stephen Decatur Miller |
| John | Black | | M | February 26, 1830 | Newberry | Murder | David G. Sims, white (owner) | Stephen Decatur Miller |
| Kiah | Black | | M | February 26, 1830 | Newberry | Murder | David G. Sims, white (owner) | Stephen Decatur Miller |
| Moses | Black | | M | February 26, 1830 | Newberry | Murder | David G. Sims, white (owner) | Stephen Decatur Miller |
| Unknown | Black | | M | August 1830 | Abbeville | Attempted murder | Female, white (owner) | Stephen Decatur Miller |
| Johnathan Campbell | White | | M | October 27, 1830 | Anderson | Murder | William Browning, white | Stephen Decatur Miller |
| Alexander Moore | White | | M | November 12, 1830 | Marion | Forgery | | Stephen Decatur Miller |
| David G. Sims Jr. | White | | M | 1831 | Newberry | Accessory to murder | David G. Sims, white (father) | James Hamilton Jr. |
| Thomas Crank | White | | M | March 4, 1831 | Chester | Murder | Stephen Crank, white (father) (Note: Convinced one of his father's slaves, Jack, to commit the murder; Jack's fate is unknown.) | James Hamilton Jr. |
| Unknown | Black | | M | April 15, 1831 | Spartanburg | Murder | Mr. Woodruff, white | James Hamilton Jr. |
| Unknown | Black | | M | April 15, 1831 | Spartanburg | Murder | Mr. Woodruff, white | James Hamilton Jr. |
| Unknown | Black | | M | August 9, 1831 | Edgefield | Arson | N/A | James Hamilton Jr. |
| Joe | Black | | M | September 26, 1831 | Charleston | Attempted murder | E. L. Roche, white (owner) | James Hamilton Jr. |
| Glasgow | Black | | M | October 21, 1831 | Charleston | Poisoning | G. S. McLane, white (owner) | James Hamilton Jr. |
| William | Black | | M | August 17, 1832 | Charleston | Attempted murder | G. W. Cramer and R. E. Kimball, white | James Hamilton Jr. |
| Stepney | Black | | M | January 18, 1833 | Georgetown | Attempted murder | Dr. William Allston, white | Robert Y. Hayne |
| Wiley Anderson | White | | M | August 2, 1833 | Spartanburg | Murder | Male, white (posse member) (Note: Being pursued for a previous murder at time of crime.) | Robert Y. Hayne |
| Adam | Black | | M | September 13, 1833 | Charleston | Poisoning | Unknown family, black | Robert Y. Hayne |
| John G. Ferguson | White | | M | June 5, 1835 | Chester | Murder | | George McDuffie |
| Johnson | White | | M | April 8, 1836 | Edgefield | Slave stealing | | George McDuffie |
| Thomas Evans | White | | M | February 9, 1838 | Richland | Slave stealing | | Pierce Mason Butler |
| James Read | White | | M | February 9, 1838 | Richland | Slave stealing | | Pierce Mason Butler |
| Luis Llise | White | | M | June 8, 1838 | Charleston | Murder | David Johnson, 17, white | Pierce Mason Butler |
| Unknown | Black | | M | August 10, 1838 | Richland | Murder | Cunningham Boyle, white (owner) | Pierce Mason Butler |
| Unknown | Black | | M | August 10, 1838 | Richland | Murder | Cunningham Boyle, white (owner) | Pierce Mason Butler |
| Unknown | Black | | M | August 10, 1838 | Richland | Murder | Cunningham Boyle, white (owner) | Pierce Mason Butler |
| Unknown | Black | | M | October 17, 1838 | Anderson | Murder | Three people, white (Note: William Baxter (owner), his son, and his niece.) | Pierce Mason Butler |
| John Adams | White | | M | July 5, 1839 | Richland | Murder | Mrs. McBoy, white | Patrick Noble |
| William Ford | White | | M | August 16, 1839 | Spartanburg | Slave stealing | | Patrick Noble |
| Unknown | Black | | M | October 19, 1839 | Pickens | Murder-Robbery | Three people, white (Note: Mr. Baxter and his two children.) | Patrick Noble |

=== 1840s ===
| Name | Race | Age | Sex | Date of execution | County | Crime | Victim(s) | Governor |
|---|---|---|---|---|---|---|---|---|
| Ray | White | | M | March 6, 1840 | Chesterfield | Forgery | N/A | Patrick Noble |
| Wiley Freeman | White | 48 | M | February 17, 1843 | Edgefield | Murder | Female, white (wife) | James H. Hammond |
| Unknown | Black | | M | March 3, 1843 | Richland | Murder | Daniel McGaskill, white | James H. Hammond |
| Unknown | Black | | M | March 3, 1843 | Richland | Murder | Daniel McGaskill, white | James H. Hammond |
| Thomas N. McCants | White | | M | July 14, 1843 | Charleston | Murder | Mr. Ladd, white | James H. Hammond |
| Primus | Black | | M | August 11, 1843 | Newberry | Murder | Unknown, infant, mixed (child) (Note: Mulatto.) | James H. Hammond |
| Randall | Black | | M | August 25, 1843 | Laurens | Murder | Mrs. Harmon Garrett, white | James H. Hammond |
| Unknown | Black | | F | August 25, 1843 | Laurens | Murder | Mrs. Harmon Garrett, white | James H. Hammond |
| Peter | Black | | M | March 15, 1844 | Greenville | Murder | John Jones, white (owner) | James H. Hammond |
| Daniel Deas | White | | M | May 17, 1844 | Edgefield | Murder | William Barefoot, white (stepfather) | James H. Hammond |
| Unknown | Black | | M | July 26, 1844 | Chester | Murder-Burglary | Allen DeGraffenreid, white | James H. Hammond |
| Unknown | Black | | M | July 26, 1844 | Chester | Murder-Burglary | Allen DeGraffenreid, white | James H. Hammond |
| Unknown | Black | | M | July 26, 1844 | Chester | Murder-Burglary | Allen DeGraffenreid, white | James H. Hammond |
| Unknown | Black | 16 | M | April 25, 1845 | Edgefield | Murder | Ansel Talbert Sr., white (owner) | William Aiken Jr. |
| Isaac | Black | | M | November 25, 1845 | Chesterfield | Murder | John Bevill, white (jailer) | William Aiken Jr. |
| Dave | Black | | M | April 24, 1846 | Laurens | Murder | Capt. Vance, white (owner) | William Aiken Jr. |
| William Powell | White | | M | January 1, 1847 | Darlington | Slave stealing | | David Johnson |
| Cato | Black | | M | March 5, 1847 | Abbeville | Attempted rape | | David Johnson |
| Unknown | Black | | M | April 9, 1847 | Edgefield | Murder | Dr. Augustus W. Burt, white (owner) | David Johnson |
| Berry Morgan | White | | M | June 4, 1847 | Chesterfield | Murder | Andrew Jackson, white | David Johnson |
| Unknown | Black | | M | June 4, 1847 | Edgefield | Murder | Female, black (wife) | David Johnson |
| Reuben Stark | White | | M | July 23, 1847 | Sumter | Murder | Three people, white (wife and children) | David Johnson |
| Jane | Black | | F | September 10, 1847 | Charleston | Poisoning | Mrs. and Ms. Dukes, white (Note: Mother and daughter.) | David Johnson |
| Henry | Black | | M | September 10, 1847 | Charleston | Poisoning | Mrs. and Ms. Dukes, white | David Johnson |
| Unknown | Black | | M | January 14, 1848 | Abbeville | Murder | Leonard Wideman, white (owner) (Note: One of the three also confessed to murdering his previous owner, Mr. Ramsey, and staging the death to appear accidental.) | David Johnson |
| Unknown | Black | | M | January 14, 1848 | Abbeville | Murder | Leonard Wideman, white (owner) | David Johnson |
| Unknown | Black | | M | January 14, 1848 | Abbeville | Murder | Leonard Wideman, white (owner) | David Johnson |
| Isaac | Black | | M | September 1, 1848 | Sumter | Murder | I. Ervin, white | David Johnson |
| Harry | Black | | M | September 1, 1848 | Sumter | Murder | I. Ervin, white | David Johnson |
| Newton | Black | | M | September 1, 1848 | Sumter | Murder | I. Ervin, white | David Johnson |
| Thomas Henderson | White | | M | March 9, 1849 | Pickens | Murder | Robert Wilson, white | Whitemarsh Benjamin Seabrook |
| Carroll Henderson | White | | M | March 9, 1849 | Pickens | Murder | Robert Wilson, white | Whitemarsh Benjamin Seabrook |
| Charles | Black | | M | July 6, 1849 | Charleston | Murder | Thomas Morrison, white | Whitemarsh Benjamin Seabrook |
| Jimmy | Black | | M | July 6, 1849 | Charleston | Murder | Thomas Morrison, white | Whitemarsh Benjamin Seabrook |
| George | Black | | M | July 20, 1849 | Charleston | Slave revolt | Several males, white (guards) | Whitemarsh Benjamin Seabrook |
| John | Black | | M | July 20, 1849 | Charleston | Slave revolt | Several males, white (guards) | Whitemarsh Benjamin Seabrook |
| Nicholas | Black | | M | July 20, 1849 | Charleston | Slave revolt | Several males, white (guards) | Whitemarsh Benjamin Seabrook |
| Joe | Black | | M | September 21, 1849 | Edgefield | Murder | Jesse Weatherford, white | Whitemarsh Benjamin Seabrook |

=== 1850s ===
| Name | Race | Age | Sex | Date of execution | County | Crime | Victim(s) | Governor |
|---|---|---|---|---|---|---|---|---|
| Martin Posey | White | | M | 1850 | Edgefield | Murder | Matilda H. Posey, white (wife) (Note: Also tried for the murder of his slave, Appling, whom he convinced to commit the murder on his behalf.) | Seabrook or Means |
| Abram Rabon Jr. | White | | M | June 6, 1851 | Horry | Murder | Willis Rabon, white | John Hugh Means |
| Enoch Massey | White | | M | September 12, 1851 | Greenville | Murder | John Simpson Peden, white | John Hugh Means |
| Abram Rabon | White | | M | November 1851 | Horry | Murder | Willis Rabon, white | John Hugh Means |
| Phineas Johnson | White | | M | February 13, 1852 | Union | Murder | Mary Ann Hyatt, white (girlfriend) | John Hugh Means |
| L. A. J. Stubbs | White | | M | January 14, 1853 | Marlboro | Murder | Male, black | John Lawrence Manning |
| Charles | Black | | M | July 8, 1853 | Laurens | Murder-Robbery | Mr. Heffner, white | John Lawrence Manning |
| Jeremiah Stroud | White | | M | January 6, 1854 | Spartanburg | Murder | Samuel Gentry, white | John Lawrence Manning |
| Thomas Motley | White | | M | March 3, 1854 | Colleton | Murder | Male, black | John Lawrence Manning |
| William Blackledge | White | | M | March 3, 1854 | Colleton | Murder | Male, black | John Lawrence Manning |
| Merit | Black | | M | May 5, 1854 | Charleston | Murder | | John Lawrence Manning |
| Mose | Black | | M | September 15, 1854 | Abbeville | Murder | Jesse Mattox, white (overseer) | John Lawrence Manning |
| Tom | Black | | M | September 15, 1854 | Abbeville | Murder | Jesse Mattox, white (overseer) | John Lawrence Manning |
| Thomas W. Kinman | White | | M | September 24, 1854 | Laurens | Slave stealing | | John Lawrence Manning |
| James Vickers | White | | M | December 29, 1854 | York | Murder | William Dobson, white | James Hopkins Adams |
| Phillis | Black | | F | July 13, 1855 | Spartanburg | Murder | Holman Smith, white (owner) | James Hopkins Adams |
| John | Black | | M | July 13, 1855 | Spartanburg | Murder | Holman Smith, white (owner) | James Hopkins Adams |
| Clarissa | Black | | F | November 2, 1855 | York | Murder | Ms. Wilson, white (Note: Serial killer, also confessed to murdering members of three families who had previously owned her.) | James Hopkins Adams |
| Charles | Black | | M | November 9, 1855 | Aiken | Attempted rape | Female, white | James Hopkins Adams |
| James McCombs | White | | M | April 25, 1856 | Richland | | | James Hopkins Adams |
| Milton Chaney | White | | M | July 11, 1856 | Lancaster | Slave stealing | | James Hopkins Adams |
| Moses Gossett | White | | M | July 11, 1856 | Union | Slave stealing | | James Hopkins Adams |
| James A. Price | White | | M | June 26, 1857 | Union | Murder | Joseph Hughes, white | Robert Francis Withers Allston |
| Chesley Boatwright | White | | M | September 9, 1857 | Kershaw | Murder | Mr. Evans, white | Robert Francis Withers Allston |
| Woody T. Carter | White | | M | November 27, 1857 | Chester | Murder | James Gibson, white | Robert Francis Withers Allston |
| Starling Clayton | White | | M | February or March 1859 | Barnwell | Slave stealing | | William Henry Gist |
| Martin Carter | White | | M | February or March 1859 | Barnwell | Slave stealing | | William Henry Gist |
| James Goings | White | | M | March 13, 1859 | Richland | Murder | | William Henry Gist |
| Richard Foster | White | | M | March 25, 1859 | Charleston | Burglary | | William Henry Gist |
| Abraham Strickland | White | | M | June 17, 1859 | Colleton | Murder | James Strickland, white (uncle) | William Henry Gist |
| Fanny | Black | | F | July 15, 1859 | Edgefield | Murder | Female, white (owner) | William Henry Gist |
| Dan | Black | | M | November 4, 1859 | Lancaster | Murder | Amanda Massey, 13, white (girlfriend) | William Henry Gist |

=== 1860s ===
Executions by firing squad

| Name | Race | Age | Sex | Date of execution | County | Crime | Victim(s) | Governor |
|---|---|---|---|---|---|---|---|---|
| John C. Terrel | White | | M | April 20, 1860 | Marlboro | Murder | Ananias Graham, white (grandfather) | William Henry Gist |
| Sam | Black | | M | September 28, 1860 | Clarendon | Murder | George, black | William Henry Gist |
| Abraham | Black | | M | November 9, 1860 | Charleston | Murder | Samuel O'Connor, white | William Henry Gist |
| Richard White | White | | M | May 17, 1861 | Charleston | Murder | Female, white (wife) | Francis Wilkinson Pickens |
| Shade | Black | | M | March 1, 1861 | Lexington | Murder | Male, white (owner) | Francis Wilkinson Pickens |
| Rhodie | Black | | F | October 1861 | Darlington | Murder | Mrs. John D. Witherspoon, white | Francis Wilkinson Pickens |
| Romeo | Black | | M | October 1861 | Darlington | Murder | Mrs. John D. Witherspoon, white | Francis Wilkinson Pickens |
| Silvy | Black | | F | October 1861 | Darlington | Murder | Mrs. John D. Witherspoon, white | Francis Wilkinson Pickens |
| William | Black | | M | October 1861 | Darlington | Murder | Mrs. John D. Witherspoon, white | Francis Wilkinson Pickens |
| George Burger | White | | M | August 25, 1862 | Charleston (Military) | Desertion | N/A | Francis Wilkinson Pickens |
| William W. Lunt | White | 22 | M | December 1, 1862 | Beaufort (Military) (Note: Crimes committed in Florida.) | Desertion-Robbery | Ellen Manning, white | Francis Wilkinson Pickens |
| Jacob Adams | White | | M | May 18, 1863 | Charleston (Military) | Desertion | N/A | Milledge Luke Bonham |
| Unknown | White | | M | June 28, 1863 | Charleston (Military) | Desertion | N/A | Milledge Luke Bonham |
| John Kendall | White | | M | December 17, 1863 | Charleston (Military) (Note: Not specified if Union or Confederate.) | | | Milledge Luke Bonham |
| James Murphy | White | | M | January 6, 1864 | Beaufort (Military) | Desertion | N/A | Milledge Luke Bonham |
| Henry Schumaker | White | | M | April 17, 1864 | Beaufort (Military) | Desertion | N/A | Milledge Luke Bonham |
| Henry Stark | White | | M | April 17, 1864 | Beaufort (Military) | Desertion | N/A | Milledge Luke Bonham |
| Henry Jerome | White | | M | May 2, 1864 | Charleston (Military) | Desertion | N/A | Milledge Luke Bonham |
| John Flood | White | 22 | M | June 17, 1864 | Beaufort (Military) | Desertion | N/A | Milledge Luke Bonham |
| Wallace Baker | Black | 19 | M | June 18, 1864 | Charleston (Military) | Mutiny | N/A | Milledge Luke Bonham |
| N. D. Otis | White | | M | November 11, 1864 | Charleston (Military) | Desertion | N/A | Milledge Luke Bonham |
| George Shrewth | White | | M | November 11, 1864 | Charleston (Military) | Desertion | N/A | Milledge Luke Bonham |
| Benjamin Grover | White | | M | December 8, 1864 | Richland (Military) | Desertion | N/A (Note: Originally joined the Union Army as a Canadian volunteer (but later claimed to be a native Virginian) and then deserted to the Confederate Foreign Legion, from which he deserted again and was subsequently executed.) | Milledge Luke Bonham |
| Charles | Black | | M | January 6, 1865 | Charleston | Attempted murder | Mr. Brownlee, white | Andre Gordon Magrath |
| A. H. W. Robertson | White | | M | January 11, 1865 | Charleston (Military) | Desertion | N/A | Andre Gordon Magrath |
| Samuel A. Robertson | White | | M | January 11, 1865 | Charleston (Military) | Desertion | N/A | Andre Gordon Magrath |
| Kenneth Robertson | White | | M | January 11, 1865 | Charleston (Military) | Desertion | N/A | Andre Gordon Magrath |
| MacDillon | White | | M | January 11, 1865 | Charleston (Military) | Desertion | N/A | Andre Gordon Magrath |
| Amy Spain | Mixed (Note: Mulatta.) | 17 | F (Note: Believed to be the last female slave executed in the United States.) | March 10, 1865 | Darlington (Military) | Treason | | Andre Gordon Magrath |
| Billy Wilson | White | | M | September 23, 1865 | Georgetown | Murder | J. W. Skinner, white | Benjamin Franklin Perry |
| William Arnell | White | | M | September 23, 1865 | Georgetown | Murder | J. W. Skinner, white | Benjamin Franklin Perry |
| Lewis J. Harrell | White | 53 | M | June 1, 1866 | Marion | Murder | James H. Jarrott, 61, white | James Lawrence Orr |
| Henry Cheatham | Black | 22 | M | November 23, 1866 | Anderson | Murder | Samuel Albert Geer, 20, white | James Lawrence Orr |
| London Jones | Black | 24 | M | November 30, 1866 | Chester | Murder-Burglary | Alexander D. Walker, 38, white (Note: Serial killer, also confessed to murdering two other white men: John Cureton near Columbia in 1864 and Lemuel Lane (51) in Newberry County shortly after Walker's murder.) | James Lawrence Orr |
| Horace Greely | Black | 19 | M | March 1, 1867 | Charleston | Murder-Robbery | Benjamin Smith Rhett, 68, white | James Lawrence Orr |
| Robert Hodge | White | | M | June 7, 1867 | Richland | Murder-Robbery | Charles F. van Eaton, 33, white | James Lawrence Orr |
| Cyrus Coachman | Black | | M | June 18, 1869 | Darlington | Murder-Robbery | Robert P. Suggs, white | Robert Kingston Scott |
| Toby Lybrand | Black | | M | October 8, 1869 | Lexington | Murder | Louisa Long, black (girlfriend) | Robert Kingston Scott |

=== 1870s ===
| Name | Race | Age | Sex | Date of execution | County | Crime | Victim(s) | Governor |
|---|---|---|---|---|---|---|---|---|
| Paul Brown | Black | 20 | M | May 6, 1870 | Darlington | Murder-Robbery | John LeGrand Dickson, 65, white | Robert Kingston Scott |
| John Sweedenburg | Black | | M | November 8, 1870 | Newberry | Murder | Unknown, black (child) | Robert Kingston Scott |
| Lewis Berry | Black | 39 | M | November 8, 1870 | Newberry | Murder | Samuel H. Dunwoody, 48, white | Robert Kingston Scott |
| Ezekiel McAbee | White | 21 | M | November 18, 1870 | Spartanburg | Murder | Simon Latham, black | Robert Kingston Scott |
| Andy Hill | Black | | M | November 25, 1870 | Greenville | Murder | Thomas A. Holtzclaw, 33, white | Robert Kingston Scott |
| Andrew Brown | Black | | M | February 24, 1871 | Barnwell | Murder | Jacob Barton, black | Robert Kingston Scott |
| Henry Cannon | Black | 26 | M | April 21, 1871 | Union | Murder | George Mattison Stevens, white | Robert Kingston Scott |
| Taylor Palmer | Black | | M | April 21, 1871 | Union | Murder | George Mattison Stevens, white | Robert Kingston Scott |
| Edom Hammond | Black | 40 | M | May 19, 1871 | Lancaster | Murder | David Kirkpatrick, 54, white | Robert Kingston Scott |
| Henry Houston | Black | 24 | M | May 26, 1871 | Fairfield | Murder-Robbery | William Powell, black | Robert Kingston Scott |
| Shadrach Webster | Black | | M | July 21, 1871 | Anderson | Murder | Adeline Agnew, 21, black | Robert Kingston Scott |
| Andrew Doyle | Black | | M | August 18, 1871 | Colleton | Murder-Robbery | Daniel F. Driggers, 40, white | Robert Kingston Scott |
| Charles Mechanick | Black | 18 | M | August 18, 1871 | Colleton | Murder-Robbery | Daniel F. Driggers, 40, white | Robert Kingston Scott |
| Sam White | Black | 25 | M | February 2, 1872 | Charleston | Murder-Robbery | William B. Fiddia, 52, white | Robert Kingston Scott |
| Peter Culp | Black | 23 | M | March 22, 1872 | York | Murder | Lucinda Culp, 24, black (wife) | Robert Kingston Scott |
| Taylor Wilson | Black | 21 | M | April 5, 1872 | Sumter | Murder | Thomas Keith, 76, black | Robert Kingston Scott |
| Eli Chavis | White | 26 | M | August 2, 1872 | Barnwell | Murder | Adam Jackson, 40, black | Robert Kingston Scott |
| Edward Harris | Black | 44 | M | August 30, 1872 | Richland | Murder | Patrick Murphy, 65, white | Robert Kingston Scott |
| William Lucas | Black | 35 | M | August 30, 1872 | Richland | Murder | John Simpson, white | Robert Kingston Scott |
| Samuel Brown | Black | 39 | M | January 24, 1873 | Marion | Murder | Ebb West, 49, black (father-in-law) | Franklin J. Moses Jr. |
| Levi Souls | White | 22 | M | May 23, 1873 | Marion | Murder | Noah Sutton, 25, white | Franklin J. Moses Jr. |
| Samuel Vinson | Black | | M | March 27, 1874 | Sumter | Murder-Robbery | Henry Widekind, 29, white | Franklin J. Moses Jr. |
| Aaron Furman | Black | 44 | M | March 27, 1874 | Sumter | Murder-Robbery | Henry Widekind, 29, white | Franklin J. Moses Jr. |
| Samuel Banks | White | 23 | M | March 27, 1874 | Abbeville | Murder | Thomas Shedd, 40, white | Franklin J. Moses Jr. |
| Cambyses Hunter | Black | 30 | M | April 10, 1874 | Darlington | Murder | Cornelius Robinson, black | Franklin J. Moses Jr. |
| Daniel DeSaussure | Black | 24 | M | May 15, 1874 | Colleton | Murder | Annie Black, 16, black | Franklin J. Moses Jr. |
| William Auld | Black | 18 | M | April 2, 1875 | Orangeburg | Murder | Butler Goldson, black | Daniel Henry Chamberlain |
| Scipio Brown | Black | 40 | M | April 16, 1875 | Beaufort | Murder-Robbery-Arson | Thomas S. Behn, 65, white | Daniel Henry Chamberlain |
| Elijah Atkinson | Black | | M | April 16, 1875 | Beaufort | Murder-Robbery-Arson | Thomas S. Behn, 65, white | Daniel Henry Chamberlain |
| John Richardson | Black | 22 | M | April 30, 1875 | Colleton | Murder-Robbery | Constantine Bass, white | Daniel Henry Chamberlain |
| Josh Frazer | Black | 32 | M | May 14, 1875 | Kershaw | Murder | Benjamin Cooper, black | Daniel Henry Chamberlain |
| Kelly McDolan | Black | 34 | M | June 18, 1875 | Darlington | Murder | Jack Johnson, black | Daniel Henry Chamberlain |
| Oliver Spencer | Black | 29 | M | June 18, 1875 | Darlington | Murder | Mack Thomas, 39, black | Daniel Henry Chamberlain |
| Dennis Bunch | Black | 30 | M | June 25, 1875 | Charleston | Murder | John Donahue, 43, white (police officer) (Note: Bunch, also a police officer, had been reported for being drunk on the job and shot Donahue while being escorted back to the station.) | Daniel Henry Chamberlain |
| George Hardee | Black | | M | June 25, 1875 | Charleston | Murder | Staten Lanier, black | Daniel Henry Chamberlain |
| John Smith | Black | 20 | M | July 30, 1875 | Charleston | Murder-Robbery | James Garaty, 34, white | Daniel Henry Chamberlain |
| Alf Walker | Black | 35 | M | August 6, 1875 | Union | Murder-Robbery | J. Claudius Miller, 66, white | Daniel Henry Chamberlain |
| Stephen Young | Black | 28 | M | January 28, 1876 | Chester | Murder | George Mercer, 50+, black | Daniel Henry Chamberlain |
| W. R. Thompson | Black | 33 | M | March 10, 1876 | Newberry | Murder-Robbery | Hayne D. Reid, 35, white | Daniel Henry Chamberlain |
| William Alexander Lowry | Black | 21 | M | June 16, 1876 | Sumter | Murder-Robbery | John Murphy, 60+, white | Daniel Henry Chamberlain |
| Wesley Brooks | Black | 25 | M | July 14, 1876 | Barnwell | Murder | Male, black | Daniel Henry Chamberlain |
| John Snipes | Black | 24 | M | August 11, 1876 | Beaufort | Murder-Robbery | John H. Howard, 74, white | Daniel Henry Chamberlain |
| Jerry Coleman | Black | 36 | M | August 18, 1876 | Abbeville | Murder | Adam Hackett, black | Daniel Henry Chamberlain |
| Nelson Brown | Black | 38 | M | March 16, 1877 | Aiken | Murder-Burglary-Arson | Rudolph and Fritz Hausmann, 60 and 25, white | Daniel Henry Chamberlain |
| Lucius Thomas | Black | 22 | M | March 16, 1877 | Aiken | Murder-Burglary-Arson | Rudolph and Fritz Hausmann, 60 and 25, white | Daniel Henry Chamberlain |
| Adam Johnston | Black | 43 | M | March 16, 1877 | Aiken | Murder-Burglary-Arson | Rudolph and Fritz Hausmann, 60 and 25, white | Daniel Henry Chamberlain |
| John Henry Davis | Black | 30 | M | March 16, 1877 | Aiken | Murder-Burglary-Arson | Rudolph and Fritz Hausmann, 60 and 25, white | Daniel Henry Chamberlain |
| Steve Anderson | Black | 21 | M | April 20, 1877 | Aiken | Murder-Burglary-Arson | Rudolph and Fritz Hausmann, 60 and 25, white | Wade Hampton III |
| Wightman Allen | Black | | M | May 4, 1877 | Abbeville | Murder | Clayton Allen, 28, white | Wade Hampton III |
| John Allen | Black | 20 | M | May 4, 1877 | Abbeville | Murder | Clayton Allen, 28, white | Wade Hampton III |
| Jenkins Whitner | Black | | M | May 4, 1877 | Abbeville | Murder | Clayton Allen, 28, white | Wade Hampton III |
| Jack Burgoyne | Black | 30 | M | May 18, 1877 | Marion | Murder | Alexander Gregg, 45, white | Wade Hampton III |
| William Bradley | Black | 22 | M | July 13, 1877 | Barnwell | Murder | Hampton Ronken, black | Wade Hampton III |
| David Pearce | Black | 28 | M | July 13, 1877 | Charleston | Murder-Robbery | Joseph Evans Edings Jr., 18, white | Wade Hampton III |
| Gus Stevens | Black | 23 | M | July 13, 1877 | Charleston | Murder-Robbery | Joseph Evans Edings Jr., 18, white | Wade Hampton III |
| Cush Harris | Black | | M | August 31, 1877 | Edgefield | Murder-Burglary-Arson | Lewis Holloway, 56, white | Wade Hampton III |
| John Smith | Black | | M | February 1, 1878 | Chester | Murder-Robbery | Bergen Conger, 28, white | Wade Hampton III |
| Fortune Bush | Black | | M | March 22, 1878 | Barnwell | Murder | Enicks family, black (Note: Stephen Enicks (24), his wife Mary (22), and their two children (3 and 1).) | Wade Hampton III |
| Dexter McCreary | Black | | M | March 22, 1878 | Barnwell | Murder | Enicks family, black | Wade Hampton III |
| James McEvoy | Black | 22 | M | April 19, 1878 | Aiken | Murder | James Jones Gregg, 41, white | Wade Hampton III |
| Anthony McKay | Black | | M | May 3, 1878 | Darlington | Murder-Robbery | Robert P. Suggs, white | Wade Hampton III |
| Henry Wise | White | 30 | M | July 12, 1878 | Colleton | Murder | Fletcher Brown, 22, white | Wade Hampton III |
| Alex DeWitt | Black | | M | August 9, 1878 | Darlington | Murder | William Warren, white | Wade Hampton III |
| John Locklear | Native American | 32 | M | August 23, 1878 | Marlboro | Murder-Robbery | Frank Bryce, white | Wade Hampton III |
| Will Locklear | Native American | 26 | M | August 23, 1878 | Marlboro | Murder-Robbery | Frank Bryce, white | Wade Hampton III |
| Pompey Easterling | Black | | M | August 23, 1878 | Marlboro | Murder-Robbery | Frank Bryce, white | Wade Hampton III |
| Neill Blair | Black | | M | January 17, 1879 | Kershaw | Murder | William Adamson, 54, black | William Dunlap Simpson |
| Edward Holmes | Black | 16 | M | November 21, 1879 | Union | Rape | Mary Humphries, 6, white | William Dunlap Simpson |
| George Gary | Black | 22 | M | November 21, 1879 | Beaufort | Murder | Cyrus Brown, 34, black | William Dunlap Simpson |

=== 1880s ===
| Name | Race | Age | Sex | Date of execution | County | Crime | Victim(s) | Governor |
|---|---|---|---|---|---|---|---|---|
| Amos Wooten | Black | | M | April 9, 1880 | Marlboro | Arson-Robbery | James B. Breeden, 51, white | William Dunlap Simpson |
| William Bates | White | 27 | M | April 16, 1880 | Barnwell | Murder | Stephen W. Bush, white | William Dunlap Simpson |
| Alexander Williams | Black | | M | April 23, 1880 | Lexington | Murder | Smith Fields, black | William Dunlap Simpson |
| Thomas White | White | 28 | M | May 14, 1880 | Spartanburg | Murder | "Pet" Hawkins, 19, black | William Dunlap Simpson |
| Daniel Washington | Black | 37 | M | July 9, 1880 | Charleston | Murder | Allen Collins, 31, black | William Dunlap Simpson |
| Frank Magrath | Black | 27 | M | January 28, 1881 | Georgetown | Murder | Josie Smalls, 25, black | Johnson Hagood |
| James Black | Black | 21 | M | March 18, 1881 | Marion | Murder | Eli Wilcox, 20, black | Johnson Hagood |
| Abram Martin | Black | 50 | M | April 22, 1881 | Abbeville | Murder | Lucinda Martin, 48, black (wife) | Johnson Hagood |
| Joseph Stevens | Black | 48 | M | May 20, 1881 | Edgefield | Murder | Andrew Mobley, 41, black | Johnson Hagood |
| Benjamin James | Black | 22 | M | June 3, 1881 | Marion | Murder-Robbery | David Merriwether Harrell, 34, white | Johnson Hagood |
| Josh Munday | Black | 26 | M | August 26, 1881 | Edgefield | Murder | Julia Munday, 26, black (wife) | Johnson Hagood |
| Whitney Hicks | White | 30 | M | September 30, 1881 | Spartanburg | Murder | Mary Ann Clement Hicks, 34, white (wife) | Johnson Hagood |
| Henry Johnston | Black | 29 | M | November 25, 1881 | Sumter | Murder | John Davis, 51, black | Johnson Hagood |
| Richard James | Black | 31 | M | November 25, 1881 | Marion | Murder-Robbery | David Merriwether Harrell, 34, white | Johnson Hagood |
| Gabriel White | Black | 25 | M | December 30, 1881 | Colleton | Murder | Frederick Bellinger, 26, black | Johnson Hagood |
| Jesse Barber | Black | 30 | M | February 10, 1882 | Fairfield | Murder | Mack Perry, 57, black | Johnson Hagood |
| Pleasant Adams | Black | 18 | M | April 28, 1882 | Greenville | Arson-Robbery | N/A (Note: Burned the Greenville Academy of Music.) | Johnson Hagood |
| Richard Bates | Black | 19 | M | April 28, 1882 | Greenville | Arson-Robbery | N/A | Johnson Hagood |
| Joe Burton | Black | 24 | M | April 28, 1882 | Greenville | Arson-Robbery | N/A | Johnson Hagood |
| Abraham Singletary | Black | 32 | M | June 23, 1882 | Williamsburg | Arson-Robbery | Thomas D. Brockington, 29, white | Johnson Hagood |
| Boston Singletary | Black | 17 | M | June 23, 1882 | Williamsburg | Arson-Robbery | Thomas D. Brockington, 29, white | Johnson Hagood |
| Anderson Singleton | Black | 24 | M | June 23, 1882 | Williamsburg | Murder | Phoebe Teasdale, 19, black | Johnson Hagood |
| Lucinda Teasdale | Black | 23 | F | June 23, 1882 | Williamsburg | Murder | Phoebe Teasdale, 19, black | Johnson Hagood |
| Robert Parker | White | 22 | M | August 25, 1882 | Aiken | Murder | Caroline Parker, 39, white (wife) | Johnson Hagood |
| Moses Lockhart | Black | 23 | M | December 1, 1882 | Edgefield | Murder | Mose Blalock, 32, black | Johnson Hagood |
| Oliver Bristow | Black | | M | March 30, 1883 | Kershaw | Murder | Frank M. McDowall, white | Hugh Smith Thompson |
| Frazier Copeland | Black | 42 | M | April 27, 1883 | Oconee | Murder-Robbery | William John Hunnicutt and his son, 50 and 10, white | Hugh Smith Thompson |
| Solomon Hewitt | Black | 28 | M | June 15, 1883 | Horry | Murder-Robbery | Jeremiah Stalvey, 64, white | Hugh Smith Thompson |
| Will Hardee | Black | 24 | M | June 15, 1883 | Horry | Murder-Robbery | Jeremiah Stalvey, 64, white | Hugh Smith Thompson |
| Ben Perry | Black | 33 | M | August 17, 1883 | Greenville | Murder | Perry Anderson, 33, black | Hugh Smith Thompson |
| Jerry Cox | Black | 30 | M | December 21, 1883 | Georgetown | Murder-Robbery | Herbert H. Rembert, 24, white | Hugh Smith Thompson |
| Isaac Anderson | Black | | M | January 11, 1884 | Barnwell | Murder | Owen Williams, 38, white | Hugh Smith Thompson |
| Joe Howard | Black | 35 | M | March 28, 1884 | Sumter | Murder | Simon Gaskins, black (stepson-in-law) | Hugh Smith Thompson |
| James Coleman | Black | 26 | M | May 9, 1884 | Richland | Murder-Rape | Sarah Willis and Mattie Faust, both 23, black (sisters-in-law) (Note: Willis murdered and Faust raped.) | Hugh Smith Thompson |
| Riley Anderson | Black | | M | May 16, 1884 | Greenville | Murder | Lon Griffiths, white | Hugh Smith Thompson |
| James McCullough | Black | 22 | M | May 16, 1884 | Greenville | Murder | Ephraim Saxon, 19, black | Hugh Smith Thompson |
| Alfred McCullough | Black | 45 | M | May 16, 1884 | Greenville | Murder | Ephraim Saxon, 19, black | Hugh Smith Thompson |
| William Trezevant | Black | 31 | M | June 7, 1884 | Orangeburg | Murder | Frank Mitchell, 20, black | Hugh Smith Thompson |
| William Stevens | Black | 18 | M | August 1, 1884 | Edgefield | Murder-Robbery | Henry S. Steifer, 50+, white | Hugh Smith Thompson |
| John Nesmith | Black | 24 | M | December 5, 1884 | Berkeley | Murder | James J. Schipmann, 36, white (special deputy) | Hugh Smith Thompson |
| Columbus Crawford | Black | 49 | M | April 10, 1885 | York | Murder | Ellison Sanders, 22, black | Hugh Smith Thompson |
| Richard Fraser | Black | 25 | M | April 10, 1885 | Charleston | Murder-Robbery | Jack Githers, black | Hugh Smith Thompson |
| Hamp Nethers | Black | 35 | M | April 24, 1885 | Union | Murder | Adolphus Abrams, 17, black | Hugh Smith Thompson |
| John Terry | Black | 26 | M | May 29, 1885 | Barnwell | Murder | John G. Sessions, 40, white | Hugh Smith Thompson |
| Jenkins Wright | Black | 23 | M | July 2, 1886 | Hampton | Murder | Charlotte Wright, 25, black (wife) | John Calhoun Sheppard |
| Edward Bundy | Black | 22 | M | August 7, 1886 | Spartanburg | Murder | Mary Annie Isabella Shiver, 40, white | John Calhoun Sheppard |
| Wright Weldon | Black | 31 | M | October 8, 1886 | Edgefield | Murder-Robbery | John W. Lagrone, 35, white | John Calhoun Sheppard |
| Bob Jeter | Black | 17 | M | December 17, 1886 | Spartanburg | Murder | Hampton Littlefield, white | John Peter Richardson III |
| Lewis Stewart | Black | 33 | M | April 1, 1887 | Laurens | Murder | Frances Stewart, 26, black | John Peter Richardson III |
| Sol Conyears | Black | 30 | M | August 12, 1887 | Hampton | Murder | Jordan Robinson, 32, black | John Peter Richardson III |
| Talton Danzy | Black | 38 | M | August 26, 1887 | Kershaw | Murder | Noel Perkins, 18, black | John Peter Richardson III |
| Jake Nimons | Black | | M | December 2, 1887 | Berkeley | Murder-Robbery | Michael Plotkin, 25, white | John Peter Richardson III |
| John Strickland | White | 20 | M | December 30, 1887 | Horry | Murder | Adeline D. Strickland, white (stepmother) | John Peter Richardson III |
| Prophet Frazier | Black | | M | April 6, 1888 | Colleton | Murder | Viney Frazier, black (wife) (Note: Pregnant when murdered.) | John Peter Richardson III |
| Jasper Davis | White | 44 | M | April 27, 1888 | Anderson | Murder | Mary Moore Davis, 42, white (wife) | John Peter Richardson III |
| Jack Prater | Black | 32 | M | April 27, 1888 | Orangeburg | Murder | Andrew Jackson, black | John Peter Richardson III |
| Dock Morgan | Black | 19 | M | September 14, 1888 | Marlboro | Murder | William N. Coxe, 18, white | John Peter Richardson III |
| Ephraim Mays | Black | 19 | M | October 26, 1888 | Edgefield | Murder | Jake Burt, 37, black | John Peter Richardson III |
| James Wood | Black | | M | November 30, 1888 | Aiken | Murder | Robert Ollie, 37, black | John Peter Richardson III |
| Adolphus Wheeler | Black | 29 | M | December 7, 1888 | York | Murder | George Beckham, 23, black | John Peter Richardson III |
| Samuel Phifer | Black | 28 | M | December 7, 1888 | York | Murder | Lucy Smith, 19, black (stepdaughter) | John Peter Richardson III |
| Emanuel Gaskin | Black | 23 | M | March 8, 1889 | Kershaw | Murder-Rape | Betsy Clark, black | John Peter Richardson III |
| Jack Givens | Black | | M | April 5, 1889 | Colleton | Murder | Della Givens, black (wife) | John Peter Richardson III |
| James R. McLaurin | Black | 16 | M | April 26, 1889 | Marlboro | Rape | Annie Jane McLaurin, 15, white | John Peter Richardson III |
| Caesar Frazier | Black | 22 | M | April 26, 1889 | Charleston | Murder-Robbery | Eide Henry Oldenburg, 60, white | John Peter Richardson III |
| Charles Colston | Black | | M | June 7, 1889 | York | Murder-Robbery | William Calhoun Abernathy, 39, white | John Peter Richardson III |
| John Henry Williams | Black | 34 | M | June 7, 1889 | York | Murder-Robbery | William Calhoun Abernathy, 39, white | John Peter Richardson III |

=== 1890s ===
| Name | Race | Age | Sex | Date of execution | County | Crime | Victim(s) | Governor |
|---|---|---|---|---|---|---|---|---|
| Charles Simmons | Black | 18 | M | April 11, 1890 | Berkeley | Murder-Robbery | Otto Fischang, 50+, white | John Peter Richardson III |
| William Davis | Black | 28 | M | May 9, 1890 | Union | Murder-Robbery | Susie Fernandez, black | John Peter Richardson III |
| Armstead Jones | Black | 16 | M | July 12, 1890 | Orangeburg | Murder | Margaret Jones, black (stepmother) | John Peter Richardson III |
| Rochel Catoe | Mixed (Note: Mulatto.) | 27 | M | August 1, 1890 | Lancaster | Murder | Gustavus Hennis, white (Catoe's girlfriend's husband) | John Peter Richardson III |
| William Clyburn | Black | 19 | M | August 1, 1890 | Lancaster | Murder | Gustavus Hennis, white (Catoe's girlfriend's husband) | John Peter Richardson III |
| Robert Shelton | Black | 45 | M | September 5, 1890 | Laurens | Murder | William Rayford, black | John Peter Richardson III |
| Adam Mongin | Black | 21 | M | December 19, 1890 | Berkeley | Murder | Simon Jackson, 27, black | Benjamin Tillman |
| Cantry Butler | Black | 26 | M | April 10, 1891 | Sumter | Murder | John Maxcy, white | Benjamin Tillman |
| Hampton Nelson | Black | 32 | M | April 10, 1891 | Sumter | Murder | John Maxcy, white | Benjamin Tillman |
| Walker Brown | Black | 21 | M | April 17, 1891 | Laurens | Murder | Noah Ramage, 24, black | Benjamin Tillman |
| Edmund Holloway | Black | 37 | M | April 24, 1891 | Clarendon | Murder | John W. duBose, 44, white | Benjamin Tillman |
| Bill Miles | Black | | M | April 24, 1891 | Pickens | Murder | Jacob Griffin, 42, black | Benjamin Tillman |
| Waite Martin | Black | | M | April 24, 1891 | Richland | Murder | Alice McLeod, 30, white (girlfriend) | Benjamin Tillman |
| William Somerset | Black | 28 | M | November 13, 1891 | Marion | Murder | Edward M. Fore, 35, white | Benjamin Tillman |
| John W. Patterson | Black | | M | November 20, 1891 | Horry | Murder | Henry Cornelius Hardee, 34, white (magistrate's constable) | Benjamin Tillman |
| Van Thomas | Black | 32 | M | March 4, 1892 | Abbeville | Murder-Robbery | John Brackett, black (Note: Also confessed to murdering another black man, Ephraim Laddis, at Chester in 1889.) | Benjamin Tillman |
| Thomas Hamilton | Black | 25 | M | April 22, 1892 | Charleston | Murder-Burglary | Henry Massalon, white | Benjamin Tillman |
| Julius Wise | Black | 36 | M | July 29, 1892 | Lexington | Murder | Willis Stark, black | Benjamin Tillman |
| Charles Williams | Black | | M | August 5, 1892 | Hampton | Murder | Silas Bryant, black | Benjamin Tillman |
| Adam Foster | Black | 23 | M | September 7, 1892 | Spartanburg | Murder | Mayberry Sanders, black | Benjamin Tillman |
| Andy Jeffries | Black | 23 | M | September 7, 1892 | Spartanburg | Murder | William Atkins, white | Benjamin Tillman |
| Milbry Brown | Black | 14 | F | October 7, 1892 | Spartanburg | Murder | Geraldine Carpenter, 11 months, white | Benjamin Tillman |
| John Williams | Black | | M | October 7, 1892 | Spartanburg | Murder | John Adam Henneman, 55, white (mayor of Spartanburg) | Benjamin Tillman |
| Anna Tribble | Black | 23 | F | October 7, 1892 | Newberry | Murder | Unknown, newborn, black (child) | Benjamin Tillman |
| William Wilson | White | 34 | M | October 7, 1892 | Anderson | Murder | Laura Garrett Wilson, 29, white (wife) | Benjamin Tillman |
| Tom Brock | Black | 20 | M | October 7, 1892 | Pickens | Murder | Jeremiah Hughes, 38, white (Easley town marshal) (Note: Mistaken for another black man with whom he was feuding over "the affection of a young woman.") | Benjamin Tillman |
| Joseph Jenkins | Black | 20 | M | December 16, 1892 | Berkeley | Murder-Robbery | John Morgan, 62, white | Benjamin Tillman |
| Toby Jackson | Black | 59 | M | December 30, 1892 | Orangeburg | Murder | Nelson Hook, 29, black | Benjamin Tillman |
| Henry Perry | Black | 21 | M | April 14, 1893 | Marlboro | Murder | L. D. Taylor, white | Benjamin Tillman |
| Wade Haynes | Black | 15 | M | May 5, 1893 | Richland | Murder-Rape | Florence Hornsby, 16, white | Benjamin Tillman |
| Joe Brannon | Black | 19 | M | May 12, 1893 | Chester | Murder | Stephen Kearney, 72, white | Benjamin Tillman |
| Jerry Hennegan | Black | 27 | M | July 7, 1893 | Marlboro | Murder | Elisha D. Graham, 32, white | Benjamin Tillman |
| Adam Hiers | Black | | M | July 28, 1893 | Colleton | Murder | Mr. Walker, black (brother-in-law) | Benjamin Tillman |
| George Turner | White | 39 | M | September 1, 1893 | Spartanburg | Murder | Edgar Finger, 28, white (brother-in-law) (Note: Previously murdered his German farmhand Julius Metzkia in 1887 and sentenced to 5 years for manslaughter, but conviction thrown out on appeal. Also a Ku Klux Klan member from 1867 to 1870.) | Benjamin Tillman |
| George Ferguson | Black | 24 | M | September 1, 1893 | Laurens | Murder | Emma Ferguson, black (wife) | Benjamin Tillman |
| Jim Bowers | Black | | M | September 1, 1893 | Laurens | Arson-Burglary | John Dorrah Hairston, 42, white | Benjamin Tillman |
| William Cannon | Black | | M | September 1, 1893 | Laurens | Arson-Burglary | John Dorrah Hairston, 42, white | Benjamin Tillman |
| Oscar Johnson | Black | 29 | M | September 1, 1893 | Berkeley | Murder-Robbery | Heinrich Wilhelm and Anna Rebecca Catherine Ronner Tweitmann, 29 and 34, white (Note: Asylum escapee from Georgia, where he was serving a life term for the rape and murder of Lucinda Sims (18, black) in 1890.) | Benjamin Tillman |
| Henry Ewing | Black | 30 | M | September 1, 1893 | Berkeley | Murder | Tony Fickling, 35, black | Benjamin Tillman |
| Gabriel Graves | Black | 32 | M | January 26, 1894 | Colleton | Murder-Burglary | Frank Thompson, 13, white | Benjamin Tillman |
| Jerry Horlbeck | Black | 35 | M | March 15, 1894 | Berkeley | Murder | Robert Hasell, black (constable) | Benjamin Tillman |
| Alexander Edwards | Black | 33 | M | April 20, 1894 | Marlboro | Murder-Robbery | James Burnett, black | Benjamin Tillman |
| Moses Fair | Black | 27 | M | May 4, 1894 | Chester | Murder | Isaac Wilson, black | Benjamin Tillman |
| John Morgan | White | 35 | M | June 1, 1894 | Greenville | Murder | LeRoy Washington Hipp, 62, white (father-in-law) | Benjamin Tillman |
| Dick Graham | Black | 48 | M | July 27, 1894 | Berkeley | Murder | Nancy Drayton, 40, black (girlfriend) | Benjamin Tillman |
| John Atkinson | White | 50+ | M | September 21, 1894 | Fairfield | Murder | John H. Clamp, 32, white | Benjamin Tillman |
| Jasper Atkinson | White | 22 | M | September 21, 1894 | Fairfield | Murder | John H. Clamp, 32, white | Benjamin Tillman |
| Sloan Hearst | Black | 37 | M | April 26, 1895 | Abbeville | Murder | Lemmie Rapley, 34, black | John Gary Evans |
| Bob Poole | Black | | M | September 20, 1895 | Spartanburg | Murder | William Long, black | John Gary Evans |
| Charles Lloyd | Black | | M | December 6, 1895 | Chester (Note: Change of venue from Lancaster County.) | Murder | William B. Welsh, 17, white | John Gary Evans |
| Tom Peterson | Black | 30 | M | December 6, 1895 | Abbeville | Murder | Johnson J. Moseley, 47, white (state prohibition agent) | John Gary Evans |
| Jason Black | Black | 20 | M | December 6, 1895 | Hampton | Murder-Robbery | Eldred Raymond Mears, 72, white (postmaster) | John Gary Evans |
| William Frazier | Black | 20 | M | December 6, 1895 | Hampton | Murder-Robbery | Eldred Raymond Mears, 72, white (postmaster) | John Gary Evans |
| Prince Graham | Black | 25 | M | December 6, 1895 | Hampton | Murder-Robbery | Eldred Raymond Mears, 72, white (postmaster) | John Gary Evans |
| Walker Derrick | Black | | M | December 13, 1895 | Abbeville | Murder | Sam Robertson, black | John Gary Evans |
| James Sanders | Black | 16 | M | January 3, 1896 | Barnwell | Murder | Simon Riley, 62, black (wife's stepfather) | John Gary Evans |
| Richard Washington | Black | 28 | M | March 27, 1896 | Abbeville | Murder-Robbery | Narcissa Bagwell, 32, white (girlfriend) | John Gary Evans |
| Aaron Duffie | Black | | M | September 4, 1896 | Newberry | Murder | James Solomon Hargrove, 20, white (guard) | John Gary Evans |
| Tourney Lyles | Black | 18 | M | August 20, 1897 | Newberry | Rape | Jane Willard, 65, white | William Haselden Ellerbe |
| George Green | Black | | M | October 15, 1897 | Beaufort | Mirder | Sam Deas, black | William Haselden Ellerbe |
| John Wright | Black | 33 | M | December 10, 1897 | Darlington | Murder | Clarence L. Byrd, 20, white | William Haselden Ellerbe |
| John Butler | Black | 22 | M | February 11, 1898 | Orangeburg | Murder | Christian J. D. Wolfe, 52, white (Orangeburg police chief) | William Haselden Ellerbe |
| Rion William Johnson | Black | | M | February 25, 1898 | Beaufort | Murder | Mr. Robertson, black | William Haselden Ellerbe |
| Jefferson Habersham | Black | | M | February 25, 1898 | Beaufort | Murder | Laura Williams, black (girlfriend) | William Haselden Ellerbe |
| Nathan Willis | Black | 24 | M | March 25, 1898 | Horry | Murder-Robbery | Samuel J. Stevens, 20, white | William Haselden Ellerbe |
| Jim Anderson | Black | 25 | M | April 15, 1898 | Chester | Murder | James K. Marshall, 54, white (Chester police officer) | William Haselden Ellerbe |
| Christopher Cannon | Black | 17 | M | August 19, 1898 | Spartanburg | Murder-Burglary | John H. Blassingame, 64, white | William Haselden Ellerbe |
| Jesse Hill | Black | 21 | M | November 18, 1898 | Lexington | Murder-Robbery | Mary Lybrand, 60+, white | William Haselden Ellerbe |
| Matthew Moseley | Black | 24 | M | December 2, 1898 | Orangeburg | Murder | Andrew McMillan, black | William Haselden Ellerbe |
| John Harper | Black | 30 | M | December 16, 1898 | Chesterfield | Murder | John Alexander Campbell, 66, white | William Haselden Ellerbe |
| Frank Castles | Black | 32 | M | January 6, 1899 | York | Murder | Ben Goore, 50+, black | William Haselden Ellerbe |
| Amzi Dunnovant | Black | 35 | M | January 6, 1899 | York | Murder | Ben Goore, 50+, black | William Haselden Ellerbe |
| Scipio Rhame | Black | 26 | M | May 5, 1899 | Clarendon | Murder | Ellerson Butler, black | William Haselden Ellerbe |
| James Phelps | Black | 30 | M | August 4, 1899 | Charleston | Murder | John Joseph Bean, 25, white (police officer) | Miles Benjamin McSweeney |
| Sam Bailey | Black | | M | August 4, 1899 | Charleston | Murder | Arthur Duncan, black | Miles Benjamin McSweeney |
| Ed Lucky | Black | 20 | M | November 24, 1899 | Darlington | Rape | Josephine Lafferty, 23, white | Miles Benjamin McSweeney |
| Tom Mitchell | Black | 20 | M | November 24, 1899 | Darlington | Rape | Josephine Lafferty, 23, white | Miles Benjamin McSweeney |

=== 1900s ===
| Name | Race | Age | Sex | Date of execution | County | Crime | Victim(s) | Governor |
|---|---|---|---|---|---|---|---|---|
| Charley Wilson | Black | 21 | M | January 5, 1900 | Charleston | Murder | Theodore P. Godfrey, 28, white | Miles Benjamin McSweeney |
| Zachariah Singleton | Black | 20 | M | January 5, 1900 | Charleston | Murder | Christopher Bennett, 19, black | Miles Benjamin McSweeney |
| Hamilton McGill | Black | 22 | M | June 15, 1900 | Williamsburg | Rape | Colee Eaddy, 9, white | Miles Benjamin McSweeney |
| Warby Wine | Black | 28 | M | October 26, 1900 | Orangeburg | Murder-Robbery | Hamp H. Paulling, 24, white | Miles Benjamin McSweeney |
| James Kelley | Black | 16 | M | January 4, 1901 | Charleston | Murder-Robbery | Willis Bonneau, 60, black | Miles Benjamin McSweeney |
| George Thomas | Black | 50 | M | February 15, 1901 | Beaufort | Rape | Rosa Brabham Douberly, 17, white | Miles Benjamin McSweeney |
| Alfred Jacobs | Black | 18 | M | April 26, 1901 | Darlington | Murder | John L. Byrd, 40, white | Miles Benjamin McSweeney |
| Jim Harris | Black | 22 | M | August 9, 1901 | Marlboro | Murder | Amos Carter, 63, white (chain gang superintendent) | Miles Benjamin McSweeney |
| Oliver Greer | Black | 20 | M | March 14, 1902 | Anderson | Rape | Rebecca Ann Kelly, 65, white | Miles Benjamin McSweeney |
| Julius Gibbes | Black | 41 | M | April 25, 1902 | Florence | Rape | Daisy Lee Haynes, 15, white | Miles Benjamin McSweeney |
| Joseph Keenan | Black | 42 | M | February 27, 1903 | Greenville | Murder-Burglary | Samuel Willimon, 48, white | Duncan Clinch Heyward |
| Winter Cantey | Black | 53 | M | May 29, 1903 | Richland | Murder | Eliza Kershaw, 23, black (love interest) | Duncan Clinch Heyward |
| Brown Badger | Black | | M | November 13, 1903 | Union | Murder | John Roger Fant, 30, white | Duncan Clinch Heyward |
| Henry Jones | Black | | M | August 26, 1904 | Pickens | Murder | Columbus T. Jones, 24, white (magistrate's constable) | Duncan Clinch Heyward |
| Will Hardin | Black | 28 | M | December 16, 1904 | Chester | Murder | Henry Sanders, 69, black (father-in-law) | Duncan Clinch Heyward |
| Marion Parr | White | 28 | M | April 14, 1905 | Richland | Murder-Robbery | Clarence Lafayette Shealy, 15, white | Duncan Clinch Heyward |
| Edward Mackey | Black | 24 | M | April 28, 1905 | Clarendon | Murder | Dave Connors, 51, black (stepfather-in-law) | Duncan Clinch Heyward |
| Willie Johnson | Black | 17 | M | June 16, 1905 | Orangeburg | Rape | Geneva H. Howell, 8, white | Duncan Clinch Heyward |
| Fletcher Byrd | Black | | M | November 10, 1905 | Greenville | Murder | William J. Cox, 47, white (magistrate) | Duncan Clinch Heyward |
| Jenkins Burrows | Black | | M | January 13, 1906 | Williamsburg | Murder-Robbery | Julian Wilson, 57, white | Duncan Clinch Heyward |
| Arthur Williams | Black | 19 | M | January 13, 1906 | Williamsburg | Murder-Robbery | Julian Wilson, 57, white | Duncan Clinch Heyward |
| Robert Scott | Black | | M | February 16, 1906 | Williamsburg | Murder-Robbery | Julian Wilson, 57, white | Duncan Clinch Heyward |
| Andrew Thompson | Black | 38 | M | March 2, 1906 | Greenville | Rape | Lilly Duncan James, 21, white | Duncan Clinch Heyward |
| Colclough Stukes | Black | 26 | M | May 18, 1906 | Sumter | Murder | David E. Wells, 42, white | Duncan Clinch Heyward |
| Arthur McFadden | Black | 25 | M | May 25, 1906 | Williamsburg | Murder | George Burgess, 22, black | Duncan Clinch Heyward |
| Epps Snowden | Black | 22 | M | May 25, 1906 | Williamsburg | Murder | Bob W. Brown, 37, black | Duncan Clinch Heyward |
| William Marcus | White | 41 | M | August 3, 1906 | Charleston | Murder | Maggie Stone Marcus, 48, white (wife) | Duncan Clinch Heyward |
| Luke Gray | Black | 23 | M | August 31, 1906 | Aiken | Murder | Clifford Woodward, 27, white | Duncan Clinch Heyward |
| Richard Dargan | Black | 21 | M | October 19, 1906 | Marlboro | Rape | Lucy Ann Patterson, 32, white | Duncan Clinch Heyward |
| Commander Johnson | White | 26 | M | October 19, 1906 | Horry | Murder | Harmon D. Grainger, 52, white | Duncan Clinch Heyward |
| Isaac Johnson | Black | 24 | M | October 26, 1906 | Aiken | Rape | Ellen S. Chapin, 56, white | Duncan Clinch Heyward |
| William Bennett | Black | | M | November 2, 1906 | Beaufort | Murder | George M. Harvey, 72, white | Duncan Clinch Heyward |
| Thomas Harris | White | 29 | M | March 29, 1907 | Cherokee | Murder-Burglary | Hortensia Morgan, 62, white | Martin Frederick Ansel |
| Joe Evans | Black | 20 | M | April 12, 1907 | Greenwood | Murder | William Hughey, 30, black (brother-in-law) | Martin Frederick Ansel |
| John Shelton | Black | 24 | M | May 3, 1907 | Spartanburg | Murder | Alfred Briggs, black (father-in-law) | Martin Frederick Ansel |
| George Kenny | Black | 19 | M | January 18, 1908 | Charleston | Murder | Herman G. Stello, 56, white | Martin Frederick Ansel |
| Jack Blake | Black | 28 | M | March 27, 1908 | Georgetown | Murder | James Green, 41, black (police constable) | Martin Frederick Ansel |
| Ned Toland | Black | 20 | M | May 1, 1908 | Lexington | Murder-Burglary | Frances M. Ellisor, 52, white | Martin Frederick Ansel |
| Tad Toland | Black | 17 | M | May 1, 1908 | Lexington | Murder-Burglary | Frances M. Ellisor, 52, white | Martin Frederick Ansel |
| Gaddy Graham | Black | 30 | M | May 1, 1908 | Darlington | Murder | Furman Moody, 36, white | Martin Frederick Ansel |
| Thomas Washington | Black | 27 | M | May 8, 1908 | Colleton | Murder | Frank Richardson, 34, black | Martin Frederick Ansel |
| Jim Malloy | Black | 30 | M | May 22, 1908 | Marlboro | Murder | Minnie Malloy, 19, black (wife) | Martin Frederick Ansel |
| John Wesley Shedd | Black | | M | July 17, 1908 | Fairfield | Murder | George Lawhone and Alice White, 20 (Lawhone), black | Martin Frederick Ansel |
| Lawrence Hampton | Black | 21 | M | October 16, 1908 | Greenwood | Murder | Robert White, 19, black | Martin Frederick Ansel |
| Elliott Greene | Black | 21 | M | October 16, 1908 | Barnwell | Murder | Oliver Smalls, 21, black | Martin Frederick Ansel |
| Robert Starke Means | Black | 18 | M | October 23, 1908 | Fairfield | Murder | Anna Belle Russell, 22, black (girlfriend) | Martin Frederick Ansel |
| Will Herring | Black | 30 | M | November 27, 1908 | Saluda | Murder | Emanuel Carver, 30, white | Martin Frederick Ansel |
| Jeff Clarke | Mixed (Note: Mulatto.) | 21 | M | January 15, 1909 | Berkeley | Murder | Calvin W. Clarke, 67, white (father) | Martin Frederick Ansel |
| Will Foster | Black | | M | February 5, 1909 | Spartanburg | Murder-Robbery | John Young, 52, white | Martin Frederick Ansel |
| Dan Robertson | Black | | M | April 23, 1909 | Hampton | Murder | Eliza Hunter, black (girlfriend) | Martin Frederick Ansel |
| Lawson Addison | Black | 22 | M | April 23, 1909 | Chester | Murder | Matilda McMaster (love interest) and Mamie Halsell, 31 (McMaster), black | Martin Frederick Ansel |
| Willie Carter | Black | 30 | M | April 30, 1909 | Bamberg | Murder | Shellie Raysor, 27, black | Martin Frederick Ansel |
| Love Robinson | Black | 15 | M | May 14, 1909 | York | Murder | Lena Watson, 13, black | Martin Frederick Ansel |
| Marshall Washington | Black | 24 | M | July 30, 1909 | Greenwood | Murder | Ola Williams, 20, black (girlfriend) | Martin Frederick Ansel |
| John Jenkins | Black | 52 | M | August 13, 1909 | Georgetown | Attempted rape | Female, 18, white | Martin Frederick Ansel |
| Melvin Watson | Black | 25 | M | November 12, 1909 | Horry | Murder | John B. Watson, 21, white | Martin Frederick Ansel |

=== 1910s ===
| Name | Race | Age | Sex | Date of execution | County | Crime | Victim(s) | Governor |
|---|---|---|---|---|---|---|---|---|
| John Rose | Black | 19 | M | February 4, 1910 | Williamsburg | Attempted rape | Female, 14, white | Martin Frederick Ansel |
| Coot Lever | Black | 27 | M | February 25, 1910 | Lexington | Attempted rape | Female, white | Martin Frederick Ansel |
| Haas Butler | Black | | M | April 8, 1910 | Pickens | Attempted rape | Female, 21, white | Martin Frederick Ansel |
| Allen Davis | Black | 22 | M | July 1, 1910 | Orangeburg | Murder | Leila Davis, black (wife) | Martin Frederick Ansel |
| Bunk Sherrard | Black | 30 | M | October 7, 1910 | Greenville | Murder | Edgar Cleveland Waldrop, 24, white (special police officer) | Martin Frederick Ansel |
| Clarence Ham | Black | 25 | M | December 14, 1910 | Florence | Murder-Burglary | Elihu M. Moye, 53, white | Martin Frederick Ansel |
| William Kelley | Black | 30 | M | December 23, 1910 | Berkeley | Murder | Archie Smalls, 20, black | Martin Frederick Ansel |
| James Edwards | Black | 24 | M | December 23, 1910 | Berkeley | Murder | Rebecca Edwards, 19, black (wife) | Martin Frederick Ansel |
| Minus Hightower | Black | 19 | M | December 23, 1910 | Richland | Rape | Meta P. McDonald, 27, white | Martin Frederick Ansel |
| Milton Kiser | Black | | M | January 7, 1911 | Kershaw | Murder | John Cook, 42, white (jail superintendent) | Martin Frederick Ansel |
| Gary Gist | Black | 19 | M | May 26, 1911 | Spartanburg | Rape | Annie West Anderson, 27, white | Cole L. Blease |
| Daniel Duncan | Black | 24 | M | July 7, 1911 | Charleston | Murder-Robbery | Max Lubelsky, 35, white | Cole L. Blease |
| Henry Kee | Black | 42 | M | December 20, 1911 | Lancaster | Murder | Sam Dye, 48, black | Cole L. Blease |
| Wade Hood | Black | 44 | M | December 20, 1911 | Lancaster | Murder | Walker Dunlap, 19, black | Cole L. Blease |

== Electrocution ==
In March 1912, local hangings were officially replaced with centralized electrocution, with the first electrocution being carried out that August at the state penitentiary in Columbia.

| Name | Race | Age | Sex | Date of execution | County | Crime | Victim(s) | Governor |
|---|---|---|---|---|---|---|---|---|
| William Reed | Black | 24 | M | August 6, 1912 | Anderson | Attempted rape-Burglary | Female, 26, white | Cole L. Blease |
| Alex Weldon | Black | 55 | M | August 13, 1912 | Florence | Murder-Robbery | Elihu M. Moye, 53, white | Cole L. Blease |
| John Cole | Black | 39 | M | August 22, 1912 | Charleston | Murder-Burglary | Sam Fraser, 22, black | Cole L. Blease |
| Edward Alexander | Black | 23 | M | September 20, 1912 | Fairfield | Attempted rape-Burglary | Female, white | Cole L. Blease |
| Samuel Hyde | White | 27 | M | October 1, 1912 | Anderson | Murder | Emma Beasley Hyde and William V. Beasley, 22 and 54, white (wife and father-in-law) | Cole L. Blease |
| Clinton Glover | Black | 19 | M | November 12, 1912 | Dorchester | Attempted rape-Burglary | Female, white | Cole L. Blease |
| Sam Boozer | Black | 42 | M | January 2, 1913 | Newberry | Murder | James S. Gilliam, 43, white | Cole L. Blease |
| Frank Green | Black | 18 | M | April 4, 1913 | Marlboro | Attempted rape | Female, 14, white | Cole L. Blease |
| Charles Rushing | White | 40 | M | April 18, 1913 | Chesterfield | Murder | Sue Rushing, 40, white (wife) | Cole L. Blease |
| Sam Dukes | Black | 25 | M | July 1, 1913 | Sumter | Murder | Isadore Barwick, 24, white (Pinewood police officer) | Cole L. Blease |
| M. L. Garrett | White | 48 | M | July 14, 1913 | Lee | Murder | Aaron Campbell and John H. Campbell, 19 and 52, white (nephew- and son-in-law) | Cole L. Blease |
| Herman Kelley | Black | 23 | M | August 8, 1913 | Florence | Attempted rape-Burglary | Female, white | Cole L. Blease |
| Ernest Mullivee | Black | 21 | M | August 18, 1913 | Oconee | Murder | Samuel Hyde, 27, white | Cole L. Blease |
| David Reynolds | Black | | M | September 4, 1913 | Beaufort | Murder | James Rollin Coller, 37, white (constable) | Cole L. Blease |
| Jasper Green | Black | 40 | M | September 4, 1913 | Beaufort | Murder | James Rollin Coller, 37, white (constable) | Cole L. Blease |
| Scott Madison | Black | 24 | M | December 22, 1913 | Barnwell | Murder | Edward Peyton Best, 35, white | Cole L. Blease |
| Albert Canty | Black | 27 | M | January 3, 1914 | Charleston | Murder | Alfred W. Steeger, 48, white | Cole L. Blease |
| Harry Thompson | Black | 17 | M | January 3, 1914 | Charleston | Murder | Alfred W. Steeger, 48, white | Cole L. Blease |
| Buck Hill | Black | 25 | M | February 9, 1914 | Richland | Rape | Female, 35, white | Cole L. Blease |
| Floyd McCullum | Black | 24 | M | February 6, 1915 | Pickens | Murder-Rape | Mr. and Mrs. James L. Hendricks, 55 and 54, white (Note: Mr. Hendricks murdered, Mrs. Hendricks raped. Unknown if charges tried separately.) | Richard Irvine Manning III |
| Durant Haile | Black | 26 | M | March 17, 1915 | Kershaw | Murder | Lucille Haile, 23, black (wife) | Richard Irvine Manning III |
| Tommie Grice | Black | 17 | M | August 4, 1915 | Florence | Rape | Female, white | Richard Irvine Manning III |
| Jessie McNeil | Black | 26 | M | September 2, 1915 | Marlboro | Murder | Ida McNeil, 25, black (wife) | Richard Irvine Manning III |
| Nelson Price | Black | 20 | M | September 29, 1915 | Chester | Murder-Robbery (Note: The Griffin brothers were posthumously pardoned in 2009.) | John Q. Lewis, 73, white | Richard Irvine Manning III |
| Tom Griffin | Black | 27 | M | September 29, 1915 | Chester | Murder-Robbery | John Q. Lewis, 73, white | Richard Irvine Manning III |
| John Crosby | Black | 33 | M | September 29, 1915 | Chester | Murder-Robbery | John Q. Lewis, 73, white | Richard Irvine Manning III |
| Meeks Griffin | Black | 25 | M | September 29, 1915 | Chester | Murder-Robbery | John Q. Lewis, 73, white | Richard Irvine Manning III |
| Joe Malloy | Black | 45 | M | September 29, 1915 | Marlboro | Murder | Prentiss Moore and Guy Rogers, 11 and 15, white (Note: Also suspected of killing his wife several weeks later due to concerns she would reveal the crime.) | Richard Irvine Manning III |
| Charley Logan | Black | 17 | M | October 15, 1915 | Abbeville | Murder | Frances Helmina Boles Scott, 80, white | Richard Irvine Manning III |
| Peter Hamilton | Black | 25 | M | February 4, 1916 | Pickens | Attempted rape | Female, white | Richard Irvine Manning III |
| Israel Good | Black | 17 | M | February 25, 1916 | York | Rape | Female, 6, white | Richard Irvine Manning III |
| Slabo Bailey | Black | 25 | M | April 28, 1916 | Laurens | Murder | Sallie Barksdale, 36, black | Richard Irvine Manning III |
| Monroe Collins | Black | 22 | M | May 15, 1916 | Greenville | Attempted rape | Female, white | Richard Irvine Manning III |
| Joe Grant | Black | 47 | M | May 15, 1916 | Edgefield | Murder | Jesse T. Durst, 36, white | Richard Irvine Manning III |
| Ellis Jonathan | Black | 38 | M | September 15, 1916 | Edgefield | Attempted rape-Burglary | Female, white | Richard Irvine Manning III |
| John Johnson | Black | 23 | M | March 23, 1917 | Dillon | Murder-Robbery | Hugh Harrelson, 67, white | Richard Irvine Manning III |
| Mackey Palmer | Black | 20 | M | October 12, 1917 | Orangeburg | Murder | Howard H. Franklin, 60, white (police sergeant) | Richard Irvine Manning III |
| John Gardner | Black | 21 | M | January 25, 1918 | Beaufort | Murder | Samuel Hirsch Schein, 42, white (adoptive father) | Richard Irvine Manning III |
| William Furgerson | Black | 18 | M | May 10, 1918 | Barnwell | Attempted rape | Female, white | Richard Irvine Manning III |
| Sam Holliware | Black | 37 | M | July 19, 1918 | Colleton | Attempted rape | Female, white | Richard Irvine Manning III |
| Samuel Johnson | Black | 18 | M | January 10, 1919 | York | Attempted rape | Female, white | Richard Irvine Manning III |
| Aaron Walker | Black | 25 | M | March 8, 1919 | Greenwood | Attempted rape-Burglary | Eliza Hill, white | Robert Archer Cooper |
| George Johnson | Black | 19 | M | July 11, 1919 | Lancaster | Attempted rape | Female, white | Robert Archer Cooper |
| Moses Witherspoon | Black | 27 | M | November 14, 1919 | Lancaster | Murder | Luther Horton, 41, white (Note: Witherspoon had previously been acquitted of another murder.) | Robert Archer Cooper |
| John Maxwell | Black | 20 | M | August 6, 1920 | Charleston | Murder | George S. Douan, 55, white | Robert Archer Cooper |
| James Washington | Black | 22 | M | September 24, 1920 | Greenville | Rape | Female, 14, white | Robert Archer Cooper |
| Grover Butler | Black | 24 | M | December 14, 1920 | Spartanburg | Attempted rape | Emily Mabry, 29, white | Robert Archer Cooper |
| Will Lomax | Black | | M | February 4, 1921 | Greenville | Murder | Female, black (wife) | Robert Archer Cooper |
| Ivey Littlejohn | Black | 25 | M | February 18, 1921 | Spartanburg | Murder | Joseph S. Holbert, 48, white (guard) | Robert Archer Cooper |
| Adam Griffin | Black | 27 | M | March 4, 1921 | Sumter | Murder | Archie M. Sox, 41, white | Robert Archer Cooper |
| Richard Fogle | Black | 14 | M | March 25, 1921 | Calhoun | Murder | Earle Wadford, 23, white | Robert Archer Cooper |
| Albert Wilson | Black | 24 | M | May 3, 1921 | Richland | Murder | Bryan E. Butler, 23, white | Robert Archer Cooper |
| Pink Griffin | Black | 24 | M | September 2, 1921 | Greenwood | Murder | Lawton C. Lipscomb, 60, white | Robert Archer Cooper |
| Harvey Whaley | Black | 40 | M | November 4, 1921 | Calhoun | Murder | Earle Wadford, 23, white (Note: Also murdered Cornett Zeigler (23, white) during the same crime.) | Robert Archer Cooper |
| Tillman Choice | Black | 21 | M | December 2, 1921 | Spartanburg | Rape | Mollie Ivey, 37, white | Robert Archer Cooper |
| Curtis Franklin | Black | 33 | M | February 3, 1922 | Aiken | Rape | Female, white | Robert Archer Cooper |
| Will Hood | Black | 19 | M | April 7, 1922 | Greenville | Murder | George W. Smith, 65, white | Robert Archer Cooper |
| S. J. Kirby | White | 35 | M | June 16, 1922 | Lexington | Murder-Robbery | Willie C. Brazell, 19, white | Wilson Godfrey Harvey |
| Jesse Gappins | White | 21 | M | June 16, 1922 | Lexington | Murder-Robbery | Willie C. Brazell, 19, white | Wilson Godfrey Harvey |
| C. O. Fox | White | 31 | M | June 16, 1922 | Lexington | Murder-Robbery | Willie C. Brazell, 19, white | Wilson Godfrey Harvey |
| Frank Jeffords | White | 29 | M | December 22, 1922 | Richland | Murder | John C. Arnette, 45, white | Wilson Godfrey Harvey |
| Thomas Johnson | Black | 16 | M | February 2, 1923 | Bamberg | Murder-Rape | Laura Riley Lancaster, 63, white | Thomas Gordon McLeod |
| Ira Harrison | White | 22 | M | February 16, 1923 | Richland | Murder | John C. Arnette, 45, white | Thomas Gordon McLeod |
| Jake Terry | Black | 25 | M | March 16, 1923 | Hampton | Murder | Thaddeus Fulton, 29, black | Thomas Gordon McLeod |
| Eugene Adams | Black | 20 | M | June 22, 1923 | Orangeburg | Murder-Robbery | J. Attaway Brown, 61, white | Thomas Gordon McLeod |
| George Allen | Black | | M | July 20, 1923 | Anderson | Murder | Cecil Hale, white | Thomas Gordon McLeod |
| Frank Gaines | Black | 26 | M | December 22, 1923 | Beaufort | Murder-Burglary | William D. and Lulia Bradley Brown, 68 and 54, white | Thomas Gordon McLeod |
| Julius Garvin | Black | 28 | M | December 22, 1923 | Beaufort | Murder-Burglary | William D. and Lulia Bradley Brown, 68 and 54, white | Thomas Gordon McLeod |
| Jeff Chandler | White | 37 | M | February 1, 1924 | Greenville | Murder | Rosie McDaniel Bramlett, 68, white (mother-in-law) (Note: Also killed Rosa's daughter, his 32-year-old wife Theodus Bramlett Chandler.) | Thomas Gordon McLeod |
| Charlie Simuel | Black | 24 | M | June 20, 1924 | Spartanburg | Murder-Robbery | Lemick Long, 60, black | Thomas Gordon McLeod |
| Rubin Robinson | Black | 17 | M | November 7, 1924 | Chester | Attempted rape | Female, 18, white | Thomas Gordon McLeod |
| Frank Harrell | White | 24 | M | December 5, 1924 | Chesterfield | Murder-Robbery | Samuel H. McLeary, 43, white | Thomas Gordon McLeod |
| Mortimer King | White | 25 | M | December 5, 1924 | Chesterfield | Murder-Robbery | Samuel H. McLeary, 43, white | Thomas Gordon McLeod |
| Carroll Orr | Black | 56 | M | June 5, 1925 | Charleston (Note: Change of venue from Berkeley County.) | Murder | John Madison Heape, 79, white | Thomas Gordon McLeod |
| Draper Jeffries | Black | 31 | M | August 28, 1925 | Spartanburg | Murder | Effie Mitchell, 25, black | Thomas Gordon McLeod |
| John Cooper | Black | 43 | M | August 27, 1926 | Charleston | Murder-Robbery | Spiro Constan and Louie L. Smith, 29 and 22, white | Thomas Gordon McLeod |
| McKinley Thompson | Black | 18 | M | August 12, 1927 | York | Murder | Frances Cowan Thomasson, 78, white | John Gardiner Richards Jr. |
| John Brown | Black | 22 | M | January 4, 1929 | Charleston | Murder-Robbery | Chu Yuan Fat, 58, Asian | John Gardiner Richards Jr. |
| George Palmer | Black | 22 | M | January 4, 1929 | Charleston | Murder-Robbery | Chu Yuan Fat, 58, Asian | John Gardiner Richards Jr. |
| Charlie Robinson | Black | 23 | M | April 19, 1929 | Charleston | Murder | Mamie Hutchinson Smith, 18, black (common-law wife) | John Gardiner Richards Jr. |
| Eli Truesdale | Black | 29 | M | April 29, 1930 | Lee | Murder | Willie and Lillian Burris Bristow, 54 and 46, black | John Gardiner Richards Jr. |
| George Washington | Black | 22 | M | May 16, 1930 | Allendale | Murder | Elliott Bates, 43, black (Note: Also indicted for killing Frank Harley (48, white), but not tried on this charge.) | John Gardiner Richards Jr. |
| Ossie Moore | Black | 24 | M | May 16, 1930 | Allendale | Murder | Elliott Bates, 43, black | John Gardiner Richards Jr. |
| Ray Coleman | White | 29 | M | June 24, 1930 | Spartanburg | Murder-Robbery | Earle Belue, 28, white | John Gardiner Richards Jr. |
| Paul Johnson | White | 29 | M | June 24, 1930 | Spartanburg | Murder-Robbery | Earle Belue, 28, white | John Gardiner Richards Jr. |
| James Hickman | Black | 26 | M | February 27, 1931 | Lexington | Murder-Robbery | Bob Wilbur Hendrix, 41, white | Ibra Charles Blackwood |
| Robert Eldridge | Black | 26 | M | February 27, 1931 | Lexington | Murder-Robbery | Bob Wilbur Hendrix, 41, white | Ibra Charles Blackwood |
| George Bird | Black | 21 | M | February 27, 1931 | Lexington | Murder-Robbery | Bob Wilbur Hendrix, 41, white | Ibra Charles Blackwood |
| John Cantrell | Black | 26 | M | February 27, 1931 | Lexington | Murder-Robbery | Bob Wilbur Hendrix, 41, white | Ibra Charles Blackwood |
| Earnest Thomas | Black | 23 | M | February 27, 1931 | Lexington | Murder-Robbery | Bob Wilbur Hendrix, 41, white | Ibra Charles Blackwood |
| Tillman Boozer | Black | 32 | M | February 27, 1931 | Lexington | Murder-Robbery | Clarence D. Mills, 52, white | Ibra Charles Blackwood |
| Norman Blakely | Black | 18 | M | May 26, 1931 | Greenville | Murder | Dock M. Garrett, 55, white (guard) | Ibra Charles Blackwood |
| J. P. Moore | Black | 21 | M | June 12, 1931 | Cherokee | Attempted rape | Female, white | Ibra Charles Blackwood |
| Albert Floyd | White | 25 | M | July 10, 1931 | Aiken | Murder | Howard Bell, 34, white | Ibra Charles Blackwood |
| David King | Black | 21 | M | January 8, 1932 | Spartanburg | Murder-Robbery | Haskell Hill, 24, white | Ibra Charles Blackwood |
| Richard Dean | Black | 17 | M | January 8, 1932 | Spartanburg | Murder-Robbery | Haskell Hill, 24, white | Ibra Charles Blackwood |
| James Sturdevant | Black | 27 | M | January 8, 1932 | Horry | Rape | Female, 48, white | Ibra Charles Blackwood |
| Roy Jones | Black | 23 | M | April 29, 1932 | Spartanburg | Murder | Annie Mae Young, 21, black (girlfriend) | Ibra Charles Blackwood |
| Hilton Williams | Black | 28 | M | July 15, 1932 | Marlboro | Murder-Robbery | John L. James, 52, white | Ibra Charles Blackwood |
| Eban Woods | Black | 32 | M | July 29, 1932 | Darlington | Murder | Hattie Chambers Samuel, 28, black | Ibra Charles Blackwood |
| Booker Copeland | Black | 35 | M | July 29, 1932 | Colleton | Murder | Henry Creech McMillan, 55, white | Ibra Charles Blackwood |
| Buster Tucker | Black | 25 | M | July 29, 1932 | Colleton | Murder | Henry Creech McMillan, 55, white | Ibra Charles Blackwood |
| O. E. S. Howell | White | 42 | M | December 16, 1932 | Sumter | Murder | Ernest Hart Williams, 33, white | Ibra Charles Blackwood |
| William Sanders | Black | 18 | M | March 3, 1933 | York | Murder | Zula Stephenson, 59, white | Ibra Charles Blackwood |
| James Jones | Black | 23 | M | March 3, 1933 | Aiken | Murder | Charles Green, 68, white | Ibra Charles Blackwood |
| James Dicks | Black | 27 | M | March 3, 1933 | Aiken | Murder | Charles Green, 68, white | Ibra Charles Blackwood |
| Ronnie Smith | Black | 21 | M | July 21, 1933 | Laurens | Rape | Female, white | Ibra Charles Blackwood |
| James Holmes | Black | 26 | M | December 4, 1933 | Sumter | Murder | Nora Franklin, 39, black (aunt) | Ibra Charles Blackwood |
| Tom Wardlaw | Black | 53 | M | December 4, 1933 | Newberry (Note: Change of venue from Abbeville County.) | Murder | Andrew J. Ferguson, 62, white | Ibra Charles Blackwood |
| Robert Wiles | White | 49 | M | March 12, 1934 | Richland | Murder-Kidnap | Hubbard H. Harris Jr., 15, white (Note: Previously murdered his wife and a man named Gordon in Durham, North Carolina in 1925, but was acquitted.) | Ibra Charles Blackwood |
| John Watkins | Black | 24 | M | April 13, 1934 | Fairfield | Murder | Raymond A. Feaster, 44, white (county sheriff) | Ibra Charles Blackwood |
| James Kinloch | Black | 20 | M | April 27, 1934 | Charleston | Murder-Robbery | George C. Garrett, 41, white | Ibra Charles Blackwood |
| John Ellis | Black | 18 | M | April 27, 1934 | Charleston | Murder-Robbery | George C. Garrett, 41, white | Ibra Charles Blackwood |
| Tom Richardson | Black | 17 | M | June 6, 1934 | Georgetown | Murder-Robbery | John Milton, 37, black | Ibra Charles Blackwood |
| Eddie Lee | Black | 19 | M | June 6, 1934 | Georgetown | Murder-Robbery | John Milton, 37, black | Ibra Charles Blackwood |
| Payton Brown | White | 22 | M | July 13, 1934 | Darlington | Murder | Gertrude Melton Brown, 25, white (wife) | Ibra Charles Blackwood |
| Reuben Jones | Black | 18 | M | July 20, 1934 | Lancaster | Murder-Robbery | Bernard McCullens, 17, white | Ibra Charles Blackwood |
| Eaver Pugh | Black | 24 | M | October 12, 1934 | Sumter | Murder-Robbery | James W. Grooms, 57, white (Note: Also previously killed an elderly black man named Brunson, of which he had been acquitted but subsequently admitted to.) | Ibra Charles Blackwood |
| Joe Cunningham | Black | 19 | M | November 30, 1934 | Richland | Murder-Robbery | Samuel C. Moore, 76, white | Ibra Charles Blackwood |
| Clarence Floyd | Black | 20 | M | January 4, 1935 | Lexington | Rape-Robbery | Female, 20, white (Note: Serial rapist, attacked couples in their cars.) | Ibra Charles Blackwood |
| Curtis Williams | Black | 24 | M | May 24, 1935 | Greenville | Murder | Ansel Gary Drummond, 21, white | Olin D. Johnston |
| Thurman Harris | Black | 24 | M | June 7, 1935 | Barnwell | Rape | Female, 68, white | Olin D. Johnston |
| Ransome Emanuel | Black | 65 | M | July 26, 1935 | Florence | Murder-Rape | Jane Calcutt Haines, 90, white | Olin D. Johnston |
| Monroe Stewart | Black | 22 | M | July 26, 1935 | Calhoun | Murder | Edward Hayne, 60, black | Olin D. Johnston |
| D. M. Blanden | Black | 19 | M | August 16, 1935 | Spartanburg | Murder | Benjamin F. Sims, 25, white | Olin D. Johnston |
| Cornell Luster | Black | 29 | M | December 20, 1935 | Greenville | Murder | Edwin D. Milam, 25, white (highway patrolman) | Olin D. Johnston |
| Harry Hill | Black | 24 | M | December 20, 1935 | Greenville | Murder | Edwin D. Milam, 25, white (highway patrolman) | Olin D. Johnston |
| Robert Ashley | Black | 17 | M | June 26, 1936 | Richland | Murder-Robbery | Joe Byrd, 42, white (prison guard) | Olin D. Johnston |
| James Mixon | Black | 20 | M | July 24, 1936 | Lee | Murder-Robbery | Redic Johnson Kelley, 62, white | Olin D. Johnston |
| Wash Desseseau | Black | 25 | M | July 24, 1936 | Lee | Murder-Robbery | Redic Johnson Kelley, 62, white | Olin D. Johnston |
| Sam Powell | White | 25 | M | December 11, 1936 | Anderson | Murder-Robbery | Walter Anderson Daniel, 25, white | Olin D. Johnston |
| Sam Anderson | White | 24 | M | December 11, 1936 | Anderson | Murder-Robbery | Walter Anderson Daniel, 25, white | Olin D. Johnston |
| George McDuffie | Black | 22 | M | April 9, 1937 | Lee | Murder-Robbery | Margie Ann Brown, 73, white | Olin D. Johnston |
| Furman McDonald | White | 45 | M | August 20, 1937 | Fairfield | Murder | Hugh B. Thompson Jr., 13, white | Olin D. Johnston |
| Earnest Gaines | Black | 25 | M | April 13, 1938 | Saluda | Murder-Robbery | Brunson Edwin Coleman and Carrie Myers Sullivan, 28 and 45, white and black | Olin D. Johnston |
| Benjamin Rivers | Black | 46 | M | April 29, 1938 | Charleston | Murder | Purce A. Wansley, 44, white (police officer) | Olin D. Johnston |
| L. O. Goodman | Black | 24 | M | July 29, 1938 | Florence | Murder | Eugene Llewellyn Singletary, 28, white (Note: Also killed a black woman, 25-year-old Eloise Graham, the day prior.) | Olin D. Johnston |
| George Gates | Black | 21 | M | December 9, 1938 | Darlington | Rape | Female, 16, white | Olin D. Johnston |
| George Wingard | White | 23 | M | March 24, 1939 | Richland | Murder | John Olin Sanders, 61, white (guard captain) | Burnet R. Maybank |
| Clayton Crans | White | 29 | M | March 24, 1939 | Richland | Murder | John Olin Sanders, 61, white (guard captain) | Burnet R. Maybank |
| Herbert Moorman | White | 42 | M | March 24, 1939 | Richland | Murder | John Olin Sanders, 61, white (guard captain) | Burnet R. Maybank |
| J. V. Bair | White | 28 | M | March 24, 1939 | Richland | Murder | John Olin Sanders, 61, white (guard captain) | Burnet R. Maybank |
| Roy Suttles | White | 29 | M | March 24, 1939 | Richland | Murder | John Olin Sanders, 61, white (guard captain) | Burnet R. Maybank |
| William Woods | White | 25 | M | March 24, 1939 | Richland | Murder | John Olin Sanders, 61, white (guard captain) | Burnet R. Maybank |
| Edward Humphrey | White | 52 | M | April 11, 1939 | Dillon | Murder | Kathleen Harris Humphrey, 29, white (wife) | Burnet R. Maybank |
| Joseph Broughton | Black | 39 | M | June 23, 1939 | Berkeley | Murder-Robbery | James E. DuTart, 44, white | Burnet R. Maybank |
| Otis McGill | White | 31 | M | July 28, 1939 | Greenville | Murder | Arthur P. Southerlin, 58, white | Burnet R. Maybank |
| Grover Odom | White | 55 | M | October 24, 1939 | York | Murder | Delbert Lee Cochran, 19, white (son-in-law) | Burnet R. Maybank |
| Frank Dash Jr. | Black | 21 | M | January 19, 1940 | Calhoun | Murder-Rape-Burglary | Pizetta Haigler, 62, black | Burnet R. Maybank |
| Press Bibbs | Black | 20 | M | March 29, 1940 | McCormick | Murder | James Lewis Leslie, 45, white | Burnet R. Maybank |
| Will Lowry | Black | 18 | M | June 14, 1940 | York | Rape | Female, 22, white | Burnet R. Maybank |
| Frank Lansing | Black | 26 | M | July 27, 1940 | Horry | Murder | Joseph Pinkman Roberts, 65, white | Burnet R. Maybank |
| George Abney | Black | 38 | M | September 6, 1940 | Saluda | Murder | Ella Abney (wife) and Mary Lois Long Rearden, 30 and 41, black and white | Burnet R. Maybank |
| Josiah Woodward | Black | 21 | M | January 31, 1941 | Aiken | Attempted rape | Female, white | Burnet R. Maybank |
| Hampton Lee | White | 25 | M | February 7, 1941 | Richland | Rape-Robbery-Kidnap | Mary Ross Seibels Walker, 34, white | Burnet R. Maybank |
| Willis Evans | White | 19 | M | February 7, 1941 | Richland | Rape-Robbery-Kidnap | Mary Ross Seibels Walker, 34, white | Burnet R. Maybank |
| Hugh Evans | White | 22 | M | February 7, 1941 | Richland | Rape-Robbery-Kidnap | Mary Ross Seibels Walker, 34, white | Burnet R. Maybank |
| J. C. Hann | White | 28 | M | February 7, 1941 | Pickens | Murder | Ruby Lee Bowling, 22, white (girlfriend) | Burnet R. Maybank |
| Will Hood | Black | 28 | M | April 11, 1941 | Fairfield | Murder | William Walter Lathan, 62, white | Burnet R. Maybank |
| Heyward Daniels | Black | 28 | M | July 11, 1941 | Orangeburg | Attempted rape | Female, 73, white | Burnet R. Maybank |
| Benjamin Heyward | Black | 32 | M | August 15, 1941 | Beaufort | Murder | Benjamin Paul Carden, 22, white (police officer) | Burnet R. Maybank |
| Roy Long | Black | 27 | M | November 21, 1941 | Pickens | Rape | Female, 74, white | Joseph Emile Harley |
| George Thomas | Black | 30 | M | February 20, 1942 | Georgetown | Rape | Female, white | Joseph Emile Harley |
| Monroe Bounds | Black | 23 | M | March 13, 1942 | Florence | Murder | Spy W. Farmer, 63, white | Richard Manning Jefferies |
| Cyrus Pinckney | Black | 28 | M | July 10, 1942 | Berkeley | Attempted rape | Jessie Lee Cumbee, 15, white | Richard Manning Jefferies |
| Richard Gaymon | Black | 22 | M | August 7, 1942 | Clarendon | Attempted rape-Burglary | Female, white | Richard Manning Jefferies |
| Alchrist Grant | Black | 29 | M | September 11, 1942 | Berkeley | Attempted rape | Jessie Lee Cumbee, 15, white | Richard Manning Jefferies |
| Zonnie Frazier Jr. | Black | 19 | M | December 11, 1942 | Darlington | Murder | Claude R. DuBose, 58, white (police officer) | Richard Manning Jefferies |
| John Robinson | White | 18 | M | December 11, 1942 | Spartanburg | Murder-Robbery | Kenneth Jerome Wofford, 56, white | Richard Manning Jefferies |
| George Logue | White | 53 | M | January 15, 1943 | Lexington | Murder | Davis W. Timmerman, 42, white (Note: Also murdered Sheriff Day Allen (55, white) and deputy William Llody Clark (50, white).) | Richard Manning Jefferies |
| Clarence Bagwell | White | 32 | M | January 15, 1943 | Lexington | Murder | Davis W. Timmerman, 42, white | Richard Manning Jefferies |
| Sue Logue | White | 41 | F | January 15, 1943 | Lexington | Murder | Davis W. Timmerman, 42, white | Richard Manning Jefferies |
| Jessie Jones | Black | 20 | M | April 2, 1943 | Spartanburg | Murder-Burglary | James Leard and Mary Wooten Hughes, 67 and 64, white (Note: Also murdered Landrum Columbus Petrie (86, white) and Ida Pretie (72, white).) | Olin D. Johnston |
| Johnny Sims | Black | 17 | M | July 16, 1943 | Spartanburg | Murder-Robbery | Walter Cox, 59, white | Olin D. Johnston |
| Sylvester McKinney | Black | 21 | M | July 16, 1943 | Spartanburg | Murder-Robbery | Walter Cox, 59, white | Olin D. Johnston |
| Sammy Osborne | Black | 19 | M | November 19, 1943 | Barnwell | Murder | William P. Walker, 58, white | Olin D. Johnston |
| Frank Timmons | Black | 20 | M | May 12, 1944 | Horry | Attempted rape | Pearl Prince, 31, white | Olin D. Johnston |
| Bruce Hamilton | Black | 20 | M | June 16, 1944 | Greenville | Attempted rape | Josephine Walker, white | Olin D. Johnston |
| George Stinney | Black | 14 (Note: Youngest person with an exact confirmed birth date to be executed in the United States in the 20th century.) | M | June 16, 1944 | Clarendon | Murder-Rape | Betty June Binnicker, 11, white (Note: Indicted but not tried for the murder of and Mary Emma Thames (7, white). In 2014, Stinney's conviction was posthumously vacated since his civil rights had been violated, albeit the judge stated that Stinney "may well have committed this crime.") | Olin D. Johnston |
| Hurley Jones | Black | 22 | M | November 3, 1944 | Greenville | Rape | Female, 17, white | Olin D. Johnston |
| Charles Gilstrap | White | 29 | M | February 9, 1945 | Greenville | Rape | Female, 11, white | Ransome Judson Williams |
| George Carter | Black | 29 | M | December 4, 1945 | Greenville | Attempted rape-Burglary | Female, 62, white (Note: Serving a 40-year sentence for a similar attack at time of crime. Raped victim while a prison trusty.) | Ransome Judson Williams |
| Wash Pringle | Black | 32 | M | January 25, 1946 | Sumter | Murder | Annie S. Heriot, 39, white | Ransome Judson Williams |
| Junius Judge | Black | 25 | M | July 12, 1946 | Charleston | Murder | Alric Aaron Gore, 25, white | Ransome Judson Williams |
| Louis C. Gatlin | Black | 21 | M | July 19, 1946 | Charleston | Rape-Burglary | Female, 24, white (Note: Serial rapist, previously raped two other women.) | Ransome Judson Williams |
| Charlie Smith | Black | 66 | M | November 29, 1946 | Berkeley | Murder | William Calhoun Guerry, 57, white (magistrate's constable) | Ransome Judson Williams |
| Lewis Scott | Black | 26 | M | December 20, 1946 | Williamsburg | Murder | Walter Evans, 45, white (Greeleyville night police officer) | Ransome Judson Williams |
| Cleve Covington | Black | 26 | M | January 3, 1947 | Marion | Murder | Watt N. Martin, 48, white | Ransome Judson Williams |
| Rosa Stinette | Black | 49 | F | January 17, 1947 | Florence | Murder | Charles Stinette, 29, black (husband) | Ransome Judson Williams |
| Robert Jordon | Black | 21 | M | February 14, 1947 | Florence | Murder | Irene Finklen Matthews, 53, white | Strom Thurmond |
| Talmage Haggins | Black | 25 | M | April 18, 1947 | Lancaster | Murder-Robbery | Oliver Benjamin Powers Jr., 28, white | Strom Thurmond |
| Freddie Jones | Black | 19 | M | April 25, 1947 | Chester | Murder | Gladys Smith Woods, 23, black | Strom Thurmond |
| John Dickerson | Black | 35 | M | May 2, 1947 | Charleston | Murder-Rape | Louise Stevens, 24, black (girlfriend) | Strom Thurmond |
| William Davis | Black | 24 | M | June 20, 1947 | Sumter | Rape-Burglary | Female, white | Strom Thurmond |
| J. C. Sims | Black | 36 | M | July 11, 1947 | Anderson | Murder | Willis Edwin Sanders, 41, white (police officer) | Strom Thurmond |
| Bert Grant Jr. | Black | 18 | M | July 25, 1947 | Darlington | Rape | Female, 35, white | Strom Thurmond |
| William Pooler | Black | 19 | M | August 1, 1947 | Darlington | Rape | Female, 67, white | Strom Thurmond |
| Earnest Willis | Black | 26 | M | August 15, 1947 | Chester | Murder-Robbery | Willie Reed, 51, black | Strom Thurmond |
| Leonard Pringle | Black | 23 | M | August 15, 1947 | Chester | Murder-Robbery | Willie Reed, 51, black | Strom Thurmond |
| Roosevelt Miller | Black | 22 | M | December 12, 1947 | Greenville | Rape | Female, white (Note: Serial rapist, committed several similar attacks during the same time period. Previously escaped from a chain gang while serving time for attempted rape.) | Strom Thurmond |
| Earnest Howard | Black | 25 | M | January 2, 1948 | Chesterfield | Attempted rape-Burglary | Jennie Crowley, 18, white (Note: Serving a life sentence for murdering a man three years prior at time of crime.) | Strom Thurmond |
| Willie Gidron | Black | 19 | M | January 9, 1948 | Calhoun | Murder | George David Tilley, 47, white (sheriff) (Note: Previously murdered William L. Riley (61, black) during a burglary and was under arrest at time of second murder.) | Strom Thurmond |
| Lawrence Davis | Black | 29 | M | September 17, 1948 | Marlboro | Murder-Burglary | Luther Ransome, 66, white | Strom Thurmond |
| Matthew Jamison Jr. | Black | 17 | M | December 3, 1948 | Lexington | Rape-Robbery-Kidnap | Female, 21, white | Strom Thurmond |
| Leroy Troy | Black | 22 | M | December 31, 1948 | Horry | Rape | Myrtis Kissinger, 23, white | Strom Thurmond |
| Willie Lincoln | Black | 25 | M | February 4, 1949 | Orangeburg | Murder | Willie Lee Adams and Alberta Adams Johnson, 32 and 40, black | Strom Thurmond |
| Willie Tolbert | Black | 24 | M | October 28, 1949 | Greenwood | Rape-Kidnap | Female, 16, white | Strom Thurmond |
| Charles Butler | Black | 40 | M | June 2, 1950 | Marlboro | Murder-Burglary | Luther Ransome, 66, white | Strom Thurmond |
| E. T. Preylow | Black | 31 | M | June 30, 1950 | Saluda | Murder | Fred Simpkins, 34, black | Strom Thurmond |
| Larry Elmore | Black | 43 | M | August 4, 1950 | Laurens | Murder-Robbery | Virgil Martin Betsill, 65, white | Strom Thurmond |
| Carroll Gantt | Black | 18 | M | November 16, 1951 | Orangeburg | Murder | James W. Ethridge, 39, white (police chief) (Note: Also shot bystander Randolph D. Varn (18, black.)) | James F. Byrnes |
| Smith Harvey | Black | 41 | M | January 25, 1952 | Beaufort | Murder | Three people, white (Note: Aubrey Godley (29), Lonnie Godley (25), and Wilson Lee McAlhaney (21).) | James F. Byrnes |
| Frank Cox | White | 41 | M | February 15, 1952 | Spartanburg | Murder | Neola and Sandra Cox, 27 and 1, white (wife and daughter) | James F. Byrnes |
| J. P. Priester | Black | 20 | M | April 18, 1952 | Beaufort | Murder-Robbery | Harry Wilson, 50, white | James F. Byrnes |
| John Priester | Black | 24 | M | April 18, 1952 | Beaufort | Murder-Robbery | Harry Wilson, 50, white | James F. Byrnes |
| William Blasingame | White | 32 | M | April 18, 1952 | Spartanburg | Murder-Rape | Donna Kay Dobbins, 2, white (common-law stepdaughter) | James F. Byrnes |
| Roland Wyatt | Black | 28 | M | June 13, 1952 | Spartanburg | Rape-Burglary | Female, 41, white | James F. Byrnes |
| Shelton Gainey | White | 24 | M | March 5, 1954 | Horry | Murder-Robbery-Kidnap | Robert D. Oliver, 27, white | James F. Byrnes |
| Lander Gantt | White | 31 | M | March 5, 1954 | Horry | Murder-Robbery-Kidnap | Robert D. Oliver, 27, white | James F. Byrnes |
| Otis Glenn | Black | 23 | M | March 12, 1954 | Orangeburg | Murder-Robbery | Walter Herald Lee, 40, white | James F. Byrnes |
| Raymond Carney | Black | 37 | M | May 7, 1954 | Florence | Murder-Rape-Robbery | Henry Bennett Allen and Betty Claire Cain, 22 and 15, white | James F. Byrnes |
| Willie Hayden | Black | 35 | M | August 27, 1954 | Lancaster | Murder-Robbery | Murdock Johnson, 66, white (inmate) (Note: Was serving a 12-year sentence for murder.) | James F. Byrnes |
| Arthur Waitus | Black | 37 | M | April 15, 1955 | Georgetown | Murder-Rape | Maylees Cribb Coker, 35, white | George Bell Timmerman Jr. |
| Marvin Chasteen | White | 41 | M | October 7, 1955 | McCormick | Murder | Roy Daniel Wiggins, 49, white | George Bell Timmerman Jr. |
| Willie Daniels Jr. | Black | 24 | M | December 2, 1955 | Lee | Rape-Robbery | Female, 18, white | George Bell Timmerman Jr. |
| Clay Daniels | Black | 23 | M | December 2, 1955 | Lee | Rape-Robbery | Female, 18, white | George Bell Timmerman Jr. |
| Samuel Wright | Black | 20 | M | January 3, 1956 | Orangeburg | Murder-Robbery | Mary Lee Bannister Stroman, 75, white | George Bell Timmerman Jr. |
| Henry Boone | Black | 33 | M | January 20, 1956 | Cherokee | Murder | Agnes Irene Willard Webb, 32, white | George Bell Timmerman Jr. |
| Raymond Fuller | Black | 31 | M | July 27, 1956 | Spartanburg | Murder-Robbery | Lynn Baxter Moorman, 26, white | George Bell Timmerman Jr. |
| Harold Byrd | Black | 24 | M | July 27, 1956 | Spartanburg | Murder-Robbery | Curtis Moss, 40, black | George Bell Timmerman Jr. |
| Willie Daniels | Black | 20 | M | June 7, 1957 | Allendale | Rape-Burglary | Female, 50, white | George Bell Timmerman Jr. |
| James Smith | Black | 35 | M | July 5, 1957 | Abbeville | Murder-Robbery | Frank Lloyd Pardue, 39, white | George Bell Timmerman Jr. |
| Robert Johnson Jr. | Black | 29 | M | May 31, 1960 | Orangeburg | Attempted rape (Note: Last execution in the United States for attempted rape.) | Ms. Dantzler, 52, white | Fritz Hollings |
| Quincy Bullock | Black | 46 | M | April 28, 1961 | Dillon | Murder-Rape | Carolyn Barfield Walshock, 28, white | Fritz Hollings |
| Charlie Robinson | Black | 29 | M | May 26, 1961 | Orangeburg | Rape-Burglary | Female, 58, white | Fritz Hollings |
| Douglas Westbury | White | 29 | M | June 19, 1961 | Orangeburg | Murder | Harry Boyd Ray, 31, white (state trooper) | Fritz Hollings |
| Otis Britt | White | 27 | M | June 19, 1961 | Orangeburg | Murder | Harry Boyd Ray, 31, white (state trooper) | Fritz Hollings |
| Walter Outen | Black | 31 | M | July 14, 1961 | Richland | Rape | Female, 30+, white | Fritz Hollings |
| Ray Young | Black | 30 | M | April 20, 1962 | Greenville | Murder-Robbery | John S. Kehayas, 63, white | Fritz Hollings |
| Douglas Thorne | White | 26 | M | April 20, 1962 | Greenville | Rape-Kidnap | Female, 16, white | Fritz Hollings |

== See also ==
- Capital punishment in South Carolina
- Crime in South Carolina
