= Cornwell Inn =

- U.S. National Register of Historic Places
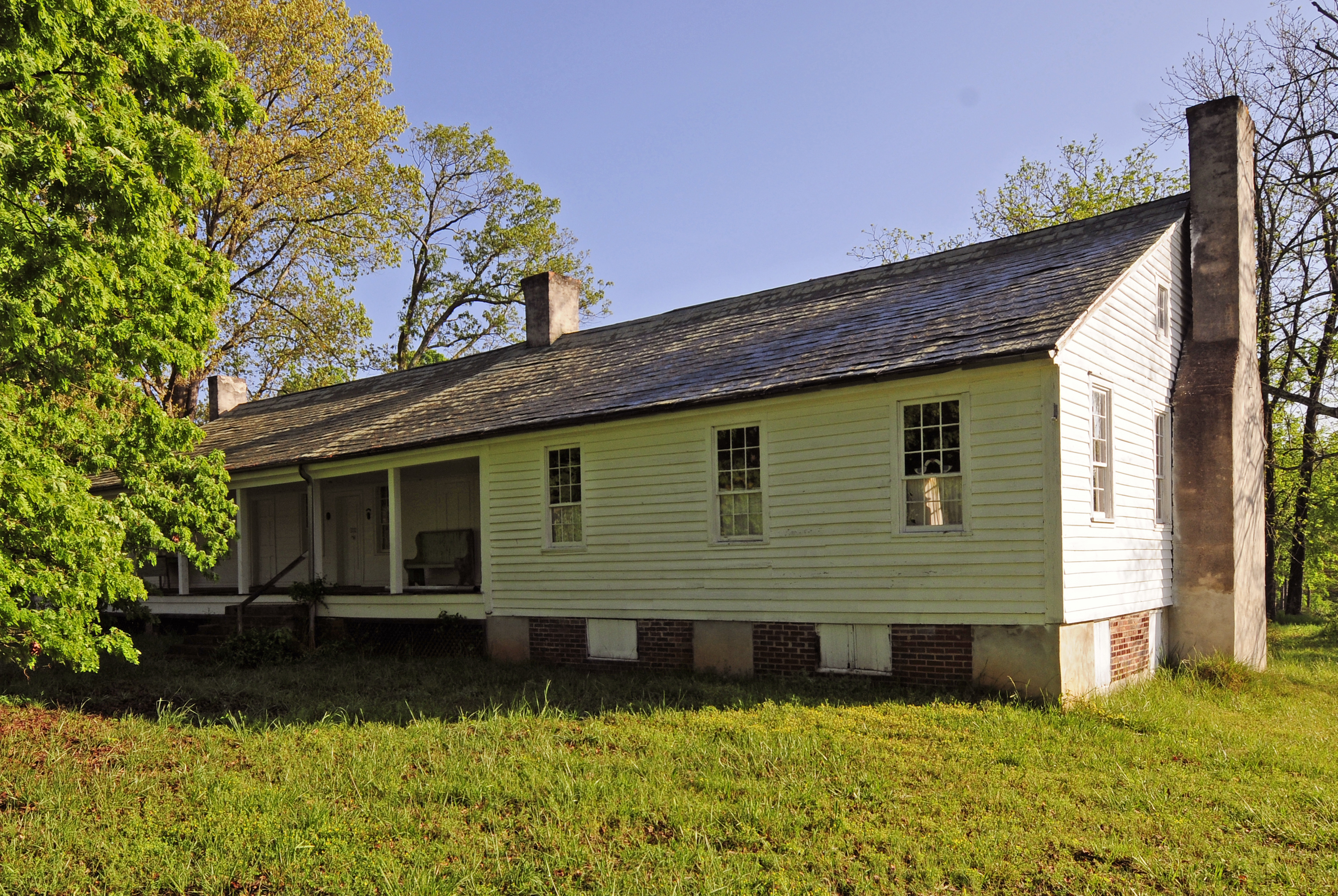
- Cornwell Inn, April 2012

- Location within South Carolina Location within the United States
- Location: Junction of U.S. Route 321 and South Carolina Highway 205, near Blackstock, South Carolina
- Coordinates: 34°36′27″N 81°10′42″W
- Area: 5 acres (2.0 ha)
- Built: c. 1841
- Architectural style: Federal, Greek Revival
- NRHP reference No.: 94000044
- Added to NRHP: February 18, 1994

Cornwell Inn, also known as Cornwell's, is a historic inn located near Blackstock, Chester County, South Carolina. The original portion was built about 1841, and is a 1 1/2-story, five-bay, heavy-timber frame and weatherboard Federal style building, with a double pitched gable roof. It has two exterior end chimneys with free-standing chimney stacks and ten-foot deep, full length porches on two sides. A 1 1/2-story, five-bay addition with a full basement was added shortly after the original construction. It is one of South Carolina's surviving early stagecoach stops on a main state road, the Charlotte to Charleston Road.

It was listed on the National Register of Historic Places in 1994.
