= 1936 United States House of Representatives elections in South Carolina =

The 1936 United States House of Representatives elections in South Carolina were held on November 2, 1936, to select six Representatives for two-year terms from the state of South Carolina. All five incumbents who ran were re-elected and the open seat in the 4th congressional district was retained by the Democrats. The composition of the state delegation thus remained solely Democratic.

There was a split in the South Carolina Republican Party between the Tolbert and Seabrook factions because each side wanted to be the arbiter of the spoils system should a national Republican victory occur. Therefore, they both offered their own slate of candidates for the federal contests and they were competing against each other, not the Democrats, to show the national Republican Party that they held more sway in the state.

== 1st congressional district ==
Incumbent Democratic Congressman Thomas S. McMillan of the 1st congressional district, in office since 1925, defeated two Republican challengers.

=== General election results ===
South Carolina's 1st congressional district election results, 1936
Party	Candidate	Votes	%	±%
Democratic	Thomas S. McMillan (incumbent)	15,772	96.9	−0.8
Republican (Tolbert)	B.L. Hendrix	314	1.9	-0.4
Republican (Seabrook)	Ben Felman	193	1.2	+1.2
Majority		15,458	95.0	−0.4
Turnout		16,279		
Democratic hold				

== 2nd congressional district ==
Incumbent Democratic Congressman Hampton P. Fulmer of the 2nd congressional district, in office since 1921, defeated Gary Paschal in the Democratic primary and defeated two Republicans in the general election.

=== Democratic primary ===
Democratic primary
Candidate	Votes	%
Hampton P. Fulmer	33,578	62.5
Gary Paschal	20,172	37.5

=== General election results ===
South Carolina's 2nd congressional district election results, 1936
Party	Candidate	Votes	%	±%
Democratic	Hampton P. Fulmer (incumbent)	21,653	98.3	−0.9
Republican	Leaphart	249	1.1	+0.3
Republican	L.A. Black	130	0.6	+0.6
No party	Write-Ins	4	0.0	0.0
Majority		21,404	97.2	−1.2
Turnout		22,036		
Democratic hold				

== 3rd congressional district ==
Incumbent Democratic Congressman John C. Taylor of the 3rd congressional district, in office since 1933, defeated J. Wade Drake in the Democratic primary and two Republicans in the general election.

=== Democratic primary ===
Democratic primary
Candidate	Votes	%
John C. Taylor	39,370	68.7
J. Wade Drake	17,923	31.3

=== General election results ===
South Carolina's 3rd congressional district election results, 1936
Party	Candidate	Votes	%	±%
Democratic	John C. Taylor (incumbent)	18,983	99.0	−0.4
Republican	O.B. Menees	116	0.6	0.0
Republican	A.F. Earnes	73	0.4	+0.4
No party	Write-Ins	1	0.0	0.0
Majority		18,867	98.4	−0.4
Turnout		19,173		
Democratic hold				

== 4th congressional district special election ==
Incumbent Democratic Congressman John J. McSwain of the 4th congressional district died on August 6, 1936, and a special election was called for November 3 to be held simultaneously with the regular election. The South Carolina Democratic Party held a primary election that would choose their candidate for both the special and regular election. Gabriel H. Mahon, Jr. won the primary and was unopposed in the special election to serve out the remainder of the term.

=== Democratic primary ===
Democratic primary
Candidate	Votes	%
Gabriel H. Mahon, Jr.	19,268	29.7
Joseph R. Bryson	17,510	27.0
J.G. Leatherwood	14,557	22.5
Claude A. Taylor	13,449	20.8

Democratic primary runoff
Candidate	Votes	%	±%
Gabriel H. Mahon, Jr.	31,370	53.8	+24.1
Joseph R. Bryson	26,947	46.2	+19.2

=== General election results ===
South Carolina's 4th congressional district special election results, 1936
Party	Candidate	Votes	%	±%
Democratic	Gabriel H. Mahon, Jr.	24,715	100.0	+0.6
Majority		24,715	100.0	+1.2
Turnout		24,715		
Democratic hold				

== 4th congressional district ==
Gabriel H. Mahon, Jr., winner of the Democratic primary for both the special and regular election of the 4th congressional district, defeated two Republicans in the general election to win the term for the 75th Congress.

=== General election results ===
South Carolina's 4th congressional district election results, 1936
Party	Candidate	Votes	%	±%
Democratic	Gabriel H. Mahon, Jr.	25,468	98.9	−1.1
Republican	W.E. Murray	162	0.6	+0.6
Republican	Frank W. Faux	121	0.5	+0.5
Majority		25,306	98.3	−1.7
Turnout		25,751		
Democratic hold				

== 5th congressional district ==
Incumbent Democratic Congressman James P. Richards of the 5th congressional district, in office since 1933, defeated two Republican challengers.

=== General election results ===
South Carolina's 5th congressional district election results, 1936
Party	Candidate	Votes	%	±%
Democratic	James P. Richards (incumbent)	15,748	99.2	+0.5
Republican	C.F. Pendleton	110	0.7	−0.6
Republican	A.B. McCraw	23	0.1	+0.1
Majority		15,638	98.5	+1.1
Turnout		15,881		
Democratic hold				

== 6th congressional district ==
Incumbent Democratic Congressman Allard H. Gasque of the 6th congressional district, in office since 1923, won the Democratic primary and defeated two Republicans in the general election.

=== Democratic primary ===
Democratic primary
Candidate	Votes	%
Allard H. Gasque	28,470	62.9
James R. Turner	14,505	32.0
R.G. Blackburn	2,318	5.1

=== General election results ===
South Carolina's 6th congressional district election results, 1936
Party	Candidate	Votes	%	±%
Democratic	Allard H. Gasque (incumbent)	16,027	99.3	0.0
Republican	T.J. Karnes	71	0.5	−0.2
Republican	C.R. Davis	36	0.2	+0.2
No party	Write-Ins	1	0.0	0.0
Majority		15,956	98.8	+0.2
Turnout		16,135		
Democratic hold				

== See also ==
- United States House of Representatives elections, 1936
- United States Senate election in South Carolina, 1936
- South Carolina's congressional districts
