= 1914 United States Senate election in South Carolina =

1914 Democratic Senate primary in South Carolina
- August 25, 1914
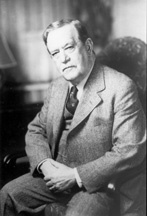

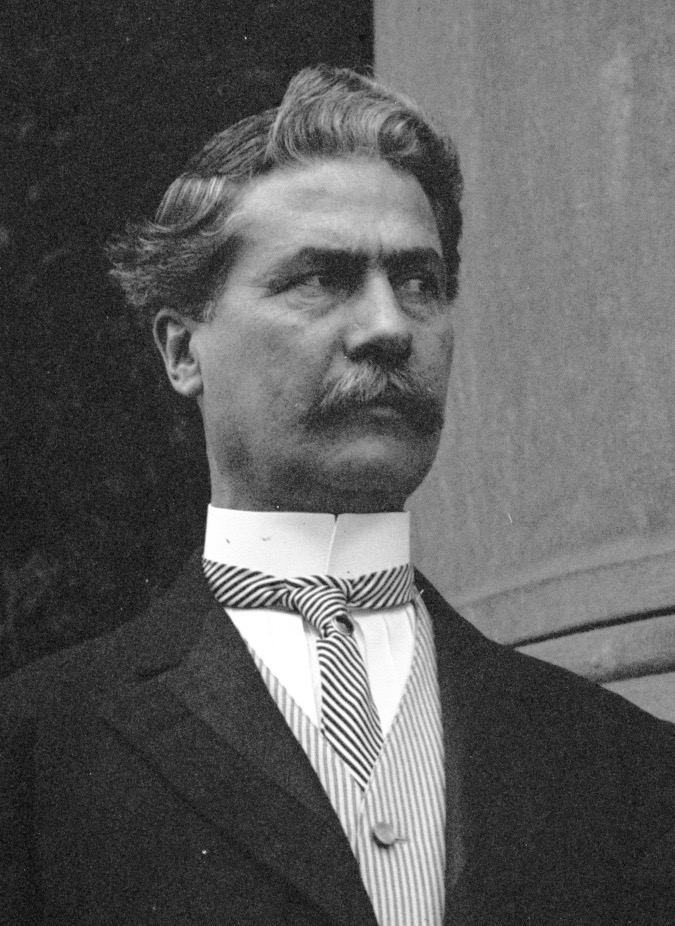
Nominee	Ellison D. Smith	Cole Blease
Party	Democratic	Democratic
Popular vote	72,256	55,908
Percentage	54.66%	42.29%
U.S. senator before election
Ellison D. Smith
Democratic
Elected U.S. Senator
Ellison D. Smith
Democratic

The 1914 United States Senate election in South Carolina was held on November 3, 1914, to select the U.S. Senator from the state of South Carolina. It was the first election in South Carolina in which the voters were able to choose the candidate in the general election. Incumbent Democratic Senator Ellison D. Smith won the Democratic primary and defeated nominal opposition in the general election to win another six-year term.

== Democratic primary ==
Coleman Livingston Blease, Governor of South Carolina from 1910 to 1914, was barred from seeking another term by the South Carolina constitution. He wanted to continue holding a public office so he challenged incumbent Senator Ellison D. Smith in the Democratic primary election for U.S. Senator. However, the voters were tired of Blease and he and those allied with him suffered defeat in the 1914 Democratic primaries on August 25.

South Carolina U.S. Senate Primary Election, 1914
Party	Candidate	Votes	%	±%
Democratic	Ellison D. Smith (incumbent)	72,256	54.66%	
Democratic	Coleman Livingston Blease	55,908	42.29%	
Democratic	Lang D. Jennings	2,400	1.82%	
Democratic	William P. Pollock	1,630	1.23%	

== General election campaign ==
Since the end of Reconstruction in 1877, the Democratic Party dominated the politics of South Carolina and its statewide candidates were never seriously challenged. Smith did not campaign for the general election as there was no chance of defeat.

=== Results ===
South Carolina U.S. Senate Election, 1914
Party	Candidate	Votes	%	±%
Democratic	Ellison D. Smith (incumbent)	32,950	99.73%	N/A
Socialist	James H. Roberts	89	0.27%	N/A
Majority		32,861	99.46%	N/A
Turnout		33,039		
Democratic hold				

== See also ==
- List of United States senators from South Carolina
- United States Senate elections, 1914
- United States House of Representatives elections in South Carolina, 1914
- South Carolina gubernatorial election, 1914
