= 1918 United States Senate special election in South Carolina =

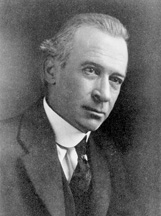
William P. Pollock

The 1918 South Carolina United States Senate special election was held on November 5, 1918, simultaneously with the regular senate election to select the U.S. Senator from the state of South Carolina to serve the remainder of the term for the 65th Congress. The election resulted from the death of Senator Benjamin Tillman on July 3, 1918. William P. Pollock won the Democratic primary and was unopposed in the general election to win the remaining four months of the term.

== Democratic primary ==
The South Carolina Democratic Party held the primary on August 27 and William P. Pollock had a slight lead, but did not garner over 50% of the vote and was forced into a runoff election against Thomas H. Peeples. On September 10, Pollock won the runoff and was thereby elected for the short term in the Senate because there was no opposition to the Democratic candidate in the general election.

Democratic Primary
Candidate	Votes	%
William P. Pollock	38,816	34.9%
Thomas H. Peeples	37,567	33.8%
Christie Benet	34,807	31.3%

Democratic Primary Runoff
Candidate	Votes	%	±%
William P. Pollock	49,920	62.4%	+27.5%
Thomas H. Peeples	30,044	37.6%	+3.8%

== General election results ==
South Carolina U.S. Senate Special Election, 1918
Party	Candidate	Votes	%	±%
Democratic	William P. Pollock	25,733	100.00%	N/A
Majority		25,733	100.00%	N/A
Turnout		25,733		
Democratic hold				

== See also ==
- List of United States senators from South Carolina
- 1918 United States Senate elections
- 1918 United States House of Representatives elections in South Carolina
- 1918 South Carolina gubernatorial election
