= 1938 United States House of Representatives elections in South Carolina =

The 1938 United States House of Representatives elections in South Carolina were held on November 8, 1938, to select six Representatives for two-year terms from the state of South Carolina. The primary elections were held on August 30 and the runoff elections were held two weeks later on September 13. Three incumbents were re-elected, but two incumbents were defeated in the Democratic primary. The three open seats were retained by the Democrats and the composition of the state delegation thus remained solely Democratic.

== 1st congressional district ==
Incumbent Democratic Congressman Thomas S. McMillan of the 1st congressional district, in office since 1925, defeated A. Russell McGowan in the Democratic primary and Republican B.L. Hendrix in the general election.

=== Democratic primary ===
Democratic primary
Candidate	Votes	%
Thomas S. McMillan	29,173	62.8
A. Russell McGowan	17,255	37.2

=== General election results ===
South Carolina's 1st congressional district election results, 1938
Party	Candidate	Votes	%	±%
Democratic	Thomas S. McMillan (incumbent)	7,649	98.2	+1.3
Republican	B.L. Hendrix	136	1.8	−1.3
No party	Write-Ins	3	0.0	0.0
Majority		7,513	96.4	+1.4
Turnout		7,788		
Democratic hold				

== 2nd congressional district ==
Incumbent Democratic Congressman Hampton P. Fulmer of the 2nd congressional district, in office since 1921, defeated former Lieutenant Governor Andrew J. Bethea in the Democratic primary and Republican S.J. Leaphart in the general election.

=== Democratic primary ===
Democratic primary
Candidate	Votes	%
Hampton P. Fulmer	42,058	71.4
Andrew J. Bethea	16,868	28.6

=== General election results ===
South Carolina's 2nd congressional district election results, 1938
Party	Candidate	Votes	%	±%
Democratic	Hampton P. Fulmer (incumbent)	7,236	98.8	+0.5
Republican	S.J. Leaphart	26	0.3	−1.4
No party	Write-Ins	63	0.9	+0.9
Majority		7,210	98.5	+1.3
Turnout		7,325		
Democratic hold				

== 3rd congressional district ==
Incumbent Democratic Congressman John C. Taylor of the 3rd congressional district, in office since 1933, was defeated in the Democratic primary by Butler B. Hare who defeated Republican O.B. Menees in the general election.

=== Democratic primary ===
Democratic primary
Candidate	Votes	%
John C. Taylor	22,164	40.6
Butler B. Hare	18,556	34.0
Theo H. Vaughn	10,407	19.1
Robert E. McCaslan	3,445	6.3

Democratic primary runoff
Candidate	Votes	%	±%
Butler B. Hare	29,852	55.7	+21.7
John C. Taylor	23,732	44.3	+3.7

=== General election results ===
South Carolina's 3rd congressional district election results, 1938
Party	Candidate	Votes	%	±%
Democratic	Butler B. Hare	10,028	99.6	+0.6
Republican	O.B. Menees	43	0.4	−0.6
Majority		9,985	99.2	+0.8
Turnout		10,071		
Democratic hold				

== 4th congressional district ==
Incumbent Democratic Congressman Gabriel H. Mahon, Jr. of the 4th congressional district, in office since 1937, was defeated in the Democratic primary by Joseph R. Bryson who defeated Republican H.A. Costner in the general election. The first primary had the two candidates only separated by 8 votes so the South Carolina Democratic Party Executive Committee ordered a new race instead of a recount, which Bryson clearly won.

=== Democratic primary ===
1st Democratic primary
Candidate	Votes	%
Joseph R. Bryson	31,634	50.0
Gabriel H. Mahon, Jr.	31,626	50.0

2nd Democratic primary
Candidate	Votes	%
Joseph R. Bryson	35,948	54.5
Gabriel H. Mahon, Jr.	29,967	45.5

=== General election results ===
South Carolina's 4th congressional district election results, 1938
Party	Candidate	Votes	%	±%
Democratic	Joseph R. Bryson	8,995	99.4	+0.5
Republican	H.A. Costner	58	0.6	−0.5
Majority		8,937	98.8	+0.5
Turnout		9,053		
Democratic hold				

== 5th congressional district ==
Incumbent Democratic Congressman James P. Richards of the 5th congressional district, in office since 1933, defeated Republican challenger A.B. McCraw.

=== General election results ===
South Carolina's 5th congressional district election results, 1938
Party	Candidate	Votes	%	±%
Democratic	James P. Richards (incumbent)	6,191	99.8	+0.6
Republican	A.B. McCraw	13	0.2	−0.6
Majority		6,178	99.6	+1.1
Turnout		6,204		
Democratic hold				

== 6th congressional district ==
Incumbent Democratic Congresswoman Elizabeth Hawley Gasque of the 6th congressional district succeeded her husband, Allard H. Gasque, in office upon his death in 1938 and she did not seek re-election. John L. McMillan won the Democratic primary and defeated Republican W.S. Thompson in the general election.

=== Democratic primary ===
Democratic primary
Candidate	Votes	%
Lloyd Ford	19,581	35.3
John L. McMillan	15,578	28.1
James R. Turner	7,183	12.9
Jerome P. Pate	5,771	10.4
Earl Ellerbe	4,809	8.7
D.F. Hogan	2,558	4.6

Democratic primary runoff
Candidate	Votes	%	±%
John L. McMillan	27,083	51.9	+23.8
Lloyd Ford	25,068	48.1	+12.8

=== General election results ===
South Carolina's 6th congressional district election results, 1938
Party	Candidate	Votes	%	±%
Democratic	John L. McMillan	5,707	99.2	−0.1
Republican	W.S. Thompson	48	0.8	+0.1
Majority		5,659	98.4	−0.4
Turnout		5,755		
Democratic hold				

== See also ==
- 1938 United States House of Representatives elections
- 1938 United States Senate election in South Carolina
- 1938 South Carolina gubernatorial election
- South Carolina's congressional districts
