= 1938 United States Senate election in South Carolina =

Election event

1938 Democratic Senate primary election in South Carolina
- August 30, 1938
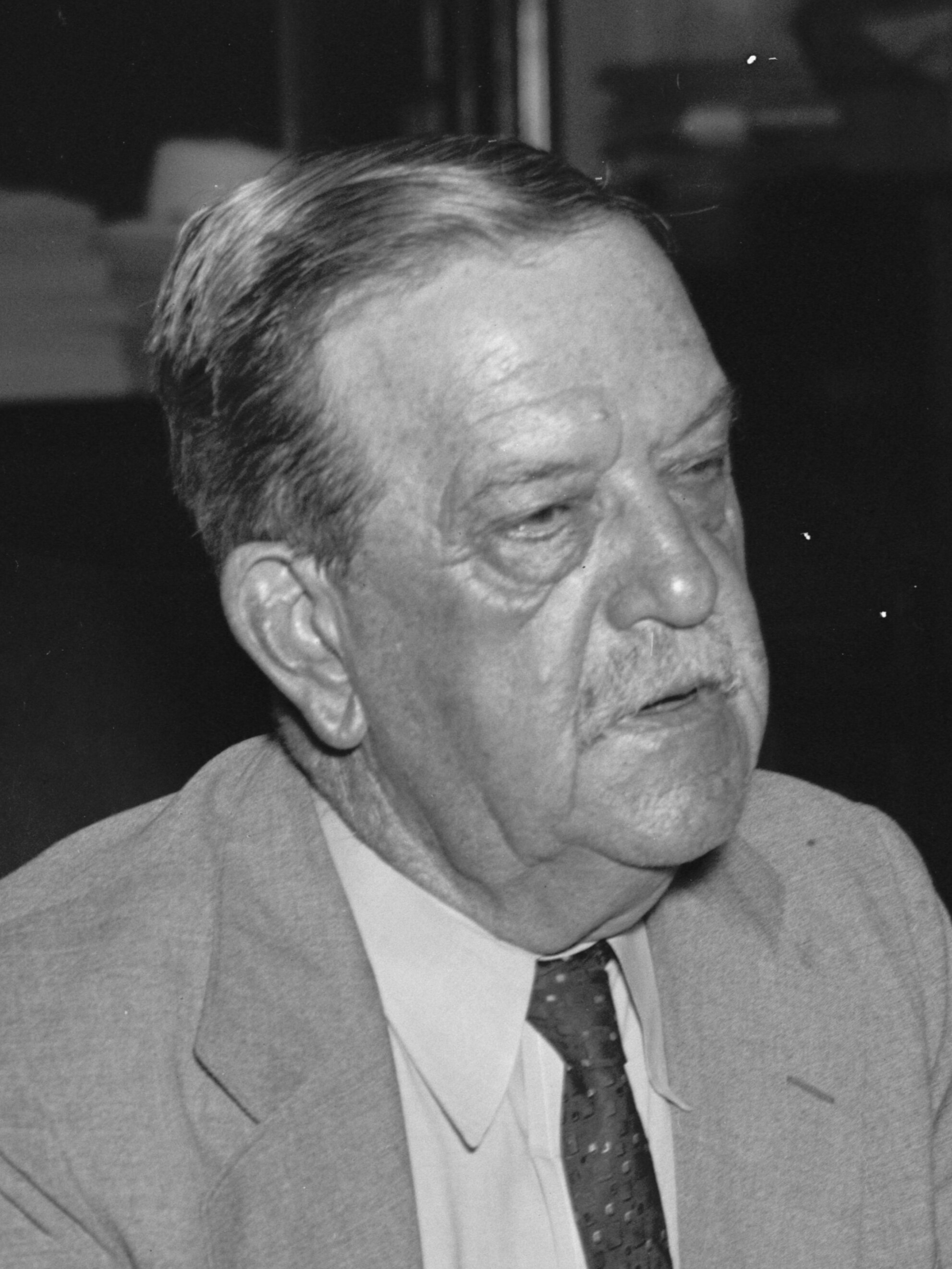

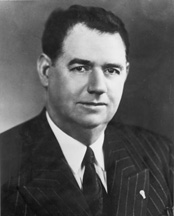
| Nominee | Ellison D. Smith | Olin D. Johnston |
| Party | Democratic | Democratic |
| Popular vote | 186,579 | 150,437 |
| Percentage | 55.36% | 44.64% |
- County results Smith: 50–60% 60–70% 70–80% Johnston: 50–60% 60–70%
U.S. senator before election
Ellison D. Smith
Democratic
Elected U.S. Senator
Ellison D. Smith
Democratic

The 1938 South Carolina United States Senate election was held on November 8, 1938, to select the U.S. Senator from the state of South Carolina. Incumbent Democratic Senator Ellison D. Smith defeated Governor Olin D. Johnston in the Democratic primary. The general election was contested, but a victory by Smith was never in doubt.

== Democratic primary ==
=== Candidates ===
==== Declared ====
- Ellison D. Smith, incumbent Senator since 1909
- Olin D. Johnston, Governor of South Carolina

==== Withdrew ====
- Edgar Allan Brown, State Senator

=== Campaign ===
Senator Ellison D. Smith was marked by President Franklin D. Roosevelt for defeat because he had vociferously opposed many policies of the New Deal. Governor Olin D. Johnston announced at the White House that he was going to challenge Smith in the Democratic primary and would be fully supportive of every Roosevelt policy. State Senator Edgar Allan Brown also threw his hat into the ring pledging that he would back Roosevelt and would be the most effective candidate in bringing home the bacon.

Johnston's complete backing of Roosevelt earned him the endorsements of several liberal organizations, such as the Labor Nonpartisan League (LNPL) and the Congress of Industrial Organizations (CIO), but these two organizations were frowned upon in South Carolina. They advanced racial integration, advocated labor militancy and were believed to have been controlled by Communists. Smith hammered Johnston for having these ties claiming that Johnston "endorsed the nigger, and went one hundred percent for anything belonging to the New Deal, right or wrong, because he does not have guts to disagree." Smith then boasted of his endorsement by the racially exclusive American Federation of Labor (AFL) and stress that a vote for Johnston would embolster the CIO to force the employment of blacks in factories alongside whites. Though Johnston did not defend rights for African Americans, he would largely ignore the issue of white supremacy, believing that improving the public welfare was more important, while Smith had campaigned for over thirty years on a two plank platform to "keep the Negro down and the price of cotton up" and had further demonstrated he intended to continue the fight to preserve racial segregation when he walked out of the 1936 Democratic National Convention after learning that a black minister was going to deliver the invocation.

On August 11, Roosevelt's train stopped in Greenville to a crowd of 15,000 with the three candidates aboard. He had spoken the previous day in Georgia against the re-election of Senator Walter F. George and was expected to make an endorsement of Olin Johnston at Greenville. Roosevelt criticized Smith for his 1937 speech in the Senate that South Carolinians were willing to work for fifty cents a day. Yet before Roosevelt could finish his address, the train started to leave. Smith trumpeted up the fact that Roosevelt never explicitly endorsed Johnston and responded to Roosevelt's charge that his Senate speech was taken out of context. Johnston claimed that it was insinuated by Roosevelt whom he supported and he made it clear that he boarded the President's train in Georgia, whereas the other two candidates boarded just outside Greenville. Brown felt slighted by the President's brief remarks and withdrew from the race on August 27.

Smith was supported by two powerful figures in South Carolina politics: Senator James F. Byrnes and his friend Charleston mayor Burnet Maybank. Unlike Smith, Byrnes was a well known pro-Roosevelt New Dealer and was also renominated in the 1936 Democratic primary by a margin of over 87%. Heeding advice from Byrnes, Maybank declined to run for Smith's Senate seat and instead ran a successful campaign for Governor that year. In spite of his strong support of almost all of Roosevelt's New Deal legislation, Byrnes opposed some of Roosevelt's labor legislation, which Johnston outspokenly supported, such as the recently passed Fair Labor Standards Act of 1938. Byrnes and Maybank, however, did not like Smith and only endorsed him because they envisioned that he would retire in 1944 and Maybank, having served a term as governor, would easily win his seat. Byrnes and Maybank also envisioned that after Maybank was elected to Smith's Senate seat, they would then manage to build a strong political machine that would control the state's political scene.

=== Polling ===
| Poll source | Date published | Edgar Allan Brown | Olin Johnston | Ellison Smith |
|---|---|---|---|---|
| American Institute of Public Opinion | August 29, 1938 | 13% | 36% | 51% |
| American Institute of Public Opinion | August 29, 1938 | — | 43% | 57% |

=== Results ===
The primary election was held on August 30 and Smith won a commanding victory over Johnston. In order to win, Johnston needed to rack up huge margins in the Upstate, but the two candidates broke even. Smith overwhelmingly won in the rural areas because Johnston's constant emphasis of his labor roots made the agriculture voters feel that he did not care about their interests. It was also believed that at this point in time, however, that the large majority of people of South Carolina had become fed up with Smith and that he would've lost the primary if not for Roosevelt's interference or if he had done more to either please the state's influential textile mill owners or address the issue of preserving racial segregation in the state. In 1940, a survey found that there was no great admiration for Smith among the people in South Carolina and that his victory in the 1938 primary was symbolic because it showed that an unpopular person was elected because "the president picked him out as the victim."

Democratic Primary
| Candidate | Votes | % |
|---|---|---|
| Ellison D. Smith | 186,579 | 55.4 |
| Olin D. Johnston | 150,437 | 44.6 |

== General election ==
=== Campaign ===
Despite a Republican candidate being nominated for the general election contest, there was never any possibility that Smith would be defeated. The Republican Party was nothing more than a patronage institution and at the time was widely despised by the South Carolinians for bringing destruction to the state during Reconstruction.

=== Results ===
Results by county Smith: >90%

South Carolina U.S. Senate Election, 1938
| Party | Candidate | Votes | % | ±% |
|---|---|---|---|---|
| Democratic | Ellison D. Smith (incumbent) | 45,351 | 98.89% | +0.75% |
| Republican | J.D.E. Meyer | 508 | 1.11% | −0.75% |
| No party | Write-Ins | 2 | 0.00% | N/A |
| Majority | | 44,843 | 97.78% | +1.49% |
| Turnout | | 45,861 | | |
| Democratic hold | | | | |

== See also ==
- List of United States senators from South Carolina
- United States Senate elections, 1938
- United States House of Representatives elections in South Carolina, 1938
- South Carolina gubernatorial election, 1938
