= 1926 United States Senate election in South Carolina =

1926 Democratic Senate primary in South Carolina
- August 31 and September 14, 1926
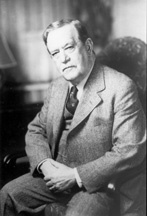

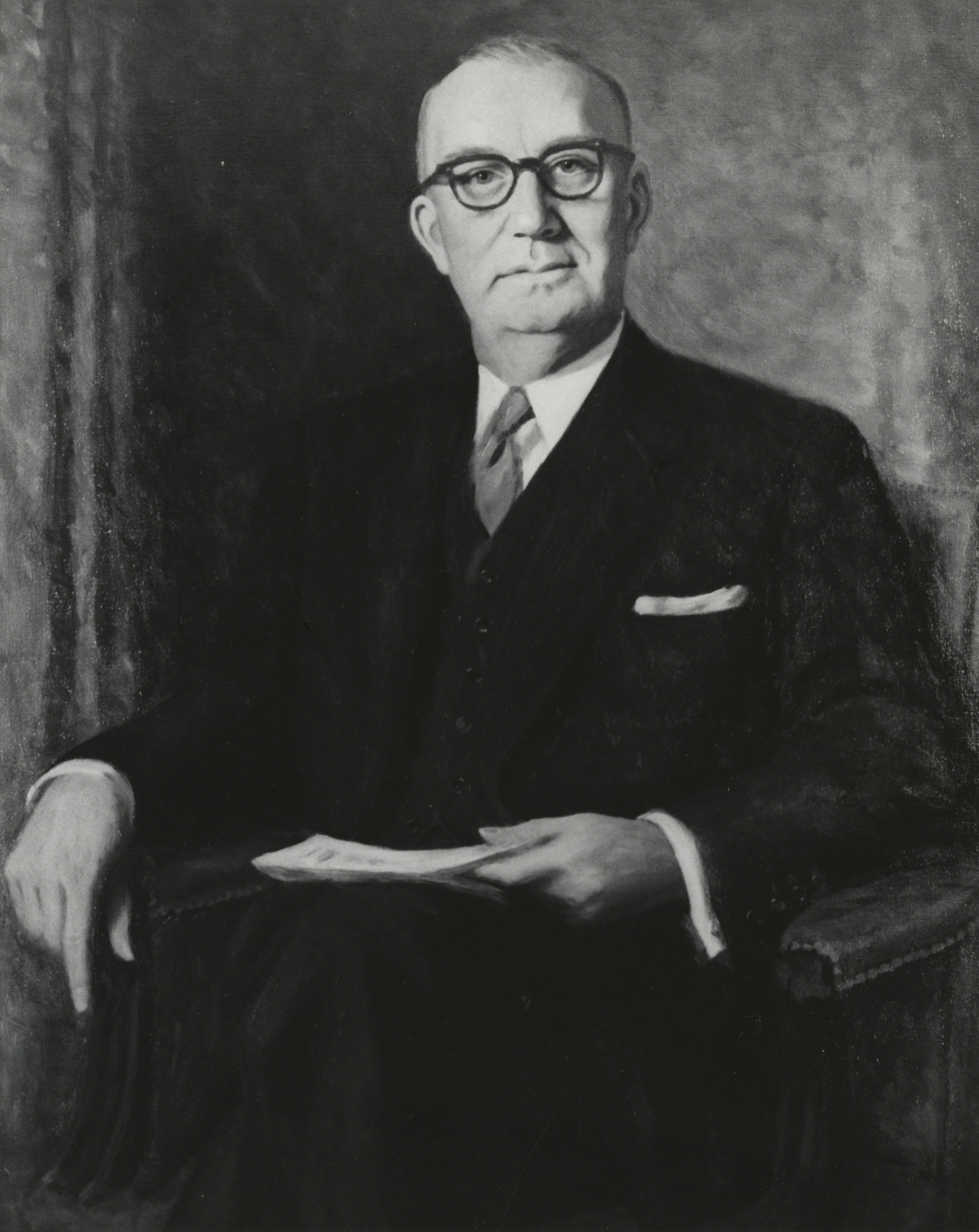
Nominee	Ellison D. Smith	Edgar Allan Brown
Party	Democratic	Democratic
Popular vote	72,015 primary 82,783 runoff	65,331 primary 77,559 runoff
Percentage	41.99% primary 51.62% runoff	38.10% primary 48.38% runoff
- Smith: 30–40% 40–50% 50–60% 60–70% 70–80% Brown: 30–40% 40–50% 50–60% 60–70% 70–80% Dial: 60–70%
U.S. senator before election
Ellison D. Smith
Democratic
Elected U.S. Senator
Ellison D. Smith
Democratic

The 1926 South Carolina United States Senate election was held on November 2, 1926, to select the U.S. Senator from the state of South Carolina. Incumbent Democratic Senator Ellison D. Smith won the Democratic primary and was unopposed in the general election to win another six-year term.

== Democratic primary ==
=== Candidates ===
- Edgar Allan Brown, Speaker of the South Carolina House of Representatives
- Nathaniel B. Dial, former U.S. Senator from 1919 to 1925
- Ellison D. Smith, incumbent Senator since 1909

Senator Ellison D. Smith was opposed in the Democratic primary by state Representative Edgar Allan Brown of Barnwell County. Smith was the leader in the first primary election on August 31 and won the runoff election two weeks later on September 14. There was no opposition to the Democratic candidate in the general election so Smith was elected to another six-year term in the Senate.

=== Results ===
Democratic Primary
Candidate	Votes	%
Ellison D. Smith	72,015	42.0
Edgar Allan Brown	65,331	38.1
Nathaniel B. Dial	34,144	19.9

=== Runoff ===
Democratic Primary Runoff
Candidate	Votes	%	±%
Ellison D. Smith	82,783	51.6	+9.6
Edgar Allan Brown	77,559	48.4	+10.3

== General election results ==
South Carolina U.S. Senate Election, 1926
Party	Candidate	Votes	%	±%
Democratic	Ellison D. Smith (incumbent)	14,560	100.00%	0.00%
Majority		14,560	100.00%	0.00%
Turnout		14,560		
Democratic hold				

65+% won by Smith

== See also ==
- List of United States senators from South Carolina
- 1926 United States Senate elections
- 1926 United States House of Representatives elections in South Carolina
- 1926 South Carolina gubernatorial election
