= 1932 United States Senate election in South Carolina =

1932 South Carolina Democratic Senate primary
- September 13, 1932
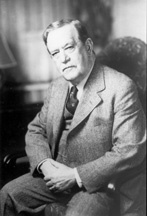

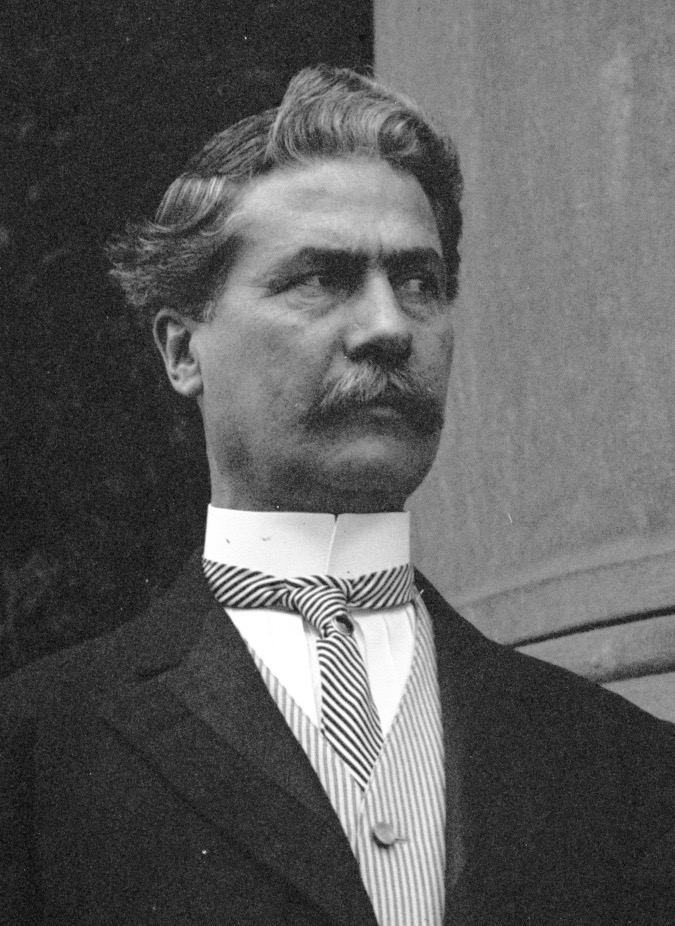
Nominee	Ellison D. Smith	Cole Blease
Party	Democratic	Democratic
Popular vote	150,468	114,840
Percentage	56.71%	43.29%
- County results Smith: 50–60% 60–70% 70–80% >90% Blease: 50–60% 60–70%
U.S. senator before election
Ellison D. Smith
Democratic
Elected U.S. Senator
Ellison D. Smith
Democratic

The 1932 United States Senate election in South Carolina was held on November 8.

On September 13, incumbent Senator Ellison D. Smith defeated former Senator Cole Blease in the Democratic primary with 56.7% of the vote.

At this time, South Carolina was a one-party state, and the Democratic nomination was tantamount to victory. Smith won the November general election without any effort.

== Democratic primary ==
=== Candidates ===
- Coleman Livingston Blease, former U.S. Senator and Governor of South Carolina
- Leon W. Harris, candidate for U.S. Senate in 1930
- Ellison D. Smith, incumbent Senator since 1909
- Ashton Hilliard Williams, former State Senator from Lake City

=== Results ===
Democratic Primary
Candidate	Votes	%
Ellison D. Smith	100,270	37.0
Coleman Livingston Blease	81,297	30.0
Ashton H. Williams	48,084	17.7
Leon W. Harris	41,478	15.3

=== Runoff ===
Democratic Primary Runoff
Candidate	Votes	%	±%
Ellison D. Smith	150,468	56.7	+19.7
Coleman Livingston Blease	114,840	43.3	+13.3

== General election ==
=== Campaign ===
Since the end of Reconstruction in 1877, the Democratic Party dominated the politics of South Carolina and its statewide candidates were never seriously challenged. Smith did not campaign for the general election as there was no chance of defeat. Republican Clara Harrigal, an Aiken businesswoman and Republican National Committeewoman, was the first woman to run for statewide office in South Carolina.

=== Results ===
South Carolina U.S. Senate Election, 1932
Party	Candidate	Votes	%	±%
Democratic	Ellison D. Smith (incumbent)	104,472	98.14%	−1.86%
Republican	Clara Harrigal	1,976	1.86%	N/A
Majority		102,496	96.29%	−3.71%
Turnout		106,448		
Democratic hold				

== See also ==
- List of United States senators from South Carolina
- 1932 United States Senate elections
- 1932 United States House of Representatives elections in South Carolina
