= Ellison D. Smith =

American politician (1864–1944)

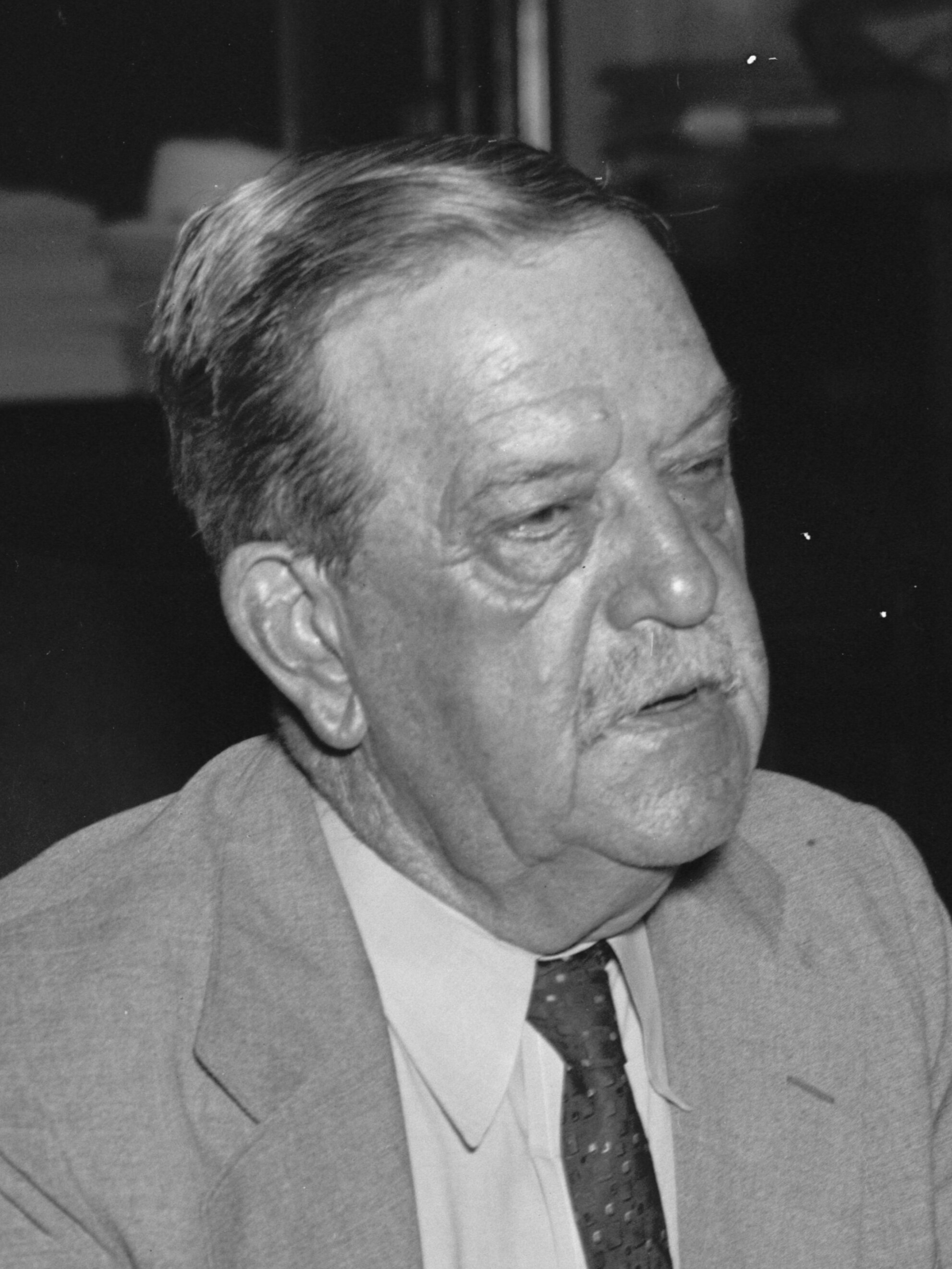
- Smith in 1937

United States Senator from South Carolina
- In office March 4, 1909 – November 17, 1944
- Preceded by: Frank B. Gary
- Succeeded by: Wilton E. Hall

Chairman of the Committee on Agriculture and Forestry
- In office 1933–1944
- Preceded by: Charles L. McNary
- Succeeded by: Elmer Thomas

Chairman of the Committee on Interstate Commerce
- In office 1924–1925
- Preceded by: Albert B. Cummins
- Succeeded by: James E. Watson
- In office 1917–1919
- Preceded by: Francis G. Newlands
- Succeeded by: Albert B. Cummins

Member of the South Carolina House of Representatives from Sumter County
- In office January 12, 1897 – January 8, 1901

Personal details
- Born: Ellison DuRant Smith; August 1, 1864 Lynchburg, South Carolina, U.S.
- Died: November 17, 1944 (aged 80) Lynchburg, South Carolina, U.S.
- Party: Democratic
- Spouses: Martha Cornelia Moorer (m. 1892; died 1893) Annie Brunson Farley (m. 1906)
- Children: 5

Ellison DuRant Smith (August 1, 1864 – November 17, 1944) was an American cotton planter, lobbyist, and Democratic Party politician who represented South Carolina in the United States Senate from 1909 until 1944. Smith was the last senator formally elected by the legislature before the Seventeenth Amendment to the United States Constitution to leave the Senate.

Smith was widely known for his virulently racist and segregationist views, his advocacy of white supremacy, and his support for the Southern cotton industry, earning him the nickname "Cotton Ed".

== Early life ==
Smith was born near Lynchburg, South Carolina, the youngest child of William Hankin Smith and Mary Isabella Smith (née McLeod), at his ancestral home, Tanglewood Plantation (formerly Smith's Grove). Throughout his life, he would reside in Tanglewood. Smith attended the University of South Carolina, where he was a member of the Phi Kappa Psi fraternity, and graduated from Wofford College in 1889.

Smith served in the South Carolina House of Representatives from 1896 to 1900. He was unsuccessful in his bid to become a member of the U.S. House of Representatives in 1900. In 1901, Smith helped organize the Farmer's Protective Association and eventually became one of the principal figures in the formation of the Southern Cotton Association in 1905. Between the years 1905 and 1908, he served as a field agent and general organizer in the cotton protective movement. Smith received the nickname "Cotton Ed" after he declared: "Cotton is king and white is supreme."

== Election to the U.S. Senate ==
Smith was elected to the United States Senate in 1908. He was re-elected five times, although from 1920 until 1944, he had four close elections, with three of them leading to run-off elections because he failed to capture a majority. Smith never won more than 61 percent in Democratic Party primaries during that time. During his time in Congress, he had a goal to "keep the Negroes down and the price of cotton up." Known for being a reputed showman, Smith would publicly promote this goal by riding to Washington on a wagon-load of cotton waving the banner of white supremacy. He also developed a reputation for having a violent temper while speaking in Congress and would at times stand on his feet and try to get the floor speaker's attention by repeatedly hacking his armchair with a penknife whenever the speaker angered him. Smith was not fond of his fellow Senators and liked to describe the Senate Chamber as "the Cave of the Winds."

== Senate career ==
Between 1909 and 1933, Smith was regarded as a fairly effective senator, though admittedly not of the first rank. A tireless champion of agriculture, he supported some planks of the Progressive Era, having written a small part of them. He sponsored the Muscle Shoals project, a forerunner to the Tennessee Valley Authority. During this time Smith's policies were "a curious mixture of conservatism and liberalism". He was a loyal supporter of President Woodrow Wilson and his New Freedom agenda especially regarding agriculture supporting the Smith–Lever Act of 1914, Smith–Hughes Act, the Warehouse Act of 1916, Federal Farm Loan Act, and Federal Aid Road Act of 1916. His passage of the Cotton Futures Act earned him the nickname "Cotton" Ed Smith. Smith, however, would not favor legislation he felt would largely diversify the Southern economy, reduce the need for the vast presence of the plantation system in the South, or endanger the old Southern way of life. He also supported the Clayton Act, the Federal Trade Commission, the Underwood tariff, and the Adamson Act. He opposed the Keating–Owen Act which prohibited child labor.

Smith, reflecting the xenophobic views of constituents, sponsored numerous bills restricting immigration culminating in the Immigration Act of 1917 that passed over President Wilson's veto. Smith spoke out in support of the Immigration Act of 1924, which limited emigration from Southern and Eastern Europe and effectively entrapped European Jews in the feverish atmosphere of emergent fascism.

During the First World War he supported most of the war time actions of President Wilson but prevented attempts by the President to impose price controls on cotton. After the war he supported the League of Nations and the Treaty of Versailles.

Smith opposed the women's suffrage movement, and specifically the Nineteenth Amendment to the United States Constitution. Tying the amendment to black suffrage, he warned on the Senate floor,

Here is exactly the identical same amendment applied to the other half of the Negro race. The southern man who votes for the Susan B. Anthony Amendment votes to ratify the Fifteenth Amendment.

In the 1930s, Smith became Chairman of the Senate Committee on Agriculture and Forestry and would imperiously summon the fellow Senators on the committee by saying

Tell those butt-heads we will assemble tomorrow morning. (When he spoke, Smith would usually chew tobacco and keep a spittoon next to him.)

Time called Smith a "conscientious objector to the 20th Century." One observer claimed he "taxed neither his brain nor the voters with a new issue." He had at first welcomed US President Franklin Roosevelt but soon emerged as an opponent to the New Deal, which he dubbed as "the Jackass Age" when he noticed that Roosevelt's programs were leading the Southern economy in a new direction. Although he voted for part of the draft of the Revenue Act of 1935 he voted against the final bill, due to the highly progressive rates. In 1935, a group of reformist officials in the Agriculture Department proposed a directive that would ensure that Southern landlords actually paid their sharecroppers for their labor, which most of them did not. Smith stormed into the office of the author of the directive, Alger Hiss, and shouted: "Young fella, you can't do this to my niggers, paying checks to them. They don't know what to do with the money. The money should come to me. I'll take care of them".

At the 1936 Democratic National Convention in Philadelphia, Smith walked out of the convention hall once he saw that a black minister, Marshall L. Shepard, was going to deliver the invocation. At the sight of Shepard, Smith shouted: "By God, he's as black as melted midnight! Get outa my way. This mongrel meeting ain't no place for a white man! I don't want any blue-gummed, slew-footed Senegambian praying for me politically". Shepard's response to the incident was to say "it was just a sign the good brother needs more prayer."

Smith opposed a Federal minimum wage; he filibustered it in the 1938 Fair Labor Standards Act, saying "South Carolinians are willing to work for less than 50 cents/hour." In common with other Southern senators, Smith was vigorously opposed to the Fair Labor Standards Act, believing that a national minimum wage of 40 cents/per hour would undermine the Southern economy, which was based upon having lower wages than could be found anywhere else in the nation. Roosevelt's Attorney General, Homer Stille Cummings wrote in his diary: "Southern Senators actually froth at the mouth when the subject [of a national minimum wage] is mentioned". Smith's opposition to the New Deal led to Roosevelt's decision to make an unsuccessful attempt to have him defeated in the 1938 primary by supporting the candidacy of Governor Olin D. Johnston. During a campaign speech, Roosevelt announced that "no man can live on 50 cents a day" and appealed to the people of South Carolina to replace Smith with Johnston. Smith called Roosevelt a "Yankee carpetbagger" and ran a campaign depicting himself as the defender of traditional Southern values. Standing under a statue of the Confederate general Wade Hampton, Smith declared "No man dares to come into South Carolina and try to dictate to the sons of those men who held high the hands of Lee and Hampton". Smith billed himself as "Roosevelt's worse enemy" and vowed to stop the New Deal.

Smith won re-election in a close race in that year, thanks mainly to the unpopularity of Roosevelt's interfering in the primary, Johnston's inability to please either the state's powerful textile mill owners or staunch white supremacists and an endorsement from Smith's fellow South Carolina senator, James F. Byrnes, a highly popular outspoken New Dealer who had been re-elected in 1936 with over 87% of the vote. Byrnes, however, despised Smith and only endorsed him because he was opposed to Johnston's strong support for Roosevelt's new push for vast labor reform, which was evident in the Fair Labor Standards Act. He hoped that Smith would retire in 1944 and his friend Burnet R. Maybank, the mayor of Charleston who was running for governor of South Carolina that year, would then go on to win Smith's Senate seat and build a powerful political machine with Byrnes that would control the South Carolina political scene.

While the 1938 election would mark the first time since 1914 where "Cotton Ed" faced no runoff, it was also believed that the vast majority of the people in South Carolina at this point in time were fed up with Smith, who would probably have easily lost the primary if Roosevelt had not interfered. In 1940, a survey found that there was no great admiration for Smith among the people in South Carolina and that his 1938 victory was symbolic because it showed that an unpopular person was elected because "the president picked him out as the victim."

During World War II, Smith opposed the national war mobilization efforts, which consisted of programs that developed a vast number of factories across the states that manufactured and supplied the U.S. military with munitions, metal, fuel and other materials needed in order to win the war. During this time, the aged senator would violently criticize Americans for supporting both the war effort and the New Deal, and even supported Republican Thomas E. Dewey in the 1944 presidential election.

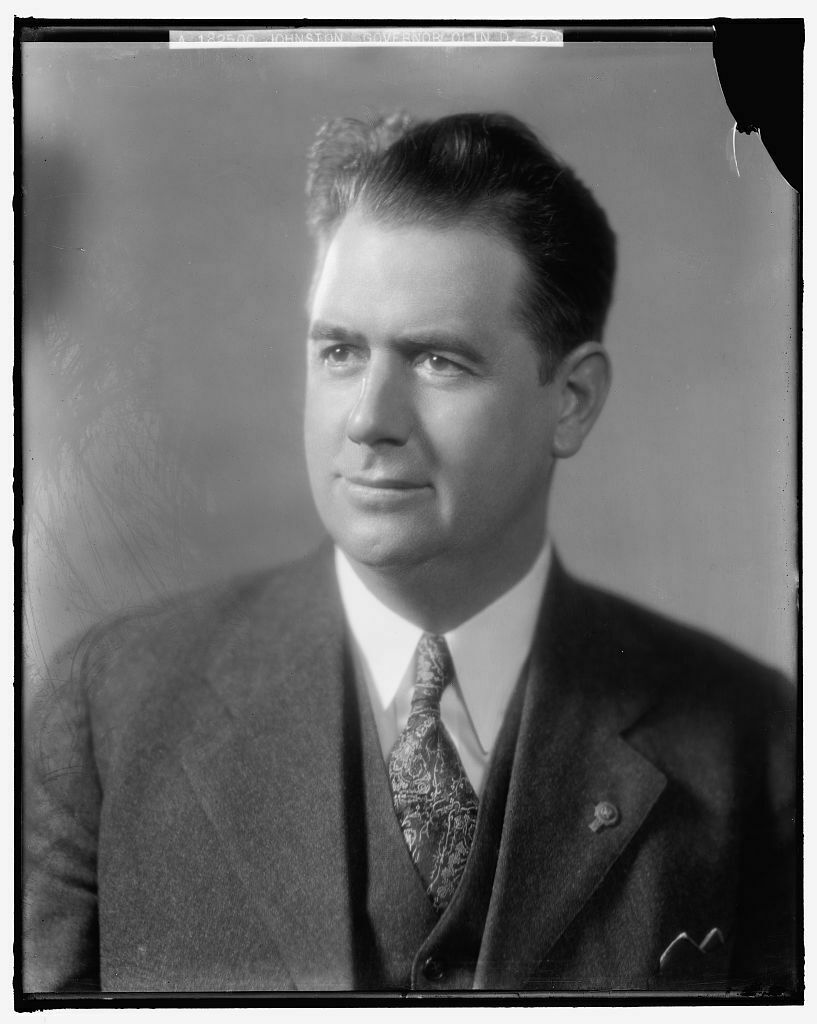
Governor Olin D. Johnston, a supporter of Franklin D. Roosevelt's labor reforms, unseated Smith in 1944 shortly before Smith's death in office.

=== 1944 election defeat ===
In 1944, Olin D. Johnston again challenged Smith in the Democratic primary. During the campaign, Johnston, once again governor of South Carolina, was strongly supportive of Roosevelt's foreign policy, but was now lukewarm towards the New Deal and was able to snatch the "flag of white supremacy" from Smith by boasting how he countered the U.S. Supreme Court's recent Smith v. Allwright decision, which ruled that racial segregation in state primaries was unconstitutional, by passing a series of laws making the South Carolina Democratic Party a private club which could keep blacks from voting in the state's primary. During the campaign, Smith presented himself as an aged and tired old man and during at least one debate with Johnston, he spoke for only a few minutes and then played a recording of a speech he had made six years earlier. Johnston would go on to win the primary with over 55 percent of the vote, thus achieving the majority needed to avoid a run-off, and Smith would only receive just over 35 percent of the vote. After hearing word of his defeat on his 2,500-acre farm near Lynchburg, Smith stood up in frustration and said "Well, I guess I better go out and look at the pigs."

== Personal life and death ==
He first married at the age of 28 in 1892 to Martha Cornelia Moorer (1865–1893) of St. George, South Carolina. She died giving birth to their son Martius Ellison in 1893. In 1912, at age 19, Martius was accidentally shot by his own gun while drinking water at the barnyard well. He died five days later.

In 1906, Ellison married Annie Brunson Farley (1882–1958). Her uncle, Henry Farley, is widely credited with firing the first shot in the Confederate bombardment of Fort Sumter, initiating the American Civil War. He later served under J. E. B. Stuart, and died fighting in the Civil War. Ellison and Annie had four children of their own, two boys and two girls:

- Their eldest daughter, Anna, was married to L.L. Smith, vice president of Kohler Plumbing Co. of Wisconsin.
- Isobel Smith Lawton moved to Florence, South Carolina, when she married.
- Ellison DuRant, Jr. married Vivian Manning, daughter of Governor John Lawrence Manning.
- Charles Saxon Farley, a past member of the South Carolina legislature from Lee County, married Laura Douglas. Laura was the daughter of Oscar Douglas (co-founder of the F.W. Woolworth empire).

On November 17, 1944, a month and a half before the end of his term, Smith died at Tanglewood Plantation in the same bed in which he was born. He is buried at St. Luke's Cemetery near Wisacky in Lee County.

== See also ==
- List of members of the United States Congress who died in office (1900–1949)

Party political offices
First	Democratic nominee for Senator from South Carolina (Class 3); 1914, 1920, 1926, 1932, 1938	Succeeded by Olin D. Johnston
U.S. Senate
Preceded by Frank B. Gary	U.S. senator (Class 3) from South Carolina; March 4, 1909 – November 17, 1944; Served alongside: Benjamin Tillman, Christie Benet, William P. Pollock, Nathaniel B. Dial, Coleman Livingston Blease, James F. Byrnes, Alva M. Lumpkin, Roger C. Peace, Burnet R. Maybank	Succeeded by Wilton E. Hall
Honorary titles
Preceded by William E. Borah; Idaho	Dean of the United States Senate; January 19, 1940 – November 17, 1944	Succeeded by Kenneth McKellar; Tennessee
