= List of United States senators from South Carolina =

Current delegation

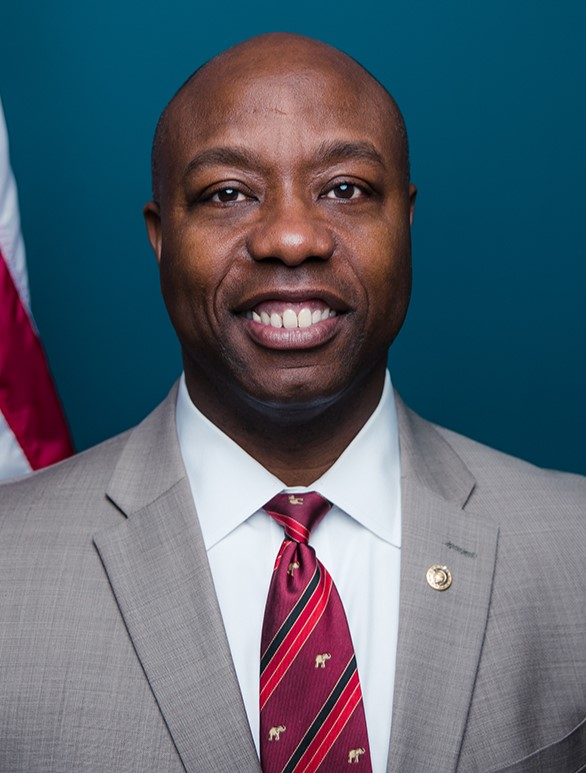
Tim Scott (R)

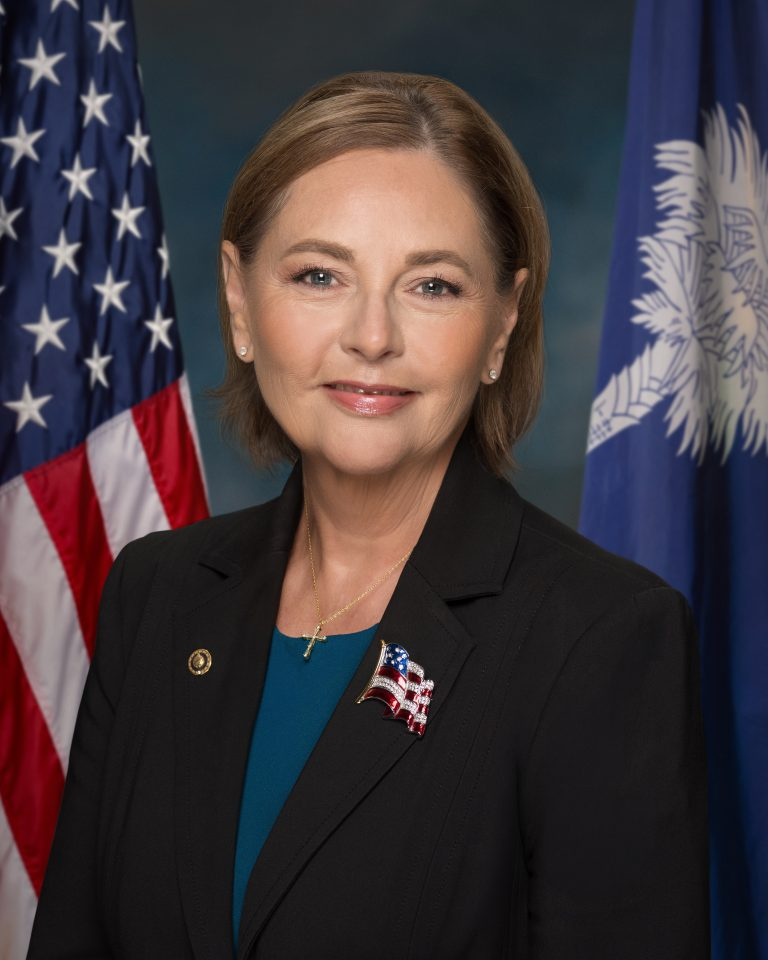
Darline Graham (R)

(ordered by seniority)

South Carolina ratified the United States Constitution on May 23, 1788. Its Senate seats were declared vacant in July 1861 owing to its secession from the Union. They were again filled from July 1868. The state's current U.S. senators are Tim Scott and Darline Graham. Darline's Senate seat used to belong to her brother, Lindsey Graham, who died in office after serving for 23 years. Strom Thurmond was the state's longest-serving senator (1954–1956, 1956–2003), which included a brief interrupted period.

== List of senators ==
Class 2 Class 2 senators belong to the electoral cycle that most recently had regular elections in 2008, 2014, 2020, and 2026. The next election will be in 2032.						C	Class 3 Class 3 senators belong to the electoral cycle that most recently had regular elections in 2004, 2010, 2016, and 2022. The next election will be in 2028.					
#	Senator	Party	Dates in office	Electoral history	T	C	T	Electoral history	Dates in office	Party	Senator	#
1	Pierce Butler (Charleston)	Pro-Admin.	Mar 4, 1789 – Oct 25, 1796	Elected in 1789.	1	1st	1	Elected in 1789. Retired.	Mar 4, 1789 – Mar 3, 1795	Pro-Admin.	Ralph Izard (Charleston)	1
1	Pierce Butler (Charleston)	Anti- Admin.	Mar 4, 1789 – Oct 25, 1796	Elected in 1789.	1	2nd	1	Elected in 1789. Retired.	Mar 4, 1789 – Mar 3, 1795	Pro-Admin.	Ralph Izard (Charleston)	1
1	Pierce Butler (Charleston)	Anti- Admin.	Mar 4, 1789 – Oct 25, 1796	Re-elected in 1793. Resigned.	2	3rd	1	Elected in 1789. Retired.	Mar 4, 1789 – Mar 3, 1795	Pro-Admin.	Ralph Izard (Charleston)	1
1	Pierce Butler (Charleston)	Democratic- Republican	Mar 4, 1789 – Oct 25, 1796	Re-elected in 1793. Resigned.	2	4th	2	Elected in 1794 or 1795. Lost re-election.	Mar 4, 1795 – Mar 3, 1801	Federalist	Jacob Read (Charleston)	2
Vacant			Oct 25, 1796 – Dec 8, 1796		2	4th	2	Elected in 1794 or 1795. Lost re-election.	Mar 4, 1795 – Mar 3, 1801	Federalist	Jacob Read (Charleston)	2
2	John Hunter (Newberry County)	Democratic- Republican	Dec 8, 1796 – Nov 26, 1798	Elected to finish Butler's term. Resigned.	2	4th	2	Elected in 1794 or 1795. Lost re-election.	Mar 4, 1795 – Mar 3, 1801	Federalist	Jacob Read (Charleston)	2
2	John Hunter (Newberry County)	Democratic- Republican	Dec 8, 1796 – Nov 26, 1798	Elected to finish Butler's term. Resigned.	2	5th	2	Elected in 1794 or 1795. Lost re-election.	Mar 4, 1795 – Mar 3, 1801	Federalist	Jacob Read (Charleston)	2
3	Charles Pinckney (Snee Farm)	Democratic- Republican	Dec 6, 1798 – Jun 6, 1801	Elected to finish Butler's term.	2	5th	2	Elected in 1794 or 1795. Lost re-election.	Mar 4, 1795 – Mar 3, 1801	Federalist	Jacob Read (Charleston)	2
3	Charles Pinckney (Snee Farm)	Democratic- Republican	Dec 6, 1798 – Jun 6, 1801	Re-elected in 1799. Resigned to become U.S. Minister to Spain.	3	6th	2	Elected in 1794 or 1795. Lost re-election.	Mar 4, 1795 – Mar 3, 1801	Federalist	Jacob Read (Charleston)	2
3	Charles Pinckney (Snee Farm)	Democratic- Republican	Dec 6, 1798 – Jun 6, 1801	Re-elected in 1799. Resigned to become U.S. Minister to Spain.	3	7th	3	Elected in 1800. Died.	Mar 4, 1801 – Oct 26, 1802	Democratic- Republican	John E. Colhoun (Charleston)	3
Vacant			Jun 6, 1801 – Dec 15, 1801		3	7th	3	Elected in 1800. Died.	Mar 4, 1801 – Oct 26, 1802	Democratic- Republican	John E. Colhoun (Charleston)	3
4	Thomas Sumter (Stateburg)	Democratic- Republican	Dec 15, 1801 – Dec 16, 1810	Elected in 1801 to finish Pinckney's term.	3	7th	3	Elected in 1800. Died.	Mar 4, 1801 – Oct 26, 1802	Democratic- Republican	John E. Colhoun (Charleston)	3
4	Thomas Sumter (Stateburg)	Democratic- Republican	Dec 15, 1801 – Dec 16, 1810	Elected in 1801 to finish Pinckney's term.	3	7th	3		Oct 26, 1802 – Nov 4, 1802	Vacant		
4	Thomas Sumter (Stateburg)	Democratic- Republican	Dec 15, 1801 – Dec 16, 1810	Elected in 1801 to finish Pinckney's term.	3	7th	3	Elected to finish Colhoun's term. Resigned.	Nov 4, 1802 – Nov 21, 1804	Democratic- Republican	Pierce Butler (Charleston)	4
4	Thomas Sumter (Stateburg)	Democratic- Republican	Dec 15, 1801 – Dec 16, 1810	Elected in 1801 to finish Pinckney's term.	3	8th	3	Elected to finish Colhoun's term. Resigned.	Nov 4, 1802 – Nov 21, 1804	Democratic- Republican	Pierce Butler (Charleston)	4
4	Thomas Sumter (Stateburg)	Democratic- Republican	Dec 15, 1801 – Dec 16, 1810	Elected in 1801 to finish Pinckney's term.	3	8th	3		Nov 21, 1804 – Dec 6, 1804	Vacant		
4	Thomas Sumter (Stateburg)	Democratic- Republican	Dec 15, 1801 – Dec 16, 1810	Elected in 1801 to finish Pinckney's term.	3	8th	3	Elected to finish Colhoun's term.	Dec 6, 1804 – Feb 26, 1826	Democratic- Republican	John Gaillard (Pendleton)	5
4	Thomas Sumter (Stateburg)	Democratic- Republican	Dec 15, 1801 – Dec 16, 1810	Re-elected in 1804. Resigned.	4	9th	3	Elected to finish Colhoun's term.	Dec 6, 1804 – Feb 26, 1826	Democratic- Republican	John Gaillard (Pendleton)	5
4	Thomas Sumter (Stateburg)	Democratic- Republican	Dec 15, 1801 – Dec 16, 1810	Re-elected in 1804. Resigned.	4	10th	4	Re-elected in 1806.	Dec 6, 1804 – Feb 26, 1826	Democratic- Republican	John Gaillard (Pendleton)	5
4	Thomas Sumter (Stateburg)	Democratic- Republican	Dec 15, 1801 – Dec 16, 1810	Re-elected in 1804. Resigned.	4	11th	4	Re-elected in 1806.	Dec 6, 1804 – Feb 26, 1826	Democratic- Republican	John Gaillard (Pendleton)	5
Vacant			Dec 16, 1810 – Dec 31, 1810		4	11th	4	Re-elected in 1806.	Dec 6, 1804 – Feb 26, 1826	Democratic- Republican	John Gaillard (Pendleton)	5
5	John Taylor (Columbia)	Democratic- Republican	Dec 31, 1810 – Nov 1816	Elected to finish Sumter's term.	4	11th	4	Re-elected in 1806.	Dec 6, 1804 – Feb 26, 1826	Democratic- Republican	John Gaillard (Pendleton)	5
5	John Taylor (Columbia)	Democratic- Republican	Dec 31, 1810 – Nov 1816	Re-elected in 1810. Resigned.	5	12th	4	Re-elected in 1806.	Dec 6, 1804 – Feb 26, 1826	Democratic- Republican	John Gaillard (Pendleton)	5
5	John Taylor (Columbia)	Democratic- Republican	Dec 31, 1810 – Nov 1816	Re-elected in 1810. Resigned.	5	13th	5	Re-elected in 1812.	Dec 6, 1804 – Feb 26, 1826	Democratic- Republican	John Gaillard (Pendleton)	5
5	John Taylor (Columbia)	Democratic- Republican	Dec 31, 1810 – Nov 1816	Re-elected in 1810. Resigned.	5	14th	5	Re-elected in 1812.	Dec 6, 1804 – Feb 26, 1826	Democratic- Republican	John Gaillard (Pendleton)	5
Vacant			Nov 1816 – Dec 4, 1816		5	14th	5	Re-elected in 1812.	Dec 6, 1804 – Feb 26, 1826	Democratic- Republican	John Gaillard (Pendleton)	5
6	William Smith (Pinckneyville)	Democratic- Republican	Dec 4, 1816 – Mar 3, 1823	Elected to finish Taylor's term.	5	14th	5	Re-elected in 1812.	Dec 6, 1804 – Feb 26, 1826	Democratic- Republican	John Gaillard (Pendleton)	5
6	William Smith (Pinckneyville)	Democratic- Republican	Dec 4, 1816 – Mar 3, 1823	Re-elected in 1816. Lost re-election.	6	15th	5	Re-elected in 1812.	Dec 6, 1804 – Feb 26, 1826	Democratic- Republican	John Gaillard (Pendleton)	5
6	William Smith (Pinckneyville)	Democratic- Republican	Dec 4, 1816 – Mar 3, 1823	Re-elected in 1816. Lost re-election.	6	16th	6	Re-elected in 1818.	Dec 6, 1804 – Feb 26, 1826	Democratic- Republican	John Gaillard (Pendleton)	5
6	William Smith (Pinckneyville)	Democratic- Republican	Dec 4, 1816 – Mar 3, 1823	Re-elected in 1816. Lost re-election.	6	17th	6	Re-elected in 1818.	Dec 6, 1804 – Feb 26, 1826	Democratic- Republican	John Gaillard (Pendleton)	5
7	Robert Y. Hayne (Charleston)	Democratic- Republican	Mar 4, 1823 – Dec 13, 1832	Elected in 1822.	7	18th	6	Re-elected in 1818.	Dec 6, 1804 – Feb 26, 1826	Democratic- Republican	John Gaillard (Pendleton)	5
7	Robert Y. Hayne (Charleston)	Jacksonian	Mar 4, 1823 – Dec 13, 1832	Elected in 1822.	7	19th	7	Re-elected in 1824. Died.	Dec 6, 1804 – Feb 26, 1826	Jacksonian	John Gaillard (Pendleton)	5
7	Robert Y. Hayne (Charleston)	Jacksonian	Mar 4, 1823 – Dec 13, 1832	Elected in 1822.	7	19th	7		Feb 26, 1826 – Mar 8, 1826	Vacant		
7	Robert Y. Hayne (Charleston)	Jacksonian	Mar 4, 1823 – Dec 13, 1832	Elected in 1822.	7	19th	7	Appointed to continue Gaillard's term.	Mar 8, 1826 – Nov 29, 1826	Jacksonian	William Harper (Charleston)	6
7	Robert Y. Hayne (Charleston)	Jacksonian	Mar 4, 1823 – Dec 13, 1832	Elected in 1822.	7	19th	7	Elected to finish Gaillard's term. Lost re-election.	Nov 29, 1826 – Mar 3, 1831	Jacksonian	William Smith (Charleston)	7
7	Robert Y. Hayne (Charleston)	Jacksonian	Mar 4, 1823 – Dec 13, 1832	Elected in 1822.	7	20th	7	Elected to finish Gaillard's term. Lost re-election.	Nov 29, 1826 – Mar 3, 1831	Jacksonian	William Smith (Charleston)	7
7	Robert Y. Hayne (Charleston)	Jacksonian	Mar 4, 1823 – Dec 13, 1832	Re-elected in 1828. Resigned to become South Carolina Governor.	8	21st	7	Elected to finish Gaillard's term. Lost re-election.	Nov 29, 1826 – Mar 3, 1831	Jacksonian	William Smith (Charleston)	7
7	Robert Y. Hayne (Charleston)	Nullifier	Mar 4, 1823 – Dec 13, 1832	Re-elected in 1828. Resigned to become South Carolina Governor.	8	22nd	8	Elected in 1830. Resigned due to ill health.	Mar 4, 1831 – Mar 3, 1833	Nullifier	Stephen Decatur Miller (Camden)	8
Vacant			Dec 13, 1832 – Dec 29, 1832		8	22nd	8	Elected in 1830. Resigned due to ill health.	Mar 4, 1831 – Mar 3, 1833	Nullifier	Stephen Decatur Miller (Camden)	8
8	John C. Calhoun (Fort Hill)	Nullifier	Dec 29, 1832 – Mar 3, 1843	Elected to finish Hayne's term.	8	22nd	8	Elected in 1830. Resigned due to ill health.	Mar 4, 1831 – Mar 3, 1833	Nullifier	Stephen Decatur Miller (Camden)	8
8	John C. Calhoun (Fort Hill)	Nullifier	Dec 29, 1832 – Mar 3, 1843	Elected to finish Hayne's term.	8	23rd	8		Mar 3, 1833 – Nov 26, 1833	Vacant		
8	John C. Calhoun (Fort Hill)	Nullifier	Dec 29, 1832 – Mar 3, 1843	Elected to finish Hayne's term.	8	23rd	8	Elected to finish Miller's term.	Nov 26, 1833 – Nov 29, 1842	Nullifier	William C. Preston (Columbia)	9
8	John C. Calhoun (Fort Hill)	Nullifier	Dec 29, 1832 – Mar 3, 1843	Re-elected in 1834.	9	24th	8	Elected to finish Miller's term.	Nov 26, 1833 – Nov 29, 1842	Nullifier	William C. Preston (Columbia)	9
8	John C. Calhoun (Fort Hill)	Democratic	Dec 29, 1832 – Mar 3, 1843	Re-elected in 1834.	9	25th	9	Re-elected in 1837. Resigned.	Nov 26, 1833 – Nov 29, 1842	Whig	William C. Preston (Columbia)	9
8	John C. Calhoun (Fort Hill)	Democratic	Dec 29, 1832 – Mar 3, 1843	Re-elected in 1834.	9	26th	9	Re-elected in 1837. Resigned.	Nov 26, 1833 – Nov 29, 1842	Whig	William C. Preston (Columbia)	9
8	John C. Calhoun (Fort Hill)	Democratic	Dec 29, 1832 – Mar 3, 1843	Re-elected in 1840. Resigned.	10	27th	9	Re-elected in 1837. Resigned.	Nov 26, 1833 – Nov 29, 1842	Whig	William C. Preston (Columbia)	9
8	John C. Calhoun (Fort Hill)	Democratic	Dec 29, 1832 – Mar 3, 1843	Re-elected in 1840. Resigned.	10	27th	9		Nov 29, 1842 – Dec 23, 1842	Vacant		
8	John C. Calhoun (Fort Hill)	Democratic	Dec 29, 1832 – Mar 3, 1843	Re-elected in 1840. Resigned.	10	27th	9	Elected to finish Preston's term.	Dec 23, 1842 – Aug 17, 1846	Democratic	George McDuffie (Cherry Hill)	10
9	Daniel Elliott Huger (Charleston)	Democratic	Mar 4, 1843 – Mar 3, 1845	Elected to finish Calhoun's term. Resigned.	10	28th	10	Re-elected in 1842 or 1843.	Dec 23, 1842 – Aug 17, 1846	Democratic	George McDuffie (Cherry Hill)	10
Vacant			Mar 3, 1845 – Nov 26, 1845		10	29th	10	Re-elected in 1842 or 1843.	Dec 23, 1842 – Aug 17, 1846	Democratic	George McDuffie (Cherry Hill)	10
10	John C. Calhoun (Pendleton)	Democratic	Nov 26, 1845 – Mar 31, 1850	Re-elected to finish his own term.	10	29th	10	Re-elected in 1842 or 1843.	Dec 23, 1842 – Aug 17, 1846	Democratic	George McDuffie (Cherry Hill)	10
10	John C. Calhoun (Pendleton)	Democratic	Nov 26, 1845 – Mar 31, 1850	Re-elected to finish his own term.	10	29th	10		Aug 17, 1846 – Dec 4, 1846	Vacant		
10	John C. Calhoun (Pendleton)	Democratic	Nov 26, 1845 – Mar 31, 1850	Re-elected to finish his own term.	10	29th	10	Appointed to continue McDuffie's term. Elected to finish McDuffie's term.	Dec 4, 1846 – May 25, 1857	Democratic	Andrew Butler (Edgefield)	11
10	John C. Calhoun (Pendleton)	Democratic	Nov 26, 1845 – Mar 31, 1850	Re-elected in 1846. Died.	11	30th	10	Appointed to continue McDuffie's term. Elected to finish McDuffie's term.	Dec 4, 1846 – May 25, 1857	Democratic	Andrew Butler (Edgefield)	11
10	John C. Calhoun (Pendleton)	Democratic	Nov 26, 1845 – Mar 31, 1850	Re-elected in 1846. Died.	11	31st	11	Re-elected in 1848.	Dec 4, 1846 – May 25, 1857	Democratic	Andrew Butler (Edgefield)	11
Vacant			Mar 31, 1850 – Apr 11, 1850		11	31st	11	Re-elected in 1848.	Dec 4, 1846 – May 25, 1857	Democratic	Andrew Butler (Edgefield)	11
11	Franklin H. Elmore (Columbia)	Democratic	Apr 11, 1850 – May 29, 1850	Appointed to continue Calhoun's term. Died.	11	31st	11	Re-elected in 1848.	Dec 4, 1846 – May 25, 1857	Democratic	Andrew Butler (Edgefield)	11
Vacant			May 29, 1850 – Jun 4, 1850		11	31st	11	Re-elected in 1848.	Dec 4, 1846 – May 25, 1857	Democratic	Andrew Butler (Edgefield)	11
12	Robert W. Barnwell (Beaufort)	Democratic	Jun 4, 1850 – Dec 8, 1850	Appointed to continue Calhoun's term. Retired when his successor was elected.	11	31st	11	Re-elected in 1848.	Dec 4, 1846 – May 25, 1857	Democratic	Andrew Butler (Edgefield)	11
Vacant			Dec 8, 1850 – Dec 18, 1850		11	31st	11	Re-elected in 1848.	Dec 4, 1846 – May 25, 1857	Democratic	Andrew Butler (Edgefield)	11
13	Robert Rhett (Charleston)	Democratic	Dec 18, 1850 – May 7, 1852	Elected to finish Calhoun's term. Resigned.	11	31st	11	Re-elected in 1848.	Dec 4, 1846 – May 25, 1857	Democratic	Andrew Butler (Edgefield)	11
13	Robert Rhett (Charleston)	Democratic	Dec 18, 1850 – May 7, 1852	Elected to finish Calhoun's term. Resigned.	11	32nd	11	Re-elected in 1848.	Dec 4, 1846 – May 25, 1857	Democratic	Andrew Butler (Edgefield)	11
Vacant			May 7, 1852 – May 10, 1852		11	32nd	11	Re-elected in 1848.	Dec 4, 1846 – May 25, 1857	Democratic	Andrew Butler (Edgefield)	11
14	William F. De Saussure (Columbia)	Democratic	May 10, 1852 – Mar 3, 1853	Appointed to continue Calhoun's term. Elected Nov 29, 1852 to finish Calhoun's term.	11	32nd	11	Re-elected in 1848.	Dec 4, 1846 – May 25, 1857	Democratic	Andrew Butler (Edgefield)	11
15	Josiah Evans (Society Hill)	Democratic	Mar 4, 1853 – May 6, 1858	Elected in 1852 or 1853. Died.	12	33rd	11	Re-elected in 1848.	Dec 4, 1846 – May 25, 1857	Democratic	Andrew Butler (Edgefield)	11
15	Josiah Evans (Society Hill)	Democratic	Mar 4, 1853 – May 6, 1858	Elected in 1852 or 1853. Died.	12	34th	12	Re-elected in 1854. Died.	Dec 4, 1846 – May 25, 1857	Democratic	Andrew Butler (Edgefield)	11
15	Josiah Evans (Society Hill)	Democratic	Mar 4, 1853 – May 6, 1858	Elected in 1852 or 1853. Died.	12	35th	12	Re-elected in 1854. Died.	Dec 4, 1846 – May 25, 1857	Democratic	Andrew Butler (Edgefield)	11
15	Josiah Evans (Society Hill)	Democratic	Mar 4, 1853 – May 6, 1858	Elected in 1852 or 1853. Died.	12	35th	12		May 25, 1857 – Dec 7, 1857	Vacant		
15	Josiah Evans (Society Hill)	Democratic	Mar 4, 1853 – May 6, 1858	Elected in 1852 or 1853. Died.	12	35th	12	Elected to finish Butler's term. Withdrew.	Dec 7, 1857 – Nov 11, 1860	Democratic	James H. Hammond (Beech Island)	12
Vacant			May 6, 1858 – May 11, 1858		12	35th	12	Elected to finish Butler's term. Withdrew.	Dec 7, 1857 – Nov 11, 1860	Democratic	James H. Hammond (Beech Island)	12
16	Arthur P. Hayne (Charleston)	Democratic	May 11, 1858 – Dec 2, 1858	Appointed to continue Evans' term. Retired when his successor was elected.	12	35th	12	Elected to finish Butler's term. Withdrew.	Dec 7, 1857 – Nov 11, 1860	Democratic	James H. Hammond (Beech Island)	12
17	James Chesnut Jr. (Camden)	Democratic	Dec 3, 1858 – Nov 10, 1860	Elected to finish Evans' term.	12	35th	12	Elected to finish Butler's term. Withdrew.	Dec 7, 1857 – Nov 11, 1860	Democratic	James H. Hammond (Beech Island)	12
17	James Chesnut Jr. (Camden)	Democratic	Dec 3, 1858 – Nov 10, 1860	Re-elected in 1858. Withdrew and was later expelled for his support of the Confederacy.	13	36th	12	Elected to finish Butler's term. Withdrew.	Dec 7, 1857 – Nov 11, 1860	Democratic	James H. Hammond (Beech Island)	12
Vacant			Nov 10, 1860 – Jul 15, 1868	Civil War and Reconstruction.	13	36th	12	Elected to finish Butler's term. Withdrew.	Dec 7, 1857 – Nov 11, 1860	Democratic	James H. Hammond (Beech Island)	12
Vacant			Nov 10, 1860 – Jul 15, 1868	Civil War and Reconstruction.	13	36th	12	Civil War and Reconstruction.	Nov 11, 1860 – Jul 16, 1868	Vacant		
Vacant			Nov 10, 1860 – Jul 15, 1868	Civil War and Reconstruction.	13	37th	13	Civil War and Reconstruction.	Nov 11, 1860 – Jul 16, 1868	Vacant		
Vacant			Nov 10, 1860 – Jul 15, 1868	Civil War and Reconstruction.	13	38th	13	Civil War and Reconstruction.	Nov 11, 1860 – Jul 16, 1868	Vacant		
Vacant			Nov 10, 1860 – Jul 15, 1868	Civil War and Reconstruction.	14	39th	13	Civil War and Reconstruction.	Nov 11, 1860 – Jul 16, 1868	Vacant		
Vacant			Nov 10, 1860 – Jul 15, 1868	Civil War and Reconstruction.	14	40th	14	Civil War and Reconstruction.	Nov 11, 1860 – Jul 16, 1868	Vacant		
18	Thomas J. Robertson (Columbia)	Republican	Jul 15, 1868 – Mar 3, 1877	Elected to finish the vacant term.	14	40th	14	Civil War and Reconstruction.	Nov 11, 1860 – Jul 16, 1868	Vacant		
18	Thomas J. Robertson (Columbia)	Republican	Jul 15, 1868 – Mar 3, 1877	Elected to finish the vacant term.	14	40th	14	Elected to finish the vacant term.	Jul 16, 1868 – Mar 3, 1873	Republican	Frederick A. Sawyer (Charleston)	13
18	Thomas J. Robertson (Columbia)	Republican	Jul 15, 1868 – Mar 3, 1877	Elected to finish the vacant term.	14	41st	14	Elected to finish the vacant term.	Jul 16, 1868 – Mar 3, 1873	Republican	Frederick A. Sawyer (Charleston)	13
18	Thomas J. Robertson (Columbia)	Republican	Jul 15, 1868 – Mar 3, 1877	Re-elected in 1870. Retired.	15	42nd	14	Elected to finish the vacant term.	Jul 16, 1868 – Mar 3, 1873	Republican	Frederick A. Sawyer (Charleston)	13
18	Thomas J. Robertson (Columbia)	Republican	Jul 15, 1868 – Mar 3, 1877	Re-elected in 1870. Retired.	15	43rd	15	Elected in 1872 or 1873.	Mar 4, 1873 – Mar 3, 1879	Republican	John J. Patterson (Charleston)	14
18	Thomas J. Robertson (Columbia)	Republican	Jul 15, 1868 – Mar 3, 1877	Re-elected in 1870. Retired.	15	44th	15	Elected in 1872 or 1873.	Mar 4, 1873 – Mar 3, 1879	Republican	John J. Patterson (Charleston)	14
19	Matthew Butler (Edgefield)	Democratic	Mar 4, 1877 – Mar 3, 1895	Elected in 1876.	16	45th	15	Elected in 1872 or 1873.	Mar 4, 1873 – Mar 3, 1879	Republican	John J. Patterson (Charleston)	14
19	Matthew Butler (Edgefield)	Democratic	Mar 4, 1877 – Mar 3, 1895	Elected in 1876.	16	46th	16	Elected in 1878.	Mar 4, 1879 – Mar 3, 1891	Democratic	Wade Hampton III (Charleston)	15
19	Matthew Butler (Edgefield)	Democratic	Mar 4, 1877 – Mar 3, 1895	Elected in 1876.	16	47th	16	Elected in 1878.	Mar 4, 1879 – Mar 3, 1891	Democratic	Wade Hampton III (Charleston)	15
19	Matthew Butler (Edgefield)	Democratic	Mar 4, 1877 – Mar 3, 1895	Re-elected in 1882.	17	48th	16	Elected in 1878.	Mar 4, 1879 – Mar 3, 1891	Democratic	Wade Hampton III (Charleston)	15
19	Matthew Butler (Edgefield)	Democratic	Mar 4, 1877 – Mar 3, 1895	Re-elected in 1882.	17	49th	17	Re-elected in 1884. Lost re-election.	Mar 4, 1879 – Mar 3, 1891	Democratic	Wade Hampton III (Charleston)	15
19	Matthew Butler (Edgefield)	Democratic	Mar 4, 1877 – Mar 3, 1895	Re-elected in 1882.	17	50th	17	Re-elected in 1884. Lost re-election.	Mar 4, 1879 – Mar 3, 1891	Democratic	Wade Hampton III (Charleston)	15
19	Matthew Butler (Edgefield)	Democratic	Mar 4, 1877 – Mar 3, 1895	Re-elected in 1888. Lost renomination.	18	51st	17	Re-elected in 1884. Lost re-election.	Mar 4, 1879 – Mar 3, 1891	Democratic	Wade Hampton III (Charleston)	15
19	Matthew Butler (Edgefield)	Democratic	Mar 4, 1877 – Mar 3, 1895	Re-elected in 1888. Lost renomination.	18	52nd	18	Elected in 1890. Retired.	Mar 4, 1891 – Mar 3, 1897	Democratic	John L. M. Irby (Laurens)	16
19	Matthew Butler (Edgefield)	Democratic	Mar 4, 1877 – Mar 3, 1895	Re-elected in 1888. Lost renomination.	18	53rd	18	Elected in 1890. Retired.	Mar 4, 1891 – Mar 3, 1897	Democratic	John L. M. Irby (Laurens)	16
20	Benjamin Tillman (Trenton)	Democratic	Mar 4, 1895 – Jul 3, 1918	Elected in 1894.	19	54th	18	Elected in 1890. Retired.	Mar 4, 1891 – Mar 3, 1897	Democratic	John L. M. Irby (Laurens)	16
20	Benjamin Tillman (Trenton)	Democratic	Mar 4, 1895 – Jul 3, 1918	Elected in 1894.	19	55th	19	Elected in 1897. Died.	Mar 4, 1897 – May 20, 1897	Democratic	Joseph Earle (Greenville)	17
20	Benjamin Tillman (Trenton)	Democratic	Mar 4, 1895 – Jul 3, 1918	Elected in 1894.	19	55th	19		May 20, 1897 – May 27, 1897	Vacant		
20	Benjamin Tillman (Trenton)	Democratic	Mar 4, 1895 – Jul 3, 1918	Elected in 1894.	19	55th	19	Appointed to continue Earle's term. Elected in 1898 to finish Earle's term. Retired.	May 27, 1897 – Mar 3, 1903	Democratic	John McLaurin (Bennettsville)	18
20	Benjamin Tillman (Trenton)	Democratic	Mar 4, 1895 – Jul 3, 1918	Elected in 1894.	19	56th	19	Appointed to continue Earle's term. Elected in 1898 to finish Earle's term. Retired.	May 27, 1897 – Mar 3, 1903	Democratic	John McLaurin (Bennettsville)	18
20	Benjamin Tillman (Trenton)	Democratic	Mar 4, 1895 – Jul 3, 1918	Re-elected in 1901.	20	57th	19	Appointed to continue Earle's term. Elected in 1898 to finish Earle's term. Retired.	May 27, 1897 – Mar 3, 1903	Democratic	John McLaurin (Bennettsville)	18
20	Benjamin Tillman (Trenton)	Democratic	Mar 4, 1895 – Jul 3, 1918	Re-elected in 1901.	20	58th	20	Elected in 1903. Died.	Mar 4, 1903 – Feb 20, 1908	Democratic	Asbury Latimer (Belton)	19
20	Benjamin Tillman (Trenton)	Democratic	Mar 4, 1895 – Jul 3, 1918	Re-elected in 1901.	20	59th	20	Elected in 1903. Died.	Mar 4, 1903 – Feb 20, 1908	Democratic	Asbury Latimer (Belton)	19
20	Benjamin Tillman (Trenton)	Democratic	Mar 4, 1895 – Jul 3, 1918	Re-elected in 1907.	21	60th	20	Elected in 1903. Died.	Mar 4, 1903 – Feb 20, 1908	Democratic	Asbury Latimer (Belton)	19
20	Benjamin Tillman (Trenton)	Democratic	Mar 4, 1895 – Jul 3, 1918	Re-elected in 1907.	21	60th	20		Feb 20, 1908 – Mar 6, 1908	Vacant		
20	Benjamin Tillman (Trenton)	Democratic	Mar 4, 1895 – Jul 3, 1918	Re-elected in 1907.	21	60th	20	Elected in 1908 to finish Latimer's term. Retired.	Mar 6, 1908 – Mar 3, 1909	Democratic	Frank B. Gary (Abbeville)	20
20	Benjamin Tillman (Trenton)	Democratic	Mar 4, 1895 – Jul 3, 1918	Re-elected in 1907.	21	61st	21	Elected in 1909.	Mar 4, 1909 – Nov 17, 1944	Democratic	Ellison D. Smith (Lynchburg)	21
20	Benjamin Tillman (Trenton)	Democratic	Mar 4, 1895 – Jul 3, 1918	Re-elected in 1907.	21	62nd	21	Elected in 1909.	Mar 4, 1909 – Nov 17, 1944	Democratic	Ellison D. Smith (Lynchburg)	21
20	Benjamin Tillman (Trenton)	Democratic	Mar 4, 1895 – Jul 3, 1918	Re-elected in 1913. Died.	22	63rd	21	Elected in 1909.	Mar 4, 1909 – Nov 17, 1944	Democratic	Ellison D. Smith (Lynchburg)	21
20	Benjamin Tillman (Trenton)	Democratic	Mar 4, 1895 – Jul 3, 1918	Re-elected in 1913. Died.	22	64th	22	Re-elected in 1914.	Mar 4, 1909 – Nov 17, 1944	Democratic	Ellison D. Smith (Lynchburg)	21
20	Benjamin Tillman (Trenton)	Democratic	Mar 4, 1895 – Jul 3, 1918	Re-elected in 1913. Died.	22	65th	22	Re-elected in 1914.	Mar 4, 1909 – Nov 17, 1944	Democratic	Ellison D. Smith (Lynchburg)	21
Vacant			Jul 3, 1918 – Jul 6, 1918		22	65th	22	Re-elected in 1914.	Mar 4, 1909 – Nov 17, 1944	Democratic	Ellison D. Smith (Lynchburg)	21
21	Christie Benet (Columbia)	Democratic	Jul 6, 1918 – Nov 5, 1918	Appointed to continue Tillman's term. Lost election to finish Tillman's term.	22	65th	22	Re-elected in 1914.	Mar 4, 1909 – Nov 17, 1944	Democratic	Ellison D. Smith (Lynchburg)	21
22	William P. Pollock (Cheraw)	Democratic	Nov 6, 1918 – Mar 3, 1919	Elected to finish Tillman's term. Retired.	22	65th	22	Re-elected in 1914.	Mar 4, 1909 – Nov 17, 1944	Democratic	Ellison D. Smith (Lynchburg)	21
23	Nathaniel Dial (Laurens)	Democratic	Mar 4, 1919 – Mar 3, 1925	Elected in 1918. Lost renomination.	23	66th	22	Re-elected in 1914.	Mar 4, 1909 – Nov 17, 1944	Democratic	Ellison D. Smith (Lynchburg)	21
23	Nathaniel Dial (Laurens)	Democratic	Mar 4, 1919 – Mar 3, 1925	Elected in 1918. Lost renomination.	23	67th	23	Re-elected in 1920.	Mar 4, 1909 – Nov 17, 1944	Democratic	Ellison D. Smith (Lynchburg)	21
23	Nathaniel Dial (Laurens)	Democratic	Mar 4, 1919 – Mar 3, 1925	Elected in 1918. Lost renomination.	23	68th	23	Re-elected in 1920.	Mar 4, 1909 – Nov 17, 1944	Democratic	Ellison D. Smith (Lynchburg)	21
24	Cole L. Blease (Columbia)	Democratic	Mar 4, 1925 – Mar 3, 1931	Elected in 1924. Lost renomination.	24	69th	23	Re-elected in 1920.	Mar 4, 1909 – Nov 17, 1944	Democratic	Ellison D. Smith (Lynchburg)	21
24	Cole L. Blease (Columbia)	Democratic	Mar 4, 1925 – Mar 3, 1931	Elected in 1924. Lost renomination.	24	70th	24	Re-elected in 1926.	Mar 4, 1909 – Nov 17, 1944	Democratic	Ellison D. Smith (Lynchburg)	21
24	Cole L. Blease (Columbia)	Democratic	Mar 4, 1925 – Mar 3, 1931	Elected in 1924. Lost renomination.	24	71st	24	Re-elected in 1926.	Mar 4, 1909 – Nov 17, 1944	Democratic	Ellison D. Smith (Lynchburg)	21
25	James F. Byrnes (Spartanburg)	Democratic	Mar 4, 1931 – Jul 8, 1941	Elected in 1930.	25	72nd	24	Re-elected in 1926.	Mar 4, 1909 – Nov 17, 1944	Democratic	Ellison D. Smith (Lynchburg)	21
25	James F. Byrnes (Spartanburg)	Democratic	Mar 4, 1931 – Jul 8, 1941	Elected in 1930.	25	73rd	25	Re-elected in 1932.	Mar 4, 1909 – Nov 17, 1944	Democratic	Ellison D. Smith (Lynchburg)	21
25	James F. Byrnes (Spartanburg)	Democratic	Mar 4, 1931 – Jul 8, 1941	Elected in 1930.	25	74th	25	Re-elected in 1932.	Mar 4, 1909 – Nov 17, 1944	Democratic	Ellison D. Smith (Lynchburg)	21
25	James F. Byrnes (Spartanburg)	Democratic	Mar 4, 1931 – Jul 8, 1941	Re-elected in 1936. Resigned to become a Justice of the U.S. Supreme Court.	26	75th	25	Re-elected in 1932.	Mar 4, 1909 – Nov 17, 1944	Democratic	Ellison D. Smith (Lynchburg)	21
25	James F. Byrnes (Spartanburg)	Democratic	Mar 4, 1931 – Jul 8, 1941	Re-elected in 1936. Resigned to become a Justice of the U.S. Supreme Court.	26	76th	26	Re-elected in 1938. Lost renomination before dying.	Mar 4, 1909 – Nov 17, 1944	Democratic	Ellison D. Smith (Lynchburg)	21
25	James F. Byrnes (Spartanburg)	Democratic	Mar 4, 1931 – Jul 8, 1941	Re-elected in 1936. Resigned to become a Justice of the U.S. Supreme Court.	26	77th	26	Re-elected in 1938. Lost renomination before dying.	Mar 4, 1909 – Nov 17, 1944	Democratic	Ellison D. Smith (Lynchburg)	21
Vacant			Jul 8, 1941 – Jul 22, 1941		26	77th	26	Re-elected in 1938. Lost renomination before dying.	Mar 4, 1909 – Nov 17, 1944	Democratic	Ellison D. Smith (Lynchburg)	21
26	Alva Lumpkin (Columbia)	Democratic	Jul 22, 1941 – Aug 1, 1941	Appointed to continue Byrnes's term. Died.	26	77th	26	Re-elected in 1938. Lost renomination before dying.	Mar 4, 1909 – Nov 17, 1944	Democratic	Ellison D. Smith (Lynchburg)	21
27	Roger Peace (Greenville)	Democratic	Aug 5, 1941 – Nov 4, 1941	Appointed to continue Byrnes's term. Retired when successor elected.	26	77th	26	Re-elected in 1938. Lost renomination before dying.	Mar 4, 1909 – Nov 17, 1944	Democratic	Ellison D. Smith (Lynchburg)	21
28	Burnet R. Maybank (Charleston)	Democratic	Nov 5, 1941 – Sep 1, 1954	Elected to finish Byrnes's term.	26	77th	26	Re-elected in 1938. Lost renomination before dying.	Mar 4, 1909 – Nov 17, 1944	Democratic	Ellison D. Smith (Lynchburg)	21
28	Burnet R. Maybank (Charleston)	Democratic	Nov 5, 1941 – Sep 1, 1954	Re-elected in 1942.	27	78th	26	Re-elected in 1938. Lost renomination before dying.	Mar 4, 1909 – Nov 17, 1944	Democratic	Ellison D. Smith (Lynchburg)	21
28	Burnet R. Maybank (Charleston)	Democratic	Nov 5, 1941 – Sep 1, 1954	Re-elected in 1942.	27	78th	26		Nov 17, 1944 – Nov 20, 1944	Vacant		
28	Burnet R. Maybank (Charleston)	Democratic	Nov 5, 1941 – Sep 1, 1954	Re-elected in 1942.	27	78th	26	Appointed to finish Smith's term. Retired when successor was elected to the next full term.	Nov 20, 1944 – Jan 3, 1945	Democratic	Wilton E. Hall (Anderson)	22
28	Burnet R. Maybank (Charleston)	Democratic	Nov 5, 1941 – Sep 1, 1954	Re-elected in 1942.	27	79th	27	Elected in 1944.	Jan 3, 1945 – Apr 18, 1965	Democratic	Olin D. Johnston (Spartanburg)	23
28	Burnet R. Maybank (Charleston)	Democratic	Nov 5, 1941 – Sep 1, 1954	Re-elected in 1942.	27	80th	27	Elected in 1944.	Jan 3, 1945 – Apr 18, 1965	Democratic	Olin D. Johnston (Spartanburg)	23
28	Burnet R. Maybank (Charleston)	Democratic	Nov 5, 1941 – Sep 1, 1954	Re-elected in 1948. Died.	28	81st	27	Elected in 1944.	Jan 3, 1945 – Apr 18, 1965	Democratic	Olin D. Johnston (Spartanburg)	23
28	Burnet R. Maybank (Charleston)	Democratic	Nov 5, 1941 – Sep 1, 1954	Re-elected in 1948. Died.	28	82nd	28	Re-elected in 1950.	Jan 3, 1945 – Apr 18, 1965	Democratic	Olin D. Johnston (Spartanburg)	23
28	Burnet R. Maybank (Charleston)	Democratic	Nov 5, 1941 – Sep 1, 1954	Re-elected in 1948. Died.	28	83rd	28	Re-elected in 1950.	Jan 3, 1945 – Apr 18, 1965	Democratic	Olin D. Johnston (Spartanburg)	23
Vacant			Sep 1, 1954 – Sep 6, 1954		28	83rd	28	Re-elected in 1950.	Jan 3, 1945 – Apr 18, 1965	Democratic	Olin D. Johnston (Spartanburg)	23
29	Charles E. Daniel (Greenville)	Democratic	Sep 6, 1954 – Dec 23, 1954	Appointed to finish Maybank's term. Resigned early to give successor preferential seniority.	28	83rd	28	Re-elected in 1950.	Jan 3, 1945 – Apr 18, 1965	Democratic	Olin D. Johnston (Spartanburg)	23
30	Strom Thurmond (Aiken)	Democratic	Dec 24, 1954 – Apr 4, 1956	Appointed to finish Maybank's term, having been elected to the next term.	28	83rd	28	Re-elected in 1950.	Jan 3, 1945 – Apr 18, 1965	Democratic	Olin D. Johnston (Spartanburg)	23
30	Strom Thurmond (Aiken)	Democratic	Dec 24, 1954 – Apr 4, 1956	Elected in 1954. Resigned.	29	84th	28	Re-elected in 1950.	Jan 3, 1945 – Apr 18, 1965	Democratic	Olin D. Johnston (Spartanburg)	23
31	Thomas A. Wofford (Greenville)	Democratic	Apr 5, 1956 – Nov 6, 1956	Appointed to continue Thurmond's term. Retired.	29	84th	28	Re-elected in 1950.	Jan 3, 1945 – Apr 18, 1965	Democratic	Olin D. Johnston (Spartanburg)	23
32	Strom Thurmond (Aiken)	Democratic	Nov 7, 1956 – Jan 3, 2003	Elected in 1956 to finish his own term.	29	84th	28	Re-elected in 1950.	Jan 3, 1945 – Apr 18, 1965	Democratic	Olin D. Johnston (Spartanburg)	23
32	Strom Thurmond (Aiken)	Democratic	Nov 7, 1956 – Jan 3, 2003	Elected in 1956 to finish his own term.	29	85th	29	Re-elected in 1956.	Jan 3, 1945 – Apr 18, 1965	Democratic	Olin D. Johnston (Spartanburg)	23
32	Strom Thurmond (Aiken)	Democratic	Nov 7, 1956 – Jan 3, 2003	Elected in 1956 to finish his own term.	29	86th	29	Re-elected in 1956.	Jan 3, 1945 – Apr 18, 1965	Democratic	Olin D. Johnston (Spartanburg)	23
32	Strom Thurmond (Aiken)	Democratic	Nov 7, 1956 – Jan 3, 2003	Re-elected in 1960. Changed party on Sep 16, 1964.	30	87th	29	Re-elected in 1956.	Jan 3, 1945 – Apr 18, 1965	Democratic	Olin D. Johnston (Spartanburg)	23
32	Strom Thurmond (Aiken)	Democratic	Nov 7, 1956 – Jan 3, 2003	Re-elected in 1960. Changed party on Sep 16, 1964.	30	88th	30	Re-elected in 1962. Died.	Jan 3, 1945 – Apr 18, 1965	Democratic	Olin D. Johnston (Spartanburg)	23
32	Strom Thurmond (Aiken)	Republican	Nov 7, 1956 – Jan 3, 2003	Re-elected in 1960. Changed party on Sep 16, 1964.	30	88th	30	Re-elected in 1962. Died.	Jan 3, 1945 – Apr 18, 1965	Democratic	Olin D. Johnston (Spartanburg)	23
32	Strom Thurmond (Aiken)	Republican	Nov 7, 1956 – Jan 3, 2003	Re-elected in 1960. Changed party on Sep 16, 1964.	30	89th	30	Re-elected in 1962. Died.	Jan 3, 1945 – Apr 18, 1965	Democratic	Olin D. Johnston (Spartanburg)	23
32	Strom Thurmond (Aiken)	Republican	Nov 7, 1956 – Jan 3, 2003	Re-elected in 1960. Changed party on Sep 16, 1964.	30	89th	30		Apr 18, 1965 – Apr 22, 1965	Vacant		
32	Strom Thurmond (Aiken)	Republican	Nov 7, 1956 – Jan 3, 2003	Re-elected in 1960. Changed party on Sep 16, 1964.	30	89th	30	Appointed to continue Johnston's term. Lost nomination to finish Johnston's term.	Apr 22, 1965 – Nov 8, 1966	Democratic	Donald S. Russell (Spartanburg)	24
32	Strom Thurmond (Aiken)	Republican	Nov 7, 1956 – Jan 3, 2003	Re-elected in 1960. Changed party on Sep 16, 1964.	30	89th	30	Elected to finish Johnston's term.	Nov 9, 1966 – Jan 3, 2005	Democratic	Fritz Hollings (Charleston)	25
32	Strom Thurmond (Aiken)	Republican	Nov 7, 1956 – Jan 3, 2003	Re-elected in 1966.	31	90th	30	Elected to finish Johnston's term.	Nov 9, 1966 – Jan 3, 2005	Democratic	Fritz Hollings (Charleston)	25
32	Strom Thurmond (Aiken)	Republican	Nov 7, 1956 – Jan 3, 2003	Re-elected in 1966.	31	91st	31	Re-elected in 1968.	Nov 9, 1966 – Jan 3, 2005	Democratic	Fritz Hollings (Charleston)	25
32	Strom Thurmond (Aiken)	Republican	Nov 7, 1956 – Jan 3, 2003	Re-elected in 1966.	31	92nd	31	Re-elected in 1968.	Nov 9, 1966 – Jan 3, 2005	Democratic	Fritz Hollings (Charleston)	25
32	Strom Thurmond (Aiken)	Republican	Nov 7, 1956 – Jan 3, 2003	Re-elected in 1972.	32	93rd	31	Re-elected in 1968.	Nov 9, 1966 – Jan 3, 2005	Democratic	Fritz Hollings (Charleston)	25
32	Strom Thurmond (Aiken)	Republican	Nov 7, 1956 – Jan 3, 2003	Re-elected in 1972.	32	94th	32	Re-elected in 1974.	Nov 9, 1966 – Jan 3, 2005	Democratic	Fritz Hollings (Charleston)	25
32	Strom Thurmond (Aiken)	Republican	Nov 7, 1956 – Jan 3, 2003	Re-elected in 1972.	32	95th	32	Re-elected in 1974.	Nov 9, 1966 – Jan 3, 2005	Democratic	Fritz Hollings (Charleston)	25
32	Strom Thurmond (Aiken)	Republican	Nov 7, 1956 – Jan 3, 2003	Re-elected in 1978.	33	96th	32	Re-elected in 1974.	Nov 9, 1966 – Jan 3, 2005	Democratic	Fritz Hollings (Charleston)	25
32	Strom Thurmond (Aiken)	Republican	Nov 7, 1956 – Jan 3, 2003	Re-elected in 1978.	33	97th	33	Re-elected in 1980.	Nov 9, 1966 – Jan 3, 2005	Democratic	Fritz Hollings (Charleston)	25
32	Strom Thurmond (Aiken)	Republican	Nov 7, 1956 – Jan 3, 2003	Re-elected in 1978.	33	98th	33	Re-elected in 1980.	Nov 9, 1966 – Jan 3, 2005	Democratic	Fritz Hollings (Charleston)	25
32	Strom Thurmond (Aiken)	Republican	Nov 7, 1956 – Jan 3, 2003	Re-elected in 1984.	34	99th	33	Re-elected in 1980.	Nov 9, 1966 – Jan 3, 2005	Democratic	Fritz Hollings (Charleston)	25
32	Strom Thurmond (Aiken)	Republican	Nov 7, 1956 – Jan 3, 2003	Re-elected in 1984.	34	100th	34	Re-elected in 1986.	Nov 9, 1966 – Jan 3, 2005	Democratic	Fritz Hollings (Charleston)	25
32	Strom Thurmond (Aiken)	Republican	Nov 7, 1956 – Jan 3, 2003	Re-elected in 1984.	34	101st	34	Re-elected in 1986.	Nov 9, 1966 – Jan 3, 2005	Democratic	Fritz Hollings (Charleston)	25
32	Strom Thurmond (Aiken)	Republican	Nov 7, 1956 – Jan 3, 2003	Re-elected in 1990.	35	102nd	34	Re-elected in 1986.	Nov 9, 1966 – Jan 3, 2005	Democratic	Fritz Hollings (Charleston)	25
32	Strom Thurmond (Aiken)	Republican	Nov 7, 1956 – Jan 3, 2003	Re-elected in 1990.	35	103rd	35	Re-elected in 1992.	Nov 9, 1966 – Jan 3, 2005	Democratic	Fritz Hollings (Charleston)	25
32	Strom Thurmond (Aiken)	Republican	Nov 7, 1956 – Jan 3, 2003	Re-elected in 1990.	35	104th	35	Re-elected in 1992.	Nov 9, 1966 – Jan 3, 2005	Democratic	Fritz Hollings (Charleston)	25
32	Strom Thurmond (Aiken)	Republican	Nov 7, 1956 – Jan 3, 2003	Re-elected in 1996. Retired.	36	105th	35	Re-elected in 1992.	Nov 9, 1966 – Jan 3, 2005	Democratic	Fritz Hollings (Charleston)	25
32	Strom Thurmond (Aiken)	Republican	Nov 7, 1956 – Jan 3, 2003	Re-elected in 1996. Retired.	36	106th	36	Re-elected in 1998. Retired.	Nov 9, 1966 – Jan 3, 2005	Democratic	Fritz Hollings (Charleston)	25
32	Strom Thurmond (Aiken)	Republican	Nov 7, 1956 – Jan 3, 2003	Re-elected in 1996. Retired.	36	107th	36	Re-elected in 1998. Retired.	Nov 9, 1966 – Jan 3, 2005	Democratic	Fritz Hollings (Charleston)	25
33	Lindsey Graham (Seneca)	Republican	Jan 3, 2003 – Jul 11, 2026	Elected in 2002.	37	108th	36	Re-elected in 1998. Retired.	Nov 9, 1966 – Jan 3, 2005	Democratic	Fritz Hollings (Charleston)	25
33	Lindsey Graham (Seneca)	Republican	Jan 3, 2003 – Jul 11, 2026	Elected in 2002.	37	109th	37	Elected in 2004.	Jan 3, 2005 – Jan 2, 2013	Republican	Jim DeMint (Greenville)	26
33	Lindsey Graham (Seneca)	Republican	Jan 3, 2003 – Jul 11, 2026	Elected in 2002.	37	110th	37	Elected in 2004.	Jan 3, 2005 – Jan 2, 2013	Republican	Jim DeMint (Greenville)	26
33	Lindsey Graham (Seneca)	Republican	Jan 3, 2003 – Jul 11, 2026	Re-elected in 2008.	38	111th	37	Elected in 2004.	Jan 3, 2005 – Jan 2, 2013	Republican	Jim DeMint (Greenville)	26
33	Lindsey Graham (Seneca)	Republican	Jan 3, 2003 – Jul 11, 2026	Re-elected in 2008.	38	112th	38	Re-elected in 2010. Resigned to become President of The Heritage Foundation.	Jan 3, 2005 – Jan 2, 2013	Republican	Jim DeMint (Greenville)	26
33	Lindsey Graham (Seneca)	Republican	Jan 3, 2003 – Jul 11, 2026	Re-elected in 2008.	38	112th	38	Appointed to continue DeMint's term. Elected in 2014 to finish DeMint's term.	Jan 2, 2013 – present	Republican	Tim Scott (Hanahan)	27
33	Lindsey Graham (Seneca)	Republican	Jan 3, 2003 – Jul 11, 2026	Re-elected in 2008.	38	113th	38	Appointed to continue DeMint's term. Elected in 2014 to finish DeMint's term.	Jan 2, 2013 – present	Republican	Tim Scott (Hanahan)	27
33	Lindsey Graham (Seneca)	Republican	Jan 3, 2003 – Jul 11, 2026	Re-elected in 2014.	39	114th	38	Appointed to continue DeMint's term. Elected in 2014 to finish DeMint's term.	Jan 2, 2013 – present	Republican	Tim Scott (Hanahan)	27
33	Lindsey Graham (Seneca)	Republican	Jan 3, 2003 – Jul 11, 2026	Re-elected in 2014.	39	115th	39	Re-elected in 2016.	Jan 2, 2013 – present	Republican	Tim Scott (Hanahan)	27
33	Lindsey Graham (Seneca)	Republican	Jan 3, 2003 – Jul 11, 2026	Re-elected in 2014.	39	116th	39	Re-elected in 2016.	Jan 2, 2013 – present	Republican	Tim Scott (Hanahan)	27
33	Lindsey Graham (Seneca)	Republican	Jan 3, 2003 – Jul 11, 2026	Re-elected in 2020. Died. (Note: Graham died after winning the Republican nomination, but before the general election in November)	40	117th	39	Re-elected in 2016.	Jan 2, 2013 – present	Republican	Tim Scott (Hanahan)	27
33	Lindsey Graham (Seneca)	Republican	Jan 3, 2003 – Jul 11, 2026	Re-elected in 2020. Died.	40	118th	40	Re-elected in 2022.	Jan 2, 2013 – present	Republican	Tim Scott (Hanahan)	27
33	Lindsey Graham (Seneca)	Republican	Jan 3, 2003 – Jul 11, 2026	Re-elected in 2020. Died.	40	119th	40	Re-elected in 2022.	Jan 2, 2013 – present	Republican	Tim Scott (Hanahan)	27
Vacant			Jul 11, 2026 – Jul 13, 2026		40	119th	40	Re-elected in 2022.	Jan 2, 2013 – present	Republican	Tim Scott (Hanahan)	27
34	Darline Graham (Lexington)	Republican	Jul 13, 2026 – present	Appointed to finish her brother's term. Lost election to full term.	40	119th	40	Re-elected in 2022.	Jan 2, 2013 – present	Republican	Tim Scott (Hanahan)	27
35	Annie Andrews (elect) (Charleston)	Democratic	Taking office Jan 3, 2027	Elected in 2026.	41	120th	40	Re-elected in 2022.	Jan 2, 2013 – present	Republican	Tim Scott (Hanahan)	27
35	Annie Andrews (elect) (Charleston)	Democratic	Taking office Jan 3, 2027	Elected in 2026.	41	121st	41	To be determined in the 2028 election.				
35	Annie Andrews (elect) (Charleston)	Democratic	Taking office Jan 3, 2027	Elected in 2026.	41	122nd	41	To be determined in the 2028 election.				
To be determined in the 2032 election.					42	123rd	41	To be determined in the 2028 election.				

== See also ==
- Elections in South Carolina
- List of United States representatives from South Carolina
- South Carolina's congressional delegations

== Bibliography ==
- Byrd, Robert C. (October 1, 1993). Wolff, Wendy (ed.). The Senate, 1789-1989: Historical Statistics, 1789-1992. United States Senate Historical Office (volume 4 Bicentennial ed.). Washington, D.C.: U.S. Government Printing Office. ISBN 9780160632563.
