= Nathaniel B. Dial =

American politician and lawyer (1862–1940)

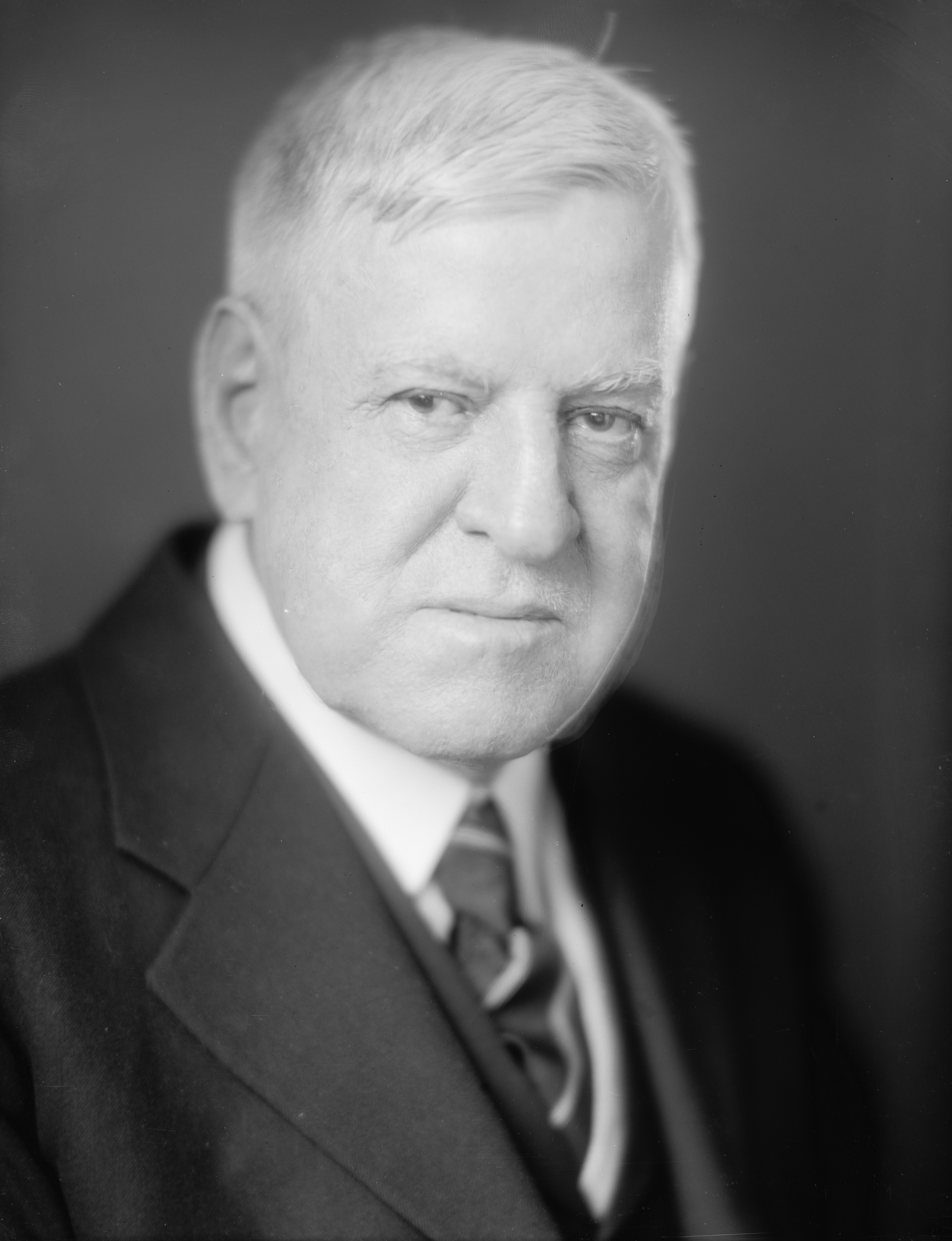
- Harris & Ewing portrait of Dial, taken between 1905 and 1945

United States Senator from South Carolina
- In office March 4, 1919 – March 3, 1925
- Preceded by: William P. Pollock
- Succeeded by: Coleman L. Blease

Personal details
- Born: Nathaniel Barksdale Dial; April 24, 1862 Laurens, South Carolina, US
- Died: December 11, 1940 (aged 78) Washington, D.C., US
- Party: Democratic
- Occupation: Politician, lawyer

Nathaniel Barksdale Dial (April 24, 1862 – December 11, 1940) was an American politician and lawyer. A Democrat, he was a member of the United States Senate from South Carolina.

== Early life and education ==
Dial was born on April 24, 1862, near Laurens, South Carolina, the son of Albert Dial and Martha Rebecca (née Barksdale) Dial. He grew up on a farm. Educated at common schools, he studied at the University of Richmond, Vanderbilt University, and the University of Virginia School of Law, graduating from the lattermost in 1883.

== Career ==
Also in 1883, Dial was admitted to the bar, after which he began practice in Laurens. Inspired by the New South, he also participated in the banking and manufacturing industries. He founded numerous companies in South Carolina.

Dial was a Democrat. He was a delegate to the 1888 Democratic National Convention. From 1887 to 1891, and again in 1895, he was the mayor of Laurens. While mayor, he brought several utilities to the city, such as water and telecommunications. In 1893, he was offered the position of consul to Zurich by President Grover Cleveland, but refused.

Dial was an unsuccessful candidate in the 1912 United States Senate election in South Carolina. He was a member of the Senate from March 4, 1919, to March 3, 1925. Ideologically, he was conservative, though Keith T. Poole claims he was liberal. He opposed child labor laws, minimum wage, and bonuses to World War I veterans. He was not nominated for the following election. He was an unsuccessful candidate in the 1926 election.

After serving in Congress, Dial returned to practicing law between Washington, D.C. and South Carolina. He also continued his participation in the South Carolina manufacturing business.

== Personal life and death ==
On November 4, 1883, Dial married Ruth Mitchell, with whom he had six children. She died in 1900, and in 1906 he married Josephine Minter, with whom he had two more children. He died on December 11, 1940, aged 78, in Washington, D.C., from a myocardial infraction, and was buried at Laurens City Cemetery. An archive of his papers is held by Duke University.

Party political offices
Preceded by William P. Pollock	Democratic nominee for U.S. Senator from South Carolina (Class 2); 1918	Succeeded by Coleman Livingston Blease
U.S. Senate
Preceded by William P. Pollock	U.S. senator (Class 2) from South Carolina; 1919–1925; Served alongside: Ellison D. Smith	Succeeded by Coleman L. Blease
