= William P. Pollock =

American politician

William Pegues Pollock
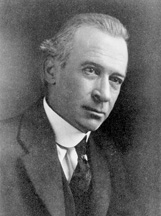

United States Senator from South Carolina
- In office November 6, 1918 – March 4, 1919
- Preceded by: Christie Benet
- Succeeded by: Nathaniel B. Dial

Member of the South Carolina House of Representatives from the Chesterfield County district
- In office January 13, 1903 – February 17, 1906
- In office November 27, 1894 – February 16, 1898

Personal details
- Born: December 9, 1870 Cheraw, South Carolina, U.S.
- Died: June 2, 1922 (aged 51) Cheraw, South Carolina, U.S.
- Party: Democratic

William Pegues Pollock (December 9, 1870 – June 2, 1922) was a United States senator from South Carolina.

Born near Cheraw, he attended public and private schools and the University of South Carolina at Columbia. He graduated from the law department of that university in 1891 and served as clerk of the Committee on the District of Columbia in the United States House of Representatives from 1891 to 1893. He was admitted to the bar the latter year and commenced practice in Cheraw. He also engaged in agricultural pursuits, and was a member of the South Carolina House of Representatives from 1894 to 1898.

Pollock was a presidential elector on the Democratic ticket in 1900 and was elected to the South Carolina House of Representatives in 1902, 1904, and 1906. He was an unsuccessful candidate for election to the Sixty-second Congress, but was elected on November 5, 1918, as a Democrat to the United States Senate to fill the vacancy caused by the death of Benjamin R. Tillman and served from November 6, 1918, to March 4, 1919. While in the Senate he was chairman of the Committee on National Banks (Sixty-fifth Congress).

William Pollock resumed the practice of law in Cheraw and died there in 1922; interment was in St. David's Cemetery.

Party political offices
First	Democratic nominee for U.S. Senator from South Carolina (Class 2); 1918	Succeeded by Nathaniel B. Dial
U.S. Senate
Preceded by Christie Benet	U.S. senator (Class 2) from South Carolina; 1918-1919; Served alongside: Ellison D. Smith	Succeeded by Nathaniel B. Dial
