= Christie Benet =

American politician (1879–1951)

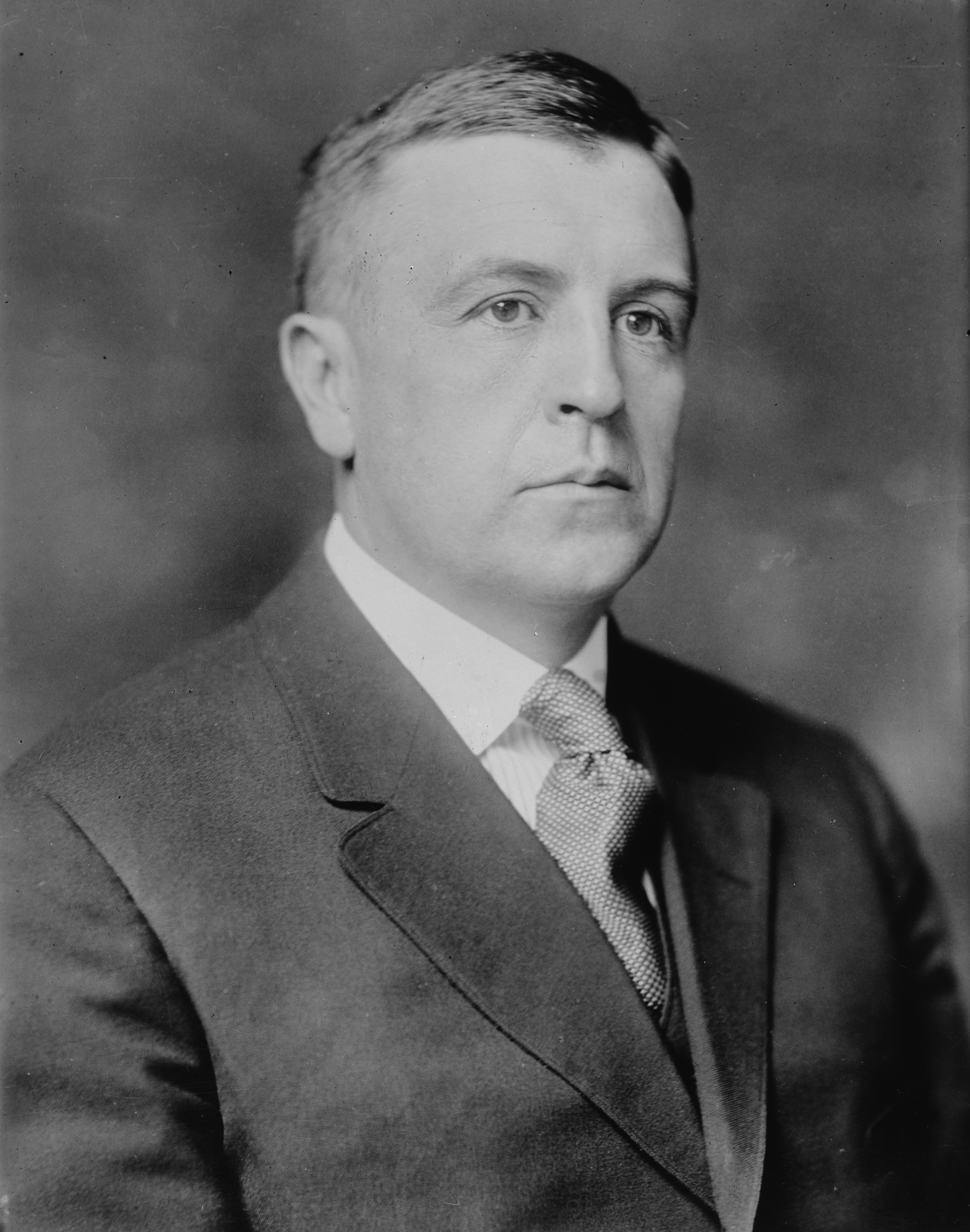

United States Senator from South Carolina
- In office July 6, 1918 – November 5, 1918
- Appointed by: Richard Irvine Manning III
- Preceded by: Benjamin Tillman
- Succeeded by: William P. Pollock

Personal details
- Born: December 26, 1879 Abbeville, South Carolina, U.S.
- Died: March 30, 1951 (aged 71) Columbia, South Carolina, U.S.
- Party: Democratic

William Christie Benet Jr. (December 26, 1879 – March 30, 1951) was an American attorney and Democratic Party politician who briefly represented the state of South Carolina in the United States Senate in 1918, filling the vacancy left by the death of Ben Tillman.

== Early years ==
Benet was born in Abbeville, South Carolina to William Christie and Susan (née McGowan) Benet. His father was born in Scotland. He attended the common schools in his youth, and matriculated at the College of Charleston, the University of South Carolina, and the University of Virginia, where he graduated in 1902.

=== Football ===
He played college football as a guard at South Carolina and was a star tackle for Virginia, selected All-Southern in 1901.

Benet coached football at South Carolina in 1903 and 1907. He assisted coach and Virginia teammate Bob Williams in 1902, when Carolina upset John Heisman's Clemson team.

== Law career ==
He studied the law, and upon his admission to the bar began practice in Columbia, South Carolina, in 1903. Solicitor of the fifth judicial circuit in 1908–09, Benet became Columbia's city attorney from 1910 to 1912. He was the secretary of the Democratic State committee three times. Benet also served as counsel for the Southern Cotton Seed Crushers Association for over 25 years.

=== Senator ===
On July 6, 1918 he was appointed to the Senate to fill out the term of Benjamin R. Tillman, who died in office. He served until November 5, when a successor to the position was elected; Benet himself was an unsuccessful candidate in the same election to fill the vacancy. During his brief time in the Senate, Benet was the chairman of the Committee on National Banks; upon his defeat, he resumed his practice.

=== State hospital ===
From 1915 he was a member of the board of regents of the South Carolina State Hospital, later becoming the chairman of the board; in this capacity he served until 1946.

=== War and death ===
==== World War II ====
During World War II Benet chaired the War Finance Committee for South Carolina.

== Personal life and death ==
Benet married Alice Van Yeveren Haskell in 1908; they had two children, a son and a daughter.

He was a member of Trinity Episcopal Church, serving as a churchwarden and later a member of the vestry. Benet was also a member of the standing committee of the Diocese of Upper South Carolina.

He was serving as the chairman of the Alien Enemy Hearing Board for the state's eastern district at his death; he died in Columbia, and was interred locally in Elmwood Cemetery. Benet Hall, a residence hall at Clemson University, is named in his honor.

In a memorial to Benet published in the South Carolina Law Review, South Carolina law professor Charles B. Elliott stated,

"Christie Benet possessed a profound reverence for the law and the courts. Those associated with him in any important case, as was the writer's good fortune, can never forget his allegiance to the sovereign power of the law and the majesty of constitutions. It was inconceivable to his great mind and heart that a decision of a court could be affected by any consideration other than supreme allegiance to settled legal principles."

== Head coaching record ==
Year	Team	Overall	Conference	Standing	Bowl/playoffs
South Carolina Gamecocks (Independent) (1904–1905)
1904	South Carolina	4–3–1			
1905	South Carolina	4–2–1			
South Carolina Gamecocks (Independent) (1908–1909)
1908	South Carolina	3–5–1			
1909	South Carolina	2–6			
South Carolina:		13–16–3			
Total:		13–16–3			

U.S. Senate
Preceded by Benjamin Tillman	U.S. senator (Class 2) from South Carolina; 1918; Served alongside: Ellison D. Smith	Succeeded by William P. Pollock
