= 1936 United States Senate election in South Carolina =

1936 Democratic Senate primary in South Carolina
- September 6, 1936
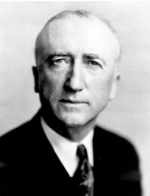

Nominee	James F. Byrnes	Thomas P. Stoney
Party	Democratic	Democratic
Popular vote	257,247	25,627
Percentage	87.08%	8.67%
- Results by county Byrnes: 50–60% 60–70% 70–80% 80–90% >90%
U.S. senator before election
James F. Byrnes
Democratic
Elected U.S. Senator
James F. Byrnes
Democratic

The 1936 South Carolina United States Senate election was held on November 2, 1936, to select the U.S. Senator from the state of South Carolina. Incumbent Democratic Senator James F. Byrnes won the Democratic primary and defeated two Republican candidates in the general election to win another six-year term.

== Democratic primary ==
=== Candidates ===
- James F. Byrnes, incumbent Senator since 1931
- William C. Harllee, Army colonel
- Thomas P. Stoney, former Mayor of Charleston

=== Campaign ===
Byrnes was criticized for his enthusiastic support of the President Roosevelt's New Deal and both Stoney and Harillee argued that the New Deal's agriculture programs were destroying states' rights in South Carolina and bringing the state into the fold of a federal bureaucracy, but Byrnes responded by stating the New Deal was needed to assist South Carolinians during the economic hardships of the Great Depression and pointed out that agricultural prices had improved because of it.

=== Results ===
The attacks on Byrnes would be very ineffective and he went on to win the primary with over 87% of the vote.

Democratic Primary
Candidate	Votes	%
James F. Byrnes	257,247	87.1
Thomas Porcher Stoney	25,627	8.7
William Curry Harllee	12,551	4.2

== General election ==
=== Campaign ===
General Election Byrnes: 90–100% 100%

Since the end of Reconstruction in 1877, the Democratic Party dominated the politics of South Carolina and its statewide candidates were never seriously challenged. Byrnes did not campaign for the general election as there was no chance of defeat. The Republicans were split between two factions that wanted to control the spoils system should a Republican victory occur in the Presidential election. They did not compete against Byrnes, but were rather competing against each other to show the national Republican Party who held more influence in the state.

=== Results ===
South Carolina U.S. Senate Election, 1936
Party	Candidate	Votes	%	±%
Democratic	James F. Byrnes (incumbent)	113,696	98.56%	−1.44%
Tolbert Republican	Joseph Augustis Tolbert	961	0.83%	N/A
Hambright Republican	Marion W. Seabrook	702	0.61%	N/A
No party	Write-Ins	1	0.00%	N/A
Majority		112,735	97.72%	−2.28%
Turnout		115,360		
Democratic hold				

== See also ==
- List of United States senators from South Carolina
- United States Senate elections, 1936
- United States House of Representatives elections in South Carolina, 1936
