= John J. McSwain =

American politician

John Jackson McSwain
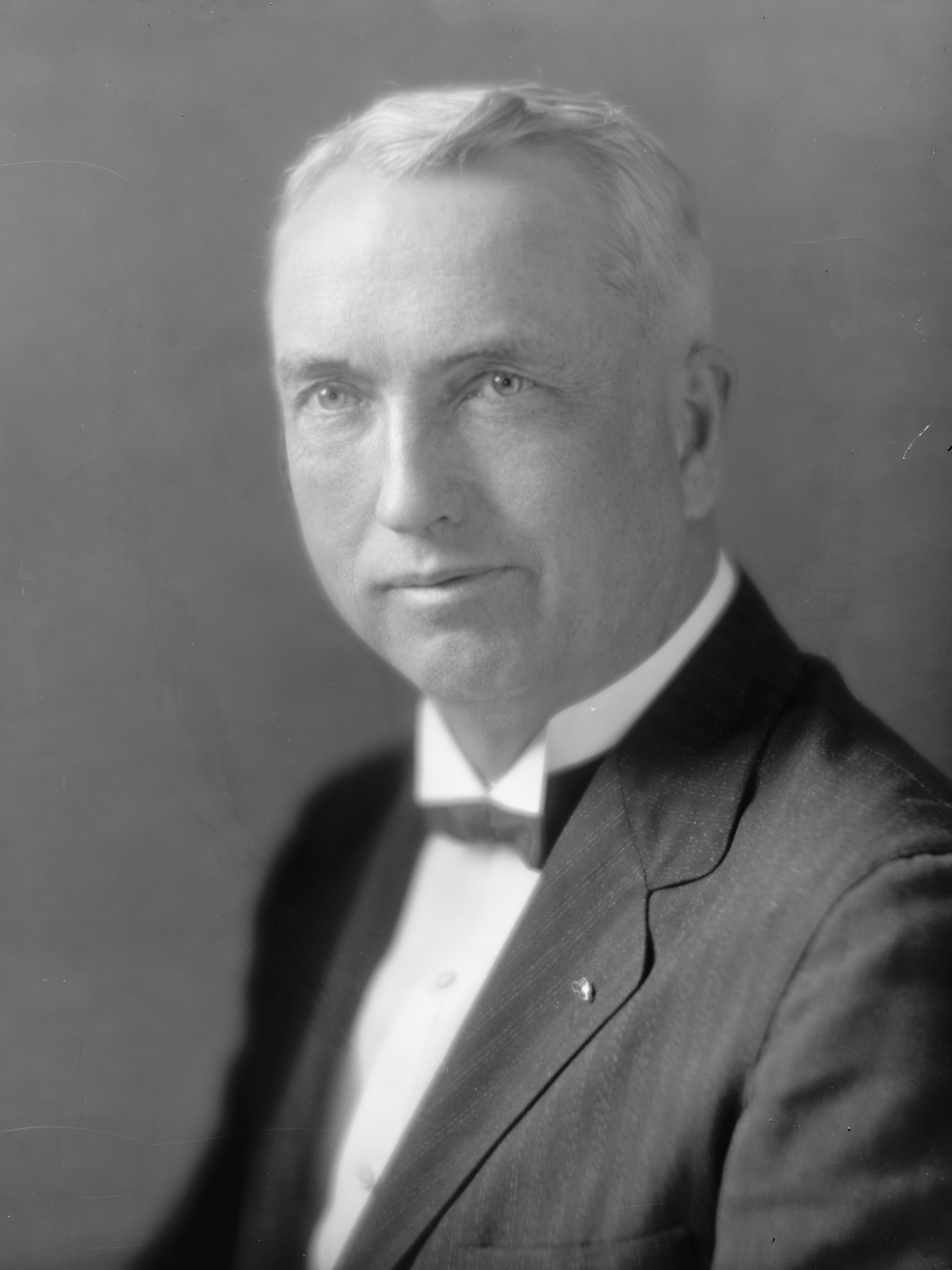

Member of the U.S. House of Representatives from South Carolina's 4th district
- In office March 4, 1921 – August 6, 1936
- Preceded by: Samuel J. Nicholls
- Succeeded by: Gabriel H. Mahon, Jr.

Personal details
- Born: May 1, 1875 Cross Hill, South Carolina, U.S.
- Died: August 6, 1936 (aged 61) Columbia, South Carolina, U.S.
- Resting place: Springwood Cemetery; Greenville, South Carolina
- Party: Democratic
- Education: University of South Carolina
- Profession: Attorney
- Committees: House Military Affairs Committee

Military service
- Allegiance: United States of America
- Branch/service: United States Army
- Years of service: 1917–1919
- Rank: Captain
- Unit: 154th Infantry
- Battles/wars: First World War

John Jackson McSwain (May 1, 1875 – August 6, 1936) was a U.S. representative from South Carolina.

Born on a farm near Cross Hill, South Carolina, McSwain attended the public schools. He graduated from Wofford College Fitting School in 1893 and from the University of South Carolina at Columbia in 1897. He taught school in Marlboro, Abbeville, and Anderson Counties. He studied law. He was admitted to the bar in 1901 and commenced practice in Greenville, South Carolina. He served as a referee in bankruptcy from 1912 to 1917. He entered the officers' training camp at Fort Oglethorpe, Georgia, May 12, 1917, and served in the First World War as captain of Company A, One Hundred and Fifty-fourth Infantry, until March 6, 1919, when he was honorably discharged. He resumed the practice of law in Greenville, South Carolina.

McSwain was elected as a Democrat to the Sixty-seventh and to the seven succeeding Congresses and served from March 4, 1921, until his death. He served as chairman of the Committee on Military Affairs (Seventy-second through Seventy-fourth Congresses). He declined to be a candidate for renomination in 1936. He died in Columbia, South Carolina, on August 6, 1936. He was interred in Springwood Cemetery, Greenville, South Carolina.

== See also ==
- List of members of the United States Congress who died in office (1900–1949)

== Sources ==
- United States Congress. "John J. McSwain (id: M000604)". Biographical Directory of the United States Congress.

U.S. House of Representatives
Preceded by Samuel J. Nicholls	Member of the U.S. House of Representatives from South Carolina's 4th congressional district 1921 – 1936	Succeeded by Gabriel H. Mahon, Jr.
