= 1918 United States Senate election in South Carolina =

1918 Democratic Senate primary in South Carolina
- August 27, 1918
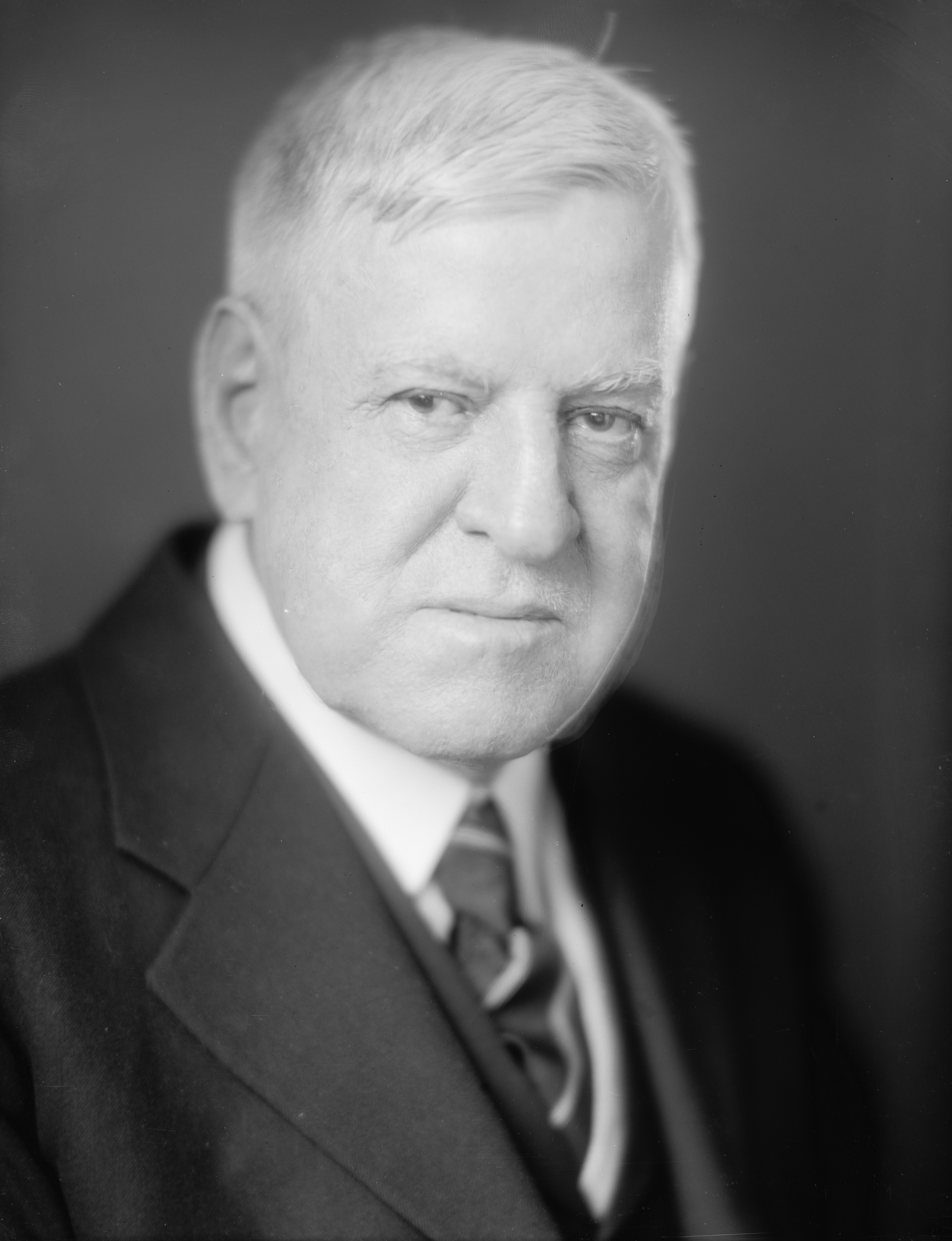

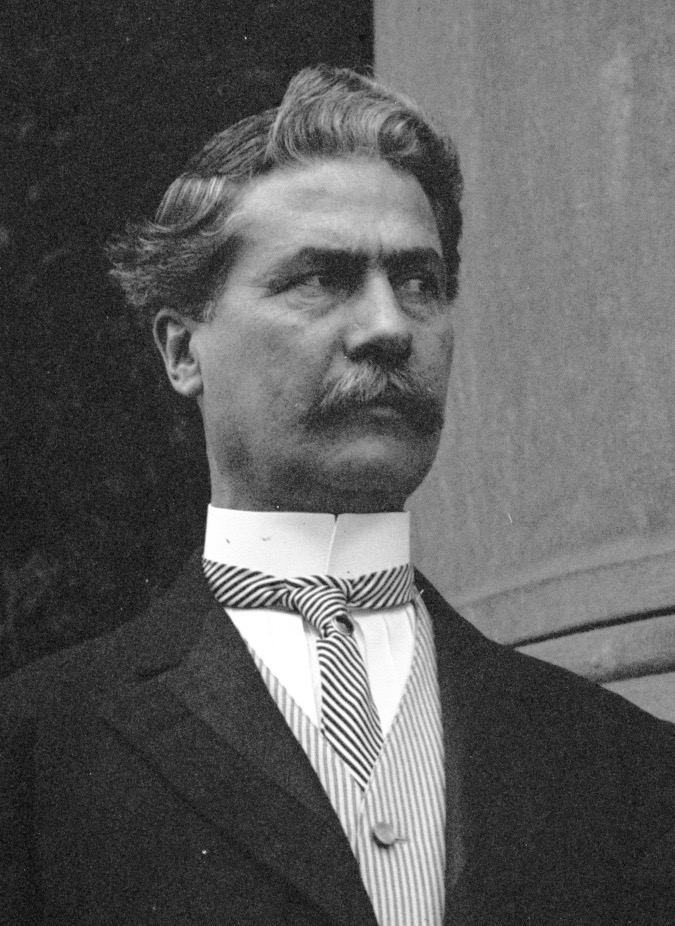
| Nominee | Nathaniel Dial | Cole Blease |
| Party | Democratic | Democratic |
| Popular vote | 65,064 | 40,456 |
| Percentage | 58.70% | 36.50% |
United States Senator before election
Christie Benet
Democratic
Elected United States Senator
Nathaniel B. Dial
Democratic

The 1918 South Carolina United States Senate election was held on Tuesday, November 5, simultaneously with the special senate election to elect the United States Senator for a full six-year term from South Carolina. Nathaniel B. Dial won the Democratic primary and was unopposed in the general election.

== Democratic primary ==
=== Candidates ===
- Coleman Livingston Blease, former governor of South Carolina
- Nathaniel B. Dial, former mayor of Laurens and candidate for Senate in 1912
- James F. Rice
- Benjamin Tillman, incumbent senator since 1895 (died July 3)

=== Campaign ===
The primary election in 1918 for Senate was shaping up to be a contentious affair between Ben Tillman and Cole Blease, two of the state's most notorious demagogues. Blease had performed surprisingly well in the 1916 gubernatorial election where he had almost knocked off incumbent Governor Richard Irvine Manning III. The death of Tillman in July ended all prospects of an epic battle and the race became a contest between Blease and Nathaniel B. Dial. The South Carolina Democratic Party held the primary on August 27 and Dial garnered over 50% of the vote to avoid a runoff election. Blease suffered the worst loss of his political career mainly because of his vitriolic opposition to World War I which made him appear as a traitor. There was no opposition to the Democratic candidate in the general election so Dial was elected to a six-year term in the Senate.

=== Results ===
Democratic Primary
| Candidate | Votes | % |
|---|---|---|
| Nathaniel B. Dial | 65,064 | 58.7 |
| Coleman Livingston Blease | 40,456 | 36.5 |
| James F. Rice | 5,317 | 4.8 |

== General election results ==
South Carolina U.S. Senate Election, 1918
| Party | Candidate | Votes | % | ±% |
|---|---|---|---|---|
| Democratic | Nathaniel B. Dial | 25,792 | 100.0 | 0.0 |
| Majority | | 25,792 | 100.0 | 0.0 |
| Turnout | | 25,792 | | |
| Democratic hold | | | | |

== See also ==
- List of United States senators from South Carolina
- 1918 United States Senate elections
- 1918 United States House of Representatives elections in South Carolina
- 1918 South Carolina gubernatorial election
