= Gabriel H. Mahon Jr. =

American politician

Gabriel Heyward Mahon Jr.
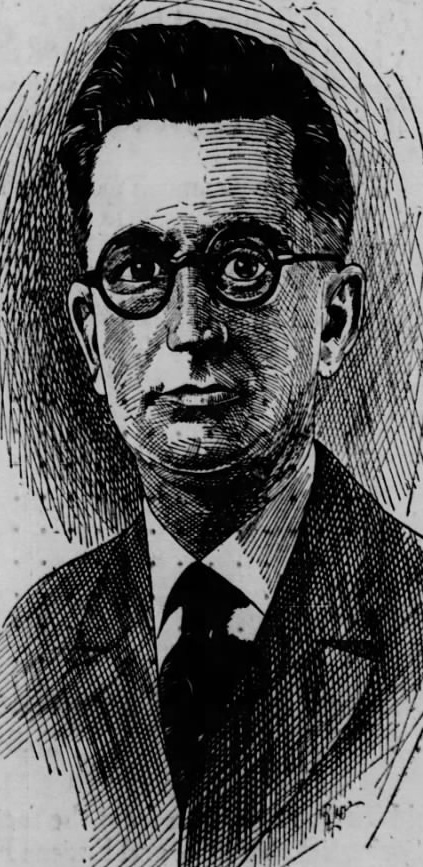
- From the July 2, 1922 edition of the Greenville News (Greenville, SC)

Member of the U.S. House of Representatives from South Carolina's 4th district
- In office November 3, 1936 – January 3, 1939
- Preceded by: John J. McSwain
- Succeeded by: Joseph R. Bryson

Personal details
- Born: November 11, 1889 Williamston, South Carolina, U.S.
- Died: June 11, 1962 (aged 72) Greenville, South Carolina, U.S.
- Resting place: Greenville, South Carolina
- Party: Democratic
- Parent(s): Gabriel Heyward Mahon, Sr., Mary Theresa Brown Mahon
- Education: The Citadel
- Profession: Businessman
- Awards: Silver Star, Purple Heart

Military service
- Allegiance: United States of America
- Branch/service: United States Army
- Years of service: 1917–1919
- Rank: Major
- Commands: 1st Battalion, 118th Infantry
- Battles/wars: First World War

Gabriel Heyward Mahon Jr. (November 11, 1889 – June 11, 1962) was a U.S. representative from South Carolina.

G. Heyward Mahon Jr. was born in Williamston, South Carolina, and moved with his parents to Greenville, South Carolina in 1898. His father, Gabriel Heyward Mahon Sr., was a successful merchant who served as mayor of Greenville. The younger Mahon attended the public schools and graduated from Greenville High School in 1904. He attended The Citadel in Charleston, South Carolina for two years as a member of the Class of 1909 before withdrawing to begin a business career. He was employed as a clerk in his father's retail store from 1900 to 1907, and as a traveling salesman from 1907 to 1911. In 1911, Mahon started his own retail clothing business in Greenville.

Mahon served in the National Guard before World War I. During the war, he served in the United States Army as a captain and later major in 1st Battalion, 118th Infantry regiment, 30th Division. He was awarded the Purple Heart and the Silver Star.

After the war, he was active in the American Legion, including service as South Carolina's state commander. He was a trustee of Greenville Woman's College from 1921 to 1936.

Mahon was elected as a Democrat to the Seventy-fourth Congress to fill the vacancy caused by the death of John J. McSwain and on the same day was elected to the Seventy-fifth Congress and served from November 3, 1936, to January 3, 1939. He was an unsuccessful candidate for renomination in 1938.

After leaving Congress, Mahon resumed former business pursuits in Greenville. During World War II, he was executive director of South Carolina's Council of defense.

Mahon died in Greenville on June 11, 1962. He was interred in Woodlawn Memorial Park Mausoleum.

== Sources ==
- United States Congress. "Gabriel H. Mahon Jr. (id: M000064)". Biographical Directory of the United States Congress.
- G. Heyward Mahon Jr. at The Political Graveyard
- Hayes, J. I. (2001). South Carolina and the New Deal. Columbia, SC: University of South Carolina Press. p. 21. ISBN 978-1-57003-399-5.

U.S. House of Representatives
Preceded by John J. McSwain	Member of the U.S. House of Representatives from South Carolina's 4th congressional district 1936–1939	Succeeded by Joseph R. Bryson
