= List of elections in 1941 =

The following elections occurred in the year 1941.

== Africa ==
- 1941 Lagos by-election
- 1941 Northern Rhodesian general election

== Asia ==
- 1941 Iranian legislative election

=== Philippines ===
- 1941 Philippine House of Representatives elections
- 1941 Philippine Senate election
- 1941 Philippine general election
- 1941 Philippine presidential election

== Europe ==
=== United Kingdom ===
- 1941 Berwick-upon-Tweed by-election
- 1941 Bodmin by-election
- 1941 Carmarthen by-election
- 1941 Edinburgh Central by-election
- 1941 Edinburgh West by-election
- 1941 Greenock by-election
- 1941 Hampstead by-election
- 1941 Hornsey by-election
- 1941 Lancaster by-election
- 1941 Mansfield by-election
- 1941 Pontefract by-election
- 1941 Scarborough and Whitby by-election
- 1941 West Bromwich by-election
- 1941 The Wrekin by-election

== North America ==
- 1941 Curaçao general election
- 1941 Dominican Republic Constitutional Assembly election
- 1941 Guatemalan presidential election

=== Canada ===
- 1941 British Columbia general election
- 1941 Edmonton municipal election
- 1941 Manitoba general election
- 1941 Nova Scotia general election
- 1941 Toronto municipal election

=== United States ===
==== United States lieutenant gubernatorial ====
- 1941 Virginia lieutenant gubernatorial election

==== United States gubernatorial ====
- 1941 United States gubernatorial elections
- 1941 Virginia gubernatorial election

==== United States House of Representatives ====
- 1941 United States House of Representatives elections

==== United States Senate ====
- 1941 United States Senate elections
- 1941 United States Senate special election in Mississippi
- 1941 United States Senate special election in South Carolina
- 1941 United States Senate special election in Texas

==== United States mayoral elections ====
- 1941 Boston mayoral election
- 1941 Cleveland mayoral election
- 1941 Hartford, Connecticut mayoral election
- 1941 Manchester, New Hampshire mayoral election
- 1941 New York City mayoral election
- 1941 Pittsburgh mayoral election
- 1941 Springfield mayoral election

== South America ==
- 1941 Chilean parliamentary election
- 1941 Colombian parliamentary election
- 1941 Venezuelan presidential election

== Oceania ==
=== Australia ===
- 1941 Boothby by-election
- 1941 New South Wales state election
- 1941 Queensland state election
- 1941 South Australian state election
- 1941 Tasmanian state election

== See also ==
- Category:1941 elections
