= 1941 United States Senate elections =

There were three special elections to the United States Senate in 1941 during the 77th United States Congress.

== Race summary ==
In these elections, the winners were elected in 1941 after January 3; sorted by election date.

| State | Incumbent | | | Results | Candidates |
| State | Senator | Party | Electoral history | Results | Candidates |
|---|---|---|---|---|---|
| Texas (Class 2) | Andrew Jackson Houston | Democratic | 1941 (Appointed) | Interim appointee died June 26, 1941. New senator elected June 28, 1941. Democratic hold. | ▌ ✓ W. Lee O'Daniel (Democratic) 30.49%; ▌Lyndon B. Johnson (Democratic) 30.26%; ▌Gerald Mann (Democratic) 24.45%; ▌Martin Dies Jr. (Democratic) 14.01%; ▌Others <1.0% |
| Mississippi (Class 2) | James Eastland | Democratic | 1941 (Appointed) | Interim appointee retired. New senator elected September 29, 1941. Democratic hold. | ▌ ✓ Wall Doxey (Democratic) 50.35%; ▌Ross A. Collins (Democratic) 49.65% |
| South Carolina (Class 2) | Roger C. Peace | Democratic | 1941 (Appointed) | Interim appointee retired. New senator elected September 30, 1941. Democratic hold. | ▌ ✓ Burnet R. Maybank (Democratic); Unopposed |

== Mississippi (special) ==
1941 United States Senate special election in Mississippi
- September 29, 1941
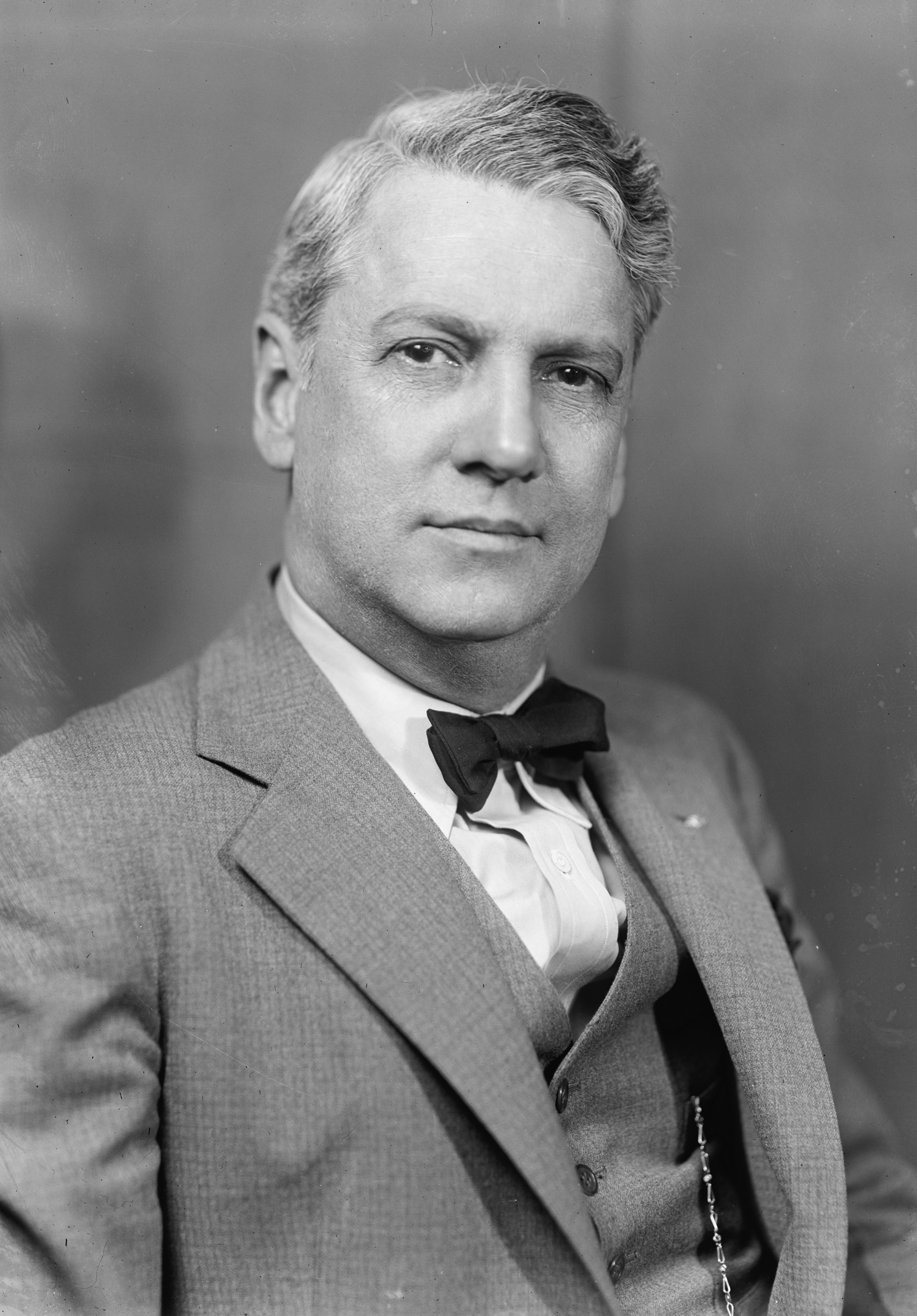

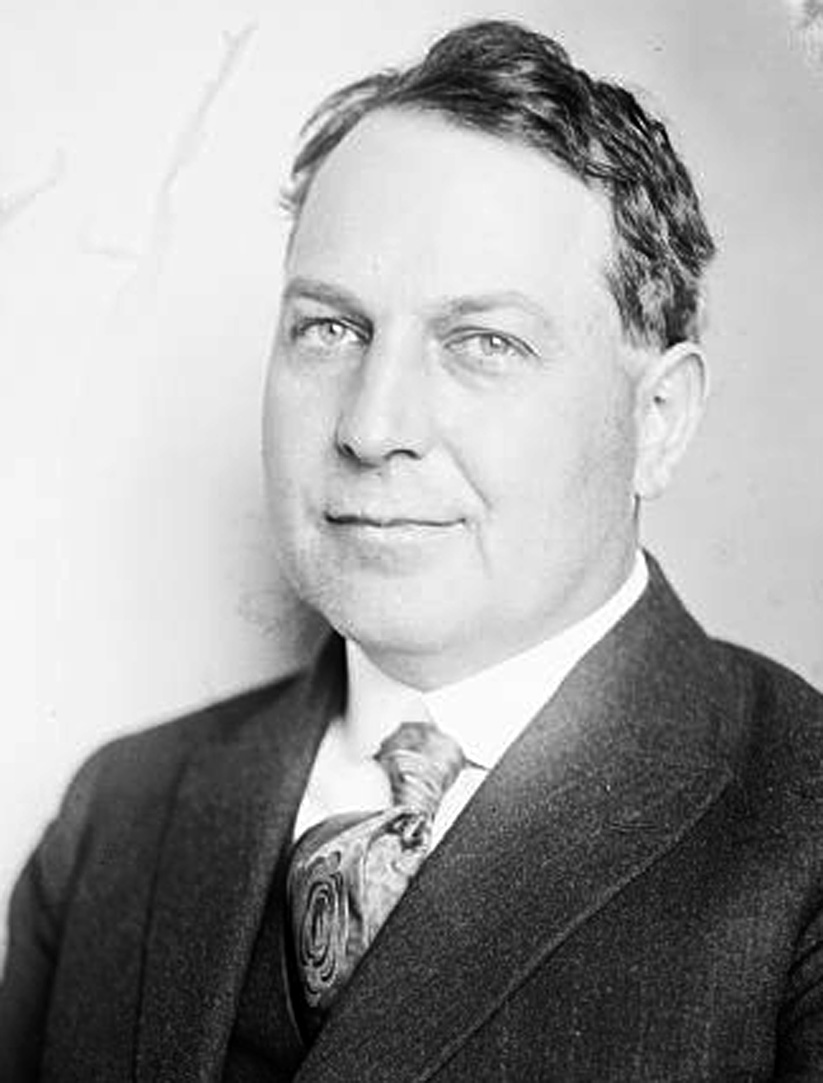
| Nominee | Wall Doxey | Ross A. Collins |
| Party | Democratic | Democratic |
| Popular vote | 59,556 | 58,738 |
| Percentage | 50.35% | 49.65% |
U.S. senator before election
James Eastland
Democratic
Elected U.S. Senator
Wall Doxey
Democratic

Four-term Democratic senator Pat Harrison died June 22, 1941, and Democrat James Eastland was appointed June 30, 1941, to continue the term. Democrat Wall Doxey won the September 29, 1941, special election, but would later lose renomination to Eastland for the next term in 1942.

== South Carolina (special) ==
1941 U.S. Senate Democratic primary runoff in South Carolina
- September 16, 1941
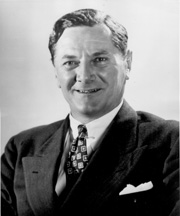

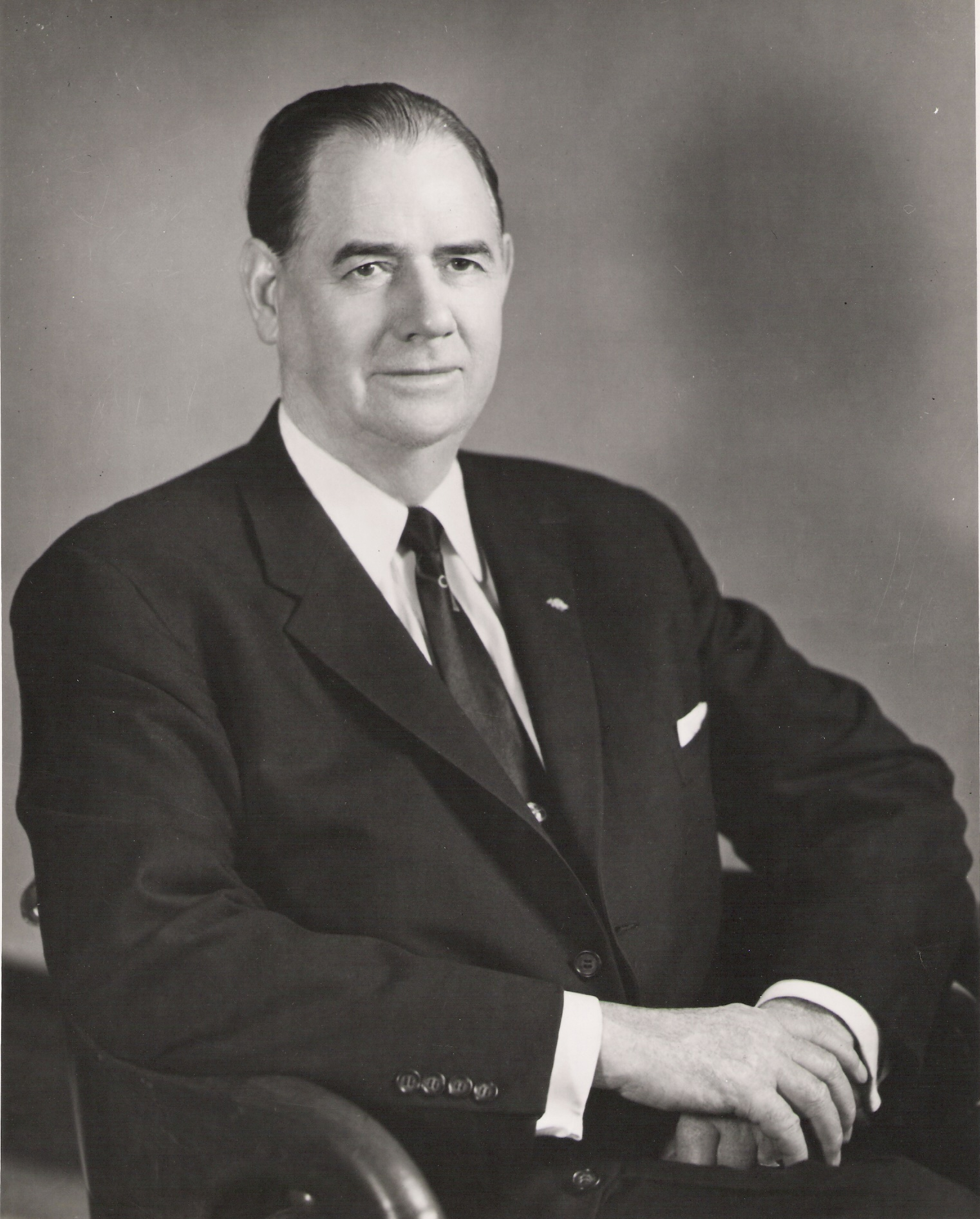
| Nominee | Burnet R. Maybank | Olin D. Johnston |
| Party | Democratic | Democratic |
| Popular vote | 92,100 | 70,687 |
| Percentage | 56.58% | 43.42% |
- County results Maybank: 50–60% 60–70% 70–80% 80–90% >90% Johnston: 50–60% 60–70%
U.S. senator before election
Roger C. Peace
Democratic
Elected U.S. Senator
Burnet R. Maybank
Democratic

James F. Byrnes (Democratic) had resigned July 8, 1941, and Alva Lumpkin (Democratic) was appointed July 22, 1941, to continue the term. Lumpkin died, however, August 1, 1941, so Roger C. Peace (Democratic) was then appointed August 5, 1941, to continue the term. Peace was not a candidate in the special election.

Governor Burnet R. Maybank took the most votes in the September 2, 1941, Democratic primary over Governor Olin Johnston and Representative Joseph R. Bryson. Maybank then won the September 16, 1941, primary runoff. Maybank won the general election unopposed and would serve through two general elections (1942 and 1948) until his death in 1954.

== Texas (special) ==
1941 United States Senate special election in Texas
- June 28, 1941
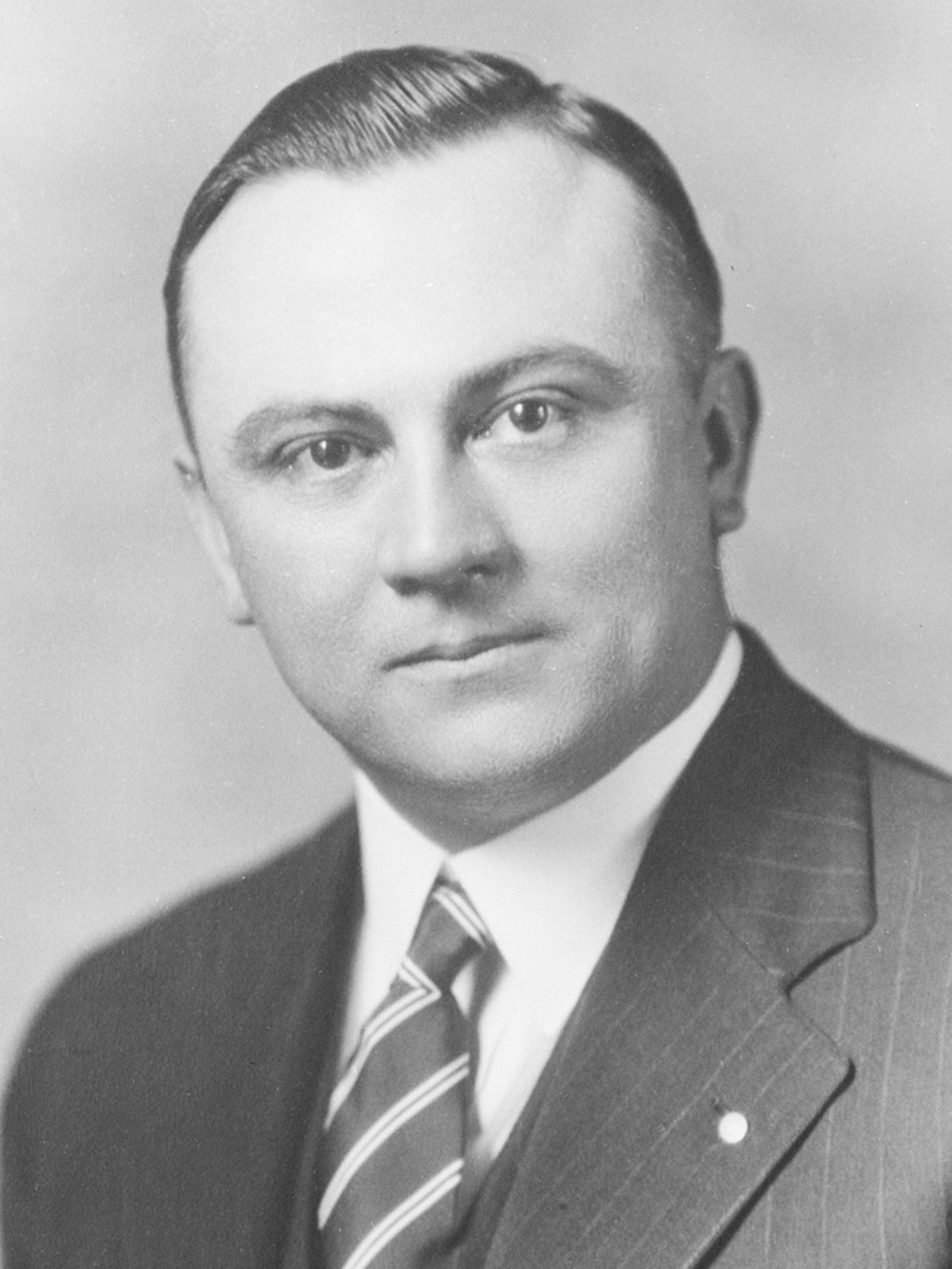

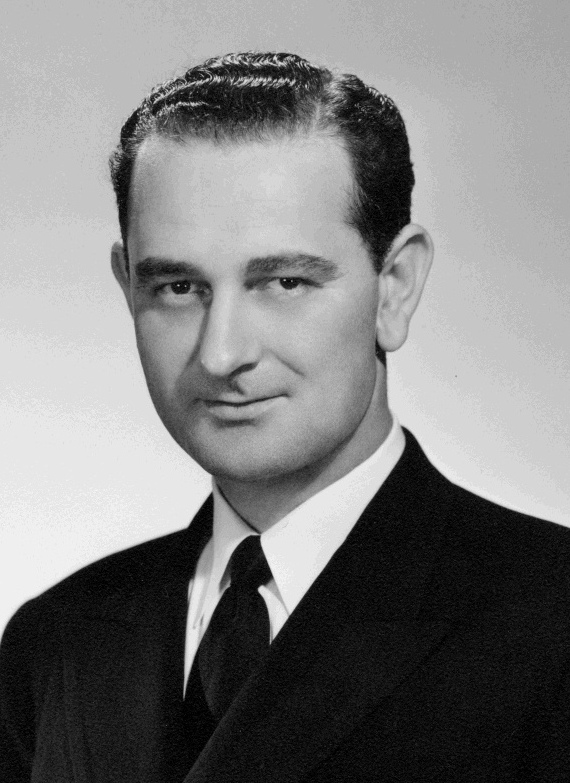

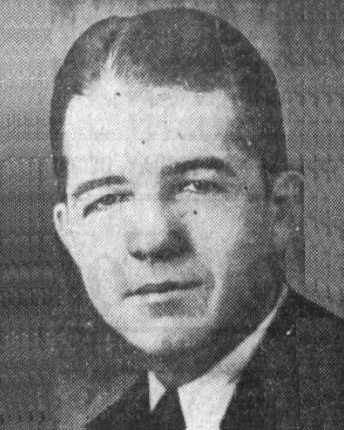

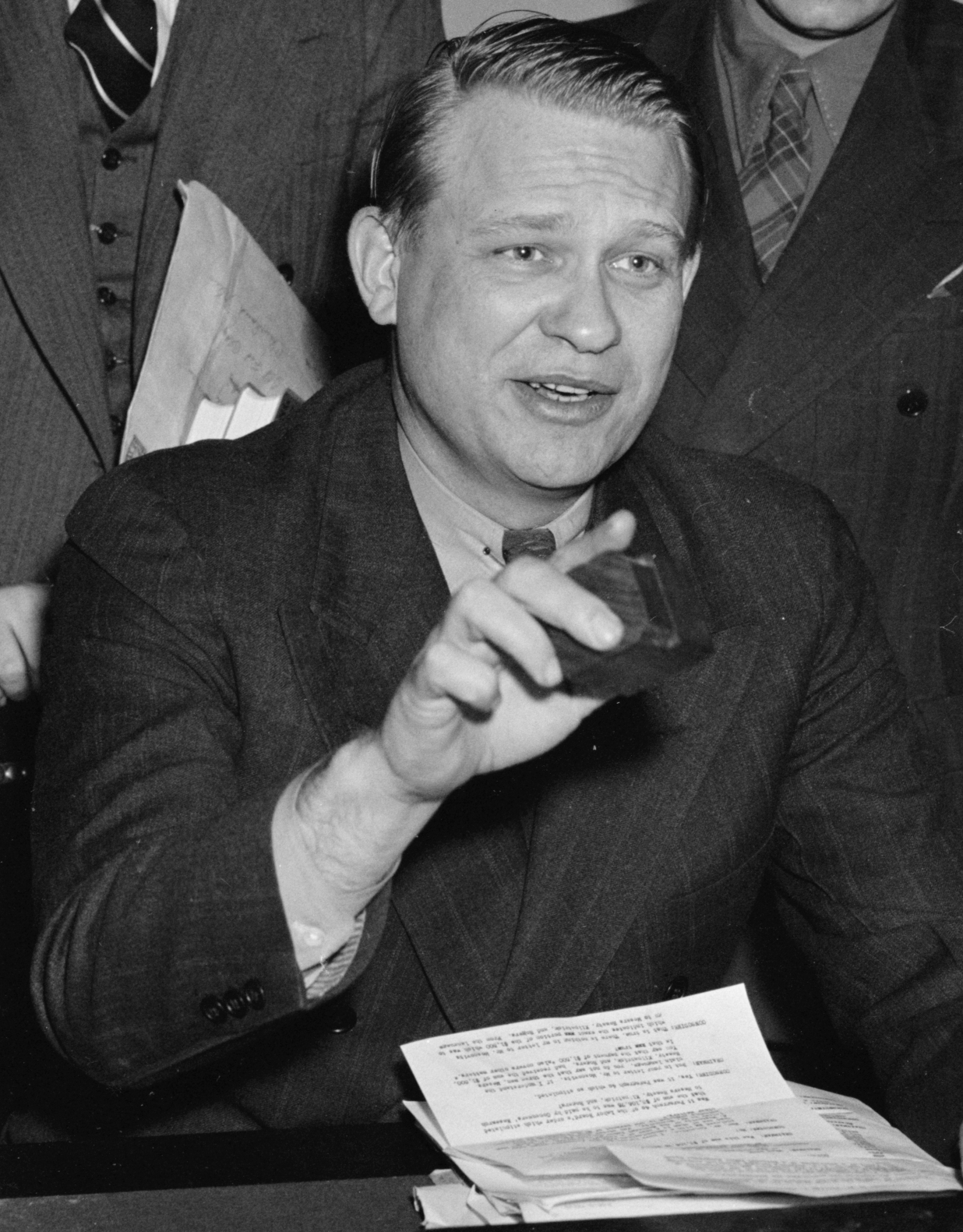
| Nominee | Pappy O'Daniel | Lyndon B. Johnson |
| Party | Democratic | Democratic |
| Popular vote | 175,590 | 174,279 |
| Percentage | 30.49% | 30.26% |
| Nominee | Gerald Mann | Martin Dies Jr. |
| Party | Democratic | Democratic |
| Popular vote | 140,807 | 80,653 |
| Percentage | 24.45% | 14.01% |
- O'Daniel: 20–30% 30–40% 40–50% 50–60% Johnson: 20–30% 30–40% 40–50% 50–60% 60–70% 70–80% >90% Mann: 20–30% 30–40% 40–50% 50–60% Dies: 20–30% 30–40% 40–50% 50–60% 60–70% 70–80%
U.S. senator before election
Andrew Jackson Houston
Democratic
Elected U.S. Senator
Pappy O'Daniel
Democratic

Democrat Morris Sheppard died April 9, 1941, and Democrat Andrew Jackson Houston was appointed April 21, 1941, to continue the term. Houston died, however, June 26, 1941, before the August 4, 1941, special election. In a 14-candidate race, "Pappy" W. Lee O'Daniel (Democratic) won a slim plurality over Representative Lyndon Baines Johnson (Democratic), which was sufficient for the election.
