= 1941 United States Senate special election in South Carolina =

1941 U.S. Senate Democratic primary runoff in South Carolina
- September 16, 1941
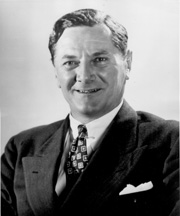

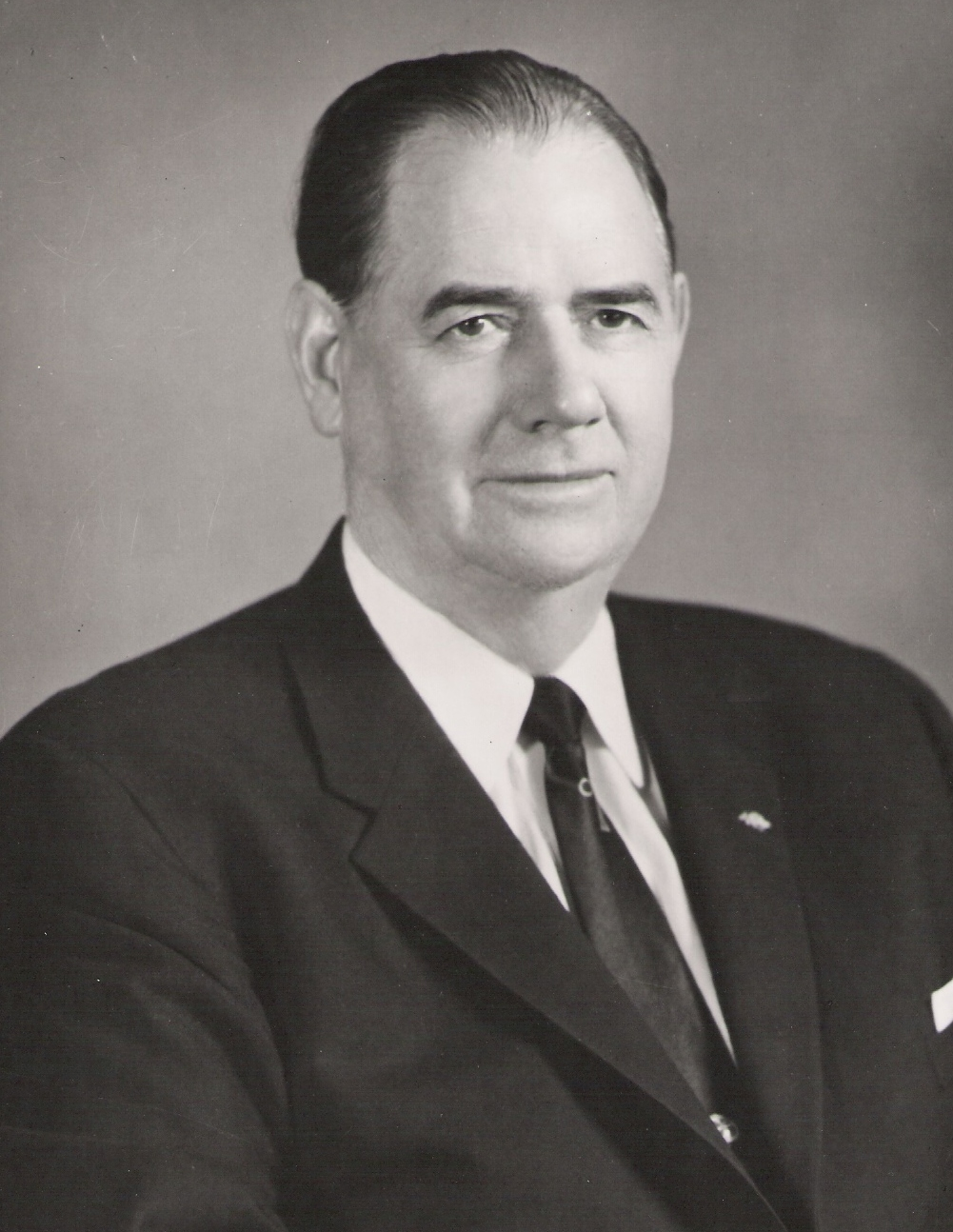
Nominee	Burnet R. Maybank	Olin D. Johnston
Party	Democratic	Democratic
Popular vote	92,100	70,687
Percentage	56.58%	43.42%
- County results Maybank: 50–60% 60–70% 70–80% 80–90% >90% Johnston: 50–60% 60–70%
U.S. senator before election
Roger C. Peace
Democratic
Elected U.S. Senator
Burnet R. Maybank
Democratic

The 1941 United States Senate special election in South Carolina was held on September 30, 1941 to complete the unexpired term of Senator James F. Byrnes, who resigned on July 8. Interim Senator Alva Lumpkin died on August 1 and in turn was succeeded by Roger C. Peace, who did not run for re-election.

The election was won by Governor Burnet R. Maybank who defeated former Governor Olin D. Johnston after a run-off in the primary. He was unopposed in the general election.

== Background ==
In 1937, Senator James F. Byrnes began a six-year term ending in 1943. On June 12, 1941, President Franklin D. Roosevelt nominated Byrnes as an associate justice of the United States Supreme Court, and he was confirmed that same day. (Note: Byrnes only joined the Court for 15 months; on October 3, 1942, between the 1942 primary and general elections, he resigned and was appointed as Roosevelt's Director of Economic Stabilization. He would later go on to serve as Director of War Mobilization and U.S. Secretary of State.) He resigned from the Senate on July 8, 1941.

To fill the vacancy until a successor could be duly elected, Governor of South Carolina Burnet R. Maybank appointed Judge Alva Lumpkin on July 22, 1941, but Lumpkin died on August 1, 1941. Maybank then appointed Roger C. Peace on August 5, 1941, to succeed Lumpkin. Peace did not run in the special election to complete the term.

== Democratic primary ==
The Democratic primary election was held on September 2, 1941. As no candidate won a majority of votes, a run-off was held between the top two candidates on September 16, 1941.

=== Candidates ===
- Joseph R. Bryson, incumbent U.S. Representative
- Olin D. Johnston, former Governor of South Carolina
- Burnet R. Maybank, incumbent Governor of South Carolina

=== Results ===
Democratic Primary
Candidate	Votes	%
Burnet R. Maybank	59,017	47.4
Olin D. Johnston	40,296	32.3
Joseph R. Bryson	25,257	20.3

=== Runoff ===
Democratic Primary Runoff
Candidate	Votes	%	±%
Burnet R. Maybank	92,100	56.6	+9.2
Olin D. Johnston	70,687	43.4	+11.1

== General election ==
=== Results ===
1941 U.S. Senate special election in South Carolina
Party	Candidate	Votes	%	±%
Democratic	Burnet R. Maybank	13,264	100.00%	
Turnout		13,264	100.00%	
Democratic hold		Swing		

== See also ==
- List of United States senators from South Carolina
- 1941 United States Senate elections
