= 1941 United States gubernatorial elections =

- November 4, 1941

1 governorship
	Majority party	Minority party
Party	Democratic	Republican
Seats before	28	20
Seats after	28	20
Seat change	Steady	Steady
Seats up	1	0
Seats won	1	0
- Democratic hold

United States gubernatorial elections were held in 1941, in the state of Virginia. Virginia holds its gubernatorial elections in odd numbered years, every 4 years, following the United States presidential election year.

== Race summary ==
=== Results ===
State	Incumbent	Party	First elected	Result	Candidates
Virginia	James Hubert Price	Democratic	1937	Incumbent term-limited. New governor elected. Democratic hold.	✓ Colgate Darden (Democratic) 80.58%; Benjamin Muse (Republican) 17.88%; Alice Burke (Communist) 0.90%; Hilliard Bernstein (Socialist) 0.64%
