= 1942 United States Senate election in South Carolina =

1942 Democratic Senate primary in South Carolina
- August 25, 1942
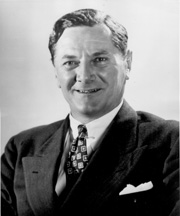

Nominee	Burnet R. Maybank	Eugene Blease
Party	Democratic	Democratic
Popular vote	120,731	114,241
Percentage	51.38%	48.62%
- County results Maybank: 50–60% 60–70% ... 80–90% Blease: 50–60% 60–70% ... 80–90%
U.S. senator before election
Burnet R. Maybank
Democratic
Elected U.S. Senator
Burnet R. Maybank
Democratic

The 1942 South Carolina United States Senate election was held on November 3, 1942, to select the U.S. Senator from the state of South Carolina. Incumbent Senator Burnet R. Maybank defeated Eugene S. Blease in the Democratic primary and was unopposed in the general election to win a six-year term.

== Background ==
In 1937, Senator James F. Byrnes began a six-year term ending in 1943, but President Franklin D. Roosevelt appointed him to the Supreme Court in 1940. (Note: Byrnes only joined the Court for 15 months; on October 3, between the 1942 primary and general elections, he resigned and was appointed as Roosevelt's Director of Economic Stabilization. He would later go on to serve as Director of War Mobilization and U.S. Secretary of State.) To fill the vacancy until a successor could be duly elected, Governor of South Carolina Burnet R. Maybank appointed Judge Alva Lumpkin, but Lumpkin died on August 1, 1941. Maybank then appointed Roger C. Peace to succeed Lumpkin. Peace did not run in the special election to complete the term.

In the special election to complete Byrnes's unexpired term on November, Governor Maybank defeated former Governor Olin D. Johnston.

== Democratic primary ==
=== Candidates ===
- Burnet R. Maybank, incumbent Senator since 1941
- Eugene Satterwhite Blease, former Chief Justice of the South Carolina Supreme Court and half-brother of former Governor and Senator Cole Blease

=== Campaign ===
Maybank campaigned in support of the Roosevelt administration and defeated Blease in the primary election on August 25.

=== Results ===
Democratic Primary
Candidate	Votes	%
Burnet R. Maybank	120,731	51.4
Eugene S. Blease	114,241	48.6

== General election ==
There was no opposition to the Democratic candidate in the general election so Maybank was elected to a six-year term in the Senate.

South Carolina U.S. Senate Election, 1942
Party	Candidate	Votes	%	±%
Democratic	Burnet R. Maybank (incumbent)	22,556	99.99%	+1.43%
No party	Write-Ins	2	0.01%	N/A
Majority		22,554	99.98%	+2.26%
Turnout		22,558		
Democratic hold				

65+% won by Maybank

== See also ==
- List of United States senators from South Carolina
- 1942 United States Senate elections
- 1942 United States House of Representatives elections in South Carolina
- 1942 South Carolina gubernatorial election
