= Judge Glenn =

Judge Glenn may refer to:

- Elias Glenn (1769–1846), judge of the United States District Court for the District of Maryland
- John Glenn (judge) (1795–1853), judge of the United States District Court for the District of Maryland
- John Lyles Glenn Jr. (1892–1938), judge of the United States District Courts for the Eastern and Western Districts of South Carolina
