= Senator Lumpkin =

Senator Lumpkin may refer to:

- Alva M. Lumpkin (1886–1941), U.S. Senator from South Carolina in 1941
- Wilson Lumpkin (1783–1870), U.S. Senator from Georgia from 1837 to 1841
