= 1942 United States House of Representatives elections in South Carolina =

- November 3, 1942

All 6 South Carolina seats to the United States House of Representatives
| | Majority party |
|---|---|
| Party | Democratic |
| Last election | 6 |
| Seats won | 6 |
| Seat change | Steady |
District results
Democratic
90–100%

The 1942 United States House of Representatives elections in South Carolina were held on November 3, 1942, to select six Representatives for two-year terms from the state of South Carolina. All six incumbents were re-elected and the composition of the state delegation remained solely Democratic.

== 1st congressional district ==
Incumbent Democratic Congressman L. Mendel Rivers of the 1st congressional district, in office since 1941, was unopposed in his bid for re-election.

=== General election results ===
South Carolina's 1st congressional district election results, 1942
| Party | Candidate | Votes | % | ±% |
|---|---|---|---|---|
| Democratic | L. Mendel Rivers (incumbent) | 5,452 | 100.0 | +1.7 |
| Majority | | 5,452 | 100.0 | +3.3 |
| Turnout | | 5,452 | | |
| Democratic hold | | | | |

== 2nd congressional district ==
Incumbent Democratic Congressman Hampton P. Fulmer of the 2nd congressional district, in office since 1921, was unopposed in his bid for re-election.

=== General election results ===
South Carolina's 2nd congressional district election results, 1942
| Party | Candidate | Votes | % | ±% |
|---|---|---|---|---|
| Democratic | Hampton P. Fulmer (incumbent) | 4,448 | 100.0 | +1.4 |
| Majority | | 4,448 | 100.0 | +2.8 |
| Turnout | | 4,448 | | |
| Democratic hold | | | | |

== 3rd congressional district ==
Incumbent Democratic Congressman Butler B. Hare of the 3rd congressional district, in office since 1939, defeated former Representative John C. Taylor in the Democratic primary and was unopposed in the general election.

=== Democratic primary ===
Democratic primary
| Candidate | Votes | % |
|---|---|---|
| Butler B. Hare | 26,280 | 61.8 |
| John C. Taylor | 16,227 | 38.2 |

=== General election results ===
South Carolina's 3rd congressional district election results, 1942
| Party | Candidate | Votes | % | ±% |
|---|---|---|---|---|
| Democratic | Butler B. Hare (incumbent) | 3,201 | 100.0 | +0.7 |
| Majority | | 3,201 | 100.0 | +1.4 |
| Turnout | | 3,201 | | |
| Democratic hold | | | | |

== 4th congressional district ==
Incumbent Democratic Congressman Joseph R. Bryson of the 4th congressional district, in office since 1939, was unopposed in his bid for re-election.

=== General election results ===
South Carolina's 4th congressional district election results, 1942
| Party | Candidate | Votes | % | ±% |
|---|---|---|---|---|
| Democratic | Joseph R. Bryson (incumbent) | 4,228 | 100.0 | +2.7 |
| Majority | | 4,228 | 100.0 | +5.4 |
| Turnout | | 4,228 | | |
| Democratic hold | | | | |

== 5th congressional district ==
Incumbent Democratic Congressman James P. Richards of the 5th congressional district, in office since 1933, defeated G.F. Patton in the Democratic primary and was unopposed in the general election.

=== Democratic primary ===
Democratic primary
| Candidate | Votes | % |
|---|---|---|
| James P. Richards | 24,519 | 72.4 |
| G.F. Patton | 9,337 | 27.6 |

=== General election results ===
South Carolina's 5th congressional district election results, 1942
| Party | Candidate | Votes | % | ±% |
|---|---|---|---|---|
| Democratic | James P. Richards (incumbent) | 3,122 | 100.0 | +0.8 |
| Majority | | 3,122 | 100.0 | +1.6 |
| Turnout | | 3,122 | | |
| Democratic hold | | | | |

== 6th congressional district ==
Incumbent Democratic Congressman John L. McMillan of the 6th congressional district, in office since 1939, won the Democratic primary and was unopposed in the general election.

=== Democratic primary ===
Democratic primary
| Candidate | Votes | % |
|---|---|---|
| John L. McMillan | 29,629 | 67.8 |
| C.T. McDonald | 11,495 | 26.3 |
| Fred W. Willis | 2,580 | 5.9 |

=== General election results ===
South Carolina's 6th congressional district election results, 1942
| Party | Candidate | Votes | % | ±% |
|---|---|---|---|---|
| Democratic | John L. McMillan (incumbent) | 2,905 | 100.0 | +1.0 |
| Majority | | 2,905 | 100.0 | +2.0 |
| Turnout | | 2,905 | | |
| Democratic hold | | | | |

== See also ==
- 1942 United States House of Representatives elections
- 1942 United States Senate election in South Carolina
- 1942 South Carolina gubernatorial election
- South Carolina's congressional districts
