= Robert Gilliam Jr. =

American lawyer and politician (1881–1955)

Member of the Virginia Senate from the 8th district
- In office January 10, 1928 – January 8, 1936
- Preceded by: Morton G. Goode
- Succeeded by: Benjamin Muse

Member of the Virginia House of Delegates from the Petersburg district
- In office January 9, 1918 – January 14, 1920
- Preceded by: Robert W. Price
- Succeeded by: Samuel D. Rodgers
- In office January 10, 1912 – January 14, 1914
- Preceded by: Samuel W. Zimmer
- Succeeded by: Robert W. Price

Personal details
- Born: October 6, 1881 Petersburg, Virginia, U.S.
- Died: February 3, 1955 (aged 73) Richmond, Virginia, U.S.
- Resting place: Blandford Cemetery
- Party: Democratic
- Education: Richmond College (LLB)
- Occupation: Lawyer; politician

Robert Gilliam Jr. (October 6, 1881 – February 3, 1955) was an American lawyer and Democratic Party politician, who served as a member of the Virginia House of Delegates and Virginia Senate, where he represented his native Petersburg, Virginia. His father, Robert Gilliam Sr., served as mayor of Petersburg from 1916 to 1920.
