= Cleland Kinloch and Burnet R. Maybank Huger House =

Historic house in South Carolina, United States

- U.S. National Register of Historic Places
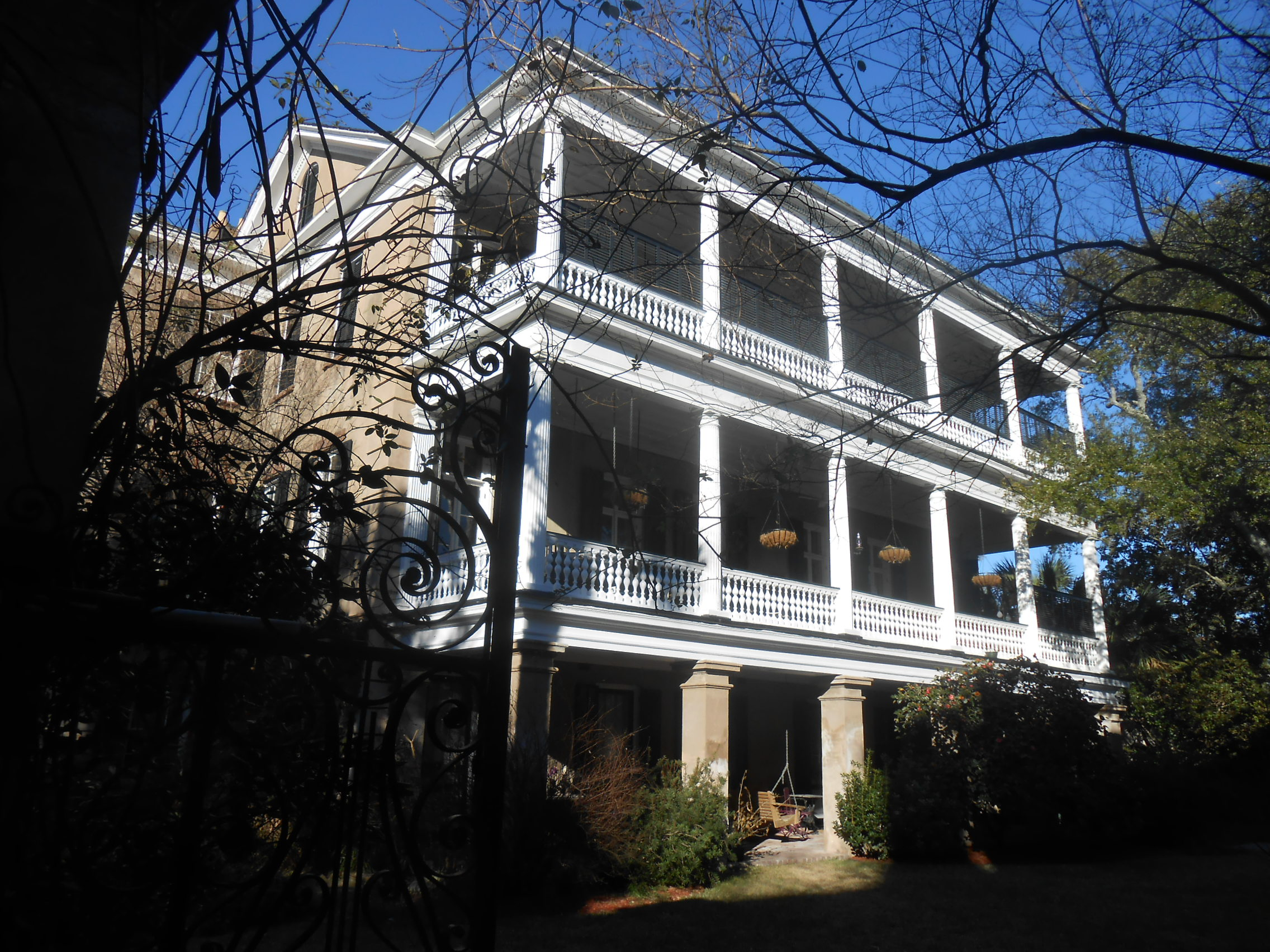

- Location within South Carolina Location within the United States
- Location: 8 Legare St., Charleston, South Carolina
- Coordinates: 32°46′20″N 79°56′2″W
- Built: 1857
- Architectural style: Italianate
- NRHP reference No.: 15000705
- Added to NRHP: October 5, 2015

The Cleland Kinloch and Burnet R. Maybank Huger House is a house in Charleston, South Carolina which is listed on the National Register of Historic Places.

The property upon which 8 Legare Street is built was originally the rear portion of the Miles Brewton House at 27 King Street. When Miles Brewton died in 1791, the recipients of his house conveyed it to William Alston who left it to his own daughter, Mary Alston (later Mary Alston Pringle). When Mary Alston Pringle's daughter married Cleland H. Huger, the Legare Street half of the property was pared off and used for the couple's house.

The house was built in 1857, likely by contractor Patrick O'Donnell, in the Italianate style. In the 20th century, it was home to Charleston Mayor Burnet Rhett Maybank who later became South Carolina Governor, before serving in the United States Senate.
