= Morton G. Goode =

American politician

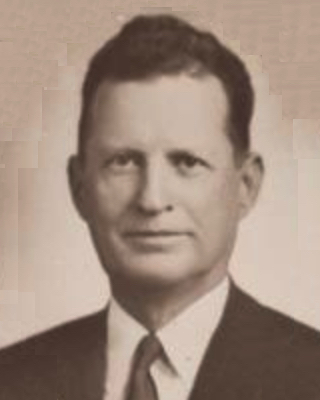

President pro tempore of the Virginia Senate
- In office January 11, 1950 – January 8, 1952
- Preceded by: Robert O. Norris Jr.
- Succeeded by: Robert C. Vaden

Member of the Virginia Senate
- In office December 14, 1936 – January 8, 1952
- Preceded by: Benjamin Muse
- Succeeded by: Benjamin L. Campbell
- Constituency: 8th district
- In office January 11, 1922 – January 10, 1928
- Preceded by: Patrick H. Drewry
- Succeeded by: Robert Gilliam Jr.
- Constituency: 29th district (1922‍–‍1924); 8th district (1924‍–‍1928)

Commonwealth's Attorney for Dinwiddie County
- In office January 1, 1912 – December 31, 1921
- Preceded by: Branch J. Epes
- Succeeded by: W. P. Sterne

Personal details
- Born: Morton Graham Goode; June 29, 1886 Skipwith, Virginia, U.S.
- Died: December 12, 1959 (aged 73) Dinwiddie, Virginia, U.S.
- Party: Democratic
- Spouse: Lucy Barnes Homes
- Education: Fredericksburg College; University of Virginia

Morton Graham Goode (June 29, 1886 – December 12, 1959) was a Virginia lawyer and Democratic member of the Senate of Virginia. Allied with the Byrd Organization, Goode represented a district centered around Petersburg part time for more than two decades. During his last term before retiring and in the absence of Virginia's Lieutenant Governors, Goode led the Virginia senate as its President pro tempore.

== Early and family life ==
Born in 1886 near Skipwith in Mecklenburg County to the former Bessie Morton (1856–1890), third of four wives of CSA Col. J. Thomas Goode (1835–1916, a VMI graduate who had accompanied General Robert E. Lee to the surrender at Appomattox Court House and later served in the Virginia legislature), Morton Goode's ancestors were among the First Families of Virginia. He had an older brother, John Thomas Goode Jr., a younger sister (Nannie) and at least two elder and married half-sisters. His brother and sister lived with their father and his fourth wife Ida Rosalie Jones Goode and her sister in 1910. Morton Goode was educated in the local (segregated) public schools of Mecklenburg and Prince Edward counties, then at Fredericksburg College and finally at the University of Virginia Law School.

Morton Goodle married Lucy Barnes Homes before his father's death, and lived at "Inglewood" (a historic house also known as "Hamilton Arms" or "Oakland"), near the Dinwiddie County Courthouse and named after the Goode ancestral home in England as well as the Mecklenburg County home of his lawyer-politician grandfather William O. Goode. They had daughters Lucy (b. 1913), Bessie (b. 1915), Sarah (b. 1923) and Caroline (b. 1926), and the same two African Americans lived as servants in their home in 1930 and 1940. His daughter Sarah married state delegate Kossen Gregory.

== Career ==
Admitted to the Virginia bar in 1910, and elected as the Commonwealth's attorney (prosecutor) for Dinwiddie County, Goode served in that position until 1921. He was active with the Virginia bar and in his Cavalry Episcopal Church, and would chair the State Hospital Board (Central State Hospital being Dinwiddie County's largest employer), and become a director of Southside Virginia Inc. as well as remained active in the local Red Cross, Masons (past master of Dinwiddie Lodge 36), Shriners and Ruritan organizations and Phi Gamma Delta fraternity.

Active in the local Democratic Party, Goode became aligned with the Byrd Organization. In late 1921, Goode won election to the Virginia senate, replacing fellow lawyer and Democrat Patrick H. Drewry, who had been elected to Congress. The district then consisted of Dinwiddie County and the city of Petersburg, and was initially numbered as the 29th senatorial district but renumbered as the 8th senatorial district for the Assembly of 1924. Fellow lawyer and Episcopalian Robert Gilliam Jr. replaced Goode in the state senate during the Assembly of 1928 and continued in office until 1936, when newspaperman Benjamin Muse replaced him, only to resign upon switching allegiances to the Republican Party. When Muse ran for election for his old seat as an independent, he lost to Goode, who thereafter continually won re-election. As state senator, Goode in 1926 helped organize the Confederate Memorial Association of Carson, which restored and continued to maintain a graveyard associated with Tabernacle Methodist Church and had Confederate dead. During the Great Depression, Goode worked to bring electricity and phone service to rural Dinwiddie county, and in December 1939, Robert Cabaniss placed the first telephone call from Petersburg to senator Goode at the Dinwiddie county seat. Goode was a presidential elector in 1924 and a delegate to the Democratic National Convention in 1936.

== Death and legacy ==
Goode retired from the Virginia senate in 1951, and continued to practice law as the Massive Resistance crisis over school desegregation continued, with Petersburg and Dinwiddie and Mecklenburg County as some of its hotspots. He died of a heart condition on December 12, 1959, survived by his wife and daughters, and was buried in the family plot at the St. James Episcopal Church cemetery in Mecklenburg County, Virginia.
