= 1941 Virginia gubernatorial election =

- November 4, 1941
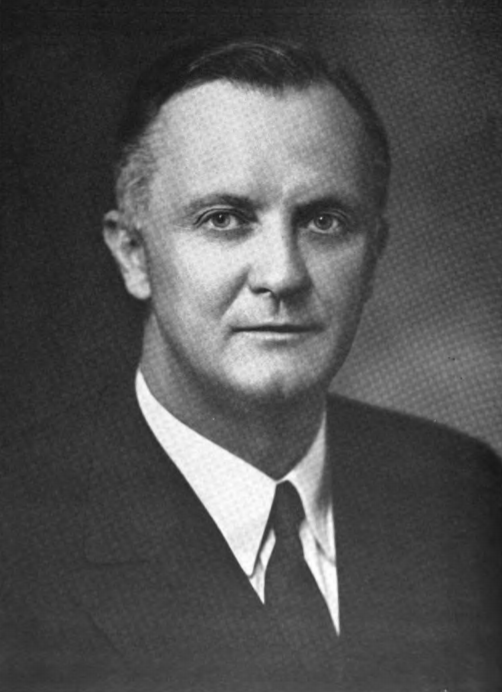

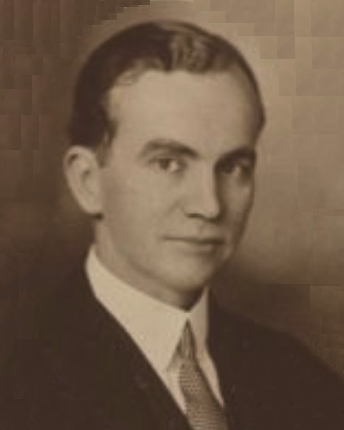
Nominee	Colgate Darden	Benjamin Muse
Party	Democratic	Republican
Popular vote	98,680	21,896
Percentage	80.58%	17.88%
- County and independent city results Darden: 50–60% 60–70% 70–80% 80–90% >90% Muse: 50–60% 60–70%
Governor before election
James H. Price
Democratic
Elected Governor
Colgate Darden
Democratic

In the 1941 Virginia gubernatorial election, incumbent Governor James H. Price, a Democrat, was unable to seek re-election due to term limits. U.S. Representative Colgate Darden was nominated by the Democratic Party to run against Republican former Virginia State Senator Benjamin Muse.

== Background ==
For the previous four decades Virginia had almost completely disenfranchised its black and poor white populations through the use of a cumulative poll tax and literacy tests. So restricted was suffrage that it has been calculated that a third of Virginia's electorate during the first half of the twentieth century comprised state employees and officeholders. This limited electorate allowed Virginian politics to be controlled for four decades by the Byrd Organization, as progressive "antiorganization" factions were rendered impotent by the inability of almost all their potential electorate to vote. Historical fusion with the "Readjuster" Democrats, defection of substantial proportions of the Northeast-aligned white electorate of the Shenandoah Valley and Southwest Virginia over free silver, and an early move towards a "lily white" Jim Crow party meant Republicans retained a small but permanent number of legislative seats and local offices in the western part of the state. Nevertheless, in gubernatorial elections during this period the Republican vote was mostly in the nature of a protest, and in most elections between 1925 and 1949 turnout was higher in the Democratic primary than the general election.

=== Reconsolidation of Organization control ===
The preceding gubernatorial election, for the only time in the Byrd machine's history, had seen it defeated in the primaries (Note: Price was sufficiently popular among all sections of Virginia's extremely limited electorate that the Byrd machine did not run its own candidate against it.) by the relatively liberal Price. However, continuing conservative control of the state legislature and the complete failure of FDR's attempt to deny conservative Senators Byrd and Carter Glass federal patronage, meant that Price could not deliver significant reforms. This was seen in Roosevelt's antiorganization nomination to the Western District federal court, Floyd H. Roberts being defeated 9–72, and that Virginia's electorate is known to have been overwhelmingly opposed to Roberts. FDR also failed to have an antiorganization man installed as Attorney for that same district court, whilst organization leader Colgate Darden recaptured the Second Congressional District from New Dealer Norman R. Hamilton.

By the 1940 Democratic State Convention, the liberals from three years back had been completely routed, and even such old New Dealers as John W. Flannagan Jr. were supporting Byrd. No strong opposition candidate could be found by Martin Hutchinson, and Darden's two primary opponents were state senators not allied with either party faction.

Darden would win extremely easily in both the primary and the general election, with the ordinarily extremely low turnout being further reduced by the absence of many voters serving in World War II.

== Democratic nomination ==
=== Candidates ===
- Colgate Darden, U.S. Representative from Norfolk
- Vivian L. Page, State Senator from Norfolk
- Hudson Cary, State Senator from Henrico County

1941 Virginia Democratic gubernatorial primary
Party	Candidate	Votes	%	±%
Democratic	Colgate W. Darden, Jr.	105,655	76.58%	
Democratic	Vivian L. Page	19,526	14.15%	
Democratic	Hudson Cary	12,793	9.27%	
Majority		86,129	62.43%	
Turnout		137,974	4.60%	
Democratic hold		Swing		

== General election ==
=== Candidates ===
- Colgate Darden, U.S. Representative from Norfolk (Democratic)
- Benjamin Muse, former Democratic State Senator from Petersburg (Republican)
- Alice Burke, state party secretary from Richmond (Communist)
- Hilliard Bernstein, former state party secretary from Richmond (Socialist)

=== Results ===
1941 Virginia gubernatorial election
Party	Candidate	Votes	%	±%
Democratic	Colgate Darden	98,680	80.58%	−2.20%
Republican	Benjamin Muse	21,896	17.88%	+2.10%
Communist	Alice Burke	1,096	0.89%	+0.11%
Socialist	Hilliard Bernstein	787	0.64%	+0.64%
Majority		76,784	62.70%	−4.30%
Turnout		122,459	4.09%	
Democratic hold		Swing		

==== Results by county or independent city ====
1941 Virginia gubernatorial election by county or independent city
	Colgate W. Darden Jr. Democratic		Benjamin Muse Republican		Alice Burke Communist		Hilliard E. Bernstein Socialist		Margin		Total votes cast
	#	%	#	%	#	%	#	%	#	%	Total votes cast
Accomack County	769	94.70%	36	4.43%	5	0.62%	2	0.25%	733	90.27%	812
Albemarle County	614	90.56%	59	8.70%	3	0.44%	2	0.29%	555	81.86%	678
Alleghany County	646	58.20%	452	40.72%	7	0.63%	5	0.45%	194	17.48%	1,110
Amelia County	214	82.95%	43	16.67%	1	0.39%	0	0.00%	171	66.28%	258
Amherst County	794	93.74%	31	3.66%	17	2.01%	5	0.59%	763	90.08%	847
Appomattox County	605	95.58%	26	4.11%	1	0.16%	1	0.16%	579	91.47%	633
Arlington County	2,302	82.27%	451	16.12%	25	0.89%	20	0.71%	1,851	66.15%	2,798
Augusta County	1,080	81.20%	242	18.20%	4	0.30%	4	0.30%	838	63.01%	1,330
Bath County	280	62.08%	163	36.14%	3	0.67%	5	1.11%	117	25.94%	451
Bedford County	795	85.85%	127	13.71%	4	0.43%	0	0.00%	668	72.14%	926
Bland County	433	59.64%	283	38.98%	4	0.55%	6	0.83%	150	20.66%	726
Botetourt County	779	73.77%	268	25.38%	8	0.76%	1	0.09%	511	48.39%	1,056
Brunswick County	508	97.69%	11	2.12%	1	0.19%	0	0.00%	497	95.58%	520
Buchanan County	1,482	75.27%	420	21.33%	33	1.68%	34	1.73%	1,062	53.94%	1,969
Buckingham County	411	91.33%	38	8.44%	0	0.00%	1	0.22%	373	82.89%	450
Campbell County	458	94.24%	19	3.91%	8	1.65%	1	0.21%	439	90.33%	486
Caroline County	299	91.16%	25	7.62%	1	0.30%	3	0.91%	274	83.54%	328
Carroll County	705	46.72%	762	50.50%	23	1.52%	19	1.26%	-57	-3.78%	1,509
Charles City County	83	92.22%	4	4.44%	3	3.33%	0	0.00%	79	87.78%	90
Charlotte County	639	97.41%	12	1.83%	4	0.61%	1	0.15%	627	95.58%	656
Chesterfield County	590	84.89%	103	14.82%	2	0.29%	0	0.00%	487	70.07%	695
Clarke County	248	92.54%	18	6.72%	0	0.00%	2	0.75%	230	85.82%	268
Craig County	224	74.42%	75	24.92%	1	0.33%	1	0.33%	149	49.50%	301
Culpeper County	412	92.38%	31	6.95%	2	0.45%	1	0.22%	381	85.43%	446
Cumberland County	194	90.65%	19	8.88%	1	0.47%	0	0.00%	175	81.78%	214
Dickenson County	1,082	70.17%	429	27.82%	14	0.91%	17	1.10%	653	42.35%	1,542
Dinwiddie County	491	90.93%	49	9.07%	0	0.00%	0	0.00%	442	81.85%	540
Elizabeth City County	356	90.36%	33	8.38%	2	0.51%	3	0.76%	323	81.98%	394
Essex County	104	90.43%	9	7.83%	1	0.87%	1	0.87%	95	82.61%	115
Fairfax County	2,298	80.74%	470	16.51%	49	1.72%	29	1.02%	1,828	64.23%	2,846
Fauquier County	651	90.04%	68	9.41%	3	0.41%	1	0.14%	583	80.64%	723
Floyd County	234	34.06%	446	64.92%	2	0.29%	5	0.73%	-212	-30.86%	687
Fluvanna County	253	93.36%	16	5.90%	2	0.74%	0	0.00%	237	87.45%	271
Franklin County	889	83.08%	176	16.45%	4	0.37%	1	0.09%	713	66.64%	1,070
Frederick County	380	78.03%	106	21.77%	1	0.21%	0	0.00%	274	56.26%	487
Giles County	924	76.43%	265	21.92%	12	0.99%	8	0.66%	659	54.51%	1,209
Gloucester County	389	91.10%	35	8.20%	2	0.47%	1	0.23%	354	82.90%	427
Goochland County	323	92.29%	17	4.86%	6	1.71%	4	1.14%	306	87.43%	350
Grayson County	2,042	45.67%	2,379	53.21%	26	0.58%	24	0.54%	-337	-7.54%	4,471
Greene County	127	82.47%	23	14.94%	2	1.30%	2	1.30%	104	67.53%	154
Greensville County	280	93.96%	17	5.70%	1	0.34%	0	0.00%	263	88.26%	298
Halifax County	1,388	98.02%	14	0.99%	13	0.92%	1	0.07%	1,374	97.03%	1,416
Hanover County	696	84.67%	88	10.71%	24	2.92%	14	1.70%	608	73.97%	822
Henrico County	386	77.82%	98	19.76%	3	0.60%	9	1.81%	288	58.06%	496
Henry County	385	91.67%	30	7.14%	3	0.71%	2	0.48%	355	84.52%	420
Highland County	233	59.90%	150	38.56%	5	1.29%	1	0.26%	83	21.34%	389
Isle of Wight County	515	96.62%	17	3.19%	1	0.19%	0	0.00%	498	93.43%	533
James City County	91	91.00%	9	9.00%	0	0.00%	0	0.00%	82	82.00%	100
King and Queen County	123	90.44%	8	5.88%	3	2.21%	2	1.47%	115	84.56%	136
King George County	132	85.71%	16	10.39%	4	2.60%	2	1.30%	116	75.32%	154
King William County	231	95.45%	11	4.55%	0	0.00%	0	0.00%	220	90.91%	242
Lancaster County	256	87.97%	33	11.34%	0	0.00%	2	0.69%	223	76.63%	291
Lee County	2,331	81.16%	407	14.17%	81	2.82%	53	1.85%	1,924	66.99%	2,872
Loudoun County	720	92.78%	54	6.96%	2	0.26%	0	0.00%	666	85.82%	776
Louisa County	966	86.40%	125	11.18%	15	1.34%	12	1.07%	841	75.22%	1,118
Lunenburg County	316	96.34%	11	3.35%	1	0.30%	0	0.00%	305	92.99%	328
Madison County	229	74.59%	72	23.45%	4	1.30%	2	0.65%	157	51.14%	307
Mathews County	341	94.46%	19	5.26%	0	0.00%	1	0.28%	322	89.20%	361
Mecklenburg County	521	94.04%	28	5.05%	5	0.90%	0	0.00%	493	88.99%	554
Middlesex County	205	97.62%	5	2.38%	0	0.00%	0	0.00%	200	95.24%	210
Montgomery County	810	73.04%	288	25.97%	5	0.45%	6	0.54%	522	47.07%	1,109
Nansemond County	426	97.93%	9	2.07%	0	0.00%	0	0.00%	417	95.86%	435
Nelson County	1,077	91.66%	70	5.96%	21	1.79%	7	0.60%	1,007	85.70%	1,175
New Kent County	105	91.30%	9	7.83%	1	0.87%	0	0.00%	96	83.48%	115
Norfolk County	1,366	97.85%	24	1.72%	2	0.14%	4	0.29%	1,342	96.13%	1,396
Northampton County	407	97.14%	12	2.86%	0	0.00%	0	0.00%	395	94.27%	419
Northumberland County	221	90.95%	18	7.41%	3	1.23%	1	0.41%	203	83.54%	243
Nottoway County	326	90.30%	33	9.14%	2	0.55%	0	0.00%	293	81.16%	361
Orange County	422	92.95%	24	5.29%	1	0.22%	7	1.54%	398	87.67%	454
Page County	987	77.53%	277	21.76%	3	0.24%	6	0.47%	710	55.77%	1,273
Patrick County	788	93.25%	47	5.56%	7	0.83%	3	0.36%	741	87.69%	845
Pittsylvania County	1,138	91.85%	80	6.46%	14	1.13%	7	0.56%	1,058	85.39%	1,239
Powhatan County	228	91.94%	18	7.26%	2	0.81%	0	0.00%	210	84.68%	248
Prince Edward County	400	91.12%	34	7.74%	2	0.46%	3	0.68%	366	83.37%	439
Prince George County	164	82.00%	33	16.50%	2	1.00%	1	0.50%	131	65.50%	200
Prince William County	362	90.27%	34	8.48%	4	1.00%	1	0.25%	328	81.80%	401
Princess Anne County	838	97.56%	21	2.44%	0	0.00%	0	0.00%	817	95.11%	859
Pulaski County	1,037	87.07%	145	12.17%	4	0.34%	5	0.42%	892	74.90%	1,191
Rappahannock County	198	88.79%	23	10.31%	0	0.00%	2	0.90%	175	78.48%	223
Richmond County	182	93.81%	11	5.67%	1	0.52%	0	0.00%	171	88.14%	194
Roanoke County	1,273	67.32%	592	31.31%	18	0.95%	8	0.42%	681	36.01%	1,891
Rockbridge County	778	82.94%	155	16.52%	3	0.32%	2	0.21%	623	66.42%	938
Rockingham County	1,847	59.54%	1,168	37.65%	29	0.93%	58	1.87%	679	21.89%	3,102
Russell County	2,211	72.33%	780	25.52%	35	1.14%	31	1.01%	1,431	46.81%	3,057
Scott County	1,423	53.64%	1,147	43.23%	50	1.88%	33	1.24%	276	10.40%	2,653
Shenandoah County	1,247	47.31%	1,376	52.20%	5	0.19%	8	0.30%	-129	-4.89%	2,636
Smyth County	1,620	61.74%	959	36.55%	27	1.03%	18	0.69%	661	25.19%	2,624
Southampton County	782	98.36%	13	1.64%	0	0.00%	0	0.00%	769	96.73%	795
Spotsylvania County	255	91.40%	20	7.17%	1	0.36%	3	1.08%	235	84.23%	279
Stafford County	185	78.06%	49	20.68%	2	0.84%	1	0.42%	136	57.38%	237
Surry County	241	93.77%	15	5.84%	1	0.39%	0	0.00%	226	87.94%	257
Sussex County	419	95.88%	18	4.12%	0	0.00%	0	0.00%	401	91.76%	437
Tazewell County	1,106	72.33%	375	24.53%	18	1.18%	30	1.96%	731	47.81%	1,529
Warren County	638	93.69%	41	6.02%	1	0.15%	1	0.15%	597	87.67%	681
Warwick County	115	87.79%	16	12.21%	0	0.00%	0	0.00%	99	75.57%	131
Washington County	1,030	72.74%	356	25.14%	18	1.27%	12	0.85%	674	47.60%	1,416
Westmoreland County	304	91.29%	27	8.11%	2	0.60%	0	0.00%	277	83.18%	333
Wise County	3,145	89.83%	334	9.54%	12	0.34%	10	0.29%	2,811	80.29%	3,501
Wythe County	749	68.21%	339	30.87%	6	0.55%	4	0.36%	410	37.34%	1,098
York County	203	93.12%	11	5.05%	3	1.38%	1	0.46%	192	88.07%	218
Alexandria City	539	90.44%	47	7.89%	6	1.01%	4	0.67%	492	82.55%	596
Bristol City	1,087	93.30%	69	5.92%	6	0.52%	3	0.26%	1,018	87.38%	1,165
Buena Vista City	340	82.93%	65	15.85%	4	0.98%	1	0.24%	275	67.07%	410
Charlottesville City	498	91.38%	44	8.07%	3	0.55%	0	0.00%	454	83.30%	545
Clifton Forge City	676	78.06%	169	19.52%	11	1.27%	10	1.15%	507	58.55%	866
Danville City	640	93.16%	40	5.82%	6	0.87%	1	0.15%	600	87.34%	687
Fredericksburg City	974	91.71%	63	5.93%	20	1.88%	5	0.47%	911	85.78%	1,062
Hampton City	243	95.67%	9	3.54%	1	0.39%	1	0.39%	234	92.13%	254
Harrisonburg City	1,144	76.32%	332	22.15%	11	0.73%	12	0.80%	812	54.17%	1,499
Hopewell City	904	77.86%	216	18.60%	30	2.58%	11	0.95%	688	59.26%	1,161
Lynchburg City	828	88.56%	95	10.16%	5	0.53%	7	0.75%	733	78.40%	935
Martinsville City	821	86.60%	85	8.97%	27	2.85%	15	1.58%	736	77.64%	948
Newport News City	556	86.47%	73	11.35%	9	1.40%	5	0.78%	483	75.12%	643
Norfolk City	4,005	96.60%	118	2.85%	16	0.39%	7	0.17%	3,887	93.75%	4,146
Petersburg City	532	81.97%	113	17.41%	1	0.15%	3	0.46%	419	64.56%	649
Portsmouth City	1,465	93.79%	78	4.99%	10	0.64%	9	0.58%	1,387	88.80%	1,562
Radford City	676	74.70%	216	23.87%	5	0.55%	8	0.88%	460	50.83%	905
Richmond City	11,715	92.65%	724	5.73%	131	1.04%	75	0.59%	10,991	86.92%	12,645
Roanoke City	1,964	71.97%	713	26.13%	36	1.32%	16	0.59%	1,251	45.84%	2,729
South Norfolk City	305	95.31%	9	2.81%	1	0.31%	5	1.56%	296	92.50%	320
Staunton City	480	86.64%	71	12.82%	0	0.00%	3	0.54%	409	73.83%	554
Suffolk City	379	98.19%	6	1.55%	0	0.00%	1	0.26%	373	96.63%	386
Williamsburg City	96	91.43%	8	7.62%	0	0.00%	1	0.95%	88	83.81%	105
Winchester City	308	79.18%	81	20.82%	0	0.00%	0	0.00%	227	58.35%	389
Totals	98,680	80.58%	21,896	17.88%	1,096	0.89%	787	0.64%	76,784	62.70%	122,459

Counties and independent cities that flipped from Democratic to Republican

- Floyd
- Shenadoah
