= 1941 Virginia lieutenant gubernatorial election =

- November 4, 1941
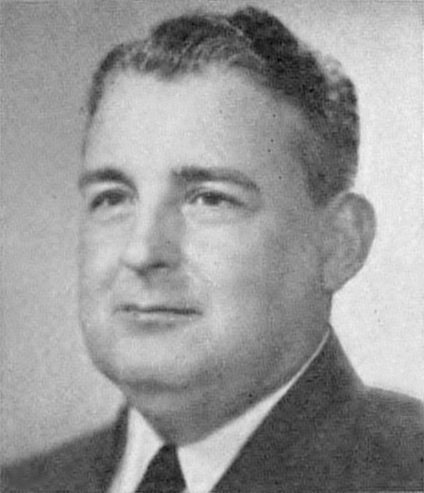

Nominee	William M. Tuck	I. C. Wagner
Party	Democratic	Republican
Popular vote	95,496	20,584
Percentage	80.23%	17.29%
- County and independent city results Tuck: 50–60% 60–70% 70–80% 80–90% 90–100% Reynolds: 40–50% 50–60% 60–70% No Data/Vote
Lieutenant Governor before election
Saxon W. Holt
Democratic
Elected Lieutenant Governor
William M. Tuck
Democratic

The 1941 Virginia lieutenant gubernatorial election was held on November 4, 1941, in order to elect the lieutenant governor of Virginia. Democratic nominee and incumbent member of the Virginia Senate William M. Tuck defeated Republican nominee I. C. Wagner and independent candidate Stephen A. Moore.

== General election ==
On election day, November 4, 1941, Democratic nominee William M. Tuck won the election by a margin of 74,912 votes against his foremost opponent Republican nominee I. C. Wagner, thereby retaining Democratic control over the office of lieutenant governor. Tuck was sworn in as the 25th lieutenant governor of Virginia on January 20, 1942.

=== Results ===
Virginia lieutenant gubernatorial election, 1941
Party	Candidate	Votes	%
Democratic	William M. Tuck	95,496	80.23
Republican	I. C. Wagner	20,584	17.29
Independent	Stephen A. Moore	2,949	2.48
Total votes		119,029	100.00
Democratic hold			
