= Colgate Darden =

American academic and politician (1897–1981)

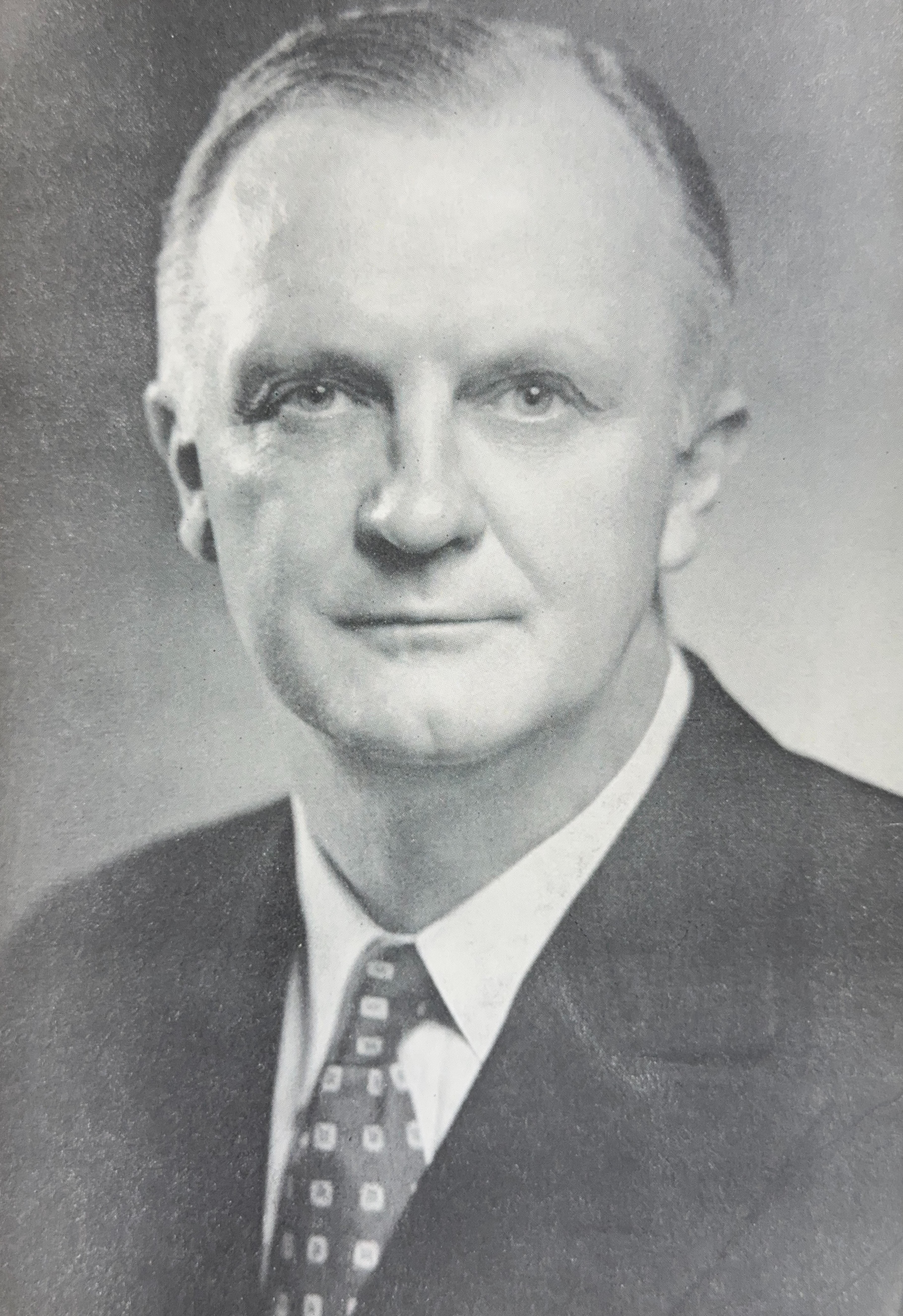
- Darden c. 1957-58

3rd President of the University of Virginia
- In office June 23, 1947 – September 1, 1959
- Preceded by: John Lloyd Newcomb
- Succeeded by: Edgar F. Shannon Jr.

54th Governor of Virginia
- In office January 21, 1942 – January 16, 1946
- Lieutenant: William M. Tuck
- Preceded by: James H. Price
- Succeeded by: William M. Tuck

Member of the U.S. House of Representatives from Virginia's 2nd district
- In office January 3, 1939 – March 1, 1941
- Preceded by: Norman R. Hamilton
- Succeeded by: Winder R. Harris
- In office January 3, 1935 – January 3, 1937
- Preceded by: District re-established Menalcus Lankford before district abolished in 1933
- Succeeded by: Norman R. Hamilton

Member of the U.S. House of Representatives from Virginia's at-large district
- In office March 4, 1933 – January 3, 1935
- Preceded by: District re-established John S. Wise before district abolished in 1885
- Succeeded by: District abolished

Member of the Virginia House of Delegates from Norfolk City
- In office January 8, 1930 – January 11, 1933
- Preceded by: Sarah Lee Fain
- Succeeded by: Richard W. Ruffin

18th Chancellor of the College of William & Mary
- In office 1946–1947
- Preceded by: John Stewart Bryan (1944)
- Succeeded by: Alvin Duke Chandler (1962)

Personal details
- Born: Colgate Whitehead Darden Jr. February 11, 1897 Southampton County, near Franklin, Virginia, U.S.
- Died: June 9, 1981 (aged 84) Norfolk, Virginia, U.S.
- Resting place: Beechwood Plantation, Southampton County, Virginia, U.S.
- Party: Democratic
- Spouse: Constance Simons Du Pont
- Children: Colgate, III, Pierre, Irene
- Education: University of Virginia (AB); Columbia University (LLB); Oxford University
- Profession: Lawyer, Politician, Educator
- Awards: French Croix de guerre

Military service
- Allegiance: United States; France
- Branch/service: French Army; United States Marine Corps
- Years of service: 1916-1919
- Rank: Lieutenant
- Battles/wars: World War I

Colgate Whitehead Darden Jr. (February 11, 1897 – June 9, 1981) was an American lawyer and Democratic politician aligned with the Byrd Organization who served as U.S. Representative from Virginia (1933–37, 1939–41), the 54th Governor of Virginia (1942–46), Chancellor of the College of William and Mary (1946–47), and the third President of the University of Virginia (1947–59). The Darden Graduate School of Business Administration of the University of Virginia is named for him.

== Early life ==
Darden was born on Marle Hill, a farm in Southampton County, Virginia, near Franklin, to Katherine Lawrence (Pretlow) Darden (1870–1936), a school teacher and Colgate Whitehead Darden (1867–1945) a farmer and businessman. His ancestors had lived in Southampton County for generations, Darden's Tavern had figured in Nat Turner's Rebellion.

Darden grew up on the family farm and attended the local public schools. He studied at the University of Virginia for two years beginning in 1914. In 1916 Darden volunteered to serve in the French Army before the United States entered World War I and became an ambulance driver with an ambulance corps of the American Field Service in France. He contracted malaria in the trenches near Verdun and returned to the United States in 1917 to recover and enlisted in the United States Marine Corps after the United States declared war on Germany. He was commissioned a lieutenant, earned his pilot's wings and became a Marine aviator during World War I. A couple of weeks before the armistice that ended the war, he was seriously injured in an airplane crash and was hospitalized for 10 months. After the war he returned to UVA, where he was a member of Phi Gamma Delta fraternity, and graduated in 1922 before going on to Columbia Law School (graduated 1923) and then Oxford University.

On December 3, 1927, Darden married Constance Simons du Pont, a daughter of Irénée du Pont, of the wealthy du Pont chemical-manufacturing family in Wilmington, Delaware.

== Career ==
Admitted to the Virginia bar, Darden began his legal practice in Norfolk, Virginia. He became active in the local Democratic party and aligned with the Byrd Organization. In 1929, Darden won his first election, becoming one of Norfolk's four (part-time) representatives to the Virginia House of Delegates. He also won re-election and served alongside Daniel Coleman, Vivian L. Page and Wilson W. Vellines from 1930 to 1933, when Darden resigned because of his election to Congress. Ralph H. Daughton and Richard W. Ruffin replaced Darden and the deceased Vellines in the special election for the vacancies.

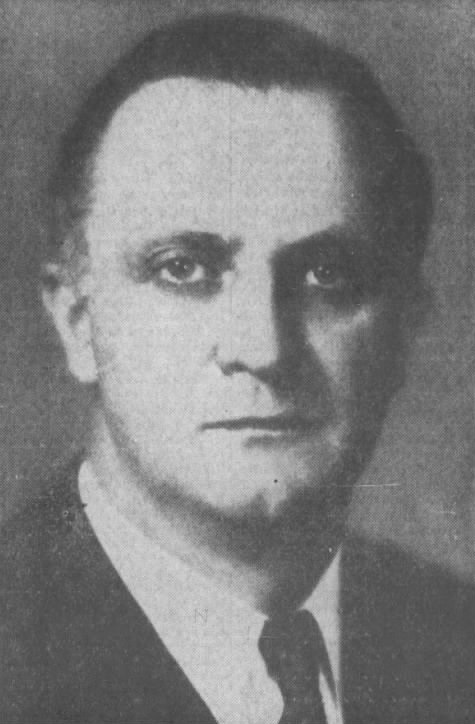
Darden in 1941

=== Congressional service ===
In 1932, Darden won election as a Democrat in an At-large election to select Virginia's U.S. Representatives to the 73rd Congress. The Byrd Organization controlling the Virginia legislature had switched from an election by congressional districts to an at-large method that year in order to unseat Republican Menalcus Lankford, who represented the 2nd district, and thus Democrats swept all Virginia's congressional seats in that election. Darden won re-election two years later, this time representing the 2nd district in the 74th Congress, and served from March 4, 1933 – January 3, 1937. Norfolk port official and Portsmouth publisher Norman R. Hamilton unseated Darden in the Democratic primary in 1936, so he did not serve in the 75th Congress, but defeated Hamilton in the next Democratic primary and thus won re-election in 1938 and 1940 to the 76th and 77th Congresses. Thus he served from January 3, 1939 – March 1, 1941, when Darden resigned to run for Governor of Virginia.

While in Congress, as a Byrd Organization loyalist, Darden supported the Dies Committee (predecessor of the House Unamerican Activities committee) and opposed federal anti-lynching legislation in 1940 (though he supported Virginia legislation concerning the same crime). Darden also supported loans to European allies as early as 1939, before the United States entered World War II.

==== Electoral history ====
- 1932; Darden was elected to Congress with the rest of the Democratic slate as an at-large member winning 8.24% of the vote in a 24-way race.
- 1934; Darden was re-elected defeating Republican Gerould M. Rumble, Socialist George Rohlsen, and Communist Herbert S. Carrington, winning 76.14% of the vote.
- 1938; Darden was re-elected defeating Independent Carl P. Spaeth, winning 87.7% of the vote.
- 1940; Darden was re-elected unopposed.

=== Governor of Virginia ===
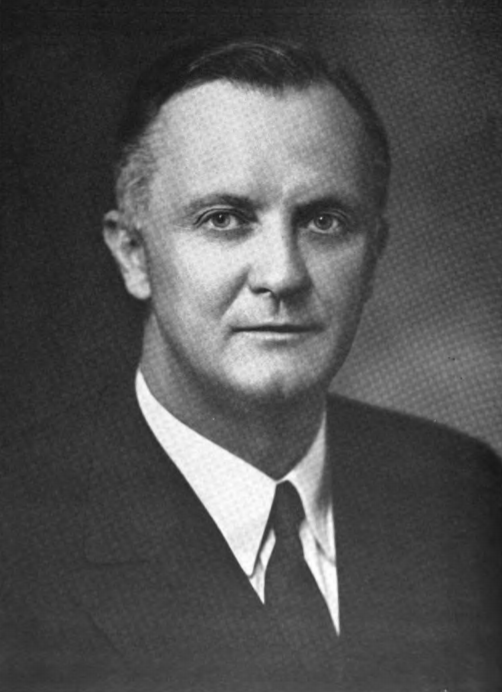
Darden as governor

Darden was elected Governor of Virginia with 80.72% of the vote, defeating Republican Benjamin Muse, Communist Alice Burke, and Socialist M. Hilliard Bernstein. Inaugurated on January 21, 1942, Darden served until January 16, 1946. As governor, Darden reorganized Virginia's civil defense during World War II, reformed Virginia's penal system, and created a pension plan for state employees and teachers. He also eliminated the state debt (a core value of the Byrd organization) and created a surplus which was allocated to vocational schools, colleges, hospitals and other public services (including electrification of all Virginia educational institutions). However, Darden's record on race relations reflected the Byrd organization's segregationist values: blacks would receive financial help to study at Meharry Medical College in Tennessee (since Virginia medical schools remained only for whites) and he called to remove legislative obstacles to blacks serving on juries. Governor Darden also refused to overturn the firing of several black educators following the 1940 federal equal pay decision in Alston v School Board of Norfolk.

=== President of the University of Virginia ===
Darden was elected president of the University of Virginia in 1947, despite public misgivings from some among the university faculty, who resented his lack of faculty experience, and some students who feared that he planned to abolish the fraternity system at the university. The latter concern had its origin in Darden's actions as Governor of Virginia, where he recommended barring students at the College of William and Mary from living in fraternity or sorority houses on the grounds that it was "undemocratic" and placed undue financial burden on parents. While Darden did not impose similar restrictions at Virginia, he did attempt to implement other measures, such as a ban on first year rushing.

While Darden favored admitting African Americans to professional and graduate schools after the Supreme Court mandated such, he otherwise shared the "separate but equal" stance of many white Southerners of the pre-Brown v. Board of Education (1954) era. In 1950 Darden advocated that public schools remain, in his words, racially "segregated," but "first-rate." In that year, following federal litigation, Gregory Swanson became the first black student admitted to the University of Virginia School of Law. Darden also testified as a witness favoring segregation in Davis v. County School Board of Prince Edward County, one of the companion cases to Brown, and Judge Albert Bryan, in the 3-judge decision upholding the unequal schools which the Supreme Court reversed, specifically cited Darden's testimony as influential. In August 1954, Darden also addressed a Ruritan gathering in Southampton and warned about the white race being only a tiny fraction of the population.

At Virginia, Darden was responsible for erection of the student union building, named Newcomb Hall for his predecessor John Lloyd Newcomb; the establishment of the Judiciary Committee (which handled student misconduct that did not rise to the level of an honor offense); the creation of the graduate school of business administration (named in his memory) and significant improvements to faculty salaries. Upon his retirement, he was presented with the Thomas Jefferson Award and the Raven Award.

President Dwight D. Eisenhower appointed Darden as a U.S. delegate to the United Nations General Assembly in 1955, as he broke with the Byrd Organization's Massive Resistance policy.

== Death ==
Darden died in 1981 at his home in Norfolk, Virginia. He was buried in the family plot with his parents. In addition to his wife, he was survived by his younger brother Joshua Pretlow Darden, who had served as Norfolk's mayor (1949–50). Darden is memorialized with a historic marker at the site of his birth.

== Personal life ==
Darden enjoyed a close friendship with Tidewater resident Barham Gary, whose sister, writer Myra Page, referred to Darden by the nickname "Clukey." His nephew (Joshua Darden) went on to be the rector at UVA, as well as head of the board. Joshua has two daughters; Audrey and Holley Darden.

== Legacy and Honors ==
In 1955, the graduate school of business administration at the University of Virginia was named for Darden.

In 1968, the Board of Visitors of Old Dominion University voted to rename its school of education the Darden School of Education after Darden, who was a strong advocate for education in Virginia during his term as governor. In 1986 the school became the Darden College of Education.

Darden Hall, a 35,000 square foot building on the campus of UVA Wise is named in honor of Darden who as president of UVA was instrumental in the founding of the college. Darden Hall houses computer and mathematics laboratories, classrooms, the Technical Assistance Center and faculty offices.

The Darden Society, the oldest and most prestigious honor society at UVA Wise, is named for Darden. Students are selected for membership on the basis of scholarly achievement and intellectual promise.

Party political offices
Preceded by James Hubert Price	Democratic nominee for Governor of Virginia; 1941	Succeeded by William M. Tuck
U.S. House of Representatives
Preceded by District re-established John S. Wise before district abolished in 1885	Member of the U.S. House of Representatives from Virginia's at-large congressional seat 1933–1935	Succeeded by District abolished
Preceded by District re-established Menalcus Lankford before district abolished in 1933	Member of the U.S. House of Representatives from Virginia's 2nd congressional district 1935–1937	Succeeded by Norman R. Hamilton
Preceded by Norman R. Hamilton	Member of the U.S. House of Representatives from Virginia's 2nd congressional district 1937–1941	Succeeded by Winder R. Harris
Political offices
Preceded by James H. Price	Governor of Virginia; 1942–1946	Succeeded by William M. Tuck
