= Benjamin Muse =

American politician (1898–1986)

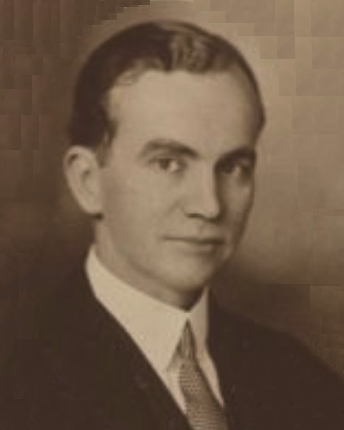

Member of the Virginia Senate from the 8th district
- In office January 8, 1936 – September 11, 1936
- Preceded by: Robert Gilliam Jr.
- Succeeded by: Morton G. Goode

Personal details
- Born: Benjamin Muse; April 17, 1898 Durham, North Carolina, U.S.
- Died: May 4, 1986 (aged 88) Reston, Virginia, U.S.
- Party: Republican
- Other political affiliations: Democratic (before 1936)
- Spouse: Beatriz de Regil
- Education: Trinity College; George Washington University

Military service
- Allegiance: United Kingdom; United States
- Branch/service: British Army; United States Army
- Years of service: 1917–1919; 1942–1944
- Rank: Lieutenant colonel
- Unit: King's Royal Rifle Corps; Adjutant General's Corps
- Battles/wars: First World War; Second World War

Benjamin Muse (April 17, 1898 – May 4, 1986) was an American lawyer, soldier, diplomat, farmer, newspaper publisher, author and politician. He briefly served as a member of the Virginia Senate (switching allegiances from the Democratic to the Republican Party and was defeated when he ran as an Independent for the Petersburg, Virginia seat; he resigned as a result of that switch). In 1941 Muse, running as the Republican candidate for Governor of Virginia, lost overwhelmingly to Democrat Colgate Darden, a member of the state's Byrd Organization. Later, Muse lived in Manassas, Virginia, from where he opposed and chronicled the Massive Resistance crisis fostered by U.S. Senator Harry F. Byrd and Richmond newspaperman James J. Kilpatrick as they fomented opposition to the United States Supreme Court decisions in Brown v. Board of Education which overturned racial segregation in public schools.

== Early and family life ==
Muse was born in Durham, North Carolina, on April 17, 1898. He was raised in Petersburg, Virginia and attended Trinity College (now Duke University). After his wartime service discussed below, Muse attended graduate school at George Washington University in Washington, D.C.

While serving in Mexico in 1925, Muse married Beatriz de Regil (1901–1983) from Merida, Mexico in the Yucatan Peninsula. Beatriz was the daughter of Katherine Baker and Pedro de Regil, the owner of a vast henequen plantation in Yucatan and was raised in Hacienda Uayalceh. They had two sons—Benjamin Muse Jr. (1927–2012) (born during his father's posting in Paris, France) and Paul Muse (of Suffolk, Virginia)--as well as daughters Katherine Furcron of Cuernavaca, Mexico, Phillipa Millard of Gainesville, Virginia and St. Augustine, Florida and Carlota Rokita of Vienna, Austria. Benjamin and Beatriz bought the Parnassus Bookstore in Yarmouth Port, Cape Cod, for Benjamin Jr., who ran it until his death, and the bookstore is maintained and run by his children. Many of the children Phillipa Millard and her husband Jim Millard, (who both attended Georgetown in Washington, DC), had become artists, photographers, painters, and educators, including educator and painter Elizabeth Harris, painter and social worker Ann Millard, photographer Mary Schmidt, and educator Peter Millard. Phillipa Millard's grandchild is the writer and multimedia artist Elena Botts who has created art surrounding Hacienda Uayalceh and family histories. Other grandchildren include musicians and illustrators.

== Military and diplomatic careers ==
As World War I began, Muse volunteered for the British Army in 1914, serving with the King's Royal Rifle Corps. The Germans captured him in 1916, holding him as a prisoner-of-war until he was released and discharged in 1919 following the armistice. Upon returning to the U.S., Muse studied in Washington D.C. until joining the State Department in 1920. He held various diplomatic posts in Europe and Latin America. The culmination of his fourteen years of service may have been his term as counselor to the U.S. delegation to the Seventh International Conference of American States in 1933, at which President Franklin D. Roosevelt and Secretary of State Cordell Hull declared the Good Neighbor policy and which led to the Montevideo Convention.

After selling shoes near Petersburg and the part-time political career discussed below, in 1939, the elder Muse enlisted in the U.S. Army as World War II began. He served in the Adjutant General Corps, assigned to Washington, D.C. until 1945, and retired with the rank of lieutenant colonel. His son and namesake enlisted in the U.S. Navy in 1944, and served in the Pacific, including patrols on the Yangtze River in China.

== Political career ==
Upon resigning from the Foreign Service and returning to the United States in 1934, Muse settled in Petersburg and began farming. His farm, Dunedin, became known for experimental farming. The following year, Muse won election as a Democrat to represent the state's 8th district. However, he switched parties nine months into his term, and resigned after heavy criticism, then ran for his former seat as an independent and lost. Muse changed parties because he came to oppose President Roosevelt's New Deal.

In 1941, Muse became the Republican Party's nominee for Governor of Virginia. He campaigned for repeal of the poll tax and other liberal reforms, and lost overwhelmingly in the general election on November 4, 1941 (winning just 17.6 percent of the votes) to Colgate Darden, who had the support of the Byrd Organization and won 80.6 percent of the votes cast. Darden later became a good friend, and later, as President of the University of Virginia, led it through the Massive Resistance crisis discussed below.

== Writer, publisher and opponent of Massive Resistance ==
During his World War II service in the U.S. Army, Muse, assigned to Washington, D.C., bought a farm in Manassas, Virginia (then a distant suburb). He founded and published a local newspaper, the Manassas Messenger, selling it in 1950 (it later became the Journal-Messenger) but continuing a related printing business until 1966.

During the 1950s and early 1960s, Muse wrote a weekly "Virginia Affairs" column for The Washington Post. It chronicled problems resulting from racial segregation and policies of the Byrd Organization. He also criticized the NAACP for pushing for rapid school desegregation, especially in Prince Edward County. Muse also wrote about Southern affairs in The Nation and The New Republic.

After both a three-judge federal panel and the Virginia Supreme Court declared most of the Stanley Plan (a package of laws designed to support Massive Resistance) unconstitutional on January 19, 1959 (birthday of Robert E. Lee and a Virginia state holiday), Muse (who considered himself a "fighting moderate" rather than a liberal) directed the Southern Leadership Project of the Southern Regional Council, an early private civil rights organization. For four years Muse toured the South urging voluntary compliance with court desegregation orders. President John F. Kennedy also appointed him to a commission to monitor racial equality in the armed forces.

Muse published his first book, Virginia's Massive Resistance in 1961, and Ten Years of Prelude (also about Massive Resistance) in 1964. He also published Tarheel Tommy Atkins (1963) about World War I. He later published The American Negro Revolution: From Nonviolence to Black Power, 1963-1967. His last book was The Twentieth Century as I Saw It (1981).

== Death and legacy ==
Retiring from both farming and publishing in 1966 (as President Lyndon B. Johnson began implementing the Civil Rights Act of 1965 and funding desegregating schools), Muse and his wife moved to the newly developed Reston, Virginia. He died at his home two decades later, and was interred at the Sacred Heart Catholic Church cemetery in Prince William County.

His papers from 1934 through 1966 are held in the Special Collections section of the library of the University of Virginia at Charlottesville.

== See also ==
Brian J. Daugherity, Keep on Keeping On: the NAACP and the Implementation of Brown v. Board of Education in Virginia (Charlottesville: University of Virginia Press, 2016)

Senate of Virginia
Preceded by Robert Gilliam Jr.	Virginia Senator for the 8th District; 1936	Succeeded by Morton G. Goode
Party political offices
Preceded by J. Powell Royall	Republican nominee for Governor of Virginia; 1941	Succeeded by S. Floyd Landreth
