= 1941 Dominican Republic Constitutional Assembly election =

Election in the Dominican Republic

Constitutional Assembly elections were held in the Dominican Republic on 16 December 1941. The role of the Assembly was to review and amend certain articles of the constitution.
