= J. Lyles Glenn Jr. =

American judge (1892–1938)

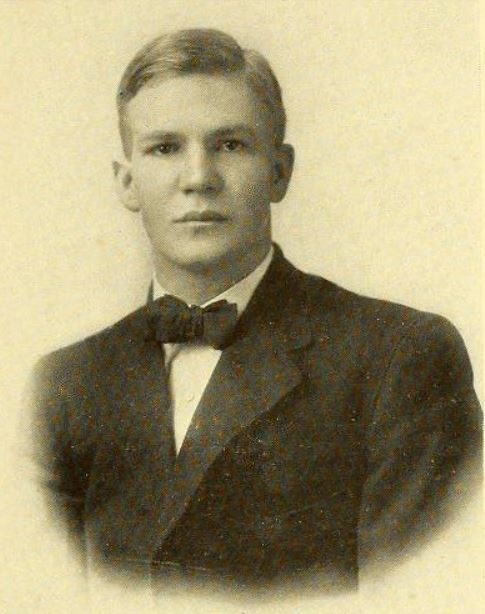
- Wofford College 1912 yearbook photo of John Lyles Glenn Jr.

Judge of the United States District Court for the Eastern District of South Carolina and United States District Court for the Western District of South Carolina
- In office April 29, 1929 – May 2, 1938
- Appointed by: Herbert Hoover
- Preceded by: Seat established by 45 Stat. 1319
- Succeeded by: Alva M. Lumpkin

Personal details
- Born: John Lyles Glenn Jr. April 2, 1892 Chester, South Carolina, U.S.
- Died: May 2, 1938 (aged 46) Chester, South Carolina, U.S.
- Education: Wofford College (AB); Oxford University (LLB)

John Lyles Glenn Jr. (April 2, 1892 – May 2, 1938) was a United States district judge of the United States District Court for the Eastern District of South Carolina and the United States District Court for the Western District of South Carolina.

== Education and career ==
Born in Chester, South Carolina, Glenn received an Artium Baccalaureus degree from Wofford College in 1912 and a Bachelor of Laws from Oxford University in 1918 before serving as a Captain in the United States Army from 1918 to 1919. He was in private practice in Chester from 1919 to 1929, serving also as a member of the South Carolina House of Representatives from 1919 to 1923 and as a solicitor and prosecuting attorney for the Sixth South Carolina Circuit from 1923 to 1929.

== Federal judicial service ==
Glenn was nominated by President Herbert Hoover on April 18, 1929, to the United States District Court for the Eastern District of South Carolina and the United States District Court for the Western District of South Carolina, to a new joint seat authorized by 45 Stat. 1319. He was confirmed by the United States Senate on April 29, 1929, and received his commission the same day. His service terminated on May 2, 1938, due to his death in Chester.

== Personal life ==
Glenn was the father of future U.S. Attorney Terrell L. Glenn Sr. Glenn and his son are the namesakes of the University of South Carolina School of Law mock trial competition. His grandson, Terrell L. Glenn Jr., became an Episcopal priest and an Anglican bishop.

== Sources ==
Legal offices
| Preceded by Seat established by 45 Stat. 1319 | Judge of the United States District Court for the Eastern District of South Carolina; Judge of the United States District Court for the Western District of South Carolina; 1929–1938 | Succeeded by Alva M. Lumpkin |
