= 1941 Guatemalan presidential election =

Jorge Ubico y Castañeda’s presidential term was extended to 15 March 1949 by a Constituent Assembly on 11 September 1941. Assumed office 15 March 1943.
