= Norman R. Hamilton =

American politician

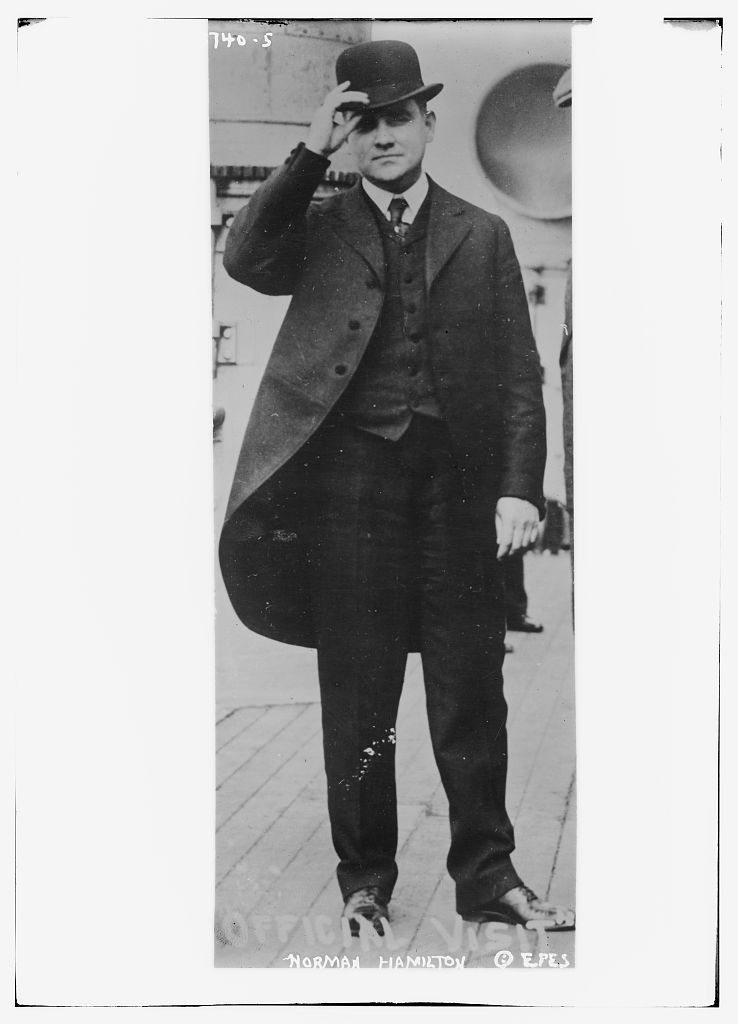

Member of the U.S. House of Representatives from Virginia's 2nd district
- In office January 3, 1937 – January 3, 1939
- Preceded by: Colgate Darden
- Succeeded by: Colgate Darden

Personal details
- Born: Norman Rond Hamilton; November 13, 1877 Portsmouth, Virginia
- Died: March 26, 1964 (aged 86) Norfolk, Virginia
- Resting place: Oak Grove Cemetery in Portsmouth, Virginia
- Party: Democratic
- Profession: journalist, civil servant

Norman Rond Hamilton (November 13, 1877 – March 26, 1964) was an American businessman and politician who served one term as a U.S. representative from Virginia from 1937 to 1939.

== Early and family life ==
Born in Portsmouth, Virginia, Hamilton attended the public and high schools.

== Career ==
Hamilton began his publishing career as a newspaper reporter in Norfolk (1895–1914). He became publisher of the Portsmouth (Virginia) Star from 1917 until it merged with the Norfolk Ledger in 1955.

=== Early political career ===
He became involved in the local Democratic Party . Hamilton became collector of customs for Virginia during the Wilson administration, and served from 1914 until 1922. Before the United States entered World War I, Hamilton became the port's neutrality enforcement officer. He then served as chairman of the Port War Board of Hampton Roads (1916–1918). Hamilton was a delegate to the Democratic National Conventions in 1924, 1928, 1932, 1952, and 1960. He also served as Trustee of Virginia State Teachers' College in 1922–1926. During the Franklin D. Roosevelt administration, Hamilton, in 1933, Hamilton was appointed as receiver at Washington, D.C., of five District of Columbia insolvent banks, a position he resigned in June 1936 to run for Congress.

=== Congress ===
Hamilton defeated incumbent (and Byrd Organization loyalist) Colgate Darden in the Democratic primary, then won election to the seat in the general election. He thus served in the Seventy-fifth Congress (January 3, 1937 – January 3, 1939). However, Darden defeated his renomination attempt in 1938, and also failed to win election in 1941 to fill a vacancy in the Seventy-seventh Congress. Executive of the Norfolk-Portsmouth Newspapers, Inc..

== Death and legacy ==
Hamilton died in Norfolk, Virginia, March 26, 1964. He was interred in Oak Grove Cemetery, Portsmouth, Virginia.

== Electoral history ==
=== 1936 ===
Hamilton was elected to the U.S. House of Representatives defeating Republican Gerould M. Rumble and Communist Alexander Wright, winning 88.68% of the vote.

== Sources ==
- United States Congress. "Norman R. Hamilton (id: H000116)". Biographical Directory of the United States Congress.

U.S. House of Representatives
Preceded by Colgate Darden	Member of the U.S. House of Representatives from Virginia's 2nd congressional district 1937–1939	Succeeded by Colgate Darden
