= Vivian L. Page =

American politician and lawyer (1894–1962)

Member of the Virginia Senate from the 2nd district
- In office January 8, 1936 – January 12, 1944
- Preceded by: John W. Eggleston
- Succeeded by: Edward L. Breeden Jr.

Member of the Virginia House of Delegates from Norfolk City
- In office January 9, 1924 – January 8, 1936
- Preceded by: Ivor A. Page Jr.

Personal details
- Born: Vivian Llewellyn Page; June 1, 1894 Norfolk, Virginia, US
- Died: June 21, 1962 (aged 68) Norfolk, Virginia, US
- Party: Democratic
- Spouse: Annie E. Miller (1893–1970)
- Children: Walter A. Page
- Education: Washington and Lee University School of Law
- Occupation: Lawyer

Vivian L. Page (June 1, 1894 – June 21, 1962) was an American politician and lawyer. He was a Democratic member of the Virginia House of Delegates 1924–1936 and the Senate of Virginia 1936–1944, representing the city of Norfolk.

== Early life, education, career ==
Page was born in Norfolk to Ivor A. Page (1864–1954), a lawyer, and his wife Addie (1863–1922). He graduated from Matthew Fontaine Maury High School in 1911. In 1916, he received a law degree from Washington and Lee University, where he was a member of Sigma Phi Epsilon. After graduation, he joined his father's law firm.

Page married Annie E. Miller (1893–1970) in 1916. They had one son, Walter A. Page, also a lawyer.

== Political career ==
Page was first elected to the House of Delegates in 1923. His older brother, Ivor A. Page, Jr., was a member at the time, but was not reelected. Another brother, Reginald J. B. Page, was a judge.

Page served six two-year terms (1924–1936) in the House of Delegates, then two four-year terms in the Senate (1936–1944).

At the end of Prohibition, Page advocated that Virginia allow liquor sales in privately owned stores. Virginia opted for a network of state-owned stores instead.

Page ran twice for Governor of Virginia, losing the Democratic primary in 1937 to Lieutenant Governor James Hubert Price and in 1941 to fellow Norfolk lawyer and former United States Representative Colgate Darden. Page received about 14% of the vote in each primary election.

== Death ==
Page died June 21, 1962.
