= 1948 United States Senate election in South Carolina =

1948 Democratic Senate primary in South Carolina
- August 10, 1948
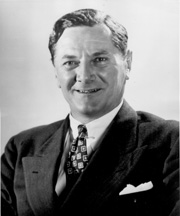

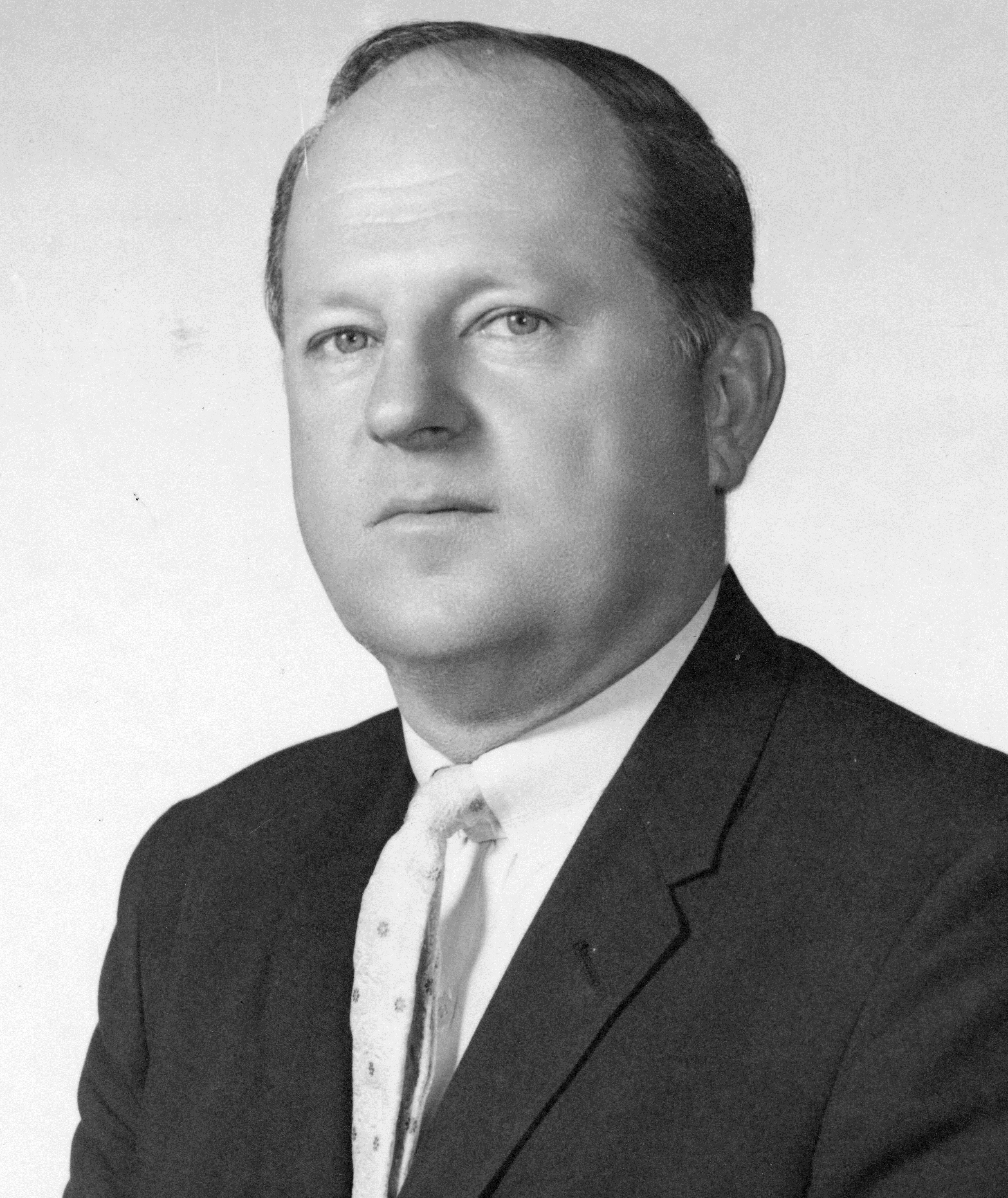
Nominee	Burnet R. Maybank	W.J. Bryan Dorn
Party	Democratic	Democratic
Popular vote	161,608	76,749
Percentage	51.63%	24.85%
Nominee	Neville Bennett	Alan Johnstone
Party	Democratic	Democratic
Popular vote	43,068	17,689
Percentage	13.48%	5.44%
- Results by county Maybank: 40–50% 50–60% 60–70% Dorn: 30–40% 40–50% 50–60% 60–70% Bennett: 80–90%
U.S. senator before election
Burnet R. Maybank
Democratic
Elected U.S. Senator
Burnet R. Maybank
Democratic

The 1948 South Carolina United States Senate election was held on November 2, 1948, to select the U.S. Senator from the state of South Carolina. Incumbent Senator Burnet R. Maybank won the Democratic primary and defeated Republican challenger J. Bates Gerald in the general election to win another six-year term.

== Democratic primary ==
=== Candidates ===
- Neville Bennett
- William Jennings Bryan Dorn, U.S. Representative from Greenwood
- Alan Johnstone
- Burnet R. Maybank, incumbent Senator since 1941
- Marcus A. Stone

=== Results ===
Senator Maybank narrowly achieved a majority of the primary vote, avoiding a potential run-off election against Dorn.

Democratic Primary
Candidate	Votes	%
Burnet R. Maybank	161,608	51.5
W.J. Bryan Dorn	76,749	24.4
Neville Bennett	43,068	13.7
Alan Johnstone	17,689	5.6
Marcus A. Stone	14,904	4.8

== General election ==
=== Campaign ===
Since the end of Reconstruction in 1877, the Democratic Party dominated the politics of South Carolina and its statewide candidates were never seriously challenged. Maybank did not campaign for the general election as there was no chance of defeat.

=== Results ===
1948 U.S. Senate election in South Carolina
Party	Candidate	Votes	%	±%
Democratic	Burnet R. Maybank (incumbent)	135,998	96.4	−3.6
Republican	J. Bates Gerald	5,008	3.6	+3.6
Majority		130,990	92.8	−7.2
Turnout		141,006		
Democratic hold				

65+% won by Maybank

== See also ==
- List of United States senators from South Carolina
- United States Senate elections, 1948 and 1949
- United States House of Representatives elections in South Carolina, 1948
