= Burnet R. Maybank =

American politician

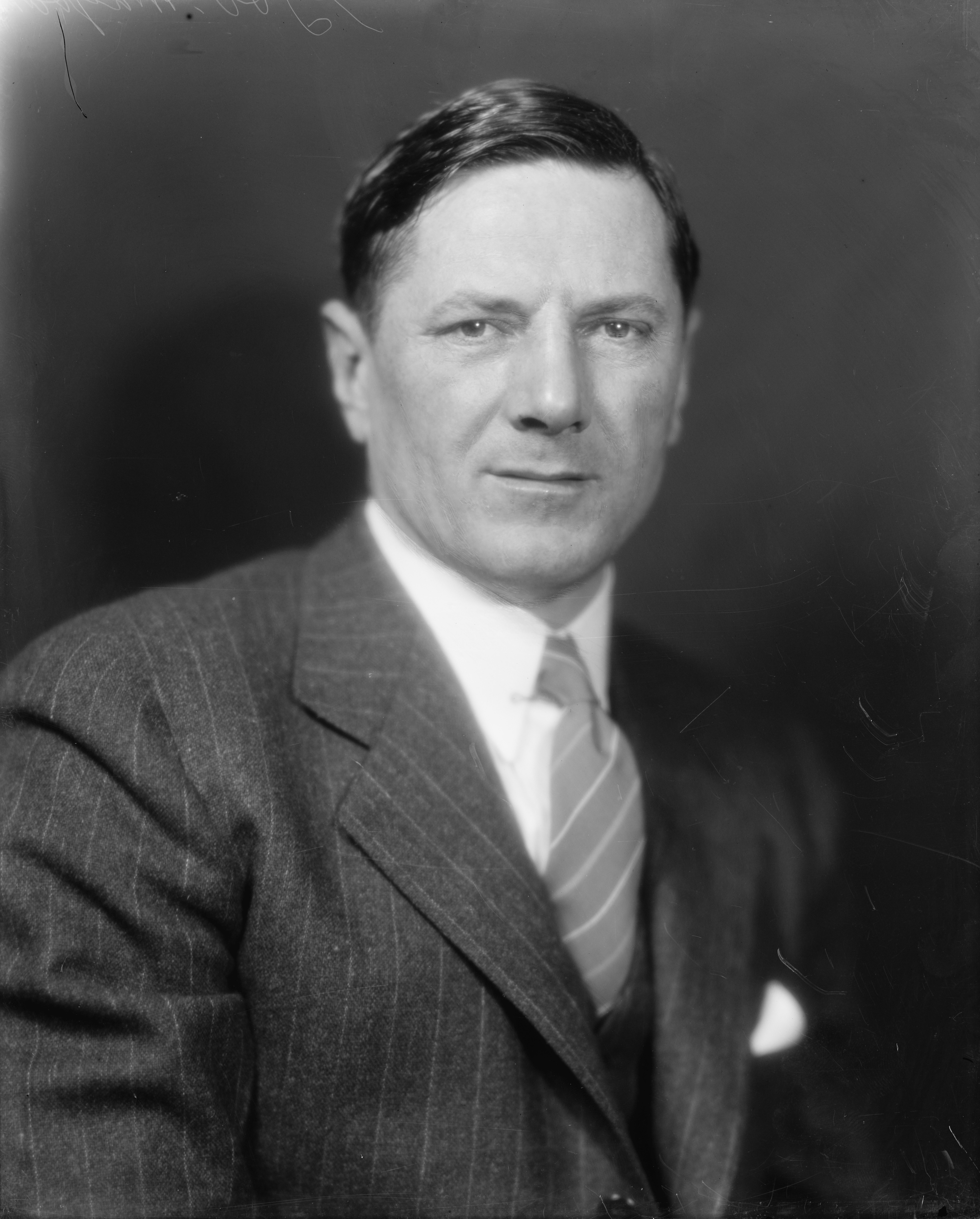

United States Senator from South Carolina
- In office November 5, 1941 – September 1, 1954
- Preceded by: Roger C. Peace
- Succeeded by: Charles E. Daniel

Chairman of the Committee on Banking and Currency
- In office January 3, 1949 – January 3, 1953
- Preceded by: Charles W. Tobey
- Succeeded by: Homer Capehart

Co-Chairman of the Joint Committee on Defense Production
- In office September 8, 1950 – January 3, 1953; Alongside Brent Spence
- Preceded by: Position established
- Succeeded by: Homer Capehart

99th Governor of South Carolina
- In office January 17, 1939 – November 4, 1941
- Lieutenant: Joseph Emile Harley
- Preceded by: Olin D. Johnston
- Succeeded by: Joseph Emile Harley

54th Mayor of Charleston
- In office December 14, 1931 – December 27, 1938
- Preceded by: Thomas Porcher Stoney
- Succeeded by: Henry Whilden Lockwood

Personal details
- Born: Burnet Rhett Maybank; March 7, 1899 Charleston, South Carolina, U.S.
- Died: September 1, 1954 (aged 55) Flat Rock, North Carolina, U.S.
- Party: Democratic
- Children: Burnet Rhett Maybank Jr. among others
- Education: College of Charleston

Military service
- Allegiance: United States
- Branch/service: United States Navy
- Battles/wars: World War I

Burnet Rhett Maybank (March 7, 1899 – September 1, 1954) was a three-term U.S. senator, the 99th governor of South Carolina, and mayor of Charleston, South Carolina. He was the first governor from Charleston since the American Civil War (1861-1865) and one of twenty people in United States history to have been elected mayor, governor, and United States senator. During his tenure in the Senate, Maybank was a powerful ally of President Franklin D. Roosevelt. His unexpected death on September 1, 1954, from a heart attack, led to Strom Thurmond being elected senator.

== Early life and family ==
Maybank was born in Charleston, South Carolina, into one of the city's most prominent and wealthy families. He was the direct descendant of five former South Carolina governors: Thomas Smith, Rawlins Lowndes, Robert Gibbes, James Moore and William Aiken, Jr. Additionally, he was a great-grandson of U.S. Senator Robert Barnwell Rhett. Maybank graduated from the Porter Military Academy (now known as Porter-Gaud) and went on to earn a degree from the College of Charleston. He served in the United States Navy during World War I.

Burnet Maybank was born to Dr. Joseph Maybank VI and Harriet Lowndes Rhett, the first of ten. He married Elizabeth deRosset Myers on June 28, 1923. They had three children: a son, Burnet, and two daughters, Elizabeth and Roberta. After the death of his first wife Maybank remarried, but the second marriage produced no children. His son, Burnet R. Maybank Jr., later held the office of lieutenant governor of South Carolina, as well as serving as a legislator in the General Assembly and as candidate for governor.

== Career ==
=== Mayor of Charleston ===
Prior to becoming interested in politics and public service, Maybank had established himself in the cotton export business from 1920 to 1938. A lifelong Democrat, Maybank entered politics for the first time in 1927, when he was elected to a four-year term as alderman in Charleston. He rose to mayor pro tempore in 1930 and was then elected mayor of Charleston in 1931, serving until 1938. As mayor, Maybank balanced the budget during the Great Depression. He refused an increase of his own salary to $6,000 from $3,600, and reduced local taxes. Maybank took advantage of federal financing under President Franklin D. Roosevelt's administration for slum clearance, construction of public housing and other infrastructure, and support for unemployment payments. He also used a Works Progress Administration (WPA) grant to restore the historic Dock Street Theatre, and other grants went to such infrastructure improvements as the city docks and a city incinerator.

During this period Maybank was also appointed as a member of the State Board of Bank Control (1932–1933) and was chairman of the South Carolina Public Service Authority (1935–1939). It supervised a state-sponsored power project on the Santee River. This project, known as the "little TVA", was built to control floods as well as provide hydroelectric power for the state. Maybank was a liberal supporter of President Roosevelt's New Deal, which funded public works and job programs. But he opposed a share of the president's labor policies. In addition, he was appointed by the governor as a member of the South Carolina State Advisory Board of the federal Public Works Administration from 1933 to 1934.

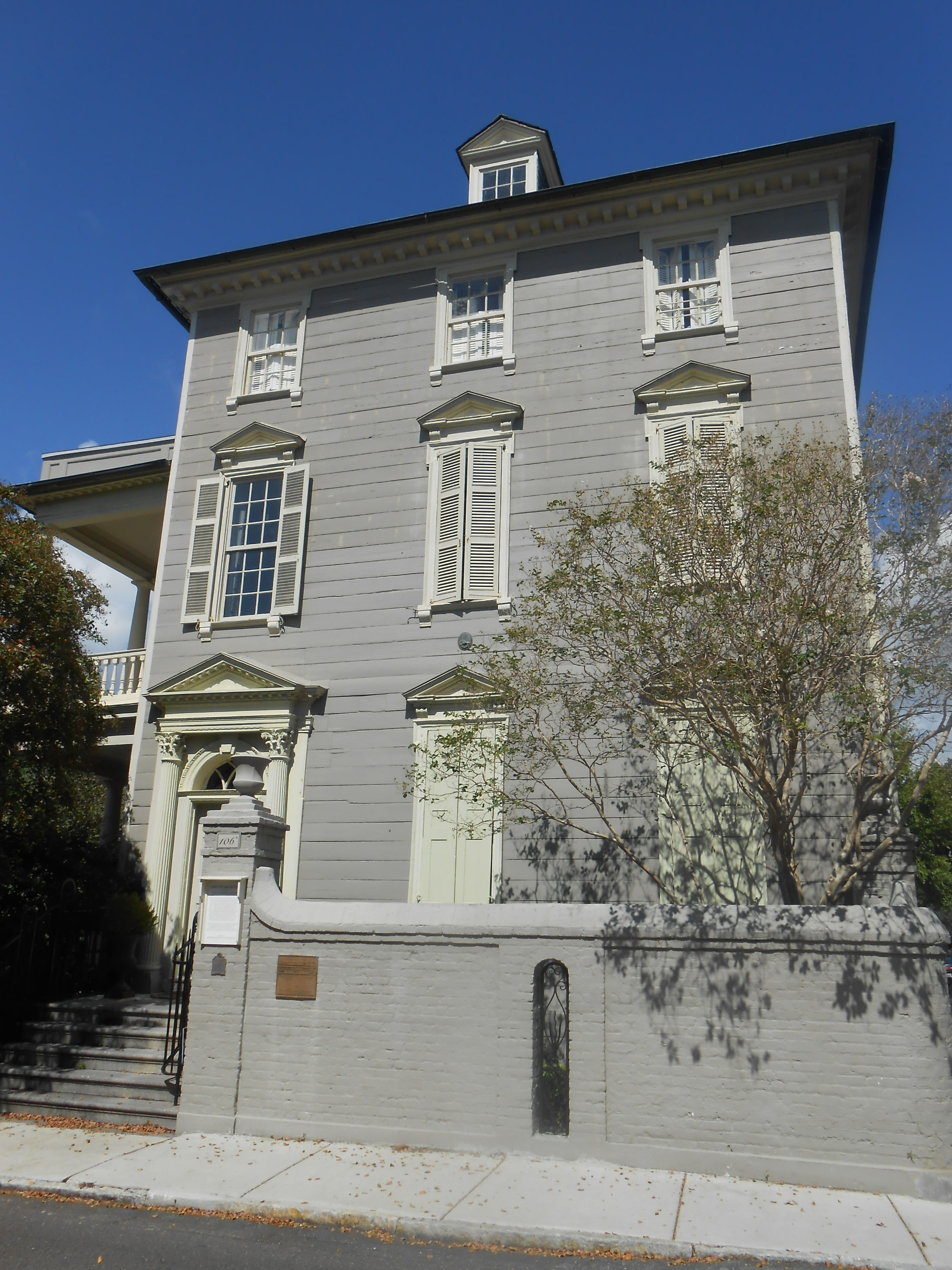
Then-Senator Maybank sold the historic Col. John Stuart House in 1950, saying, "I merely sold my large house because it is not fair for one of Charleston's oldest homes to be closed up 11 months during the year."

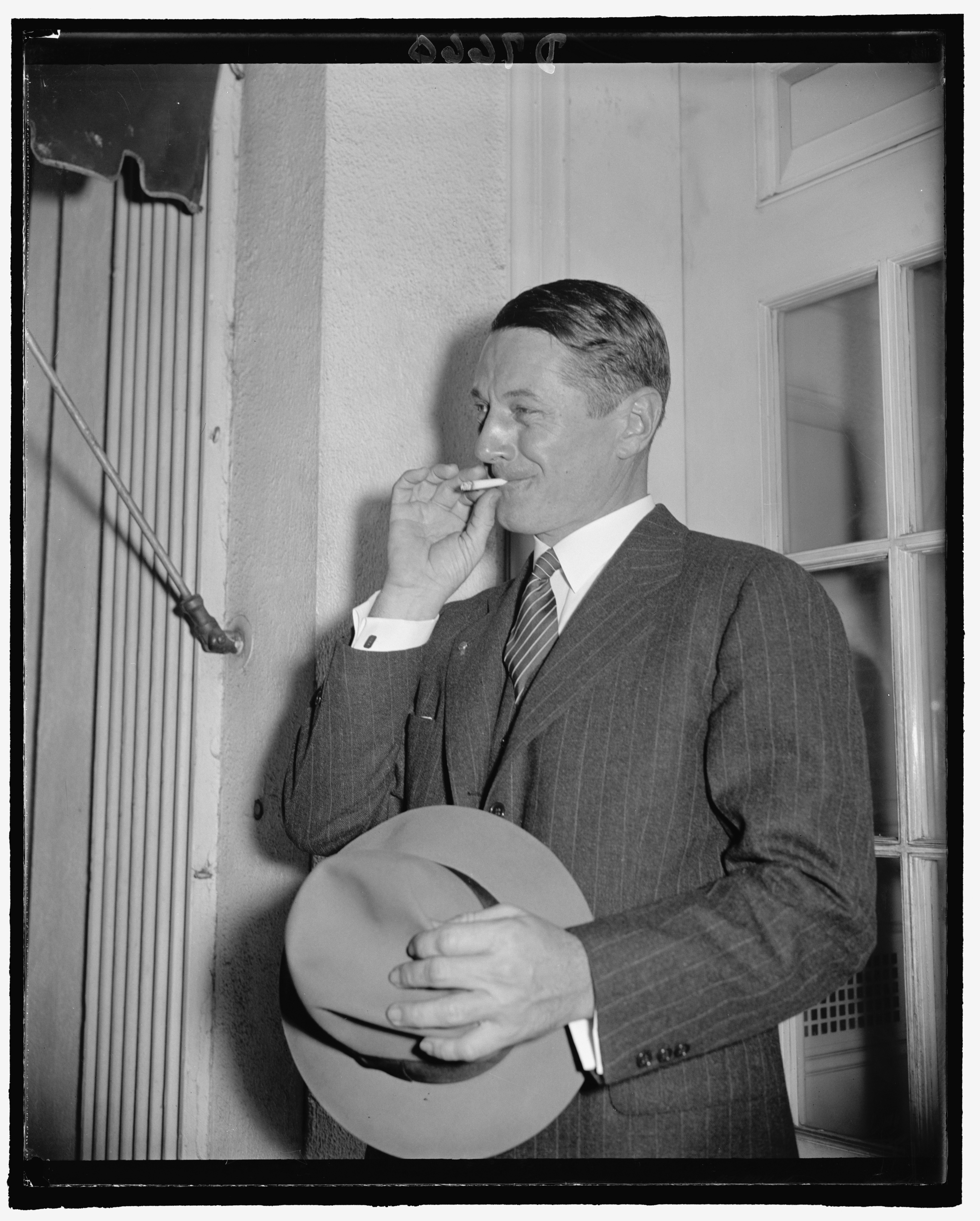
Maybank leaving White House after talk with President Roosevelt.

=== Governor of South Carolina ===
With the favorable publicity from the Santee project, a strong political base in Charleston, and support from his mentor, U.S. Senator James F. Byrnes, Maybank was elected as governor in 1938. As governor, Maybank tried unsuccessfully to create an adequate state police force, but he did supervise a vigorous prosecution of the criminal element in the state. He strictly enforced liquor and gambling statutes. Maybank personally interceded to prevent the destruction of a high wall around the historic jail in Charleston when it became threatened by a housing project expansion.

He fought the Ku Klux Klan, which had reached its peak of revival in the 1920s but was still active. Maybank expanded economic opportunities for black people in the racially segregated society and tried to improve the quality of black schools in the state, which were historically underfunded.

=== Senator and premature death ===
In January 1941 President Roosevelt appointed Byrnes to the U.S. Supreme Court. Maybank won a special election to fill Byrnes's US Senate seat in September 1941, defeating former governor Olin D. Johnston with 56.6 percent of the vote. In 1942 Maybank was elected to the full six-year term, and in 1948 he was reelected without opposition, and served until his death in 1954.

Maybank was a powerful senator, part of the southern Democratic bloc. Maybank served as chairman of the Committee on Banking and Currency and as co-chairman of the Joint Committee on Defense Production. As chair of the Subcommittee on Independent Offices, under the Appropriations Committee, Maybank provided critical support to continue the U.S. nuclear weapons program in the early 1950s. He introduced the "Maybank Amendment", which was tacked onto the 1953 Defense Appropriations Bill. The amendment relieved the Department of Defense from federal legislation to target a percentage of its expenditures to high unemployment areas. Shortly before his death, Maybank was voted as one of the "20 Most Influential Americans" by Fortune magazine.

Maybank died of a heart attack at his summer home in Flat Rock, North Carolina in 1954. He was interred in Magnolia Cemetery in Charleston. Several dignitaries attended including then-Governor James F. Byrnes, Strom Thurmond, Ernest F. Hollings, thirteen United States senators, congressmen, and state and local officials. Maybank's sudden death two months before election day threw open the 1954 Senate election in South Carolina. Strom Thurmond won as a write-in candidate against the nominee chosen by Democratic party leaders to replace Maybank.

Following Maybank's death, numerous places throughout the state were named in his honor including South Carolina Highway 700 (Maybank Highway), the Burnet Maybank Bridge, and the Maybank Hall at the College of Charleston.

== Legacy ==
Bertie Bowman, who became a hearing coordinator for the Senate Foreign Relations Committee, published his memoir, Step by Step: A Memoir of Hope, Friendship, Perseverance, and Living the American Dream, in 2009. He noted the personal support he had received from Senator Maybank. A poor black farmer's son, he went to Washington from South Carolina in 1944 as a runaway at age 14 and went to Senator Maybank. He got the youth a janitor's position, and took a personal interest in Bowman (who then had no family in Washington). Gradually the young black man advanced while working for the Senate, as he describes in his memoir. In March 2009 Senator Maybank's granddaughter, Elizabeth Parker, traveled to D.C. to meet with Bowman for the first time. A month later, more of the Maybank family met Bowman and his wife, Elaine, in Charleston.

Vice President Joe Biden mentioned Maybank at the dedication ceremony for the Ernest Hollings Special Collections Library at the University of South Carolina on July 23, 2010. He said,

You know, an old governor of yours, Burnet Maybank, once wrote an essay entitled, "Who Is the South Carolinian?" And here's what it said. He said, there's a deal—there is a deal of kindness about him, describing the South Carolinian. He feels favored when asked for personal assistance. A neighborly spirit prompts him to render service with a scorn for remuneration.

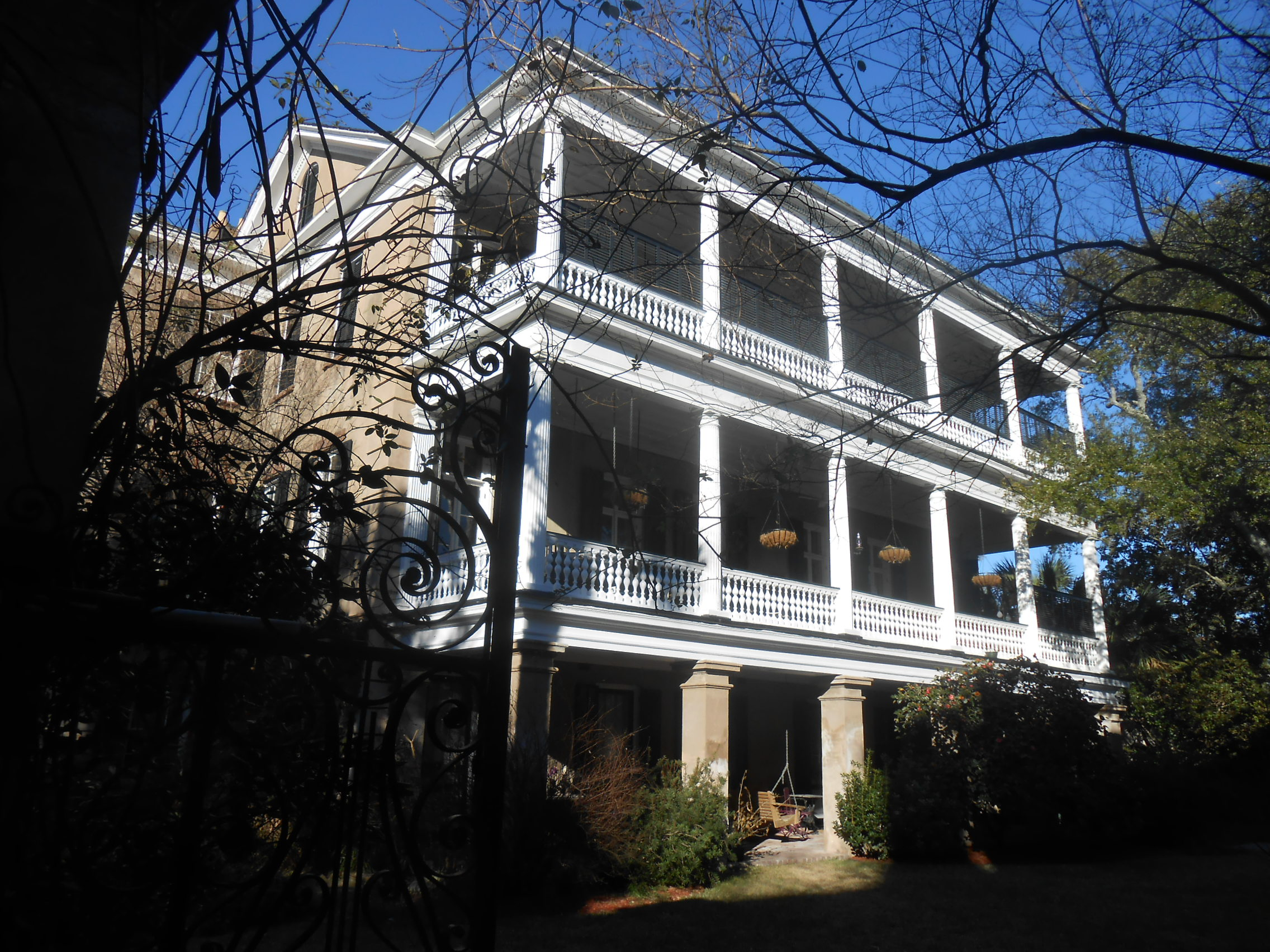
The Cleland Kinloch and Burnet R. Maybank Huger House

Maybank's Charleston residence, known as the Cleland Kinloch and Burnet R. Maybank Huger House, was placed on the National Register of Historic Places in 2015.

== See also ==
- List of members of the United States Congress who died in office (1950–1999)

== Sources ==
- United States Congress. "Burnet R. Maybank (id: M000279)". Biographical Directory of the United States Congress.
- Dictionary of American Biography
- Cann, Marvin. "Burnet Rhett Maybank and the New Deal in South Carolina from 1931 to 1941". PhD dissertation, University of North Carolina, 1967
- U.S. Congress. Memorial Addresses. 83rd Cong., 2nd sess., 1954. Washington, D.C.: Government Printing Office, 1955.

Party political offices
| Preceded by Olin D. Johnston | Democratic nominee for Governor of South Carolina; 1938 | Succeeded by Olin D. Johnston |
| Preceded by James F. Byrnes | Democratic nominee for U.S. Senator from South Carolina (Class 2); 1941, 1942, 1948, 1954 | Succeeded by Edgar Allan Brown |
Political offices
| Preceded by Thomas Porcher Stoney | Mayor of Charleston, South Carolina; 1931–1938 | Succeeded by Henry Whilden Lockwood |
| Preceded by Olin D. Johnston | Governor of South Carolina; 1939–1941 | Succeeded by Joseph Emile Harley |
| Preceded by Charles W. Tobey | Chairman of the Senate Banking Committee; 1949–1953 | Succeeded by Homer Capehart |
U.S. Senate
| Preceded by Roger C. Peace | U.S. senator (Class 2) from South Carolina; 1941–1954; Served alongside: Ellison D. "Cotton Ed" Smith, Olin D. Johnston | Succeeded by Charles E. Daniel |
