= Roger C. Peace =

American politician

Roger Craft Peace
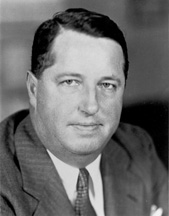

United States Senator from South Carolina
- In office August 5, 1941 – November 4, 1941
- Appointed by: Burnet R. Maybank
- Preceded by: Alva M. Lumpkin
- Succeeded by: Burnet R. Maybank

Personal details
- Born: May 19, 1899 Greenville, South Carolina, U.S.
- Died: August 20, 1968 (aged 69) Greenville, South Carolina, U.S.
- Party: Democratic
- Education: Furman University

Roger Craft Peace (May 19, 1899 – August 20, 1968) was a United States senator from South Carolina. Born in Greenville, he attended the public schools and graduated from Furman University in 1919. He was a newspaper reporter, sports editor, editor, business manager, and publisher in Greenville. During the First World War he served as an instructor in the United States Army at Camp Perry in 1918. He was a colonel on the Governor's staff from 1930 to 1934 and a trustee of Furman University from 1938 to 1948.

Peace was appointed on August 5, 1941, as a Democrat to the U.S. Senate to fill the vacancy caused by the death of Alva M. Lumpkin, who had been appointed to fill the vacancy caused by the resignation of James F. Byrnes, and served from August 5, 1941, until November 4, 1941; he was not a candidate for election to the vacancy, and resumed his career of writing, publishing, and civic activities. At the time of his death, he was chairman of Multimedia, Inc. Peace died in Greenville in 1968; interment was in Springwood Cemetery.

He is succeeded by his two grandsons, Roger C. Peace III and Norlin Peace.

U.S. Senate
| Preceded by Alva M. Lumpkin | U.S. senator (Class 2) from South Carolina; August 5, 1941 – November 4, 1941; Served alongside: Ellison D. Smith | Succeeded by Burnet R. Maybank |
