= Alva M. Lumpkin =

American judge (1886–1941)

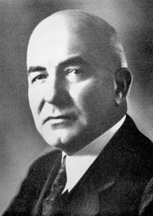

United States Senator from South Carolina
- In office July 22, 1941 – August 1, 1941
- Appointed by: Burnet R. Maybank
- Preceded by: James F. Byrnes
- Succeeded by: Roger C. Peace

Judge of the United States District Court for the Eastern District of South Carolina and United States District Court for the Western District of South Carolina
- In office July 19, 1939 – July 22, 1941
- Appointed by: Franklin D. Roosevelt
- Preceded by: J. Lyles Glenn Jr.
- Succeeded by: George Timmerman Sr.

Personal details
- Born: Alva Moore Lumpkin; November 13, 1886 Milledgeville, Georgia, U.S.
- Died: August 1, 1941 (aged 54) Washington, D.C., U.S.
- Resting place: Elmwood Cemetery
- Party: Democratic
- Education: University of South Carolina School of Law (LLB)

Alva Moore Lumpkin (November 13, 1886 – August 1, 1941) was a United States district judge of the United States District Court for the Eastern District of South Carolina and the United States District Court for the Western District of South Carolina and was a United States senator from South Carolina.

== Education and career ==
Born on November 13, 1886, in Milledgeville, Baldwin County, Georgia, Lumpkin moved with his parents to Columbia, South Carolina, in 1898. There were seven siblings, who by birth order were: Elizabeth (teacher), Hope (clergyman), Alva (politician), Morris (lawyer), Grace (writer), and Katharine (academic). He attended the public schools in Milledgeville and Columbia, then received a Bachelor of Laws in 1908 from the University of South Carolina School of Law and was admitted to the bar the same year. He entered private practice in Columbia from 1908 to 1939. He was an assistant clerk for the South Carolina Senate from 1906 to 1908. He was a member of the South Carolina House of Representatives from 1911 to 1913. He was a member of the Conciliation Commission for Advancement of Peace between the United States and Uruguay in 1914. He was an acting assistant attorney general for South Carolina in 1918. He was a member of the South Carolina Board of Pardons from 1922 to 1923. He was an acting Associate Justice of the Supreme Court of South Carolina from 1926 to 1934.

== Federal judicial service ==
Lumpkin was nominated by President Franklin D. Roosevelt on May 17, 1939, to a joint seat on the United States District Court for the Eastern District of South Carolina and the United States District Court for the Western District of South Carolina vacated by Judge John Lyles Glenn Jr. He was confirmed by the United States Senate on May 22, 1939, and received his commission on July 19, 1939. His service terminated on July 22, 1941, due to his resignation.

== Brief Senate service and death ==
Lumpkin was appointed on July 17, 1941, as a Democrat to the United States Senate to fill the vacancy caused by the resignation of United States Senator James F. Byrnes and served from July 22, 1941, until his death in Washington, D.C., on August 1, 1941, following a gastric hemorrhage two days prior. He was interred in Elmwood Cemetery in Columbia, South Carolina.

== See also ==
- List of members of the United States Congress who died in office (1900–1949)

== Sources ==
- United States Congress. "Alva M. Lumpkin (id: L000510)". Biographical Directory of the United States Congress.

Legal offices
Preceded by John Lyles Glenn Jr.	Judge of the United States District Court for the Eastern District of South Carolina; Judge of the United States District Court for the Western District of South Carolina; 1939–1941	Succeeded by George Bell Timmerman Sr.
U.S. Senate
Preceded by James F. Byrnes	U.S. senator (Class 2) from South Carolina; 1941; Served alongside: Ellison D. Smith	Succeeded by Roger C. Peace
