= Malary =

Malary can refer to:

- Malary, Kościerzyna County, Poland, a village
- Malary, Starogard County, Poland, another village
- Guy Malary (1943 – 1993), the Justice Minister of Haiti

== See also ==
- Mallory, a surname
- Mallory (disambiguation)
- Malaria (disambiguation)
