= Leigh Mallory =

Leigh Mallory is the name of:

- Trafford Leigh-Mallory (1892–1944), British airman
- George Leigh Mallory (1886–1924), British mountaineer

== See also ==
- Mallory
