= Mallory (disambiguation) =

Mallory is an English surname and given name.

Mallory may also refer to:

== Places ==
- Mallory, Minnesota
- Mallory, West Virginia
- Mallory Park, a motor racing circuit in Leicestershire, England
- Mallory Square, a public square in Key West, Florida, United States
- Mallory Township, Clayton County, Iowa

== Other uses ==
- Mallory (novel), a 1950 novel by James Hadley Chase
- Mallory (Sliders), a character in the TV series Sliders
- Mallory body, an inclusion found in the cytoplasm of liver cells
- P. R. Mallory and Co Inc, a producer of dry battery cells that was the predecessor to Duracell
- Mallory, a fictional, placeholder name for a malicious attacker in computer security and cryptographic discussions; see Alice and Bob

== See also ==
- List of places named Mallory, a list of places categorized by region and fictional places
- List of places named Mallory (historical), a list of historical places named Mallory which no longer exist or are known by other names
