= US Senate career of Strom Thurmond =

Career of Strom Thurmond in the United States Senate

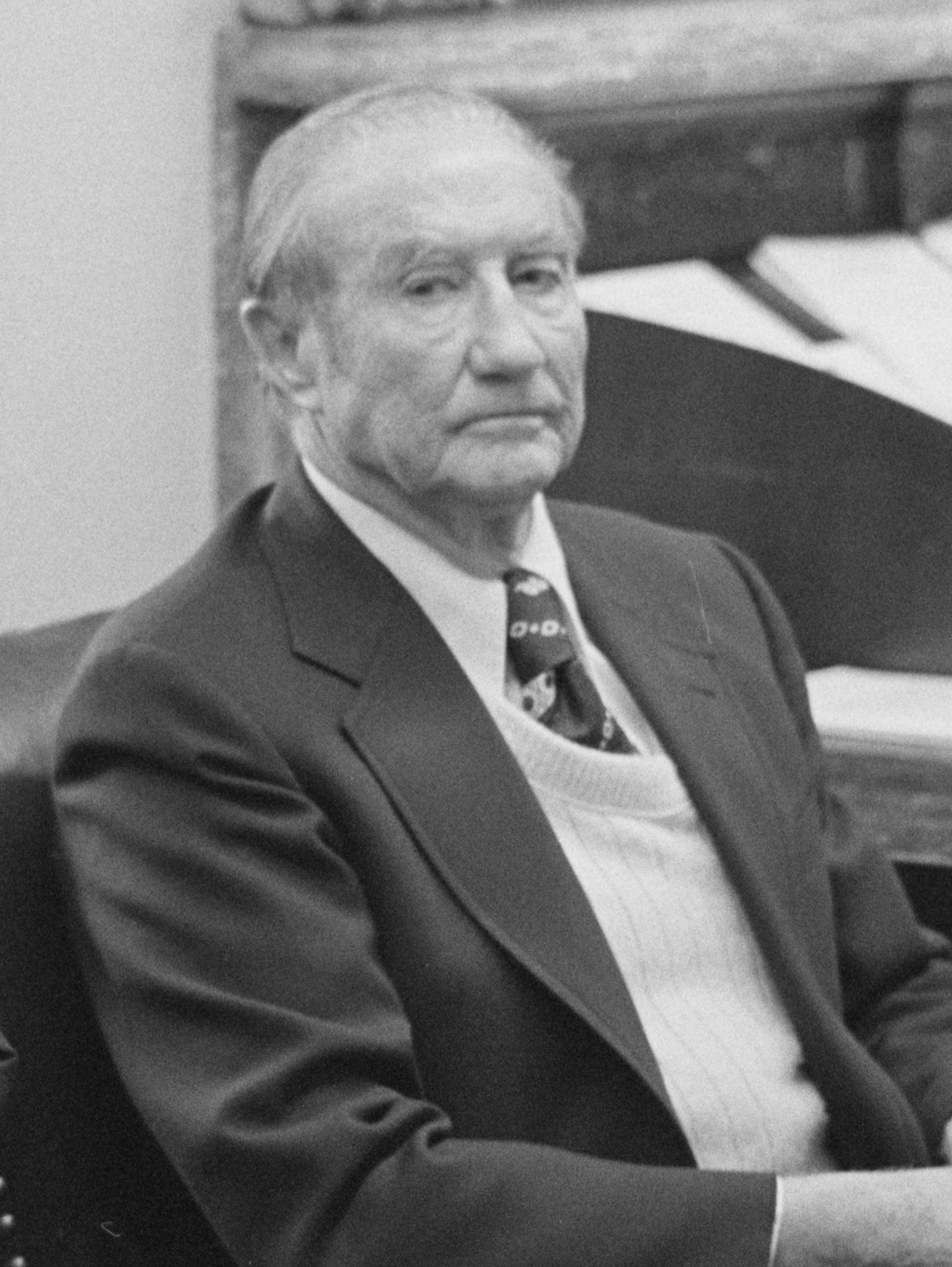
Thurmond in 1979

Strom Thurmond served in the United States Senate from 1954 to 2003 (interrupted in 1956). He was a supporter of the presidencies of Richard Nixon, Gerald Ford, Ronald Reagan, George H. W. Bush, and George W. Bush.

== First and second terms (1954–1956, 1956–1961) ==
The incumbent U.S. senator from South Carolina, Burnet R. Maybank, was unopposed for re-election in 1954, but he died two months before the election. Various leaders requested a primary election for choosing the new nominee; however, the Democratic Party selected Edgar A. Brown, a state senator, as the party's nominee to replace Maybank without conducting a primary election. Thurmond organized a write-in campaign for the vacant senate seat. He pledged that if he won, he would resign in 1956 to force a primary election. He won the 1954 election easily, receiving almost 63% of the vote. His victory made him the first person to be elected to the U.S. Senate as a write-in candidate. (Note: It has only been repeated once, in 2010, by Lisa Murkowski) In January 1955, he stated that federal encroachment on states' rights was among the biggest threats to American life and violated the Constitution. He spoke of the importance of education, saying, "it should be a primary duty of the states just as national defense is a primary obligation of the federal government." In July 1955, Thurmond supported the Eisenhower Administration's bill for an expanded military reserve law, including peacetime officers receiving compulsory training. He argued the bill would strengthen Eisenhower during the Geneva Summit. He opposed the alternate plan proposed by Senator Richard Russell, which argued to abolish compulsory training in addition to adding a bonus of $400 (equivalent to $4,807 in 2025) to males forgoing active duty. Thurmond asserted that patriotism could not be purchased.

Thurmond co-wrote the first version of the Southern Manifesto, stating disagreement with the 1954 U.S. Supreme Court ruling in Brown v. Board of Education, that desegregated public schools. He was part of the group of Southern senators who shared a commonality of being dispirited with Brown v. Board of Education. In early 1956, he resigned from the Senate, keeping the promise he made two years earlier. He won the primary as well as the general election unopposed. Thereafter, he returned to the Senate in November 1956. In 1957, the Eisenhower administration introduced an amended version of the Civil Rights Bill, imposing expansion of federal supervision of integration in Southern states. In an unsuccessful attempt to prevent the bill's passage, Thurmond filibustered the bill, speaking for a total of 24 hours and 18 minutes, the longest filibuster ever conducted by a single senator at the time. Other Southern senators, who had agreed as part of a compromise not to filibuster this bill, were upset with Thurmond because they thought his defiance made them look incompetent to their constituents. Despite his efforts, the Congress passed the Civil Rights Act of 1957 on August 29. In January 1959, the Senate held a debate over changing the rules to curb filibusters, Thurmond expressed the view that the Senate return to the rule prior to 1917, when there were no regulations on the time for debate.

=== Further attempts at obstruction ===
In February 1960, Thurmond requested a quorum call that would produce at least half the membership of the Senate, the call being seen as one of the delay tactics employed by Southerners during the meeting. 51 senators assembled, allowing for the Senate to adjourn in spite of Thurmond's calls for another quorum call. Thurmond afterward denied his responsibility in convening the Saturday session, attributing it to Democrat Lyndon B. Johnson and opining that those insistent on passing a civil rights bill should be around during discussions on the matter. During his filibuster, Thurmond relied on the book The Case for the South, written by W. D. Workman Jr. Thurmond had known the author for fifteen years as Workman had covered both Thurmond's tenure as South Carolina governor and his presidential campaign, in addition to having served in the military unit Thurmond had organized in Columbia, and having turned down an offer by Thurmond to serve as his Washington office press secretary. The Case for the South, described in 2013 by Loyola history professor and author Elizabeth Shermer as "a compendium of segregationist arguments that hit all the high points of regional apologia", was sent by Thurmond to each of his Senate colleagues and then-vice president Richard Nixon.

== Third term (1961–1967) ==
=== 1960 presidential election ===
On account of Kennedy's known support for Civil Rights, Thurmond refused to support the Democratic Party's nominee in the 1960 United States presidential election. Thurmond himself was up for re-election that year and despite his party disloyalty, he won the South Carolina Democratic Primary with nearly 90% of the vote. Like much of the South during this time period, South Carolina was still effectively a one-party state where winning the Democratic primary was tantamount to victory. In the 1960 South Carolina Senate race, Thurmond ran unopposed in the General Election, a Republican candidate did not even appear on the ballot. As of 2021, 1960 remains the last time a Democrat won South Carolina's Class 2 Senate Seat. In the presidential election, he received 14 electoral votes for the vice president (as Harry Byrd Sr.'s running mate). Though Both Byrd and Thurmond had long since moved on from the States Rights' Democratic Party, they were the decided protest ticket of several southern delegates and unpledged electors, who refused to give their support to Kennedy. Though their actual level of electoral support is difficult to determine, "the Byrd–Thurmond ticket" or "Unpledged candidate", won a plurality of the vote of the vote in Mississippi, finished second (ahead of Nixon) in Alabama and third in Louisiana with 20% of the vote.

Following Kennedy's victory, Thurmond loudly voiced the view that he would be expelled from the Senate Democratic Caucus in retaliation. Though not a position ever endorsed by either Kennedy or the DNC, some Democrats were angered by Thurmond's determined opposition and felt he should be kicked out of the party for his disloyalty.

=== Kennedy administration ===
The 87th Congress began without a move to remove Thurmond from the Senate Democratic Caucus, in spite of Thurmond's predictions to the contrary. An aide for Senator Joseph S. Clark Jr. said there was never an intention to pursue recourse against Thurmond, though in his opinion Thurmond should no longer be a member of the party. In February 1961, Thurmond stated his support for imposing quotas per country and category on textile imports; noting that the same practice was being imposed by other countries. He added that American industry would be destroyed by government subsidies that would convert the textile industry to other fields. He later opposed legislation that "would give the president unprecedented authority to lower or wipe out tariff wall [and] would provide for the first time broad government relief to industries and workers", the only Democrat to do so. In December 1961, he addressed the Arkansas American Legion conference in Little Rock. He claimed he had been told that the State Department was preparing "a paper for the turning over of our nuclear weapons to the United Nations." In September 1962, Thurmond called for an invasion of Cuba. In a February Thurmond stated that "the brush curtain around Cuba is a formidable Soviet strategic military base" and estimated between 30,000 and 40,000 Cuban troops were under the leadership of a Soviet general. Hours after the statement was made public, a Pentagon official disputed his claims as being "at wide variance with carefully evaluated data collected by U.S. intelligence" and called for Thurmond to release his proof to the Defense Department. During Paul Nitze's nomination hearing for Secretary of the Navy, Thurmond was noted for asking "rapid fire questions" on military action and focusing on Nitze's participation as a moderator in the 1958 National Council of Churches conference. Along with Arizona Senator Barry Goldwater, Thurmond delayed the Nitze nomination. In spite of Thurmond voting against him, the nomination was approved.

When the Senate debated Kennedy's public school aid bill, Thurmond proposed an amendment prohibiting the government from barring segregated schools from receiving loans or grants. After Kennedy sent Congress his civil rights bill, Thurmond's opposition was clear and immediate. Later that month, Thurmond accused radio and television networks of supporting the views espoused by the NAACP, sparking a dispute with Rhode Island Senator John Pastore. In the weeks leading up to the March on Washington, Thurmond delivered a Senate floor speech, accusing the march's organizer Bayard Rustin of "being a communist, a draft dodger and a homosexual." Rustin biographer John D'Emilio said these remarks unintentionally gave Rustin further credit in the Civil Rights Movement: "Because no one could appear to be on the side of Strom Thurmond, he created, unwittingly, an opportunity for Rustin's sexuality to stop being an issue." Rustin denied Thurmond's charges on August 15.

==== Investigation into political censorship by the military ====
In August, Thurmond formally requested the Senate Armed Services Committee to vote on whether to vote for "a conspiracy to muzzle military anti-Communist drives." The appearance prompted the cancellation of another public appearance in Fort Jackson, as Thurmond favored marking his proposal with his presence, and his request for a $75,000 committee study was slated for consideration. In November, Thurmond went on a five-day tour of California. At a news conference, he stated that President Kennedy had lost support in the South due to the formation of the National Relations Boards, what he called Kennedy's softness on communism, and an increase in military men being muzzled for speaking out against communism. Thurmond held resentment toward NBC for its lack of coverage of his military muzzling claims. In January 1962, Thurmond charged the military speeches' censorship with having proven State Department officials sold U.S. leadership on the country not wanting to win the Cold War. That month, Senate investigators into the military censoring disclosed having obtained documents not given to them by Secretary of Defense Robert McNamara. Thurmond stated the evidence was obtained through checking with the individuals censoring, describing them as just taking orders. He added that the issue of censoring had predated the Kennedy administration, though charged the incumbent executive branch with having increased its practice. The committee was ended on June 8. In May, Thurmond was part of a group of Senate orators headed by John C. Stennis who expressed opposition to the Kennedy administration's literacy test bill, arguing that the measure was in violation of states' rights as defined by the Constitution. After the Supreme Court ruled state composed prayer in public schools was unconstitutional, Thurmond urged Congress to take steps to prevent the Court from making similar decisions.

=== Johnson administration ===
The day after the Nitze vote, President Kennedy was assassinated in Dallas, Texas. Thurmond expressed the view that a conspiracy would be found by investigators to have been responsible for JFK's death. Vice President Lyndon B. Johnson ascended to the presidency. He began campaigning to secure passage of the Civil Rights Act of 1964 and the Voting Rights Act of 1965, which angered white segregationists. These laws ended segregation and committed the federal government to enforce voting rights of citizens by the supervision of elections in states in which the pattern of voting showed black people had been disenfranchised. Many Democrats strongly opposed these laws, including Senator Robert Byrd, who filibustered the Civil Rights Act for 14 hours and 13 minutes on June 9 and 10, 1964.

During the signing ceremony for the Civil Rights Act, President Johnson nominated LeRoy Collins as the first Director of the Community Relations Service. Subsequently, Thurmond reminded Collins of his past support for segregation and implied that he was a traitor to the South, Thurmond having particular disdain for an address by Collins the previous winter in which he charged southern leaders with being harsh and intemperate. Thurmond also suggested that Collins had sought to fault southern leaders for President Kennedy's assassination. Thurmond was the only senator to vote against Collins' nomination being sent to the Senate, and later one of eight senators to vote against his nomination in the chamber.

=== Wrestling with Yarborough ===
Shortly after the passing of the Civil Rights Act of 1964, on July 9, Johnson nominated former Florida governor LeRoy Collins to a position in the Community Relations Service, which was designed to mediate racial disputes. Thurmond, the most senior southern member of the Commerce Committee, bitterly opposed Collins' nomination, based on a speech that Collins made in Thurmond's home state where he stated that southern leaders' "harsh and intemperate" language unnecessarily stoked racial unrest. Commerce Chairman Warren Magnuson was aware that he had the votes in favour of the nomination, but had failed to get the required quorum. Thurmond, aware of the chairman's struggles, stationed himself outside of the committee door, physically blocking any entry from the later-arriving U.S. Senators.

Later, Ralph Yarborough arrived, and was blocked from entering. Yarborough, the only southern senator to have voted in favor of the Civil Rights Act, joked to Thurmond "Come on in, Strom, and help us get a quorum." Thurmond responded "If I can keep you out, you won't go in, and if you can drag me in, I'll stay there." Thurmond & Yarborough were both 61 years old, but Thurmond was 30 pounds lighter and much more physically fit. After some light scuffling, both senators removed their suit jackets. Thurmond overpowered Yarborough, who he managed to bring to the floor. "Tell me to release you, Ralph, and I will," said Thurmond, although the out-of-breath Yarborough refused. Another senator approached, suggesting that they stop before one of them has a heart attack. Eventually, the fight was broken up by Chair Magnuson, who growled, "Come on, you fellows, let's break this up." Yarborough made his exit line, grunting "I have to yield to the order of my chairman." Thurmond and Yarborough both composed themselves and entered the committee chamber.

Despite the fact that Thurmond had won the wrestling match, Collins was nominated 16 to 1.

=== 1964 presidential election and party switch ===
On September 16, 1964, Thurmond confirmed he was leaving the Democratic Party to work on the presidential campaign of Barry Goldwater, charging the Democrats with having "abandoned the people" and having repudiated the U.S. Constitution as well as providing leadership for the eventual takeover of the U.S. by socialistic dictatorship. He called on other Southern politicians to join him in bettering the Republican Party. Thurmond joined Goldwater in campaigning through Louisiana later that month, telling reporters that he believed Goldwater could carry South Carolina in the general election along with other southern states. Though Goldwater lost in a landslide, he won South Carolina with 59% of the vote compared to President Lyndon Johnson 41%.

Senate Republicans had a lukewarm reaction to Thurmond joining their caucus. The 1964 United States elections had been an all around disaster for the Republicans, who not only lost the race for the presidency by the largest margin in history but were reduced to a "super minority" of only 32 seats in the Senate prior to Thurmond's switch. On January 15, 1965, Senate Republicans voted for committee assignments granting Thurmond the ability "to keep at least some of the seniority power he had gained as a Democrat."

Following the election, Johnson continued to push through Civil Rights legislation, most notably the Voting Rights Act in 1965, which committed the federal government to enforce voting rights of citizens by the supervision of elections in states with noted record of voter suppression and disenfranchisement. Thurmond stated that his opposition to the Voting Rights Act was due to not favoring its authorization of the federal government to determine the processes behind how statewide elections are conducted and insisted he was not opposed to black voter turnout. During floor debate on the bill, Republican Senate Leader Everett Dirksen spoke in favor of the VRA, calling it a means to ensure that the rights granted by the Constitution could be afforded to every American, Thurmond retorted that the VRA would lead to "despotism and tyranny."

The Voting Rights Act passed into law by a slightly larger margin than the Civil Rights Act had. Thurmond's opposition to Civil Rights legislation proved no more successful as a Republican than it did as a Democrat. In the Senate, Thurmond had gone from being one of twenty-one Democrats to vote against the Civil Rights Act to being one of only two Republicans to vote in opposition to the VRA.

In 1965, L. Mendel Rivers became chairman of the House Armed Services Committee. Commentator Wayne King credited Thurmond's involvement with Rivers as giving Rivers' district "an even dozen military installations that are said to account for one‐third to one‐half of the jobs in the area."

In 1966, former governor Ernest "Fritz" Hollings won South Carolina's other Senate seat in a special election and Thurmond became the state's senior senator. He and Thurmond served together for over 36 years, making them the longest-serving Senate duo in American history. Thurmond and Hollings had a very good relationship, despite their often stark philosophical differences. Their long tenure meant their seniority in the Senate gave South Carolina clout in national politics well beyond its modest population.

== Fourth and fifth terms (1967–1973, 1973–1979) ==
Thurmond faced no opposition in the Republican primary and was renominated in March 1966. Thurmond competed against Bradley Morrah Jr. in the general election campaign. Morrah avoided direct charges against Thurmond's record and generally spoke of his own ambitions in the event he was elected. He referred to Thurmond's time in the Senate as being ineffective. Thurmond won election with 62.2 percent of the vote (271,297 votes) to Morrah's 37.8 percent (164,955 votes).

On January 17, 1967, Thurmond was appointed to the Senate Judiciary subcommittee on Constitutional Rights. In March, as the Senate passed an endorsement of the United States antiballistic missile system, Thurmond engaged in a back and forth with Joseph Clark after Clark mentioned that Charleston, South Carolina would be included in the Pentagon's list of twenty-five American cities that would get priority in their antimissile protection and attributed this to the influence of Chairman of the House Armed Services Committee L. Mendel Rivers. Thurmond then demanded a rule that would bar senators from being able to disparage members of the House of Representatives in addition to preventing them from speaking and having to remain seated. Clark argued that the rule did not apply to him since he had finished speaking, Thurmond rebutting, "If the senator is not going to be man enough to take his medicine, then let him go." Thurmond then won unanimous approval to have Clark's remarks removed from the record. In July, after the 1967 USS Forrestal fire, Thurmond wrote of his conviction that the outbreak had been precipitated by communists. In September, Thurmond warned against enacting any of the three proposed Panama Canal treaties, which he said could lead to Communist control of the waterway if enacted.

In 1969, Time ran a story accusing Thurmond of receiving "an extraordinarily high payment for land". Thurmond responded to the claim on September 15, saying the tale was a liberal smear intended to damage his political influence, later calling the magazine "anti-South". At a news conference on September 19, Thurmond named executive director of the South Carolina Democratic Party Donald L. Fowler as the individual who had spread the story, a charge that Fowler denied.

=== Supreme Court nomination ===
In June 1967, Johnson nominated Thurgood Marshall to be the first African-American Justice on the Supreme Court. Along with Sam Ervin, Spessard Holland, and James Eastland, Thurmond was one of four senators noted for calling Marshall a "Constitutional iconoclast" in Senate debate. Thurmond questioned Marshall for an hour "on fine points of constitutional law and history", the move being seen as critics of the nomination turning their inquiry to the subject of Marshall's legal experience. Thurmond stated that Marshall had evaded questions on his legal principles during committee hearings and in spite of his extensive experience, had displayed an ignorance of basic constitutional principles. Marshall was still confirmed by the Senate at the end of that month.

In 1968, Chief Justice Earl Warren decided to retire, and Johnson subsequently nominated Abe Fortas to succeed him. On the third day of hearings, Thurmond questioned Fortas over Mallory v. United States (1957), a case taking place before Fortas's tenure, but for which he was nonetheless held responsible by Thurmond. Thurmond asked Fortas if the Supreme Court decision in the Mallory v. United States case was an encouragement of individuals to commit serious crimes such as rape and if he believed in "that kind of justice", an inquiry that shocked even the usually stoic Fortas. Thurmond displayed sex magazines, which he called "obscene, foul, putrid, filthy and repulsive", to validate his charges that Supreme Court rulings overturning obscenity convictions had led to a large wave of hardcore pornography material. Thurmond stated that Fortas had backed overturning 23 of the 26 lower court obscenity decisions. Thurmond also arranged for the screening of explicit films that Fortas had purportedly legalized, to be played before reporters and his own Senate colleagues. In September, Vice President Hubert Humphrey spoke of a deal made between Thurmond and Nixon over Thurmond's opposition to the Fortas nomination. Both Nixon and Thurmond denied Humphrey's claims, Thurmond saying that he had never discussed the nomination with Nixon while conceding the latter had unsuccessfully tried to sway him from opposing Fortas.

In December 1968, Thurmond stated that President Johnson had considered calling for a special session of Congress to nominate Arthur J. Goldberg as Chief Justice before becoming convinced there would be problems during the process.

Thurmond decried the Supreme Court opinion in Alexander v. Holmes County Board of Education (1969), which ordered the immediate desegregation of schools in the American South. This had followed continued Southern resistance for more than a decade to desegregation following the 1954 U.S. Supreme Court ruling in Brown v. Board of Education that segregation of public schools was unconstitutional. Thurmond praised President Nixon and his "Southern Strategy" of delaying desegregation, saying Nixon "stood with the South in this case".

In an April 25, 1969 Senate floor speech, Thurmond stated that The New York Times "had a conflict of interest in its attacks on Otto F. Otepka's appointment to the Subversive Activities Control Board." On May 29, Thurmond called for Associate Justice William O. Douglas to resign over what he considered political activities. Douglas remained in office for another six years. In the latter part of the year, President Nixon nominated Clement Haynsworth for associate justice. This came after the White House consulted with Thurmond throughout all of July, as Thurmond had become impressed with Haynsworth following their close collaboration. Thurmond wrote to Haynsworth that he had worked harder on his nomination than any other that had occurred since his Senate career began. The Haynsworth nomination was rejected in the Senate. Years later, at a March 1977 hearing, Thurmond told Haynsworth, "It's a pity you are not on the Supreme Court today. Several senators who voted against you have told me they would vote for you if they had it to do again."

=== 1968 presidential election ===
On October 23, 1966, Thurmond stated that President Johnson could be defeated in a re-election bid by a Republican challenger since the candidate was likely to be less obnoxious than the president.

Thurmond was an early supporter of a second presidential campaign by Nixon, his backing coming from the latter's position on the Vietnam War. Thurmond met with Nixon during the Republican primary and promised he would not give in to the "depredations of the Reagan forces." At the 1968 Republican National Convention in Miami Beach, Florida, Thurmond, along with Mississippi state chairman Clarke Reed, former U.S. Representative and gubernatorial nominee Howard Callaway of Georgia, and Charlton Lyons of Louisiana held the Deep South states solidly for Richard M. Nixon despite the sudden last-minute entry of Governor Ronald Reagan of California into the race. Governor Nelson Rockefeller of New York was also in the race but having little effect. In the fall 1968 general election, Nixon won South Carolina with 38 percent of the popular vote and gained South Carolina's electoral votes. With the segregationist Democrat George Wallace on the ballot, the South Carolina Democratic voters split almost evenly between the Democratic Party nominee, Hubert Humphrey, who received 29.6 percent of the total vote, and Wallace, who received 32.3 percent. Other Deep South states swung to Wallace and posted weak totals for Nixon.

Thurmond had quieted conservative fears over rumors that Nixon planned to ask either liberal Republicans Charles Percy or Mark Hatfield to be his running mate. He informed Nixon that both men were unacceptable to the South for the vice-presidency. Nixon ultimately asked Governor Spiro Agnew from Maryland—an acceptable choice to Thurmond—to join the ticket.

During the general election campaign, Agnew stated that he did not believe Thurmond was a racist when asked his opinion on the matter. Clayton Fritchey of the Lewiston Evening Journal cited Agnew's answer over the Thurmond question as an example of the vice presidential candidate not being ready for the same "big league pitching" Nixon had shown during the 1952 election cycle. Thurmond participated in a two-day tour of Georgia during October, saying that a vote for American Independent Party candidate George Wallace was a waste, adding that Wallace could not win nationally and would only swing the election in favor of Democratic nominee Hubert Humphrey by having the Democratic-majority House of Representatives select him in the event none of the candidates received enough electoral votes to win the presidency outright. Thurmond also stated that Nixon and Wallace had similar views and predicted Nixon would carry Virginia, South Carolina, North Carolina, Florida, Texas and Tennessee. Nixon carried each of these states with the exception of Texas.

=== Nixon administration ===
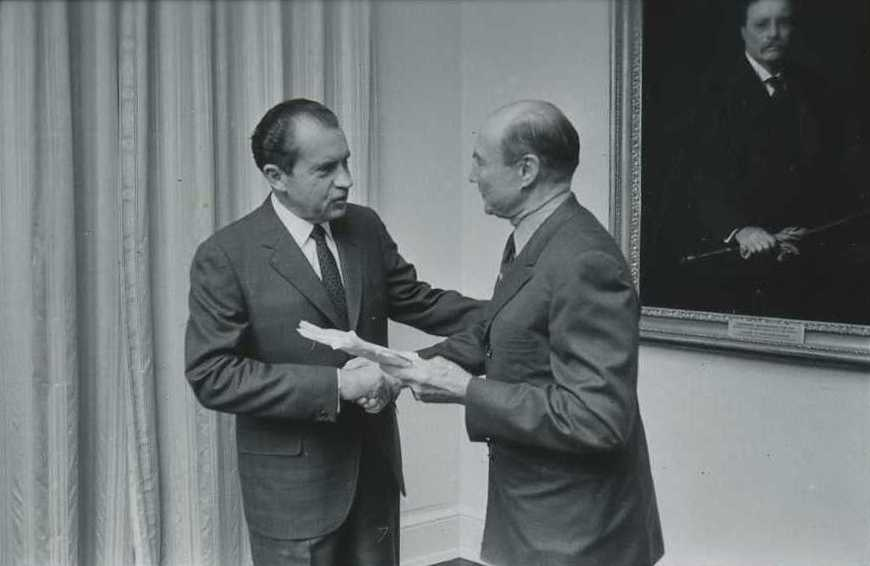
Thurmond with President Richard Nixon in 1969

Thanks to his close relationship with the Nixon administration, Thurmond was able to deliver a great deal of federal money, appointments and projects to his state. With a like-minded president in the White House, Thurmond became an effective power broker in Washington. His staffers said his goal was to be South Carolina's "indispensable man" in Washington, D.C.

In the 1970 gubernatorial election, Thurmond's preferred candidate, U.S. Representative Albert W. Watson, was defeated by his more moderate opponent, Democrat John C. West, the outgoing lieutenant governor, who had opposed Thurmond's initial write-in election to the Senate. Watson had defected to the Republicans in 1965, the year after Thurmond's own bolt, and had been politically close to the senator. Watson lost mainly after several Republican officials in South Carolina shied away from him because of his continuing opposition to civil rights legislation. Watson's loss caused Thurmond slowly to moderate his own image in regard to changing race relations.

In February 1971, Senate Republicans voted unanimously to bestow Thurmond full seniority, the vote being seen as "little more than a gesture since committee assignments are the major item settled by seniority and Senator Thurmond has his." Later that month, when Massachusetts Senator Ted Kennedy visited South Carolina to deliver an address in Charleston, Thurmond gave remarks to the Charleston Chapter of the Air Force Association several hours earlier, mocking Kennedy for the Chappaquiddick incident. Thurmond noted that Brigadier General Thomas Kennedy's wife was named Joan, the same first name as Joan Bennett Kennedy, the senator's wife. He added that the Joan married to the Brigadier General had a husband who was a better driver.

In the 1976 Republican primary, President Ford faced a challenge from former California Governor Ronald Reagan, who selected Richard Schweiker as his running mate. Though Thurmond backed Reagan's candidacy, he, along with North Carolina Senator Jesse Helms, led efforts to oust Schweiker from the ticket. During the subsequent general election, Thurmond appeared in a campaign commercial for incumbent U.S. President Gerald Ford in his race against Thurmond's fellow Southerner, former Georgia Governor Jimmy Carter. In the commercial, Thurmond said Ford (who was born in Nebraska and spent most of his life in Michigan) "sound[ed] more like a Southerner than Jimmy Carter".

A short time after Mississippian Thad Cochran entered the Senate in late 1978, Thurmond gave him advice on how to vote against bills intended to aid African-Americans but not lose their voting support: "Your black friends will be with you, if you be sure to help them with their projects."

==== Domestic policies ====
In April 1970, Thurmond was among a group of senators who voted against replacing the electoral college with the popular vote as the determining factor in presidential elections.

In April 1979, during a congressional hearing attended by Coretta Scott King and other witnesses in favor of establishing the birthday of Martin Luther King Jr. as a national holiday, Thurmond stated that the Civil Service Commission had estimated that enacting the holiday would cost the government $22 million to cover pay for federal employees. Thurmond furthered that taxpayers would be forced to pay $195 million to accommodate the employees. Ted Kennedy responded to Thurmond by saying that the estimates were not factoring in the revenue that could be generated from sales on the proposed holiday.

===== Urban unrest and political activism =====
In September 1970, Thurmond attended the 10th anniversary meeting of the Young Americans for Freedom at the University of Hartford, delivering a speech on the rise of guerilla warfare in the United States through urban and campus riots and how it could eventually lead to the dissolution of the country. Thurmond stated the riots would have been less likely to occur had more force been used on the part of authorities and the same belief system should have been adapted in American policy toward Vietnam, which he elaborated on by advocating for American forces receiving more resources needed to secure victories.

On February 22, 1970, Thurmond delivered an address at Drew University defending Julius Hoffman, a judge who had drawn controversy for his role in the Chicago Seven trial. Protestors threw marshmallows at Thurmond in response to the speech, Thurmond telling the hecklers that they were cowards for not hearing what he had to say.

On February 4, 1972, Thurmond sent a secret memo to William Timmons (in his capacity as an aide to Richard Nixon) and United States Attorney General John N. Mitchell, with an attached file from the Senate Internal Security Subcommittee, urging that British musician John Lennon (then living in New York City) be deported from the United States as an undesirable alien, due to Lennon's political views and activism. The document claimed Lennon's influence on young people could affect Nixon's chances of re-election, and suggested that terminating Lennon's visa might be "a strategy counter-measure". Thurmond's memo and attachment, received by the White House on February 7, 1972, initiated the Nixon administration's persecution of John Lennon that threatened the former Beatle with deportation for nearly five years from 1972 to 1976. The documents were discovered in the FBI files after a Freedom of Information Act search by Professor Jon Wiener, and published in Weiner's book Gimme Some Truth: The John Lennon FBI Files (2000). They are discussed in the documentary film, The U.S. vs. John Lennon (2006).

===== Labor and commerce =====
In November, along with fellow southerners James Eastland and Sam J. Ervin Jr., Thurmond was one of three senators to vote against an occupational safety bill that would establish a federal supervision to oversee working conditions. In December, Thurmond was one of thirty senators to sign a letter to the Interstate Commerce Commission charging the agency with imperiling rail transportation in the United States through ceasing to be a regulatory entity.

In March 1971, Thurmond introduced a bill that if enacted would authorize individuals who chose to continue working after the age of 65 to have the option of no longer paying Social Security taxes. Thurmond said, "A worker 65 or over who wishes to continue paying Social Security taxes in order to qualify for greater benefits in the future remains free to do so." In December, Thurmond delivered a Senate address predicting that Defense Secretary Melvin Laird would "propose one of the biggest defense budgets in history" during the following year.

In August 1977, Thurmond cosponsored legislation providing free prescription drugs to senior citizens with Massachusetts Senator Ted Kennedy. The bill would cover 24 million Americans over the age of 65 and was meant to augment the Medicare program with prescription drugs being paid for and given to individuals not hospitalized.

Senate sources reported in October 1979 that Ted Kennedy had asked Majority Leader Robert Byrd to bring the Illinois Brick bill to the floor, the controversial antitrust measure attracting the opposition of Thurmond, who joined Orrin Hatch in threatening a filibuster of the bill. In their stance against the bill, Thurmond and Hatch argued the bill's enactment would result in businesses being exposed to endless litigation as well as the possibility of duplicative awards of damages to direct and indirect purchasers.

===== Olympic Games =====
In September 1972, Thurmond and Democrat Mike Gravel introduced legislation intended to increase American fortune in future Olympic Games through the formation of a National Amateur Sports Foundation that would fund both sports facilities and training programs while developing greater cooperation among existing sports organizations. Thurmond stated that the proposed National Amateur Sports Foundation would "work with the present amateur athletic organizations but is in no way an attempt to supplant or assume control over these organizations" while granting "necessary coordination between the various existing organizations who so often in the past have worked at cross purposes."

In June 1973, the Senate Commerce Committee approved the Amateur Athletic Act of 1973, legislation that would form the United States Sports Board while ending the power struggle between the Amateur Athletic Union and the National Collegiate Athletic Association by having the board assume powers of both organizations and function as an independent federal agency that would be assigned with protecting the rights of athletes to participate. Thurmond staffers had joined with staffers of Senators James B. Pearson, Mike Gravel, and Marlow Cook in primarily writing the legislation.

===== Defense =====
In April 1972, when the Senate Armed Services Committee voted to end the Cheyenne helicopter project with a reduction of $450 million from the Pentagon's weapons programs, Thurmond was the sole Republican senator on the committee to oppose the move to terminate the project.

On June 2, 1973, Thurmond attended the launch of the USS L. Mendel Rivers (SSN-686), during which he stated that the Soviet Union was building three submarines for every one built by the U.S. and called for American submarine construction to be accelerated. At a July 1973 hearing, Thurmond suggested that the decision made by former Air Force Major Hal M. Knight to testify had to do with Knight's lack of advancement. Knight responded that he did not take an oath to support the military but instead the constitution.

In August 1974, the Senate Appropriations Committee approved a cut of nearly $5 billion in the Defense Department's budget for the current fiscal year, conflicting with President Ford. Thurmond expressed doubt on any major efforts to restore funds being undertaken by Ford administration supporters during the Senate floor debate.

In January 1977, Thurmond introduced a bill prohibiting American uniformed military forces having unionization, the measure earning the support of thirty-three senators. Thurmond wrote, "If military unions have proved irresponsible in other countries we can hardly permit them to be organized in the United States on the flimsy hypothesis that they may possibly be more responsible here."

===== Intelligence reform =====
During this period, the NSA reportedly had been eavesdropping on Thurmond's conversations, using the British part of the ECHELON project.

In January 1975, Thurmond was one of four senators to vote against the creation of a special committee to investigate the Central Intelligence Agency, Federal Bureau of Investigation, and other government agencies intended to either gather intelligence or enforce the law.

After President-elect Carter nominated Theodore C. Sorensen as his choice to become Director of the Central Intelligence Agency, Thurmond expressed reservations and fellow Senator Jake Garn said he believed Thurmond would not vote for the nomination. Sorensen withdrew from consideration days later, before a vote could be had.

In May, Thurmond made a joint appearance with President Carter in the Rose Garden in a show of bipartisan support for proposed foreign intelligence surveillance legislation. Thurmond stated he had become convinced the legislation was needed from his service on the Armed Services Committee, the Judiciary Committee and the Intelligence Committee the previous year and lauded the bill for concurrently protecting the rights of Americans, as a warrant would have to be obtained from a judge in order to fulfill any inquiries.

===== Energy and the environment =====
In July 1977 the Senate voted against terminating the Clinch River Breeder Reactor Project. Arguing in favor of the plant, Thurmond stated that Gulf Oil, Shell Oil, and Allied Chemical gathered "the best brains" in the U.S. to head the plant in anticipation of Gerald Ford's election, and questioned whether it was honorable to discontinue the plant simply because Ford had left office.

In March 1973, Thurmond was one of nine Republican senators to vote with the Democratic majority in favor of a measure demanding President Nixon to release the $120 million the Agriculture Department had not used toward water and rural area sewer systems.

In April 1973, Thurmond announced a $3 million grant and $700,000 loan from federal agencies for South Carolina with the Farmers Home Administration granting the loan to the Edgefield County Water and Sewer Authority to complete a rural system serving 2,906 residences in addition to businesses in surrounding areas.

In January 1976, the Senate voted in favor of expanding American fishing jurisdiction by 200 miles, a bill that Thurmond opposed. Thurmond was successful in implementing an amendment, which passed 93 to 2, postponing the date of its effect by a year. In consulting with President Ford by telephone, the latter confirmed to Thurmond that the added period brought about by his amendment would see him sign the bill in the interim.

In October 1976, Thurmond was informed of President Ford's intent to sign the Congaree National Park bill, authorizing the purchase of 15,200 acres of Beidler Tract. Thurmond said it would be "a great day for all those who have worked so long and hard to see that the Congaree forest will be saved."

==== Foreign policy ====
Throughout his entire political career, Thurmond's stance on foreign policy was characterized by his staunch opposition to communism.

===== Vietnam and the Far East =====
In a 1970 speech, Thurmond called on Japan to increase defense spending and take a larger role in resisting communism in Asia. Thurmond requested that Japan exercise restraints in textile exports to the U.S. and stated that he was in favor of trade between the US and Japan with the exception of instances of it closing American textile mills or when it caused textile workers to lose their jobs. He furthered that America intended to hold on to its prior commitments and that an address by President Nixon the previous year in which Nixon called for allies of Asia to play a larger role in their defense demonstrated American trust "in the capacities and growth of our allies." Thurmond also defended the Vietnam policy of the Nixon administration, saying that the president was making the best of the situation that he had inherited from Kennedy and Johnson while admitting he personally favored a total victory in the war.

On April 11, 1971, Thurmond called for the exoneration of William Calley following his conviction of participating in the My Lai Massacre, stating that the "victims at Mylai were casualties to the brutality of war" and Calley had acted off of order. Calley's petition for habeas corpus was granted three years later, in addition to his immediate release from house arrest.

In January 1975, Thurmond and William Scott toured South Vietnam, Thurmond receiving a medal from President of South Vietnam Nguyễn Văn Thiệu. The award was seen as part of an attempt by South Vietnam to court American congressional votes in its favor.

In 1971, Thurmond advocated against lifting the trade embargo on the People's Republic of China, stating that its communist regime had engaged in a propaganda effort to weaken support for the embargo. Nevertheless, days later, President Nixon ordered an end to the embargo.

===== The Panama Canal Zone =====
In 1974, Thurmond and Democrat John L. McClellan wrote a resolution to continue American sovereignty by the Panama Canal and zone. Thurmond stated that the rhetoric delivered by Secretary of State Henry Kissinger suggested that the "Canal Zone is already Panamanian territory and the only question involved is the transfer of jurisdiction." In the late 1970s, Thurmond advocated for forging a new relationship with Panama but against the U.S. giving up sovereignty to the Canal Zone. Thurmond doubted Panama's ability to govern alone: "There is no way that a Panarnaniain government could be objective about the administration of an enterprise so large in comparison to the rest of the national enterprise, public and private." In late August 1977, the New York Times wrote "President Carter can be grateful that the opposition to his compromise Panama treaty is now being led by Senator Strom Thurmond of South Carolina and Senator Jesse Helms of North Carolina." Speaking on the Panama Canal neutrality treaty, Thurmond said it was "the big giveaway of the century." The treaty was ratified by the Senate on March 16, 1978.

===== Soviet Union =====
In June 1974, Senator Henry M. Jackson informed Chairman of the Senate Armed Services Committee that he had arranged for Thurmond to cosponsor an amendment revising the present export control system and restricting trade with the Soviet Union while granting the Defense Secretary power to veto any export that might "significantly increase the military capability" of either the Soviet Union or other Communist countries. Jackson introduced the amendment after Howard M. Metzenbaum yielded the Senate floor before Majority Leader Mike Mansfield caught on to the proposal and succeeded in preventing an immediate vote.

In June 1975, as the Senate weighed a reduction in a $25 billion weapons procurement measure and to delete research funds to improve the accuracy and power of intercontinental ballistic missiles and warheads, Thurmond and Harry F. Byrd Jr. warned that the Soviet Union was attempting an increase on its missile accuracy and advocated for the United States to follow suit with its own missiles. Later that month, Thurmond and Jesse Helms wrote to President Ford requesting he meet with Aleksandr Solzhenitsyn ahead of a speech on June 30 during an AFL–CIO dinner. The White House responded that Ford was too busy to meet with Solzhenitsyn, while later sources indicate Ford declined the meeting at the counsel of his advisors.

In December 1979, Thurmond was one of ten senators on the Senate Armed Services Committee to sign a report urging President Carter Is to delay the vote on proposed treaty with between the US and Soviet Union to limit nuclear arms.

==== Judiciary ====
In January 1970, Thurmond asserted that he would work "to reverse the unreasonable and impractical decisions of the Supreme Court", as well as assist with the appointment of "sound judges" and uphold the Nixon administration's position for resumption of tax‐exempt status among all private schools. Thurmond urged Nixon to nominate another South Carolina Republican convert, Joseph O. Rogers Jr., to a federal judgeship; he had been the party's unsuccessful 1966 gubernatorial nominee against the Democrat Robert Evander McNair. At the time Rogers was the U.S. Attorney in South Carolina. When his judicial nomination dragged on, Rogers resigned as U.S. attorney and withdrew from consideration. He blamed the Nixon administration, which he and Thurmond had helped to bring to power, for failure to advance his nomination in the Senate because of opposition to the appointment from the NAACP.

In May 1971, a Thurmond spokesman confirmed that Thurmond had asked President Nixon to appoint Albert Watson to the United States Court of Military Appeals.

In October 1974, Thurmond was one of five senators to sponsor legislation authored by Jesse Helms permitting prayer in public schools and taking the issue away from the Supreme Court which had previously ruled in 1963 that school prayer violated the First Amendment to the United States Constitution through the establishment of a religion.

In January 1979, Ted Kennedy, in his new position as Senate Judiciary Committee chairman, terminated the blue slip system, which had previously allowed senators to veto prospective federal judgeship nominees from their own state. Nevada Senator Paul Laxalt read a statement from Thurmond in which the latter presumed "that the committee will honor the blue slip system that has worked so well in the past". In March 1979, the Carter administration made an appeal to Congress for new powers to aid with the enforcement of federal laws as it pertains to housing discrimination. Thurmond refused to back the administration as he charged it with "injecting itself in every facet of people's lives" and said housing disputes should be settled in court.

In July 1979, as the Senate weighed voting on the nomination of Assistant Attorney General Patricia M. Wald to the United States Court of Appeals in Washington, Thurmond joined Paul Laxalt and Alan Simpson recorded their opposition. Later that month, Thurmond asked Attorney General nominee Benjamin R. Civiletti if President Carter had made him give a pledge of loyalty or an assurance of complete independence. In September, the Senate Judiciary Committee approved 30 of President Carter's nominees, the closest vote being waged against Abner J. Mikva, who the president had nominated for the United States Court of Appeals for the District of Columbia. Thurmond was one of the five Republicans to vote against Mikva. In November, President Carter nominated José A. Cabranes to fill a vacancy on the United States District Court for the District of Connecticut. Thurmond submitted a series of written questions to Cabranes, whose answers were credited with clarifying his views on issues. Cabranes was confirmed for the position.

In July 1979, after the Carter administration unveiled a proposed governing charter for the FBI, Thurmond stated his support for its enactment, his backing being seen by the New York Times as an indication that the governing charter would face little conservative opposition.

In September 1979, the Senate approved Bailey Brown as Judge of the United States Court of Appeals for the Sixth Circuit. The nomination was one of the few votes in which Thurmond and Ted Kennedy joined forces in confirming and Thurmond supported an opinion by Kennedy on what the latter hoped would be the precedent for judicial nominees: "It is inadvisable for a nominee for a Federal judgeship to belong to a social club that engages in invidious discrimination." During the hearing, Kennedy had stated that he believed it would have been better for Brown to resign from the all-white club. Thurmond stated afterward that he understood the judge's feeling that a resignation would have been verification of his thirty-three years with the club being improper.

On October 10, President Carter signed the Federal Magistrate Act of 1979, an expansion of the jurisdiction of American magistrates in regards to civil and criminal cases. Carter noted Thurmond as one of the members of Congress who had shown leadership on the measure, without whose efforts it would have never passed. Senate sources reported in October that Ted Kennedy had asked Majority Leader Robert Byrd to bring the Illinois Brick bill to the floor, the controversial antitrust measure attracting the opposition of Thurmond, who joined Orrin Hatch in threatening a filibuster of the bill. In their stance against the bill, Thurmond and Hatch argued the bill's enactment would result in businesses being exposed to endless litigation as well as the possibility of duplicative awards of damages to direct and indirect purchasers.

==== Nixon's resignation ====
In July 1973, Thurmond was one of ten Republican senators in a group headed by Carl T. Curtis invited to the White House to reaffirm their support for President Nixon in light of recent scandals and criticism of the president within his own party. In October, President Nixon ordered the firing of independent special prosecutor Archibald Cox in an event that saw the resignations of Attorney General Elliot Richardson and Deputy Attorney General William Ruckelshaus before Robert Bork fulfilled the president's order. The day after the firing, Democrat Birch Bayh charged Thurmond with "browbeating" Cox during Senate Judiciary Committee hearings on the firing. Thurmond replied that Bayh was "below a snake" in the event that he had intended to impugn his motives. Thurmond was noted for joining Edward J. Gurney in questioning Cox "at length in an attempt to show that he was biased against" Nixon and his administration. Thurmond asked Cox if eleven members of his staff had worked for Presidents Kennedy and Johnson and was interrupted multiple times by James Eastland to allow for Cox to fully answer questions.

In May 1974, the House Judiciary Committee opened impeachment hearings against President Nixon after the release of 1,200 pages of transcripts of White House conversations between him and his aides and the administration became engulfed in the scandal that would come to be known as Watergate. Thurmond, along with William L. Scott and James B. Allen agreed with Senator Carl T. Curtis on the equation of resignation with mob rule and the group declined defending Nixon's conduct. Thurmond opined that Nixon was "the only President we have" and questioned why Congress would want to weaken his hand in negotiating with other countries. In August, Newsweek published a list by the White House including Thurmond as one of thirty-six senators that the administration believed would support President Nixon in the event of his impeachment and being brought to trial by the Senate. The article stated that some supporters were not fully convinced and this would further peril the administration as 34 needed to prevent conviction. Nixon resigned on August 9 in light of near-certain impeachment.

== Sixth term (1979–1985) ==
In his general election campaign, Thurmond faced Charles Ravenel, a local banker and former gubernatorial candidate. Ravenel charged Thurmond with not standing up for South Carolina's educational needs and having been behind the lack of funding. Thurmond responded to the charges by stating that he thought the state had made advancements in its education system. Thurmond and Ravenel made a joint appearance in April, where Thurmond discussed his position on a variety of issues.

The higher amount of African-Americans voting in elections was taken into account by the Ravenel campaign, which sought to gain this group of voters by reviving interest in older statements by Thurmond. In his courting of black voters, Thurmond was noted to have not undergone "any ideological transformation" but instead devoted himself to making personal contact with members of the minority group. Thurmond's influence in national politics allowed him to have correspondence with staffers from the Nixon administration which gave him "a unique advantage in announcing federal grants and bird-dogging federal projects of particular interest to black voters."

By May 1978, Thurmond held a 30-point lead over Ravenel among double digits of undecided voters. Thurmond won a sixth term with 351,733 votes to Ravenel's 281,119. The race would later be assessed as the last serious challenge to Thurmond during his career.

=== 1980 presidential election ===
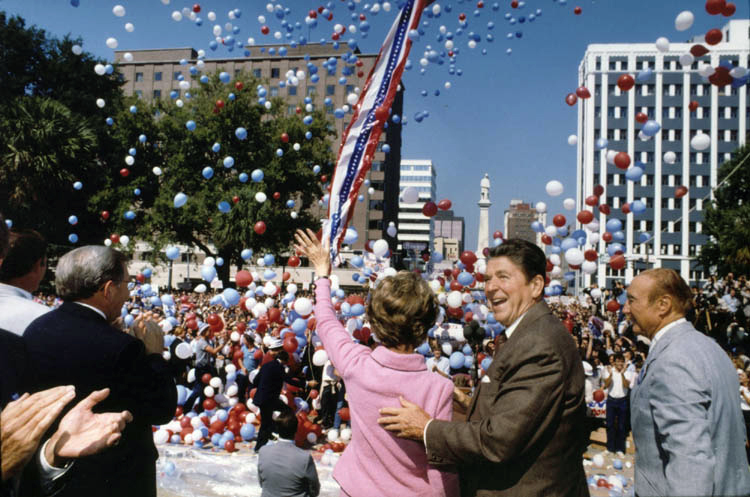
Thurmond (far right) campaigning for Ronald Reagan in Columbia, South Carolina in 1980

Thurmond endorsed the presidential candidacy of John Connally, on December 27, 1979. The Republican election cycle that year also featured Reagan, Thurmond explaining that he had chosen to back Connally this time around because of the latter's wide government experience which he believed would benefit the U.S. in both domestic and foreign matters. Thurmond stated that the Iran hostage crisis would have never happened were Connally the sitting president as Iranians were familiar with his strength. The Washington Post noted Thurmond seeming "to cast himself for a role of regional leadership in the Connally campaign similar to the one he played in 1968" for the Nixon campaign. Connally subsequently was defeated in the South Carolina primary by Reagan, thanking Thurmond and his wife for doing more to support his campaign in the state than anyone else. In August 1980, Thurmond gave a "tense cross examination" of Billy Carter, the brother of President Carter who had come under scrutiny for his relationship with Libya and receiving funds from the country. The Billy Carter controversy also was favored by Democrats wishing to replace Carter as the party's nominee in the general election. Thurmond questioned Carter over his prior refusal to disclose the amount of funds he had received from public appearances following the 1976 election of his brother as president, and stated his skepticism with some of the points made.

During a November 6, 1980 press conference, days after the 1980 Senate election, in which the Republicans unexpectedly won a majority, Thurmond pledged that he would seek a death penalty law. During an interview the following year, Thurmond said, "I am convinced the death penalty is a deterrent to crime. I had to sentence four people to the electric chair. I did not make the decision; the jury made it. It was my duty to pass sentence, because the jury had found them guilty and did not recommend mercy. But if I had been on the jury, I would have arrived at the same decision; in all four of those cases." After the presidential election, Thurmond and Helms sponsored a Senate amendment to a Department of Justice appropriations bill denying the department the power to participate in busing, due to objections over federal involvement, but, although passed by Congress, was vetoed by a lame duck Carter. In December 1980, Thurmond met with President-elect Reagan and recommended former South Carolina governor James B. Edwards for United States Secretary of Energy in the incoming administration. Reagan later named Edwards Energy Secretary, and the latter served in that position for over a year. In early January 1981, the Justice Department revealed it was carrying out a suit against Charleston County for school officials declining to propose a desegregation method for its public schools. Thurmond responded by noting that South Carolina did not support President Carter in the general election and stating that this may have contributed to the Justice Department's decision. On January 11, Thurmond stated that he would ask the incoming Reagan administration to look into the facts of the case before proceeding.

=== Reagan administration ===
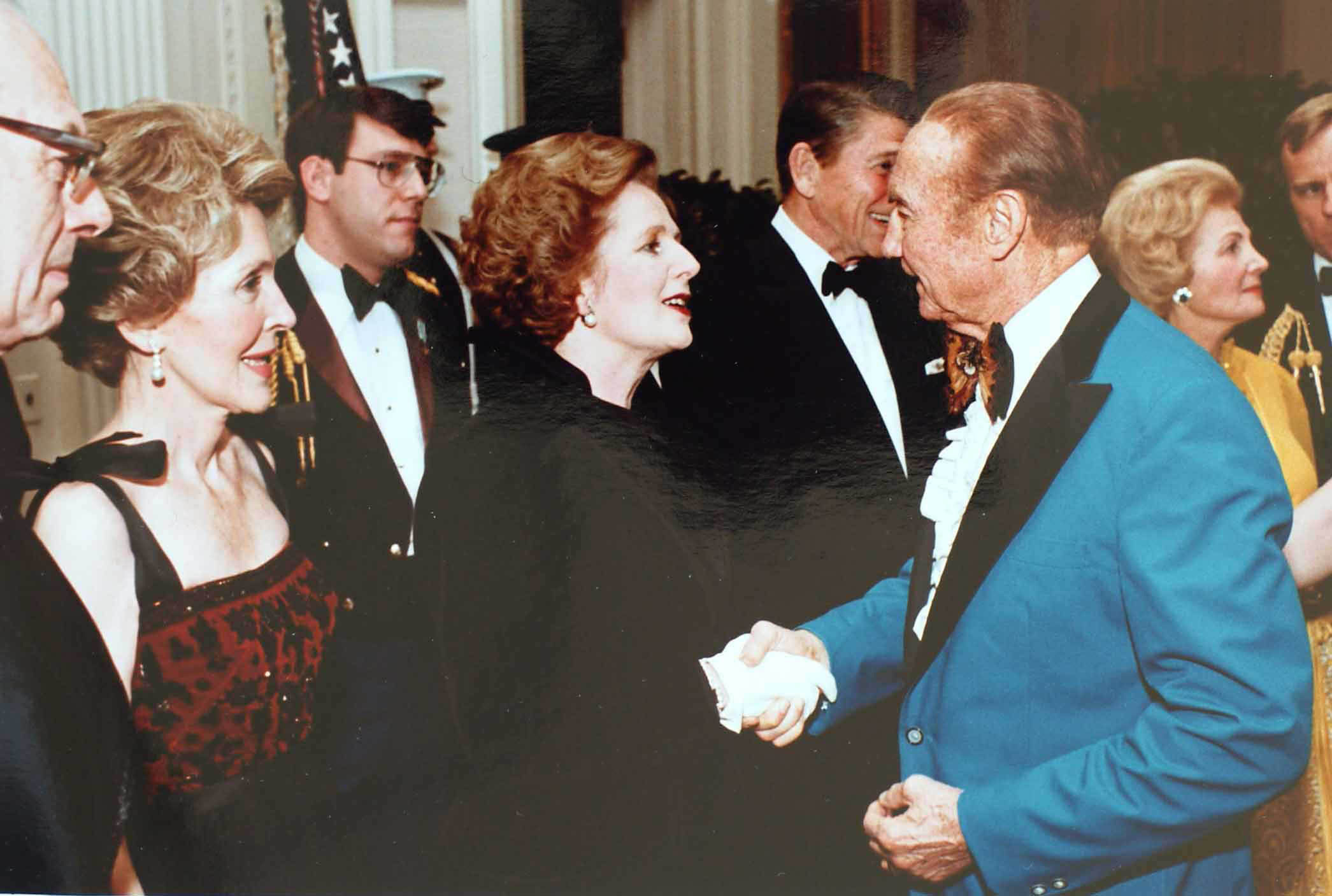
Margaret Thatcher and Thurmond at a state dinner in 1981

In 1970, African-Americans constituted about 30 percent of South Carolina's population. After the Voting Rights Act of 1965, African Americans were legally protected in exercising their constitutional rights to register and vote in South Carolina.

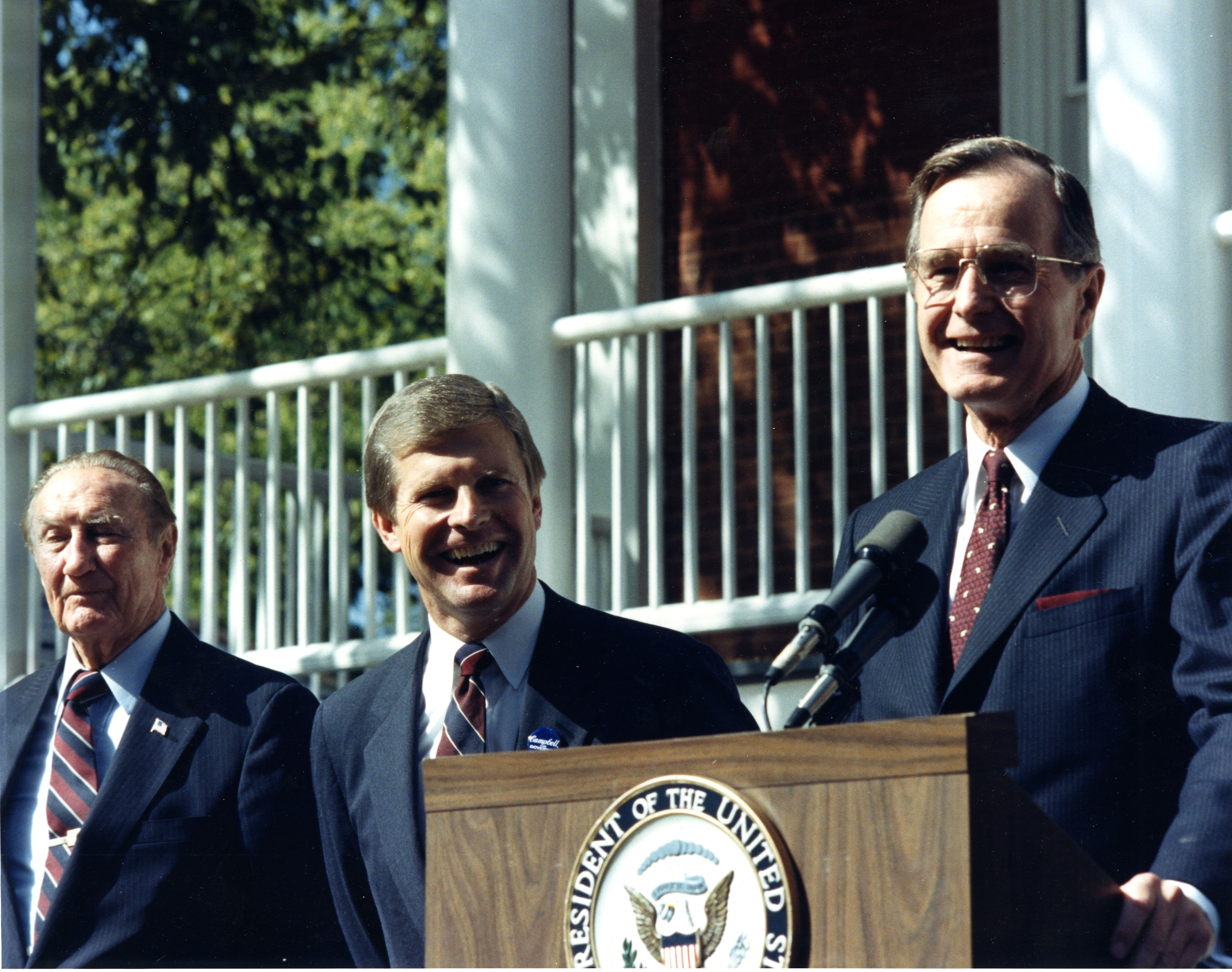
Thurmond and Vice President George H. W. Bush at a 1986 gubernatorial campaign rally for Representative Carroll A. Campbell Jr.

Thurmond appointed Thomas Moss, an African American, to his Senate staff in 1971. It has been described as the first such appointment by a member of the South Carolina congressional delegation (it was incorrectly reported by many sources as the first senatorial appointment of an African American, but Mississippi Senator Pat Harrison had hired clerk-librarian Jesse Nichols in 1937). In 1983, Thurmond supported legislation to make the birthday of Martin Luther King Jr. a federal holiday. In South Carolina, the honor was diluted; until 2000 the state offered employees the option to celebrate this holiday or substitute one of three Confederate holidays instead. Despite this, Thurmond never explicitly renounced his earlier views on racial segregation.

Thurmond became President pro tempore of the U.S. Senate in 1981, and was part of the U.S. delegation to the funeral of Egyptian President Anwar Sadat, Thurmond being accompanied by Sadat's pen pal Sam Brown.

In January 1982, Thurmond and Vice President George H. W. Bush were met with protestors while Thurmond was being inducted into the South Carolina Hall of Fame, the protestors holding signs charging Thurmond with racism and attacking the Voting Rights Act.

In the 1984 presidential election, Thurmond was cited along with Carroll Campbell and South Carolina Republican Party Director Warren Tompkins by Republicans as the forces binding the Reagan-Bush ticket to South Carolina's electoral votes. Thurmond attended President Reagan's October 15 re-election campaign speech in the Allied Health Building on the Greenville Technical College campus in Greenville, South Carolina.

In June 1986, Thurmond sent a letter to Attorney General Edwin Meese requesting "an inquiry into the activities of former Commerce Department official Walter Lenahan, and expressed concern about an alleged leak of U.S. trade information to textile-exporting nations."

In January 1987, Thurmond swore in Carroll A. Campbell Jr. as the 112th Governor of South Carolina.

On February 23, 1988, Thurmond endorsed fellow senator Bob Dole in the Republican presidential primary, acknowledging his previous intent to remain neutral during the nominating process. The Thurmond endorsement served to change the Dole campaign's initial plans of skipping the South Carolina primary, where Vice President Bush defeated Dole. The Bush campaign subsequently won other Southern states and the nomination, leading Michael Oreskes to reflect that Dole "was hurt by an endorsement that led him astray."

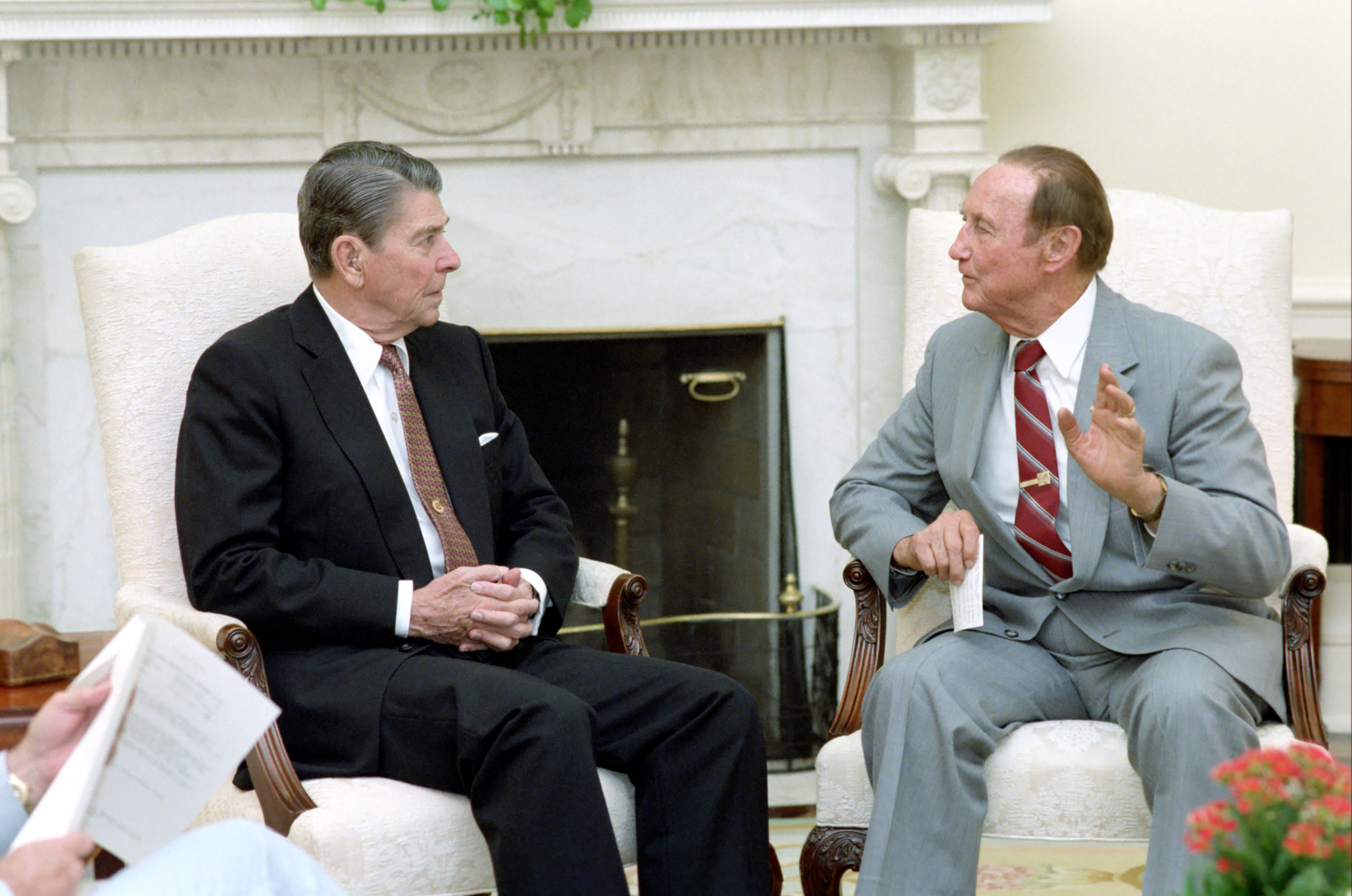
President Ronald Reagan with Thurmond in the Oval Office in 1987

In August 1988, as the Senate voted on the nomination of Dick Thornburgh as U.S. Attorney General, Thurmond stated that Thornburgh had the qualities necessary for an Attorney General to possess, citing his "integrity, honesty, professionalism and independence." Thornburgh was confirmed, and served for the remainder of the Reagan administration as well as the Bush administration.

Following the 1988 Presidential election, George H. W. Bush nominated John Tower for United States Secretary of Defense. After Tower's nomination was rejected by the Senate, Thurmond asked, "What does it say when the leader of the free world can't get a Cabinet member confirmed?"

In August 1989, the Senate Judiciary Committee voted evenly on the nomination of William C. Lucas for Assist Attorney General for Civil Rights, terminating the nomination that required a majority to proceed to the entirety of the chamber. Among his support, Thurmond noted that Lucas was a minority, and reflected on their lack of opportunities in years prior, adding, "I know down South they didn't and up North either. We had de jure segregation and up North you had de facto segregation. There was segregation in both places, and black people didn't have the chance in either place that they should have had. Now's the chance to give them a chance." Chairman of the Senate Judiciary Committee Joe Biden refuted Thurmond's argument by mentioning that Senate critics of Lucas were civil rights supporters who had a problem with his lack of qualifications.

In September 1989, Hurricane Hugo hit the Southeast United States, causing twenty-seven deaths in South Carolina. In response, Congress approved a $1.1 billion emergency aid package for victims of the hurricane in what was the largest disaster relief package in American history. Before the vote, Thurmond said of the hurricane, "I have never seen so much damage in my life. It looked like there had been a war there. We need all the help we can get." Thurmond accompanied President Bush aboard Air Force One when he visited the state at the end of the month, and revealed that Bush had written a check of $1,000 to South Carolina Red Cross as a showing of personal support for those affected.

==== Domestic policy ====
In 1980, Thurmond and Democratic Representative John Conyers jointly sponsored a constitutional amendment to change the tenure of the President to a single six-year term.

At the beginning of 1981, Thurmond as the new chairman of the Senate Judiciary Committee and President Reagan were seen as obstacles to any gun laws passing in the Senate. Thurmond publicly stated his belief that any measures introduced would be defeated in his committee. After the March assassination attempt on President Reagan, which ushered in bipartisan support for "legislation that would ban the importing of unassembled gun parts involved in the manufacture of cheap pistols often used by criminals", Thurmond stated his support for legislation imposing a ban on the gun components on a seven-point anti-crime program. He indicated his backing would only be in favor of passing measures to restrict criminals accessing guns, telling reporters, "I still think criminals are going to get guns. But if you take guns away from people who need them to protect their homes, that is unreasonable." Thurmond's announcement indicating his support for gun control legislation in the wake of the assassination attempt was seen as possibly indicating a change in the debate of regulations relating to firearms in the U.S. He announced plans to hold hearings on the seven-point proposal intended to address the questions surrounding the Reagan assassination attempt. In July 1989, when the Senate Judiciary Committee approved a bill by Democrat Dennis DeConcini that imposed a ban of three years on sales of several domestic assault rifles, it rejected an amendment by Thurmond that would have substituted the DeConcini bill with the Bush administration's anti-crime package, which did not include a ban on rifles produced in the United States. Failure to implement the Thurmond amendment was seen as "a preliminary test of Senate support for extending President Bush's ban on foreign-made assault weapons to domestic makes" and a loss for the National Rifle Association of America which had previously protested banning domestic assault rifles. Following the vote, Thurmond and NRA officials pledged to bring the same issue up before the full chamber.

In early 1981, Thurmond stated his support for a balanced budget amendment as he believed Reagan's successor would unbalance the budget in spite of what Reagan did while in office. He added that there was not a timetable for getting it passed and that Congress was ahead of the newly formed Reagan administration. Thurmond attended the July 12, 1982 Rose Garden speech by President Reagan on the balanced budget amendment. President Reagan stated the administration was "asking Majority Leader Baker, Senators Thurmond, Hatch, DeConcini, and Helms, as leaders of the 61 cosponsors, to help us secure its passage as rapidly as possible." On August 4, 1982, the Senate approved adopting a constitutional amendment requiring a balanced budget in the following years. Following the vote, Thurmond said, "This is a great day for America. We feel this is a step that will turn this country around, once it is ratified by the states." On January 26, 1983, a constitutional amendment mandating a balanced budget was introduced to the Senate, Thurmond and Utah Senator Orrin Hatch serving as its main cosponsors. Thurmond's remarks included calling for a haste to its enactment: "Congress has shown it is unable to control federal spending and, in doing so, has conceded it must be forced to do so. That is why this amendment is so urgently needed." In October 1985, Thurmond supported a plan to require a balanced budget by 1991.

Throughout early 1981, Thurmond and Helms urged President Reagan to curb textile imports, with Thurmond saying later that year that the first four months of 1981 had seen a 16 percent increase in textile imports "over a similar period in 1980." That year, President Reagan pledged in a letter to Thurmond to help South Carolina textile mills against their foreign competitors. The letter was pulled out by Chief of Staff James Baker during a December 1983 White House Cabinet Council on Commerce and Trade meeting, and was credited by two White House aides with ending "the council debate cold." President Reagan stated his support for tightening control of textile imports in December 1983. In December 1984, President Reagan vetoed H.R. 1562, Thurmond responded to the decision by stating that Reagan had heeded bad advice and predicted the veto would produce "more layoffs, more plant shutdowns and more long-term economic damage to an industry that is crucial to this nation."

In June 1981, Thurmond stated that MX missiles could potentially disrupt southwest lifestyles and called for a "reassessment of the country's commitment to a joint land, sea and air-based ballistic missile deterrent." Thurmond believed billions of dollars could potentially be saved in the event that military experts look into the sea-based missiles and the missiles would be less likely to attack if not based on land. In 1983, Thurmond supported legislation for the MX missile, voting for its development being funded by $625 million in May, and against the Gary Hart amendment that if enacted would have removed production for the missile from the military authorization bill of 1984 two months later.

In July 1981, Thurmond sent Attorney General William French Smith a twelve-person list of candidates to be considered for federal district judgeship.

The year of 1981 also saw the Voting Rights Act come up for another extension. Thurmond was one of the leaders in opposition to portions of the act, and said parts of the law were discriminatory toward states' rights as well as too strict toward communities that had adhered to it in the past.

On March 11, 1982, Thurmond voted in favor of a measure sponsored by Senator Orrin Hatch that sought to reverse Roe v. Wade and allow Congress and individual states to adopt laws banning abortions. Its passage was the first time a congressional committee supported an anti-abortion amendment.

In July 1982, the House and Senate overrode President Reagan's veto of copyright legislation intended to retain employment in the American printing and publishing industries. Thurmond stated he could not understand President Reagan's authorization of recommendation on the part of what he called "middle-level bureaucrats" and how he could take advice from members of the aforementioned group amid a Labor Department report on the thousands of jobs that would be lost without the bill. Thurmond added that the legislation would retain "jobs for Americans", a rebuff of claims to the contrary on the part of Reagan.

In 1983, the National Taxpayers Union, a conservative group that bestowed points to politicians who voted for measures to reduce federal spending, gave Thurmond a 58 percent spending score, three points down from his rating two years prior.

In 1984, the Senate voted on a bill granting federal prosecution to weapon-carrying career robbers and giving 15 years of incarceration to those convicted. Along with Senator Ted Kennedy, Thurmond sponsored an amendment limiting the bill to third-time federal offenders. The amendment passed 77 to 12, and was sent to the House.

In June 1985, Thurmond introduced legislation providing stiffer federal penalties for individuals and financial institutions engaged in laundering money earned from activities of illegality. The bill, supported by the Reagan administration as it sought to expose the financial activities of criminals, was hailed by Thurmond as "an important step in our continuing war on organized crime and those financial institutions and individuals which hide the ill-gotten assets of law-breakers, especially drug traffickers." American Bar Association, American Bankers Association and American Civil Liberties Union officials charged the proposal with largely removing privacy laws imposed by the federal government and state governments that were established to prevent unchecked examinations of the bank records of individuals from authorities.

In 1988, Thurmond introduced an amendment to a bill by Chris Dodd calling for granting unpaid leaves for workers with either a newborn, newly adopted, or seriously ill child. The amendment called for severe penalties to individuals involved in the selling, transferring of control or buying of a child that could be used in pornography. Thurmond forced a vote and the amendment passed 97 to 0.

In October 1989, as the Senate approved a bill that made burning of the American flag a federal crime in an attempt to counter a Supreme Court ruling asserting that flag-burning was protected by the First Amendment, Thurmond opined that securing flag burning as a federal crime through a constitutional amendment was "the only sure and foolproof way to protect the integrity of the American flag".

==== Anti-crime and drug policies ====
In May 1982, Thurmond introduced anti-crime legislation that included provisions altering the bail system to allow a judge to deny bond to defendants the judge considered a danger to society along a "presumption" that defendants charged with drug trafficking or the use of a weapon in a violent crime are a danger to the community in addition to imposing fines and penalties for individuals convicted of dealing "large amounts of the most dangerous drugs." Under the legislation, the acts of killing, kidnapping or assaulting certain White House officials, Cabinet members of Supreme Court justices would be made federal crimes and witnesses and victims would be granted protection during and following a federal trial. The measure was considered a last-ditch effort to push a crime bill through Congress by the end of the year and the White House responded with praise of the legislation as containing "several statutory reforms that are long overdue" within hours of Thurmond unveiling it. Thurmond referred to the measure as a "big step toward controlling the number one threat to organized society – crime."

In 1983, Thurmond served as a sponsor of an anti-crime bill that included a measure that would form a Cabinet-level post to oversee drug investigations. President Reagan pocket vetoed the bill on the grounds that it would have created "another layer of bureaucracy" in attempts to combat narcotics. Though saying he was not angered by the president's opposition, Thurmond admitted Reagan's approval would have been a better alternative and called on the newly commenced 98th United States Congress to compose anti-crime legislation that the administration would support.

In September 1986, Thurmond sponsored a drug law package that included a provision imposing the death penalty for some drug offenses and federal crimes of "treason, espionage and killing American hostages in a terrorist attack"; it followed another measure passed in the House authorizing introduction of certain evidence in drug-related cases that was seized illegally, and increased the difficulty for criminal defendants to use writs of habeas corpus. The legislation omitted a provision of the House bill that granted American military personnel the authority to arrest individuals in drug-trafficking cases, and the legislation's other sponsors conceded that it would provoke a filibuster and possibly need revising in light of opposition to its more controversial proposals. A week later, the Senate opened debate on proposals aimed at ending both the supply of dangerous drugs as well as their demand. Thurmond offered changes to criminal law in the form of amendments that would include imposing the death penalty for drug traffickers guilty of murder and an expansion of the proposal that would add the death penalty for other federal crimes, such as espionage and hostage taking. Thurmond additionally favored altering rules of evidence so that evidence gathered illegally would not be removed from criminal proceedings if it was obtained in "good faith". President Reagan signed the Anti-Drug Abuse Act of 1986 on October 27, 1986, noting Thurmond as one of the "real champions in the battle to get this legislation through Congress".

In November 1987, Thurmond introduced legislation that if enacted would require "alcoholic beverages to carry health warning labels similar to those on cigarettes", saying the legislation would be effective if it prevented anyone from drinking while being in a compromising position of health. The following year, Thurmond sponsored legislation designed to impose "five rotating warning labels on alcoholic beverages cautioning pregnant women not to drink, warning that alcohol is addictive and can increase the risks of hypertension, liver disease and cancer, that it impairs a person's ability to drive a car or operate machinery, and that alcohol consumption can be hazardous in combination with some drugs."

In September 1989, Thurmond was one of nine Republican senators appointed by Senate Republican leader Robert Dole to negotiate a dispute with Democrats over financing of President Bush's anti-drug plan that called for spending $7.8 billion by the following year as part of the president's efforts to address narcotics nationwide and abroad.

==== Judicial nominees ====
In late 1981, Thurmond presided over the hearings of Sandra Day O'Connor, who President Reagan had nominated for associate justice. Thurmond granted Alabama Senator Jeremiah Denton an hour of questioning of O'Connor, twice the time allotted for other members of the chamber. Thurmond stated that O'Connor was "one of the choice nominees" for the Supreme Court that he had seen in all of his Senate career, furthering that she had all the qualities he believed "a judge needs." O'Connor was confirmed by the Senate.

In November 1982, President Reagan selected Harry N. Walters as his choice for Administrator of Veterans Affairs; Thurmond and Wyoming senator Alan Simpson were both critical of the president's lack of consultation with them prior to the announcement. Thurmond shortly afterward stated publicly his support for Walters, citing him as having "the education and experience to fill the position". Walters was confirmed for the position.

In January 1984, President Reagan nominated of Edwin Meese for U.S. Attorney General to replace the resigning William French Smith. Meese agreed for a second round of questioning from the Senate Judiciary Committee, which Thurmond felt "would be productive all the way around" to have another appearance by the nominee. At a news conference that month, Thurmond stated a lack of evident wrongdoing and his confidence in Meese stemming from Reagan having selected him: "Up to now, there's been nothing I've come across that would damage Mr. Meese. If President Reagan nominated the man, then he must be qualified." Meese was later confirmed by the Senate in February 1985. In May 1988, after Meese dismissed spokesman Terry Eastland, Thurmond stated that Eastland's reputation was fine and that he had concern toward the latest developments, adding "his voice to those of Republican lawmakers who have said they were increasingly concerned over the operations of the Justice Department under" Meese.

In November 1985, after President Reagan nominated Alex Kozinski to the United States Court of Appeals for the Ninth Circuit, Thurmond assailed a day-long questioning of Kozinski by Democratic members of the Senate as "the puniest, most nit-picking charges" he had heard from members of that ideology in all of his time in Congress and called Kozinski "a man of integrity and dedication, with a magnificent record".

In March 1986, Daniel Anthony Manion, President Reagan's choice for the U.S. Court of Appeals in Chicago, answered a question by Thurmond at the beginning of a session before a Senate panel. Three months later, Thurmond called for a bipartisan vote for cloture, citing Manion as "entitled to have a vote by the Senate", and predicted there were enough votes to confirm him.

In August 1986, after President Reagan nominated Associate Justice William Rehnquist for Chief Justice of the United States, Thurmond said the questions poised toward Rehnquist during his confirmation hearings were disgraceful as well as part of an attempt to smear him. As a member of the Senate Judiciary Committee, Thurmond voted in favor of recommending Rehnquist's confirmation. Thurmond defended Rehnquist against charges of discrimination, saying the nomination would never have been approved by the Senate Judiciary Committee if its members felt any credibility to the claims.

In July 1987, President Reagan nominated Robert Bork as Associate Justice on the Supreme Court. The Los Angeles Times noted Thurmond as "one of Bork's key supporters on the Judiciary Committee." In October, after the Senate rejected Bork's nomination, Thurmond stated during a news conference that President Reagan's next nominee should be a person not "as controversial" and concurrently praised Bork as "a great judge who would have adorned the Supreme Court with honor." Thurmond also expressed his view that the next Supreme Court nominee should be someone from the South.

==== Foreign policy ====
In April 1981, Thurmond stated that the U.S. could move some of its West Germany soldiers to the East German and Czechoslovak borders in an attempt to improve both morale and combat readiness.

In October 1983, Thurmond stated his support for the United States invasion of Grenada, saying American efforts with other countries were "providing an opportunity for Grenadan citizens to regain control over their lives" and the U.S. would be forced to watch centuries of progress crumble if the country was unwilling to make sacrifices. Thurmond voted against the Senate resolution declaring that American troops in Grenada would be "withdrawn no more than 60 days later unless Congress authorized their continued presence there". President Reagan sent Thurmond a letter containing a report in line with the War Powers Resolution. Thurmond said the "ruling junta in Grenada" was directly threatening American lives.

In December 1984, as the United States and Israel moved to negotiate a free-trade pact where tariffs between the two countries would eventually be wiped out following the Reagan administration receiving congressional approval to negotiate such an agreement, Thurmond wrote a letter to United States trade representative Bill Brock calling on Brock to "reformulate" the negotiating position of the US as the senator had been informed by his aides that the American position in the negotiation was "more generous" than the one specified to Congress. Brock replied to Thurmond weeks later, asserting that he had "every intention" of fulfilling his commitment to Congress "to take account of the import sensitivity of specific products" in the agreement and that Israel had acknowledged the irregularity of export subsidy programs "with the concept of a free-trade area."

In September 1985, Thurmond was one of eight members of a delegation that met with General Secretary of the Communist Party of the Soviet Union Mikhail Gorbachev. The delegation agreed on viewing Gorbachev as an impressive leader and that he had refused any discussion of human rights issues and repeated Soviet formulas in a response to Afghanistan questions.

In March 1986, after American warplanes took action against Libyan land, Thurmond stated the U.S. "has the right and the duty to protect and defend itself when attacked, as it was today, without provocation." He opposed statements by the Libyan government that the attacks on U.S. ships occurred in international waters and named Muammar Gaddafi as the individual who had orchestrated the acts of aggression toward the U.S.

Thurmond was a supporter of the Nicaragua rebels, saying that support for the group on the part of the United States was central to furthering America's view "in freedom and in protecting ourselves against Soviet totalitarianism." In August 1988, Senator Robert Byrd presented the White House with a modified version of the Democratic proposal on Contra aid. Thurmond responded to the plan by calling it unsatisfactory.

In 1988, some members of the Senate gave support to a law that would impose American participation in an international treaty outlawing genocide. Thurmond stated his intent to add a death penalty amendment in the event the bill reached the Senate floor, the maximum punishment of the bill in the United States being incarceration and Thurmond's measure conflicting with the anti-death penalty views of the bill's leading advocates. Democrats charged Thurmond with using parliamentary devices and Senate traditions to prevent a vote. Thurmond dropped the death penalty amendment when Democrats agreed to proceed with the confirmation of Republican judges. Several Democrats espoused the view that Thurmond had only been adamant in including the death penalty amendment to get something out of the Senate Democrats during the debate over the treaty.

== Seventh term (1985–1991) ==
In September 1983, President Reagan attended a fundraising dinner for Thurmond's re-election campaign in the Cantey Building at the South Carolina State Fairgrounds in Columbia, South Carolina. Reagan delivered an address both praising Thurmond and noting the similarities in his views and that of the administration.

Running for a fifth full term in 1984, Thurmond faced his first primary challenge in 20 years, from retired CIA agent Robert Cunningham, and won the Republican nomination on June 12, 1984. Cunningham charged Thurmond with being a follower who no one could validate the seriousness of as a candidate since he had not been challenged in eighteen years, furthering that the South Carolina Republican Party had been involved with the decline in his opposition. Cunningham said that Thurmond had a "bad track record" and noted his past comments on race, saying that he would not be crushed like Thurmond's past opponents and was getting much encouragement in his bid to unseat him.

Thurmond addressed the issue of age during the primary, the 81-year-old senator stating that he exercised each day for an hour and a half and that he was in the same shape as a person in their 30s or 40s. Cunningham received less than 6% of the primary vote. Thurmond then defeated Melvin Purvis III in the general election, the latter receiving half of the votes cast for Thurmond. Purvis, noted to have few differences in ideology with Thurmond, cited the latter's age as reason to retire him from the Senate.

In 1986, President Reagan nominated Antonin Scalia for Associate Justice to replace William Rehnquist as the latter ascended to Chief Justice of the United States following the retirement of Warren E. Burger. During the hearings held in July, Thurmond questioned Scalia on his view of the Supreme Court's ruling in Miranda v. Arizona, that both inculpatory and exculpatory statements made in response to interrogation by a defendant in police custody would be admissible at trial only if the prosecution can show that the defendant was informed of the right to consult with an attorney before and during questioning and of the right against self-incrimination before police questioning, and that the defendant not only understood these rights, but voluntarily waived them. Scalia told Thurmond, "As a policy matter, I think – as far as I know everybody thinks – it's a good idea to warn a suspect what his rights are as soon as practicable."

In early 1990, Thurmond sponsored a crime bill concurrent with another measure of the same intent, his version receiving the support of President Bush. Thurmond charged the Democratic proposal with aiding criminals and furthering the loss of rights on the part of victims. In June, the bill was nearly doomed following a procedural vote that forced Senate leaders to work toward modifying its provisions. Thurmond proposed that his fellow senators accept portions of the bill that the Senate had already passed including provisions expanding the number of federal crimes for which the death penalty could apply from 23 to 30 and restrictions on the number of appeals a condemned inmate may file in Federal courts, and the ban on the sale and manufacture of nine types of semiautomatic weapons. Thurmond additionally called for the Senate to oversee a limited number of amendments on outstanding issues in the crime package like the proposal to allow evidence gathered with an improper warrant to be used in trials and the Department of Justice being reorganized. In 1992, the Senate voted on an anti-crime bill, Thurmond predicting that it would not pass due to what he considered its lack of strength: "This weak bill expands the rights of criminals. It is a fraud. It is a sham." He stated that President Bush had told him in advance of his intent to veto the bill if it passed.

In March 1990, Thurmond endorsed reducing the number of ways applicants to jobs needed to submit to verify they were legal citizens, as various forms were required to be submitted by all applicants under the Immigration Reform and Control Act.

Thurmond joined the minority of Republicans who voted for the Brady Bill for gun control in 1993. He voted against the Federal Assault Weapons Ban in 1994.

Thurmond stumped for President Bush during the 1992 South Carolina Republican primary. In early 1992, Thurmond stated his intent to become the top Republican on the Senate Armed Services Committee, replacing John Warner. He traced his ambitions for the post to an interest in maintaining a strong defense as well as welfare for "the men and women who serve our nation so well." In October 1992, Hollings stated that Thurmond would learn, in the event of his retirement, that he did not have "a home, a hometown, and would quickly discover he doesn't have any real friends." The comment caused Representative Tommy Hartnett to rebuke Hollings, demanding that he apologize for insulting Thurmond.

In June 1993, after the Defense Base Closure and Realignment Commission voted to close the Navy base and naval shipyard in Charleston, South Carolina, Thurmond said the decision was "probably the worst disaster that's happened to Charleston in my lifetime", citing that the people of Charleston had stood by the Navy more than any others in the world, and called the decision worse than Hurricane Hugo.

In June 1993, President Clinton nominated Ruth Bader Ginsburg for Associate Justice to replace the retiring Byron White. Thurmond had been the only member of the Senate Judiciary Committee to vote against Ginsburg in 1980, prior to her confirmation as Judge of the United States Court of Appeals for the District of Columbia Circuit. Thurmond listed concerns about Ginsburg as it pertained to her views on abortion and the death penalty, though he voted to support her, calling Ginsburg "a person of integrity".

== Eighth term (1991–1997) ==
Thurmond launched his campaign for an eighth term on February 12, 1990, citing that he had never before felt "a stronger obligation to continue my work for the future of our state and our nation." Thurmond, then age 87, billed himself as having the health of a man in his fifties. The South Carolina Democratic Party faced difficulty recruiting a candidate which they believed had a chance of defeating Thurmond.

In the general election, Thurmond defeated retired intelligence officer Bob Cunningham, who had been his Republican primary opponent in 1984. (Cunningham had switched parties in 1990.)

=== Clarence Thomas nomination ===
President George H. W. Bush nominated Clarence Thomas for Associate Justice on the Supreme Court to replace the retiring Thurgood Marshall. In a visit with Thurmond, Thomas stated that he had been fortunate as a result of the Civil Rights Movement assisting him in getting out of poverty, a departure from his previous position of African-Americans achieving success through hard work and individual initiative. The New York Times observed, "Judge Thomas's remarks in Mr. Thurmond's office were not in response to reporters' specific questions and were clearly intended to rebut critics, including some by members of civil rights organizations, who say he should not be confirmed because of his vociferous opposition to affirmative action and racial quotas in hiring." In September, as Thomas appeared before the Senate Judiciary Committee, Thurmond interrupted a line of questioning by Howard Metzenbaum to defend Thomas against a complaint that Thomas had answered questions about cases except for abortion, with the assumption that it would harm his nomination's appeal to supporters of Roe v. Wade. Thurmond voted for Thomas's confirmation, and the latter was confirmed by the Senate in October 1991.

=== Chairman of the Senate Armed Services Committee ===
Following the 1994 Republican Revolution, in which the Republican Party gained eight seats in the Senate and gained a majority in both chambers, Senator Bob Dole stated that Thurmond would head the Armed Services Committee. In December, after President Clinton's announcement that he would seek a $25 billion increase in defense spending over the following six years, Thurmond called it a correct move but one which validated claims that the president had hastily cut the Pentagon budget.

In February 1995, during an interview, Thurmond stated that he had survived "a little power play" orchestrated by fellow Republicans, enabling him to continue serving as Senate Armed Services Committee Chairman. At the end of June, when the Senate Armed Services Committee unveiled a bill that would eliminate funding proposed by the House in its version of the 1996 National Defense Authorization Act while purchasing parts and continuing production of B-2 bombers, Thurmond called it an effort to "achieve the appropriate balance of readiness, modernization and quality of life program." In late 1995, Thurmond joined a bipartisan coalition of politicians in supporting a petition intending "to loosen the rules governing the prescription drug methylphenidate". Thurmond attended the December 1995 funeral of South Carolina state senator Marshall Williams.

On December 5, 1996, Thurmond became the oldest serving member of the U.S. Senate, and on May 25, 1997, the longest-serving member (41 years and 10 months), casting his 15,000th vote in September 1998. In the following month, when astronaut and fellow Senator John Glenn was to embark on the Discovery at age 77, Thurmond, who was his senior by 19 years, reportedly sent him a message saying; "I want to go too."

On October 17, 1998, President Bill Clinton signed the Strom Thurmond National Defense Authorization Act for Fiscal Year 1999 into law, an authorization of "appropriations for military activities of the Department of Defense, military construction, and defense activities of the Department of Energy." Clinton stated that the bill being named after Thurmond was a "well-deserved and appropriate tribute" due to his thirty-six years in the U.S. Army Reserve and his primary focus in the Senate being on U.S. national defense.

Toward the end of Thurmond's Senate career, critics suggested his mental abilities had declined. His supporters argued that, while he lacked physical stamina due to his age, mentally he remained aware and attentive, and maintained a very active work schedule, showing up for every floor vote. He stepped down as Chairman of the Senate Armed Services Committee at the beginning of 1999, as he had pledged to do in late 1997.

== Ninth term (1997–2003) ==
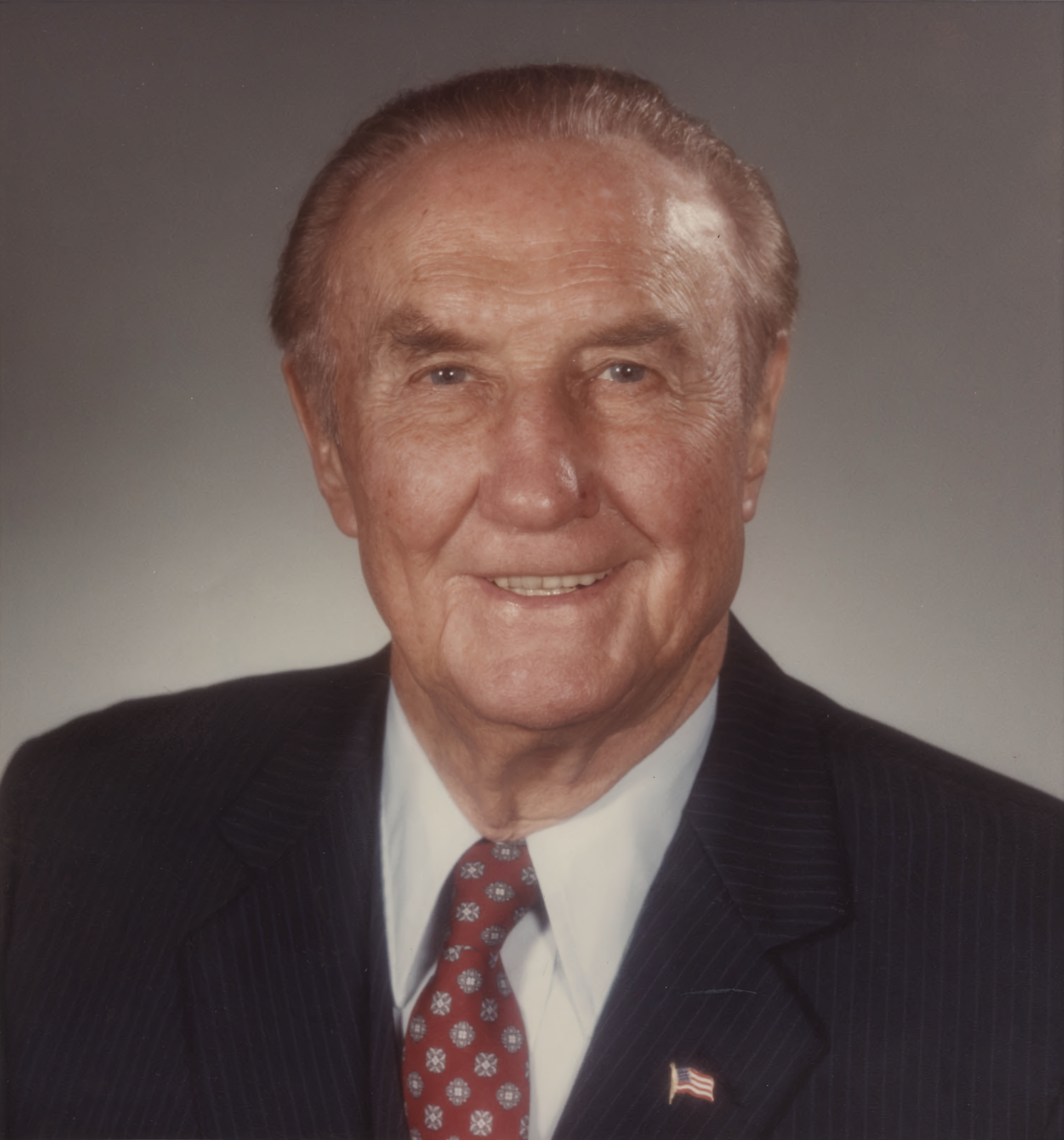
Thurmond during his later career

Thurmond received primary opposition from Harold G. Worley and Charlie Thompson. Throughout his 1996 campaign, the question of age appeared again, given that he was 93 years old at the time, with Thurmond even remarking that the issue was the only one expressed by members of the press. Kevin Sack observed, "As Mr. Thurmond campaigns for history, polls show that the vast majority of South Carolinians believe it is far past time for him to retire." Worley stated that the issue of age should be dealt with in the primary as opposed to the general election, encouraging Thurmond to be dropped as the seat's continuous nominee.

In the general election, Thurmond received 53.4 percent of the vote to the 44 percent of Democrat Elliott Springs Close.

In February 1999, Thurmond introduced legislation barring health messages on wine bottles, the measure intended to reverse what he called "erroneous and irresponsible" action of the Bureau of Alcohol, Tobacco and Firearms. The legislation transferred authority over labeling to the Department of Health and Human Services from the Treasury Department and increased taxes on wine. Thurmond admitted that he did not usually "favor increased taxes" but maintained that "the only way in which we will be able to finance adequate, impartial and trustworthy research into alcohol-induced diseases such as hypertension, breast cancer and birth defects is to generate a new revenue flow that will be used specifically for investigating such killers." On May 26, 1999, the Senate voted on an amendment to a spending bill exonerating Husband E. Kimmel and Walter C. Short of charges of failing to anticipate the attack on Pearl Harbor that led to American involvement in World War II. Thurmond was noted as one of five Senate members to have been a World War II veteran and back the measure and called Kimmel and Short "the last victims" of Pearl Harbor. In August, Thurmond underwent surgery for an enlarged prostate. In September, Thurmond was admitted to the Walter Reed Army Medical Center for tests, his press secretary John DeCrosta saying in a statement that doctors were interested in the source of Thurmond's fatigue and giving him evaluations.

In October 2000, Thurmond collapsed while lunching with a staff member and an acquaintance at a restaurant in Alexandria, Virginia and was admitted to Walter Reed; his spokeswoman Genevieve Erny stated that the collapse was found to have been unrelated to previous illnesses.

In January 2001, Thurmond endorsed his son Strom Thurmond Jr. for federal prosecutor in South Carolina in a recommendation to the Senate. In March, Thurmond voted for an amendment to the campaign finance reform bill of John McCain and Russ Feingold. Thurmond had initially opposed the measure and changed his vote at the last minute. On the morning of October 2, Thurmond was admitted to Walter Reed after fainting at his Senate desk. He was accompanied in the ambulance by fellow Republican and retired heart transplant surgeon Bill Frist. Declining to seek re-election in 2002, he was succeeded by then-Representative and fellow Republican Lindsey Graham.

External videos
- Strom Thurmond's 100th birthday party, held at the Dirksen Senate office building, December 5, 2002, C-SPAN
- Tour of Thurmond's Senate office prior to his retirement, December 19, 2002, C-SPAN

Thurmond left the Senate in January 2003 as the United States' longest-serving senator, a record later surpassed by Senator Byrd. In his November farewell speech in the Senate, Thurmond told his colleagues "I love all of you, especially your wives," the latter being a reference to his flirtatious nature with younger women. At his 100th birthday and retirement celebration in December, Thurmond said, "I don't know how to thank you. You're wonderful people, I appreciate you, appreciate what you've done for me, and may God allow you to live a long time."

Thurmond's 100th birthday was celebrated on December 5, 2002. Some remarks made by Mississippi Senator Trent Lott during the event were considered racially insensitive: "When Strom Thurmond ran for president, Mississippi voted for him. We're proud of it. And if the rest of the country had followed our lead, we wouldn't have had all these problems over the years, either." Fifteen days later, on December 20, Lott resigned as the Senate Republican leader effective on January 3, 2003, the beginning of the next congressional session.

== Sources ==
- Bass, Jack; Thompson, Marilyn W. (1998). Ol' Strom. Longstreet. ISBN 9781563525230. LCCN 98066360. OL 392148M.
- Cohodas, Nadine (1993). Strom Thurmond and The Politics of Southern Change. Simon & Schuster. ISBN 9780671689353. LCCN 92032417. OL 1728173M.
