= Mallery =

Mallery is a surname. Notable people with the name include:

- Garrick Mallery (1831–1894), American ethnologist
- Garrick Mallery (judge) (1784–1866), American jurist and politician
- Harvey J. Mallery, Michigan politician
- Joseph A. Mallery (1896–1982), ideological conservative in the Washington Supreme Court
- Karel van Mallery (1571–1635), Flemish engraver
- Peg Mallery (born 1967), American rower
- Philips van Mallery (1598–1634), Flemish engraver and publisher
- Susan Mallery (born 1970), American author of popular romance novels

== See also ==
- Mallery Lake, in Kivalliq Region in the Canadian territory of Nunavut
- Will and Andy Mallery, two supervillains in Wrath (comics)
- Mallory, surname and given name page
