= Mallory =

Mallory is an English surname. Spelling variants include Mallary, Mallery, Malorie, Mallorie, Mallerie and Mallorey. Mallory and Mallerie are also given names derived from the surname.

== Surname ==
- Arenia Mallory (1904–1977), American founder and head of what is now Saints Academy in Lexington, Mississippi, United States
- Benajah Mallory (c. 1764–1853), farmer, merchant and political figure in Upper Canada
- Berenice Mallory (1901–1997), American home economist, federal official
- Bill Mallory (1935–2018), American football head coach
- Boots Mallory (1913–1958), American film actress, dancer and model
- Caitlin Mallory (born 1987), American ice dancer who competes internationally for Estonia
- Carole Mallory (born 1942), American film actress and former model
- Clare Mallory, the penname of American children's author Winifred Constance McQuilkan Hall (1913–1991)
- Dashaun Mallory (born 1999), American football player
- Edward Mallory, born Edward Ralph Martz (1930–2007), American actor
- Francis Mallory (1807–1860), American naval officer, physician, railroad executive and U.S. Representative from Virginia
- Frank Burr Mallory (1862–1941), American pathologist for whom the Mallory body is named
- George Mallory (1886–1924), British mountaineer who died attempting to climb Mount Everest
- George Kenneth Mallory (1900–1986), American physician for whom Mallory-Weiss syndrome is named
- James Mallory (jurist) (1916–2003), Canadian academic and constitutional expert
- Javian Mallory (born 2007), American football player
- Jim Mallory (1918–2001), American baseball player
- JP Mallory (born 1945), Irish-American archaeologist and Indo-Europeanist
- L. B. Mallory (1871–1933), American politician and 28th Chief Clerk of the California Assembly
- Larry Mallory (born 1952), American football player
- Laura Mallory, an American who unsuccessfully attempted to have Harry Potter books removed from the Gwinnett County, Georgia, school system's library
- Lee Mallory (1945–2005), American singer, songwriter and guitarist
- Mae Mallory (1929–2007), American Black liberation leader and member of the Workers World Party
- Mark Mallory (born 1962), American politician in Ohio and elected Mayor of Cincinnati, Ohio, in 2005
- Michael Mallory (born 1955), American author and journalist
- Mike Mallory, former American football linebacker who is currently Assistant Special Teams Coach for the New Orleans Saints
- Molla Mallory (1892–1959), Norwegian-American tennis player
- Penny Mallory (born 1966), UK National Ladies Champion Rally Driver in 1993, and television presenter
- Philip Mallory (1885–1975), American businessman, one of the original founders of Duracell
- Robert Mallory (1815–1885), U.S. Representative from Kentucky
- Ronald Mallory (1932–2021), American painter, holographer and sculptor
- Rufus Mallory (1831–1914), U.S. Representative from Oregon
- Stephen Mallory (c. 1812–1873), U.S. Senator from Florida and Confederate Secretary of the Navy during the American Civil War
- Stephen Mallory II (1848–1907), U.S. Senator and U.S. Representative from Florida
- Thomas Malory (c. 1399–1471), English compiler of Le Morte d'Arthur, a book of French and English Arthurian romances
- Trafford Leigh-Mallory (1892–1944), senior Royal Air Force officer during WWII
- Victoria Mallory, the stage name of the American singer and actress, Vicki Morales (1948–2014)
- Will Mallory (born 1999), American football player
- William L. Mallory Sr. (1931–2013), the first African-American to serve as Ohio House of Representatives Majority Floor Leader

== Given name ==
=== Men ===
- Mallory Factor (born 1950), American businessman and political activist
- Mallory Horne (1925–2009), American politician
- Mallory Evan Wijesinghe (1918–2002), Sri Lankan engineer and entrepreneur

=== Women ===
- Mallory Burdette (born 1991), American tennis player
- Mallory Deluce (born 1989), American ice hockey player
- Mallory Ervin (born 1985), American beauty pageant titleholder
- Mallory Hagan (born 1988), American beauty pageant titleholder
- Mallory Lewis (born 1963), American puppeteer, television producer and writer
- Mallory Manning (1981–2008), New Zealander murdered in 2008
- Mallory Reaves (born 1984), American writer
- Mallory Snyder (born 1984), American model
- Mallory Souliotis (born 1996), American retired ice hockey player
- Mallerie Stromswold, American politician
- Mallory Swanson (born 1998), American soccer player
- Malorie Urbanovitch (born 1988), Canadian fashion designer
- Mallory Weggemann (born 1989), American Paralympic swimmer

== Fictional characters ==
- Kathleen Mallory, a New York City police detective featured in a series of mystery novels by Carol O'Connell
- Michael Mallory, a character from the television series Sliders

== Science and medicine ==
- Mallory body
- Mallory's trichrome stain

== Other ==
- P. R. Mallory and Co Inc, a former US producer of dry cell batteries (including the Duracell brand) and electronic components
- Mallory is the conventional name for an attacker in cryptographic examples; see Alice and Bob.
- The McNabb-Mallory rule is a rule of evidence in United States law.

== See also ==
- List of places named Mallory, a list of places categorized by region, and fictional places
- List of places named Mallory (historical), a list of historical places named Mallory which no longer exist or are known by other names
