= List of places named Mallory =

This is a list of places named Mallory (categorized by geographical region, nation, state, etc.), fictional places and a list of places historically linked to the name.

== Antarctica ==
(Antarctica)

- Mallory Bluff on the northwest slope of Grindley Plateau, just northeast of Wahl Glacier was named in honor of Roger P. Mallory, Jr. by the Advisory Committee on Antarctic Names; (84.0333°S 119.2836°E)
- Mallory Point includes Australia, USA, and Russia Stations; (66.8°S 108.6°E)

== Asia ==
=== China ===
==== Shandong ====
- Kathleen Mallory Hospital for Women, founded in 1901, is a Christian Hospital in Laichowfu; (37.1717°N 119.921°E)

== Europe ==
=== United Kingdom ===
==== England ====
===== Leicestershire =====
- Kirkby Mallory is a small village; (52.6°N 1.317°W)
- Mallory Park is a motor racing circuit in Kirkby Mallory; (52.5986°N 1.3378°W)

== North America ==
=== Canada ===
==== British Columbia ====
- Mallory Islands; (52.2153°N 128.2620°W)
- Mount Mallory, elevation ca. 2,545 meters (8,350 ft) (52.2944°N 118.02222°W)

==== Ontario ====
- Long Mallory Lake; (44.99945°N 77.16575°W)
- Mallory Bay; (44.0848°N 77.0672°W)
- Mallory Beach; (44.8004°N 81.0899°W)
- Mallory Creek; (44.9835°N 77.2645°W)
- Mallory Hill, elevation ca. 304 meters (1,000 ft); notable for "Darkest Skies in Southern Canada" (45.0455°N 77.1166°W)
- Mallory Lake; (44.98544°N 77.23644°W)
- Mallorytown; (44.47746°N 75.87935°W)

==== Saskatchewan ====
- Mallory Island; (55.13343°N 105.01760°W)

=== United States ===
==== Alabama ====
===== Coffee County =====
- Mallory Lake is a reservoir on a tributary of Cripple Creek; (31.266°N 86.19167°W)

===== Talladega County =====
- Mallory Mountain, elevation 830' is a summit; (33.30833°N 86.23667°W)

==== Arkansas ====
===== Crittenden County =====
- Mallory Spur is a populated location; (35.01556°N 90.38528°W)

==== Arizona ====
===== Apache County =====
- Mallory Draw is a valley; (34.34833°N 109.47111°W)
- Mallory Spring; (34.20583°N 109.55778°W)

===== Gila County =====
- Mallory Shaft is a mine; (33.42444°N 110.78806°W)

===== Graham County =====
- Mallory Detention Dam impounds a tributary of the Fort Thomas Canal; (33.04028°N 110.0123°W)

===== Mohave County =====
- Mallory Fault is a natural geologic feature in the Black Mountains near Oatman; (35.02360°N 114.37890°W)

==== California ====
===== Contra Costa County =====
- Mallory Ridge, a California Data Exchange Center Data Station in the Delta basin near Danville; (37.817°N 121.779°W)

===== Inyo County =====
- Mount Mallory, elevation 13,850' is a summit; (36.54889°N 118.26194°W)

===== Mendocino County =====
- Mallory House is a farmhouse renovated into a modern bed and breakfast facility and operated by Little River Inn
- Mallory Spring is a natural feature east of Ft. Bragg; (39.44694°N 123.64306°W)

==== Colorado ====
===== Boulder County =====
- Mallory Cave, named for E.C. Mallory after his first visit there in August 1932 is located on Dinosaur Mountain near Boulder; (39.9739°N 105.289578°W)

===== Jefferson County =====
- Mallory Manor Motel, once advertised as "Denver's Newest and Finest" is located in Lakewood; (39.73967°N 105.10512°W)

==== Connecticut ====
===== Litchfield County =====
- Mallory Brook is a tributary of the Shepaug River; (41.64252°N 73.3161°W)

===== New London County =====
- Charles Mallory House, the Mystic resident's Greek Revival home from 1828 to his death in 1882; (41.35344°N 71.96702°W)
- Charles Mallory Sail Loft, now part of Mystic Seaport, was purchased in 1837 by Charles Mallory for his sailmaking business; (41.36153°N 71.96584°W)
- Mallory Exhibit Hall is part of The Museum of America and the Sea at Mystic Seaport; (41.36267°N 71.96386°W)
- Mallory Hill, elevation 95 feet (29 m) is a summit near New London; (41.34111°N 72.11722°W)

==== Florida ====
===== Alachua County =====
- Mallory Hall is a University of Florida residence hall in Gainesville named in honor of Angela Mallory (1815–1901); (29.64688°N 82.34032°W)

===== Jackson County =====
- Mallory Heights, elevation 135' is a community east of Marianna; (30.76111°N 85.18889°W)

===== Lafayette County =====
- Mallory Swamp, at 30,501 acres in area, is the source of the Steinhatchee River just south of Mayo; (29.84972°N 83.08028°W)

===== Monroe County =====
- Mallory Dock is located in Key West; (24.55944°N 81.80667°W)
- Mallory's Key, located in Florida Bay was named for the Mallory family who were early settlers of Key West; (24.68611°N 81.635°W)
- Mallory Museum, located in the Hospitality House at Mallory Square chronicles the history of the Mallory Docks and surrounding area
- Mallory Square, named in honor of Stephen Russell Mallory located on the waterfront in Key West's historic town; (24.5599°N 81.80763°W)

===== Pinellas County =====
- Mallory Powell Social Service Center in Clearwater was named in honor of Mr. and Mrs. George L. Mallory and Bernie Powell; (27.957083°N 82.773599°W)

===== Sumter County =====
- Mallory Hill Country Club consists of three 9-hole golf courses at The Villages; (28.937803°N 81.97122°W)

==== Georgia ====
===== Fulton County =====
- Mallory Estates is a populated area near Mallory Road; (33.59417°N 84.5275°W)

===== Glynn County =====
- Mallory Park is a neighborhood on St. Simons Island near Mallory Street and Mallory Circle; (31.14528°N 81.39111°W)

===== Lowndes County =====
- Mallory Field is a private-use turf airstrip in Valdosta; (30.95084°N 83.23416°W)

===== Spalding County =====
- Mallory Lake is a small reservoir impounded by Mallory Lake Dam; (33.2635°N 84.414°W)

===== Troup County =====
- Mallory Lake is a reservoir located between LaGrange and Interstate 85; (33.02167°N 84.99°W)

===== Twiggs County =====
- Mallory Lake is a small reservoir on a tributary of Flat Creek; (32.73806°N 83.45167°W)

===== Wilkes County =====
- Mallorysville was incorporated as a village 9 December 1819 with William Mallory as one of its original commissioners. It was unincorporated 1 July 1995; (33.895°N 82.77444°W)

===== Wilkinson County =====
- Mallory Branch is a stream; (32.7136°N 83.2877°W)

==== Idaho ====
===== Clearwater County =====
- Mallory Creek is a tributary of the East Fork of the Potlatch River; (46.8763°N 116.267°W)

==== Illinois ====
===== Lake County =====
- Mallory Industrial Park is located in Libertyville; (42.31429°N 88.01131°W)

==== Indiana ====
===== Fountain County =====
- Mallory Branch empties into the Wabash River near Covington; (40.14361°N 87.40861°W)
- Camp Mallory is a private recreation facility owned by The P.R. Mallory Conservation Club on Mallory Road; (39.54556°N 86.42°W)

==== Iowa ====
===== Clayton County =====
- Mallory Township is a populated place named for Allen Horace Mallory who settled in the area in 1838; (42.691944°N 91.190556°W)
- Mallory Township Bridge in Osterdock was listed on the National Register of Historic Places in 1998; (42.7189°N 91.1786°W)

Franklin County

- Mallory Memorial County Park is located on Mallory Drive south of Hampton; (42.6627534°N 93.2321465°W)

==== Kentucky ====
===== Barren County =====
- Mallory Capacitor, LLC is an electronics manufacturing facility in Glasgow; (36.996650°N 85.937485°W)

==== Massachusetts ====
===== Barnstable County =====
- Mallory Dock is a restaurant in Barnstable Town (41.66239668°N 70.2753997°W)

===== Franklin County =====
- Mallory Brook empties into the Green River near Mt. Hermon Station; (42.69778°N 72.47222°W)

===== Suffolk County =====
- Mallory Institute of Pathology at Boston City Hospital is named for Frank Burr Mallory, M.D.(42.333601°N 71.07336°W)

==== Michigan ====
===== Hillsdale County =====
- Mallory Lake Drain is a stream that flows into Bean Creek; (41.8297708°N 84.37025°W)
- Mallory Lake is the source of Mallory Lake Drain; (41.8303264°N 84.403364°W)

St. Clair County, Michigan

- Mallory Drain is a canal; (42.9525°N 82.56917°W)

Washtenaw County

- Mallory House, a Victorian residence built in 1872 by W.H. Mallory and restored in 1974 as apartments, located in Ann Arbor; (42.2432°N 83.78575°W)

==== Minnesota ====
===== Polk County =====
- Mallory is a populated place located in Huntsville Township; (47.87667°N 96.91139°W)

==== Missouri ====
===== Randolph County =====
- Mallory Lake is a reservoir near Milton impounded by Mallory Lake Dam; (39.4700364°N 92.3235127°W)
- Mallory Van & Storage Co., Inc. is a private business in Moberly
- Mallory Transfer & Storage Co. is a long-established private business in Moberly

==== Nebraska ====
===== Douglas County =====
- Mallory Kountze Planetarium in the Durham Science Center on the North Campus of University of Nebraska at Omaha was named in memory of the Hitchcock Foundation president who died in 1984; (41.258763°N 96.01309°W)

==== Nevada ====
===== White Pine County =====
- Mallory Canyon is located near the Utah State line; (39.70694°N 114.12222°W)

==== New Jersey ====
===== Essex County =====
- Mallory Hall is a Montclair State University academic building named in honor of Virgil Mallory in Montclair; (40.8619°N 74.1971°W)

===== Hudson County =====
- Mallory Avenue is a street on the Jersey City's West Side

==== New York ====
===== Albany County =====
- Mallorys Corners is a location in the south part of the town of Bethlehem; (42.56528°N 73.82528°W)

===== Chemung County =====
- Mallory Creek is a stream; (42.05465°N 76.6245°W)
- Mallory Hill is a summit near Sullivanville; (42.21361°N 76.73972°W)

===== Cortland County =====
- Mallory Brook is a stream; (42.555°N 75.896°W)

===== Delaware County =====
- Mallory Brook is a stream; (42.17278°N 75.02278°W)

===== Nassau County =====
- Mallory Pier is located near Kings Point;(40.81251002°N 73.76555443°W)

===== Oswego County =====
- Mallory is a hamlet; (43.323°N 76.116°W)
- Malory Station is a location in Hastings west of the hamlet of Mallory; (43.33031°N 76.12978°W)

===== Otsego County =====
- Mallory Corner is located where Ben McCumber and Robert Williams Roads intersect with Wilbur Hill Road; (42.42417°N 75.29361°W)

===== Steuben County =====
- Mallory Mill in Hammondsport was listed on the National Register of Historic Places in 1999; (42.410833°N 77.226667°W),

===== Sullivan County =====
- Mallory Brook flows from Mallory Pond into Lake Superior in Lake Superior State Park; (41.66575°N 74.88556°W)
- Mallory Pond, named for early settler Daniel Mallory, is west of Lake Superior State Park; (41.66314°N 74.90333°W)

===== Tompkins County =====
- Malloryville; (42.53389°N 76.30028°W)

===== Warren County =====
- Mallory Island is located on Lake George in the Adirondack Park Preserve; (43.71222°N 73.47472°W)

==== North Carolina ====
===== Brunswick County =====
- Little Mallory Creek; (34.16722°N 77.97694°W)
- Mallory Creek is a tributary of the Cape Fear River; (34.16722°N 77.97694°W)

===== Robeson County =====
- Mallory Church is located near St. Paul's Township; (34.83583°N 78.92333°W)

==== Ohio ====
===== Hamilton County =====
- Mallory Center for Community Development, 3262 Beekman Street in Cincinnati is a non-profit agency founded by William L. Mallory, Sr.; (39.14454°N 84.55116°W)

===== Ohio County =====
- Mallory, Ogden House, a federal style residence located in Sandusky was cited for significance between 1825 and 1849 and listed on The National Register of Historic Places in 1982; (41.455278°N 82.703611°W)

===== Monroe County =====
- The Mallory House, a stately Victorian home located in Woodsfield.

==== Oregon ====
===== Grant County =====
- Mallory Creek flows from Mallory Spring in the North Fork John Day Wilderness; (44.97306°N 119.28361°W)

===== Klamath County =====
- Mallory Reservoir; (42.2575°N 121.2685°W)
- Mallory Spring; (42.225°N 121.3°W)

===== Morrow County =====
- Mallory Spring; (45.09417°N 119.30861°W)

===== Multnomah County =====
- Mallory Hotel is the former name of Portland's Hotel deLuxe. It was built in 1912 and in 2006 the name was changed to DeLuxe. (Coordinates: 45°31′15.4″N 122°41′15.6″W)
- Mallory Meadows is a City Park in Portland; (45.5631°N 122.6631°W)

==== Pennsylvania ====
===== Bradford County =====
- Mallory Creek is a tributary of the Susquehanna River; (41.89861°N 76.51278°W)

==== South Carolina ====
===== Dillon County =====
- Mallory Church of God; (34.379°N 79.521°W)
- Mallory Cross Roads is located at the intersection of Bay Catfish Road and Catfish Church Road; (34.38333°N 79.5175°W)

==== South Dakota ====
===== Lawrence County =====
- Mallory Gulch is a valley along tributaries of Sand Creek that flow from South Dakota into Wyoming; (44.38333°N 104.06417°W)

===== Perkins County =====
- Mallory Draw is a valley along a tributary of Rabbit Creek(45.41583°N 102.73361°W)

==== Tennessee ====
===== Cheatham County =====
- Mallory Church is located in Thomasville; (36.415°N 87.1325°W)

===== Shelby County =====
- Mallory is a neighborhood in the southwest part of Memphis; (35.0975°N 90.0625°W)
- Mallory Bayou is a stream near Memphis; (35.07778°N 90.05917°W)
- Mallory-Neely House in Victorian Village was built in 1852 and the home of Barton Lee Mallory and Daisy Neely after they were married in 1900; (35.1453101°N 90.0384736°W)
- William Neely Mallory Gymnasium, built in 1952 on the Rhodes College campus in Memphis; (35.1566°N 89.9897°W)

===== Williamson County =====
- Mallory Branch is a stream flowing from a spring house at CoolSprings Galleria; (35.96333°N 86.81361°W)

==== Texas ====
===== Delta County =====
- Mallory Creek, also known as Honey Creek where it arises in Lamar County, is a tributary of the North Sulphur River's Old River Channel; (33.48528°N 95.61694°W)

===== Lamar County =====
- Branch Mallory Creek Bridge, is a pony truss bridge built in 1968 over a branch of Mallory Creek on County Road 24140;(33.503041°N 95.630279°W)

==== Vermont ====
===== Washington County =====
- Mallory Brook is a tributary of the Winooski River; (44.26333°N 72.49444°W)

==== Virginia ====
===== Buckingham County =====
- Mallorys Creek is a tributary of the James River; (37.63639°N 78.76889°W)

===== Essex County =====
- Mallory Point is a cape on the Rappahannock River; (37.97139°N 76.87611°W)

===== Isle of Wight County =====
- Mallory Todd House, built in 1753 is a private residence in Smithfield; (36.982805°N 76.630551°W)

===== King William County =====
- Mallory Creek joins Jacks Creek before it flows into the Pamunkey River; (37.61944°N 77.0575°W)

===== Nelson County =====
- Mallory Creek joins Pauls Creek before it flows into the Rockfish River; (37.91944°N 78.83972°W)

===== Nottoway County =====
- Mallorys Creek is a tributary of the Little Nottoway River near Mallory Hill Road;(37.14167°N 78.15°W)

===== Rockbridge County =====
- Mallory Hall is a Virginia Military Institute academic building near the southwest corner of the Parade Grounds in Lexington; (37.78939°N 79.43785°W)

==== Washington ====
===== Asotin County =====
- Mallory Ridge, elevation 3,870 feet (1,180 m) et; (46.08083°N 117.271°W)

==== West Virginia ====
===== Kanawha County =====
- Mallory Airport is a private-use airport located near South Charleston; (38.335833°N 81.739444°W)

===== Logan County =====
- Mallory is a census-designated place (CDP) named when Mallory Coal Co. began operations there in 1917; (37.730315°N 81.835857°W)

==== Wyoming ====
===== Crook County =====
- Mallory Gulch is a valley along tributaries of Sand Creek that flow into Wyoming from South Dakota; (44.38389°N 104.06389°W)

== Oceania ==
=== New Zealand ===
==== South Island, Te Waipounamu ====
- Mallory Peak, elevation ca. 956 meters (3,140 ft) is in the Otago region;
- Mount Mallory, elevation ca. 2,242 meters (7,360 ft) is in the West Coast region;

== Fictional places ==
- Malory Towers is a fictional Cornish seaside boarding school in a series of six novels by British children's author Enid Blyton

== Historical ==
This is a list of historical places named Mallory which no longer exist or are known by other names.

- Charles Henry Mallory House, a clapboard residence built in Mystic, Connecticut in 1884 and razed in the early twentieth century; (41.35405°N 71.9668°W)
- Charles Mallory & Sons Shipyards built sail and steam powered ships from 1851 to 1875 on the current site of the Henry B. duPont Preservation Shipyard in Mystic Seaport, New London County, Connecticut; (41.35902°N 71.96525°W)
- C.H. Mallory & Co., founded in 1865 by Charles Henry Mallory, operated passenger service, freight shipping and other subsidiaries from its main office 139 Front Street in New York City; (40.7053°N 74.006°W). The Mallory Steamship Lines were incorporated into the New York & Texas Steamship Company which became the Mallory-Clyde Lines after it was sold in 1906. The company's branch office address was 385 Broadway; (40.71827°N 74.00297°W).
- D.D. Mallory & Co. was an oyster and fruit cannery owned by Dwight Davidson Mallory based near Fell's Point in Baltimore, Maryland from 1862 to 1882; (39.27944°N 76.58806°W). Also a wholesale grocery distributor, other locations retained the name under different owners, including Detroit, Wayne County, Michigan until 1892; (42.323°N 83.0652°W)
- F.B. Mallory, Inc., established in 1908, operated a dairy where duplexes are now located in Springfield, Massachusetts; (42.08826°N 72.55466°W)
- George W. Mallory House was an 1880s mansard-roofed residence on what is now a parking lot in Mystic, Connecticut; (41.35269°N 71.96365°W)
- Hotel Mallory, commissioned by Rufus Mallory and built in 1912, the 130 room Portland, Oregon landmark was renamed "Hotel deLuxe" after a major renovation in 2006; (45.520987°N 122.687707°W)
- Malore Manor House was probably built by Geoffrey Mallory between 1154 and 1189 just north of Kirkby Mallory in Leicestershire, England; all traces of the structure, surrounding moats and fortifications have disappeared; (52.612403°N 1.33160°W)
- Mallory Air Force Depot, built in 1943, was the second largest employer in Memphis, Tennessee at over 3,000 civilians, 34 officers and 14 airmen when plans for its gradual closing were announced in 1957; (35.170279°N 89.948876°W)
- Mallory and Mallory Post Office were historical place names for a location on the railroad between Defiance and Manila in Shelby County, Iowa; (41.8583209°N 95.3155533°W)
- Mallory Castle, formally known as "Ilion," was a mansion built by Smith H. Mallory north of Chariton, Iowa in 1879 and razed in 1955; (41.02554°N 93.31337°W)
- Mallory Dairy Bar served ice cream and sandwiches in Springfield, Hampden County, Massachusetts; (42.13096°N 72.52648°W)
- Mallory Dock, built in 1927 was formally rededicated as The Texas Cruise Ship Terminal 27 September 2000 after a $10.6 million renovation project at Piers 23 through 26 on Galveston Island, Texas; (29.30852°N 94.797292°W)
- Mallory Farmhouse, home of Cecil Roy Mallory, built about 1915 on the Pacific Coast in Mendocino County, California is no longer on its original site. It was moved back from the highway and renovated for use as a modern bed and breakfast facility called "Mallory House"
- Mallory Ford was a crossing point on the North Anna River near present-day State Route 639 in Orange County, Virginia; (38.1425°N 78.07139°W)
- Mallory Grove, located on the old Kidder Road about a mile west of Hamilton (39°44′38″N 93°59′56″W) in Caldwell County, Missouri, was a woods that was cut down before the 1930s
- Mallory Hat Company, the E.A. Mallory Company, operated in Danbury, Fairfield County, Connecticut from 1860 until 1969 when its 5-acre (20,000 m^{2}) site was purchased by the Danbury Hat Company; (41.397348°N 73.46°W)
- Mallory House, located on the site of one of the oldest dwellings in downtown Oberlin, Ohio was drastically renovated by Mary Pope Mallory in 1932 and re-dedicated as "Shansi House" in 2002(41.29243°N 82.2153°W)
- Mallory Mill was located on what is now Old Dowling Mill Road between Choccolocco and Old Davisville in Calhoun County, Alabama; (33.64444°N 85.69639°W)
- Mallory Mineral Springs was a popular gathering place east of Berea in Madison County, Kentucky (37.56889°N 84.17952°W)
- Mallory Opera House built in 1807 by Charles H. Mallory in Paola, Miami County, Kansas, burned 27 October 1921
- Mallory Post Office in Beaver County, Oklahoma was named for the first postmaster, F.C. Mallory 15 Jul 1905 and abandoned 31 Dec 1907
- Mallory Post Office was located in Louisa County, Virginia; (37.94972°N 78.15806°W)
- Mallory School was founded by Alexander Mallory, Jr. upon his return to Brunswick County, Virginia after the Civil War; (36.795280°N 77.711940°W)
- Mallory School was located in Portage County, Wisconsin; (44.52556°N 89.74667°W)
- Mallory School was located in Ray County, Missouri; (39.2275°N 93.78778°W)
- Mallory School was near Mallory Road in Crawford County, Pennsylvania; (41.5225°N 80.1375°W)
- Mallory School was near Mallory Road in Morgan County, Georgia; (33.67972°N 83.51444°W)
- Mallory's Opera Block, built by Smith H. Mallory in Chariton, Iowa was destroyed by fire in 1904; (41.0143°N 93.3086°W)
- Mallory Spring, a convenient source of fresh water for travellers and their horses on the road between Elkton and Claymour in Todd County, Kentucky purchased from the Mallory family by the State in 1931 and developed as part of Blue and Gray Park; the spring remains, but the park no longer exists; (36.852325°N 87.138662°W)
- Mallory's, or Mallory was a historical place-name in Williamson County, Tennessee, likely taking its name from the Revolutionary War pensioner, Roger Mallory whose homeplace was near present-day Mallory Station Road; (35.95583°N 86.83056°W)
- Mallory was a historical place name in Shelby County, Alabama; (33.25333°N 86.43972°W)
- Mallory was the historical place name for present-day Riverdale in Sumner County, Kansas; (37.39121°N 97.37569°W)
- Mallory Wharf was a series of wooden piers on the east bank of Mystic River adjoining Charles Mallory & Sons Shipyards in Mystic, Connecticut
- Mallory Wharf was located between the foot of Mansfield Street and Monck Street in Brunswick, Glynn County, Georgia; (31.146364°N 81.49742°W)
- Mount Mallory, was a neighborhood in Big Grove Township, Kendall County, Illinois where Elmer F. Mallory's family settled in 1836; It may have been in or near the area known today as Mount Pleasant; (37.450115°N 89.073082°W)

== See also ==
- Eponym
- Mallory as a surname
- Toponymy
