= Carole Mallory =

American journalist and actress

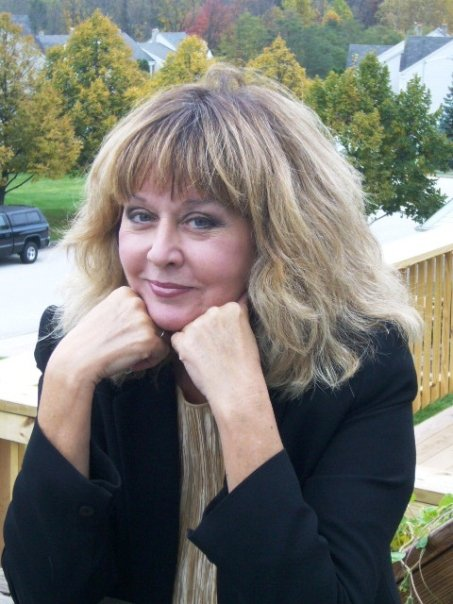
Carole Mallory

Carole Mallory (born January 8, 1942) is an American author, actress, former model, teacher and critic who appeared in the films Looking for Mr. Goodbar and The Stepford Wives. She was the nine-year companion of writer Norman Mailer and kept notes and her writings with his edits, selling them to Harvard University in 2008, after his death.

== Acting ==
Mallory filmed over fifty commercials. Her first spot was for Olympic Airlines, the award-winning ‘no dancing in the aisles’ campaign, while on leave of absence from Pan American Airlines. She also appeared in the "English Leather" commercial campaign ("All my men wear English Leather, or they wear nothing at all") commercial campaign, which ran for ten years. Her commercial for Faberge's "Tigress" campaign titled "Are You Wild Enough to Wear It?" directed by Michael Cimino was banned as too risque for one of the networks because her crocheted bathing suit with its spider web effect did not have support. As she ran towards the camera while performing a strip tease, her breasts jiggled. In the early seventies "jiggling breasts" were forbidden on TV. 60 Minutes aired her Faberge Tigress commercial in one of its segments about sex in television. Mallory starred as Madge in the play Picnic, and as Tiffany in Mary, Mary at the Bucks County Playhouse in New Hope, Pennsylvania. During the early seventies she studied with Wynn Handman, the director of The American Place Theatre, in New York. When she moved to Hollywood, she studied with Harvey Lembeck in his Comedy Improvisation Workshop.

== Writing ==
Mallory authored the 1988 novel Flash about a female alcoholic surviving Hollywood. Gloria Steinem wrote that it was: "fast, smart and irresistible."

In 2010, she published a memoir, Loving Mailer. Between 1988 and 1996, as a journalist, she interviewed Kurt Vonnegut, Joseph Heller, Gore Vidal, Dudley Moore, Brooke Astor, Jesse Jackson, Erica Jong, Jay McInerney, Mikhail Baryshnikov, Isabella Rossellini, Leiber & Stoller, Miloš Forman, George Plimpton, and other notables.

Her writing has been published by: The New York Times, the Los Angeles Times, Esquire, Playboy, Parade, Elle, New Women, Time Out, and M Magazine. Among the books she has written are:

- Vidal vs. Mailer (2016)
- My Friendship with Kurt Vonnegut and Joseph Heller (2013)
- My Friendship with Norman Mailer and Gore Vidal (How They Buried The Hatchet), 2013.
- " Picasso's Ghost" (2013)

She has taught at Rosemont College, Cheltenham Adult School and Widener University and worked as a book reviewer for The Philadelphia Inquirer. In 1983, she began a nine-year relationship with Norman Mailer, who urged her to quit acting and pursue writing. She went on to study writing at UCLA, NYU, and Columbia University. After Mailer's death, she sold seven boxes of documents and photographs to Harvard University, containing extracts of her letters, books and journals.

== Public speaking ==
On June 28, 1987, when Mallory's story of overcoming alcoholism was the cover story of Parade Magazine, she was asked to speak at her alma mater, Pennsylvania State University, for a D.U.I. convention of mothers who had lost children to drunk drivers. On October 5, 2013, she was invited to be keynote speaker at Tucson Modernism Week, in Tucson, Arizona—a celebration of mid-century modernism in art and architecture. Because she was a Pan Am airline hostess in the 1960s, Mallory was asked to speak about how this propelled her into becoming a model, an actress, an author, a critic and a teacher.

On October 16, 2013, she was asked to speak at the Elkin's Park Library about her memoir Picasso's Ghost. She also spoke about this book on January 13, 2013, at the Lower Providence Library about Picasso's Ghost. In March 2014, in celebration of Woman's History Month, the Chester County Library asked Mallory to speak about her life experiences and career, both to celebrate the history and empowerment of women.

== Personal life ==
In 1968, she married the artist Ronald Mallory, whose kinetic mercury sculptures are featured in the Whitney Museum, MoMA, as well as a variety of other museums and venues. In 1971, the Mallorys divorced.

On the night of Pablo Picasso's death on April 8, 1973, Claude Picasso asked her to be his wife. Their love affair ended in 1980.

She has dated Sean Connery, Rod Stewart, Peter Sellers, Warren Beatty, Marcello Mastroianni, Louis Malle, Richard Gere, Robin Williams, Milos Forman and Robert De Niro.

Mallory married Kenneth Gambone in 2000. She was a film critic for The Huffington Post until 2018.

== Filmography ==
- The Killer Elite (1975) as Rita
- The Stepford Wives (1975) as wife, Kit Sunderson
- Seen Dimly Before Dawn (1976)
- Starsky and Hutch (1976) S1/E21 : Sue Bellamy
- Prime Time a.k.a. American Raspberry (1977) Morning Mist girl
- Looking for Mr. Goodbar (1977) as Marvella
- Steel (1980) as Charlene
- Brave New World (1980) as Miss Trotsky
- Take This Job and Shove It (1981) as B-Jo.
- Fire and Ice (1983 film) (1983) Rotoscoped by Frank Frazetta for Ralph Bakshi/Voice of Queen of the Fire Planet
- Norman Mailer: The American (2010) Eraser Films documentary
- The Robin Williams Autopsy (2015) Reelz TV documentary by ITV London
