= Malaria (disambiguation) =

Malaria is a mosquito-borne infectious disease that affects humans and other animals.

Malaria may also refer to:

- Malaria (1919 film), a German silent film
- Malaria (1943 film), a French drama film
- Malaria (2016 film), an Iranian drama film
- Malaria!, an experimental electronic band from West Berlin
- Malaria Road, a street in Caloocan, Philippines
