= Ronald Mallory =

American artist (1932–2021)

Ronald Mallory (June 17, 1932 – July 7, 2021) was a Philadelphia born architect and artist who worked in New York City and Milan, Italy, and his old age lived in San Miguel de Allende, Mexico. His family had come to United States from Russia. He studied architecture in Brazil with Oscar Niemayer. In the sixties, he was one of the founding members of the kinetic art movement which took him to become a star in Paris, Monte Carlo and New York. In particular, his works involving mercury and acrylic have become icons, and are represented in many important private collections and museums in United States as including the Museum of Modern Art of New York as well as most of the top museums and collections in the United States, in Europe , Mexico City and Dubai

Mallory was a student of the late Pol Bury, friends of many celebrities and himself a famous jet setter. He was funny, brilliant and extremely talented worked in many mediums, sculpture, digital art and oil paintings.

== Personal life ==
Mallory was first married to Giselle a Parisian Dior model from Paris and then to actress, model and author Carole Mallory, from 1968 to 1971. He never stopped working and producing sculptures and paintings exhibiting in Mexico and rue de Lille in Paris. He was much loved and well surrounded til the end of his beautiful life. Mallory died of natural causes in San Miguel de Allende, Mexico on July 7, 2021, at age 89.
