= McNabb-Mallory rule =

The McNabb-Mallory rule (sometimes referred to as just the Mallory rule) is the U.S. rule of evidence that a confession is inadmissible if obtained during an unreasonably long period of detention between arrest and initial court appearance.

The rule was largely superseded by the broader protections provided for under the Miranda rules.

The rule opened a line of cases which referenced a unique power of the Supreme Court to exercise a supervisory power in law enforcement, evidence, and procedure in federal courts.
