= List of elections in 1933 =

The following elections occurred in the year 1933.

== Africa ==
- 1933 South African general election
- 1933 Southern Rhodesian general election

== Asia ==
- 1933 Hong Kong sanitary board election
- 1933 Iraqi parliamentary election
- 1933 Siamese general election

== Europe ==
- 1933 Andorran parliamentary election
- 1933 Danish local elections
- 1933 Dutch general election
- June 1933 Estonian constitutional referendum
- October 1933 Estonian constitutional referendum
- 1933 Finnish parliamentary election
- 1933 Greek legislative election
- 1933 Greek presidential election
- 1933 Icelandic parliamentary election
- 1933 Icelandic prohibition referendum
- 1933 Irish general election
- 1933 Latvian presidential election
- 1933 Liechtenstein local elections
- 1933 Monegasque general election
- 1933 Norwegian parliamentary election
- 1933 Polish presidential election
- 1933 Portuguese constitutional referendum
- 1933 Romanian general election

=== Germany ===
- November 1933 German election
- 1933 German referendum
- March 1933 German federal election

=== Spain ===
- 1933 Spanish general election

=== United Kingdom ===
- 1933 Altrincham by-election
- 1933 Ashford by-election
- 1933 Clay Cross by-election
- 1933 East Fife by-election
- 1933 Fulham East by-election
- 1933 Harborough by-election
- 1933 Hitchin by-election
- 1933 Normanton by-election
- 1933 Northern Ireland general election
- 1933 Rhondda East by-election
- 1933 Rutland and Stamford by-election
- 1933 Skipton by-election
- 1933 Wentworth by-election
- 1933 Rhondda East by-election

== North America ==
=== Canada ===
- 1933 British Columbia general election
- 1933 Edmonton municipal election
- 1933 Nova Scotia general election
- 1933 Ottawa municipal election
- 1933 Toronto municipal election

=== United States ===
- 1933 New York state election

==== United States lieutenant gubernatorial ====
- 1933 Virginia lieutenant gubernatorial election

==== United States gubernatorial ====
- 1933 United States gubernatorial elections
- 1933 Virginia gubernatorial election

==== United States House of Representatives ====
- 1933 United States House of Representatives elections

==== United States Senate ====
- 1933 United States Senate elections
- 1933 United States Senate special election in Virginia

==== United States mayoral elections ====
- 1933 Boston mayoral election
- 1933 Cleveland mayoral election
- 1933 Los Angeles mayoral election
- 1933 Manchester, New Hampshire, mayoral election
- 1933 New York City mayoral election
- 1933 Pittsburgh mayoral election
- 1933 Springfield mayoral election

== Australia ==
- 1933 Annandale state by-election
- 1933 Barossa state by-election
- 1933 Bulli state by-election
- 1933 Flinders by-election
- 1933 Lismore state by-election
- 1933 South Australian state election
- 1933 Western Australian state election

== See also ==
- Category:1933 elections
