= 1937 Virginia gubernatorial election =

- November 2, 1937
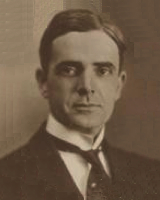

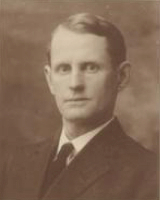
Nominee	James H. Price	J. Powell Royall
Party	Democratic	Republican
Popular vote	124,145	23,670
Percentage	82.78%	15.78%
- County and independent city results Price: 50–60% 60–70% 70–80% 80–90% >90% Royall: 50–60%
Governor before election
George C. Peery
Democratic
Elected Governor
James H. Price
Democratic

The 1937 Virginia gubernatorial election was held on November 2, 1937. Incumbent Governor George C. Peery, a Byrd Democrat, was unable to seek re-election due to term limits. James Hubert Price, incumbent lieutenant governor and former member of the Virginia House of Delegates, was nominated by the Democratic Party to run against the Republican nominee, former state senator John Powell Royall.

== Background ==
The 1900s had seen Virginia, like all former Confederate States, almost completely disenfranchise its black and poor white populations through the use of a cumulative poll tax and literacy tests. So severe was the disenfranchising effect of the new 1902 Constitution that it has been calculated that a third of those who voted were state employees and officeholders.

This limited electorate meant Virginian politics was controlled by political machines based in Southside Virginia – firstly one led by Thomas Staples Martin and after he died the Byrd Organization. Progressive "antiorganization" factions were rendered impotent by the inability of almost all their potential electorate to vote. Unlike the Deep South, historical fusion with the “Readjuster” Democrats, defection of substantial proportions of the Northeast-aligned white electorate of the Shenandoah Valley and Southwest Virginia over free silver, and an early move towards a "lily white" Jim Crow party meant Republicans retained a small but permanent number of legislative seats and local offices in the western part of the state. However, in many areas – like in Tennessee during the same era – the parties avoided competition by an agreed division over local offices, and in gubernatorial elections the Republican vote after Byrd came to power became mostly in the nature of a protest, with turnout in most elections higher in the Democratic primary than the general election.

=== New Deal challenge ===
In the first term after FDR's landslide 1932 election triumph, the now-established Byrd Organization had maintained firm control under Governor Peery, while Senator Byrd was already opposing many New Deal measures. Governor Peery would aim to combat the Depression using the traditional method of cutting spending, and opposed Roosevelt's Federal Emergency Relief Administration.

As early as June 1935, Lieutenant Governor Price announced he would be seeking the governorship in 1937. During most of 1936, Price would travel throughout the state seeking support, and by the time of the 1936 presidential election, it was clear that the Byrd Organization, who had supported FDR for re-election despite opposing the policies and philosophy of the New Deal, would not oppose Price, who was seen as "anti-organization" despite saying he supported Byrd's conservative economic policies.

Until Vivian L. Page withdrew from the lieutenant gubernatorial primary late in April, Price had no opponent in the primary. Page would campaign against Price on the basis that the latter was trying to "buy" votes, and to mislead the voters at a time when internal polling predicted a landslide for Price.

As it turned out, the primary was a landslide for Price, who defeated Page by a margin of more than six-to-one, and in the general election Price defeated Republican J. Powell Royall by nearly so large a margin in a rematch of the 1933 lieutenant gubernatorial contest. Royall's performance is the worst by a Republican gubernatorial candidate in Virginia, losing all but two counties or cites, and this is the last time Floyd County has backed a Democrat for Governor.

== Democratic primary ==
=== Candidates ===
- James H. Price, Lieutenant Governor since 1930 and former State Delegate from Richmond
- Vivian L. Page, State Senator from Norfolk

1937 Virginia Democratic gubernatorial primary
Party	Candidate	Votes	%	±%
Democratic	James H. Price	166,319	86.05%	
Democratic	Vivian L. Page	26,955	13.95%	
Majority		139,364	72.11%	
Turnout		193,274		
Democratic hold		Swing		

== General election ==
=== Candidates ===
- James H. Price, former State Delegate from Richmond (Democratic)
- J. Powell Royall, former State Senator from Tazewell County (Republican)
- Donald Burke (Communist)
- James A. Edgerton, Alexandria poet and perennial candidate (Prohibition)

=== Results ===
1937 Virginia gubernatorial election
Party	Candidate	Votes	%	±%
Democratic	James H. Price	124,145	82.78%	+9.04%
Republican	J. Powell Royall	23,670	15.78%	−8.46%
Communist	Donald Burke	1,164	0.78%	
Prohibition	James A. Edgerton	990	0.66%	−0.01%
Majority		100,475	67.00%	+23.50%
Turnout		149,969		−9.96%
Democratic hold		Swing		

==== Results by county or independent city ====
1937 Virginia gubernatorial election by county or independent city
	James Hubert Price Democratic		John Powell Royall Republican		Donald Burke Communist		James Arthur Edgerton Prohibition		Margin		Total votes cast
	#	%	#	%	#	%	#	%	#	%	Total votes cast
Accomack County	729	91.47%	64	8.03%	1	0.13%	3	0.38%	665	83.44%	797
Albemarle County	814	93.56%	47	5.40%	5	0.57%	4	0.46%	767	88.16%	870
Alleghany County	765	68.98%	322	29.04%	12	1.08%	10	0.90%	443	39.95%	1,109
Amelia County	349	88.35%	42	10.63%	0	0.00%	4	1.01%	307	77.72%	395
Amherst County	630	97.22%	12	1.85%	3	0.46%	3	0.46%	618	95.37%	648
Appomattox County	1,024	96.06%	36	3.38%	2	0.19%	4	0.38%	988	92.68%	1,066
Arlington County	1,978	82.66%	355	14.83%	25	1.04%	35	1.46%	1,623	67.82%	2,393
Augusta County	1,302	84.16%	213	13.77%	10	0.65%	22	1.42%	1,089	70.39%	1,547
Bath County	290	76.72%	85	22.49%	0	0.00%	3	0.79%	205	54.23%	378
Bedford County	708	86.87%	85	10.43%	4	0.49%	18	2.21%	623	76.44%	815
Bland County	497	62.75%	290	36.62%	3	0.38%	2	0.25%	207	26.14%	792
Botetourt County	908	68.17%	409	30.71%	8	0.60%	7	0.53%	499	37.46%	1,332
Brunswick County	497	99.40%	2	0.40%	0	0.00%	1	0.20%	495	99.00%	500
Buchanan County	1,063	74.75%	339	23.84%	15	1.05%	5	0.35%	724	50.91%	1,422
Buckingham County	399	93.01%	23	5.36%	1	0.23%	6	1.40%	376	87.65%	429
Campbell County	574	90.54%	49	7.73%	6	0.95%	5	0.79%	525	82.81%	634
Caroline County	397	94.08%	21	4.98%	0	0.00%	4	0.95%	376	89.10%	422
Carroll County	1,050	42.39%	1,377	55.59%	35	1.41%	15	0.61%	-327	-13.20%	2,477
Charles City County	125	94.70%	5	3.79%	1	0.76%	1	0.76%	120	90.91%	132
Charlotte County	585	96.06%	22	3.61%	2	0.33%	0	0.00%	563	92.45%	609
Chesterfield County	2,487	94.89%	101	3.85%	18	0.69%	15	0.57%	2,386	91.03%	2,621
Clarke County	358	94.71%	17	4.50%	2	0.53%	1	0.26%	341	90.21%	378
Craig County	272	74.52%	90	24.66%	2	0.55%	1	0.27%	182	49.86%	365
Culpeper County	486	92.05%	39	7.39%	1	0.19%	2	0.38%	447	84.66%	528
Cumberland County	235	93.25%	13	5.16%	1	0.40%	3	1.19%	222	88.10%	252
Dickenson County	1,207	71.80%	442	26.29%	26	1.55%	6	0.36%	765	45.51%	1,681
Dinwiddie County	1,228	97.93%	16	1.28%	5	0.40%	5	0.40%	1,212	96.65%	1,254
Elizabeth City County	2,103	96.42%	64	2.93%	10	0.46%	4	0.18%	2,039	93.49%	2,181
Essex County	255	91.40%	23	8.24%	1	0.36%	0	0.00%	232	83.15%	279
Fairfax County	1,233	85.15%	187	12.91%	14	0.97%	14	0.97%	1,046	72.24%	1,448
Fauquier County	770	91.34%	68	8.07%	2	0.24%	3	0.36%	702	83.27%	843
Floyd County	297	51.65%	261	45.39%	11	1.91%	6	1.04%	36	6.26%	575
Fluvanna County	407	92.50%	30	6.82%	1	0.23%	2	0.45%	377	85.68%	440
Franklin County	1,142	88.66%	133	10.33%	8	0.62%	5	0.39%	1,009	78.34%	1,288
Frederick County	386	81.95%	81	17.20%	2	0.42%	2	0.42%	305	64.76%	471
Giles County	892	75.34%	279	23.56%	9	0.76%	4	0.34%	613	51.77%	1,184
Gloucester County	501	93.64%	32	5.98%	1	0.19%	1	0.19%	469	87.66%	535
Goochland County	329	93.73%	18	5.13%	1	0.28%	3	0.85%	311	88.60%	351
Grayson County	1,965	46.98%	2,170	51.88%	18	0.43%	30	0.72%	-205	-4.90%	4,183
Greene County	131	70.81%	50	27.03%	0	0.00%	4	2.16%	81	43.78%	185
Greensville County	267	94.68%	13	4.61%	1	0.35%	1	0.35%	254	90.07%	282
Halifax County	1,368	98.13%	22	1.58%	1	0.07%	3	0.22%	1,346	96.56%	1,394
Hanover County	638	94.24%	34	5.02%	1	0.15%	4	0.59%	604	89.22%	677
Henrico County	2,664	93.02%	150	5.24%	36	1.26%	14	0.49%	2,514	87.78%	2,864
Henry County	546	86.12%	74	11.67%	9	1.42%	5	0.79%	472	74.45%	634
Highland County	261	65.74%	126	31.74%	7	1.76%	3	0.76%	135	34.01%	397
Isle of Wight County	443	96.10%	16	3.47%	0	0.00%	2	0.43%	427	92.62%	461
James City County	132	97.78%	3	2.22%	0	0.00%	0	0.00%	129	95.56%	135
King and Queen County	165	97.06%	4	2.35%	0	0.00%	1	0.59%	161	94.71%	170
King George County	135	81.33%	26	15.66%	2	1.20%	3	1.81%	109	65.66%	166
King William County	321	93.86%	15	4.39%	2	0.58%	4	1.17%	306	89.47%	342
Lancaster County	339	86.48%	48	12.24%	3	0.77%	2	0.51%	291	74.23%	392
Lee County	2,681	83.65%	450	14.04%	55	1.72%	19	0.59%	2,231	69.61%	3,205
Loudoun County	861	88.22%	107	10.96%	2	0.20%	6	0.61%	754	77.25%	976
Louisa County	671	92.55%	48	6.62%	2	0.28%	4	0.55%	623	85.93%	725
Lunenburg County	489	96.64%	12	2.37%	0	0.00%	5	0.99%	477	94.27%	506
Madison County	334	75.57%	99	22.40%	4	0.90%	5	1.13%	235	53.17%	442
Mathews County	318	87.36%	42	11.54%	1	0.27%	3	0.82%	276	75.82%	364
Mecklenburg County	825	97.40%	20	2.36%	1	0.12%	1	0.12%	805	95.04%	847
Middlesex County	300	96.46%	9	2.89%	0	0.00%	2	0.64%	291	93.57%	311
Montgomery County	1,153	67.43%	513	30.00%	27	1.58%	17	0.99%	640	37.43%	1,710
Nansemond County	475	98.34%	7	1.45%	1	0.21%	0	0.00%	468	96.89%	483
Nelson County	549	94.66%	27	4.66%	1	0.17%	3	0.52%	522	90.00%	580
New Kent County	164	90.61%	17	9.39%	0	0.00%	0	0.00%	147	81.22%	181
Norfolk County	1,861	96.93%	45	2.34%	6	0.31%	8	0.42%	1,816	94.58%	1,920
Northampton County	434	95.38%	18	3.96%	0	0.00%	3	0.66%	416	91.43%	455
Northumberland County	246	95.35%	12	4.65%	0	0.00%	0	0.00%	234	90.70%	258
Nottoway County	534	95.53%	16	2.86%	1	0.18%	8	1.43%	518	92.67%	559
Orange County	503	94.73%	27	5.08%	0	0.00%	1	0.19%	476	89.64%	531
Page County	1,521	76.09%	422	21.11%	47	2.35%	9	0.45%	1,099	54.98%	1,999
Patrick County	832	89.56%	91	9.80%	4	0.43%	2	0.22%	741	79.76%	929
Pittsylvania County	1,498	89.92%	155	9.30%	7	0.42%	6	0.36%	1,343	80.61%	1,666
Powhatan County	233	93.95%	14	5.65%	1	0.40%	0	0.00%	219	88.31%	248
Prince Edward County	478	94.09%	27	5.31%	0	0.00%	3	0.59%	451	88.78%	508
Prince George County	226	93.00%	8	3.29%	8	3.29%	1	0.41%	218	89.71%	243
Prince William County	628	89.59%	69	9.84%	1	0.14%	3	0.43%	559	79.74%	701
Princess Anne County	989	95.10%	45	4.33%	4	0.38%	2	0.19%	944	90.77%	1,040
Pulaski County	1,170	81.14%	259	17.96%	12	0.83%	1	0.07%	911	63.18%	1,442
Rappahannock County	307	95.94%	12	3.75%	1	0.31%	0	0.00%	295	92.19%	320
Richmond County	167	89.30%	15	8.02%	2	1.07%	3	1.60%	152	81.28%	187
Roanoke County	1,013	78.04%	261	20.11%	7	0.54%	17	1.31%	752	57.94%	1,298
Rockbridge County	855	82.77%	169	16.36%	4	0.39%	5	0.48%	686	66.41%	1,033
Rockingham County	2,093	57.42%	1,459	40.03%	21	0.58%	72	1.98%	634	17.39%	3,645
Russell County	1,944	81.10%	442	18.44%	4	0.17%	7	0.29%	1,502	62.66%	2,397
Scott County	1,772	59.09%	1,088	36.28%	99	3.30%	40	1.33%	684	22.81%	2,999
Shenandoah County	1,669	51.37%	1,558	47.95%	10	0.31%	12	0.37%	111	3.42%	3,249
Smyth County	1,926	60.64%	1,204	37.91%	22	0.69%	24	0.76%	722	22.73%	3,176
Southampton County	612	96.99%	18	2.85%	0	0.00%	1	0.16%	594	94.14%	631
Spotsylvania County	335	88.39%	40	10.55%	0	0.00%	4	1.06%	295	77.84%	379
Stafford County	409	75.60%	123	22.74%	4	0.74%	5	0.92%	286	52.87%	541
Surry County	341	96.88%	9	2.56%	2	0.57%	0	0.00%	332	94.32%	352
Sussex County	395	96.81%	11	2.70%	0	0.00%	2	0.49%	384	94.12%	408
Tazewell County	1,669	58.03%	1,188	41.31%	10	0.35%	9	0.31%	481	16.72%	2,876
Warren County	554	89.21%	58	9.34%	4	0.64%	5	0.81%	496	79.87%	621
Warwick County	636	92.04%	47	6.80%	4	0.58%	4	0.58%	589	85.24%	691
Washington County	1,451	76.05%	432	22.64%	12	0.63%	13	0.68%	1,019	53.41%	1,908
Westmoreland County	325	91.29%	27	7.58%	1	0.28%	3	0.84%	298	83.71%	356
Wise County	3,711	89.92%	374	9.06%	33	0.80%	9	0.22%	3,337	80.86%	4,127
Wythe County	1,396	58.80%	950	40.02%	19	0.80%	9	0.38%	446	18.79%	2,374
York County	254	93.73%	13	4.80%	1	0.37%	3	1.11%	241	88.93%	271
Alexandria City	1,366	93.88%	65	4.47%	7	0.48%	17	1.17%	1,301	89.42%	1,455
Bristol City	954	92.53%	70	6.79%	5	0.48%	2	0.19%	884	85.74%	1,031
Buena Vista City	140	88.05%	16	10.06%	0	0.00%	3	1.89%	124	77.99%	159
Charlottesville City	620	93.37%	38	5.72%	5	0.75%	1	0.15%	582	87.65%	664
Clifton Forge City	1,316	85.07%	202	13.06%	14	0.90%	15	0.97%	1,114	72.01%	1,547
Danville City	1,314	96.55%	36	2.65%	6	0.44%	5	0.37%	1,278	93.90%	1,361
Fredericksburg City	991	93.58%	65	6.14%	2	0.19%	1	0.09%	926	87.44%	1,059
Hampton City	831	96.29%	28	3.24%	2	0.23%	2	0.23%	803	93.05%	863
Harrisonburg City	1,358	70.55%	533	27.69%	16	0.83%	18	0.94%	825	42.86%	1,925
Hopewell City	927	93.64%	37	3.74%	18	1.82%	8	0.81%	890	89.90%	990
Lynchburg City	931	90.48%	85	8.26%	7	0.68%	6	0.58%	846	82.22%	1,029
Martinsville City	860	89.77%	86	8.98%	6	0.63%	6	0.63%	774	80.79%	958
Newport News City	3,652	93.40%	193	4.94%	40	1.02%	25	0.64%	3,459	88.47%	3,910
Norfolk City	6,721	93.48%	365	5.08%	61	0.85%	43	0.60%	6,356	88.40%	7,190
Petersburg City	693	97.47%	13	1.83%	4	0.56%	1	0.14%	680	95.64%	711
Portsmouth City	2,673	94.05%	121	4.26%	33	1.16%	15	0.53%	2,552	89.80%	2,842
Radford City	654	78.80%	155	18.67%	9	1.08%	12	1.45%	499	60.12%	830
Richmond City	8,992	96.46%	240	2.57%	68	0.73%	22	0.24%	8,752	93.89%	9,322
Roanoke City	3,620	83.68%	602	13.92%	57	1.32%	47	1.09%	3,018	69.76%	4,326
South Norfolk City	492	92.66%	23	4.33%	12	2.26%	4	0.75%	469	88.32%	531
Staunton City	739	90.79%	63	7.74%	4	0.49%	8	0.98%	676	83.05%	814
Suffolk City	700	96.42%	24	3.31%	1	0.14%	1	0.14%	676	93.11%	726
Williamsburg City	148	98.01%	3	1.99%	0	0.00%	0	0.00%	145	96.03%	151
Winchester City	999	88.10%	107	9.44%	14	1.23%	14	1.23%	892	78.66%	1,134
Totals	124,145	82.78%	23,670	15.78%	1,164	0.78%	990	0.66%	100,475	67.00%	149,969

Counties and independent cities that flipped from Republican to Democratic

- Floyd
