= Senator Harman =

Senator Harman may refer to:

- Arthur C. Harman (1854–1927), Virginia State Senate
- John N. Harman (1854–1934), Virginia State Senate
- Tom Harman (born 1941), Ohio State Senate

== See also ==
- Don Harmon (born 1966), Illinois State Senate
