= Roland E. Chase =

American lawyer & politician (1867–1948)

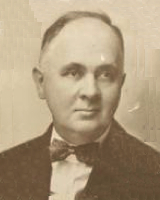

Member of the Virginia Senate from the 17th district
- In office January 13, 1932 – January 8, 1936
- Preceded by: John M. Beaty
- Succeeded by: Robert R. Parker

Member of the Virginia House of Delegates for Dickenson and Wise
- In office January 9, 1918 – January 11, 1922
- Preceded by: W. H. Roberts
- Succeeded by: William W. G. Dotson

Member of the Virginia Senate from the 3rd district
- In office January 8, 1908 – January 10, 1912
- Preceded by: R. Walter Dickenson
- Succeeded by: J. Powell Royall

Personal details
- Born: Roland Ephraim Chase; August 14, 1867 Clintwood, Virginia, U.S.
- Died: September 14, 1948 (aged 81) Clintwood, Virginia, U.S.
- Party: Republican
- Spouse: Mary L. Chase

Roland Ephraim Chase (August 14, 1867 – September 14, 1948) was an American lawyer and Republican politician who served as a member of the Virginia Senate and House of Delegates.

== Career ==
In 1907, Chase was elected to represent the 3rd district in the Virginia Senate. He served a single term in the position. He later represented Dickenson and Wise counties in the Virginia House of Delegates from 1918 until 1922.

In 1931, he was elected to the Virginia Senate for a second time, representing the 17th district. Chase was later the Republican candidate-at-large to represent Virginia's at-large congressional seat, losing to John W. Flannagan Jr. in the election.

== Personal life ==
Chase was married with six children. He died from a heart attack on September 14, 1948.

Chase was a member of the Independent Order of Odd Fellows and was elected Grand Warden of the Virginia Grand Lodge in 1904. He served as Grand Master in 1907.

Virginia House of Delegates
Preceded by W. H. Roberts	Virginia Delegate for Dickenson and Wise; 1918–1922	Succeeded by William W. G. Dotson
Preceded by Marion K. Lowry	House Minority Leader; 1918–1920	Succeeded by Robert A. Anderson
Senate of Virginia
Preceded by R. Walter Dickenson	Virginia Senator for the 3rd District; 1908–1912	Succeeded by J. Powell Royall
Preceded by John M. Beaty	Virginia Senator for the 17th District; 1932–1936	Succeeded by Robert R. Parker
