= Senator St. Clair =

Senator St. Clair may refer to:

- Alexander St. Clair (1845–1921), Virginia State Senate
- Peyton F. St. Clair (1860–1914), Virginia State Senate
