= William H. Adams =

William H. Adams may refer to:

- Billy Adams (politician) (William Herbert Adams, 1861–1954), governor of Colorado
- William H. Adams (Virginia politician) (1872–1958)
- William Henry Adams (1809–1865), British politician, lawyer and colonial judge
