= J. Powell Royall =

American politician (1874–1945)

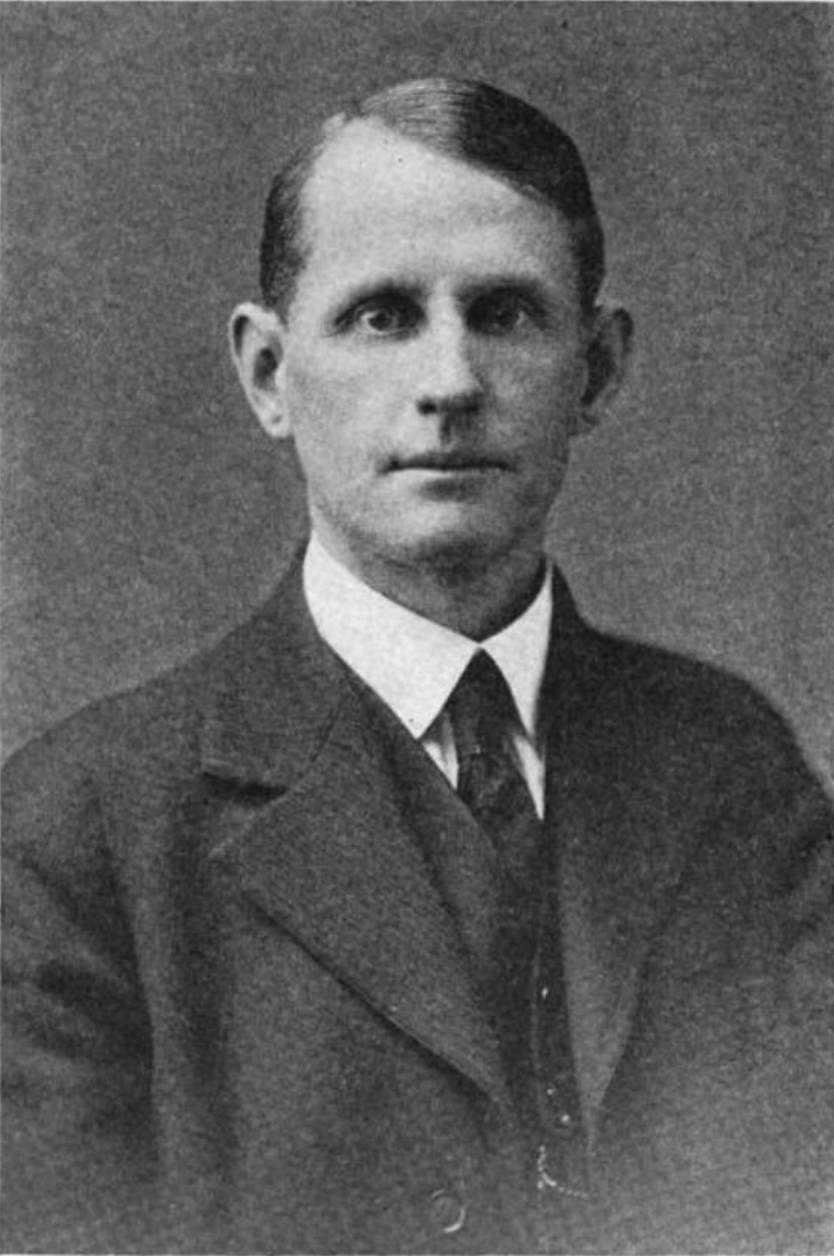

Member of the Virginia Senate from the 3rd district
- In office January 10, 1912 – January 14, 1920
- Preceded by: Roland E. Chase
- Succeeded by: Robert O. Crockett

Member of the Virginia House of Delegates for Tazewell and Buchanan
- In office January 13, 1904 – January 8, 1908
- Preceded by: William L. Moore (as Delegate for Tazewell); William B. Fulton (as Delegate for Buchanan)
- Succeeded by: Deskin Green

Personal details
- Born: John Powell Royall; June 2, 1874 Danville, Virginia, U.S.
- Died: August 14, 1945 (aged 71) Mercer, West Virginia, U.S.
- Party: Republican
- Spouse: Jennie McDonald Bowen (1905–1945)
- Education: Washington & Lee University
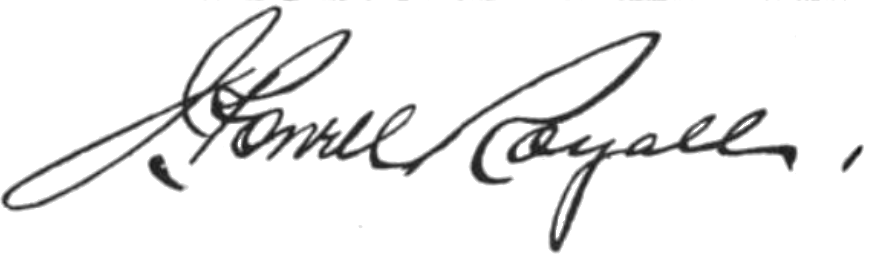
- Signature

John Powell Royall (June 2, 1874 – August 14, 1945) was an American lawyer and politician who served as a member of the Virginia Senate, representing the state's 3rd district from 1912 to 1920. He was selected as the Republican nominee for Lieutenant Governor of Virginia in 1933 and Governor of Virginia in 1937, losing both times in the general election to former state delegate James Hubert Price.

Royall's wife, Jennie McDonald Bowen came from a prominent Southwest Virginia political family. Her paternal grandfather, Rees Tate Bowen, and uncle, Henry Bowen, both served in the United States House of Representatives.

== Electoral history ==
Date	Election	Candidate	Party	Votes	%
Virginia House of Delegates, Tazewell and Buchanan
Nov 3, 1903	General	J. Powell Royall	Republican	-	-
Nov 3, 1903	General	William P. Payne	Democratic	-	-
Nov 3, 1903	General	District newly created following previous election			
Nov 7, 1905	General	J. Powell Royall (inc.)	Republican	-	-
Virginia Senate, 3rd district
Nov 7, 1911	General	J. Powell Royall	Republican	-	-
Nov 7, 1911	General	Charles R. Brown	Democratic	-	-
Nov 7, 1911	General	Roland E. Chase did not seek reelection; seat stayed Republican			
Nov 2, 1915	General	J. Powell Royall (inc.)	Republican	-	-
Nov 2, 1915	General	J. William Chapman	Democratic	-	-
Lieutenant Governor of Virginia
Nov 7, 1933	General	James H. Price (inc.)	Democratic	127,135	75.73
Nov 7, 1933	General	J. Powell Royall	Republican	37,770	22.50
Nov 7, 1933	General	J. Luther Kibler	Socialist	2,971	1.77
Governor of Virginia
Nov 2, 1937	General	James H. Price	Democratic	124,145	82.78
Nov 2, 1937	General	J. Powell Royall	Republican	23,670	15.78
Nov 2, 1937	General	Donald Burke	Communist	1,164	0.78
Nov 2, 1937	General	James A. Edgerton	Prohibition	990	0.66
Nov 2, 1937	General	George C. Peery unable to seek reelection; seat stayed Democratic			

Virginia House of Delegates
Preceded by William L. Moore	Virginia Delegate for Tazewell County; 1904–1908	Succeeded by Deskin Green
Preceded by William B. Fulton	Virginia Delegate for Buchanan County; 1904–1908	Succeeded by Deskin Green
Senate of Virginia
Preceded by Roland E. Chase	Virginia Senator for the 3rd District; 1912–1920	Succeeded by Robert O. Crockett
Party political offices
Preceded by Callom B. Jones	Republican nominee for Lieutenant Governor of Virginia; 1933	Succeeded by S. A. Reynolds
Preceded by Fred W. McWane	Republican nominee for Governor of Virginia; 1937	Succeeded by Benjamin Muse
