= Joseph C. Shaffer =

American politician (1880–1958)

United States Attorney for the Western District of Virginia
- In office 1932–1933
- President: Herbert Hoover
- Preceded by: John Paul Jr.
- Succeeded by: Joseph H. Chitwood
- In office 1924–1929
- President: Calvin Coolidge
- Preceded by: Lewis P. Summers
- Succeeded by: John Paul Jr.

Member of the U.S. House of Representatives from Virginia's 9th district
- In office March 4, 1929 – March 3, 1931
- Preceded by: George C. Peery
- Succeeded by: John W. Flannagan Jr.

Commonwealth's Attorney for Wythe County
- In office January 1, 1908 – December 31, 1911
- Preceded by: H. M. Heuser
- Succeeded by: Stuart B. Campbell

Personal details
- Born: Joseph Crockett Shaffer; January 19, 1880 Wythe County, Virginia, U.S.
- Died: October 19, 1958 (aged 78) Abingdon, Virginia, U.S.
- Party: Republican
- Education: University of Virginia (LLB)

Joseph Crockett Shaffer (January 19, 1880 – October 19, 1958) was a U.S. representative from Virginia.

== Biography ==
Born near Wytheville, Virginia, Shaffer attended the Wytheville public schools. He was graduated from Plummer College in Wytheville in 1902 and from the law department of the University of Virginia in 1904. He was admitted to the bar in 1904 and commenced practice in Wytheville. He served as Commonwealth's Attorney of Wythe County 1908-1912. He served as assistant United States district attorney in the years 1920-1924 and served as United States attorney for the western district of Virginia from 1924-1929.

Shaffer was elected as a Republican to the Seventy-first Congress (March 4, 1929–March 3, 1931). He was an unsuccessful candidate for reelection in 1930 to the Seventy-second Congress. He was reappointed United States Attorney for the Western District of Virginia, serving from 1931 until his resignation in 1932. He resumed the private practice of law. Shaffer was a stockholder and officer in Wythe County National Bank. He served as delegate to the Republican National Convention in 1940. He died in Abingdon, Virginia, and was interred in St. John's Church Cemetery, Wytheville.

== Sources ==
- United States Congress. "Joseph C. Shaffer (id: S000278)". Biographical Directory of the United States Congress.

U.S. House of Representatives
| Preceded by George C. Peery | Member of the U.S. House of Representatives from Virginia's 9th congressional district 1929–1931 | Succeeded by John W. Flannagan, Jr. |
