= Alfred C. Smith =

American politician

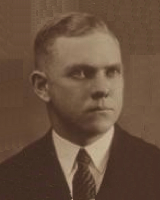

Member of the Virginia Senate from the 3rd district
- In office March 16, 1927 – January 11, 1928; January 9, 1924 – March 10, 1926
- Preceded by: Campbell C. Hyatt
- Succeeded by: Lloyd E. Warren

Member of the Virginia House of Delegates for Norfolk and South Norfolk
- In office January 11, 1922 – January 9, 1924
- Preceded by: John G. Wallace Jr.
- Succeeded by: Quinton C. Davis Jr.

Personal details
- Born: Alfred Charles Smith; October 8, 1893 Darlington, South Carolina
- Died: February 4, 1962 (aged 68) Atlanta, Georgia
- Party: Democratic
- Spouse: Alma Corrine Johnson
- Education: Wofford College

Military service
- Allegiance: United States
- Branch/service: United States Army
- Battles/wars: World War I

Alfred Charles Smith (October 8, 1893 – February 4, 1962) was an American lawyer and Democratic politician who served as a member of the Virginia Senate, representing the state's 3rd district.

An investigation was commenced in 1926 after Smith was accused of committing forgery in South Carolina and Virginia. He became the subject of expulsion hearings, and on the night of March 10, he was removed from office. One year later, Smith received the seat back and served the remainder of his term.

In August 1938, Smith was sentenced to eight years in prison following a conviction for fraudulently obtaining funds as an agent for the Mutual Benefit Life Insurance Company. He died in Atlanta in 1962.

Virginia House of Delegates
Preceded by John G. Wallace, Jr.	Virginia Delegate for Norfolk and South Norfolk; 1922–1924; Served alongside: R. A. Woods	Succeeded by Quinton C. Davis, Jr.
Senate of Virginia
Preceded by Campbell C. Hyatt	Virginia Senator for the 3rd District; 1924–1928	Succeeded by Lloyd E. Warren
