= Alexander St. Clair =

American politician

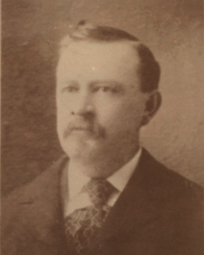

Member of the Virginia Senate from the 3rd district
- In office December 6, 1893 – December 4, 1901
- Preceded by: Charles J. Gose
- Succeeded by: John N. Harman

Personal details
- Born: Alexander St. Clair; April 17, 1845 Tazewell, Virginia, U.S.
- Died: October 21, 1921 (aged 76) Tazewell, Virginia, U.S.
- Party: Democratic
- Spouse: Maria Jane Tiffany
- Education: Roanoke College

Military service
- Allegiance: Confederate States
- Branch/service: Confederate States Army
- Years of service: 1863–1865
- Unit: 16th Virginia Cavalry
- Battles/wars: American Civil War

Alexander St. Clair (April 17, 1845 – October 21, 1921) was an American farmer, banker, and politician who served as a member of the Virginia Senate.

His home, the Alexander St. Clair House, is on the National Register of Historic Places.

Senate of Virginia
Preceded by Charles J. Gose	Virginia Senator for the 3rd District; 1893–1901	Succeeded by John N. Harman
