= William L. Moore (Virginia politician) =

American politician (1851–1926)

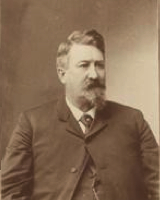

Member of the Virginia House of Delegates for Tazewell County
- In office December 4, 1901 – January 13, 1904
- Preceded by: Joseph S. Moss
- Succeeded by: J. Powell Royall
- In office December 8, 1887 – December 4, 1889
- Preceded by: James Bandy
- Succeeded by: John W. Crockett

Personal details
- Born: William Luther Moore; March 31, 1851 Tazewell, Virginia, U.S.
- Died: November 14, 1926 (aged 75) Tazewell, Virginia, U.S.
- Party: Republican
- Spouse(s): India S. Taylor; Mildred Rebecca Smith

William Luther Moore (March 31, 1851 – November 14, 1926) was an American politician who twice served as a member of the Virginia House of Delegates, representing Tazewell County.

Virginia House of Delegates
Preceded by James Bandy	Virginia Delegate for Tazewell County; 1887–1889; 1901–1904	Succeeded by John W. Crockett
Preceded by Joseph S. Moss	Virginia Delegate for Tazewell County; 1887–1889; 1901–1904	Succeeded by J. Powell Royall
