= Lloyd Earl Warren =

American politician

Member of the Virginia Senate from the 3rd district
- In office January 11, 1928 – January 13, 1932
- Preceded by: Alfred C. Smith
- Succeeded by: Major M. Hillard

Member of the Virginia House of Delegates from Portsmouth City
- In office January 13, 1926 – January 11, 1928
- Preceded by: Clarence E. Hodges
- Succeeded by: Earle A. Cadmus

Personal details
- Born: Lloyd Earl Warren; September 19, 1896 Portsmouth, Virginia, U.S.
- Died: December 5, 1934 (aged 38) Norfolk, Virginia, U.S.
- Party: Democratic
- Spouse: Ruby Lee Baker

Lloyd Earl Warren (September 19, 1896 – December 5, 1934) was an American Democratic politician who served as a member of the Virginia Senate, representing the state's 3rd district from 1928 to 1932.

Virginia House of Delegates
Preceded by Clarence E. Hodges	Virginia Delegate for Portsmouth City; 1926–1928; Served alongside: Earl H. Wright	Succeeded by Earle A. Cadmus
Senate of Virginia
Preceded by Alfred C. Smith	Virginia Senator for the 3rd District; 1928–1932	Succeeded by Major M. Hillard
