= Robert O. Crockett =

American lawyer and politician

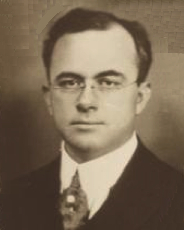

Member of the Virginia Senate from the 3rd district
- In office January 14, 1920 – January 11, 1922
- Preceded by: J. Powell Royall
- Succeeded by: Campbell C. Hyatt

Personal details
- Born: Robert Oscar Crockett; March 11, 1881 Tazewell, Virginia, U.S.
- Died: October 29, 1955 (aged 74) Tazewell, Virginia, U.S.
- Party: Republican
- Spouse: Florence Perdem Middleton
- Education: Washington & Lee University

Robert Oscar Crockett (March 11, 1881 – October 29, 1955) was an American lawyer and Republican politician who served as a member of the Virginia Senate, representing the state's 3rd district from 1920 to 1922.

Senate of Virginia
Preceded by J. Powell Royall	Virginia Senator for the 3rd District; 1920–1922	Succeeded by Campbell C. Hyatt
