= Deskin Green =

American politician (1847–1918)

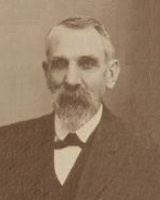

Member of the Virginia House of Delegates for Tazewell and Buchanan
- In office January 8, 1908 – January 12, 1910
- Preceded by: J. Powell Royall
- Succeeded by: John M. Ratliff

Personal details
- Born: Deskin Green; January 20, 1847 Tazewell, Virginia, U.S.
- Died: February 27, 1918 (aged 71) Tazewell, Virginia, U.S.
- Party: Republican
- Spouse: Cosby Ann Gibson

Deskin Green (January 20, 1847 – February 27, 1918) was an American politician who, from 1908 to 1910, served as a member of the Virginia House of Delegates, representing the counties of Tazewell and Buchanan.

Virginia House of Delegates
Preceded by J. Powell Royall	Virginia Delegate for Tazewell and Buchanan; 1908–1910	Succeeded by John M. Ratliff
