= October 1933 Estonian constitutional referendum =

14–16 October 1933

Results
Choice	Votes	%
Yes	416,879	72.66%
No	156,891	27.34%
Valid votes	573,770	99.56%
Invalid or blank votes	2,548	0.44%
Total votes	576,318	100.00%
Registered voters/turnout	739,416	77.94%

A constitutional referendum was held in Estonia between 14 and 16 October 1933. After two new constitutional drafts proposed by Parliament had been rejected by referendums in 1932 and June 1933, a third draft proposed by the radical right-wing Movement of Veterans of the War of Independence was approved by 72.7% of voters, with a turnout of 77.9%.

== Results ==
Choice	Votes	%
For	416,879	72.7
Against	156,891	27.3
Invalid/blank votes	2,548	–
Total	576,318	100
Registered voters/turnout	739,416	77.9
Source: Nohlen & Stöver
