= William B. Fulton (politician) =

American politician

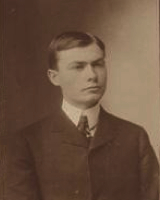

Member of the Virginia House of Delegates for Buchanan, Dickenson, and Wise
- In office December 4, 1901 – January 13, 1904
- Preceded by: Harry J. Ayers
- Succeeded by: J. Powell Royall (as Delegate for Buchanan); William A. Powers (as Delegate for Dickenson & Wise)

Personal details
- Born: William Burns Fulton; December 23, 1877 Wise, Virginia, U.S.
- Died: May 25, 1960 (aged 82) Wise, Virginia, U.S.
- Party: Democratic
- Spouse: Margaret Maiden

William Burns Fulton (December 23, 1877 – May 25, 1960) was an American Democratic politician who served as a member of the Virginia House of Delegates, representing the counties of Buchanan, Dickenson, and Wise.

Virginia House of Delegates
Preceded by Harry J. Ayers	Virginia Delegate for Buchanan County; 1901–1904	Succeeded by J. Powell Royall
Preceded by Harry J. Ayers	Virginia Delegate for Dickenson and Wise; 1901–1904	Succeeded by William A. Powers
