= Alexander St. Clair House =

Historic house in Virginia, United States

- U.S. National Register of Historic Places
- Virginia Landmarks Register
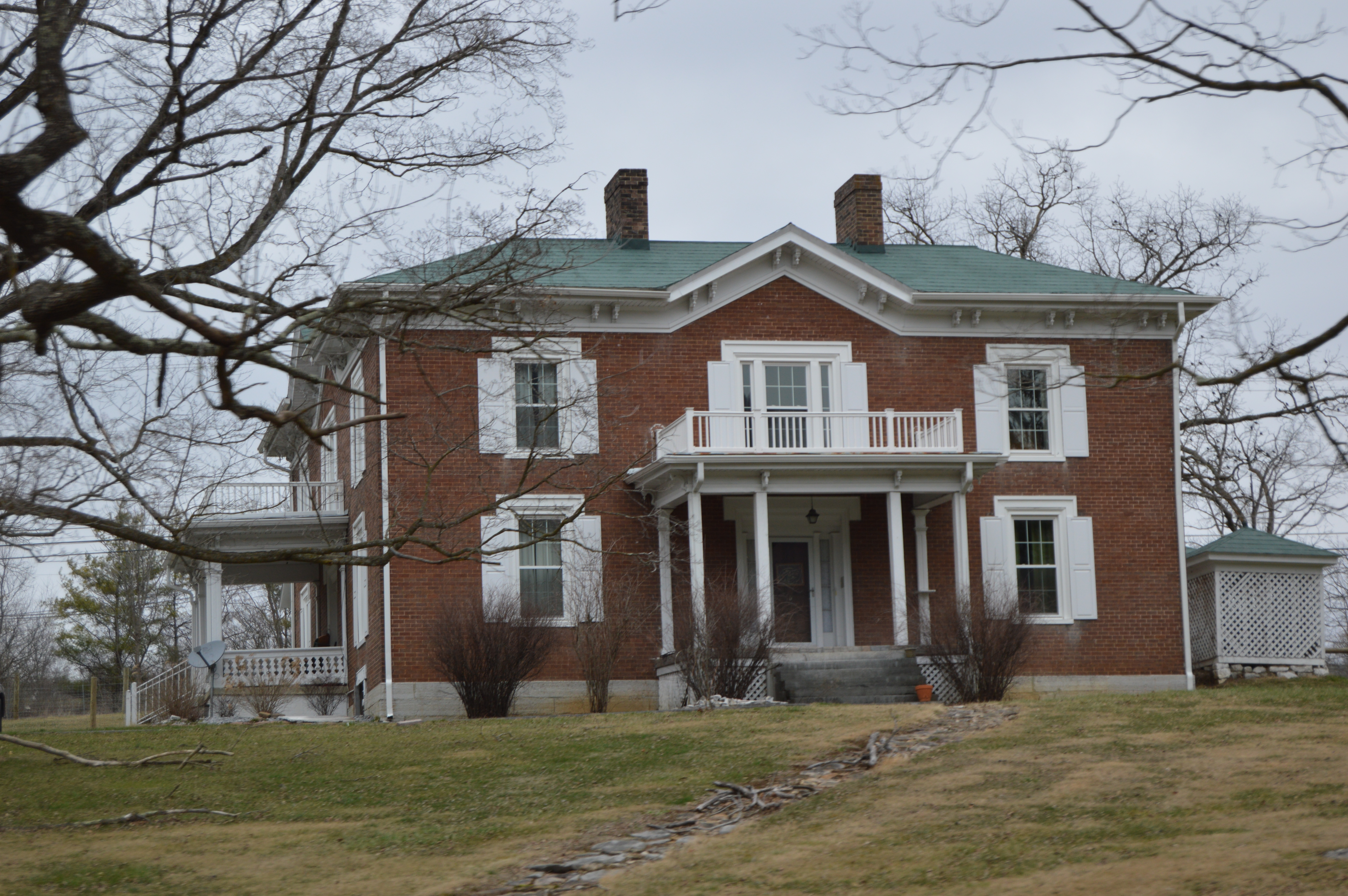
- Front of the house

- Location within Virginia Location within the United States
- Location: W of Bluefield on VA 650, Bluefield, Virginia
- Coordinates: 37°13′58″N 81°18′53″W
- Area: 9.3 acres (3.8 ha)
- Built: c. 1879
- Built by: Thomas Masten Hawkins
- Architectural style: Italianate, I-house
- NRHP reference No.: 82004606
- VLR No.: 092-0016

Significant dates
- Added to NRHP: June 28, 1982
- Designated VLR: October 21, 1980

Alexander St. Clair House, also known as the Peery House, is a historic home located near Bluefield, Virginia, Tazewell County, Virginia. It was built about 1878 for local resident Alexander St. Clair, and is a large two-story, three-bay, brick I-house dwelling with a two-story rear ell. The roof is sheathed in patterned tin shingles. The front facade features a one-bay Italianate style portico with a second floor balustrade. Associated with the main house are five contributing buildings and two contributing structures.

The home was listed on the National Register of Historic Places in 1982.
