= 1933 Virginia lieutenant gubernatorial election =

- November 7, 1933
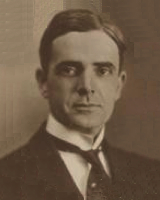

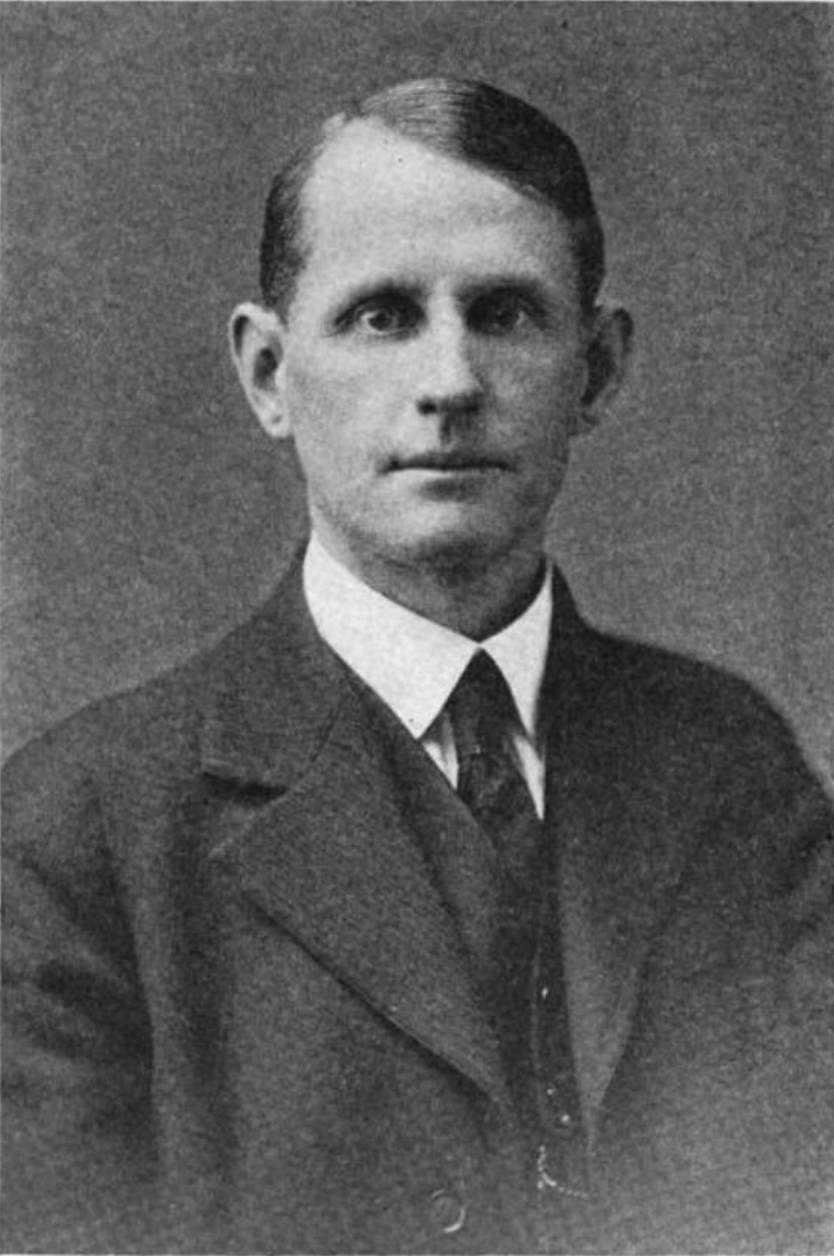
Nominee	James Hubert Price	J. Powell Royall
Party	Democratic	Republican
Popular vote	127,135	37,770
Percentage	75.73%	22.50%
- County and independent city results Price: 50–60% 60–70% 70–80% 80–90% >90% Royall: 50–60%
Lieutenant Governor before election
James Hubert Price
Democratic
Elected Lieutenant Governor
James Hubert Price
Democratic

The 1933 Virginia lieutenant gubernatorial election was held on November 7, 1933, in order to elect the lieutenant governor of Virginia. Democratic nominee and incumbent lieutenant governor James Hubert Price defeated Republican nominee and former member of the Virginia Senate J. Powell Royall and Socialist nominee J. Luther Kibler.

== General election ==
On election day, November 7, 1933, Democratic nominee James Hubert Price won re-election by a margin of 89,365 votes against his foremost opponent Republican nominee J. Powell Royall, thereby retaining Democratic control over the office of lieutenant governor. Price was sworn in for his second term on January 20, 1934.

=== Results ===
Virginia lieutenant gubernatorial election, 1933
Party	Candidate	Votes	%
Democratic	James Hubert Price (incumbent)	127,135	75.73
Republican	J. Powell Royall	37,770	22.50
Socialist	J. Luther Kibler	2,971	1.77
Total votes		167,876	100.00
Democratic hold			
