= Campbell C. Hyatt =

American lawyer and politician (1880–1945)

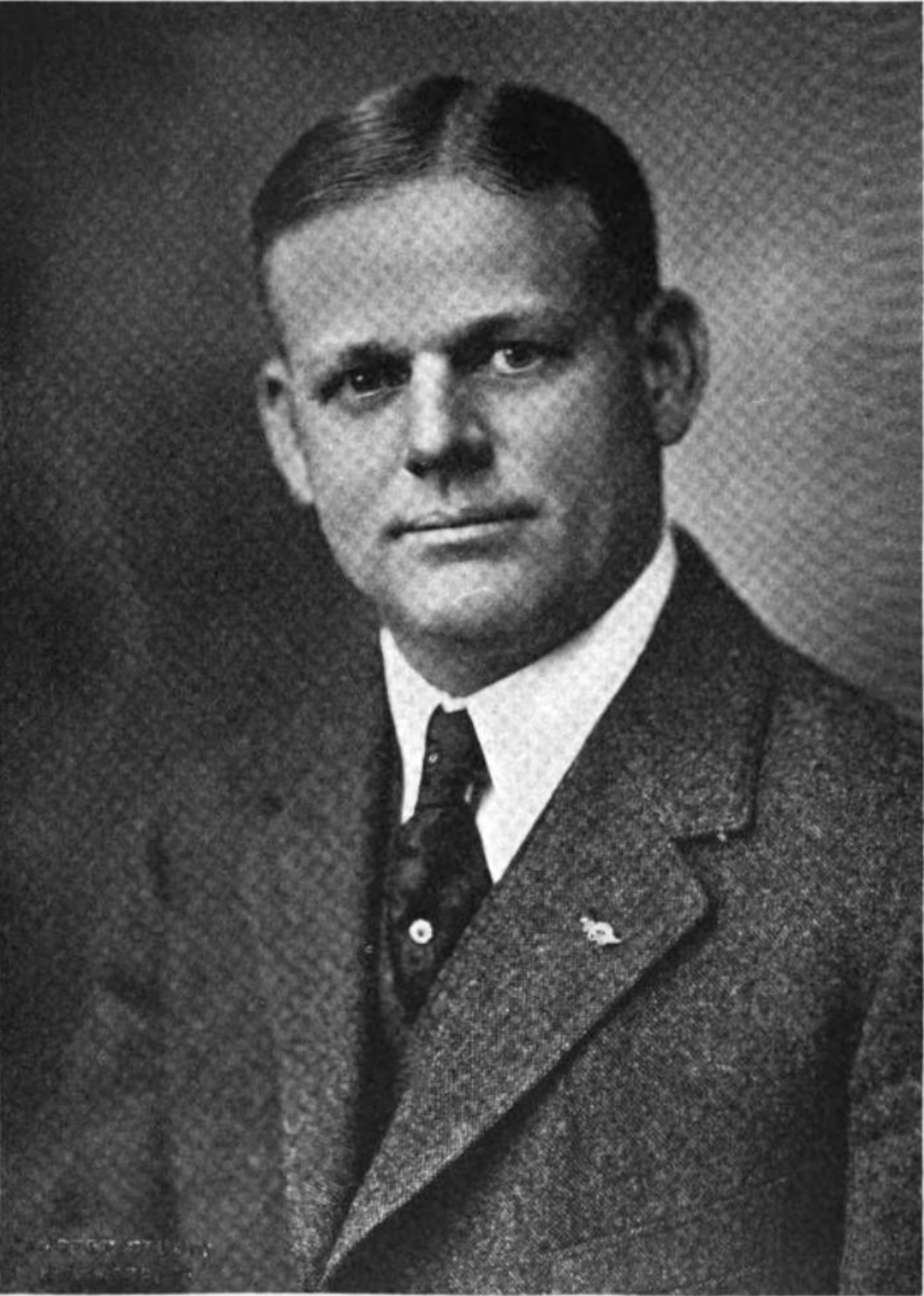
- Hyatt (c. 1924)

Member of the Virginia Senate from the 3rd district
- In office January 11, 1922 – January 9, 1924
- Preceded by: Robert O. Crockett
- Succeeded by: Alfred C. Smith

Member of the Virginia House of Delegates for Tazewell and Buchanan
- In office January 14, 1920 – January 11, 1922
- Preceded by: C. Henry Harman
- Succeeded by: John H. Stinson

Personal details
- Born: Campbell Carr Hyatt; June 8, 1880 Lee County, Virginia, U.S.
- Died: December 24, 1945 (aged 65) Richlands, Virginia, U.S.
- Resting place: Graham Family Cemetery; Wythe County, Virginia, U.S.
- Party: Republican
- Spouse: Mary Bell Robinson (m. 1906)
- Children: 5
- Occupation: Politician; lawyer; bank president; businessman
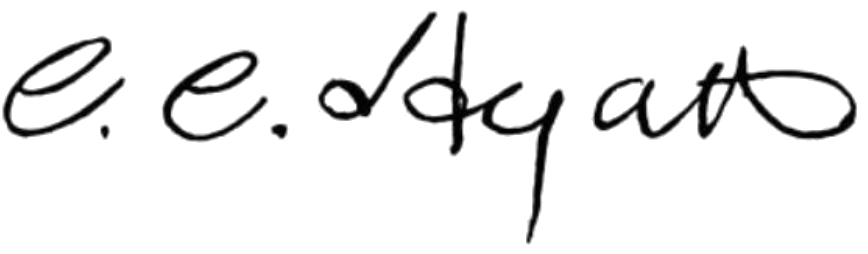
- Signature

Campbell Carr Hyatt (June 8, 1880 – December 24, 1945) was an American lawyer and Republican politician who served as a member of the Virginia Senate, representing the state's 3rd district from 1922 to 1924.

== Early life ==
Campbell Carr Hyatt was born on June 8, 1880, in Turkey Cove, Lee County, Virginia, to Eliza Ann (née Slemp) and Major John A. G. Hyatt. His father served as a clerk, treasurer and justice of the peace. Major Hyatt also served in the Civil War in the 64th Virginia Mounted Infantry Regiment. Hyatt attended public schools in Jonesville, Virginia, but left school at the age of 16 due to an accident causing a physical disability.

== Career ==
At the age of 19, Hyatt began clerking in the store of J. F. Witt at Zions Mills. He clerked there for one year. He then worked one year with his brother at the Pennington Gap Bank. Hyatt then became a cashier and bookkeeper for the Virginia Iron, Coal & Coke Company, and then worked in the life insurance business in Lee and Wise County for two years.

In 1904, Hyatt was elected cashier of the First National Bank in Norton. He served until 1909, when he was elected president of the bank. He remained in that role until 1912. On June 13, 1913, Hyatt moved to Richlands and purchased the Richland Brickyards and formed the Richland Brick Corporation. He served as president and treasurer of the company and his wife served as secretary. He retired in 1930 and leased the company to the General Shale Corporation, which he became a director of. Hyatt also served as secretary-treasurer of the Town Hill Coal Land Corporation of Richlands.

In 1919, Hyatt was elected as a Republican to the Virginia House of Delegates, representing both Tazewell and Buchanan Counties, during the 1920 session. He was then elected to the Virginia Senate from the 3rd district in 1921. In the 3rd district, he represented Buchanan, Tazewell, Dickinson and Russell Counties. He served in the Senate from 1922 to 1926.

During World War I, Hyatt was a chairman of Liberty Loan drives and was a member of the Four Minute Men.

== Personal life ==
Hyatt married Mary Bell Robinson of Wytheville, Virginia at Graham's Forge on April 10, 1906. Together, they had five children: Campbell Carr Jr., Bettie Graham, Ann, John Robinson and Mary Bell.

== Death ==
Hyatt died on December 24, 1945, of a stroke at a hospital in Richlands. He was buried at the Graham Family Cemetery in Wythe County.

Virginia House of Delegates
Preceded by C. Henry Harman	Virginia Delegate for Tazewell and Buchanan; 1920–1922	Succeeded by John H. Stinson
Senate of Virginia
Preceded by Robert O. Crockett	Virginia Senator for the 3rd District; 1922–1924	Succeeded by Alfred C. Smith
