= 1933 Virginia gubernatorial election =

- November 7, 1933
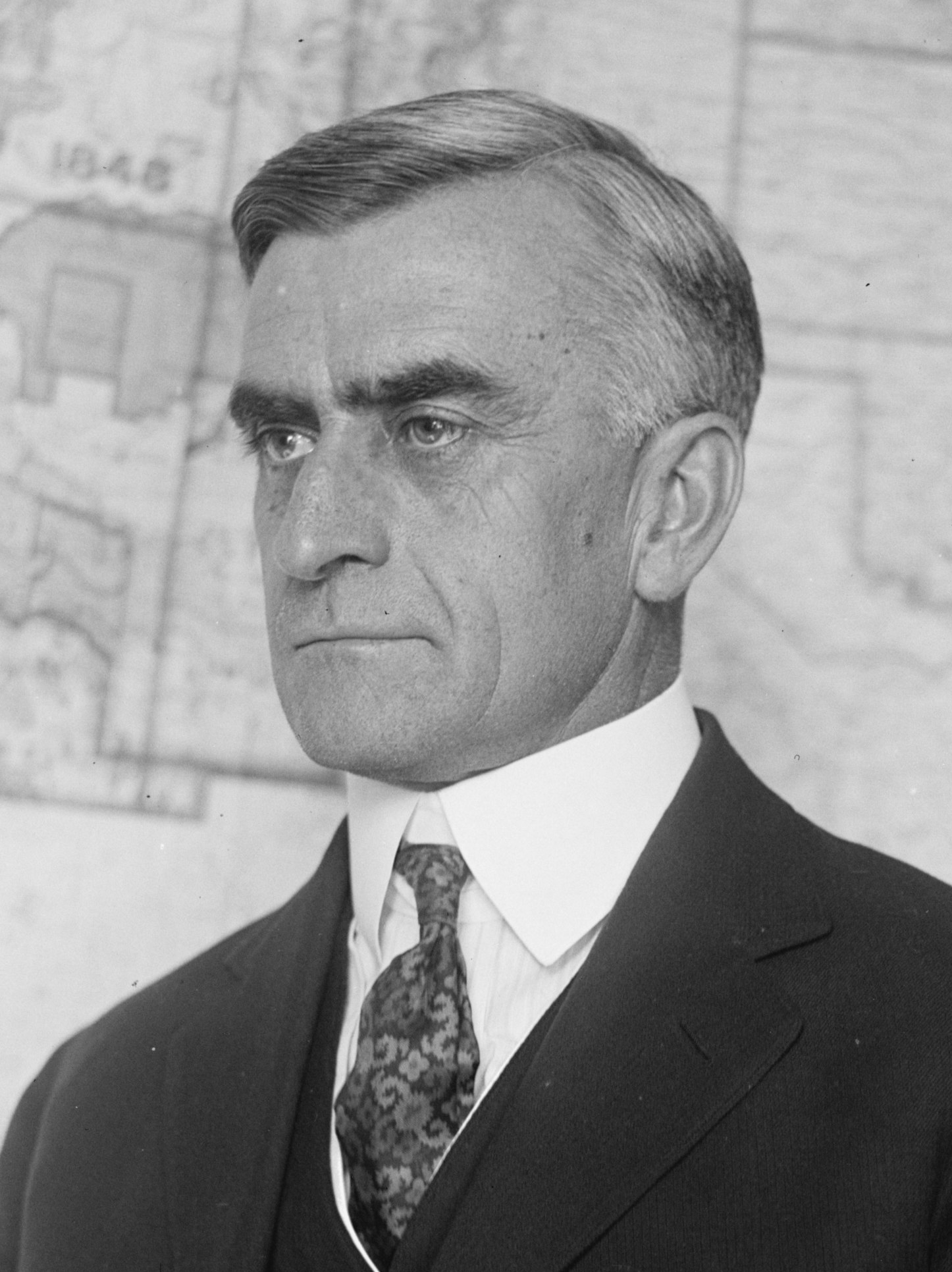

Nominee	George C. Peery	Fred W. McWane
Party	Democratic	Republican
Popular vote	122,820	40,377
Percentage	73.74%	24.24%
- County and independent city results Peery: 50–60% 60–70% 70–80% 80–90% >90% McWane: 50–60%
Governor before election
John Garland Pollard
Democratic
Elected Governor
George C. Peery
Democratic

The 1933 Virginia gubernatorial election was held on November 7, 1933, to elect the governor of Virginia.

== Background ==
The 1900s had seen Virginia, like all former Confederate States, almost completely disenfranchise its black and poor white populations through the use of a cumulative poll tax and literacy tests. So severe was the disenfranchising effect of the new 1902 Constitution that it has been calculated that a third of those who voted were state employees and officeholders.

This limited electorate made post-disenfranchisement Virginian politics controlled by a political machine based in Southside Virginia and led by Thomas Staples Martin until his death in 1919. Progressive "antiorganization" factions were rendered impotent by the inability of almost all their potential electorate to vote. Unlike the Deep South, historical fusion with the "Readjuster" Democrats, defection of substantial proportions of the Northeast-aligned white electorate of the Shenandoah Valley and Southwest Virginia over free silver, and an early move towards a "lily white" Jim Crow party meant Republicans retained a small but permanent number of legislative seats and local offices in the western part of the state, although in many areas – like in Tennessee during the same era – the parties avoided competition by an agreed division over local offices.

Following the final challenge to hard lily-white control of the state GOP, the small number of black voters in the state were excluded from turning to the rival Democrats by a 1924 party ruling that only qualified whites could vote in the primary. This produced a series of court cases that would see Virginia's white primary permanently invalidated in 1930 without a Supreme Court challenge.

=== Establishment of the Byrd machine ===
Whilst the state's white primary was challenged in federal court, Harry Flood Byrd, first elected Democratic central committee chairman in 1922, would be elected Governor in 1925 and implement significant reforms, most importantly a "short ballot" which reduced the number of elected officials to three. (Note: These were Governor, Lieutenant Governor, and Attorney General.) Byrd's coattails would allow John Garland Pollard to be elected Governor despite the divisions caused by opposition to Al Smith in the 1928 presidential election. Pollard's win confirmed Byrd's supremacy within Virginia politics, although he had a reputation for independence and was not closely identified with Byrd and his organization.

As Byrd would, except for the "Hundred Days" at the beginning of FDR's first presidential term, always cling to his belief in limited government or "pay-as-you-go", he would support as next Governor George C. Peery, whom he had previously helped "redeem" the "Fighting Ninth" congressional district in 1922. Peery would overwhelm his various opponents, and this election solidified a trend for the small turnout to be even less at the general election than at the Democratic primary.

== Democratic primary ==
=== Candidates ===
- George Campbell Peery, member of the State Corporation Commission from Tazewell County
- Joseph T. Deal, former Representative for the Second Congressional District from Norfolk
- W. Worth Smith, State Senator from Louisa

1933 Virginia Democratic gubernatorial primary
Party	Candidate	Votes	%	±%
Democratic	George C. Peery	116,837	61.62%	
Democratic	Joseph T. Deal	40,268	21.25%	
Democratic	W. Worth Smith	32,518	17.15%	
Majority		76,569	40.38%	
Turnout		189,623		
Democratic hold		Swing		

== General election ==
=== Candidates ===
- Andrew J. Dunning (Prohibition), from Norfolk
- Fred W. McWane, Republican Party State Secretary from Lynchburg (Republican)
- George C. Peery, member of the State Corporation Commission and former U.S. Representative from Tazewell (Democratic)
- John Moffett Robinson (Independent), from Fincastle
- W. A. Rowe (Independent) from Blackwells
- George C. White (Socialist)

=== Results ===
1933 Virginia gubernatorial election
Party	Candidate	Votes	%
Democratic	George C. Peery	122,820	73.74%
Republican	Fred W. McWane	40,377	24.24%
Prohibition	Andrew J. Dunning	1,112	0.67%
Socialist	George C. White	1,107	0.67%
Independent	John Moffett Robinson	877	0.53%
Independent	W. A. Rowe	274	0.16%
Total votes		166,567	100.00%
Democratic hold			

==== Results by county or independent city ====
1933 Virginia gubernatorial election by county or independent city
	George C. Peery Democratic		Fred W. McWane Republican		Andrew J. Dunning Prohibition		George C. White Socialist		John M. Robinson Independent		W.A. Rowe Independent		Margin		Total votes cast
	#	%	#	%	#	%	#	%	#	%	#	%	#	%	Total votes cast
Accomack County	919	86.45%	136	12.79%	6	0.56%	2	0.19%	0	0.00%	0	0.00%	783	73.66%	1,063
Albemarle County	1,225	86.39%	162	11.42%	10	0.71%	14	0.99%	7	0.49%	0	0.00%	1,063	74.96%	1,418
Alleghany County	534	55.86%	387	40.48%	7	0.73%	14	1.46%	11	1.15%	3	0.31%	147	15.38%	956
Amelia County	396	73.88%	135	25.19%	0	0.00%	3	0.56%	1	0.19%	1	0.19%	261	48.69%	536
Amherst County	713	85.90%	109	13.13%	1	0.12%	4	0.48%	2	0.24%	1	0.12%	604	72.77%	830
Appomattox County	846	84.85%	131	13.14%	17	1.71%	0	0.00%	3	0.30%	0	0.00%	715	71.72%	997
Arlington County	2,041	68.95%	846	28.58%	13	0.44%	34	1.15%	20	0.68%	6	0.20%	1,195	40.37%	2,960
Augusta County	1,634	68.03%	668	27.81%	66	2.75%	12	0.50%	15	0.62%	7	0.29%	966	40.22%	2,402
Bath County	325	65.26%	162	32.53%	2	0.40%	7	1.41%	2	0.40%	0	0.00%	163	32.73%	498
Bedford County	1,030	81.81%	216	17.16%	12	0.95%	1	0.08%	0	0.00%	0	0.00%	814	64.65%	1,259
Bland County	660	58.93%	453	40.45%	0	0.00%	4	0.36%	3	0.27%	0	0.00%	207	18.48%	1,120
Botetourt County	974	67.17%	418	28.83%	2	0.14%	1	0.07%	55	3.79%	0	0.00%	556	38.34%	1,450
Brunswick County	566	98.61%	5	0.87%	2	0.35%	1	0.17%	0	0.00%	0	0.00%	561	97.74%	574
Buchanan County	778	67.71%	365	31.77%	1	0.09%	2	0.17%	2	0.17%	1	0.09%	413	35.94%	1,149
Buckingham County	376	86.84%	50	11.55%	3	0.69%	3	0.69%	1	0.23%	0	0.00%	326	75.29%	433
Campbell County	752	82.28%	158	17.29%	3	0.33%	0	0.00%	1	0.11%	0	0.00%	594	64.99%	914
Caroline County	493	86.49%	65	11.40%	8	1.40%	3	0.53%	1	0.18%	0	0.00%	428	75.09%	570
Carroll County	1,057	47.83%	1,117	50.54%	2	0.09%	10	0.45%	22	1.00%	2	0.09%	-60	-2.71%	2,210
Charles City County	118	89.39%	11	8.33%	2	1.52%	0	0.00%	1	0.76%	0	0.00%	107	81.06%	132
Charlotte County	481	88.10%	58	10.62%	2	0.37%	3	0.55%	2	0.37%	0	0.00%	423	77.47%	546
Chesterfield County	641	75.77%	149	17.61%	34	4.02%	15	1.77%	5	0.59%	2	0.24%	492	58.16%	846
Clarke County	621	93.81%	41	6.19%	0	0.00%	0	0.00%	0	0.00%	0	0.00%	580	87.61%	662
Craig County	318	65.03%	166	33.95%	3	0.61%	0	0.00%	1	0.20%	1	0.20%	152	31.08%	489
Culpeper County	732	77.30%	203	21.44%	7	0.74%	3	0.32%	1	0.11%	1	0.11%	529	55.86%	947
Cumberland County	227	90.08%	18	7.14%	5	1.98%	1	0.40%	1	0.40%	0	0.00%	209	82.94%	252
Dickenson County	1,493	74.95%	485	24.35%	2	0.10%	2	0.10%	8	0.40%	2	0.10%	1,008	50.60%	1,992
Dinwiddie County	484	92.72%	26	4.98%	7	1.34%	4	0.77%	0	0.00%	1	0.19%	458	87.74%	522
Elizabeth City County	717	83.47%	111	12.92%	13	1.51%	12	1.40%	0	0.00%	6	0.70%	606	70.55%	859
Essex County	209	90.09%	21	9.05%	0	0.00%	2	0.86%	0	0.00%	0	0.00%	188	81.03%	232
Fairfax County	1,483	77.16%	387	20.14%	14	0.73%	24	1.25%	11	0.57%	3	0.16%	1,096	57.02%	1,922
Fauquier County	1,143	90.71%	112	8.89%	2	0.16%	2	0.16%	1	0.08%	0	0.00%	1,031	81.83%	1,260
Floyd County	451	39.70%	680	59.86%	0	0.00%	2	0.18%	2	0.18%	1	0.09%	-229	-20.16%	1,136
Fluvanna County	357	86.86%	43	10.46%	4	0.97%	2	0.49%	4	0.97%	1	0.24%	314	76.40%	411
Franklin County	1,411	82.37%	290	16.93%	3	0.18%	2	0.12%	6	0.35%	1	0.06%	1,121	65.44%	1,713
Frederick County	1,052	77.64%	298	21.99%	0	0.00%	1	0.07%	3	0.22%	1	0.07%	754	55.65%	1,355
Giles County	1,170	65.40%	602	33.65%	2	0.11%	2	0.11%	11	0.61%	2	0.11%	568	31.75%	1,789
Gloucester County	486	85.87%	66	11.66%	7	1.24%	5	0.88%	1	0.18%	1	0.18%	420	74.20%	566
Goochland County	344	82.69%	61	14.66%	5	1.20%	3	0.72%	2	0.48%	1	0.24%	283	68.03%	416
Grayson County	1,601	48.44%	1,679	50.80%	4	0.12%	8	0.24%	8	0.24%	5	0.15%	-78	-2.36%	3,305
Greene County	227	60.21%	146	38.73%	0	0.00%	0	0.00%	3	0.80%	1	0.27%	81	21.49%	377
Greensville County	235	87.36%	32	11.90%	1	0.37%	0	0.00%	1	0.37%	0	0.00%	203	75.46%	269
Halifax County	1,663	95.52%	68	3.91%	2	0.11%	3	0.17%	2	0.11%	3	0.17%	1,595	91.61%	1,741
Hanover County	702	84.27%	112	13.45%	5	0.60%	12	1.44%	2	0.24%	0	0.00%	590	70.83%	833
Henrico County	1,661	66.47%	766	30.65%	6	0.24%	57	2.28%	9	0.36%	0	0.00%	895	35.81%	2,499
Henry County	657	78.40%	166	19.81%	5	0.60%	5	0.60%	3	0.36%	2	0.24%	491	58.59%	838
Highland County	280	52.43%	249	46.63%	2	0.37%	1	0.19%	1	0.19%	1	0.19%	31	5.81%	534
Isle of Wight County	528	85.30%	83	13.41%	3	0.48%	3	0.48%	1	0.16%	1	0.16%	445	71.89%	619
James City County	129	77.25%	34	20.36%	3	1.80%	0	0.00%	0	0.00%	1	0.60%	95	56.89%	167
King and Queen County	163	80.30%	28	13.79%	9	4.43%	2	0.99%	0	0.00%	1	0.49%	135	66.50%	203
King George County	204	67.33%	92	30.36%	3	0.99%	0	0.00%	0	0.00%	4	1.32%	112	36.96%	303
King William County	305	81.99%	60	16.13%	5	1.34%	1	0.27%	1	0.27%	0	0.00%	245	65.86%	372
Lancaster County	364	78.79%	94	20.35%	2	0.43%	0	0.00%	2	0.43%	0	0.00%	270	58.44%	462
Lee County	1,638	70.66%	636	27.44%	6	0.26%	5	0.22%	27	1.16%	6	0.26%	1,002	43.23%	2,318
Loudoun County	1,145	84.44%	189	13.94%	17	1.25%	5	0.37%	0	0.00%	0	0.00%	956	70.50%	1,356
Louisa County	898	79.47%	203	17.96%	8	0.71%	15	1.33%	4	0.35%	2	0.18%	695	61.50%	1,130
Lunenburg County	478	90.02%	38	7.16%	0	0.00%	10	1.88%	3	0.56%	2	0.38%	440	82.86%	531
Madison County	499	57.22%	364	41.74%	1	0.11%	1	0.11%	7	0.80%	0	0.00%	135	15.48%	872
Mathews County	343	55.32%	267	43.06%	7	1.13%	2	0.32%	1	0.16%	0	0.00%	76	12.26%	620
Mecklenburg County	568	90.73%	43	6.87%	12	1.92%	1	0.16%	1	0.16%	1	0.16%	525	83.87%	626
Middlesex County	294	82.12%	40	11.17%	15	4.19%	2	0.56%	5	1.40%	2	0.56%	254	70.95%	358
Montgomery County	1,335	59.07%	883	39.07%	14	0.62%	12	0.53%	13	0.58%	3	0.13%	452	20.00%	2,260
Nansemond County	453	93.21%	29	5.97%	3	0.62%	1	0.21%	0	0.00%	0	0.00%	424	87.24%	486
Nelson County	1,058	84.84%	167	13.39%	6	0.48%	2	0.16%	11	0.88%	3	0.24%	891	71.45%	1,247
New Kent County	106	69.74%	42	27.63%	0	0.00%	2	1.32%	2	1.32%	0	0.00%	64	42.11%	152
Norfolk County	1,665	85.43%	234	12.01%	23	1.18%	11	0.56%	9	0.46%	7	0.36%	1,431	73.42%	1,949
Northampton County	565	85.61%	87	13.18%	5	0.76%	3	0.45%	0	0.00%	0	0.00%	478	72.42%	660
Northumberland County	287	78.85%	70	19.23%	0	0.00%	0	0.00%	0	0.00%	7	1.92%	217	59.62%	364
Nottoway County	538	84.46%	70	10.99%	24	3.77%	2	0.31%	2	0.31%	1	0.16%	468	73.47%	637
Orange County	671	83.88%	122	15.25%	3	0.38%	1	0.13%	3	0.38%	0	0.00%	549	68.63%	800
Page County	1,383	77.22%	380	21.22%	7	0.39%	11	0.61%	9	0.50%	1	0.06%	1,003	56.00%	1,791
Patrick County	1,005	73.95%	319	23.47%	3	0.22%	2	0.15%	28	2.06%	2	0.15%	686	50.48%	1,359
Pittsylvania County	1,505	82.15%	306	16.70%	14	0.76%	4	0.22%	1	0.05%	2	0.11%	1,199	65.45%	1,832
Powhatan County	259	85.48%	35	11.55%	0	0.00%	9	2.97%	0	0.00%	0	0.00%	224	73.93%	303
Prince Edward County	531	90.77%	47	8.03%	2	0.34%	2	0.34%	2	0.34%	1	0.17%	484	82.74%	585
Prince George County	202	80.16%	37	14.68%	7	2.78%	5	1.98%	1	0.40%	0	0.00%	165	65.48%	252
Prince William County	656	79.90%	150	18.27%	8	0.97%	1	0.12%	5	0.61%	1	0.12%	506	61.63%	821
Princess Anne County	802	81.75%	156	15.90%	13	1.33%	5	0.51%	2	0.20%	3	0.31%	646	65.85%	981
Pulaski County	1,728	81.47%	385	18.15%	5	0.24%	1	0.05%	1	0.05%	1	0.05%	1,343	63.32%	2,121
Rappahannock County	401	91.76%	34	7.78%	1	0.23%	0	0.00%	1	0.23%	0	0.00%	367	83.98%	437
Richmond County	192	75.00%	60	23.44%	2	0.78%	0	0.00%	0	0.00%	2	0.78%	132	51.56%	256
Roanoke County	1,359	59.01%	891	38.69%	19	0.83%	18	0.78%	15	0.65%	1	0.04%	468	20.32%	2,303
Rockbridge County	1,092	76.63%	316	22.18%	7	0.49%	1	0.07%	8	0.56%	1	0.07%	776	54.46%	1,425
Rockingham County	2,228	62.22%	1,257	35.10%	60	1.68%	11	0.31%	23	0.64%	2	0.06%	971	27.12%	3,581
Russell County	2,367	75.19%	757	24.05%	3	0.10%	4	0.13%	17	0.54%	0	0.00%	1,610	51.14%	3,148
Scott County	1,311	52.95%	1,113	44.95%	5	0.20%	8	0.32%	29	1.17%	10	0.40%	198	8.00%	2,476
Shenandoah County	2,133	63.48%	1,189	35.39%	10	0.30%	12	0.36%	11	0.33%	5	0.15%	944	28.10%	3,360
Smyth County	1,709	56.85%	1,260	41.92%	5	0.17%	13	0.43%	13	0.43%	6	0.20%	449	14.94%	3,006
Southampton County	510	88.54%	51	8.85%	9	1.56%	4	0.69%	1	0.17%	1	0.17%	459	79.69%	576
Spotsylvania County	492	69.49%	181	25.56%	10	1.41%	6	0.85%	9	1.27%	10	1.41%	311	43.93%	708
Stafford County	281	60.30%	174	37.34%	1	0.21%	3	0.64%	4	0.86%	3	0.64%	107	22.96%	466
Surry County	285	92.23%	19	6.15%	3	0.97%	1	0.32%	0	0.00%	1	0.32%	266	86.08%	309
Sussex County	289	90.31%	25	7.81%	5	1.56%	1	0.31%	0	0.00%	0	0.00%	264	82.50%	320
Tazewell County	2,067	62.92%	1,176	35.80%	10	0.30%	9	0.27%	15	0.46%	8	0.24%	891	27.12%	3,285
Warren County	799	80.14%	189	18.96%	3	0.30%	2	0.20%	3	0.30%	1	0.10%	610	61.18%	997
Warwick County	189	75.60%	55	22.00%	1	0.40%	5	2.00%	0	0.00%	0	0.00%	134	53.60%	250
Washington County	2,046	68.87%	875	29.45%	12	0.40%	8	0.27%	23	0.77%	7	0.24%	1,171	39.41%	2,971
Westmoreland County	352	85.85%	53	12.93%	1	0.24%	2	0.49%	0	0.00%	2	0.49%	299	72.93%	410
Wise County	3,958	83.03%	775	16.26%	5	0.10%	13	0.27%	13	0.27%	3	0.06%	3,183	66.77%	4,767
Wythe County	1,491	58.96%	1,013	40.06%	5	0.20%	4	0.16%	14	0.55%	2	0.08%	478	18.90%	2,529
York County	206	71.78%	60	20.91%	20	6.97%	1	0.35%	0	0.00%	0	0.00%	146	50.87%	287
Alexandria City	2,469	77.86%	584	18.42%	28	0.88%	39	1.23%	37	1.17%	14	0.44%	1,885	59.44%	3,171
Bristol City	978	90.72%	94	8.72%	2	0.19%	1	0.09%	3	0.28%	0	0.00%	884	82.00%	1,078
Buena Vista City	337	71.55%	120	25.48%	3	0.64%	3	0.64%	7	1.49%	1	0.21%	217	46.07%	471
Charlottesville City	749	86.89%	91	10.56%	10	1.16%	11	1.28%	1	0.12%	0	0.00%	658	76.33%	862
Clifton Forge City	763	60.08%	466	36.69%	8	0.63%	13	1.02%	18	1.42%	2	0.16%	297	23.39%	1,270
Danville City	1,582	81.80%	267	13.81%	34	1.76%	27	1.40%	17	0.88%	7	0.36%	1,315	67.99%	1,934
Fredericksburg City	721	79.06%	172	18.86%	6	0.66%	3	0.33%	4	0.44%	6	0.66%	549	60.20%	912
Hampton City	469	90.89%	39	7.56%	3	0.58%	2	0.39%	1	0.19%	2	0.39%	430	83.33%	516
Harrisonburg City	1,111	64.78%	576	33.59%	13	0.76%	0	0.00%	11	0.64%	4	0.23%	535	31.20%	1,715
Hopewell City	597	76.05%	153	19.49%	2	0.25%	28	3.57%	2	0.25%	3	0.38%	444	56.56%	785
Lynchburg City	2,166	68.87%	967	30.75%	5	0.16%	6	0.19%	1	0.03%	0	0.00%	1,199	38.12%	3,145
Martinsville City	715	80.88%	147	16.63%	14	1.58%	2	0.23%	4	0.45%	2	0.23%	568	64.25%	884
Newport News City	2,359	80.07%	466	15.82%	15	0.51%	77	2.61%	15	0.51%	14	0.48%	1,893	64.26%	2,946
Norfolk City	3,930	79.65%	840	17.02%	85	1.72%	45	0.91%	26	0.53%	8	0.16%	3,090	62.63%	4,934
Petersburg City	873	86.44%	110	10.89%	17	1.68%	8	0.79%	2	0.20%	0	0.00%	763	75.54%	1,010
Portsmouth City	2,268	77.41%	558	19.04%	42	1.43%	33	1.13%	27	0.92%	2	0.07%	1,710	58.36%	2,930
Radford City	618	60.77%	391	38.45%	1	0.10%	4	0.39%	0	0.00%	3	0.29%	227	22.32%	1,017
Richmond City	6,814	81.82%	1,236	14.84%	44	0.53%	177	2.13%	42	0.50%	15	0.18%	5,578	66.98%	8,328
Roanoke City	5,264	67.49%	2,381	30.53%	26	0.33%	72	0.92%	48	0.62%	9	0.12%	2,883	36.96%	7,800
South Norfolk City	1,066	84.94%	157	12.51%	7	0.56%	12	0.96%	6	0.48%	7	0.56%	909	72.43%	1,255
Staunton City	890	75.74%	227	19.32%	20	1.70%	10	0.85%	27	2.30%	1	0.09%	663	56.43%	1,175
Suffolk City	633	89.28%	68	9.59%	6	0.85%	1	0.14%	1	0.14%	0	0.00%	565	79.69%	709
Williamsburg City	145	88.96%	16	9.82%	2	1.23%	0	0.00%	0	0.00%	0	0.00%	129	79.14%	163
Winchester City	958	69.88%	409	29.83%	0	0.00%	2	0.15%	2	0.15%	0	0.00%	549	40.04%	1,371
Totals	122,820	73.74%	40,377	24.24%	1,112	0.67%	1,107	0.66%	877	0.53%	274	0.16%	82,443	49.50%	166,567

Counties and independent cities that flipped from Republican to Democratic

- Scott
- Wythe
- Smyth
- Tazewell
- Bland
- Montgomery
- Salem
- Alleghany
- Bath
- Mathews
- York
- Shenadoah
- Greene
- Fairfax
- Arlington
