= Thomas B. Fugate =

American politician

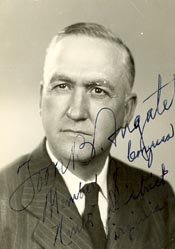

Member of the U.S. House of Representatives from Virginia's 9th district
- In office January 3, 1949 – January 3, 1953
- Preceded by: John W. Flannagan Jr.
- Succeeded by: William C. Wampler

Member of the Virginia House of Delegates from Lee County
- In office January 11, 1928 – January 8, 1930
- Preceded by: F. R. Stickley
- Succeeded by: John J. Reasor

Personal details
- Born: Thomas Bacon Fugate; April 10, 1899 Claiborne County, Tennessee, U.S.
- Died: September 22, 1980 (aged 81) Ewing, Virginia, U.S.
- Party: Democratic
- Spouse: Lillian Oretta Rowlett
- Education: University of Tennessee; Lincoln Memorial University

Thomas Bacon Fugate (April 10, 1899 – September 22, 1980) was an American businessman, banker, farmer and politician. He served in the United States representative from Virginia in the Eighty-first and Eighty-second Congresses. Fugate was elected to Congress as a Democrat.

== Early life ==
Thomas Fugate was born on April 10, 1899, on a farm near Tazewell, in Claiborne County, Tennessee. He attended public schools before pursuing higher education at the University of Tennessee and Lincoln Memorial University. In 1918, he married Lillian Rowlett, a union that produced five children. Soon after, Fugate moved his family to Ewing, Virginia, to pursue his business interests. Like his father, Thomas Fugate's business focused on banking, trade and farming.

== Politics and later pursuits ==
Without being asked, Fugate was nominated as a Democratic candidate for the Virginia House of Delegates. He served in the House for one term, from 1928 to 1930. After leaving office, Fugate continued to take on a variety of business positions, including president of the Peoples Bank of Ewing, director of the Virginia-Tennessee Farm Bureau, and president of the Ewing Live Stock Company.

Fugate's interest in politics remained strong, and in 1945 he was selected as a member of the Virginia Constitutional Convention. He had also become a successful campaign manager for local Congressman John Flanagan. When Flanagan decided to retire in 1948, Fugate was selected as the Democratic nominee to replace him. He was subsequently elected to the Eighty-first and Eighty-second Congresses on behalf of the 9th Virginia district.

As a Congressman, Fugate's main achievement was for legislation he sponsored in regard to the operations of the Panama Canal, for which he received commendations from the army and the United States President. With his banking experience, Fugate also selected to the Banking and Currency Committee and helped to oversee the loans made by the Export-Import Bank. However, Fugate was also accused of being a member of the powerful Byrd political machine.

Fugate chose not to stand for a third term in Congress, instead returning to his farming and business interests in Ewing. However, he continued to serve in various high-profile positions, including more than twenty years on the board of trustees for Lincoln Memorial University and as a member of the Virginia Agricultural Stabilization and Conservation Committee.

Fugate died on September 22, 1980, at the age of 81.

U.S. House of Representatives
Preceded by John W. Flannagan, Jr.	Member of the U.S. House of Representatives from Virginia's 9th congressional district 1949–1953	Succeeded by William C. Wampler
