= William H. Adams (Virginia politician) =

American politician (1872–1958)

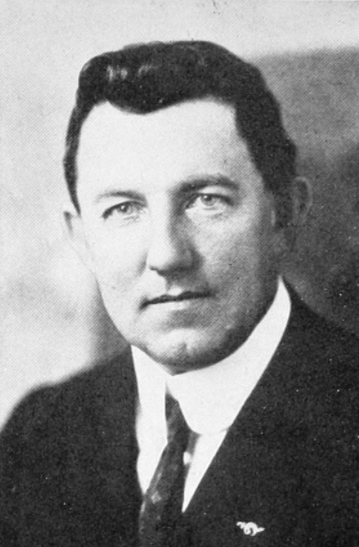

Member of the Virginia House of Delegates from Richmond City
- In office January 8, 1930 – January 13, 1954
- Preceded by: James H. Price
- Succeeded by: Charles H. Phillips

Personal details
- Born: William Harrison Adams; March 23, 1872 Richmond, Virginia, U.S.
- Died: September 24, 1958 (aged 85) Richmond, Virginia, U.S.
- Resting place: Oakwood Cemetery
- Party: Democratic
- Spouse: Ivy Longworth

William Harrison Adams (March 23, 1872 – September 24, 1958) was an American politician who served in the Virginia House of Delegates.

He died in Richmond on September 24, 1958, and was buried at Oakwood Cemetery.
