= Blackwells, Virginia =

Unincorporated community in Virginia, US

Coordinates: 37°51′15″N 76°21′26″W

Blackwells is an unincorporated community in Northumberland County, in the U.S. state of Virginia.
