= 1933 Greek presidential election =

- October 19, 1933
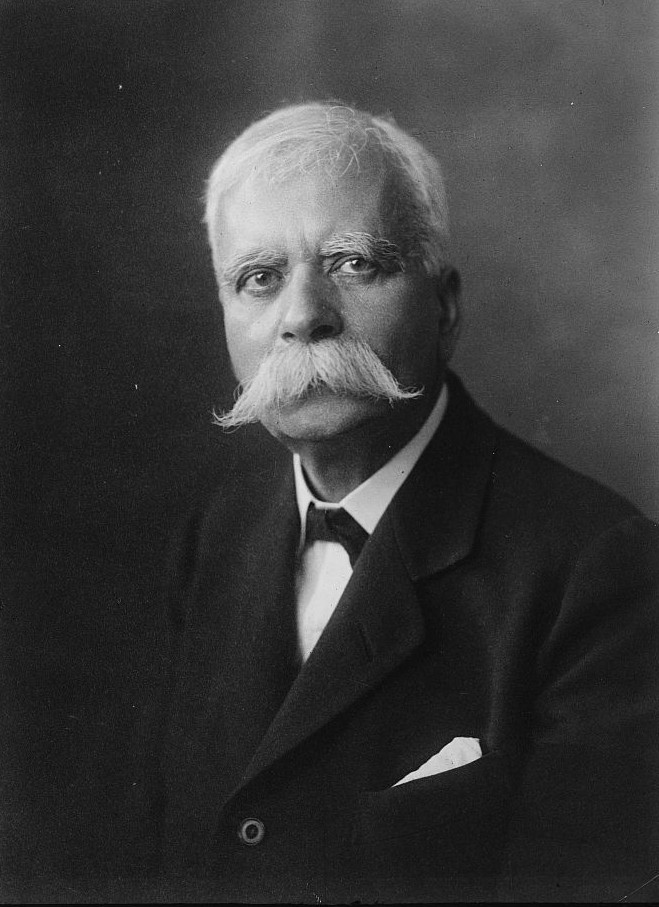
Nominee	Alexandros Zaimis
Party	Independent
Electoral vote	197
Percentage	59.88%
President before election
Alexandros Zaimis
Independent
Elected President
Alexandros Zaimis
Independent

Indirect presidential elections were held in Greece on October 19, 1933. The president was elected by the Greek Parliament and Senate.

Incumbent president Alexandros Zaimis was re-elected and sworn in for his second term the same day. It marked the first time a sitting president had been re-elected and would become the last presidential election of the Second Hellenic Republic before the restoration of the Greek monarchy in 1935.

== Results ==
Candidate	Party	Votes	%
Alexandros Zaimis	Independent	197	59.88
Scattering		132	40.12
Total		329	100.00
