= John N. Harman =

American politician (1854–1934)

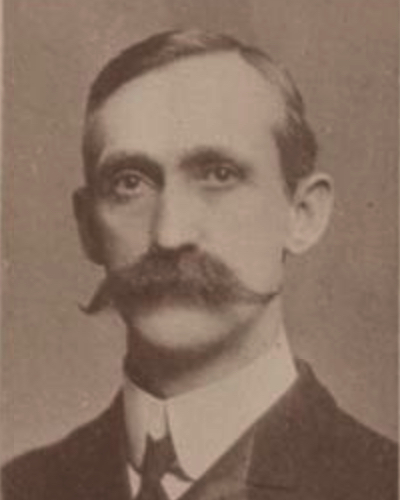

Member of the Virginia Senate from the 3rd district
- In office December 4, 1901 – January 10, 1906
- Preceded by: Alexander St. Clair
- Succeeded by: R. Walter Dickenson

Commonwealth's Attorney for Tazewell County
- In office 1883–1890

Personal details
- Born: John Newton Harman; June 10, 1854
- Died: September 21, 1934 (aged 80) Tazewell, Virginia, U.S.
- Party: Republican
- Spouse: Bettie Hankins

John Newton Harman Sr. (June 10, 1854 – September 21, 1934) was an American politician who served as a member of the Virginia Senate.

He was a founder and teacher at Tazewell College and publisher of a newspaper called The Primitive Baptist.

Senate of Virginia
Preceded by Alexander St. Clair	Virginia Senator for the 3rd District; 1901–1906	Succeeded by R. Walter Dickenson
