= Virginia's 3rd Senate district =

American legislative district

Virginia's 3rd State Senate district
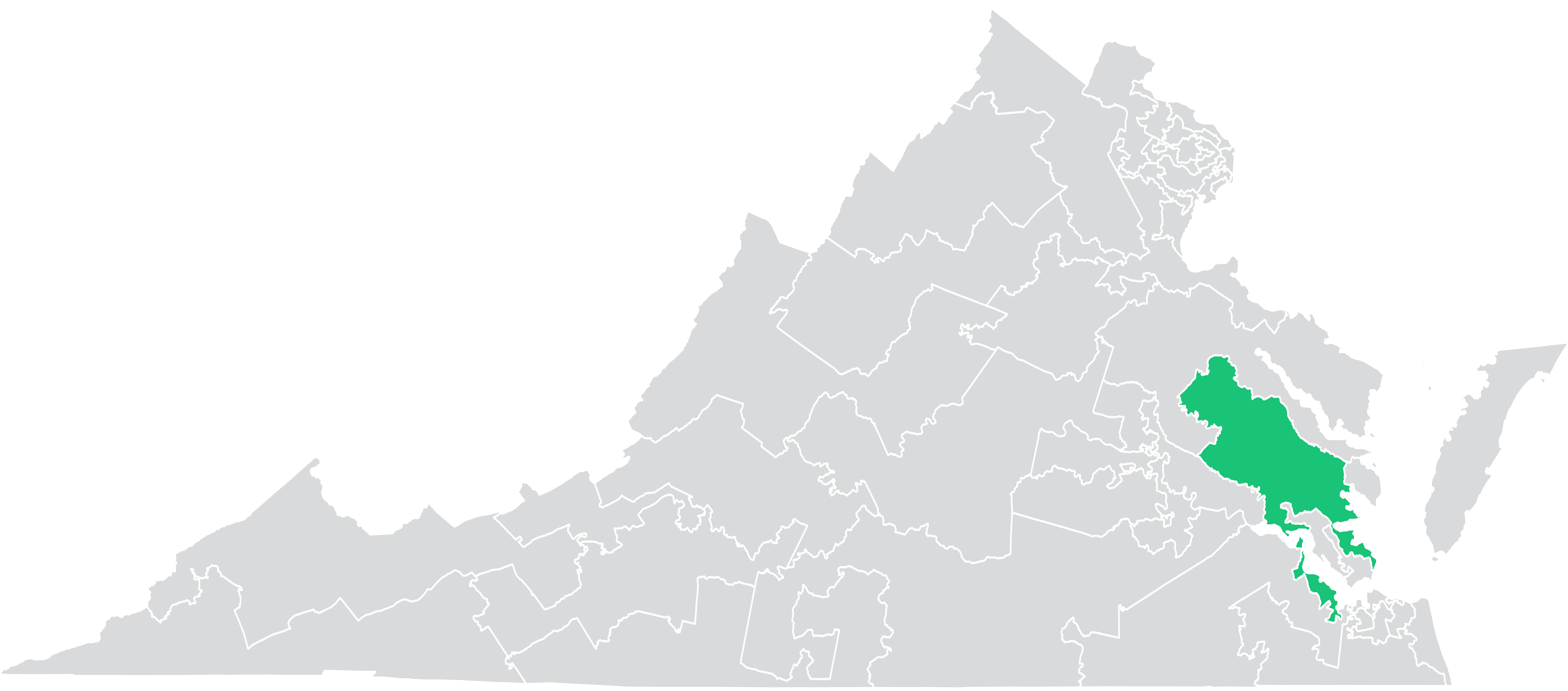
Senator
Chris Head; R–Roanoke
- Demographics: 85% White; 6% Black; 4% Hispanic; 0% Asian; 1% Native American; 0% Hawaiian/Pacific Islander; 4% Other
- Population (2023): 211,842
- Registered voters: 156,338

Virginia's 3rd Senate district is one of 40 districts in the Senate of Virginia. After redistricting in 2023, it has been represented by Republican Chris Head since 2024.

== Geography ==
District 3 is located in west-central Virginia, including the counties of Alleghany, Botetourt, Craig, Rockbridge, and portions of Augusta and Roanoke. The independent cities that are part of District 3 include Buena Vista, Covington, Lexington, Staunton, and Waynesboro.

The district overlaps with Virginia's 6th and 9th congressional districts, and with the 36th, 37th, 39th, 40th, and 41st districts of the Virginia House of Delegates.

== Recent election results ==
=== 2019 ===
2019 Virginia Senate election, District 3
Party	Candidate	Votes	%
Republican	Tommy Norment (incumbent)	50,448	61.7
Democratic	Herbert Jones Jr.	31,056	38.0
Total votes		81,776	100
Republican hold			

=== 2015 ===
2015 Virginia Senate election, District 3
Party	Candidate	Votes	%
Republican	Tommy Norment (incumbent)	35,520	69.7
Democratic	Hugo Reyes	15,432	30.3
Total votes		50,952	100
Republican hold			

=== 2011 ===
2011 Virginia Senate election, District 3
Primary election
Party	Candidate	Votes	%
Republican	Tommy Norment (incumbent)	11,400	73.0
Republican	Mark Frechette	4,089	26.2
Total votes		15,617	100
General election
Republican	Tommy Norment (incumbent)	38,665	96.5
Total votes		40,136	100
Republican hold			

=== Federal and statewide results ===
Year	Office	Results
2020	President	Trump 61.6–36.6%
2017	Governor	Gillespie 60.0–39.0%
2016	President	Trump 61.1–33.8%
2014	Senate	Gillespie 61.0–36.8%
2013	Governor	Cuccinelli 57.7–34.7%
2012	President	Romney 62.6–36.1%
2012	Senate	Allen 61.3–38.7%

== Historical results ==
All election results below took place prior to 2011 redistricting, and thus were under different district lines.

=== 2007 ===
2007 Virginia Senate election, District 3
Party	Candidate	Votes	%
Republican	Tommy Norment (incumbent)	29,699	95.1
Total votes		31,200	100
Republican hold			

=== 2003 ===
2003 Virginia Senate election, District 3
Primary election
Party	Candidate	Votes	%
Republican	Tommy Norment (incumbent)	10,470	62.3
Republican	Paul Jost	6,340	37.7
Total votes		16,810	100
General election
Republican	Tommy Norment (incumbent)	21,309	65.5
Democratic	Mary Minor	11,080	34.1
Total votes		32,520	100
Republican hold			

=== 1999 ===
1999 Virginia Senate election, District 3
Party	Candidate	Votes	%
Republican	Tommy Norment (incumbent)	24,916	62.9
Democratic	Lynwood Lewis	14,611	36.9
Total votes		39,595	100
Republican hold			

=== 1995 ===
1995 Virginia Senate election, District 3
Party	Candidate	Votes	%
Republican	Tommy Norment (incumbent)	32,667	99.3
Total votes		32,904	100
Republican hold			

== District officeholders since 1904 ==
Years	Senator, District 3	Counties/Cities in District
1904–1906	John N. Harman (R)	Buchanan County, Dickenson County, Russell County, and Tazewell County
1906–1908	R. Walter Dickenson (R)	Buchanan County, Dickenson County, Russell County, and Tazewell County
1908–1912	Roland E. Chase (R)	Buchanan County, Dickenson County, Russell County, and Tazewell County
1912–1916	J. Powell Royall (R)	Buchanan County, Dickenson County, Russell County, and Tazewell County
1916–1920	J. Powell Royall (R)	Buchanan County, Dickenson County, Russell County, and Tazewell County
1920–1922	Robert O. Crockett (R)	Buchanan County, Dickenson County, Russell County, and Tazewell County
1922–1924	Campbell C. Hyatt (R)	Buchanan County, Dickenson County, Russell County, and Tazewell County
1924–1928	Alfred C. Smith (D)	Norfolk County, City of Portsmouth and the City of South Norfolk
1928–1932	Lloyd E. Warren (D)	Norfolk County, City of Portsmouth and the City of South Norfolk
1932–1936	Major M. Hillard (D)	Norfolk County, City of Portsmouth and the City of South Norfolk
1936–1940	Major M. Hillard (D)	Norfolk County, City of Portsmouth and the City of South Norfolk
1940–1944	Major M. Hillard (D)	Norfolk County, City of Portsmouth and the City of South Norfolk
1944–1948	Major M. Hillard (D)	Norfolk County, City of Portsmouth and the City of South Norfolk
1948–1952	Major M. Hillard (D)	Norfolk County, City of Portsmouth and the City of South Norfolk
1952–1956	Major M. Hillard (D)	Norfolk County, City of Portsmouth and the City of South Norfolk
1956–1960	Gordon F. Marsh (D)	Norfolk County and the City of South Norfolk
1960–1964	Gordon F. Marsh (D)	Norfolk County and the City of South Norfolk
1964–1966	Gordon F. Marsh (D)	Norfolk County and the City of South Norfolk
1966	William B. Spong (D)	City of Portsmouth, City of Chesapeake and the City of Virginia Beach
1966–1972	William H. Hodges (D)	City of Portsmouth, City of Chesapeake and the City of Virginia Beach
1972–1976	William E. Fears (D)	Accomac County, James City County, Northampton County, York County and the cities of Williamsburg and Newport News (part)
1976–1980	William E. Fears (D)	Accomac County, James City County, Northampton County, York County and the cities of Williamsburg, Poquoson and Newport News (part)
1980–1984	William E. Fears (D)	Accomac County, James City County, Northampton County, York County and the cities of Williamsburg, Poquoson and Newport News (part)
1984–1988	William E. Fears (D)	Accomac County, James City County, Northampton County, York County and the cities of Williamsburg, Poquoson and Newport News (part)
1988–1992	William E. Fears (D)	Accomac County, James City County, Northampton County, York County and the cities of Williamsburg, Poquoson and Newport News (part)
1992–1996	Tommy Norment (R)	Gloucester County, James City County, New Kent County, City of Newport News (part), City of Williamsburg and York County (part)
1996–2000	Tommy Norment (R)	Gloucester County, James City County, New Kent County, City of Newport News (part), City of Williamsburg and York County (part)
2000–2004	Tommy Norment (R)	Gloucester County, James City County, New Kent County, City of Newport News (part), City of Williamsburg and York County (part)
2004–2008	Tommy Norment (R)	Gloucester County, James City County, New Kent County, City of Newport News (part), City of Williamsburg and York County (part)
2008–2012	Tommy Norment (R)	Gloucester County, James City County, New Kent County, City of Newport News (part), City of Williamsburg and York County (part)
2012–2016	Tommy Norment (R)	Gloucester County, King & Queen County, King William County, New Kent County, City of Poquoson, Isle of Wight County (part), James City County (part), Surry County (part), York County (part), City of Hampton (part), City of Suffolk (part)
2016–present	Tommy Norment (R)	Gloucester County, King & Queen County, King William County, New Kent County, City of Poquoson, Isle of Wight County (part), James City County (part), Surry County (part), York County (part), City of Hampton (part), City of Suffolk (part)
