= James Hubert Price =

American politician (1878–1943)

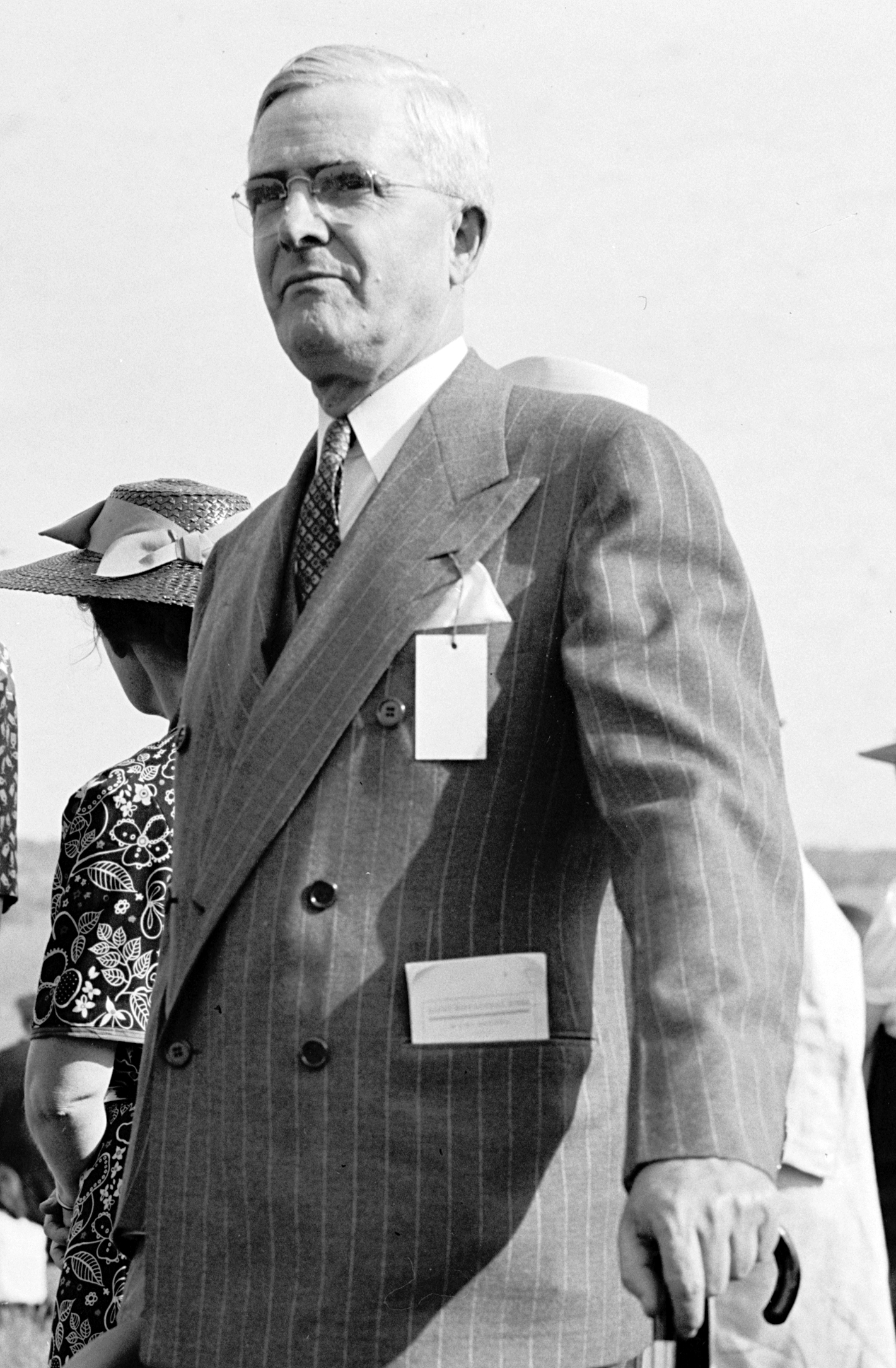

53rd Governor of Virginia
- In office January 19, 1938 – January 21, 1942
- Lieutenant: Saxon W. Holt
- Preceded by: George C. Peery
- Succeeded by: Colgate Darden

23rd Lieutenant Governor of Virginia
- In office January 15, 1930 – January 19, 1938
- Governor: John G. Pollard; George C. Peery
- Preceded by: Junius E. West
- Succeeded by: Saxon W. Holt

Member of the Virginia House of Delegates from Richmond City
- In office January 12, 1916 – January 15, 1930
- Preceded by: Edwin P. Cox
- Succeeded by: William H. Adams

Personal details
- Born: James Hubert Price; September 7, 1878 Greenbrier County, West Virginia, U.S.
- Died: November 22, 1943 (aged 65) Richmond, Virginia, U.S.
- Party: Democratic
- Spouse: Lillian Martin
- Children: 2
- Education: Washington and Lee University

James Hubert Price (September 7, 1878 – November 22, 1943) was an American politician who was elected 53rd Governor of Virginia in 1937, during the Great Depression and became known as the Commonwealth's "New Deal Governor." Over the opposition of the Byrd Organization, Price, a Virginia attorney and businessman, passed many social programs and implemented other federal programs to benefit Virginians. Price had previously represented Richmond as one of its delegates in the Virginia House of Delegates for over a decade (1916–1930), as well as served as Lieutenant Governor for two terms beginning in 1930.

== Early and family life ==
Price was born near Organ Cave in Greenbrier County, West Virginia to Charles William Price and Nancy C. Boone, both of Lewisburg, West Virginia. His parents moved to Staunton, Virginia, where he was raised and where his closest relatives lived by the time World War I began. Price attended and received a business degree from Dunsmore Business College in 1898. He then taught accounting at the college and established his own accounting practice. In 1907 he began legal studies at the Washington and Lee Law School and graduated in 1909.

On October 2, 1918, about a month after the 37-year-old registered for the draft (having become a legal adviser to local draft boards), he married Lilian Martin in Washington, D.C. They had two children: James Price (1920–1991) and Lillian Price Eberle (1925–2016). Price was very active in the Freemasons and Shriners fraternal organizations, serving as Grand Master of the Grand Lodge of Virginia Masons (1922 to 1924) and as Imperial Recorder for the Ancient Arabic Order of Nobles of the Mystic Shrine for North America from 1927 until his death.

== Career ==
Upon admission to the Virginia bar, Price began legal practice in Staunton, but soon moved to Richmond, Virginia in 1910, where he practiced corporate law.

In 1916, he won the first of what became seven terms in the Virginia House of Delegates as one of five delegates representing Richmond. That year marked a major turnover in Richmond's delegation: only Edward R. Fuller who had been selected to fill the term of the deceased D. L. Toney, was re-elected from the 1914 Richmond house delegation. Price served alongside Fuller until 1928. He also served alongside James P. Jones and Albert Orlando Boschen for several terms, and for lesser periods alongside Richard W. Carrington, Graham B. Hobson, William M. Myers, T. Gray Haddon, George Luther Wilcox, Charles W. Crowder, J. Fulmer Bright, James R. Sheppard Jr., Elben C. Folkes, J. Vaughan Gary and S.S.P. Patterson in the Richmond delegation to various General Assembly sessions.

Virginia voters elected Price Lieutenant Governor in 1929 (the state's 23rd). As the Great Depression began, Price could soon see that Governor John G. Pollard, a member of the Byrd Organization selected by Harry F. Byrd as his successor, was cutting state employees' salaries rather than taking advantage of the programs created by President Franklin D. Roosevelt, although a fellow Democrat.

Price could not secure Byrd's support to run for governor in 1933. Instead Byrd selected former Congressman and State Corporation Commission member George C. Peery, who agreed with Byrd's "pay as you go" government funding philosophy. Price again won re-election as lieutenant governor unopposed.

In the 1937 general election, Price made known he would run with or without organizational support. He became the Democratic candidate and won 82.78% of the vote. He defeated Republican candidate John Powell Royall (a former State Senator), as well as Communist Donald Burke, and Prohibitionist James A. Edgerton.

As governor, Price secured the support of anti-Byrd forces including Francis Pickens Miller in the 1938 session in order to pass social legislation in the Virginia General Assembly. He also created public works projects (including a new buildings for the Library of Virginia, Virginia Supreme Court, and the Medical College of Virginia), implemented the Social Security Act, solicited federal funds for urban development, and advocated the inclusion of African Americans in the U.S. military, as well as prepared Virginia for what became World War II. Price also helped rename two of the state's teachers' colleges Mary Washington University and James Madison University. Various labor measures were also advocated by Price during his time as governor.

Price fired top Byrd lieutenant Everett R. Combs as state Comptroller and chairman of the Compensation board, incurring Byrd's wrath. While historian Douglas Southall Freeman labeled Price's 1940 legislative agenda one of the best on record, the Byrd Organization refused to pass such legislation until 1942, as Price left office due to the single term limit in the state Constitution and was succeeded by Colgate Darden.

== Death and legacy ==
After his governorship ended, Price continued active with the Shriners as well as sold war bonds, but suffered a stroke about a year later. He died in Richmond on November 22, 1943. He (and four months later his wife Lilian) was buried at Staunton's Thornrose Cemetery.

== Electoral history ==
Date	Election	Candidate	Party	Votes	%
Lieutenant Governor of Virginia
Nov 5, 1929	General	James H. Price	Democratic	184,563	64.01
Nov 5, 1929	General	Callom B. Jones	Republican	103,758	35.99
Nov 5, 1929	General	Junius E. West did not seek reelection; seat stayed Democratic			
Nov 7, 1933	General	James H. Price (inc.)	Democratic	127,135	75.73
Nov 7, 1933	General	J. Powell Royall	Republican	37,770	22.50
Nov 7, 1933	General	J. Luther Kibler	Socialist	2,971	1.77
Governor of Virginia
Nov 2, 1937	General	James H. Price	Democratic	124,145	82.78
Nov 2, 1937	General	J. Powell Royall	Republican	23,670	15.78
Nov 2, 1937	General	Donald Burke	Communist	1,164	0.78
Nov 2, 1937	General	James A. Edgerton	Prohibition	990	0.66
Nov 2, 1937	General	George C. Peery unable to seek reelection; seat stayed Democratic			

Political offices
Preceded by Junius E. West	Lieutenant Governor of Virginia; 1930–1938	Succeeded by Saxon W. Holt
Preceded by George C. Peery	Governor of Virginia; 1938–1942	Succeeded by Colgate Darden
Party political offices
Preceded by Junius E. West	Democratic nominee for Lieutenant Governor of Virginia; 1929, 1933	Succeeded by Saxon W. Holt
Preceded by George C. Peery	Democratic nominee for Governor of Virginia; 1937	Succeeded by Colgate Darden
