= John W. Flannagan Jr. =

American politician

Member of the U.S. House of Representatives from Virginia's 9th district
- In office March 4, 1931 – January 3, 1949 at-large: March 4, 1933 – January 3, 1935
- Preceded by: Joseph C. Shaffer
- Succeeded by: Thomas B. Fugate

Chairman of the House Committee on Agriculture
- In office January 3, 1945 – January 3, 1947
- Preceded by: Hampton P. Fulmer
- Succeeded by: Clifford R. Hope

Personal details
- Born: John William Flannagan Jr. February 20, 1885 Trevilians, Virginia
- Died: April 27, 1955 (aged 70) Bristol, Virginia
- Party: Democratic
- Education: Washington and Lee University
- Profession: Attorney

John William Flannagan Jr. (February 20, 1885 – April 27, 1955) was an American politician of the Democratic Party. He represented Virginia in the United States House of Representatives from 1931 - 1949. The John W Flannagan Dam is named after him.

== Early life and career ==
Flannagan born on a farm near Trevilians, in Louisa County, Virginia. He earned a law degree from Washington and Lee University in 1907 and was admitted to the bar the same year. He practiced law for several years, before becoming the Commonwealth's attorney for Buchanan County, Virginia in 1916 and 1917. After that, Flannagan continued the practice of law, but also engaged in banking from 1917 to 1930.

== Politics and later life ==
Flannagan was subsequently elected as a Democrat to the 72nd Congress and to the eight succeeding Congresses (March 4, 1931 – January 3, 1949). He was the chairman of Committee on Agriculture (Seventy-eighth and Seventy-ninth Congresses), and the congressional adviser to the first session of the Food and Agriculture Organization of the United Nations at Quebec in 1945. Flannagan was not a candidate for renomination in 1948, and he resumed the practice of law in Bristol, Virginia until his death there April 27, 1955. He is interred in Mountain View Cemetery.

U.S. House of Representatives
Preceded by Joseph C. Shaffer	Member of the U.S. House of Representatives from Virginia's 9th congressional district 1931–1933	Succeeded by District abolished Himself after district re-established in 1935
Preceded by District re-established John S. Wise before district eliminated in 1885	Member of the U.S. House of Representatives from Virginia's at-large congressional seat 1933 – 1935	Succeeded by District abolished
Preceded by District re-established Himself before district abolished in 1933	Member of the U.S. House of Representatives from Virginia's 9th congressional district 1935–1949	Succeeded by Thomas B. Fugate
Political offices
Preceded by Hampton P. Fulmer	Chairman of the House Agriculture Committee; 1945–1947	Succeeded by Clifford R. Hope
