= George C. Peery =

American politician

George Peery
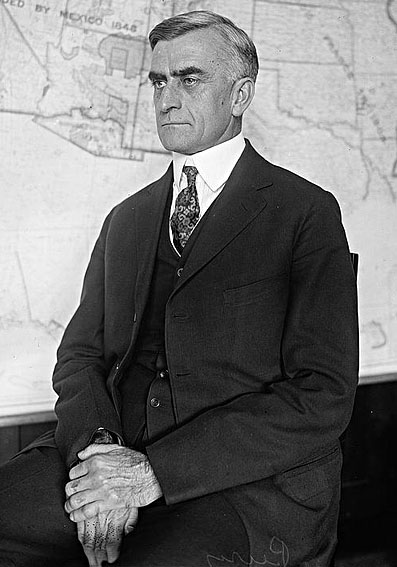

52nd Governor of Virginia
- In office January 18, 1934 – January 15, 1938
- Preceded by: John Pollard
- Succeeded by: James Price

Chair of the National Governors Association
- In office November 16, 1936 – September 14, 1937
- Preceded by: Paul V. McNutt
- Succeeded by: Roy Cochran

Member of the State Corporation Commission
- In office November 29, 1929 – April 17, 1933
- Preceded by: Louis S. Epes
- Succeeded by: Thomas W. Ozlin

Member of the U.S. House of Representatives from Virginia's 9th district
- In office March 4, 1923 – March 4, 1929
- Preceded by: C. Bascom Slemp
- Succeeded by: Joseph Shaffer

Personal details
- Born: George Campbell Peery; October 28, 1873 Cedar Bluff, Virginia, U.S.
- Died: October 14, 1952 (aged 78) Richlands, Virginia, U.S.
- Resting place: Maplewood Cemetery; 37°07′37″N 81°31′11″W
- Party: Democratic
- Spouse: Nancy Bane Gillespie
- Children: 3
- Education: Emory and Henry College (BA); Washington and Lee University (LLB)
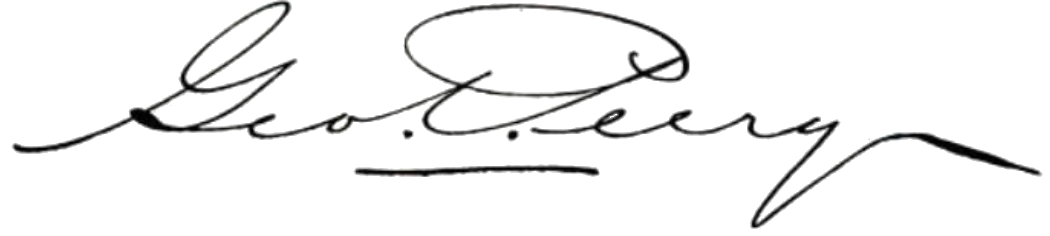
- Signature

George Campbell Peery (October 28, 1873 – October 14, 1952) was a Virginia lawyer, school principal and Democratic politician, who served as the 52nd governor of Virginia from 1934 to 1938, after serving three terms in the U.S. House of Representatives, as well as on the State Corporation Commission. Sometimes called the second governor selected (at least partially), by the soon to be very powerful Byrd Organization, led by former Virginia Governor and later multi-term Senator Harry F. Byrd, Sr. Peery was also the first Virginia governor from southwest Virginia, and noted his descent from early settlers of the Clinch Valley.

== Early life and education ==
Peery was born in Cedar Bluff, in Tazewell County, Virginia, in the far southwest portion of the state. Ancestors had settled in the area after the American Revolutionary War., (Note: In 1788, another George Peery and William Peery had been assignees of treasury warrants on 100 acres of land adjoining the Clinch River, as well as land assigned to John Peery, Mathias Harman and Thomas Peery. Later that year, George as William's assignee filed another treasury warrant for 250 acres on the Maiden Spring Fork of the Clinch River. Then in early 1789 George filed a patent for another 40 acres adjoining one of his properties. Various Peerys also filed patents for land at the foot of Rich Mountain and around Puncheon Camp and Clinch Mountain in the fall of 1789.) and Dr. Andrew Peery had served as in the Virginia House of Delegates in 1805-1807, and several relatives in the War of 1812. His father, Dr. James Peery, had been a surgeon in Derrick's Battalion of the Confederate States Army. He attended local schools while working on his father's farm and at the family store as well as the Tazewell County Clerk's office. He later noted his experience at collecting debts for his father and uncle, beginning when he was twelve years old, and his first salaried job as assistant clerk in the Tazewell County clerk's office at $25 per month. Peery attended the local public schools before attending Emory & Henry College in slightly less rural Washington County, and graduated in 1894, winning medals in oratory and science. Peery, although only twenty years old, then became principal of Tazewell High School for two years, before resigning and traveling to earn his LL.B. degree from Washington & Lee University in 1897 after a single year's study (although most students needed two years to complete it).

In 1907 he married Nancy Bane Gillespie, daughter of a prominent Tazewell attorney and Republican politician, Albert P. Gillespie, who had been a delegate to the Virginia Constitutional Convention of 1902. They had three children, Albert G. Peery (born 1908), George C. Peery, Jr. (born 1910), and Nancy Peery Whitley (born 1916). Peery was also the lay leader of the Main Street Methodist Church in Tazewell, where W.P. Eastwood was pastor.

== Career ==
Peery then returned to far Southwestern Virginia to practice law, first setting up a practice in Tazewell when admitted to the Virginia bar in 1897, where he later noted that he earned exactly $200 in his first twelve months of private legal practice. He decided to specialize in title work, expanding his practice to nearby Wise and Dickinson County as well as eastern Kentucky, and eventually moved to Wise, Virginia. He returned to Tazewell in 1915 to settle his father in law's estate and soon joined Gillespie's former partners A.C. Buchanan and Archibald C. Chapman to form Chapman, Peery, and Buchanan. He also began political involvement, chosen as Democratic elector at large on the Wilson-Marshall ticket in 1916 and in 1920 became chairman of the Ninth District Democratic committee.

In 1922, voters in Virginia's 9th congressional district elected Peery to the United States House of Representatives. He succeeded C. Bascom Slemp, who had not sought re-election and thus became the last Republican to serve in Virginia's congressional delegation for decades. Peery defeated Republican John H. Hassinger, and two years later defeated Republican C. Henry Harman. Peery's victory was considered an early test for the Byrd Organization. Peery won re-election twice, serving from 1923 to 1929 and also was a delegate to the Democratic National Convention in 1920 and 1924.

In 1929, Peery resigned to become a member of the State Corporation Commission, serving from 1929 to 1933. Then newly elected Senator Byrd approached him to run for governor in 1933. Peery accepted and won the November election.

As governor, Peery created unemployment insurance and, after the repeal of prohibition, he created Virginia's Alcohol Beverage Control board. In 1936, Governor Peery signed into law the act that created the Virginia State Parks. On June 15, 1936, Peery attended the initial opening ceremony for the six new state parks at (then whites-only) Hungry Mother State Park, in Smyth County near the Emory and Henry College campus. He was introduced by former governor E. Lee Trinkle of Wytheville, and remarked that the state park system was something good that came out of the Great Depression, and not only provided CCC jobs for those who lost them in that crisis and needed recreation space for working families, but would continue to help the local economy through tourism.

After his retirement as governor, Peery joined the board of trustees of both Washington and Lee University and Hollins College.

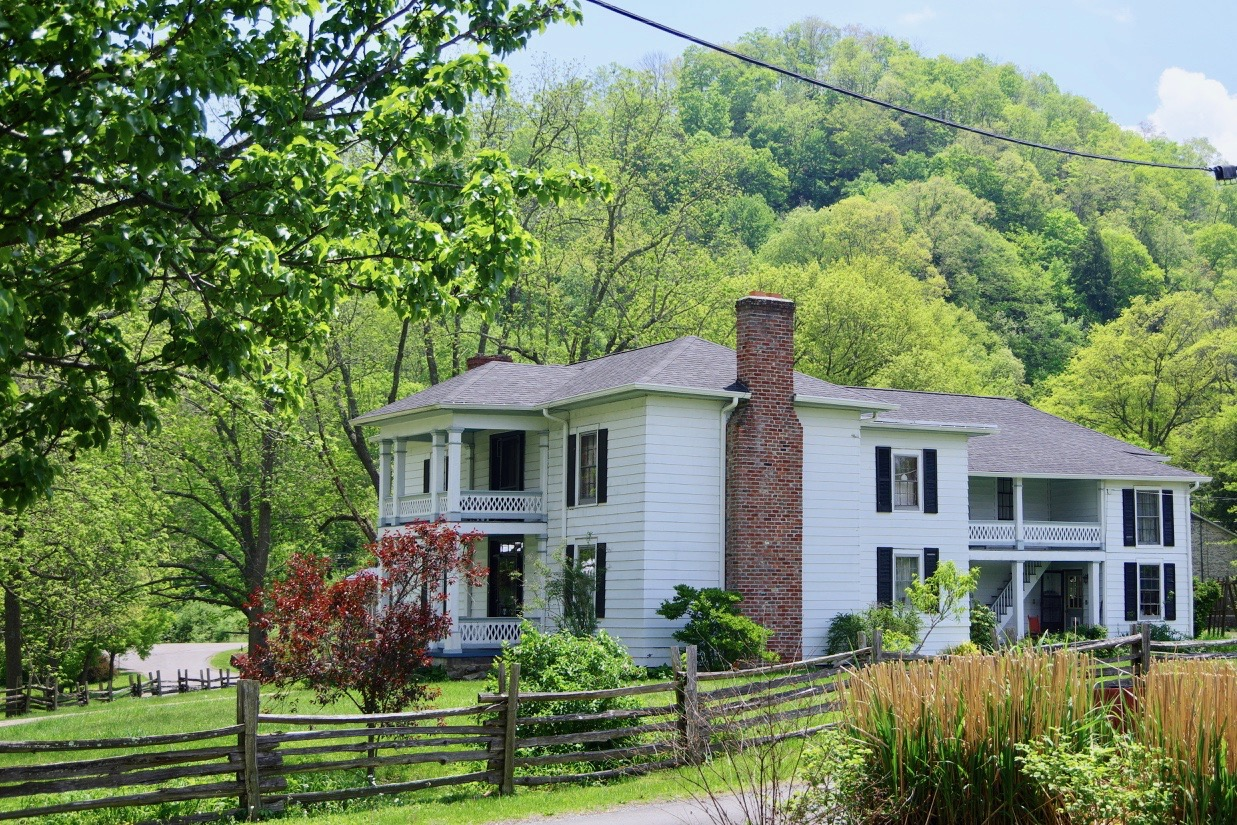
Peery's home in Cedar Bluff, Virginia

== Death and legacy ==
Peery died in 1952, at the age of 78, two weeks short of his 79th birthday, in Richlands, Virginia. He was buried in Maplewood Cemetery in Tazewell, Virginia.

In 2021, Virginia Governor Ralph Northam dedicated Clinch River State Park as the 41st Virginia state park. Although Virginia's first blueway (river-based) park is still in development, with signage and facilities being constructed in part by the Youth Conservation Corps at Sugar Hill near St. Paul in Wise County in 2023, part is in Tazewell County.

== Electoral history ==
1933; Peery was elected Governor of Virginia with 73.74% of the vote, defeating Republican Fred W. McWane, Prohibitionist Andrew J. Dunning, Jr., Socialist George C. White, and Independents John Moffett Robinson and W. A. Rowe.

Date	Election	Candidate	Party	Votes	%
U.S. House of Representatives, Virginia's 9th district
Nov 7, 1922	General	George C. Peery	Democratic	32,163	52.39
Nov 7, 1922	General	John H. Hassinger	Republican	29,227	47.61
Nov 7, 1922	General	C. Bascom Slemp did not seek reelection; seat turned Democratic			
Nov 4, 1924	General	George C. Peery (inc.)	Democratic	31,407	52.57
Nov 4, 1924	General	C. Henry Harman	Republican	28,341	47.43
Nov 2, 1926	General	George C. Peery (inc.)	Democratic	28,305	53.42
Nov 2, 1926	General	S. R. Hurley	Republican	24,684	46.58
Governor of Virginia
Nov 7, 1933	General	George C. Peery	Democratic	122,820	73.74
Nov 7, 1933	General	Fred W. McWane	Republican	40,377	24.24
Nov 7, 1933	General	Andrew J. Dunning, Jr.	Prohibition	1,112	0.67
Nov 7, 1933	General	George C. White	Socialist	1,107	0.66
Nov 7, 1933	General	John Moffett Robinson	Independent	877	0.53
Nov 7, 1933	General	W. A. Rowe	Independent	274	0.16
Nov 7, 1933	General	John G. Pollard unable to seek reelection; seat stayed Democratic			

== Notes ==
U.S. House of Representatives
Preceded by C. Bascom Slemp	Member of the U.S. House of Representatives from Virginia's 9th congressional district 1923–1929	Succeeded by Joseph Shaffer
Political offices
Preceded by Louis S. Epes	Member of the State Corporation Commission; 1929–1933	Succeeded by Thomas W. Ozlin
Preceded by John Pollard	Governor of Virginia; 1934–1938	Succeeded by James Price
Preceded by Paul V. McNutt	Chair of the National Governors Association; 1936–1937	Succeeded by Roy Cochran
Party political offices
Preceded by John Pollard	Democratic nominee for Governor of Virginia; 1933	Succeeded by James Price
