= June 1933 Estonian constitutional referendum =

1933 referendum in Estonia

10–12 June 1933

Results
Choice	Votes	%
Yes	161,595	32.67%
No	333,107	67.33%
Valid votes	494,702	99.31%
Invalid or blank votes	3,438	0.69%
Total votes	498,140	100.00%
Registered voters/turnout	749,461	66.47%

A constitutional referendum was held in Estonia between 10 and 12 June 1933. The new constitution proposed by Parliament was rejected by 67.3% of voters, with a turnout of 66.5%.

== Results ==
Choice	Votes	%
For	161,595	32.7
Against	333,107	67.3
Invalid/blank votes	3,438	–
Total	498,140	100
Registered voters/turnout	749,461	66.5
Source: Nohlen & Stöver
