= 1960 United States Senate elections =

- November 8, 1960
- Class 2

34 (Note: Including both the concurrent special and regular elections in Oregon and as well as Class 3 special election. Does not include the North Dakota special election.) of the 100 seats in the United States Senate 51 seats needed for a majority
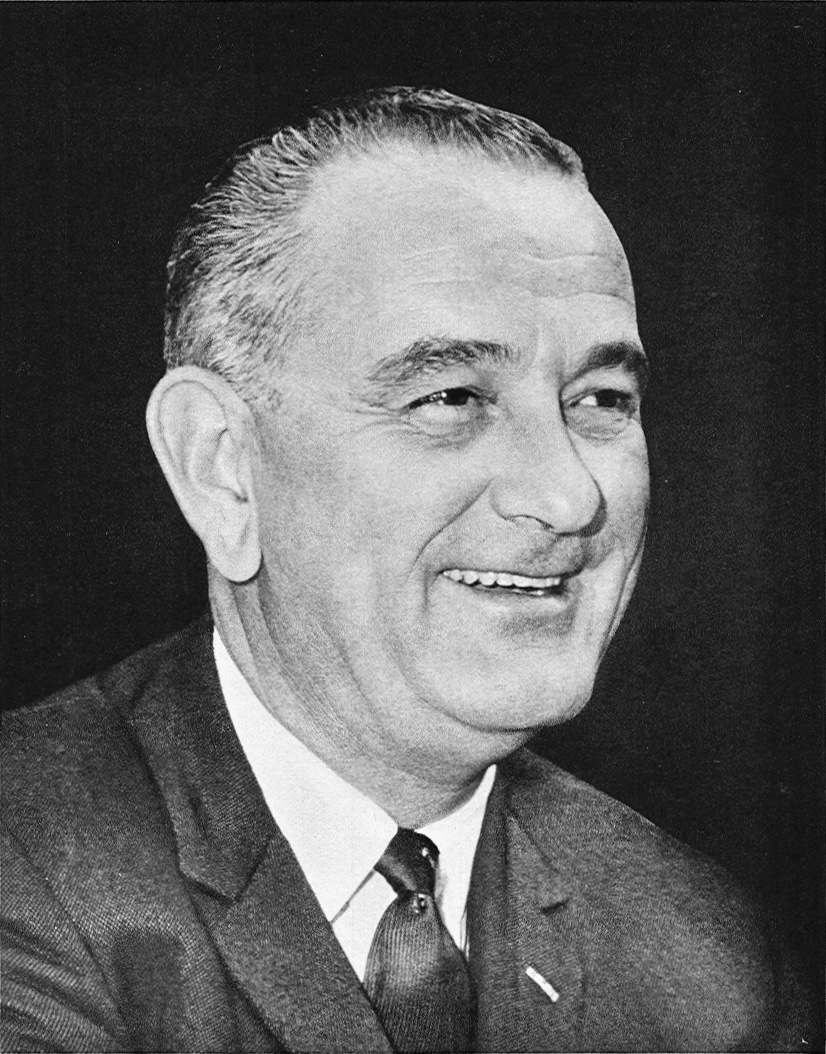

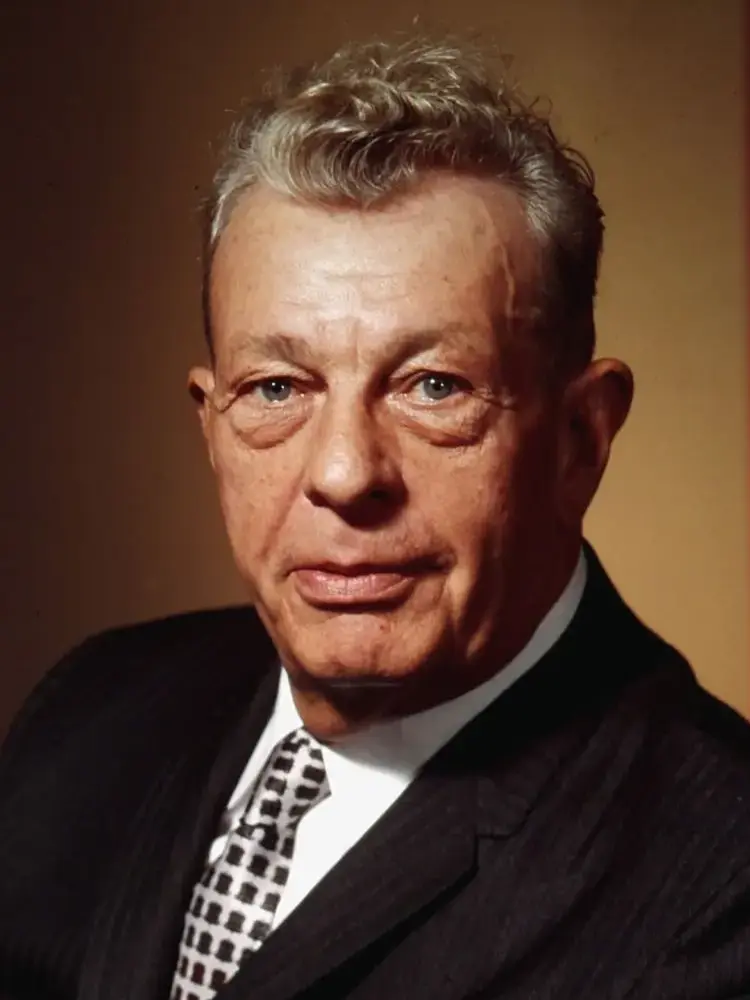
	Majority party	Minority party
Leader	Lyndon Johnson (retired) (Note: Johnson was elected in the Senate election, but did not take office to the next term after John F. Kennedy won the presidential election when Johnson was assuming the vice presidency. Mike Mansfield became the new majority leader at the beginning of the 87th United States Congress on January 3, 1961.)	Everett Dirksen
Party	Democratic	Republican
Leader since	January 3, 1953	January 3, 1959
Leader's seat	Texas	Illinois
Seats before	66	34
Seats after	64	36
Seat change	▼2	▲2
Popular vote	18,547,250	14,894,867
Percentage	55.1%	44.2%
Seats up	23	11
Races won	21	13
- Results of the elections (excl. North Dakota): Republican gain Democratic hold Republican hold No election
Majority Leader before election
Lyndon Johnson
Democratic
Elected Majority Leader
Mike Mansfield
Democratic

The 1960 United States Senate elections coincided with the election of John F. Kennedy as president on November 8, 1960. The 33 seats of Class 2 were contested in regular elections. A special election was also held on June 28, 1960, for a mid-term vacancy in North Dakota where Democrats flipped a seat to expand their majority to 66–34. As Majority Leader Lyndon Johnson was elected Vice President, Mike Mansfield became the new majority leader.

The Republicans gained two seats at the expense of the Democrats. However, Republican Senator-elect Edwin Keith Thomson of Wyoming died December 9, 1960, and was replaced by appointee Democratic John J. Hickey at the beginning of the Congress, reducing Republican gains to one seat. However, this was canceled out by a 1961 special election where Republican John Tower flipped Johnson's Senate seat. The Democrats nonetheless retained a commanding lead in the Senate with 64 seats to 36.

== Results summary ==
↓
64	36
Democratic	Republican

Parties				Total
Parties	Democratic	Republican	Other	Total
Last elections (1958)	64	34	0	98
Before these elections	66	34	0	100
Not up	43	23	0	66
Up	23	11	—	34
Class 2 (1954→1960)	22	11	—	33
Special: Class 3	1	0	—	1
Incumbent retired	4	1	—	5
Held by same party	3	1	—	4
Replaced by other party	▼1 Democrat replaced by ▲1 Republican		—	1
Result	3	2	0	5
Incumbent ran	19	10	—	29
Won re-election	18	10	—	28
Lost re-election	▼1 Democrat replaced by ▲1 Republican		—	1
Lost renomination, but held by same party	0	0	—	0
Result	18	11	0	29
Total elected	21	13	0	34
Net gain/loss	▼2	▲2	Steady	2
Nationwide vote	18,547,250	14,894,867	218,893	33,661,010
Share	55.10%	44.25%	0.65%	100%
Result	64	36	0	100

Source: Clerk of the U.S. House of Representatives (1961). "Statistics of the Presidential and Congressional Election of November 8, 1960" (PDF). U.S. Government Printing Office. p. 52.

== Gains, losses, and holds ==
=== Retirements ===
Two Republicans and four Democrats retired instead of seeking re-election.

State	Senator	Replaced by
Iowa	Thomas E. Martin	Jack Miller
Montana	James E. Murray	Lee Metcalf
North Dakota (special)	Norman Brunsdale	Quentin Burdick
Oregon	Hall S. Lusk	Maurine Neuberger
Rhode Island	Theodore F. Green	Claiborne Pell
Wyoming	Joseph C. O'Mahoney	Keith Thomson

=== Defeats ===
One Democrat sought re-election but lost in the general election.

State	Senator	Replaced by
Delaware	J. Allen Frear Jr.	J. Caleb Boggs

=== Post-election changes ===
Four Republicans died and two Democrats resigned, and were all replaced by appointees. One Republican senator-elect died December 9, 1960, before the next Congress began, and was replaced by a Democratic appointee. In Texas, a 1961 special election was held prior to the 1962 United States Senate elections, where John Tower won the special election to succeed Democratic appointee William A. Blakley, who lost election to finish the term.

State	Senator	Replaced by
Idaho (Class 2)	Henry Dworshak	Len Jordan
Kansas (Class 2)	Andrew Frank Schoeppel	James B. Pearson
Massachusetts (Class 1)	John F. Kennedy	Benjamin A. Smith II
New Hampshire (Class 2)	Styles Bridges	Maurice J. Murphy Jr.
South Dakota (Class 3)	Francis H. Case	Joseph H. Bottum
Texas (Class 2)	Lyndon B. Johnson	William A. Blakley
Wyoming (Class 2)	Keith Thomson	Joe Hickey
Texas (Class 2)	William A. Blakley	John Tower

== Change in composition ==
=== After the June special election ===
D_{1}	D_{2}	D_{3}	D_{4}	D_{5}	D_{6}	D_{7}	D_{8}	D_{9}	D_{10}
D_{20}	D_{19}	D_{18}	D_{17}	D_{16}	D_{15}	D_{14}	D_{13}	D_{12}	D_{11}
D_{21}	D_{22}	D_{23}	D_{24}	D_{25}	D_{26}	D_{27}	D_{28}	D_{29}	D_{30}
D_{40}	D_{39}	D_{38}	D_{37}	D_{36}	D_{35}	D_{34}	D_{33}	D_{32}	D_{31}
D_{41}	D_{42}	D_{43}	D_{44}	D_{45}	D_{46}	D_{47}	D_{48}	D_{49}	D_{50}
Majority →									D_{51}
D_{60}	D_{59}	D_{58}	D_{57}	D_{56}	D_{55}	D_{54}	D_{53}	D_{52}	D_{51}
D_{61}	D_{62}	D_{63}	D_{64}	D_{65}	D_{66} N.D. (sp); Gain	R_{34}	R_{33}	R_{32}	R_{31}
R_{21}	R_{22}	R_{23}	R_{24}	R_{25}	R_{26}	R_{27}	R_{28}	R_{29}	R_{30}
R_{20}	R_{19}	R_{18}	R_{17}	R_{16}	R_{15}	R_{14}	R_{13}	R_{12}	R_{11}
R_{1}	R_{2}	R_{3}	R_{4}	R_{5}	R_{6}	R_{7}	R_{8}	R_{9}	R_{10}

=== Before the November elections ===
D_{1}	D_{2}	D_{3}	D_{4}	D_{5}	D_{6}	D_{7}	D_{8}	D_{9}	D_{10}
D_{20}	D_{19}	D_{18}	D_{17}	D_{16}	D_{15}	D_{14}	D_{13}	D_{12}	D_{11}
D_{21}	D_{22}	D_{23}	D_{24}	D_{25}	D_{26}	D_{27}	D_{28}	D_{29}	D_{30}
D_{40}	D_{39}	D_{38}	D_{37}	D_{36}	D_{35}	D_{34}	D_{33}	D_{32}	D_{31}
D_{41}	D_{42}	D_{43}	D_{44} Ala. Ran	D_{45} Alaska; Ran	D_{46} Ark. Ran	D_{47} Del. Ran	D_{48} Ga. Ran	D_{49} Ill. Ran	D_{50} La. Ran
Majority →									D_{51} Mich. Ran
D_{60} R.I. Retired	D_{59} Ore. (reg); Ore. (sp); Retired	D_{58} Okla. Ran	D_{57} N.C. Ran	D_{56} N.M. Ran	D_{55} Mont. Retired	D_{54} Mo. (sp); Ran	D_{53} Miss. Ran	D_{52} Minn. Ran	D_{51} Mich. Ran
D_{61} S.C. Ran	D_{62} Tenn. Ran	D_{63} Texas; Ran	D_{64} Va. Ran	D_{65} W.Va. Ran	D_{66} Wyo. Retired	R_{34} S.D. Ran	R_{33} N.J. Ran	R_{32} N.H. Ran	R_{31} Neb. Ran
R_{21}	R_{22}	R_{23}	R_{24} Colo. Ran	R_{25} Idaho; Ran	R_{26} Iowa; Retired	R_{27} Kan. Ran	R_{28} Ky. Ran	R_{29} Maine; Ran	R_{30} Mass. Ran
R_{20}	R_{19}	R_{18}	R_{17}	R_{16}	R_{15}	R_{14}	R_{13}	R_{12}	R_{11}
R_{1}	R_{2}	R_{3}	R_{4}	R_{5}	R_{6}	R_{7}	R_{8}	R_{9}	R_{10}

=== Result of the November elections ===
D_{1}	D_{2}	D_{3}	D_{4}	D_{5}	D_{6}	D_{7}	D_{8}	D_{9}	D_{10}
D_{20}	D_{19}	D_{18}	D_{17}	D_{16}	D_{15}	D_{14}	D_{13}	D_{12}	D_{11}
D_{21}	D_{22}	D_{23}	D_{24}	D_{25}	D_{26}	D_{27}	D_{28}	D_{29}	D_{30}
D_{40}	D_{39}	D_{38}	D_{37}	D_{36}	D_{35}	D_{34}	D_{33}	D_{32}	D_{31}
D_{41}	D_{42}	D_{43}	D_{44} Ala. Re-elected	D_{45} Alaska; Re-elected	D_{46} Ark. Re-elected	D_{47} Ga. Re-elected	D_{48} Ill. Re-elected	D_{49} La. Re-elected	D_{50} Mich. Re-elected
Majority →									D_{51} Minn. Re-elected
D_{60} S.C. Re-elected	D_{59} R.I. Hold	D_{58} Ore. (reg); Ore. (sp); Hold	D_{57} Okla. Re-elected	D_{56} N.C. Re-elected	D_{55} N.M. Re-elected	D_{54} Mont. Hold	D_{53} Mo. (sp); Elected (Note: Appointee elected)	D_{52} Miss. Re-elected	D_{51} Minn. Re-elected
D_{61} Tenn. Re-elected	D_{62} Texas; Re-elected	D_{63} Va. Re-elected	D_{64} W.Va. Re-elected	R_{36} Wyo. (Note: Edwin Keith Thomson, the Republican senator-elect as a result of the November election, died on December 9; Democrat John J. Hickey was appointed in his place and seated at the beginning of the Congress.); Gain	R_{35} Del. Gain	R_{34} S.D. Re-elected	R_{33} N.J. Re-elected	R_{32} N.H. Re-elected	R_{31} Neb. Re-elected
R_{21}	R_{22}	R_{23}	R_{24} Colo. Re-elected	R_{25} Idaho; Re-elected	R_{26} Iowa; Hold	R_{27} Kan. Re-elected	R_{28} Ky. Re-elected	R_{29} Maine; Re-elected	R_{30} Mass. Re-elected
R_{20}	R_{19}	R_{18}	R_{17}	R_{16}	R_{15}	R_{14}	R_{13}	R_{12}	R_{11}
R_{1}	R_{2}	R_{3}	R_{4}	R_{5}	R_{6}	R_{7}	R_{8}	R_{9}	R_{10}

=== Beginning of the next Congress ===
D_{1}	D_{2}	D_{3}	D_{4}	D_{5}	D_{6}	D_{7}	D_{8}	D_{9}	D_{10}
D_{20}	D_{19}	D_{18}	D_{17}	D_{16}	D_{15}	D_{14}	D_{13}	D_{12}	D_{11}
D_{21}	D_{22}	D_{23}	D_{24}	D_{25}	D_{26}	D_{27}	D_{28}	D_{29}	D_{30}
D_{40}	D_{39}	D_{38}	D_{37}	D_{36}	D_{35}	D_{34}	D_{33}	D_{32}	D_{31}
D_{41}	D_{42}	D_{43}	D_{44}	D_{45}	D_{46}	D_{47}	D_{48}	D_{49}	D_{50}
Majority →									D_{51}
D_{60}	D_{59}	D_{58}	D_{57}	D_{56}	D_{55}	D_{54}	D_{53}	D_{52}	D_{51}
D_{61}	D_{62}	D_{63}	D_{64} Wyo. Gain	R_{36} Texas; Gain	R_{35}	R_{34}	R_{33}	R_{32}	R_{31}
R_{21}	R_{22}	R_{23}	R_{24}	R_{25}	R_{26}	R_{27}	R_{28}	R_{29}	R_{30}
R_{20}	R_{19}	R_{18}	R_{17}	R_{16}	R_{15}	R_{14}	R_{13}	R_{12}	R_{11}
R_{1}	R_{2}	R_{3}	R_{4}	R_{5}	R_{6}	R_{7}	R_{8}	R_{9}	R_{10}

Key:	D_{#} / Democratic; R_{#} / Republican

== Race summaries ==
=== Special elections during the 86th Congress ===
In these special elections, the winner was seated during 1960 or before January 3, 1961; ordered by election date.

State	Incumbent			Results	Candidates
State	Senator	Party	Electoral history	Results	Candidates
North Dakota (Class 1)	Norman Brunsdale	Republican	1959 (Appointed)	Interim appointee retired. New senator elected June 28, 1960 and seated August 8, 1960. Democratic-NPL gain.	▌ ✓ Quentin Burdick (Democratic-NPL) 49.7%; ▌John E. Davis (Republican) 49.2%
Missouri (Class 3)	Edward V. Long	Democratic	1960 (Appointed)	Interim appointee elected November 8, 1960.	▌ ✓ Edward V. Long (Democratic) 53.2%; ▌Lon Hocker (Republican) 46.8%
Oregon (Class 2)	Hall S. Lusk	Democratic	1960 (Appointed)	Interim appointee retired. New senator elected November 8, 1960 and seated the following day. Winner was also elected to the next term, see below. Democratic hold.	▌ ✓ Maurine Neuberger (Democratic) 55.0%; ▌Elmo Smith (Republican) 45.0%

=== Elections leading to the next Congress ===
In these general elections, the winners were elected for the term beginning January 3, 1961; ordered by state.

All of the elections involved the Class 2 seats.

State	Incumbent			Results	Candidates
State	Senator	Party	Electoral history	Results	Candidates
Alabama	John Sparkman	Democratic	1946 (special); 1948; 1954	Incumbent re-elected.	▌ ✓ John Sparkman (Democratic) 70.2%; ▌Julian Elgin (Republican) 29.8%
Alaska	Bob Bartlett	Democratic	1958 (New seat)	Incumbent re-elected.	▌ ✓ Bob Bartlett (Democratic) 63.4%; ▌Lee McKinley (Republican) 36.6%
Arkansas	John L. McClellan	Democratic	1942; 1948; 1954	Incumbent re-elected.	▌ ✓ John L. McClellan (Democratic); Unopposed
Colorado	Gordon Allott	Republican	1954	Incumbent re-elected.	▌ ✓ Gordon Allott (Republican) 53.5%; ▌Robert Lee Knous (Democratic) 46.0%
Delaware	J. Allen Frear Jr.	Democratic	1948; 1954	Incumbent lost re-election. Republican gain.	▌ ✓ J. Caleb Boggs (Republican) 50.7%; ▌J. Allen Frear Jr. (Democratic) 49.3%
Georgia	Richard Russell Jr.	Democratic	1932 (special); 1936; 1942; 1948; 1954	Incumbent re-elected.	▌ ✓ Richard Russell Jr. (Democratic); Unopposed
Idaho	Henry Dworshak	Republican	1946 (special); 1948 (Lost); 1949 (Appointed); 1950 (special); 1954	Incumbent re-elected.	▌ ✓ Henry Dworshak (Republican) 52.3%; ▌R. F. Bob McLaughlin (Democratic) 47.7%
Illinois	Paul Douglas	Democratic	1948; 1954	Incumbent re-elected.	▌ ✓ Paul Douglas (Democratic) 54.6%; ▌Samuel W. Witwer (Republican) 45.2%
Iowa	Thomas E. Martin	Republican	1954	Incumbent retired. Republican hold.	▌ ✓ Jack Miller (Republican) 51.9%; ▌Herschel C. Loveless (Democratic) 48.1%
Kansas	Andrew Frank Schoeppel	Republican	1948; 1954	Incumbent re-elected.	▌ ✓ Andrew Frank Schoeppel (Republican) 54.6%; ▌Frank Gordon Theis (Democratic) 43.8%
Kentucky	John Sherman Cooper	Republican	1946 (special); 1948 (Lost); 1952 (special); 1954 (Lost); 1956 (special)	Incumbent re-elected.	▌ ✓ John Sherman Cooper (Republican) 59.2%; ▌Keen Johnson (Democratic) 40.8%
Louisiana	Allen J. Ellender	Democratic	1936; 1942; 1948; 1954	Incumbent re-elected.	▌ ✓ Allen J. Ellender (Democratic) 79.8%; ▌George W. Reese Jr. (Republican) 20.2%
Maine	Margaret Chase Smith	Republican	1948; 1954	Incumbent re-elected.	▌ ✓ Margaret Chase Smith (Republican) 61.7%; ▌Lucia M. Cormier (Democratic) 38.4%
Massachusetts	Leverett Saltonstall	Republican	1944 (special); 1948; 1954	Incumbent re-elected.	▌ ✓ Leverett Saltonstall (Republican) 56.2%; ▌Thomas J. O'Connor (Democratic) 43.5%
Michigan	Patrick V. McNamara	Democratic	1954	Incumbent re-elected.	▌ ✓ Patrick V. McNamara (Democratic) 51.7%; ▌Alvin Morell Bentley (Republican) 48.0%
Minnesota	Hubert Humphrey	DFL (Note: The Minnesota Democratic–Farmer–Labor Party is affiliated nationally with the Democratic Party (United States).)	1948; 1954	Incumbent re-elected.	▌ ✓ Hubert Humphrey (DFL) 57.5%; ▌P. Kenneth Peterson (Republican) 42.2%
Mississippi	James Eastland	Democratic	1942; 1948; 1954	Incumbent re-elected.	▌ ✓ James Eastland (Democratic) 91.8%; ▌Joe A. Moore (Republican) 8.2%
Montana	James E. Murray	Democratic	1934 (special); 1936; 1942; 1948; 1954	Incumbent retired. Democratic hold.	▌ ✓ Lee Metcalf (Democratic) 50.7%; ▌Orvin B. Fjare (Republican) 49.3%
Nebraska	Carl Curtis	Republican	1954	Incumbent re-elected.	▌ ✓ Carl Curtis (Republican) 58.9%; ▌Robert B. Conrad (Democratic) 41.1%
New Hampshire	Styles Bridges	Republican	1936; 1942; 1948; 1954	Incumbent re-elected.	▌ ✓ Styles Bridges (Republican) 60.4%; ▌Herbert W. Hill (Democratic) 39.7%
New Jersey	Clifford P. Case	Republican	1954	Incumbent re-elected.	▌ ✓ Clifford P. Case (Republican) 55.7%; ▌Thorn Lord (Democratic) 43.2%
New Mexico	Clinton Anderson	Democratic	1948; 1954	Incumbent re-elected.	▌ ✓ Clinton Anderson (Democratic) 63.4%; ▌William Colwes (Republican) 36.6%
North Carolina	B. Everett Jordan	Democratic	1958 (Appointed); 1958 (special)	Incumbent re-elected.	▌ ✓ B. Everett Jordan (Democratic) 61.4%; ▌Kyle Hayes (Republican) 38.6%
Oklahoma	Robert S. Kerr	Democratic	1948; 1954	Incumbent re-elected.	▌ ✓ Robert S. Kerr (Democratic) 54.8%; ▌B. Hayden Crawford (Republican) 44.6%
Oregon	Hall S. Lusk	Democratic	1960 (Appointed)	Interim appointee retired. Winner also elected to finish the term; see above. Democratic hold.	▌ ✓ Maurine Neuberger (Democratic) 54.6%; ▌Elmo Smith (Republican) 45.4%
Rhode Island	Theodore F. Green	Democratic	1936; 1942; 1948; 1954	Incumbent retired. Democratic hold.	▌ ✓ Claiborne Pell (Democratic) 68.9%; ▌Raoul Archambault (Republican) 31.1%
South Carolina	Strom Thurmond	Democratic	1954 (write-in); 1954 (Appointed); 1956 (Resigned); 1956 (special)	Incumbent re-elected.	▌ ✓ Strom Thurmond (Democratic); Unopposed
South Dakota	Karl Mundt	Republican	1948; 1948 (Appointed); 1954	Incumbent re-elected.	▌ ✓ Karl Mundt (Republican) 52.4%; ▌George McGovern (Democratic) 47.6%
Tennessee	Estes Kefauver	Democratic	1948; 1954	Incumbent re-elected.	▌ ✓ Estes Kefauver (Democratic) 71.8%; ▌A. Bradley Frazier (Republican) 28.3%
Texas	Lyndon B. Johnson	Democratic	1948; 1954	Incumbent re-elected, but resigned at the end of the term to become U.S. Vice President. William A. Blakley was appointed to begin the next term.	▌ ✓ Lyndon B. Johnson (Democratic) 58.0%; ▌John Tower (Republican) 41.1%; ▌Bard A. Logan (Constitution) 0.9%
Virginia	A. Willis Robertson	Democratic	1946 (special); 1948; 1954	Incumbent re-elected.	▌ ✓ A. Willis Robertson (Democratic) 81.3%; ▌Stuart D. Baker (Independent) 14.2%
West Virginia	Jennings Randolph	Democratic	1958 (special)	Incumbent re-elected.	▌ ✓ Jennings Randolph (Democratic) 55.3%; ▌Cecil H. Underwood (Republican) 44.7%
Wyoming	Joseph C. O'Mahoney	Democratic	1954	Incumbent retired. New senator elected, but died before Congress began. Republican gain. Joe Hickey (D) was appointed to begin the next term.	▌ ✓ Keith Thomson (Republican) 56.4%; ▌Raymond B. Whitaker (Democratic) 43.6%

== Closest races ==
Eleven races had a margin of victory under 10%:

State	Party of winner	Margin
North Dakota (special)	Democratic (flip)	0.5%
Montana	Democratic	1.4%
Delaware	Republican (flip)	1.4%
Michigan	Democratic	3.7%
Iowa	Republican	3.8%
Idaho	Republican	4.6%
South Dakota	Republican	4.8%
Missouri (special)	Democratic	6.4%
Colorado	Republican	7.5%
Oregon	Democratic	9.2%
Illinois	Democratic	9.4%

Rhode Island was the tipping point state with a margin of 37.8%.

== Alabama ==
1960 United States Senate election in Alabama
- November 8, 1960
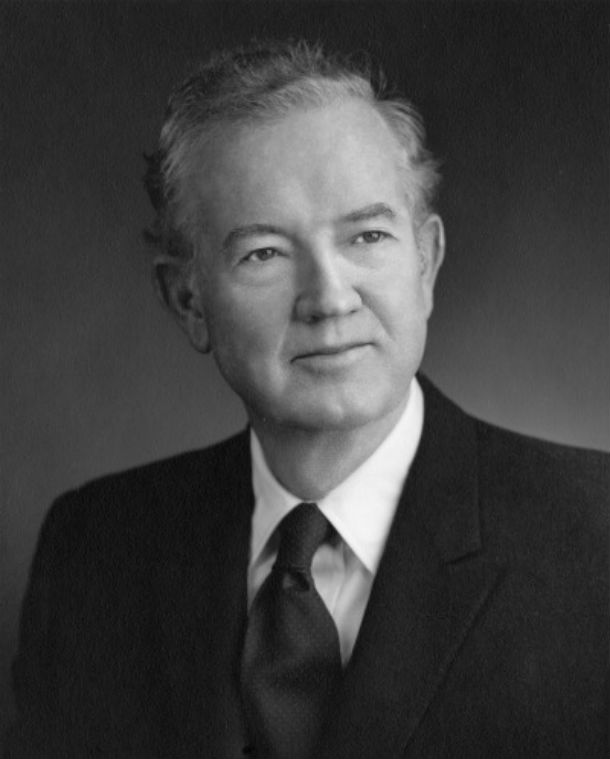

Nominee	John Sparkman	Julian Elgin
Party	Democratic	Republican
Popular vote	389,196	164,868
Percentage	70.24%	29.76%
- County results Sparkman: 50–60% 60–70% 70–80% 80–90% Elgin: 50-60% 60-70%
U.S. senator before election
John Sparkman
Democratic
Elected U.S. Senator
John Sparkman
Democratic

Incumbent John J. Sparkman won re-election, having served since 1946. He faced nominal opposition from Republican Julian E. Elgin in the then-deeply Democratic state of Alabama. Sparkman served from 1946 to 1979 in the Senate before retiring and being succeeded by Howell Heflin.

General election
Party	Candidate	Votes	%
Democratic	John J. Sparkman (Incumbent)	389,196	70.24
Republican	Julian E. Elgin	164,868	29.76
Majority		224,328	40.48
Turnout		554,064	
Democratic hold			

== Alaska ==
1960 United States Senate election in Alaska
- November 8, 1960
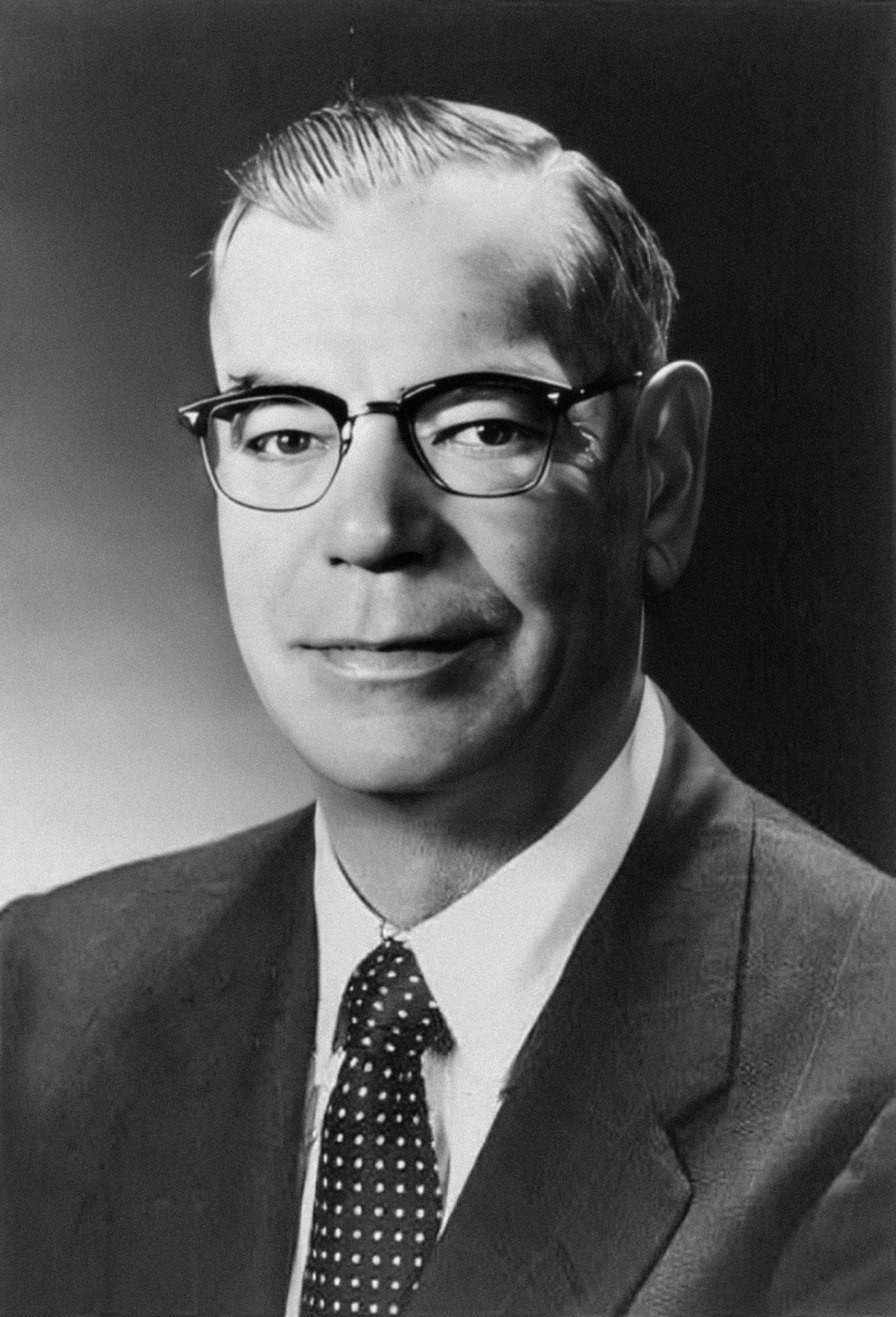

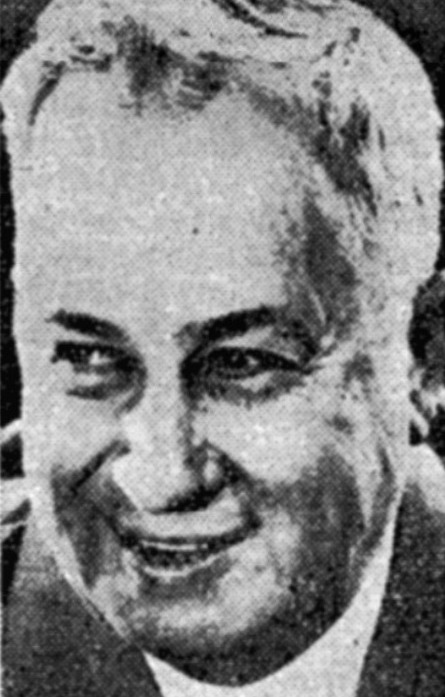
Nominee	Bob Bartlett	Lee McKinley
Party	Democratic	Republican
Popular vote	38,041	21,937
Percentage	63.43%	36.58%
- Results by election district Bartlett: 50–60% 60–70% 70–80% 80–90% McKinley: 50–60%
U.S. senator before election
Bob Bartlett
Democratic
Elected U.S. Senator
Bob Bartlett
Democratic

Incumbent Democrat Bob Bartlett was easily re-elected to his second (his first full) term in the U.S. Senate over Republican dentist Lee McKinley after originally being elected in 1958 upon Alaska's anticipated admission as a state into the United States. Bartlett had previously served as the last delegate from Alaska to Congress.

General election
Party	Candidate	Votes	%
Democratic	Bob Bartlett (Incumbent)	38,041	63.42
Republican	Lee L. McKinley	21,937	36.58
Majority		16,104	26.84
Turnout		59,978	
Democratic hold			

== Arkansas ==
1960 United States Senate election in Arkansas
- November 8, 1960
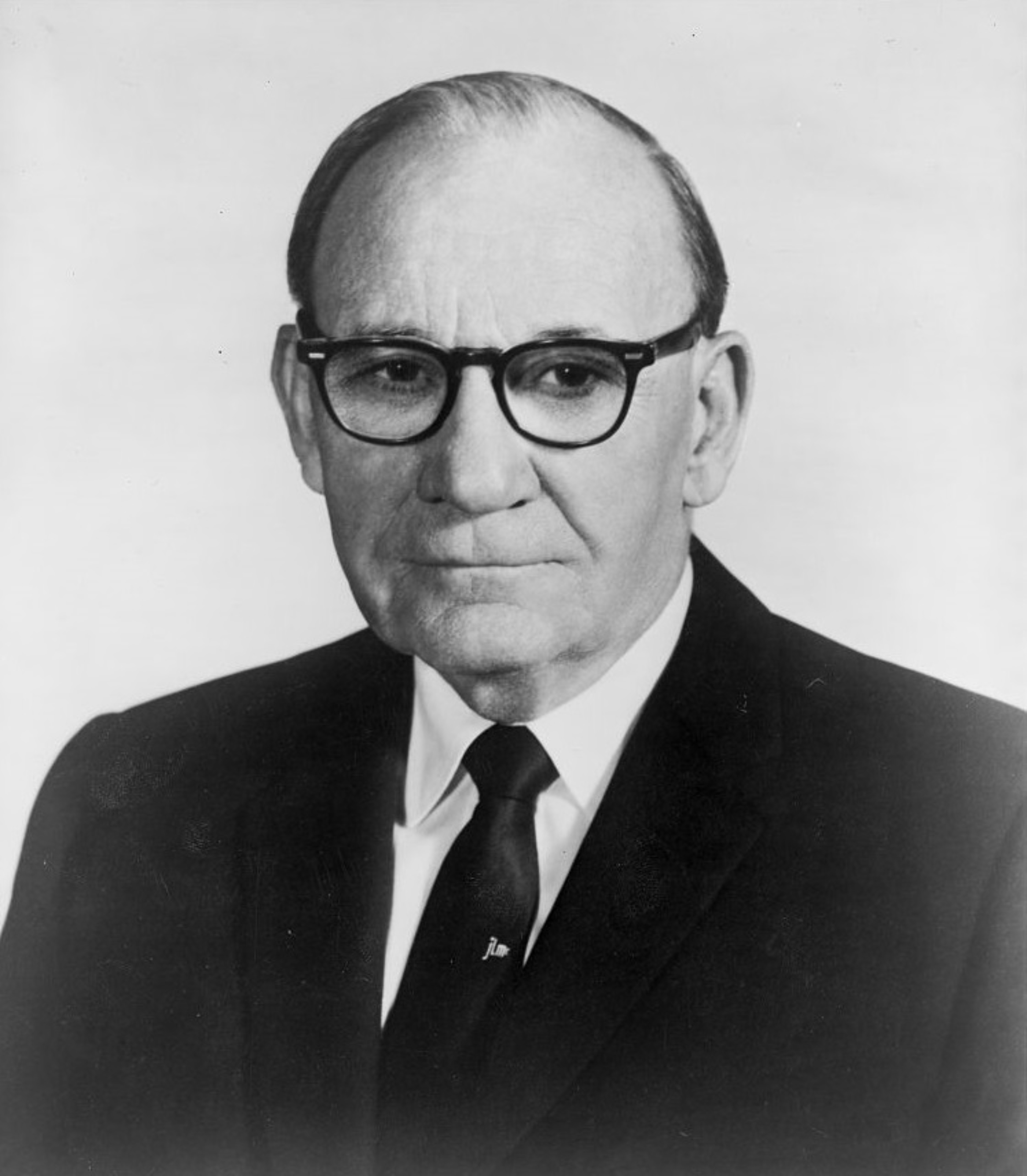
Nominee	John L. McClellan
Party	Democratic
Popular vote	337,036
Percentage	99.88%
- County results McClellan: 90–100%
U.S. senator before election
John L. McClellan
Democratic
Elected U.S. Senator
John L. McClellan
Democratic

Incumbent senator John L. McClellan was re-elected to a fourth term with nominal opposition from write-in independent candidate Marvin Fuchs, who received just 449 of 377,485 votes.

1960 Democratic U.S. Senate primary
Party	Candidate	Votes	%
Democratic	John L. McClellan (incumbent)		unopposed

General election
Party	Candidate	Votes	%
Democratic	John Little McClellan (Incumbent)	377,036	99.88
None	Marvin Fuchs (write-in)	449	0.12
Majority		376,587	99.76
Turnout		377,485	
Democratic hold			

== Colorado ==
1960 United States Senate election in Colorado
- November 8, 1960
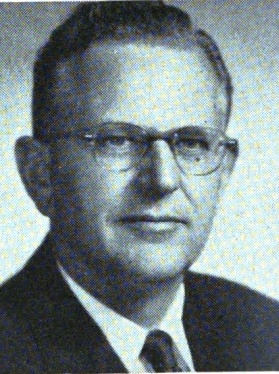

Nominee	Gordon Allott	Robert Lee Knous
Party	Republican	Democratic
Popular vote	389,428	334,854
Percentage	53.52%	46.02%
- County results Allott: 40-50% 50–60% 60–70% Knous: 50–60% 60–70%
U.S. senator before election
Gordon Allott
Republican
Elected U.S. Senator
Gordon Allott
Republican

Incumbent Gordon Allott was re-elected to a second term in office, defeating lieutenant governor Robert Knous by just under eight percentage points. He would wind up winning re-election in 1966 before retiring in 1973, replaced by Democrat Floyd Haskell.

General election
Party	Candidate	Votes	%
Republican	Gordon L. Allott (Incumbent)	389,428	53.75
Democratic	Robert L. Knous	331,752	45.79
Independent	William R. Casey	3,351	0.46
Majority		57,676	7.96
Turnout		724,531	
Republican hold			

== Delaware ==
1960 United States Senate election in Delaware
- November 8, 1960
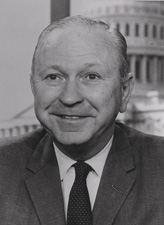

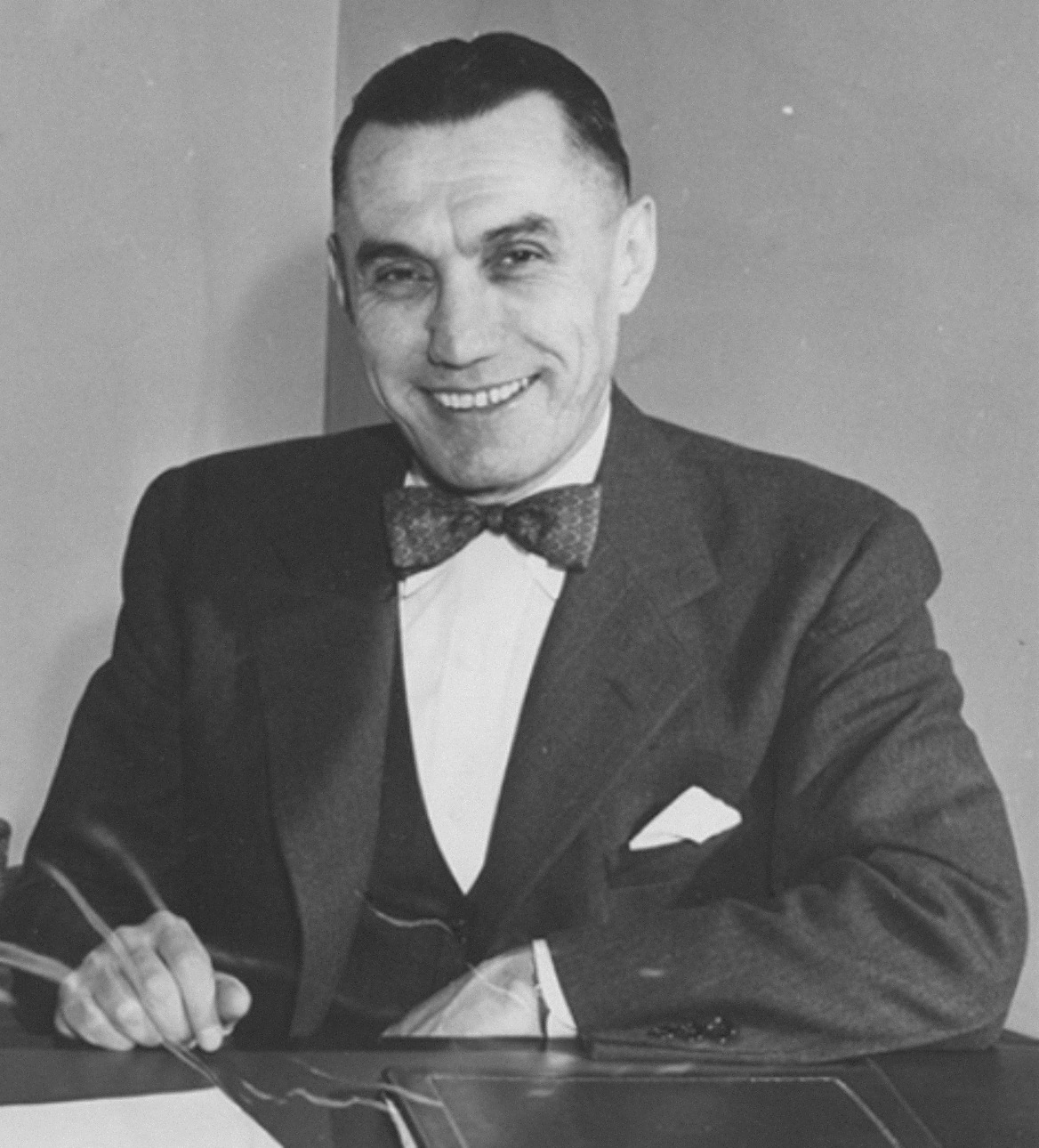
Nominee	J. Caleb Boggs	J. Allen Frear Jr.
Party	Republican	Democratic
Popular vote	98,874	96,090
Percentage	50.71%	49.29%
- County Results; Boggs: 50-60% Frear: 50–60%
U.S. senator before election
J. Allen Frear Jr.
Democratic
Elected U.S. senator
J. Caleb Boggs
Republican

J. Allen Frear ran for re-election to a third term, but he was defeated by Republican governor J. Caleb Boggs by a narrow 1% margin. Boggs would be re-elected in 1966, but he would lose re-election to a third term in 1972 to future U.S. President Joe Biden.

General election
Party	Candidate	Votes	%
Republican	J. Caleb Boggs	98,874	50.71
Democratic	J. Allen Frear (Incumbent)	96,090	49.29
Majority		2,784	1.42
Turnout		194,964	
Republican gain from Democratic			

== Georgia ==
1960 U.S. Senate Democratic primary in Georgia
- September 14, 1960
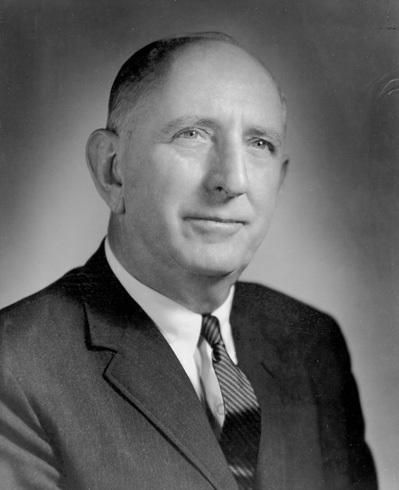
Nominee	Richard Russell Jr.
Party	Democratic
Electoral vote	410
Popular vote	560,256
Percentage	100.00%
- County results Russell: >90%
U.S. senator before election
Richard Russell Jr.
Democratic
Elected U.S. Senator
Richard Russell Jr.
Democratic

Incumbent Richard B. Russell Jr. was re-elected to a sixth term in office, running unopposed in the tantamount Democratic primary and facing nominal opposition in the deeply-Democratic Georgia.

General election
Party	Candidate	Votes	%
Democratic	Richard B. Russell Jr. (Incumbent)	576,140	99.94
None	Scattering	355	0.06
Majority		575,785	98.98
Turnout		576,495	
Democratic hold			

== Idaho ==
Henry Dworshak ran for re-election to a third term, defeating R.F. McLaughlin by just under five percentage points.

Idaho election
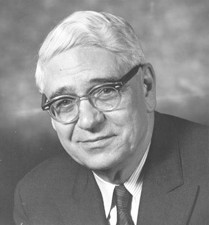
Nominee	Henry Dworshak	R.F. McLaughlin
Party	Republican	Democratic
Popular vote	152,648	139,448
Percentage	52.26%	47.74%
- County results Dworshak: 50-60% 60-70% McLaughlin: 50–60% 60–70%
U.S. senator before election
Henry Dworshak
Republican
Elected U.S. senator
Henry Dworshak
Republican

General election
Party	Candidate	Votes	%
Republican	Henry Dworshak (Incumbent)	152,648	52.26
Democratic	R. F. ‘Bob’ McLaughlin	139,448	47.74
Majority		13,200	4.52
Turnout		292,096	
Republican hold			

== Illinois ==
1960 United States Senate election in Illinois
- November 8, 1960
- Turnout: 84.24%
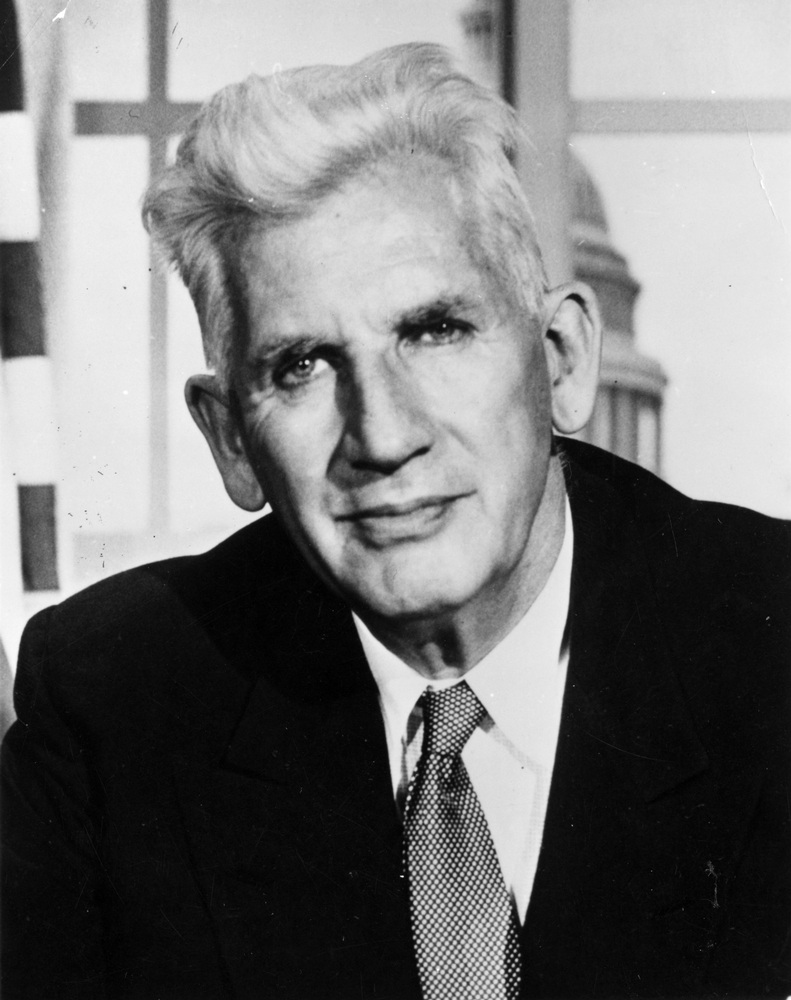

Nominee	Paul Douglas	Samuel W. Witwer
Party	Democratic	Republican
Popular vote	2,530,945	2,093,846
Percentage	54.63%	45.20%
- County results Douglas: 50–60% 60–70% Witwer: 50–60% 60–70%
U.S. senator before election
Paul Douglas
Democratic
Elected U.S. Senator
Paul Douglas
Democratic

Incumbent Paul H. Douglas successfully ran for re-election to a third term, defeating Republican Samuel Witwer.

General election
Party	Candidate	Votes	%
Democratic	Paul H. Douglas (Incumbent)	2,530,943	54.63
Republican	Samuel W. Witwer	2,093,846	45.20
Socialist Labor	Louis Fisher	8,007	0.17
Majority		437,097	9.43
Turnout		4,632,796	84.24
Democratic hold			

== Iowa ==
1960 United States Senate election in Iowa
- November 8, 1960
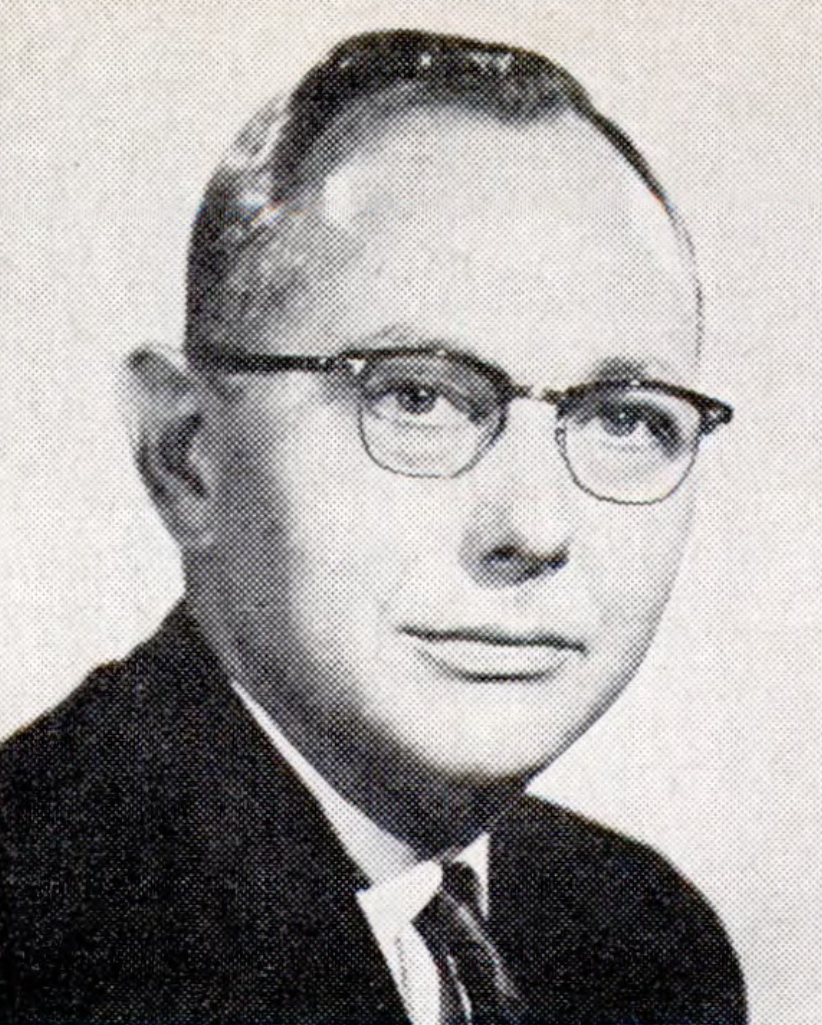

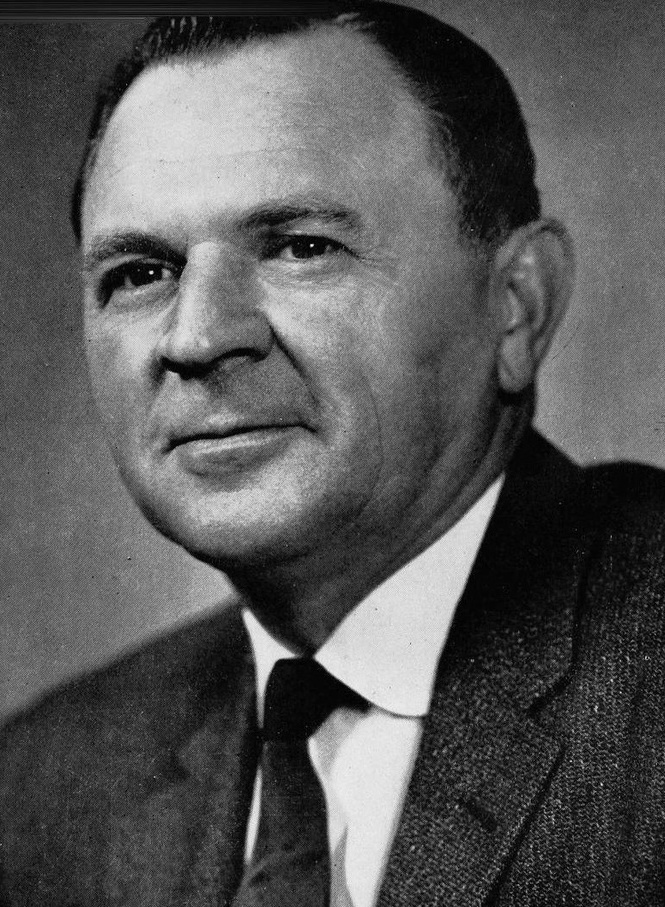
Nominee	Jack Miller	Herschel Loveless
Party	Republican	Democratic
Popular vote	642,643	595,119
Percentage	51.92%	48.08%
- County results Miller: 50-60% 60-70% 70-80% Loveless: 50-60% 60-70%
U.S. senator before election
Thomas E. Martin
Republican
Elected U.S. Senator
Jack Miller
Republican

Incumbent Republican Thomas Martin decided to retire, leaving this seat open. Republican Jack Miller won the open seat, defeating Democrat Herschel C. Loveless and riding the coattails of Richard Nixon's victory in the state.

General election
Party	Candidate	Votes	%
Republican	Jack Miller	642,463	51.91
Democratic	Herschel C. Loveless	595,119	48.09
Majority		47,344	23.11
Turnout		1,237,582	
Republican hold			

== Kansas ==
1960 United States Senate election in Kansas
- November 8, 1960
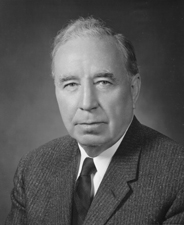

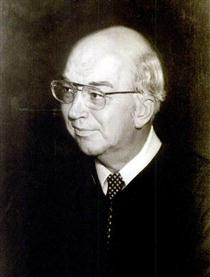
Nominee	Andrew F. Schoeppel	Frank Theis
Party	Republican	Democratic
Popular vote	485,499	388,895
Percentage	54.64%	43.77%
- County results Schoeppel: 40–50% 50–60% 60–70% 70–80% Theis: 50–60% 60–70%
U.S. senator before election
Andrew F. Schoeppel
Republican
Elected U.S. Senator
Andrew F. Schoeppel
Republican

General election
Party	Candidate	Votes	%
Republican	Andrew F. Schoeppel (Incumbent)	485,499	54.64
Democratic	Frank Theis	388,895	43.77
Prohibition	C. E. Cowen	14,198	1.60
Majority		96,604	10.87
Turnout		888,592	
Republican hold			

== Kentucky ==
Kentucky election
- November 8, 1960
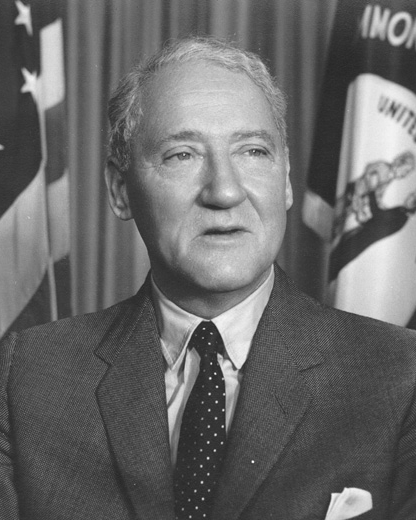

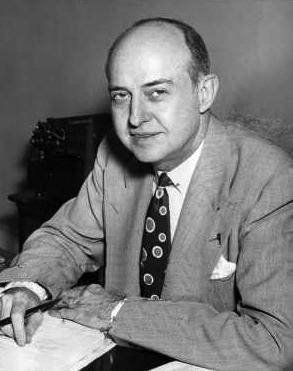
Nominee	John Sherman Cooper	Keen Johnson
Party	Republican	Democratic
Popular vote	644,087	444,830
Percentage	59.15%	40.85%
- County results Cooper: 50-60% 60-70% 70-80% 80–90% >90% Johnson: 50–60% 60–70%
U.S. senator before election
John Sherman Cooper
Republican
Elected U.S. Senator
John Sherman Cooper
Republican

Incumbent John Sherman Cooper ran for re-election, defeating Keen Johnson by nearly 20%. This was the first time Cooper had won an election to a full Senate term, though he had previously served two partial terms.

General election
Party	Candidate	Votes	%
Republican	John Sherman Cooper (Incumbent)	644,087	59.15
Democratic	Keen Johnson	444,830	40.85
Majority		199,257	18.30
Turnout		1,088,917	
Republican hold			

== Louisiana ==
1960 United States Senate election in Louisiana
- November 8, 1960
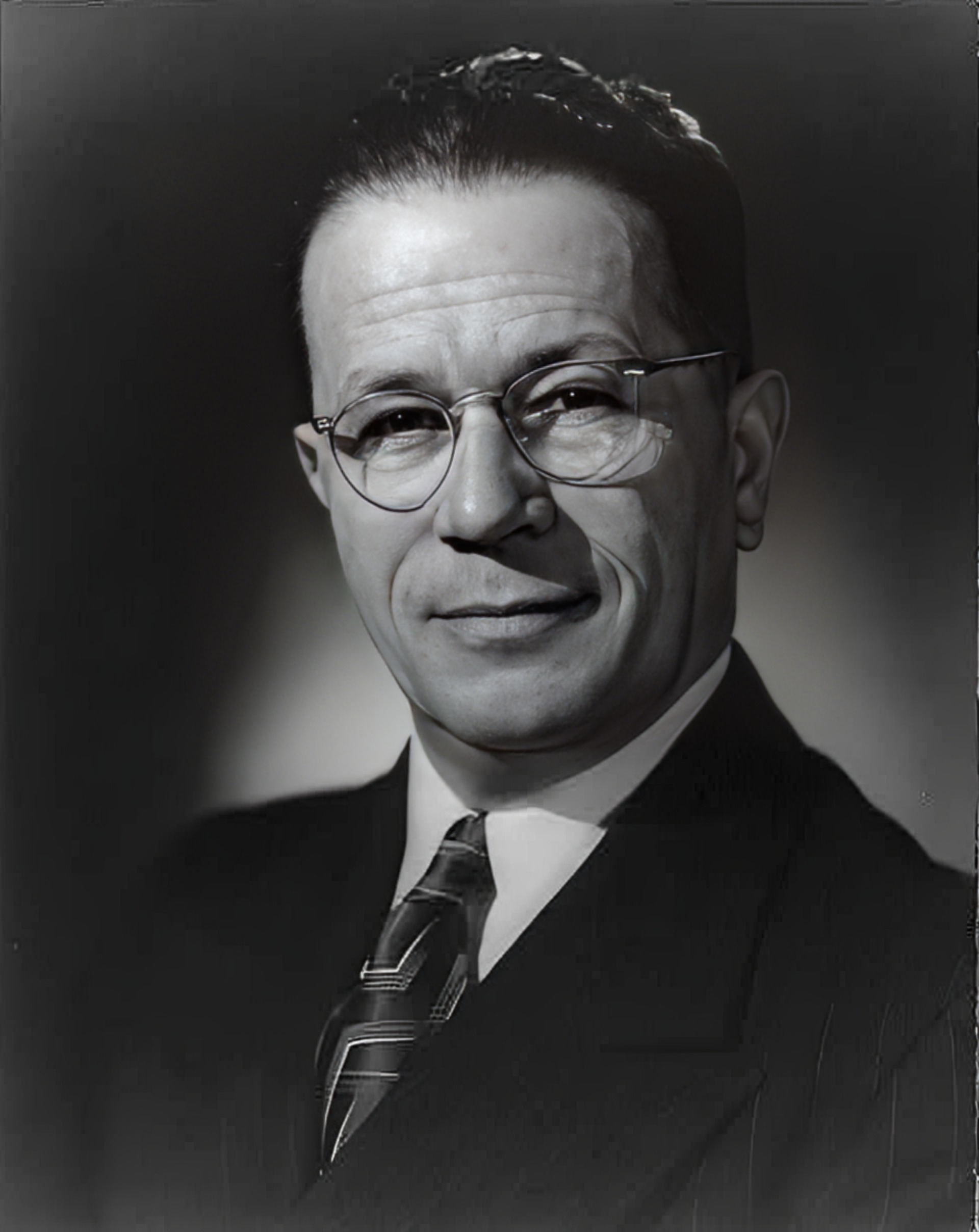

Nominee	Allen J. Ellender	George W. Reese Jr.
Party	Democratic	Republican
Popular vote	432,228	109,698
Percentage	79.76%	20.24%
- Parish results Ellender: 60–70% 70–80% 80–90% >90%
U.S. senator before election
Allen J. Ellender
Democratic
Elected U.S. Senator
Allen J. Ellender
Democratic

General election
Party	Candidate	Votes	%
Democratic	Allen J. Ellender (Incumbent)	432,228	79.76
Republican	George W. Reese Jr.	109,698	20.24
None	Write-Ins	2	0.00
Majority		322,530	59.52
Turnout		541,928	
Democratic hold			

== Maine ==
1960 United States Senate election in Maine
- November 8, 1960
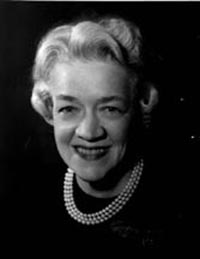

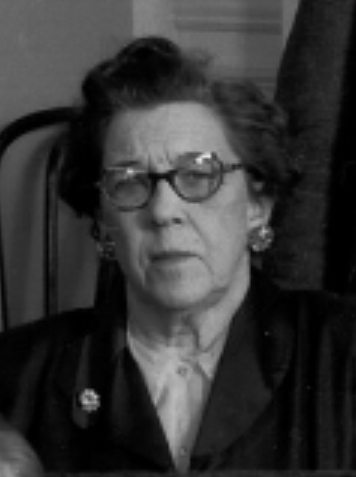
Nominee	Margaret Chase Smith	Lucia Cormier
Party	Republican	Democratic
Popular vote	256,890	159,809
Percentage	61.65%	38.35%
- County results Smith: 50–60% 60–70% 70–80% 80–90% Cormier: 50–60%
U.S. senator before election
Margaret Chase Smith
Republican
Elected U.S. Senator
Margaret Chase Smith
Republican

Incumbent Republican Margaret Chase Smith, the first woman to serve in both houses of Congress, was overwhelmingly re-elected to a third term, defeating Lucia Cormier. This was the first election in which a woman was nominated by both major parties for the office of U.S. Senate, meaning a woman was going to be elected regardless of who won.

General election
Party	Candidate	Votes	%
Republican	Margaret Chase Smith (Incumbent)	256,890	61.65
Democratic	Lucia M. Cormier	159,809	38.35
Majority		97,081	23.30
Turnout		416,699	
Republican hold			

== Massachusetts ==
1960 United States Senate election in Massachusetts
- November 8, 1960
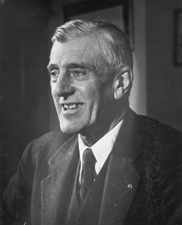

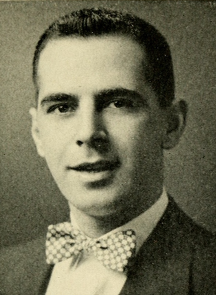
Nominee	Leverett Saltonstall	Thomas J. O'Connor
Party	Republican	Democratic
Popular vote	1,358,556	1,050,725
Percentage	56.19%	43.46%

Saltonstall
40–50%
50–60%
60–70%
70–80%
80–90%
90–100%
O'Connor
40–50%
50–60%
60–70%
Senator before election
Leverett Saltonstall
Republican
Elected Senator
Leverett Saltonstall
Republican

Republican incumbent Leverett Saltonstall was re-elected to another term after being elected in 1944 in a special election. He defeated Democrat Thomas O'Connor Jr.

General election
Party	Candidate	Votes	%
Republican	Leverett Saltonstall (Incumbent)	1,358,556	56.19
Democratic	Thomas J. O'Connor, Jr.	1,050,725	43.46
Socialist Labor	Lawrence Gilfedder	5,735	0.24
Prohibition	Mark R. Shaw	2,794	0.12
None	Others	3	0.00
Majority		307,831	12.73
Turnout		2,417,813	
Republican hold			

== Michigan ==
Michigan election
- November 8, 1960
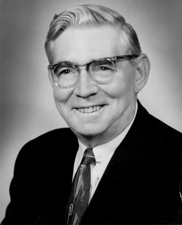

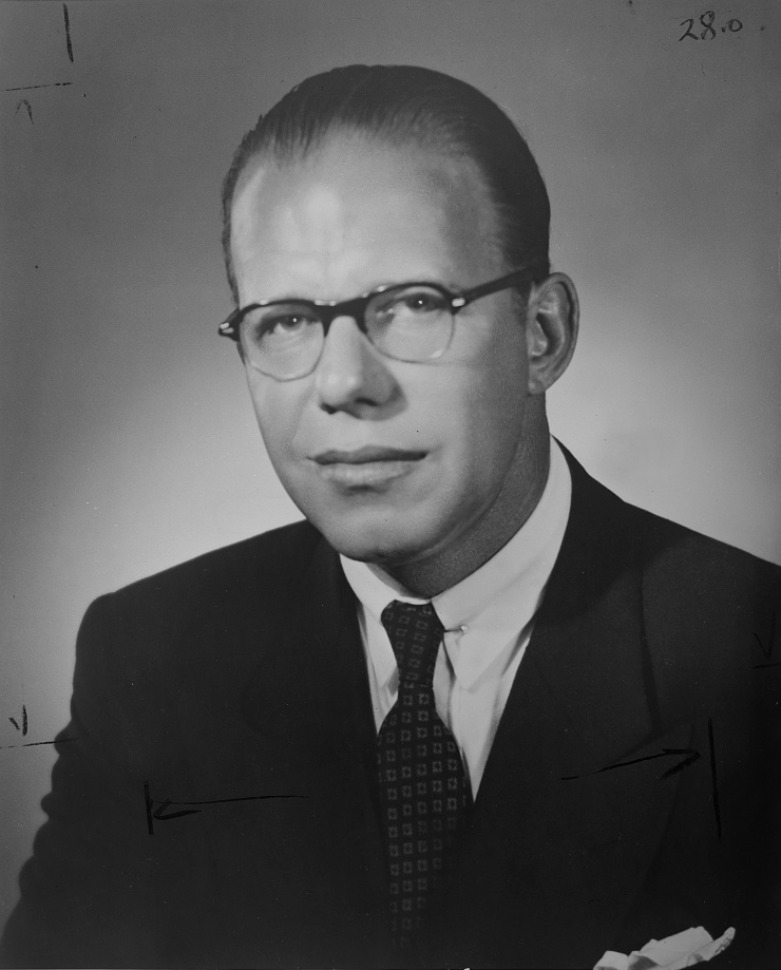
Nominee	Patrick V. McNamara	Alvin M. Bentley
Party	Democratic	Republican
Popular vote	1,669,179	1,548,873
Percentage	51.73%	48.00%
- County results McNamara: 50–60% 60–70% Bentley: 50–60% 60–70% 70–80%
U.S. senator before election
Patrick V. McNamara
Democratic
Elected U.S. Senator
Patrick V. McNamara
Democratic

Democrat Patrick V. McNamara was narrowly re-elected against Republican Alvin Bentley, having served one full term prior.

General election
Party	Candidate	Votes	%
Democratic	Patrick V. McNamara (Incumbent)	1,669,179	51.73
Republican	Alvin Bentley	1,548,873	48.00
Socialist Workers	Frank Lovell	3,282	0.10
Prohibition	Rollin M. Severance	2,273	0.07
Socialist Labor	James Sim	1,565	0.05
Independent American	Alvin L. Reynolds	1,465	0.05
None	Scattering	10	0.00
Majority		120,306	3.73
Turnout		3,226,647	
Democratic hold			

== Minnesota ==
Minnesota election
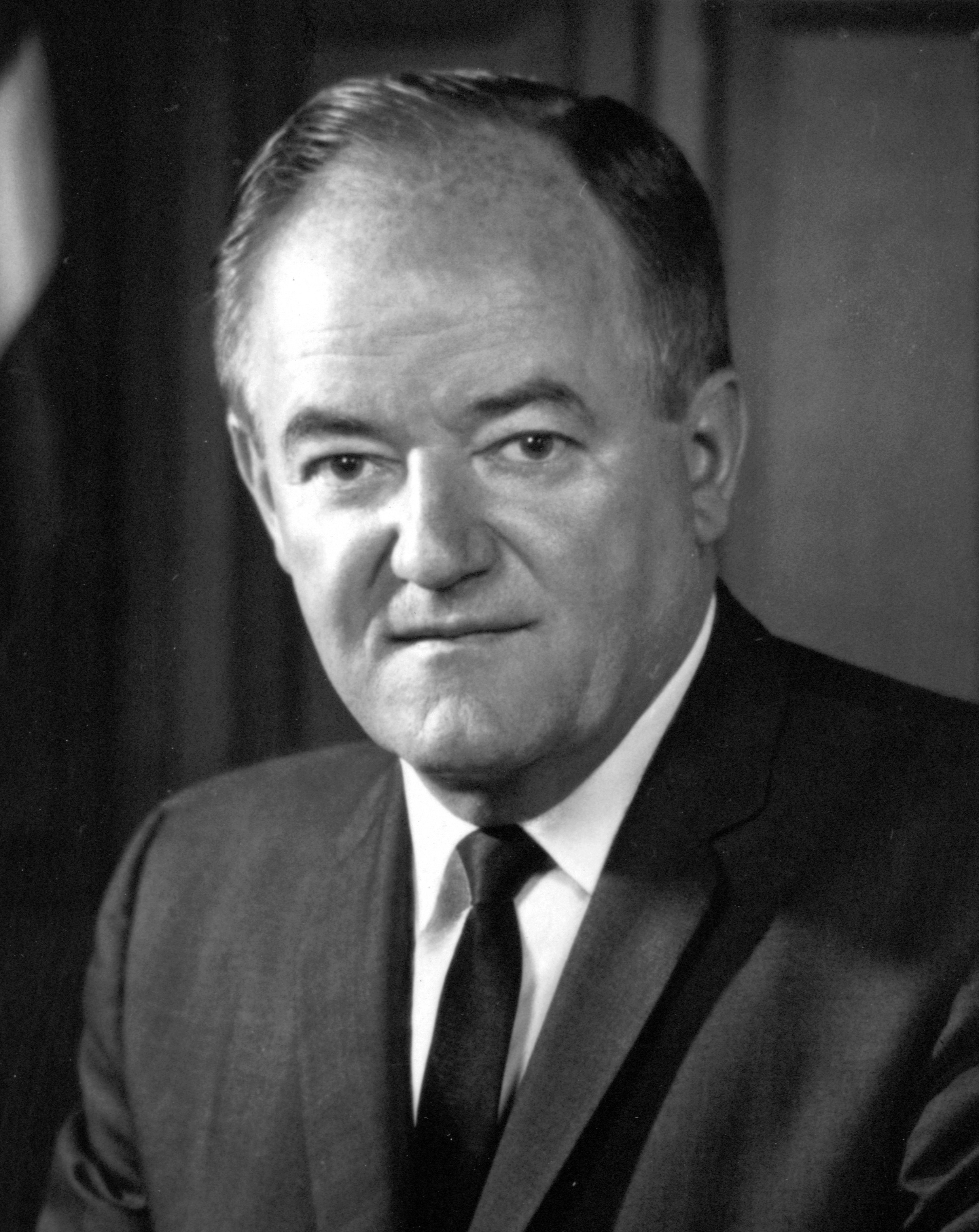

Nominee	Hubert H. Humphrey	P. Kenneth Peterson
Party	Democratic (DFL)	Republican
Popular vote	884,168	648,586
Percentage	57.53%	42.20%
- County results Humphrey: 50–60% 60–70% 70–80% Peterson: 50-60% 60-70%
U.S. senator before election
Hubert H. Humphrey
Democratic (DFL)
Elected U.S. senator
Hubert H. Humphrey
Democratic (DFL)

Democrat Hubert Humphrey, who would later become vice president, was re-elected over Republican challenger P. Kenneth Peterson. He had served since 1949.

General election
Party	Candidate	Votes	%
Democratic (DFL)	Hubert Humphrey (Incumbent)	884,168	57.53
Republican	P. Kenneth Peterson	648,586	42.20
Write-in	Write-Ins	4,085	0.27
Majority		117,791	15.33
Turnout		1,532,754	
Democratic (DFL) hold			

== Mississippi ==
Mississippi election
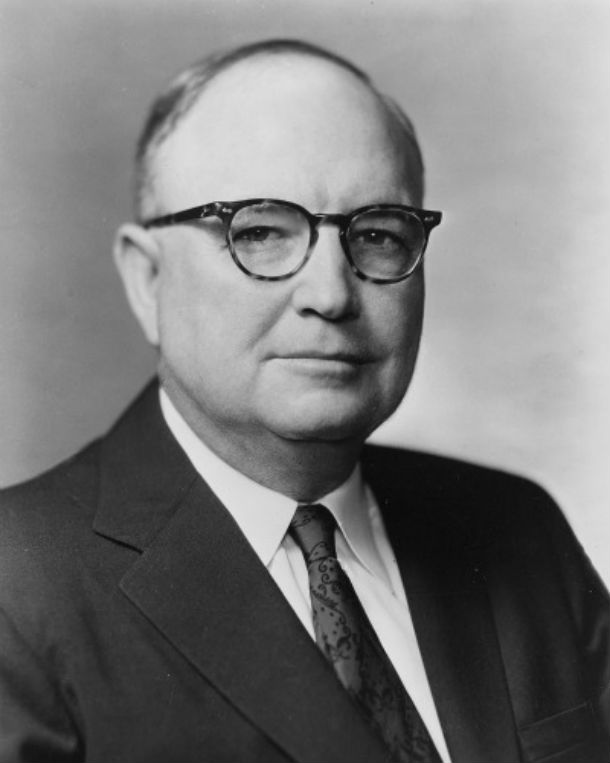

Nominee	James Eastland	Joe Moore
Party	Democratic	Republican
Popular vote	244,341	21,807
Percentage	91.8%	8.2%
- County results Eastland: 80-90% 90-100%
U.S. senator before election
James Eastland
Democratic
Elected U.S. senator
James Eastland
Democratic

Incumbent James Eastland, who had represented Mississippi in the Senate since 1943, was elected to another term in a landslide with 92% of the vote.

General election
Party	Candidate	Votes	%
Democratic	James Eastland (Incumbent)	244,341	91.81
Republican	Joe A. Moore	21,807	8.19
Majority		222,534	83.62
Turnout		266,148	
Democratic hold			

== Missouri (special) ==
Following the death of incumbent Thomas C. Hennings, Democrat Edward V. Long, incumbent Lieutenant Governor of Missouri, ran against Republican Lon Hocker for the open seat. Long defeated Hocker by just under seven percentage points.

1960 United States Senate special election in Missouri
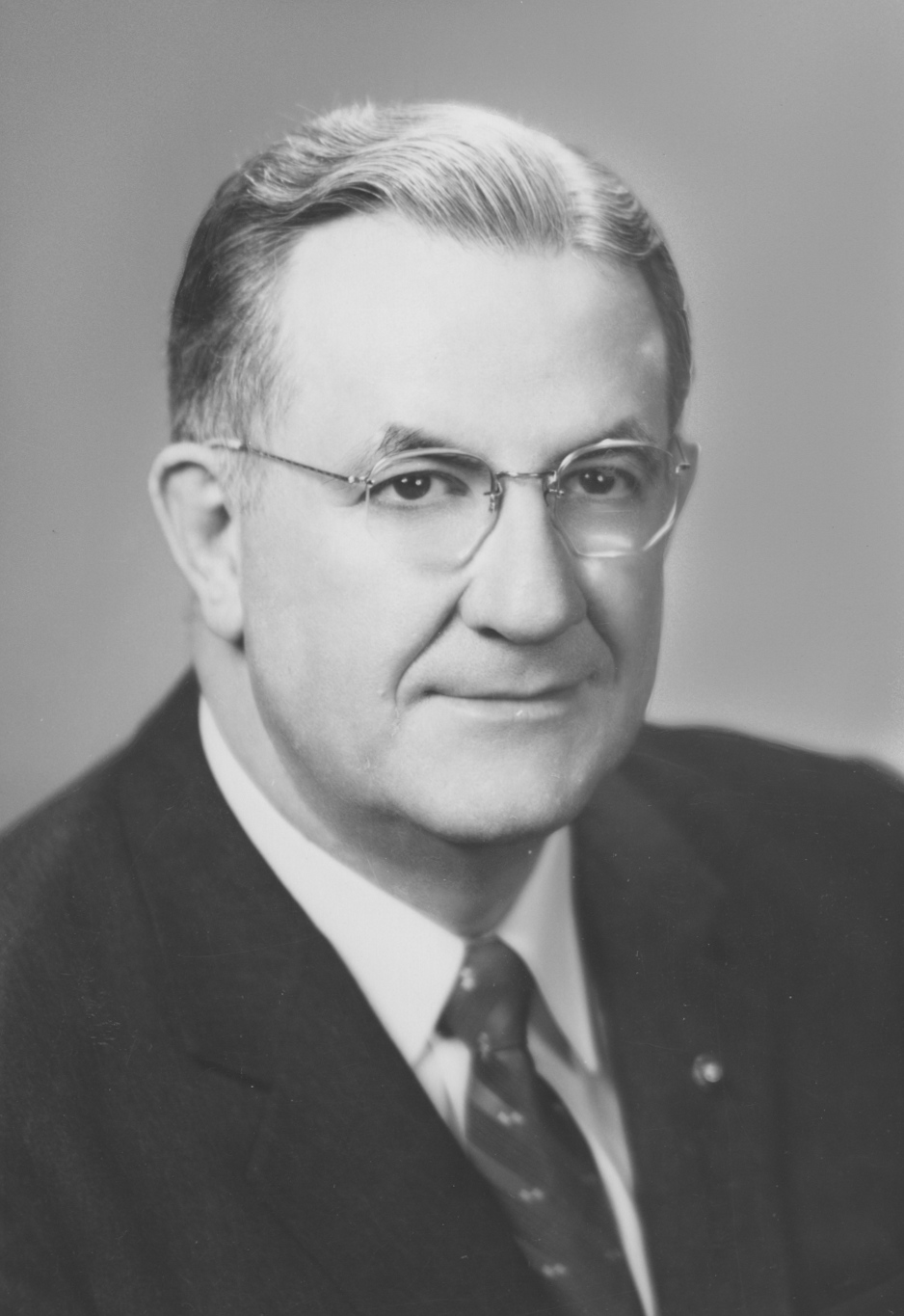
Nominee	Edward V. Long	Lon Hocker
Party	Democratic	Republican
Popular vote	999,656	880,576
Percentage	53.17%	46.83%
- County results Long: 50–60% 60–70% 70–80% 80–90% Hocker: 50–60% 60–70% 70–80%
U.S. senator before election
Edward V. Long
Democratic
Elected U.S. senator
Edward V. Long
Democratic

General election
Party	Candidate	Votes	%
Democratic	Edward V. Long	999,656	53.17
Republican	Lon Hocker	880,576	46.83
Majority		119,080	6.34
Turnout		1,880,232	
Democratic hold			

== Montana ==
1960 United States Senate election in Montana
- November 8, 1960
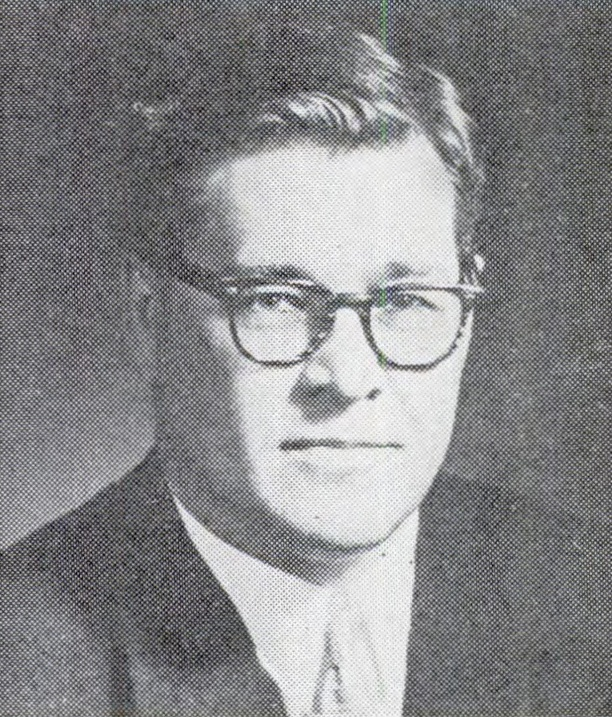

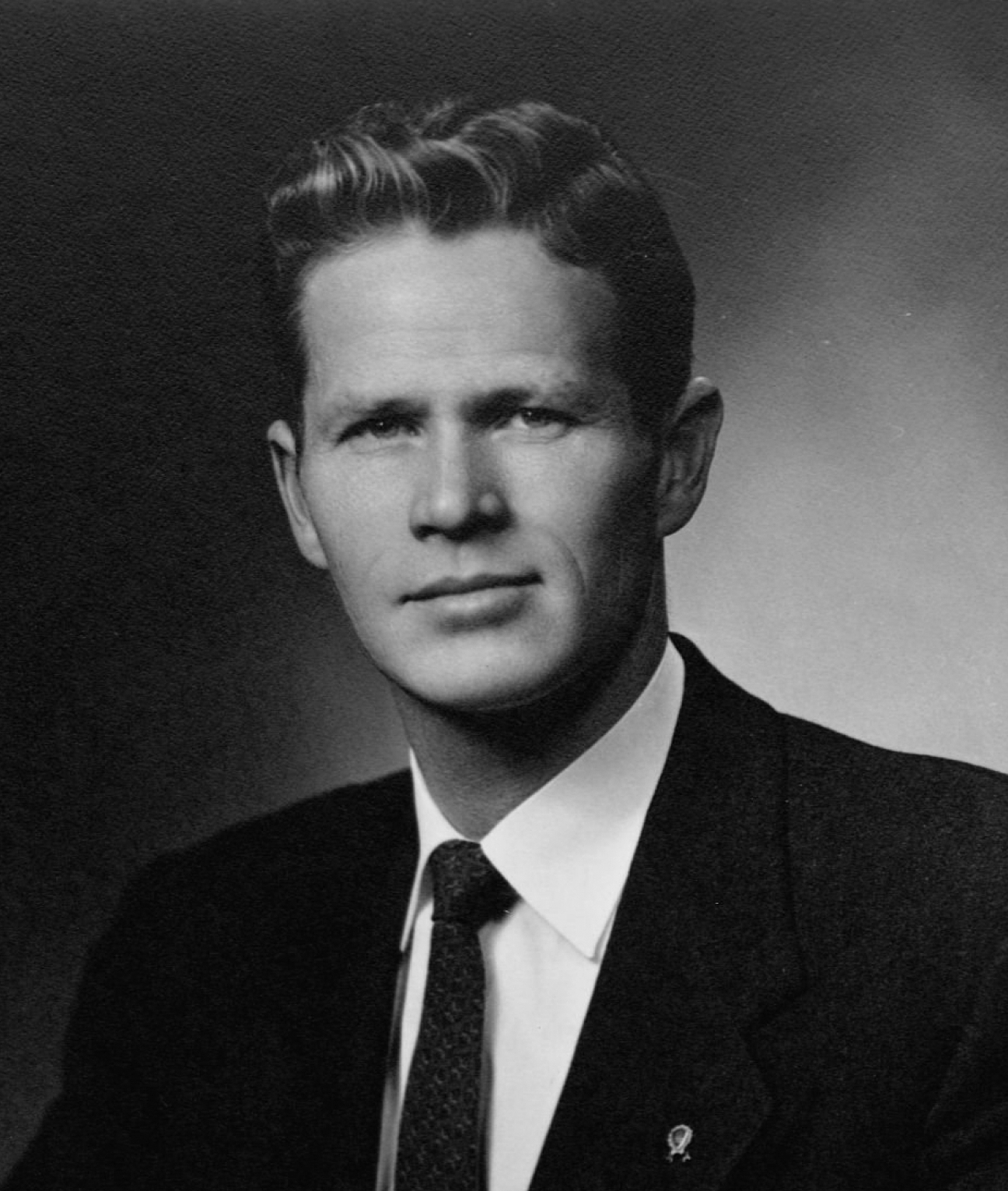
Nominee	Lee Metcalf	Orvin B. Fjare
Party	Democratic	Republican
Popular vote	140,331	136,281
Percentage	50.73%	49.27%
- County results Metcalf: 50–60% 60–70% Fjare: 50–60% 60–70% 70–80%
U.S. senator before election
James E. Murray
Democratic
Elected U.S. Senator
Lee Metcalf
Democratic

After the retirement of incumbent Democrat James E. Murray, Democrat and representative Lee Metcalf and Republican Orvin Fjare ran for the open seat. Metcalf kept the seat Democratic, winning by just over 1%. This was despite Richard Nixon winning Montana in the concurrent presidential election.

General election
Party	Candidate	Votes	%
Democratic	Lee Metcalf	140,331	50.73
Republican	Orvin B. Fjare	136,281	49.27
Majority		4,050	1.46
Turnout		276,612	
Democratic hold			

== Nebraska ==
1960 United States Senate election in Nebraska
- November 8, 1960
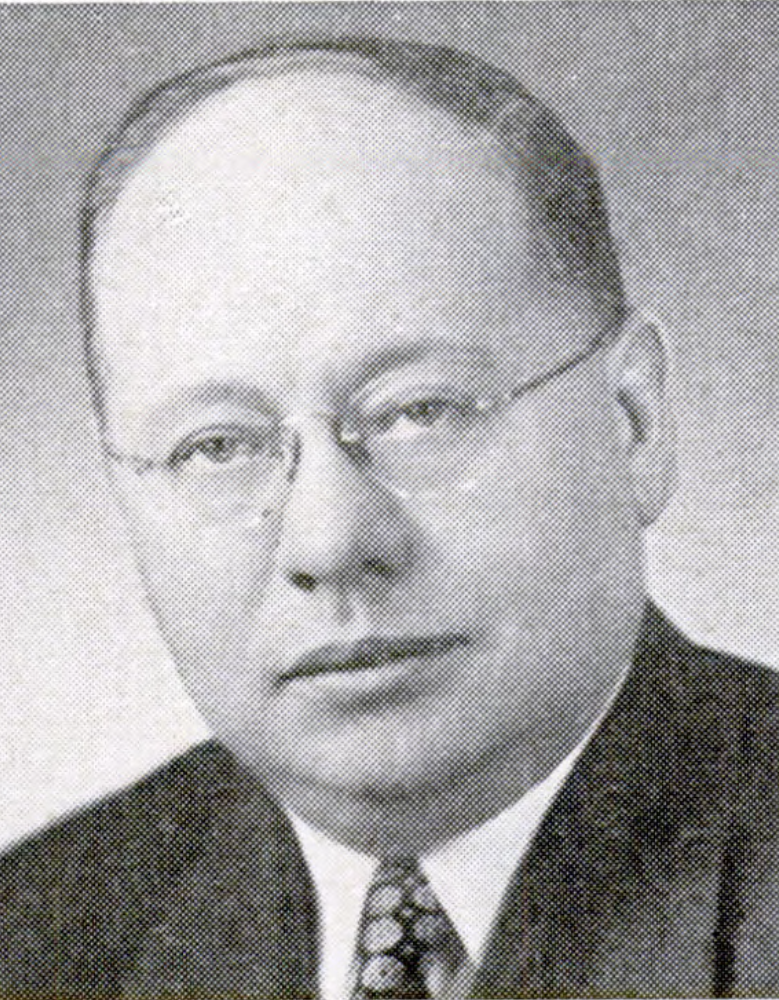

Nominee	Carl Curtis	Robert B. Conrad
Party	Republican	Democratic
Popular vote	352,748	245,807
Percentage	58.93%	41.07%
- County results Curtis: 50–60% 60–70% 70–80% Conrad: 50–60%
U.S. senator before election
Carl Curtis
Republican
Elected U.S. Senator
Carl Curtis
Republican

Republican Carl Curtis, who had served since 1955, was re-elected to a second term over Democrat Robert Conrad by nearly 17 percentage points. Curtis won all but four counties in the state.

General election
Party	Candidate	Votes	%
Republican	Carl T. Curtis (Incumbent)	352,748	58.91
Democratic	Robert B. Conrad	245,837	41.06
N/A	Scattering	158	0.03
Majority		106,941	17.86
Turnout		598,743	
Republican hold			

== New Hampshire ==
1960 United States Senate election in New Hampshire
- November 8, 1960
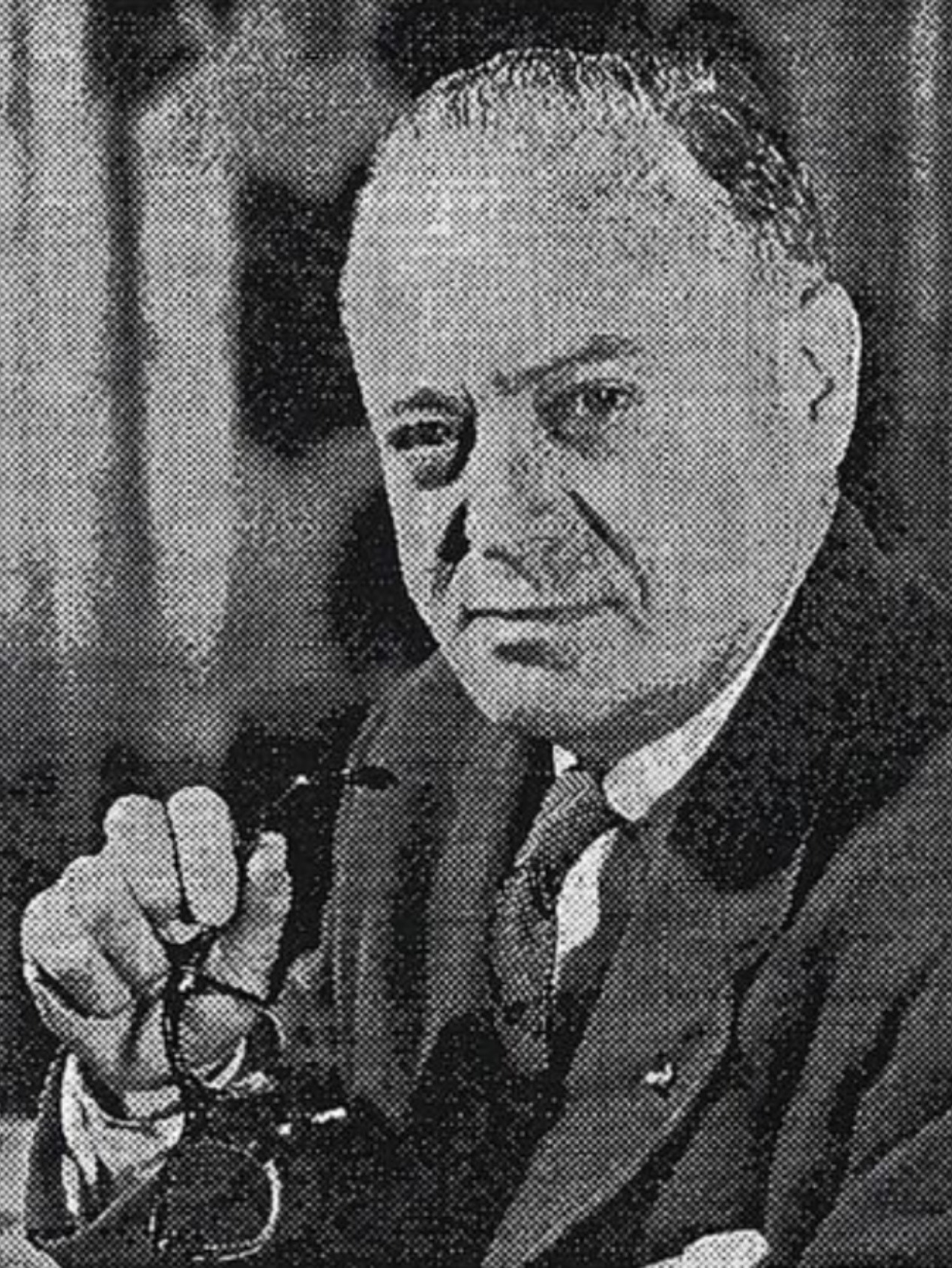

Nominee	Styles Bridges	Herbert W. Hill
Party	Republican	Democratic
Popular vote	173,521	114,024
Percentage	60.35%	39.65%
- Bridges: 50–60% 60–70% 70–80% 80–90% 90-100% Hill: 50–60% 60–70% 70–80%
U.S. senator before election
Styles Bridges
Republican
Elected U.S. Senator
Styles Bridges
Republican

General election
Party	Candidate	Votes	%
Republican	Styles Bridges (Incumbent)	173,521	60.35
Democratic	Herbert W. Hill	114,024	39.65
Majority		59,497	20.70
Turnout		287,545	
Republican hold			

Bridges died less than a year into his fifth term. With New Hampshire's other Senator Norris Cotton up for re-election in 1962 and following Bridges death. Both of New Hampshire's Senate seats would be up in the 1962 midterms.

== New Jersey ==
New Jersey election
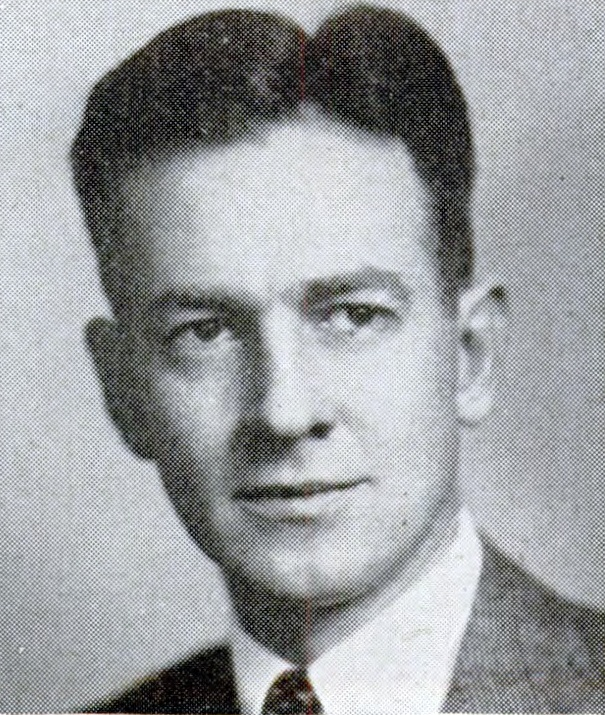

Nominee	Clifford P. Case	Thorn Lord
Party	Republican	Democratic
Popular vote	1,483,832	1,151,385
Percentage	55.69%	43.21%
- County results Case: 50-60% 60-70% 70-80% Lord: 50–60%
U.S. senator before election
Clifford P. Case
Republican
Elected U.S. senator
Clifford P. Case
Republican

Incumbent Republican Clifford P. Case won re-election against Democrat Thorn Lord. Case would win re-election a few more times in 1966 and 1972, before losing in the 1978 Republican primary.

General election
Party	Candidate	Votes	%
Republican	Clifford P. Case (Incumbent)	1,483,832	55.69
Democratic	Thorn Lord	1,151,385	43.21
Conservative	Winifred O. Perry	13,756	0.52
Socialist Labor	Albert Ronis	11,784	0.44
Socialist Workers	Gladys Grauer	3,599	0.14
Majority		332,447	12.48
Turnout		2,664,356	
Republican hold			

== New Mexico ==
1960 United States Senate election in New Mexico
- November 8, 1960
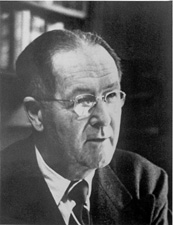

Nominee	Clinton Anderson	William F. Colwes
Party	Democratic	Republican
Popular vote	190,654	109,987
Percentage	63.43%	36.57%
- County results Anderson: 50–60% 60–70% 70–80% Colwes: 50–60%
U.S. senator before election
Clinton Anderson
Democratic
Elected U.S. Senator
Clinton Anderson
Democratic

General election
Party	Candidate	Votes	%
Democratic	Clinton Anderson (Incumbent)	190,654	63.43
Republican	William Colwes	109,897	36.57
Majority		80,757	26.86
Turnout		300,551	
Democratic hold			

== North Carolina ==
1960 United States Senate election in North Carolina
- November 8, 1960
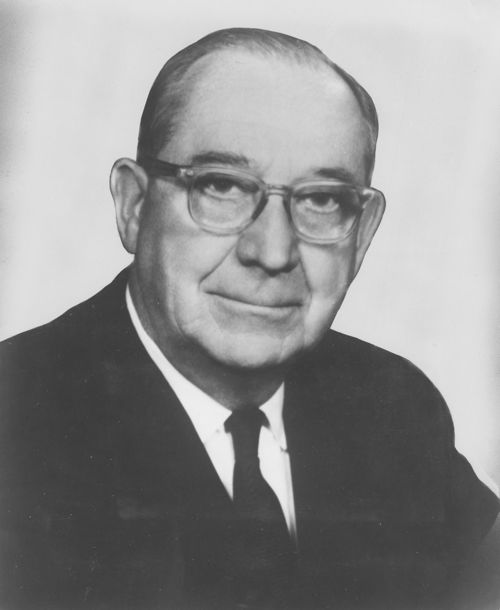

Nominee	B. Everett Jordan	R. Kyle Hayes
Party	Democratic	Republican
Popular vote	793,521	497,964
Percentage	61.44%	38.56%
- County results Jordan: 50–60% 60–70% 70–80% 80–90% >90% Hayes: 50–60% 60–70% 70–80%
Senator before election
B. Everett Jordan
Democratic
Elected Senator
B. Everett Jordan
Democratic

Incumbent Democrat B. Everett Jordan was re-elected to his first full term after winning a special election in 1958. He defeated Republican Kyle Hayes by a slightly slimmer margin than he defeated his Republican challenger in 1958.

General election
Party	Candidate	Votes	%
Democratic	B. Everett Jordan (Incumbent)	793,521	61.44
Republican	Kyle Hayes	497,964	38.56
Majority		295,557	22.88
Turnout		1,291,485	
Democratic hold			

== North Dakota (special) ==
1960 United States Senate special election in North Dakota
- June 28, 1960
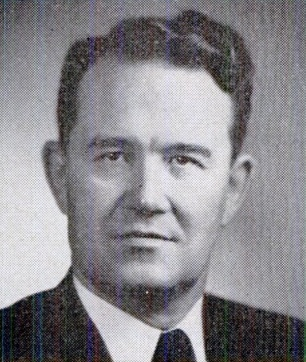

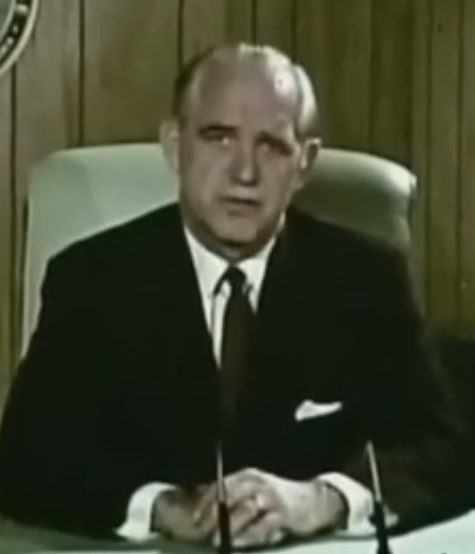
Nominee	Quentin Burdick	John E. Davis
Party	Democratic–NPL	Republican
Popular vote	104,593	103,475
Percentage	49.72%	49.19%
County results
Burdick:
40-50%
50-60%
60-70%
Davis:
40-50%
50-60%
60-70%
U.S. senator before election
Norman Brunsdale
Republican
Elected U.S. Senator
Quentin Burdick
Democratic

A special election was held June 28, 1960, to fill the seat vacated by William Langer, who died November 8, 1959. Clarence Norman Brunsdale, a former Governor of North Dakota, was temporarily appointed to the seat on November 19 of that year until the special election was held. North Dakota Democratic-NPL Party candidate Quentin N. Burdick faced Republican John E. Davis for election to the seat. Davis had been serving as Governor of the state since 1957.

North Dakota special election
Party	Candidate	Votes	%
Democratic–NPL	Quentin N. Burdick	104,593	49.72
Republican	John E. Davis	103,475	49.19
Independent	Eugene Van Der Hoeven	1,337	0.64
Independent	Clarence Haggard	934	0.45
Turnout		163,311	

== Oklahoma ==
Oklahoma election
- November 8, 1960
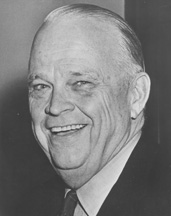

Nominee	Robert S. Kerr	B. Hayden Crawford
Party	Democratic	Republican
Popular vote	474,116	385,646
Percentage	54.84%	44.61%
- County results Kerr: 50–60% 60–70% 70–80% Crawford: 50–60% 60–70%
U.S. senator before election
Robert S. Kerr
Democratic
Elected U.S. Senator
Robert S. Kerr
Democratic

Incumbent Democrat Robert Kerr won re-election to a third term, though he would die before the term was up and would be replaced by J. Democrat Howard Edmondson.

General election
Party	Candidate	Votes	%
Democratic	Robert S. Kerr (Incumbent)	474,116	54.84
Republican	B. Hayden Crawford	385,646	44.61
Independent	Billy E. Brown	4,713	0.55
Majority		88,470	10.23
Turnout		864,475	
Democratic hold			

== Oregon ==
1960 United States Senate elections in Oregon
- November 8, 1960
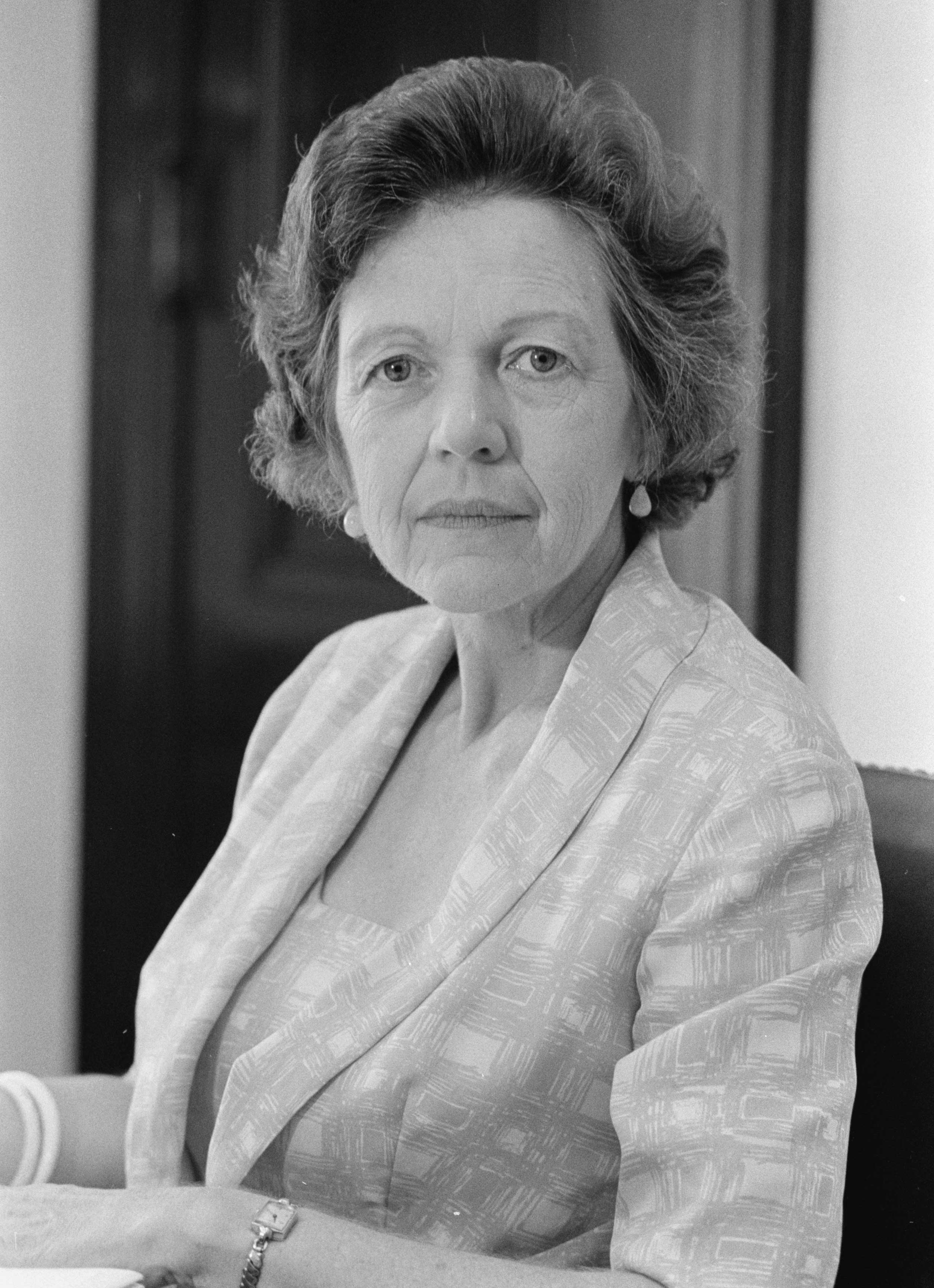

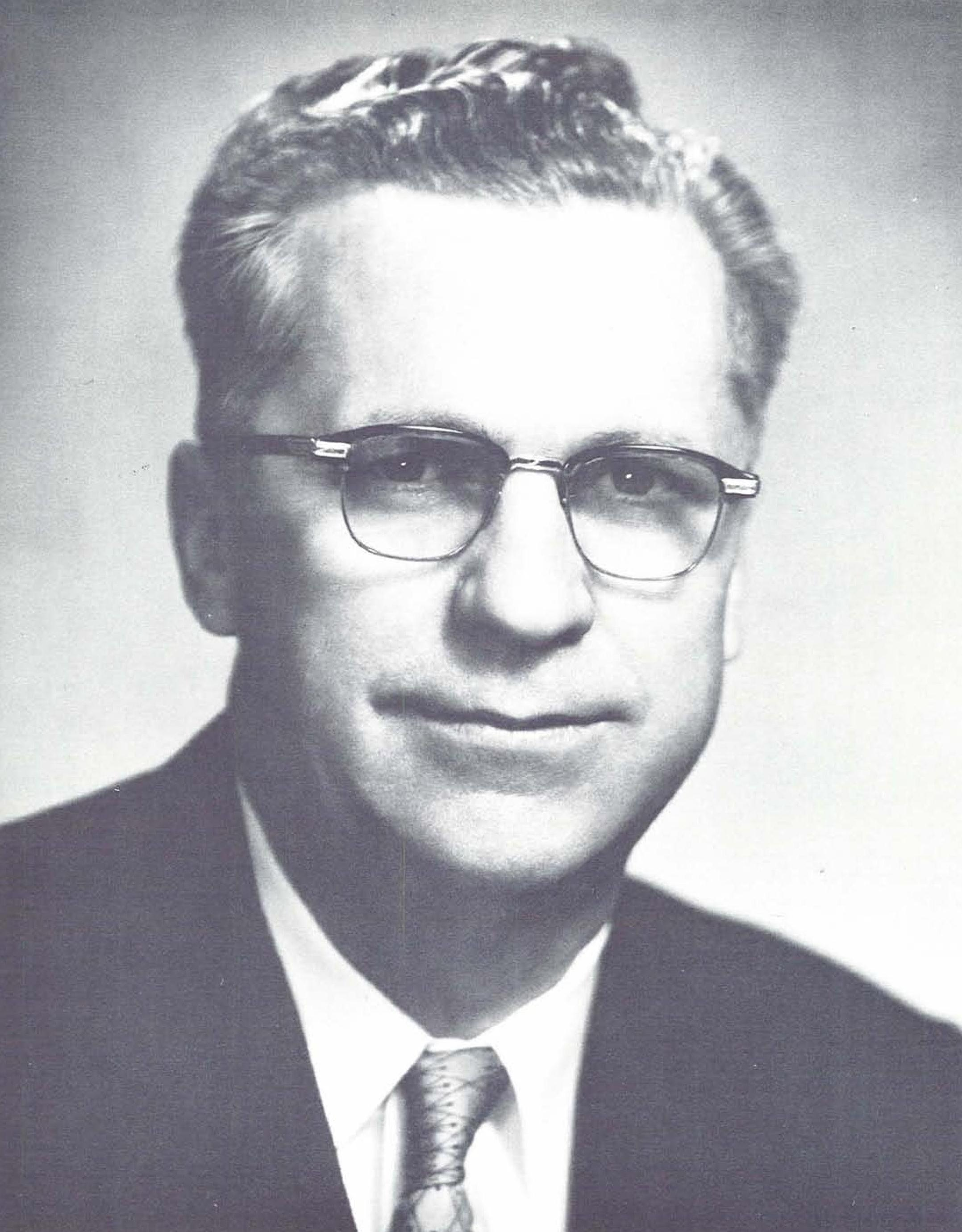
Nominee	Maurine Neuberger	Elmo Smith
Party	Democratic	Republican
Regular election	412,757; 54.61%	343,009; 45.38%
Special election	422,024; 54.98%	345,464; 45.01%
- Regular/special election county results (Note: While there were some slight differences in the particular percentages, the county results for the regular and special elections, both in their winners and percent ranges, were identical.); Neuberger: 50–60% 60–70% Smith: 50-60%
U.S. senator before election
Hall S. Lusk
Democratic
Elected U.S. Senator
Maurine Neuberger
Democratic

First-term Democrat Richard L. Neuberger had been diagnosed with testicular cancer in 1958 that became terminal by 1960 — but was kept from the public. Neuberger remained at home in early 1960, reportedly battling the flu. Though still publicly seeking re-election, he told his campaign chair, attorney Jack Beatty, "Remember, there's always another Neuberger," referring to his wife. The comment, combined with Neuberger's reluctance to meet in public and weak voice on the phone, led Beatty to believe that Neuberger's condition was grave, a suspicion confirmed by the Senator's physician shortly before Neuberger died at Good Samaritan Hospital on March 9, 1960.

Democratic Oregon Supreme Court judge Hall S. Lusk was appointed March 16, 1960, to continue the term, pending a special election in which he was not a candidate.

Primaries were held May 20, 1960, in which Neuberger's widow, Democrat Maurine B. Neuberger and the Republican former-Governor of Oregon Elmo Smith easily won nomination.

Maurine Brown Neuberger was elected November 8, 1960, both to finish the term and to the next term.

=== Oregon (special) ===
Special election
Party	Candidate	Votes	%
Democratic	Maurine B. Neuberger	422,024	54.99
Republican	Elmo Smith	345,464	45.01
Majority		76,560	9.98
Turnout		767,488	
Democratic hold			

=== Oregon (regular) ===
General election
Party	Candidate	Votes	%
Democratic	Maurine B. Neuberger	412,757	54.61
Republican	Elmo Smith	343,009	45.38
Majority		76,560	9.23
Turnout		755,875	42.74
Democratic hold			

Maurine Brown Neuberger retired at the end of the term.

== Rhode Island ==
1960 United States Senate election in Rhode Island
- November 8, 1960
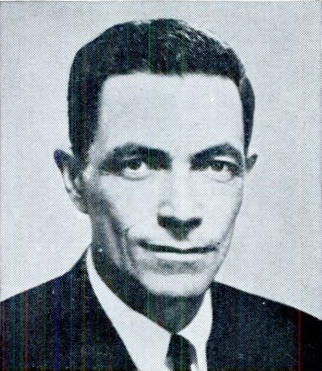

Nominee	Claiborne Pell	Raoul Archambault Jr.
Party	Democratic	Republican
Popular vote	275,575	124,408
Percentage	68.90%	31.10%
- County results Pell: 50–60% 60–70% 70–80%
U.S. senator before election
Theodore F. Green
Democratic
Elected U.S. Senator
Claiborne Pell
Democratic

General election
Party	Candidate	Votes	%
Democratic	Claiborne Pell	275,575	68.90
Republican	Raoul Archambault Jr.	124,408	31.10
Majority		151,167	37.80
Turnout		399,983	
Democratic hold			

== South Carolina ==
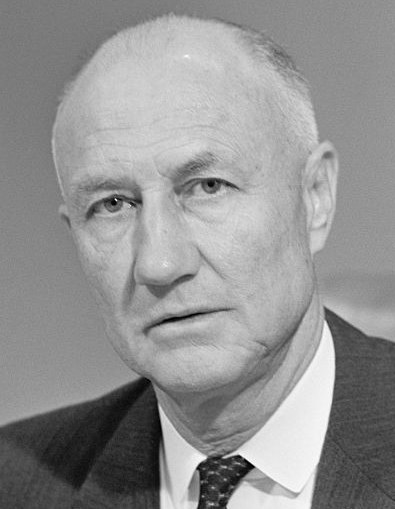
Senator Strom Thurmond

General election
Party	Candidate	Votes	%
Democratic	Strom Thurmond (Incumbent)	330,167	99.97
None	Write-Ins	102	0.03
Majority		330,065	99.94
Turnout		330,269	
Democratic hold			

== South Dakota ==
1960 United States Senate election in South Dakota
- November 8, 1960
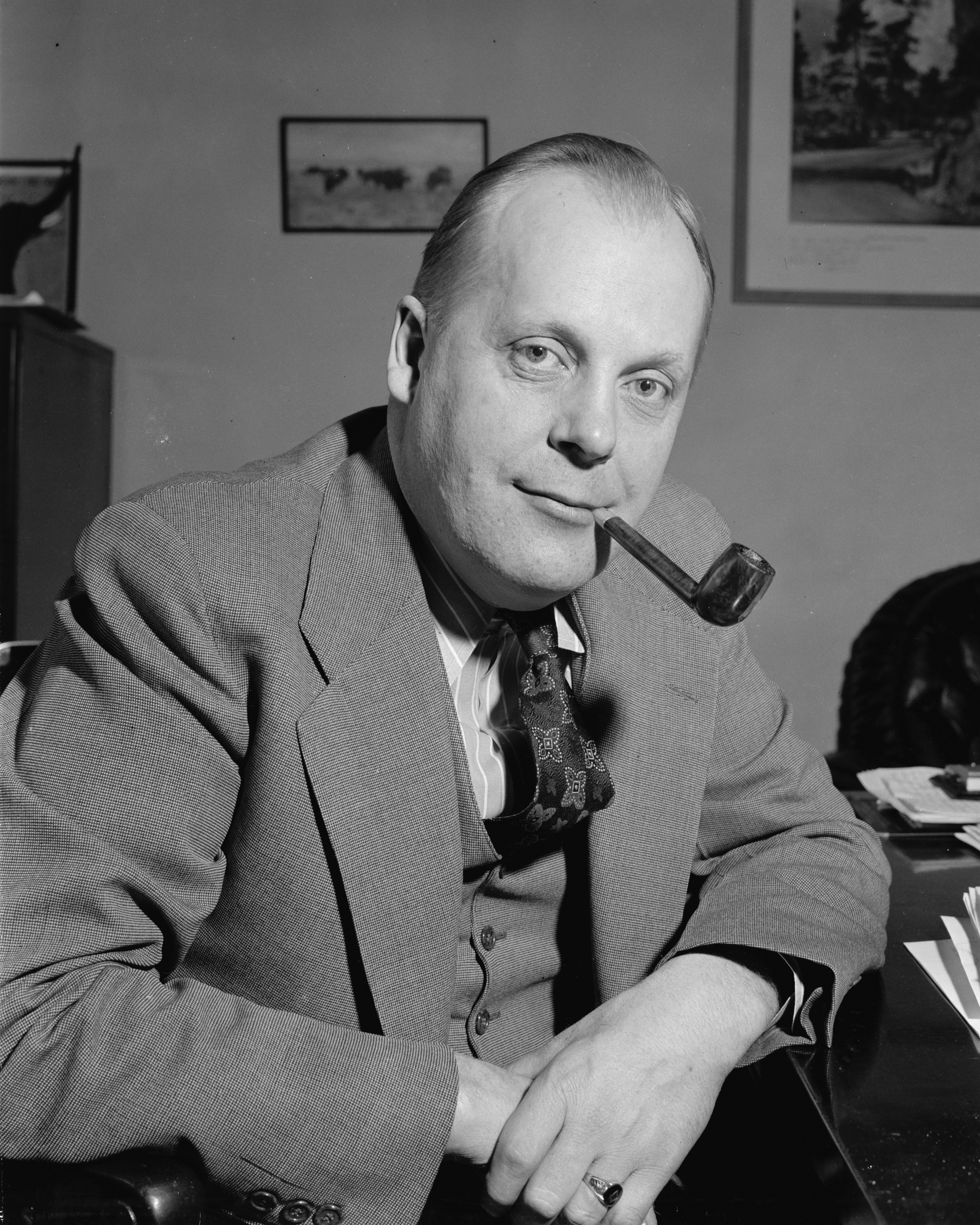

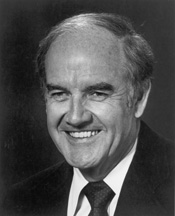
Nominee	Karl E. Mundt	George McGovern
Party	Republican	Democratic
Popular vote	160,181	145,261
Percentage	52.44%	47.56%
- County results Mundt: 50–60% 60–70% 70–80% McGovern: 50–60% 60–70%
U.S. senator before election
Karl E. Mundt
Republican
Elected U.S. Senator
Karl E. Mundt
Republican

General election
Party	Candidate	Votes	%
Republican	Karl Mundt (Incumbent)	160,181	52.44
Democratic	George McGovern	145,261	47.56
Majority		14,920	4.88
Turnout		305,442	
Republican hold			

== Tennessee ==
1960 United States Senate election in Tennessee
- November 8, 1960
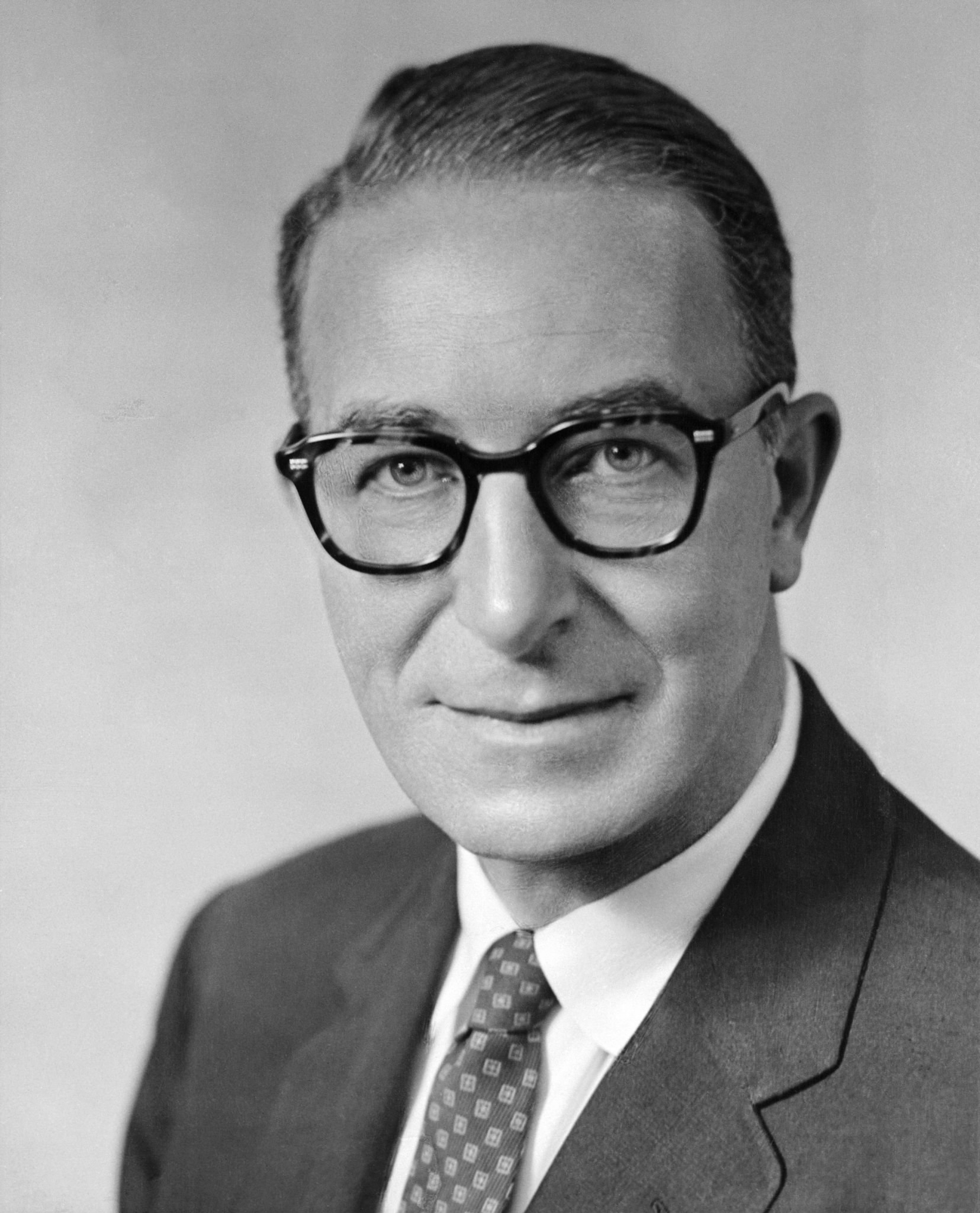

Nominee	Estes Kefauver	A. Bradley Frazier
Party	Democratic	Republican
Popular vote	594,460	234,053
Percentage	71.75%	28.25%
- Kefauver: 50–60% 60–70% 70–80% 80–90% 90-100% Frazier: 50–60%
Senator before election
Estes Kefauver
Democratic
Elected Senator
Estes Kefauver
Democratic

General election
Party	Candidate	Votes	%
Democratic	Estes Kefauver (Incumbent)	594,460	71.75
Republican	A. Bradley Frazier	234,053	28.25
Write-in	Write-Ins	6	0.00
Majority		360,407	43.50
Turnout		828,519	
Democratic hold			

== Texas ==
Texas election
- November 8, 1960
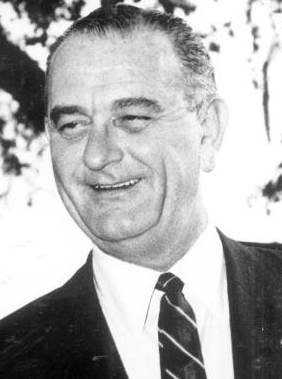

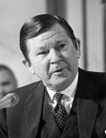
Nominee	Lyndon B. Johnson	John Tower
Party	Democratic	Republican
Popular vote	1,306,625	926,653
Percentage	57.98%	41.12%
- County results Johnson: 50–60% 60–70% 70–80% 80–90% >90% Tower: 50–60% 60–70%
U.S. senator before election
Lyndon B. Johnson
Democratic
Elected U.S. Senator
Lyndon B. Johnson
(did not take office)
Democratic

Incumbent two-term Democrat Lyndon Johnson was easily re-elected, but he was also elected the same day as Vice President with John F. Kennedy being elected president. This was the last election in which a Democrat was selected to Texas's class 2 Senate seat.

General election
Party	Candidate	Votes	%
Democratic	Lyndon Johnson (Incumbent)	1,306,625	57.97
Republican	John Tower	926,653	41.12
Constitution	Bard W. Logan	20,506	0.91
Majority		379,972	16.85
Turnout		2,253,784	
Democratic hold			

Johnson resigned January 3, 1961 — before the new Congress began — and former Democratic senator William A. Blakley was appointed to begin the term, pending a special election. Republican John Tower, who lost to Johnson here in 1960, would win that May 1961 special election.

== Virginia ==
1960 United States Senate election in Virginia
- November 8, 1960
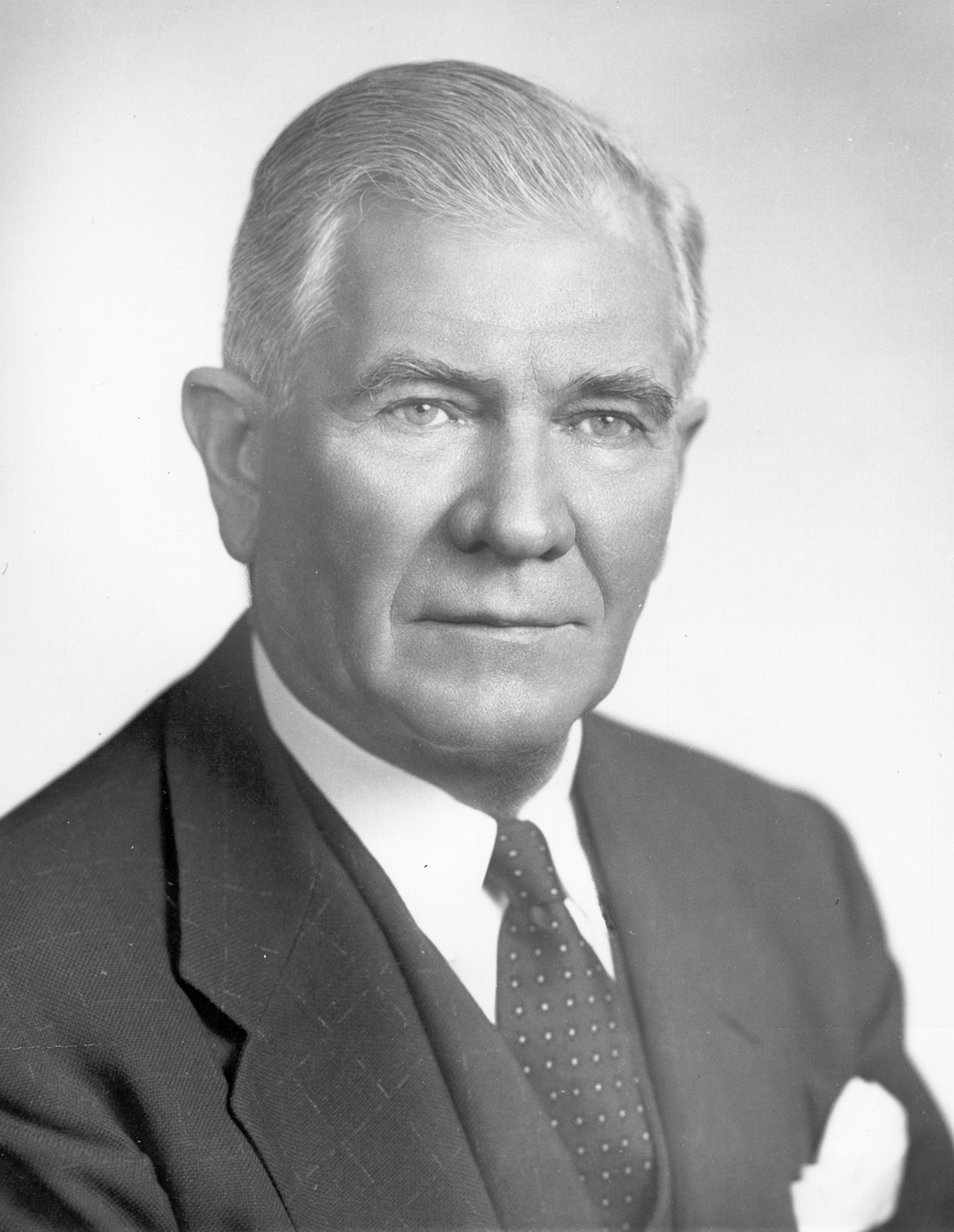

Nominee	Absalom Willis Robertson	Stuart D. Baker
Party	Democratic	Independent Democrat
Popular vote	506,169	88,718
Percentage	81.27%	14.24%
- County and independent city results Robertson: 60–70% 70–80% 80–90% >90% Baker: 50-60%
U.S. senator before election
Absalom Willis Robertson
Democratic
Elected U.S. Senator
Absalom Willis Robertson
Democratic

Incumbent Democrat Absalom Willis Robertson was overwhelmingly re-elected with 81% of the vote, facing no Republican opposition.

General election
Party	Candidate	Votes	%
Democratic	A. Willis Robertson (Incumbent)	506,169	81.27
Independent Democratic	Stuart D. Baker	88,718	14.24
Social Democratic	Clarke T. Robbe	26,783	4.30
None	Scattering	1,150	0.18
Majority		417,451	67.03
Turnout		622,820	
Democratic hold			

== West Virginia ==
West Virginia election
- November 8, 1960
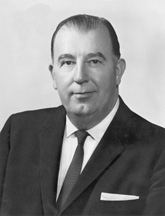

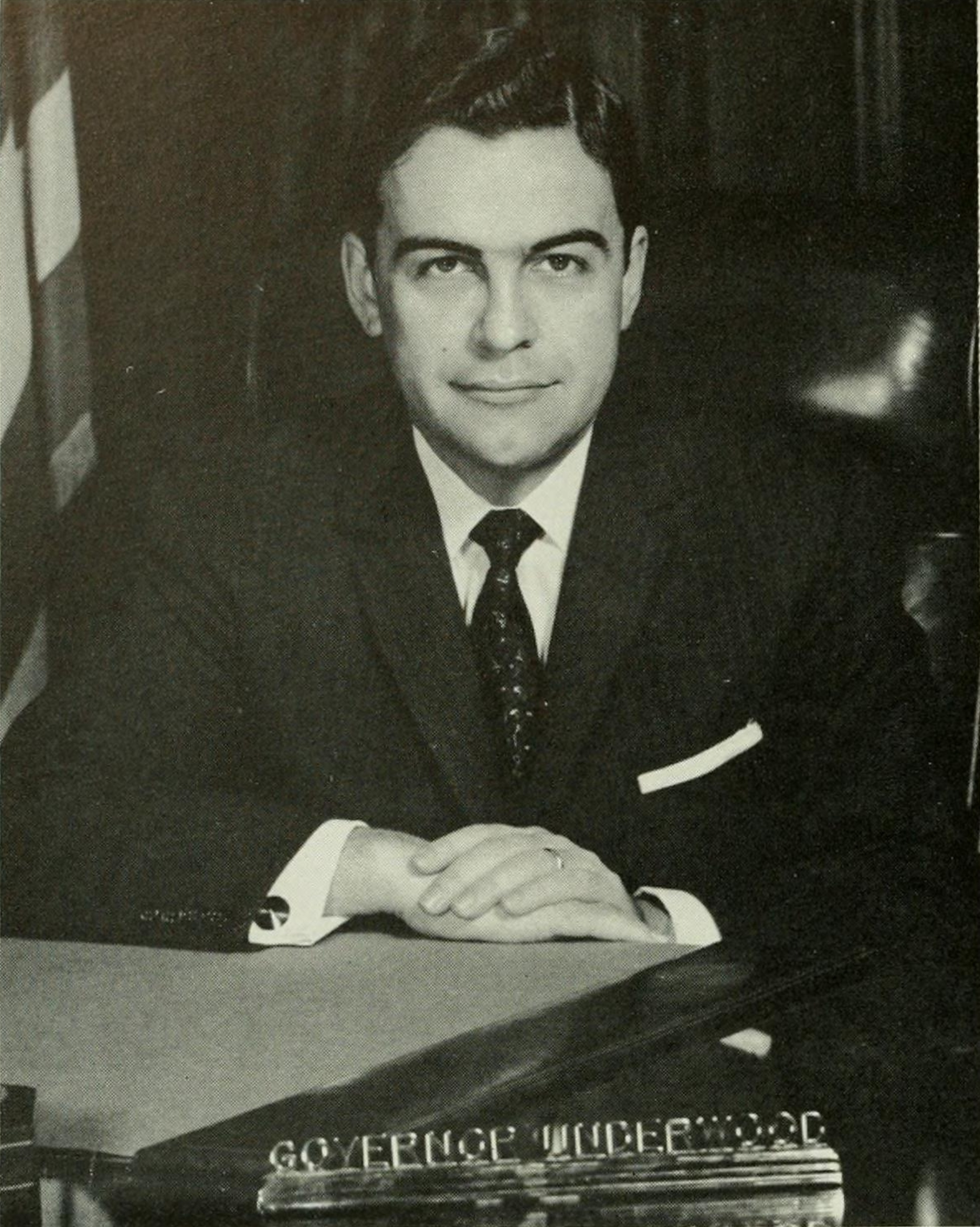
Nominee	Jennings Randolph	Cecil H. Underwood
Party	Democratic	Republican
Popular vote	458,355	369,935
Percentage	55.3%	44.7%
- County results Randolph: 50–60% 60–70% 70–80% 80–90% Underwood: 50–60% 60–70% 70–80%
U.S. senator before election
Jennings Randolph
Democratic
Elected U.S. Senator
Jennings Randolph
Democratic

Incumbent Jennings Randolph won re-election against Cecil Underwood, the incumbent governor of West Virginia.

General election
Party	Candidate	Votes	%
Democratic	Jennings Randolph (Incumbent)	458,355	55.34
Republican	Cecil Underwood	369,935	44.66
None	Write-Ins	2	0.00
Majority		88,420	10.68
Turnout		828,292	
Democratic hold			

== Wyoming ==
1960 United States Senate election in Wyoming
- November 8, 1960
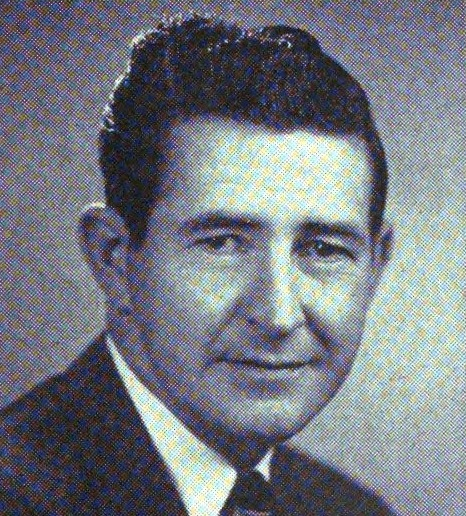

Nominee	Keith Thomson	Raymond B. Whitaker
Party	Republican	Democratic
Popular vote	78,103	60,447
Percentage	56.37%	43.63%
- County results Thomson: 50–60% 60–70% 70–80% Whitaker: 50–60% 60–70%
U.S. senator before election
Joseph C. O'Mahoney
Democratic
Elected U.S. Senator
Edwin Keith Thomson (died before taking office)
Republican

General election
Party	Candidate	Votes	%
Republican	Edwin Keith Thomson	78,103	56.37
Democratic	Raymond B. Whitaker	60,447	43.63
Majority		17,656	12.74
Turnout		138,550	
Republican gain from Democratic			

Senator-Elect Thomson died a month after his election.

== See also ==
- 1960 United States elections
  - 1960 United States presidential election
  - 1960 United States House of Representatives elections
- 86th United States Congress
- 87th United States Congress

== Bibliography ==
- Congressional Elections, 1946-1996. Washington, D.C.: Congressional Quarterly Inc. 1998. ISBN 1-56802-248-4.
- Martin, Mark (2018). "Historical Report of the Secretary of State" (PDF). Little Rock, Arkansas: Arkansas Secretary of State's Office. ISBN 978-0-692-03553-5.
