= 1960 United States Senate election in Tennessee =

- November 8, 1960
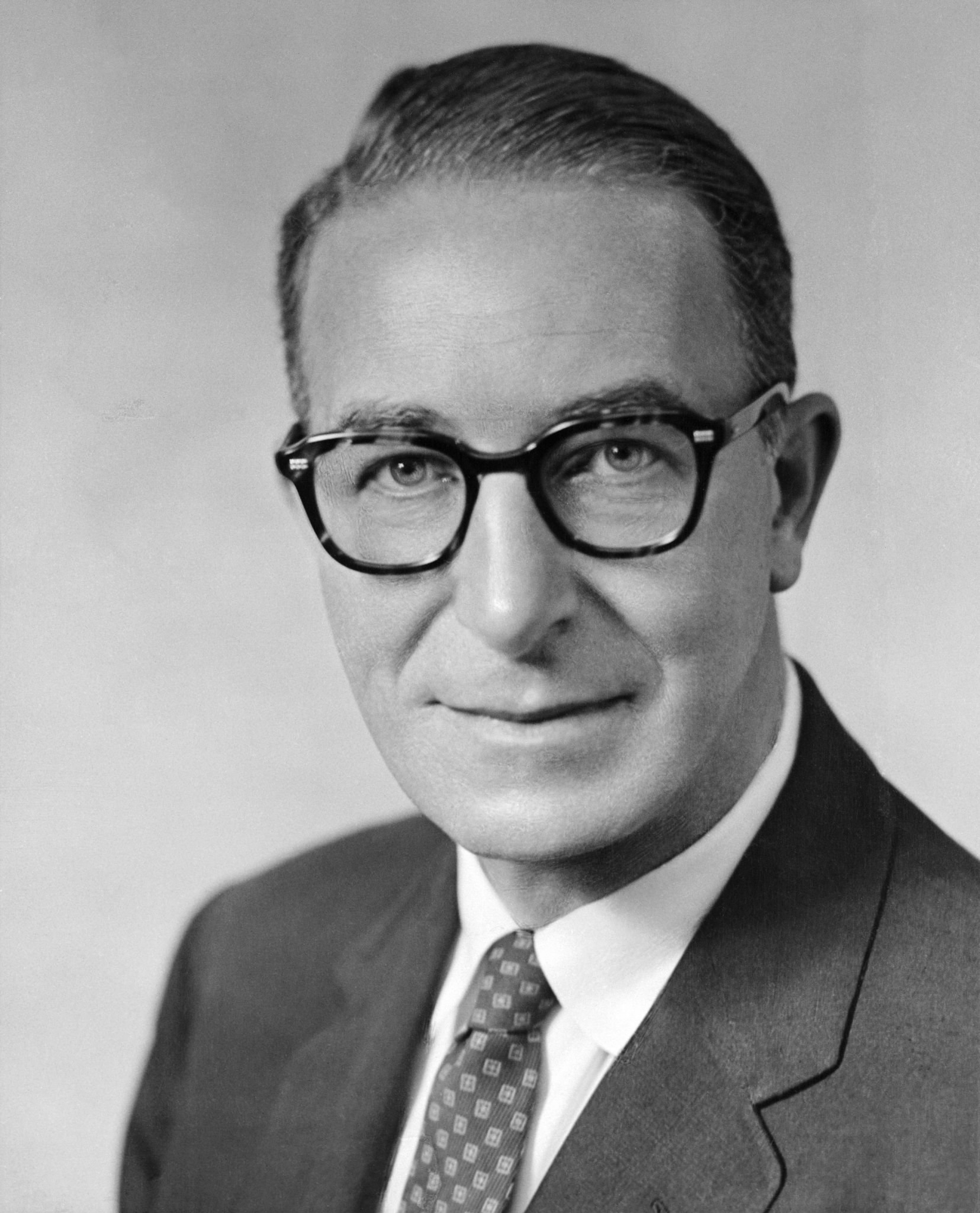

Nominee	Estes Kefauver	A. Bradley Frazier
Party	Democratic	Republican
Popular vote	594,460	234,053
Percentage	71.75%	28.25%
- County results Kefauver: 50–60% 60–70% 70–80% 80–90% 90–100% Frazier: 50–60%
Senator before election
Estes Kefauver
Democratic
Elected Senator
Estes Kefauver
Democratic

The 1960 United States Senate election in Tennessee took place on November 8, 1960, concurrently with the U.S. presidential election, as well as elections to the United States Senate in other states as well as elections to the United States House of Representatives and various state and local elections. Incumbent Democratic Senator Estes Kefauver won re-election, defeating Republican candidate A. Bradley Frazier.

== Democratic primary ==
=== Candidates ===
- Estes Kefauver, incumbent Senator
- Andrew Taylor
- Jake Armstrong

34% of the voting age population participated in the Democratic primary.

=== Results ===
Democratic Party primary results
Party	Candidate	Votes	%
Democratic	Estes Kefauver (incumbent)	463,848	64.60%
Democratic	Andrew Taylor	249,336	34.72%
Democratic	Jake Armstrong	4,867	0.68%

== Republican primary ==
=== Candidates ===
- A. Bradley Frazier
- Hansel Proffitt

1.3% of the voting age population participated in the Republican primary.

=== Results ===
Republican Party primary results
Party	Candidate	Votes	%
Republican	A. Bradley Frazier	16,633	58.77%
Republican	Hansel Proffitt	11,667	41.23%

== General election ==
General election results
Party	Candidate	Votes	%
Democratic	Estes Kefauver (incumbent)	594,460	71.75%
Republican	A. Bradley Frazier	234,053	28.25%

== See also ==
- 1960 United States Senate elections

== Works cited ==
- Steed, Robert; Moreland, Laurence; Baker, Tod, eds. (1980). Party Politics in the South. Praeger Publishers. ISBN 0030565863.
