= 1960 United States Senate election in Louisiana =

- November 8, 1960
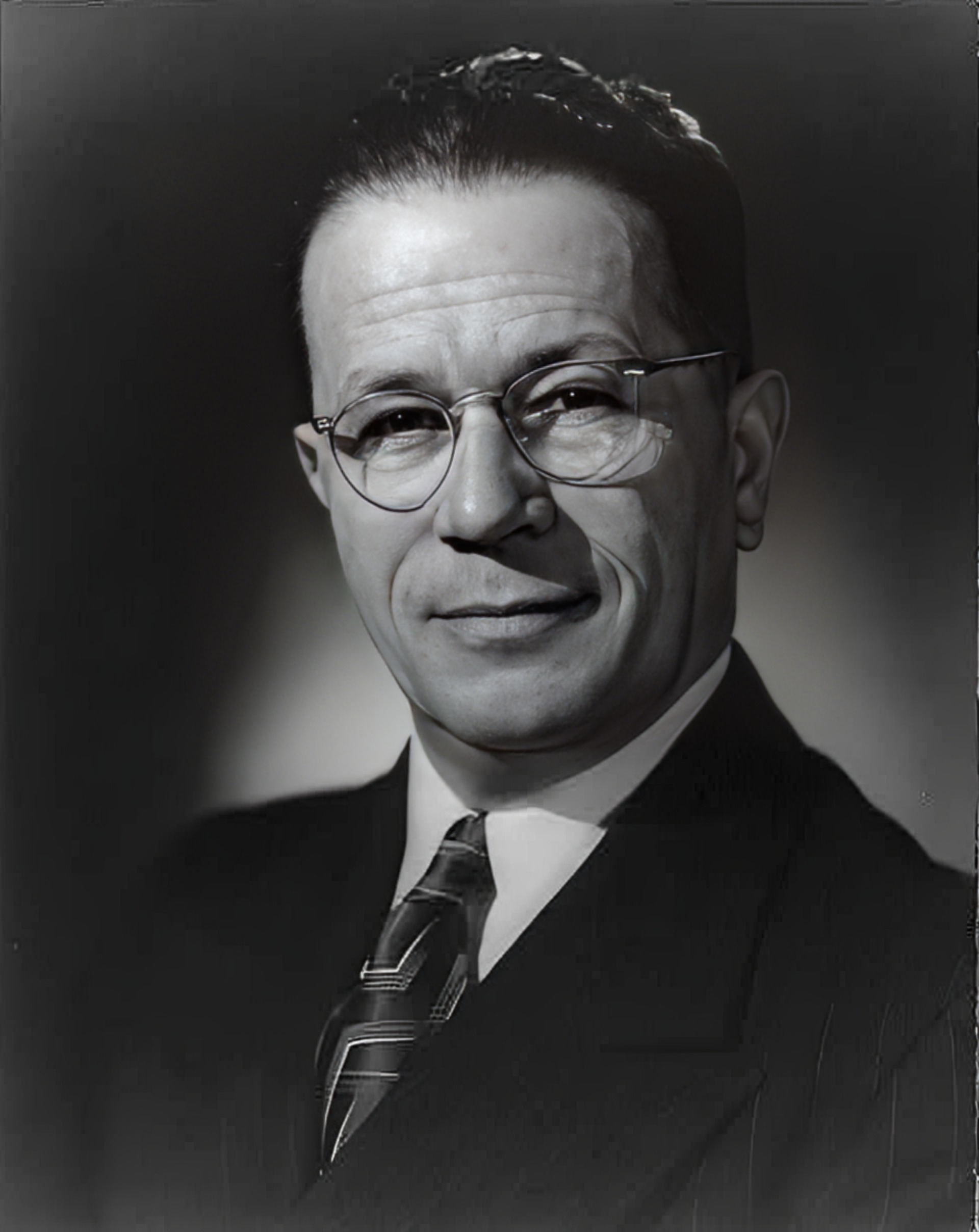

Nominee	Allen J. Ellender	George W. Reese Jr.
Party	Democratic	Republican
Popular vote	432,228	109,698
Percentage	79.76%	20.24%
- Parish results Ellender: 60–70% 70–80% 80–90% >90%
U.S. senator before election
Allen J. Ellender
Democratic
Elected U.S. Senator
Allen J. Ellender
Democratic

The 1960 United States Senate election in Louisiana took place on November 8, 1960. Incumbent Democratic Senator Allen J. Ellender won re-election to a fifth term.

== Primary elections ==
Primary elections were held on July 23, 1960.

=== Democratic primary ===
==== Candidates ====
- Allen J. Ellender, incumbent U.S. Senator, unopposed

==== Results ====
Democratic primary results
Party	Candidate	Votes	%
Democratic	Allen J. Ellender (incumbent)	unopposed	

=== Republican primary ===
==== Candidates ====
- William Dane, former real estate salesman
- George W. Reese Jr., attorney and Republican National Committeeman for Louisiana

==== Results ====
There were 8,588 registered voters in the Louisiana primary.

Republican primary results (Note: One source gives Reese 726 votes.)
Party	Candidate	Votes	%
Republican	George W. Reese Jr.	762	73.27
Republican	William Dane	278	26.73
Total votes		1,040	

== General election ==
=== Results ===
1960 United States Senate election in Louisiana
Party	Candidate	Votes	%
Democratic	Allen J. Ellender (Incumbent)	432,228	79.76
Republican	George W. Reese Jr.	109,698	20.24
Write-in		2	0.00
Majority		322,530	59.52
Turnout		541,928	
Democratic hold			

== See also ==
- 1960 United States Senate elections

== Bibliography ==
- Congressional Elections, 1946-1996. Washington, D.C.: Congressional Quarterly Inc. 1998. ISBN 1-56802-248-4.
