= 1954 United States Senate election in Virginia =

- November 2, 1954
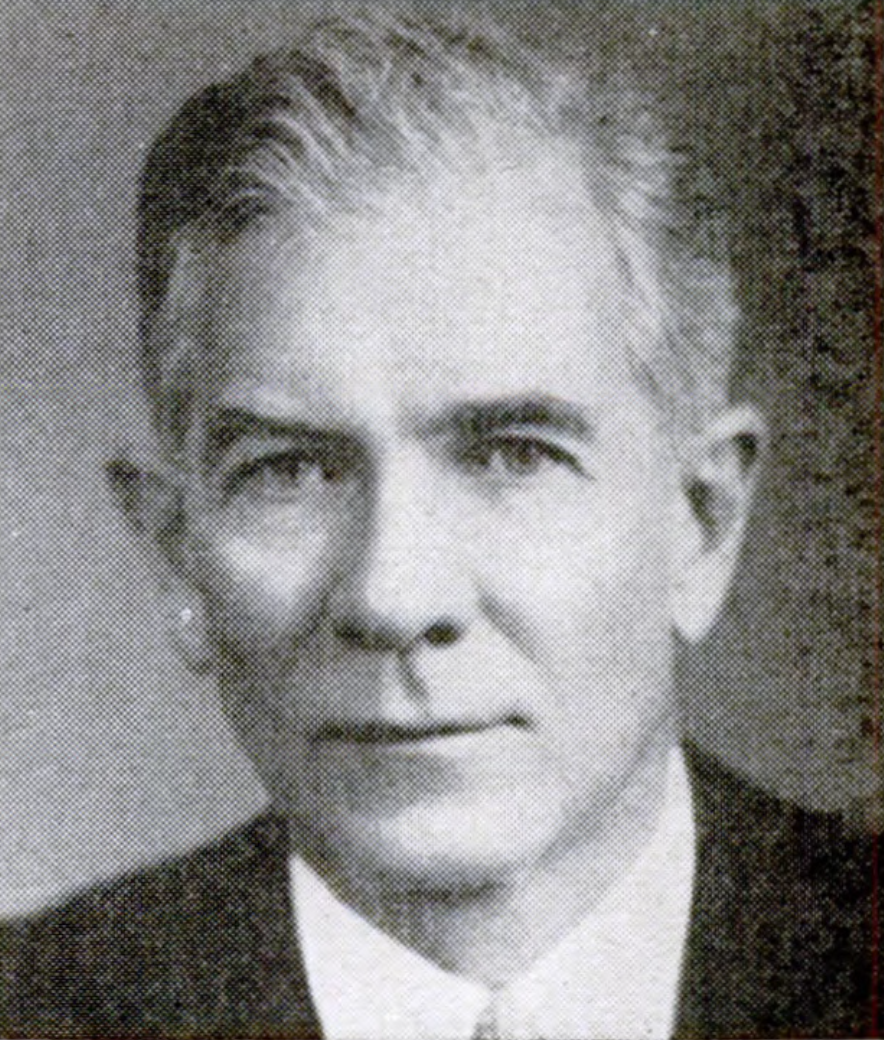

Nominee	Absalom Willis Robertson	Charles W. Lewis, Jr.	Clarke T. Robb
Party	Democratic	Independent Democrat	Independent
Popular vote	244,844	32,681	28,922
Percentage	79.88%	10.66%	9.44%
- County and independent city results Robertson: 50–60% 60–70% 70–80% 80–90% >90% Lewis: 40–50%
U.S. senator before election
Absalom Willis Robertson
Democratic
Elected U.S. Senator
Absalom Willis Robertson
Democratic

The 1954 United States Senate election in Virginia was held on November 2, 1954. Democratic incumbent Senator Absalom Willis Robertson defeated Independent Democrat Charles Lewis and Independent Clarke Robb and was re-elected to a second term in office.

== Results ==
United States Senate election in Virginia, 1954
Party	Candidate	Votes	%	±%
Democratic	Absalom Willis Robertson (inc.)	244,844	79.88%	+14.14%
Independent Democrat	Charles W. Lewis, Jr.	32,681	10.66%	+10.66%
Social Democrat	Clarke T. Robb	28,922	9.44%	+9.02%
Write-ins		63	0.02%	+0.02%
Majority		212,163	69.22%	+34.18%
Turnout		306,510		
Democratic hold				

== See also ==
- United States Senate elections, 1954
