= 1966 United States Senate elections =

- November 8, 1966
- Class 2

35 of the 100 seats in the United States Senate 51 seats needed for a majority
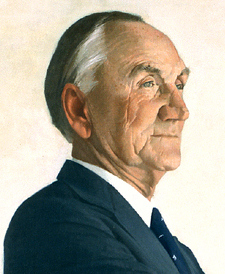

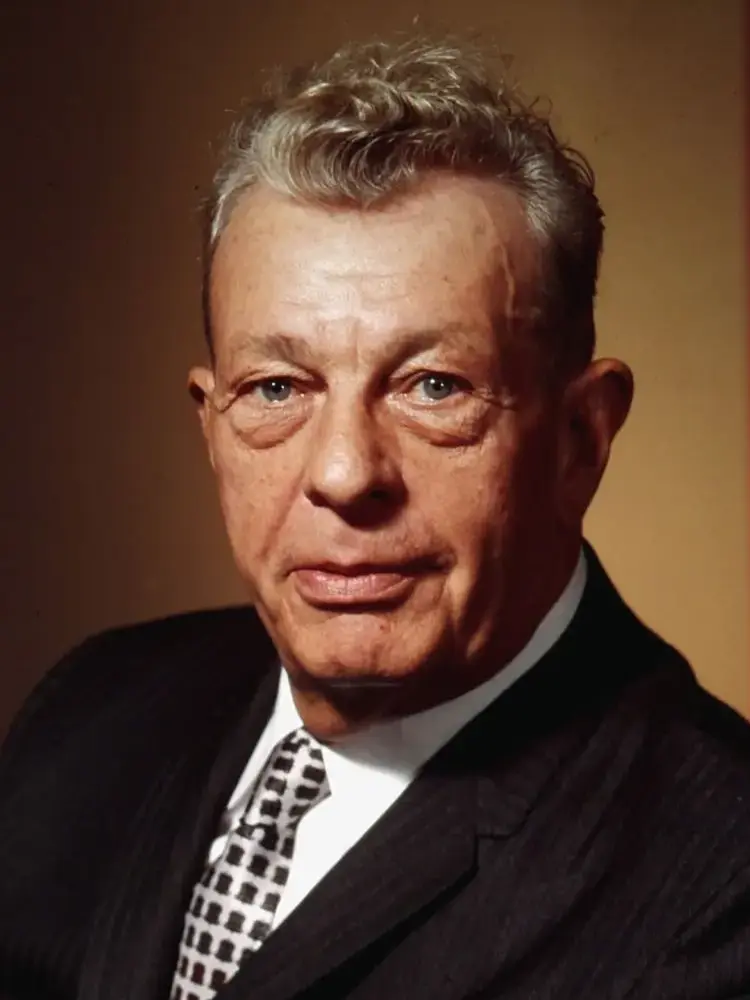
| | Majority party | Minority party |
|---|---|---|
| Leader | Mike Mansfield | Everett Dirksen |
| Party | Democratic | Republican |
| Leader since | January 3, 1961 | January 3, 1959 |
| Leader's seat | Montana | Illinois |
| Seats before | 67 | 33 |
| Seats after | 64 | 36 |
| Seat change | ▼3 | ▲3 |
| Popular vote | 12,971,141 | 13,654,168 |
| Percentage | 48.1% | 50.6% |
| Seats up | 20 | 15 |
| Races won | 17 | 18 |
- Results of the elections: Democratic hold Republican gain Republican hold No election Rectangular inset (S. C. and Va.): both seats up for election
Majority Leader before election
Mike Mansfield
Democratic
Elected Majority Leader
Mike Mansfield
Democratic

The 1966 United States Senate elections were elections on November 8, 1966, for the United States Senate which occurred midway through the second (and only full) term of President Lyndon B. Johnson. The 33 seats of Class 2 were contested in regular elections. Special elections were also held to fill vacancies. With divisions in the Democratic base over the Vietnam War, and with the traditional mid-term advantage of the party not holding the presidency, the Republicans took three Democratic seats, thereby breaking Democrats' 2/3rds supermajority. Despite Republican gains, the balance remained overwhelmingly in favor of the Democrats, who retained a 64–36 majority. Democrats were further reduced to 63–37, following the death of Robert F. Kennedy in June 1968.

These were also the first elections held after the enactment of the Voting Rights Act of 1965. Upon Edward Brooke's election in Massachusetts, he became the first African-American U.S. Senator elected after the end of Reconstruction and the first-ever popularly elected, as Reconstruction ended before the passage of the Seventeenth Amendment to the United States Constitution. As of 2024, this is the most recent Senate election cycle in which no House incumbents were elected to the Senate and the last time any state elected different parties to each Senate seat in a double-barrel election; South Carolina voters re-elected Republican Strom Thurmond in the regular election, while simultaneously electing Democrat Ernest Hollings in the special election.

== Results summary ==
↓
| 64 | 36 |
| Democratic | Republican |

| Parties | | | | Total |
| Parties | Democratic | Republican | Other | Total |
| Last elections (1964) | 68 | 32 | 0 | 100 |
| Before these elections | 67 | 33 | 0 | 100 |
| Not up | 47 | 18 | 0 | 65 |
| Up | 20 | 15 | — | 35 |
| Class 2 (1960→1966) | 18 | 15 | — | 33 |
| Special: Class 1 | 1 | 0 | — | 1 |
| Special: Class 3 | 1 | 0 | — | 1 |
| Incumbent retired | 1 | 2 | — | 3 |
| Held by same party | 0 | 2 | — | 2 |
| Replaced by other party | ▼1 Democrat replaced by ▲1 Republican | | — | 1 |
| Result | 0 | 3 | 0 | 3 |
| Incumbent ran | 19 | 13 | — | 32 |
| Won re-election | 15 | 13 | — | 28 |
| Lost re-election | ▼1 Democrat replaced by ▲1 Republican | | — | 1 |
| Lost renomination, but held by same party | 2 | 0 | — | 2 |
| Lost renomination, and party lost | ▼1 Democrat replaced by ▲1 Republican | | — | 1 |
| Result | 17 | 15 | 0 | 32 |
| Total elected | 17 | 18 | 0 | 35 |
| Net gain/loss | ▼3 | ▲3 | Steady | 3 |
| Nationwide vote | 12,358,323 | 13,169,332 | 271,245 | 25,798,900 |
| Share | 48.10% | 50.64% | 1.26% | 100% |
| Result | 64 | 36 | 0 | 100 |

Source: Clerk of the U.S. House of Representatives

== Gains, losses, and holds ==
=== Retirements ===
Two Republicans and one Democrat retired instead of seeking re-election.

| State | Senator | Replaced by |
|---|---|---|
| Massachusetts | Leverett Saltonstall | Edward Brooke |
| Oregon | Maurine Neuberger | Mark Hatfield |
| Wyoming | Milward Simpson | Clifford Hansen |

=== Defeats ===
Three Democrats sought re-election but lost in the primary or general election and one Democrat sought election to finish the unexpired term but lost in the primary election.

| State | Senator | Replaced by |
|---|---|---|
| Illinois | Paul Douglas | Charles H. Percy |
| South Carolina (special) | Donald S. Russell | Fritz Hollings |
| Tennessee | Ross Bass | Howard Baker |
| Virginia | A. Willis Robertson | William Spong Jr. |

=== Post-election changes ===
| State | Senator | Replaced by |
|---|---|---|
| New York | Robert F. Kennedy | Charles Goodell |

== Change in composition ==
=== Before the elections ===
| D_{1} | D_{2} | D_{3} | D_{4} | D_{5} | D_{6} | D_{7} | D_{8} | D_{9} | D_{10} |
| D_{20} | D_{19} | D_{18} | D_{17} | D_{16} | D_{15} | D_{14} | D_{13} | D_{12} | D_{11} |
| D_{21} | D_{22} | D_{23} | D_{24} | D_{25} | D_{26} | D_{27} | D_{28} | D_{29} | D_{30} |
| D_{40} | D_{39} | D_{38} | D_{37} | D_{36} | D_{35} | D_{34} | D_{33} | D_{32} | D_{31} |
| D_{41} | D_{42} | D_{43} | D_{44} | D_{45} | D_{46} | D_{47} | D_{48} Ala. Ran | D_{49} Alaska; Ran | D_{50} Ark. Ran |
| Majority → | | | | | | | | | D_{51} Ga. Ran |
| D_{60} Okla. Ran | D_{59} N.C. Ran | D_{58} N.M. Ran | D_{57} N.H. Ran | D_{56} Mont. Ran | D_{55} Miss. Ran | D_{54} Minn. Ran | D_{53} La. Ran | D_{52} Ill. Ran | D_{51} Ga. Ran |
| D_{61} Ore. Retired | D_{62} R.I. Ran | D_{63} S.C. (sp); Ran | D_{64} Tenn. Ran | D_{65} Va. (reg); Ran | D_{66} Va. (sp); Ran | D_{67} W.Va. Ran | R_{33} Wyo. Retired | R_{32} Texas; Ran | R_{31} S.D. Ran |
| R_{21} Idaho; Ran | R_{22} Iowa; Ran | R_{23} Kan. Ran | R_{24} Ky. Ran | R_{25} Maine; Ran | R_{26} Mass. Retired | R_{27} Mich. Ran | R_{28} Neb. Ran | R_{29} N.J. Ran | R_{30} S.C. Ran |
| R_{20} Del. Ran | R_{19} Colo. Ran | R_{18} | R_{17} | R_{16} | R_{15} | R_{14} | R_{13} | R_{12} | R_{11} |
| R_{1} | R_{2} | R_{3} | R_{4} | R_{5} | R_{6} | R_{7} | R_{8} | R_{9} | R_{10} |

=== After the elections ===
| D_{1} | D_{2} | D_{3} | D_{4} | D_{5} | D_{6} | D_{7} | D_{8} | D_{9} | D_{10} |
| D_{20} | D_{19} | D_{18} | D_{17} | D_{16} | D_{15} | D_{14} | D_{13} | D_{12} | D_{11} |
| D_{21} | D_{22} | D_{23} | D_{24} | D_{25} | D_{26} | D_{27} | D_{28} | D_{29} | D_{30} |
| D_{40} | D_{39} | D_{38} | D_{37} | D_{36} | D_{35} | D_{34} | D_{33} | D_{32} | D_{31} |
| D_{41} | D_{42} | D_{43} | D_{44} | D_{45} | D_{46} | D_{47} | D_{48} Ala. Re-elected | D_{49} Alaska; Re-elected | D_{50} Ark. Re-elected |
| Majority → | | | | | | | | | D_{51} Ga. Re-elected |
| D_{60} R.I. Re-elected | D_{59} Okla. Re-elected | D_{58} N.C. Re-elected | D_{57} N.M. Re-elected | D_{56} N.H. Re-elected | D_{55} Mont. Re-elected | D_{54} Miss. Re-elected | D_{53} Minn. Elected (Note: Appointee elected) | D_{52} La. Re-elected | D_{51} Ga. Re-elected |
| D_{61} S.C. (sp); Hold | D_{62} Va. (reg); Hold | D_{63} Va. (sp); Elected | D_{64} W.Va. Re-elected | R_{36} Tenn. Gain | R_{35} Ore. Gain | R_{34} Ill. Gain | R_{33} Wyo. Hold | R_{32} Texas; Re-elected | R_{31} S.D. Re-elected |
| R_{21} Idaho; Re-elected | R_{22} Iowa; Re-elected | R_{23} Kan. Re-elected | R_{24} Ky. Re-elected | R_{25} Maine; Re-elected | R_{26} Mass. Hold | R_{27} Mich. Elected | R_{28} Neb. Re-elected | R_{29} N.J. Re-elected | R_{30} S.C. (reg); Re-elected |
| R_{20} Del. Re-elected | R_{19} Colo. Re-elected | R_{18} | R_{17} | R_{16} | R_{15} | R_{14} | R_{13} | R_{12} | R_{11} |
| R_{1} | R_{2} | R_{3} | R_{4} | R_{5} | R_{6} | R_{7} | R_{8} | R_{9} | R_{10} |

| Key | D_{#} / Democratic; R_{#} / Republican |

== Race summaries ==
=== Special elections during the 89th Congress ===
In these special elections, the winner was seated during 1966 or before January 3, 1967; ordered by election date, then state.

| State | Incumbent | | | Results | Candidates |
| State | Senator | Party | Electoral history | Results | Candidates |
|---|---|---|---|---|---|
| South Carolina (Class 3) | Donald S. Russell | Democratic | 1965 (Appointed) | Interim appointee lost nomination. Democratic hold. | ▌ ✓ Fritz Hollings (Democratic) 51.4%; ▌Marshall Parker (Republican) 48.7% |
| Virginia (Class 1) | Harry F. Byrd Jr. | Democratic | 1965 (Appointed) | Interim appointee elected. | ▌ ✓ Harry F. Byrd Jr. (Democratic) 53.3%; ▌Lawrence M. Traylor (Republican) 37.4%; ▌John W. Carter (Independent) 7.9% |

=== Elections leading to the next Congress ===
In these general elections, the winners were elected for the term beginning January 3, 1967; ordered by state.

All of the elections involved the Class 2 seats.

| State | Incumbent | | | Results | Candidates |
| State | Senator | Party | Electoral history | Results | Candidates |
|---|---|---|---|---|---|
| Alabama | John Sparkman | Democratic | 1946 (special); 1948; 1954; 1960 | Incumbent re-elected. | ▌ ✓ John Sparkman (Democratic) 60.1%; ▌John Grenier (Republican) 39.0% |
| Alaska | Bob Bartlett | Democratic | 1958 (New seat); 1960 | Incumbent re-elected. | ▌ ✓ Bob Bartlett (Democratic) 75.5%; ▌Lee McKinley (Republican) 24.5% |
| Arkansas | John L. McClellan | Democratic | 1942; 1948; 1954; 1960 | Incumbent re-elected. | ▌ ✓ John L. McClellan (Democratic); Unopposed |
| Colorado | Gordon Allott | Republican | 1954; 1960 | Incumbent re-elected. | ▌ ✓ Gordon Allott (Republican) 58.0%; ▌Roy Romer (Democratic) 41.9% |
| Delaware | J. Caleb Boggs | Republican | 1960 | Incumbent re-elected. | ▌ ✓ J. Caleb Boggs (Republican) 59.1%; ▌James M. Tunnell Jr. (Democratic) 40.9% |
| Georgia | Richard Russell Jr. | Democratic | 1932 (special); 1936; 1942; 1948; 1954; 1960 | Incumbent re-elected. | ▌ ✓ Richard Russell Jr. (Democratic); Unopposed |
| Idaho | Len Jordan | Republican | 1962 (Appointed); 1962 (special) | Incumbent re-elected. | ▌ ✓ Len Jordan (Republican) 55.4%; ▌Ralph R. Harding (Democratic) 44.6% |
| Illinois | Paul Douglas | Democratic | 1948; 1954; 1960 | Incumbent lost re-election. Republican gain. | ▌ ✓ Charles H. Percy (Republican) 55.0%; ▌Paul Douglas (Democratic) 43.9% |
| Iowa | Jack Miller | Republican | 1960 | Incumbent re-elected. | ▌ ✓ Jack Miller (Republican) 60.9%; ▌Elbert B. Smith (Democratic) 37.8% |
| Kansas | James B. Pearson | Republican | 1962 (Appointed); 1962 (special) | Incumbent re-elected. | ▌ ✓ James B. Pearson (Republican) 52.2%; ▌James Floyd Breeding (Democratic) 45.2% |
| Kentucky | John Sherman Cooper | Republican | 1946 (special); 1948 (Lost); 1952 (special); 1954 (Lost); 1956 (special); 1960 | Incumbent re-elected. | ▌ ✓ John Sherman Cooper (Republican) 64.5%; ▌John Y. Brown Sr. (Democratic) 35.5% |
| Louisiana | Allen J. Ellender | Democratic | 1936; 1942; 1948; 1954; 1960 | Incumbent re-elected. | ▌ ✓ Allen J. Ellender (Democratic); Unopposed |
| Maine | Margaret Chase Smith | Republican | 1948; 1954; 1960 | Incumbent re-elected. | ▌ ✓ Margaret Chase Smith (Republican) 59.0%; ▌Elmer H. Violette (Democratic) 41.1% |
| Massachusetts | Leverett Saltonstall | Republican | 1944 (special); 1948; 1954; 1960 | Incumbent retired. Republican hold. | ▌ ✓ Edward Brooke (Republican) 60.7%; ▌Endicott Peabody (Democratic) 38.7% |
| Michigan | Robert P. Griffin | Republican | 1966 (Appointed) | Interim appointee elected. | ▌ ✓ Robert P. Griffin (Republican) 55.9%; ▌G. Mennen Williams (Democratic) 43.8% |
| Minnesota | Walter Mondale | DFL | 1964 (Appointed) | Interim appointee elected. | ▌ ✓ Walter Mondale (DFL) 53.9%; ▌Robert A. Forsythe (Republican) 45.2% |
| Mississippi | James Eastland | Democratic | 1942; 1948; 1954; 1960 | Incumbent re-elected. | ▌ ✓ James Eastland (Democratic) 65.5%; ▌Prentiss Walker (Republican) 26.8%; ▌Clifton R. Whitley (Independent) 7.8% |
| Montana | Lee Metcalf | Democratic | 1960 | Incumbent re-elected. | ▌ ✓ Lee Metcalf (Democratic) 53.2%; ▌Tim Babcock (Republican) 46.8% |
| Nebraska | Carl Curtis | Republican | 1954; 1960 | Incumbent re-elected. | ▌ ✓ Carl Curtis (Republican) 61.2%; ▌Frank B. Morrison (Democratic) 38.8% |
| New Hampshire | Thomas J. McIntyre | Democratic | 1962 (special) | Incumbent re-elected. | ▌ ✓ Thomas J. McIntyre (Democratic) 54.0%; ▌Harrison Thyng (Republican) 45.9% |
| New Jersey | Clifford P. Case | Republican | 1954; 1960 | Incumbent re-elected. | ▌ ✓ Clifford P. Case (Republican) 60.0%; ▌Warren W. Wilentz (Democratic) 37.0% |
| New Mexico | Clinton Anderson | Democratic | 1948; 1954; 1960 | Incumbent re-elected. | ▌ ✓ Clinton Anderson (Democratic) 53.1%; ▌Anderson Carter (Republican) 46.9% |
| North Carolina | B. Everett Jordan | Democratic | 1958 (Appointed); 1958 (special); 1960 | Incumbent re-elected. | ▌ ✓ B. Everett Jordan (Democratic) 55.6%; ▌John S. Shallcross (Republican) 44.4% |
| Oklahoma | Fred R. Harris | Democratic | 1964 (special) | Incumbent re-elected. | ▌ ✓ Fred R. Harris (Democratic) 53.7%; ▌Pat J. Patterson (Republican) 46.3% |
| Oregon | Maurine Neuberger | Democratic | 1960 (special); 1960 | Incumbent retired. Republican gain. Winner delayed start of term until January 10, 1967, in order to finish his term as Governor of Oregon. | ▌ ✓ Mark Hatfield (Republican) 51.7%; ▌Robert B. Duncan (Democratic) 48.2% |
| Rhode Island | Claiborne Pell | Democratic | 1960 | Incumbent re-elected. | ▌ ✓ Claiborne Pell (Democratic) 67.7%; ▌Ruth M. Briggs (Republican) 32.3% |
| South Carolina | Strom Thurmond | Republican | 1954 (write-in) (Note: Senator Strom Thurmond was originally elected as a Democrat in 1954, but as a write-in candidate, a special election in 1956 and 1960 before switching to a Republican in 1964.); 1954 (Appointed); 1956 (Resigned); 1956 (special); 1960 | Incumbent re-elected. | ▌ ✓ Strom Thurmond (Republican) 62.2%; ▌Bradley Morrah (Democratic) 37.8% |
| South Dakota | Karl Mundt | Republican | 1948; 1948 (Appointed); 1954; 1960 | Incumbent re-elected. | ▌ ✓ Karl Mundt (Republican) 66.3%; ▌Donn H. Wright (Democratic) 33.7% |
| Tennessee | Ross Bass | Democratic | 1964 (special) | Incumbent lost renomination. Republican gain. | ▌ ✓ Howard Baker (Republican) 55.7%; ▌Frank G. Clement (Democratic) 44.3% |
| Texas | John Tower | Republican | 1961 (special) | Incumbent re-elected. | ▌ ✓ John Tower (Republican) 56.4%; ▌Waggoner Carr (Democratic) 43.1% |
| Virginia | A. Willis Robertson | Democratic | 1946 (Appointed); 1948; 1954; 1960 | Incumbent lost renomination. Democratic hold. Incumbent resigned December 30, 1966 to give successor preferential seniority. Winner seated December 31, 1966. | ▌ ✓ William Spong Jr. (Democratic) 58.6%; ▌James P. Ould Jr. (Republican) 33.5%; ▌F. Lee Hawthorne (Conservative) 7.9% |
| West Virginia | Jennings Randolph | Democratic | 1958 (special); 1960 | Incumbent re-elected. | ▌ ✓ Jennings Randolph (Democratic) 59.5%; ▌Francis J. Love (Republican) 40.5% |
| Wyoming | Milward Simpson | Republican | 1962 (special) | Incumbent retired. Republican hold. | ▌ ✓ Clifford Hansen (Republican) 51.8%; ▌Teno Roncalio (Democratic) 48.2% |

== Closest races ==
Nine races had a margin of victory under 10%:

| State | Party of winner | Margin |
|---|---|---|
| South Carolina (special) | Democratic | 2.7% |
| Oregon | Republican (flip) | 3.5% |
| Wyoming | Republican | 3.6% |
| New Mexico | Democratic | 6.2% |
| Montana | Democratic | 6.4% |
| Kansas | Republican | 7.0% |
| Oklahoma | Democratic | 7.4% |
| New Hampshire | Democratic | 8.1% |
| Minnesota | Democratic/DFL | 8.7% |

There is no tipping point state, as the Arkansas, Georgia, and Louisiana races were all unopposed.

== Alabama ==
1966 United States Senate election in Alabama
- November 8, 1966
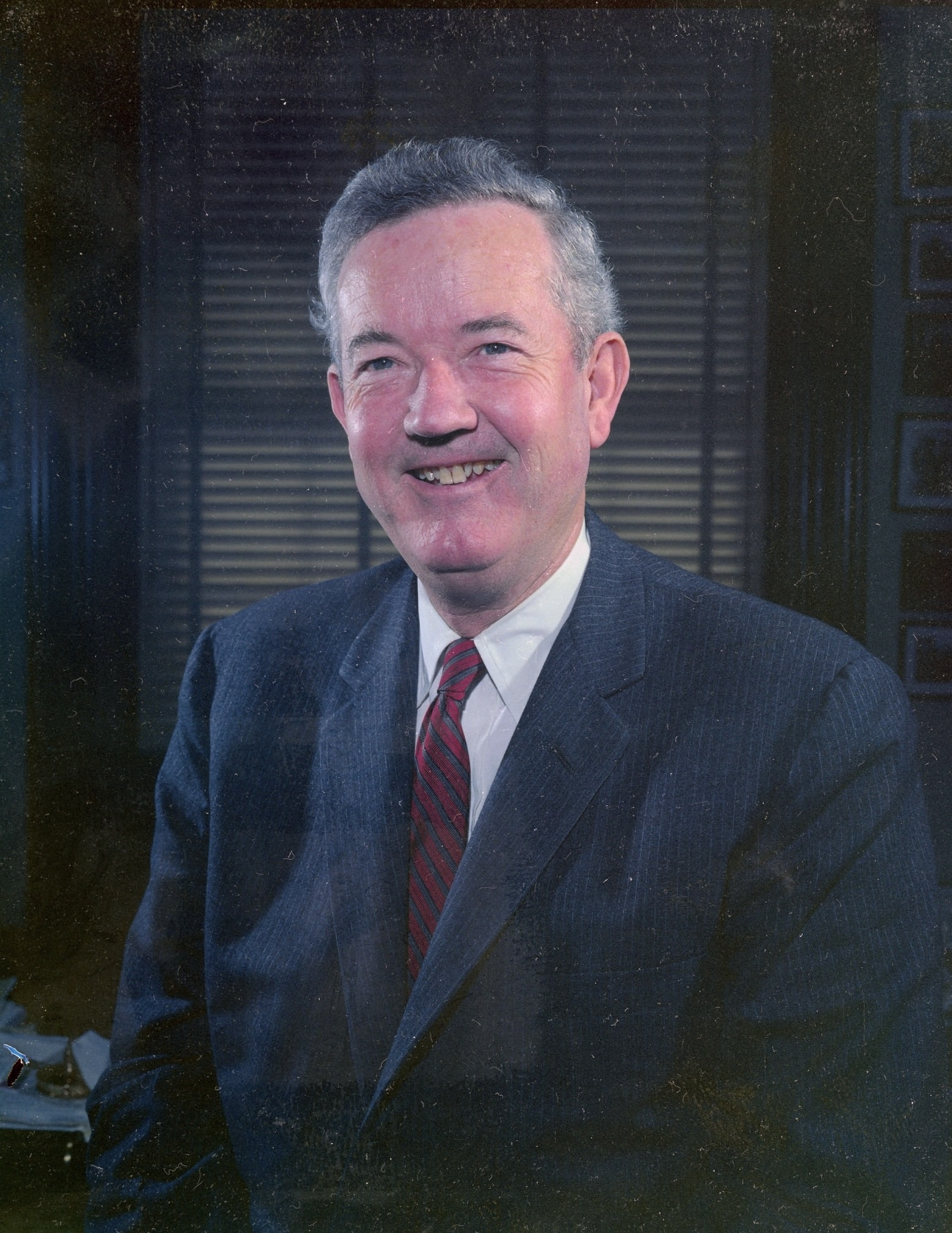

| Nominee | John Sparkman | John Grenier |
| Party | Democratic | Republican |
| Popular vote | 482,138 | 313,018 |
| Percentage | 60.07% | 39.00% |
- County results Sparkman: 50–60% 60–70% 70–80% Grenier: 60-70%
U.S. senator before election
John Sparkman
Democratic
Elected U.S. Senator
John Sparkman
Democratic

Incumbent Democrat John Sparkman was easily reelected to a fourth full term. Republican challenger John Grenier received 39% of the vote, the best result that a challenger to Sparkman had ever received to that date, presaging the rise of the Republican party in Alabama after decades of Democratic dominance.

1966 United States Senate election in Alabama
| Party | Candidate | Votes | % |
|---|---|---|---|
| Democratic | John J. Sparkman (Incumbent) | 482,138 | 60.07 |
| Republican | John Grenier | 313,018 | 39.00 |
| Independent | Julian E. Elgin | 7,444 | 0.93 |
| None | Scattering | 8 | 0.00 |
| Majority | | 169,120 | 21.07 |
| Turnout | | 802,608 | |
| Democratic hold | | | |

== Alaska ==
1966 United States Senate election in Alaska
- November 8, 1966
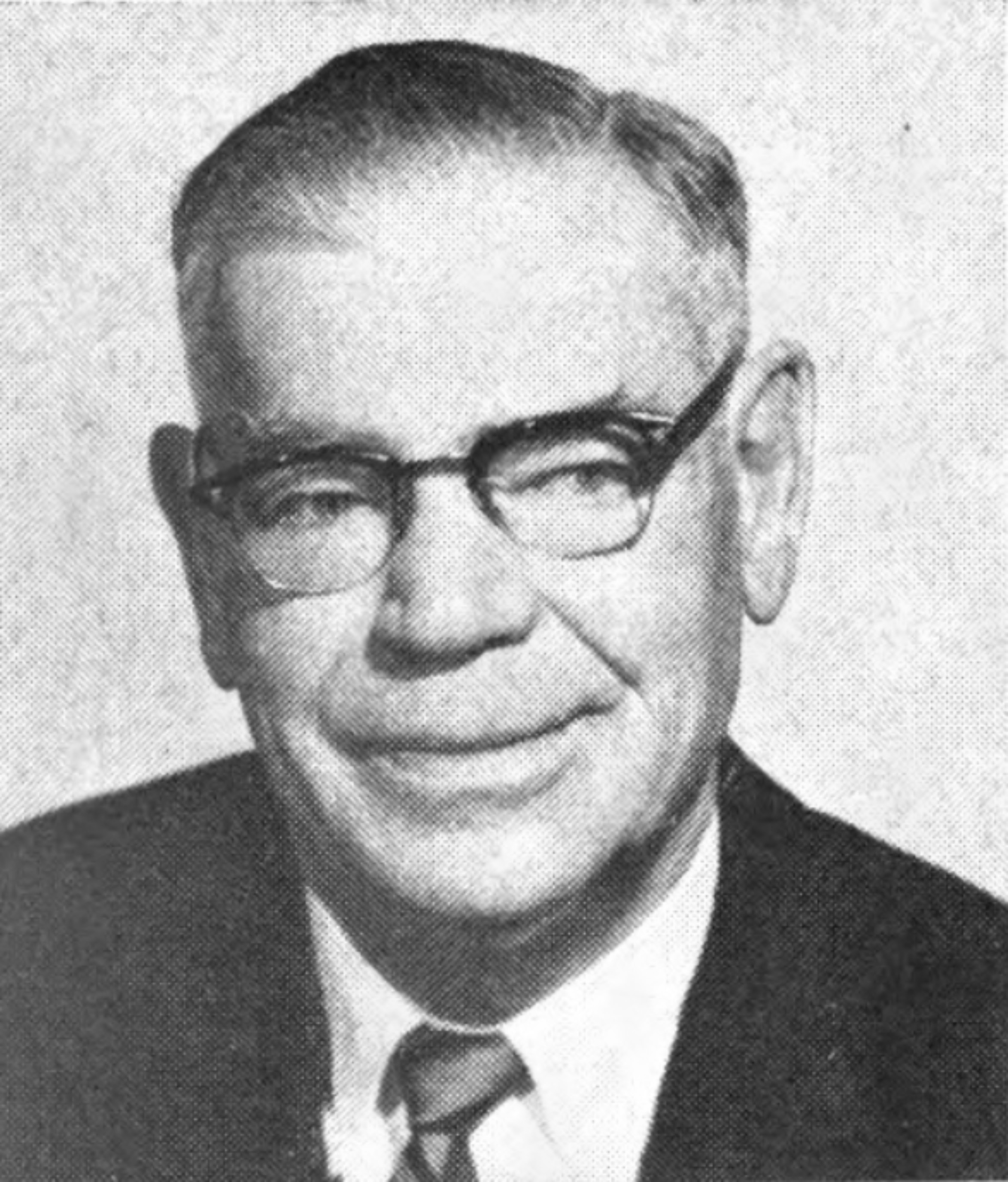

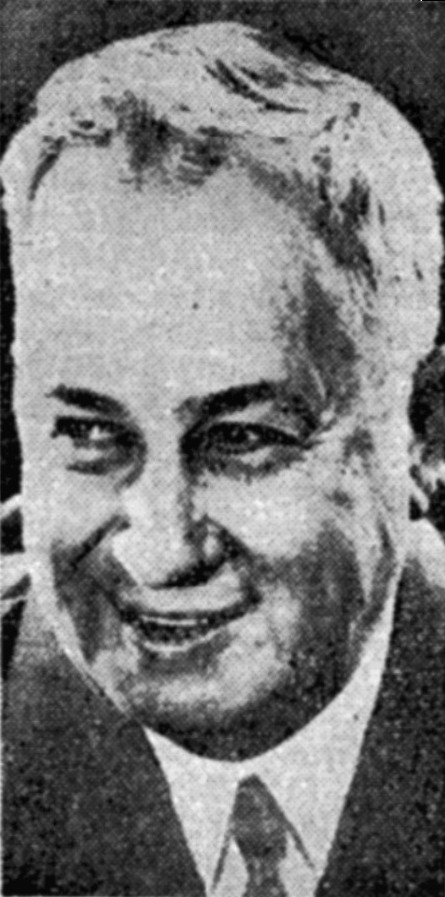
| Nominee | Bob Bartlett | Lee McKinley |
| Party | Democratic | Republican |
| Popular vote | 49,289 | 15,961 |
| Percentage | 75.54% | 24.46% |
- Results by state house district Bartlett: 60–70% 70–80% 80–90%
U.S. senator before election
Bob Bartlett
Democratic
Elected U.S. Senator
Bob Bartlett
Democratic

Incumbent Democrat Bob Bartlett was reelected to his third (a second full) term in a landslide, defeating Republican candidate Lee McKinley in a rematch of the 1960 election.

1966 United States Senate election in Alaska
| Party | Candidate | Votes | % |
|---|---|---|---|
| Democratic | Bob Bartlett (Incumbent) | 49,289 | 75.54 |
| Republican | Lee L. McKinley | 15,961 | 24.46 |
| Majority | | 33,328 | 51.08 |
| Turnout | | 65,250 | |
| Democratic hold | | | |

== Arkansas ==
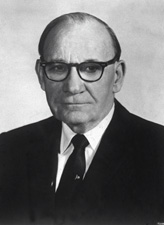
Senator John L. McClellan

Incumbent Democrat John L. McClellan was reelected unopposed to a fifth term in office.

1966 United States Senate election in Arkansas
| Party | Candidate | Votes | % |
|---|---|---|---|
| Democratic | John L. McClellan (Incumbent) | Unopposed | 100 |
| Democratic hold | | | |

== Colorado ==
1966 United States Senate election in Colorado
- November 8, 1966
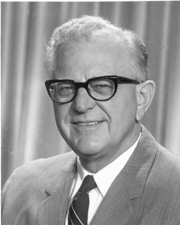

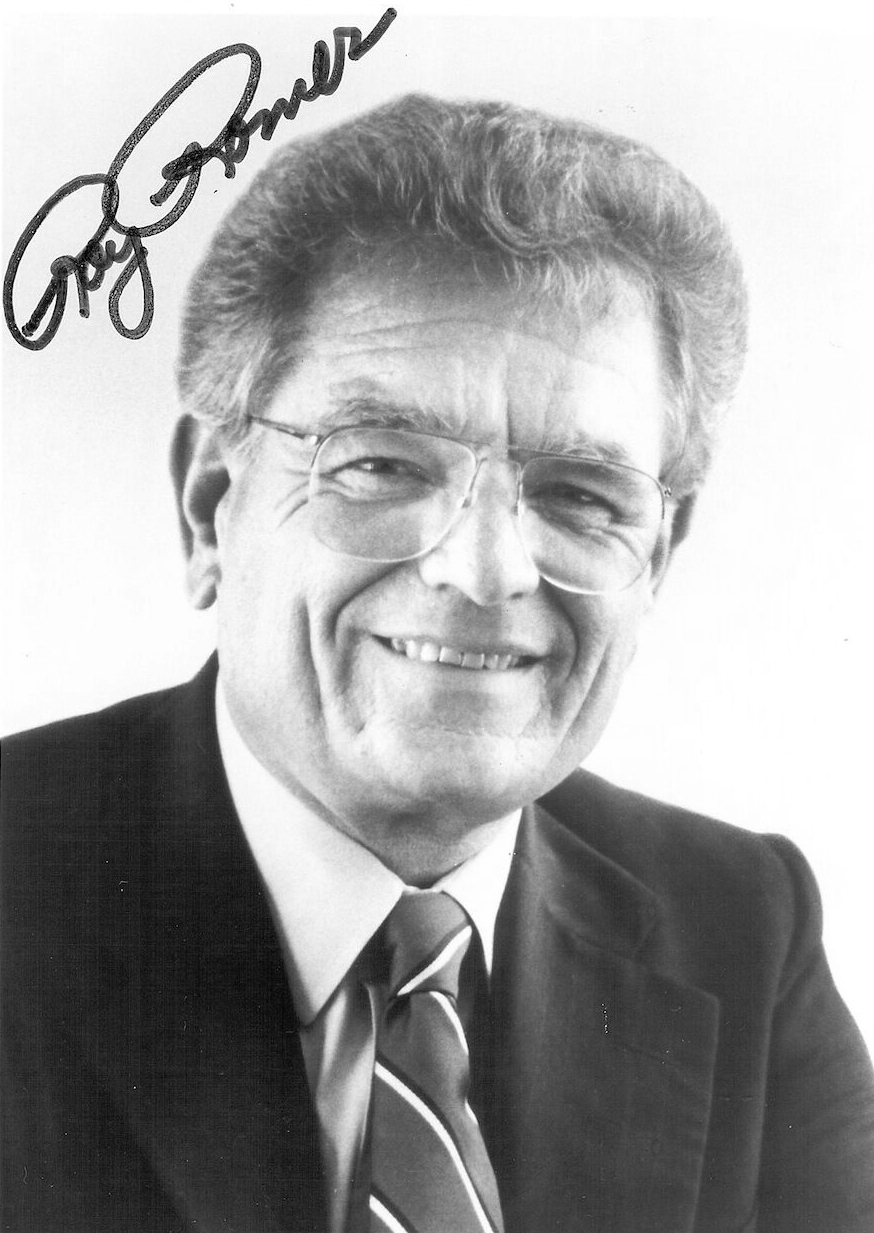
| Nominee | Gordon Allott | Roy Romer |
| Party | Republican | Democratic |
| Popular vote | 368,307 | 266,198 |
| Percentage | 58.02% | 41.93% |
- County results Allott: 50–60% 60–70% 70–80% Romer: 50–60% 60–70%
U.S. senator before election
Gordon Allott
Republican
Elected U.S. senator
Gordon Allott
Republican

Republican incumbent Gordon Allott was reelected to a third term, defeating Democratic state senator and future governor Roy Romer.

1966 United States Senate election in Colorado
| Party | Candidate | Votes | % |
|---|---|---|---|
| Republican | Gordon L. Allott (Incumbent) | 368,307 | 58.02 |
| Democratic | Roy Romer | 266,198 | 41.93 |
| Write-In | Walter Cranson | 332 | 0.05 |
| Majority | | 102,109 | 16.09 |
| Turnout | | 634,837 | |
| Republican hold | | | |

== Delaware ==
Delaware election
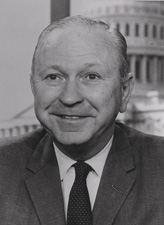

| Nominee | J. Caleb Boggs | James M. Tunnell Jr. |
| Party | Republican | Democratic |
| Popular vote | 97,268 | 67,263 |
| Percentage | 59.12% | 40.88% |
- County Results; Boggs: 50-60% 60-70%
U.S. senator before election
J. Caleb Boggs
Republican
Elected U.S. Senator
J. Caleb Boggs
Republican

Republican incumbent J. Caleb Boggs won reelection to a second term over Democratic candidate James M. Tunnell Jr., whose father had served in the Senate in the 1940s.

1966 United States Senate election in Delaware
| Party | Candidate | Votes | % |
|---|---|---|---|
| Republican | J. Caleb Boggs (Incumbent) | 97,268 | 59.12 |
| Democratic | James M. Tunnell Jr. | 67,263 | 40.88 |
| Majority | | 30,005 | 18.24 |
| Turnout | | 164,531 | |
| Republican hold | | | |

== Georgia ==
1966 Democratic Senate primary election in Georgia
- September 14, 1966
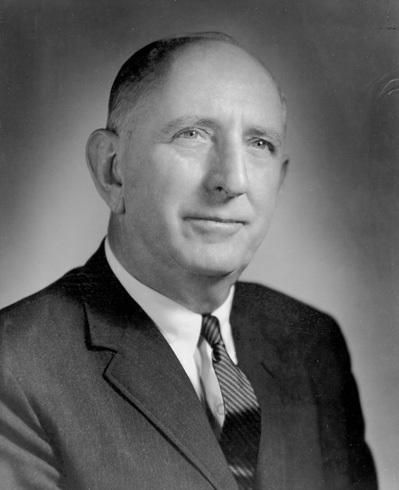

| Nominee | Richard Russell Jr. | Harry Hyde |
| Party | Democratic | Democratic |
| Popular vote | 596,209 | 61,922 |
| Percentage | 90.59% | 9.41% |
- County results Russell: 60–70% 70–80% 80–90% >90%
U.S. senator before election
Richard Russell Jr.
Democratic
Elected U.S. Senator
Richard Russell Jr.
Democratic

Democratic incumbent Richard Russell Jr. was reelected unopposed to a sixth full term (and seventh overall.)

1966 United States Senate election in Georgia
| Party | Candidate | Votes | % |
|---|---|---|---|
| Democratic | Richard Russell Jr. (Incumbent) | 631,002 | 99.95 |
| None | Scattering | 328 | 0.05 |
| Majority | | 630,674 | 99.90 |
| Turnout | | 631,330 | |
| Democratic hold | | | |

== Idaho ==
Idaho election
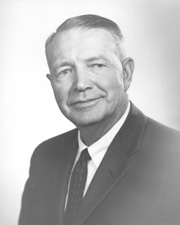

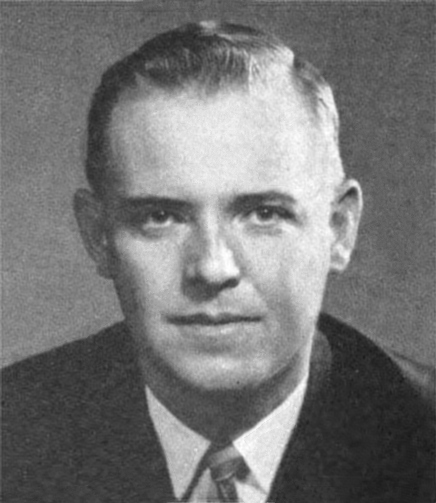
| Nominee | Len Jordan | Ralph Harding |
| Party | Republican | Democratic |
| Popular vote | 139,819 | 112,637 |
| Percentage | 55.38% | 44.62% |
- County Results; Jordan: 50–60% 60–70% Harding: 50–60% 60–70% 70–80%
U.S. senator before election
Len Jordan
Republican
Elected U.S. Senator
Len Jordan
Republican

Republican incumbent Len Jordan won reelection a full term, having previously served out the unexpired term of the late Henry Dworshak. He defeated Democratic Congressman Ralph R. Harding.

1966 United States Senate election in Idaho
| Party | Candidate | Votes | % |
|---|---|---|---|
| Republican | Len Jordan (Incumbent) | 139,819 | 55.38 |
| Democratic | Ralph R. Harding | 112,637 | 44.62 |
| Majority | | 27,182 | 10.76 |
| Turnout | | 252,456 | |
| Republican hold | | | |

== Illinois ==
1966 United States Senate election in Illinois
- November 8, 1966
- Turnout: 71.56%
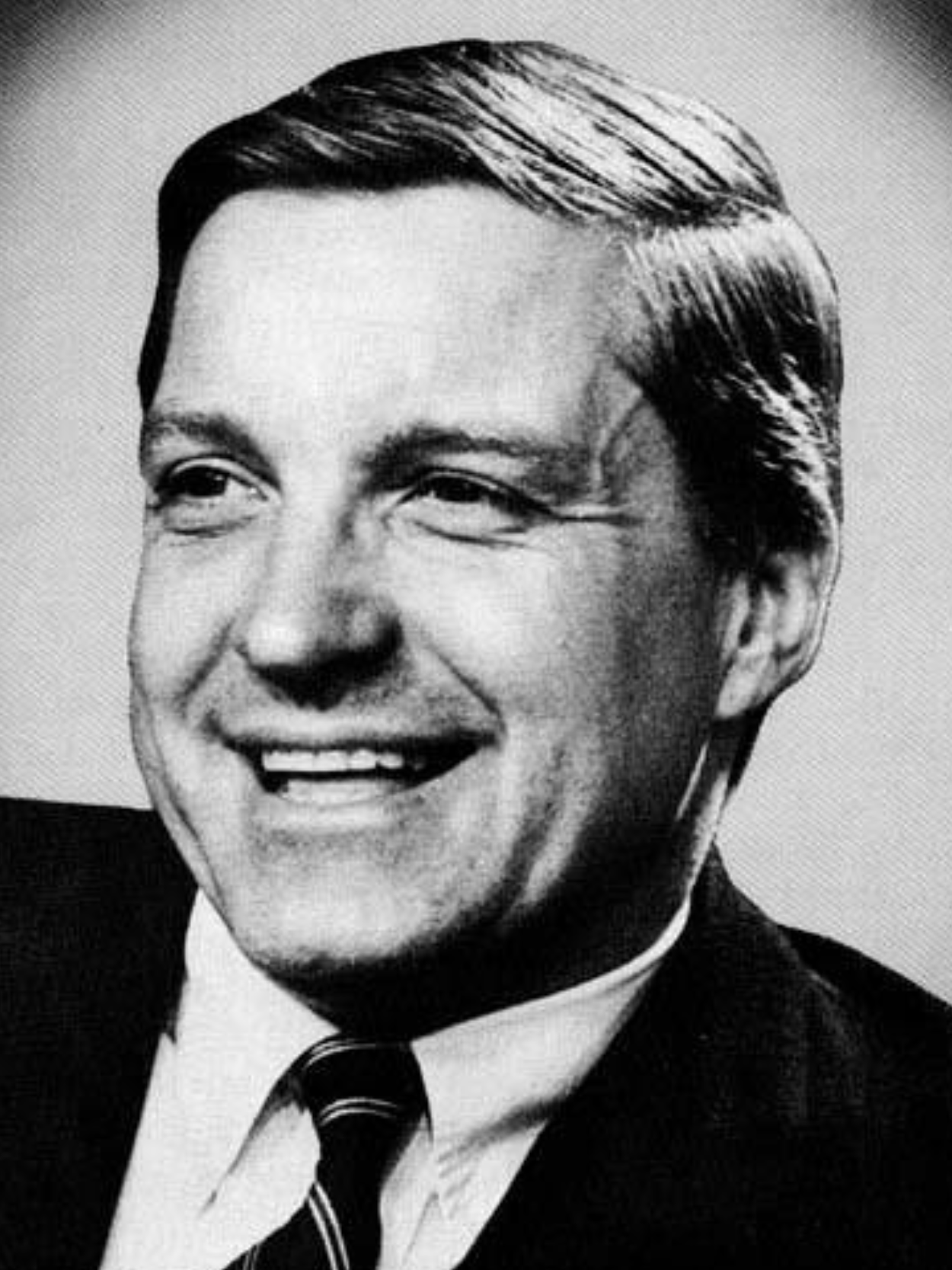

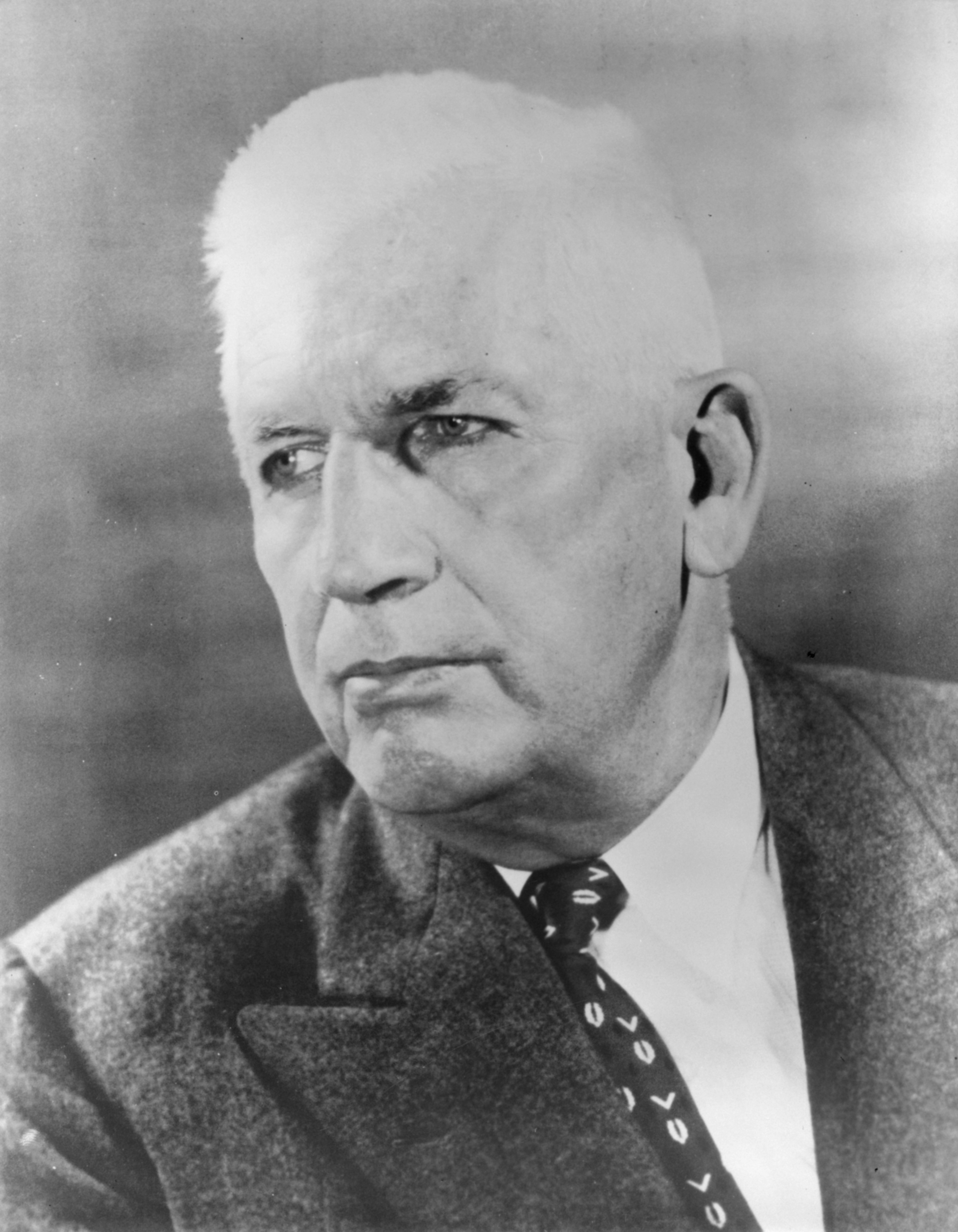
| Nominee | Charles Percy | Paul Douglas |
| Party | Republican | Democratic |
| Popular vote | 2,100,449 | 1,678,147 |
| Percentage | 54.95% | 43.90% |
- County results Percy: 50-60% 60-70% 70-80% Douglas: 50–60%
U.S. senator before election
Paul Douglas
Democratic
Elected U.S. Senator
Charles H. Percy
Republican

Incumbent Democrat Paul Douglas, seeking a fourth term in the United States Senate, faced off against Republican Charles H. Percy, a businessman and the 1964 Republican nominee for Governor of Illinois. Also running was Robert Sabonjian (I), Mayor of Waukegan. A competitive election ensued, featuring campaign appearances by former Vice-President Richard M. Nixon on behalf of Percy. Ultimately, Percy ended up defeating Senator Douglas by a fairly wide margin, allowing him to win what would be the first of three terms in the Senate.

1966 United States Senate election in Illinois
| Party | Candidate | Votes | % | ±% |
|---|---|---|---|---|
| Republican | Charles H. Percy | 2,100,449 | 54.95 | +9.75% |
| Democratic | Paul H. Douglas (Incumbent) | 1,678,147 | 43.90 | −10.73% |
| Independent | Robert Sabonjian | 41,965 | 1.10 | |
| Write-ins | | 2,163 | 0.05 | |
| Majority | | 422,302 | 11.05 | +1.61% |
| Turnout | | 3,822,724 | | |
| Republican gain from Democratic | | Swing | | |

== Iowa ==
1966 United States Senate election in Iowa
- November 8, 1966
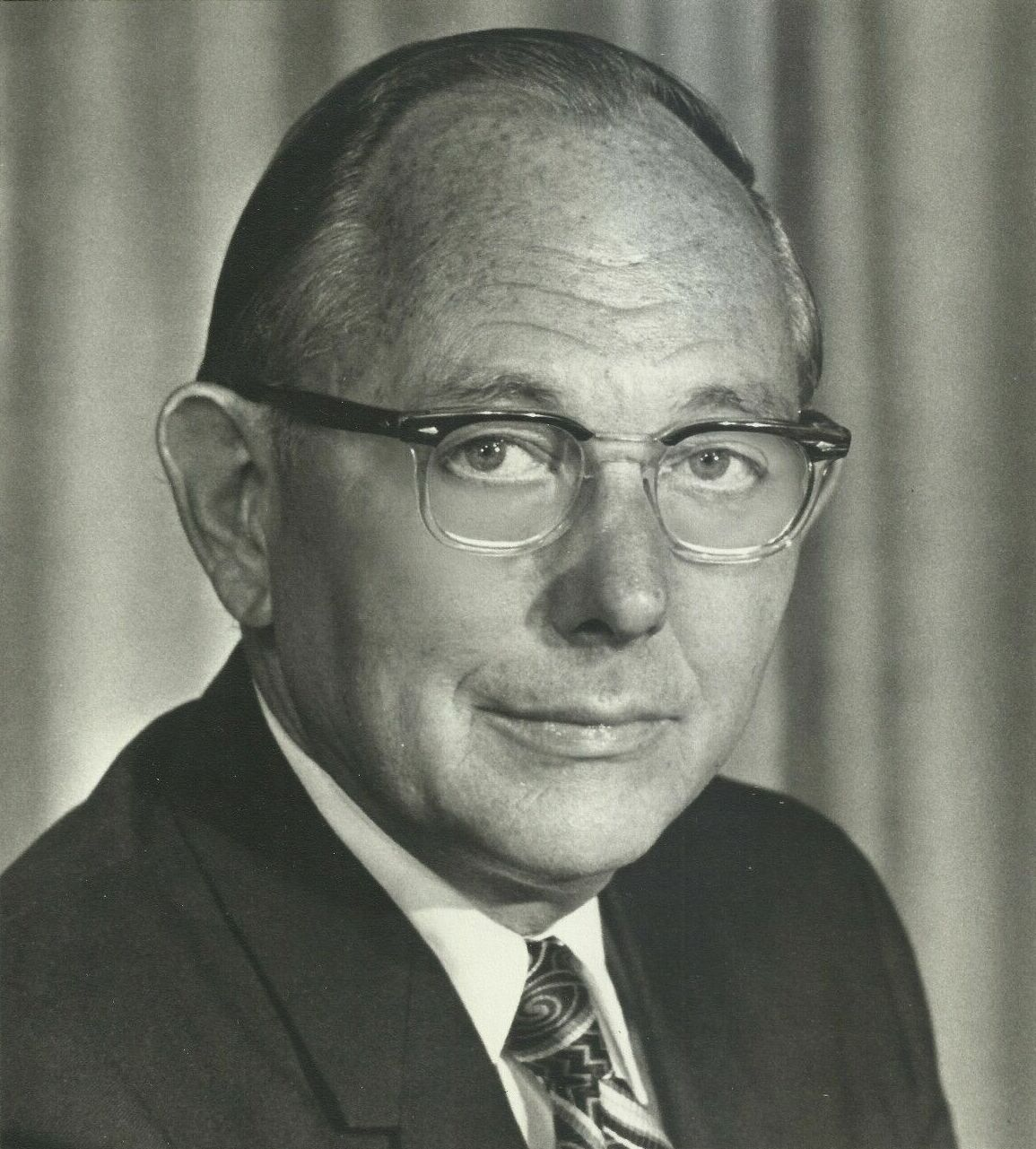

| Nominee | Jack Miller | E.B. Smith |
| Party | Republican | Democratic |
| Popular vote | 522,339 | 324,114 |
| Percentage | 60.92% | 37.80% |
- County results Miller: 50-60% 60-70% 70-80% 80-90%
U.S. senator before election
Jack Miller
Republican
Elected U.S. Senator
Jack Miller
Republican

Republican incumbent Jack Miller was reelected to a second term, defeating Democrat Elbert B. Smith, who had previously run for the state's other Senate seat in 1962.

1966 United States Senate election in Iowa
| Party | Candidate | Votes | % |
|---|---|---|---|
| Republican | Jack Miller (Incumbent) | 522,339 | 60.91 |
| Democratic | E. B. Smith | 324,114 | 37.80 |
| Constitution | Robert D. Dilley | 3,826 | 0.45 |
| Peace Independent | Charles H. Day | 3,050 | 0.36 |
| Iowa | Herbert F. Hoover | 2,085 | 0.24 |
| Prohibition | Verne Higens | 2,081 | 0.24 |
| None | Scattering | 1 | 0.00 |
| Majority | | 198,225 | 23.11 |
| Turnout | | 857,496 | |
| Republican hold | | | |

== Kansas ==
1966 United States Senate election in Kansas
- November 8, 1966
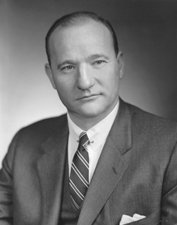

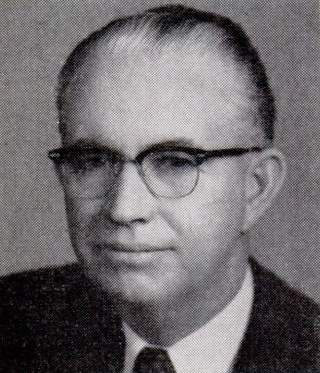
| Nominee | James B. Pearson | James Floyd Breeding |
| Party | Republican | Democratic |
| Popular vote | 350,077 | 303,223 |
| Percentage | 52.15% | 45.17% |
- County results Pearson: 40–50% 50–60% 60–70% Breeding: 40–50% 50–60%
U.S. senator before election
James B. Pearson
Republican
Elected U.S. senator
James B. Pearson
Republican

Incumbent Republican James B. Pearson won reelection to a full term, having previously served out the unexpired term of Andrew Frank Schoeppel following Schoeppel's death. He defeated Democratic Congressman James Floyd Breeding.

1966 United States Senate election in Kansas
| Party | Candidate | Votes | % |
|---|---|---|---|
| Republican | James B. Pearson (Incumbent) | 350,077 | 52.15 |
| Democratic | James Floyd Breeding | 303,223 | 45.17 |
| Prohibition | Earl F. Dodge | 9,364 | 1.39 |
| Conservative | George W. Snell | 7,103 | 1.06 |
| None | Scattering | 1,578 | 0.24 |
| Majority | | 46,854 | 6.98 |
| Turnout | | 671,345 | |
| Republican hold | | | |

== Kentucky ==
1966 United States Senate election in Kentucky
- November 8, 1966
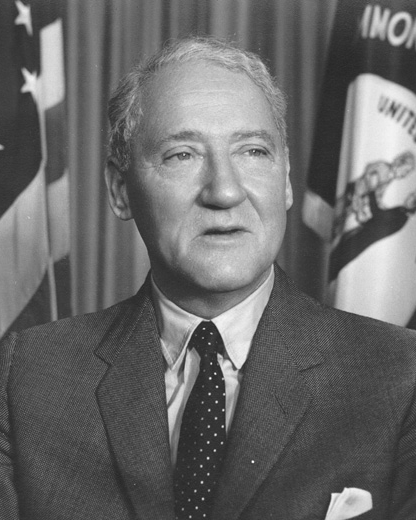

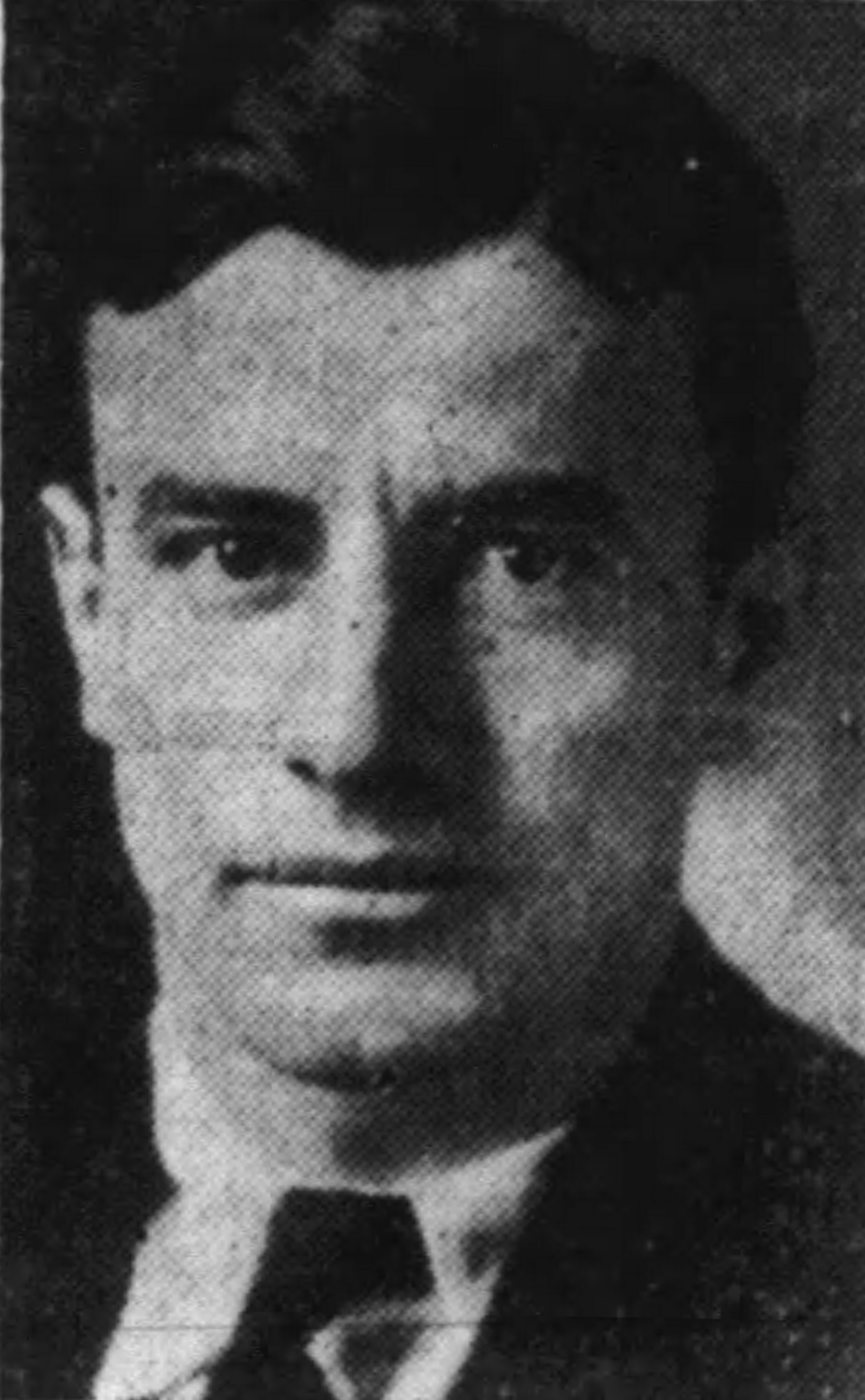
| Nominee | John Sherman Cooper | John Y. Brown Sr. |
| Party | Republican | Democratic |
| Popular vote | 483,805 | 266,079 |
| Percentage | 64.52% | 35.48% |
- County results Cooper: 50-60% 60-70% 70-80% 80–90% Brown: 50–60% 60–70%
U.S. senator before election
John Sherman Cooper
Republican
Elected U.S. Senator
John Sherman Cooper
Republican

Republican incumbent John Sherman Cooper won reelection over Democrat John Y. Brown Sr., an attorney and former Congressman.

1966 United States Senate election in Kentucky
| Party | Candidate | Votes | % |
|---|---|---|---|
| Republican | John Sherman Cooper (Incumbent) | 483,805 | 64.52 |
| Democratic | John Young Brown Sr. | 266,079 | 35.48 |
| Majority | | 217,726 | 29.04 |
| Turnout | | 749,884 | |
| Republican hold | | | |

== Louisiana ==
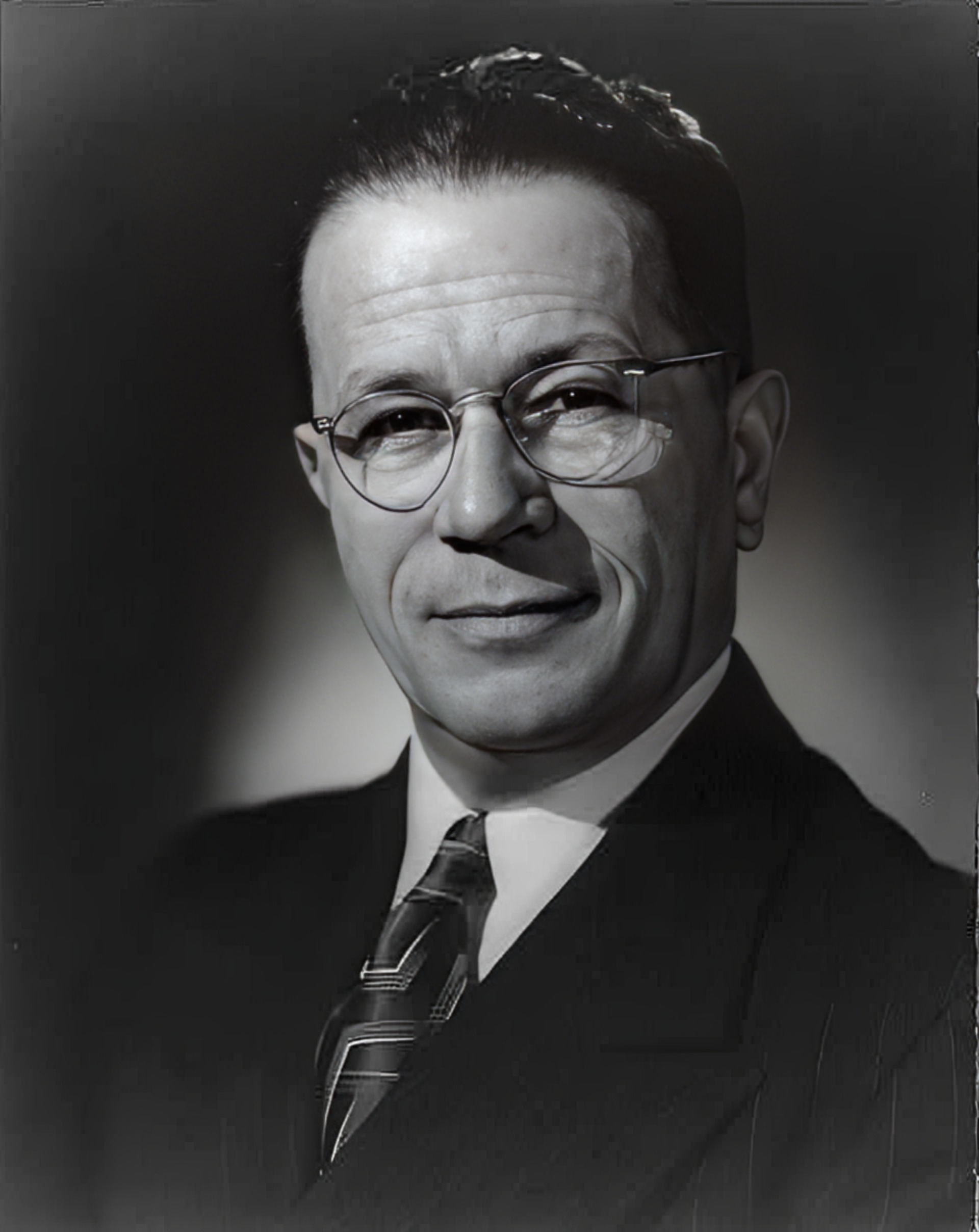
Senator Allen J. Ellender

Incumbent Democrat Allen J. Ellender was elected unopposed to a sixth term.

1966 United States Senate election in Louisiana
| Party | Candidate | Votes | % |
|---|---|---|---|
| Democratic | Allen J. Ellender (Incumbent) | 437,695 | 100.00 |
| Democratic hold | | | |

== Maine ==
1966 United States Senate election in Maine
- November 8, 1966
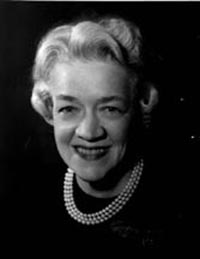

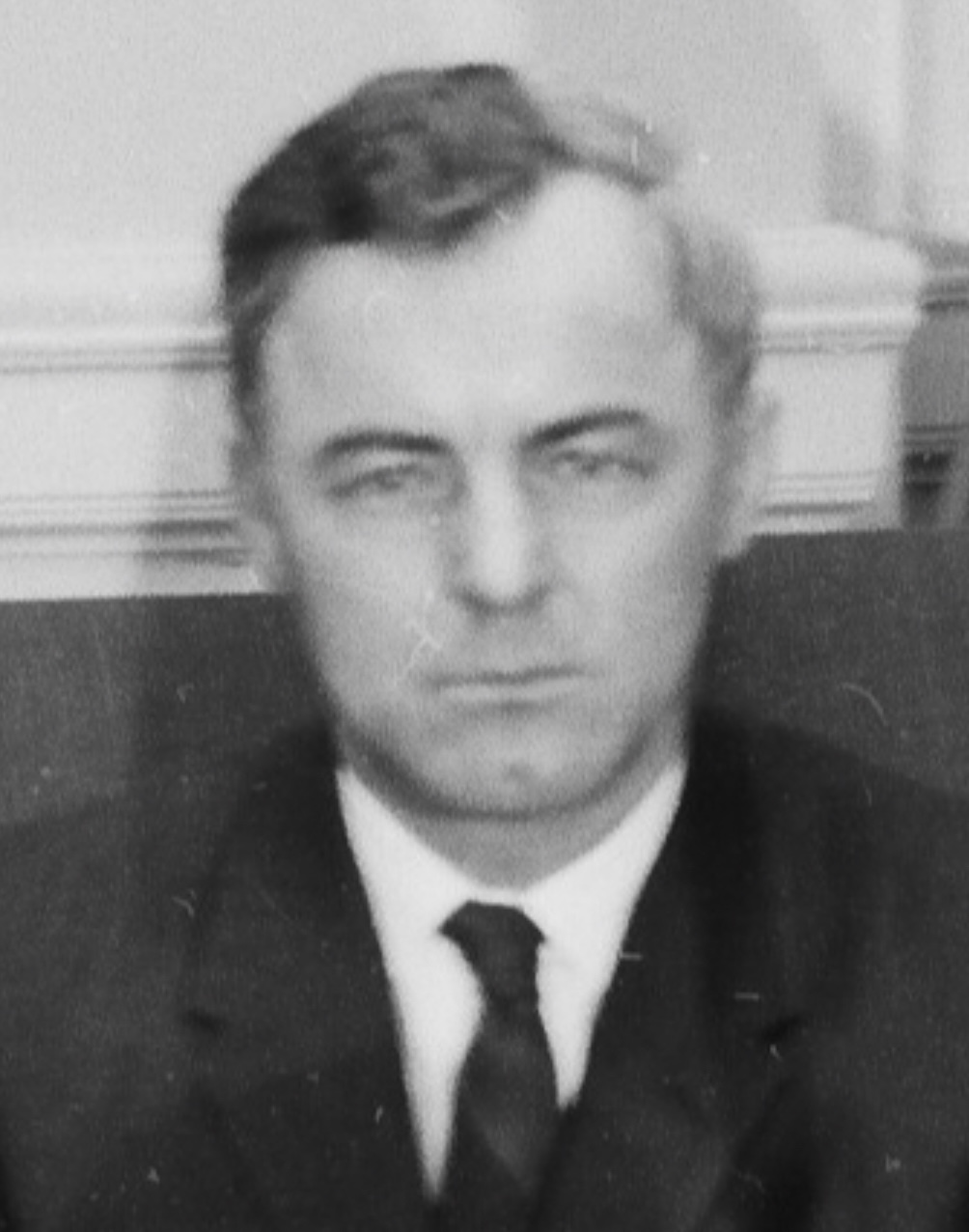
| Nominee | Margaret Chase Smith | Elmer H. Violette |
| Party | Republican | Democratic |
| Popular vote | 188,291 | 131,136 |
| Percentage | 58.93% | 41.04% |
- County results Smith: 50–60% 60–70% 70–80% Violette: 50–60%
U.S. senator before election
Margaret Chase Smith
Republican
Elected U.S. senator
Margaret Chase Smith
Republican

Republican incumbent Margaret Chase Smith won reelection to a fourth term over Democrat Elmer H. Violette, a state legislator and future judge of the Maine Supreme Judicial Court.

1966 United States Senate election in Maine
| Party | Candidate | Votes | % |
|---|---|---|---|
| Republican | Margaret Chase Smith (Incumbent) | 188,291 | 58.93 |
| Democratic | Elmer H. Violette | 131,136 | 41.04 |
| None | Scattering | 108 | 0.03 |
| Majority | | 57,155 | 17.89 |
| Turnout | | 319,535 | |
| Republican hold | | | |

== Massachusetts ==
1966 United States Senate election in Massachusetts
- November 8, 1966
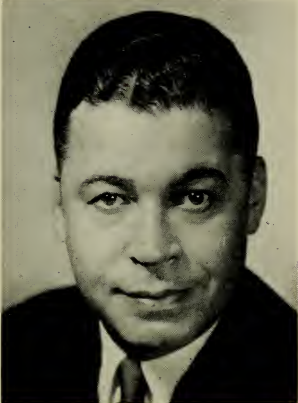

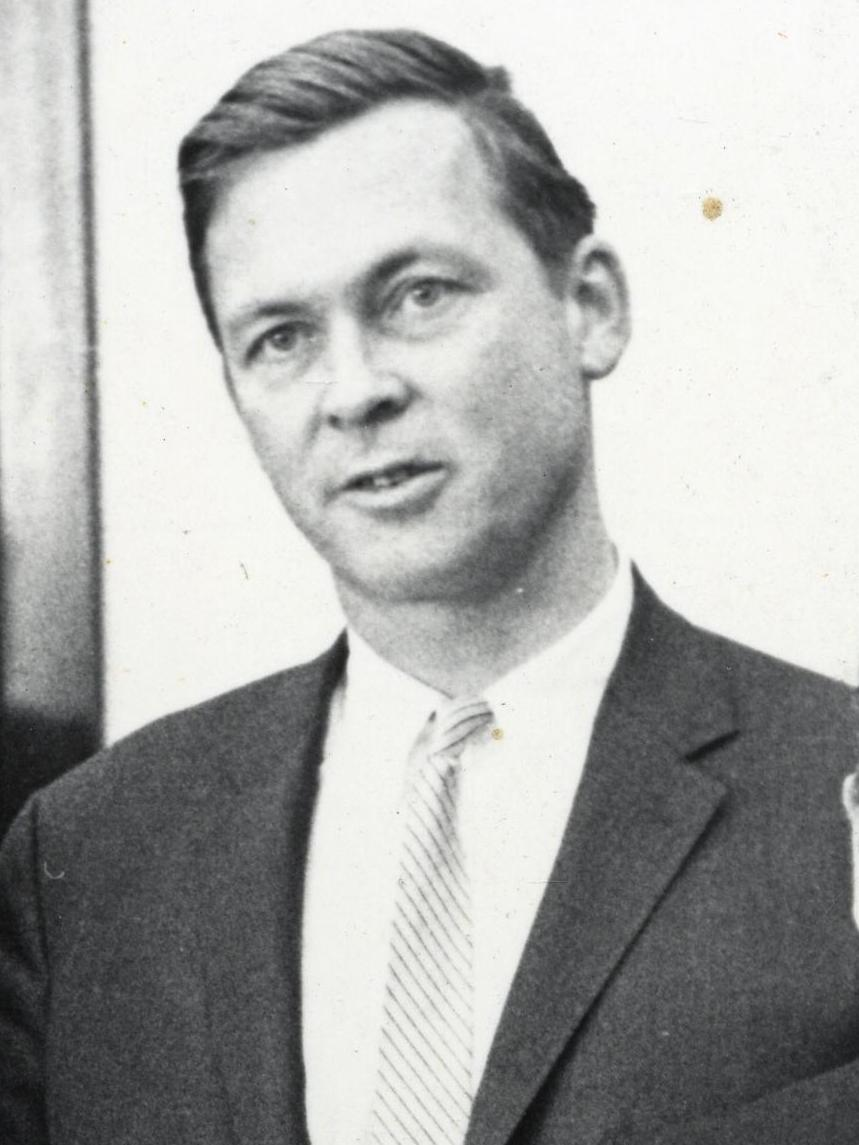
| Nominee | Edward Brooke | Endicott Peabody |
| Party | Republican | Democratic |
| Popular vote | 1,213,473 | 774,761 |
| Percentage | 60.68% | 38.74% |

Brooke
40–50%
50–60%
60–70%
70–80%
80–90%
90–100%
Peabody
40–50%
50–60%
60–70%
U.S. senator before election
Leverett Saltonstall
Republican
Elected U.S. Senator
Edward Brooke
Republican

Republican State Attorney General Edward Brooke defeated his challengers. Republican incumbent, Leverett Saltonstall, was retiring after serving for 22 years. Brooke was the first black U.S. senator elected since Reconstruction.

Democratic primary
| Party | Candidate | Votes | % |
|---|---|---|---|
| Democratic | Endicott Peabody (Note: Governor of Massachusetts from January 3, 1963 to January 7, 1965.) | 320,967 | 50.35% |
| Democratic | John F. Collins (Note: Mayor of Boston since 1960.) | 265,016 | 41.85 |
| Democratic | Thomas Boylston Adams (Note: Academician and business executive of the Adams political family, running as an anti-war candidate.) | 51,435 | 8.07 |

General election
| Party | Candidate | Votes | % | ±% |
|---|---|---|---|---|
| Republican | Edward Brooke (Note: Chairman of the Boston Finance Commission from 1961 to 1962 and Massachusetts Attorney General since 1962.) | 1,213,473 | 60.68% | +4.49% |
| Democratic | Endicott Peabody | 774,761 | 38.74 | −4.72% |
| Socialist Labor | Lawrence Gilfedder (Note: Candidate for Lt. Governor in 1948. Ran for Governor in 1952 and 1954. Ran for Senate in 1958, 1960, 1962, 1964, 1966, and 1970.) | 6,790 | 0.34 | +0.10% |
| Prohibition | Mark R. Shaw (Note: Candidate for U.S. senator from Massachusetts in 1946, 1952, 1958, 1969, 1962, and 1970. He was also the party's candidate for governor of Massachusetts in 1948 and again in 1956. In 1964 he served as Prohibition Party candidate for vice-president of the United States.) | 4,833 | 0.24 | +0.12% |
| Majority | | 438,712 | 21.94 | |
| Turnout | | 1,999,857 | | |
| Republican hold | | | | |

== Michigan ==
1966 United States Senate election in Michigan
- November 8, 1966
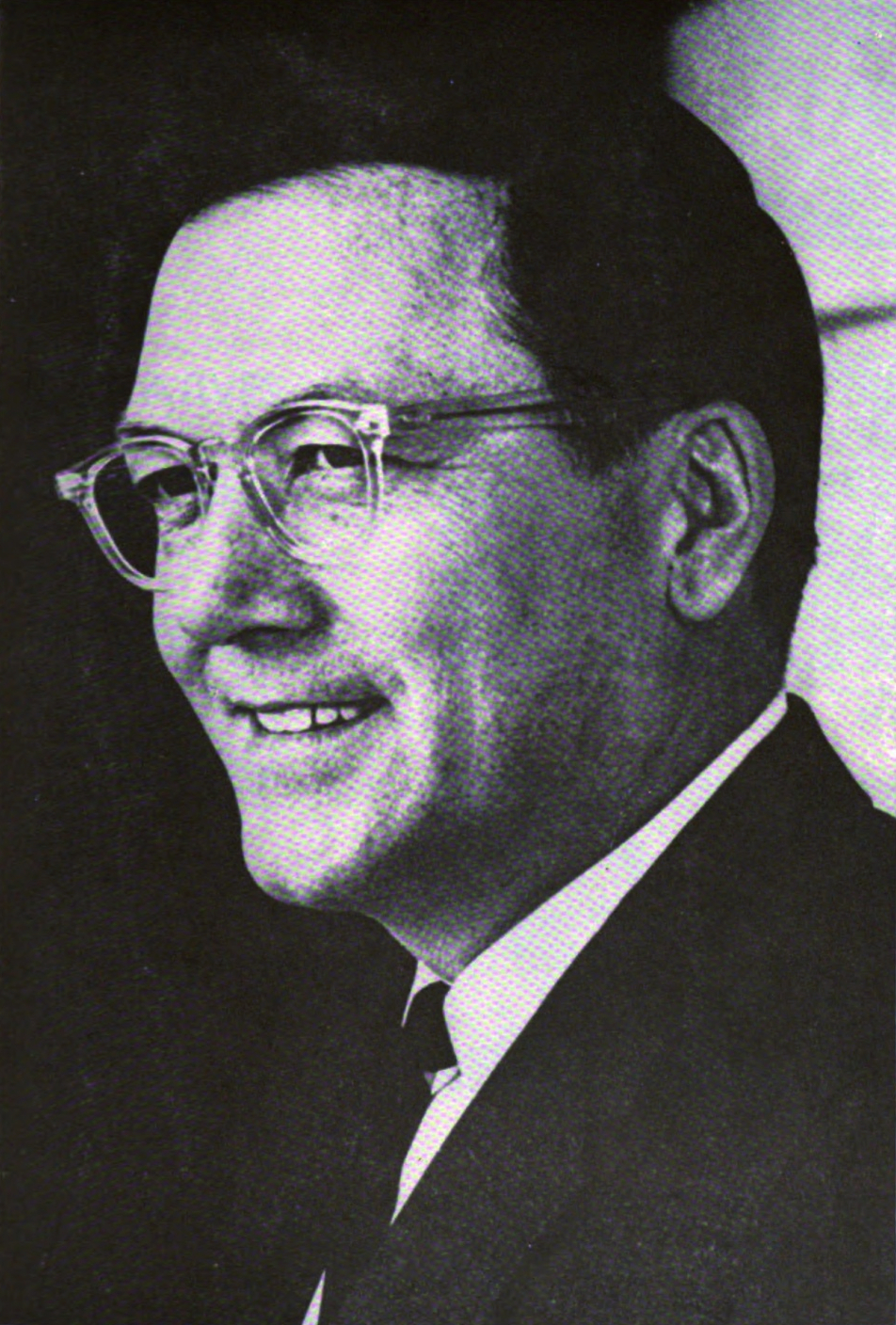

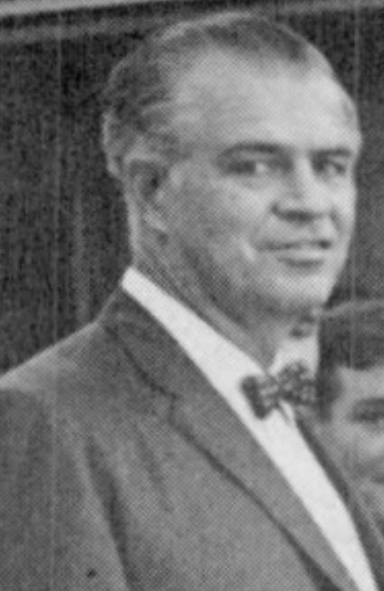
| Nominee | Robert P. Griffin | G. Mennen Williams |
| Party | Republican | Democratic |
| Popular vote | 1,363,530 | 1,069,484 |
| Percentage | 55.90% | 43.85% |
- County results Griffin: 50-60% 60-70% 70-80% Williams: 40–50% 50–60%
U.S. senator before election
Robert P. Griffin
Republican
Elected U.S. Senator
Robert P. Griffin
Republican

Republican incumbent Robert P. Griffin won reelection to a full term, having initially been appointed to the seat following the death of Patrick V. McNamara six months earlier. He defeated Democratic former Governor G. Mennen Williams.

1966 United States Senate election in Michigan
| Party | Candidate | Votes | % |
|---|---|---|---|
| Republican | Robert P. Griffin (Incumbent) | 1,363,808 | 55.88 |
| Democratic | G. Mennen Williams | 1,070,484 | 43.86 |
| Socialist Labor | Ralph M. Muncy | 6,166 | 0.25 |
| None | Scattering | 185 | 0.01 |
| Majority | | 293,324 | 12.02 |
| Turnout | | 2,440,643 | |
| Republican hold | | | |

== Minnesota ==
1966 United States Senate election in Minnesota
- November 8, 1966
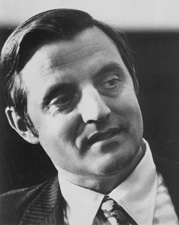

| Nominee | Walter Mondale | Robert Forsythe |
| Party | Democratic (DFL) | Republican |
| Popular vote | 685,840 | 574,868 |
| Percentage | 53.94% | 45.21% |
- County results Mondale: 40–50% 50–60% 60–70% 70–80% Forsythe: 40–50% 50–60% 60–70%
U.S. senator before election
Walter Mondale
Democratic (DFL)
Elected U.S. Senator
Walter Mondale
Democratic (DFL)

Incumbent Democratic U.S. senator Walter Mondale, who had originally been appointed in 1964 to replace Hubert Humphrey after Humphrey was elected Vice President of the United States, defeated Republican challenger Robert A. Forsythe, to win a full term.

Democratic primary
| Party | Candidate | Votes | % |
|---|---|---|---|
| Democratic (DFL) | Walter F. Mondale (Incumbent) | 410,841 | 90.97 |
| Democratic (DFL) | Ralph E. Franklin | 40,785 | 9.03 |

Republican primary
| Party | Candidate | Votes | % |
|---|---|---|---|
| Republican | Robert A. Forsythe | 211,282 | 81.19 |
| Republican | Henry A. Johnsen | 48,941 | 18.81 |

General election
| Party | Candidate | Votes | % |
|---|---|---|---|
| Democratic (DFL) | Walter F. Mondale (Incumbent) | 685,840 | 53.94 |
| Republican | Robert A. Forsythe | 574,868 | 45.21 |
| Socialist Workers | Joseph Johnson | 5,487 | 0.43 |
| Industrial Government | William Braatz | 5,231 | 0.41 |
| Majority | | 110,972 | 8.73 |
| Turnout | | 1,271,426 | |
| Democratic (DFL) hold | | | |

== Mississippi ==
Mississippi election
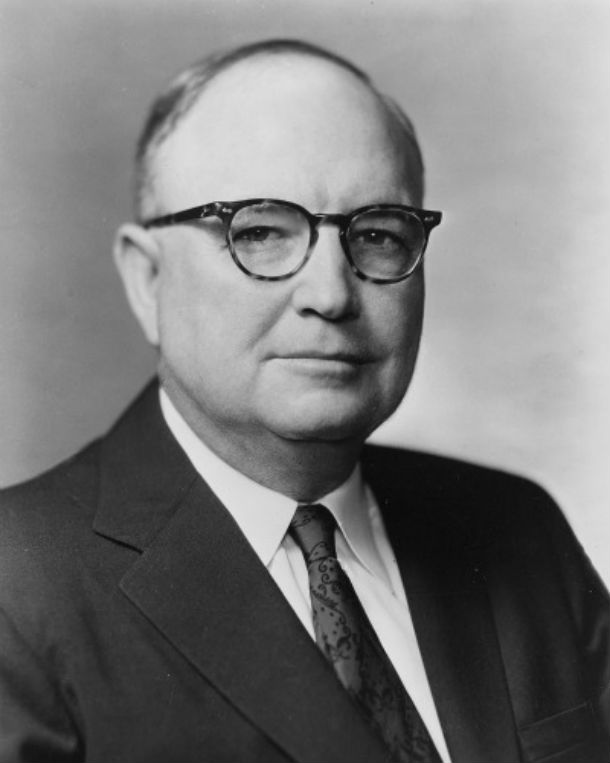

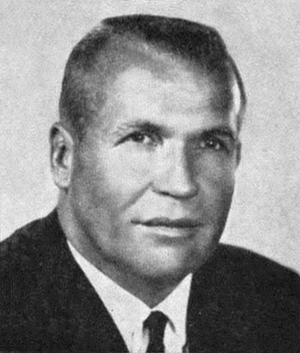
| Nominee | James O. Eastland | Prentiss Walker | Clifton R. Whitley |
| Party | Democratic | Republican | Mississippi Freedom Democratic |
| Popular vote | 258,248 | 105,150 | 30,502 |
| Percentage | 65.56% | 26.70% | 7.74% |
- County Result; Eastland: 40-50% 50-60% 60-70% 70-80% 80-90% Walker: 40-50% 50-60% 60-70%
U.S. senator before election
James O. Eastland
Democratic
Elected U.S. senator
James O. Eastland
Democratic

Incumbent James Eastland, who first entered the Senate in 1941, faced the opposition of Prentiss Walker, the state's first Republican congressman since Reconstruction.

Walker, who voted against the Civil Rights Act of 1964, ran on the right of Eastland and solely focused on the white vote, accusing him of not being hard enough in opposing integration and being friendly with President Johnson, accusations to which Eastland partisans opposed the fact Walker nominated a black constituent, Marvell Lang, to the Air Force Academy. He proudly announced he went to a meeting of the Americans for the Preservation of the White Race, a Ku Klux Klan front, enabling Eastland to proudly announce he was opposed by both the Klan and the AFL-CIO.

Eastland cast the civil rights movement with the tar of Communism and Black Power and raised the bloody shirt of Reconstruction against the candidacy of Walker. He was supported by segregationists Tom Brady, George Wallace and Leander Perez.

Most of the White voters stayed with Eastland, and Walker ironically won African-Americans in southwestern Mississippi who wanted to cast a protest vote against Eastland.

Years later, Wirt Yerger, the chairman of the Mississippi Republican Party in the 1960s, said that Walker's decision to relinquish his House seat after one term for the vagaries of a Senate race against Eastland was "very devastating" to the growth of the GOP in Mississippi.

Reverend Clifton Whitley also ran for the Mississippi Freedom Democratic Party. A sore-loser law was invoked against Whitley, who ran in the Democratic primary, and he only won one week before the election, thereby preventing to enter any serious campaign or fundraising.

1966 United States Senate election in Mississippi
| Party | Candidate | Votes | % |
|---|---|---|---|
| Democratic | James O. Eastland (Incumbent) | 258,248 | 65.56 |
| Republican | Prentiss Walker | 105,150 | 26.69 |
| Independent | Clifton R. Whitley | 30,502 | 7.74 |
| Majority | | 153,098 | 38.87 |
| Turnout | | 393,900 | |
| Democratic hold | | | |

== Montana ==
1966 United States Senate election in Montana
- November 8, 1966
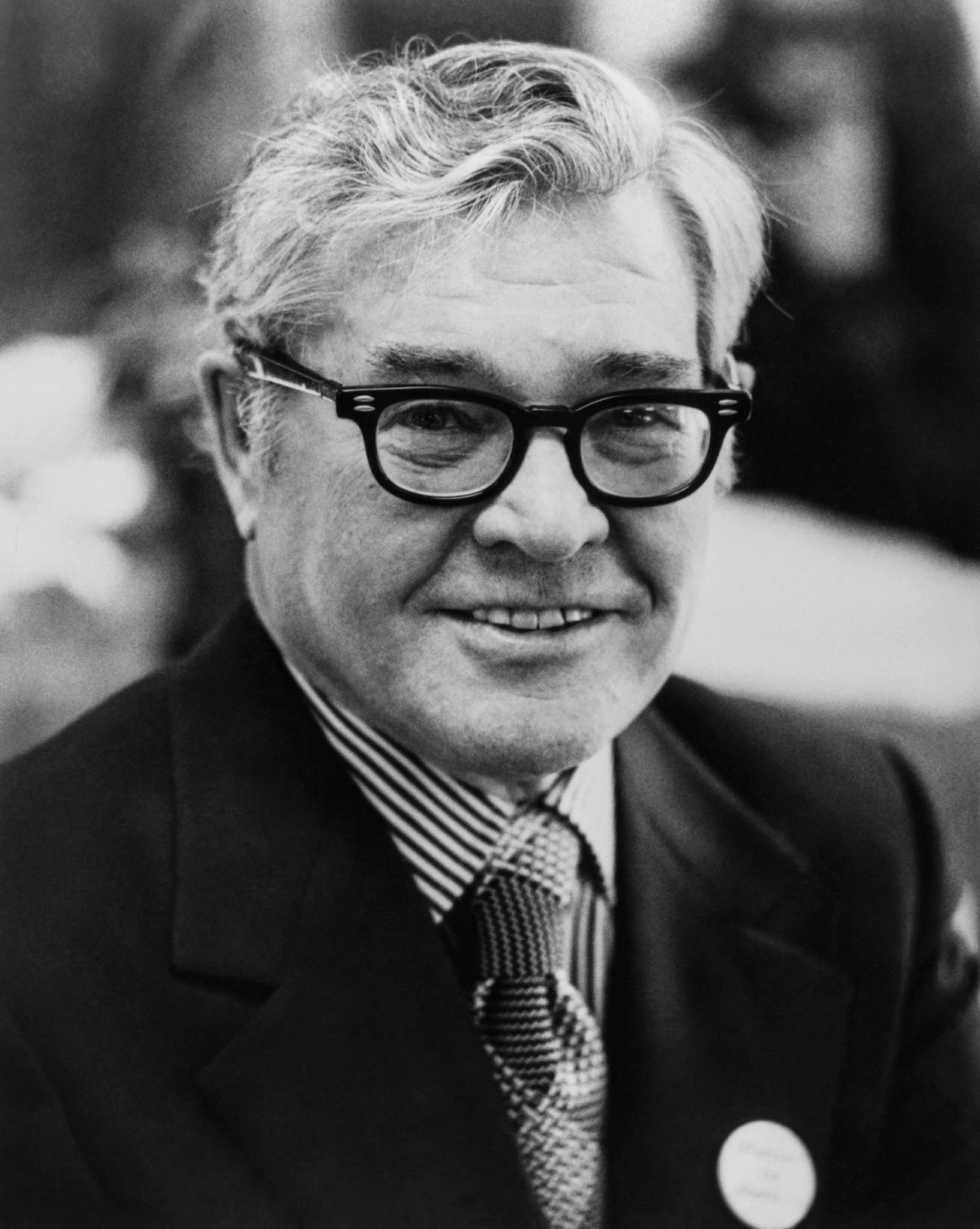

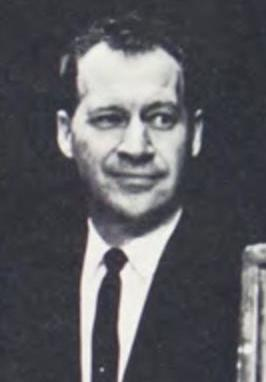
| Nominee | Lee Metcalf | Tim Babcock |
| Party | Democratic | Republican |
| Popular vote | 138,166 | 121,697 |
| Percentage | 53.17% | 46.83% |
- County results Metcalf: 50–60% 60–70% 70–80% Babcock: 50–60% 60–70%
U.S. senator before election
Lee Metcalf
Democratic
Elected U.S. Senator
Lee Metcalf
Democratic

Incumbent United States senator Lee Metcalf, who was first elected to the Senate in 1960, ran for re-election. He won the Democratic primary uncontested, and moved on to the general election, where he was opposed by Tim Babcock, the Republican nominee and the Governor of Montana. Though the race remained close, Metcalf was able to expand on his 1960 margin of victory, and defeated Babcock to win a second term.

Democratic Party primary
| Party | Candidate | Votes | % |
|---|---|---|---|
| Democratic | Lee Metcalf (Incumbent) | 73,975 | 100.00 |
| Total votes | | 73,975 | 100.00 |

Republican Primary
| Party | Candidate | Votes | % |
|---|---|---|---|
| Republican | Tim M. Babcock | 54,828 | 100.00 |
| Total votes | | 54,828 | 100.00 |

1966 United States Senate election in Montana
| Party | Candidate | Votes | % | ±% |
|---|---|---|---|---|
| Democratic | Lee Metcalf (Incumbent) | 138,166 | 53.17 | +2.44% |
| Republican | Tim M. Babcock | 121,697 | 46.83 | −2.44% |
| Majority | | 16,469 | 6.34 | +4.87% |
| Turnout | | 259,863 | | |
| Democratic hold | | Swing | | |

== Nebraska ==
1966 United States Senate election in Nebraska
- November 8, 1966
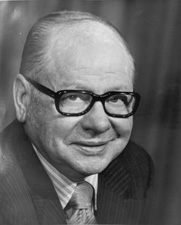

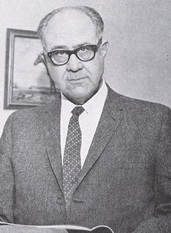
| Nominee | Carl Curtis | Frank B. Morrison |
| Party | Republican | Democratic |
| Popular vote | 296,116 | 187,950 |
| Percentage | 61.04% | 38.75% |
- County results Curtis: 50–60% 60–70% 70–80% 80–90% Morrison: 50–60%
U.S. senator before election
Carl Curtis
Republican
Elected U.S. Senator
Carl Curtis
Republican

The incumbent Republican Carl Curtis was re-elected to a third term, defeating outgoing Democratic Governor Frank B. Morrison.

1966 United States Senate election in Nebraska
| Party | Candidate | Votes | % |
|---|---|---|---|
| Republican | Carl Curtis (Incumbent) | 296,116 | 61.04 |
| Democratic | Frank B. Morrison | 187,950 | 38.74 |
| None | Scattering | 1,032 | 0.21 |
| Majority | | 108,166 | 23.30 |
| Turnout | | 485,098 | |
| Republican hold | | | |

== New Hampshire ==
1966 United States Senate election in New Hampshire
- November 8, 1966
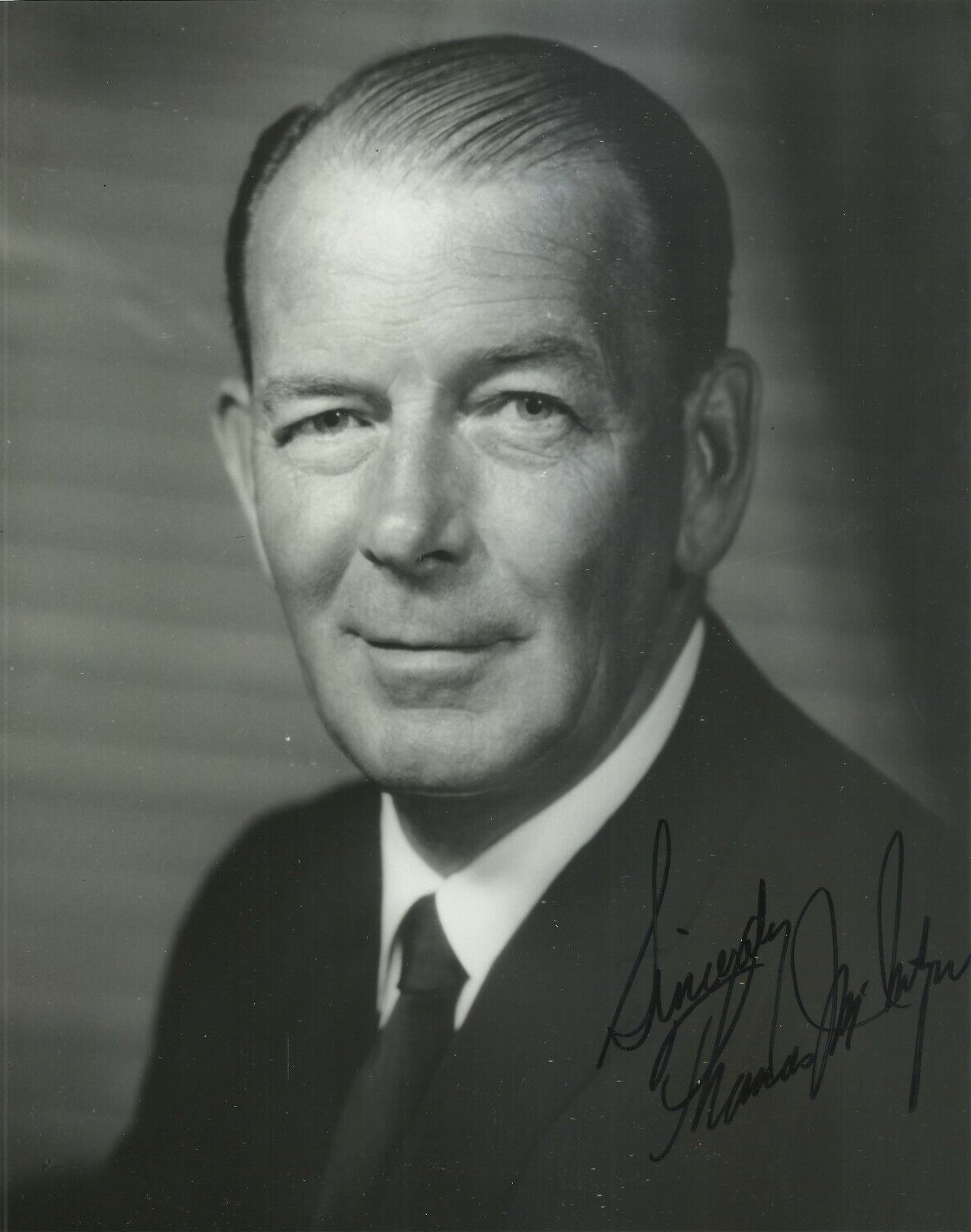

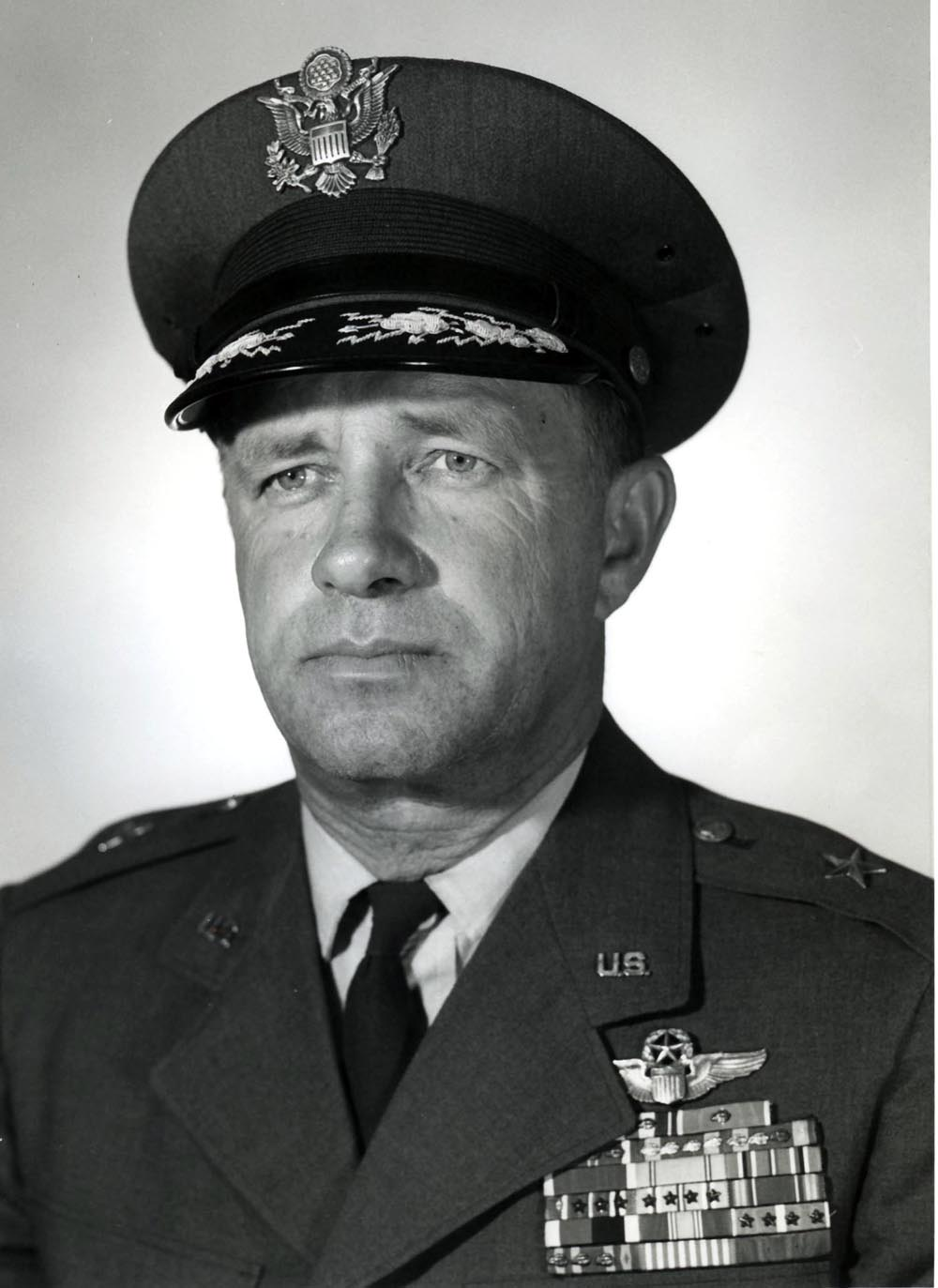
| Nominee | Thomas J. McIntyre | Harrison R. Thyng |
| Party | Democratic | Republican |
| Popular vote | 123,888 | 105,241 |
| Percentage | 54.03% | 45.90% |
- County results McIntyre: 50–60% 60–70% Thyng: 50–60% 70–80%
U.S. senator before election
Thomas J. McIntyre
Democratic
Elected U.S. Senator
Thomas J. McIntyre
Democratic

Incumbent Democrat Thomas J. McIntyre was reelected to a full term, having previously won a 1962 special election to serve out the unexpired term of the late Styles Bridges. He defeated U.S. Air Force General Harrison Thyng.

1966 United States Senate election in New Hampshire
| Party | Candidate | Votes | % |
|---|---|---|---|
| Democratic | Thomas J. McIntyre (Incumbent) | 123,888 | 54.03 |
| Republican | Harrison R. Thyng | 105,241 | 45.90 |
| Independent | Helen Bliss | 108 | 0.05 |
| Write-in | | 68 | 0.03 |
| Majority | | 18,647 | 8.13 |
| Turnout | | 229,305 | |
| Democratic hold | | | |

== New Jersey ==
New Jersey election
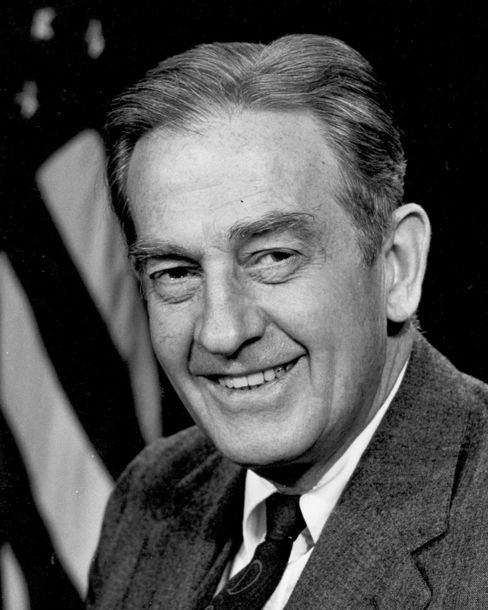

| Nominee | Clifford P. Case | Warren W. Wilentz |
| Party | Republican | Democratic |
| Popular vote | 1,278,843 | 788,021 |
| Percentage | 60.02% | 36.98% |
- County results Case: 50-60% 60-70% Wilentz: 50–60%
U.S. senator before election
Clifford P. Case
Republican
Elected U.S. Senator
Clifford P. Case
Republican

Republican incumbent Clifford P. Case was reelected to a third term in a landslide over Democratic Middlesex County Attorney Warren W. Wilentz.

1966 United States Senate election in New Jersey
| Party | Candidate | Votes | % |
|---|---|---|---|
| Republican | Clifford P. Case (Incumbent) | 1,278,843 | 60.02 |
| Democratic | Warren W. Wilentz | 788,021 | 36.98 |
| Conservative | Robert Lee Schlachter | 53,606 | 2.52 |
| Socialist Labor | Julius Levin | 10,218 | 0.48 |
| Majority | | 490,822 | 23.04 |
| Turnout | | 2,130,688 | |
| Republican hold | | | |

== New Mexico ==
1966 United States Senate election in New Mexico
- November 8, 1966
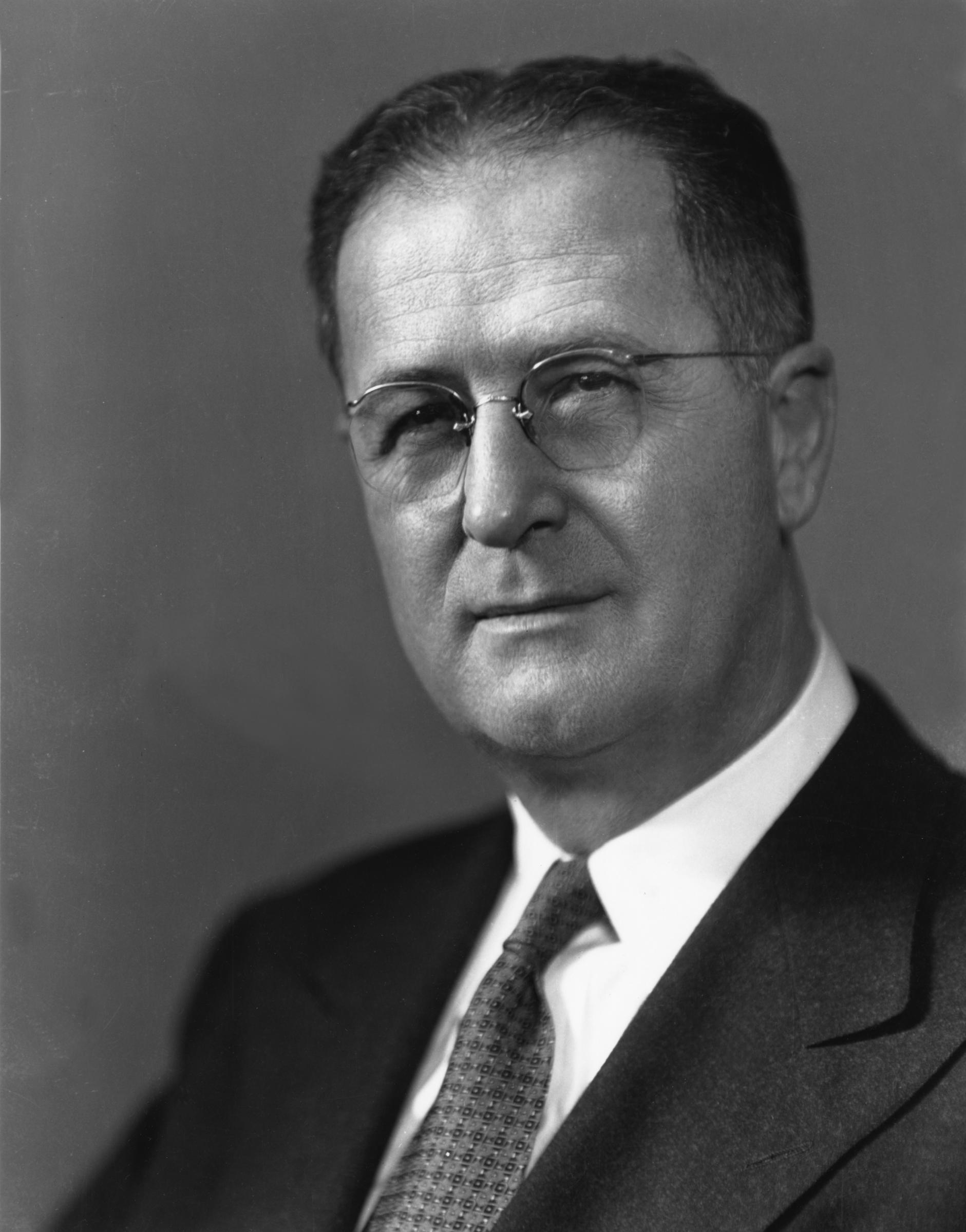

| Nominee | Clinton Anderson | Anderson Carter |
| Party | Democratic | Republican |
| Popular vote | 137,205 | 120,988 |
| Percentage | 53.14% | 46.86% |
- County results Anderson: 50–60% 60–70% Carter: 50–60% 60–70%
U.S. senator before election
Clinton Anderson
Democratic
Elected U.S. Senator
Clinton Anderson
Democratic

Democratic incumbent Clinton Anderson was reelected to a fourth term over Republican candidate Anderson Carter.

1966 United States Senate election in New Mexico
| Party | Candidate | Votes | % |
|---|---|---|---|
| Democratic | Clinton Anderson (Incumbent) | 137,205 | 53.14 |
| Republican | Anderson Carter | 120,988 | 46.86 |
| Majority | | 16,217 | 7.28 |
| Turnout | | 258,193 | |
| Democratic hold | | | |

== North Carolina ==
1966 United States Senate election in North Carolina
- November 8, 1966
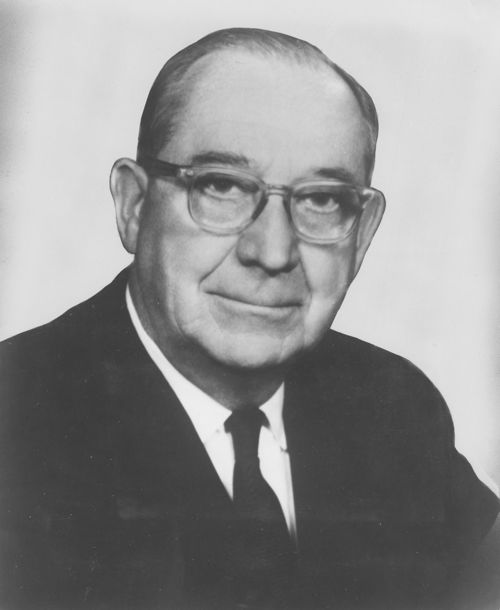

| Nominee | B. Everett Jordan | John Shallcross |
| Party | Democratic | Republican |
| Popular vote | 501,440 | 400,502 |
| Percentage | 55.59% | 44.40% |
- County results Everett: 50–60% 60–70% 70–80% 80–90% Shallcross: 50–60% 60–70%
U.S. senator before election
B. Everett Jordan
Democratic
Elected U.S. Senator
B. Everett Jordan
Democratic

Incumbent Democrat B. Everett Jordan was reelected to a second full term (and third overall), defeating Republican challenger John Shallcross.

1966 United States Senate election in North Carolina
| Party | Candidate | Votes | % |
|---|---|---|---|
| Democratic | B. Everett Jordan (Incumbent) | 501,440 | 55.59 |
| Republican | John S. Shallcross | 400,502 | 44.40 |
| Write-In | Donald R. Badgley | 36 | 0.00 |
| Majority | | 100,938 | 11.19 |
| Turnout | | 901,978 | |
| Democratic hold | | | |

== Oklahoma ==
1966 United States Senate election in Oklahoma
- November 8, 1966
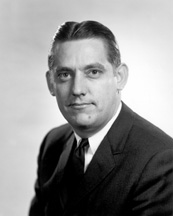

| Nominee | Fred R. Harris | Pat J. Patterson |
| Party | Democratic | Republican |
| Popular vote | 343,157 | 295,585 |
| Percentage | 53.72% | 46.28% |
- County results Harris: 50–60% 60–70% 70–80% Patterson: 50–60% 60–70%
U.S. senator before election
Fred R. Harris
Democratic
Elected U.S. Senator
Fred R. Harris
Democratic

Incumbent Democrat Fred R. Harris was reelected to a full term, having won a special election two years earlier to complete Robert S. Kerr's unexpired term. He defeated Republican candidate Pat Patterson.

1966 United States Senate election in Oklahoma
| Party | Candidate | Votes | % |
|---|---|---|---|
| Democratic | Fred R. Harris (Incumbent) | 343,157 | 53.72 |
| Republican | Pat H. Patterson | 295,585 | 46.28 |
| Majority | | 47,572 | 7.44 |
| Turnout | | 638,742 | |
| Democratic hold | | | |

== Oregon ==
1966 United States Senate election in Oregon
- November 6, 1966
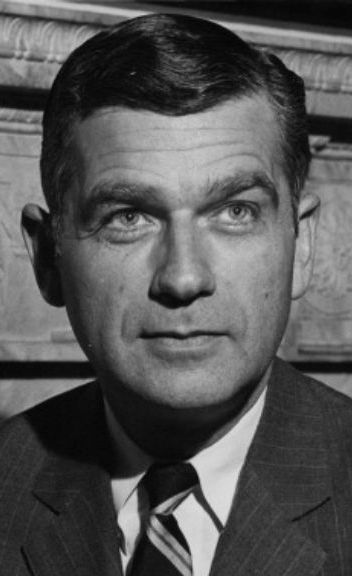

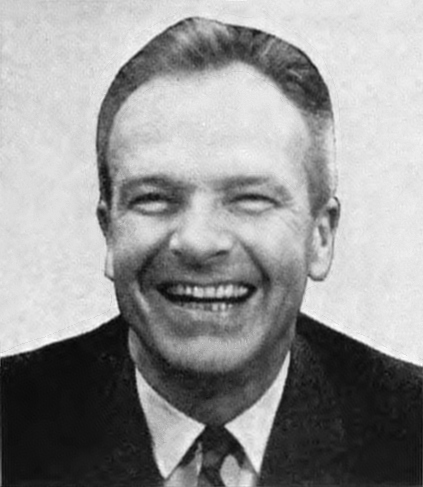
| Nominee | Mark Hatfield | Robert B. Duncan |
| Party | Republican | Democratic |
| Popular vote | 354,391 | 330,374 |
| Percentage | 51.75% | 47.25% |
- County results Hatfield: 50-60% 60-70% 70-80% Duncan: 50–60%
U.S. senator before election
Maurine Neuberger
Democratic
Elected U.S. Senator
Mark Hatfield
Republican

Incumbent Senator Maurine Brown Neuberger did not seek re-election. Held during the escalation of United States involvement of the Vietnam War, the race was between Republican candidate and incumbent Governor of Oregon Mark Hatfield, who opposed the war, and Democratic congressman Robert B. Duncan, who supported the war. In an unusual move, Oregon's other Senator, Democrat Wayne Morse, who also opposed the war, crossed party lines to endorse Hatfield, who won in a close election, his first of five terms in the United States Senate.

In March 1960, first-term U.S. senator Richard L. Neuberger died in office. Despite calls to appoint his widow, Maurine Brown Neuberger, to the position, Governor Mark Hatfield instead appointed Oregon Supreme Court justice Hall S. Lusk to fill the position until a November special election. Hatfield stated that he intended to have appointed Neuberger, but that he wanted to appoint someone who would be focused on completing the remaining eight months of the term and not running in the regular-term Senate election as Neuberger had announced she would. Some observers noted that Hatfield, a Republican, though required by state law to appoint someone of the same political party as the late Senator Neuberger, did not want to give the other party the political advantage of incumbency.

Neuberger went on to win the special election over former Oregon governor Elmo Smith, but despite the urging of Oregon congressman Robert B. Duncan, she chose not to run for a second term in 1966, citing health issues, poor relations with Oregon's senior Senator Wayne Morse, and the burden of fundraising. Duncan also urged fellow Oregon congressperson Edith Green to run for the post, but Green also declined.

On the seventh anniversary of his inauguration as Oregon's 29th governor, Hatfield announced his candidacy for the Republican nomination. In his announcement, Hatfield focused on the economic achievements in the state since his election, citing record-high employment and the creation of 138,000 jobs. Hatfield was considered vulnerable on the subject of the Vietnam War, which he opposed, in contrast with 75% of Oregonians, who favored the war. Hatfield's views on the war had been strongly affected by his own experiences: as a U.S. Navy ensign in World War II, he had been among the first to walk through the devastation caused by the atomic bombing of Hiroshima; in a later assignment in Vietnam, he saw first-hand how imperialism led to incredible disparity, with countless Vietnamese living in poverty next to opulent French mansions. The war issue gave Hatfield competition from several minor candidates on the right, but Hatfield nonetheless won by a wide margin, besting his nearest competitor, conservative evangelist Walter Huss, by a nearly 6–1 margin.

Republican primary for the United States Senate from Oregon, 1966
| Party | Candidate | Votes | % |
|---|---|---|---|
| Republican | Mark Hatfield | 174,280 | 75.18 |
| Republican | Walter Huss | 31,368 | 13.53 |
| Republican | Jim Bacaloff | 19,547 | 8.43 |
| Republican | George Altvater | 6,637 | 2.86 |
| Total votes | | 231,832 | 100.00 |

In March 1966, Duncan announced his candidacy for the Democratic nomination, which was quickly endorsed by Neuberger. In his speech announcing his candidacy, Duncan reiterated his strong support for President Lyndon B. Johnson's escalation of the Vietnam War with its goal of stopping Communist expansion in Asia. Duncan's strong announcement exposed a rift among Oregon Democrats, including Oregon's senior Senator Wayne Morse, a leading anti-war voice, and Duncan's House colleague, Edith Green. Green had urged Duncan to run, but Duncan's hawkish statement troubled her. Soon after Duncan announced his candidacy, Howard Morgan, a former member of the Federal Power Commission, announced he was running as an anti-war option to Duncan. Morgan had the support of Morse and Green (though Green's endorsement did not come until the final week of the campaign), and Duncan had the endorsement of most of the party organization and the major newspapers in the state. When the results were announced, Duncan won by a nearly 2–1 margin in one of the first elections in which the Vietnam War was a central issue.

Democratic primary for the United States Senate from Oregon, 1966
| Party | Candidate | Votes | % |
|---|---|---|---|
| Democratic | Robert B. Duncan | 161,189 | 62.20 |
| Democratic | Howard Morgan | 89,174 | 34.41 |
| Democratic | Gilbert L. Meyer | 8,788 | 3.39 |
| Total votes | | 259,151 | 100.00 |

The general election was now set up between two participants whose views on the Vietnam War were in direct opposition to many in their party: Duncan, a pro-war Democrat and Hatfield, an anti-war Republican. With more than three-quarters of Oregonians sharing his view on the war, Duncan used the issue to attack Hatfield, stating that the outcome of the war would determine "whether Americans will die in the buffalo grass of Vietnam or the rye grass of Oregon." Duncan also stressed that his election was necessary to provide a pro-Government voice for Oregon to counteract the anti-war views of Senator Morse. Morse, who had strongly supported Duncan's rival in the primary, now went across party lines and threw his support to Hatfield, though he did not campaign for him.

Hatfield, whose popularity as Governor had made him the favorite in the race, soon found his campaign in trouble. Morse's support backfired among many Republicans; Morse had left their party in 1952 to join the Democrats a few years later, and many worried that Hatfield would follow the same path. At a June conference of governors of all 50 states, Hatfield was the lone dissenter on a resolution expressing support for the war, calling the resolution a "blank check" for President Johnson's conduct of the war. By the middle of the summer, fueled by the departure of Republican hawks (such as former Oregon State Treasurer and 1962 Senate candidate Sig Unander who wholeheartedly endorsed Duncan), and with a strong majority of voters in the state already registered as Democrats, Duncan surged to a lead in most polls.

While Hatfield did not back away from his war stance, he sought to focus his campaign on other issues, chiefly focusing on the Johnson administration's economic policies that, in Hatfield's view, had created a recession that was creating unemployment in Oregon's timber industry. As the election neared in early fall, Hatfield had pulled even with Duncan with momentum on his side. Hatfield won in 27 of Oregon's 36 counties en route to a solid but narrow 52%-48% victory. In his victory speech, Hatfield maintained that the vote was not a referendum on the war and that "neither Hanoi nor Washington should misread the results."

1966 United States Senate election in Oregon
| Party | Candidate | Votes | % |
|---|---|---|---|
| Republican | Mark Hatfield | 354,391 | 51.75 |
| Democratic | Robert B. Duncan | 330,374 | 48.25 |
| Total votes | | 684,765 | 100.00 |
| Republican gain from Democratic | | | |

Hatfield would be re-elected to five more terms, most comfortably, before retiring from the Senate in 1996. Duncan sought revenge against Morse in the Democratic primary of the 1968 Senate election, but came in second in a close three-way primary that he might have won had not a third candidate drawn off some anti-Morse votes. After Morse's loss to Bob Packwood in the 1968 general election, Duncan and Morse again squared off for the Democratic nomination in the 1972 Senate election to face Hatfield. Morse won again, and lost to Hatfield in the general election. In 1974, Duncan was re-elected to the House of Representatives. He served three terms before being defeated in the Democratic primary by Ron Wyden in 1980.

== Rhode Island ==
1966 United States Senate election in Rhode Island
- November 8, 1966
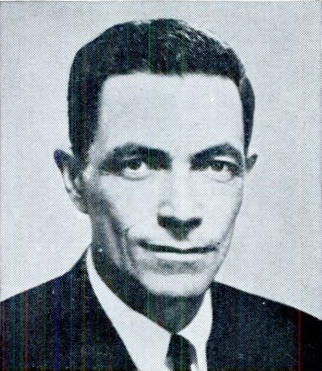

| Nominee | Claiborne Pell | Ruth M. Briggs |
| Party | Democratic | Republican |
| Popular vote | 219,331 | 104,838 |
| Percentage | 67.66% | 32.34% |
- County results Pell: 50–60% 60–70% 70–80%
U.S. senator before election
Claiborne Pell
Democratic
Elected U.S. Senator
Claiborne Pell
Democratic

Democratic incumbent Claiborne Pell was reelected to a second term over Republican challenger Ruth M. Briggs.

1966 United States Senate election in Rhode Island
| Party | Candidate | Votes | % |
|---|---|---|---|
| Democratic | Claiborne Pell (Incumbent) | 219,331 | 67.66 |
| Republican | Ruth M. Briggs | 104,838 | 32.34 |
| Majority | | 114,493 | 35.32 |
| Turnout | | 324,169 | |
| Democratic hold | | | |

== South Carolina ==
There were two elections, due to the death of Olin D. Johnston in 1965.

=== South Carolina (regular) ===
1966 United States Senate election in South Carolina
- November 8, 1966
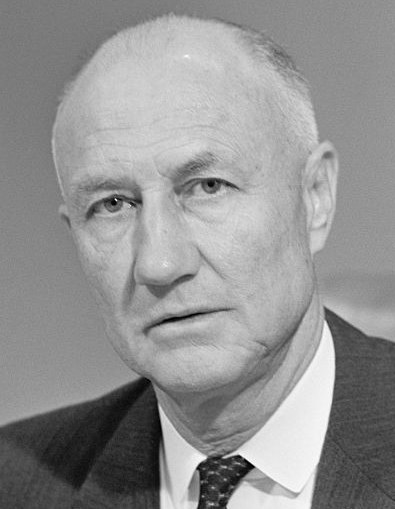

| Nominee | Strom Thurmond | Bradley Morrah |
| Party | Republican | Democratic |
| Popular vote | 271,297 | 164,955 |
| Percentage | 62.19% | 37.81% |
- County results Thurmond: 50-59% 60-69% 70-79% Morrah: 50-59%
U.S. senator before election
Strom Thurmond
Republican
Elected U.S. Senator
Strom Thurmond
Republican

Incumbent Strom Thurmond, who had switched parties from Democratic to Republican in 1964, easily defeated state senator Bradley Morrah in the general election.

The two Democrats who could have defeated Thurmond competed against each other in the special election to serve the remaining two years of Olin D. Johnston's six-year term. As a result, little known state senator Bradley Morrah of Greenville won the South Carolina Democratic Party primary election on June 14 against John Bolt Culbertson to become the nominee in the general election.

Democratic Primary
| Candidate | Votes | % |
|---|---|---|
| Bradley Morrah | 167,401 | 55.9 |
| John Bolt Culbertson | 131,870 | 44.1 |

Senator Strom Thurmond faced no opposition from South Carolina Republicans and avoided a primary election.

Morrah faced an uphill struggle against Senator Thurmond because the Democratic resources were primarily poured into the special election to help Fritz Hollings and in the gubernatorial contest for Robert Evander McNair. Furthermore, Thurmond refused to debate Morrah and Thurmond boasted of the endorsements he received from Southern Democratic senators Richard Russell Jr., John C. Stennis, and Herman Talmadge. Morrah was easily dispatched by Thurmond in the general election and he also lost re-election to his state senate seat. He would never again hold public office, which was a routine occurrence for Thurmond's opponents.

1966 South Carolina election
| Party | Candidate | Votes | % | ±% |
|---|---|---|---|---|
| Republican | Strom Thurmond (Incumbent) | 271,297 | 62.2 | +62.2% |
| Democratic | Bradley Morrah | 164,955 | 37.8 | −62.2% |
| Majority | | 106,342 | 24.4 | −75.6% |
| Turnout | | 436,252 | 49.1% | −6.3% |
| Republican hold | | | | |

=== South Carolina (special) ===
1966 United States Senate special election in South Carolina
- November 8, 1966
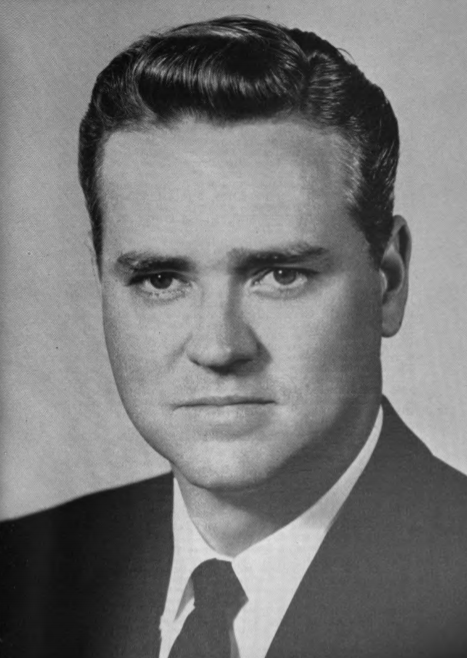

| Nominee | Ernest Hollings | Marshall Parker |
| Party | Democratic | Republican |
| Popular vote | 223,790 | 212,032 |
| Percentage | 51.35% | 48.65% |
- County results Hollings: 50–60% 60–70% Parker: 50-60% 60-70%
U.S. senator before election
Donald S. Russell
Democratic
Elected U.S. Senator
Ernest Hollings
Democratic

The election resulted from the death of Senator Olin D. Johnston in 1965. Then-Governor Donald S. Russell entered in a prearranged agreement with Lieutenant Governor Robert Evander McNair in which Russell would resign his post so that he could be appointed Senator. However, former Governor Fritz Hollings won the Democratic primary election and went on to beat Republican state senator Marshall Parker in the general election to fill the remaining two years of the unexpired term.

In the 1962 gubernatorial election, Donald S. Russell had stated that he would serve out a full term and not seek a higher office. However, midway through his term he resigned from the governorship so that he could be appointed to the United States Senate. Russell faced a challenge in the Democratic primary from former Governor Fritz Hollings, who had lost to Olin D. Johnston in the 1962 primary for the same Senate seat. On June 14, the South Carolina Democratic Party held their primary election and Hollings scored a comfortable victory over Russell to become the Democratic nominee.

Democratic Primary
| Candidate | Votes | % |
|---|---|---|
| Fritz Hollings | 196,405 | 60.8% |
| Donald S. Russell (Incumbent) | 126,595 | 39.2% |

The South Carolina Republican Party was in the beginning stages of becoming a major political party in South Carolina politics. It had few elected officials in the state and when state senator Marshall Parker from Oconee County sought the Republican nomination, he did not face any opposition.

Parker faced an uphill battle in winning the Senate seat. First, the state was dominated by the Democratic Party and any Republican politician faced a tough time seeking election. However, there was hope for Republicans because Barry Goldwater had won the state in the 1964 presidential election. Nevertheless, most of the resources of the Republican party were allocated for Strom Thurmond's re-election campaign and Joseph O. Rogers Jr.'s unsuccessful gubernatorial election bid. In spite of these challenges, Parker was able to kept the race close and almost unseated Hollings in the general election.

South Carolina special election
| Party | Candidate | Votes | % | ±% |
|---|---|---|---|---|
| Democratic | Fritz Hollings | 223,790 | 51.3 | −5.9% |
| Republican | Marshall Parker | 212,032 | 48.7 | +5.9% |
| Majority | | 11,758 | 2.6 | −11.8% |
| Turnout | | 435,822 | 49.1% | +2.2% |
| Democratic hold | | | | |

Hollings's first Senate victory was also his closest and he was easily re-elected in 1968 (full term), 1974, 1980, and 1986, with somewhat tougher races in 1992 and 1998, although neither with a margin as narrow as that of his initial election. He eventually became seventh longest-serving senator in history (just behind Robert Byrd, Thurmond, Ted Kennedy, Daniel Inouye, Carl Hayden and John C. Stennis). He and Thurmond were also the longest-serving Senate duo. Because of this, despite his length of service, Hollings spent 36 years as the junior Senator, even though - with his penultimate term - he had gained seniority of all but four of his colleagues - Byrd, Thurmond, Inouye and Kennedy. Hollings went on to become a nationally important political figure, e.g., serving as Chairman of the Budget committee.

== South Dakota ==
1966 United States Senate election in South Dakota
- November 8, 1966
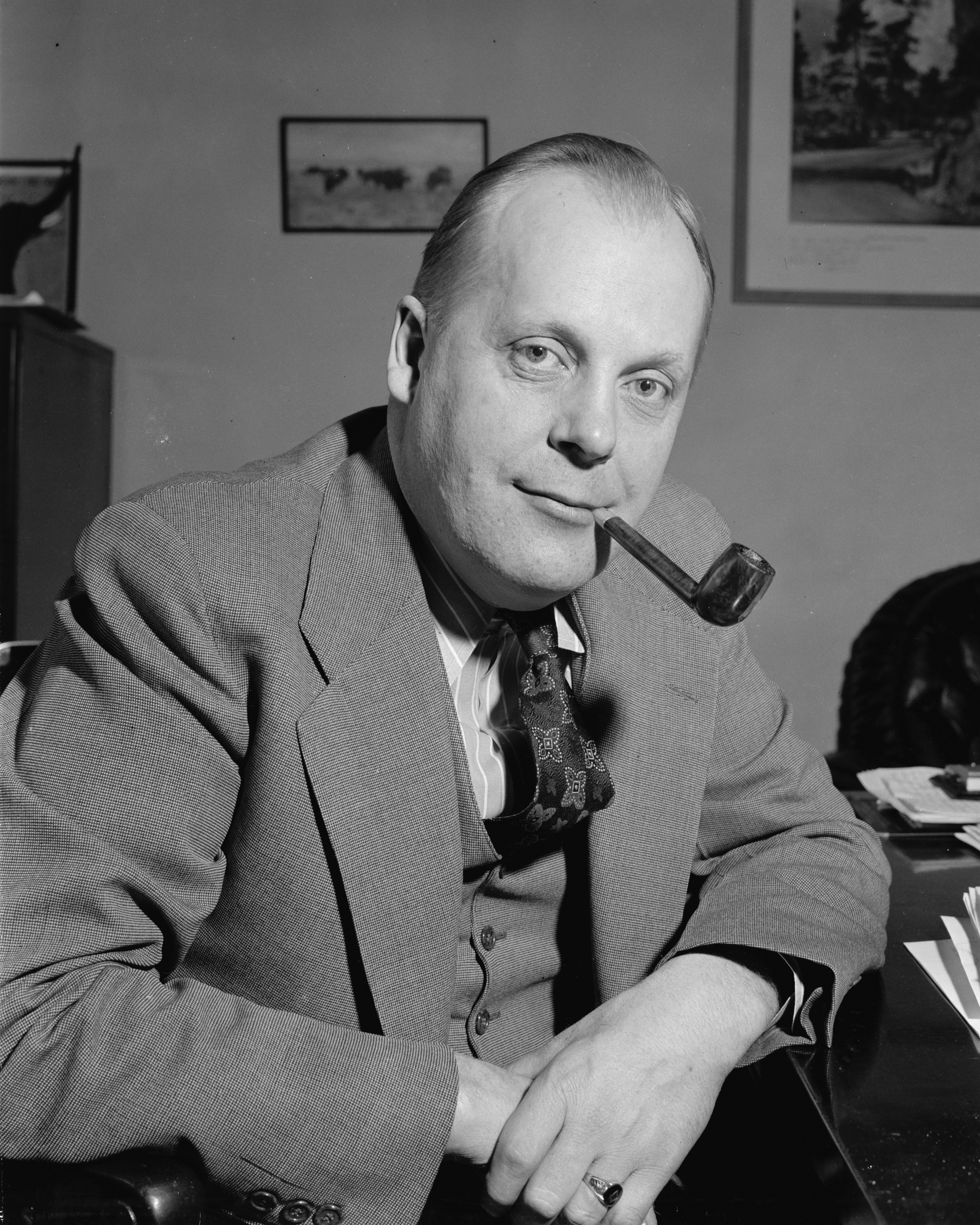

| Nominee | Karl E. Mundt | Donn H. Wright |
| Party | Republican | Democratic |
| Popular vote | 150,517 | 76,563 |
| Percentage | 66.28% | 33.72% |
- County results Mundt: 50–60% 60–70% 70–80% 80–90% Wright: 50–60%
U.S. senator before election
Karl E. Mundt
Republican
Elected U.S. Senator
Karl E. Mundt
Republican

Incumbent Republican Karl Mundt was reelected to a fourth term over Democratic state legislator Donn Wright.

1966 United States Senate election in South Dakota
| Party | Candidate | Votes | % |
|---|---|---|---|
| Republican | Karl E. Mundt (Incumbent) | 150,517 | 66.28 |
| Democratic | Donn H. Wright | 76,563 | 33.72 |
| Majority | | 73,954 | 32.56 |
| Turnout | | 227,080 | |
| Republican hold | | | |

== Tennessee ==
1966 United States Senate election in Tennessee
- November 8, 1966
| Nominee | Howard Baker | Frank G. Clement |
| Party | Republican | Democratic |
| Popular vote | 483,063 | 383,843 |
| Percentage | 55.72% | 44.27% |
- County results Baker: 50–60% 60–70% 70–80% 80–90% Clement: 50–60% 60–70% 70–80%
Senator before election
Ross Bass
Democratic
Elected Senator
Howard Baker
Republican

Republican Howard Baker won the U.S. Senate election in Tennessee, he defeated the Democratic nominee, Frank G. Clement.

General election
| Party | Candidate | Votes | % |
|---|---|---|---|
| Republican | Howard Baker | 483,063 | 55.72 |
| Democratic | Frank G. Clement | 383,843 | 44.27 |
| None | Write-Ins | 55 | 0.01 |
| Majority | | 99,220 | 10.45 |
| Turnout | | 866,961 | |
| Republican gain from Democratic | | | |

== Texas ==
Texas election
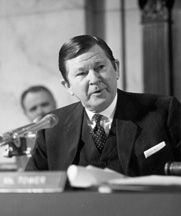

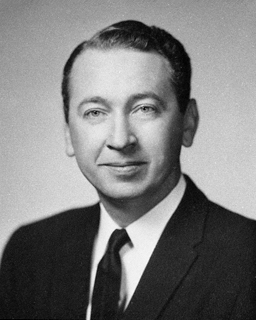
| Nominee | John Tower | Waggoner Carr |
| Party | Republican | Democratic |
| Popular vote | 842,501 | 643,855 |
| Percentage | 56.42% | 43.12% |
- County results Tower: 50–60% 60–70% 70–80% Carr: 50–60% 60–70% 70–80% 80–90% 90–100%
U.S. senator before election
John Tower
Republican
Elected U.S. Senator
John Tower
Republican

Incumbent Republican John Tower was reelected to a second term, defeating Democratic State Attorney General Waggoner Carr.

1966 United States Senate election in Texas
| Party | Candidate | Votes | % |
|---|---|---|---|
| Republican | John Tower (Incumbent) | 841,501 | 56.39 |
| Democratic | Waggoner Carr | 643,855 | 43.15 |
| Constitution | James Baker Holland | 6,778 | 0.45 |
| None | Scattering | 45 | 0.00 |
| Majority | | 197,646 | 13.24 |
| Turnout | | 1,492,179 | |
| Republican hold | | | |

== Virginia ==
There were two elections, due to the resignation of Harry F. Byrd Sr. in 1965.

=== Virginia (regular) ===
1966 United States Senate election in Virginia
- November 8, 1966
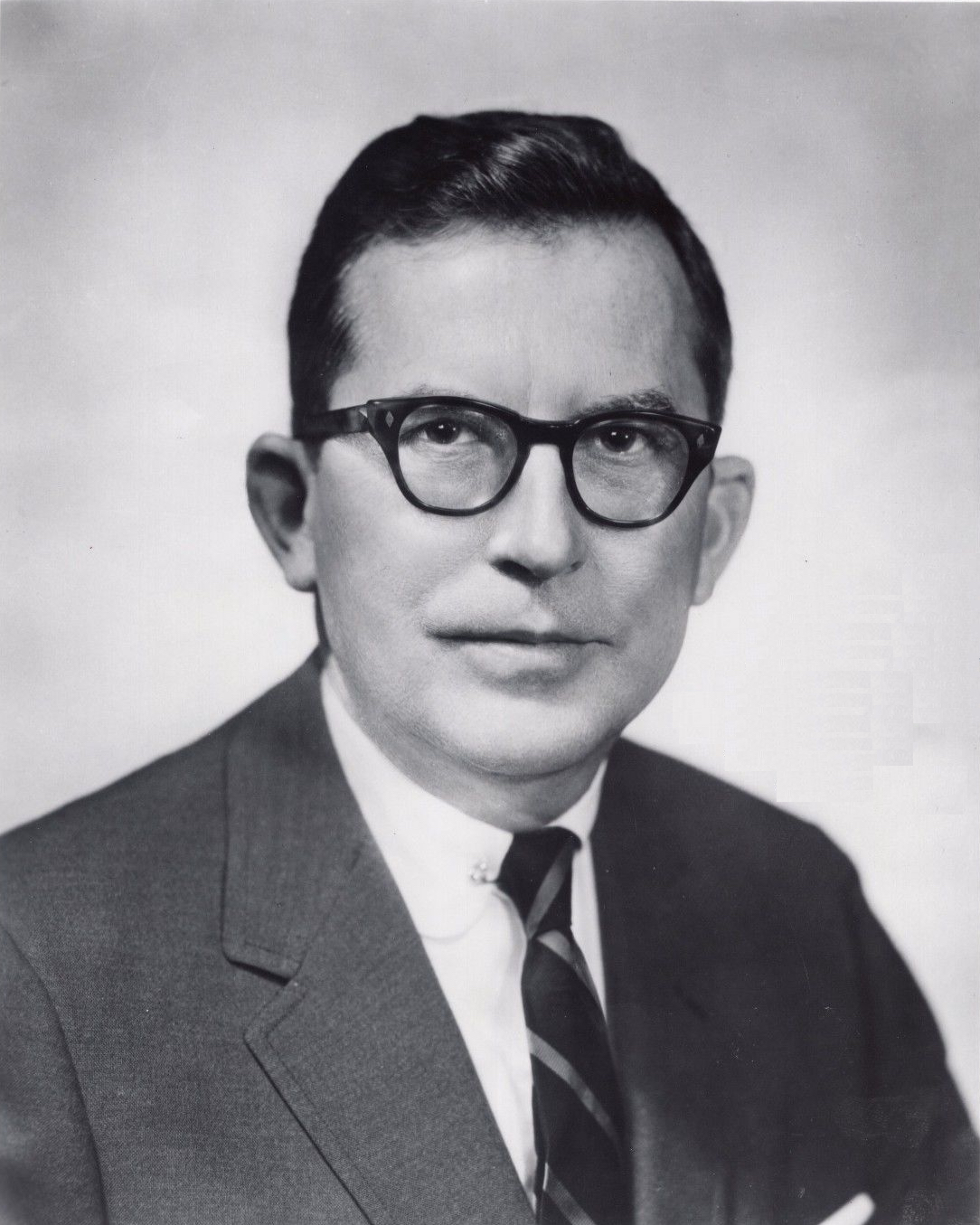

| Nominee | William B. Spong Jr. | James P. Ould Jr. | F. Lee Hawthorne |
| Party | Democratic | Republican | Conservative |
| Popular vote | 429,855 | 245,681 | 58,251 |
| Percentage | 58.57% | 33.48% | 7.94% |
- County and independent city results Spong: 30–40% 40–50% 50–60% 60–70% 70–80% 80–90% Ould: 40–50% 50–60% 60–70% 70-80%
U.S. senator before election
A. Willis Robertson
Democratic
Elected U.S. Senator
William B. Spong Jr.
Democratic

Democratic State Senator William B. Spong Jr. narrowly defeated incumbent A. Willis Robertson in the Democratic primary, than defeated Republican James P. Ould Jr. and Independent F. Lee Hawthorne.

1966 United States Senate election in Virginia
| Party | Candidate | Votes | % | ±% |
|---|---|---|---|---|
| Democratic | William B. Spong Jr. | 429,855 | 58.57 | −22.70% |
| Republican | James P. Ould Jr. | 245,681 | 33.48 | +33.48% |
| Independent | F. Lee Hawthorne | 58,251 | 7.94 | |
| Write-ins | | 92 | 0.01 | −0.17% |
| Majority | | 184,174 | 25.10 | −41.93% |
| Turnout | | 733,879 | | |
| Democratic hold | | | | |

=== Virginia (special) ===
1966 United States Senate special election in Virginia
- November 8, 1966

| Nominee | Harry F. Byrd Jr. | Lawrence M. Traylor | John W. Carter |
| Party | Democratic | Republican | Independent |
| Popular vote | 389,028 | 272,804 | 57,692 |
| Percentage | 53.30% | 37.38% | 7.90% |
- County and Independent City Results; Byrd: 30-40% 40-50% 50-60% 60-70% 70-80% 80-90% Traylor: 30-40% 40-50% 50-60% 70-80%
U.S. senator before election
Harry F. Byrd Jr.
Democratic
Elected U.S. Senator
Harry F. Byrd Jr.
Democratic

Incumbent Senator Harry F. Byrd Sr. had resigned the previous year for health reasons, and his son Harry F. Byrd Jr. had been appointed to replace him. Byrd defeated Republican Lawrence M. Traylor and independent candidate John W. Carter, and was able to finish the rest of his father's term.

1966 United States Senate special election in Virginia
| Party | Candidate | Votes | % | ±% |
|---|---|---|---|---|
| Democratic | Harry F. Byrd Jr. (Incumbent) | 389,028 | 53.30 | −10.50% |
| Republican | Lawrence M. Traylor | 272,804 | 37.38 | +18.35% |
| Independent | John W. Carter | 57,692 | 7.90 | |
| Independent | J.B. Brayman | 10,180 | 1.39 | −1.91% |
| Write-ins | | 135 | 0.02 | +0.01% |
| Majority | | 116,224 | 15.92 | −28.85% |
| Turnout | | 729,839 | | |
| Democratic hold | | | | |

== West Virginia ==
1966 United States Senate election in West Virginia
- November 8, 1966
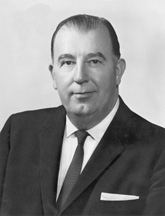

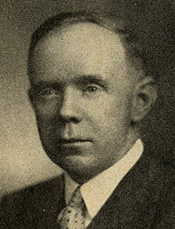
| Nominee | Jennings Randolph | Francis J. Love |
| Party | Democratic | Republican |
| Popular vote | 292,325 | 198,891 |
| Percentage | 59.51% | 40.49% |
- County results Randolph: 50–60% 60–70% 70–80% Love: 50–60% 60–70% 70–80%
U.S. senator before election
Jennings Randolph
Democratic
Elected U.S. Senator
Jennings Randolph
Democratic

1966 United States Senate election in West Virginia
| Party | Candidate | Votes | % |
|---|---|---|---|
| Democratic | Jennings Randolph (Incumbent) | 292,325 | 59.51 |
| Republican | Francis J. Love | 198,891 | 40.49 |
| Majority | | 93,434 | 19.02 |
| Turnout | | 491,216 | |
| Democratic hold | | | |

== Wyoming ==
1966 United States Senate election in Wyoming
- November 8, 1966
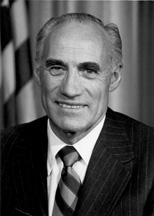

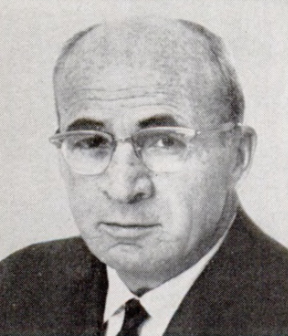
| Nominee | Clifford Hansen | Teno Roncalio |
| Party | Republican | Democratic |
| Popular vote | 63,548 | 59,141 |
| Percentage | 51.80% | 48.20% |
- County results Hansen: 50–60% 60–70% 70–80% Roncalio: 50–60% 70–80%
U.S. senator before election
Milward Simpson
Republican
Elected U.S. Senator
Clifford Hansen
Republican

1966 United States Senate election in Wyoming
| Party | Candidate | Votes | % |
|---|---|---|---|
| Republican | Clifford Hansen | 63,548 | 51.80 |
| Democratic | Teno Roncalio | 59,141 | 48.20 |
| Majority | | 4,407 | 3.60 |
| Turnout | | 122,689 | |
| Republican hold | | | |

== See also ==
- 1966 United States elections
  - 1966 United States gubernatorial elections
  - 1966 United States House of Representatives elections
- 89th United States Congress
- 90th United States Congress

== Sources ==
- Massachusetts Race details at ourcampaigns.com
- "Supplemental Report of the Secretary of State to the General Assembly of South Carolina." Reports and Resolutions of South Carolina to the General Assembly of the State of South Carolina. Volume II. Columbia, SC: 1967, pp. 16, 41.
- Bass, Jack; Marilyn W. Thompson (1998). Ol' Strom: An Unauthorized Biography of Strom Thurmond. Longstreet. pp. 222–223.
- "Supplemental Report of the Secretary of State to the General Assembly of South Carolina." Reports and Resolutions of South Carolina to the General Assembly of the State of South Carolina. Volume II. Columbia, SC: 1967, pp. 16, 41.
- "South Carolina's New Senator". Time. April 30, 1965. Archived from the original on October 22, 2012.
