= Ruth M. Briggs =

American Women's Army Corps officer

Ruth Briggs

Personal details
- Born: December 7, 1910 Hopkinton, Rhode Island, U.S.
- Died: July 2, 1985 (aged 74) Bristol, Rhode Island, U.S.
- Party: Republican
- Education: Coker College (BA); Columbia University (MA)

Ruth Mary Briggs (December 7, 1910 – July 2, 1985) was born in Hopkinton, Rhode Island. She served as a lieutenant colonel in the Women's Army Corps (WAC) and as secretary to General Walter Bedell Smith.

Briggs graduated officer candidate school at Fort Des Moines and was commissioned as a second lieutenant on August 29, 1942. She was one of the first five WAC officers sent to North Africa in 1942. Though they were rescued, Briggs and the four other WACs received an inglorious welcome to the North African theater as the ship upon which they were sailing was torpedoed and sunk during the night.

In 1966 Briggs was the Republican nominee for U.S. Senator for Rhode Island. She was defeated by Democrat Claiborne Pell.

Party political offices
Preceded by Raoul Archambault	Republican nominee for U.S. Senator from Rhode Island (Class 2); 1966	Succeeded by John Chafee
