= 1966 United States Senate election in Rhode Island =

- November 8, 1966
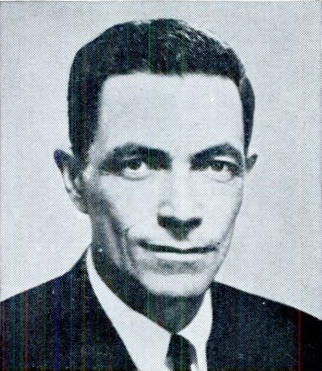

Nominee	Claiborne Pell	Ruth M. Briggs
Party	Democratic	Republican
Popular vote	219,331	104,838
Percentage	67.66%	32.34%
- Pell: 50–60% 60–70% 70–80% 80–90% Briggs: 50–60%
U.S. senator before election
Claiborne Pell
Democratic
Elected U.S. Senator
Claiborne Pell
Democratic

The 1966 United States Senate election in Rhode Island took place on November 8, 1966. Incumbent Democratic U.S. Senator Claiborne Pell successfully sought re-election, defeating Republican Ruth M. Briggs with 67.66% of the vote.

== Primary elections ==
Primary elections were held on September 13, 1966.

=== Democratic primary ===
==== Candidates ====
- Claiborne Pell, incumbent U.S. Senator

==== Results ====
Democratic primary results
Party	Candidate	Votes	%
Democratic	Claiborne Pell (Incumbent)		unopposed

=== Republican primary ===
==== Candidates ====
- Ruth M. Briggs, former lieutenant colonel in the Women's Army Corps (WAC)
- Charles H. Eden

==== Results ====
Republican primary results
Party	Candidate	Votes	%
Republican	Ruth M. Briggs	15,451	82.13%
Republican	Charles H. Eden	3,363	17.87%
Total votes		18,814	100.00%

== General election ==
=== Results ===
General election results
Party	Candidate	Votes	%
Democratic	Claiborne Pell (Incumbent)	219,331	67.66
Republican	Ruth M. Briggs	104,838	32.34
Majority		114,493	35.32
Turnout		324,169	
Democratic hold			

== Bibliography ==
- Congressional Elections, 1946-1996. Washington, D.C.: Congressional Quarterly Inc. 1998. ISBN 1-56802-248-4.
- Scammon, Richard M., ed. (1968). America Votes 7: a handbook of contemporary American election statistics, 1966. Washington, D.C.: Governmental Affairs Institute.
