= Senator Violette =

Senator Violette may refer to:

- Elmer H. Violette (1921–2000), Maine State Senate
- Paul Elmer Violette (born 1955), Maine State Senate
