= Thurgood Marshall Supreme Court nomination =

United States Supreme Court nomination

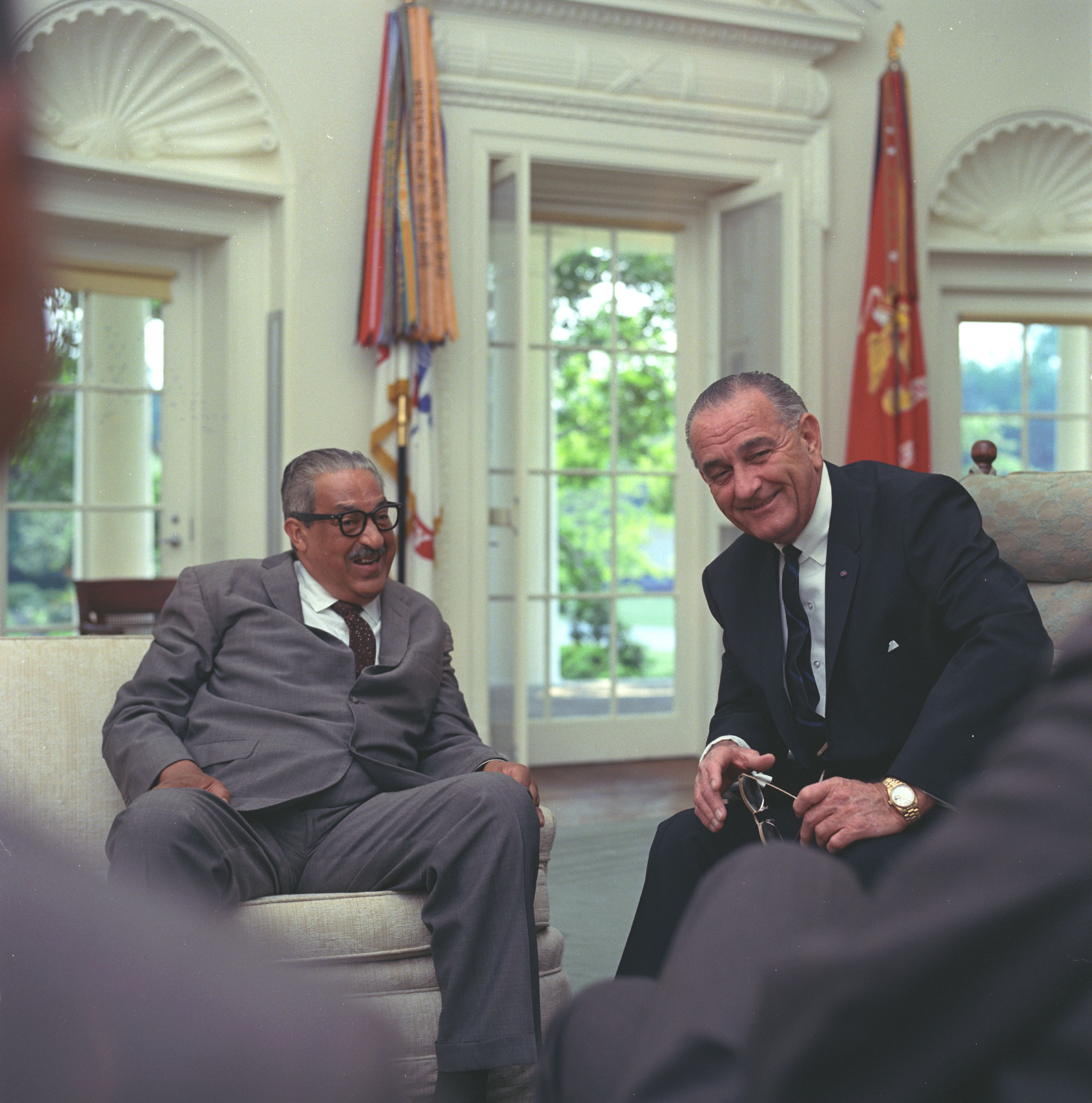
- Marshall (left) and President Johnson meet in the Oval Office of the White House on June 13, 1967 (shortly before the announcement of the nomination)
- Nominee: Thurgood Marshall
- Nominated by: Lyndon B. Johnson (president of the United States)
- Succeeding: Tom C. Clark (associate justice)
- Date nominated: June 13, 1967
- Date confirmed: August 30, 1967
- Outcome: Approved by the U.S. Senate

Senate Judiciary Committee vote
- Votes in favor: 11
- Votes against: 5
- Result: Reported favorably

Senate confirmation vote
- Votes in favor: 69
- Votes against: 11
- Not voting: 20
- Result: Confirmed

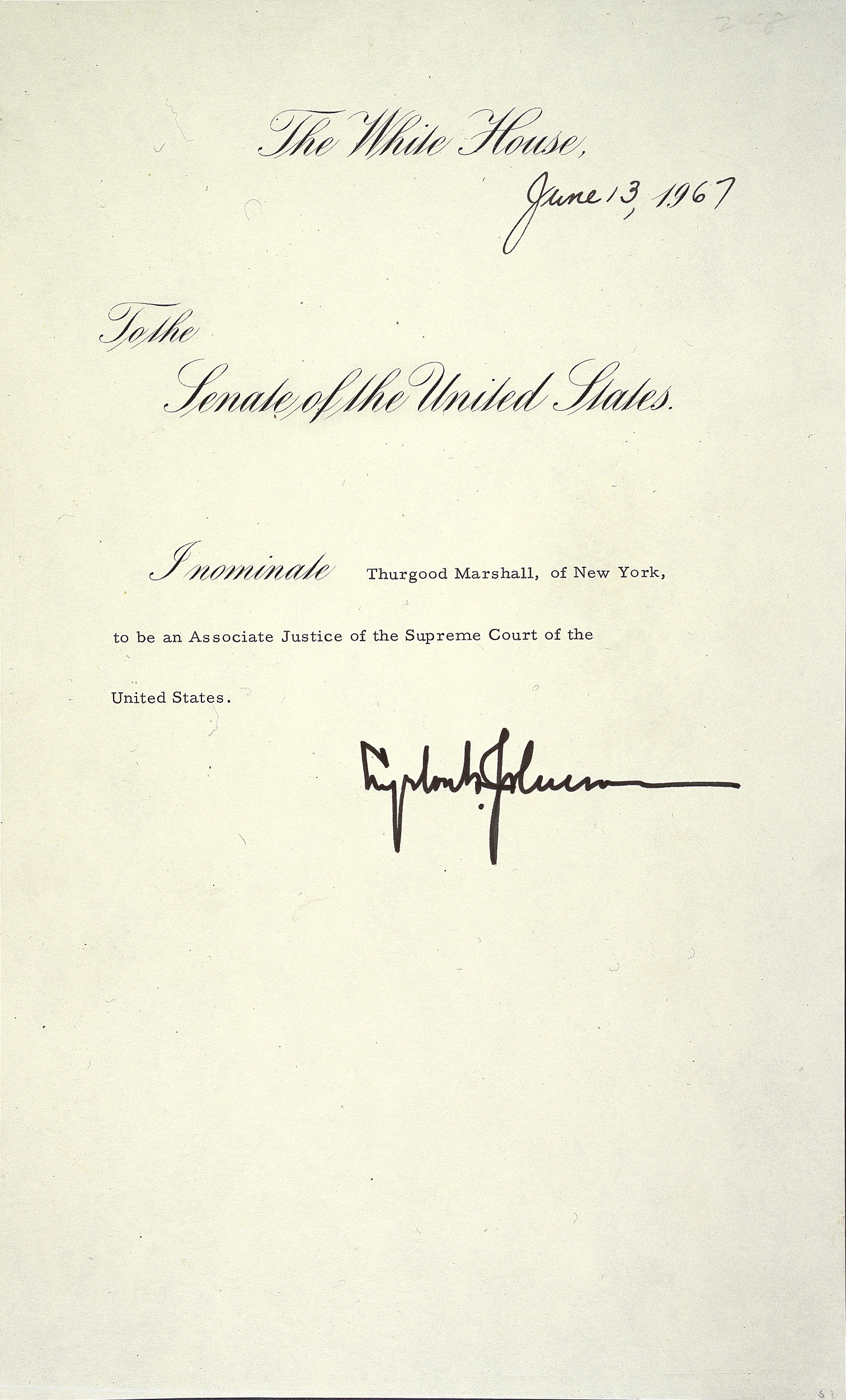
Formal nomination sent to the Senate signed by President Johnson

Thurgood Marshall was nominated to serve as an associate justice of the Supreme Court of the United States by U.S. President Lyndon B. Johnson on June 13, 1967, to fill the seat being vacated by Tom C. Clark. Per the Constitution of the United States, the nomination was subject to the advice and consent of the United States Senate, which holds the determinant power to confirm or reject nominations to the U.S. Supreme Court. Marshall was confirmed by the U.S. Senate in a 69–11 vote on August 30, 1967, becoming the first African American member of the Court, and the court's first non-white justice.

While opponents of the nomination in the United States Senate denied being motivated by racism, many supporters of racial segregation opposed the nomination.

== Background ==
In February 1967, Johnson nominated Ramsey Clark to be Attorney General. The nominee's father was Tom C. Clark, an associate justice of the Supreme Court of the United States. Fearing that his son's appointment would create substantial conflicts of interest for him, the elder Clark announced his resignation from the Court.

This was the second opportunity Johnson had had in his presidency to fill a vacancy on the Supreme Court. He had previously appointed Abe Fortas to the court in 1965. No person of color had ever been nominated to the Court, let alone served on it. Johnson, who had long desired to solidify his legacy in regards to civil rights by nominating a non-white justice, believed that the choice of a nominee to fill the ensuing vacancy "was as easy as it was obvious", according to the scholar Henry J. Abraham. Although Johnson essentially set on selecting Marshall, his advisors reportedly floated other names past him for the seat. In a group discussion, Johnson's wife, Lady Bird Johnson, noted that "Lyndon has done so much" for black people, and asked "why not indeed fill the vacancy with a woman?" Arizona Supreme Court Chief Justice Lorna E. Lockwood was the main contender if he were to opt for a woman nominee. Another woman discussed was a California judge, Shirley Hufstedler, whom Johnson later placed on the United States Court of Appeals for the Ninth Circuit. In addition, a Johnson staff member, Larry Temple, had suggested Judge A. Leon Higginbotham Jr., whom Johnson previously had appointed to the United States Court of Appeals for the Third Circuit. Johnson dismissed Higginbotham as a possibility, telling Temple, "Larry, the only two people who ever heard of Judge Higginbotham are you and his momma." Johnson briefly gave some consideration to selecting William H. Hastie (an African-American appellate judge from Philadelphia). He also did entertain the possibility of putting forward a female nominee. Ultimately, however, he decided to nominate Marshall.

Per the Constitution of the United States, the nomination was subject to the advice and consent of the United States Senate, which holds the determinant power to confirm or reject nominations to the U.S. Supreme Court.

In his career, Marshall had won 29 of the 32 cases that he had argued before the Supreme Court. Marshall had established a strong reputation as a litigator of civil rights cases for the NAACP as their chief counsel from 1948 until 1961, including landmark cases such as Brown v. Board of Education, before becoming a federal judge and then solicitor general of the United States (a position that he still held at the time he was nominated to the Supreme Court).

Marshall had previously gone through U.S. Senate confirmation processes when he was appointed to each of his two previous federal government positions (his prior judgeship and the office of solicitor general). His 1961 nomination by President John F. Kennedy to be a federal judge had been held up in the Senate Judiciary Committee for approximately a year before he was confirmed the Senate. The nomination stalled in a subcommittee of the Judiciary Committee that had assigned to hold hearings on it. After the nomination was referred to it, several months elapsed before the subcommittee held any hearings. The members of the subcommittee had been named by Judiciary Committee chairman James Eastland, who was a segregationist, and Eastland had included two segregationists on it: Olin D. Johnston and John L. McClellan. The nomination only progressed after Senator Kenneth Keating (who supported the nomination) maneuvered to remove the nomination from the subcommittee and instead bring it before the full Judiciary Committee. This was successful, and once the nomination was brought before the full Judiciary Committee, all but four members of the committee voted advance the nomination by favorably reporting on it. After this, the full Senate confirmed the nomination 56–14 on September 13, 1962, nearly a year after Marshall had been nominated. During the time that the nomination was stuck in the Judiciary Committee subcommittee, there had been encouragement from some individuals, such as Martin Luther King, that Marshall instead be nominated for a vacancy that arose on the Supreme Court. However, Kennedy instead nominated Byron White. The Judiciary Committee moved much faster on his nomination to be solicitor general, positively reporting and forwarding it to the full Senate in less than a month's time.

== Nomination ==
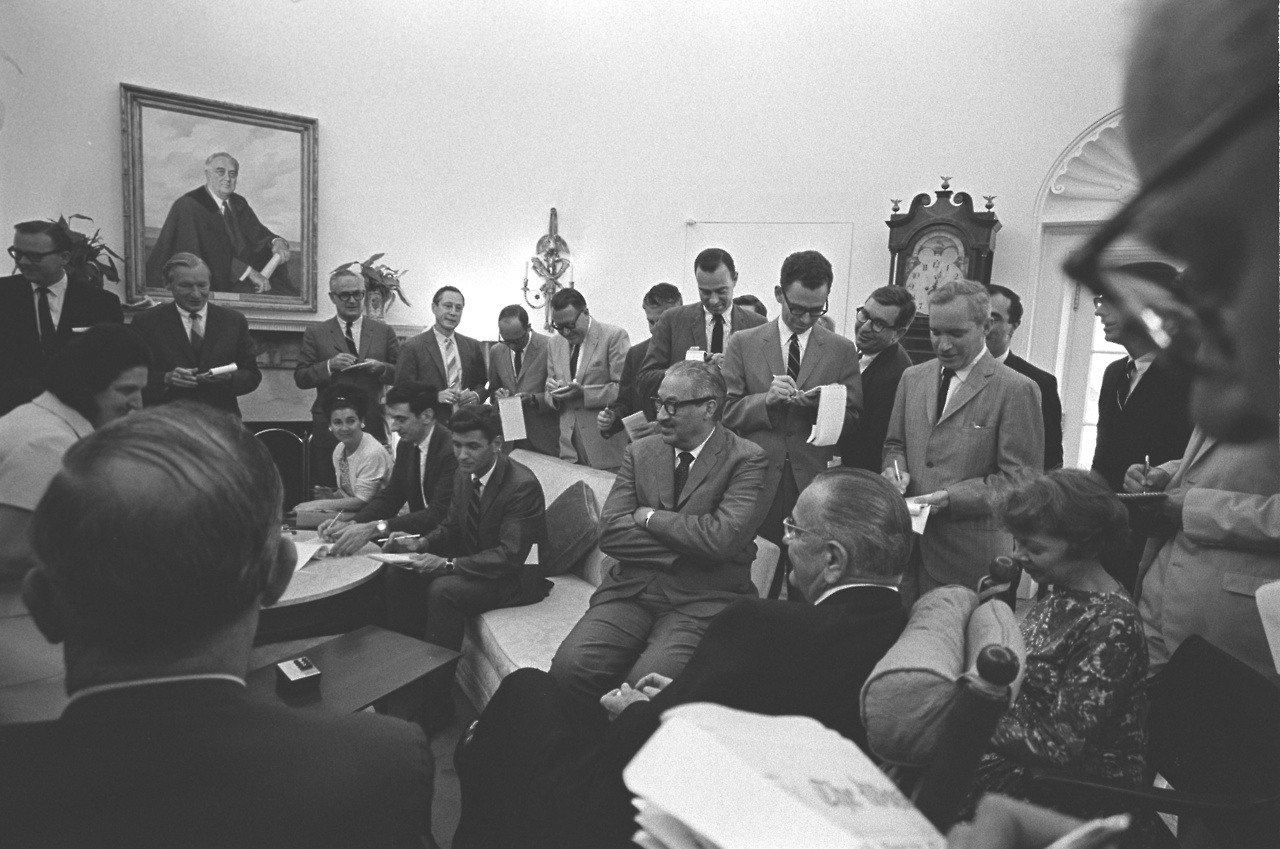
President Johnson, accompanied by Marshall, fields questions from the news media in the Oval Office of the White House after announcing the nomination

Remarks by President Johnson upon announcing the nomination

Johnson announced the nomination in the White House Rose Garden on June 13, 1967, declaring that Marshall "deserves the appointment ... I believe that it is the right thing to do, the right time to do it, the right man and the right place." He also declared that Marshall, "has already earned his place in history, but I think it will be greatly enhanced by his service on the Court.

Johnson announced that the American Bar Association had found Marshall to be "highly acceptable". Attorney General Clark praised Marshall as bringing, "a wealth of legal experience rarely equalled in the history of the Court."

The public received the nomination favorably, and Marshall was praised by prominent senators from both parties. Reaction to the nomination in the press was relatively quiet given the historic nature of the nomination.

== Senate Judiciary Committee review ==
Marshall faced five days of questioning at hearings that were conducted over a several-week period. The hearings were held by the Senate Judiciary Committee on July 13, 14, 18, 19, and 24, 1967. The overall duration of hearings (5 days) was relatively long when compared to the hearings of most previous nominees that testified before the committee.

Opposition to the nomination came from strong segregationists on the Judiciary Committee, all from the Southern United States. James Eastland, Sam Ervin, John L. McClellan, Herman Talmadge, and Strom Thurmond were all in opposition to the nomination. Senator Eastland was the chairman of the Judiciary Committee at the time. These opponents were insistent that their opposition did not arise from Marshall's race. All five of these opponents criticized Marshall's liberal jurisprudence. One of the issues that they prominently used against Marshall was crime, invoking riots that had taken place in cities and capitalizing off of paranoia among many Americans regarding crime. They painted Marshall as prospective justice that might to make decisions that would weaken punishment for criminals. It has been argued that the concerns about crime had racial undertones. Marshall also faced tough quizzing from these opponents on minor historical facts about the Constitution and other matters. For instance, in what Time characterized as a "Yahoo-type hazing", Thurmond asked Marshall over sixty questions about various minor aspects of the history of certain constitutional provisions. Marshall also faced many questions on his constitutional philosophy during his confirmation hearings.

On August 3, 1967, the committee voted 11–5 to report favorably on the nomination. The committee submitted its report to the Senate on August 21, 1968. Its majority opinion declared that Marshall, "demonstrated those qualities which we admire in members of our highest judicial tribunal: thoughtfulness, care, moderation, reasonableness, a judicial temperament, and a balanced approach to controversial and complicated national problems." Minority views were provided by all of the dissenting members of the Committee except Senator Smathers. In presenting his own minority view, Senator Ervin wrote, "it is clearly a disservice to the Constitution and the country to appoint a judicial activist to the Supreme Court at any time."

Senate Judiciary Committee vote
August 3, 1967	Party		Total votes
August 3, 1967	Democratic	Republican	Total votes
Yea	7	4	11
Nay	4	1	5
Result: Passed
Senate Judiciary Committee roll call vote: Senator / Party / State / Vote; Birch Bayh / D / Indiana / Yea; Quentin Burdick / D / North Dakota / Yea; Everett Dirksen / R / Illinois / Yea; Thomas J. Dodd / D / Connecticut / Yea; James Eastland / D / Mississippi / Nay; Sam Ervin / D / North Carolina / Nay; Hiram Fong / R / Hawaii / Yea; Philip Hart / D / Michigan / Yea; Roman Hruska / R / Nebraska / Yea; Ted Kennedy / D / Massachusetts / Yea; Edward Long / D / Missouri / Yea; John L. McClellan / D / Arkansas / Nay; Hugh Scott / R / Pennsylvania / Yea; George Smathers / D / Florida / Nay; Strom Thurmond / R / South Carolina / Nay; Joseph Tydings / D / Maryland / Yea

== Senate confirmation vote ==
Before voting on the nomination on August 30, 1967, the Senate held six hours of debate. Discussion was focused on the character of Marshall. Conservative senators expressed issue with Marshall's liberalism. The Senate voted 69–11 to confirm the nomination. Marshall became the first African American member of the Supreme Court. Afterwards, on September 1, 1967 Justice Hugo Black privately administered the constitutional oath to Marshall, allowing him to be placed on the Supreme Court's payroll. On October 1, 1967, at the start of the Court's new term, Marshall was given the judicial oath and formally joined the Court's bench.

The previous three times that a Democratic Party president had nominated a justice to the Supreme Court, Democratic–controlled Senates had confirmed the nominations within one month by voice vote. However, Marshall's confirmation process lasted a longer period, and the confirmation vote required a roll call vote, despite the Senate being controlled by the Democratic Party.

While Marshall had a healthy majority in his confirmation vote, 69 votes was only several votes above the a two-thirds supermajority needed to overcome a filibuster in a vote had the full Senate participated. In order to give the nomination a healthier chance of surpassing a potential filibuster, Johnson and his administration acted to convince many opponents of the nomination to abstain from casting a vote at all rather than vote against the nomination.

Nine of the ten Democrats that voted against the nomination came from the Deep South, with Robert Byrd being the exception. Byrd, a segregationist who later would recant those views, claimed to oppose the nomination because Marshall's appointment would bring about a "built-in activist majority" on the court in regards to issues such as criminal rights, which he held would be detrimental. Byrd argued that there were political pressures to confirm Marshall because of his race, and that he had actually taken a political risk in opposing Marshall's nomination, declaring,

I consider it my duty as a senator, under the Constitution, not to let Mr. Marshall's race influence my decision. Having reached the definite conclusion that were Mr. Marshall white, I would vote against him. I cannot, therefore, let the fact that he is a Negro influence me to vote for him when I would not do so otherwise.

In his hour and twenty-minute speech against the nomination on the Senate Floor, Senator Sam Ervin declared,

Judge Marshall is, by practice and philosophy, a constitutional iconoclast, and his elevation to the Supreme Court at this juncture in our history would make it virtually certain that for years to come, if not forever, the American people will be ruled by the arbitrary notions of the Supreme Court justices rather than by the precepts of the Constitution.

An eleventh vote against confirmation came from Strom Thurmond, a Southern Republican.

Some critics of the liberal civil rights policies that Marshall had advanced in his work with the NAACP nevertheless voted for the nomination, including Republican John Tower and Democrat J. William Fulbright.

Vote to confirm the Marshall nomination
August 30, 1967	Party		Total votes
August 30, 1967	Democratic	Republican	Total votes
Yea	37	32	69
Nay	10	1	11
Not voting	17	3	20
Result: Confirmed
Roll call vote on the nomination: Senator / Party / State / Vote; George Aiken / R / Vermont / Yea; Gordon Allott / R / Colorado / Yea; Clinton Anderson / D / New Mexico / Yea; Howard Baker / R / Tennessee / Yea; Bob Bartlett / D / Alaska / Yea; Birch Bayh / D / Indiana / Yea; Wallace Bennett / R / Utah / Yea; Alan Bible / D / Nevada / Not voting; J. Caleb Boggs / R / Delaware / Yea; Daniel Brewster / D / Maryland / Yea; Edward Brooke / R / Massachusetts / Yea; Quentin Burdick / D / North Dakota / Yea; Harry F. Byrd Jr. / D / Virginia / Not voting; Robert Byrd / D / West Virginia / Nay; Howard Cannon / D / Nevada / Yea; Frank Carlson / R / Kansas / Yea; Clifford P. Case / R / New Jersey / Yea; Frank Church / D / Idaho / Yea; Joseph S. Clark Jr. / D / Pennsylvania / Yea; John Sherman Cooper / R / Kentucky / Yea; Norris Cotton / R / New Hampshire / Yea; Carl Curtis / R / Nebraska / Yea; Everett Dirksen / R / Illinois / Yea; Thomas J. Dodd / D / Connecticut / Yea; Peter H. Dominick / R / Colorado / Yea; James Eastland / D / Mississippi / Nay; Allen J. Ellender / D / Louisiana / Nay; Sam Ervin / D / North Carolina / Nay; Paul Fannin / R / Arizona / Not voting; Hiram Fong / R / Hawaii / Yea; J. William Fulbright / D / Arkansas / Yea; Albert Gore Sr. / D / Tennessee / Yea; Robert P. Griffin / R / Michigan / Yea; Ernest Gruening / D / Alaska / Not voting; Clifford Hansen / R / Wyoming / Yea; Fred R. Harris / D / Oklahoma / Not voting; Philip Hart / D / Michigan / Yea; Vance Hartke / D / Indiana / Not voting; Mark Hatfield / R / Oregon / Yea; Carl Hayden / D / Arizona / Yea; Bourke B. Hickenlooper / R / Iowa / Not voting; J. Lister Hill / D / Alabama / Nay; Spessard Holland / D / Florida / Nay; Fritz Hollings / D / South Carolina / Nay; Roman Hruska / R / Nebraska / Yea; Daniel Inouye / D / Hawaii / Yea; Henry M. Jackson / D / Washington / Yea; Jacob Javits / R / New York / Yea; B. Everett Jordan / D / North Carolina / Not voting; Len Jordan / R / Idaho / Yea; Robert F. Kennedy / D / New York / Yea; Ted Kennedy / D / Massachusetts / Yea; Thomas Kuchel / R / California / Yea; Frank Lausche / D / Ohio / Yea; Edward Long / D / Missouri / Yea; Russell B. Long / D / Louisiana / Nay; Warren Magnuson / D / Washington / Yea; Mike Mansfield / D / Montana / Not voting; Eugene McCarthy / D / Minnesota / Not voting; John L. McClellan / D / Arkansas / Not voting; Gale W. McGee / D / Wyoming / Yea; George McGovern / D / South Dakota / Not voting; Thomas J. McIntyre / D / New Hampshire / Yea; Lee Metcalf / D / Montana / Not voting; Jack Miller / R / Iowa / Yea; Walter Mondale / D / Minnesota / Yea; Mike Monroney / D / Oklahoma / Yea; Joseph Montoya / D / New Mexico / Not voting; Wayne Morse / D / Oregon / Yea; Thruston Ballard Morton / R / Kentucky / Yea; Frank Moss / D / Utah / Yea; Karl Mundt / R / South Dakota / Yea; George Murphy / R / California / Not voting; Edmund Muskie / D / Maine / Not voting; Gaylord Nelson / D / Wisconsin / Not voting; John Pastore / D / Rhode Island / Yea; James B. Pearson / R / Kansas / Yea; Claiborne Pell / D / Rhode Island / Yea; Charles H. Percy / R / Illinois / Yea; Winston L. Prouty / R / Vermont / Yea; William Proxmire / D / Wisconsin / Yea; Jennings Randolph / D / West Virginia / Yea; Abraham Ribicoff / D / Connecticut / Yea; Richard Russell Jr. / D / Georgia / Not voting; Hugh Scott / R / Pennsylvania / Yea; George Smathers / D / Florida / Not voting; Margaret Chase Smith / R / Maine / Yea; John Sparkman / D / Alabama / Nay; William Spong Jr. / D / Virginia / Yea; John C. Stennis / D / Mississippi / Not voting; Stuart Symington / D / Missouri / Yea; Herman Talmadge / D / Georgia / Nay; Strom Thurmond / R / South Carolina / Nay; John Tower / R / Texas / Yea; Joseph Tydings / D / Maryland / Yea; Harrison A. Williams / D / New Jersey / Yea; John James Williams / R / Delaware / Yea; Ralph Yarborough / D / Texas / Yea; Milton Young / R / North Dakota / Yea; Stephen M. Young / D / Ohio / Yea

== See also ==
- List of federal judges appointed by Lyndon B. Johnson
- Lyndon B. Johnson Supreme Court candidates
- List of nominations to the Supreme Court of the United States
