= 1960 United States Senate election in Maine =

- November 8, 1960
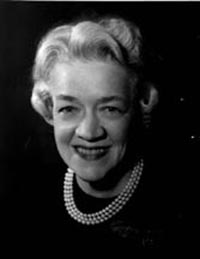

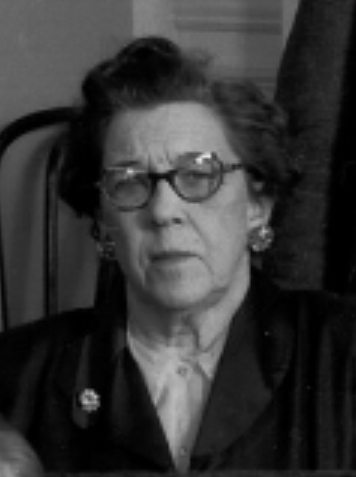
| Nominee | Margaret Chase Smith | Lucia Cormier |
| Party | Republican | Democratic |
| Popular vote | 256,890 | 159,809 |
| Percentage | 61.65% | 38.35% |
- Smith: 50–60% 60–70% 70–80% 80–90% >90% Cormier: 50–60% 60–70% 70–80% 80–90% >90% Tie: 50%
U.S. senator before election
Margaret Chase Smith
Republican
Elected U.S. Senator
Margaret Chase Smith
Republican

The 1960 United States Senate election in Maine was held on November 8, 1960. Incumbent Republican U.S. Senator Margaret Chase Smith was re-elected to a third term over Democratic State Representative Lucia Cormier, the floor leader of the Maine House of Representatives.

This was the first election in United States Senate history in which the major-party nominees were both women, a fact that drew national and international press attention to what several newspapers dubbed the "Petticoat Race." It was also the first U.S. Senate election in Maine held in November rather than September, following a 1957 amendment to the Constitution of Maine that moved the state's general elections to align with the rest of the country.

== Background ==
Smith, a moderate Republican, had first entered elective office in a 1940 special election, winning the House seat of her late husband, Representative Clyde H. Smith, for whom she had worked as a secretary and speechwriter. She won election to the Senate in 1948, defeating three opponents in the Republican primary to become the first woman elected to both chambers of Congress, and was reelected easily in 1954. By 1960 she was best known nationally for her 1950 "Declaration of Conscience" speech condemning Joseph McCarthy's anti-communist tactics, and for a near-perfect record of attendance on Senate roll-call votes that she was determined to protect throughout the campaign. Political observers considered her heavily favored for a third term.

Maine's junior senator, Democrat Edmund Muskie, who had a famously strained relationship with Smith, argued that the only way Democrats could realistically defeat her was to run a woman against her, reasoning that a male challenger would struggle to attack Smith's record without appearing ungallant. Muskie recruited Cormier, a former modern-language teacher and the owner of a gift and stationery shop in Rumford, who had served multiple terms in the Maine House beginning in 1946, run unsuccessfully for Maine's 1st congressional district in 1950, and risen by 1959 to become the first woman to serve as the House's minority floor leader. Smith and Cormier had known each other for years through the National Federation of Business and Professional Women's Clubs and, despite their party rivalry, both were determined to run substantive campaigns rather than a novelty contest. Cormier's nomination coincided with the presidential candidacy of fellow New Englander and Roman Catholic John F. Kennedy, who led the Democratic ticket in Maine that November.

== Campaign ==
=== Media coverage ===
National press coverage of the race frequently reduced both candidates to gendered stock characters, casting the contest as a battle between a "widow" and a "spinster" and predicting a "fur-flying political cat fight" between a "scrappy" challenger and the incumbent "queen bee." Some commentators speculated about "hair-pulling" and openly urged Cormier to "slug it out" with Smith on the campaign trail. Both candidates largely declined to engage on those terms; Smith later recalled that the campaign had been "ladylike" but not "powder puff."

In February 1960, months before the general election, Muskie personally escorted Cormier onto the floor of the Senate chamber, introduced her to colleagues as "the next senator from Maine," and urged her to sit at one of the chamber's historic desks — a breach of Senate custom that Smith and others considered presumptuous, and which generated a burst of national press attention for the still-undeclared race.

=== Campaign styles ===
Cormier campaigned through extensive retail politicking, making informal appearances at factories, village greens, and city streets across the state rather than relying heavily on paid advertising; she toured mills and plants such as the St. Regis Paper Company facility in Bucksport, Maine, greeting workers with a handshake and a brief self-introduction. Smith, by contrast, ran a comparatively low-key campaign centered on her Senate record, summed up in her recurring appeal to voters not to "trade a record for a promise." She spent relatively little time or money campaigning in the state and continued to prioritize her Senate voting attendance; when Vice President Richard Nixon, the Republican presidential nominee, visited Maine that fall at her invitation, Smith declined his request that she leave Washington to campaign with him rather than risk missing a roll-call vote.

Two days before the election, Smith and Cormier met in a statewide televised debate, one of the first televised U.S. Senate debates; both candidates again avoided direct personal attacks.

== Republican primary ==
=== Candidates ===
- Margaret Chase Smith, U.S. Senator since 1949

=== Results ===
Senator Smith was unopposed for renomination

1960 Maine Republican U.S. Senate primary
| Party | Candidate | Votes | % |
|---|---|---|---|
| Republican | Margaret Chase Smith (inc.) | 67,765 | 100.00% |
| Total votes | | 67,765 | 100.00% |

== Democratic primary ==
=== Candidates ===
- Lucia Cormier, State Representative from Rumford

=== Results ===
Representative Cormier was unopposed for the Democratic nomination.

1960 Democratic U.S. Senate primary
| Party | Candidate | Votes | % |
|---|---|---|---|
| Democratic | Lucia Cormier | 27,789 | 100.00% |
| Total votes | | 27,789 | 100.00% |

== General election ==
=== Results ===
1960 U.S. Senate election in Maine
| Party | Candidate | Votes | % | ±% |
|---|---|---|---|---|
| Republican | Margaret Chase Smith (incumbent) | 256,890 | 61.65% | ▲3.04 |
| Democratic | Lucia Cormier | 159,809 | 38.35% | ▼3.04 |
| Total votes | | 416,699 | 100.00% | |

== Aftermath ==
Smith's 61.65% share of the vote was the highest winning percentage of any Republican senator elected that year. Cormier ran roughly 20,000 votes behind Kennedy, who narrowly lost Maine to Nixon in the concurrent presidential election. Smith went on to serve two additional terms in the Senate, running for the Republican presidential nomination in 1964 before losing her Senate seat in 1972 to Democrat William Hathaway. Cormier did not seek elected office again; President Kennedy later appointed her Collector of Customs for the Port of Portland, and she went on to serve as a Maine delegate to the Democratic National Committee.

The 1960 race is often cited alongside the 1944 Connecticut House race between Clare Boothe Luce and Margaret Connors — the first U.S. House race with major-party women nominees — as an early instance of women-versus-women congressional contests in which sexist press coverage overshadowed substantive policy debate between the candidates.

== See also ==
- 1960 United States Senate elections
- Clare Boothe Luce
