= List of covers of Time magazine (1960s) =

This is a list of people and other topics appearing on the cover of Time magazine in the 1960s. Time was first published in 1923. As Time became established as one of the United States' leading news magazines, an appearance on the cover of Time became an indicator of notability, fame or notoriety. Such features were accompanied by articles.

Between 1961 and 1969, all of the dates had been issued on Friday instead of Monday scheduled time frame.

For other decades, see Lists of covers of Time magazine.

== 1960 ==
- January 4 – Dwight D. Eisenhower, Man of the Year
- January 11 – Population Explosion
- January 18 – U.S. Commuters
- January 25 – Nobusuke Kishi
- February 1 – Hubert H. Humphrey
- February 8 – Rómulo Betancourt
- February 15 – James Reston
- February 22 – Pete Quesada
- February 29 – Pat Nixon
- March 7 – Tom Mboya
- March 14 – Ingmar Bergman
- March 21 – Caryl Chessman
- March 28 – Jacques Cousteau
- April 4 – Robert Menzies
- April 11 – Bowman Gray Jr.
- April 18 – St. Paul by Lippo Memmi
- April 25 – Lyndon B. Johnson
- May 2 – Arnold Palmer
- May 9 – John H. Loudon
- May 16 – Francis Gary Powers
- May 23 – Dwight D. Eisenhower, Harold Macmillan, Charles de Gaulle & Nikita Khrushchev
- May 30 – Rodion Malinovsky
- June 6 – U.S. Satellites
- June 13 – Nikita Khrushchev
- June 20 – Suburban Wife
- June 27 – Douglas MacArthur II
- July 4 – William Shakespeare
- July 11 – Joseph P. Kennedy Sr., Rose Kennedy, Jacqueline Kennedy & John F. Kennedy
- July 18 – Lyndon B. Johnson
- July 25 – Sherman Fairchild
- August 1 – Nelson Rockefeller & Richard Nixon
- August 8 – Che Guevara
- August 15 – Mort Sahl
- August 22 – Dag Hammarskjöld
- August 29 – Rafer Johnson
- September 5 – Margaret Chase Smith & Lucia M. Cormier
- September 12 – Shah of Iran
- September 19 – New Products
- September 26 – Henry Cabot Lodge
- October 3 – Cartoon by Herblock depicting Nikita Khrushchev, Fidel Castro, Gheorghe Gheorghiu-Dej, Todor Zhivkov, Antonín Novotný, János Kádár, Mehmet Shehu, Valerian Zorin & Josip Broz Tito
- October 10 – Robert F. Kennedy
- October 17 – Clark Kerr
- October 24 – Paul Bagwell
- October 31 – Richard Nixon
- November 7 – John F. Kennedy
- November 14 – Alan Jay Lerner & Frederick Loewe
- November 16 – John F. Kennedy
- November 21 – Hong Kong
- November 28 – Sylvia Porter
- December 5 – Abubakar Balewa
- December 12 – John Courtney Murray
- December 19 – Franz Josef Strauss
- December 26 – Dean Rusk

== 1961 ==
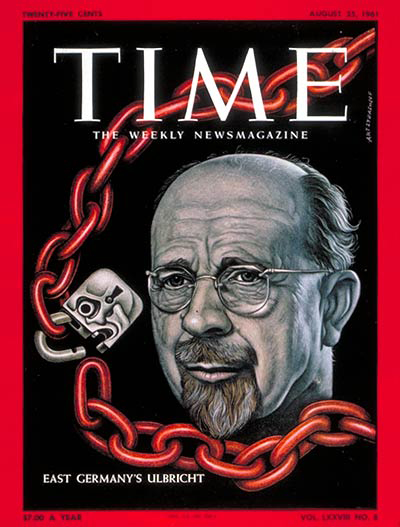
Cover for August 25, with Walter Ulbricht

- January 2 – U.S. Scientists (represented by George Beadle, Charles Draper, John Enders, Donald A. Glaser, Joshua Lederberg, Willard Libby, Linus Pauling, Edward Purcell, Isidor Rabi, Emilio Segrè, William Shockley, Edward Teller, Charles Townes, James Van Allen, and Robert Woodward), Men of the Year
- January 6 – Harry Felt
- January 13 – Ancel Keys
- January 20 – Jacqueline Kennedy
- January 27 – Kennedy Inauguration
- February 3 – John R. McKone & Bruce Olmstead
- February 10 – Samuel T. Rayburn
- February 17 – Oscar Robertson
- February 24 – Valerian Zorin
- March 3 – Walter W. Heller
- March 10 – Leontyne Price
- March 17 – Savang Vatthana
- March 24 – James M. Moran
- March 31 – Guilt and Anxiety (The Scream by Edvard Munch)
- April 7 – Robert S. McNamara
- April 14 – Jean Kerr
- April 21 – Yuri Gagarin
- April 28 – Jose Miro Cardona
- May 5 – Le Corbusier
- May 12 – Alan Shepard
- May 19 – The Faraway Places
- May 26 – Eugene Carson Blake
- June 2 – John Patterson
- June 9 – John F. Kennedy
- June 16 – Clint & John Murchison
- June 23 – Barry Goldwater
- June 30 – Jânio Quadros
- July 7 – Leonard Larson
- July 14 – Camping: Call of the Not So Wild
- July 21 – Bill Mauldin
- July 28 – Maxwell Taylor
- August 4 – Ngo Dinh Diem
- August 11 – Donald J.M. Russell
- August 18 – C. Douglas Dillon
- August 25 – Walter Ulbricht (Construction of the Berlin Wall)
- September 1 – Lawrence F. O'Brien
- September 8 – Nikita Khrushchev
- September 15 – J. D. Salinger
- September 22 – Arthur J. Goldberg
- September 29 – Mongi Slim
- October 6 – Jean Monnet
- October 13 – Creighton Abrams
- October 20 – Virgil Couch
- October 27 – Thomas V. Jones
- November 3 – Mary Bunting
- November 10 – Glenn T. Seaborg
- November 17 – John F. Enders
- November 24 – Rembrandt's Aristotle Contemplating a Bust of Homer
- December 1 – Li Fu-chun
- December 8 – Willem Visser't Hooft
- December 15 – Christmas Shopping
- December 22 – Moise Tshombe
- December 29 – Jackie Gleason

== 1962 ==
- January 5 – John F. Kennedy, Man of the Year
- January 12 – John K. Galbraith, George F. Kennan and Edwin O. Reischauer
- January 19 – John W. McCormack
- January 26 – Raoul Salan
- February 2 – V. K. Krishna Menon
- February 9 – Theodore Hesburgh
- February 16 – Robert F. Kennedy
- February 23 – Konosuke Matsushita
- March 2 – John Glenn
- March 9 – Tennessee Williams
- March 16 – Benyoucef Benkhedda
- March 23 – John F. Collins, Lewis W. Cutrer, Richard J. Daley, Robert F. Wagner Jr. & Sam Yorty
- March 30 – Arturo Frondizi
- April 6 – Sophia Loren
- April 13 – Yevgeny Yevtushenko
- April 20 – Karl Barth
- April 27 – Blas Roca
- May 4 – William E. Ogle
- May 11 – Paul D. Harkins
- May 18 – Frederic G. Donner
- May 25 – Billie Sol Estes
- June 1 – Bear vs. Bull on Wall Street
- June 8 – Walter W. Heller
- June 15 – Nelson Rockefeller
- June 22 – Don Juan
- June 29 – Jack Nicklaus
- July 6 – Eugene Ferkauf
- July 13 – Edward R. Heath
- July 20 – Lucy Douglas Cochrane
- July 27 – Samuel Irving Newhouse Sr.
- August 3 – Del Webb
- August 10 – D. Brainerd Holmes
- August 17 – Harry F. Byrd
- August 24 – Andriyan Nikolayev & Pavel Popovich
- August 31 – The Wall
- September 7 – David Rockefeller
- September 14 – Everett Dirksen
- September 21 – James Monroe
- September 28 – Edward Kennedy
- October 5 – Pope John XXIII
- October 12 – U.S. Advertising Executives Norman Hulbert Strouse, Fairfax M. Cone, Charles H. Brower, Harry Albert Batten, Leo Burnett, David Ogilvy, Marion Harper Jr., George Homer Gribbin, John Philip Cunningham, Robert Emmett Lusk, Henry Guy Little & Robert Mondell Ganger
- October 19 – William Scranton
- October 26 – John M. Kemper
- November 2 – George W. Anderson Jr.
- November 9 – Nikita Khrushchev
- November 16 – George W. Romney
- November 23 – Joan Baez
- November 30 – Jawaharlal Nehru
- December 7 – Charles de Gaulle
- December 14 – Adlai Stevenson II
- December 21 – Vince Lombardi
- December 28 – Lynn A. Townsend

== 1963 ==
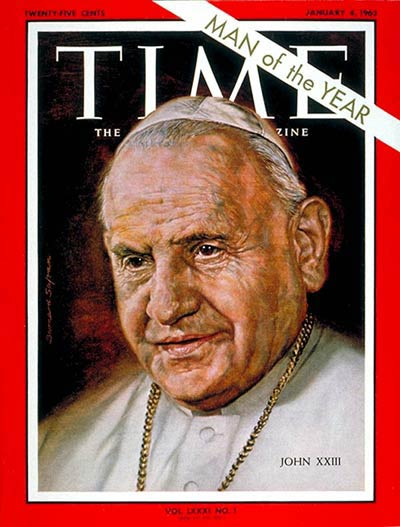
Cover for January 4, with Pope John XXIII. This is the most recent Time issue in the public domain.

- January 4 – Pope John XXIII, Man of the Year
- January 11 – Wilbur Mills
- January 18 – Minoru Yamasaki
- January 25 – Great Britain
- February 1 – Mortimer Caplin
- February 8 – Charles de Gaulle
- February 15 – Robert McNamara
- February 22 – George Szell
- March 1 – Bertram A. Powers
- March 8 – William H. Pickering
- March 15 – Richard J. Daley
- March 22 – Muhammad Ali
- March 29 – Gamal Abdel Nasser
- April 5 – Orville Freeman
- April 12 – Tunku Abdul Rahman
- April 19 – Lester B. Pearson
- April 26 – Richard Burton
- May 3 – Francis Daniels Moore
- May 10 – Abraham Lincoln
- May 17 – James Baldwin
- May 24 – Gordon Cooper
- May 31 – 12 Top U.S. Executives (Oil: Rathbone, Steel: Block, Stocks: McCarthy, Manufactures: Cresap, Banking: Peterson, Insurance: Fitzhugh, Airlines: Patterson, Autos: Gordon, Electronics: Thornton, Chemicals: Copeland, Aerospace: Gross & Retail: Lazarus)
- June 7 – Pope John XXIII
- June 14 – Barry Goldwater
- June 21 – Robert F. Kennedy & John F. Kennedy
- June 28 – Pope Paul VI (Conclave)
- July 5 – Sargent Shriver
- July 12 – Seán Lemass
- July 19 – Conrad Hilton
- July 26 – H. Edward Gilbert
- August 2 – W. Averell Harriman
- August 9 – Madame Nhu
- August 16 – Michael Ramsey
- August 23 – U.S. Atomic Arsenal
- August 30 – Roy Wilkins
- September 6 – William L. Pereira
- September 13 – Red China with caricatures of Mao Zedong, Deng Xiaoping, Liu Shaoqi & Zhou Enlai
- September 20 – International Cinema (Zygmunt Malanowicz & Jolanta Umecka, a still from the film Knife in the Water)
- September 27 – George Wallace
- October 4 – Tex Thornton
- October 11 – Harold Wilson
- October 18 – Roger Staubach
- October 25 – Alec Douglas-Home
- November 1 – Ludwig Erhard
- November 8 – Dương Văn Minh
- November 15 – Calvin E. Gross
- November 22 – Nicole Alphand
- November 29 – Lyndon B. Johnson (Kennedy's assassination, Johnson's inauguration)
- December 6 – Dean Rusk
- December 13 – Nelson Glueck
- December 20 – Guy de Rothschild
- December 27 – Andrew Wyeth

== 1964 ==
- January 3 – Martin Luther King Jr., Man of the Year
- January 10 – Buckminster Fuller
- January 17 – John Connally
- January 24 – Sex in the U.S.
- January 31 – Thomas C. Mann
- February 7 – Maurice Couve de Murville
- February 14 – Marina Oswald
- February 21 – Leonid Brezhnev
- February 28 – Thelonious Monk
- March 6 – Bobby Baker
- March 13 – Julius Nyerere
- March 20 – Mike Mansfield
- March 27 – John Cheever
- April 3 – Norodom Sihanouk
- April 10 – Barbra Streisand
- April 17 – Lee Iacocca
- April 24 – Vladimir Lenin
- May 1 – Lyndon B. Johnson
- May 8 – Gerald H. Kennedy
- May 15 – Henry Cabot Lodge Jr.
- May 22 – Nelson Rockefeller
- May 29 – Frederick Kappel
- June 5 – New York World's Fair, Robert Moses
- June 12 – Barry Goldwater
- June 19 – Everett Dirksen
- June 26 – Kong Le
- July 3 – Princess Anne-Marie of Denmark
- July 10 – Everett Dirksen & Barry Goldwater
- July 17 – William Faulkner
- July 24 – Barry Goldwater
- July 31 – Harlem
- August 7 – Nguyễn Khánh
- August 14 – U. S. Grant Sharp Jr.
- August 21 – Richard Cushing
- August 28 – Lady Bird Johnson
- September 4 – Hubert Humphrey & Lyndon B. Johnson
- September 11 – Hank Bauer
- September 18 – Charles H. Percy
- September 25 – The Nuclear Issue
- October 2 – Lee Harvey Oswald
- October 9 – Hugo Black
- October 16 – Pierre Salinger
- October 23 – Leonid Brezhnev, Lyndon B. Johnson, Alexei Kosygin & Harold Wilson
- October 30 – Kenneth Keating
- November 4 – Lyndon B. Johnson
- November 6 – Edmund N. Bacon
- November 13 – Zhou Enlai & Alexei Kosygin
- November 20 – Ara Parseghian
- November 27 – Lammot Copeland
- December 4 – Paul Carlson
- December 11 – Buddhism
- December 18 – Dorothy Buffum Chandler
- December 25 – Christian Renewal

== 1965 ==
- January 1 – Lyndon B. Johnson, Man of the Year
- January 8 – Jack Isidor Straus
- January 15 – Carl Albert
- January 22 – J. William Fulbright
- January 29 – Today's Teenagers
- February 5 – The Joint Chiefs (David L. McDonald, John P. McConnell, Earle Wheeler, Wallace M. Greene & Harold K. Johnson)
- February 12 – Evsei Liberman
- February 19 – William Westmoreland
- February 26 – Chen Yi
- March 5 – Jeanne Moreau
- March 12 – Fernando Belaúnde Terry
- March 19 – Martin Luther King Jr.
- March 26 – Alexei Leonov
- April 2 – Computer in Society
- April 9 – The World According to Peanuts
- April 16 – Rudolf Nureyev
- April 23 – James Robinson Risner
- April 30 – Harold Wilson
- May 7 – Elias Wessin y Wessin
- May 14 – The Communications Explosion
- May 21 – Rock 'n' Roll
- May 28 – Michael E. DeBakey
- June 4 – Norton Simon
- June 11 – Ed White & James McDivitt
- June 18 – Phyllis McGinley
- June 25 – McGeorge Bundy
- July 2 – A woman (Michael Anderson) at the beach
- July 9 – Jim Clark
- July 16 – Ho Chi Minh
- July 23 – William Pickering
- July 30 – Marc Chagall
- August 6 – Lyndon B. Johnson
- August 13 – Lal Bahadur Shastri
- August 20 – The Los Angeles Riot
- August 27 – Chris Kraft
- September 3 – Charles B. Shuman
- September 10 – Henry H. Fowler
- September 17 – Ayub Khan & Lal Bahadur Shastri
- September 24 – Pope Paul VI
- October 1 – Water
- October 8 – Fidel Castro
- October 15 – Francis Keppel
- October 22 – Vietnam War
- October 29 – Bill Moyers
- November 5 – Ian Smith
- November 12 – John V. Lindsay
- November 19 – The Biggest Blackout
- November 26 – Jim Brown
- December 3 – Millionaires Under 40 (Merlyn Mickelson, Harold Prince, Arthur Decio, Charles Bluhdorn, John Diebold & Arthur Carlsberg)
- December 10 – Harold Keith Johnson
- December 17 – Arthur M. Schlesinger Jr.
- December 24 – Gemini 6A & Gemini 7 Rendezvous
- December 31 – John Maynard Keynes

== 1966 ==
- January 7 – William Westmoreland, Man of the Year
- January 14 – U.S. Peace Offensive (Lyndon B. Johnson & advisers; Alexander Shelepin & Ho Chi Minh)
- January 21 – Francisco Franco
- January 28 – Indira Gandhi
- February 4 – Dean Rusk
- February 11 – Courtlandt S. Gross
- February 18 – Nguyễn Cao Kỳ
- February 25 – Arthur Rubinstein
- March 4 – Robert C. Weaver
- March 11 – Maarten Schmidt
- March 18 – Nicolae Ceaușescu
- March 25 – David Merrick
- April 1 – Hubert H. Humphrey
- April 8 – Is God Dead?
- April 15 – London
- April 22 – Thích Trí Quang
- April 29 – Danny Escobedo
- May 6 – Great College Teachers (George Wald, Dwight Miner, Frederic Bohnenblust, Osborne Bennett Hardison Jr., Martin Diamond, Arnold Arons, Abraham Kaplan, Carl Emil Schorske, Vincent Scully & Anthony Athos)
- May 13 – Sargent Shriver
- May 20 – James M. Roche
- May 27 – King Bhumibol & Queen Sirikit
- June 3 – Gary Wilson
- June 10 – Juan Marichal
- June 17 – Võ Nguyên Giáp
- June 24 – Jacob Javits
- July 1 – Charles de Gaulle
- July 8 – Robert McNamara
- July 15 – Suharto
- July 22 – Charles C. Tillinghast Jr.
- July 29 – Lauren Bacall
- August 5 – Luci B. Johnson & Patrick Nugent
- August 12 – Charles Whitman
- August 19 – James E. Thomson
- August 26 – Hendrik Verwoerd
- September 2 – Sam Yorty
- September 9 – Lin Piao
- September 16 – Robert F. Kennedy
- September 23 – Rudolf Bing
- September 30 – William A. C. Bennett
- October 7 – Ronald Reagan
- October 14 – Walter Cronkite
- October 21 – Ferdinand Marcos
- October 28 – Jim Seymour & Terry Hanratty
- November 4 – Lyndon B. Johnson
- November 11 – James Pike
- November 18 – Republican Winners (Ronald Reagan, George W. Romney, Charles H. Percy, Mark Hatfield, Edward Brooke & Nelson Rockefeller)
- November 25 – Julia Child
- December 2 – Winthrop Rockefeller
- December 9 – Kurt Georg Kiesinger
- December 16 – Bennett Cerf
- December 23 – Julie Andrews
- December 30 – Rudolph A. Peterson

== 1967 ==
- January 6 – Twenty-Five & Under, Man of the Year
- January 13 – Mao Tse-tung
- January 20 – John W. Gardner
- January 27 – Polluted Air
- February 3 – Roger Chaffee, Gus Grissom & Ed White
- February 10 – Eisaku Satō
- February 17 – Edward Brooke
- February 24 – Richard Helms
- March 3 – Hugh Hefner
- March 10 – Henry R. Luce
- March 17 – Lynn & Vanessa Redgrave
- March 24 – Martin Luther
- March 31 – James S. McDonnell
- April 7 – The Pill
- April 14 – 1968 Candidates cartoon by Paul Conrad depicting Lyndon B. Johnson, Robert F. Kennedy, Hubert Humphrey, Richard Nixon, Charles H. Percy, Nelson Rockefeller, Ronald Reagan & George W. Romney
- April 21 – Costa e Silva
- April 28 – Constantine II of Greece
- May 5 – William Westmoreland
- May 12 – Frank Minis Johnson
- May 19 – Johnny Carson
- May 26 – Clide Brown Jr.
- June 2 – Robert Lowell
- June 9 – Levi Eshkol
- June 16 – Moshe Dayan
- June 23 – Kingman Brewster Jr.
- June 30 – Lyndon B. Johnson & Alexei Kosygin
- July 7 – The Hippies
- July 14 – King Hussein
- July 21 – John William Smith
- July 28 – Pat Moynihan
- August 4 – Detroit Race Riots
- August 11 – Whitney M. Young Jr.
- August 18 – Bus Mosbacher
- August 25 – Inside the Viet Cong
- September 1 – Sandy Dennis
- September 8 – Harold S. Geneen
- September 15 – Nguyễn Văn Thiệu
- September 22 – The Beatles
- September 29 – An Interracial Wedding (Guy Gibson Smith & Margaret Elizabeth Rusk)
- October 6 – Marines at Con Thien
- October 13 – Tony Smith
- October 20 – Ronald Reagan & Nelson Rockefeller
- October 27 – Peace Marchers
- November 3 – William F. Buckley Jr.
- November 10 – Alexei Kosygin, Nikita Khrushchev, Vladimir Lenin & Joseph Stalin
- November 17 – Carl Stokes
- November 24 – Harold Wilson
- December 1 – Rudi Gernreich
- December 8 – Bonnie and Clyde (Warren Beatty and Faye Dunaway)
- December 15 – Christiaan Barnard
- December 22 – Bob Hope
- December 29 – Michael Haider

== 1968 ==
- January 5 – Lyndon B. Johnson, Man of the Year
- January 12 – Samuel B. Gould
- January 19 – Zubin Mehta
- January 26 – Stuart Saunders
- February 2 – Lloyd Bucher
- February 9 – Võ Nguyên Giáp
- February 16 – John K. Galbraith
- February 23 – Sergei Gorshkov
- March 1 – Bobby Hull
- March 8 – Richard Nixon & Nelson Rockefeller
- March 15 – Joffrey Ballet's 'Astarte'
- March 22 – Eugene McCarthy
- March 29 – Pierre-Paul Schweitzer
- April 5 – Alexander Dubček
- April 12 – Lyndon B. Johnson
- April 19 – Creighton Abrams
- April 26 – John Updike
- May 3 – Hubert H. Humphrey
- May 10 – Mai Văn Bộ, W. Averell Harriman, Xuân Thủy & Cyrus Vance
- May 17 – Poverty in America
- May 24 – Robert F. Kennedy
- May 31 – Charles de Gaulle
- June 7 – The Graduate 1968
- June 14 – Robert F. Kennedy (assassination)
- June 21 – The Gun in America
- June 28 – Aretha Franklin
- July 5 – Abe Fortas
- July 12 – TV Commercials
- July 19 – Tom Reddin
- July 26 – Eugene McCarthy & Nelson Rockefeller
- August 2 – Nathaniel Alexander Owings
- August 9 – Daniel J. Evans
- August 16 – Spiro Agnew & Richard Nixon
- August 23 – C. Odumegwu Ojukwu
- August 30 – Russian Invasion of Czechoslovakia
- September 6 – Hubert H. Humphrey & Edmund Muskie
- September 13 – Denny McLain
- September 20 – Spiro Agnew
- September 27 – Alexander Solzhenitsyn
- October 4 – Law and Order
- October 11 – Dick Martin & Dan Rowan
- October 18 – Curtis LeMay & George Wallace
- October 25 – Aristotle Onassis & Jacqueline Kennedy
- November 1 – John Lindsay
- November 8 – Lyndon B. Johnson
- November 15 – Richard Nixon
- November 22 – Pope Paul VI
- November 29 – Charles de Gaulle
- December 6 – Race for the Moon
- December 13 – Yasser Arafat
- December 20 – William P. Rogers
- December 27 – Johann Sebastian Bach

== 1969 ==
- January 3 – William A. Anders, Frank Borman & Jim Lovell, Men of the Year
- January 10 – Edward Kennedy
- January 17 – Giovanni Agnelli
- January 24 – Richard Nixon
- January 31 – Black v. Jew
- February 7 – Mia Farrow & Dustin Hoffman (John and Mary)
- February 14 – Henry Kissinger
- February 21 – U.S. Medicine
- February 28 – Richard Nixon
- March 7 – Charles Bluhdorn, James Ling & George William Miller
- March 14 – Great Missile Debate
- March 21 – Carroll Righter
- March 28 – Nguyễn Văn Thiệu
- April 4 – Dwight D. Eisenhower
- April 11 – Military Under Attack
- April 18 – Rage and Reform on Campus (Statue of John Harvard)
- April 25 – Ethel Kennedy
- May 2 – Robert H. Finch
- May 9 – Georges Pompidou
- May 16 – Gamal Abdel Nasser
- May 23 – Vladimir Nabokov
- May 30 – Warren E. Burger
- June 6 – Temple Fielding
- June 13 – Leonid Brezhnev, Fidel Castro, Nicolae Ceaușescu, Josip Broz Tito & Mao Zedong
- June 20 – Troop Withdrawal
- June 27 – Prince Charles (Investiture)
- July 4 – Cesar Chavez
- July 11 – The Sex Explosion
- July 18 – Lunar Exploration
- July 25 – Neil Armstrong (Apollo 11)
- August 1 – Edward Kennedy (Chappaquiddick incident)
- August 8 – John Wayne
- August 15 – The Nixon Presidency
- August 22 – The Mafia
- August 29 – Melvin Laird
- September 5 – New York Mets
- September 12 – Ho Chi Minh
- September 19 – Golda Meir
- September 26 – Drugs and the Young
- October 3 – Mario Procaccino
- October 10 – Willy Brandt
- October 17 – Vietnam Moratorium
- October 24 – Richard Nixon & Vietnam
- October 31 – The Homosexual
- November 7 – California
- November 14 – Spiro Agnew
- November 21 – Spiro Agnew, Richard Nixon, Dean Burch, Walter Cronkite, Chet Huntley, David Brinkley & J. Sargeant Reynolds
- November 28 – Raquel Welch
- December 5 – William Calley
- December 12 – Ralph Nader
- December 19 – Milton Friedman
- December 26 – Is God Coming Back to Life?

Previous	Lists of covers of Time magazine	Next
1950s	1960s	1970s
