= Marguerite R. Fay =

American politician

- Born: Marguerite R. Fay
- Died: July 9, 1962
- Occupation: State Legislator (1949-1952)

Marguerite R. Fay (died July 9, 1962) was an American politician from Maine. A Republican, Longstaff represented Portland, Maine in the Maine House of Representatives from 1949 to 1952 (94th-95th Legislatures). During the 94th Legislature, Fay was one of three women elected to the House of Representatives. Marion L. Longstaff and Lucia M. Cormier were the others.
