= Marion L. Longstaff =

American politician

- Born: Marion L. Longstaff; 11 March 1904
- Died: February 29, 1984 (aged 79)
- Occupation: State Legislator (1943-1950)

Marion L. Longstaff (March 11, 1904 – February 29, 1984) was an American politician from Maine. A Republican, Longstaff represented Crystal, Aroostook County, Maine in the Maine House of Representatives from 1943 to 1950 (91st-94th Legislatures). During the 94th Legislature, Longstaff was one of three women elected to the House of Representatives. Marguerite R. Fay and Lucia M. Cormier were the others.
