= Roland Martin =

Roland Martin may refer to:

- Roland Martin (fisherman), host of American fishing show on TV channel Versus
- Roland Martin (journalist) (born 1968), American author and syndicated columnist
- Roland Martin (archaeologist) (1912–1997), French archaeologist
- Danny Martin (politician), (born 1949), former member of the Maine House of Representatives, given name is Roland Martin
