= 1954 United States Senate election in Maine =

- September 13, 1954
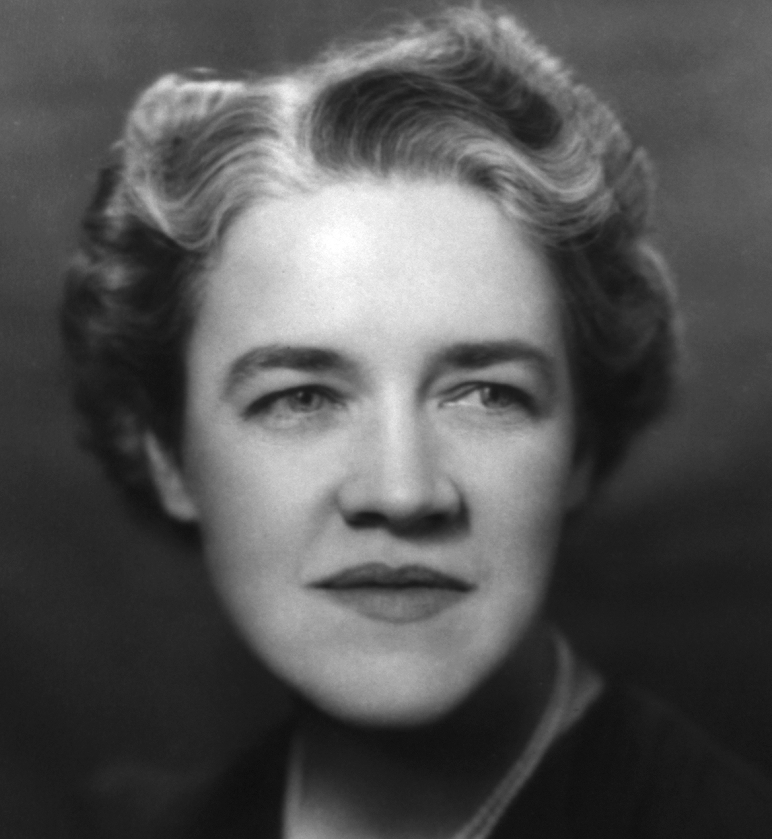

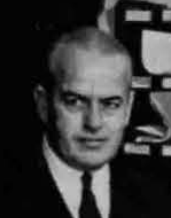
Nominee	Margaret Chase Smith	Paul Fullam
Party	Republican	Democratic
Popular vote	144,530	102,075
Percentage	58.61%	41.39%
- County results Smith: 50–60% 60–70% 70–80% Fullam: 50–60%
U.S. senator before election
Margaret Chase Smith
Republican
Elected U.S. Senator
Margaret Chase Smith
Republican

The 1954 United States Senate election in Maine was held on September 13, 1954. Incumbent Republican U.S. Senator Margaret Chase Smith was re-elected to a second term over Democrat Paul Fullam.

== Republican primary ==
=== Candidates ===
- Robert L. Jones
- Margaret Chase Smith, U.S. Senator since 1949

=== Results ===
1954 Republican U.S. Senate primary
Party	Candidate	Votes	%
Republican	Margaret Chase Smith (inc.)	96,457	83.29%
Republican	Robert L. Jones	19,356	16.71%
Total votes		115,813	100.00%

== Democratic primary ==
=== Candidates ===
- Paul Fullam

=== Results ===
Fullam was unopposed for the Democratic nomination.

1954 Democratic U.S. Senate primary
Party	Candidate	Votes	%
Democratic	Paul Fullam	15,677	100.00%
Total votes		15,677	100.00%

== General election ==
=== Results ===
1954 U.S. Senate election in Maine
Party	Candidate	Votes	%	±%
Republican	Margaret Chase Smith (inc.)	144,530	58.61%	▼12.69
Democratic	Paul Fullam	102,075	41.39%	▲12.69
Total votes		246,605	100.00%	

== See also ==
- 1954 United States Senate elections
