= Charles Theriault =

American politician

Charles Kenneth Theriault

Member of the Maine House of Representatives from the 2nd district
- In office 2006–2014
- Succeeded by: Roland Martin

Personal details
- Party: Democratic
- Occupation: Retired papermaker, part-time farmer

Charles Kenneth Theriault is an American politician from Maine. Theriault represented part of Aroostook County and resides in the town of Madawaska. He is a Democrat and was first elected in 2006. He was re-elected in 2008, 2010 and 2012. While in the Legislature, Theriault served as Chair of the Transportation Committee.

Theriault is the Director of the Madawaska Snowmobile Club and International Snowmobile Festival. A Franco-American, he was also involved in plans to bring the 2014 Acadian World Congress to northern Maine and Atlantic Canada and Quebec.

== Positions ==
Theriault supports the right of a woman to terminate her pregnancy only in limited circumstances. He also supports lowering Maine's income tax.
