= Frederick Kappel =

American corporate executive (1902–1994)

Frederick Russell Kappel
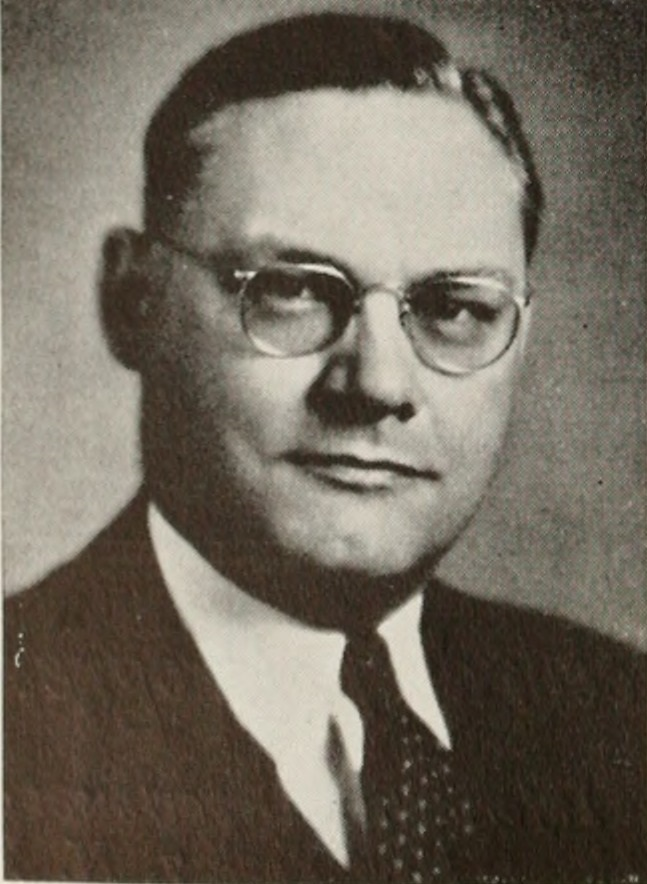
- Kappel in 1951
- Born: 1902
- Died: November 10, 1994 (aged 91–92); Sarasota, Florida, U.S.A.
- Education: University of Minnesota
- Occupations: President of Western Electric & Chairman of AT&T

Frederick Russell Kappel (January 14, 1902 – November 10, 1994) was an American businessman. He was the president of Western Electric from January 1954 until September 1956. He was chairman of AT&T from 1961 to 1972. He also served in the Johnson and Nixon administrations.

== Early life ==
Kappel grew up in Albert Lea, Minnesota. He graduated from the University of Minnesota.

== Career ==
He started his career at AT&T in 1924, working as a $25-a-week digger of telephone poles for one of its subsidiaries, the Northwestern Bell Telephone Company in Minnesota. In 1954, he became president of Western Electric, another subsidiary. In 1956, he was elected president of the American Telephone and Telegraph Company, later renamed AT&T. He also was its chairman from 1961 to 1972. He was chairman of the Business Council from 1963 to 1964.

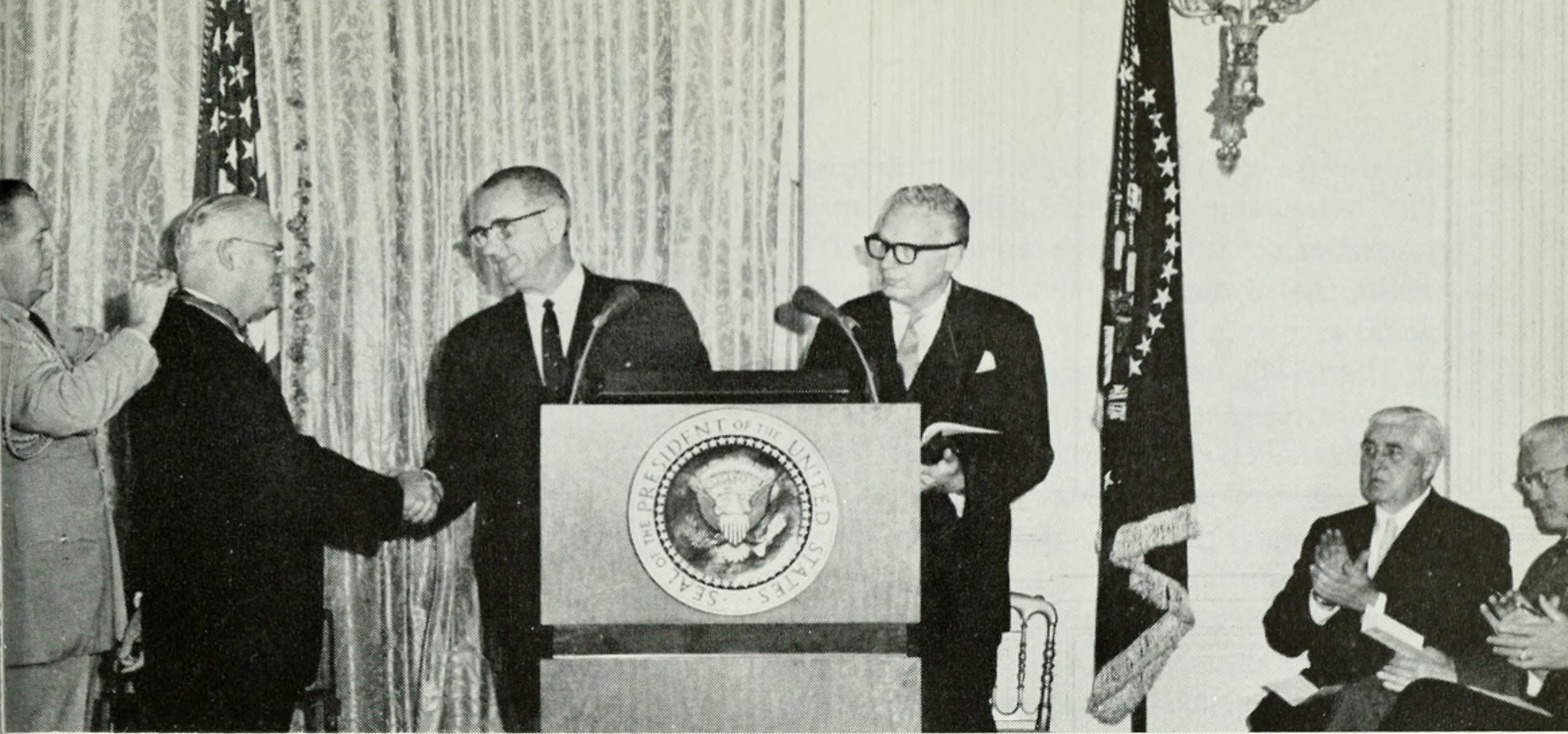
Kappel receiving the Presidential Medal of Freedom from President Lyndon B. Johnson in 1964

President Lyndon B. Johnson appointed him as chairman of presidential commissions, including the Commission on Postal Organization and, in 1967, to a special mediation board in a railroad dispute. President Richard M. Nixon appointed him as a governor of the United States Postal Service and, from 1972 to 1974, as its chairman. He was on the cover of Time on May 29, 1964. He received the Presidential Medal of Freedom in 1964 and the John Fritz Medal in 1965.

He was on the boards of directors of Chase Manhattan Bank and General Foods. He was chairman of the board of International Paper from 1969 to 1971, and chairman of its executive committee from 1971 to 1972.

== Personal life ==
He had a first marriage in 1927 and a second marriage in 1978. He died of Alzheimer's disease in Sarasota, Florida, on November 10, 1994.

== Bibliography ==
- Business Purpose and Performance: Selections from Talks and Papers (1964)
