= Elmer H. Violette =

American judge and politician

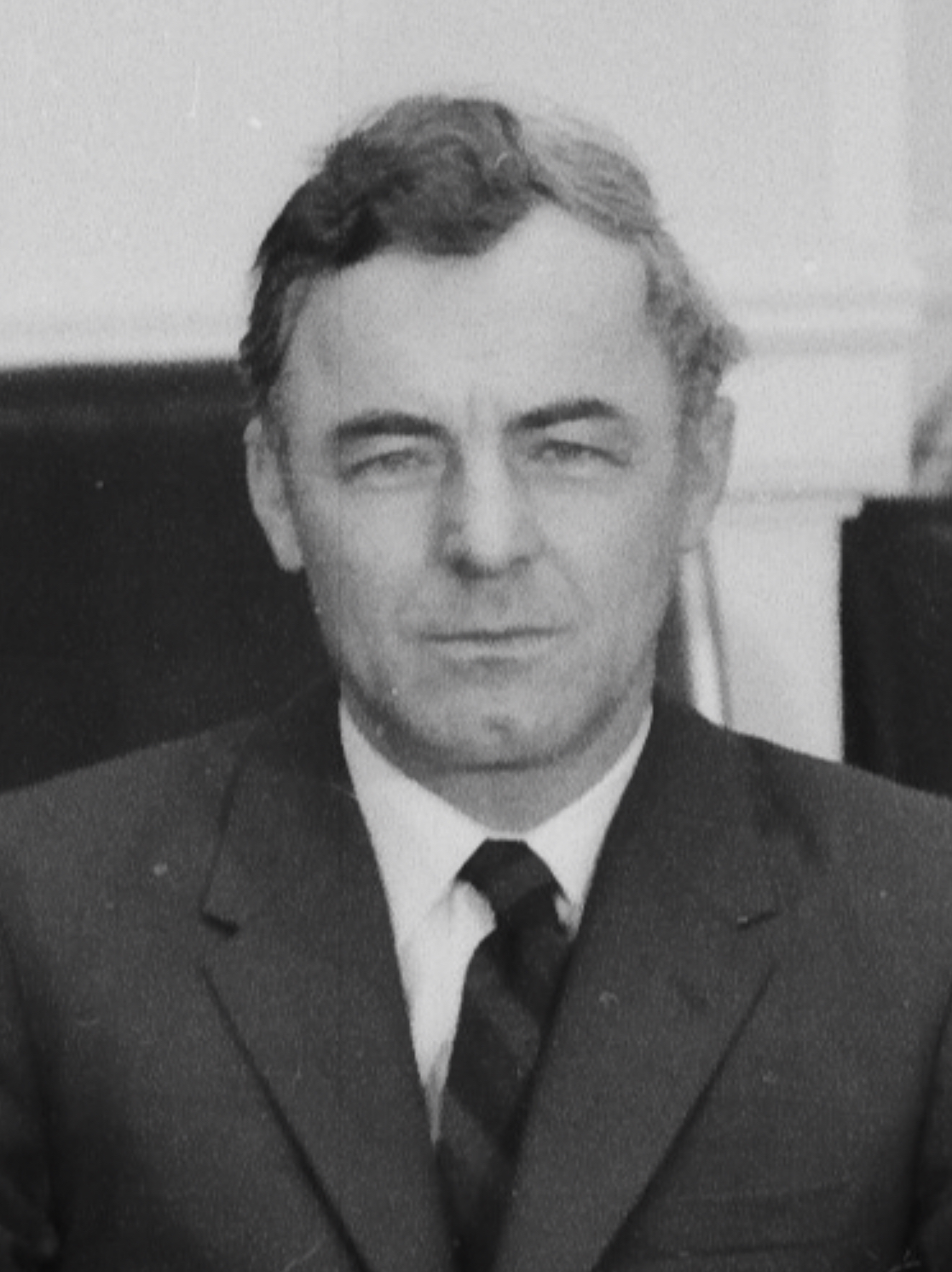
- Violette as a State Senator in 1971

Associate Justice of the Maine Supreme Judicial Court
- In office August 31, 1981 – August 1, 1986
- Appointed by: Joseph E. Brennan

Justice of the Maine Superior Court
- In office 1973–1981
- Appointed by: Kenneth M. Curtis

Member of the Maine Senate from the 24th district
- In office 1969–1973
- In office 1965–1967

Member of the Maine House of Representatives from the Grand Isle and Van Buren district
- In office 1947–1949
- Preceded by: Albert G. Cyr
- Succeeded by: Charles L. O'Connell
- In office 1943–1943
- Preceded by: Fortunat O. Michaud
- Succeeded by: Wilfred J. Sirois

Personal details
- Born: Elmer Hector Violette; February 2, 1921 Van Buren, Maine, U.S.
- Died: June 18, 2000 (aged 79) Caribou, Maine, U.S.
- Resting place: Van Buren, Maine
- Party: Democratic
- Spouse: Marcella Belanger
- Children: 5
- Education: Ricker College; Boston University
- Occupation: Politician; lawyer; jurist

Military service
- Branch/service: United States Army
- Years of service: 1942–1945
- Battles/wars: World War II

Elmer Hector Violette (February 2, 1921 – June 18, 2000) was an American jurist and Democratic Party politician from Maine. He was a justice of the Maine Supreme Judicial Court from 1981 to 1986 as well as a member of the Maine Superior Court, Maine Senate, and Maine House of Representatives.

== Childhood ==
Elmer Hector Violette was born on February 2, 1921, in Van Buren, Maine. He was one of seven siblings. His father was a woodsman, butcher, and grocer during the Great Depression, and his mother was a schoolteacher. Both were staunch Democrats, and his father had even served in the Maine House of Representatives. A French Canadian, Violette was raised Roman Catholic, and served as an altar boy as a teenager.

== Early career and military service ==
In 1939, Violette attended Ricker College, graduating with a two-year degree and returning to Van Buren. He was elected to the Maine House of Representatives in 1942 without opposition, but resigned on January 15, 1943, after being drafted into the U.S. Army during World War II. He went to meteorological school in Illinois and spent three years at the Bangor Air National Guard Base (then Dow Field) and CFB Goose Bay in Labrador as a weather-watcher. He was discharged from service in December 1945. His Army service number was 31147094. On September 2, 1946, he married Marcella Belanger. The couple remained in Van Buren after their marriage.

== Political career ==
In 1946, Violette was elected once more to the Maine House of Representatives. There, he met fellow Democratic legislator Edmund Muskie, who he immediately recognized as special, and he formed a harmonious relationship with the Democratic caucus there due to its small size. However, he only stayed for one term, leaving to study at the Boston University School of Law. He graduated in 1950 and practiced law in his hometown of Van Buren. By 1964, he had become the chairman of the Aroostook County Democratic Party. Violette was eventually convinced to run for state senate that year, and his re-entry into the legislature coincided with Lyndon B. Johnson's landslide victory over Barry Goldwater, sweeping Maine Democrats into power in the state legislature. This caused Maine Democrats to feel emboldened, and after being lobbied by Muskie and Governor Kenneth M. Curtis, Violette decided to run against incumbent Senator Margaret Chase Smith in 1966. He expected to lose, but enjoyed traveling across the state, talking to people, and gaining valuable experience in campaigning. Violette lost the election but won 41 percent of the vote, a surprisingly strong showing against an incumbent as well-entrenched as Smith. After his defeat, he resumed his law practice until 1968, when he ran for the state senate again. A strong supporter of the Humphrey/Muskie presidential ticket, he volunteered for Muskie, traveling across the nation with the campaign. He was elected easily and resumed his service in the state senate.

In office, Violette was a staunch liberal Democrat, helping to establish the Allagash Wilderness Waterway in 1966. He also stood up for the interests of his fellow French Americans, successfully working as a state senator to repeal legislation prohibiting the French language from Maine public schools in 1969.

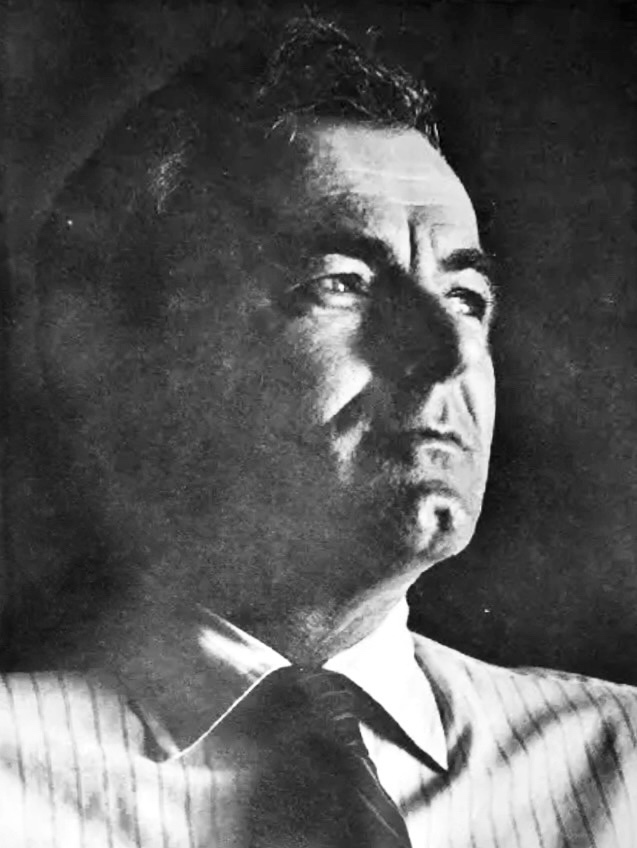
Violette in a campaign photograph, c. 1972

By 1972, Violette had again set his sights on Washington, and Edmund Muskie encouraged him to run for the Senate again against an increasingly weakened Margaret Chase Smith. However, when Congressman William Hathaway entered the race, Violette instead ran for Hathaway's open House seat in Maine's 2nd congressional district, easily winning the primary with 78% of the vote. Violette was seen as a strong candidate, but his Republican opponent, William Cohen, employed novel tactics in the race, such as walking across the entire congressional district during the summer, when most candidates campaigned lightly or not at all. Violette's slogan in the campaign was “Elmer Violette: Put His Experience to Work for You,” and the Portland Press Herald said of him that “There is no man better liked and respected in the Maine Legislature among both Republicans and Democrats than Elmer Violette.” Despite his personal popularity, he was defeated by Cohen in the November election, winning 46 percent of the vote. Violette left the election in a sour mood, blaming his loss on poor management of his own campaign, misinformation pushed by Cohen's campaign, and a wide fundraising gap between the two candidates.

After his defeat, he was approached by Governor Kenneth M. Curtis, who offered him a choice between an appointment to the Maine Superior Court or the Maine Supreme Court. Violette chose the former over the latter because the governor's council would not elevate someone to the Supreme Court without any experience on the Superior Court. During his tenure, he clashed with Maine's public utilities commission over regulatory policy. He served there for a total of eight years until Governor Joseph E. Brennan elevated him to the Maine Supreme Court, where he would serve from 1981 until his retirement in 1986.

Violette's son, Paul Elmer Violette, also served in the Maine Legislature for five terms, including three in the Senate and one as Senate Majority Leader from 1985 to 1986. However, he was later sent to prison for embezzling $430,000 from the Maine Turnpike Authority while he headed the quasi-state agency.

== Later life and death ==
Violette retired from the Maine Supreme Court on August 1, 1986, and returned to private life. He died on June 18, 2000, at the age of 79 at the Cary Medical Center in Caribou, following a car accident 10 days earlier. He was interred in his hometown of Van Buren, Maine.

Party political offices
Preceded by Lucia M. Cormier	Democratic nominee for U.S. Senator from Maine (Class 2); 1966	Succeeded by William D. Hathaway
Preceded by William D. Hathaway	Democratic nominee for U.S. Congress from Maine's 2nd congressional district 1972	Succeeded by Markham L. Gartley
