= 1966 United States Senate election in Maine =

- November 8, 1966
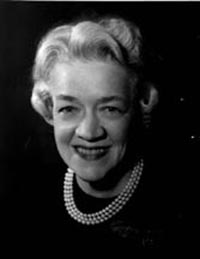

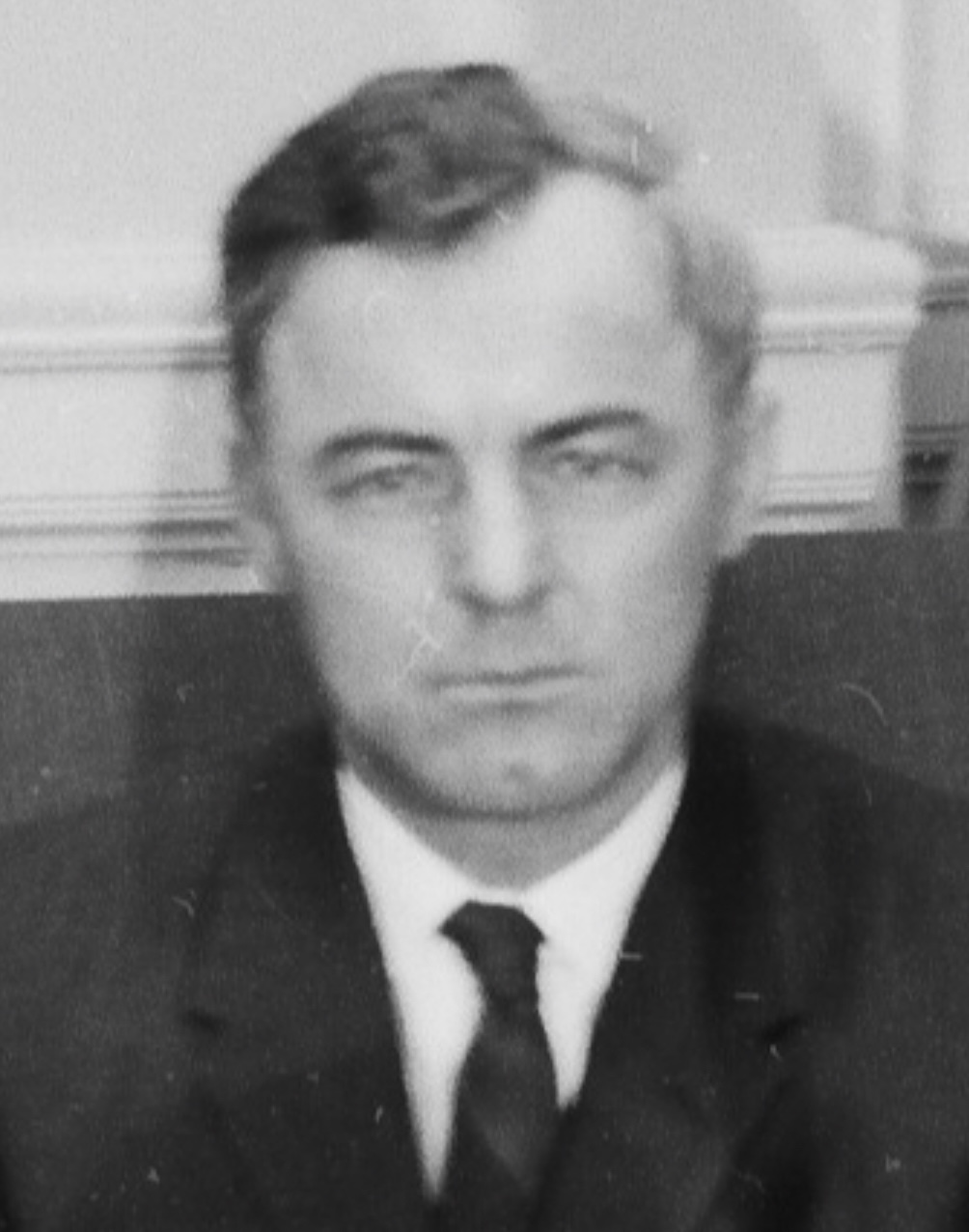
Nominee	Margaret Chase Smith	Elmer H. Violette
Party	Republican	Democratic
Popular vote	188,291	131,136
Percentage	58.93%	41.04%
- Smith: 50–60% 60–70% 70–80% 80–90% >90% Violette: 50–60% 60–70% 70–80% 80–90% >90% Tie: 50%
U.S. senator before election
Margaret Chase Smith
Republican
Elected U.S. senator
Margaret Chase Smith
Republican

The 1966 United States Senate election in Maine was held on November 8, 1966. Incumbent Republican U.S. Senator Margaret Chase Smith was re-elected to a fourth term over Democratic State Senator Elmer H. Violette.

== Republican primary ==
=== Candidates ===
- Margaret Chase Smith, U.S. Senator since 1949

=== Results ===
Senator Smith was unopposed for renomination

1966 Maine Republican U.S. Senate primary
Party	Candidate	Votes	%
Republican	Margaret Chase Smith (inc.)	85,437	100.00%
Total votes		85,437	100.00%

== Democratic primary ==
=== Candidates ===
- Jack L. Smith
- Plato Truman, perennial candidate
- Elmer H. Violette, State Senator from Van Buren

=== Results ===
1966 Democratic U.S. Senate primary
Party	Candidate	Votes	%
Democratic	Elmer H. Violette	23,259	45.17%
Democratic	Plato Truman	19,844	38.54%
Democratic	Jack L. Smith	8,386	16.29%
Total votes		51,489	100.00%

== General election ==
=== Results ===
1966 U.S. Senate election in Maine
Party	Candidate	Votes	%	±%
Republican	Margaret Chase Smith (incumbent)	188,291	58.93%	▼2.72
Democratic	Elmer H. Violette	131,136	41.04%	▲2.69
Republican	Neil S. Bishop (write-in)	108	0.03%	N/A
Total votes		319,535	100.00%	

== See also ==
- 1966 United States Senate elections
