= Crystal, Maine =

Town in Maine, United States

- Town
- Location of Crystal, Maine
- Coordinates: 45°59′20″N 68°22′08″W
- Country: United States
- State: Maine
- County: Aroostook

Area
  - Total: 40.43 sq mi (104.71 km^{2})
  - Land: 40.40 sq mi (104.64 km^{2})
  - Water: 0.031 sq mi (0.08 km^{2})
- Elevation: 482 ft (147 m)

Population (2020)
  - Total: 248
  - Density: 6.2/sq mi (2.4/km^{2})
- Time zone: UTC-5 (Eastern (EST))
  - Summer (DST): UTC-4 (EDT)
- ZIP code: 04747
- Area code: 207
- FIPS code: 23-15395
- GNIS feature ID: 582426

Crystal is a town in Aroostook County, Maine, United States. The population was 248 at the 2020 census.

== Geography ==
According to the United States Census Bureau, the town has a total area of 40.43 square miles (104.71 km^{2}), of which 40.40 square miles (104.64 km^{2}) is land and 0.03 square miles (0.08 km^{2}) is water.

It is bordered by Sherman to the south, Island Falls to the east, Hersey to the north and Patten in Penobscot County to the west.

== Demographics ==
Historical population
Census	Pop.	Note	%±
1870	250		—
1880	275		10.0%
1890	297		8.0%
1900	370		24.6%
1910	502		35.7%
1920	508		1.2%
1930	403		−20.7%
1940	346		−14.1%
1950	373		7.8%
1960	285		−23.6%
1970	281		−1.4%
1980	349		24.2%
1990	303		−13.2%
2000	285		−5.9%
2010	269		−5.6%
2020	248		−7.8%
U.S. Decennial Census

=== 2010 census ===
As of the 2010 census, there were 269 people, 115 households, and 84 families living in the town. The population density was 6.7 inhabitants per square mile (2.6/km^{2}). There were 147 housing units at an average density of 3.6 per square mile (1.4/km^{2}). The racial makeup of the town was 98.9% White, 0.4% Native American, and 0.7% from two or more races. Hispanic or Latino of any race were 0.4% of the population.

There were 115 households, of which 23.5% had children under the age of 18 living therein, 66.1% were married couples living together, 5.2% had a female householder with no husband present, 1.7% had a male householder with no wife present, and 27.0% were non-families. 22.6% of all households were made up of individuals, and 7% had someone living alone who was 65 years of age or older. The average household size was 2.34 and the average family size was 2.75.

The median age in the town was 51.8 years. 17.1% of residents were under the age of 18; 5.2% were between the ages of 18 and 24; 19.7% were from 25 to 44; 34.9% were from 45 to 64; and 23% were 65 years of age or older. The gender makeup of the town was 49.8% male and 50.2% female.

=== 2000 census ===
As of the 2000 census, there were 285 people, 112 households, and 89 families living in the town. The 2000 population density was 7.1 people per square mile (2.7/km^{2}). There were 134 housing units at an average density of 3.3 per square mile (1.3/km^{2}). The racial makeup of the town was 100.00% White.

There were 112 households, of which 29.5% had children under the age of 18 living therein, 68.8% were married couples living together, 8.0% had a female householder with no husband present, and 20.5% were non-families. 15.2% of all households were made up of individuals, and 7.1% had someone living alone who was 65 years of age or older. The average household size was 2.54 and the average family size was 2.85.

The median age in the town was 42 years in 2000. 22.8% of residents were under the age of 18, 7.7% from 18 to 24, 23.9% from 25 to 44, 28.4% from 45 to 64, and 17.2% who were 65 years of age or older. For every 100 females, there were 102.1 males. For every 100 females age 18 and over, there were 100.0 males.

The median income for a household in the town was $28,472, and the median income for a family was $28,750. Males had a median income of $30,417 versus $19,063 for females. The per capita income for the town was $14,338. About 6.0% of families and 8.6% of the population were below the poverty line, including 15.8% of those under the age of eighteen and 4.3% of those age 65 or older.

== Notable people ==
- Henry L. Joy, state legislator
- Marion L. Longstaff, state legislator
