= Paul Elmer Violette =

American politician

Member of the Maine Senate
- In office December 3, 1980 – December 3, 1986
- Preceded by: Danny Martin
- Succeeded by: Raynold Theriault
- Constituency: 32nd district (1980–1984); 1st district (1984–1986)

Member of the Maine House of Representatives from the 13th district
- In office 1978–1980
- Preceded by: Armand LeBlanc
- Succeeded by: Hilda Martin

Personal details
- Born: 1955 (age 70–71)
- Party: Democratic
- Parent: Elmer H. Violette (father)

Paul Elmer Violette (born 1955) is a retired American politician from Maine. Violette, a Democrat, served in the Maine House of Representatives from 1978 to 1980 and in the Maine Senate from 1981 to 1986. During his final term (1985–1986), Violette was the Senate Majority Leader. He was a resident of Van Buren, Maine. He was later sent to prison for embezzling $430,000 while leading the Maine Turnpike Authority in what prosecutors described as one of the most egregious cases of corruption in Maine history.

His father, Elmer H. Violette and grandfather, Vital E. Violette, both served in the Maine House of Representatives.
