= Clyde H. Smith =

American politician

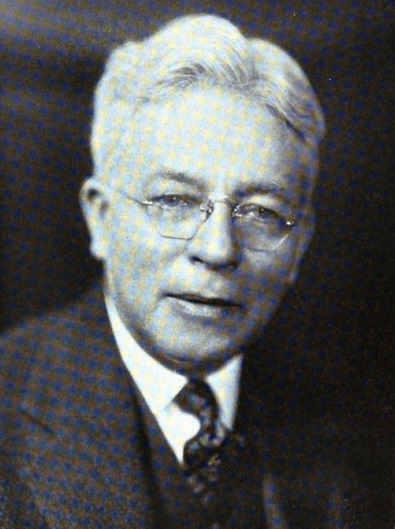

Member of the U.S. House of Representatives from Maine's 2nd district
- In office January 3, 1937 – April 8, 1940
- Preceded by: Edward C. Moran, Jr.
- Succeeded by: Margaret Chase Smith

Member of the Maine Senate from the 8th district
- In office January 3, 1923 – January 2, 1929
- Preceded by: LeRoy R. Folsom
- Succeeded by: Blin W. Page

Member of the Maine House of Representatives
- In office 1899-1903; 1919-1923

Personal details
- Born: Clyde Harold Smith; June 9, 1876 Somerset, Maine, U.S.
- Died: April 8, 1940 (aged 63) Washington, D.C., U.S.
- Party: Republican
- Spouse: Margaret Chase (m. 1930)

Clyde Harold Smith (June 9, 1876 – April 8, 1940) was a United States representative from Maine.

== Life and career ==
Born on a farm near Harmony, Maine, he moved with his parents to Hartland, Maine in 1891. He attended the rural schools and Hartland Academy, and taught school. Smith served in the Maine House of Representatives from 1899 to 1903 and from 1919 to 1923; he engaged in the retail clothing and hardware business in 1901, and was Hartland's superintendent of schools from 1903 to 1906.

From 1904 to 1907, he was a member of the Hartland board of selectmen, and moved to Skowhegan, Maine, having been elected sheriff of Somerset County, serving from 1905 to 1909. He engaged in the retail sale of automobiles and the hardware and plumbing business, as well as the newspaper publishing business in Skowhegan. He later engaged in banking and real estate. From 1914 to 1932, he was a member of the Skowhegan board of selectmen, and served in the Maine State Senate from 1923 to 1929 where he was an ardent opponent of the Ku Klux Klan that was at the time in its ascendency; he was chairman of the State highway commission from 1928 to 1932, and was a member of the Governor's council from 1933 to 1937.

Smith was elected as a Republican to the Seventy-fifth and Seventy-sixth Congresses, serving from January 3, 1937 until his death, in Washington, D.C., in April 1940. He was interred in Pine Grove Cemetery, Hartland, Maine.

Smith's wife, Margaret Chase Smith, was elected to fill the vacancy caused by his death and later went on to serve in the U.S. Senate.

== See also ==
- List of members of the United States Congress who died in office (1900–1949)

U.S. House of Representatives
Preceded by Edward C. Moran, Jr.	Member of the U.S. House of Representatives from Maine's 2nd congressional district January 3, 1937 – April 8, 1940	Succeeded by Margaret C. Smith
