= Declaration of Conscience =

1950 speech by U.S. Senator Margaret Chase Smith

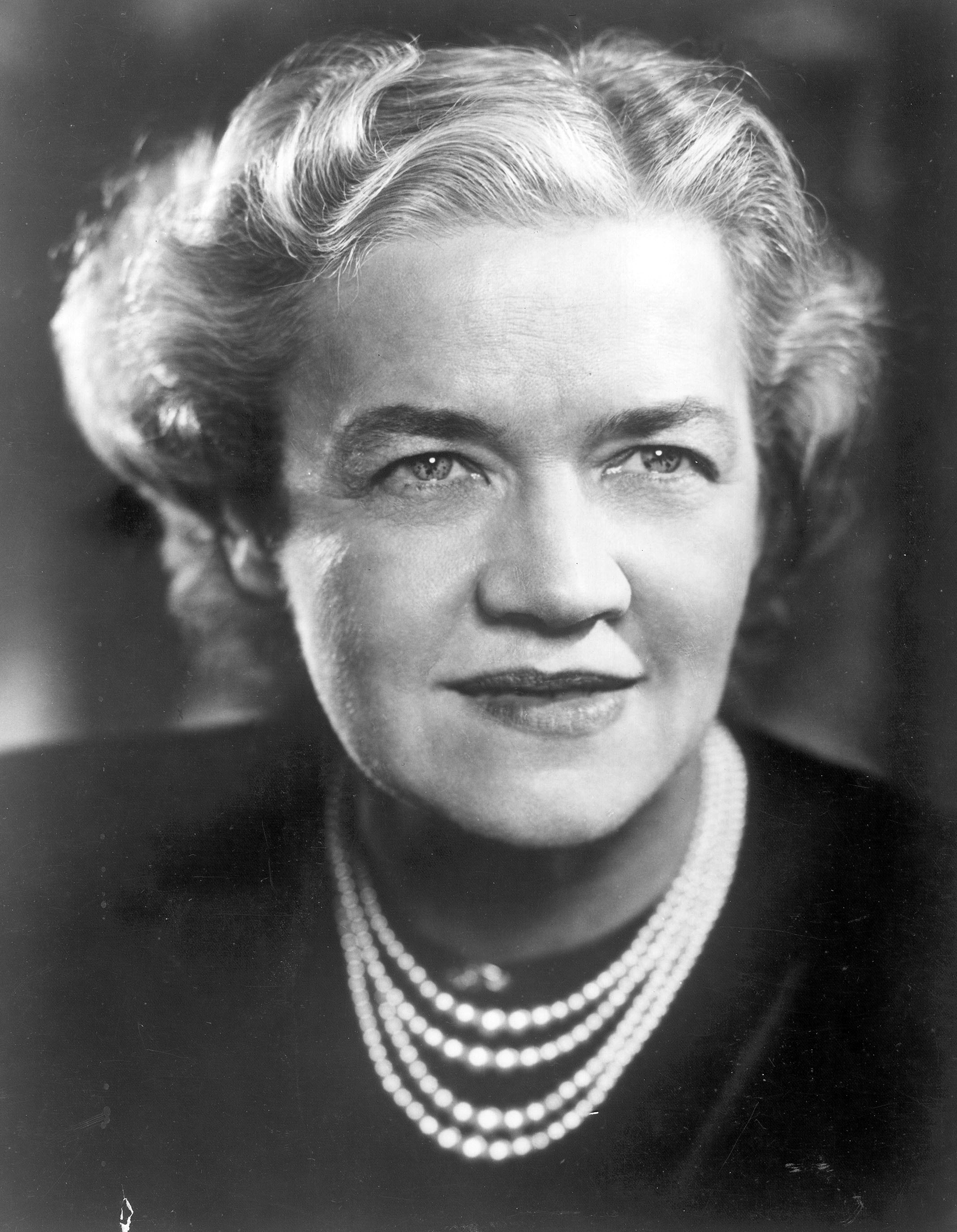
Senator Margaret Smith

"Declaration of Conscience" was a Cold War speech made by U.S. Senator from Maine, Margaret Chase Smith on June 1, 1950, less than four months after Senator Joseph McCarthy's "Wheeling Speech" on February 9.

== Description ==
Smith's speech was endorsed by six other liberal-to-moderate Republicans. In it, she criticized national leadership and called for the country, the United States Senate, and the Republican Party to re-examine the tactics used by the House Un-American Activities Committee (HUAC) and (without naming him) Senator Joseph McCarthy. She stated the basic principles of "Americanism" were:

- The right to criticize;
- The right to hold unpopular beliefs;
- The right to protest;
- The right of independent thought.

Smith voiced concern that those who exercised those beliefs at that time risked unfairly being labeled communist or fascist.

In "Declaration of Conscience", Smith said,

The Democratic administration has greatly lost the confidence of the American people by its complacency to the threat of communism and the leak of vital secrets to Russia through key officials of the Democratic administration. There are enough proved cases to make this point without diluting our criticism with unproved charges.

Surely these are sufficient reasons to make it clear to the American people that it is time for a change and that a Republican victory is necessary to the security of this country. Surely it is clear that this nation will continue to suffer as long as it is governed by the present ineffective Democratic Administration.

Yet to displace it with a Republican regime embracing a philosophy that lacks political integrity or intellectual honesty would prove equally disastrous to this nation. The nation sorely needs a Republican victory. But I don't want to see the Republican Party ride to political victory on the Four Horsemen of Calumny – Fear, Ignorance, Bigotry, and Smear.

I doubt if the Republican Party could – simply because I don't believe the American people will uphold any political party that puts political exploitation above national interest.

The other Senators who signed on to the Declaration were Wayne Morse of Oregon, George Aiken of Vermont, Edward J. Thye of Minnesota, Irving Ives of New York, Charles W. Tobey of New Hampshire, and Robert C. Hendrickson of New Jersey. While the initial reception was chilly, the full-fledged outbreak of the Korean War on June 25, 1950, had made it unlikely that Smith's views would prevail. The only signatory whose outrage remained undimmed was Wayne Morse, who eventually left the party, first becoming an independent, then a Democrat.

Bernard Baruch stated that if a man had given the Declaration speech "he would be the next President." Although it would be another four years before McCarthy would be censured, the fact that a woman was the first to speak out in the Senate against such tactics holds significance for feminist historians.
