= Danny Martin (politician) =

American politician

Member of the Maine House of Representatives
- In office December 3, 2014 – December 7, 2022
- Preceded by: Charles Theriault
- Succeeded by: Michele Meyer
- Constituency: 150th district
- In office 1975–1977
- Preceded by: Edward A. McHenry
- Succeeded by: Edward A. McHenry
- Constituency: 16th district

Member of the Maine Senate from the 32nd district
- In office 1977–1980
- Preceded by: Edward P. Cyr
- Succeeded by: Paul Elmer Violette

Personal details
- Born: Roland Daniel Martin; January 11, 1949 (age 77)
- Party: Democratic
- Spouse: Diane Mattor

Military service
- Branch/service: United States Army
- Unit: Maine Army National Guard

Roland Daniel Martin (born January 11, 1949) is an American politician who currently serves as a member of the Maine House of Representatives. He previously served one term in the House before being elected to the Maine Senate in 1976.
