= Hilda Martin =

American politician (1934–1995)

Member of the Maine House of Representatives
- In office 1981–1994

Personal details
- Born: June 16, 1934
- Died: October 26, 1995 (aged 61)
- Party: Democratic
- Occupation: Politician

Hilda C. Martin (June 16, 1934 – October 26, 1995) was an American politician from Maine. Martin, a Democrat, served in the Maine House of Representatives from 1981 to 1994. She was a resident of Van Buren, Maine.
