= Virgil L. Couch =

Virgil Lee Couch (November 12, 1907 – August 17, 1990) was employed by the United States civil defense program from 1951 to 1972. He was the head of the Industry Office and director of the industrial civil defense program for the Federal Civil Defense Administration (1951–1958) and its two successor agencies, the Office of Civil and Defense Mobilization (1958–1961) and the Office of Civil Defense, U.S. Department of Defense (1961–1972). By the time he retired, Couch had earned the title of “Mr. Civil Defense” or “Mr. Industry Defense.”

Other positions he held while working for the FCDA included deputy assistant administrator in charge of management, executive director for the National Civil Defense Training and Education Program, director of Atomic Test Field Exercises, director of the Warden Service, and U.S. representative on civil defense to NATO. In October 1961, Virgil Couch was featured on the cover of Time magazine along with an article on the U.S. civil defense program. As of that date, Couch was the only career federal employee to have achieved this recognition.
