= Margaret Chase Smith =

American politician (1897–1995)

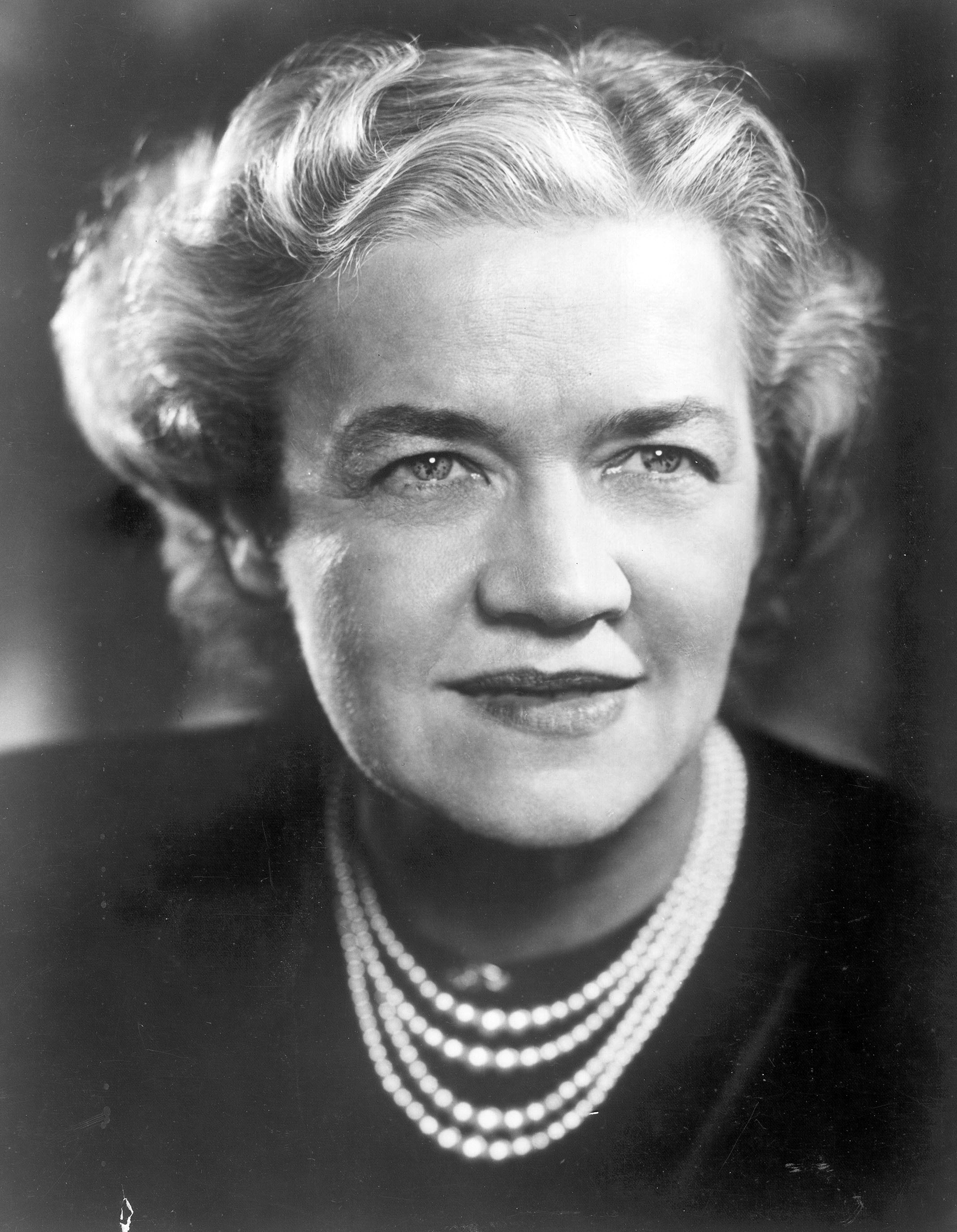

Chair of the Senate Republican Conference
- In office January 3, 1967 – January 3, 1973
- Leader: Everett Dirksen; Hugh Scott
- Preceded by: Leverett Saltonstall
- Succeeded by: Norris Cotton

United States Senator from Maine
- In office January 3, 1949 – January 3, 1973
- Preceded by: Wallace H. White Jr.
- Succeeded by: William Hathaway

Member of the U.S. House of Representatives from Maine's 2nd district
- In office June 3, 1940 – January 3, 1949
- Preceded by: Clyde H. Smith
- Succeeded by: Charles P. Nelson

Personal details
- Born: Margaret Madeline Chase; December 14, 1897 Skowhegan, Maine, U.S.
- Died: May 29, 1995 (aged 97) Skowhegan, Maine, U.S.
- Party: Republican
- Spouse: Clyde H. Smith (m. 1930; died 1940)
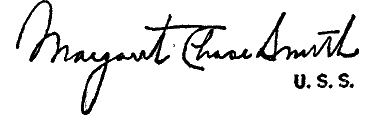
- Signature

Margaret Madeline Chase Smith (née Chase; December 14, 1897 – May 29, 1995) was an American politician. A member of the Republican Party, she served as a U.S. representative (1940–1949) and a U.S. senator (1949–1973) from Maine. She was the first woman to serve in both houses of the U.S. Congress. A Republican, she was among the first to criticize the tactics of Joseph McCarthy in her 1950 speech "Declaration of Conscience".

Smith was a candidate in the 1964 Republican Party presidential primaries; she was the first woman to be placed in nomination for the U.S. presidency at a major party's convention. Upon leaving office, she was the longest-serving female senator in history, a distinction that was not surpassed until January 4, 2011, when Senator Barbara Mikulski from Maryland exceeded her record. Smith was ranked as the longest-serving Republican woman in the Senate, a distinction that was not surpassed until January 3, 2021, when Susan Collins, then holding the same Senate seat she previously held, was sworn in for a fifth term.

== Early life and education ==
Margaret Chase was born in Skowhegan in central Maine, to Carrie Matilda (née Murray) and George Emery Chase. She was the oldest of six children, two of whom did not survive to adulthood. Her father was of English ancestry, a descendant of immigrants to the original Thirteen Colonies in the 17th century. Her great-great-grandfather commanded an artillery company during the War of 1812 and her grandfather served in the Union Army during the Civil War. Her mother's family was French Canadian, having immigrated from Quebec in the middle of the 19th century; her grandfather Lambert Morin changed his name to John Murray to avoid anti-French Canadian and anti-Catholic prejudice. Her father was the town barber, and her mother worked as a waitress, store clerk, and shoe factory worker.

She received her early education at Lincoln and Garfield Elementary Schools. At age 12, she went to work at a local five-and-dime store and even bought herself a life insurance policy. She also shaved her father's customers when he was busy or away from the shop. She attended Skowhegan High School, graduating in 1916. During high school, she played on the girls' basketball team, of which she was captain in her senior year. She also worked as a substitute operator with a telephone company during this time. In that position she met Clyde Smith, a prominent local politician, who arranged a job for her as a part-time assistant to the tax assessor.

== Early career ==
Following her high school graduation, Chase briefly taught at the Pitts School, a one-room school near Skowhegan. She also coached the girls' basketball team at Skowhegan High (1917–18). She was a business executive for the Maine Telephone and Telegraph Company (1918–1919) before joining the staff of the Independent Reporter, a Skowhegan weekly newspaper (owned by Clyde Smith) for whom she was circulation manager from 1919 to 1928. She became involved with local women's organizations. She co-founded the Skowhegan chapter of the Business and Professional Women's Club in 1922, and served as editor of the club's magazine, The Pine Cone. From 1926 to 1928, she was president of the statewide organization, the Maine Federation of Business and Professional Women's Clubs. She was a member of the Junior League of Bangor, ME. She became treasurer of the New England Waste Process Company in 1928 and was also employed as an office worker with the Daniel E. Cummings Woolen Company, a local textile mill.

On May 14, 1930, Chase married Clyde Smith, who was 21 years her senior. She soon became active in politics and was elected to the Maine Republican State Committee, on which she served from 1930 to 1936. After Clyde was elected to the U.S. House of Representatives from Maine's 2nd congressional district in 1936, Smith accompanied her husband to Washington, D.C., to serve as his secretary. In this position, she managed his office, handled his correspondence, conducted research, and helped write his speeches. She also served as treasurer of the Congressional Club, a group composed of the wives of congressmen and Cabinet members.

== U.S. House of Representatives ==
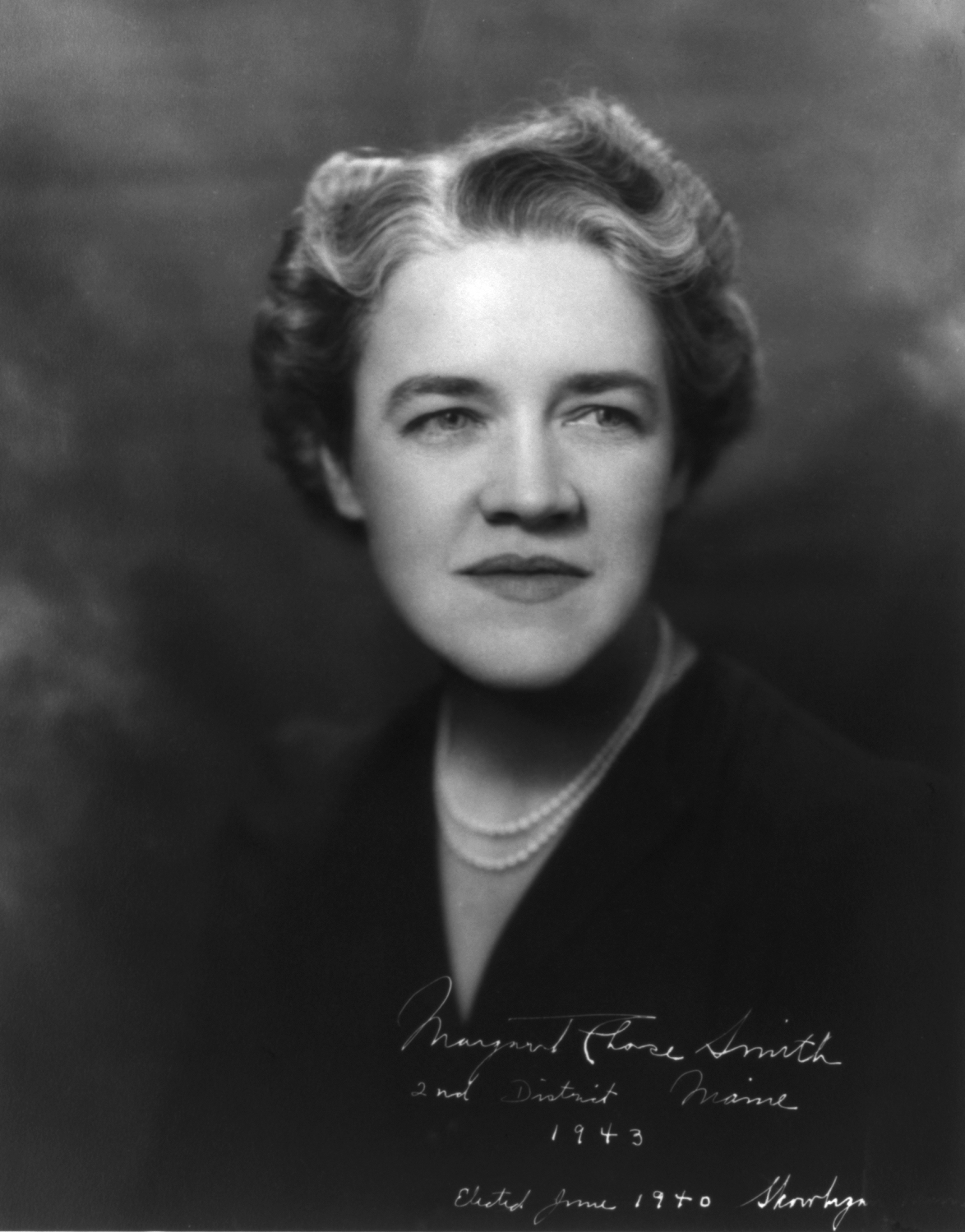
Smith in 1943

In the spring of 1940, Clyde Smith fell seriously ill after suffering a heart attack, and asked his wife to run for his House seat in the general election the following September. He prepared a press release in which he stated, "I know of no one else who has the full knowledge of my ideas and plans or is as well qualified as she is, to carry on these ideas and my unfinished work for my district." He died on April 8 of that year, and a special election was scheduled on the following June 3 to complete his unexpired term. Facing no Democratic challenger, Smith won the special election and became the first woman elected to Congress from Maine. Three months after the special election, she was elected to a full two-year term in the House in her own right. Smith defeated Edward J. Beauchamp, the Democratic mayor of Lewiston, by a margin of 65–35%. She was re-elected to three more terms over the course of the next eight years, never receiving less than 60% of the vote.

During her tenure in the House, Smith developed a strong interest in issues concerning the military and national security. After being appointed to the House Naval Affairs Committee in 1943, she was assigned to the investigation of destroyer production, and made a 25,000-mile (40,234-km) tour of bases in the South Pacific during the winter of 1944. She also became the first and only civilian woman to sail on a U.S. Navy ship during World War II. She became known as "Mother of the WAVES" after introducing legislation to create that organization. Although Congresswoman Smith was a strong supporter of women in the armed services, she did not write the legislation that created the special female military units during World War II. She did, however, champion the legislation that gave women permanent status in the military following the war, called the Women's Armed Services Integration Act.

A supporter of President Harry S. Truman's foreign policies, she was mentioned as a possible candidate for Under Secretary of the Navy in 1945 and for Assistant Secretary of State in 1947. Smith became a member of the House Armed Services Committee in 1946, also serving as chair of its Subcommittee on Hospitalization and Medicine. In this position, she sponsored and ensured the passage of the Women's Armed Services Integration Act, which was signed into law by President Truman in June 1948.

Smith earned a reputation as a moderate Republican who often broke ranks with her party. She supported much of President Franklin D. Roosevelt's New Deal legislation, as had her husband while he was in office. She voted in favor of the Selective Service Act in 1940 and voted against the Smith–Connally Act in 1943. In 1945, she voted against making the House Un-American Activities Committee a permanent body. As a member of the House, Smith began wearing a single red rose that became a daily fixture of her attire throughout her career in public office. She waged a long campaign to have the rose declared the official flower of the United States, which Congress eventually approved in 1987.

== U.S. Senate ==
=== 1948 election ===
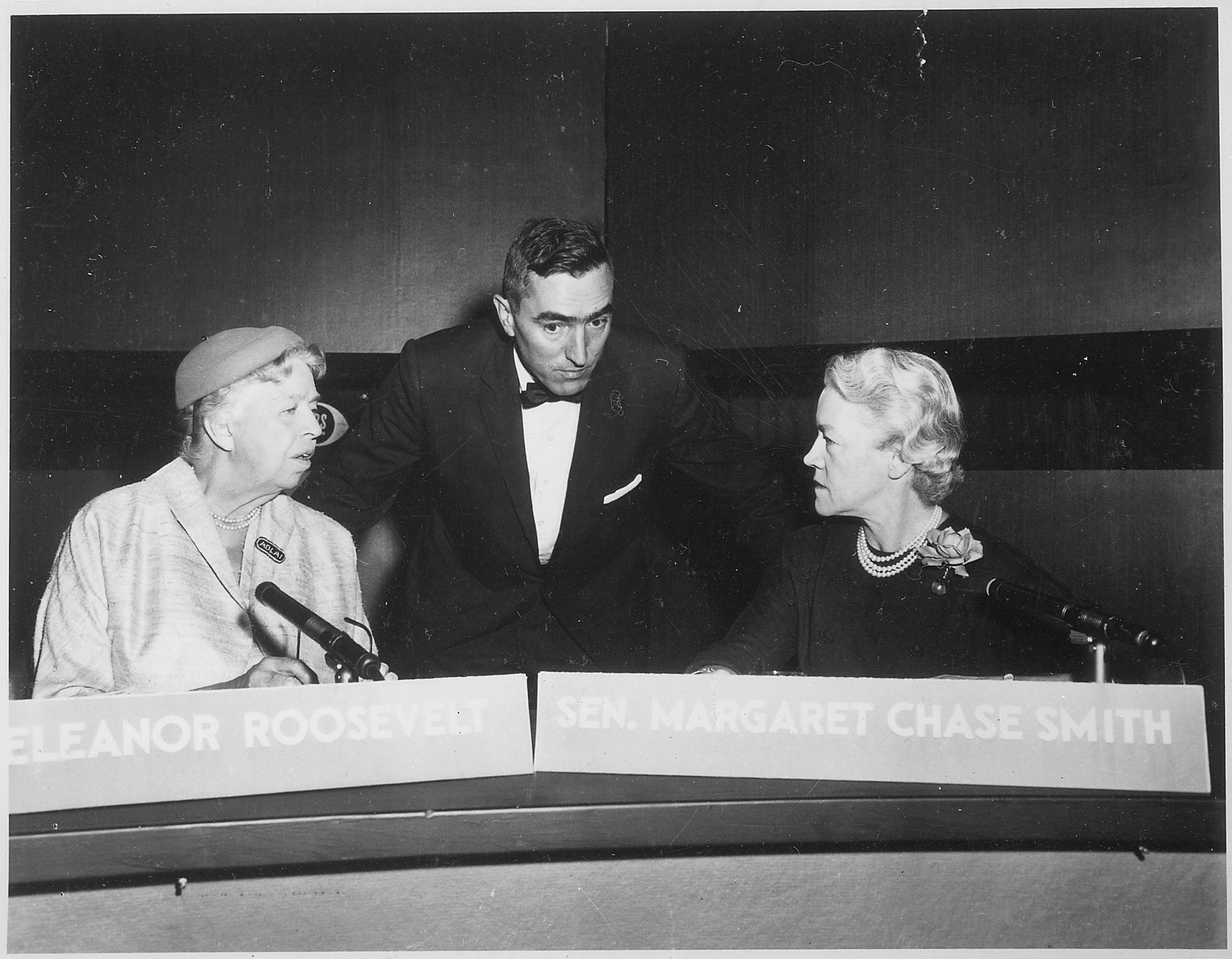
In 1956, Smith and Eleanor Roosevelt jointly appeared as the first-ever women panelists on Face the Nation. With them is the host, CBS News correspondent Stuart Novins.

In August 1947, after three-term incumbent Wallace H. White Jr. decided to retire, Smith announced her candidacy for his seat in the U.S. Senate. In the Republican primary, she faced incumbent Governor Horace A. Hildreth, former Governor Sumner Sewall, and Reverend Albion Beverage. She ran a grassroots campaign with little money, using the slogan, "Don't change a record for a promise." When the wife of one of her opponents questioned whether a woman would be a good Senator, Smith replied, "Women administer the home. They set the rules, enforce them, mete out justice for violations. Thus, like Congress, they legislate; like the Executive, they administer; like the courts, they interpret the rules. It is an ideal experience for politics." On June 21, 1948, she won the primary election and received more votes than her three opponents combined. In the general election on September 13, she defeated Democrat Adrian H. Scolten by a margin of 71–29%. She became the first woman to represent Maine in the Senate, and the first woman to serve in both houses of Congress.

=== Early tenure ===
Smith was sworn into the Senate on January 3, 1949. After a year in office, she gained national attention when she became the first member of Congress to condemn the anti-Communist witch hunt led by her fellow Republican Senator, Joseph McCarthy from Wisconsin. Smith was initially impressed by McCarthy's accusations of Communists working in the State Department, but became disillusioned after McCarthy failed to provide any evidence to validate his charges.

Smith voted in favor of Harry Truman's Supreme Court nomination of Tom C. Clark on August 18, 1949, but was absent during the nomination of Sherman Minton while Senate Minority Whip Leverett Saltonstall announced that Smith would have voted in favor if present. Smith was present in the United States Senate on March 1, 1954, when Dwight Eisenhower's nomination of Earl Warren as Chief Justice of the United States was unanimously confirmed, voted in favor of the nomination of John Marshall Harlan II on March 16, 1955, was present for the unanimous nominations of William J. Brennan Jr. and Charles Evans Whittaker on March 19, 1957, and voted in favor of the nomination of Potter Stewart on May 5, 1959. She opposed the tactics being used by members of her party, such as Joseph McCarthy, and spoke out saying, "As an American, I condemn a Republican Fascist just as much as I condemn a Democrat Communist. They are equally dangerous to you and me and to our country. As an American, I want to see our nation recapture the strength and unity it once had when we fought the enemy instead of ourselves."

=== Declaration of Conscience ===
On June 1, 1950, Smith delivered a fifteen-minute speech on the Senate floor, known as the "Declaration of Conscience," in which she refused to name McCarthy directly but denounced "the reckless abandon in which unproved charges have been hurled from this side of the aisle." She said McCarthyism had "debased" the Senate to "the level of a forum of hate and character assassination." She defended every American's "right to criticize ... right to hold unpopular beliefs ... right to protest; the right of independent thought." While acknowledging her desire for Republicans' political success, she said, "I don't want to see the Republican Party ride to political victory on the four horsemen of calumny—fear, ignorance, bigotry, and smear." Six other moderate Republican Senators signed on to her Declaration: Wayne Morse from Oregon, George Aiken from Vermont, Edward Thye from Minnesota, Irving Ives from New York, Charles Tobey from New Hampshire, and Robert C. Hendrickson from New Jersey. Her speech ended with a warning: "It is high time that we all stopped being tools and victims of totalitarian techniques—techniques that, if continued here unchecked, will surely end what we have come to cherish as the American way of life."

In response to her speech, McCarthy referred to Smith and the six other Senators as "Snow White and the Six Dwarfs." He removed her as a member of the Permanent Subcommittee on Investigations, giving her seat to Senator Richard Nixon from California. He also helped finance an unsuccessful primary challenger during Smith's re-election campaign in 1954. Smith later observed, "If I am to be remembered in history, it will not be because of legislative accomplishments, but for an act I took as a legislator in the U.S. Senate when on June 1, 1950, I spoke ... in condemnation of McCarthyism, when the junior Senator from Wisconsin had the Senate paralyzed with fear that he would purge any Senator who disagreed with him." She voted for McCarthy's censure in 1954.

On July 17, 1950, Smith was commissioned as a lieutenant colonel in the Air Force Reserve, and she served until 1958. In the 1952 U.S. presidential election, Smith was widely mentioned as a vice-presidential candidate under General Dwight D. Eisenhower. When asked by a reporter what she would do if she woke up one morning and found herself in the White House, she replied: "I'd go straight to Mrs. Truman and apologize. Then I'd go home." At that year's Republican National Convention, a group of women delegates (led by former congresswoman Clare Boothe Luce) had sought to nominate Smith. Smith, however, requested not to be proposed at the convention as a vice presidential delegate. Noting that Eisenhower's supporters had coalesced around Richard Nixon for the vice presidential nomination, Luce withdrew her nomination of Smith in the convention's vice presidential balloting. On December 3, 1957, Smith became the first woman in Congress to break the sound barrier, which she did as a passenger in an F-100 Super Sabre piloted by Air Force Major Clyde Good. Exhibiting the same independent nature in the Senate as she had in the House, Smith opposed President Eisenhower's nomination of Lewis Strauss as Secretary of Commerce in 1959.

=== 1960 re-election ===
In her successful re-election campaign in 1960, she ran against Democrat Lucia Cormier; it was the first time in American history that two women ran against each other as the major party candidates for a Senate seat.

=== 1964 presidential primary campaign ===
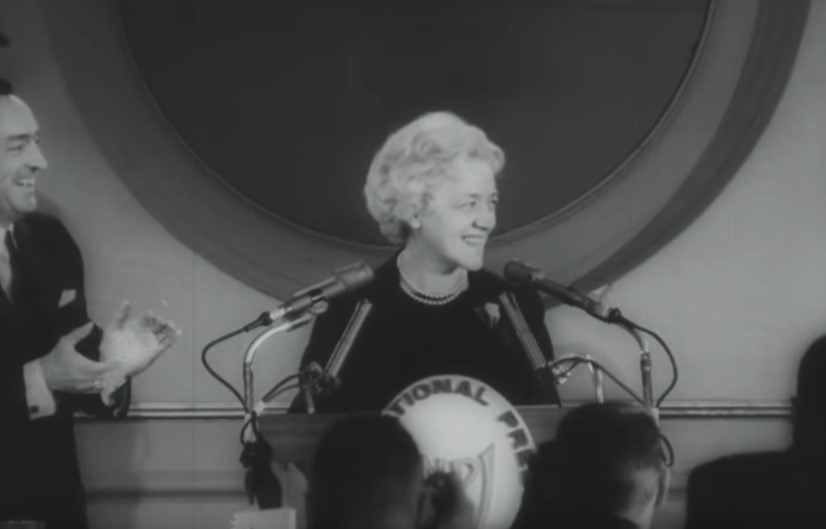
Smith announcing her candidacy for the President of the United States

On January 27, 1964, Smith announced her candidacy for President of the United States. She declared, "I have few illusions and no money, but I'm staying for the finish. When people keep telling you you can't do a thing, you kind of like to try." Gladys Shelley wrote her a presidential nomination campaign song, "Leave It to the Girls", which was sung by Hildegarde. Smith lost every single primary election but managed to win 25% of the vote in Illinois. At the 1964 Republican National Convention in San Francisco, she became the first woman to have her name be placed in nomination for the presidency at a major political party's convention. She placed fifth in the initial balloting, and denied unanimous consent for Senator Barry Goldwater from Arizona after refusing to withdraw her name from the final ballot. She nevertheless campaigned for Goldwater in the general election, appearing in a television ad in which she defended his position on Social Security.

=== Later tenure ===
During the administration of President John F. Kennedy, Smith argued that the United States should use nuclear weapons against the Soviet Union. This led Soviet leader Nikita Khrushchev to call Smith "the devil in disguise of a woman" whose position exceeded "all records of savagery". Smith later replied, "Mr. Khrushchev isn't really mad at me. I am not that important. He is angry because American officials have grown more firm since my speech." The morning after Kennedy's assassination in November 1963, she went into the Senate chamber before it convened and laid a rose on the desk Kennedy had occupied as a Senator. A member of the Senate Armed Services Committee, she supported the Vietnam War but opposed the deployment of the Sentinel anti-ballistic missile.

Smith was the first (and as yet only) woman to serve as chair of the Senate Republican Conference, serving from 1967 to 1972. She was a strong supporter of the space program and served as a charter member of the Senate Aeronautical and Space Committee. NASA administrator James E. Webb once commented that the United States never would have placed a man on the Moon if it were not for Smith. She supported increased educational funding, civil rights, and the creation of Medicare and Medicaid, being one of thirteen Republican senators to vote in favor of both health programs. Smith voted in favor of the Civil Rights Acts of 1957, 1960, 1964, and 1968, as well as the 24th Amendment to the U.S. Constitution and the Voting Rights Act of 1965. Chase Smith was one of six Senate Republicans to support a repeal of the right-to-work section of the Taft-Hartley Act, and was supportive of the Comprehensive Child Development Act of 1971 and the Equal Rights Amendment. She held an all-time voting record in the Senate until 1981 with 2,941 consecutive roll call votes.

Smith was present in the Senate when Kennedy's Supreme Court nominations of Byron White and Arthur Goldberg to the U.S. Supreme Court were unanimously confirmed on April 11, 1962, and on September 25, 1962, respectively. Smith was present in the Senate when Lyndon Johnson's nomination of Abe Fortas was unanimously confirmed on August 11, 1965, and voted in favor of the confirmation of Thurgood Marshall on August 30, 1967. On June 9, 1969, Smith voted in favor of President Nixon's nomination of Warren E. Burger as Chief Justice of the United States. Smith voted against Nixon's failed Supreme Court nomination of Clement Haynsworth on November 21, 1969, and a few months later, Smith voted against Nixon's failed Supreme Court nomination of Harrold Carswell on April 8, 1970. The following month, Smith voted in favor of Nixon's nomination of Harry Blackmun on May 12, 1970. On December 6, 1971, Smith voted in favor of Nixon's nomination of Lewis F. Powell Jr., and on December 10, Smith was absent when Nixon's nomination of William Rehnquist as Associate Justice was confirmed while Senate Minority Whip Robert P. Griffin announced that Smith would have voted in favor if present.

=== 1972 election ===
She was defeated for re-election in 1972 by Democrat Bill Hathaway, the only election she ever lost in the state of Maine. In her last election, Smith had been plagued by rumors of poor health (she had been using a motor scooter around the Senate). Her Republican primary challenger, attorney Robert A. G. Monks, taunted her for being out of touch; she did not have a state office operating in Maine. Smith lost the election by 27,230 votes, a margin of 53–47%.

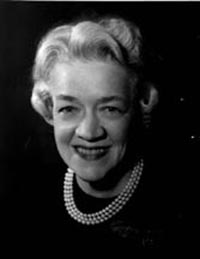
Senator Smith

=== Awards and honors ===
She was elected a Fellow of the American Academy of Arts and Sciences in 1952. In 1973, Smith was inducted into the National Women's Hall of Fame. In the 1980s, she was presented with the Daughters of the American Revolution's Medal of Honor by President General Patricia Walton Shelby. In 1995 Smith was awarded the Naval Heritage Award by the U.S. Navy Memorial Foundation for her support of the U.S. Navy, U.S. Naval Reserves WAVES, and the military during her congressional career. She was awarded the Presidential Medal of Freedom by President George H. W. Bush on July 6, 1989.

== Later life and death ==
Following her departure from the Senate in January 1973, Smith taught at several colleges and universities as a visiting professor for the Woodrow Wilson National Fellowship Foundation (1973–1976). She resumed her residence in Skowhegan, where she oversaw the construction of a library to hold her papers. Smith died at her Skowhegan home on May 29, 1995, at the age of 97, after suffering a stroke and falling into a coma eight days earlier. She was the last living U.S. senator who had been born in the 19th century. Smith was cremated, and her ashes were placed in the residential wing of the Margaret Chase Smith Library in Skowhegan.

== Legacy ==
Smith is the namesake for the Maine State Ferry Service's Islesboro Ferry, which is called "Margaret Chase Smith". A large framed painting of Smith hangs in the Maine State House in Augusta. On February 2, 1952, Smith was the guest on the CBS variety show Faye Emerson's Wonderful Town, in which hostess Faye Emerson visited Washington, D.C., to feature music popular in the nation's capital. On June 14, 1953, she was the "mystery celebrity" guest on What's My Line? In 1958, Folkways Records released the album An Interview with Margaret Chase Smith, in which she spoke of women in local and national politics, and addressed the youth of the nation. In 1961, Smith published her favorite family recipe, Maine Clam Chowder, in support of the Gold Star Wives of America military family support organization.

Patricia Neal dramatized Senator Smith's Declaration of Conscience speech in the 1978 television movie Tail Gunner Joe. In 1965, she was awarded an Honorary Doctor of Laws (LL.D.) from Whittier College. In 1970, the twin Margaret Chase Smith bridges opened in Smith's hometown of Skowhegan, Maine, connecting Skowhegan Island to either side of the Kennebec River. In 1979, the Supersisters trading card set was produced and distributed; one of the cards featured Smith's name and picture.

Janis Benson portrayed Senator Smith in the 1998 miniseries From the Earth to the Moon. On June 13, 2007, the U.S. Postal Service issued a 58¢ postage stamp in its Distinguished Americans series to honor her. In 2010, the United States political action committee Maggie's List was founded, named after Smith; it works to "raise awareness and funds to increase the number of conservative women elected to federal public office." In 2019, Time created 89 new covers to celebrate women of the year starting from 1920; it chose Smith for 1950. In 2020, Joe DiPietro debuted a play 'Conscience' about Sen. Smith's declaration and her development as a politician. On June 8, 2022, a room in the U.S. Capitol was named after Smith (the Margaret Chase Smith room). It is one of the first two rooms in the Capitol to be named after women who were senators, the other being the Barbara Mikulski room, which was named on the same day.

== See also ==
- Chase family
- Women in the United States House of Representatives
- Women in the United States Senate

U.S. House of Representatives
Preceded by Clyde Smith	Member of the U.S. House of Representatives from Maine's 2nd congressional district 1940–1949	Succeeded by Charles P. Nelson
Party political offices
Preceded by Wallace White	Republican nominee for U.S. Senator from Maine (Class 2); 1948, 1954, 1960, 1966, 1972	Succeeded by William Cohen
Preceded by Leverett Saltonstall	Chair of the Senate Republican Conference; 1967–1973	Succeeded by Norris Cotton
U.S. Senate
Preceded by Wallace White	U.S. Senator (Class 2) from Maine; 1949–1973; Served alongside: Owen Brewster, Frederick Payne, Edmund Muskie	Succeeded by William Hathaway
Preceded by Alexander Wiley	Ranking Member of the Senate Space Committee; 1963–1971	Succeeded by Carl Curtis
Preceded by Leverett Saltonstall	Ranking Member of the Senate Armed Services Committee; 1967–1973	Succeeded by Strom Thurmond
Honorary titles
Preceded by Peter J. De Muth	Oldest living United States representative (sitting or former); 1993–1995	Succeeded by Newt V. Mills
Preceded by Milward Simpson	Oldest living United States senator (sitting or former); 1993–1995	Succeeded by Jennings Randolph
