= Lyndon B. Johnson Supreme Court candidates =

Nominations made by Lyndon B. Johnson to the Supreme Court of the United States

The nominations made by Lyndon B. Johnson to the Supreme Court of the United States are unusual in that Johnson appeared to have had specific individuals in mind for his appointments and actively sought to engineer vacancies on the Court to place those individuals on the court.

== Abe Fortas Associate Justice nomination ==
Johnson intended early on to appoint his longtime friend and adviser Abe Fortas to the Court. Johnson thought that some of his Great Society reforms could be ruled unconstitutional by the Court, and he felt that Fortas would let him know if that was to happen. Johnson and Fortas did collaborate while Fortas was a justice; Fortas co-wrote Johnson's 1966 State of the Union speech. Rather than wait passively for a sitting Justice to retire, Johnson actively sought to persuade Justice Arthur Goldberg to resign his seat in order to become Ambassador to the United Nations. Goldberg's resignation from the court took effect on July 26, 1965.

Goldberg wrote in his memoirs that he resigned in order to have influence in keeping the peace in Vietnam and that after the crisis had passed he expected he would be reappointed to the Supreme Court by Johnson.

I had an exaggerated opinion of my capacities. I thought I could persuade Johnson that we were fighting the wrong war in the wrong place [and] to get out.

Fortas was easily confirmed by the United States Senate on August 11, 1965.

== Thurgood Marshall nomination ==
On June 13, 1967, President Johnson nominated Thurgood Marshall to the Supreme Court following the retirement of Justice Tom C. Clark, saying that this was "the right thing to do, the right time to do it, the right man and the right place."

Although Johnson clearly did not have any other choices in mind, his advisers have been reported to have floated other names past him for the seat that eventually went to Marshall. In a group discussion, Johnson's wife, Lady Bird Johnson, noted that "Lyndon has done so much" for blacks, and "why not indeed fill the vacancy with a woman." Arizona Supreme Court Chief Justice Lorna E. Lockwood was the main contender. Also discussed was a California judge, Shirley Hufstedler, whom Johnson later placed on the United States Court of Appeals for the Ninth Circuit. In addition, a Johnson staff member, Larry Temple, had suggested Judge A. Leon Higginbotham Jr., whom Johnson previously had appointed to the United States Court of Appeals for the Third Circuit. Johnson dismissed Higginbotham as a possibility, telling Temple,

Larry, the only two people who ever heard of Judge Higginbotham are you and his momma.

Marshall was confirmed as an Associate Justice by a Senate vote of 69–11 on August 31, 1967.

== Abe Fortas Chief Justice and Homer Thornberry Associate Justice nominations ==
When Chief Justice Earl Warren announced his retirement in June 1968, Johnson nominated Associate Justice Fortas to replace Warren as Chief Justice, and nominated Homer Thornberry, whom Johnson had previously appointed to the United States Court of Appeals for the Fifth Circuit in 1965, to the Associate Justice seat that Fortas would be vacating. Thornberry was chosen out of a larger field of candidates who were considered, including former United States Deputy Secretary of Defense Cyrus Vance, Maine Senator Edmund Muskie, United States Secretary of the Treasury Henry H. Fowler and prominent lawyer Albert E. Jenner, Jr.

However, the Warren Court's form of jurisprudence had angered many conservative members of the United States Senate, and the nomination of Fortas provided the first opportunity for these senators to register their disenchantment with the direction of the Court; they planned to filibuster Fortas' nomination. Senate Judiciary Committee chair James Eastland told Johnson he "had never seen so much feeling against a man as against Fortas." Fortas was the first Chief Justice nominee ever to appear before the Senate, and he faced hostile questioning about his relationship with Lyndon B. Johnson.

Johnson sought to help Fortas win a majority vote, but only as a face-saving measure, according to Johnson aide Joseph Califano:

"We won't withdraw the nomination. I won't do that to Abe." Though we couldn't get the two-thirds vote needed to shut off debate, Johnson said we could get a majority, and that would be a majority for Fortas. "With a majority on the floor for Abe, he'll be able to stay on the Court with his head up. We have to do that for him." Fortas also wanted the majority vote....On October 1, after a strenuous White House effort, a 45-43 majority of senators voted to end the filibuster, short of the 59 votes needed for cloture, but just barely the majority LBJ wanted to give Fortas. Later that day, Fortas asked the President to withdraw his nomination.

The debate on Fortas's nomination had lasted for less than a week, led by Republicans and conservative southern Democrats, or so-called "Dixiecrats". Several senators who opposed Fortas asserted at the time that they were not conducting a perpetual filibuster and were not trying to prevent a final up-or-down vote from occurring. However, the Senate web site now characterizes the debate as the first filibuster on a Supreme Court nominee.

In 1968, Senate rules required two-thirds of senators present to stop a debate (now 60% of the full Senate is needed). The 45 to 43 cloture vote to end the Fortas debate included 10 Republicans and 35 Democrats voting for cloture, and 24 Republicans and 19 Democrats voting against cloture. The 12 other senators, all Democrats, were not present.

The New York Times wrote of the 45 to 43 cloture roll call:

Because of the unusual crosscurrents underlying today's vote, it was difficult to determine whether the pro-Fortas supporters would have been able to muster the same majority in a direct confirmation vote.

Once Fortas withdrew his nomination in October 1968, Thornberry's nomination became moot and was withdrawn by the White House without a vote. Former Justice Arthur Goldberg later claimed that he was Earl Warren's preference to succeed him. After Fortas's nomination was withdrawn in the face of Senate opposition, Johnson briefly considered naming Goldberg as Chief Justice as a recess appointment before rejecting the idea. New president, Republican Richard Nixon, appointed Warren Burger the next Chief Justice. David Leonhardt of The New York Times called Johnson's nomination of Fortas "one of the most consequential blunders in modern American politics" as the chair has been held by conservatives appointed by Republican presidents ever since.

== Names mentioned ==
Following is a list of individuals who were mentioned in various news accounts and books as having been considered by Johnson for a Supreme Court appointment:

=== United States Supreme Court (considered for elevation to Chief Justice) ===
- Abe Fortas (1910–1982) (Nomination Withdrawn)
- Former Associate Justice Arthur Goldberg (1908–1990)

=== United States Courts of Appeals ===

- Court of Appeals for the Third Circuit
  - A. Leon Higginbotham, Jr. (1928–1998)
- Court of Appeals for the Fifth Circuit
  - Homer Thornberry (1909–1995) (Nomination rendered moot)

=== Administration officials ===
- Thurgood Marshall (1908–1993) – United States Solicitor General (Nominated and Confirmed)
- Henry H. Fowler (1908–2000) – United States Secretary of the Treasury
- Cyrus Vance (1917–2002) – former United States Deputy Secretary of Defense

=== Other backgrounds ===
- Abe Fortas (1910–1982) – private lawyer and longtime adviser to President Johnson (Nominated and Confirmed)
- Lorna E. Lockwood (1903–1977) – Chief Justice of the Arizona Supreme Court
- Shirley Hufstedler (1925–2016) – Associate Justice, California Courts of Appeal
- Edmund Muskie (1914–1996) – Senator from Maine
- Albert E. Jenner, Jr. (1907–1988) – private lawyer

== See also ==
- United States federal judge
- Judicial appointment history for United States federal courts
