= Lucia M. Cormier =

American politician

Lucia Cormier
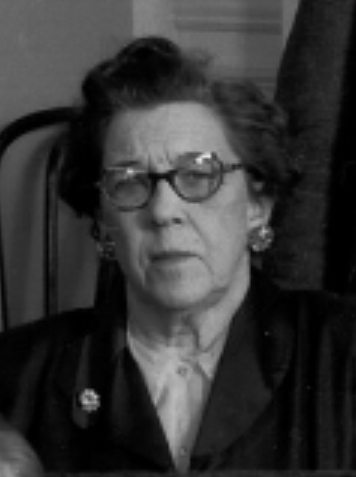

Personal details
- Born: November 20, 1909 Rumford, Maine, U.S.
- Died: January 26, 1993 (aged 83) Daytona Beach, Florida, U.S.
- Party: Democratic
- Education: College of Saint Elizabeth (BS)

Lucia M. Cormier (November 20, 1909 – January 26, 1993) was an American politician from Maine. Cormier, a Democrat from Rumford, served in the Maine House of Representatives from 1947 to 1950 and 1953 to 1960. In 1950, Cormier defeated Adrian Scolten to win the Democratic nomination for Maine's 1st congressional district. She lost in the general election to incumbent Robert Hale with 46% of the vote, which was considered a strong showing in Republican-controlled Maine. She later became a Maine delegate to the Democratic National Committee.

In 1960, Cormier left the Legislature and became the Democratic nominee for United States Senate. Her opponent was incumbent Republican Margaret Chase Smith. On September 5, 1960, Cormier and Smith appeared on the cover of Time magazine. The Cormier-Chase Smith election was the first all-woman election for Senate in United States history. Cormier lost in the general election after receiving only 38.4% of the vote. Democratic President John F. Kennedy appointed Cormier to the position of collector of customs for Maine and New Hampshire. She maintained that position until her retirement in 1974. Cormier died in Daytona Beach, Florida in January 1993.

== Personal ==
Cormier was born in Rumford, Maine in 1909 and graduated from College of Saint Elizabeth in New Jersey. She never married and had no children. She became active in politics only in 1945 at the age of 34 by attending a local Democratic Party meeting. Within a year, she ran for and won a seat in the Maine House of Representatives.

Party political offices
Preceded by Paul Fullam	Democratic nominee for U.S. Senator from Maine (Class 2); 1960	Succeeded by Elmer Violette
