= 1966 United States Senate election in South Carolina =

- November 8, 1966
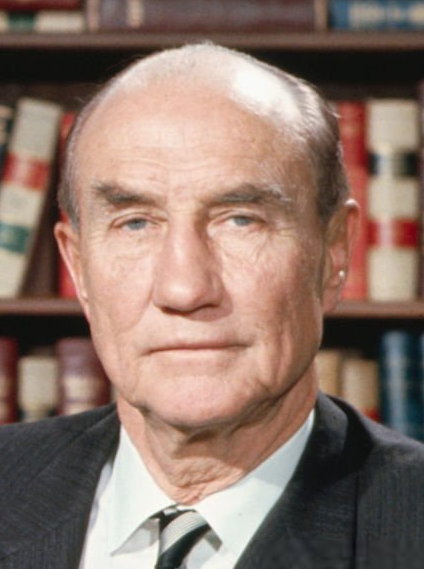

Nominee	Strom Thurmond	Bradley Morrah
Party	Republican	Democratic
Popular vote	271,297	164,955
Percentage	62.19%	37.81%
- County results Thurmond: 50–60% 60–70% 70–80% Morrah: 50–60%
U.S. senator before election
Strom Thurmond
Republican
Elected U.S. Senator
Strom Thurmond
Republican

The 1966 South Carolina United States Senate election was held on November 8, 1966, to select the U.S. Senator from the state of South Carolina simultaneously with the special election to fill out the remainder of Olin D. Johnston's term.

Incumbent Senator Strom Thurmond, who had switched parties from Democratic to Republican in 1964, easily defeated state senator Bradley Morrah in the general election. This was the first time South Carolina popularly elected a Republican senator, and the first time since 1877 that a Republican won this seat.

== Democratic primary ==
The two Democrats who could have defeated Thurmond competed against each other in the special election to serve the remaining two years of Olin D. Johnston's six-year term. As a result, little-known state senator Bradley Morrah of Greenville won the South Carolina Democratic Party primary election on June 14 against John Bolt Culbertson to become the nominee in the general election.

Democratic Primary
Party	Candidate	Votes	%
Democratic	Bradley Morrah	167,401	55.94%
Democratic	John Bolt Culbertson	131,870	44.06%
Total votes		299,271	100.00%

== Republican primary ==
Senator Strom Thurmond faced no opposition from South Carolina Republicans and avoided a primary election.

== General election ==
Morrah faced an uphill struggle against Senator Thurmond because the Democratic resources were primarily poured into the special election to help Fritz Hollings and in the gubernatorial contest for Robert Evander McNair. Furthermore, Thurmond refused to debate Morrah and Thurmond boasted of the endorsements he received from Southern Democratic Senators Richard Russell, Jr., John C. Stennis, and Herman Talmadge. Morrah was easily dispatched by Thurmond in the general election and he also lost re-election to his state senate seat. He would never again hold public office, which was a routine occurrence for Thurmond's opponents.

=== Results ===
South Carolina U.S. Senate Election, 1966
Party	Candidate	Votes	%	±%
Republican	Strom Thurmond (incumbent)	271,297	62.19%	N/A
Democratic	Bradley Morrah	164,955	37.81%	−62.16%
Total votes		436,252	100.00%	
Majority		106,342	24.38%	−75.56%
Turnout		436,252	49.1%	−6.3%
Republican hold				

== See also ==
- List of United States senators from South Carolina
- 1966 United States Senate elections
- 1966 United States Senate special election in South Carolina
- 1966 South Carolina gubernatorial election
