= 1966 United States Senate special election in South Carolina =

- November 8, 1966
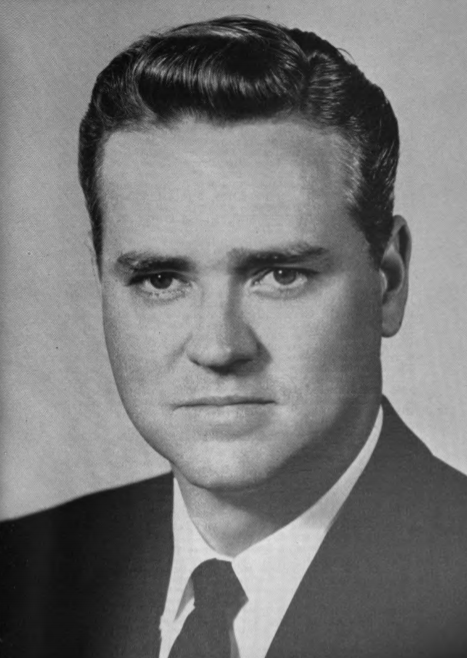

Nominee	Ernest Hollings	Marshall Parker
Party	Democratic	Republican
Popular vote	223,790	212,032
Percentage	51.35%	48.65%
- County results Hollings: 50–60% 60–70% Parker: 50–60% 60–70%
U.S. senator before election
Donald S. Russell
Democratic
Elected U.S. Senator
Ernest Hollings
Democratic

The 1966 South Carolina United States Senate special election was held on November 8, 1966, to select the U.S. Senator from the state of South Carolina. The election resulted from the death of Senator Olin D. Johnston in 1965. Then Governor Donald S. Russell entered in a prearranged agreement with Lieutenant Governor Robert Evander McNair in which Russell would resign his post so that he could be appointed Senator. However, former Governor Fritz Hollings won the Democratic primary election and went on to beat Republican state senator Marshall Parker in the general election to win his right to fill the remaining two years of the unexpired term.

== Democratic primary ==
In the 1962 gubernatorial election, Donald S. Russell had stated that he would serve out a full term and not seek a higher office. However, midway through his term he resigned from the governorship so that he could be appointed to the United States Senate. Russell faced a challenge in the Democratic primary from former Governor Fritz Hollings, who had lost to Olin D. Johnston in the 1962 primary for the same Senate seat. On June 14, the South Carolina Democratic Party held their primary election and Hollings scored a comfortable victory over Russell to become the Democratic nominee.

Democratic Primary
Candidate	Votes	%
Fritz Hollings	196,405	60.8%
Donald S. Russell (incumbent)	126,595	39.2%

== Republican primary ==
The South Carolina Republican Party was in the beginning stages of becoming a major political party in South Carolina politics. It had few elected officials in the state and when state senator Marshall Parker from Oconee County sought the Republican nomination, he did not face any opposition.

== General election ==
Parker faced an uphill battle in winning the Senate seat. First, the state was dominated by the Democratic Party and any Republican politician faced a tough time seeking election, although there was hope for Republicans because Barry Goldwater had won the state in the 1964 presidential election. Secondly, most of the resources of the Republican party were allocated for Strom Thurmond's re-election campaign and Joseph O. Rogers, Jr. gubernatorial election. Nevertheless, Parker was able to keep the race close and almost defeated Hollings in the general election.

=== Results ===
South Carolina U.S. Senate Special Election, 1966
Party	Candidate	Votes	%	±%
Democratic	Fritz Hollings	223,790	51.35%	−5.81%
Republican	Marshall Parker	212,032	48.65%	+5.81%
Majority		11,758	2.70%	−11.62%
Turnout		435,822	49.1%	+2.2%
Democratic hold				

== Aftermath ==
Hollings' first Senate victory was also his closest and he was easily re-elected in 1968 (full-term), 1974, 1980, and 1986, with somewhat tougher races in 1992 and 1998, although neither with a margin as narrow as that of his initial election. He eventually became the seventh longest-serving senator in history (just behind Robert Byrd, Thurmond, Ted Kennedy, Daniel Inouye, Carl Hayden and John C. Stennis). He and Thurmond were also the longest-serving Senate duo. Because of this, despite his length of service, Hollings spent 36 years as the junior Senator, even though - with his penultimate term - he had gained seniority of all but four of his colleagues - Byrd, Thurmond, Inouye, and Kennedy. Hollings became a nationally important political figure, e.g., serving as Chairman of the Budget committee.

== See also ==
- List of United States senators from South Carolina
- United States Senate elections, 1966
- United States Senate election in South Carolina, 1966
- South Carolina gubernatorial election, 1966
