= W. D. Workman Jr. =

American journalist and politician

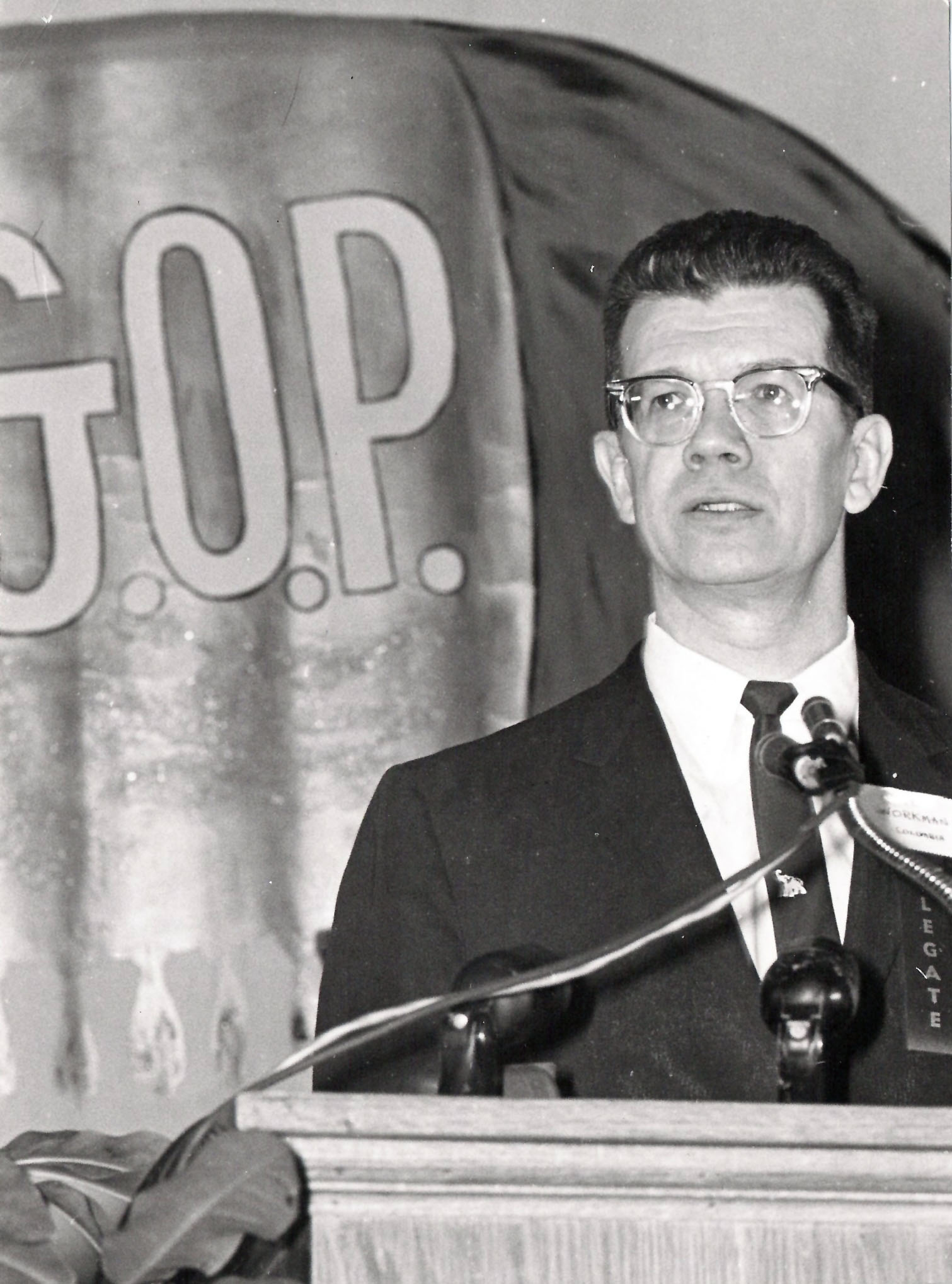
- Workman in 1962
- Born: August 10, 1914; Greenwood, South Carolina, US
- Died: November 23, 1990 (aged 76); Greenville, South Carolina, US
- Resting place: Greenlawn Memorial Park in Columbia
- Education: The Citadel
- Occupation: Journalist
- Employers: Charleston News and Courier; Columbia State
- Political party: Republican
- Spouse: Heber Rhea Thomas Workman (married 1939–1988, her death)
- Children: 2, including William Douglas "Bill" Workman, III

William Douglas Workman Jr. (August 10, 1914 – November 23, 1990), was an American journalist and politician who was a pioneer in the development of the 20th century South Carolina Republican Party.

== Early life, education, and military service ==
Born in Greenwood, South Carolina, Workman graduated from Greenville High School in 1931 and graduated from The Citadel in Charleston in 1935. He briefly attended the George Washington University Law School.

Workman managed local radio station WTMA AM in Charleston until 1940, when the U.S. Army called him to active duty during World War II. He became an intelligence officer, with domestic and then foreign duty in Great Britain, and the North African and Pacific Theater of Operations. After his demobilization in 1945, Workman remained in the United States Army Reserves for twenty years, retiring with the rank of colonel.

Post-war, Workman returned to South Carolina to work for the Charleston News and Courier, then moved to The State in Columbia, South Carolina. Workman also wrote columns and articles for Newsweek, the Hall syndicate, and South Carolina Magazine. He appeared regularly on radio and WIS, NBC's outlet in Columbia, providing political commentary.

== Political activities ==
In December 1961, shortly after the South Carolina GOP elected its first member to the state House of Representatives, Workman announced his candidacy as a Republican challenger to incumbent Democratic Senator Olin D. Johnston in the 1962 election. Workman's campaign was managed by business entrepreneur Drake Edens, sometimes considered the "father" of the modern Republican Party in South Carolina. Workman asserted that Johnston was too closely tied to the national party, and that he, unlike Johnston, represented the "conservative traditions" of the state, further stating:

It is the Republican Party which offers the best hope, and perhaps the last hope, of stemming the liberal tide which has been sweeping the United States toward the murky depths of socialism. ... We must stop floating along the stream of least resistance and get our feet back down on the firm ground of sound, conservative, responsible government.

Johnston defeated Workmen by 178,712 votes (57.2 percent) to Workman's 133,390 votes (42.8 percent). Despite this substantial loss, Workman's campaign was the first significant Republican effort in South Carolina since the Reconstruction era, presaging the 1964 defection of South Carolina's other Democratic U.S. Senator, Strom Thurmond, to the Republican Party.

In 1982, Workman ran for governor of South Carolina, though Drake Edens urged Workman, then 68 years old, not to run. Workman easily won the Republican primary over Roddy T. Martin, but was soundly defeated in the general election by incumbent Democrat Richard Riley, who received 468,819 votes (69.8 percent) to Workman's 202,806 (30.2 percent).

Workman died in Columbia, South Carolina, at the age of 76, following an extended illness.

== Books ==
In addition to his extensive career in newspaper and radio journalism, Workman wrote five non-fiction books, all of which advocated racial segregation.

- The Case for the South (1960)
- The Bishop from Barnwell (1963), a biography of South Carolina State Senator Edgar Allan Brown
- This Is the South (1959), edited by Robert West Howard, contains Workman's essay, "The Trailmakers"
- With All Deliberate Speed (1957), which sought to refute the United States Supreme Court decision on school desegregation
- Southern Schools: Progress and Problems (1959)

Party political offices
Preceded by Leon P. Crawford (1956)	Republican nominee for U.S. Senator from South Carolina; William Douglas Workman Jr. 1962	Succeeded by Marshall Parker (1966 special election)
Preceded by Edward Lunn Young (1978)	Republican nominee for governor of South Carolina; William Douglas Workman Jr. 1982	Succeeded by Carroll A. Campbell (1986)
