= Lynching of Willie Earle =

African American who was lynched in the U.S.

The lynching of Willie Earle took place in Greenville, South Carolina on February 16, 1947, when Earle, a 24-year-old black man, was arrested, taken from his jail cell and murdered. It is considered the last lynching to occur in South Carolina, although the racially-motivated murder of Betty Gardner by four white people in 1978 has also been described as a lynching. The subsequent trial gained much media attention, and was covered by Rebecca West for The New Yorker. The trial resulted in the acquittal of 31 white men who had been charged with Earle's murder.

== Arrest and lynching ==
On February 15, a Greenville cab driver named Thomas Watson Brown was robbed and stabbed to death in Pickens County. Based on circumstantial evidence, Earle was charged in Brown's attack, and was arrested at his mother's house the next day and taken to the county jail. On the evening of February 16, a convoy of taxi drivers drove to the jail and forcibly abducted Earle. The jailer, J. Ed Gilstrap, later said he turned Earle over to the mob since they had guns. The mob then beat, stabbed, and shot Earle to death.

Strom Thurmond, the newly elected governor of the state, condemned the murder. Thurmond directed state police to work alongside the FBI, and summoned South Carolina's foremost prosecutor, Solicitor Robert T. Ashmore to try the case. More than 150 suspects were questioned in the days after Earle's murder, and 31—all but three of whom were taxi drivers—were charged with the crime. Many of the men signed confessions and some of them implicated Roosevelt Carlos Hurd as the mob's leader as well as the one who killed Earle with a shotgun.

== Trial ==
The trial opened in the Greenville County Courthouse on May 5, 1947, and was presided over by Judge J. Robert Martin. After reviewing the indictment, Martin dismissed the charges against three defendants, citing a lack of evidence, and reduced the charges of seven others to being accessories before the fact to murder. This left 21 defendants still on trial for murder. The jury consisted of 12 white men. In addition to West's coverage for The New Yorker, Life Magazine was represented by a reporter and photographer, and national and international wire services were present in the courtroom.

The trial lasted two weeks, during which time the defendants were permitted to sit with their families; the effect, according to West, was that of a "church picnic." The defendants were represented by attorneys John Bolt Culbertson and Thomas A. Wofford, the latter of whom later served as a United States Senator for South Carolina. During the trial, Culbertson proclaimed that "Willie Earle is dead and I wish more like him was dead." Wofford criticized law enforcement representatives, and commented that "It took a nigger undertaker to find out there had been a lynching." The defense called no witnesses, and the jury convened on the afternoon of May 21. After five hours and 13 minutes, they returned a verdict of not guilty on all counts. Judge Martin was described as "shaken and angry", and left the courtroom without thanking the jury for its service.

== Aftermath ==
On May 23, The New York Times editorialized "There has been a victory for law, even though Willie Earle's slayers will not be punished for what they did. A precedent has been set. Members of lynching mobs may now know that they do not bask in universal approval, even in their own disgraced communities, and they may begin to fear that someday, on sufficient evidence and with sufficient courage, a Southern lynching case jury will convict."

In 1950, lawyers from the NAACP, citing a provision dated 1895 in the state constitution that assessed financial responsibility for a lynching, won a settlement from Greenville County in the amount of $3,000 on behalf of Earle's family. The same year, then state representative Fritz Hollings wrote an anti-lynching bill that was signed into law, specifying the death penalty as punishment for lynching. "No further lynchings occurred in South Carolina."
