= 1968 United States Senate election in South Carolina =

- November 5, 1968
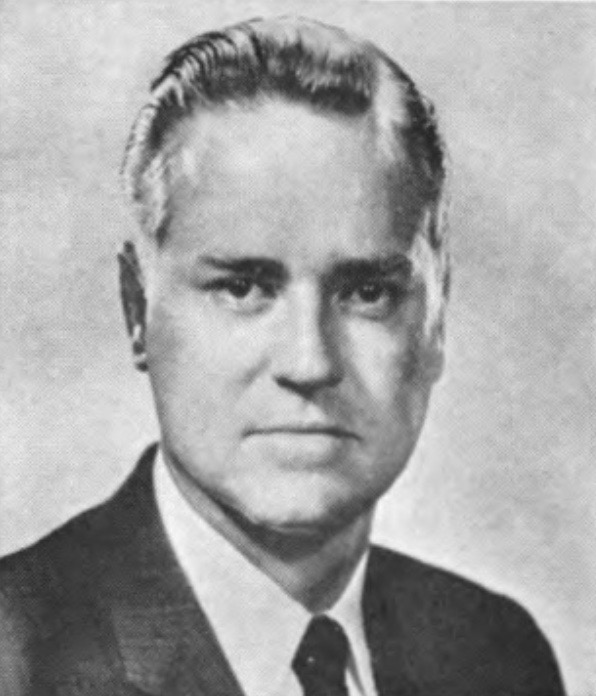

Nominee	Ernest Hollings	Marshall Parker
Party	Democratic	Republican
Popular vote	404,060	248,780
Percentage	61.89%	38.11%
- County results Hollings: 50–60% 60–70% 70–80%
U.S. senator before election
Ernest Hollings
Democratic
Elected U.S. Senator
Ernest Hollings
Democratic

The 1968 South Carolina United States Senate election was held on November 5, 1968, to select the U.S. Senator from the state of South Carolina. Incumbent Democratic Senator Fritz Hollings easily defeated Republican state senator Marshall Parker in a rematch of the election two years earlier to win his second, (his first full), term.

== Democratic primary ==
Fritz Hollings, the incumbent Senator, easily defeated his primary opponent, John Bolt Culbertson.

1968 Democratic primary for U.S. Senate in South Carolina
Party	Candidate	Votes	%
Democratic	Fritz Hollings (incumbent)	308,016	78.3
Democratic	John Bolt Culbertson	84,913	21.7
Majority		223,103	56.6
Total votes		392,929	100.0

== Republican primary ==
Marshall Parker, the state senator from Oconee County in the Upstate, was persuaded by South Carolina Republicans to enter the race and he did not face a primary challenge.

== General election campaign ==
After a close election loss to Fritz Hollings in 1966, the Republicans felt that Parker might have a chance at defeating Hollings by riding Nixon's coattails in the general election. However, the Republicans did not provide Parker with the financial resources to compete and he subsequently lost by a bigger margin to Hollings than two years prior.

== Election results ==
South Carolina U.S. Senate Election, 1968
Party	Candidate	Votes	%	±%
Democratic	Fritz Hollings (incumbent)	404,060	61.89%	+10.54%
Republican	Marshall Parker	248,780	38.11%	−10.54%
No party	Write-Ins	15	0.00%	N/A
Majority		155,280	23.78%	+21.08%
Turnout		652,855	76.5%	+27.4%
Democratic hold				

== See also ==
- List of United States senators from South Carolina
- United States Senate elections, 1968
