= Thomas A. Wofford =

American politician (1908–1978)

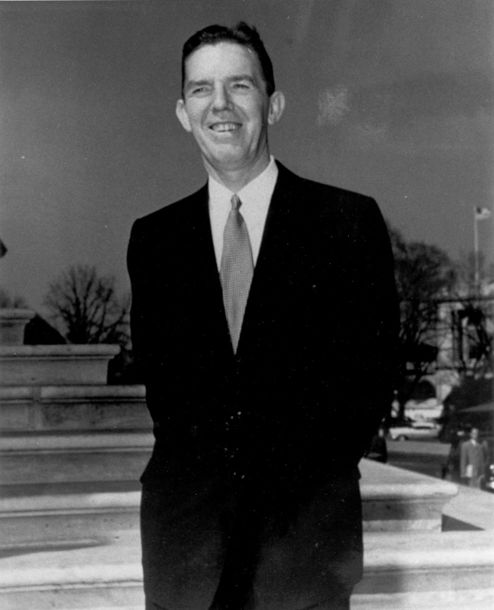

United States Senator from South Carolina
- In office April 5, 1956 – November 6, 1956
- Appointed by: George Bell Timmerman, Jr.
- Preceded by: Strom Thurmond
- Succeeded by: Strom Thurmond

Member of the South Carolina Senate from the 3rd district
- In office January 10, 1967 – December 28, 1972
- Preceded by: Patrick B. Morrah Jr.
- Succeeded by: multi-member district

Personal details
- Born: Thomas Albert Wofford; September 27, 1908 Laurens County, South Carolina, U.S.
- Died: February 25, 1978 (aged 69) Greenville, South Carolina, U.S.
- Party: Democratic (until 1966); Republican (from 1966)
- Education: University of South Carolina (BA); Harvard University (LLB)

Thomas Albert Wofford (September 27, 1908 – February 25, 1978) was a United States senator from South Carolina. Born in Madden Station, Laurens County, South Carolina, he attended the public schools and graduated from the University of South Carolina at Columbia in 1928, and from Harvard University Law School in 1931. He was admitted to the bar in the latter year and commenced the practice of law in Greenville. He was assistant solicitor of the thirteenth judicial circuit from 1935 to 1936, and was assistant United States district attorney from 1937 to 1944.

In 1947, Wofford defended the 31 white men charged with the lynching of Willie Earle in Greenville, South Carolina. The trial was highly publicized, and resulted in all of the defendants being acquitted of murder despite many of them having signed confessions.

He was a member of the board of trustees of Winthrop College from 1944 to 1956. Wofford also was a delegate to the 1948 Democratic National Convention from South Carolina.

Wofford was appointed on April 5, 1956, as a Democrat to the US Senate to fill the vacancy caused by the resignation of Strom Thurmond and served from April 5, 1956, to November 6, 1956; he was not a candidate for election to fill the vacancy, and engaged in the practice of law. He was a member of the South Carolina Senate from 1966 to 1972, and changed party affiliation to Republican. He resided in Greenville, and died there in 1978; interment was in Woodlawn Memorial Park.

U.S. Senate
Preceded by Strom Thurmond	U.S. senator (Class 2) from South Carolina; April 5, 1956 – November 6, 1956; Served alongside: Olin Johnston	Succeeded by Strom Thurmond
