= Consumer Broadband and Digital Television Promotion Act =

United States bill proposed in 2002

The Consumer Broadband and Digital Television Promotion Act (CBDTPA) (S. 2048) was a United States bill proposed in 2002 that would have prohibited any kind of technology that could be used to read digital content without digital rights management (DRM)—which prohibits copying and reading any content under copyright without permission of the copyright owner. The bill was known in early drafts as the Security Systems and Standards Certification Act (SSSCA) and was sometimes called the Consume But Don't Try Programming Act.

== Legislation ==
The CBDTPA was proposed by South Carolina senator Fritz Hollings (D-SC). Senator Patrick Leahy (D-VT), chairman of the Senate Judiciary Committee, had stated that he could "not support" the proposed legislation and, as chairman, intended to block consideration of the controversial bill. This essentially killed the bill in 2002.

Proposed penalties for violating the CBDTPA ranged from five to twenty years in prison, and fines between $50,000 and $1 million.

Richard Stallman criticized this act due to the restrictions that it would place in the immediate and long-term future on free software, dubbing the bill the "Consume But Don't Try Programming Act."

Other U.S. senators named as sponsors of the CBDTPA bill include:

- John Breaux (D-LA)
- Dianne Feinstein (D-CA)
- Daniel Inouye (D-HI)
- Bill Nelson (D-FL)
- Ted Stevens (R-AK)

== See also ==
- Trusted Computing
- Trusted Computing Group
- Trusted Platform Module
