= 1972 United States Senate election in South Carolina =

- November 7, 1972
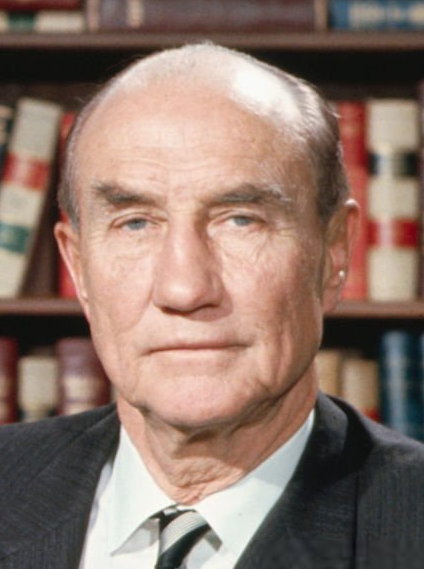

Nominee	Strom Thurmond	Eugene N. Zeigler
Party	Republican	Democratic
Popular vote	415,806	241,056
Percentage	63.29%	36.69%
- County results Thurmond: 50–60% 60–70% 70–80% Zeigler: 50–60%
U.S. senator before election
Strom Thurmond
Republican
Elected U.S. Senator
Strom Thurmond
Republican

The 1972 South Carolina United States Senate election was held on November 7, 1972 to select the U.S. senator from the state of South Carolina. Popular incumbent Republican Senator Strom Thurmond easily defeated Democratic challenger Eugene N. Zeigler. This marked the first time that a Republican was re-elected senator from the state, and the first time since 1872 when that person won consecutive elections.

== Democratic primary ==
The South Carolina Democratic Party held their primary for governor on August 29, 1972. Eugene N. Zeigler, a state senator from Florence, defeated John Bolt Culbertson to become the Democratic nominee in the general election.

Democratic primary
Party	Candidate	Votes	%
Democratic	Eugene N. Zeigler	201,170	58.66%
Democratic	John Bolt Culbertson	141,757	41.34%
Total votes		342,927	100.00%

== Republican primary ==
Senator Strom Thurmond faced no opposition from South Carolina Republicans and avoided a primary election.

== General election ==
=== Campaign ===
The general election campaign was a lackluster affair, as Thurmond was heavily favored to win re-election and he outspent Zeigler by a margin of four to one. However, Thurmond's re-election was almost derailed when his hometown newspaper, the Edgefield Advertiser, ran the headline "SEN. THURMOND IS UNPRINCIPLED WITH COLORED OFFSPRING WHILE PARADING AS A DEVOUT SEGREGATIONIST" on the October 11 front page. The Thurmond campaign fiercely denied that he had sired a black child, and claimed that it was a dirty trick being played by the Zeigler campaign. While the allegation ultimately proved true, at the time it served to galvanize voters for Thurmond.

=== Election results ===
South Carolina U.S. Senate election, 1972
Party	Candidate	Votes	%	±%
Republican	Strom Thurmond (incumbent)	415,806	63.29%	+1.3%
Democratic	Eugene N. Zeigler	241,056	36.69%	−1.3%
Write-in		172	0.02%	N/A
Total votes		657,034	100.00%	
Majority		174,750	27.0%	+2.6%
Turnout		657,034	65.2%	+16.1%
Republican hold				

== See also ==
- List of United States senators from South Carolina
- United States Senate elections, 1972
