= Joseph O. Rogers Jr. =

American politician

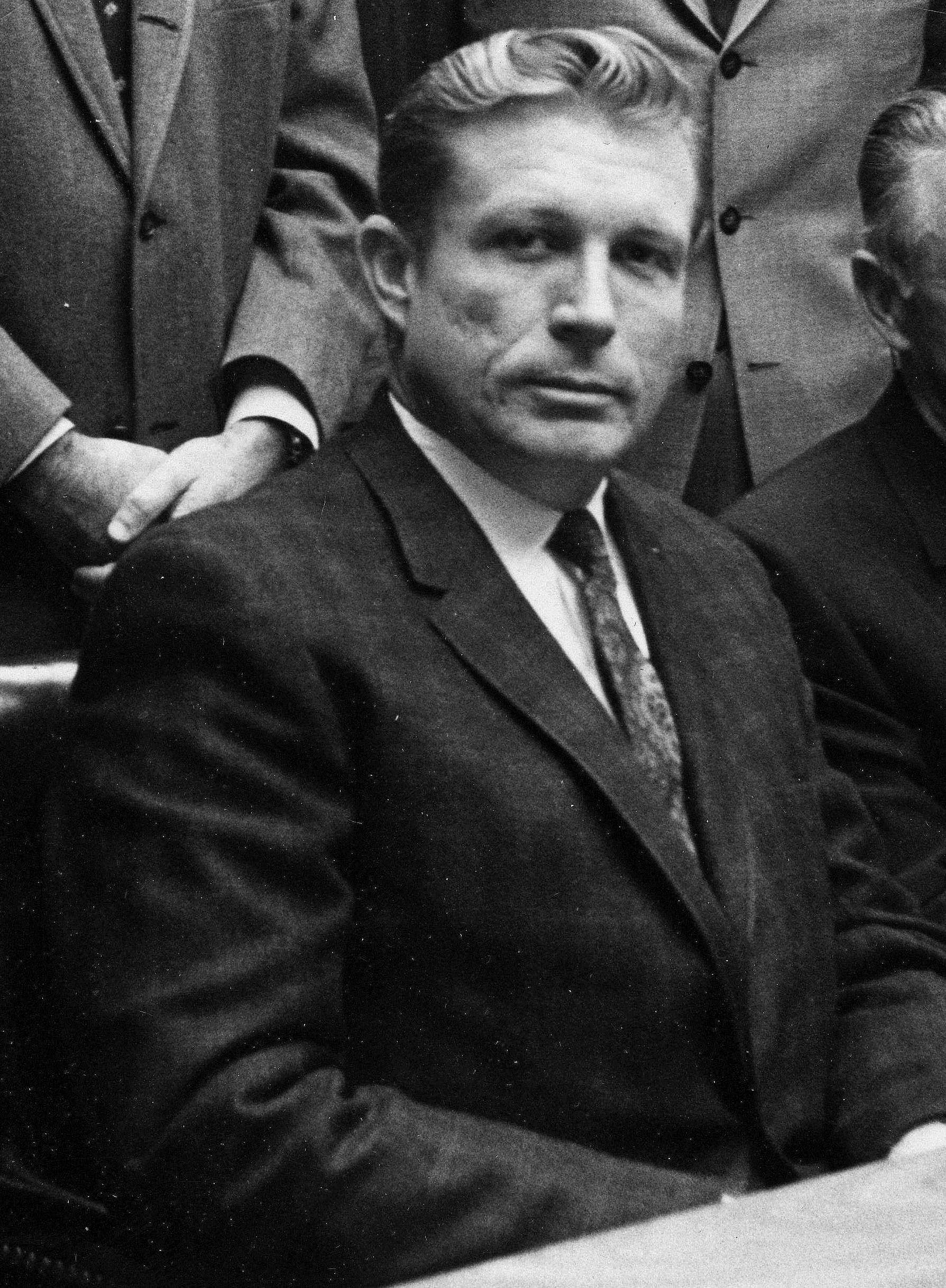

Member of the South Carolina House of Representatives from Clarendon County
- In office 1955–1966

United States Attorney for the Eastern District of South Carolina
- In office 1969–1970
- President: Richard Nixon
- Preceded by: Terrell L. Glenn Sr.

Personal details
- Born: Joseph Oscar Rogers Jr. October 8, 1921 Mullins, South Carolina, U.S.
- Died: April 6, 1999 (aged 77) Columbia, South Carolina, U.S.
- Party: Democratic; Republican
- Education: University of South Carolina School of Law

Joseph Oscar Rogers Jr. (October 8, 1921 – April 6, 1999) was an American politician. A member of the Democratic Party and the Republican Party, he served in the South Carolina House of Representatives from 1955 to 1966 and as the United States attorney for the Eastern District of South Carolina from 1969 to 1970.

== Life and career ==
Rogers was born in Mullins, South Carolina, the son of Joseph Oscar Rogers Sr. and Lila McDonald. He attended Charleston High School, graduating in 1938. After graduating, he served in the United States Army during World War II, which after his discharge, he attended the University of South Carolina School of Law, earning his LLB degree in 1950.

Rogers served in the South Carolina House of Representatives from 1955 to 1966. He lost his seat in the House, in 1966, when he ran as a Republican candidate for governor of South Carolina. He received 184,088 votes, but lost to Democratic incumbent Robert Evander McNair, who won with 255,854 votes, which after losing in the gubernatorial election, he served as the United States attorney for the Eastern District of South Carolina from 1969 to 1970.

Rogers was awarded the Order of the Palmetto by South Carolina governor James B. Edwards in 1979.

== Death ==
Rogers died on April 6, 1999, at his home in Columbia, South Carolina, at the age of 77.
