= 1982 South Carolina gubernatorial election =

- November 2, 1982
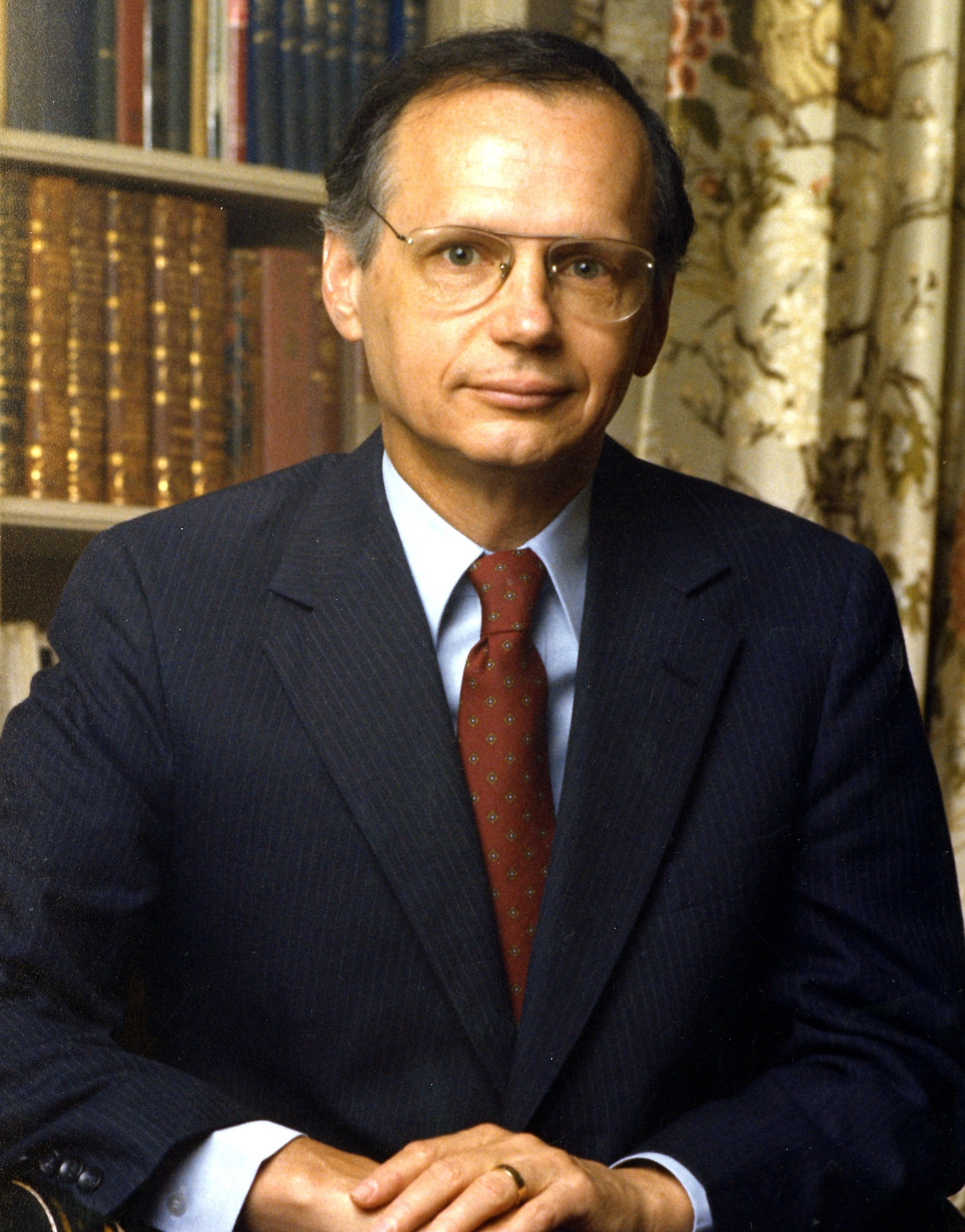

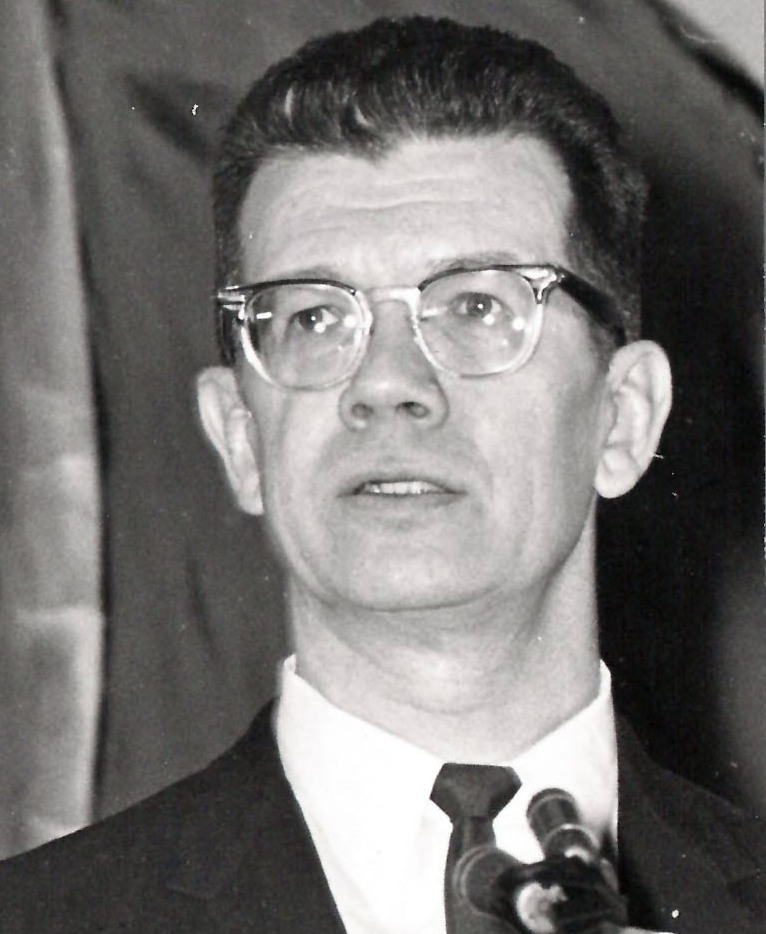
Nominee	Richard Riley	W. D. Workman Jr.
Party	Democratic	Republican
Popular vote	468,787	202,806
Percentage	69.78%	30.19%
- County results Riley: 50–60% 60–70% 70–80% 80–90%
Governor before election
Richard Riley
Democratic
Elected Governor
Richard Riley
Democratic

An election was held on November 2, 1982, to select the governor of South Carolina. The state constitution was amended by the voters on November 4, 1980 to allow for the governor to serve a second consecutive four-year term. Governor Richard Riley, the popular Democratic incumbent, easily defeated Republican W. D. Workman Jr. and became the first governor since Thomas Gordon McLeod in 1924 to be elected to a second consecutive term.

As of 2025, this is the only time a Democratic governor won a second term since the constitution was amended to allow for two consecutive terms. It was also the last election that a Democrat has carried every county in South Carolina, and the last South Carolina gubernatorial race where any candidate won every county.

== Democratic primary ==
Governor Richard Riley faced no opposition from South Carolina Democrats and avoided a primary election.

== Republican primary ==
The South Carolina Republican Party held their primary for governor in the summer of 1982. The lack of a Democratic primary for Governor gave the Republicans an opportunity to increase interest in their party, but the popularity of Governor Richard Riley prevented many additional voters from participating in the primary. W. D. Workman Jr. decisively defeated Roddy T. Martin and earned the right to face Riley in the general election.

Republican Primary
Candidate	Votes	%
W. D. Workman Jr.	17,128	81.8
Roddy T. Martin	3,816	18.2

== General election ==
The general election was held on November 2, 1982 and Richard Riley was elected as the next governor of South Carolina. Turnout decreased from the previous gubernatorial election because of the uncompetitive nature of the race. Riley won every County in the state.

South Carolina Gubernatorial Election, 1982
Party	Candidate	Votes	%	±%
Democratic	Richard Riley (incumbent)	468,787	69.78	+8.5
Republican	W. D. Workman Jr.	202,806	30.19	−7.5
No party	Write-Ins	184	0.0	−0.1
Majority		265,981	39.6	+16.0
Turnout		671,777	54.6	−2.6
Democratic hold				

== See also ==
- Governor of South Carolina
- List of governors of South Carolina
- South Carolina gubernatorial elections

Preceded by 1978	South Carolina gubernatorial elections	Succeeded by 1986
