= John Bolt Culbertson =

American politician (1908–1983)

Member of the South Carolina House of Representatives from Greenville County
- In office 1949–1950

Personal details
- Born: September 16, 1908 Laurens County, South Carolina, U.S.
- Died: March 21, 1983 (aged 74) Houston, Texas, U.S.
- Resting place: Greenville, South Carolina
- Education: University of South Carolina

Military service
- Allegiance: United States
- Branch/service: US Army
- Battles/wars: World War II

John Bolt Culbertson (September 16, 1908 – March 21, 1983) was a member of the South Carolina General Assembly, an advocate for the National Association for the Advancement of Colored People (NAACP), and one of the defense attorneys for the trial of the lynching of Willie Earle in Greenville, South Carolina.

== Early life ==
Born in Laurens County, South Carolina, John Bolt Culbertson attended the University of South Carolina, working as a waiter and as delivering papers to pay for tuition, graduating with his law degree in 1934. He worked for the Federal Bureau of Investigation (FBI) for two years as a special agent in the Midwest during J. Edgar Hoover's "War on Crime" Culbertson would later say his time in Detroit, Michigan, helped shape his views and sympathies for the working class.

In 1937, Culbertson started a law practice in Greenville, focusing on labor relations. He would work as an attorney until he was drafted into the Army in 1943, a period that also included an unsuccessful run for the South Carolina House of Representatives. In the Army, Culbertson served in the infantry and as an investigator throughout World War II.

== Career ==
In 1947, Culbertson served on a team of defense attorneys for the 28 men accused of lynching Willie Earle, who was accused of robbing and murdering a cab driver. This would be a turning point in Culbertson's struggle between his personal convictions against segregation and racism and his career. Later, Culbertson would say:

"I decided life wouldn't have any real meaning unless a man was willing to make a sacrifice for the things he believed in and to stand up for his convictions. ...If I was willing to give up my life - which I was - for the idea of freedom in other countries, I ought to be willing as a citizen to give real meaning to the slogans of democracy at home."

In 1948, Culbertson was elected to the South Carolina House of Representatives, where he served for one term during 1949 and 1950. He was involved in the passage of the first occupational disease law for the state. Culbertson would go on to run as a Democrat in a variety of races, including those of Greenville mayor (1951), U.S. Congress (1965 and 1980), U.S. Senate (1968, 1972, and 1978), and Governor (1974).

Although Culbertson's frequent campaigns did not result in his election, they reinforced his role as a champion for liberal causes in the state of South Carolina. Culbertson continued to work as an attorney in Greenville on cases of worker's compensation and labor unions in textile mills, including a case of worker's compensation against J.P. Stephens Co. Inc. (now WestPoint Home).

While never on the payroll, Culbertson played a major role in the South Carolina NAACP. He traveled among South Carolina's 46 counties, calling for integration and for people to join the organization. Culbertson also worked to try and force the courts to admit African-Americans into South Carolina's jury pools. In 1955, his membership drives saw 3,000 members join the state branch.

Culbertson died of cancer in Houston, Texas on March 21, 1983, after seeking treatment at M.D. Anderson Hospital.
