= 1962 United States Senate election in South Carolina =

- November 6, 1962
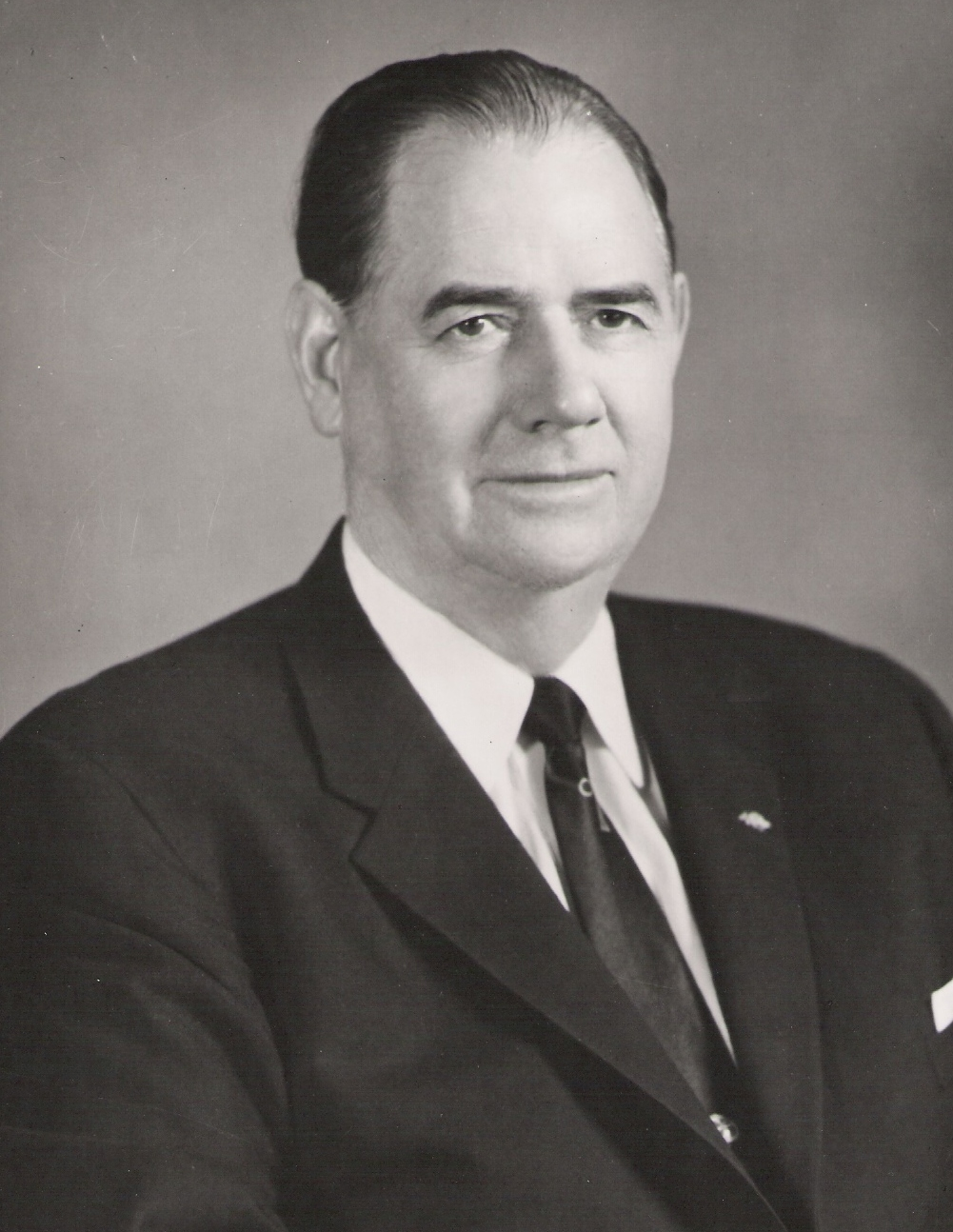

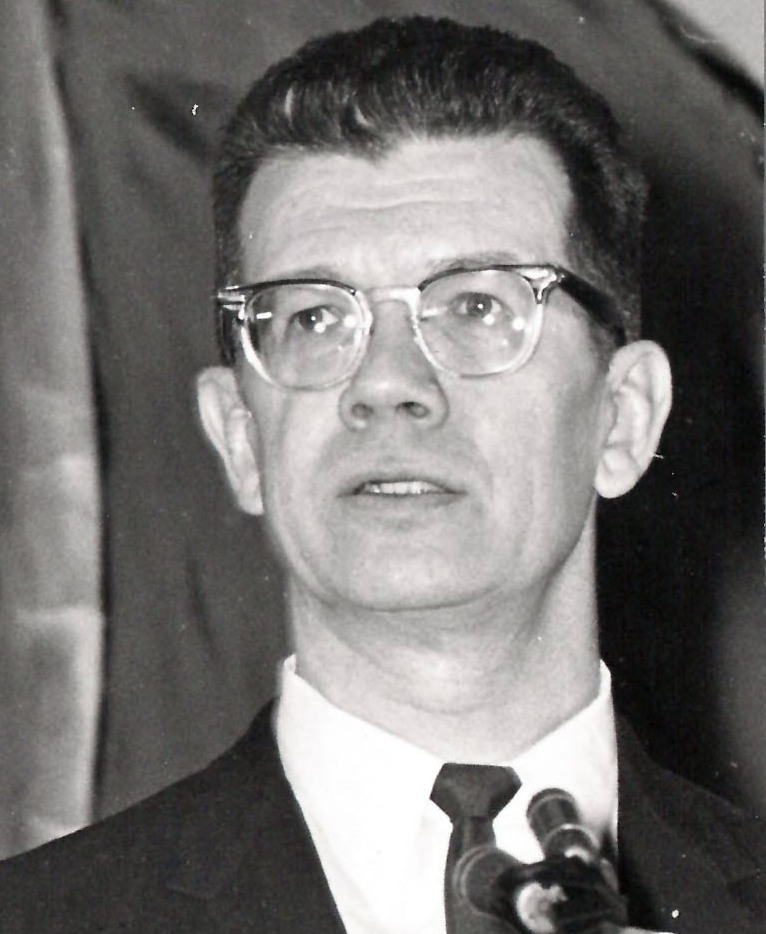
Nominee	Olin D. Johnston	W. D. Workman Jr.
Party	Democratic	Republican
Popular vote	178,712	133,930
Percentage	57.16%	42.84%
- County results Johnston: 50–60% 60–70% 70–80% 80–90% Workman: 50–60%
U.S. senator before election
Olin D. Johnston
Democratic
Elected U.S. Senator
Olin D. Johnston
Democratic

The 1962 South Carolina United States Senate election was held on November 6, 1962, to select the U.S. Senator from the state of South Carolina. Incumbent Democratic Senator Olin D. Johnston defeated Governor Fritz Hollings in the Democratic primary and Republican W. D. Workman Jr. in the general election.

== Democratic primary ==
The South Carolina Democratic Party held their primary on June 12, 1962. Olin D. Johnston, the incumbent Senator, faced stiff competition from Governor Fritz Hollings who argued that Johnston was too liberal and not representative of South Carolina interests. Johnston merely told the voters that he was doing what he thought was best for the agriculture and textile workers of the state. Hollings was decisively defeated by Johnston because Johnston used his position as Post Office and Civil Service Committee to build 40 new post offices in the state and thus demonstrate the pull he had in Washington to bring home the bacon.

South Carolina U.S. Senate Primary Election, 1962
Party	Candidate	Votes	%	±%
Democratic	Olin D. Johnston (incumbent)	216,918	66.3	
Democratic	Fritz Hollings	110,023	33.7	

== Republican primary ==
W. D. Workman Jr., a correspondent for the News and Courier, faced no opposition from South Carolina Republicans and avoided a primary election.

== General election campaign ==
Both Johnston and Workman supported segregation, so the campaign centered on the economic issues of the state. Workman tried to persuade the voters that Johnston's policies were socialist and that he was too closely aligned with the Kennedy administration. Johnston was a consistent supporter of socialized health care proposals and Workman was able to win considerable support from the medical establishment. However, the state's citizens were much poorer than that of the rest of the nation and Johnston's class based appeals made him a very popular figure for the downtrodden of both the white and black races. The competitive nature of this race foresaw the eventual rise of the Republican Party and that South Carolinians were growing increasingly suspicious of policies generated at the federal level.

== Election results ==
South Carolina U.S. Senate Election, 1962
Party	Candidate	Votes	%	±%
Democratic	Olin D. Johnston (incumbent)	178,712	57.16%	−25.05%
Republican	W. D. Workman Jr.	133,930	42.84%	+25.09%
No party	Write-Ins	5	0.00%	N/A
Majority		44,782	14.32%	−50.14%
Turnout		312,647	46.9	+8.8
Democratic hold				

== See also ==
- List of United States senators from South Carolina
- United States Senate elections, 1962
- United States Senate special election in South Carolina, 1956
