= Marshall Parker =

American politician

Member of the South Carolina State Senate from Oconee County
- In office 1957–1967

Personal details
- Born: Marshall Joyner Parker; April 25, 1922 Seaboard, North Carolina, U.S.
- Died: November 15, 2008 (aged 86) Seneca, South Carolina, U.S.
- Party: Republican (1966–2008); Democratic (before 1966)
- Spouse: Martha Parker (married 1943–2008, his death)
- Children: Four daughters
- Education: University of North Carolina at Chapel Hill
- Profession: Small Business Owner

Military service
- Branch/service: United States Marine Corps
- Battles/wars: Pacific Theatre of World War II

Marshall Joyner Parker (April 25, 1922 – November 15, 2008) was a Republican politician from the U.S. state of South Carolina.

== Background ==
Parker was born in Seaboard in Northampton County in northeastern North Carolina, to Carl Putnam Parker and Bertha Helen Joyner. Parker graduated in 1944 from the University of North Carolina at Chapel Hill. In his first year of college, Parker received the Freshmen Athlete of the Year Award. Later, he lettered in boxing and football. Immediately following graduation, he entered the United States Marine Corps and served in the Pacific Theatre during World War II.

== Political career ==
After military service, Parker moved briefly to Danville, Virginia, and then to Seneca, South Carolina. His political career began in Oconee County, South Carolina, where he served on the Seneca City Council and the Oconee County School Board. He was thereafter elected as a Democrat to the South Carolina State Senate, having represented Oconee County, which includes his hometown of Seneca. He remained in the state Senate from 1957 to 1967, in which capacity he was instrumental in the creation of his state's technical education system. He owned and operated Oconee Daries, a milk processing plant, which serviced the Golden Corner of South Carolina.

In 1966, Parker switched to Republican affiliation to run for the U.S. Senate. The other Senate seat from South Carolina was held at the time by the Democrat-turned-Republican Strom Thurmond, who had been elected as an Independent write-in candidate in 1954 and as a Democrat in 1960 but switched to the GOP in 1964 to support Barry M. Goldwater for the presidency. Parker did not challenge Thurmond in the Republican primary but instead attempted in a special election for a two-year term to succeed former senator Olin D. Johnston, who died in office in 1965. Meanwhile, Governor Donald S. Russell appointed himself to the Johnston seat. However, Russell was unseated in the 1966 Democratic primary for the Senate by former governor Fritz Hollings. Thereafter in the general election, Hollings narrowly defeated the Republican convert Marshall Parker.

Two years later in 1968, when Senator Hollings sought a full six-year term, he defeated Parker by a comfortable margin even though the Republican presidential nominee, Richard M. Nixon, had narrowly won the electoral votes of South Carolina against American Independent Party nominee George C. Wallace of Alabama and Democratic presidential nominee Vice President Hubert H. Humphrey of Minnesota.

Despite his twin defeats by Hollings for the U.S. Senate, Parker remained committed to the newly invigorated South Carolina Republican Party as well as the national GOP. He ran for Congress from South Carolina's 3rd congressional district but was defeated. In later years, he served in the senior leadership at the Small Business Administration under Presidents Nixon and Ronald W. Reagan.

== Later years ==
Marshall Parker retired to his Oconee County farm, where he raised beef cattle. He was a member of both the Veterans of Foreign Wars and the American Legion and a former member of the Seneca Lions, Sertoma, and Rotary International clubs. He was a former trustee and a past president of the Capital Foundation of Tri-County Technical College in Pendleton, South Carolina. The auditorium there is named in his honor.

Parker was an active United Methodist. He and his wife of sixty-five years, Martha Parker, had four daughters, nine grandchildren, and one great-grandchild at the time of his death. He died at the age of eighty-six at Oconee Medical Center in Seneca, South Carolina, after experiencing a year of declining health.

== See also ==
- List of American politicians who switched parties in office

Party political offices
Preceded by W. D. Workman Jr.	Republican nominee for U.S. Senator from South Carolina (Class 3); 1966, 1968	Succeeded by Gwenyfred Bush
