= Fritz Hollings =

American politician (1922–2019)

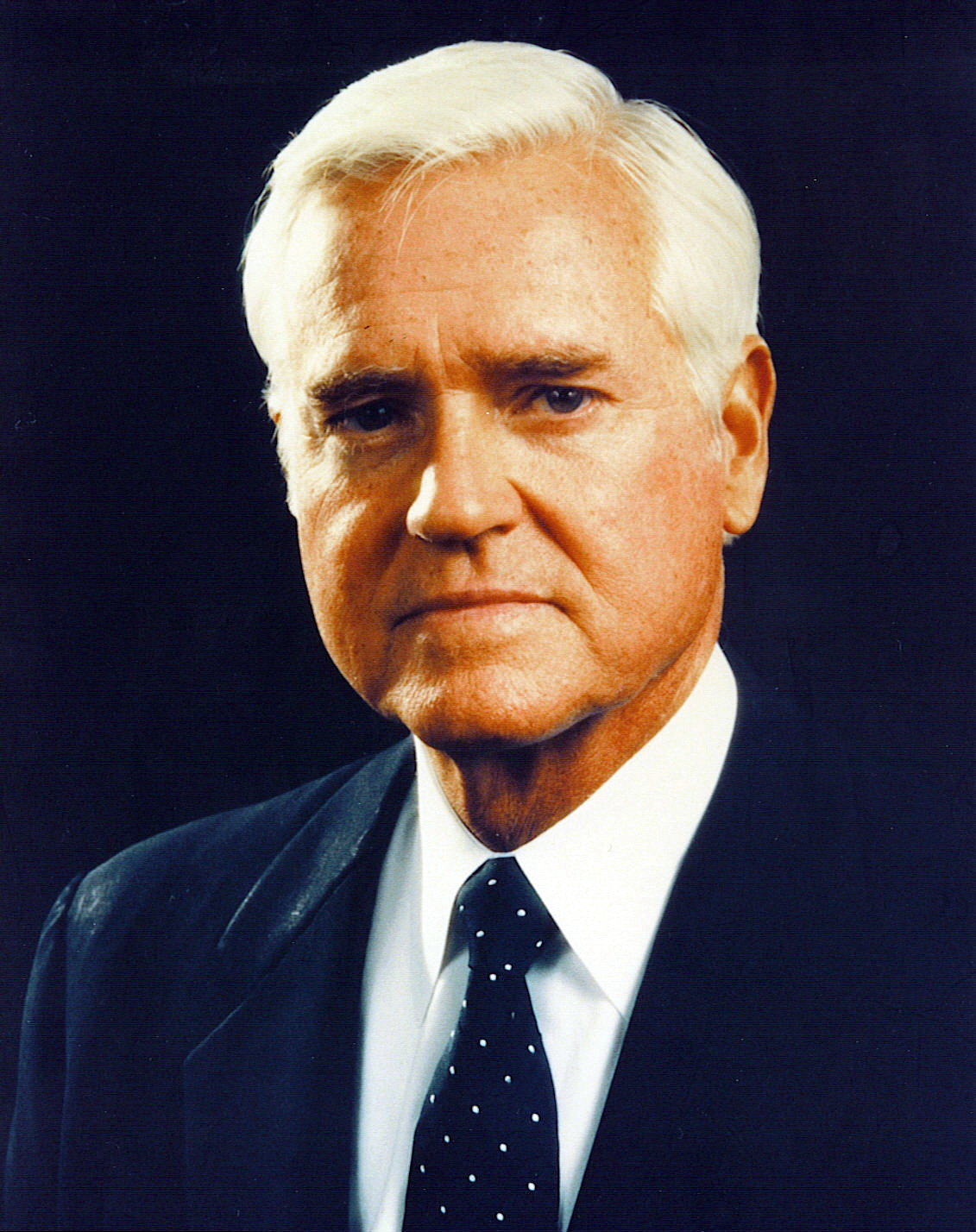

United States Senator from South Carolina
- In office November 9, 1966 – January 3, 2005
- Preceded by: Donald Russell
- Succeeded by: Jim DeMint
Senate positions
Chair of the Senate Commerce Committee
In office June 6, 2001 – January 3, 2003
Preceded by	John McCain
Succeeded by	John McCain
In office January 3, 2001 – January 20, 2001
Preceded by	John McCain
Succeeded by	John McCain
In office January 3, 1987 – January 3, 1995
Preceded by	John Danforth
Succeeded by	Larry Pressler
Chair of the Senate Budget Committee
In office May 8, 1980 – January 3, 1981
Preceded by	Edmund Muskie
Succeeded by	Pete Domenici

106th Governor of South Carolina
- In office January 20, 1959 – January 15, 1963
- Lieutenant: Burnet R. Maybank Jr.
- Preceded by: George Timmerman
- Succeeded by: Donald Russell

77th Lieutenant Governor of South Carolina
- In office January 18, 1955 – January 20, 1959
- Governor: George Timmerman
- Preceded by: George Timmerman
- Succeeded by: Burnet Maybank

Member of the South Carolina House of Representatives from Charleston County
- In office 1949–1954

Personal details
- Born: Ernest Frederick Hollings; January 1, 1922 Charleston, South Carolina, U.S.
- Died: April 6, 2019 (aged 97) Isle of Palms, South Carolina, U.S.
- Party: Democratic
- Spouses: Martha Salley (m. 1946; div. 1971); Rita Liddy (m. 1971; died 2012)
- Children: 4
- Education: The Citadel (BS); University of South Carolina, Columbia (LLB)

Military service
- Allegiance: United States
- Branch/service: United States Army
- Years of service: 1942–1945
- Rank: Captain
- Battles/wars: World War II
- Awards: Bronze Star Medal; European-African-Middle Eastern Campaign Medal
- Fritz Hollings's voice Hollings speaks in support of the Telephone Consumer Protection Act of 1991; Recorded November 7, 1991

Ernest Frederick "Fritz" Hollings (January 1, 1922 – April 6, 2019) was an American politician from the U.S. state of South Carolina. A member of the Democratic Party, he served as a member of the South Carolina House of Representatives representing Charleston County, South Carolina from 1949 to 1954, the 77th lieutenant governor of South Carolina from 1955 to 1959, the 106th governor of South Carolina from 1959 to 1963, and a member of the United States Senate from 1966 to 2005. He was the last Democrat to win a U.S. Senate seat in South Carolina until Annie Andrews was elected in 2026. At the time of his death, he was the oldest living former U.S. senator and the second-oldest living former American governor.

Born in Charleston, South Carolina, Hollings graduated from The Citadel in 1942 and joined a law practice in Charleston after attending the Joseph F. Rice School of Law. During World War II, he served as an artillery officer in campaigns in North Africa and Europe. After the war, Hollings successively won election to the South Carolina House of Representatives, as lieutenant governor, and as governor. He sought election to the Senate in 1962 but was defeated by incumbent U.S. Senate member Olin D. Johnston. Johnston died in 1965, and the following year Hollings won a special election to serve the remainder of Johnston's term.

Hollings remained popular and continually won re-election, becoming one of the longest-serving members of the United States Senate in history. He also served alongside Democrat-turned-Republican senator Strom Thurmond for 36 years, making them the longest-serving duo in U.S. Senate history. Hollings sought the Democratic nomination in the 1984 presidential election but dropped out of the race after the New Hampshire presidential primary. He declined to seek re-election in 2004 and was succeeded by Republican Jim DeMint.

== Early life ==
Hollings was born in Charleston, South Carolina, the son of Wilhelmine Dorothea Meyer (1888–1982) and Adolph Gevert Hollings, Sr. (1882–1940). He was of German descent. Hollings was raised at 338 President St. in the Hampton Park Terrace neighborhood from age 10 until he enrolled in college.

== Education and personal life ==
Hollings graduated from The Citadel in 1942, receiving a Bachelor of Arts degree. He achieved a Bachelor of Laws in 1947 after one year and nine months at the University of South Carolina, and joined a law practice in Charleston. Hollings was a member of the Pi Kappa Phi fraternity. He was a member of the German Friendly Society of Charleston from 1976 to 1991.

Hollings was then married to Rita Liddy "Peatsy" Hollings from August 21, 1971, until her death in October 2012. He had four children (Michael, Helen, Patricia Salley, and Ernest III) with his first wife, Martha Patricia Salley Hollings, who he first married on March 30, 1946. He was a Lutheran. In addition, Fritz and Patricia had two sons who died.

Hollings served as an officer in the United States Army's 353rd and 457th Artillery units from 1942 to 1945, during World War II, and was awarded the Bronze Star Medal for meritorious service in direct support of combat operations from December 13, 1944, to May 1, 1945, in France and Germany. He received the European–African–Middle Eastern Campaign Medal with five Bronze Service Stars for participation in the Tunisia, Southern France, Rome-Arno, and Central Europe Campaigns.

== Political career ==
Hollings served three terms in the South Carolina House of Representatives from 1949 to 1954. In 1950, following the notorious lynching of Willie Earle, Hollings authored a law that mandated the death penalty for lynching. No lynchings occurred in South Carolina after that law was enacted. After only one term, Hollings's colleagues elected him Speaker Pro Tempore in 1951 and 1953. He was subsequently elected Lieutenant Governor of South Carolina in 1954, and Governor of South Carolina in 1958 at the age of 36.

=== Governor of South Carolina (1959–1963) ===
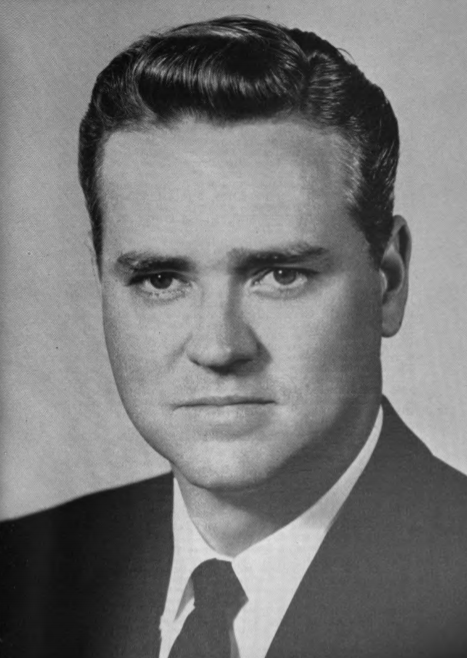
Hollings as Governor of South Carolina.

As governor of South Carolina from January 20, 1959, to January 15, 1963, Hollings worked to improve the state's educational system, helping to bring more industry and employment opportunities to the state. His term in office saw the establishment of the state's technical education system and its educational television network. He also called for and achieved significant increases in teachers' salaries, bringing them closer to the regional average. At the 1961 Governor's Conference on Business, Industry, Education and Agriculture in Columbia, South Carolina, he declared, "Today, in our complex society, education is the cornerstone upon which economic development must be built – and prosperity assured."

During Hollings's term as governor, the Confederate battle flag was flown above the South Carolina State House underneath the U.S. and state flags. The battle flag was placed over the dome in 1962 by a concurrent resolution of the state legislature during the commemoration of the Civil War centennial. The resolution failed to designate a time for its removal. In 2000 the state legislature voted to move the flag from above the state house to a Confederate soldiers' monument in front of the building, where it remained until 2015, when a bill was passed into law following the Charleston church shooting, racially motivated, which directed its removal.

Hollings did little to either support or oppose the civil rights movement as governor, and instead took pride in the lack of civil rights violence that occurred in the state. In his last address to the General Assembly on January 9, 1963, ahead of the peaceful admission to Clemson University of its first African American student, Harvey Gantt, Hollings declared: "As we meet, South Carolina is running out of courts ... this General Assembly must make clear South Carolina's choice, a government of laws rather than a government of men ... This should be done with dignity. It should be done with law and order."

Hollings oversaw the last executions in South Carolina before Furman v. Georgia, a decision by the Supreme Court of the United States, which temporarily banned capital punishment. During his term, eight inmates were put to death by electric chair. The last was rapist Douglas Thorne, on April 20, 1962.

He sought the Democratic nomination for a seat in the United States Senate in 1962 but lost to incumbent Olin D. Johnston.

According to one study, Hollings was the first of a series of “moderately liberal” Democratic governors who would lead South Carolina for the next 16 years.

=== United States Senator (1966–2005) ===
==== Early Senate career ====
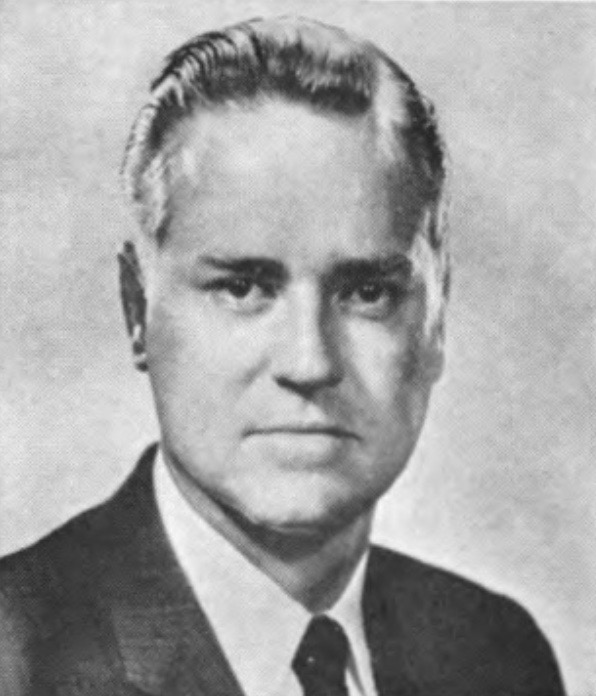
Hollings in 1969

Johnston died on April 18, 1965. Hollings' successor as governor, Donald S. Russell, resigned in order to accept appointment to the Senate seat. In the summer of 1966, Hollings defeated Russell in the Democratic primary for the remaining two years of the term. He then narrowly won the special election on November 8, 1966, defeating Democrat-turned-Republican Marshall Parker by 11,758 votes, and was sworn in shortly thereafter. He gained seniority on other newly elected U.S. senators who would have to wait until January 1967 to take the oath of office. In 1967, he was one of eleven senators who voted against the nomination of Thurgood Marshall to become the first black justice on the U.S. Supreme Court. In 1968, Hollings won his first full Senate term, again defeating Parker this time by 155,280 votes.

For over 36 years (from November 9, 1966 to January 3, 2003), he served alongside Democratic-turned-Republican Strom Thurmond, making them the longest-serving state delegation duo in history of the United States Senate to date. Thurmond and Hollings generally had a good relationship despite their sometimes sharp philosophical differences, and frequently collaborated on legislation and projects for South Carolina. Hollings was also the thirteenth-longest-serving member of the United States Senate.

In 1970, Hollings authored The Case Against Hunger: A Demand for a National Policy, acknowledging the Reverend I. DeQuincey Newman and Sister Mary Anthony for opening his eyes to the despair caused by hunger and helping him realize that he must do something about it. Hollings made headlines the year before when he toured poverty-stricken areas of South Carolina, often referred to as his "Hunger Tours". He was accused of drawing unwanted attention to South Carolina while other states, both northern and southern, also faced extreme poverty. Hollings knew South Carolina was not alone in its struggle and thought that if any politician was going to investigate hunger in South Carolina, it was going to at least be a South Carolinian. After a tour of an East Charleston slum, he said, "I don't want Romney and Kennedy coming here to look at my slums. As a matter of fact when I get caught up with my work, I think I may go look at the slums of Boston." For his efforts, Hollings was also accused of "scheming for the Negro vote". Hollings, who had seen plenty of white hunger and poverty and slums on his tours, responded, "You just don't make political points on hunger. The poor aren't registered to vote and they won't vote." In February 1969, however, Hollings testified as to what he had seen on his fact-finding tours in front of the United States Senate Select Committee on Nutrition and Human Needs. Charleston's News and Courier (now The Post and Courier) reported that "Senators, members of the press corps and visitors packed in the hearing room watched and listened in disbelief as Hollings detailed dozens of tragically poignant scenes of human suffering in his state." Hollings recommended to the committee that free food stamps from the Supplemental Nutrition Assistance Program be distributed to the most needy, and just over a day later, U.S. Senate member George McGovern from South Dakota announced that free food stamps would be distributed in South Carolina as part of a national pilot program for feeding the hungry.

Hollings and his first wife separated in 1970 and divorced in 1971. Their children lived with their mother, and Hollings never discussed the reason for the divorce. Later that year, he married Rita Liddy "Peatsy" Hollings (born 1935), who was 13 years his junior. She had joined his administrative staff in 1967. It was her first and his second marriage. They were married 41 years until her death in 2012.

In the 1970s, Hollings joined with fellow U.S. Senate members Ted Kennedy from Massachusetts and Henry M. Jackson from Washington in a press conference to oppose President of the United States Gerald Ford's request that Congress end Richard Nixon's price controls on domestic oil, which had helped to cause the gasoline lines during the 1973 oil crisis. Hollings said he believed ending the price controls (as was eventually done in 1981) would be a "catastrophe" that would cause "economic chaos".

In February 1970, during a session of debate on federal aid to school districts serving children living in public housing units, Hollings asked U.S. Senate member Jacob Javits from New York if he would support the anti-busing amendment given that it was based on New York law.

In September 1970, during a speech at the University of Georgia in Athens, Georgia, Hollings declared that the United States could not afford such "leadership by political bamboozle", calling on Americans to ignore the voices of discord and unite for "meaningful changes" in society. Hollings said President Nixon had led the U.S. down a "clamorous road of drift and division" and criticized the "ranting rhetoric" of Vice President of the United States Spiro Agnew. Hollings attributed the principal blame for the disunity of the U.S. on special interest groups and "impatient minority blocs" that had shouted "non negotiable demands". Hollings linked former President Johnson and President Nixon with having both "attacked the politics of the problem rather than the problems themselves".

In February 1971, Hollings introduced Ted Kennedy from Massachusetts in Charleston, South Carolina, ahead of his remarks calling for an end to the Vietnam War. Hollings disclosed that Kennedy had sought his advice on how to answer reporters' questions regarding a possible presidential campaign and that Kennedy believed his visit would spark speculation on the part of reporters about a campaign regardless of what he said.

In November 1971, Hollings announced his opposition to the nomination of Earl Butz for United States Secretary of Agriculture.

In 1972, Hollings and Republican U.S. Senate member William B. Saxbe from Ohio sponsored a resolution bestowing early United States recognition on Bangladesh as the Nixon administration sought a policy of delaying recognition until "there were commensurate diplomatic benefits to the United States."

In 1977, Hollings was one of five Democratic U.S. Senate members to vote against the nomination of Ray Marshall as United States Secretary of Labor.

In early 1979, United States Secretary of State Cyrus Vance sought permission from a Senate Appropriations subcommittee to transfer $2 million in funds for the American Embassy to the new unofficial American Institute in Taiwan. Hollings was one of four members of the committee to oppose Vance's request during the latter's appearance before the subcommittee and Hollings later sent a letter to Vance declining the request. Hollings explained that "a smooth transition to unofficial relations may be threatened" in the event of funds not being transferred to the American Institute before the American Embassy in Taiwan ceased its function by its designated date of March 1. Hollings's opposition was considered unusual given that most requests were approved and State Department officials publicly stated their wishes for Hollings and his colleagues to drop their opposition in the face of Taiwan's reluctant agreement to setting up "nongovernmental body in Washington" that would serve as the counterpart to the American Institute in Taipei.

Hollings opposed legislation in 1979 that would admit additional ethnic Chinese refugees amid increased concern regarding moves by the Vietnamese government.

In August 1979, Hollings announced his opposition to the United States-Soviet Union nuclear arms treaty, saying the treaty should be defeated unless amended with a reduction of Soviet military power. His proposal was believed to stir Russian disapproval of the treaty if implemented. Hollings also made an unsuccessful attempt to persuade the United States Senate Committee on the Budget to add $2.6 billion for a recommendation for military spending that would be included in Congress's second concurrent resolution on the budget.

==== Presidential candidate ====
Hollings unsuccessfully sought the Democratic nomination for President of the United States in the 1984 United States presidential election. Hollings's wit and experience, as well as his call for a budget freeze, won him some positive attention, but his relatively conservative record alienated liberal Democrats, and he was never really noticed in a field dominated by former U.S. Senate member Walter Mondale of Minnesota, who served in the U.S. Senate from 1964 to 1976 and as Vice President of the United States from 1977 to 1981, and U.S. Senate members John Glenn of Ohio and Gary Hart of Colorado. Hollings dropped out two days after losing badly in the New Hampshire presidential primary, and endorsed Hart a week later. His disdain for his competitors sometimes showed. He notably referred to Mondale as a "lapdog" and to former astronaut Glenn as a "Sky King" who was "confused in his capsule".

==== Later Senate career ====
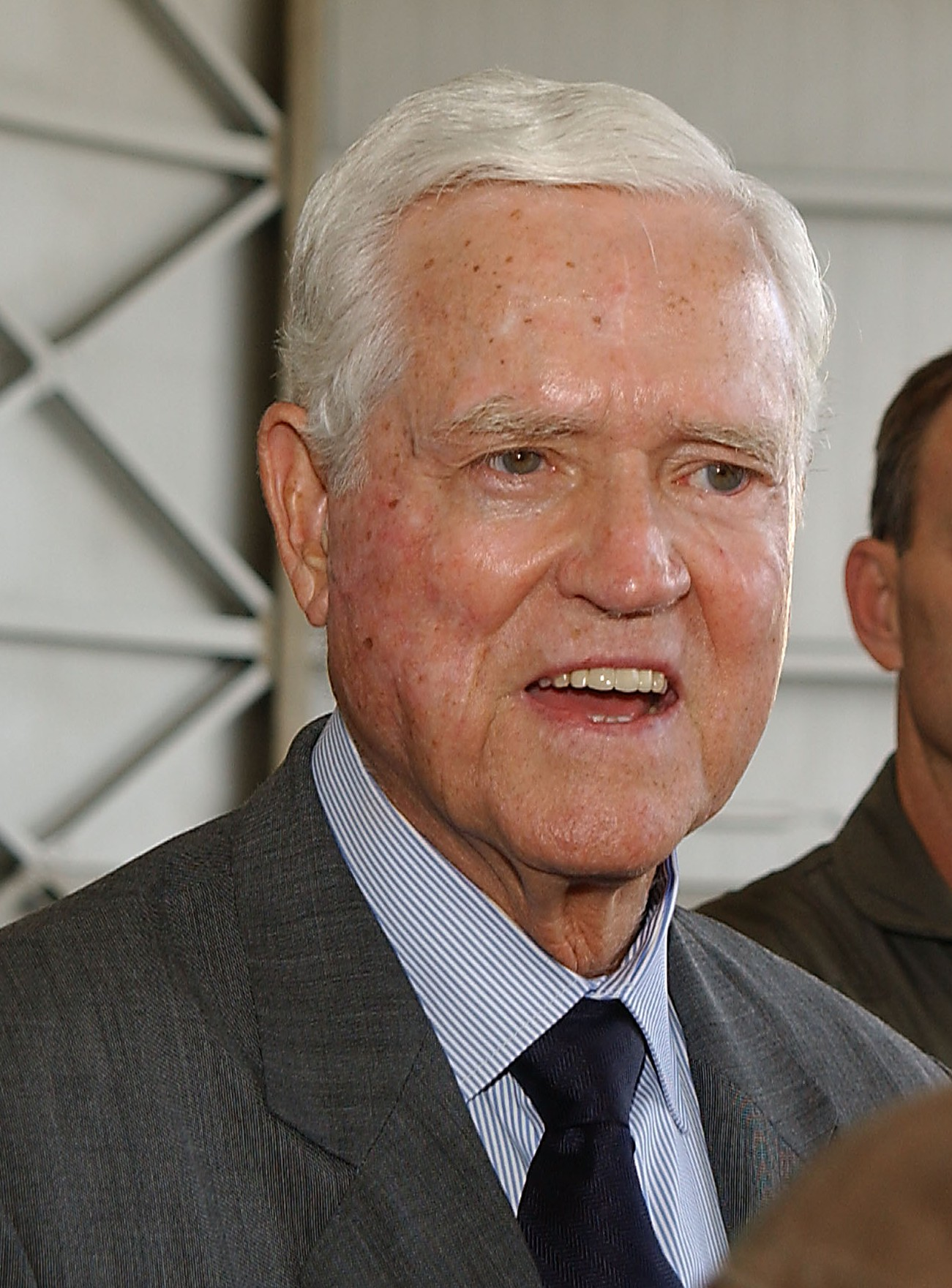
Senator Ernest Hollings

On March 24, 1981, Hollings introduced legislation that if passed would restore the military draft with limited deferments and exemptions and stipulating that men aged 18 to 22 years old would be required to spend nine months of active service for basic training that potentially would precede reserve duty. Hollings's proposal granted deferments "to people on active duty, in the reserves or in advanced Reserve Officers Training Corps study; surviving sons or brothers of those killed in war or missing in action; conscientious objectors and ministers; doctors and others in vital health professions, and judges of courts of record and elected officials". Hollings stated that recruiting for the armed forces had fallen short of requirements by an estimated 23,000 people in 1979 and that he believed the draft applying to women "should be across the board" due to the issue continuing to be debated between the public and the courts.

In 1981, Hollings apologized to fellow Democratic U.S. Senate member Howard Metzenbaum of Ohio after Hollings referred to him as the "senator from B'nai B'rith" on the floor. Metzenbaum, who was Jewish, raised a question of privilege and Hollings's remarks were stricken from the record.

In March 1985, the Senate Budget Committee approved a proposal sponsored by Hollings freezing military spending by not allowing any growth above inflation in fiscal year 1986 and bestowing three percent hikes in the following two years, Hollings after the vote saying that a pattern had been set for similar action on other budget items and predicted that the Budget Committee would also go against another Reagan administration supported position by freezing Social Security cost of living increases.

On May 1, 1985, the United States Senate Committee on Commerce, Science and Transportation rejected an amendment to a bill reauthorizing the Federal Communications Commission prohibiting public television stations from swapping channels with commercial stations, Hollings afterward stating that the vote was "a tragic abdication by Congress of its over 60-year-old responsibility to protect the public's interest in broadcasting".

In October 1985, Hollings and Republican United States Senate members Phil Gramm of Texas and Warren Rudman of New Hampshire sponsored an amendment to establish a budget deficit ceiling that would decline to zero by 1991 that was attached to a bill raising the debt limit of the national government by more than $250 billion. The amendment was approved by a vote of 75 to 24 and was stated as a possible prelude to a balanced budget in five years without a tax increase by United States Secretary of the Treasury James Baker.

During the 1988 Democratic Party presidential primaries, Hollings endorsed Jesse Jackson.

In October 1989, Hollings announced from his Washington office that he would request the United States Government Accountability Office investigate efforts by the Federal Emergency Management Agency to provide timely assistance and funds to victims of Hurricane Hugo the previous month. Hollings charged FEMA with "stonewalling, fretting and filling out forms" and called on the federal government to become more active in trying to relieve areas devastated by Hurricane Hugo.

In April 1990, Hollings planned the compiling of the Senate Budget Committee to vote on a cut in the Federal Insurance Contributions Act, an idea initially forwarded at the end of the previous year by fellow Democratic senator Daniel Patrick Moynihan as a way of making Congress address what he considered to be a serious problem in the management of the Social Security trust funds. Hollings sought a revenue figure which reflected the $36 billion tax cut through a rollback of Social Security payroll taxes increases that were scheduled to take effect January 1 and confirmed he would ask his colleagues on the budget committee to remove the trust funds from the budget deficit calculation and vote on the 1991 budget including a $300 billion deficit. Hollings's plan included a five percent value-added tax on goods and services in addition to a ten percent oil import fee as well as an increase in the top income tax rate to thirty-three percent among wealthiest taxpayers. The goal was considered an uphill battle where Hollings could be outmaneuvered in committee with parliamentary tactics that would result in the precluding of a straight up-or-down vote on the Social Security tax cut. Acknowledging this, Hollings said, "They may try to block me. But we will find a bill by God to cut Social Security taxes. There will be a vote."

In January 1991, Hollings joined most Democratic senators in voting against a resolution authorizing war against Iraq.

In 1993, Hollings told reporters he attended international summits because, "Everybody likes to go to Geneva. I used to do it for the United States Convention on the Law of the Sea conferences and you'd find those potentates from down in Africa, you know, rather than eating each other, they'd just come up and get a good square meal in Geneva." Hollings had previously caused controversy when responding to Yoshio Sakurauchi's commentary that Americans are lazy and illiterate. Hollings replied, "You should draw a mushroom cloud and put underneath it, 'Made in America by lazy and illiterate Americans and tested in Japan'."

Hollings remained very popular in South Carolina over the years, even as the state became increasingly friendly to Republicans at the national level. In his first three bids for a full term, he never won less than 60 percent of the vote. In 1992, however, he faced an unexpectedly close race against former U.S. House of Representatives member Thomas F. Hartnett in what was otherwise a very good year for Democrats nationally. Hartnett had represented the Charleston area in Congress from 1981 to 1987, thus making him Hollings's congressman. His appeal in the South Carolina Lowcountry – traditionally a swing region at the state level – enabled him to hold Hollings to only fifty percent of the vote.

In his last Senate race in 1998, Hollings faced Republican U.S. House of Representatives member Bob Inglis. One of the more heated moments of the race was a newspaper interview in which Hollings referred to Inglis as a "goddamn skunk". Hollings was re-elected by 75,139 votes.

On January 7, 2003, Hollings introduced the controversial Universal National Service Act of 2006, which would require all men and women aged 18–26 (with some exceptions) to perform a year of military service.

By 2003, Hollings realized that no Democrat could win statewide office in South Carolina's current political climate—not even as entrenched an incumbent as himself. On August 4, 2003, he announced that he would not run for re-election in 2004. Republican Jim DeMint, who was a member of the U.S. House of Representatives member from 1999 to 2005, succeeded him. In the 2004 Democratic primary, he stumped for John Kerry's primary bid.

In his later career, Hollings was moderate politically but was supportive of many civil and political rights bills. In 1982, he voted for re-authorizing the Voting Rights Act of 1965. However, in 1967 he was one of the 11 U.S. Senate members who voted against the confirmation of Thurgood Marshall, the first black Supreme Court of the United States justice. Hollings later voted in favor of the unsuccessful Robert Bork Supreme Court nomination and also for the successful Clarence Thomas Supreme Court nomination.

On fiscal issues, he was generally conservative, and was one of the primary sponsors of the Gramm–Rudman–Hollings Balanced Act, an attempt to enforce limits on government spending.

Hollings and Howell Heflin of Alabama were the only two Democratic U.S. Senate members to vote against the Family and Medical Leave Act of 1993.

==== Entertainment industry ====
As a senator, Hollings supported legislation in the interests of the established media distribution industry (such as the proposed "Consumer Broadband and Digital Television Promotion Act"). His hard-line support of various client-serve model computer restrictions such as Digital rights management and Trusted Computing led the Fritz chip (Trusted Platform Module, a microchip that enforces such restrictions) to be nicknamed after him. Hollings introduced the Consumer Broadband and Digital Television Promotion Act, a draft of the later CBDTPA, which would have mandated "manufacturers of all electronic devices and software to embed government approved copy protection technology in their products". Hollings also sponsored the Online Personal Privacy Act. According to OpenSecrets, between 1997 and 2002, Hollings received more than $300,000 from the entertainment industry.

Hollings was nicknamed the "Senator from Disney" for his lobbying in behalf of the entertainment industry, including industry groups such as the Recording Industry Association of America and the Motion Picture Association.

== Political Positions ==
=== Racial Issues ===
As with many other entrenched southern politicians, Hollings' views on racial issues shifted over the course of his political career.

Prior to the passage of the 1964 Civil Rights Act, Hollings was generally perceived as a pragmatist and a racial moderate who nevertheless seldom questioned the merit of Jim Crow segregation. In his rhetoric, he would frequently equate the NAACP with the Ku Klux Klan as tantamount evils, though his administration would monitor the former more heavily.

Hours after having been elected to the state legislature, Hollings paid a visit to an African-American elementary school in his district. As legislator, he gained prominence as the architect of a 3 percent consumption tax intended to fund public education. The revenue proceeds from this would deliver substantial improvements to black educational facilities in the state, though they remained palpably inferior to their white counterparts. In response to backlash from reactionaries, Hollings defended the policy as an example of 'constructive conservatism', arguing that southern states could only diminish the case for integration credibly if they improved the quality of black facilities.

As governor, Hollings sought to avoid the racial unrest that had consumed other southern states following the landmark Brown v. Board of Education ruling (to which he objected), believing such disorder to deter business investment. As such, while he refused to privatise or defund any public school that had been forced to integrate by the judiciary, he took no steps to promote integration himself. Instead, he concerned himself with ensuring that integration was done in an orderly manner. In contrast to other southern governments, the Hollings administration permitted the civil rights movement to organise non-violent demonstrations in South Carolina. However, these protests were strictly monitored by the police, and their demands were promptly ignored by the state legislature.

On numerous occasions, he spurned Mississippi governor Ross Barnett's demands that he take a stronger stand against integration. In response to widespread rioting over the admission of James Meredith to the state university, Hollings described the situation as 'Mississippi's problem' and refused to comment further - a decision which prompted criticism from various media outlets as threatening southern solidarity. Following this, Barnett then demanded Hollings lead a motorcade demonstration between the two states, a suggestion the South Carolinian ridiculed. The governor instead ordered his legal counsellors to devise a 7-page plan to stably desegregate universities in his own state, should it ever be ordered.

In a 1960 meeting with Orangeburg demonstrators, Hollings confessed that while he was disinterested in altering segregationist policy for the foreseeable future, he was beginning to doubt their optimality. In his final address to the state legislature, the governor urged South Carolinians to "realize the lesson of 100 years ago and move on for the good of South Carolina and our United States" - welcoming Harvey Gantt's admission to Clemson University.

Following the passage of the Voting Rights Act, Hollings distanced himself from his previous support of segregation. It remains ambiguous as to whether this was an opportunistic move in order to attract the black vote, or whether he had a genuine change of mind.

In his 1968 senate campaign, Hollings’ performance in every county almost always paralleled the combined total of the Humphrey and Wallace vote in that year’s presidential election. Because his Republican opponent, Marshall Parker, was closely aligned with Thurmond, Hollings was able to emphasise his criticisms of the Johnson administration without fear of losing black and liberal voters.

On several issues, he aligned himself with the state's white supremacist majority while defending his position on pragmatic grounds. For instance:

- He adopted Thurmond’s criticisms of the great society, but on the basis that they diverted funds from measures that would be more effective in alleviating poverty.
- He promoted George Wallace’s presidential campaign, but on the basis that Wallace had superior foreign policy.
- He emphasised his conservatism on the racially-charged issue of law and order, but fell short of outwardly endorsing discrimination.
- He voted against the confirmation of Thurgood Marshall to the Supreme Court of the United States, but only listed disagreements over ‘judicial philosophy’ which he never specified.

== Post Senatorial life and death ==
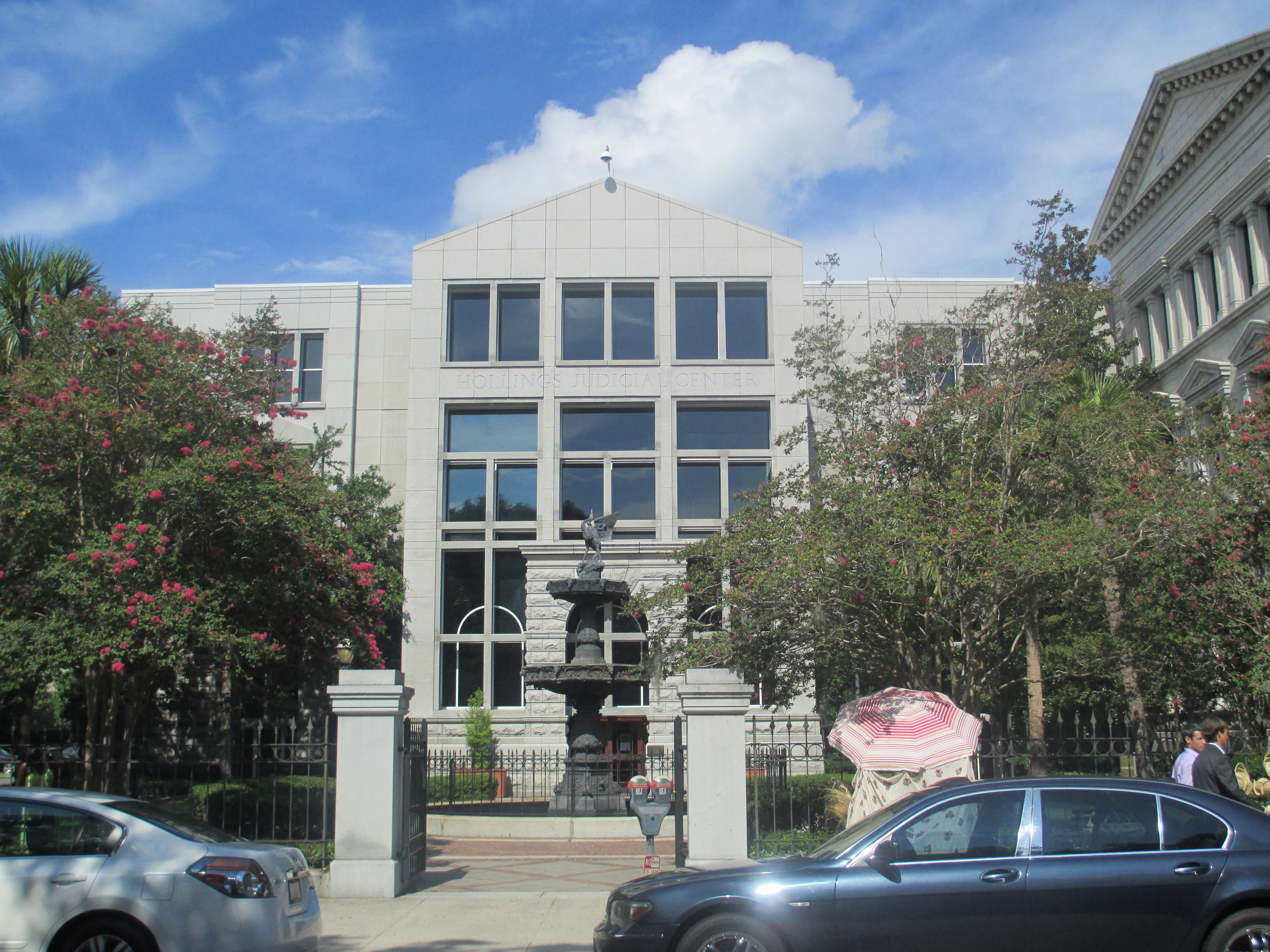
The J. Waties Waring Judicial Center at 83 Meeting Street in Downtown Charleston was formerly named the Hollings Judicial Center for the former governor and senator.

In retirement, Hollings wrote opinion editorials for newspapers in South Carolina and was a regular contributor to the HuffPost. His opinion editorials were also published every week in EconomyInCrisis.org, an independent protectionist news blog. In 2008, the University of South Carolina Press published Making Government Work, a book authored by Hollings with Washington, D.C., journalist Kirk Victor, imparting Hollings' view on the changes needed in Washington. Among other things, the book recommended a dramatic decrease in the amount of campaign spending. It also attacked free trade policies as inherently destructive, suggesting that certain protectionist measures built the United States and that only a few parties actually benefited from free trade, such as large manufacturing corporations.

Hollings voted for Barack Obama in the 2008 presidential election. In 2009, he said that Obama could face war crimes charges for continuing policies of the George W. Bush Administration, including civilian deaths through drone warfare. He later criticized Obama over the 2011 State of the Union Address, stating Obama was 'talking in the State of the Union and all he’s making is a campaign talk for re-election." He expressed frustration with Obama over the decline of manufacturing in the United States. He indicated that, though he wished to continue supporting Obama, he was inclined to back "Someone with experience" in the next election.

Hollings was also on the board of advisors as a distinguished visiting professor of Law with the Charleston School of Law. He delivered the commencement address to the first graduating class there on May 19, 2007.

On April 6, 2019, Hollings died at the age of 97 at his home in Isle of Palms, South Carolina, following a period of declining health. Former U.S. Senate member Joe Biden of Delaware, who was U.S. Vice President from 2009 to 2017, and later U.S. President from 2021 to 2025, delivered the eulogy at his funeral.

== Legacy ==
=== Hollings Cancer Center ===
The Hollings Cancer Center at the Medical University of South Carolina, in Charleston, was established in 1993.

=== Hollings Center for International Dialogue ===
Hollings helped to establish the Hollings Center for International Dialogue, an organization that promotes dialogue between the United States and Turkey, the nations of the Middle East, North Africa, and Southwest Asia, and other countries with predominantly Muslim populations in order to open channels of communication, deepen cross-cultural understanding, expand people-to-people contacts, and generate new thinking on important international issues.

=== NOAA Ernest F. Hollings Scholarship ===
During his career, Hollings campaigned to establish National Oceanic and Atmospheric Administration (NOAA) and is known as "the father of NOAA." NOAA was established in 1970. The NOAA Ernest F. Hollings Scholarship was established in 2005.

The award is considered prestigious and highly competitive. Appointees are selected based upon merit, including academic record (30%), career interest (30%), references and recommendations (20%), and honors and extra-curricular activities (20%). Up to 150 exceptional undergraduate students are appointed annually for a two-year term. Each receives a ten-week internship with NOAA and up to $40,000 in funding, including a $9,500 stipend during the final two years of their baccalaureate degrees in NOAA-related sciences. 75% of scholars attend graduate school following their appointment.

=== Ernest F. Hollings National Advocacy Center ===
The national training center for the United States Department of Justice is named for Hollings and sits on the USC campus.

=== Ernest F. Hollings Special Collections Library ===
In 2008, the University of South Carolina announced their new library would be named The Ernest F. Hollings Special Collections Library. The $18-million library was built behind the Thomas Cooper Library and is home to The Irvin Department of Rare Books & Special Collections, South Carolina Political Collections, and Digital Collections. It is also home to the Dorothy B. Smith Reading Room.

== Electoral history ==
South Carolina U.S. Senate Special Election 1966
Party	Candidate	Votes	%	±%
Democratic	Fritz Hollings	223,790	51.35	
Republican	Marshall Parker	212,032	48.65	

South Carolina U.S. Senate Election 1968
Party	Candidate	Votes	%	±%
Democratic	Fritz Hollings (incumbent)	404,060	61.89	
Republican	Marshall Parker	248,780	38.11	

South Carolina U.S. Senate Election 1974
Party	Candidate	Votes	%	±%
Democratic	Fritz Hollings (incumbent)	356,126	69.50	
Republican	Gwen Bush	146,645	28.62	
Independent	Harold Hough	9,626	1.88	

South Carolina U.S. Senate Election 1980
Party	Candidate	Votes	%	±%
Democratic	Fritz Hollings (incumbent)	612,556	70.37	
Republican	Marshall Mays	257,946	29.63	

South Carolina U.S. Senate Election 1986
Party	Candidate	Votes	%	±%
Democratic	Fritz Hollings (incumbent)	463,354	63.10	
Republican	Henry McMaster	261,394	35.60	

South Carolina U.S. Senate Election 1992
Party	Candidate	Votes	%	±%
Democratic	Fritz Hollings (incumbent)	591,030	50.07	
Republican	Thomas Hartnett	554,175	46.95	
Libertarian	Mark Johnson	22,962	1.95	

South Carolina U.S. Senate Election 1998
Party	Candidate	Votes	%	±%
Democratic	Fritz Hollings (incumbent)	562,791	52.68	
Republican	Bob Inglis	488,132	45.69	
Libertarian	Richard T. Quillian	16,987	1.59	

== See also ==
- Hollings Manufacturing Extension Partnership (MEP)
- List of members of the American Legion

== Sources ==
- Ballantyne, David T. New Politics in the Old South: Ernest F. Hollings in the Civil Rights Era (U of South Carolina Press, 2016). 206 pp
- Minchin, Timothy J., "An Uphill Fight: Ernest F. Hollings and the Struggle to Protect the South Carolina Textile Industry, 1959–2005", South Carolina Historical Magazine, 109 (July 2008), 187–211.

Party political offices
Preceded by George Bell Timmerman, Jr.	Democratic nominee for Lieutenant Governor of South Carolina; 1954	Succeeded by Burnet R. Maybank Jr.
Preceded by George Bell Timmerman, Jr.	Democratic nominee for Governor of South Carolina; 1958	Succeeded by Donald S. Russell
Preceded by Olin D. Johnston	Democratic nominee for Senator from South Carolina (Class 3); 1966, 1968, 1974, 1980, 1986, 1992, 1998	Succeeded by Inez Tenenbaum
Political offices
Preceded by George Bell Timmerman, Jr.	Lieutenant Governor of South Carolina; 1955–1959	Succeeded by Burnet R. Maybank Jr.
Preceded by George Bell Timmerman, Jr.	Governor of South Carolina; 1959–1963	Succeeded by Donald S. Russell
U.S. Senate
Preceded by Donald S. Russell	United States Senator (Class 3) from South Carolina; 1966–2005; Served alongside: Strom Thurmond, Lindsey Graham	Succeeded by Jim DeMint
Preceded by Edmund Muskie	Chair of the Senate Budget Committee; 1980–1981	Succeeded by Pete Domenici
Preceded by Henry Bellmon	Ranking Member of the Senate Budget Committee; 1981–1983	Succeeded by Lawton Chiles
Preceded by Howard Cannon	Ranking Member of the Senate Commerce Committee; 1983–1987	Succeeded by John Danforth
Preceded by John Danforth	Chair of the Senate Commerce Committee; 1987–1995	Succeeded by Larry Pressler
Preceded by John Danforth	Ranking Member of the Senate Commerce Committee; 1995–2001, 2001	Succeeded by John McCain
Preceded by John McCain	Chair of the Senate Commerce Committee; 2001, 2001–2003	Succeeded by John McCain
Preceded by John McCain	Ranking Member of the Senate Commerce Committee; 2003–2005	Succeeded by Daniel Inouye
Honorary titles
Preceded by John Glenn	Oldest living United States senator (Sitting or former); 2016–2019	Succeeded by Jocelyn Burdick
