= 1966 South Carolina gubernatorial election =

- November 8, 1966
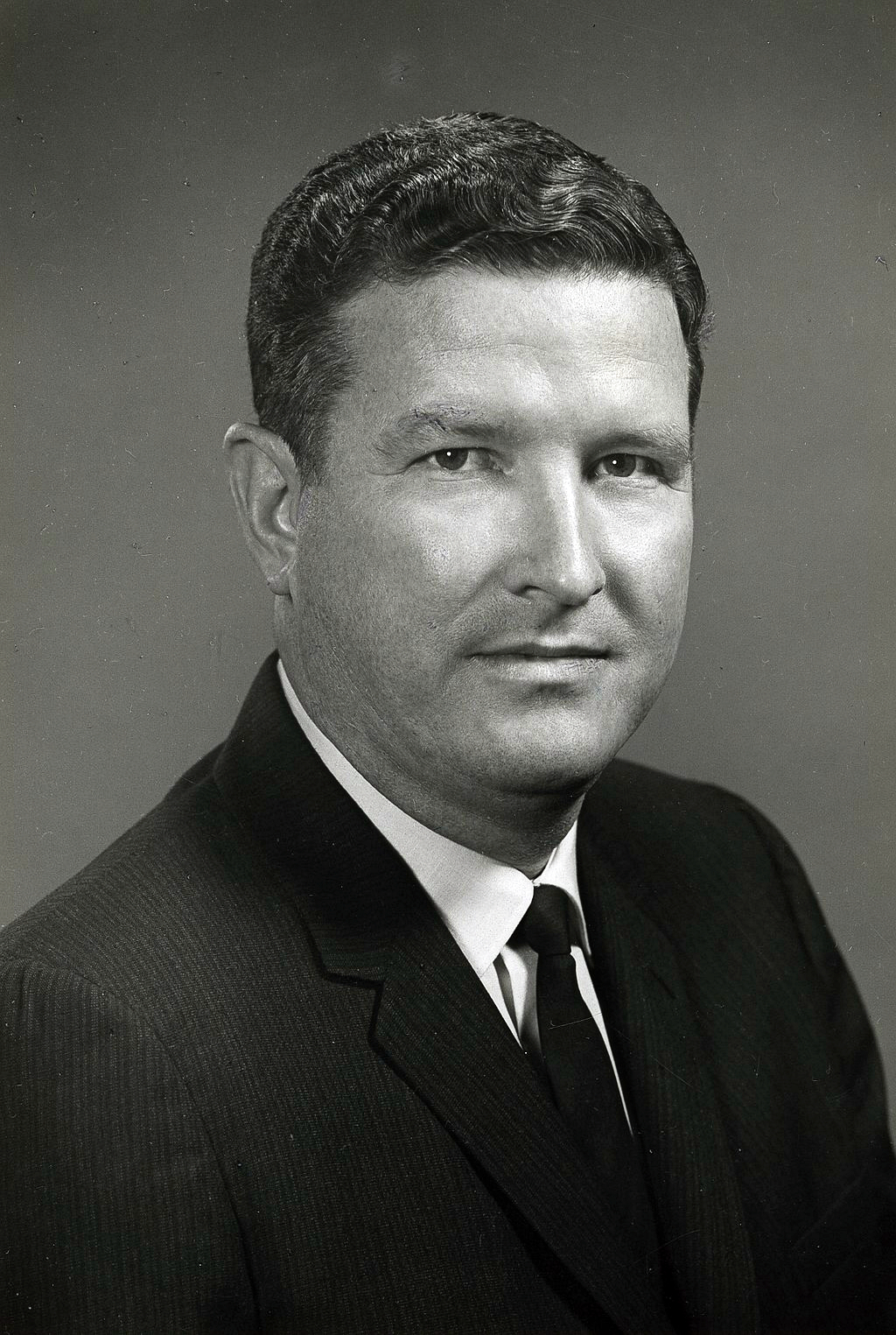

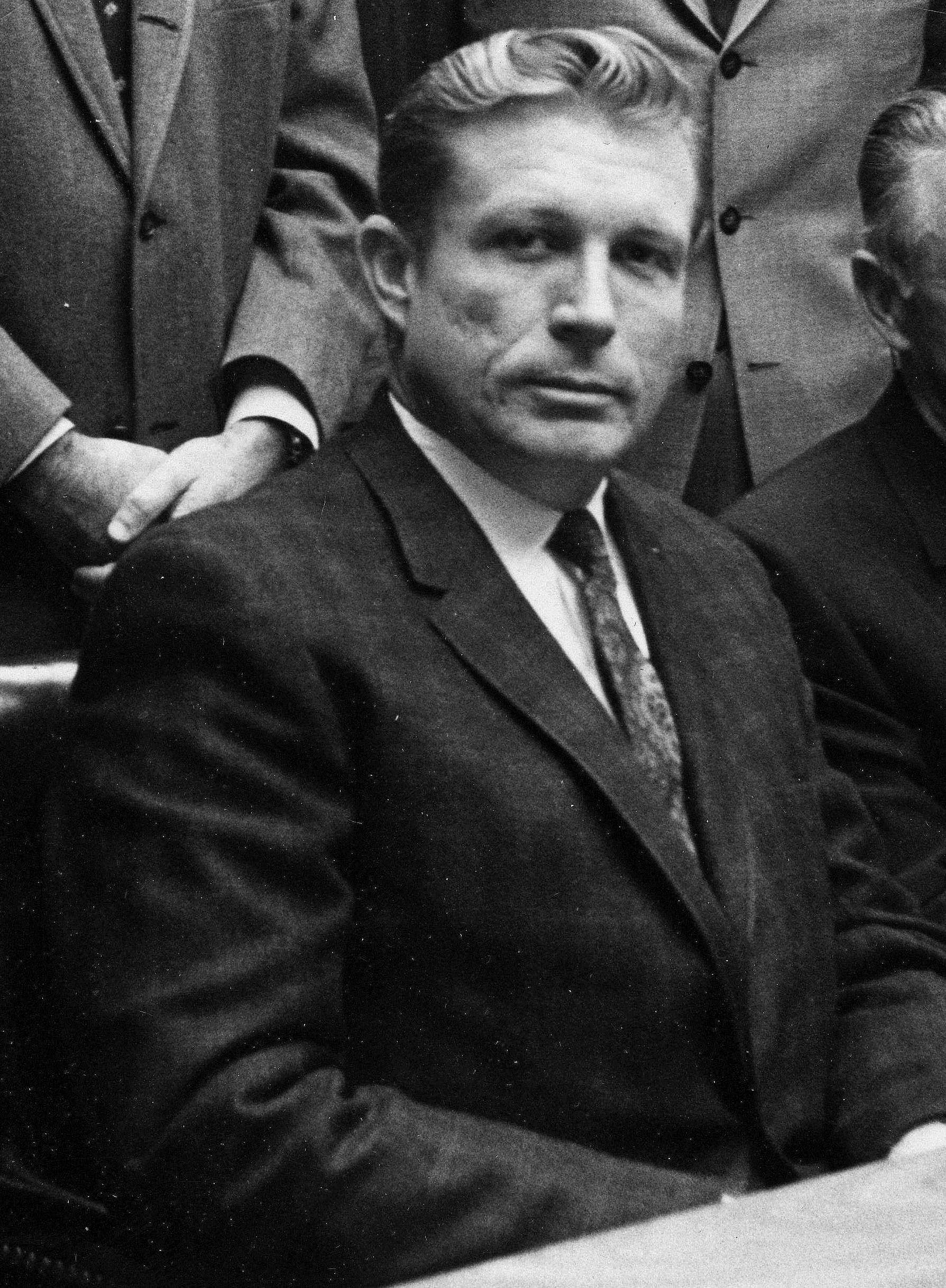
Nominee	Robert Evander McNair	Joseph O. Rogers Jr.
Party	Democratic	Republican
Popular vote	255,854	184,088
Percentage	58.16%	41.84%
- County results McNair: 50–60% 60–70% 70–80% Rogers: 50–60%
Governor before election
Robert Evander McNair
Democratic
Elected Governor
Robert Evander McNair
Democratic

The 1966 South Carolina gubernatorial election was held on November 8, 1966, to select the governor of the state of South Carolina, US. It marked the first time since the gubernatorial election of 1938 that the Democratic candidate faced opposition from a Republican candidate. Governor Robert Evander McNair prevailed as the winner of the election and continued as the 108th governor of South Carolina, but Joseph O. Rogers Jr. had a respectable showing for the first Republican candidate in 90 years.

== Primaries ==
Both Governor McNair and Joseph O. Rogers Jr. faced no opposition in their party's primaries which allowed both candidates to concentrate solely on the general election.

== General election ==
=== Candidates ===
- Robert Evander McNair, incumbent Governor (Democratic)
- Joseph O. Rogers Jr., State Representative from Clarendon County (Republican)

The general election was held on November 8, 1966, and Robert Evander McNair was elected to continue his term as governor of South Carolina. Turnout was the highest for any gubernatorial election since because it was the first time in 90 years that there was a competitive gubernatorial election.

South Carolina Gubernatorial Election, 1966
Party	Candidate	Votes	%	±%
Democratic	Robert Evander McNair (incumbent)	255,854	58.16	−41.8
Republican	Joseph O. Rogers Jr.	184,088	41.84	+41.8
Majority		71,766	16.32	−83.6
Turnout		439,942	49.54	+11.4
Democratic hold				

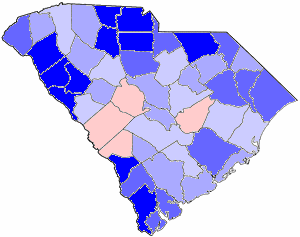
1966 South Carolina gubernatorial election map, by percentile by county. 65+% won by McNair 60%-64% won by McNair 55%-59% won by McNair 50%-54% won by McNair 50%-54% won by Rogers

== See also ==
- Governor of South Carolina
- List of governors of South Carolina
- South Carolina gubernatorial elections

Preceded by 1962	South Carolina gubernatorial elections	Succeeded by 1970
