= List of governors of South Carolina =

Governor of South Carolina
- Seal of the Governor

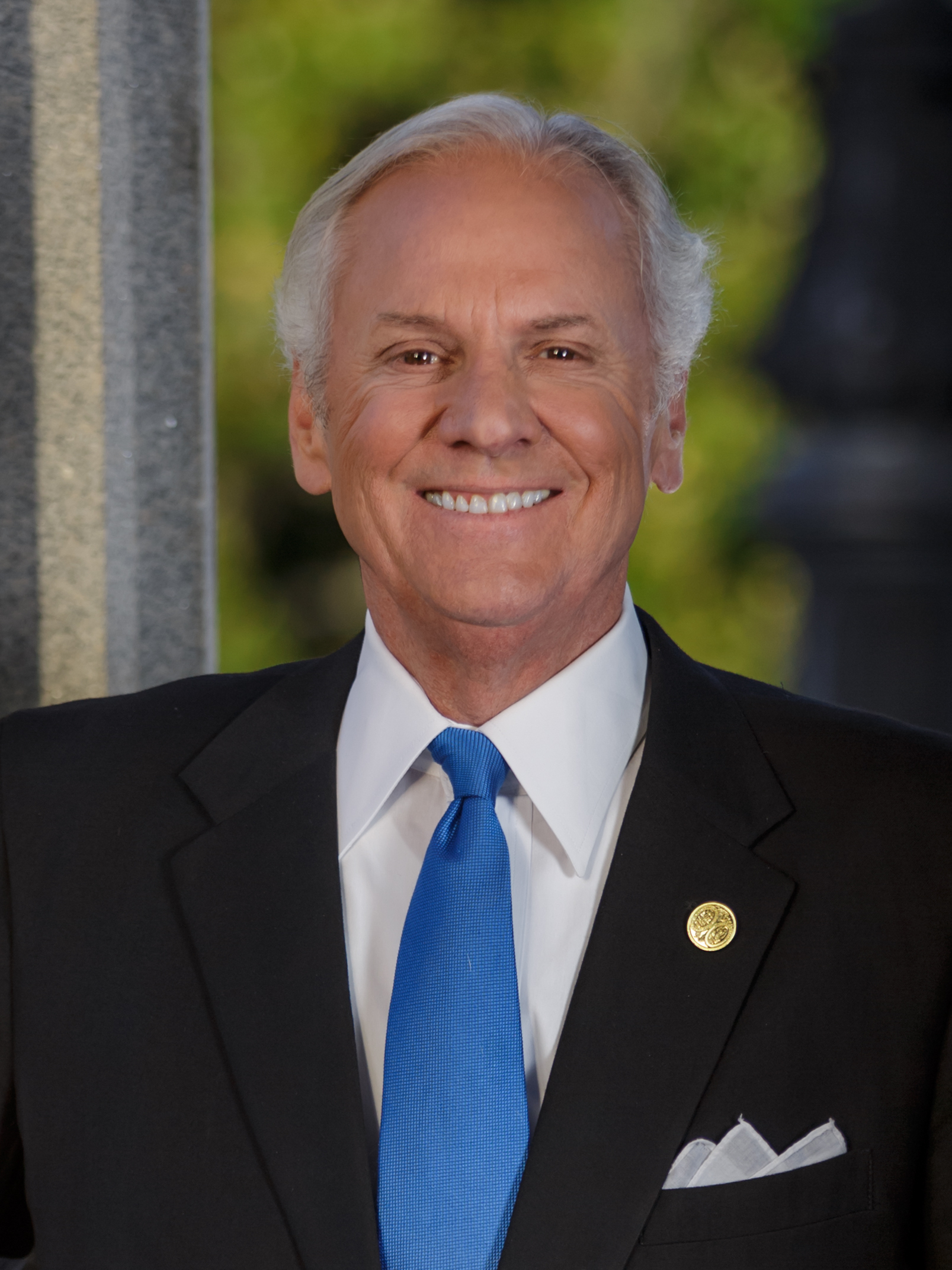
- Incumbent; Henry McMaster since January 24, 2017
- Style: His Excellency
- Term length: Four years, renewable once consecutively
- Website: governor.sc.gov

The governor of South Carolina is the head of government of South Carolina and serves as commander-in-chief of the U.S. state's military forces. The current governor is Henry McMaster, who is also the longest serving governor in South Carolina's history.

== Governors ==
South Carolina was one of the original Thirteen Colonies and was admitted as a state on May 23, 1788. Before it declared its independence, South Carolina was a colony of the Kingdom of Great Britain. It seceded from the Union on December 20, 1860, and was a founding member of the Confederate States of America on February 4, 1861. Following the end of the American Civil War, South Carolina during Reconstruction was part of the Second Military District, which exerted some control over governor appointments and elections. South Carolina was readmitted to the Union on July 9, 1868.

Under the first constitution of South Carolina, a president of the state was elected for a term of two years, who then could not run again until four years had passed. The 1865 constitution briefly increased terms to four years, but that was changed in the 1868 constitution back to two years, with no term limit. An amendment in 1926 increased term lengths to four years, but limited governors to not being able to succeed themselves; an amendment in 1981 allowed governors to succeed themselves once. The 1776 constitution created the office of vice-president, renamed to lieutenant governor in 1778, to succeed to the governorship should it become vacant.

Governors of the State of South Carolina
| No. | Governor (Note: Office was known as President until 1779.) | Term in office | Party | Election | Lt. Governor (Note: Office was known as Vice President until 1779.) (Note: Lieutenant governors represented the same party as their governor unless noted.) |
|---|---|---|---|---|---|
| 31 | John Rutledge (1739–1800) | March 26, 1776 – March 6, 1778 (711 days; resigned) (Note: Rutledge vetoed the new constitution, and after his veto was overturned, he resigned.) | No parties | 1776 | Henry Laurens |
| 32 | Rawlins Lowndes (1721–1800) | March 6, 1778 – January 9, 1779 (310 days; retired) | No parties | 1778 (Note: Arthur Middleton was elected to succeed Rutledge, but he declined the office, as he shared Rutledge's objections to the new constitution. Lowndes was then elected.) | James Parsons |
| 31 | John Rutledge (1739–1800) | January 9, 1779 – January 31, 1782 (1119 days; term-limited) (Note: There was no 1780 election, due to issues arising from the American Revolutionary War, so Rutledge continued to serve after his term would normally have ended, and Mathews' term was accordingly shortened.) (Note: Under the 1778 constitution, governors were ineligible for the office for four years after the end of their term.) | No parties | 1779 | Thomas Bee |
| 31 | John Rutledge (1739–1800) | January 9, 1779 – January 31, 1782 (1119 days; term-limited) | No parties | 1779 | Christopher Gadsden |
| 33 | John Mathews (1744–1802) | January 31, 1782 – February 5, 1783 (371 days; retired) | No parties | 1782 (Note: Christopher Gadsden was elected in 1782, but declined, so the legislature then chose Mathews.) | Richard Hutson |
| 34 | Benjamin Guerard (1740–1788) | February 5, 1783 – February 10, 1785 (737 days; term-limited) | No parties | 1783 | Richard Beresford |
| 34 | Benjamin Guerard (1740–1788) | February 5, 1783 – February 10, 1785 (737 days; term-limited) | No parties | 1783 | Vacant |
| 34 | Benjamin Guerard (1740–1788) | February 5, 1783 – February 10, 1785 (737 days; term-limited) | No parties | 1783 | William Moultrie |
| 35 | William Moultrie (1730–1805) | February 10, 1785 – February 21, 1787 (742 days; term-limited) | No parties | 1785 | Charles Drayton |
| 36 | Thomas Pinckney (1750–1828) | February 21, 1787 – January 26, 1789 (706 days; term-limited) | No parties | 1787 | Thomas Gadsden |
| 37 | Charles Pinckney (1757–1824) | January 26, 1789 – December 5, 1792 (1410 days; term-limited) (Note: Under the 1790 constitution, governors were ineligible for the office for four years after the end of their term.) | No parties | 1789 | Alexander Gillon |
| 37 | Charles Pinckney (1757–1824) | January 26, 1789 – December 5, 1792 (1410 days; term-limited) | No parties | 1791 | Alexander Gillon |
| 35 | William Moultrie (1730–1805) | December 5, 1792 – December 17, 1794 (743 days; term-limited) | Federalist | 1792 | James Ladson |
| 38 | Arnoldus Vanderhorst (1748–1815) | December 17, 1794 – December 8, 1796 (723 days; term-limited) | Federalist | 1794 | Lewis Morris |
| 37 | Charles Pinckney (1757–1824) | December 8, 1796 – December 19, 1798 (742 days; term-limited) | Democratic- Republican | 1796 | Robert Anderson |
| 39 | Edward Rutledge (1749–1800) | December 19, 1798 – January 23, 1800 (401 days; died in office) | Federalist | 1798 | John Drayton (Note: Represented the Democratic-Republican Party) |
| 40 | John Drayton (1766–1822) | January 23, 1800 – December 8, 1802 (1050 days; term-limited) | Democratic- Republican | Succeeded from lieutenant governor | Vacant |
| 40 | John Drayton (1766–1822) | January 23, 1800 – December 8, 1802 (1050 days; term-limited) | Democratic- Republican | 1800 | Richard Winn |
| 41 | James Burchill Richardson (1770–1836) | December 8, 1802 – December 7, 1804 (731 days; term-limited) (Note: Richardson, being term-limited, had already been elected to the South Carolina House of Representatives when his term ended.) | Democratic- Republican | 1802 | Ezekiel Pickens |
| 42 | Paul Hamilton (1762–1816) | December 7, 1804 – December 9, 1806 (733 days; resigned) (Note: Hamilton resigned near the end of his natural term, due to complaints about him running for a seat in the South Carolina legislature while still sitting as governor. Hamilton's resignation was submitted on December 1, but it does not appear to have taken effect until his successor was elected.) | Democratic- Republican | 1804 | Thomas Sumter Jr. |
| 37 | Charles Pinckney (1757–1824) | December 9, 1806 – December 10, 1808 (733 days; term-limited) | Democratic- Republican | 1806 | John Hopkins |
| 40 | John Drayton (1766–1822) | December 10, 1808 – December 10, 1810 (731 days; term-limited) | Democratic- Republican | 1808 | Frederick Nance |
| 43 | Henry Middleton (1770–1846) | December 10, 1810 – December 10, 1812 (732 days; term-limited) | Democratic- Republican | 1810 | Samuel Farrow |
| 44 | Joseph Alston (1779–1816) | December 10, 1812 – December 10, 1814 (731 days; term-limited) | Democratic- Republican | 1812 | Eldred Simkins |
| 45 | David Rogerson Williams (1776–1830) | December 10, 1814 – December 5, 1816 (727 days; term-limited) | Democratic- Republican | 1814 | Robert Creswell |
| 46 | Andrew Pickens (1779–1838) | December 5, 1816 – December 8, 1818 (734 days; term-limited) | Democratic- Republican | 1816 | John A. Cuthbert |
| 47 | John Geddes (1777–1828) | December 8, 1818 – December 7, 1820 (731 days; term-limited) | Democratic- Republican | 1818 | William Youngblood |
| 48 | Thomas Bennett Jr. (1781–1865) | December 7, 1820 – December 9, 1822 (733 days; term-limited) | Democratic- Republican | 1820 | William Pinckney |
| 49 | John Lyde Wilson (1784–1849) | December 9, 1822 – December 3, 1824 (726 days; term-limited) | Democratic- Republican | 1822 | Henry Bradley |
| 50 | Richard Irvine Manning I (1789–1836) | December 3, 1824 – December 11, 1826 (739 days; term-limited) | Democratic- Republican | 1824 | William A. Bull |
| 51 | John Taylor (1770–1832) | December 11, 1826 – December 10, 1828 (731 days; term-limited) | Democratic- Republican | 1826 | James Witherspoon |
| 52 | Stephen Decatur Miller (1787–1838) | December 10, 1828 – December 9, 1830 (730 days; term-limited) | Nullifier | 1828 | Thomas Williams |
| 53 | James Hamilton Jr. (1786–1857) | December 9, 1830 – December 11, 1832 (734 days; term-limited) | Nullifier | 1830 | Patrick Noble |
| 54 | Robert Y. Hayne (1791–1839) | December 11, 1832 – December 11, 1834 (731 days; term-limited) | Nullifier | 1832 | Charles Cotesworth Pinckney II |
| 55 | George McDuffie (1790–1851) | December 11, 1834 – December 10, 1836 (731 days; term-limited) | Democratic | 1834 | Whitemarsh Benjamin Seabrook |
| 56 | Pierce Mason Butler (1798–1847) | December 10, 1836 – December 10, 1838 (731 days; term-limited) | Democratic | 1836 | William DuBose |
| 57 | Patrick Noble (1787–1840) | December 10, 1838 – April 7, 1840 (485 days; died in office) | Democratic | 1838 | Barnabas Kelet Henagan |
| 58 | Barnabas Kelet Henagan (1798–1855) | April 7, 1840 – December 10, 1840 (248 days; retired) | Democratic | Succeeded from lieutenant governor | Vacant |
| 59 | John Peter Richardson II (1801–1864) | December 10, 1840 – December 10, 1842 (731 days; term-limited) | Democratic | 1840 | William K. Clowney |
| 60 | James H. Hammond (1807–1864) | December 10, 1842 – December 10, 1844 (732 days; term-limited) | Democratic | 1842 | Isaac Donnom Witherspoon |
| 61 | William Aiken Jr. (1806–1887) | December 10, 1844 – December 10, 1846 (731 days; term-limited) | Democratic | 1844 | J. F. Ervin |
| 62 | David Johnson (1782–1855) | December 10, 1846 – December 14, 1848 (736 days; term-limited) | Democratic | 1846 | William Cain |
| 63 | Whitemarsh Benjamin Seabrook (1793–1855) | December 14, 1848 – December 16, 1850 (733 days; term-limited) | Democratic | 1848 | William Henry Gist |
| 64 | John Hugh Means (1812–1862) | December 16, 1850 – December 13, 1852 (729 days; term-limited) | Democratic | 1850 | Joshua John Ward |
| 65 | John Lawrence Manning (1816–1889) | December 13, 1852 – December 13, 1854 (731 days; term-limited) | Democratic | 1852 | James Irby |
| 66 | James Hopkins Adams (1812–1861) | December 13, 1854 – December 11, 1856 (730 days; term-limited) | Democratic | 1854 | Richard de Treville |
| 67 | Robert Francis Withers Allston (1801–1864) | December 11, 1856 – December 13, 1858 (733 days; term-limited) | Democratic | 1856 | Gabriel Cannon |
| 68 | William Henry Gist (1807–1874) | December 13, 1858 – December 17, 1860 (736 days; term-limited) | Democratic | 1858 | M. E. Carn |
| 69 | Francis Wilkinson Pickens (d. 1869) | December 17, 1860 – December 18, 1862 (732 days; term-limited) (Note: Under the 1861 constitution, governors were ineligible for the office for four years after the end of their term.) | Democratic | 1860 | W. W. Harllee |
| 70 | Milledge Luke Bonham (1813–1890) | December 18, 1862 – December 19, 1864 (733 days; term-limited) | Democratic | 1862 | Plowden Weston (died) |
| 70 | Milledge Luke Bonham (1813–1890) | December 18, 1862 – December 19, 1864 (733 days; term-limited) | Democratic | 1862 | Vacant |
| 71 | Andrew Gordon Magrath (1813–1893) | December 19, 1864 – May 28, 1865 (161 days; arrested and removed) (Note: Magrath was arrested by Union forces soon after the American Civil War ended; he was released seven months later.) | Democratic | 1864 | Robert McCaw |
| — | Vacant | May 28, 1865 – June 30, 1865 (34 days) | Office vacated after civil war | | Vacant |
| 72 | Benjamin Franklin Perry (1805–1886) | June 30, 1865 – November 29, 1865 (153 days; retired) | Provisional governor appointed by President | | Vacant |
| 73 | James Lawrence Orr (1822–1873) | November 29, 1865 – July 9, 1868 (954 days; retired) | Democratic | 1865 | William Dennison Porter |
| 74 | Robert Kingston Scott (1826–1900) | July 9, 1868 – December 3, 1872 (1609 days; retired) | Republican | 1868 | Lemuel Boozer |
| 74 | Robert Kingston Scott (1826–1900) | July 9, 1868 – December 3, 1872 (1609 days; retired) | Republican | 1870 | Alonzo J. Ransier |
| 75 | Franklin J. Moses Jr. (1838–1906) | December 3, 1872 – December 1, 1874 (729 days; retired) | Republican | 1872 | Richard Howell Gleaves |
| 76 | Daniel Henry Chamberlain (1835–1907) | December 1, 1874 – April 11, 1877 (863 days; lost election) | Republican | 1874 | Richard Howell Gleaves |
| 76 | Daniel Henry Chamberlain (1835–1907) | December 1, 1874 – April 11, 1877 (863 days; lost election) | Republican | 1876 (Note: The 1876 election was very close, and two governments emerged, one run by Chamberlain, the other by Hampton. The dispute ended in April 1877 with Hampton and the Democratic Party taking control of the state.) | Richard Howell Gleaves |
| 77 | Wade Hampton III (1818–1902) | December 14, 1876 – February 26, 1879 (805 days; resigned) (Note: Hampton resigned, having been elected to the United States Senate; some modern sources say he resigned after being wounded in a hunting accident, but the letter of resignation makes no mention of this.) | Democratic | 1876 | William Dunlap Simpson |
| 77 | Wade Hampton III (1818–1902) | December 14, 1876 – February 26, 1879 (805 days; resigned) | Democratic | 1878 | William Dunlap Simpson |
| 78 | William Dunlap Simpson (1823–1890) | February 26, 1879 – September 1, 1880 (554 days; resigned) (Note: Simpson resigned, having been elected Chief Justice of the South Carolina Supreme Court.) | Democratic | Succeeded from lieutenant governor | Vacant |
| 79 | Thomas Bothwell Jeter (1827–1883) | September 1, 1880 – November 30, 1880 (91 days; retired) | Democratic | Succeeded from president pro tempore of the Senate | Vacant |
| 80 | Johnson Hagood (1829–1898) | November 30, 1880 – December 5, 1882 (736 days; retired) | Democratic | 1880 | John Doby Kennedy |
| 81 | Hugh Smith Thompson (1836–1904) | December 5, 1882 – July 10, 1886 (1314 days; resigned) (Note: Thompson resigned, having been confirmed as United States Assistant Secretary of the Treasury.) | Democratic | 1882 | John Calhoun Sheppard |
| 81 | Hugh Smith Thompson (1836–1904) | December 5, 1882 – July 10, 1886 (1314 days; resigned) | Democratic | 1884 | John Calhoun Sheppard |
| 82 | John Calhoun Sheppard (1850–1931) | July 10, 1886 – November 30, 1886 (144 days; lost nomination) | Democratic | Succeeded from lieutenant governor | Vacant |
| 83 | John Peter Richardson III (1831–1899) | November 30, 1886 – December 4, 1890 (1466 days; retired) | Democratic | 1886 | William L. Mauldin |
| 83 | John Peter Richardson III (1831–1899) | November 30, 1886 – December 4, 1890 (1466 days; retired) | Democratic | 1888 | William L. Mauldin |
| 84 | Benjamin Tillman (1847–1918) | December 4, 1890 – December 4, 1894 (1462 days; retired) (Note: Tillman was instead elected to the United States Senate.) | Democratic | 1890 | Eugene B. Gary |
| 84 | Benjamin Tillman (1847–1918) | December 4, 1890 – December 4, 1894 (1462 days; retired) | Democratic | 1892 | Washington Hodges Timmerman |
| 85 | John Gary Evans (1863–1942) | December 4, 1894 – January 18, 1897 (777 days; retired) (Note: Evans instead ran unsuccessfully for the Democratic nomination to the United States Senate.) | Democratic | 1894 | Washington Hodges Timmerman |
| 86 | William Haselden Ellerbe (1862–1899) | January 18, 1897 – June 2, 1899 (866 days; died in office) | Democratic | 1896 | Miles Benjamin McSweeney |
| 86 | William Haselden Ellerbe (1862–1899) | January 18, 1897 – June 2, 1899 (866 days; died in office) | Democratic | 1898 | Miles Benjamin McSweeney |
| 87 | Miles Benjamin McSweeney (1855–1909) | June 2, 1899 – January 21, 1903 (1329 days; retired) | Democratic | Succeeded from lieutenant governor | Robert B. Scarborough |
| 87 | Miles Benjamin McSweeney (1855–1909) | June 2, 1899 – January 21, 1903 (1329 days; retired) | Democratic | 1900 | Robert B. Scarborough |
| 88 | Duncan Clinch Heyward (1864–1943) | January 21, 1903 – January 15, 1907 (1456 days; retired) | Democratic | 1902 | James H. Tillman |
| 88 | Duncan Clinch Heyward (1864–1943) | January 21, 1903 – January 15, 1907 (1456 days; retired) | Democratic | 1904 | John Sloan |
| 89 | Martin Frederick Ansel (1850–1945) | January 15, 1907 – January 17, 1911 (1464 days; retired) | Democratic | 1906 | Thomas Gordon McLeod |
| 89 | Martin Frederick Ansel (1850–1945) | January 15, 1907 – January 17, 1911 (1464 days; retired) | Democratic | 1908 | Thomas Gordon McLeod |
| 90 | Cole L. Blease (1868–1942) | January 17, 1911 – January 14, 1915 (1459 days; resigned) (Note: Blease resigned, citing no reason.) | Democratic | 1910 | Charles Aurelius Smith |
| 90 | Cole L. Blease (1868–1942) | January 17, 1911 – January 14, 1915 (1459 days; resigned) | Democratic | 1912 | Charles Aurelius Smith |
| 91 | Charles Aurelius Smith (1861–1916) | January 14, 1915 – January 19, 1915 (6 days; retired) (Note: Smith had already lost the Democratic nomination for governor when he succeeded Blease.) | Democratic | Succeeded from lieutenant governor | Vacant |
| 92 | Richard Irvine Manning III (1859–1931) | January 19, 1915 – January 21, 1919 (1464 days; retired) | Democratic | 1914 | Andrew Bethea |
| 92 | Richard Irvine Manning III (1859–1931) | January 19, 1915 – January 21, 1919 (1464 days; retired) | Democratic | 1916 | Andrew Bethea |
| 93 | Robert Archer Cooper (1874–1953) | January 21, 1919 – May 20, 1922 (1216 days; resigned) (Note: Cooper resigned, having been appointed to the Federal Farm Loan Board.) | Democratic | 1918 | J. T. Lyles |
| 93 | Robert Archer Cooper (1874–1953) | January 21, 1919 – May 20, 1922 (1216 days; resigned) | Democratic | 1920 | Wilson Godfrey Harvey |
| 94 | Wilson Godfrey Harvey (1866–1932) | May 20, 1922 – January 16, 1923 (242 days; retired) | Democratic | Succeeded from lieutenant governor | Vacant |
| 95 | Thomas Gordon McLeod (1868–1932) | January 16, 1923 – January 18, 1927 (1464 days; term-limited) (Note: Under the 1926 constitution, governors were ineligible to succeed themselves.) | Democratic | 1922 | E. B. Jackson |
| 95 | Thomas Gordon McLeod (1868–1932) | January 16, 1923 – January 18, 1927 (1464 days; term-limited) | Democratic | 1924 | E. B. Jackson |
| 96 | John Gardiner Richards Jr. (1864–1941) | January 18, 1927 – January 20, 1931 (1464 days; term-limited) | Democratic | 1926 | Thomas Bothwell Butler (died) |
| 96 | John Gardiner Richards Jr. (1864–1941) | January 18, 1927 – January 20, 1931 (1464 days; term-limited) | Democratic | 1926 | Vacant |
| 97 | Ibra Charles Blackwood (1878–1936) | January 20, 1931 – January 15, 1935 (1457 days; term-limited) | Democratic | 1930 | James O. Sheppard |
| 98 | Olin D. Johnston (1896–1965) | January 15, 1935 – January 17, 1939 (1464 days; term-limited) | Democratic | 1934 | Joseph Emile Harley |
| 99 | Burnet R. Maybank (1899–1954) | January 17, 1939 – November 4, 1941 (1023 days; resigned) (Note: Maybank resigned, having been elected to the United States Senate.) | Democratic | 1938 | Joseph Emile Harley |
| 100 | Joseph Emile Harley (1880–1942) | November 4, 1941 – February 27, 1942 (116 days; died in office) | Democratic | Succeeded from lieutenant governor | Vacant |
| — | Vacant | February 27, 1942 – March 2, 1942 (4 days) | — | Office vacant after death (Note: Harley died on February 27; even though the constitution says that the president pro tempore of the Senate would succeed to the office of governor should both it and lieutenant governor become vacant, Jefferies delayed accepting for several days, unsure if he wanted to leave his Senate duties.) | Vacant |
| 101 | Richard Manning Jefferies (1889–1964) | March 2, 1942 – January 19, 1943 (324 days; retired) (Note: Jefferies was instead reelected to the South Carolina Senate.) | Democratic | Succeeded from president pro tempore of the Senate | Vacant |
| 98 | Olin D. Johnston (1896–1965) | January 19, 1943 – January 2, 1945 (715 days; resigned) (Note: Johnston resigned, having been elected to the United States Senate.) | Democratic | 1942 | Ransome Judson Williams |
| 102 | Ransome Judson Williams (1892–1970) | January 2, 1945 – January 21, 1947 (750 days; lost nomination) | Democratic | Succeeded from lieutenant governor | Vacant |
| 103 | Strom Thurmond (1902–2003) | January 21, 1947 – January 16, 1951 (1457 days; term-limited) (Note: Thurmond, being term-limited, had already lost the Democratic nomination for United States Senate when his term ended.) | Democratic | 1946 | George Bell Timmerman Jr. |
| 104 | James F. Byrnes (1882–1972) | January 16, 1951 – January 18, 1955 (1464 days; term-limited) | Democratic | 1950 | George Bell Timmerman Jr. |
| 105 | George Bell Timmerman Jr. (1912–1994) | January 18, 1955 – January 20, 1959 (1464 days; term-limited) | Democratic | 1954 | Fritz Hollings |
| 106 | Fritz Hollings (1922–2019) | January 20, 1959 – January 15, 1963 (1457 days; term-limited) | Democratic | 1958 | Burnet R. Maybank Jr. |
| 107 | Donald S. Russell (1906–1998) | January 15, 1963 – April 22, 1965 (829 days; resigned) (Note: Russell resigned so that his successor would appoint him to the United States Senate.) | Democratic | 1962 | Robert Evander McNair |
| 108 | Robert Evander McNair (1923–2007) | April 22, 1965 – January 19, 1971 (2099 days; term-limited) | Democratic | Succeeded from lieutenant governor | Vacant |
| 108 | Robert Evander McNair (1923–2007) | April 22, 1965 – January 19, 1971 (2099 days; term-limited) | Democratic | 1966 | John C. West |
| 109 | John C. West (1922–2004) | January 19, 1971 – January 15, 1975 (1458 days; term-limited) | Democratic | 1970 | Earle Morris Jr. |
| 110 | James B. Edwards (1927–2014) | January 15, 1975 – January 10, 1979 (1457 days; term-limited) | Republican | 1974 | W. Brantley Harvey Jr. (Note: Represented the Democratic Party) |
| 111 | Richard Riley (b. 1933) | January 10, 1979 – January 14, 1987 (2927 days; term-limited) (Note: Under a 1981 amendment to the constitution, governors are ineligible to be elected for more than two successive terms.) | Democratic | 1978 | Nancy Stevenson |
| 111 | Richard Riley (b. 1933) | January 10, 1979 – January 14, 1987 (2927 days; term-limited) | Democratic | 1982 | Michael R. Daniel |
| 112 | Carroll A. Campbell Jr. (1940–2005) | January 14, 1987 – January 11, 1995 (2920 days; term-limited) | Republican | 1986 | Nick Theodore |
| 112 | Carroll A. Campbell Jr. (1940–2005) | January 14, 1987 – January 11, 1995 (2920 days; term-limited) | Republican | 1990 | Nick Theodore |
| 113 | David Beasley (b. 1957) | January 11, 1995 – January 13, 1999 (1464 days; lost election) | Republican | 1994 | Bob Peeler (Note: Represented the Republican Party) |
| 114 | Jim Hodges (b. 1956) | January 13, 1999 – January 15, 2003 (1464 days; lost election) | Democratic | 1998 | Bob Peeler |
| 115 | Mark Sanford (b. 1960) | January 15, 2003 – January 12, 2011 (2920 days; term-limited) | Republican | 2002 | André Bauer |
| 115 | Mark Sanford (b. 1960) | January 15, 2003 – January 12, 2011 (2920 days; term-limited) | Republican | 2006 | André Bauer |
| 116 | Nikki Haley (b. 1972) | January 12, 2011 – January 24, 2017 (2205 days; resigned) (Note: Haley resigned, having been confirmed as United States Ambassador to the United Nations.) | Republican | 2010 | Ken Ard |
| 116 | Nikki Haley (b. 1972) | January 12, 2011 – January 24, 2017 (2205 days; resigned) | Republican | 2010 | Glenn F. McConnell |
| 116 | Nikki Haley (b. 1972) | January 12, 2011 – January 24, 2017 (2205 days; resigned) | Republican | 2010 | Yancey McGill |
| 116 | Nikki Haley (b. 1972) | January 12, 2011 – January 24, 2017 (2205 days; resigned) | Republican | 2014 | Henry McMaster |
| 117 | Henry McMaster (b. 1947) | January 24, 2017 – Incumbent (Note: McMaster's second full term began on January 11, 2023, and will expire on January 13, 2027; he is term-limited.) (in office 3590 days) | Republican | Succeeded from lieutenant governor | Kevin L. Bryant |
| 117 | Henry McMaster (b. 1947) | January 24, 2017 – Incumbent (in office 3590 days) | Republican | 2018 | Pamela Evette |
| 117 | Henry McMaster (b. 1947) | January 24, 2017 – Incumbent (in office 3590 days) | Republican | 2022 | Pamela Evette |
| 118 | Alan Wilson (b. 1973) | Governor-elect takes office January 13, 2027 | Republican | 2026 | Mike Reichenbach |

== See also ==
- Gubernatorial lines of succession in the United States § South Carolina
- List of first spouses of South Carolina
- List of lieutenant governors of South Carolina
- List of colonial governors of South Carolina
- List of South Carolina state legislatures

== Sources ==
- "Former South Carolina Governors". National Governors Association.
- "South Carolina Constitution". State Democracy Research Initiative. University of Wisconsin Law School.
- Dubin, Michael J. (2003). United States Gubernatorial Elections, 1776–1860: The Official Results by State and County. McFarland. ISBN 0-7864-1439-1 – via Internet Archive.
- Glashan, Roy R. (1979). American Governors and Gubernatorial Elections, 1775-1978. Meckler Books. ISBN 0-7201-1511-6 – via Internet Archive.
- Kallenbach, Joseph E.; Kallenbach, Jessamine S. (1977). American State Governors, 1776-1976. Oceana Publications. ISBN 978-0-379-00665-0 – via Internet Archive.
- Mullaney, Marie Marmo (1994). Biographical Directory of the Governors of the United States, 1988–1994. Greenwood Publishing Group. ISBN 0-313-28312-5 – via Internet Archive.
- Sobel, Robert; Raimo, John (1978). Biographical Directory of the Governors of the United States, 1789-1978. Vol. 4. Meckler Books. ISBN 0-930466-01-2 – via Internet Archive.
- Thorpe, Francis Newton, ed. (1909). The Federal and State Constitutions, Colonial Charters, and Other Organic Laws of the States, Territories, and Colonies Now or Heretofore Forming the United States of America. Vol. 6. United States Government Publishing Office – via Internet Archive.
