= 1846 South Carolina gubernatorial election =

- December 8, 1846
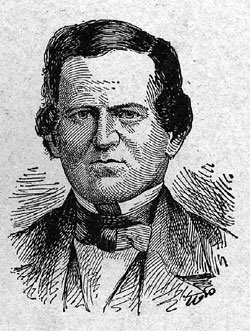
Nominee	David Johnson
Party	Democratic
Governor before election
William Aiken Jr.
Democratic
Elected Governor
David Johnson
Democratic

The 1846 South Carolina gubernatorial election was held on December 8, 1846, in order to elect the Governor of South Carolina. Democratic candidate and incumbent Chancellor of the South Carolina Court of Appeals David Johnson was elected by the South Carolina General Assembly as he ran unopposed. The exact number of votes cast in this election is unknown.

== General election ==
On election day, December 8, 1846, Democratic candidate David Johnson was elected by the South Carolina General Assembly, thereby retaining Democratic control over the office of Governor. Johnson was sworn in as the 62nd Governor of South Carolina on January 3, 1847.

=== Results ===
South Carolina gubernatorial election, 1846
Party	Candidate	Votes	%
Democratic	David Johnson	Unknown	100.00%
Total votes		Unknown	100.00%
Democratic hold			
