= 1822 South Carolina gubernatorial election =

- December 7, 1822
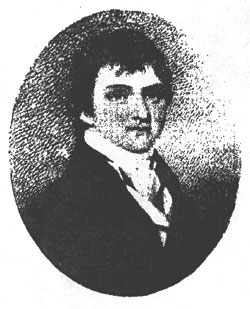

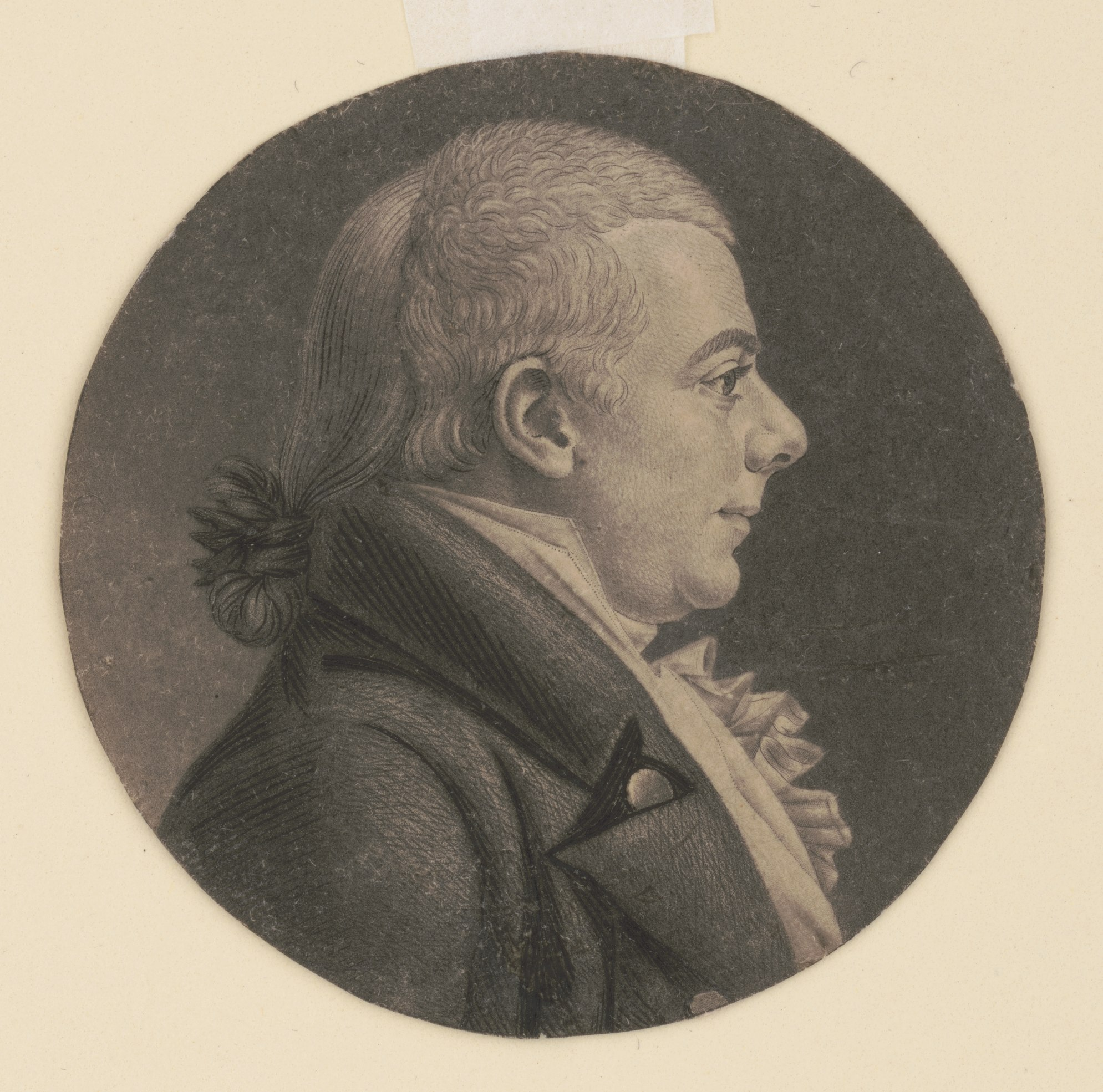
Nominee	John Lyde Wilson	Benjamin Huger
Party	Democratic-Republican	Federalist
Popular vote	83	72
Percentage	52.53%	45.57%
Governor before election
Thomas Bennett Jr.
Democratic-Republican
Elected Governor
John Lyde Wilson
Democratic-Republican

The 1822 South Carolina gubernatorial election was held on December 7, 1822, in order to elect the Governor of South Carolina. Democratic-Republican candidate and incumbent President of the South Carolina Senate John Lyde Wilson was elected by the South Carolina General Assembly against Federalist candidate and former President of the South Carolina Senate Benjamin Huger.

== General election ==
On election day, December 7, 1822, Democratic-Republican candidate John Lyde Wilson was elected by the South Carolina General Assembly by a margin of 11 votes against his opponent Federalist candidate Benjamin Huger, thereby retaining Democratic-Republican control over the office of Governor. Wilson was sworn in as the 49th Governor of South Carolina on January 3, 1823.

=== Results ===
South Carolina gubernatorial election, 1822
Party	Candidate	Votes	%
Democratic-Republican	John Lyde Wilson	83	52.53%
Federalist	Benjamin Huger	72	45.57%
	Scattering	3	1.90%
Total votes		158	100.00%
Democratic-Republican hold			
