= 1824 South Carolina gubernatorial election =

- December 3, 1824
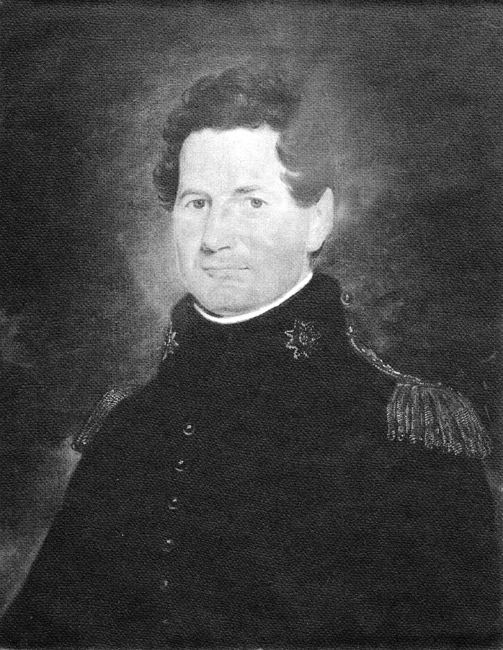

Nominee	Richard Irvine Manning I	Jacob B. I'on
Party	Democratic-Republican
Popular vote	103	60
Percentage	62.81%	36.59%
Governor before election
John Lyde Wilson
Democratic-Republican
Elected Governor
Richard Irvine Manning I
Democratic-Republican

The 1824 South Carolina gubernatorial election was held on December 3, 1824, in order to elect the Governor of South Carolina. Democratic-Republican candidate and incumbent member of the South Carolina House of Representatives Richard Irvine Manning I was elected by the South Carolina General Assembly against candidate Jacob B. I'on.

== General election ==
On election day, December 3, 1824, Democratic-Republican candidate Richard Irvine Manning I was elected by the South Carolina General Assembly by a margin of 43 votes against his opponent candidate Jacob B. I'on, thereby retaining Democratic-Republican control over the office of Governor. Manning was sworn in as the 50th Governor of South Carolina on January 3, 1825.

=== Results ===
South Carolina gubernatorial election, 1824
Party	Candidate	Votes	%
Democratic-Republican	Richard Irvine Manning I	103	62.81%
	Jacob B. I'on	60	36.59%
	Scattering	1	0.60%
Total votes		164	100.00%
Democratic-Republican hold			
