= 1848 South Carolina gubernatorial election =

- December 12, 1848
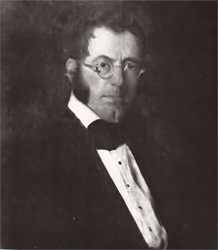
Nominee	Whitemarsh Benjamin Seabrook
Party	Democratic
Governor before election
David Johnson
Democratic
Elected Governor
Whitemarsh Benjamin Seabrook
Democratic

The 1848 South Carolina gubernatorial election was held on December 12, 1848, in order to elect the Governor of South Carolina. Democratic candidate and former Lieutenant Governor of South Carolina Whitemarsh Benjamin Seabrook was elected by the South Carolina General Assembly as he ran unopposed. The exact number of votes cast in this election is unknown.

== General election ==
On election day, December 12, 1848, Democratic candidate Whitemarsh Benjamin Seabrook was elected by the South Carolina General Assembly, thereby retaining Democratic control over the office of Governor. Seabrook was sworn in as the 63rd Governor of South Carolina on January 3, 1849.

=== Results ===
South Carolina gubernatorial election, 1848
Party	Candidate	Votes	%
Democratic	Whitemarsh Benjamin Seabrook	Unknown	100.00%
Total votes		Unknown	100.00%
Democratic hold			
