= 1787 South Carolina gubernatorial election =

- May 10, 1787
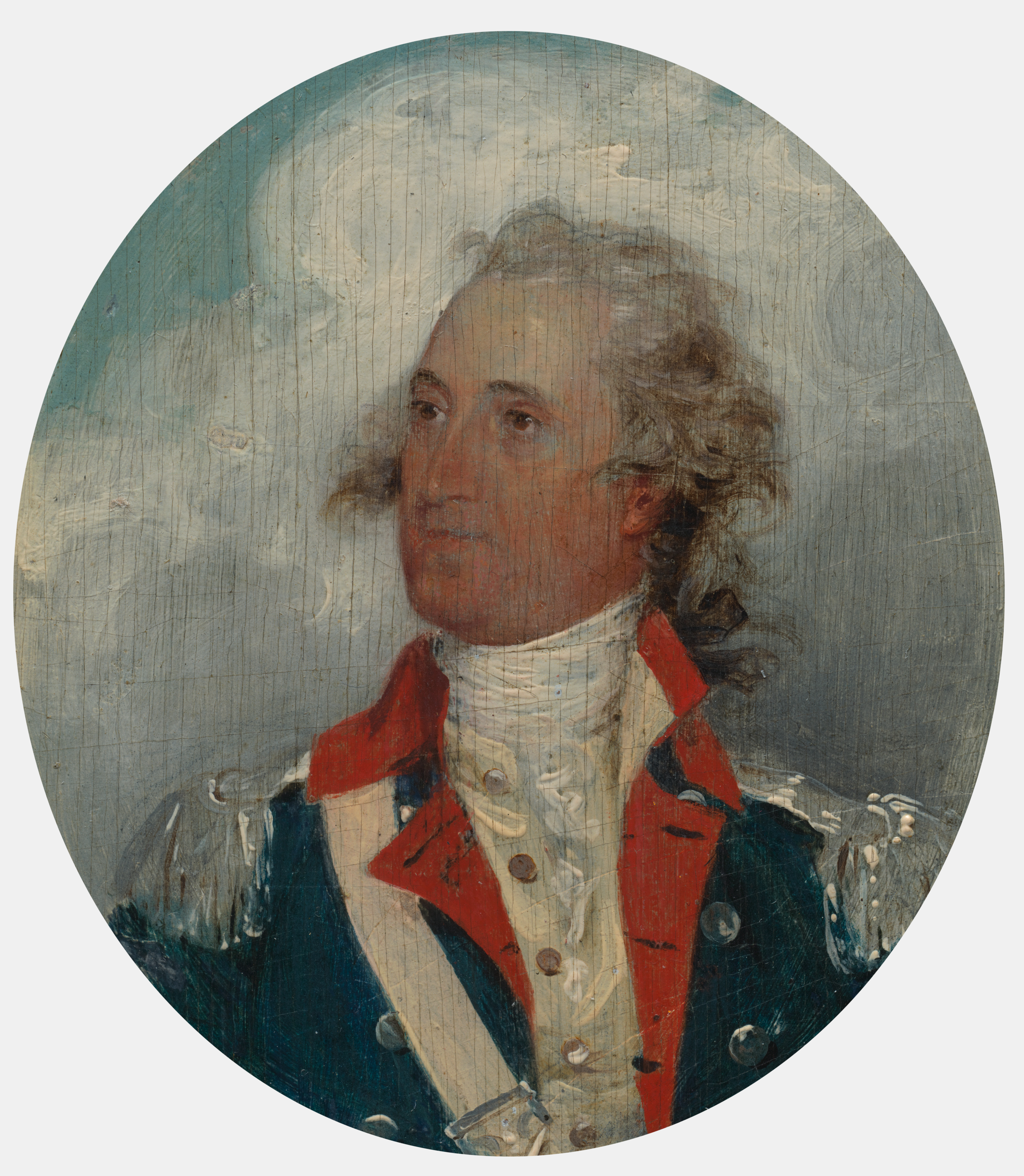
Nominee	Thomas Pinckney
Party	Nonpartisan
Popular vote	Unknown
Percentage	Unknown
Governor before election
William Moultrie
Nonpartisan
Elected Governor
Thomas Pinckney
Nonpartisan

The 1787 South Carolina gubernatorial election was held on May 10, 1787, in order to elect the Governor of South Carolina. Candidate Thomas Pinckney was elected by the South Carolina General Assembly as he ran unopposed. The exact number of votes cast in this election is unknown.

== General election ==
On election day, May 10, 1787, candidate Thomas Pinckney was elected by the South Carolina General Assembly. Pinckney was sworn in as the 36th Governor of South Carolina that same day.

=== Results ===
South Carolina gubernatorial election, 1787
Party	Candidate	Votes	%
Nonpartisan	Thomas Pinckney	Unknown	
Total votes		Unknown	
Nonpartisan hold			
