= 1828 South Carolina gubernatorial election =

- December 10, 1828
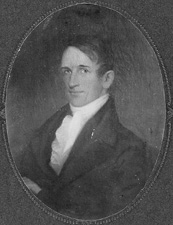
Nominee	Stephen Decatur Miller
Party	Nullifier
Governor before election
John Taylor
Democratic-Republican
Elected Governor
Stephen Decatur Miller
Nullifier

The 1828 South Carolina gubernatorial election was held on December 10, 1828, in order to elect the Governor of South Carolina. Nullifier candidate and incumbent member of the South Carolina Senate Stephen Decatur Miller was elected by the South Carolina General Assembly as he ran unopposed. The exact number of votes cast in this election is unknown.

== General election ==
On election day, December 10, 1828, Nullifier candidate Stephen Decatur Miller was elected by the South Carolina General Assembly, thereby gaining Nullifier control over the office of Governor. Miller was sworn in as the 52nd Governor of South Carolina on January 3, 1829.

=== Results ===
South Carolina gubernatorial election, 1828
Party	Candidate	Votes	%
Nullifier	Stephen Decatur Miller	Unknown	100.00%
Total votes		Unknown	100.00%
Nullifier gain from Democratic-Republican			
