= 1836 South Carolina gubernatorial election =

- December 10, 1836
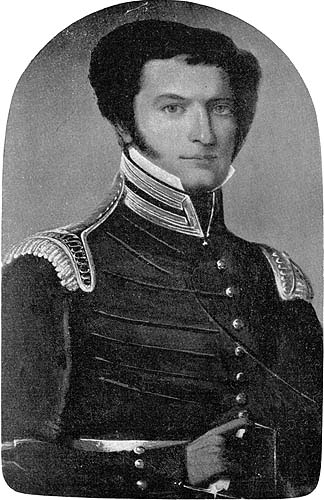
Nominee	Pierce Mason Butler
Party	Democratic
Governor before election
George McDuffie
Democratic
Elected Governor
Pierce Mason Butler
Democratic

The 1836 South Carolina gubernatorial election was held on December 10, 1836, in order to elect the Governor of South Carolina. Democratic candidate Pierce Mason Butler was elected by the South Carolina General Assembly as he ran unopposed. The exact number of votes cast in this election is unknown.

== General election ==
On election day, December 10, 1836, Democratic candidate Pierce Mason Butler was elected by the South Carolina General Assembly, thereby retaining Democratic control over the office of Governor. Butler was sworn in as the 56th Governor of South Carolina on January 17, 1837.

=== Results ===
South Carolina gubernatorial election, 1836
Party	Candidate	Votes	%
Democratic	Pierce Mason Butler	Unknown	100.00%
Total votes		Unknown	100.00%
Democratic hold			
