= 1858 South Carolina gubernatorial election =

- December 10, 1858
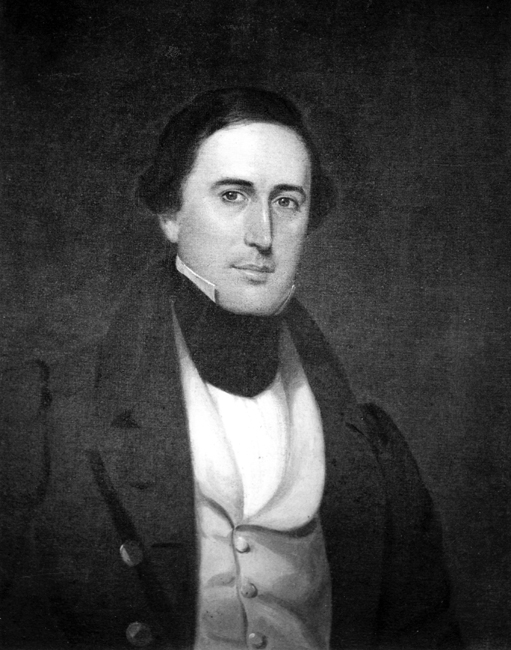
Nominee	William Henry Gist
Party	Democratic
Governor before election
Robert Francis Withers Allston
Democratic
Elected Governor
William Henry Gist
Democratic

The 1858 South Carolina gubernatorial election was held on December 10, 1858, in order to elect the Governor of South Carolina. Democratic candidate and former Lieutenant Governor of South Carolina William Henry Gist was elected by the South Carolina General Assembly as he ran unopposed. The exact number of votes cast in this election is unknown.

== General election ==
On election day, December 10, 1858, Democratic candidate William Henry Gist was elected by the South Carolina General Assembly, thereby retaining Democratic control over the office of Governor. Gist was sworn in as the 68th Governor of South Carolina on January 3, 1859.

=== Results ===
South Carolina gubernatorial election, 1858
Party	Candidate	Votes	%
Democratic	William Henry Gist	Unknown	100.00%
Total votes		Unknown	100.00%
Democratic hold			
