= 1842 South Carolina gubernatorial election =

- December 8, 1842
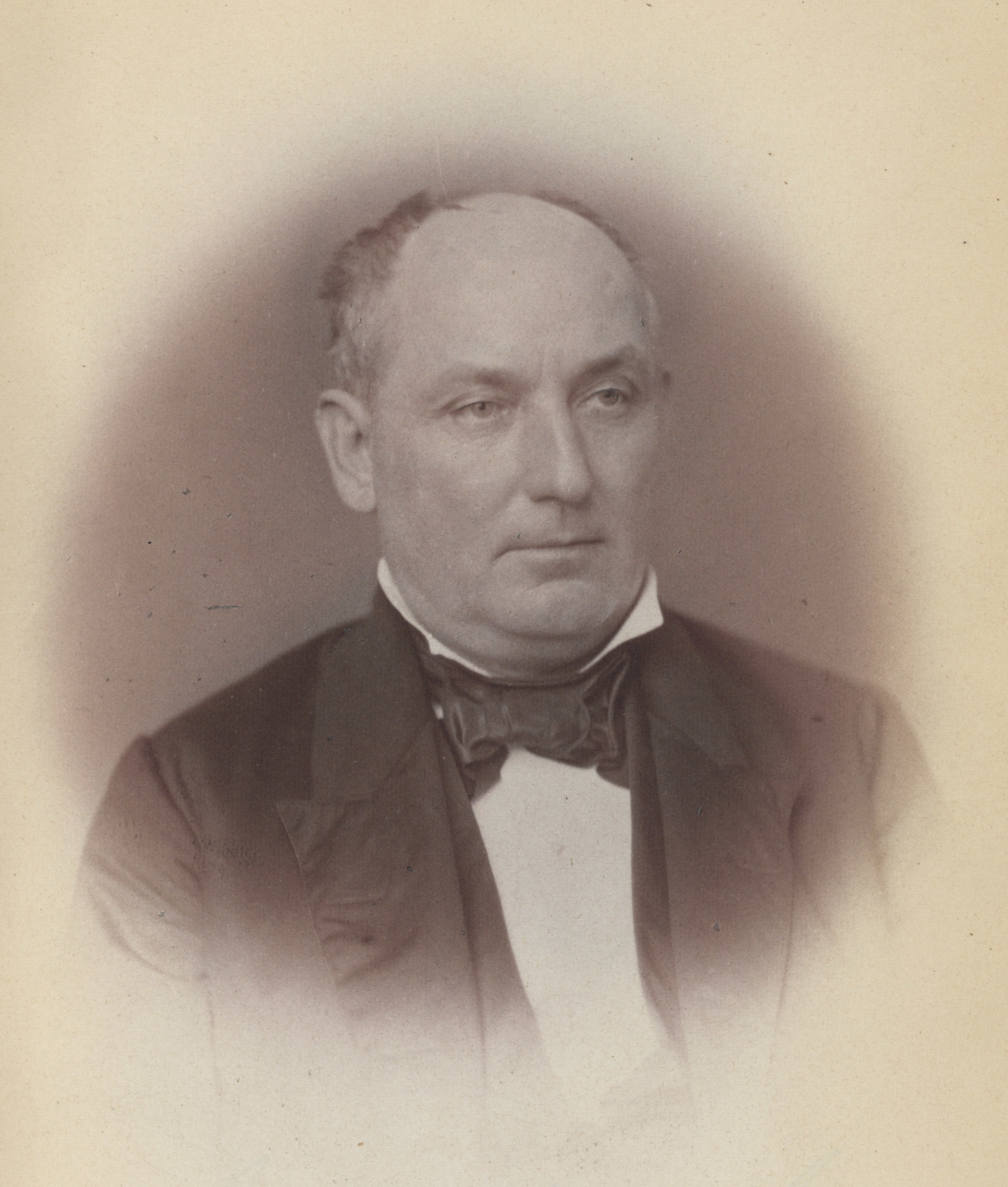

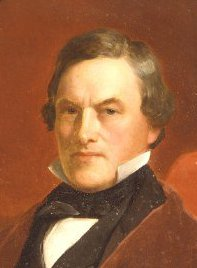
Nominee	James H. Hammond	Robert Francis Withers Allston
Party	Democratic	Democratic
Popular vote	83	76
Percentage	51.55%	47.21%
Governor before election
John Peter Richardson II
Democratic
Elected Governor
James H. Hammond
Democratic

The 1842 South Carolina gubernatorial election was held on December 8, 1842, in order to elect the Governor of South Carolina. Democratic candidate and former member of the United States House of Representatives from South Carolina's 4th district James H. Hammond was elected by the South Carolina General Assembly against fellow Democratic candidate and incumbent member of the South Carolina Senate Robert Francis Withers Allston.

== General election ==
On election day, December 8, 1842, Democratic candidate James H. Hammond was elected by the South Carolina General Assembly by a margin of 7 votes against his opponent fellow Democratic candidate Robert Francis Withers Allston, thereby retaining Democratic control over the office of Governor. Hammond was sworn in as the 60th Governor of South Carolina on January 3, 1843.

=== Results ===
South Carolina gubernatorial election, 1842
Party	Candidate	Votes	%
Democratic	James H. Hammond	83	51.55%
Democratic	Robert Francis Withers Allston	76	47.21%
	Scattering	2	1.24%
Total votes		161	100.00%
Democratic hold			
