= 1785 South Carolina gubernatorial election =

- May 10, 1785
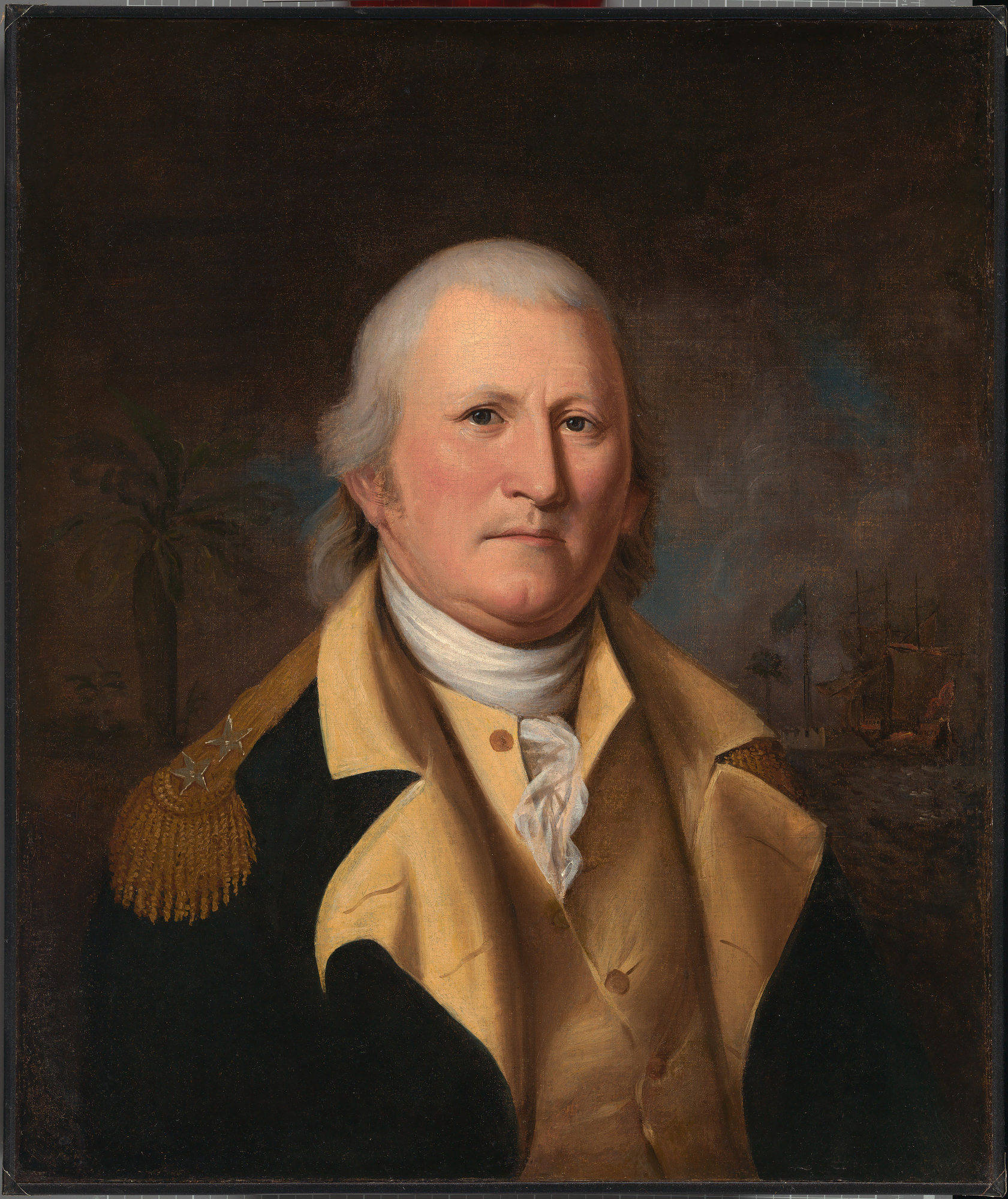
Nominee	William Moultrie
Party	Nonpartisan
Popular vote	Unknown
Percentage	Unknown
Governor before election
Benjamin Guerard
Nonpartisan
Elected Governor
William Moultrie
Nonpartisan

The 1785 South Carolina gubernatorial election was held on May 10, 1785, in order to elect the Governor of South Carolina. Incumbent Lieutenant Governor of South Carolina William Moultrie was elected by the South Carolina General Assembly as he ran unopposed. The exact number of votes cast in this election is unknown.

== General election ==
On election day, May 10, 1785, incumbent Lieutenant Governor of South Carolina William Moultrie was elected by the South Carolina General Assembly. Moultrie was sworn in as the 35th Governor of South Carolina that same day.

=== Results ===
South Carolina gubernatorial election, 1785
Party	Candidate	Votes	%
Nonpartisan	William Moultrie	Unknown	
Total votes		Unknown	
Nonpartisan hold			
