= 1862 South Carolina gubernatorial election =

- December 17, 1862
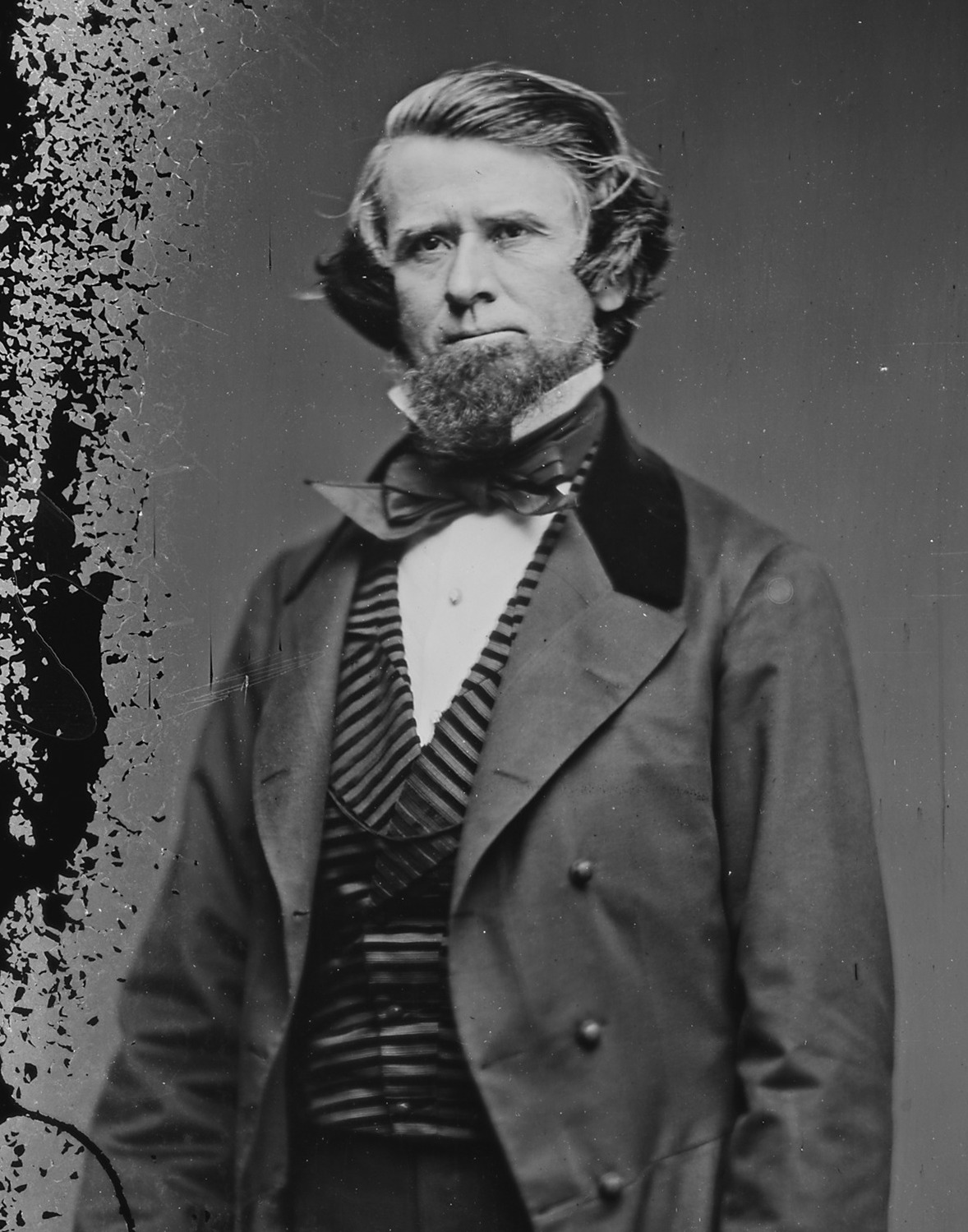
Nominee	Milledge Luke Bonham
Party	Democratic
Governor before election
Francis Wilkinson Pickens
Democratic
Elected Governor
Milledge Luke Bonham
Democratic

The 1862 South Carolina gubernatorial election was held on December 17, 1862, in order to elect the Governor of South Carolina. This was the first election held following South Carolina's succession from the Union and joining the Confederate States of America on February 4, 1861. Democratic candidate and former member of the Confederate House of Representatives from South Carolina's 4th District Milledge Luke Bonham was elected by the South Carolina General Assembly as he ran unopposed. The exact number of votes cast in this election is unknown.

== General election ==
On election day, December 17, 1862, Democratic candidate Milledge Luke Bonham was elected by the South Carolina General Assembly, thereby retaining Democratic control over the office of Governor. Bonham was sworn in as the 70th Governor of South Carolina on January 3, 1863.

=== Results ===
South Carolina gubernatorial election, 1862
Party	Candidate	Votes	%
Democratic	Milledge Luke Bonham	Unknown	100.00%
Total votes		Unknown	100.00%
Democratic hold			
