= 1776 South Carolina gubernatorial election =

- March 26, 1776
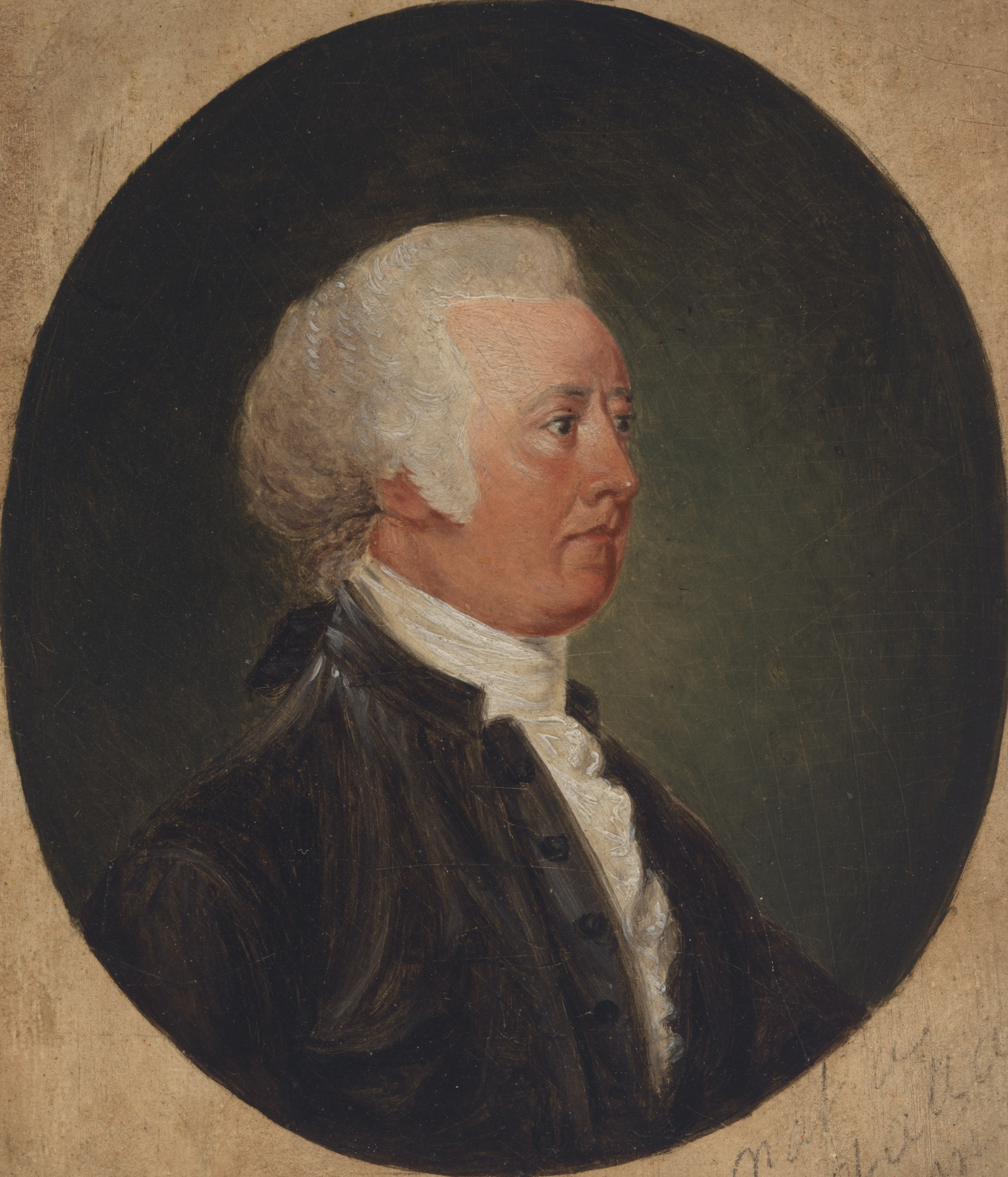
Nominee	John Rutledge
Party	Nonpartisan
Percentage	100.00%
President before election
Henry Laurens (as President of the Committee on Safety)
Nonpartisan
Elected President
John Rutledge
Nonpartisan

The 1776 South Carolina gubernatorial election was held on March 26, 1776, in order to elect the first President of South Carolina. The office would be renamed to Governor in 1778. Candidate and former Attorney General of South Carolina John Rutledge was elected by the South Carolina General Assembly as he ran unopposed. The exact number of votes cast in this election is unknown.

== General election ==
On election day, March 26, 1776, candidate John Rutledge was elected by the South Carolina General Assembly. Rutledge was sworn in as the 1st President of South Carolina on July 4, 1776.

=== Results ===
South Carolina gubernatorial election, 1776
Party	Candidate	Votes	%
Nonpartisan	John Rutledge	Unknown	100.00%
Total votes		Unknown	100.00%
Nonpartisan hold			
