= 1796 South Carolina gubernatorial election =

- December 4, 1796
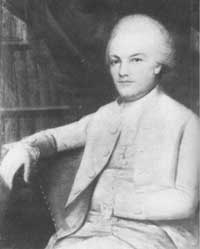

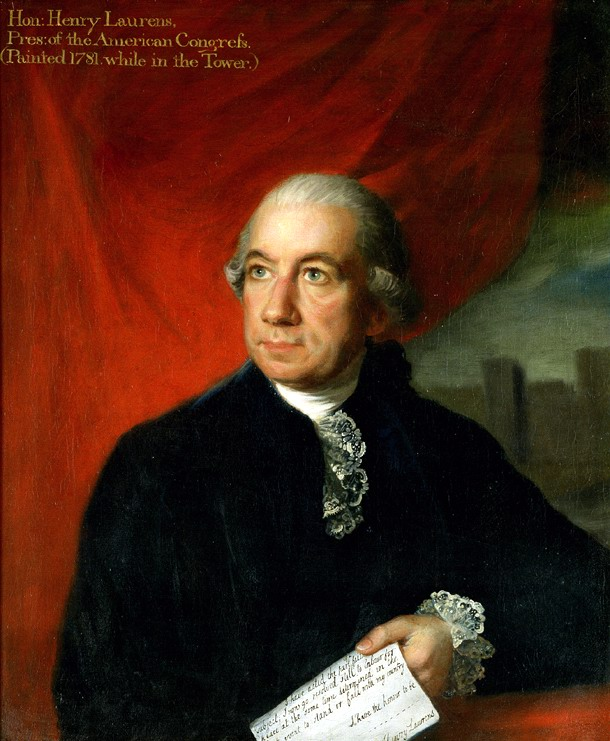
Nominee	Charles Pinckney	Henry Laurens
Party	Democratic-Republican	Independent
Popular vote	87	53
Percentage	62.14%	37.86%
Governor before election
Arnoldus Vanderhorst
Federalist
Elected Governor
Charles Pinckney
Democratic-Republican

The 1796 South Carolina gubernatorial election was held on December 4, 1796, in order to elect the Governor of South Carolina. Democratic-Republican candidate and former Governor Charles Pinckney was elected by the South Carolina General Assembly against Independent candidate and former Lieutenant Governor of South Carolina Henry Laurens.

== General election ==
On election day, December 4, 1796, Democratic-Republican candidate and former Governor Charles Pinckney was elected by the South Carolina General Assembly by a margin of 34 votes against his opponent Independent candidate Henry Laurens, thereby gaining Democratic-Republican control over the office of Governor. Pinckney was sworn in for his third overall term on December 8, 1796.

=== Results ===
South Carolina gubernatorial election, 1796
Party	Candidate	Votes	%
Democratic-Republican	Charles Pinckney	87	62.14%
Independent	Henry Laurens	53	37.86%
Total votes		140	100.00%
Democratic-Republican gain from Federalist			
