= 1800 South Carolina gubernatorial election =

- December 4, 1800
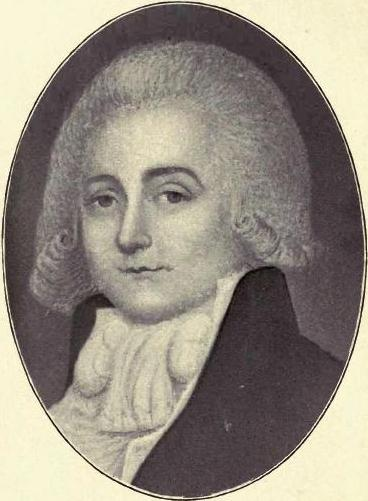
Nominee	John Drayton
Party	Democratic-Republican
Popular vote	1
Percentage	100.00%
Governor before election
John Drayton (Acting)
Democratic-Republican
Elected Governor
John Drayton
Democratic-Republican

The 1800 South Carolina gubernatorial election was held on December 4, 1800, in order to elect the Governor of South Carolina. Incumbent Democratic-Republican Acting Governor John Drayton was elected by the South Carolina General Assembly as he ran unopposed. The exact number of votes cast in this election is unknown.

== General election ==
On election day, December 4, 1800, incumbent Democratic-Republican Acting Governor John Drayton was elected by the South Carolina General Assembly, thereby gaining Democratic-Republican control over the office of Governor. Drayton was sworn in for a full term on January 3, 1801.

=== Results ===
South Carolina gubernatorial election, 1800
Party	Candidate	Votes	%
Democratic-Republican	John Drayton (incumbent)	1	100.00%
Total votes		1	100.00%
Democratic-Republican gain from Federalist			
