= 1826 South Carolina gubernatorial election =

- December 9, 1826
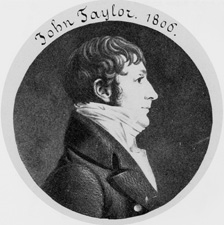
Nominee	John Taylor
Party	Democratic-Republican
Popular vote	1
Percentage	100.00%
Governor before election
Richard Irvine Manning I
Democratic-Republican
Elected Governor
John Taylor
Democratic-Republican

The 1826 South Carolina gubernatorial election was held on December 9, 1826, in order to elect the Governor of South Carolina. Democratic-Republican candidate and former United States Senator from South Carolina John Taylor was elected by the South Carolina General Assembly as he ran unopposed. The exact number of votes cast in this election is unknown.

== General election ==
On election day, December 9, 1826, Democratic-Republican candidate John Taylor was elected by the South Carolina General Assembly, thereby retaining Democratic-Republican control over the office of Governor. Taylor was sworn in as the 51st Governor of South Carolina on January 3, 1827.

=== Results ===
South Carolina gubernatorial election, 1826
Party	Candidate	Votes	%
Democratic-Republican	John Taylor	1	100.00%
Total votes		1	100.00%
Democratic-Republican hold			
