= 1832 South Carolina gubernatorial election =

- December 10, 1832
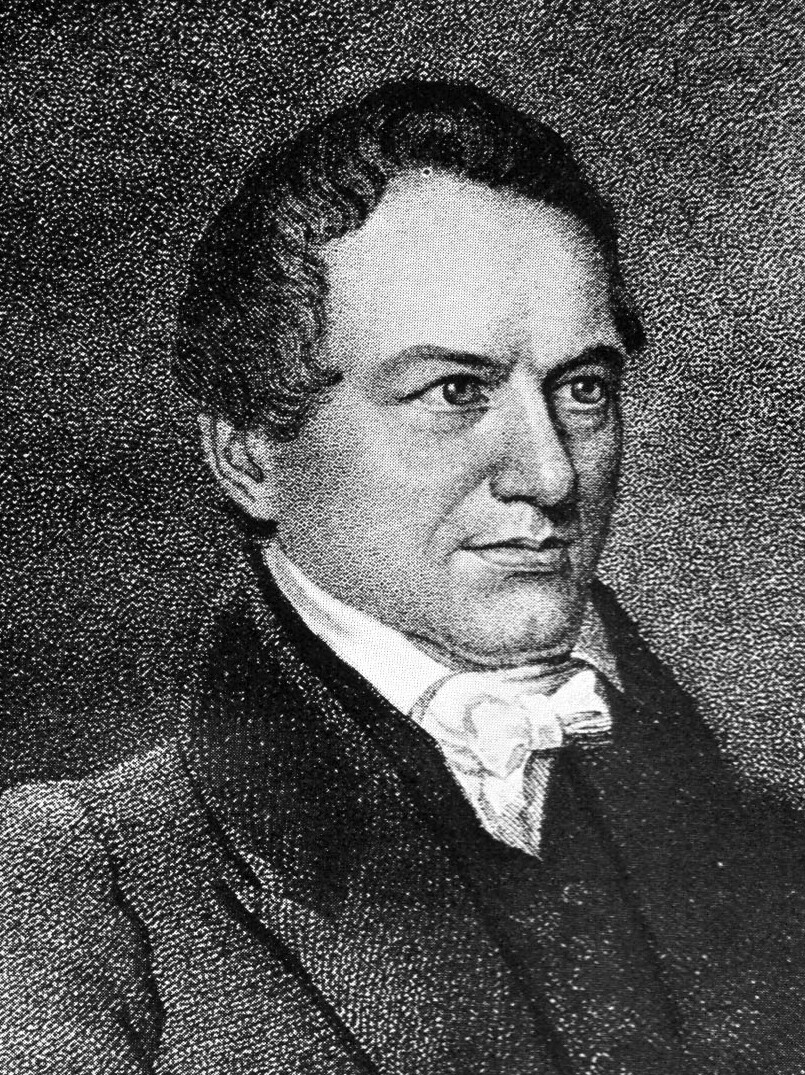
Nominee	Robert Y. Hayne
Party	Nullifier
Governor before election
James Hamilton Jr.
Nullifier
Elected Governor
Robert Y. Hayne
Nullifier

The 1832 South Carolina gubernatorial election was held on December 10, 1832, in order to elect the Governor of South Carolina. Nullifier candidate and incumbent United States Senator from South Carolina Robert Y. Hayne was elected by the South Carolina General Assembly as he ran unopposed. The exact number of votes cast in this election is unknown.

== General election ==
On election day, December 10, 1832, Nullifier candidate Robert Y. Hayne was elected by the South Carolina General Assembly, thereby retaining Nullifier control over the office of Governor. Hayne was sworn in as the 54th Governor of South Carolina on January 3, 1833.

=== Results ===
South Carolina gubernatorial election, 1832
Party	Candidate	Votes	%
Nullifier	Robert Y. Hayne	Unknown	100.00%
Total votes		Unknown	100.00%
Nullifier hold			
