= 1860 South Carolina gubernatorial election =

- December 14, 1860
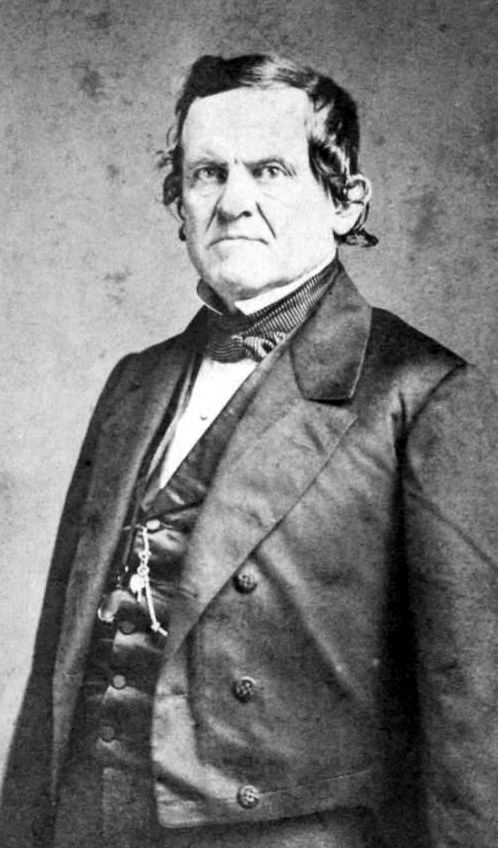
Nominee	Francis Wilkinson Pickens
Party	Democratic
Governor before election
William Henry Gist
Democratic
Elected Governor
Francis Wilkinson Pickens
Democratic

The 1860 South Carolina gubernatorial election was held on December 14, 1860, in order to elect the Governor of South Carolina. Democratic candidate and former United States Minister to Russia Francis Wilkinson Pickens was elected by the South Carolina General Assembly as he ran unopposed. The exact number of votes cast in this election is unknown.

== General election ==
On election day, December 14, 1860, Democratic candidate Francis Wilkinson Pickens was elected by the South Carolina General Assembly, thereby retaining Democratic control over the office of Governor. Pickens was sworn in as the 69th Governor of South Carolina that same day.

=== Results ===
South Carolina gubernatorial election, 1860
Party	Candidate	Votes	%
Democratic	Francis Wilkinson Pickens	Unknown	100.00%
Total votes		Unknown	100.00%
Democratic hold			
