= 1818 South Carolina gubernatorial election =

- December 8, 1818

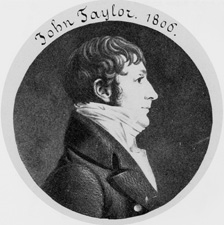
Nominee	John Geddes	John Taylor
Party	Democratic-Republican	Democratic-Republican
Popular vote	81	70
Percentage	52.94%	45.75%
Governor before election
Andrew Pickens
Democratic-Republican
Elected Governor
John Geddes
Democratic-Republican

The 1818 South Carolina gubernatorial election was held on December 8, 1818, in order to elect the Governor of South Carolina. Democratic-Republican candidate and incumbent member of the South Carolina Senate John Geddes was elected by the South Carolina General Assembly against fellow Democratic-Republican candidate and former United States Senator from South Carolina John Taylor.

== General election ==
On election day, December 8, 1818, Democratic-Republican candidate John Geddes was elected by the South Carolina General Assembly by a margin of 11 votes against his opponent fellow Democratic-Republican candidate John Taylor, thereby retaining Democratic-Republican control over the office of Governor. Geddes was sworn in as the 47th Governor of South Carolina on January 3, 1819.

=== Results ===
South Carolina gubernatorial election, 1818
Party	Candidate	Votes	%
Democratic-Republican	John Geddes	81	52.94%
Democratic-Republican	John Taylor	70	45.75%
	Scattering	2	1.31%
Total votes		153	100.00%
Democratic-Republican hold			
