= 1834 South Carolina gubernatorial election =

- December 9, 1834
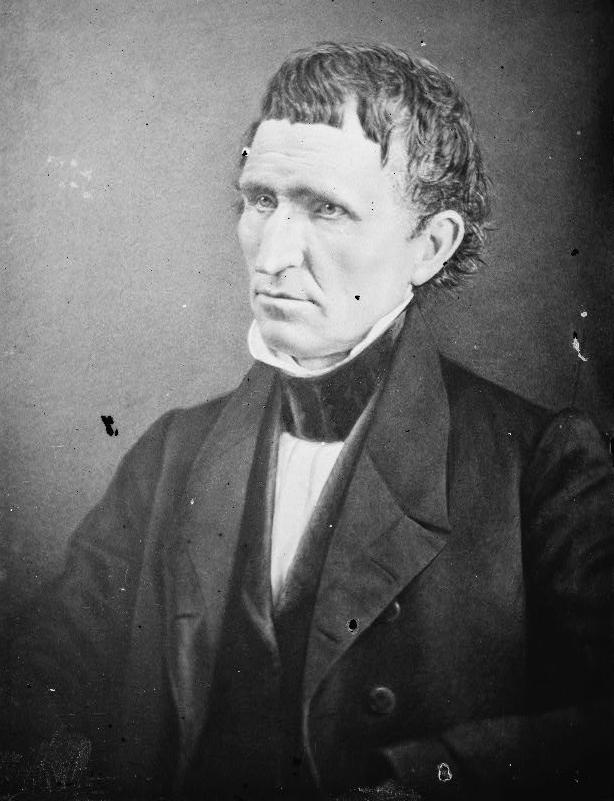
Nominee	George McDuffie
Party	Democratic
Governor before election
James Hamilton Jr.
Nullifier
Elected Governor
George McDuffie
Democratic

The 1834 South Carolina gubernatorial election was held on December 9, 1834, in order to elect the Governor of South Carolina. Democratic candidate and incumbent member of the U.S. House of Representatives from South Carolina's 5th district George McDuffie was elected by the South Carolina General Assembly as he ran unopposed. The exact number of votes cast in this election is unknown.

== General election ==
On election day, December 9, 1834, Democratic candidate George McDuffie was elected by the South Carolina General Assembly, thereby gaining Democratic control over the office of Governor. McDuffie was sworn in as the 55th Governor of South Carolina on January 17, 1835.

=== Results ===
South Carolina gubernatorial election, 1834
Party	Candidate	Votes	%
Democratic	George McDuffie	Unknown	100.00%
Total votes		Unknown	100.00%
Democratic gain from Nullifier			
