= 1791 South Carolina gubernatorial election =

- December 4, 1791
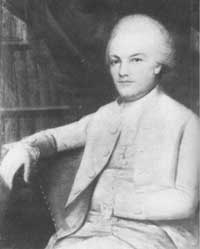

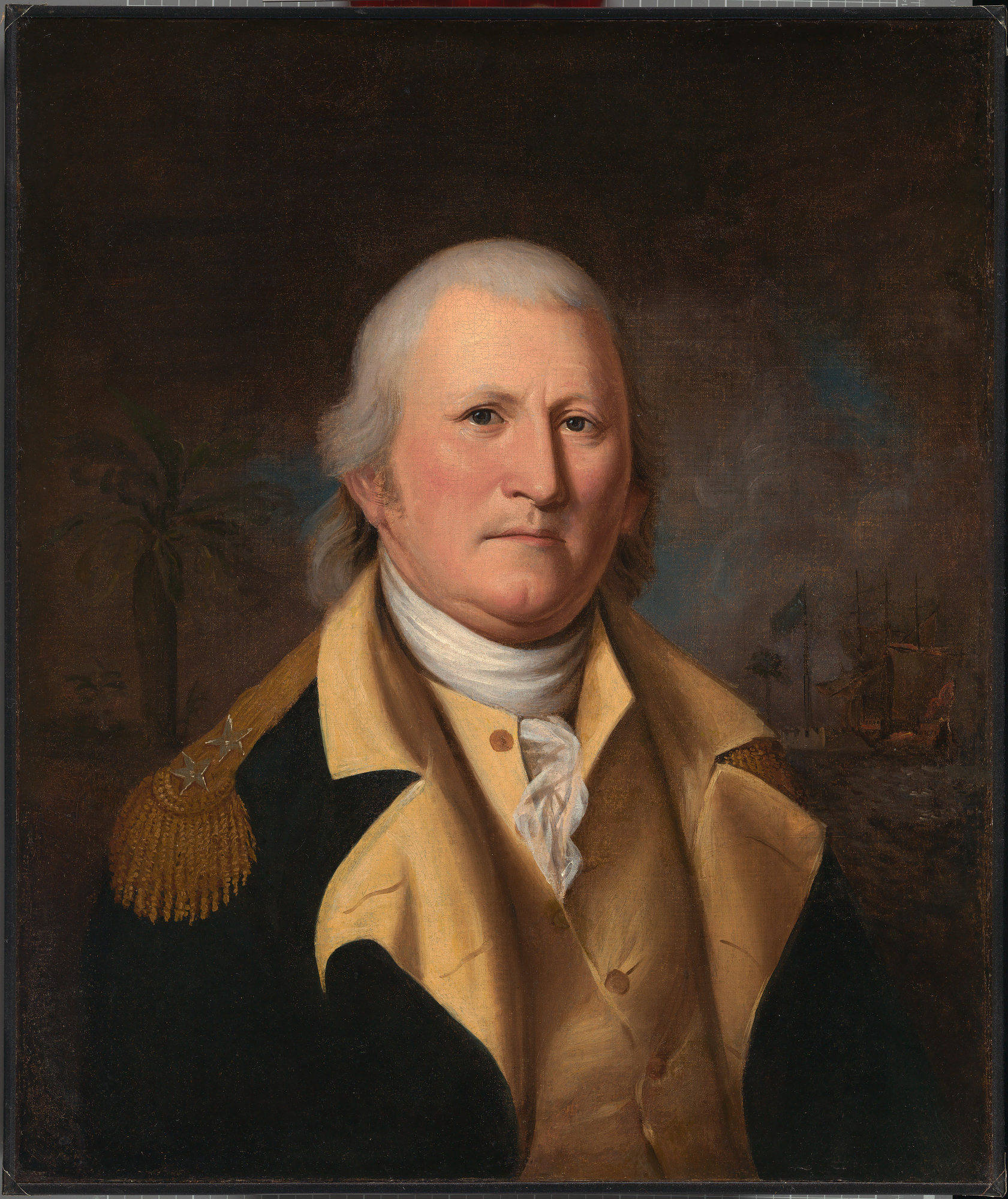
Nominee	Charles Pinckney	William Moultrie
Party	Nonpartisan	Nonpartisan
Popular vote	87	38
Percentage	69.60%	30.40%
Governor before election
Charles Pinckney
Nonpartisan
Elected Governor
Charles Pinckney
Nonpartisan

The 1791 South Carolina gubernatorial election was held on December 4, 1791, in order to elect the Governor of South Carolina. Incumbent Governor Charles Pinckney was re-elected by the South Carolina General Assembly against former Governor William Moultrie.

== General election ==
On election day, December 4, 1791, incumbent Governor Charles Pinckney was re-elected by the South Carolina General Assembly by a margin of 49 votes against his opponent former Governor William Moultrie. Pinckney was sworn in for his second term on December 5, 1791.

=== Results ===
South Carolina gubernatorial election, 1791
Party	Candidate	Votes	%
Nonpartisan	Charles Pinckney (incumbent)	87	69.60%
Nonpartisan	William Moultrie	38	30.40%
Total votes		125	100.00%
Nonpartisan hold			
