= 1854 South Carolina gubernatorial election =

- December 11, 1854
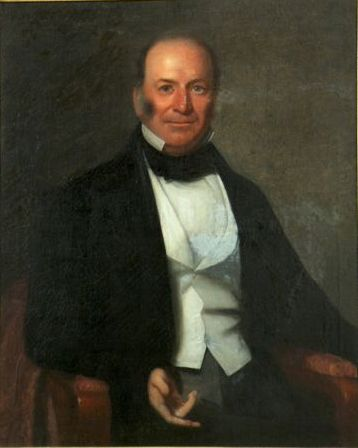
| Nominee | James Hopkins Adams |
| Party | Democratic |
Governor before election
John Lawrence Manning
Democratic
Elected Governor
James Hopkins Adams
Democratic

The 1854 South Carolina gubernatorial election was held on December 11, 1854, in order to elect the Governor of South Carolina. Democratic candidate and former member of the South Carolina Senate James Hopkins Adams was elected by the South Carolina General Assembly as he ran unopposed. The exact number of votes cast in this election is unknown.

== General election ==
On election day, December 11, 1854, Democratic candidate John Lawrence Manning was elected by the South Carolina General Assembly, thereby retaining Democratic control over the office of Governor. Adams was sworn in as the 66th Governor of South Carolina on January 3, 1855.

=== Results ===
South Carolina gubernatorial election, 1854
| Party | Candidate | Votes | % |
|---|---|---|---|
| Democratic | James Hopkins Adams | Unknown | 100.00% |
| Total votes | | Unknown | 100.00% |
| Democratic hold | | | |
