= 1810 South Carolina gubernatorial election =

- December 8, 1810
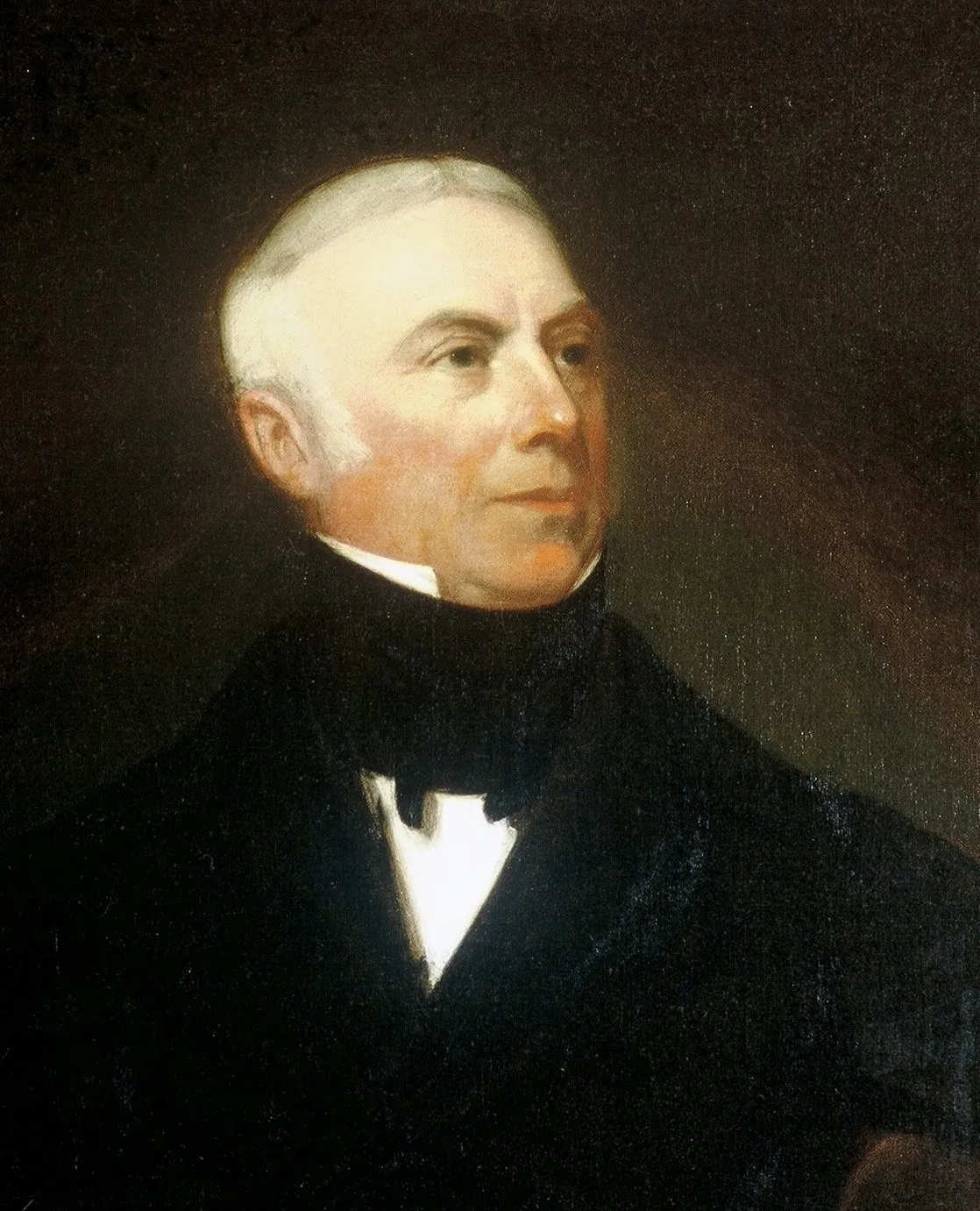

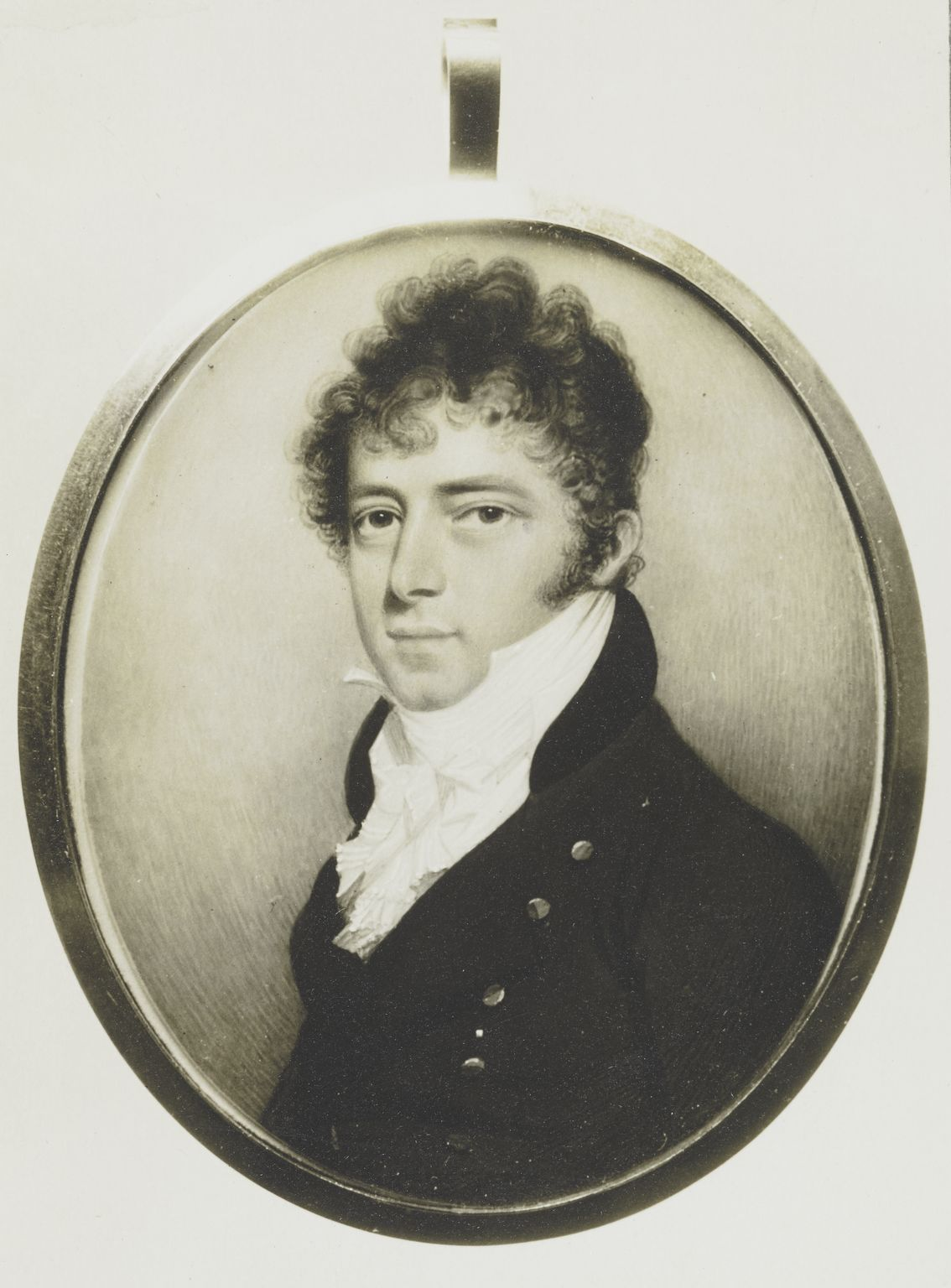
Nominee	Henry Middleton	Joseph Alston
Party	Democratic-Republican	Democratic-Republican
Popular vote	102	53
Percentage	65.81%	34.19%
Governor before election
John Drayton
Democratic-Republican
Elected Governor
Henry Middleton
Democratic-Republican

The 1810 South Carolina gubernatorial election was held on December 8, 1810, in order to elect the Governor of South Carolina. Democratic-Republican candidate and incumbent member of the South Carolina Senate Henry Middleton was elected by the South Carolina General Assembly against fellow Democratic-Republican candidate and incumbent Speaker of the South Carolina House of Representatives Joseph Alston.

== General election ==
On election day, December 8, 1810, Democratic-Republican candidate Henry Middleton was elected by the South Carolina General Assembly by a margin of 49 votes against his opponent fellow Democratic-Republican candidate Joseph Alston, thereby retaining Democratic-Republican control over the office of Governor. Middleton was sworn in as the 43rd Governor of South Carolina on January 3, 1811.

=== Results ===
South Carolina gubernatorial election, 1810
Party	Candidate	Votes	%
Democratic-Republican	Henry Middleton	102	65.81%
Democratic-Republican	Joseph Alston	53	34.19%
Total votes		155	100.00%
Democratic-Republican hold			
