= 1852 South Carolina gubernatorial election =

- December 9, 1852
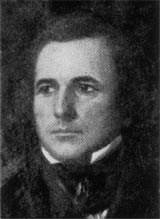
Nominee	John Lawrence Manning
Party	Democratic
Governor before election
John Hugh Means
Democratic
Elected Governor
John Lawrence Manning
Democratic

The 1852 South Carolina gubernatorial election was held on December 9, 1852, in order to elect the Governor of South Carolina. Democratic candidate John Lawrence Manning was elected by the South Carolina General Assembly as he ran unopposed. The exact number of votes cast in this election is unknown.

== General election ==
On election day, December 9, 1852, Democratic candidate John Lawrence Manning was elected by the South Carolina General Assembly, thereby retaining Democratic control over the office of Governor. Manning was sworn in as the 65th Governor of South Carolina on January 3, 1853.

=== Results ===
South Carolina gubernatorial election, 1852
Party	Candidate	Votes	%
Democratic	John Lawrence Manning	Unknown	100.00%
Total votes		Unknown	100.00%
Democratic hold			
