= 1838 South Carolina gubernatorial election =

- December 7, 1838
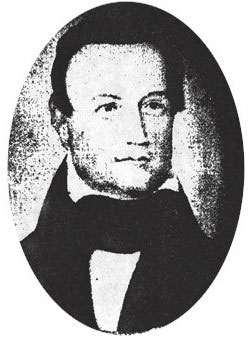
Nominee	Patrick Noble
Party	Democratic
Governor before election
Pierce Mason Butler
Democratic
Elected Governor
Patrick Noble
Democratic

The 1838 South Carolina gubernatorial election was held on December 7, 1838, in order to elect the Governor of South Carolina. Democratic candidate and incumbent President of the South Carolina Senate Patrick Noble was elected by the South Carolina General Assembly as he ran unopposed. The exact number of votes cast in this election is unknown.

== General election ==
On election day, December 7, 1838, Democratic candidate Patrick Noble was elected by the South Carolina General Assembly, thereby retaining Democratic control over the office of Governor. Noble was sworn in as the 57th Governor of South Carolina on January 3, 1839.

=== Results ===
South Carolina gubernatorial election, 1838
Party	Candidate	Votes	%
Democratic	Patrick Noble	Unknown	100.00%
Total votes		Unknown	100.00%
Democratic hold			
