= 1830 South Carolina gubernatorial election =

- December 9, 1830
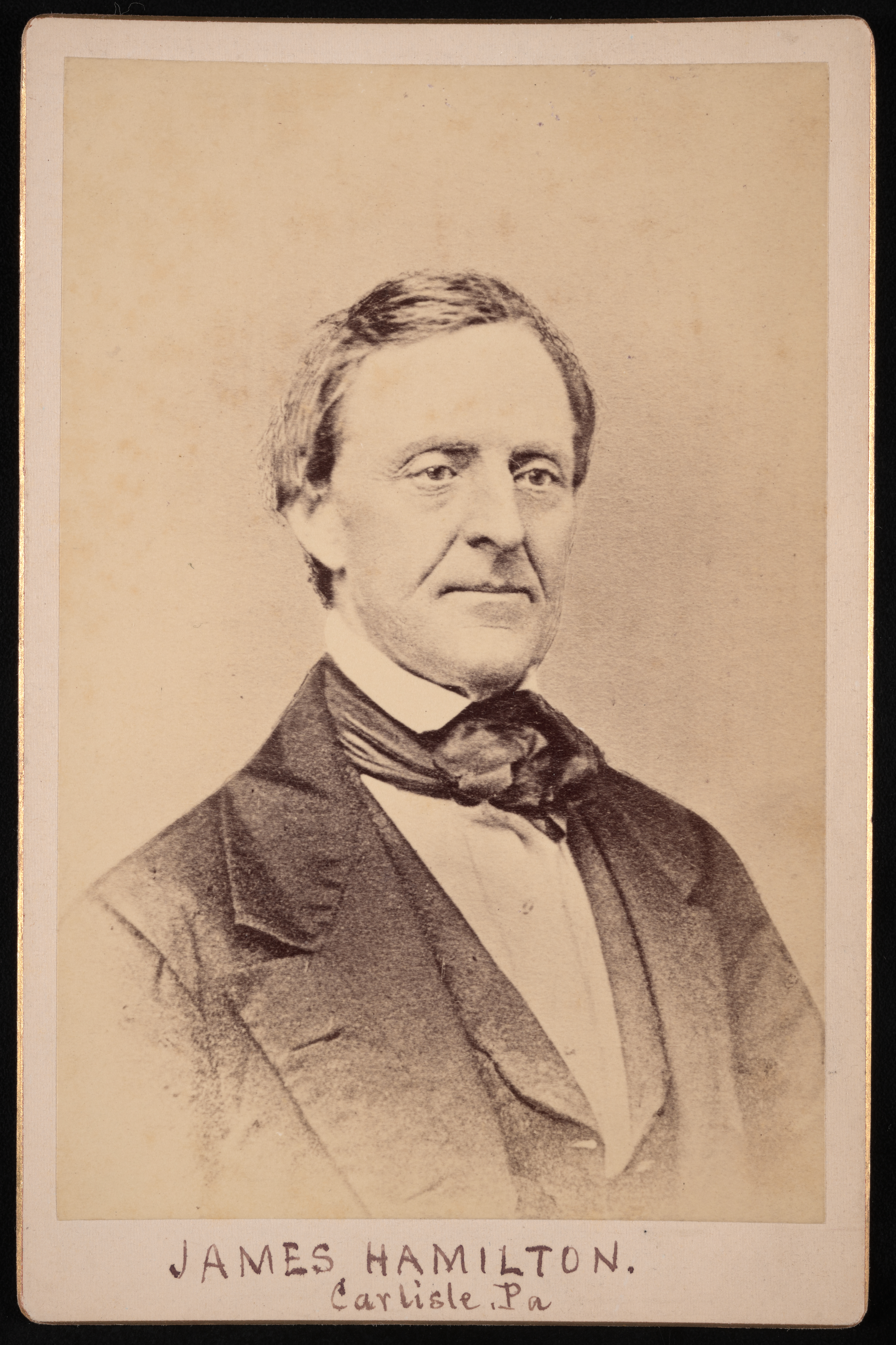
| Nominee | James Hamilton Jr. |
| Party | Nullifier |
Governor before election
Stephen Decatur Miller
Nullifier
Elected Governor
James Hamilton Jr.
Nullifier

The 1830 South Carolina gubernatorial election was held on December 9, 1830, in order to elect the Governor of South Carolina. Nullifier candidate and former member of the U.S. House of Representatives from South Carolina's 2nd district James Hamilton Jr. was elected by the South Carolina General Assembly as he ran unopposed. The exact number of votes cast in this election is unknown.

== General election ==
On election day, December 9, 1830, Nullifier candidate James Hamilton Jr. was elected by the South Carolina General Assembly, thereby retaining Nullifier control over the office of Governor. Hamilton was sworn in as the 53rd Governor of South Carolina on January 3, 1831.

=== Results ===
South Carolina gubernatorial election, 1830
| Party | Candidate | Votes | % |
|---|---|---|---|
| Nullifier | James Hamilton Jr. | Unknown | 100.00% |
| Total votes | | Unknown | 100.00% |
| Nullifier hold | | | |
