= 1820 South Carolina gubernatorial election =

- December 7, 1820
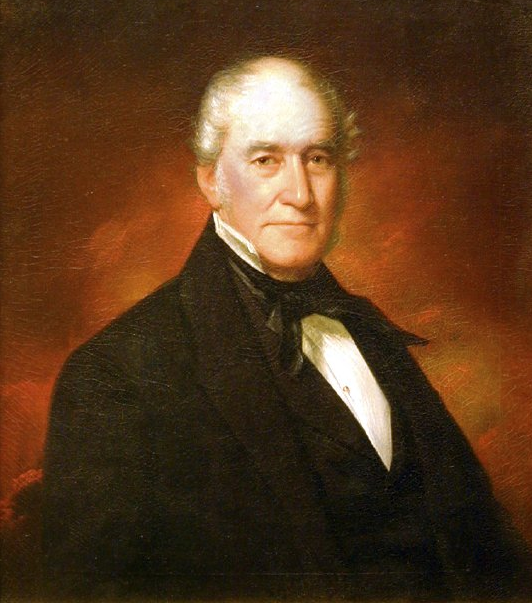

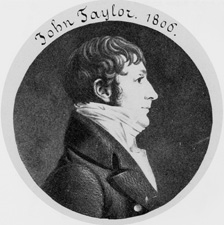
Nominee	Thomas Bennett Jr.	John Taylor
Party	Democratic-Republican	Democratic-Republican
Popular vote	113	47
Percentage	70.63%	29.37%
Governor before election
John Geddes
Democratic-Republican
Elected Governor
Thomas Bennett Jr.
Democratic-Republican

The 1820 South Carolina gubernatorial election was held on December 7, 1820, in order to elect the Governor of South Carolina. Democratic-Republican candidate and incumbent member of the South Carolina Senate Thomas Bennett Jr. was elected by the South Carolina General Assembly against fellow Democratic-Republican candidate and former United States Senator from South Carolina John Taylor.

== General election ==
On election day, December 7, 1820, Democratic-Republican candidate Thomas Bennett Jr. was elected by the South Carolina General Assembly by a margin of 66 votes against his opponent fellow Democratic-Republican candidate John Taylor, thereby retaining Democratic-Republican control over the office of Governor. Bennett was sworn in as the 48th Governor of South Carolina on January 3, 1821.

=== Results ===
South Carolina gubernatorial election, 1820
Party	Candidate	Votes	%
Democratic-Republican	Thomas Bennett Jr.	113	70.63%
Democratic-Republican	John Taylor	47	29.37%
Total votes		160	100.00%
Democratic-Republican hold			
