= 1782 South Carolina gubernatorial election =

- January 31, 1782
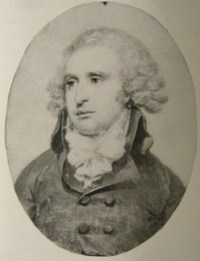
| Nominee | John Mathews |
| Party | Nonpartisan |
| Popular vote | 1 |
| Percentage | 100.00% |
Governor before election
John Rutledge
Nonpartisan
Elected Governor
John Mathews
Nonpartisan

The 1782 South Carolina gubernatorial election was held on January 31, 1782, in order to elect the Governor of South Carolina. Candidate and former Speaker of the South Carolina House of Representatives John Mathews was elected by the South Carolina General Assembly after their initial choice Christopher Gadsden declined to take the office. The exact number of votes cast in this election is unknown.

== General election ==
On election day, January 31, 1782, candidate John Mathews was elected by the South Carolina General Assembly. Mathews was sworn in as the 33rd Governor of South Carolina that same day.

=== Results ===
South Carolina gubernatorial election, 1782
| Party | Candidate | Votes | % |
|---|---|---|---|
| Nonpartisan | John Mathews | 1 | 100.00% |
| Total votes | | 1 | 100.00% |
| Nonpartisan hold | | | |
