= 1812 South Carolina gubernatorial election =

- December 10, 1812
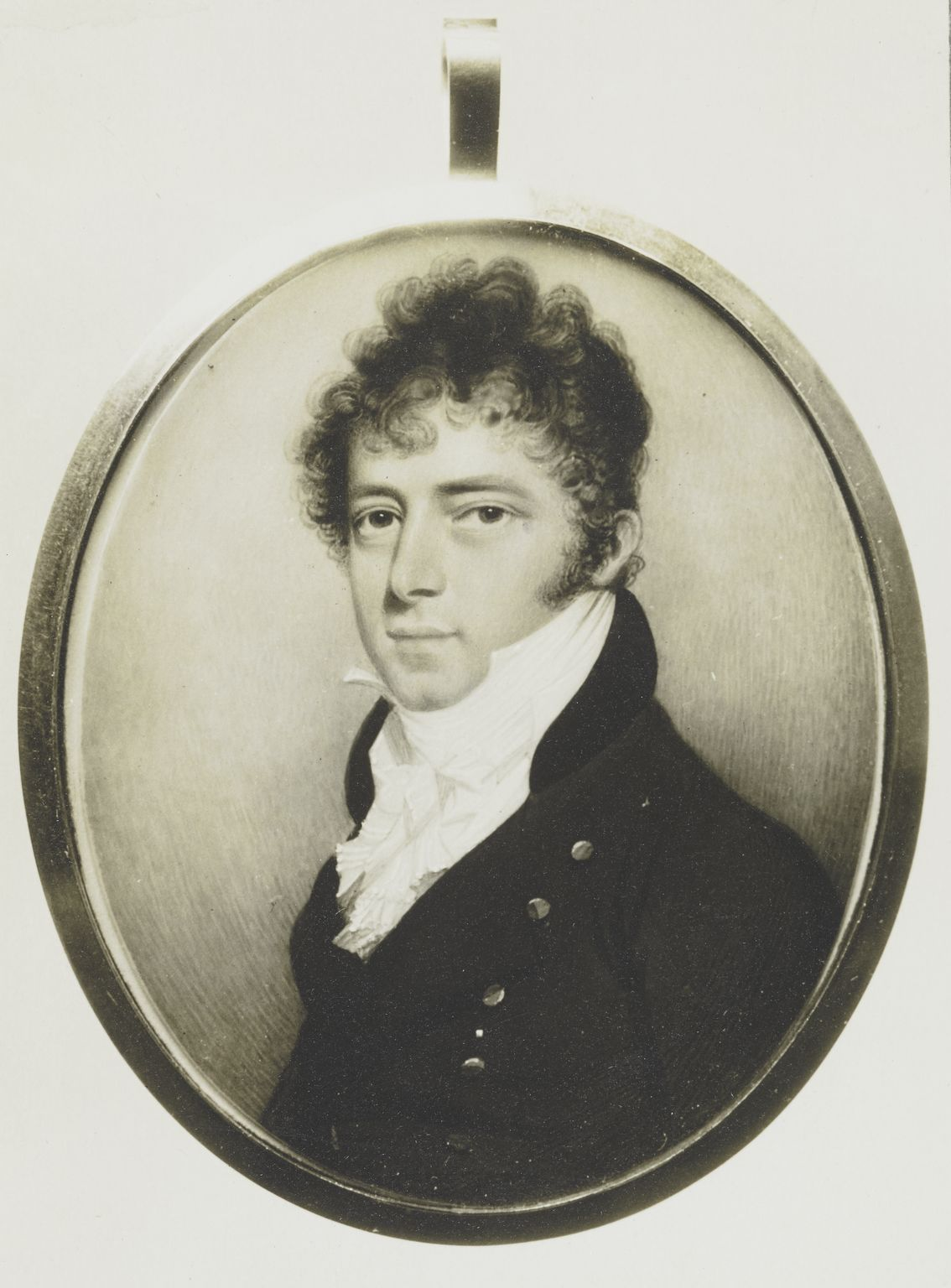

Nominee	Joseph Alston	John Geddes
Party	Democratic-Republican	Democratic-Republican
Popular vote	82	76
Percentage	51.90%	48.10%
Governor before election
Henry Middleton
Democratic-Republican
Elected Governor
Joseph Alston
Democratic-Republican

The 1812 South Carolina gubernatorial election was held on December 10, 1812, in order to elect the Governor of South Carolina. Democratic-Republican candidate and former Speaker of the South Carolina House of Representatives Joseph Alston was elected by the South Carolina General Assembly against fellow Democratic-Republican candidate and incumbent member of the South Carolina House of Representatives John Geddes.

== General election ==
On election day, December 10, 1812, Democratic-Republican candidate Joseph Alston was elected by the South Carolina General Assembly by a margin of 6 votes against his opponent fellow Democratic-Republican candidate John Geddes, thereby retaining Democratic-Republican control over the office of Governor. Alston was sworn in as the 44th Governor of South Carolina on January 3, 1813.

=== Results ===
South Carolina gubernatorial election, 1812
Party	Candidate	Votes	%
Democratic-Republican	Joseph Alston	82	51.90%
Democratic-Republican	John Geddes	76	48.10%
Total votes		158	100.00%
Democratic-Republican hold			
