= 1794 South Carolina gubernatorial election =

- December 17, 1794
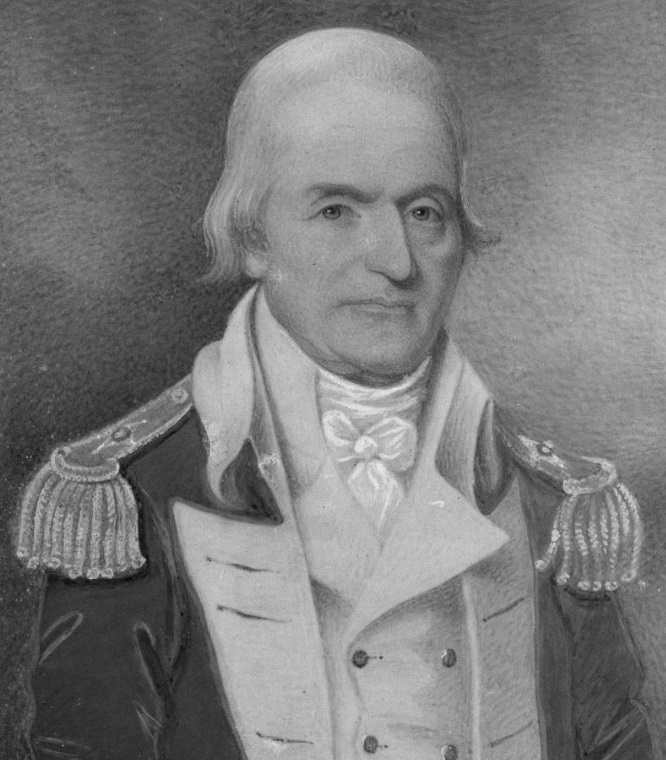
Nominee	Arnoldus Vanderhorst
Party	Federalist
Popular vote	Unknown
Percentage	Unknown
Governor before election
William Moultrie
Federalist
Elected Governor
Arnoldus Vanderhorst
Federalist

The 1794 South Carolina gubernatorial election was held on December 17, 1794, in order to elect the Governor of South Carolina. Federalist candidate and former Mayor of Charleston Arnoldus Vanderhorst was elected by the South Carolina General Assembly as he ran unopposed. The exact number of votes cast in this election is unknown.

== General election ==
On election day, December 17, 1794, Federalist candidate Arnoldus Vanderhorst was elected by the South Carolina General Assembly, thereby retaining Federalist control over the office of Governor. Vanderhorst was sworn in as the 38th Governor of South Carolina that same day.

=== Results ===
South Carolina gubernatorial election, 1794
Party	Candidate	Votes	%
Federalist	Arnoldus Vanderhorst	Unknown	
Total votes		Unknown	
Federalist hold			
