= 1840 South Carolina gubernatorial election =

- December 9, 1840
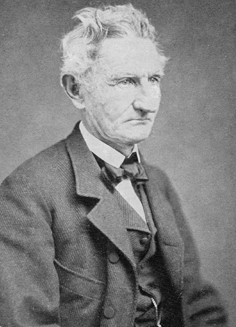
Nominee	John Peter Richardson II
Party	Democratic
Governor before election
Barnabas Kelet Henagan (Acting)
Democratic
Elected Governor
John Peter Richardson II
Democratic

The 1840 South Carolina gubernatorial election was held on December 9, 1840, in order to elect the Governor of South Carolina. Democratic candidate and former member of the United States House of Representatives from South Carolina's 8th district John Peter Richardson II was elected by the South Carolina General Assembly as he ran unopposed. The exact number of votes cast in this election is unknown.

== General election ==
On election day, December 9, 1840, Democratic candidate John Peter Richardson II was elected by the South Carolina General Assembly, thereby retaining Democratic control over the office of Governor. Richardson was sworn in as the 59th Governor of South Carolina on January 3, 1841.

=== Results ===
South Carolina gubernatorial election, 1840
Party	Candidate	Votes	%
Democratic	John Peter Richardson II	Unknown	100.00%
Total votes		Unknown	100.00%
Democratic hold			
