= 1864 South Carolina gubernatorial election =

- December 17, 1864
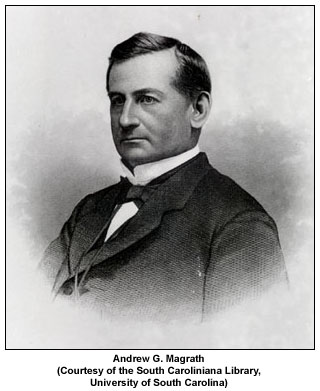
Nominee	Andrew Gordon Magrath
Party	Democratic
Governor before election
Milledge Luke Bonham
Democratic
Elected Governor
Andrew Gordon Magrath
Democratic

The 1864 South Carolina gubernatorial election was held on December 17, 1864, in order to elect the Governor of South Carolina. Democratic candidate and incumbent Judge of the Confederate States District Court for the District of South Carolina Andrew Gordon Magrath was elected by the South Carolina General Assembly as he ran unopposed. The exact number of votes cast in this election is unknown.

== General election ==
On election day, December 17, 1864, Democratic candidate Andrew Gordon Magrath was elected by the South Carolina General Assembly, thereby retaining Democratic control over the office of Governor. Magrath was sworn in as the 71st Governor of South Carolina on January 3, 1865.

=== Results ===
South Carolina gubernatorial election, 1864
Party	Candidate	Votes	%
Democratic	Andrew Gordon Magrath	Unknown	100.00%
Total votes		Unknown	100.00%
Democratic hold			
