= 1814 South Carolina gubernatorial election =

- December 5, 1814
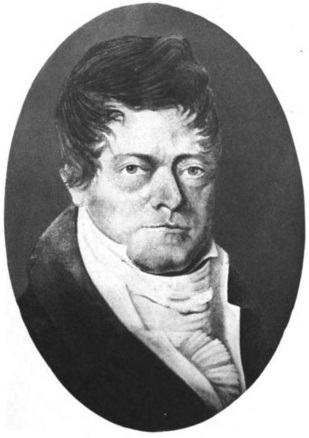

Nominee	David Rogerson Williams	John Geddes
Party	Democratic-Republican	Democratic-Republican
Popular vote	137	21
Percentage	85.63%	13.12%
Governor before election
Joseph Alston
Democratic-Republican
Elected Governor
David Rogerson Williams
Democratic-Republican

The 1814 South Carolina gubernatorial election was held on December 5, 1814, in order to elect the Governor of South Carolina. Democratic-Republican candidate and former member of the U.S. House of Representatives from South Carolina's 3rd district David Rogerson Williams was elected by the South Carolina General Assembly against fellow Democratic-Republican candidate and former Speaker of the South Carolina House of Representatives John Geddes.

== General election ==
On election day, December 5, 1814, Democratic-Republican candidate David Rogerson Williams was elected by the South Carolina General Assembly by a margin of 116 votes against his opponent fellow Democratic-Republican candidate John Geddes, thereby retaining Democratic-Republican control over the office of Governor. Williams was sworn in as the 45th Governor of South Carolina on January 3, 1815.

=== Results ===
South Carolina gubernatorial election, 1814
Party	Candidate	Votes	%
Democratic-Republican	David Rogerson Williams	137	85.63%
Democratic-Republican	John Geddes	21	13.12%
	Scattering	2	1.25%
Total votes		160	100.00%
Democratic-Republican hold			
