= 1856 South Carolina gubernatorial election =

- December 9, 1856
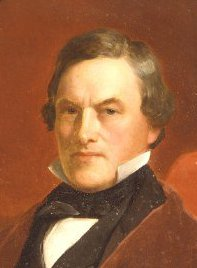
Nominee	Robert Francis Withers Allston
Party	Democratic
Governor before election
James Hopkins Adams
Democratic
Elected Governor
Robert Francis Withers Allston
Democratic

The 1856 South Carolina gubernatorial election was held on December 9, 1856, in order to elect the Governor of South Carolina. Democratic candidate and incumbent President of the South Carolina Senate Robert Francis Withers Allston was elected by the South Carolina General Assembly as he ran unopposed. The exact number of votes cast in this election is unknown.

== General election ==
On election day, December 9, 1856, Democratic candidate Robert Francis Withers Allston was elected by the South Carolina General Assembly, thereby retaining Democratic control over the office of Governor. Allston was sworn in as the 67th Governor of South Carolina on January 3, 1857.

=== Results ===
South Carolina gubernatorial election, 1856
Party	Candidate	Votes	%
Democratic	Robert Francis Withers Allston	Unknown	100.00%
Total votes		Unknown	100.00%
Democratic hold			
