= 1792 South Carolina gubernatorial election =

- December 4, 1792
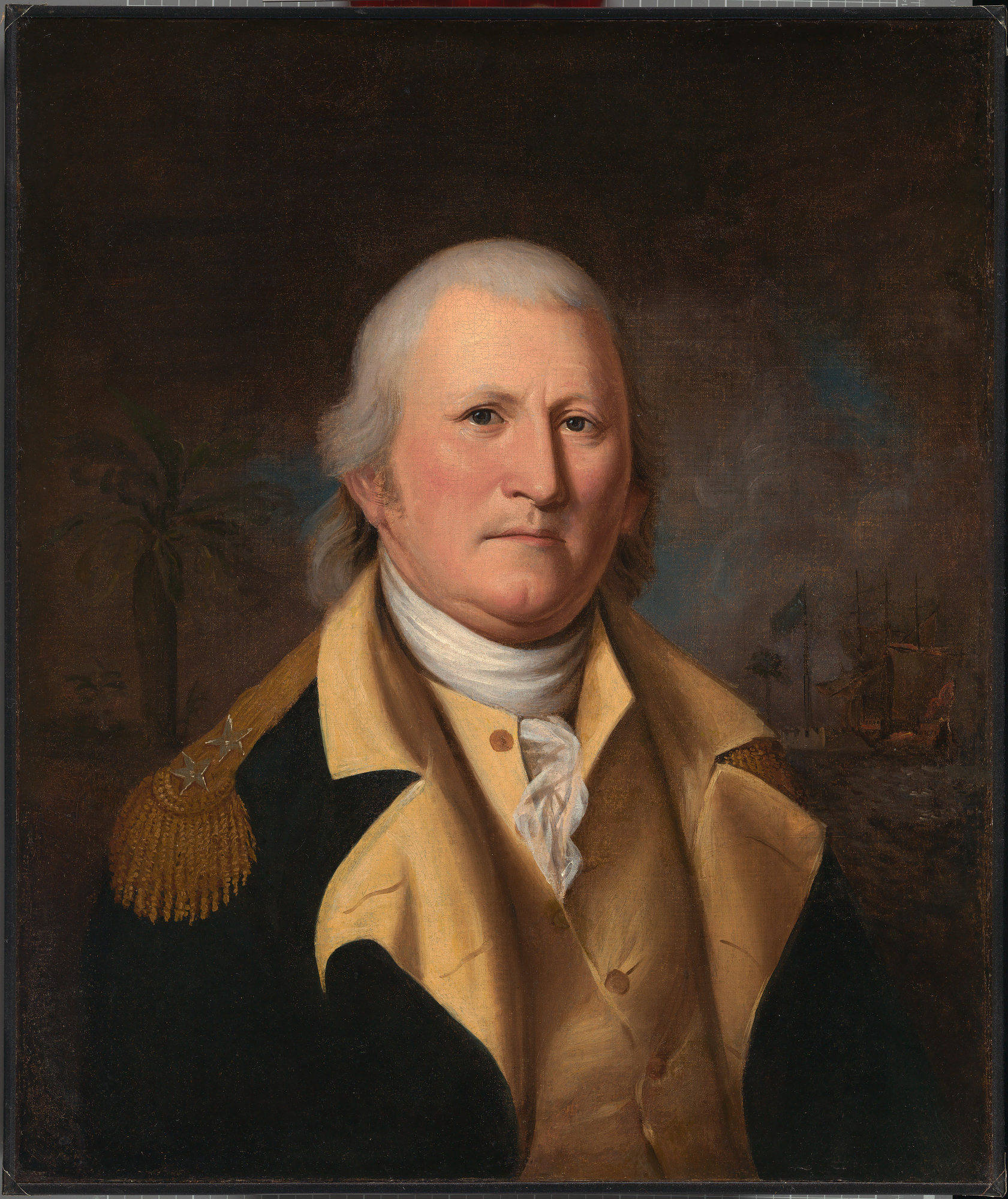
Nominee	William Moultrie
Party	Federalist
Popular vote	Unknown
Percentage	Unknown
Governor before election
Charles Pinckney
Nonpartisan
Elected Governor
William Moultrie
Federalist

The 1792 South Carolina gubernatorial election was held on December 4, 1792, in order to elect the Governor of South Carolina. Federalist candidate and former Governor William Moultrie was elected by the South Carolina General Assembly as he ran unopposed. The exact number of votes cast in this election is unknown.

== General election ==
On election day, December 4, 1792, Federalist candidate and former Governor William Moultrie was elected by the South Carolina General Assembly, thereby gaining Federalist control over the office of Governor. Moultrie was sworn in for his second non-consecutive term on December 5, 1792.

=== Results ===
South Carolina gubernatorial election, 1792
Party	Candidate	Votes	%
Federalist	William Moultrie	Unknown	
Total votes		Unknown	
Federalist gain from Nonpartisan			
