= 1779 South Carolina gubernatorial election =

- January 9, 1779
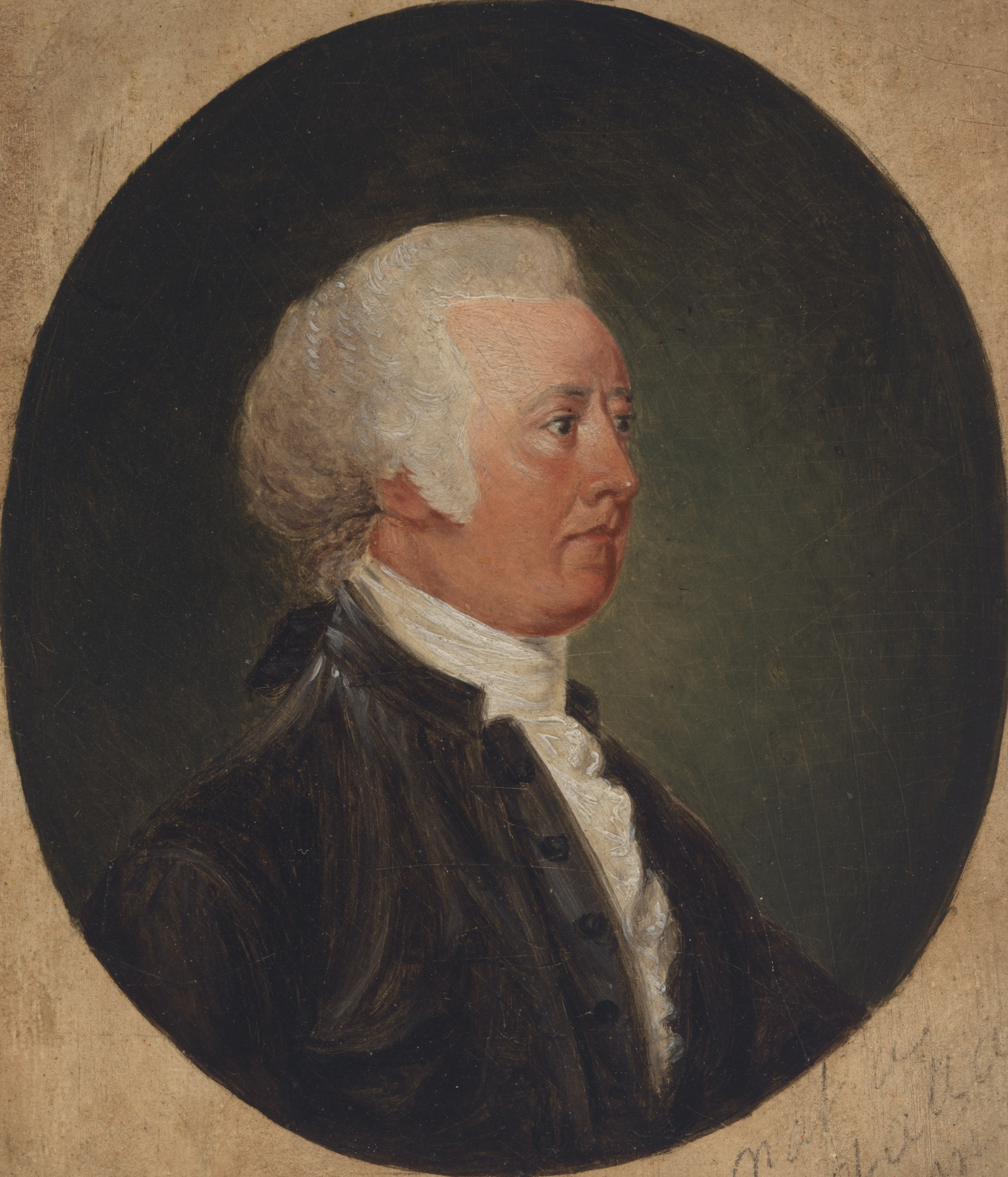
Nominee	John Rutledge
Party	Nonpartisan
Percentage	100.00%
Governor before election
Rawlins Lowndes
Nonpartisan
Elected Governor
John Rutledge
Nonpartisan

The 1779 South Carolina gubernatorial election was held on January 9, 1779, in order to elect the Governor of South Carolina. Former Governor John Rutledge was elected by the South Carolina General Assembly as he ran unopposed. The exact number of votes cast in this election is unknown.

== General election ==
On election day, January 9, 1779, Former Governor John Rutledge was elected by the South Carolina General Assembly. Rutledge was sworn in for his second non-consecutive term that same day.

=== Results ===
South Carolina gubernatorial election, 1779
Party	Candidate	Votes	%
Nonpartisan	John Rutledge	Unknown	100.00%
Total votes		Unknown	100.00%
Nonpartisan hold			
