= 1808 South Carolina gubernatorial election =

- December 8, 1808
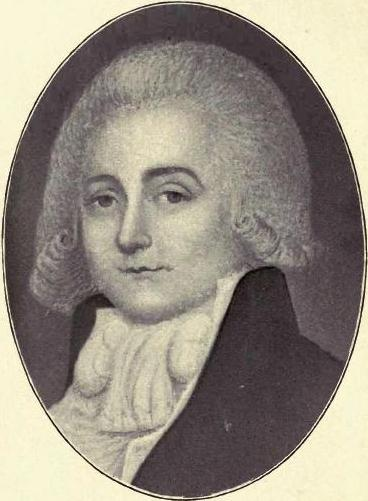
Nominee	John Drayton
Party	Democratic-Republican
Popular vote	1
Percentage	100.00%
Governor before election
Charles Pinckney
Democratic-Republican
Elected Governor
John Drayton
Democratic-Republican

The 1808 South Carolina gubernatorial election was held on December 8, 1808, in order to elect the governor of South Carolina. Former Democratic-Republican governor John Drayton was elected by the South Carolina General Assembly as he ran unopposed. The exact number of votes cast in this election is unknown.

== General election ==
On election day, December 8, 1808, former Democratic-Republican governor John Drayton was elected by the South Carolina General Assembly, thereby retaining Democratic-Republican control over the office of governor. Drayton was sworn in for his second overall term on January 3, 1809.

=== Results ===
South Carolina gubernatorial election, 1808
Party	Candidate	Votes	%
Democratic-Republican	John Drayton	1	100.00%
Total votes		1	100.00%
Democratic-Republican hold			
