= 1778 South Carolina gubernatorial election =

- March 19, 1778
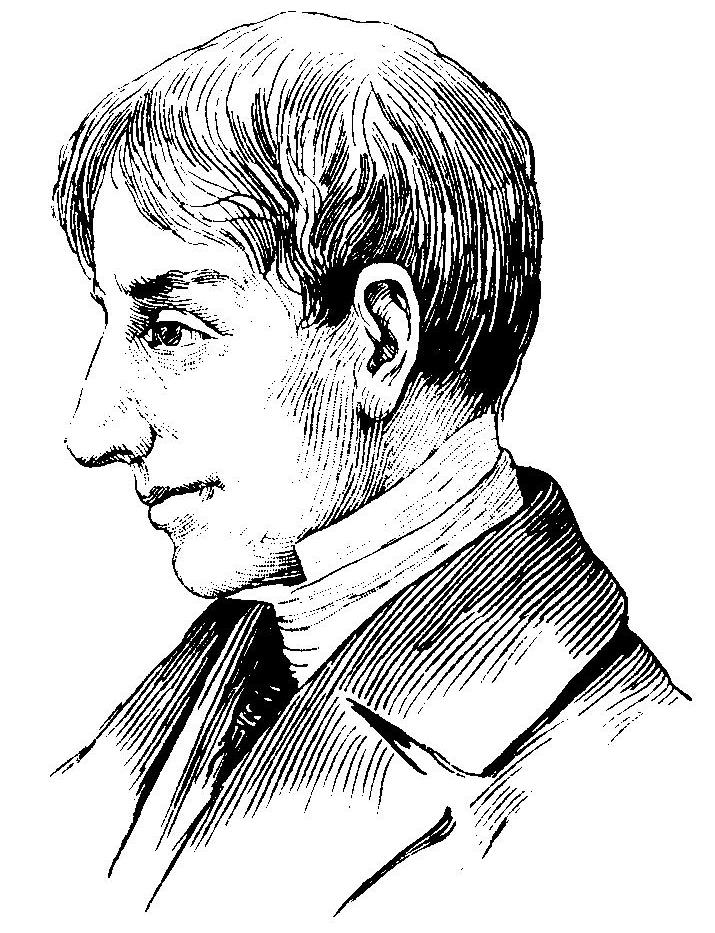
Nominee	Rawlins Lowndes
Party	Nonpartisan
Percentage	100.00%
President before election
Rawlins Lowndes (Acting)
Nonpartisan
Elected President
Rawlins Lowndes
Nonpartisan

The 1778 South Carolina gubernatorial election was held on March 19, 1778, in order to elect the President of South Carolina. The office would be renamed to Governor following this election. Incumbent Acting President Rawlins Lowndes was elected by the South Carolina General Assembly after their initial choice Arthur Middleton declined to take the office. The exact number of votes cast in this election is unknown.

== General election ==
On election day, March 19, 1778, incumbent Acting President Rawlins Lowndes was elected by the South Carolina General Assembly. Lowndes was sworn in as the 2nd President of South Carolina that same day.

=== Results ===
South Carolina gubernatorial election, 1778
Party	Candidate	Votes	%
Nonpartisan	Rawlins Lowndes (incumbent)	Unknown	100.00%
Total votes		Unknown	100.00%
Nonpartisan hold			
