= 1844 South Carolina gubernatorial election =

- December 7, 1844
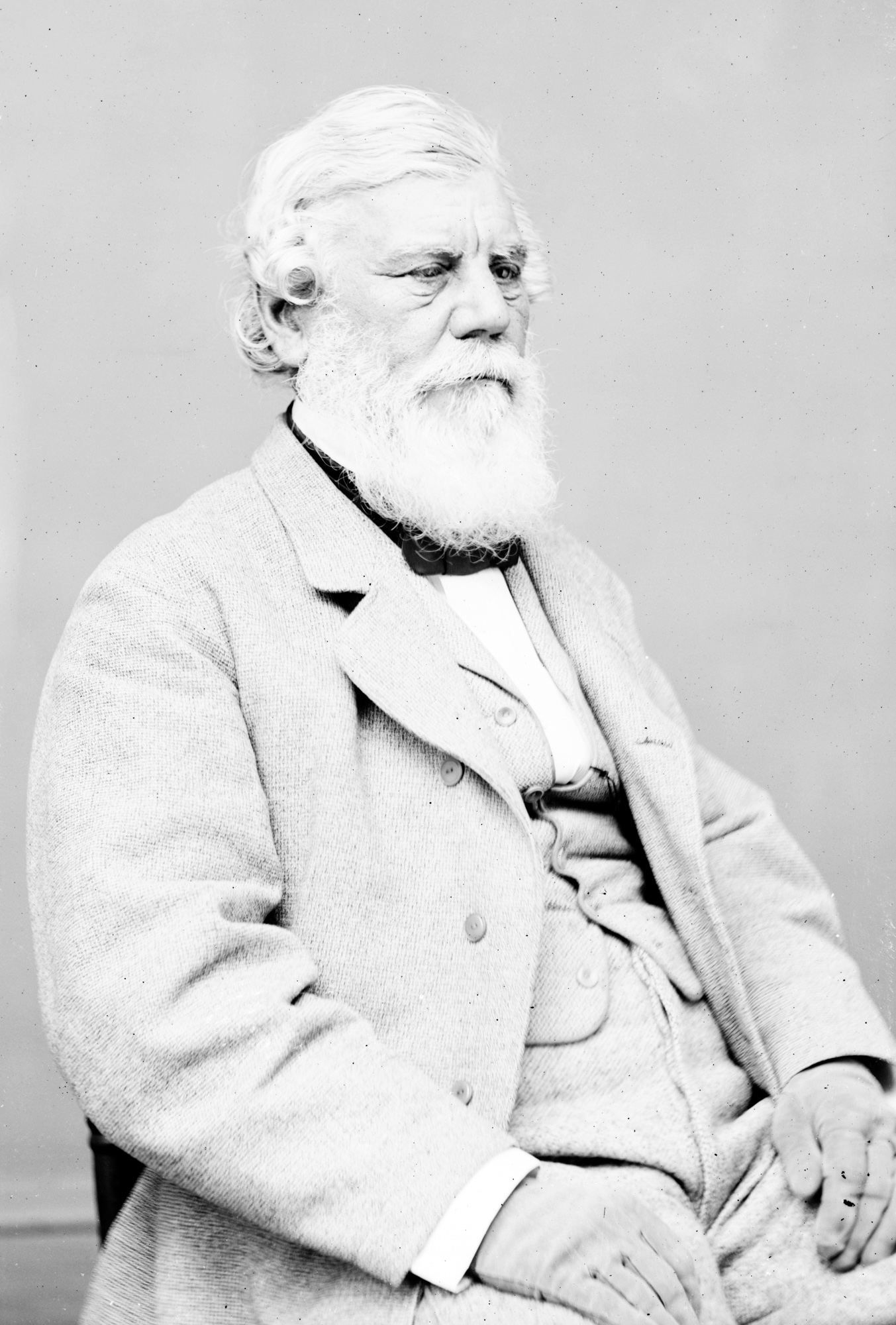
Nominee	William Aiken Jr.
Party	Democratic
Governor before election
James H. Hammond
Democratic
Elected Governor
William Aiken Jr.
Democratic

The 1844 South Carolina gubernatorial election was held on December 7, 1844, in order to elect the Governor of South Carolina. Democratic candidate and incumbent member of the South Carolina Senate William Aiken Jr. was elected by the South Carolina General Assembly as he ran unopposed. The exact number of votes cast in this election is unknown.

== General election ==
On election day, December 7, 1844, Democratic candidate William Aiken Jr. was elected by the South Carolina General Assembly, thereby retaining Democratic control over the office of Governor. Aiken was sworn in as the 61st Governor of South Carolina on January 3, 1845.

=== Results ===
South Carolina gubernatorial election, 1844
Party	Candidate	Votes	%
Democratic	William Aiken Jr.	Unknown	100.00%
Total votes		Unknown	100.00%
Democratic hold			
