= 1850 South Carolina gubernatorial election =

- December 13, 1850
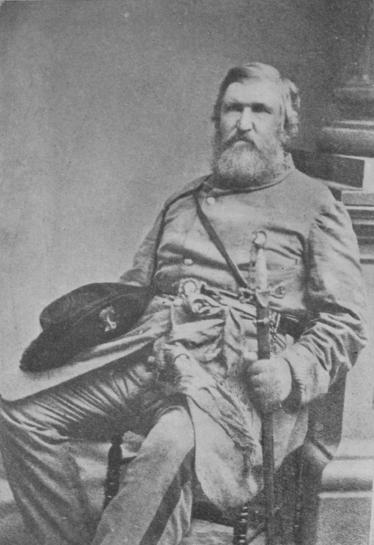
Nominee	John Hugh Means
Party	Democratic
Governor before election
Whitemarsh Benjamin Seabrook
Democratic
Elected Governor
John Hugh Means
Democratic

The 1850 South Carolina gubernatorial election was held on December 13, 1850, in order to elect the Governor of South Carolina. Democratic candidate John Hugh Means was elected by the South Carolina General Assembly as he ran unopposed. The exact number of votes cast in this election is unknown.

== General election ==
On election day, December 13, 1850, Democratic candidate John Hugh Means was elected by the South Carolina General Assembly, thereby retaining Democratic control over the office of Governor. Means was sworn in as the 64th Governor of South Carolina on January 3, 1851.

=== Results ===
South Carolina gubernatorial election, 1850
Party	Candidate	Votes	%
Democratic	John Hugh Means	Unknown	100.00%
Total votes		Unknown	100.00%
Democratic hold			
