= 1789 South Carolina gubernatorial election =

- January 21, 1789
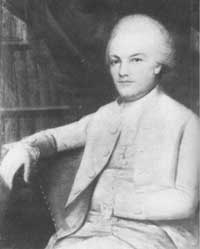
Nominee	Charles Pinckney
Party	Nonpartisan
Popular vote	Unknown
Percentage	Unknown
Governor before election
Thomas Pinckney
Nonpartisan
Elected Governor
Charles Pinckney
Nonpartisan

The 1789 South Carolina gubernatorial election was held on January 21, 1789, in order to elect the Governor of South Carolina. Candidate and former President of the South Carolina Senate Charles Pinckney was elected by the South Carolina General Assembly as he ran unopposed. The exact number of votes cast in this election is unknown.

== General election ==
On election day, January 21, 1789, candidate Charles Pinckney was elected by the South Carolina General Assembly. Pinckney was sworn in as the 37th Governor of South Carolina on January 26, 1789.

=== Results ===
South Carolina gubernatorial election, 1789
Party	Candidate	Votes	%
Nonpartisan	Charles Pinckney	Unknown	
Total votes		Unknown	
Nonpartisan hold			
