= David Johnson (South Carolina politician) =

American politician

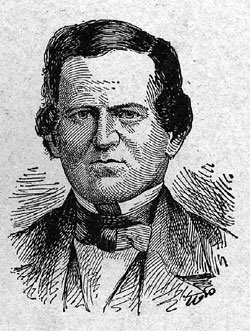

62nd Governor of South Carolina
- In office December 1, 1846 – December 1, 1848
- Lieutenant: William Cain
- Preceded by: William Aiken, Jr.
- Succeeded by: Whitemarsh Benjamin Seabrook

Chancellor of the South Carolina Court of Appeals
- In office December 1835 – December 5, 1846

Presiding Judge of the South Carolina Court of Appeals
- In office 1830 – December 1835

Judge of the South Carolina Court of Appeals
- In office December 18, 1824 – 1830

Member of the South Carolina House of Representatives from Union District
- In office November 26, 1810 – December 4, 1811

Personal details
- Born: October 3, 1782 Louisa County, Virginia, US
- Died: January 7, 1855 (aged 72) Cherokee County, South Carolina, US
- Resting place: Forest Lawn Cemetery, Union, South Carolina
- Party: Democratic
- Spouse: Barbara Courtney Asbury Herndon

David Johnson (October 3, 1782 – January 7, 1855) was an American lawyer, judge and politician who served as the 62nd governor of South Carolina. Born in Virginia and educated in South Carolina, Johnson had an extensive career as a lawyer and judge before being elected to a two year term as governor by the South Carolina General Assembly in 1846. His gubernatorial administration coincided with the Mexican–American War and the accompanying heated debate over the status of slavery in the territory taken from Mexico in the war.

== Early life and career ==
Born in Louisa County, Virginia, Johnson was educated in York County, but moved with his family to Chester District in 1789. He studied law in South Carolina and became a solicitor of the Union District in 1812 as well as being elected to the South Carolina House of Representatives.

Excelling in law, Johnson was made a circuit judge in 1815, a judge of the Court of Appeals in 1824, a presiding judge of the Court of Appeals in 1830 and a chancellor in 1835. During his time on the bench, Johnson was a noted Unionist because of his decision to strike down a militia oath to South Carolina and his view that a violation of a law of the United States was a violation of the law of South Carolina. His son-in-law was Confederate General John A. Wharton.

== As governor ==
The General Assembly elected Johnson as Governor of South Carolina in 1846 for a two-year term. The Mexican–American War occurred during his administration and the state aptly supported the cause. Much discussed was the Wilmot Proviso which would have outlawed slavery in the territory acquired from Mexico as a result of the war and it helped to further push the state towards the brink of secession. A Unionist would not become Governor of South Carolina again until the end of the Civil War when Benjamin Franklin Perry was appointed by President Andrew Johnson.

== Later life ==
After his term as governor, Johnson returned to Upstate South Carolina where he died on January 7, 1855. He was buried at Forest Lawn Cemetery in Union.

Political offices
Preceded by William Aiken, Jr.	Governor of South Carolina; 1846–1848	Succeeded by Whitemarsh Benjamin Seabrook
