= John Lyde Wilson =

American politician (1784–1849)

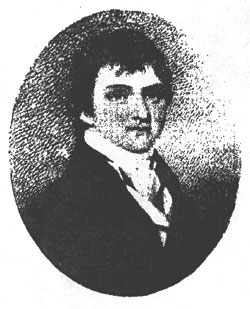

49th Governor of South Carolina
- In office December 1, 1822 – December 1, 1824
- Lieutenant: Henry Bradley
- Preceded by: Thomas Bennett Jr.
- Succeeded by: Richard Irvine Manning I

President of the South Carolina Senate
- In office November 25, 1822 – December 7, 1822
- Governor: Thomas Bennett Jr.
- Preceded by: Benjamin Huger
- Succeeded by: Jacob Bond I'On

Member of the South Carolina Senate from Georgetown District
- In office November 27, 1826 – November 22, 1830
- In office November 23, 1818 – December 7, 1822

Member of the South Carolina House of Representatives from Georgetown District
- In office November 25, 1816 – November 23, 1818
- In office November 23, 1812 – November 28, 1814

Member of the South Carolina House of Representatives from Marlboro District
- In office November 24, 1806 – November 28, 1808

Personal details
- Born: May 24, 1784 Marlboro County, South Carolina, US
- Died: February 12, 1849 (aged 64) Charleston, South Carolina, US
- Party: Democratic-Republican
- Spouse(s): Charlotte Alston; Rebecca Eden

John Lyde Wilson (May 24, 1784 – February 12, 1849) was the 49th governor of South Carolina from 1822 to 1824 and an ardent supporter of dueling.

== Early life and career ==
Born in Marlboro County, Wilson studied law in Baltimore and was admitted to the South Carolina bar in 1807. He practiced law in Georgetown and became active in politics by being elected to three non-consecutive terms to the South Carolina House of Representatives. Wilson gained election to the South Carolina Senate in 1818 and was chosen by his colleagues to be the president of the senate. In 1822, the General Assembly elected him as Governor of South Carolina for a two-year term.

== Governor ==
Governor Wilson believed in states' rights and assailed the U.S. Congress for carrying out internal improvements as a result of revenues brought in by the tariff of 1824. During his term as governor, Wilson advocated the humane reform of the Negro Laws and backed the incorporation of the Medical College of South Carolina in 1823.

== Later life and career ==
Wilson won re-election to the state Senate in 1826, but was pressed for impeachment by Thomas S. Grimké, who accused Wilson of being reckless with the State's finances, as governor. Having felt that his honor had been impugned, Wilson challenged Grimké to a duel. However, both sides agreed to "set aside their Differences" when the contingent funds were accounted for.

In 1832, Wilson participated in the Nullification Convention and was firmly committed to secession. He additionally served as a leader of a Lynching Club which acted as a vigilante group to enforce the law and maintain Southern sensibilities. When a mob went to the Charleston post office in 1835 to confiscate mail containing abolitionist literature, Wilson supported their efforts and endorsed their actions. Based mostly on personal experience, Wilson penned The Code of Honor in 1838 which described a set of guidelines for duelists and he argued that it would save lives instead of encouraging duels.

Wilson died on February 12, 1849, and was buried at St. Paul's Church in Charleston.

Political offices
Preceded by Thomas Bennett Jr.	Governor of South Carolina; 1822–1824	Succeeded by Richard Irvine Manning I
