= List of lieutenant governors of South Carolina =

The lieutenant governor of South Carolina is the second-in-command to the governor of South Carolina. This is a list of lieutenant governors of the U.S. state of South Carolina, 1730 to present.

== Royal period (1719–1776) ==
The lieutenant governor position was created by the British government under the control of the Board of Trade in 1729 for a term beginning on January 1, 1730. Prior to that, the Governor appointed a deputy governor to act in his stead during his absence. There were only three lieutenant governors during the Royal period and two were father and son.

Lieutenant governors of South Carolina (1730 to 1776)
No.	Image	Lieutenant Governor	Term in office	Governor	Notes	Monarch
1		Thomas Broughton	January 1, 1730 – November 22, 1737	Arthur Middleton	Died in office	George II
1		Thomas Broughton	January 1, 1730 – November 22, 1737	Robert Johnson	Died in office	George II
2		William Bull I	December 23, 1738 – March 21, 1755	James Glen	Died in office	George II
3		William Bull II	March 21, 1755 – March 26, 1776	James Glen	Son of his predecessor Died in office	George II
3		William Bull II	March 21, 1755 – March 26, 1776	William Lyttelton	Son of his predecessor Died in office	George III
3		William Bull II	March 21, 1755 – March 26, 1776	Thomas Boone	Son of his predecessor Died in office	George III
3		William Bull II	March 21, 1755 – March 26, 1776	Lord Charles Montagu	Son of his predecessor Died in office	George III
3		William Bull II	March 21, 1755 – March 26, 1776	Lord William Campbell	Son of his predecessor Died in office	George III

== Statehood period (1776–present) ==
=== Vice presidents under the Constitution of 1776 ===
The General Assembly chose the vice president for a term of two years.

Parties

No party (2)

Vice presidents of the State of South Carolina (1776 to 1779)
No.	Image	Vice President	Party	Term in office	President	Notes
4		Henry Laurens	Independent	March 26, 1776 – January 10, 1777	John Rutledge	Officially titled "Vice President"
Vacant				until June 24, 1777	John Rutledge	
5		James Parsons	Independent	June 24, 1777 – January 9, 1779	John Rutledge	Officially titled "Vice President"
5		James Parsons	Independent	June 24, 1777 – January 9, 1779	Rawlins Lowndes	Officially titled "Vice President"

=== Lieutenant governors in early and antebellum America ===
The General Assembly chose the lieutenant governor for a term of two years.

Parties

No party (6) Federalist (5) Democratic-Republican (16) Nullifier (Democratic) (3) Democratic (16)

Lieutenant governors of the State of South Carolina (1779 to 1865)
No.	Image	Lieutenant Governor	Party	Term in office	Governor	Notes
6		Thomas Bee	Independent	January 9, 1779 – January 24, 1780	John Rutledge	
7		Christopher Gadsden	Independent	January 24, 1780 – January 31, 1782	John Rutledge	
8		Richard Hutson	Independent	January 31, 1782 – February 4, 1783	John Mathews	
9		Richard Beresford	Independent	February 4, 1783 – March 15, 1783	Benjamin Guerard	Shortest term (39 days) Resigned (Note: Resigned after elected to the Congress of the Confederation.)
-	Vacant			until February 16, 1784	Benjamin Guerard	
10		William Moultrie	Independent	February 16, 1784 – February 11, 1785	Benjamin Guerard	
11		Charles Drayton	Independent	February 11, 1785 – February 20, 1787	William Moultrie	
12		Thomas Gadsden	Federalist	February 20, 1787 – January 26, 1789	Thomas Pinckney	
13		Alexander Gillon	Federalist	January 26, 1789 – February 15, 1791	Charles Pinckney	
14		Isaac Holmes	Federalist	February 15, 1791 – December 5, 1792	Charles Pinckney	
15		James Ladson	Federalist	December 5, 1792 – December 17, 1794	William Moultrie	
16		Lewis Morris	Federalist	December 17, 1794 – December 8, 1796	Arnoldus Vanderhorst	
17		Robert Anderson	Democratic-Republican	December 8, 1796 – December 18, 1798	Charles Pinckney	
18		John Drayton	Democratic-Republican	December 18, 1798 – January 23, 1800	Edward Rutledge	Succeeded to governorship (Note: Succeeded to the governorship when Governor John Drayton died in office.)
-	Vacant			until December 4, 1800		
19		Richard Winn	Democratic-Republican	December 4, 1800 – December 8, 1802	John Drayton	
20		Ezekiel Pickens	Democratic-Republican	December 8, 1802 – December 7, 1804	James Burchill Richardson	
21		Thomas Sumter Jr.	Democratic-Republican	December 7, 1804 – December 9, 1806	Paul Hamilton	
22		John Hopkins	Democratic-Republican	December 9, 1806 – December 10, 1808	Charles Pinckney	
23		Frederick Nance	Democratic-Republican	December 10, 1808 – December 8, 1810	John Drayton	
24		Samuel Farrow	Democratic-Republican	December 8, 1810 – December 10, 1812	Henry Middleton	
25		Eldred Simkins	Democratic-Republican	December 10, 1812 – December 10, 1814	Joseph Alston	
26		Robert Creswell	Democratic-Republican	December 10, 1814 – December 5, 1816	David Rogerson Williams	
27		John A. Cuthbert	Democratic-Republican	December 5, 1816 – December 8, 1818	Andrew Pickens	
28		William Youngblood	Democratic-Republican	December 8, 1818 – December 7, 1820	John Geddes	
29		William Pinckney	Democratic-Republican	December 7, 1820 – December 7, 1822	Thomas Bennett Jr.	
30		Henry Bradley	Democratic-Republican	December 7, 1822 – December 3, 1824	John Lyde Wilson	
31		William Bull	Democratic-Republican	December 3, 1824 – December 9, 1826	Richard Irvine Manning I	
32		James Witherspoon	Democratic-Republican	December 9, 1826 – December 10, 1828	John Taylor	
33		Thomas Williams	Nullifier (Democratic)	December 10, 1828 – December 9, 1830	Stephen Decatur Miller	
34		Patrick Noble	Nullifier (Democratic)	December 9, 1830 – December 10, 1832	James Hamilton Jr.	
35		Charles Cotesworth Pinckney II	Nullifier (Democratic)	December 10, 1832 – December 9, 1834	Robert Young Hayne	
36		Whitemarsh B. Seabrook	Democratic	December 9, 1834 – December 10, 1836	George McDuffie	
37		William DuBose	Democratic	December 10, 1836 – December 7, 1838	Pierce Mason Butler	
38		Barnabas Kelet Henagan	Democratic	December 7, 1838 – April 7, 1840	Patrick Noble	Succeeded to governorship (Note: Succeeded to the governorship when Governor Patrick Noble died in office.)
-	Vacant			until December 9, 1840		
39		William K. Clowney	Democratic	December 9, 1840 – December 8, 1842	John Peter Richardson II	
40		Isaac Donnom Witherspoon	Democratic	December 8, 1842 – December 7, 1844	James Henry Hammond	
41		John Fulton Ervin	Democratic	December 7, 1844 – December 7, 1846	William Aiken	
42		William Cain	Democratic	December 8, 1846 – December 12, 1848	David Johnson	
43		William Henry Gist	Democratic	December 12, 1848 – December 13, 1850	Whitemarsh B. Seabrook	
44		Joshua John Ward	Democratic	December 13, 1850 – December 9, 1852	John Hugh Means	
45		James Irby	Democratic	December 9, 1852 – December 11, 1854	John Lawrence Manning	
46		Richard de Treville	Democratic	December 11, 1854 – December 9, 1856	James Hopkins Adams	
47		Gabriel Cannon	Democratic	December 9, 1856 – December 10, 1858	Robert F.W. Allston	
48		M. E. Carn	Democratic	December 10, 1858 – December 14, 1860	William Henry Gist	
49		William Harllee	Confederate; Democratic	December 14, 1860 – December 17, 1862	Francis Wilkinson Pickens	
50		Plowden Weston	Confederate; Democratic	December 17, 1862 – January 25, 1864	Milledge Luke Bonham	Died in office (Note: Died of tuberculosis)
-	Vacant			until December 18, 1864		
51		Robert McCaw	Confederate; Democratic	December 18, 1864 – May 25, 1865	Andrew Gordon Magrath	Overthrown by Union Army at the end of the Civil War; government disestablished.
-	Office abolished until government reinstated under new constitution November 30, 1865					

=== Lieutenant governors post-Civil War through the present ===
First Constitution of South Carolina to provide for the direct election of the lieutenant governor.

- 2-year term, 1868-1927, no limit
- 4-year term, 1927–present, no limit

Legend: Democratic (32) Republican (9) No party (1)

Lieutenant governors of the State of South Carolina (1865 to 1868)
No.	Image	Lieutenant Governor	Party	Term in office	Election	Governor	Notes
52		William Porter	Independent	November 30, 1865 – July 6, 1868	1865	James Lawrence Orr	First popularly elected lieutenant governor
53		Lemuel Boozer	Republican	July 6, 1868 – December 3, 1870	1868	Robert Kingston Scott	
54		Alonzo J. Ransier	Republican	December 3, 1870 – December 7, 1872	1870	Robert Kingston Scott	First black lieutenant governor
55		Richard Howell Gleaves	Republican	December 7, 1872 – December 14, 1876	1872	Franklin J. Moses, Jr.	Second black lieutenant governor Haitian-American; Lost reelection (Note: Gleaves lost by 359 votes. Initially, the Republicans claimed that the Democrats committed voter fraud and that their majority was invalid. However, Republicans lost electoral support and were forced to concede. Gleaves, by all accounts of sources, did not refuse to leave office as Governor Daniel Henry Chamberlain did.)
55		Richard Howell Gleaves	Republican	December 7, 1872 – December 14, 1876	1874	Daniel Henry Chamberlain	Second black lieutenant governor Haitian-American; Lost reelection
-	Disputed				Disputed between Gleaves and William Dunlap Simpson. Two governments were formed during this time. Main article: Disputed government of South Carolina of 1876-77		
56		William Dunlap Simpson	Democratic	December 14, 1876 – February 26, 1879	1876	Wade Hampton III	Succeeded to governorship (Note: Succeeded to the governorship when Governor Wade Hampton III resigned to become a U.S. Senator)
56		William Dunlap Simpson	Democratic	December 14, 1876 – February 26, 1879	1878	Wade Hampton III	Succeeded to governorship
-	Vacant			until November 30, 1880			
57		John D. Kennedy	Democratic	November 30, 1880 – December 1, 1882	1880	Johnson Hagood	
58		John Calhoun Sheppard	Democratic	December 1, 1882 – July 10, 1886	1882	Hugh Smith Thompson	Succeeded to governorship (Note: Succeeded to the governorship when Governor Hugh Thompson resigned to become the assistant Secretary of the Treasury under the Grover Cleveland administration.)
58		John Calhoun Sheppard	Democratic	December 1, 1882 – July 10, 1886	1884	Hugh Smith Thompson	Succeeded to governorship
-	Vacant			until November 30, 1886			
59		William L. Mauldin	Democratic	December 30, 1886 – December 4, 1890	1886	Hugh Smith Thompson	
59		William L. Mauldin	Democratic	December 30, 1886 – December 4, 1890	1888	Hugh Smith Thompson	
60		Eugene B. Gary	Democratic	December 4, 1890 – December 22, 1893	1890	Benjamin Tillman	Resigned (Note: Resigned to take position of associate justice on the South Carolina Supreme Court.)
60		Eugene B. Gary	Democratic	December 4, 1890 – December 22, 1893	1892	Benjamin Tillman	Resigned
61		Washington H. Timmerman	Democratic	December 22, 1893 – January 18, 1897	1892	Benjamin Tillman	
61		Washington H. Timmerman	Democratic	December 22, 1893 – January 18, 1897	1894	John Gary Evans	
62		Miles Benjamin McSweeney	Democratic	January 18, 1897 – June 2, 1899	1896	William Haselden Ellerbe	Succeeded to governorship (Note: Succeeded to governorship when Governor William Ellerbe died in office.)
62		Miles Benjamin McSweeney	Democratic	January 18, 1897 – June 2, 1899	1898	William Haselden Ellerbe	Succeeded to governorship
63		Robert B. Scarborough	Democratic	June 2, 1899 – January 15, 1901	1898	Miles Benjamin McSweeney	Not elected
64		James Tillman	Democratic	January 15, 1901 – January 20, 1903	1900	Miles Benjamin McSweeney	
65		John Sloan	Democratic	January 20, 1903 – January 15, 1907	1902	Duncan Clinch Heyward	
65		John Sloan	Democratic	January 20, 1903 – January 15, 1907	1904	Duncan Clinch Heyward	
66		Thomas Gordon McLeod	Democratic	January 15, 1907 – January 17, 1911	1906	Martin Frederick Ansel	
66		Thomas Gordon McLeod	Democratic	January 15, 1907 – January 17, 1911	1908	Martin Frederick Ansel	
67		Charles Aurelius Smith	Democratic	January 17, 1911 – January 14, 1915	1910	Coleman Livingston Blease	Succeeded to governorship (Note: Succeeded to governorship for five days when Governor Coleman Blease resigned to avoid attending the innaguration of his successor)
67		Charles Aurelius Smith	Democratic	January 17, 1911 – January 14, 1915	1912	Coleman Livingston Blease	Succeeded to governorship
-	Vacant			until January 19, 1915			
68		Andrew Bethea	Democratic	January 19, 1915 – January 21, 1919	1914	Richard Irvine Manning III	
68		Andrew Bethea	Democratic	January 19, 1915 – January 21, 1919	1916	Richard Irvine Manning III	
69		Junius T. Liles	Democratic	January 21, 1919 – January 18, 1921	1918	Robert Archer Cooper	
70		Wilson Godfrey Harvey	Democratic	January 18, 1921 – May 20, 1922	1920	Robert Archer Cooper	Succeeded to governorship (Note: Succeeded to governorship when Governor Robert Cooper resigned to take a position on the Federal Farm Loan Board.)
-	Vacant			until January 16, 1923			
71		E. B. Jackson	Democratic	January 16, 1923 – January 18, 1927	1922	Thomas Gordon McLeod	
71		E. B. Jackson	Democratic	January 16, 1923 – January 18, 1927	1924	Thomas Gordon McLeod	
72		Thomas Bothwell Butler	Democratic	January 18, 1927 – January 5, 1931	1926	John Gardiner Richards, Jr.	First elected to four-year term Died in office
-	Vacant			until January 20, 1931			
73		James O. Sheppard	Democratic	January 20, 1931 – January 15, 1935	1930	Ibra Charles Blackwood	
74		Joseph Emile Harley	Democratic	January 15, 1935 – November 4, 1941	1934	Olin D. Johnston	Succeeded to governorship (Note: Succeeded to governorship when Governor Burnet Maybank resigned to become a United States senator.)
74		Joseph Emile Harley	Democratic	January 15, 1935 – November 4, 1941	1938	Burnet R. Maybank	Succeeded to governorship
-	Vacant			until January 19, 1943			
75		Ransome Judson Williams	Democratic	January 19, 1943 – January 2, 1945	1942	Olin D. Johnston	Succeeded to governorship (Note: Succeeded to governorship when Governor Olin Johnston resigned to become a United States senator.)
-	Vacant			until January 21, 1947			
76		George Bell Timmerman, Jr.	Democratic	January 21, 1947 – January 18, 1955	1946	Strom Thurmond	
76		George Bell Timmerman, Jr.	Democratic	January 21, 1947 – January 18, 1955	1950	James F. Byrnes	
77		Fritz Hollings	Democratic	January 18, 1955 – January 20, 1959	1954	George Bell Timmerman, Jr.	
78		Burnet R. Maybank Jr.	Democratic	January 20, 1959 – January 15, 1963	1958	Fritz Hollings	
79		Robert Evander McNair	Democratic	January 15, 1963 – April 22, 1965	1962	Donald S. Russell	Succeeded to governorship (Note: Succeeded to governorship when Governor Donald Russell resigned to become a United States senator.)
-	Vacant			until January 17, 1967			
80		John C. West	Democratic	January 17, 1967 – January 19, 1971	1966	Robert Evander McNair	
81		Earle Morris, Jr.	Democratic	January 19, 1971 – January 21, 1975	1970	John C. West	
82		W. Brantley Harvey, Jr.	Democratic	January 21, 1975 – January 10, 1979	1974	James B. Edwards	
83		Nancy Stevenson	Democratic	January 10, 1979 – January 12, 1983	1978	Richard Riley	First female lieutenant governor
84		Michael R. Daniel	Democratic	January 12, 1983 – January 14, 1987	1982	Richard Riley	
85		Nick Theodore	Democratic	January 14, 1987 – January 11, 1995	1986	Carroll A. Campbell, Jr.	
85		Nick Theodore	Democratic	January 14, 1987 – January 11, 1995	1990	Carroll A. Campbell, Jr.	
86		Bob Peeler	Republican	January 11, 1995 – January 15, 2003	1994	David Beasley	
86		Bob Peeler	Republican	January 11, 1995 – January 15, 2003	1998	Jim Hodges	
87		André Bauer	Republican	January 15, 2003 – January 12, 2011	2002	Mark Sanford	
87		André Bauer	Republican	January 15, 2003 – January 12, 2011	2006	Mark Sanford	
88		Ken Ard	Republican	January 12, 2011 – March 9, 2012	2010	Nikki Haley	Resigned (Note: Resigned after the South Carolina ethics commission charged him with 69 counts of using campaign money for personal use and 23 counts of failing to disclose campaign expenses during the 2010 election for lieutenant governor.)
-	Vacant			until March 13, 2012	2010	Nikki Haley	
89		Glenn F. McConnell	Republican	March 13, 2012 – June 18, 2014	2010	Nikki Haley	Resigned (Note: Resigned to become the president of the College of Charleston.)
90		Yancey McGill	Democratic	June 18, 2014 – January 14, 2015	2010	Nikki Haley	
91		Henry McMaster	Republican	January 14, 2015 – January 24, 2017	2014	Nikki Haley	Succeeded to governorship (Note: Succeeded to the governorship after Governor Nikki Haley resigned to become the United States Ambassador to the United Nations.)
-	Vacant			until January 25, 2017	2014	Nikki Haley	
92		Kevin L. Bryant	Republican	January 25, 2017 – January 9, 2019	2014	Henry McMaster	
93		Pamela Evette	Republican	January 9, 2019 – Present	2018	Henry McMaster	First elected on same ticket as governor
93		Pamela Evette	Republican	January 9, 2019 – Present	2022	Henry McMaster	First elected on same ticket as governor

== See also ==
- Lieutenant Governor of South Carolina
- Governor of South Carolina
- List of governors of South Carolina
