= List of South Carolina gubernatorial elections =

Prior to 1865, the Governor of South Carolina was chosen by the General Assembly. The Constitution of South Carolina provided for the voters of South Carolina to choose the governor; James Lawrence Orr was the first elected governor of South Carolina. The following is a list of gubernatorial election results for the state of South Carolina:

== Results ==
| Year | Winner | Minority | County Map |
|---|---|---|---|
| 1865 | James Lawrence Orr; No party 9,928; 51.9% | Wade Hampton III; No party 9,186; 48.1% | Gray counties were won by Orr and green counties were won by Hampton |
| 1868 | Robert Kingston Scott; Republican; 69,693; 75.1% | William Dennison Porter; Democrat; 23,057; 24.9% | Red counties were won by Scott and blue counties were won by Porter |
| 1870 | Robert Kingston Scott; Republican; 85,071; 62.3% | Richard B. Carpenter; Union Reform; 51,537; 37.7% | Red counties were won by Scott and magenta counties were won by Carpenter |
| 1872 | Franklin J. Moses, Jr. Republican; 69,838; 65.4% | Reuben Tomlinson; Independent Republican; 36,533; 34.3% | Red counties were won by Moses and magenta counties were won by Tomlinson |
| 1874 | Daniel Henry Chamberlain; Republican; 80,403; 53.9% | John T. Green; Independent Republican; 68,818; 46.1% | Red counties were won by Chamberlain and magenta counties were won by Green |
| 1876 | Wade Hampton III; Democrat; 92,261; 50.3% | Daniel Henry Chamberlain; Republican; 91,127; 49.7% | Blue counties were won by Hampton and red counties were won by Chamberlain |
| 1878 | Wade Hampton III; Democrat; 119,550; 99.8% | Unopposed | Blue counties were won by Hampton |
| 1880 | Johnson Hagood; Democrat; 117,432; 96.4% | L.W.R. Blair; Greenback-Labor; 4,277; 3.5% | Blue counties were won by Hagood |
| 1882 | Hugh Smith Thompson; Democrat; 67,158; 79.0% | J. Hendrix McLane; Greenback-Labor; 17,719; 20.8% | Blue counties were won by Thompson and green counties were won by McLane |
| 1884 | Hugh Smith Thompson; Democrat; 67,895; 100% | Unopposed | Blue counties were won by Thompson |
| 1886 | John Peter Richardson III; Democrat; 33,114; 99.9% | Unopposed | Blue counties were won by Richardson |
| 1888 | John Peter Richardson III; Democrat; 58,730; 100% | Unopposed | Blue counties were won by Richardson |
| 1890 | Ben Tillman; Democrat; 59,159; 79.8% | Alexander Cheves Haskell; Straightout Democrat; 14,828; 20.0% | Blue counties were won by Tillman and cyan counties were won by Haskell |
| 1892 | Ben Tillman; Democrat; 56,673; 99.9% | Unopposed | Blue counties were won by Tillman |
| 1894 | John Gary Evans; Democrat; 39,507; 69.6% | Sampson Pope; Independent; 17,278; 30.4% | Blue counties were won by Evans and magenta counties were won by Pope |
| 1896 | William Haselden Ellerbe; Democrat; 59,424; 89.1% | Sampson Pope; Reorganized Republican; 4,432; 6.6% | Blue counties were won by Ellerbe |
| 1898 | William Haselden Ellerbe; Democrat; 28,225; 100% | Unopposed | |
| 1900 | Miles Benjamin McSweeney; Democrat; 46,457; 100% | Unopposed | |
| 1902 | Duncan Clinch Heyward; Democrat; 31,817; 100% | Unopposed | |
| 1904 | Duncan Clinch Heyward; Democrat; 51,917; 100% | Unopposed | Blue counties were won by Heyward |
| 1906 | Martin Frederick Ansel; Democrat; 30,251; 100% | Unopposed | Blue counties were won by Ansel |
| 1908 | Martin Frederick Ansel; Democrat; 61,060; 100% | Unopposed | |
| 1910 | Coleman Livingston Blease; Democrat; 30,739; 100% | Unopposed | |
| 1912 | Coleman Livingston Blease; Democrat; 44,122; 99.5% | R.B. Britton; Socialist; 208; 0.5% | |
| 1914 | Richard Irvine Manning III; Democrat; 34,606; 99.8% | R.B. Britton; Socialist; 83; 0.2% | |
| 1916 | Richard Irvine Manning III; Democrat; 60,405; 97.9% | Coleman Livingston Blease; Independent; 1,089; 1.8% | |
| 1918 | Robert Archer Cooper; Democrat; 25,267; 100% | Unopposed | |
| 1920 | Robert Archer Cooper; Democrat; 58,050; 100% | Unopposed | |
| 1922 | Thomas Gordon McLeod; Democrat; 34,065; 100% | Unopposed | |
| 1924 | Thomas Gordon McLeod; Democrat; 53,545; 100% | Unopposed | |
| 1926 | John Gardiner Richards, Jr. Democrat; 16,589; 100% | Unopposed | |
| 1930 | Ibra Charles Blackwood; Democrat; 17,790; 100% | Unopposed | |
| 1934 | Olin D. Johnston; Democrat; 22,873; 100% | Unopposed | |
| 1938 | Burnet Rhett Maybank; Democrat; 49,009; 99.4% | Joseph Augustis Tolbert; Republican; 283; 0.6% | |
| 1942 | Olin D. Johnston; Democrat; 23,859; 100% | Unopposed | |
| 1946 | Strom Thurmond; Democrat; 26,520; 100% | Unopposed | |
| 1950 | James F. Byrnes; Democrat; 50,633; 100% | Unopposed | |
| 1954 | George Bell Timmerman, Jr. Democrat; 214,204; 100% | Unopposed | |
| 1958 | Ernest Hollings; Democrat; 77,714; 100% | Unopposed | |
| 1962 | Donald Stuart Russell; Democrat; 253,704; 100% | Unopposed | |
| 1966 | Robert Evander McNair; Democrat; 255,854; 58.2% | Joseph O. Rogers, Jr. Republican; 184,088; 41.8% | Blue counties were won by McNair and red counties were won by Rogers |
| 1970 | John Carl West; Democrat; 251,151; 52.1% | Albert Watson; Republican; 221,236; 45.9% | Blue counties were won by West and red counties were won by Watson |
| 1974 | James Burrows Edwards; Republican; 266,338; 50.3% | W.J. Bryan Dorn; Democrat; 248,861; 47.0% | Red counties were won by Edwards and blue counties were won by Dorn |
| 1978 | Richard Riley; Democrat; 384,898; 61.3% | Edward Lunn Young; Republican; 236,946; 37.7% | Blue counties were won by Riley and red counties were won by Young |
| 1982 | Richard Riley; Democrat; 468,787; 69.8% | W. D. Workman Jr. Republican; 202,806; 30.2% | Blue counties were won by Riley |
| 1986 | Carroll A. Campbell, Jr. Republican; 384,565; 51.0% | Michael R. Daniel; Democrat; 361,328; 47.9% | Red counties were won by Campbell and blue counties were won by Daniel |
| 1990 | Carroll A. Campbell, Jr. Republican; 528,831; 69.5% | Theo Mitchell; Democrat; 212,048; 27.8% | Red counties were won by Campbell and blue counties were won by Mitchell |
| 1994 | David Beasley; Republican; 470,756; 50.4% | Nick Theodore; Democrat; 447,002; 47.9% | Red counties were won by Beasley and blue counties were won by Theodore |
| 1998 | Jim Hodges; Democrat; 570,070; 53.3% | David Beasley; Republican; 484,088; 45.3% | Blue counties were won by Hodges and red counties were won by Beasley |
| 2002 | Mark Sanford; Republican; 585,422; 52.9% | Jim Hodges; Democrat; 521,140; 47.0% | Red counties were won by Sanford and blue counties were won by Hodges |
| 2006 | Mark Sanford; Republican; 601,868; 55.1% | Tommy Moore; Democrat; 489,076; 44.8% | Red counties were won by Sanford and blue counties were won by Moore |
| 2010 | Nikki Haley; Republican; 674,103; 51.4% | Vincent Sheheen; Democrat; 617,427; 47.1% | Red counties were won by Haley and blue counties were won by Sheheen |
| 2014 | Nikki Haley; Republican; 696,645; 55.9% | Vincent Sheheen; Democrat; 516,166; 41.4% | |
| 2018 | Henry McMaster; Republican; 921,324; 54.0% | James Smith; Democrat; 784,182; 45.9% | |
| 2022 | Henry McMaster; Republican; 988,501; 58.1% | Joe Cunningham; Democrat; 692,691; 40.7% | |

== Statistics ==
=== Firsts ===
- The gubernatorial election of 1865 was the first gubernatorial election of South Carolina.
- The gubernatorial election of 1896 was the first gubernatorial election that featured the use of a primary election.
- The gubernatorial election of 1898 was the first gubernatorial election that featured the use of a runoff election.

=== Votes ===
- There have been 51 gubernatorial elections in South Carolina.
- Democrats have won 40 of the 47 (85%) elections that they nominated a candidate.
- Republicans have won 10 of the 18 (56%) elections that they nominated a candidate.
- James Lawrence Orr won with the smallest margin of victory in the gubernatorial election of 1865: 743.
- The gubernatorial election of 1926 had the lowest vote: 16,589.
- The gubernatorial election of 2018 had the largest vote: 1,705,506.

=== Unique politicians ===
- Only three governors have been defeated for reelection: Daniel Henry Chamberlain in 1876, David Beasley in 1998 and Jim Hodges in 2002.
- Coleman Livingston Blease has made the most attempts for governor (8): 1906, 1908, 1910, 1912, 1916, 1922, 1934 and 1938. He was successful in 1910 and 1912.

== See also ==
- Governor of South Carolina
- List of governors of South Carolina
