= 1900 South Carolina gubernatorial election =

1900 South Carolina Democratic gubernatorial primary runoff
- September 11, 1900
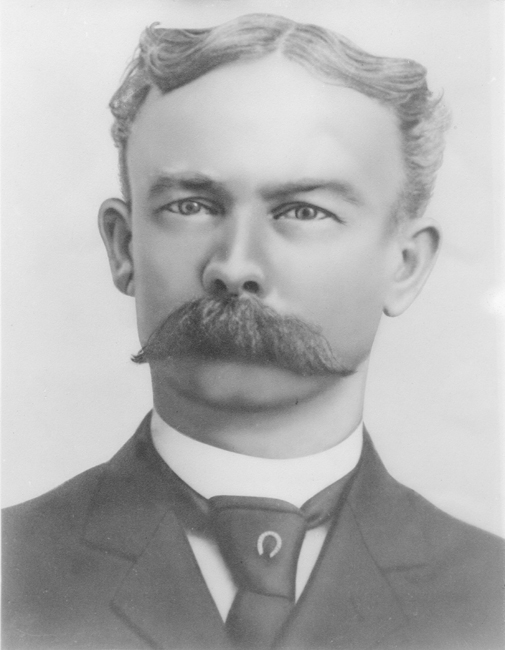

Nominee	Miles Benjamin McSweeney	James A. Hoyt
Party	Democratic	Democratic
Popular vote	51,363	37,412
Percentage	57.86%	42.14%
- County results McSweeney: 50–60% 60–70% 70–80% 80–90% Hoyt: 50–60%
Governor before election
William Haselden Ellerbe
Democratic
Elected Governor
Miles Benjamin McSweeney
Democratic

The 1900 South Carolina gubernatorial election was held on November 6, 1900 to select the governor of the state of South Carolina. Governor Miles Benjamin McSweeney won the Democratic primary and ran unopposed in the general election to win a term for governor in his own right.

== Democratic primary ==
The South Carolina Democratic Party held their primary for governor on August 28 and incumbent Governor McSweeney was the frontrunner. McSweeney favored the continuation of the state Dispensary which brought the backing of influential Senator and former Governor Ben Tillman. Prohibitionist James A. Hoyt won second place in the primary to advance to the runoff on September 11, but could not overcome McSweeney because the voters of the state simply did not want any alteration of an institution set up by Ben Tillman.

Democratic Primary
Candidate	Votes	%
Miles Benjamin McSweeney	39,097	42.3
James A. Hoyt	33,833	36.6
Frank B. Gary	12,956	14.0
A. Howard Patterson	6,052	6.6
G. Walton Whitman	491	0.6

Democratic Primary Runoff
Candidate	Votes	%	±%
Miles Benjamin McSweeney	51,363	57.9	+15.6
James A. Hoyt	37,412	42.1	+5.5

== General election ==
The general election was held on November 6, 1900 and Miles Benjamin McSweeney was elected to a second term as governor of South Carolina without opposition. Turnout greatly increased over the previous gubernatorial election because there was also a presidential election on the ballot.

South Carolina Gubernatorial Election, 1900
Party	Candidate	Votes	%	±%
Democratic	Miles Benjamin McSweeney (incumbent)	46,457	99.96	0.0
No party	Write-Ins	18	0.04	0.0
Majority		46,439	99.92	0.0
Turnout		46,475		
Democratic hold				

65+% won by McSweeney

== See also ==
- Governor of South Carolina
- List of governors of South Carolina
- South Carolina gubernatorial elections

Preceded by 1898	South Carolina gubernatorial elections	Succeeded by 1902
