= 1896 South Carolina gubernatorial election =

- November 3, 1896
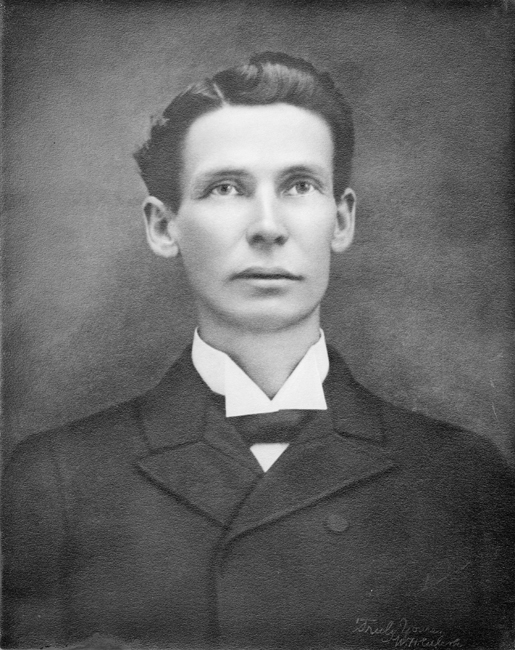

Nominee	William Haselden Ellerbe	Sampson Pope
Party	Democratic	Reorganized Republican
Popular vote	59,424	4,432
Percentage	89.12%	6.65%
- County results Ellerbe: 50–60% 70–80% 80–90% >90%

The 1896 South Carolina gubernatorial election was held on November 3, 1896, to select the governor of the state of South Carolina. William Haselden Ellerbe won the Democratic primary and easily won the general election to become the 86th governor of South Carolina.

== Democratic primary ==
A new South Carolina Constitution was promulgated in 1895 under the direction of Pitchfork Ben Tillman and it disenfranchised the remaining blacks who were eligible to vote. With the removal of blacks from the electorate, the South Carolina Democratic Party felt safe to have its statewide ticket selected from a primary election. Thus, the 1896 election in South Carolina was the first that featured the use of a primary election by a party to select its nominees of statewide office for the general election.

Governor John Gary Evans declined to seek a second term and instead sought election to the U.S. Senate. Three candidates entered the Democratic primary and William Haselden Ellerbe from the start was the heavy favorite to win. He had been a candidate in the previous gubernatorial election, but lost to Evans after Tillman shifted his support from Ellerbe to Evans. This time Tillman fully backed Ellerbe and the other candidates never generated any traction with the voters of the state. The primary was held on August 26 and Ellerbe coasted to victory while the voters were chiefly interested in the battle between Evans and Joseph H. Earle for the open Senate seat.

Democratic Primary
Candidate	Votes	%
William Haselden Ellerbe	55,313	77.1
John R. Harrison	14,278	19.9
G. Walton Whitman	2,186	3.0

== Republican split ==
Sampson Pope had been an independent candidate in the previous gubernatorial election and gained an impressive 30% of the vote in a state completely run by the Democratic party machine. Upset at the new state constitution promulgated in 1895 and the lack of opposition by the state Republicans, Pope established a new party called the "Reorganized Republicans". It was composed chiefly of white men and requested recognition as the official South Carolina Republican Party from the Republican National Committee. Pope was considered to be a lily-white Republican.

However, the official state party did not want to lose its official status because of the potential spoils system to be gained by the election of William McKinley for president in 1896. They called for a state convention on September 17 in Columbia to nominate a statewide ticket. Sampson Pope likewise called for a convention of his Reorganized Republicans at the same time hoping that the two factions would merge or fuse for the general election. The old guard Republicans refused any merger and would only accept complete subordination forcing the Reorganized Republicans to also nominate a slate of statewide candidates.

== General election ==
The general election was held on November 3, 1896, and William Haselden Ellerbe was easily elected as governor of South Carolina against the two Republican candidates. Turnout increased for this election over the previous election because it was a contested election and there also was a presidential election on the ballot.

South Carolina Gubernatorial Election, 1896
Party	Candidate	Votes	%	±%
Democratic	William Haselden Ellerbe (incumbent)	59,424	89.12	+19.5
Reorganized Republican	Sampson Pope	4,432	6.65	-23.8
Republican	R.M. Wallace	2,780	4.17	+4.2
No party	Write-Ins	41	0.06	+0.1
Majority		54,992	82.48	+43.3
Turnout		66,677		
Democratic hold				

== See also ==
- Governor of South Carolina
- List of governors of South Carolina
- South Carolina gubernatorial elections

== Sources ==
Preceded by 1894	South Carolina gubernatorial elections	Succeeded by 1898
