= 1894 South Carolina gubernatorial election =

- November 6, 1894
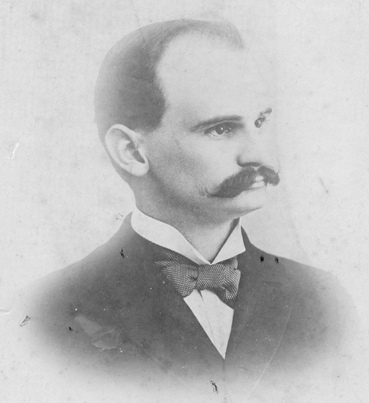

Nominee	John Gary Evans	Sampson Pope
Party	Democratic	Independent
Alliance	-	Republican
Popular vote	39,507	17,278
Percentage	69.57%	30.43%
- County results Evans: 50–60% 60–70% 70–80% 80–90% Pope: 50–60% 60–70% 70–80%
Governor before election
Ben Tillman
Democratic
Elected Governor
John Gary Evans
Democratic

The 1894 South Carolina gubernatorial election was held on November 6, 1894 to select the governor of the state of South Carolina. John Gary Evans was nominated by the Democrats and became the 85th governor of South Carolina.

== Democratic campaign ==
The conservatives had been so thoroughly defeated by Ben Tillman in 1890 and 1892 that they did not offer a candidate for the gubernatorial election. Instead, it became a contest between four Tillmanites: William Ellerbe, John Gary Evans, Dr. Sampson Pope and J.E. Tindal. All four claimed to be the candidate favored by Tillman, but an embarrassed Tillman responded, "They ought to be spanked for quarrelling about who is the closest friend of Tillman." Initially, Tillman privately supported Ellerbe because he was a farmer, but Tillman became more attracted to Evans as he proved to be a better orator during the campaign. Evans also was able to woo Senator Irby to his side, who placed the Tillman machine squarely behind his candidacy.

Ellerbe, Pope and Tindall sensed that they would be unable to win any of the delegates for their candidacy at the Democratic convention and therefore requested a primary election to select the statewide ticket. Tillman refused this request and Evans was unanimously selected as the Democratic gubernatorial candidate at the Democratic convention in Columbia on September 1.

== General election ==
Sampson Pope denounced the selection of Evans as the Democratic candidate by declaring it ring rule because the state Democratic party was completely run by Tillman and his cronies. He entered the general election as an independent candidate, but the Tillmanites used the quote uttered by Wade Hampton that "an independent was worse than a Radical" to great effect and Pope's campaign was nothing more than a protest vote.

The general election was held on November 6, 1894 and John Gary Evans was easily elected as governor of South Carolina against Sampson Pope. Turnout increased for this election over the previous election because it was a contested election, but only by just over 100 votes.

South Carolina Gubernatorial Election, 1894
Party	Candidate	Votes	%	±%
Democratic	John Gary Evans	39,507	69.57	−30.4
Independent	Sampson Pope	17,278	30.43	+30.4
Majority		22,229	39.14	−60.8
Turnout		56,785		
Democratic hold				

== See also ==
- Governor of South Carolina
- List of governors of South Carolina
- South Carolina gubernatorial elections

== Notes ==
Preceded by 1892	South Carolina gubernatorial elections	Succeeded by 1896
