= William Dennison Porter =

American politician (1810–1883)

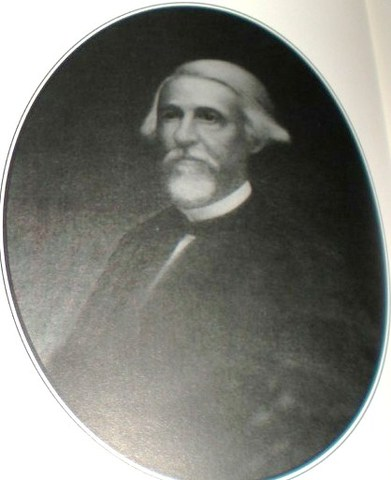

52nd Lieutenant Governor of South Carolina
- In office November 30, 1865 – July 6, 1868
- Governor: James Lawrence Orr
- Preceded by: Robert McCaw
- Succeeded by: Lemuel Boozer

Personal details
- Born: November 24, 1810 Charleston, South Carolina, U.S.
- Died: January 4, 1883 (aged 72) Charleston, South Carolina, U.S.
- Party: Democratic

William Dennison Porter (November 24, 1810 – January 4, 1883) was an American lawyer and politician who served as the 52nd lieutenant governor of South Carolina. Earlier in his political career he served in the South Carolina House of Representatives and South Carolina Senate. A Democrat, he supported slavery and succession. He opposed voting rights for African Americans after the Civil War.

== Career ==
Porter was elected to the South Carolina House of Representatives where he served from 1840 to 1848, and later the South Carolina Senate from 1848 to 1865 until the body was deposed by the Union Army during the American Civil War. Prior to the Civil War, Porter argued that states had the right to secede from the Union. Porter was an advocate of slavery, citing in an 1860 letter, "[slavery is] an institution ordained by the Creator and recognized by His law; that feeds and clothes the world; that gives to the barbarian a knowledge of God." In the same letter, he argued that Southern states maintained the right to secede because the United States sought to abolish slavery.

After the Civil War in 1865, Porter because the first popularly-elected lieutenant governor in South Carolina; his predecessors were chosen by the General Assembly. Porter served one term of 2.5 years until a new constitution was ratified.

Porter was nominated for governor by the Democratic Party, but he declined. Porter was opposed to the constitution of 1868, which provided for popular elections, claiming that it provided for "Negro supremacy." After leaving office, Porter served as attorney for the city of Charleston, South Carolina. In November 1868, he argued a case before the South Carolina Supreme Court in which voter fraud had been alleged.

Porter died in Charleston in 1883.
