= 1958 South Carolina gubernatorial election =

1958 South Carolina Democratic gubernatorial primary runoff
- November 4, 1958
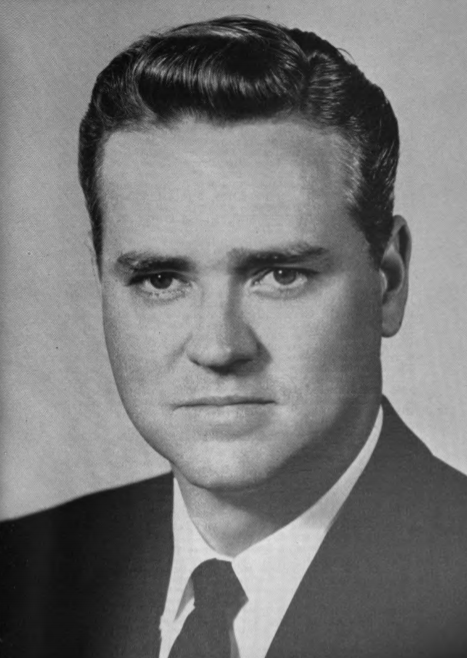

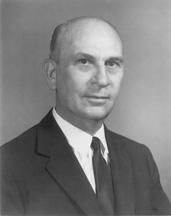
Nominee	Fritz Hollings	Donald S. Russell
Party	Democratic	Democratic
Popular vote	190,691	145,162
Percentage	56.78%	43.22%
- County results Hollings: 50–60% 60–70% 70–80% 80–90% Russell: 50–60%
Governor before election
George Timmerman
Democratic
Elected Governor
Fritz Hollings
Democratic

The 1958 South Carolina gubernatorial election was held on November 4, 1958 to select the governor of the state of South Carolina. Ernest Hollings won the Democratic primary against rival Donald S. Russell and ran unopposed in the general election becoming the 106th governor.

== Democratic primary ==
=== Candidates ===
- Fritz Hollings, Lieutenant Governor of South Carolina and former State Representative from Charleston, later elected to the US Senate in 1966.
- William C. Johnston
- Donald S. Russell, former President of the University of South Carolina and Assistant United States Secretary of State for Administration

The South Carolina Democratic Party held their primary for governor in the summer of 1958 and it became a heated contest between Lieutenant Governor Ernest Hollings and the former president of the University of South Carolina, Donald S. Russell. Hollings emerged victorious from the runoff and effectively became the next governor of South Carolina because there was no opposition in the general election.

Democratic Primary
Candidate	Votes	%
Ernest Hollings	158,159	41.9
Donald S. Russell	132,099	35.0
William C. Johnston	86,981	23.1

=== Results ===
Democratic Primary Runoff
Candidate	Votes	%	±%
Ernest Hollings	190,691	56.8	+14.9
Donald S. Russell	145,162	43.2	+8.2

== General election ==
The general election was held on November 4, 1958 and Ernest Hollings was elected the next governor of South Carolina without opposition. Being a non-presidential election and few contested races, turnout was much lower than the Democratic primary election.

South Carolina Gubernatorial Election, 1958
Party	Candidate	Votes	%	±%
Democratic	Ernest Hollings	77,714	99.97	0.0
No party	Write-Ins	26	0.03	0.0
Majority		77,688	99.94	0.0
Turnout		77,740	14.5	
Democratic hold				

== See also ==
- Governor of South Carolina
- List of governors of South Carolina
- South Carolina gubernatorial elections

Preceded by 1954	South Carolina gubernatorial elections	Succeeded by 1962
