= Disputed government of South Carolina of 1876–1877 =

Dispute: December 6, 1876 – April 11, 1877
Claim	Claim
Daniel H. Chamberlain	Wade Hampton III
Republican	Democratic
91,127 votes	92,261 votes
Claim: Democrats' voter fraud	Claim: Won majority of votes
Outcome: Resigned	Outcome: Declared sole governor

From December 1876 to April 1877, the Republican and Democratic parties in South Carolina each claimed to be the legitimate government. Both parties declared that the other had lost the election and that they controlled the governorship, the state legislature, and most state offices. Each government debated and passed laws, raised militias, collected taxes, and conducted other business as if the other did not exist. After four months of contested government, Daniel Henry Chamberlain, who claimed the governorship as a Republican, conceded to Democrat Wade Hampton III on April 11, 1877. This came after President Rutherford Hayes withdrew federal troops from the South.

== Background ==
Before the Civil War and until the Great Migration in the early twentieth century, African Americans outnumbered whites in South Carolina. According to the official U.S. Census of 1870, there were 705,606 people living in South Carolina, 465,814 (58.9%) of whom were African Americans. Furthermore, the majority of African Americans who voted during the Reconstruction era voted for the Republican Party. In the mid-1870s, the Democratic Party in South Carolina attempted to return the state to its antebellum status by electing former Confederates to political office and preventing African Americans from voting through the Black Codes, literacy tests, poll taxes, and intimidation. The emergence of these white supremacist governments was referred to by white Southerners as the "Redeemer governments" or "saviors of the South." In the late 19th century, Democrats in South Carolina used aggressive tactics to gain political power, including breaking up Republican meetings and intimidating Republican voters. This included the involvement of groups such as the Ku Klux Klan and the Red Shirts, particularly in 1875 and 1876, resulting in a reign of terror against African Americans and Republicans. In response, President Ulysses S. Grant sent federal troops into the state to protect these groups.

In 1876, the Democratic Party nominated Wade Hampton III, a former Confederate lieutenant general, to run for governor. Hampton was born into the wealthy and respected Hampton family of Charleston, and his family made millions from the use of slave labor on cotton plantations. South Carolina's incumbent Republican governor, Daniel Henry Chamberlain, a Massachusetts-born lawyer, was running for re-election against Hampton. Hampton and white Democrats sought to remove the "Radical Republicans" from office and establish an unopposed Democratic ticket. On election day, the vote count indicated that Wade Hampton III had won the election. However, allegations of voter fraud immediately arose, and some Democrats later admitted to allowing Georgians to vote, intentionally not counting or prohibiting African American voters from voting, and allowing some individuals to vote multiple times.

=== Results of the election of 1876 ===
Immediately after the results were announced, both the Republican and Democratic parties accused each other of fraud. Hampton received 92,261 votes to Chamberlain's 91,127. However, the State Board of Canvassers, (Note: A board established to certify election results.) which was composed of five Republicans, declared that the elections in Edgefield County and Laurens County were so tainted by fraud that their results would be excluded from the final tally. This changed the Republican tally from a 1,134-vote loss to a 3,145-vote victory. Both parties claimed the governorship, the General Assembly, and most state offices.

1876 Election Results
	Chamberlain	Hampton
Actual votes counted	91,127	92,261
Board of Canvassers count	86,216	83,078

Both the Republican and Democratic parties refused to acknowledge that the other party had won the election. The Democrats claimed that they had won the majority of votes and were therefore the legitimate government. The Republicans, on the other hand, claimed that the Democrats had committed voter fraud through intimidation of African Americans, black codes, ballot stuffing, and by having more votes cast than registered voters. The Republican Party issued a statement saying "that if the canvass (Note: Polling and voting locations.) in the State had been free from violence and fraud the Republican majority would have been sufficient [to elect] all the candidates [from the Republican Party.]"

== Dual government ==
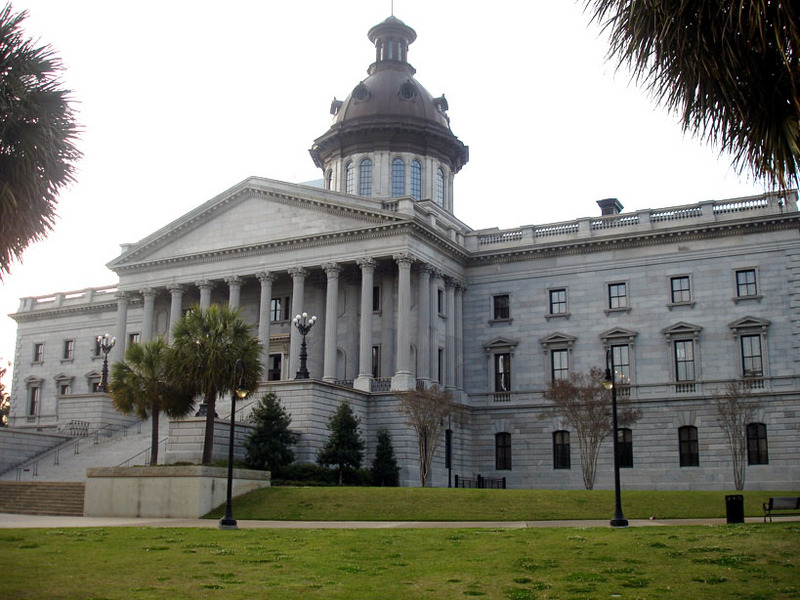
SC Statehouse

Both Chamberlain and Hampton refused to accept the other's claim to the governorship. As the incumbent governor, Chamberlain secretly ordered troops to occupy the South Carolina Statehouse on November 27 to prevent the Democrats from taking control. The next morning, the Democrats established their government in the Choral Union Hall instead of entering the Statehouse to avoid a confrontation. The next day, the Democrats, led by former Independent Governor James L. Orr, marched on the Statehouse. This time, when Republican lawmakers noticed the Democrats entering, they rushed into the House chamber. William Wallace, who had been elected Speaker of the House by the Democratic legislature, and E.W.M. Mackey, who had been elected Speaker by the Republican legislature, fought for possession of the Speaker's chair. For four days, members of both the Republican and Democratic parties occupied the chamber and conducted business, including debating bills, passing laws, and recognizing speakers. On December 4, Chamberlain threatened to use military force to remove the Democratic legislators, causing them to leave the chamber to avoid possible violence.

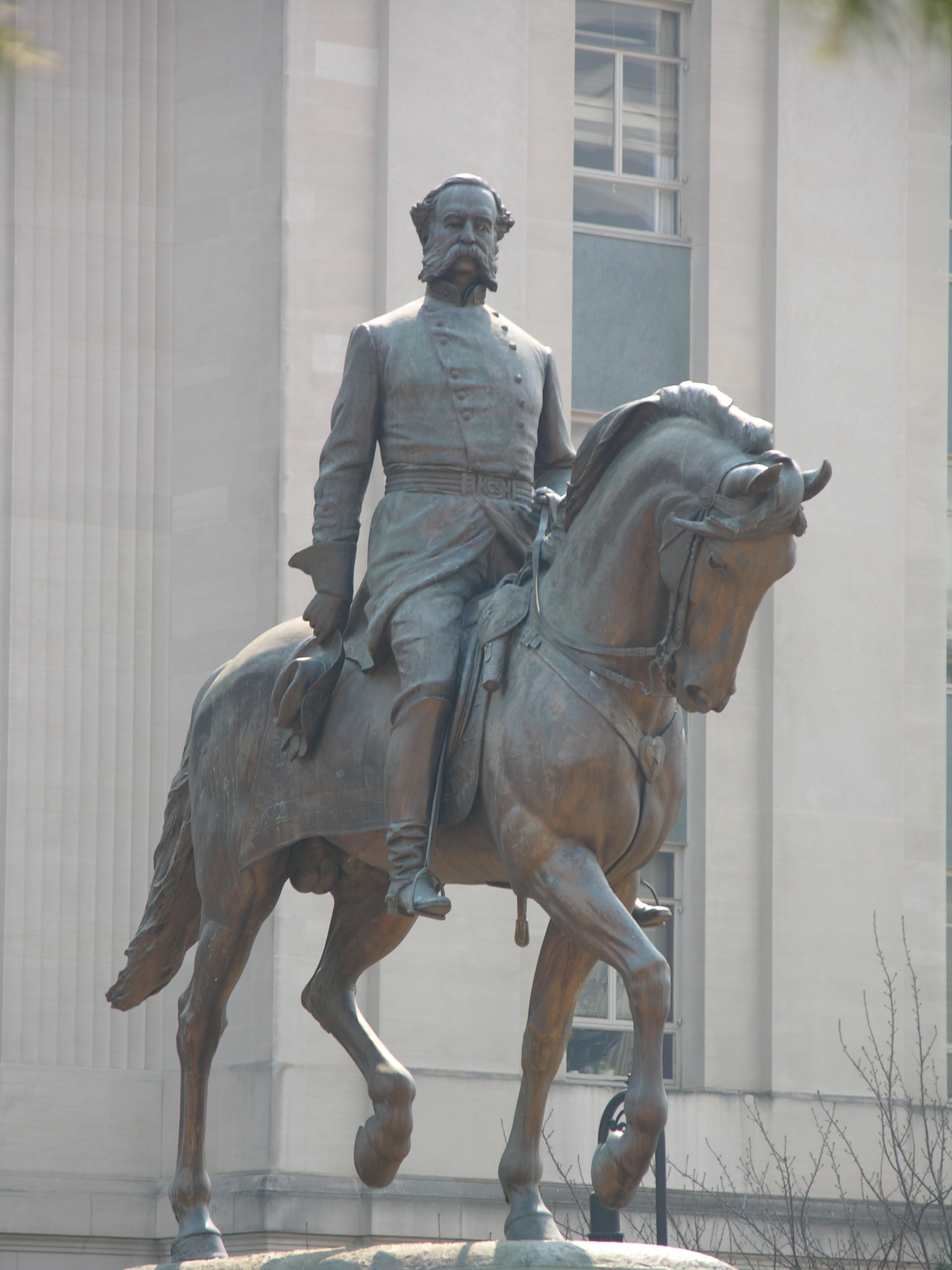
Statue of Wade Hampton (lawn of the South Carolina Statehouse)

A provision in the South Carolina Constitution of 1868 required the General Assembly to elect the governor in the event of a disputed election. On December 6, the Republican General Assembly, claiming a majority because the votes of Edgefield and Laurens counties had been excluded, elected Chamberlain to a second term. He began his new term the following day, declaring in his inaugural address, "I regard the present hour in South Carolina as a crisis at which no patriotic citizen should shrink from any post to which public duty may call him. If we fail now our Government the Government of South Carolina will no longer rest up on the consent of the governed."

In December 1876, some Democrats in the General Assembly declared themselves a quorum, even though some of their offices had been declared vacant due to allegations of election fraud. They claimed to be the legitimate government and elected Hampton governor. Their inauguration was held at Carolina Hall, now the Longstreet Theatre, instead of the Statehouse. From December 1876 to April 1877, the Republican and Democratic factions conducted business as if the other did not exist. Historian Ronald F. King argues that neither faction had legitimacy, although they continued to debate and pass legislation. On December 6, the South Carolina Supreme Court ruled that the Democratic legislature was the legitimate government. Federal troops, however, remained loyal to Chamberlain and the Republican government and continued to bar Democrats from the statehouse.

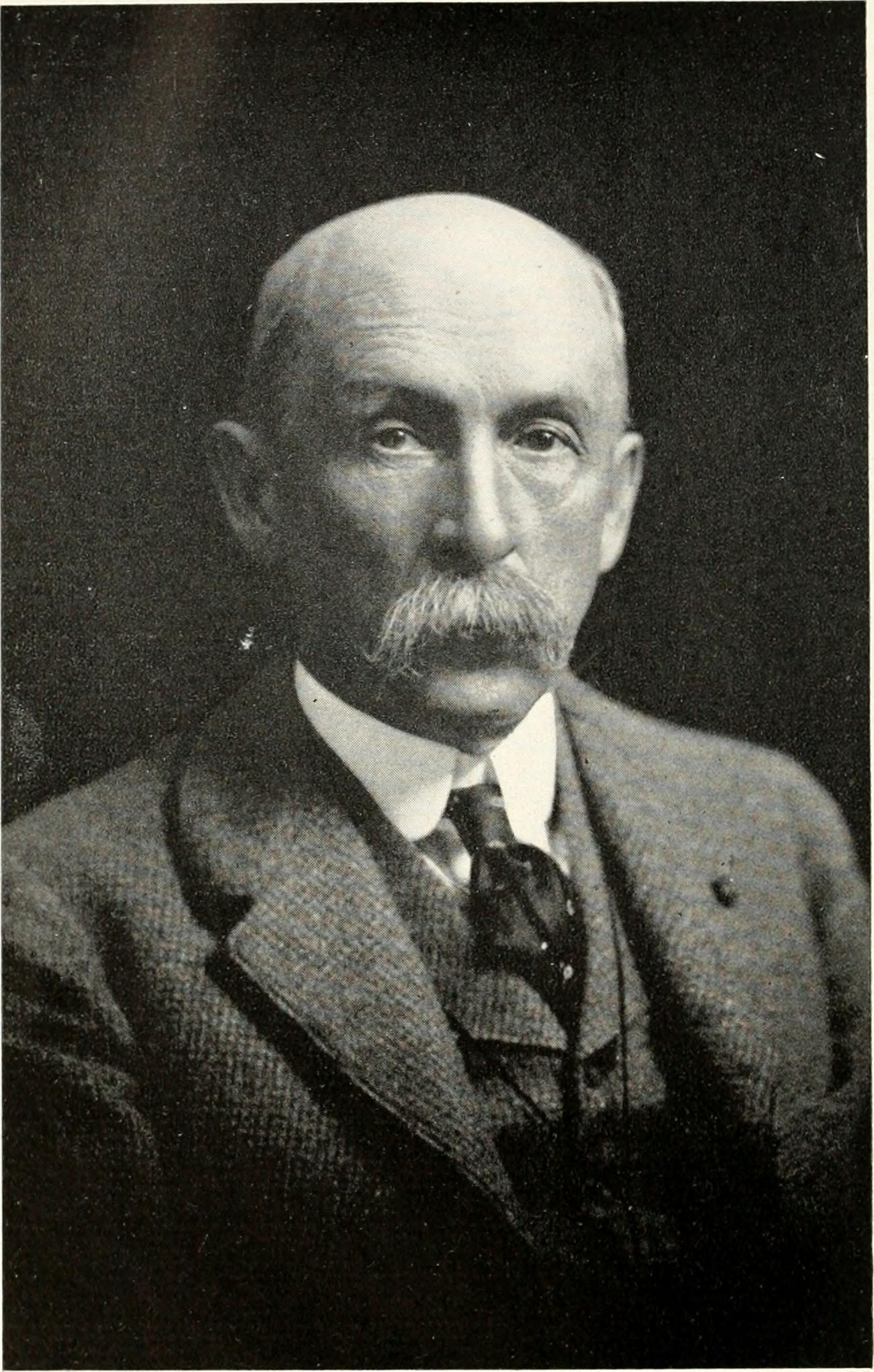
Governor Chamberlain

Hampton asked South Carolinians to refuse to pay taxes to the Chamberlain government. To support the Hampton government, each taxpayer was asked to pay only 10% of the previous year's tax bill. Both white and black South Carolinians paid taxes to the Hampton government and refused to pay taxes to the Chamberlain government, thereby denying the Chamberlain government its last legitimacy and authority apart from the U.S. Army.

Tensions increased when it was announced that Rutherford B. Hayes, a Republican, had won the 1876 presidential election in South Carolina, while Hampton, a Democrat, had won the gubernatorial race. Hampton proceeded to appoint judges, commission militia units, and issue executive orders. On December 20, Governor Chamberlain pardoned Peter Smith from the state penitentiary. However, the state supreme court ruled that the pardon was invalid because Chamberlain was not the legitimate governor. On February 9, 1877, Governor Hampton pardoned Tilda Norris. However, the warden of the state penitentiary refused to release her because he did not recognize Hampton as governor. The state supreme court sided with Hampton and forced the release of Tilda Norris.

=== Federal involvement ===
In December 1876, Senator John Brown Gordon of Georgia introduced a resolution in the U.S. Senate declaring that Wade Hampton III was the rightful governor of South Carolina. However, in January 1877, Senator John J. Patterson, a Republican from South Carolina, responded to Senator Gordon's resolution by filing papers declaring that Governor Chamberlain was the legally elected governor.

=== Meeting with President Hayes ===
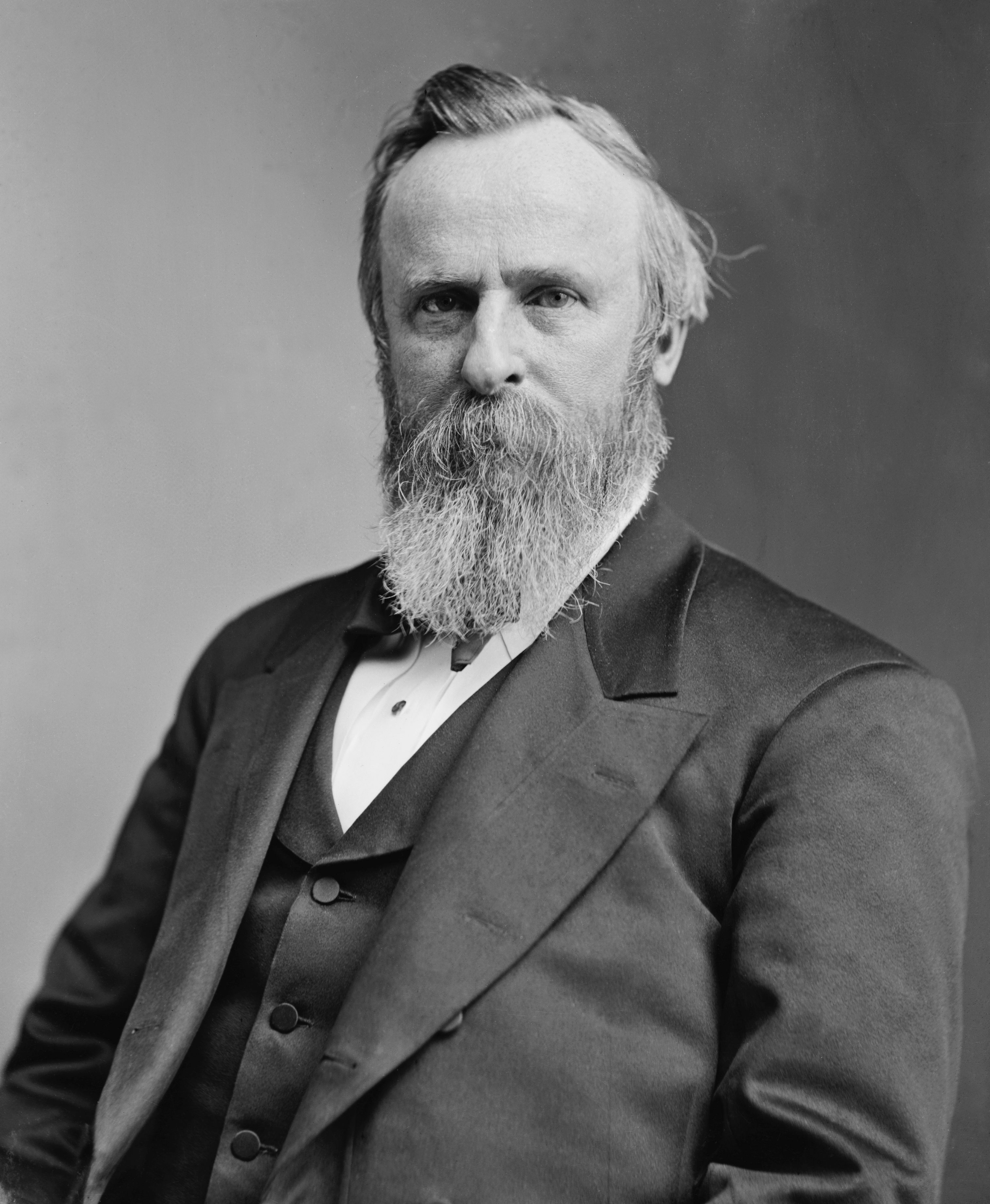
President Rutherford Hayes 1870–1880

On March 31, 1877, Chamberlain and Hampton traveled to Washington, D.C., to meet with the newly elected Republican president, Rutherford Hayes. Both men made their cases to be governor. Hayes had narrowly won his election by one electoral vote and had been accused of voter fraud. Once elected, Hayes adopted a "hands-off" policy toward the South as part of the Compromise of 1877. Hayes did not believe that the use of federal troops to decide a local election was justified. Hayes informed the two governors of his plan to withdraw federal troops from the South, which he did on April 3. The Republican administration under Chamberlain struggled to maintain power due to lack of support and was at a disadvantage to the Democratic administration under Hampton. The imposition of the Black Codes and other voter restrictions on African Americans led to a rapid loss of electoral support for the Republicans.

=== Chamberlain's concession ===
On April 10, federal troops withdrew from the Statehouse. Governor Chamberlain, realizing that he could not continue in his role without the support of federal troops, resigned on April 11. After conceding the governorship to Hampton, Chamberlain stated, "If a majority of people in a State are unable by physical force to maintain their rights, they must be left to political servitude." After Chamberlain's concession, Hampton was declared the sole governor of South Carolina. Chamberlain fled the state and resumed his law practice. Hampton was re-elected in 1878. However, he resigned in February 1879 to succeed Republican John J. Patterson as United States Senator from South Carolina. South Carolina would not elect another Republican governor until 1974, nearly 100 years later. The Democratic Party controlled the General Assembly until the 1990s. Until the 1970s, the Democratic Party faced little opposition in most gubernatorial elections and often ran unopposed.

== See also ==
- History of South Carolina
- 1876 South Carolina gubernatorial election
- 1876 United States presidential election
- African Americans in South Carolina
- Compromise of 1877
- List of governors of South Carolina
