= Frank Ellerbe =

American baseball player and politician (1895–1988)

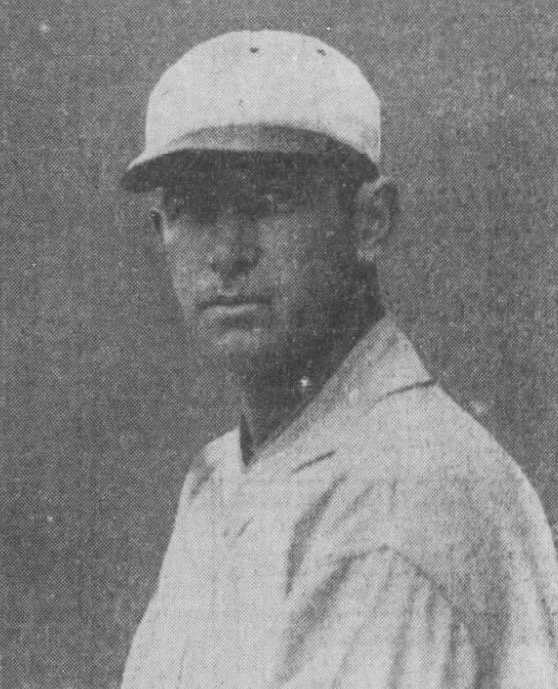
- Ellerbe in 1925
- Third baseman
- Born: Francis Rogers Ellerbe; December 25, 1895; Marion County, South Carolina, US
- Died: July 8, 1988 (aged 92); Latta, South Carolina, US
- Batted: Right Threw: Right

MLB debut
- August 28, 1919, for the Washington Senators

Last MLB appearance
- September 27, 1924, for the Cleveland Indians

MLB statistics
- Batting average: .268
- Home runs: 4
- Runs batted in: 152
- Stats at Baseball Reference

Teams
- Washington Senators (1919–1921); St. Louis Browns (1921–1924); Cleveland Indians (1924)

Francis "Governor" Rogers Ellerbe Sr. (December 25, 1895 – July 8, 1988) was an American baseball player and politician. He played for the Washington Senators, the St. Louis Browns and the Cleveland Indians, and was later a member of the South Carolina House of Representatives. He was also the son of Governor William Haselden Ellerbe.

== Early life and education ==
Ellerbe was born on December 25, 1895, in Marion County, South Carolina, the youngest of five children born to Governor William Haselden Ellerbe and Henrietts (née Rogers) Ellerbe. One of his siblings was politician Earle Rogers Ellerbe, his uncle was J. Edwin Ellerbe, and his cousin was James Douglass Manning. He attended Bennettsville High School, where he played football and baseball.

Ellerbe attended Sewanee: The University of the South, playing football and baseball for the Wofford Terriers. On the football team, he played quarterback, and on the baseball team, he played shortstop. While there, he received an offer from the Detroit Tigers, which he declined. He then transferred Wofford College, graduating from the latter in 1918. He served in the United States Navy Reserve during World War I, from January 1918 to January 1919.

== Baseball ==
In January 1919, Ellerbe signed to the Washington Senators as a third baseman. He played for the Senators in the 1919, 1920, and 1921 season. In June 1921, he was traded to the St. Louis Browns. He played his career best in 1921, posting a batting average of .286 and two home runs. He played with the Browns through 1922, 1923, and most of the 1924 season. He was then traded to the Cleveland Indians, where he played his final 17 games. Due to a knee injury he received in college, he was traded to the Kansas City Royals, though never signed with them. He retired from baseball after the 1924 season.

Over his career of 420 games over six seasons, Ellerbe posted a .268 batting average (389-for-1453), with 179 runs, 4 home runs, and 152 RBI. He finished his career with a .947 fielding percentage. He was nicknamed "Governor" because of his father's occupation. A newspaper described him as not being considered a superstar, but having the skill equivalent to one of a later era. Columnist Willis Johnson called him one of the smartest men in baseball, and at another point called him one of the politest men in the sport, with him refraining from the use of profanity.

== Later career and personal life ==
Following his baseball career, Ellerbe moved to Latta, South Carolina, where he worked as a tobacco and cotton farmer, as well as a businessman. In 1927 and 1928, he represented Dillon County in the South Carolina House of Representatives. He was chairman of the Selective Service System board from 1942 to 1950, during World War II.

Ellerbe was Methodist. He had two sons. He died on July 8, 1988, aged 92, in Latta. He was buried at Haselden Cemetery. In 1989, he was inducted into the Wofford College Athletics Hall of Fame.
