= 1954 South Carolina gubernatorial election =

1954 South Carolina Democratic gubernatorial primary
- Summer 1954
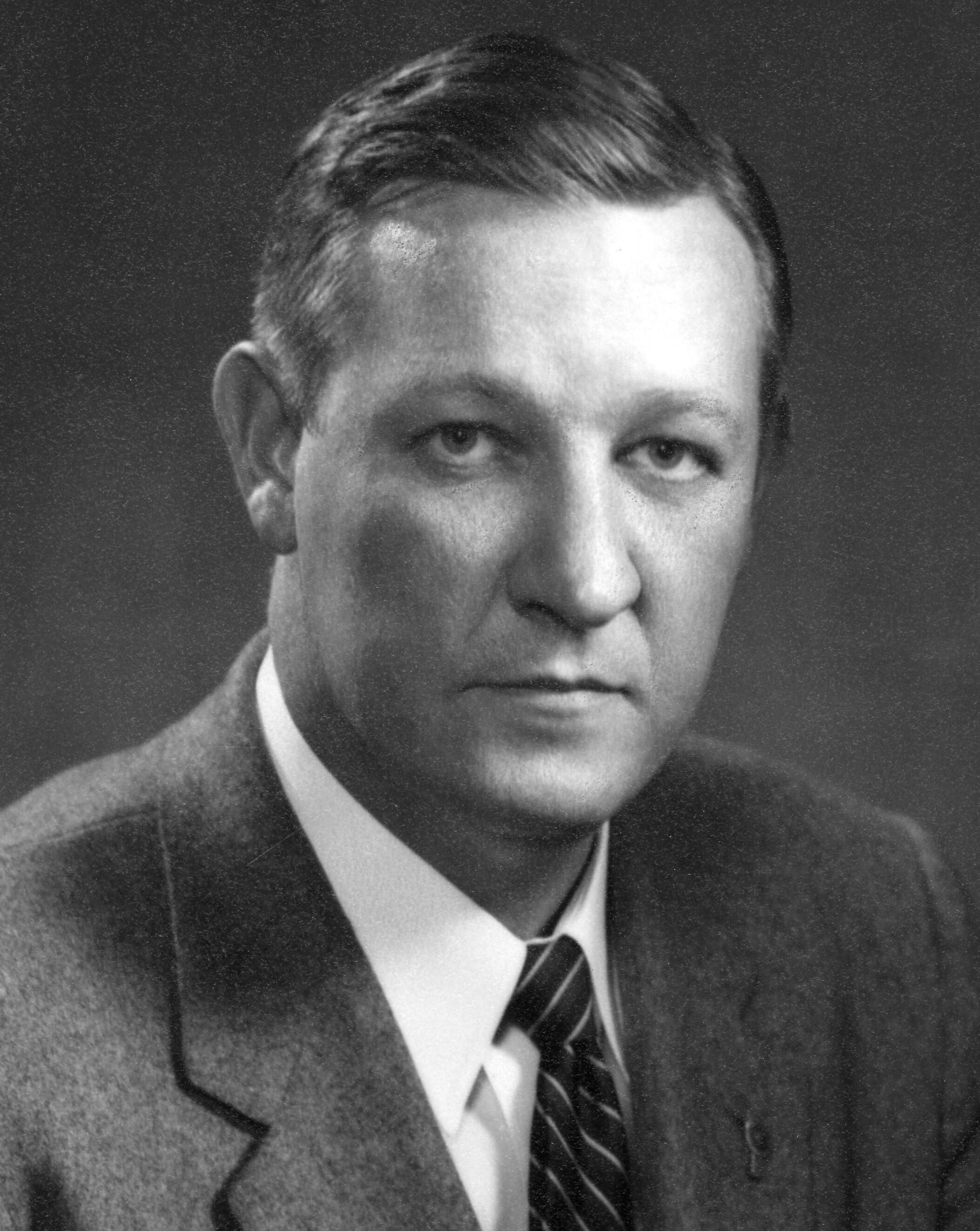

Nominee	George Timmerman	Lester L. Bates
Party	Democratic	Democratic
Popular vote	185,541	116,942
Percentage	61.34%	38.66%
- County results Timmerman: 50–60% 60–70% 70–80% 80–90% Bates: 50–60% 80–90%
Governor before election
James F. Byrnes
Democratic
Elected Governor
George Timmerman
Democratic

The 1954 South Carolina gubernatorial election was held on November 2, 1954, to select the governor of the state of South Carolina. George Bell Timmerman won the Democratic primary and ran unopposed in the general election becoming the 105th governor of South Carolina.

== Democratic primary ==
=== Candidates ===
- Lester L. Bates, Columbia insurance executive and candidate for Governor in 1950
- George Timmerman, Lieutenant Governor of South Carolina

The South Carolina Democratic Party held their primary for governor in the summer of 1954. George Bell Timmerman was the current Lieutenant Governor of South Carolina and only faced nominal opposition in the Democratic primary.

Democratic Primary
Candidate	Votes	%
George Bell Timmerman	185,541	61.3
Lester L. Bates	116,942	38.7

== General election ==
The general election was held on November 2, 1954, and George Bell Timmerman was elected the next governor of South Carolina without opposition. Turnout was much higher than the previous gubernatorial election because there was an extremely competitive Senate race on the ballot, featuring former governor Strom Thurmond.

South Carolina Gubernatorial Election, 1954
Party	Candidate	Votes	%	±%
Democratic	George Bell Timmerman	214,204	100.00	0.0
No party	Write-Ins	8	0.00	0.0
Majority		214,196	99.99	0.0
Turnout		214,212		
Democratic hold				

65+% won by Timmerman

== See also ==
- Governor of South Carolina
- List of governors of South Carolina
- South Carolina gubernatorial elections
- South Carolina United States Senate election, 1954

Preceded by 1950	South Carolina gubernatorial elections	Succeeded by 1958
