= 1962 South Carolina gubernatorial election =

1962 South Carolina Democratic gubernatorial primary
- June 12, 1962
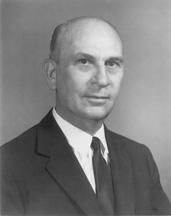

Nominee	Donald S. Russell	Burnet Maybank Jr.	Alfred W. Bethea
Party	Democratic	Democratic	Democratic
Popular vote	199,619	103,015	17,251
Percentage	60.81%	31.38%	5.25%
- County results Russell: 50–60% 60–70% 70–80% 80–90% Maybank: 50–60%
Governor before election
Ernest Hollings
Democratic
Elected Governor
Donald S. Russell
Democratic

The 1962 South Carolina gubernatorial election was held on November 6, 1962 to select the governor of the state of South Carolina. Donald S. Russell won the Democratic primary and ran unopposed in the general election becoming the 107th governor of South Carolina. It is the last uncontested South Carolina gubernatorial election.

== Democratic primary ==
=== Candidates ===
- A.W. Bethea
- Dero Cook
- Milton Dukes
- Donald S. Russell, former president of the University of South Carolina and candidate for governor in 1958
- Burnet R. Maybank Jr., lieutenant governor

The South Carolina Democratic Party held their primary for governor in the summer of 1962 and Donald S. Russell succeeded on his second attempt by easily defeating the current Lieutenant Governor and son of former governor Burnet R. Maybank. He garnered more than 50% of the vote and avoided a runoff, effectively becoming the next governor of South Carolina due to lack of opposition in the general election.

1962 South Carolina Democratic primary
Party	Candidate	Votes	%
Democratic	Donald S. Russell	199,619	60.8%
Democratic	Burnet R. Maybank Jr.	103,015	31.4%
Democratic	A.W. Bethea	17,251	5.3%
Democratic	Dero Cook	6,321	1.9%
Democratic	Milton Dukes	2,085	0.6%

== General election ==
The general election was held on November 6, 1962 and Donald S. Russell was elected the next governor of South Carolina without opposition. Turnout was much higher than the previous gubernatorial election because of a competitive senate race between Olin D. Johnston and W. D. Workman Jr.

South Carolina Gubernatorial Election, 1962
Party	Candidate	Votes	%	±%
Democratic	Donald S. Russell	253,704	99.99	0.0
No party	Write-Ins	17	0.01	0.0
Majority		253,687	99.98	0.0
Turnout		253,721	38.1	+23.6
Democratic hold				

== See also ==
- Governor of South Carolina
- List of governors of South Carolina
- South Carolina gubernatorial elections

Preceded by 1958	South Carolina gubernatorial elections	Succeeded by 1966
