= Washington H. Timmerman =

American politician

Washington Hodges Timmerman
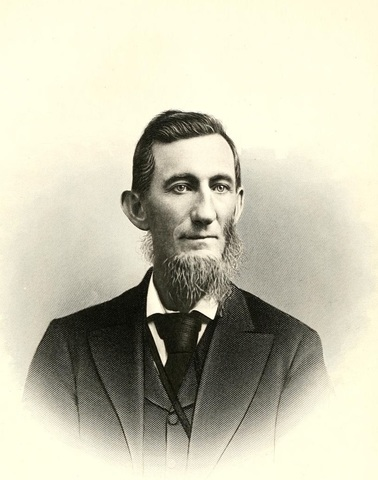

61st Lieutenant Governor of South Carolina
- In office December 22, 1893 – January 18, 1897
- Governor: Benjamin Tillman; John Gary Evans
- Preceded by: Eugene B. Gary
- Succeeded by: Miles Benjamin McSweeney

Personal details
- Born: May 29, 1832 Edgefield County, South Carolina, US
- Died: July 14, 1908 (aged 76) Aiken County, South Carolina, US

Washington Hodges Timmerman (May 29, 1832 – July 14, 1908) was an American politician. Between 1893 and 1897 he was the 61st lieutenant governor of South Carolina.

== Career ==
Washington Timmerman grew up in Edgefield County. After subsequent medical studies and his admission as a doctor, he began to work in this profession. He also worked as a farmer. During the Civil War he served in the Confederate Army, where he rose to the rank of captain. Politically, he was a member of the Democratic Party. He served in both the House of Representatives of South Carolina and the Senate of South Carolina, where he served as President Pro Tempore.

Following the resignation of Lieutenant Governor Eugene B. Gary, who resigned to serve as a justice at the South Carolina Supreme Court, Timmerman was forced to assume the vacated office of Lieutenant Governor, in accordance with the state constitution as "President Pro Tempore" of the State Senate. He was later officially elected. This position he held between 1893 and 1898. He was a deputy to the Governor and Formal Chairman of the Senate. Until 1894 he officiated under Governor Benjamin Tillman and then under his successor John Gary Evans. In 1895 Timmerman participated as a delegate to a constitutional convention of his state. He was also twice Secretary of State of South Carolina as State Treasurer. He died on July 14, 1908.

Political offices
Preceded by Eugene B. Gary	Lieutenant Governor of South Carolina; 1893–1897	Succeeded by Miles Benjamin McSweeney
