= 1898 South Carolina gubernatorial election =

1898 South Carolina Democratic gubernatorial primary runoff
- September 8, 1898
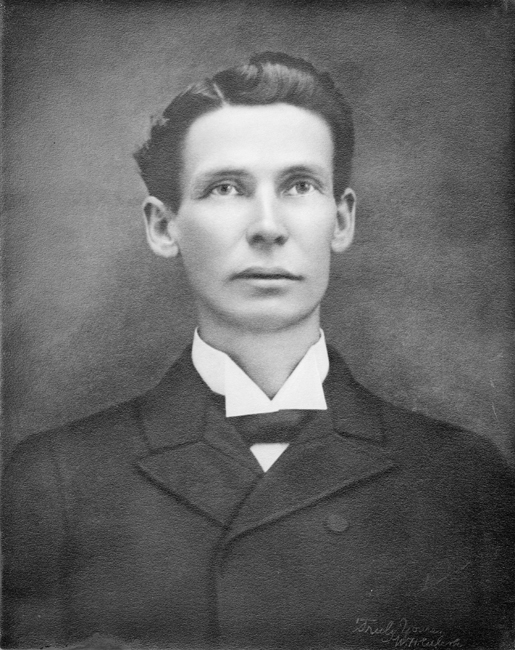

| Nominee | William Haselden Ellerbe | Claudius Cyprian Featherstone |
| Party | Democratic | Democratic |
| Popular vote | 37,723 | 33,271 |
| Percentage | 53.14% | 46.86% |
Governor before election
William Haselden Ellerbe
Democratic
Elected Governor
William Haselden Ellerbe
Democratic

The 1898 South Carolina gubernatorial election was held on November 8, 1898, to select the governor of the state of South Carolina. Governor William Haselden Ellerbe won the Democratic primary and ran unopposed in the general election to win a second term as governor.

== Democratic primary ==
The South Carolina Democratic Party held their primary for governor on August 30 and incumbent Governor Ellerbe was the frontrunner. Claudius Cyprian Featherstone won second place in the primary to advance to the runoff on September 8, but came up short against Ellerbe.

Democratic Primary
| Candidate | Votes | % |
|---|---|---|
| William Haselden Ellerbe | 30,101 | 38.4 |
| Claudius Cyprian Featherstone | 17,782 | 22.7 |
| George D. Tillman | 12,361 | 15.8 |
| O.L. Schumpert | 8,137 | 10.4 |
| R.B. Watson | 7,560 | 9.7 |
| E.L. Archer | 2,000 | 2.5 |
| G. Walton Whitman | 367 | 0.5 |

Democratic Primary Runoff
| Candidate | Votes | % | ±% |
|---|---|---|---|
| William Haselden Ellerbe | 37,723 | 53.1 | +14.7 |
| Claudius Cyprian Featherstone | 33,271 | 46.9 | +24.2 |

== General election ==
The general election was held on November 8, 1898, and William Haselden Ellerbe was reelected as the governor of South Carolina without opposition. Being a non-presidential election and few contested races, turnout was approximately half of that for the previous gubernatorial election.

South Carolina Gubernatorial Election, 1898
| Party | Candidate | Votes | % | ±% |
|---|---|---|---|---|
| Democratic | William Haselden Ellerbe (incumbent) | 28,225 | 100.00 | +10.9 |
| Majority | | 28,225 | 100.00 | +17.5 |
| Turnout | | 28,225 | | |
| Democratic hold | | | | |

65+% won by Ellerbe

== See also ==
- Governor of South Carolina
- List of governors of South Carolina
- South Carolina gubernatorial elections

| Preceded by 1896 | South Carolina gubernatorial elections | Succeeded by 1900 |
