= Eugene B. Gary =

American judge

Eugene Blackburn Gary
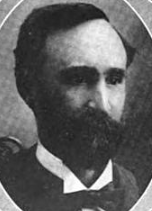

Chief Justice of South Carolina
- In office January 10, 1912 – December 10, 1926
- Preceded by: Ira B. Jones
- Succeeded by: Richard C. Watts

Associate Justice of South Carolina
- In office July 27, 1894 – January 10, 1912
- Preceded by: Samuel McGowan
- Succeeded by: Thomas B. Fraser

60th Lieutenant Governor of South Carolina
- In office December 4, 1890 – December 22, 1893
- Governor: Benjamin Tillman
- Preceded by: William L. Mauldin
- Succeeded by: Washington H. Timmerman

Personal details
- Born: August 22, 1854 Cokesbury, South Carolina, US
- Died: December 10, 1926 (aged 72) Atlanta, Georgia, US
- Spouse: Eliza Tusten
- Education: University of South Carolina

Eugene Blackburn Gary was a chief justice on the South Carolina Supreme Court.

Gary was born in Cokesbury, South Carolina on August 22, 1854. Gary enrolled at the University of South Carolina in 1872 and received a degree in the classical branches that same year. He was admitted to practice law in South Carolina in 1875. He maintained a law practice in Abbeville, South Carolina until 1894. He was elected as the chairman of the Abbeville Democratic party in 1882, 1888, 1890, and 1892. He served one term in the South Carolina General Assembly and twice as the lieutenant governor. He was elected as an associate justice of the South Carolina Supreme Court during his second term as the lieutenant governor. He was sworn in as an associate justice on July 27, 1894. He was reelected in 1900 and 1909. On January 10, 1912, he was elected to fill the unexpired term of Chief Justice Ira B. Jones who had resigned to run for governor.

Gary died on December 10, 1926.
