= Alfred W. Bethea =

American politician

Member of the South Carolina House of Representatives
- In office 1961–1966

Personal details
- Born: June 20, 1916 Dillon, South Carolina, U.S.
- Died: September 13, 1999 (aged 83)
- Party: Democratic; American Independent
- Spouse: Jo-Ann Dellinger (m. 1952)
- Education: Clemson University; Colorado State University

Alfred W. Bethea (June 20, 1916 – September 13, 1999) was an American politician. He served as a member of the South Carolina House of Representatives.

== Life and career ==
Bethea was born in Dillon, South Carolina. He attended Dillon High School, Clemson University and Colorado State University. He served in the United States Army Air Corps.

Bethea was a farmer.

In 1961, Bethea was elected to the South Carolina House of Representatives, representing Dillon County, South Carolina. The next year, he was a Democratic candidate for governor of South Carolina. In 1970, he was again a candidate for governor.

Bethea died in September 1999, at the age of 83.
