= Lemuel Boozer House =

Historic house in South Carolina, United States

- U.S. National Register of Historic Places
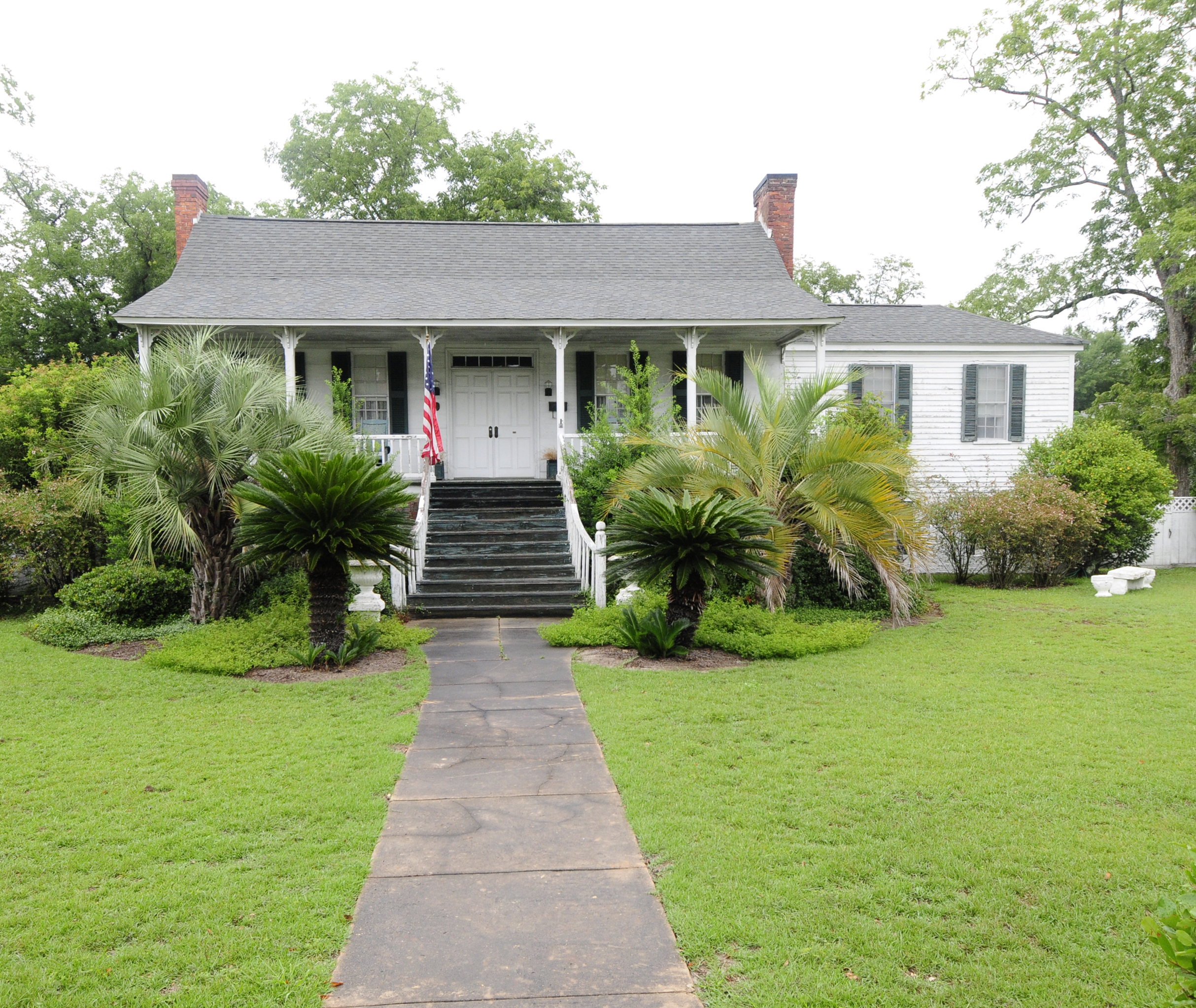
- Lemuel Boozer House, August 2012

- Location within South Carolina Location within the United States
- Location: 320 W. Main St., Lexington, South Carolina
- Coordinates: 33°59′6″N 81°14′32″W
- Area: 1.5 acres (0.61 ha)
- Built: c. 1820-1830, 1840s
- Architectural style: Greek Revival, Federal, Raised Cottage
- NRHP reference No.: 77001231
- Added to NRHP: August 16, 1977

Lemuel Boozer House, also known as the Boozer-Harmon House, is a historic home located in the town of Lexington in Lexington County, South Carolina. The home belonged to lawyer, politician, and judge Lemuel Boozer (1809-1870). It was built about 1828–1830 and is a one-story clapboard dwelling on a raised basement. It has a low-pitch gable roof and a tall basement of brick piers. A rear ell and wing were added in the 1840s. It was listed on the National Register of Historic Places in 1977. It is one of the oldest structures in the town of Lexington.

== Lemuel Boozer ==
Lemuel Boozer was a lawyer who served as state representative, state senator, and the 53rd lieutenant governor of South Carolina, and as a state circuit judge. Although Boozer was a slave owner, he did not support the Confederacy and helped Union soldiers escape from POW Camps. Boozer also started a school on the rear of this property for freed slaves after the end of the Civil War.

== See also ==
- Lieutenant Governor of South Carolina
- List of lieutenant governors of South Carolina
- South Carolina General Assembly
