= John Gary Evans =

American politician

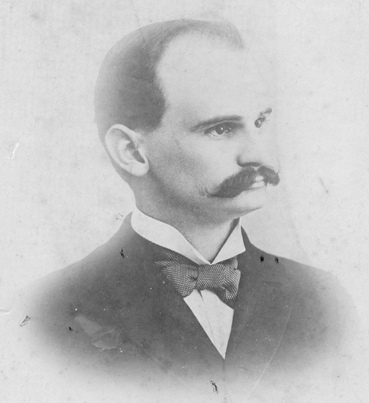

85th Governor of South Carolina
- In office December 4, 1894 – January 18, 1897
- Lieutenant: Washington H. Timmerman
- Preceded by: Benjamin Tillman
- Succeeded by: William Haselden Ellerbe

Member of the South Carolina Senate from Aiken County
- In office November 22, 1892 – November 27, 1894
- Preceded by: John Murphy Bell
- Succeeded by: Oliver Cromwell Jordan

Member of the South Carolina House of Representatives
- In office November 27, 1888 – November 22, 1892
- Constituency: Aiken County
- In office January 9, 1923 – January 13, 1925
- Constituency: Spartanburg County

Personal details
- Born: October 15, 1863 Cokesbury, South Carolina, C.S.
- Died: June 26, 1942 (aged 78) Spartanburg, South Carolina, U.S.
- Party: Democratic
- Education: Union College

Military service
- Allegiance: United States of America
- Branch/service: United States Army
- Years of service: 1898 - 1899
- Rank: Major
- Battles/wars: Spanish–American War

John Gary Evans (October 15, 1863 – June 26, 1942) was the 85th governor of South Carolina from 1894 to 1897.

== Early life ==
Evans was born in Cokesbury, South Carolina to an aristocratic and well-connected family. His father was Nathan George Evans, a Confederate general. After his father's death in 1868, Evans went to live in Edgefield with his uncle Martin Witherspoon Gary. After completing his secondary education in Cokesbury, he enrolled at Union College in Schenectady, New York. His uncle's death in 1881 forced him to withdraw from college due to financial constraints, but he would later graduate in 1883.

== Political career ==
Admitted to the bar in 1887, Evans began the practice of law in Aiken and became known for his representation of poor farmers. This representation led to the development of ties with John Lawrence Manning and Benjamin Tillman. Evans was elected in 1888 to the South Carolina House of Representatives at the age of 25. In 1892, he was elevated to the South Carolina Senate. A reform-minded politician, Evans identified himself with the progressive wing of South Carolina's Democratic Party.

His rapid political rise continued by being elected in 1894 as the 85th governor of South Carolina at the age of 31, the youngest ever South Carolina governor. During his time as governor, Evans continued the policies of Tillman, and presided over the constitution convention of 1895.

Pledging not to run for reelection as governor in 1896, Evans set his sights instead for the U.S. Senate race. He lost the election and his attempt for an open Senate seat in 1897 again proved equally unsuccessful. Frustrated, Evans volunteered as a major in the U.S. Army for the Spanish–American War in 1898 and helped create the civilian government of Havana. After the war, he resumed the practice of law in Spartanburg.

== Later life and career ==
Further attempts at an open Senate seat in 1902 and 1908 proved futile and henceforward he focused his energies on internal Democratic politics. Three times he served as a delegate to the Democratic National Conventions in 1900, 1912 and 1916. In 1914, he became the chairman of the South Carolina Democratic State Executive Committee and from 1918 to 1928 was the National Democratic Committeeman from South Carolina. Evans won a term to the South Carolina House of Representatives in 1922 from Spartanburg and served on the judiciary and rules committees.

On June 26, 1942, Evans died, and was buried at Willowbrook Cemetery in Edgefield. His Spartanburg home was listed on the National Register of Historic Places in 2007.

Party political offices
Preceded by Benjamin Tillman	Democratic nominee for Governor of South Carolina; 1894	Succeeded by William Haselden Ellerbe
Political offices
Preceded by Benjamin Tillman	Governor of South Carolina; 1894–1897	Succeeded by William Haselden Ellerbe
