= Robert Evander McNair =

American politician

Robert McNair
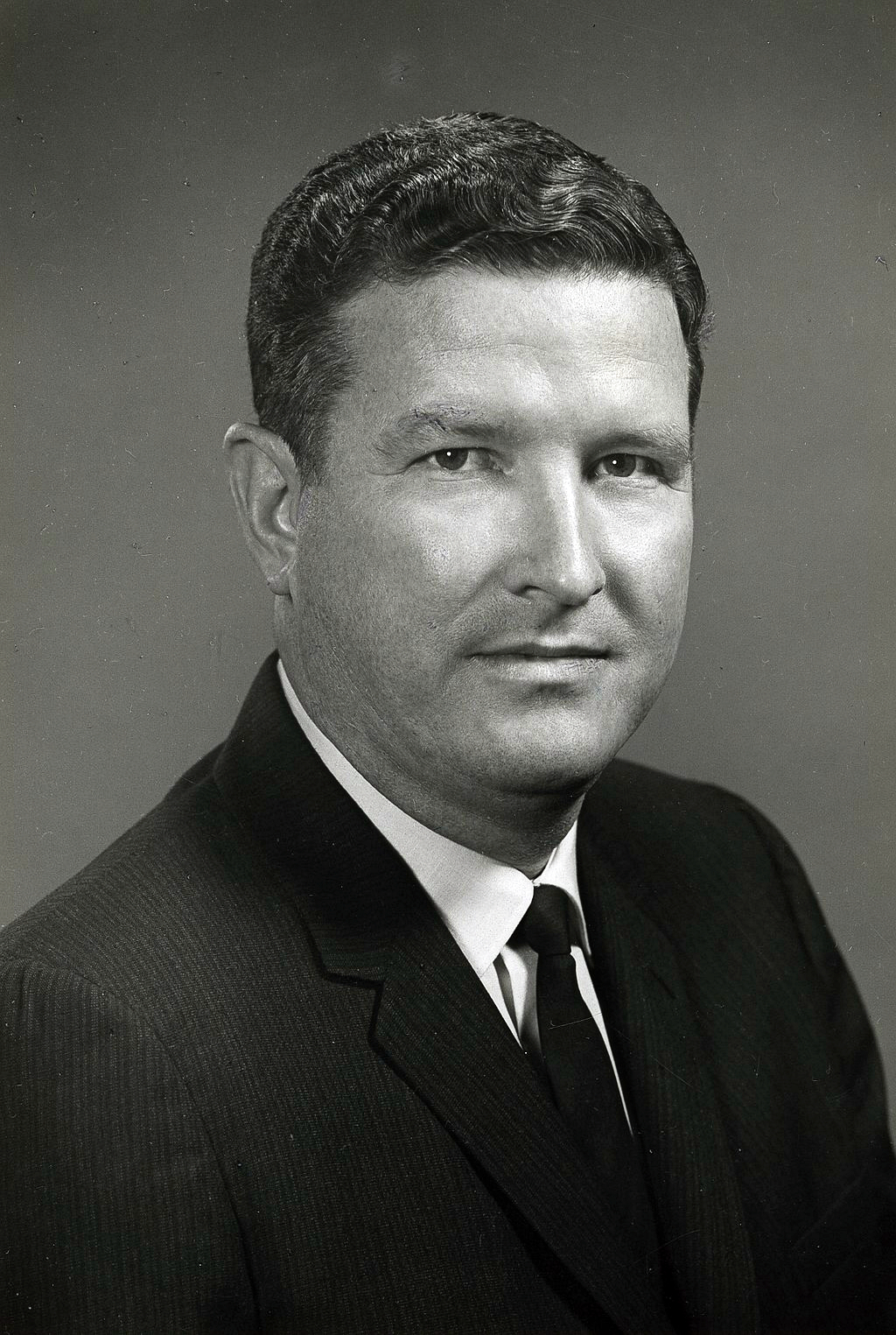
- McNair as Governor

108th Governor of South Carolina
- In office April 22, 1965 – January 19, 1971
- Lieutenant: John C. West
- Preceded by: Donald S. Russell
- Succeeded by: John C. West

79th Lieutenant Governor of South Carolina
- In office January 15, 1963 – April 22, 1965
- Governor: Donald S. Russell
- Preceded by: Burnet R. Maybank Jr.
- Succeeded by: John C. West

3rd Chair of the National Lieutenant Governors Association
- In office 1964–1965
- Preceded by: Harold H. Chase
- Succeeded by: John William Brown

Member of the South Carolina House of Representatives from the Allendale County district
- In office January 9, 1951 – January 8, 1963
- Preceded by: Audrey Williams
- Succeeded by: George Kearse

Personal details
- Born: Robert Evander McNair; December 14, 1923 Cades, South Carolina, U.S.
- Died: November 17, 2007 (aged 83) Columbia, South Carolina, U.S.
- Party: Democratic
- Spouse: Josephine Robinson
- Education: University of South Carolina (BA); University of South Carolina School of Law (JD)

Military service
- Allegiance: United States
- Branch/service: United States Navy
- Battles/wars: World War II
- Awards: Bronze Star

Robert Evander McNair Sr. (December 14, 1923 – November 17, 2007) was the 108th governor of South Carolina, a Democrat, who served from 1965 to 1971.

== Early life and education ==
McNair was born in Cades, a town in Williamsburg County, South Carolina. In 1944, he married Josephine Robinson of Allendale, South Carolina. He served in the U.S. Navy during World War II, having been awarded a Bronze Star. After the war, he completed his bachelor's degree in 1947 at the University of South Carolina, where he was a member of the Euphradian Society. He received a Juris Doctor (J.D.) degree at the same school in 1948.

While attending USC, McNair served as the first governor of the South Carolina Student Legislature, and was initiated into the Kappa Sigma fraternity.

== Early career ==
He went on to practice law in Moncks Corner and Allendale, South Carolina. from which he was elected in 1950 to the South Carolina House of Representatives. He was elected lieutenant governor in 1962, then succeeded Donald S. Russell in 1965 when Russell resigned with the understanding that McNair would appoint him to a then-vacant United States Senate seat.

== Governor of South Carolina ==
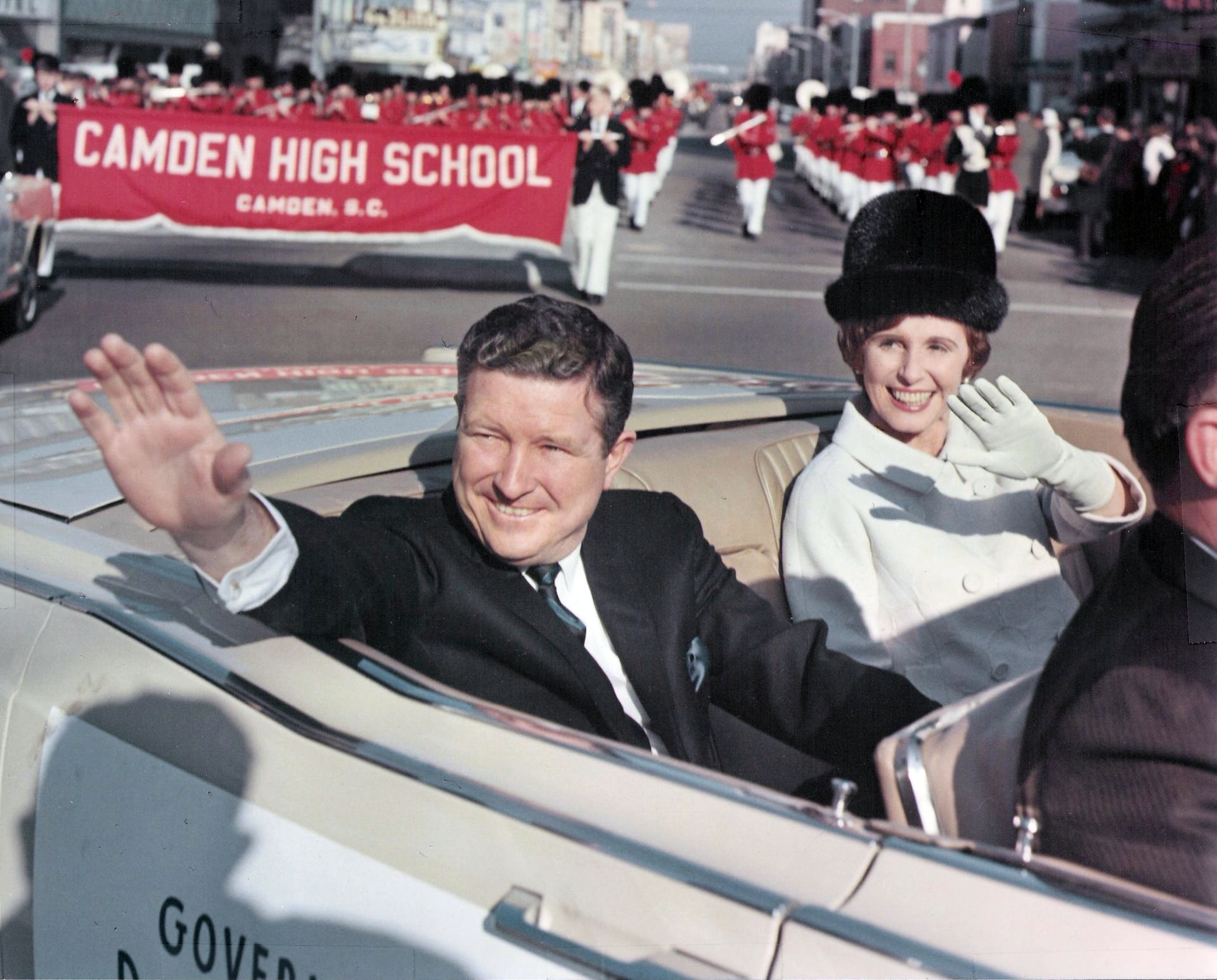
McNair at his inauguration

McNair won the 1966 general election over State Representative Joseph O. Rogers Jr., of Manning, the first Republican gubernatorial nominee in South Carolina in the 20th century.

=== Orangeburg Massacre ===
McNair was governor during the Orangeburg Massacre in 1968, which he blamed on Black Power advocates, and called it a stain on the state's good record in civil rights. In 2006, decades after leaving office, however, McNair admitted responsibility for the deaths of the three Black civil rights activists killed in Orangeburg.

He said it was "one of the saddest days in the history of South Carolina." Following this, McNair became much more proactive in working to defuse tensions that were present during the integration of the public schools.

=== National politics ===
In 1968, McNair was considered as a potential running mate for Democratic nominee Hubert Humphrey. At the 1968 Democratic National Convention, McNair served as chair of the Southern Governors Conference.

== Death and legacy ==
After his term as governor, he originated McNair Law Firm, P.A. in Columbia. He was inducted into the South Carolina Hall of Fame, and awarded an honorary doctorate in 2005 by Francis Marion University, a school which he signed into creation while governor in 1970. On May 21, 2009, McNair was inducted into the South Carolina Business Hall of Fame.

McNair was diagnosed with a cancerous brain tumor during a checkup on September 28, 2007, from which he died in Columbia on November 17.

Political offices
Preceded by Burnet R. Maybank Jr.	Lieutenant Governor of South Carolina; 1963–1965	Succeeded by John C. West
Preceded by Donald S. Russell	Governor of South Carolina; 1965–1971	Succeeded by John C. West
Party political offices
Preceded by Burnet R. Maybank Jr.	Democratic nominee for Lieutenant Governor of South Carolina; 1962	Succeeded by John C. West
Preceded by Donald S. Russell	Democratic nominee for Governor of South Carolina; 1966	Succeeded by John C. West
Preceded by Harold Hughes	Chair of the Democratic Governors Association; 1968–1969	Succeeded by John N. Dempsey
