= 1865 South Carolina gubernatorial election =

- October 18, 1865
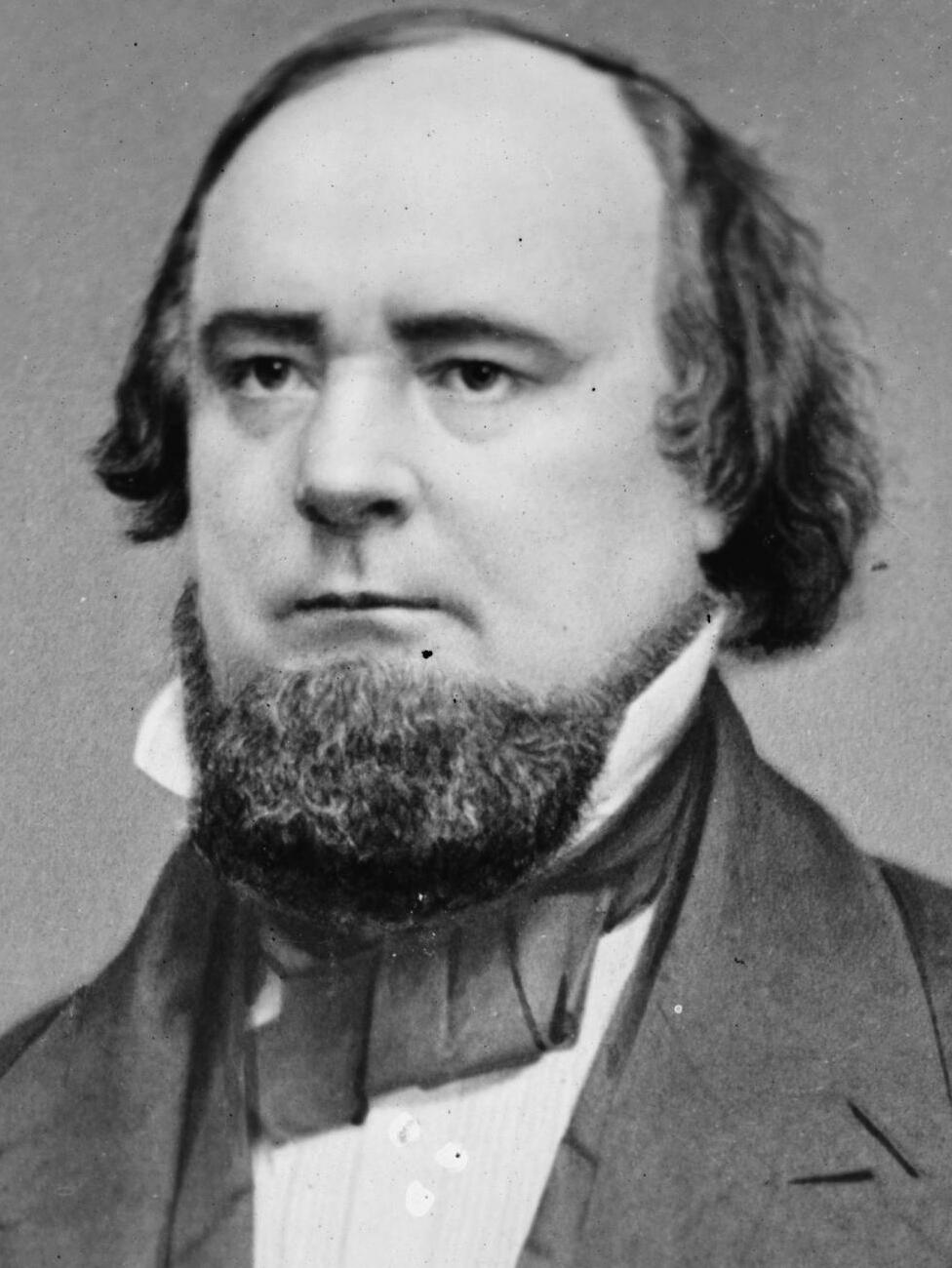

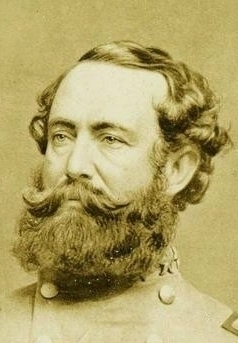
Nominee	James Lawrence Orr	Wade Hampton III
Party	Independent	Independent
Popular vote	9,928	9,186
Percentage	51.94%	48.06%
- County results Orr: 50–60% 60–70% 70–80% 80–90% >90% Hampton: 50–60% 60–70% 70–80% 80–90% >90%
Elected Governor
James Lawrence Orr

The 1865 South Carolina gubernatorial election was held on October 18, 1865, to elect the governor of South Carolina. It was the first election in which the voters of South Carolina were able to directly choose the governor as a result of the ratification of the South Carolina Constitution of 1865. However, the constitution only permitted for white men to cast ballots, with blacks being forbidden from voting.

== General election ==
The general election was held on October 18, 1865, and James Lawrence Orr was elected as the first postbellum governor of South Carolina. He won a narrow victory over Wade Hampton, who campaigned for his supporters not to vote for him. Neither candidate was aligned with any political party for the election.

=== Results ===
1865 South Carolina gubernatorial election
Party	Candidate	Votes	%
Independent	James Lawrence Orr	9,928	51.94
Independent	Wade Hampton III	9,186	48.06
Total votes		19,114	100.00

==== By county ====
County	James Lawrence Orr Independent		Wade Hampton III Independent		Margin		Total votes
County	#	%	#	%	#	%	Total votes
Abbeville	361	45.93	425	54.07	−64	−8.14	786
Anderson	696	71.38	279	28.62	417	42.76	975
Barnwell	71	13.37	460	86.63	−389	−73.26	531
Beaufort	80	25.64	232	74.36	−152	−48.72	312
Charleston	841	51.69	786	48.31	55	3.38	1,627
Chester	684	88.60	88	11.40	596	77.20	772
Chesterfield	152	66.38	77	33.62	75	32.76	229
Clarendon	126	47.73	138	52.27	−12	−4.54	264
Colleton	23	4.38	502	95.62	−479	−91.24	525
Darlington	329	55.57	263	44.43	66	11.14	592
Edgefield	528	42.96	701	57.04	−173	−14.08	1,229
Fairfield	260	85.53	44	14.47	216	71.06	304
Georgetown	83	73.45	30	26.55	53	46.90	113
Greenville	314	34.02	609	65.98	−295	−31.96	923
Horry	148	78.31	41	21.69	107	56.62	189
Kershaw	179	96.24	7	3.76	172	92.48	186
Lancaster	219	68.22	102	31.78	117	36.44	321
Laurens	575	57.56	424	42.44	151	15.12	999
Lexington	219	56.01	172	43.99	47	12.02	391
Marion	260	39.16	404	60.84	−144	−21.68	664
Marlboro	460	83.64	90	16.36	370	67.28	550
Newberry	355	49.65	360	50.35	−5	−0.70	715
Orangeburg	137	16.16	711	83.84	−574	−67.68	848
Pickens	261	22.72	888	77.28	−627	−54.56	1,149
Richland	334	92.27	28	7.73	306	84.54	362
Spartanburg	782	83.46	155	16.54	627	66.92	937
Sumter	258	36.19	455	63.81	−197	−27.62	713
Union	215	37.72	355	62.28	−140	−24.56	570
Williamsburg	51	16.40	260	83.60	−209	−67.20	311
York	927	90.26	100	9.74	827	80.52	1,027
Totals	9,928	51.94	9,186	48.06	742	3.88	19,114

== See also ==
- Governor of South Carolina
- List of governors of South Carolina
- South Carolina gubernatorial elections

== Sources ==
- Reynolds, John S. (1969). Reconstruction in South Carolina. Negro University Press. ISBN 0-8371-1638-4.
- "The Official Returns of the Governors Elections". The Charleston Daily Courier. November 30, 1865. p. 2.

Preceded by none	South Carolina gubernatorial elections	Succeeded by 1868
