= South Carolina Dispensary =

State-run monopoly on liquor sales, 1893–1916

The South Carolina Dispensary system was a state-run monopoly on liquor sales in the United States state of South Carolina which operated from 1893 to 1907 statewide and until 1916 in some counties. The system was the brainchild of Governor Benjamin Tillman, a farmer from Edgefield known as "Pitchfork Ben," who served as governor from 1890 to 1894 and as a U.S. Senator from 1895 until his death in 1918. This experiment had never before been tried at the state level, and proved to be the last time a state would require all liquor sold within its borders to be bottled and dispensed through state-run facilities. The South Carolina Dispensary system came to be known as "Ben Tillman's Baby".

== Demand for prohibition ==
Heath and Kinnard (1980) analyzes the background and motivation of the prohibitionists in South Carolina and the five referendums on prohibition between 1892 and 1940. After the prohibitionists won the 1892 referendum, Ben Tillman convinced the state legislature to adopt the dispensary system, whereby the state received the profits from the sale of liquor and tightly controlled it at the same time. Although the prohibition forces won subsequent referendums, the state was reluctant to close down the dispensary system because of the revenue it generated. Religious reasons as well as proximity to Charleston (the farther away the county, the more likely it was to vote for prohibition), were the two major reasons for supporting prohibition, or otherwise, in South Carolina.

Prohibitionist sentiment, supported by Baptist and Methodist ministers, grew rapidly in the 1880s. In 1889 a bill proposing prohibition of alcoholic beverage was introduced in the S.C. House and failed to pass by a margin of only eight votes. In 1890 the House passed a measure that was ultimately defeated in the Senate. Most observers thought South Carolina would have become a "dry" state if not for the advent of the dispensary system. After Tillman and his poor farmer coalition ("wool hat boys") came to power in 1890, the dispensary system became his answer to the liquor question. The South Carolina General Assembly established the state dispensary system in a rush vote at 5:30 A.M. on the last day of the session, December 24, 1892. The sentiments of the "wets", or anti-prohibitionists, was that the system was better than prohibition, as liquor was still legal, whereas the "dries", or prohibitionists, saw the system as a step towards prohibition, but outright prohibition is what they ultimately wanted; neither side was happy with the new law.

== The Dispensary in operation ==
The monopoly the state created was complete; wholesale and retail sales were controlled by the dispensary system through a state board of control, which consisted of the governor, comptroller general and attorney general. Day-to-day administration was in the hands of a state commissioner appointed by the governor. The commissioner was charged with procuring all liquors that were to be subsequently bottled by the state dispensary and sold to county dispensaries. Preference was to be given to local brewers and distillers. Liquor bottled by the state dispensary was the only liquor to be sold legally in South Carolina. From 1893 to 1900 the bottles used by the dispensary had an embossed design featuring a palmetto tree with crossed logs under the base of the trunk, and from 1900 to 1907 an overlaying and intertwining S, C and D "script" design replaced the tree design. This was largely because prohibitionists objected to having such a prominent state symbol as the palmetto tree embossed on liquor bottles. The script, or monogram design, remained on dispensary bottles until the end of the system in 1907.

== End of the Dispensary ==
The corruption of the Dispensary as a political machine alarmed Progressive-era reformers, along with the church element that wanted complete prohibition. The General Assembly passed the Bryce law in 1904 that allowed for counties to choose whether they would allow for the sale of alcohol. Many of the Upstate counties voted to ban the sale of alcohol and it was not too long before the General Assembly discussed the viability of the Dispensary itself. In 1907, the Carey-Cothran law was passed that abolished the State Dispensary and provided for the establishment of dispensaries in every county that chose to remain wet.

The counties that operated dispensaries grew prosperous from the revenues generated by the sale of alcohol, but prohibitionist sentiment was irresistible and in 1915 the dry counties sought to end the sale of alcohol throughout the state. A referendum held in the state on the question of prohibition saw two-to-one support from the voters, and the General Assembly subsequently enacted a law in 1916 to ban the sale of alcohol and limit importation from other states.

== Bottle varieties ==
Most surviving artifacts of the S.C. Dispensary are the glass bottles produced to package and sell alcohol. Today, many of these bottles are sought after by collectors not for their looks or decorative value but rather for their historical significance.

Today, many bottle collectors seek S.C. Dispensary bottles, which have become fairly scarce in terms of common varieties. A few varieties are exceedingly rare and are worth $20,000 or more to collectors. Some specimens bring just under $30,000, under the right conditions.

The most common type of S.C. Dispensary bottle is the "jo-jo" flask, which is a flask with flat panels front and back, rounded shoulders, and a rounding towards the base. These were made and used throughout the life of the dispensary system. Another type of flask, the union flask, was used until the turn of the 20th century, and none were made with the monogram design. Unlike the jo-jos, which all bore the legend "SC Dispensary", unions bore both this and "South Carolina Dispensary". Half-pint, pint, and one quart cylindrical bottles were also made and used.

Stoneware jugs were produced in two major variants. They consist of ones made in Edgefield District, South Carolina and ones made in Virginia.

The South Carolina variations were made in half-gallon and gallon sizes, all were made from local clay with the palmetto tree and S. C. Dispensary stamped by hand after being wheel turned. In June 1893, the state purchased 2,118 half-gallon jugs and 2,046 one-gallon jugs from J. G. Baynham of Trenton at a total cost of $217.35. The half-gallon jugs were 3.5 cents each and the one-gallon jugs were 7 cents each. The vast majority were made by Baynham, but the Hahn(or Horne) family assisted with some of the production.

A fine example of one of these jugs can bring $7,000 to $9,000. A lot of factors go into making it a "fine example".

The Virginia stoneware jugs were not wheel turned but made with a Jigger-Mold or similar process. The three main varieties of these and all known specimens are stamped with a blue state emblem and the dispensary name under a clear silica/glass glaze. These will bring $2,500 to $3,500 depending on condition and variation.

There are fakes on the market of both variants and a couple of the glass bottles.

There are other non-typical bottle types, and some bottles which were not embossed, being marked as a dispensary item by label only. A much sought after item is the two-ounce capacity souvenir commemorative dispensary bottle made for the South Carolina Interstate and West Indian Exposition in Charleston, S.C. which was held in 1901–1902. With different glass color varieties, glass manufacturers, and design nuances, there are many varieties of S.C. Dispensary bottles to be collected. Each S.C. Dispensary bottle is unique due to being blown in a mold by a glassblower, as the Owens AR automatic bottle-making machine was not yet in widespread use.
