= Miles Benjamin McSweeney =

American politician

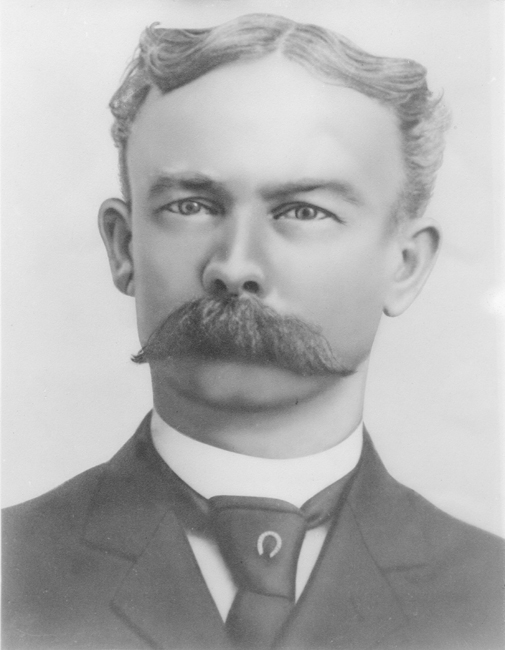

87th Governor of South Carolina
- In office June 2, 1899 – January 20, 1903
- Lieutenant: Robert B. Scarborough; James H. Tillman
- Preceded by: William Haselden Ellerbe
- Succeeded by: Duncan Clinch Heyward

62nd Lieutenant Governor of South Carolina
- In office January 18, 1897 – June 2, 1899
- Governor: William Haselden Ellerbe
- Preceded by: W.H. Timmerman
- Succeeded by: Robert B. Scarborough

Member of the South Carolina House of Representatives from Hampton County
- In office November 27, 1894 – January 12, 1897

Personal details
- Born: April 18, 1855 Charleston, South Carolina, US
- Died: September 29, 1909 (aged 54) Baltimore, Maryland, US
- Party: Democratic
- Education: Washington and Lee University
- Profession: Newspaper editor

Miles Benjamin McSweeney (April 18, 1855 – September 29, 1909) was the 87th governor of South Carolina from June 2, 1899, to January 20, 1903.

== Early life and education ==
Born in Charleston, McSweeney's father died when he was four years old. He started working at a young age to help support his family, as a paperboy and a clerk in a bookstore. He became corresponding secretary of the Columbia Typographical Union.

He studied at evening school and earned the Typographical Union of Charleston Scholarship to attend Washington and Lee University in Lexington, Virginia, but later had to withdraw due to lack of funds.

== Career ==
McSweeney served in the state militia with the rank of major, and was later promoted to lieutenant colonel. In 1877, he started publishing the Ninety-Six Guardian at the age of 22, and moved to Hampton two years later to start the Hampton County Guardian.

In 1894, McSweeney was elected to the South Carolina House of Representatives and additionally served as the chairman of the Hampton County Democratic Party. He successfully ran for Lieutenant Governor in 1896 and was elevated to the governorship following the death of Governor William Haselden Ellerbe on June 2, 1899.

A proponent of the state Dispensary and backed by Senator Ben Tillman, McSweeney won a term on his own in the gubernatorial election of 1900. However, many in Hampton were in favor of prohibition and the Hampton County Guardian lost advertising revenue and subscriptions because of McSweeney's support of the Dispensary.

== Later life ==
Upon the completion of his term as governor in 1903, McSweeney returned to Hampton and continued as editor of the Hampton County Guardian.

He died at the Mount Hope Sanitarium in Baltimore on September 29, 1909, and was buried at Hampton Cemetery in Hampton.

Party political offices
Preceded by William Haselden Ellerbe	Democratic nominee for Governor of South Carolina; 1900	Succeeded by Duncan Clinch Heyward
Political offices
Preceded by W.H. Timmerman	Lieutenant Governor of South Carolina; 1897–1899	Succeeded by Robert B. Scarborough
Preceded by William Haselden Ellerbe	Governor of South Carolina; 1899–1903	Succeeded by Duncan Clinch Heyward
