= Burnet R. Maybank Jr. =

American politician

78th Lieutenant Governor of South Carolina
- In office January 20, 1959 – January 15, 1963
- Governor: Fritz Hollings
- Preceded by: Fritz Hollings
- Succeeded by: Robert Evander McNair

Member of the South Carolina House of Representatives
- In office 1953–1958

Personal details
- Born: Burnet Rhett Maybank Jr. May 2, 1924 Charleston, South Carolina
- Died: October 25, 2016 (aged 92) Charleston, South Carolina
- Party: Democratic; Republican
- Spouse: Marion Mitchell Maybank
- Relations: Burnet R. Maybank (father)
- Children: Marion, Burnet Maybank III
- Education: The Citadel; University of South Carolina
- Occupation: Lawyer

Burnet Rhett Maybank Jr. (May 2, 1924 – October 25, 2016) was an American lawyer and politician in the state of South Carolina. He was the son of Governor of South Carolina and Senator Burnet Maybank.

== Early life and education ==
Maybank was educated at Episcopal High School in Alexandria, Virginia. He joined The Citadel, The Military College of South Carolina from 1941 to 1942, and served in World War II with the United States Army Air Corps, participating in 31 combat missions over Western Europe. He later attended the University of South Carolina, graduating with a LL.B. in 1950.

== Career ==
He was also admitted to the South Carolina bar that same year and practiced law in Greenville, South Carolina, and Charleston, South Carolina. Maybank served as a Democrat in the South Carolina House of Representatives from 1953 to 1958. He later served as the 78th lieutenant governor of South Carolina under governor Fritz Hollings from 1959 to 1963.

Later, Maybank switched to the Republican Party. He served on the Charleston County Council until his retirement. Maybank died on October 25, 2016, at the age of 92. He married Marion Mitchell on January 22, 1949, and had two children, Marion and Burnet Rhett III.

Party political offices
Preceded by Fritz Hollings	Democratic nominee for Lieutenant Governor of South Carolina; 1958	Succeeded by Robert Evander McNair
Political offices
Preceded by Ernest Hollings	Lieutenant Governor of South Carolina; 1959–1963	Succeeded by Robert Evander McNair
