= Donald S. Russell =

American judge (1906–1998)

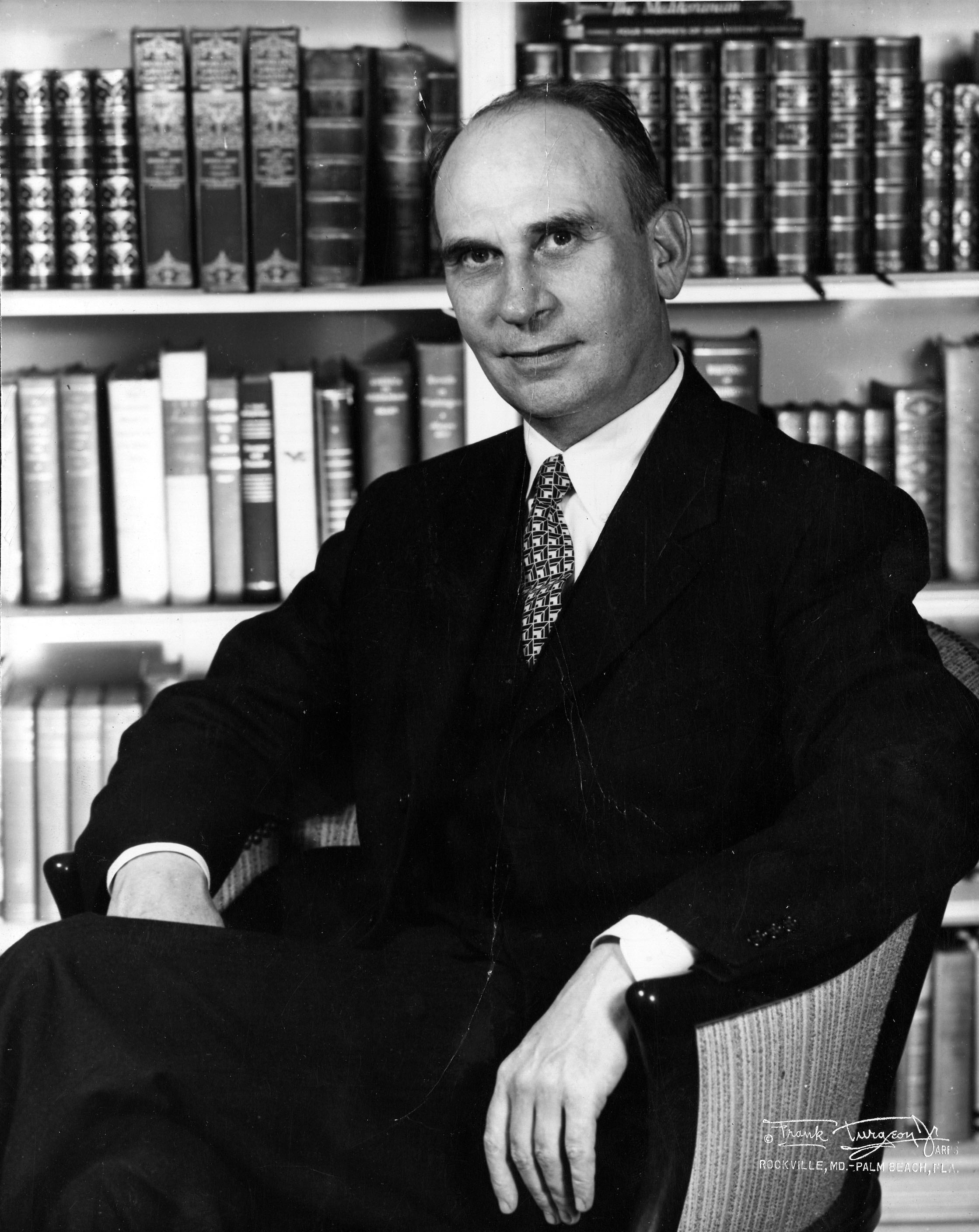
- Official portrait, 1953

Judge of the United States Court of Appeals for the Fourth Circuit
- In office April 23, 1971 – February 22, 1998
- Appointed by: Richard Nixon
- Preceded by: Simon Sobeloff
- Succeeded by: William Byrd Traxler Jr.

Judge of the United States District Court for the District of South Carolina
- In office November 3, 1966 – May 1, 1971
- Appointed by: Lyndon B. Johnson
- Preceded by: Charles Cecil Wyche
- Succeeded by: Solomon Blatt Jr.

United States Senator from South Carolina
- In office April 22, 1965 – November 8, 1966
- Appointed by: Robert Evander McNair
- Preceded by: Olin D. Johnston
- Succeeded by: Fritz Hollings

107th Governor of South Carolina
- In office January 15, 1963 – April 22, 1965
- Lieutenant: Robert Evander McNair
- Preceded by: Fritz Hollings
- Succeeded by: Robert Evander McNair

21st President of the University of South Carolina
- In office 1952–1957
- Preceded by: Francis Wright Bradley
- Succeeded by: Robert Sumwalt

3rd Assistant Secretary of State for Administration
- In office September 24, 1945 – January 20, 1947
- President: Harry S. Truman
- Preceded by: Frank McCarthy
- Succeeded by: John Peurifoy

Personal details
- Born: Donald Stuart Russell; February 22, 1906 Lafayette Springs, Lafayette County, Mississippi, U.S.
- Died: February 22, 1998 (aged 92) Spartanburg, South Carolina, U.S.
- Resting place: Greenlawn Memorial Gardens, Spartanburg, South Carolina
- Party: Democratic
- Education: University of South Carolina, Columbia (AB, LLB); University of Michigan, Ann Arbor
- Profession: Politician, Jurist, Lawyer, Academic administrator

Military service
- Allegiance: United States
- Branch/service: United States Army
- Rank: Major
- Battles/wars: World War II

Donald Stuart Russell (February 22, 1906 – February 22, 1998) was an American politician, attorney, judge, and academic administrator from South Carolina. A Democrat, Russell served as the 107th governor of South Carolina served from 1963 to 1965, which was followed by a stint as U.S. Senator from South Carolina from 1965 to 1966.

Russell went on to become district judge of the District Court for the District of South Carolina and a circuit judge of the United States Court of Appeals for the Fourth Circuit. Prior to his political career, Russell served as an Assistant Secretary of State in the 1940s, and was president of the University of South Carolina in the 1950s. Russell was a close ally and political protege of James F. Byrnes.

== Early life and education ==
Russell was born on February 22, 1906, in the unincorporated community of Lafayette Springs in Lafayette County, Mississippi, his father dying the year of his birth. In 1914, he moved with his family to Chester, South Carolina. He received an Artium Baccalaureus degree from the University of South Carolina in 1925.

Russell received a Bachelor of Laws from University of South Carolina School of Law and passed the South Carolina bar in 1928. He studied graduate level law at the University of Michigan Law School in 1929.

== Early career ==
Russell was in private practice of law in Union, South Carolina, from 1929 to 1930. He was in private practice of law with the law firm of Nichols, Wyche and Byrnes in Spartanburg, South Carolina, from 1930 to 1942. He was in private practice of law in Spartanburg from 1947 to 1951 and from 1957 to 1963. Additionally, Russell served as president of the University of South Carolina from 1951 to 1957.

Russell served on the Price Adjustment Board of the War Department and as assistant director of economic stabilization in 1942, and in 1943 became an assistant to the director of war mobilization. Russell was in the United States Army as a major in 1944 and became deputy director of the Office of War Mobilization Reconversion in 1945.

=== Service as Assistant Secretary of State ===
In 1947, Russell began service as Assistant Secretary of State for Administration. He was a protégé of former Secretary of State James F. Byrnes. During that time, he became involved in the case of "Mr. Blank" and nine other State Department officials, dismissed for unspecified charges related to loyalty. The case became a sensation when journalist Bert Andrews obtained a secret transcript of Mr. Blank's case and published a series of articles in the New York Herald-Tribune starting on November 2, 1947.

== Governor of South Carolina ==
In 1958, he ran unsuccessfully for Governor of South Carolina, losing the Democratic primary to Fritz Hollings. In 1962, he was elected the 107th Governor of South Carolina, and would serve from 1963 to 1965. On April 22, 1965, Russell resigned as governor, after which new governor Robert E. McNair appointed him to fill the Senate seat vacated by the death of Olin D. Johnston, serving through 1966. Russell ran in the special election to complete the Senate term, but once again lost the Democratic primary to Hollings.

=== Notable events during his tenure ===
On January 28, 1963, Clemson University enrolled its first-ever African-American student, Harvey Gantt, who would later become Mayor of Charlotte. On September 16, 1964, former Governor Strom Thurmond announced his move to the Republican Party. On October 29, 1964, Greenville native Charles Townes won the Nobel Prize in Physics. On November 3, 1964, a majority of South Carolina voters supported Barry Goldwater, the first Republican presidential candidate since Reconstruction to carry the state.

== Federal judicial service ==
Russell was nominated by President Lyndon B. Johnson on October 11, 1966, to a seat on the United States District Court for the District of South Carolina vacated by the death of Judge Charles Cecil Wyche. He was confirmed to this office by his fellow members of the United States Senate on October 20, 1966, and received his commission on November 3, 1966. His service was terminated on May 1, 1971, due to his elevation to the Fourth Circuit.

Russell was nominated by President Richard Nixon on April 7, 1971, to a seat on the United States Court of Appeals for the Fourth Circuit vacated by Judge Simon Sobeloff. He was confirmed by the Senate on April 21, 1971, and received his commission on April 23, 1971. His service was terminated on February 22, 1998, due to his death.

== Relationship with James F. Byrnes ==
Russell's most notable political/professional relationship was with James F. Byrnes:

Russell's relationship with Byrnes became very important over the following years, particularly as Byrnes took on increasingly prominent positions in the Roosevelt administration. Russell went to Washington as Byrnes' assistant when Byrnes was appointed director of the Office of Economic Stabilization in October 1942. In May 1943, Russell followed Byrnes to the Office of War Mobilization and Reconversion, which Byrnes had been appointed to direct. In October 1944 Russell went on active duty serving at the Army's Supreme Allied Headquarters in Europe. Major Russell was discharged later that year. In early 1945, Russell served as Deputy Director of the Office of War Mobilization and Reconversion, then as Assistant Secretary of State for Administration, under Byrnes, from August 1945 to January 1947. Russell implemented plans for the reorganization of the Foreign Service and developed the first series of continual regional foreign policy statements, which was later to become standard practice. Russell's interest in the foreign service later led to his involvement on several federal committees. As the assistant to Byrnes, Russell was at Potsdam with President Harry Truman and Byrnes and took part in the decision to drop the first atomic bomb. Byrnes and Russell left the administration shortly after the war ended and joined Hogan & Hartson, a Washington, D.C., law firm.

== Personal life, death and legacy ==
Russell was a Methodist. Russell married Virginia Utsey; they had four children. Russell died on his 92nd birthday, February 22, 1998. His Spartanburg home was listed on the National Register of Historic Places in 2007. When he died, he left an estate of over $30 million ($50 million in 2018), which he gained through sound investments in banks, insurance and utility companies.

Government offices
Preceded by Frank McCarthy	Assistant Secretary of State for Administration; September 24, 1945 – January 20, 1947	Succeeded by John Peurifoy
Party political offices
Preceded by Ernest Hollings	Democratic nominee for Governor of South Carolina; 1962	Succeeded by Robert Evander McNair
Political offices
Preceded by Ernest Hollings	Governor of South Carolina; January 15, 1963 – April 22, 1965	Succeeded by Robert Evander McNair
U.S. Senate
Preceded by Olin D. Johnston	U.S. senator (Class 3) from South Carolina; April 22, 1965 – November 8, 1966; Served alongside: Strom Thurmond	Succeeded by Ernest Hollings
Legal offices
Preceded by Charles Cecil Wyche	Judge of the United States District Court for the District of South Carolina; November 3, 1966 – May 1, 1971	Succeeded by Solomon Blatt Jr.
Preceded by Simon Sobeloff	Judge of the United States Court of Appeals for the Fourth Circuit; April 23, 1971 – February 22, 1998	Succeeded by William Byrd Traxler Jr.
