= South Carolina Democratic Party =

South Carolina affiliate of the Democratic Party

- Chairperson: Christale Spain
- Senate Minority Leader: Brad Hutto
- House Minority Leader: J. Todd Rutherford
- Headquarters: 1929 Gadsden; Columbia, South Carolina
- National affiliation: Democratic Party
- Colors: Blue
- Seats in the U.S. Senate: 0 / 2
- Seats in the U.S. House of Representatives: 1 / 7
- Statewide Executive Offices: 1 / 9
- Seats in the South Carolina Senate: 15 / 46
- Seats in the South Carolina House of Representatives: 36 / 124

Website
- www.scdp.org

The South Carolina Democratic Party is the affiliate of the Democratic Party in the U.S. state of South Carolina. It is headquartered in Columbia, South Carolina.

== History ==
The Democratic Party thrived during the Second Party System between 1832 and the mid-1850s and was one of the causes of the collapse of the Whig Party.

Between 1880 and 1948, South Carolina's Democratic Party dominated state politics. The 1948 presidential election marked the winds of change as Strom Thurmond ran on behalf of the States' Rights Democratic Party (Dixiecrats). He accumulated 71% of the votes cast in South Carolina that year.

Nearly 100 years after the conclusion of the American Civil War (around 1949), the state was still preoccupied with racial tension, which muffled the debate about essentially all other issues. During this time, all politics revolved around the Democratic Party. Furthermore, a single faction typically dominated local politics. South Carolina was locked into the traditionalistic culture dominant throughout the South. Political change was often resisted by South Carolina's agrarian leaders. The agrarian leaders were middle-class farmers that were thought to maintain the status quo of the Democratic Party. In 1942, a party convention overwhelmingly voted to continue the all-white primary to prevent African-American influence. For much of South Carolina's history, the lower class was generally not allowed to vote.

A major shift began in South Carolina politics with President Lyndon B. Johnson's Civil Rights Act of 1964, with whites switching to the Republican Party.

== Current elected officials ==
The South Carolina Democratic Party currently control one statewide office and holds minorities in both the South Carolina Senate and House of Representatives. Democrats hold one of the state's seven U.S. House seats.

=== Members of Congress ===
==== U.S. Senate ====
Republicans have controlled both of South Carolina's seats in the U.S. Senate since 2005. Fritz Hollings was the last Democrat to represent South Carolina in the U.S. Senate. First elected in a 1966 special election, Hollings opted to retire instead of seeking a seventh full term. Superintendent of Education Inez Tenenbaum ran as the Democratic nominee in the 2004 election and was subsequently defeated by Republican challenger Jim DeMint.

U.S. Senator-elect Annie Andrews

==== U.S. House of Representatives ====
Out of the seven seats South Carolina is apportioned in the U.S. House of Representatives, one is held by Democrats:

| District | Member | Photo |
|---|---|---|
| 1st | Nancy Lacore (elect) | |
| 6th | Jim Clyburn | |

=== Statewide offices ===
- Comptroller General: Brian J. Gaines (appointed)

South Carolina has not elected any Democratic candidates to statewide office since 2006, when Jim Rex was elected as the Superintendent of Education. In 2010, Rex opted not to run for re-election; instead, he ran unsuccessfully for the Democratic nomination for Governor.

=== State legislative leaders ===
- Senate Minority Leader: Brad Hutto
- House Minority Leader: Todd Rutherford

== Officers and staff ==
As of April 29, 2023, the state party officers were:

- Chair: Christale Spain
- 1st Vice Chair: Rep. Roger K. Kirby
- 2nd Vice Chair: Hannah Cromley
- 3rd Vice Chair: Ralph Prioleau
- Secretary: Joyce Rose-Harris
- Treasurer: Kendra Dove

State Party Staff:

- Executive Director: Jay Parmley
- Political Director: Michael Hobbs
- Data Director: Matt Greene

== Members of the Democratic National Committee ==
Three members of the South Carolina Democratic Party also serve on the Democratic National Committee. These are:

- Bre Maxwell
- Carol Fowler
- Clay Middleton

== Election results ==
=== Federal ===
==== U.S. Senate ====
Class 2
| Year | Candidate | Votes | % | Result |
|---|---|---|---|---|
| 1984 | Melvin Purvis | 306,982 | 31.80% | Lost ✗ |
| 1990 | Bob Cunningham | 244,112 | 32.52% | Lost ✗ |
| 1996 | Elliott Close | 511,226 | 43.99% | Lost ✗ |
| 2002 | Alex Sanders | 487,359 | 44.19% | Lost ✗ |
| 2008 | Bob Conley | 790,216 | 42.25% | Lost ✗ |
| 2014 | Brad Hutto | 480,933 | 55.73% | Lost ✗ |
| 2020 | Jaime Harrison | 1,110,828 | 44.17% | Lost ✗ |
| 2026 | Annie Andrews | 1,044,001 | 51.14% | Won ✓ |

Class 3
| Year | Candidate | Votes | % | Result |
|---|---|---|---|---|
| 1986 | Fritz Hollings | 463,354 | 63.07% | Won ✓ |
| 1992 | Fritz Hollings | 591,030 | 50.07% | Won ✓ |
| 1998 | Fritz Hollings | 562,791 | 52.70% | Won ✓ |
| 2004 | Inez Tenenbaum | 704,384 | 44.10% | Lost ✗ |
| 2010 | Alvin Greene | 364,598 | 27.65% | Lost ✗ |
| 2014 (sp.) | Joyce Dickerson | 459,583 | 37.09% | Lost ✗ |
| 2016 | Thomas Dixon | 757,022 | 36.93% | Lost ✗ |
| 2022 | Krystle Matthews | 627,616 | 37.01% | Lost ✗ |

==== U.S. House ====
| Election | Votes | % | Seats (SC) | ± | % |
|---|---|---|---|---|---|
| 2016 | 800,801 | 39.27 | 1 / 7 | 0 | 6.20 |
| 2018 | 758,340 | 44.37 | 2 / 7 | ▲1 | 4.90 |
| 2020 | 1,076,799 | 42.89 | 1 / 7 | ▼1 | 1.39 |
| 2022 | 517,129 | 32.27 | 1 / 7 | 0 | 10.17 |
| 2024 | 960,885 | 39.51 | 1 / 7 | 0 | 7.24 |
| 2026 | 1,008,238 | 48.13 | 2 / 7 | ▲1 | 8.62 |

=== State ===
==== Executive offices ====
Governor
| Election | Candidate | Votes | % | Result |
|---|---|---|---|---|
| 1962 | Donald S. Russell | 199,619 | 60.81% | Won ✓ |
| 1962 | Burnet R. Maybank Jr. | 103,015 | 31.38% | Lost ✗ |
| 1962 | Alfred W. Bethea | 17,251 | 5.25% | Lost ✗ |
| 1966 | Robert Evander McNair | 255,854 | 58.16% | Won ✓ |
| 1970 | John C. West | 251,151 | 52.09% | Won ✓ |
| 1974 | William Jennings Bryan Dorn | 248,861 | 47.04% | Lost ✗ |
| 1978 | Richard Riley | 1,737,888 | 46.44% | Won ✓ |
| 1982 | Richard Riley | 468,787 | 69.78% | Won ✓ |
| 1986 | Michael R. Daniel | 361,328 | 47.94% | Lost ✗ |
| 1990 | Theo Mitchell | 212,048 | 27.86% | Lost ✗ |
| 1994 | Nick Theodore | 447,002 | 47.87% | Lost ✗ |
| 1998 | Jim Hodges | 570,070 | 53.23% | Won ✓ |
| 2002 | Jim Hodges | 521,140 | 47.05% | Lost ✗ |
| 2006 | Tommy Moore | 489,076 | 44.79% | Lost ✗ |
| 2010 | Vincent Sheheen | 630,535 | 46.91% | Lost ✗ |
| 2014 | Vincent Sheheen | 516,166 | 41.42% | Lost ✗ |
| 2018 | James E. Smith Jr./Mandy Powers Norrell | 784,182 | 45.92% | Lost ✗ |
| 2022 | Joe Cunningham/Tally Parham Casey | 692,691 | 40.67% | Lost ✗ |
| 2026 | Jermaine Johsnon/Sam Skardon | 960,534 | 47.13% | Lost ✗ |

== See also ==
- Progressive Democratic Party (South Carolina)
- South Carolina Republican Party
- South Carolina Green Party
- South Carolina Workers Party
- Alliance Party
