= William Haselden Ellerbe =

American politician (1862–1899)

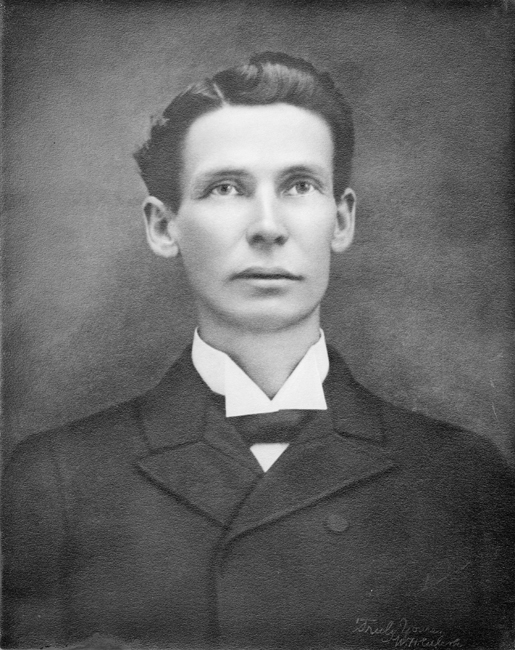
- Ellerbe in the 1890s

86th Governor of South Carolina
- In office January 18, 1897 – June 2, 1899
- Lieutenant: Miles Benjamin McSweeney
- Preceded by: John Gary Evans
- Succeeded by: Miles Benjamin McSweeney

24th South Carolina Comptroller General
- In office 1890 – 1894
- Governor: Benjamin Tillman
- Preceded by: John S. Verner
- Succeeded by: James W. Horton

Personal details
- Born: April 7, 1862 Marion, South Carolina, US
- Died: June 2, 1899 (aged 37) Sellers, South Carolina, US
- Party: Democratic
- Relations: J. Edwin Ellerbe (brother)
- Children: 6, including Earle and Frank

William Haselden Ellerbe (April 7, 1862 – June 2, 1899) was an American politician. A Democrat, he was the 86th Governor of South Carolina.

Ellerbe was the brother of Congressman J. Edwin Ellerbe. He entered politics in 1890 and was soon elected South Carolina Comptroller General. A member of Benjamin Tillman's circle, he became Governor. He died while serving as Governor, from tuberculosis.

== Early life and education ==
Ellerbe was born on April 7, 1862, in Marion, South Carolina, one of thirteen children born to planter William S. Ellerbe and Sarah E. (née Haselden) Ellerbe. His younger brother was politician J. Edwin Ellerbe. He was of English ancestry. His family is the namesake of Ellerbe, North Carolina. He grew up in the Pee Dee region. He was educated by private tutors. In 1880, he began attending Wofford College, then studied at Vanderbilt University, failing to graduate from either due to illness. He worked as a planter and a businessman.

== Politics ==
Ellerbe was a Democrat. He entered politics in 1889, as part of the Farmers' Alliance. A newspaper compared his rise to political prominence to Lucius Quinctius Cincinnatus, as he had previously been a planter. From 1890 to 1894, he was South Carolina Comptroller General, and as which was the youngest statewide officeholder in South Carolina history. Politically, he was conservative and aligned with Benjamin Tillman, though was more moderate. In 1894, he unsuccessfully ran for Governor.

Ellerbe served as Governor of South Carolina from January 18, 1897, until his death. Miles Benjamin McSweeney served as Lieutenant Governor under him. In his first term, he won the first Democratic primary to be held in South Carolina. While Governor, he organzied local soldiers to fight in the Spanish–American War. He also passed a law providing mill employees liens. On March 5, 1897, he signed into law the creation of a state income tax, and on February 19, 1898, he signed into law segregation of trains in the state. He won the 1898 gubernatorial election, dying during his second term.

== Personal life and death ==
On June 29, 1887, Ellerbe married Henrietta J. Rogers. They had six children together, including politician Earle Rogers Ellerbe and baseball player Frank Ellerbe. He was also the uncle of James Douglass Manning, and the first cousin and brother-in-law of James Haselden Manning. He was a member of the Methodist Episcopal Church, South. He died on June 2, 1899, aged 37, in Sellers, from tuberculosis, and was buried at Haselden Cemetery, in Latta. His funeral was simple, lacking a eulogy.

Party political offices
Preceded by John Gary Evans	Democratic nominee for Governor of South Carolina; 1896, 1898	Succeeded by Miles Benjamin McSweeney
Political offices
Preceded by John Gary Evans	Governor of South Carolina; 1897–1899	Succeeded by Miles Benjamin McSweeney
