= 1890 South Carolina gubernatorial election =

- November 4, 1890
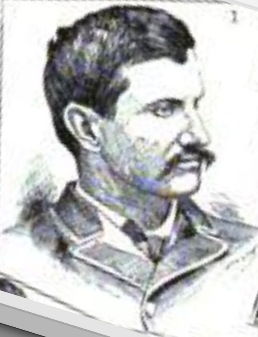

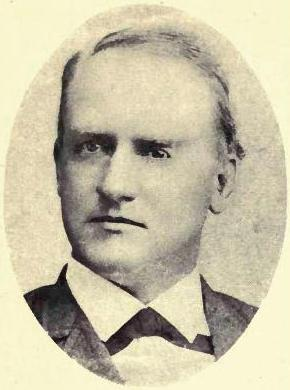
| Nominee | Ben Tillman | A.C. Haskell |
| Party | Democratic | Straightout Democrat |
| Alliance | | Republican |
| Popular vote | 59,159 | 14,828 |
| Percentage | 79.81% | 20.00% |
- County results Tillman: 50–60% 60–70% 70–80% 80–90% 90–100% Haskell: 60–70%
Governor before election
John Peter Richardson III
Democratic
Elected Governor
Benjamin Tillman
Democratic

The 1890 South Carolina gubernatorial election was held in the U.S. state on Tuesday November 4, to elect the governor of South Carolina. Ben Tillman was nominated by the Democrats and easily won the general election against A.C. Haskell to become the 84th governor of South Carolina.

== Farmers' Association Convention ==
In January 1890, the Shell Manifesto was released by the Farmers' Association and it denounced the current Conservative Democratic state government while calling for a convention to be held in March. It was signed by the President of the Farmers' Association, George Washington Shell, but it was written by Ben Tillman who sought to manipulate the Association into supporting his candidacy for governor. The manifesto called for the nomination of candidates for statewide office, with the intent of giving Tillman an early advantage over his Conservative Democrat rivals.

The Farmers' Association convened in Columbia on March 27 and immediately a call was made by W. Jasper Talbert to vote on proceeding with nominations for the statewide ticket. However, the tally from the delegates was 116 votes against nominations and 115 for nominations. Nevertheless, Talbert turned a one-vote defeat into a six-vote victory by switching votes of delegates without their consent and allowing votes of an unseated delegation from Beaufort County. The official vote to proceed with nominations stood at 120 to 114 and Talbert then simply announced the nomination of Tillman for governor without even obtaining a vote from the delegation.

== Democratic Campaign ==
=== Conservative Democrats ===
The Conservatives and the state press condemned the Farmers' Association for trying to disrupt the unity of the state Democratic party. In addition, they stressed that if the Farmers' Associations candidates failed to achieve nomination at the Democratic convention, then their cause would lose all relevancy. Furthermore, the News and Courier conducted a straw poll of over a thousand residents in the state and released the results showing that John Calhoun Sheppard was the most favored candidate for governor, followed by Johnson Hagood and in third was Ben Tillman.

An anti-Tillman farmers convention was organized by the Conservatives and held in Columbia on April 23. Politics remained out of the public discourse at the conference, but discussions were ongoing in private to determine and select the man best to oppose Tillman for governor at the Democratic convention. In the end, they settled on John Bratton because he was a farmer and not a career politician. Many Conservatives disapproved of the choice of Bratton and instead favored either former Governor James L. Orr or Joseph H. Earle. The lack of unity on the part of the Conservatives was troubling as they were facing a formidable opponent in Tillman, who had unified most of the farmers behind his candidacy and was steadily gaining strength in the state.

Aware that Tillman was winning control of the Democratic party organization, the Conservatives pressed for a primary election to select delegates to the state nominating convention. Tillman had long called for primary elections, but he refused to endorse it when he sensed that he had greater strength in the county organization. The executive committee of the state Democratic Party called for a state convention in August to consider it nonetheless.

On July 10, a conference of straightout Democrats led by A.C. Haskell was held in Columbia to discuss a possible primary and how best to defeat Tillman. Among those attending, were Wade Hampton and other leaders of the Democratic Party who had redeemed the state from Radical Republican rule in 1876. A call was issued for the formation of new Democratic clubs in the counties because Tillman's forces had so thoroughly taken over control of the county party machinery. However, despite the best efforts of the Conservatives, they were too late in the game and failed to generate enough support in order to block the election of delegates for Tillman.

=== Democratic Conventions ===
At the August 13 convention called by the state Democratic Executive Committee to consider primary elections, the assembled delegates installed Tillmanites in leadership positions and soundly defeated calls for a primary election. A month later at the nominating convention on September 15, Tillman's supporters had an even greater majority than the preceding convention and Tillman was selected as the governor without opposition.

=== Straightout Democrats ===
Many Democrats resigned to their fate and accepted the choice of Tillman, but a few hardcore Conservatives bolted from the convention to form a Straightout Democrat ticket. They met on October 9 in Columbia and nominated A.C. Haskell as their choice for governor along with a full statewide ticket. The delegates wore red shirts to evoke memories of the Straightout Democrat victory in the 1876 gubernatorial election.

Most of the newspapers in the state disagreed with the decision of the Conservatives to adopt a separate statewide ticket and even Wade Hampton refused to vote for the Straightout ticket. Haskell tried to gain the support of black voters, but they rebuffed his advances because of his harsh methods he used against the blacks in the 1876 campaign. The state Republican party decided to endorse Haskell because Tillman wanted to disfranchise the black voters of the state.

== General election ==
The general election was held on November 4, 1890, and Ben Tillman was elected as governor of South Carolina, only losing the counties of Beaufort and Berkeley to Haskell. Turnout increased for this election over the previous election because it was the first contested general election for governor since the gubernatorial election of 1882.

1890 South Carolina Gubernatorial Election
| Party | Candidate | Votes | % | ±% |
|---|---|---|---|---|
| Democratic | Ben Tillman | 59,159 | 79.81 | −20.2 |
| Straightout Democrat | A.C. Haskell | 14,828 | 20.00 | +20.0 |
| No party | Write-Ins | 137 | 0.18 | +0.2 |
| Majority | | 44,331 | 59.81 | −40.2 |
| Turnout | | 74,124 | | |
| Democratic hold | | | | |

== See also ==
- Governor of South Carolina
- List of governors of South Carolina
- South Carolina gubernatorial elections

| Preceded by 1888 | South Carolina gubernatorial elections | Succeeded by 1892 |
