= 1886 South Carolina gubernatorial election =

1886 South Carolina Democratic convention
- August 4, 1886
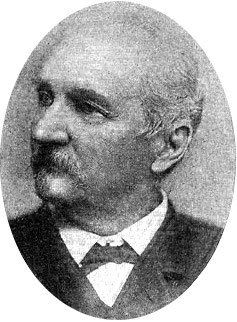

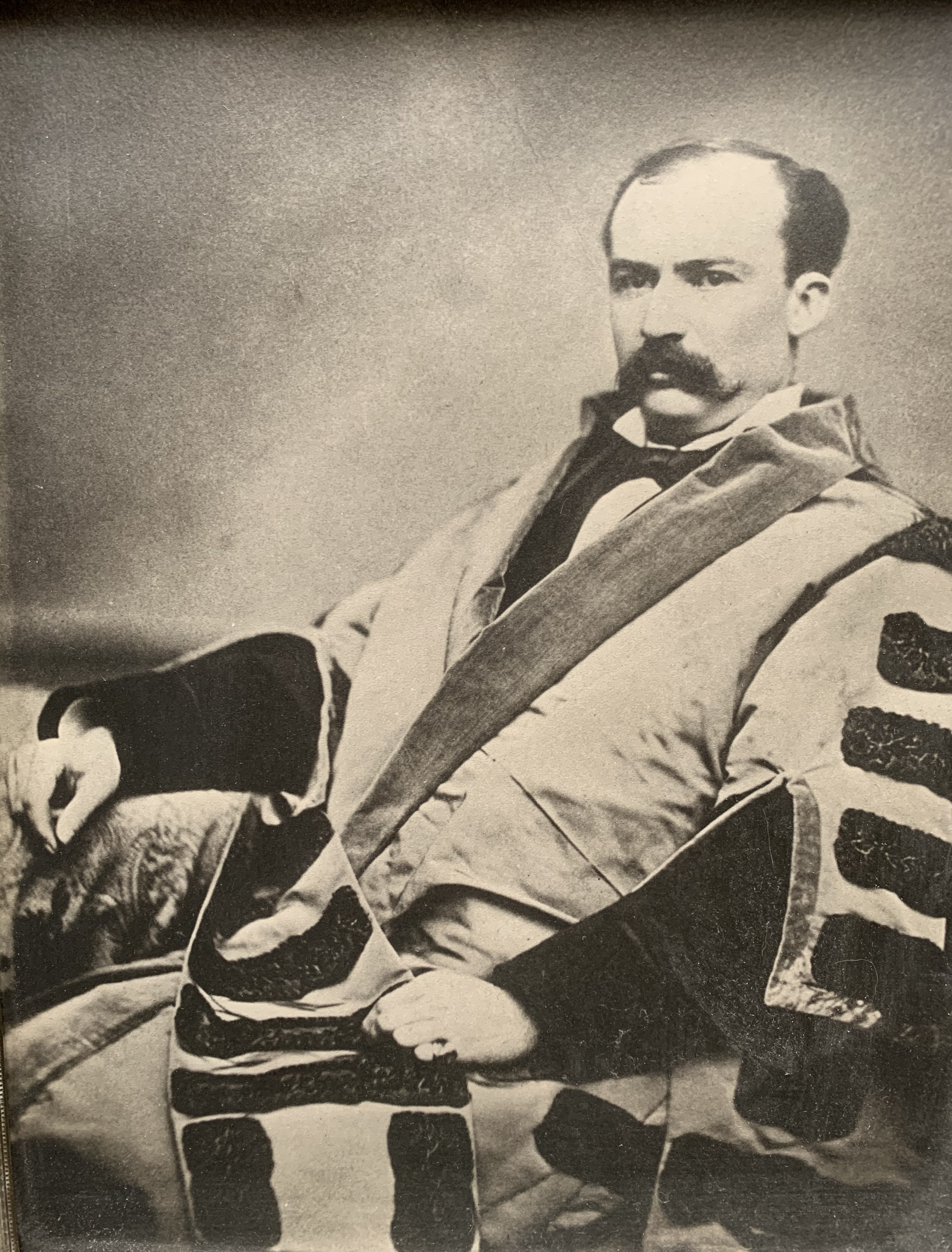
Nominee	John Peter Richardson III	W. C. Coker	John Calhoun Sheppard
Party	Democratic	Democratic	Democratic
Delegate count	172	94	50
Percentage	54.26%	29.65%	15.77%
Governor before election
John Calhoun Sheppard
Democratic
Elected Governor
John Peter Richardson III
Democratic

The 1886 South Carolina gubernatorial election was held on November 2, 1886, to select the governor of the state of South Carolina. John Peter Richardson III was nominated by the Democrats and became the 83rd governor of South Carolina.

== Democratic Convention ==
Democratic nomination for Governor
Candidate	1st Ballot	2nd Ballot	3rd Ballot	
Candidate	1st Ballot	2nd Ballot	1st Call	2nd Call
John Peter Richardson III	112	137	149	172
John Calhoun Sheppard	68	80	78	50
W.C. Coker	48	65	77	94
Giles J. Patterson	36	0	0	0
Edward McCrady	29	15	14	1
W.D. Johnson	25	20	0	0

Ben Tillman, an upstate demagogue, sought to increase his political strength statewide by entering in a union with the editor of The News and Courier, Francis Dawson. They united behind the candidacy of governor John Calhoun Sheppard for reelection, although Sheppard refused to accept Tillman's agriculture program. The News and Courier ran articles leading up to the convention describing the growing strength of Sheppard's campaign and by beginning of the state Democratic convention held in Columbia on August 4, the newspaper had proclaimed that Sheppard was in the lead.

On the morning of August 4, Tillman gathered the delegates from the Democratic convention who were supporters of the Farmers' Association at the Richland County courthouse and tried to bind them to a resolution to support Sheppard. The effort failed and the farmers instead adopted a resolution stating that they would not endorse any candidate for governor.

When it became public that Tillman tried to coerce support for Sheppard, a delegate from Richland County went to the floor after the initial call of the third ballot and changed his vote from Sheppard to John Peter Richardson III, a planter from Clarendon County. Immediately a stampede of other delegates changed their vote and a second call of the third ballot was taken. After this tally, Richardson received 172 votes and was declared the nominee for governor, having passed the required threshold of 159.

== General election ==
The general election was held on November 2, 1886, and John Peter Richardson III was elected as governor of South Carolina without opposition. Being a non-presidential election and few contested races, turnout was the lowest for a gubernatorial election since the election of 1865.

South Carolina Gubernatorial Election, 1886
Party	Candidate	Votes	%	±%
Democratic	John Peter Richardson III	33,114	99.88	−0.1
No party	Write-Ins	40	0.12	+0.1
Majority		33,074	99.76	−0.2
Turnout		33,154		
Democratic hold				

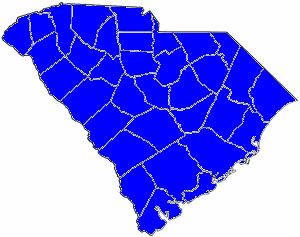
1886 South Carolina gubernatorial election map, by percentile by county. 65+% won by Richardson

== See also ==
- Governor of South Carolina
- List of governors of South Carolina
- South Carolina gubernatorial elections

== Notes ==
Preceded by 1884	South Carolina gubernatorial elections	Succeeded by 1888
