= 1892 South Carolina gubernatorial election =

1892 South Carolina Democratic gubernatorial primary
- August 29, 1892
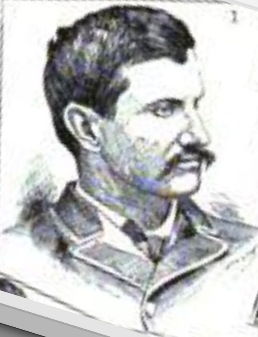

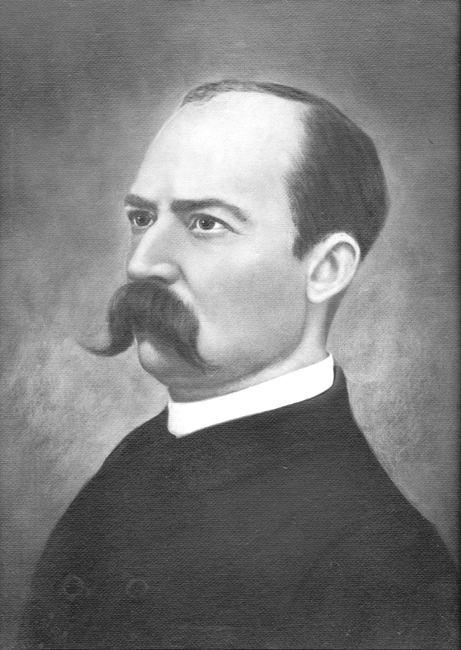
Nominee	Ben Tillman	John Sheppard
Party	Democratic	Democratic
Delegate count	263	56
Popular vote	55,080	32,988
Percentage	62.54%	37.46%
Governor before election
Ben Tillman
Democratic
Elected Governor
Ben Tillman
Democratic

The 1892 South Carolina gubernatorial election was held on November 8, 1892, to select the governor of the state of South Carolina. Governor Ben Tillman was renominated by the Democrats and was elected in the general election to a second two-year term.

== Democratic campaign ==
=== Peace and Harmony convention ===
On March 24 in Columbia, a gathering of conservative Democrats, called the Peace and Harmony convention, plotted strategy for the upcoming gubernatorial election. The conservatives had learnt from their defeat to Tillman in the gubernatorial election of 1890 and realized that it was necessary to give their nominee momentum prior to the canvassing of delegates for the Democratic nominating convention. They also vowed to accept the gubernatorial nominee chosen at the Democratic convention and refrain from running a straightout ticket even if Tillman was to be renominated. Former Governor John Sheppard was nominated by the conservatives. Sheppard, although dignified and respected, possessed none of the demagogic skills of Tillman and therefore would be unable to compete for the votes of the class conscious farmers.

=== Primary to select delegates ===
The conservatives requested a primary to select the nomination of the statewide Democratic ticket instead of the convention system currently being used, but the Tillmanites refused because they were fully in control of the party machinery. Furthermore, the Tillmanites introduced a new rule that blacks could only participate in the selection of delegates if they had ten white men vouch that they voted for Hampton in the gubernatorial election of 1876.

The candidates for governor stumped the state, but there was hardly a peaceful debate. Often, the supporters of both candidates would end up with pistols drawn and threatening violence. Tillman was the chief contributor to this violence and actively supported it among his partisans. He was asked by a close friend why he raised so much hell and Tillman answered "if I didn't, the damn fools wouldn't vote for me."

Sheppard put up a good fight against Tillman, yet fell short by 22,092 votes in the primary on August 29 to select delegates to the state nominating convention. Additionally, the defeat for the conservatives was further magnified by a greater number of Tillmanites being elected from the primary to the General Assembly. Tillman would thus enter his second administration with a renewed popular mandate and a more favorable legislature.

Democratic Primary
Delegates for	Votes	%	Delegates	%
Ben Tillman	55,080	62.5	263	82.4'
John Calhoun Sheppard	32,988	37.5	56	17.6

== General election ==
The general election was held on November 8, 1892, and Ben Tillman was reelected as governor of South Carolina without opposition. Tillman had forced the state Democratic party to adopt the entire Ocala Platform in order to avoid a challenge from the Populist Party. Turnout decreased for this election over the previous election because it was an uncontested election.

South Carolina Gubernatorial Election, 1892
Party	Candidate	Votes	%	±%
Democratic	Ben Tillman (incumbent)	56,673	99.91	+20.1
No party	Write-Ins	52	0.09	−0.1
Majority		56,621	99.82	+40.0
Turnout		56,725		
Democratic hold				

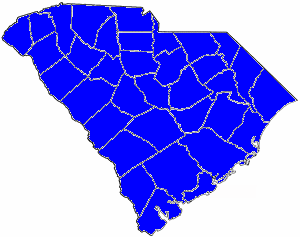
1892 South Carolina gubernatorial election map, by percentile by county. 65+% won by Tillman

== See also ==
- Governor of South Carolina
- List of governors of South Carolina
- South Carolina gubernatorial elections

== Notes ==
Preceded by 1890	South Carolina gubernatorial elections	Succeeded by 1894
