= 1888 South Carolina gubernatorial election =

1888 South Carolina Democratic gubernatorial convention
- November 6, 1888
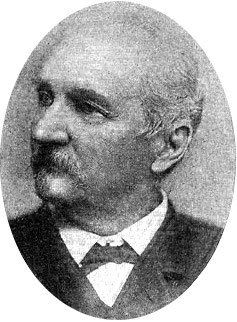

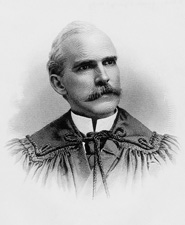
Nominee	John Peter Richardson III	Joseph Haynsworth Earle
Party	Democratic	Democratic
Delegate count	190	116
Percentage	62.09%	37.91%
Governor before election
John Peter Richardson III
Democratic
Elected Governor
John Peter Richardson III
Democratic

The 1888 South Carolina gubernatorial election was held on November 6, 1888, to select the governor of the state of South Carolina. John Peter Richardson III was renominated by the Democrats and was reelected for a second two-year term.

== Democratic Convention ==
Democratic nomination for Governor
Candidate	Votes	%
John Peter Richardson III	190	62.1
Joseph Haynsworth Earle	116	37.9

In 1886, an amendment was added to the constitution of the South Carolina Democratic Party that mandated candidates for Governor and Lieutenant Governor to have at least one meeting in every congressional district with the voters. Benjamin Tillman, an upstate demagogue, engaged Governor Richardson at the meetings in 1888 and soundly trounced him on the stump.

Confident of his support in the state, Tillman sought to name the next governor of South Carolina and told his henchmen to nominate Joseph H. Earle at the Democratic convention. Earle refused the nomination, but Tillman's men nominated him nevertheless stating that "This is a case of the office seeking the man, and not the man seeking the office." A friend of Earle's from Sumter County rose to withdraw his name and Earle's brother declared that Earle would not serve if elected. However, many delegates still voted for Earle and Tillman's growing strength in the Democratic party became evident when his candidate for governor obtained almost 40% of the vote, despite publicly disavowing any candidacy.

== General election ==
The general election was held on November 6, 1888, and John Peter Richardson III was reelected as governor of South Carolina without opposition. There were very few contested races and turnout increased for this election over the previous election solely because of a presidential election on the ballot.

South Carolina Gubernatorial Election, 1888
Party	Candidate	Votes	%	±%
Democratic	John Peter Richardson III (inc.)	58,730	99.97	+0.1
No party	Write-Ins	16	0.03	−0.1
Majority		58,714	99.95	+0.2
Turnout		58,746		
Democratic hold				

== See also ==
- Governor of South Carolina
- List of governors of South Carolina
- South Carolina gubernatorial elections

== Notes ==
Preceded by 1886	South Carolina gubernatorial elections	Succeeded by 1890
