= John Peter Richardson III =

American politician

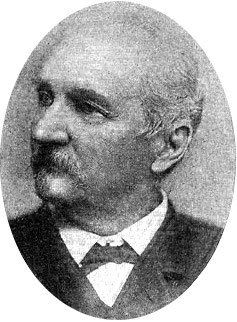

83rd Governor of South Carolina
- In office November 30, 1886 – December 4, 1890
- Lieutenant: William Mauldin
- Preceded by: John Calhoun Sheppard
- Succeeded by: Benjamin Tillman

Treasurer of South Carolina
- In office November 30, 1880 – November 30, 1886
- Governor: Johnson Hagood; Hugh Smith Thompson; John Calhoun Sheppard

Member of the South Carolina Senate from Clarendon County
- In office November 29, 1865 – April 16, 1868

Member of the South Carolina House of Representatives from Clarendon County
- In office November 27, 1865 – November 29, 1865

Member of the South Carolina House of Representatives from Clarendon District
- In office November 24, 1856 – November 24, 1862

Personal details
- Born: John Peter Richardson III; September 25, 1831 Clarendon County, South Carolina, U.S.
- Died: July 6, 1899 (aged 67) Richland County, South Carolina, U.S.
- Resting place: Old Quaker Cemetery
- Party: Democratic
- Spouse: Eleanora Norvell Richardson
- Children: Wilhelmina Willis (Clarkson)
- Education: University of South Carolina
- Profession: Planter, politician

Military service
- Allegiance: Confederate States of America
- Branch/service: Confederate Army
- Battles/wars: American Civil War

John Peter Richardson III (September 25, 1831 – July 6, 1899) was the 83rd governor of South Carolina from 1886 to 1890.

== Family and early life ==
Richardson was born in Clarendon County, South Carolina, to John Peter Richardson II, a former Governor of South Carolina, and Juliana Augusta Manning. After graduating from South Carolina College in 1849, Richardson managed Elmswood Plantation in Clarendon County. He was also elected to the South Carolina House of Representatives during antebellum South Carolina.

== Service in the American Civil War ==
With the outbreak of the American Civil War, Richardson enlisted in the Confederate Army in 1862 and was on the staff of Brigadier General James Cantey until the end of the war. After which, he was elected in 1865 to the South Carolina House of Representatives and later that year to the South Carolina Senate. Richardson was not active in politics during the Reconstruction era, however in 1880 he returned as state Treasurer.

== Term as governor ==
In 1886, Richardson was endorsed by Clarendon County Democrats for the candidacy of governor. The recently formed Farmers' Association has significant influence in Richardson's nomination for candidacy. Richardson won the nomination for governorship, and subsequently went on to win the general election. He was inaugurated as governor on November 30, 1886.

During his second term as governor, Richardson established Clemson College, now known as Clemson University. Richardson initially opposed the creation of Clemson, because he thought that it would siphon funds away from the already existing University of South Carolina. However, he eventually relented in November 1889, when the college was established.

== Death ==
On July 6, 1899, Richardson died in Columbia.

Party political offices
Preceded by Hugh Smith Thompson	Democratic nominee for Governor of South Carolina; 1886, 1888	Succeeded by Benjamin Tillman
Political offices
Preceded by John Calhoun Sheppard	Governor of South Carolina; 1886–1890	Succeeded by Benjamin Tillman
