= John Calhoun Sheppard =

American politician (1850–1931)

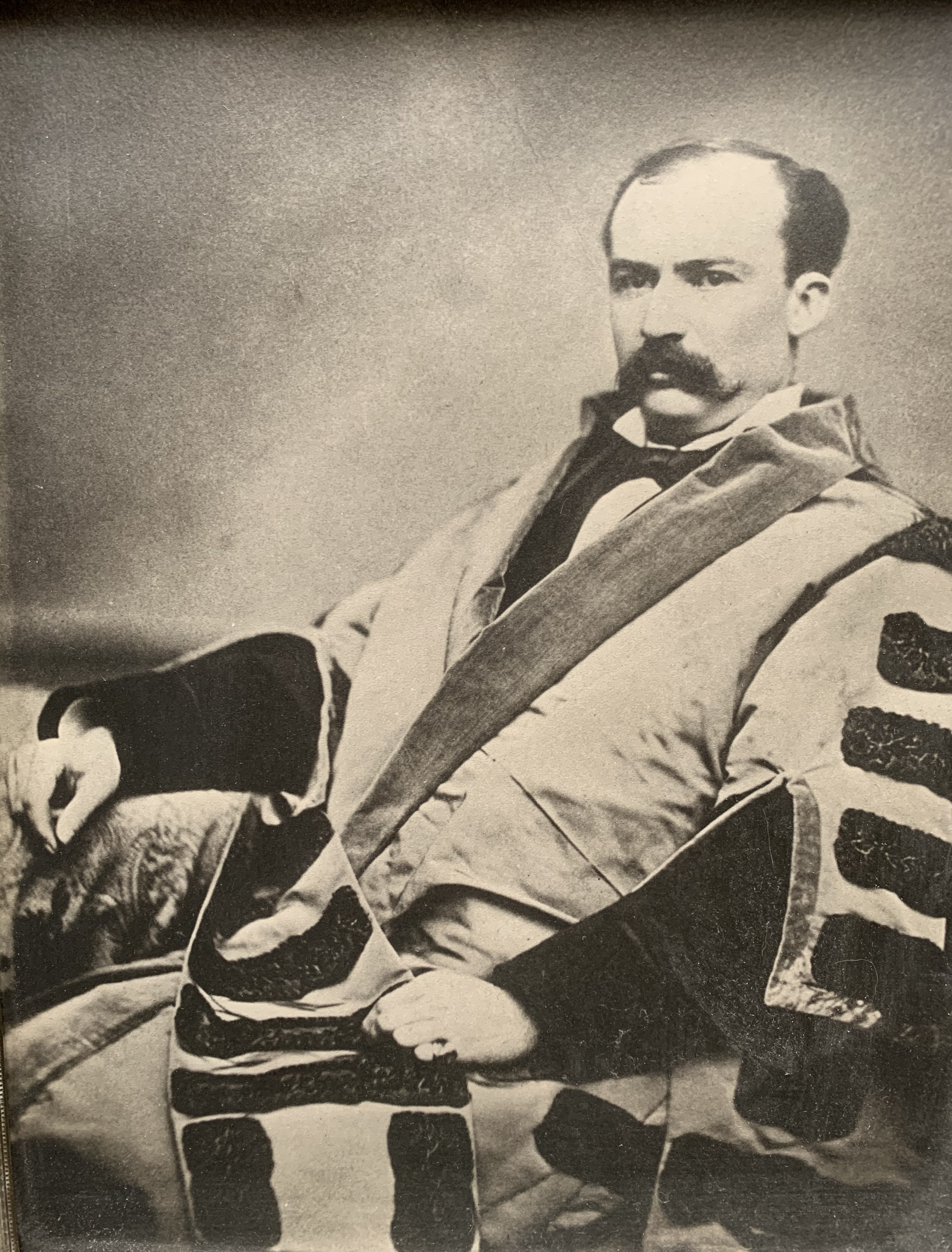

82nd Governor of South Carolina
- In office July 10, 1886 – November 30, 1886
- Lieutenant: Vacant
- Preceded by: Hugh Smith Thompson
- Succeeded by: John Peter Richardson III

President Pro Tempore of the South Carolina Senate
- In office January 9, 1900 – January 10, 1905
- Governor: Miles Benjamin McSweeney; Duncan Clinch Heyward
- Preceded by: Robert Bethea Scarborough
- Succeeded by: Richard Irvine Manning III

Member of the South Carolina Senate from Edgefield County
- In office February 5, 1919 – January 11, 1921
- In office January 10, 1899 – January 10, 1905

58th Lieutenant Governor of South Carolina
- In office December 1, 1882 – July 10, 1886
- Governor: Hugh Smith Thompson
- Preceded by: John D. Kennedy
- Succeeded by: William L. Mauldin

34th Speaker of the South Carolina House of Representatives
- In office December 7, 1877 – December 1, 1882
- Preceded by: William Henry Wallace
- Succeeded by: James Simons Jr.

Member of the South Carolina House of Representatives from Edgefield County
- In office November 28, 1876 – December 1, 1882

Personal details
- Born: July 5, 1850 Edgefield County, South Carolina, US
- Died: October 17, 1931 (aged 81)
- Party: Democratic
- Relatives: Elizabeth Nelson Adams (great granddaughter); Julian Adams II (great great grandson); James Emerson Smith Jr. (great great grandson)

John Calhoun Sheppard (July 5, 1850 – October 17, 1931) was the 82nd governor of South Carolina from July 10, 1886, to November 30, 1886.

== Early life and political career ==
Sheppard was born in Edgefield County and attended Bethel Academy in Edgefield. Upon graduating from Furman University with a law degree, he was admitted to the bar in 1871. He was elected to the South Carolina House of Representatives in 1876 and became the Speaker of the House when his father-in-law, William Henry Wallace, resigned as Speaker to accept an open circuit judgeship. He had been a strong supporter of Martin Witherspoon Gary in his gubernatorial campaign of 1880 which got him noticed by those opposed to the Conservative wing of the state Democratic party.

== Lieutenant Governor and Governor ==
In 1882, Sheppard was placed on the Democratic statewide ticket for the post of Lieutenant Governor and easily won election and reelection in 1884. When Hugh Smith Thompson resigned on July 10, 1886, to be Assistant Secretary of the Treasury, Sheppard succeeded to the governorship. In the nomination battle to be the Democratic nominee for governor in the election of 1886, he was promoted by Benjamin Tillman and the News and Courier. Tillman tried to force the delegates of the Farmers' Association to support Sheppard at the Democratic Convention, but they refused. Instead, John Peter Richardson III emerged as the nominee for governor.

== Later political activities ==
After leaving the governorship on November 30, 1886, Sheppard became president of the Edgefield Bank of South Carolina. He was mentioned as a potential candidate for governor in 1890, but Tillman had rigged the Democratic convention to force his nomination for governor. Sheppard remained active in South Carolina politics and participated at the constitutional convention of 1895. He was elected three years later in 1898 to the South Carolina Senate and served until 1904. In 1908, Sheppard was the president of the South Carolina Bar Association and was member of the state Senate for a second time from 1919 to 1920.

== Death ==
Sheppard died on October 17, 1931, aged 81. He was buried at Willowbrook Cemetery in Edgefield.

Political offices
Preceded by John D. Kennedy	Lieutenant Governor of South Carolina; 1882–1886	Succeeded by William L. Mauldin
Preceded by Hugh Smith Thompson	Governor of South Carolina; 1886	Succeeded by John Peter Richardson III
