= Benjamin Tillman =

American politician (1847–1918)

Ben Tillman
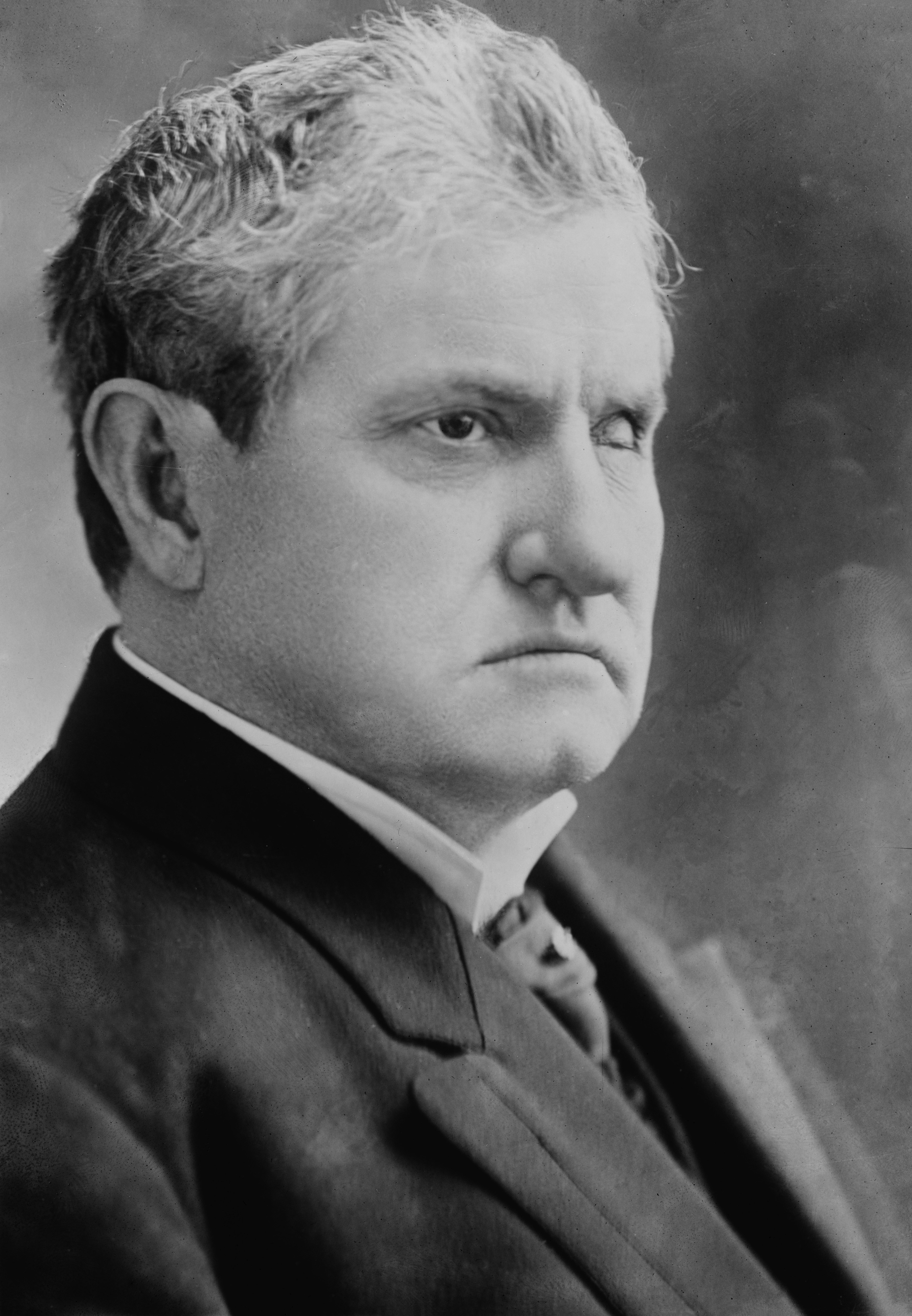
- Tillman in c. 1910

United States Senator from South Carolina
- In office March 4, 1895 – July 3, 1918
- Preceded by: Matthew Butler
- Succeeded by: Christie Benet

84th Governor of South Carolina
- In office December 4, 1890 – December 4, 1894
- Lieutenant: Eugene B. Gary (1890–1893); Washington H. Timmerman (1893–1894)
- Preceded by: John Peter Richardson III
- Succeeded by: John Gary Evans

Personal details
- Born: Benjamin Ryan Tillman Jr. August 11, 1847 Trenton, South Carolina, U.S.
- Died: July 3, 1918 (aged 70) Washington, D.C., U.S.
- Party: Democratic
- Spouse: Sallie Starke (m. 1868)
- Children: 7
- Relatives: George Dionysius Tillman (brother); James H. Tillman (nephew)

Benjamin Ryan Tillman (August 11, 1847 – July 3, 1918) was an American Democratic Party politician who served as governor of South Carolina from 1890 to 1894, and as a United States Senator from 1895 until his death in 1918. A white supremacist who opposed civil rights for black Americans, Tillman led a paramilitary group of Red Shirts during South Carolina's violent 1876 election. On the floor of the U.S. Senate, he defended lynching, and frequently ridiculed black Americans in his speeches, boasting of having helped kill them during that campaign.

In the 1880s, Tillman, a wealthy landowner, became dissatisfied with the Democratic leadership and led a movement of white farmers calling for reform. He was initially unsuccessful, though he was instrumental in the founding of Clemson University as an agricultural land-grant college. In 1890, Tillman took control of the state Democratic Party, and was elected governor. During his four years in office, 18 black Americans were lynched in South Carolina; in the 1890s, the state had its highest number of lynchings of any decade. Tillman tried to prevent lynchings as governor but also spoke in support of the lynch mobs, alleging his own willingness to lead one. In 1894, at the end of his second two-year term, he was elected to the U.S. Senate by vote of the state legislature, who elected senators at the time.

Tillman was known as "Pitchfork Ben" because of his aggressive language, such as when he threatened to use a pitchfork to prod that "bag of beef", referring to President Grover Cleveland. Considered a possible candidate for the Democratic nomination for president in 1896, Tillman lost any chance after giving a disastrous speech at the convention. He became known for his virulent oratory—especially against black Americans—but also for his effectiveness as a legislator. The first federal campaign finance law, banning corporate contributions, is commonly called the Tillman Act. Tillman was repeatedly re-elected, serving in the Senate for the rest of his life. One of his legacies was South Carolina's 1895 constitution, which disenfranchised most of the black majority and many poor whites, and ensured white Democratic Party rule for more than six decades into the 20th century.

== Early life and education ==
Benjamin Ryan Tillman Jr. was born on August 11, 1847, on the family plantation "Chester", near Trenton, in the Edgefield District, (Note: The district included today's Edgefield County, where Trenton is located.) sometimes considered part of upcountry South Carolina. His parents, Benjamin Ryan Tillman Sr. and the former Sophia Hancock, were of English descent. In addition to being planters with 86 slaves, the Tillmans operated an inn. They owned 2,500 acres of land and were among the largest slaveholders in the district. Benjamin Jr. was the last-born of seven sons and four daughters.

The Edgefield District was known as a violent place, even by the standards of antebellum South Carolina, where matters of personal honor might be addressed with a killing or duel. Before Tillman Sr.'s death from typhoid fever in 1849, he had killed a man and been convicted of rioting by an Edgefield jury. One of his sons died in a duel; another was killed in a domestic dispute. A third died in the Mexican–American War; a fourth at the age of 15 from disease. Of Benjamin Jr.'s two surviving brothers, one died of Civil War wounds after returning home, and the other, George, killed a man who accused him of cheating at gambling. Convicted of manslaughter, George continued to practice law from his jail cell during his two-year sentence, and was elected to the state senate while still incarcerated. He later served several terms in Congress.

From an early age, Ben showed a developed vocabulary. In 1860, he was sent to Bethany, a boarding school in Edgefield where he became a star student, and he remained there after the American Civil War began. In 1863, he came home for a year to help his mother pay off debts. He returned to Bethany in 1864, intending a final year of study prior to entering the South Carolina College (today, the University of South Carolina). The South's desperate need for soldiers ended this plan. In June 1864, not yet 17, Tillman withdrew from the academy, making arrangements to join a coastal artillery unit. These plans were scuttled as well when he fell ill at home. A cranial tumor required the removal of his left eye. It was not until 1866, months after Confederate forces had disbanded, that Ben Tillman was again healthy.

After the war, Ben Tillman, his mother, and his wounded brother James (who died in 1866) worked to rebuild Chester plantation. They signed the plantation's freedmen as workers. They were confronted with the circumstance of several men refusing to work for them and legally leaving the plantation. From 1866 to 1868, Ben Tillman went with several workers from the plantation to Florida, where a new cotton cultivation belt had been established. The Tillmans purchased land there. Tillman was unsuccessful in Florida: after two marginal years, the 1868 crop was destroyed by caterpillars.

During his convalescence, Tillman had met Sallie Starke, a refugee from Fairfield District. They married in January 1868 and she joined him in Florida. The Tillmans returned to South Carolina, where the following year they settled on 430 acres (170 ha) of Tillman family land, given to him by his mother. They would have seven children together: Adeline, Benjamin Ryan, Henry Cummings, Margaret Malona, Sophia Oliver, Samuel Starke, and Sallie Mae.

Though he was not very religious, Tillman was a frequent churchgoer as a young adult. He was a Christian, but did not identify with a particular sect; as a result, he never formally joined a church. His religious skepticism also led to his avoidance of any further churchgoing almost immediately following his becoming a politician.

Tillman proved an adept farmer, who experimented with crop diversification and took his crops to market each Saturday in nearby Augusta, Georgia. In 1878, Tillman inherited 170 acres (69 ha) from Sophia Tillman, and purchased 650 acres (260 ha) at Ninety Six, some 30 miles (48 km) from his Edgefield holdings. Having inherited a large library from his uncle John Tillman, he spent part of his days reading.

Although his workers were no longer slaves, Tillman continued to apply the whip to them. By 1876, Tillman was the largest landowner in Edgefield County. He rode through his fields on horseback like an antebellum overseer, and stated at the time that it was necessary that he do so to "drive the slovenly Negroes to work".

== Red Shirts and Reconstruction ==
=== Resistance to Republican rule ===
With the Confederacy defeated, South Carolina ratified a new constitution in 1865 that recognized the end of slavery, but basically left the pre-war elites in charge. African-American freedmen, who were the majority of South Carolina's population, were given no vote, and their new freedom was soon restricted by Black Codes that limited their civil rights and required black farm laborers to bind themselves with annual labor contracts. Congress was dissatisfied with this minimal change and required a new constitutional convention and elections with universal male suffrage. As African Americans generally favored the Republican Party at the time, their votes resulted in that party controlling the biracial state legislature beginning with the 1868 elections. That campaign was marked by violence; 19 Republican and Union League activists were killed in South Carolina's 3rd congressional district alone.

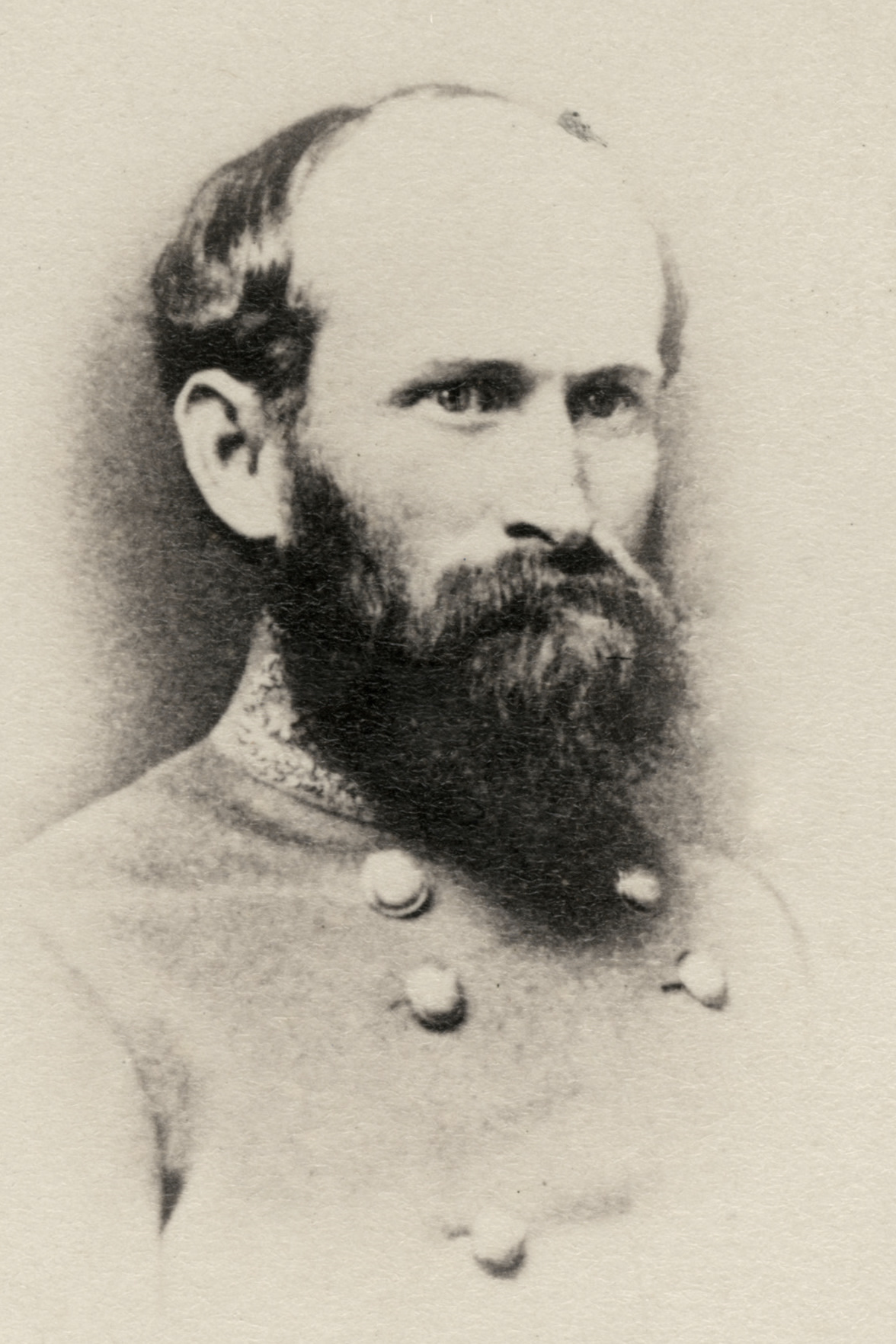
Martin Witherspoon Gary

In 1873, two Edgefield lawyers and former Confederate generals, Martin Gary and Matthew C. Butler, began to advocate what became known as the "Edgefield Plan" or "Straightout Plan". They believed that the previous five years had shown it was not possible to outvote African Americans. Gary and Butler deemed compromises with black leaders to be misguided; they believed that white men must be restored to their antebellum position of preeminent political power in the state. They proposed that white men form clandestine paramilitary organizations—known as "rifle clubs"—and use force and intimidation to drive African Americans from power. Members of the new white groups became known as Red Shirts. Tillman was an early and enthusiastic recruit for his local organization, dubbed the Sweetwater Sabre Club. He became a devoted protégé of Gary.

From 1873 to 1876, Tillman served as a member of the Sweetwater club, members of which assaulted and intimidated black would-be voters, killed black political figures, and skirmished with the African-American-dominated state militia. Economic coercion was used as well as physical force: most Edgefield planters would not employ black militiamen or allow them to rent land, and ostracized whites who did.

=== Hamburg massacre; campaign of 1876 ===
In 1874, a moderate Republican, Daniel Henry Chamberlain, was elected South Carolina's governor, attracting even some Democratic votes. When Chamberlain sought re-election in 1876, Gary recruited Wade Hampton III, a Confederate war hero who had moved out of state, to return and run for governor as a Democrat. That election campaign of 1876 was marked by violence, of which the most notorious occurrence was what became known as the Hamburg massacre. It occurred in Hamburg, a mostly black town across the Savannah River from Augusta, in Aiken County, bordering Edgefield County. The incident grew out of a confrontation on July 4 when a black militia marched in Hamburg and two white farmers in a buggy tried to ride through its ranks. Both sides filed criminal charges against the other, and dozens of armed out-of-uniform Red Shirts, led by Butler, traveled to Hamburg on the day of the hearing, July 8. Tillman was present, and the subsequent events were among his proudest memories.

The hearing never occurred, as the black militiamen, outnumbered and outgunned, refused to attend court. This upset the white mob, which expected an apology. Butler demanded that the militiamen give one, and as part of the apology, surrender their arms. Those who attempted to mediate found that neither Butler nor the armed men who backed him were interested in compromise. If the militiamen surrendered their arms, they would be helpless before the mob; if they did not, Butler and his men would use force. Butler brought additional men in from Georgia, and the augmented armed mob, including Tillman, went to confront the militiamen, who were barricaded in their drill room, above a local store. Shots were fired, and after one white man was killed, the rest stormed the room and captured about thirty of the militia. Five were murdered as having white enemies; among the dead was a town constable who had arrested white men. The rest were allowed to flee, with shots fired after them. At least seven black militiamen were killed in the incident. On the way home to Edgefield, Tillman and others had a meal to celebrate the events at the home of the man who had pointed out which African Americans should be shot.

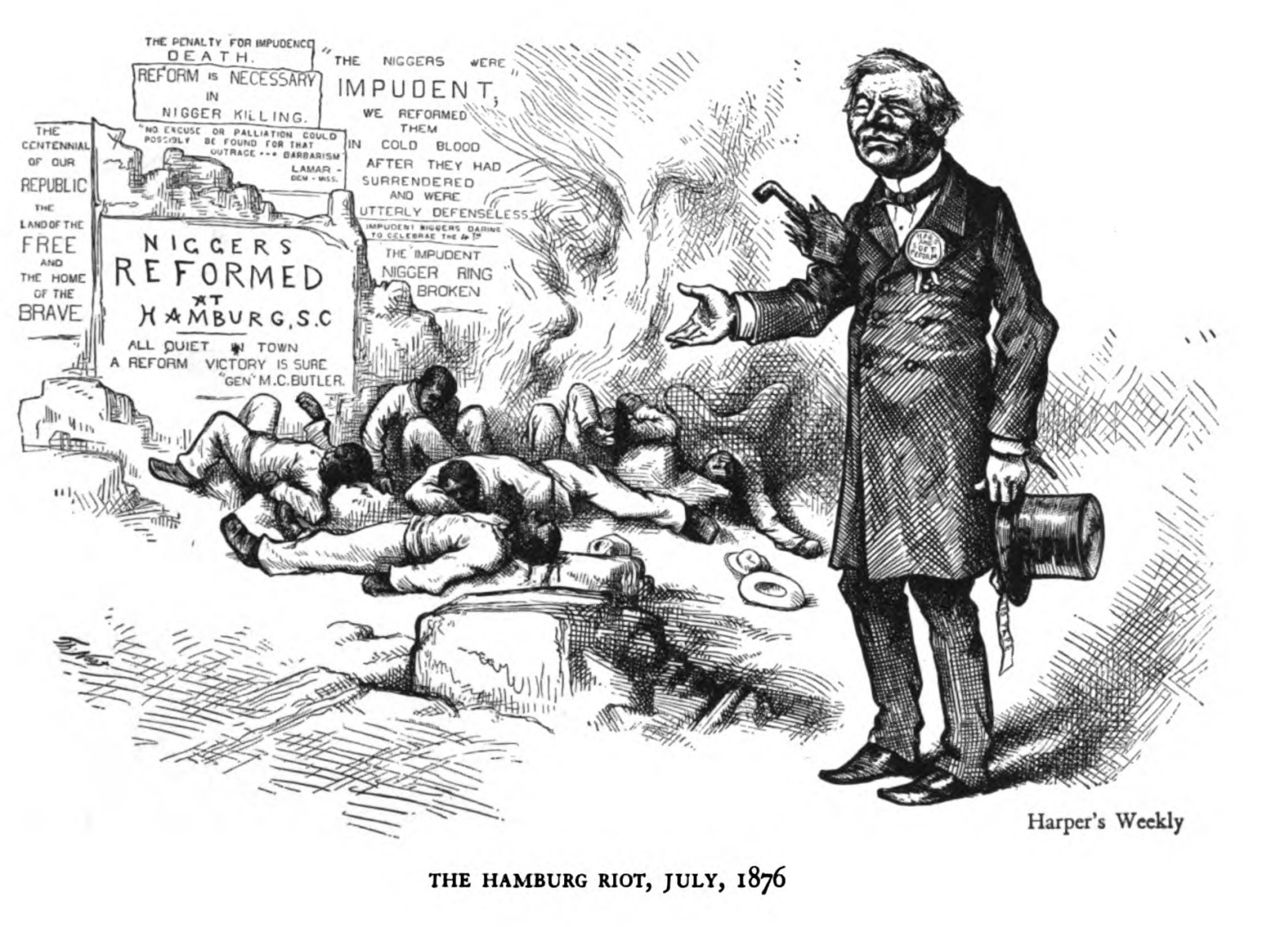
Harper's Weekly cartoon decrying the Hamburg massacre

Tillman later recalled that "the leading white men of Edgefield" had decided "to seize the first opportunity that the Negroes might offer them to provoke a riot and teach the Negroes a lesson" by "having the whites demonstrate their superiority by killing as many of them as was justifiable". Hamburg was their first such opportunity. Ninety-four white men, including Tillman, were indicted by a coroner's jury, but none was prosecuted for the killings. Butler blamed the deaths on intoxicated factory workers and Irish-Americans who had come across the bridge from Augusta, and over whom he had no control.

Tillman raised his profile in state politics by attending the 1876 state Democratic convention, which nominated Hampton as the party's candidate for governor. While Hampton presented a fatherly image, urging support from South Carolinians, black and white, Tillman led fifty men to Ellenton, intending to join more than one thousand rifle club members who slaughtered thirty militiamen, with the survivors saved only by the arrival of federal authorities. Although Tillman and his men arrived too late to participate in those killings, two of his men murdered Simon Coker, a black state senator who had come to investigate reports of violence. They shot him as he knelt in final prayer.

On Election Day in November 1876, Tillman served as an election official at a local poll, as did two black Republicans. One arrived late and was scared off by Tillman. As there was as yet no secret ballot in South Carolina, Tillman threatened to remember any votes cast for the Republicans. That precinct gave 211 votes for the Democrats and 2 for the Republicans. Although almost two-thirds of those eligible to vote in Edgefield were African Americans, the Democrats were able to suppress the (Republican) African-American vote, reporting a win for Hampton in Edgefield County with over 60 percent of the vote. Bolstered by this result, Hampton gained a narrow victory statewide, at least according to the official returns. The Red Shirts used violence and fraud to create Democratic majorities that did not exist, and give Hampton the election.

Tillman biographer Stephen Kantrowitz wrote that the unrest in 1876 "marked a turning point in Ben Tillman's life, establishing him as a member of the political and military leadership". Historian Orville Vernon Burton stated that the violence "secured his prominence among the state's white political elite and proved to be the deathblow to South Carolina's Republican Reconstruction government." The takeover, by fraud and terror, of South Carolina's government became known to whites as the state's "Redemption".

In 1909, Tillman addressed a reunion of Red Shirts in Anderson, South Carolina, and recounted the events of 1876:

The purpose of our visit to Hamburg was to strike terror, and the next morning (Sunday) when the negroes who had fled to the swamp returned to the town (some of them never did return, but kept on going) the ghastly sight which met their gaze of seven dead negroes lying stark and stiff, certainly had its effect ... It was now after midnight, and the moon high in the heavens looked down peacefully on the deserted town and dead negroes, whose lives had been offered up as a sacrifice to the fanatical teachings and fiendish hate of those who sought to substitute the rule of the African for that of the Caucasian in South Carolina.

== "Agricultural Moses" ==
Starting with the election of Hampton as governor in 1876, South Carolina was ruled primarily by the wealthy "Bourbon" or "Conservative" planter class that had controlled the state before the Civil War. In the 1880s, though, the Bourbon class was neither as strong nor as populous as before. The agenda of the Conservatives had little to offer the farmer, and in the hard economic times of the early 1880s, there was discontent in South Carolina that led to some electoral success for the short-lived Greenback Party.

Having risen to the rank of captain in the rifle club before the end of the 1876 campaign, Tillman spent the next several years managing his plantations. He played a modest role in Edgefield's political and social life, and in 1881 was elected second in command of the Edgefield Hussars, a rifle club that had been made part of the state militia. He supported Gary's unsuccessful candidacy for the Democratic nomination for governor in 1880, and after Gary's death in 1881, as a delegate to the 1882 Democratic state convention Tillman backed former Confederate general John Bratton for the nomination, again unsuccessfully. By then, Tillman was dissatisfied with the Conservative leaders he had helped gain power; he believed they were ignoring the interests of farmers and of poor mill workers, and had been responsible for denying office to Gary—the former Red Shirt leader had twice sought to be senator, and once governor, and was each time denied. Tillman never forgot what he deemed the "betrayal" of Gary.

=== Struggle for the farmer ===
In an attempt to better conditions for the farmer (by which Tillman always meant white males only), in 1884 he founded the Edgefield Agricultural Club. It died for lack of members. Undeterred, Tillman tried again in January 1885, beginning the Edgefield County Agricultural Society. Its membership also dwindled, but Tillman was elected one of three delegates to the August joint meeting of the state Grange and the state Agricultural and Mechanical Society at Bennettsville, and was invited to be one of the speakers.

When Tillman spoke at Bennettsville, he was not widely known except as the brother of Congressman George Tillman. Ben Tillman called for the state government to do more for farmers, and blamed politicians and lawyers in the pay of financial interests for agricultural problems, including the crop lien system that left many farmers struggling to pay bills. He assailed his listeners for letting themselves be duped by hostile interests, and told of the farmer who was elected to the legislature, only to be dazzled and seduced by the elite. According to an account the next day in the Columbia Daily Register, Tillman's speech "electrified the assembly and was the sensation of the meeting". Lindsey Perkins, in his journal article on Tillman's oratory, wrote that "Tillman's losses in the agricultural depression of 1883–1898 forced him to begin thinking and planning economic reforms. The result was Bennettsville." Tillman later stated that he began his advocacy after a few bad years in the early 1880s forced him to sell some of his land. The speech was printed in several newspapers, and Tillman began to receive more invitations to speak. According to Zach McGhee in his 1906 article on Tillman, "from that day to this he has been the most conspicuous figure in South Carolina".

Within two months of the Bennettsville speech, Tillman was being talked of as a candidate for governor in 1886. He continued to speak to audiences, and was dubbed the "Agricultural Moses". He made political demands, such as primary elections to determine who would get the Democratic nomination (then tantamount to election) rather than the leaving the decision to the Bourbon-dominated state nominating convention. He principally promoted the establishment of a state college for the education of farmers, where young men could learn the latest techniques. Kantrowitz pointed out that the term "farmer" is flexible in meaning, allowing Tillman to overlook distinctions of class and unite most white men in predominantly rural South Carolina under a single banner. During these years, cartoonists began depicting Tillman with pitchfork in hand, symbolizing his agriculture-based roots and tendency to take jabs at opponents. This was a source of his nickname, "Pitchfork Ben".

Historian H. Wayne Morgan noted that "Ben Tillman's venom was not typical, but his general feeling represented that of southern dirt farmers." According to E. Culpepper Clark in his journal article on Tillman,

Tillman constantly baffled his enemies. Every move he made seemed sure to be counterproductive; yet his popularity only grew ... he abused his followers, calling them ignorant, imbecilic, backward, apathetic, and foolish. He assailed his enemies with a tongue so outrageous that many believed only the demise of the code duello kept him alive ... Despite all this, his movement grew and multiplied, thriving best when the issues appeared contrived, contradictory or without foundation.

Tillman spoke widely in the state in 1885 and after, and soon attracted allies, including a number of Red Shirt comrades, such as Martin Gary's nephews Eugene B. Gary and John Gary Evans. He sought to mold local farmers' groups into a statewide organization to be a voice for agriculturalists. In April 1886, a convention called by Tillman met in Columbia, the state capital. The goal of what became known as the Farmer's Association or Farmer's Movement was to control the state Democratic Party from within, and to gain reforms such as the agricultural college. He initially was unsuccessful, though he came within thirty votes of controlling the 1886 state Democratic convention. The lack of success caused Tillman, in late 1887, to announce his retirement from politics, though there was widespread speculation he would soon be back.

Tillman had met, in 1886, with Thomas G. Clemson, son-in-law of the late John C. Calhoun, to discuss a bequest to underwrite the cost of the new agricultural school. Clemson died in 1888, and his will not only left money and land for the college, but made Tillman one of seven trustees for life, who had the power to appoint their successors. Tillman stated that this provision, which made the lifetime trustees a majority of the board, was intended to forestall any attempt by a future Republican government to admit African Americans. Clemson College (later Clemson University) was authorized by the legislature in December 1888.

The Clemson bequest helped revitalize Tillman's movement. The targets of Tillman's oratory were again politicians in Columbia and the Conservative elements based in Charleston and elsewhere in the lowcountry of South Carolina. Through letters to newspapers and stump speeches, he decried the state government as a pit of corruption, stating that officials displayed "ignorance, extravagance and laziness" and that Charleston's The Citadel was a "military dude factory" that might profitably be repurposed as a school for women.

Governor John P. Richardson had been elected in 1886; in 1888 he sought re-nomination, to be met with opposition from Tillman's farmers. As had been done to Republican rallies in 1876, Tillman and his followers attended campaign events and demanded that he be allowed equal time to speak. Tillman was a highly talented stump speaker, and when given the opportunity to debate, accused Richardson of being irreligious, a gambler and a drunkard. Even so, Richardson was easily re-nominated by the state Democratic convention, which turned down Tillman's demand for a primary election. Tillman proposed the customary gracious motion that Richardson's nomination be made unanimous.

=== 1890 gubernatorial campaign ===
One factor that helped Tillman and his movement in the 1890 campaign was the organization of many South Carolina farmers under the auspices of the Farmers' Alliance. The Alliance, which had spread through much of the agricultural South and West since its origin in Texas, sought to get farmers to work together cooperatively and seek reform. From that organization would come the People's Party (better known as the Populists). Although the Populist Party played a significant role in the politics of the 1890s, it did not do so in South Carolina, where Tillman had already channeled agricultural discontent into an attempt to take over the Democratic Party. The Alliance in South Carolina generally backed Tillman, and its many local farmers' organizations gave Tillman new venues for his speeches.

In January 1890, Tillmanite leader George Washington Shell published what came to be known as the "Shell Manifesto" in a Charleston newspaper, setting forth the woes of farmers under the Conservative government, and calling for them to elect delegates to meet in March to recommend a candidate for governor. Both Tillman supporters and Conservatives realized the purpose was to pre-empt the Democratic convention's choice, and fresh, acrimonious debate over the merits of Tillman and his methods began. He and his supporters were often attacked in the newspapers by the Conservatives, but such invective by the hated elites only tended to endear Tillman the more to the farmers who saw him as their champion. Conservatives were certain that once Tillman's voters understood how wealthy he was while speaking for debt-ridden farmers, they would abandon him; they did not.

At the "Shell Convention", state Representative John L. M. Irby nominated Tillman, stating "shame on the [Democratic] party for stabbing Gary, a man who had saved us in '76 ... we could now make the amends honorable and choose B. R. Tillman". Although many delegates voted to make no endorsement, Tillman gained a narrow victory for the convention's recommendation. Tillman spent the summer of 1890 making speeches and debating two rivals (former general Bratton and state Attorney General Joseph H. Earle) for the nomination, as the Democratic leadership watched with increasing consternation. Given Tillman's strength at the grassroots level, he was likely to be the choice of the Democratic convention in September. Accordingly, the party's Bourbon-controlled state executive committee tried to use the brief August convention (called to set the rules for the September one) to change the nomination method to a primary, in which the anti-Tillman forces would unite behind a single candidate. When the August convention was held, the Tillmanites had a large majority, which they used to oust the executive committee and install one loyal to Tillman. The convention also passed a new party constitution calling for a primary, beginning in 1892. Tillman was duly nominated in September as the Democratic candidate for governor, with Eugene Gary as his running mate for lieutenant governor.

After the convention many Conservative Democrats, though not happy at Tillman's victory, acknowledged him as head of the state party. Those who submitted to Tillman's rule included Hampton and Butler, the state's two U.S. senators. In his campaign, Tillman promoted support for Clemson, establishment of a state women's college, reapportionment of the state legislature (then dominated by the lowcountry counties), and ending the influence of corporation lawyers in that body.

Those Democrats who could not abide Tillman's candidacy held an October meeting with 20 of South Carolina's 35 counties represented, and nominated Alexander Haskell for governor. The announcement that Haskell would run caused a closing of Democratic ranks against him, lest white unity be sundered. The Charleston News and Courier, not always a friend to Tillman, urged, "stand by the ticket, not for the ticket's sake, but for the party and the State". Even most Conservatives would not support a bolt from the party, and Kantrowitz suggested that Haskell and his supporters hated Tillman so much that his nomination caused them to commit political suicide. The Haskell campaign reached out to black voters, pledging that he would not disturb the limited political role played by African Americans in the state, a promise Tillman was unlikely to make.

During Tillman's five years of agricultural advocacy, he had rarely discussed the question of the African American. With blacks given control of one of South Carolina's seven congressional districts, the question of black influence in state politics seemed settled and did not play a significant role in the campaign for the Democratic nomination for governor. Haskell's appeals for support, added to speculation that Tillman was trying to form a biracial coalition through the Farmers' Alliance (which, though segregated, had a parallel organization for black farmers) made race an issue. Tillman boasted of his deeds at Hamburg and Ellenton, but it was Gary who made race the focus of his campaign. Urging segregation of railroad cars, Gary asked, "what white man wants his wife or sister sandwiched between a big bully buck and a saucy wench"?

Although Tillman fully expected to win, he warned that should he be defeated by ballot-box stuffing, there would be war. On Election Day, November 4, 1890, Tillman was elected governor with 59,159 votes to 14,828 for Haskell. With no Republican to support (none had run for governor since 1878), black leaders had been divided as to whether to endorse Haskell; in the end the only two counties won by him were in the lowcountry and heavily African-American. The losing candidate and his white supporters were quickly consigned to political oblivion, with some mocking them as "white Negroes".

== Governor (1890–1894) ==
=== Inauguration and legislative control ===
Tillman was sworn in as governor in Columbia on December 4, 1890, before a crowd of jubilant supporters, the largest to see South Carolina's governor inaugurated since Hampton's swearing-in. In his inaugural address, Tillman celebrated his victory, "the citizens of this great commonwealth have for the first time in its history demanded and obtained for themselves the right to choose her Governor; and I, as the exponent and leader of the revolution which brought about the change, am here to take the solemn oath of office ... the triumph of democracy and white supremacy over mongrelism and anarchy, of civilization over barbarism, has been most complete."

Tillman made it clear he was not content that African Americans were allowed even a limited role in the political life of South Carolina:

The whites have absolute control of the State government, and we intend at any and all hazards to retain it. The intelligent exercise of the right of suffrage ... is as yet beyond the capacity of the vast majority of colored men. We deny, without regard to color, that "all men are created equal"; it is not true now, and was not true when Jefferson wrote it.

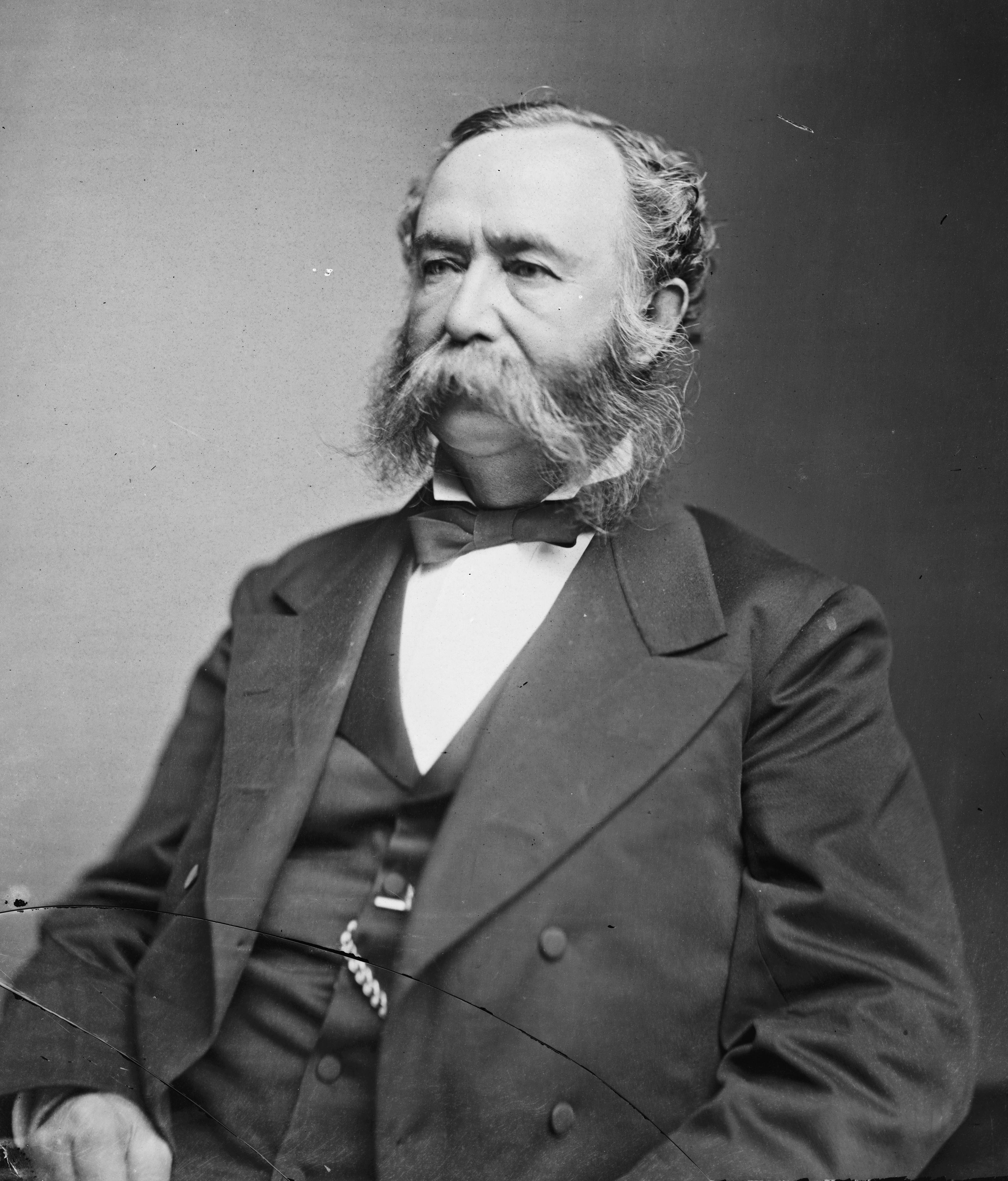
Wade Hampton III

The legislature, at Tillman's recommendation, reapportioned itself, costing Charleston County four of its twelve seats, and other lowcountry counties one each, with the seats going to the upcountry. Although Tillman sought to reduce public expenditures, he was not successful in doing so as his reform program required spending, and the legislature could find few savings to make. Construction of Clemson College was slowed, and subsidies for fairs were cut.

Among the matters before the new, Tillman-controlled legislature was who should fill the Senate seat held by Hampton, whose term expired in March 1891—until 1913, state legislatures elected senators. There was a call from many in the South Carolina Democratic Party to re-elect Hampton, who had played a major role in the state for the past thirty years, in war and peace. Tillman was embittered against Hampton for a number of slights, including the senator's neutrality in the race against Haskell. The legislature retired Hampton, who received only 43 of 157 votes, and sent Irby to Washington in his place. The ouster of Hampton was controversial, and remained so for decades afterwards; according to Simkins (writing in 1944), "to future generations of South Carolinians, Tillman's act was a ruthless violation of cherished traditions of which Hampton was a living symbol".

=== Policies and events as governor ===
==== Lynching and race ====
Tillman as governor initially took a strong stand against lynching. The Shell Manifesto, in reciting the ills of Conservative government, had blamed the Bourbons for encouraging lynching through bad laws and poor administration. Although Governor Richardson, Tillman's predecessor, had taken action to prevent such murders, they still occurred, with no one being prosecuted for them. In about half of the lynchings in South Carolina between 1881 and 1895, there were claims that the black victim had raped or tried to rape a white woman. More lynchings took place in South Carolina in the 1890s than in any other decade, and in Edgefield and several other counties, such killings outnumbered lawful executions.

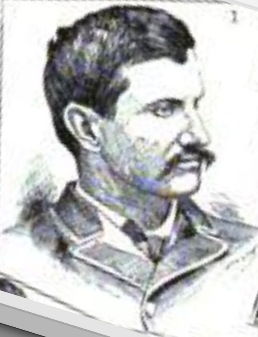
Tillman in 1892

During Tillman's first year in office there were no lynchings, compared with 12 in Richardson's last year, which Simkins attributed to Tillman's "vigorous attitude towards law enforcement". Tillman called out the militia multiple times to prevent lynchings, and corresponded with sheriffs, passing along information and rumors of contemplated lynchings. The governor pressed for a law requiring the segregation of railroad cars: opposed by railroad companies and the few black legislators, the bill passed the state House of Representatives but failed in the Senate. Tillman's calls to redistrict away the one congressional district dominated by African Americans, and for a constitutional convention to disenfranchise them also fell in the Senate, where the convention proposal failed to attract the necessary two-thirds majority. The only enactment that struck at the African American in Tillman's first term imposed a prohibitive tax on labor agents, who were recruiting local farm hands to move out of state.

In December 1891, soon after the first anniversary of Tillman's taking office, a black Edgefield man named Dick Lundy was charged with murdering the sheriff's son, and was taken from the jail and lynched. Tillman sent the state solicitor to Edgefield to investigate the matter, and ridiculed the coroner's jury verdict. As usual in cases of lynching, it stated the deceased had been killed by persons unknown. Tillman said, "the law received a wound for every bullet shot into Dick Lundy's body." The News and Courier opined that had he been present "with true Edgefield instinct, [Tillman] would probably have been hanging around on the edge of the mob".

In April 1893, Mamie Baxter, a fourteen-year-old girl in Denmark, Barnwell County, alleged that an African American unknown to her had attempted to attack her. About twenty black men were detained and paraded before her; she stated that Henry Williams looked something like the man she had seen. Placed on what passed for a trial by the mob that took him from the jail, Williams produced several respected white men to support his alibi. A majority of the mob voted against killing him, and Williams was returned to jail. More searches were made for Baxter's attacker. A suspect in the case, John Peterson, appealed to Tillman for protection, fearing he would be lynched if taken to Denmark, and stating he could prove his innocence. Tillman sent Peterson to Denmark with a single guard. He was taken by the mob, put on "trial", and after the mob found him guilty, was murdered. There was widespread outrage among both races across the country, both at the actions of the lynchers and at what Tillman had done. The governor said, in response, that he had assumed that, as the mob had been convinced by Williams' defense, it would allow Peterson to prove his innocence as well. He thereafter ignored the issue of the Denmark lynching.

There were five lynchings in South Carolina during Tillman's first term, and thirteen during his second. Tillman had to walk a narrow line in the debates over lynching, since most of his supporters believed in the collective right of white men in a community to dispense mob justice, especially in cases of alleged rape. Yet as governor, he was sworn to uphold the rule of law. He attempted to finesse the matter by seeking to appeal to both sides, demanding that the law be followed, but that he would, as he stated in 1892, "willingly lead a mob in lynching a Negro who had committed an assault on a white woman". Under criticism, he amended this to a willingness to lead the lynching of "a man of any color who assaults a virtuous woman of any color"—the adjective "virtuous" limiting the commitment, in Tillman's view, to assaults on white women.

During Tillman's second term, he had the legislature pass a bill to abolish elected local government, in favor of gubernatorial appointment of municipal and county officials. Tillman used this law to oust black officials even where that race held a voting majority. In September 1893, South Carolina was hit by storms. Tillman discouraged northerners from sending aid to African Americans, fearing it would result in "lazy, idle crowds [wanting to] draw rations, as in the days of the Freedmen's Bureau ... They cannot be treated as we would white people."

During the 1895 South Carolina state constitutional convention, however, Tillman supported a provision that permitted the removal from office of sheriffs who through negligence or connivance permitted a lynching. He also supported a provision that held the county where the lynching occurred liable for damages of $2,000 or more to be paid to the heirs of the victim.

==== Alcohol and the dispensary ====
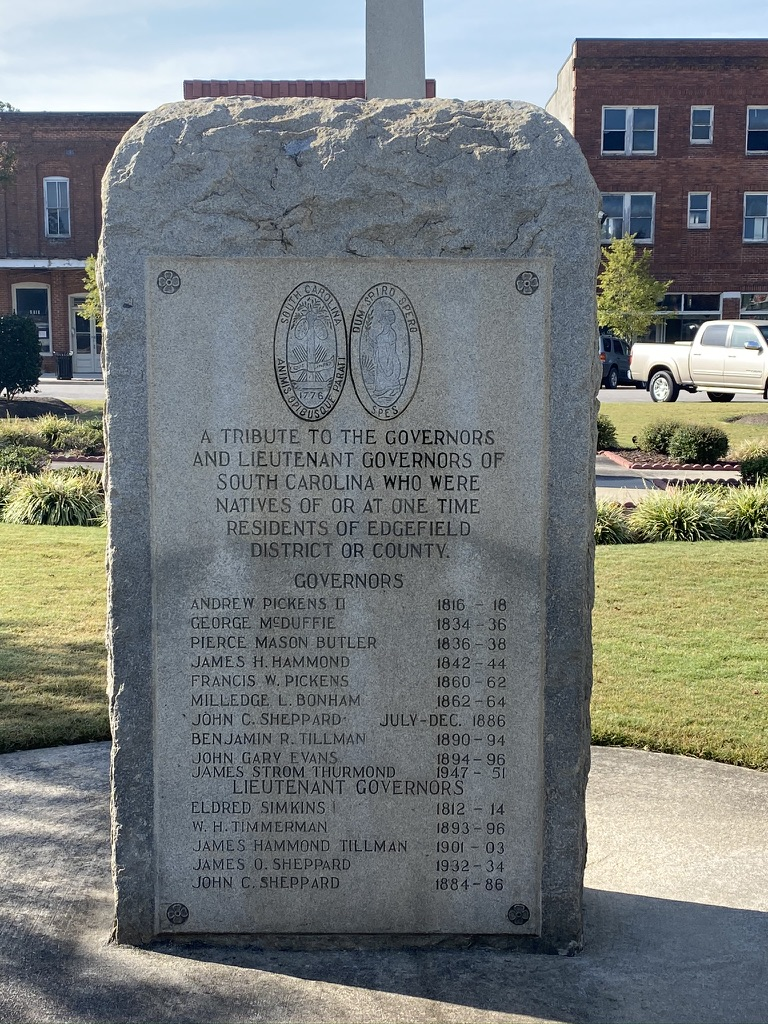
Edgefield monument to the governors and lieutenant governors from there, including Tillman and his second lieutenant governor, Washington H. Timmerman. Seen in 2020.

The question of prohibition of alcohol was a major issue in South Carolina during Tillman's governorship. Tillman opposed banning alcohol, but was careful to speak well of temperance advocates, many of whom were women. The concern Tillman had with alcohol issues was that they divided the white community, leaving openings for black Republicans to exploit.

In the 1892 election, South Carolinians passed a non-binding referendum calling for prohibition. Bills were introduced into both houses of the state legislature that December to accomplish this, and passed the House of Representatives. Before the House bill could be passed by the Senate, Tillman sent a proposal in the form of an amendment, with instructions to pass the amended bill, and enact nothing else on the subject. Based on a system that had been successful in Athens, Georgia, the bill banned the private sale of alcohol, setting up a system of dispensaries that would sell alcohol in sealed containers—sale by the drink, and consumption on the premises, would not be permitted. Both houses passed Tillman's amendment, though there was opposition both within and outside the legislature. The dispensary system went into effect on July 1, 1893.

The new law was met with considerable resistance, especially in the towns and cities, where Tillman had less support. Dozens of clandestine saloons opened, fueled by barrels of illicit liquor, often transported by railroad. Tillman appointed dispensary constables, who tried to seize such shipments, to be frustrated by the fact that the South Carolina Railroad was in federal receivership, and state authorities could not confiscate goods entrusted to it. All of Tillman's constables were white, placing him at a disadvantage in dealing with the alcohol trade among African Americans. Some of the constables tried going undercover by blacking their faces like minstrels; later, Tillman hired an African-American detective from Georgia.

The small city of Darlington became a center of the bootlegging trade, with many illegal saloons. Tillman repeatedly warned the local mayor to crack down; when this did not occur, in April 1894, Tillman sent a train full of constables and other enforcement personnel to Darlington. They were repelled by gunfire, with dead on both sides. Tillman called out the state militia, which put down the unrest, though some units refused to serve. After the incident, Tillman disbanded the units of the militia that had refused his orders, and organized new companies to serve in their place. The Darlington riot divided the state politically as Tillman prepared to seek Butler's seat in the Senate, which would be filled by the legislature in December 1894.

Only weeks after the Darlington affair, the South Carolina Supreme Court declared the act creating the dispensary system in violation of the state constitution on the grounds that the government had no right to run a profit-making business. The vote was 2–1, with Justice Samuel McGowan in the majority. McGowan was a lame duck in office; Lieutenant Governor Gary had been elected to fill his seat effective August 1, 1894. Tillman closed the dispensaries temporarily, resulting in prohibition in South Carolina, and fired the constables. He had taken the precaution, once the court agreed to take the dispensary case, of having the 1893 legislature pass a revised dispensary law. When Gary took the bench, the Tillmanites would have a majority on the state Supreme Court, and Tillman instructed trial justices not to hear challenges to the 1893 law until after August 1. Tillman kept the law suspended until then, afterwards reopening the dispensaries under that statute. The high court declared the 1893 act constitutional on October 8, 1894, 2–1, with Gary voting in the majority. (Note: The case ruling the dispensaries unconstitutional was McCullough v. Brown, 19 S.E. 458 (S.C. 1894); the case upholding the revised law was State ex rel. George v. City Council of Aiken, 20 S.E. 221 (S.C. 1894).)

==== Agriculture and higher education ====
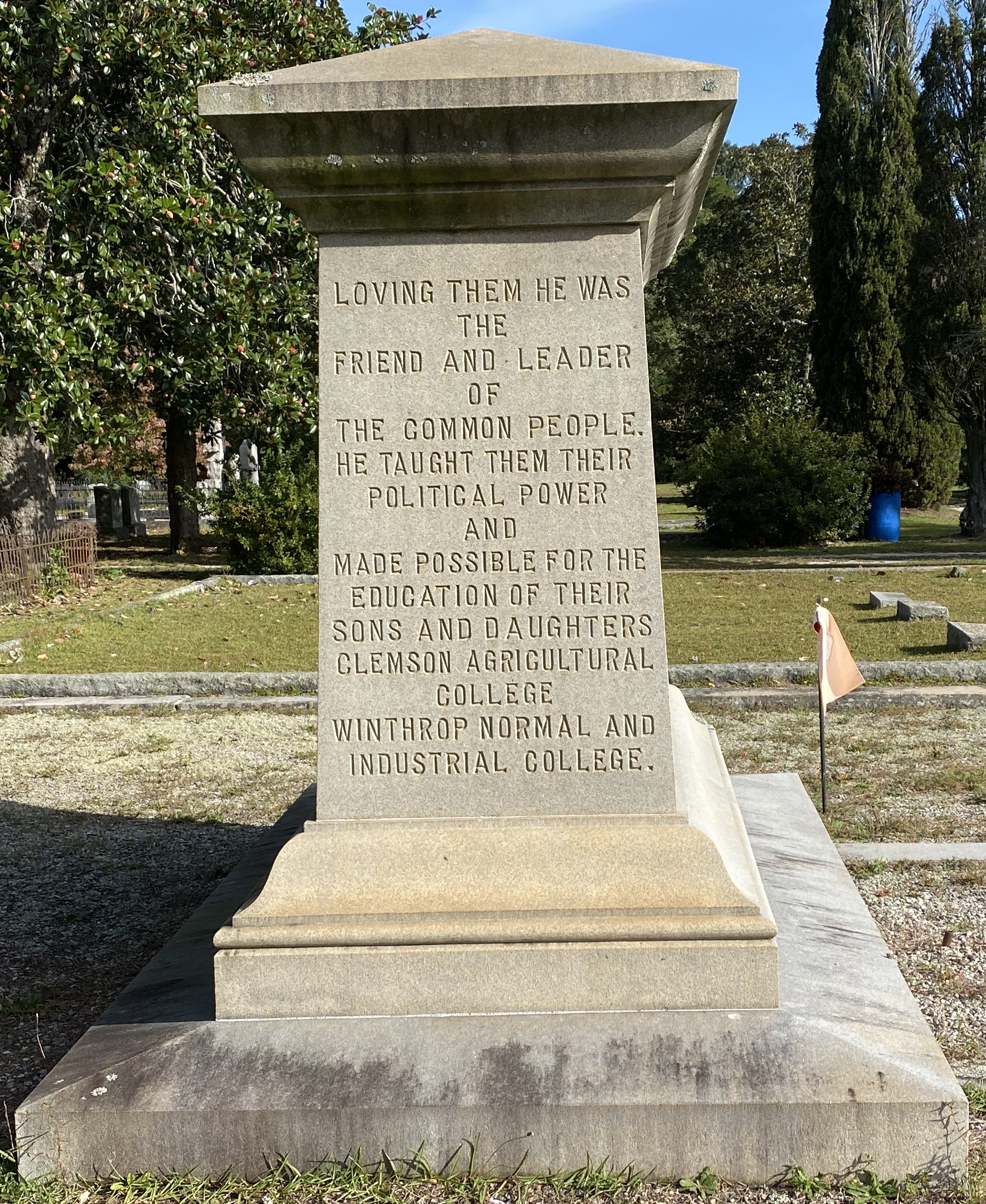
The side of Tillman's grave marker mentions his role in the foundings of Clemson and Winthrop. Seen in 2020.

Elected with support from the Farmers' Alliance and as a result of agricultural protest, Tillman was thought likely to join the Populists in their challenge to the established parties. Tillman refused, and generally opposed Populist positions that went beyond his program of increasing access to higher education and reform of the Democratic Party (white supremacy was not a Populist position). The Alliance (and Populists) demanded a system of subtreasuries under the federal government, that could accept farmers' crops and advance them 80 percent of the value interest-free. Tillman, not wanting more federal officeholders in the state (that in Republican administrations might be filled by African Americans), initially opposed the proposal. Many farmers felt strongly about this issue, and in 1891, Tillman was censured by the state Alliance for his opposition. Attuned to political necessities, Tillman gradually came to support the subtreasuries in time for his re-election campaign in 1892, though he was never an active proponent.

Tillman spoke at the opening of Clemson College on July 6, 1893. He fulfilled his campaign promise to start a women's college. In 1891, the legislature passed a bill creating the South Carolina Industrial and Winthrop Normal College (today Winthrop University). He took a personal interest in the bidding by various towns around the state for the new school, and supported the successful candidate, the progressive town of Rock Hill, on the state's northern border. Rock Hill officials had offered land, cash, and building materials. The school, then admitting only white women, opened in October 1895, after Tillman had become a senator.

==== Re-election in 1892 ====
Tillman sought election to a second two-year term in 1892, presenting himself as a reforming alternative to the Conservatives. In the campaign, Tillman was a strong supporter of free silver or bimetallism, making silver legal tender at the historic ratio to gold of 16:1. Such a policy would inflate the currency, and Tillman felt that would make it easier for the farmer to repay debts. The rhetoric of free silver suited Tillman as well, as he could make himself appear the champion of the farmer against the powerful interests that had committed the "Crime of '73" (as silver supporters termed the act ending bimetallism in the United States).

Announcing that a primary for 1892, as had been prescribed two years before, was anti-reform, Tillman put off the first Democratic gubernatorial primary in the state until 1894. Thus, the nominee would be chosen by a convention, and mid-1892 saw a lengthy series of debates between Tillman and his challenger, former governor John C. Sheppard. The bitter campaign was marked by violence, often set off by provocative language from the candidates. According to Kantrowitz, Tillman "sought to prolong the confrontation, to take the crowd up to the edge of violence, demonstrating his identification with his farmers without quite provoking them to murder". When former senator Hampton attempted to speak on Sheppard's behalf, he was shouted down by Tillman partisans; opponents complained that Tillman's supporters had formed a mob, and that the governor was a true son of violent Edgefield.

As the likely Democratic presidential candidate for 1892, former president Grover Cleveland, was a staunch opponent of free silver, Tillman attacked Cleveland. Most of the South Carolina delegation, including Tillman, voted against Cleveland at the convention, but when the former president was nominated, the governor worked to deliver South Carolina for Cleveland by an overwhelming margin. Cleveland was elected, but the new president was offended by Tillman's earlier attacks, and denied the governor any role in patronage in South Carolina, entrusting it to Senator Matthew Butler and other remaining Conservatives. Tillman's inability to provide federal jobs for supporters made it more difficult for him to hold his coalition together. Tillman continued his verbal assaults, stating that Cleveland "is an old bag of beef and I am going to Washington with a pitchfork and prod him in his old fat ribs"—thus popularizing Tillman as "Pitchfork Ben".

During the 1892 campaign, Tillman called for the defeat in the Democratic primary for the legislature of most of the men elected as his supporters, urging the selection of more loyal men. Tillman urged the voters, "turn out this cattle, these driftwood legislators, and send me a legislature that will do what I say, and I'll show you reform." South Carolinians dutifully voted out their representatives as Tillman requested. Although no primary for governor was permitted, the delegates to the nominating convention were elected by the Democratic voters, and Tillman won an overwhelming victory over Sheppard, who took only four of 35 counties. The convention was mostly Tillmanite, and gave the governor an easy triumph. The Conservatives had agreed not to bolt the party, and Tillman won uncontested re-election.

=== Senate election of 1894 ===
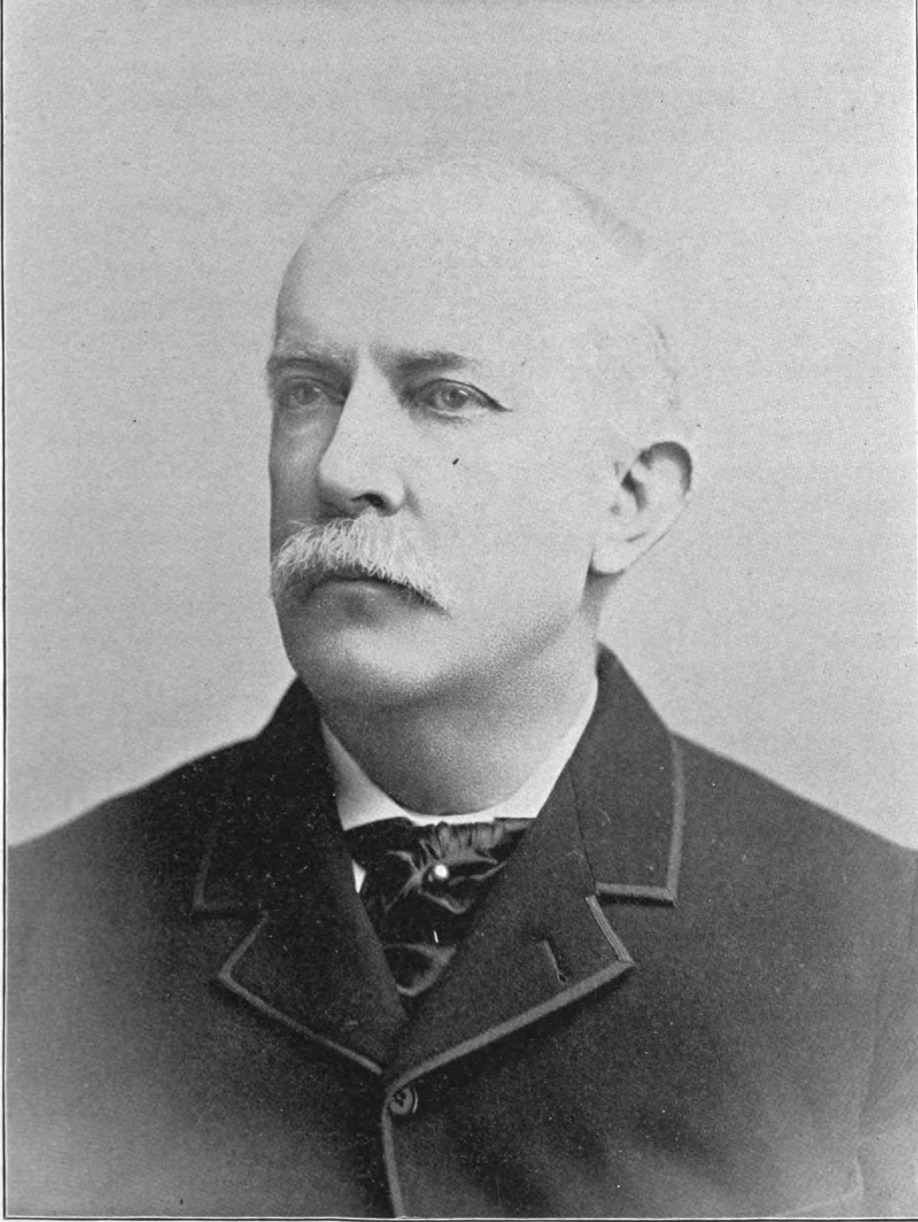
Senator Matthew C. Butler

Tillman had long seen a Senate seat as a logical next step once he concluded his time as governor. Senator Butler, whose term expired in March 1895, had soon after the 1890 election begun to shift his positions towards Tillman's, hoping to retain Conservative backing while appealing to the governor's supporters. The senator signed on to most demands of the Farmers' Alliance, and did not support the forces trying to prevent Tillman's re-nomination in 1892. Butler's seeming apostasy disheartened Conservatives, who did not bother to run candidates for the legislature in many counties in 1894, abandoning the field (and Butler's Senate seat) to the Tillmanites. The governor took nothing for granted, seeing to it that popular candidates, loyal to him, ran for the legislature. In addition to electing Tillman to the Senate, these legislators could help preserve his gubernatorial legacy, including the dispensary.

Butler was aware of the uphill struggle he faced, and called for a primary for senator, with all Democratic legislators committed to vote to elect the winner. Tillman, who had already finalized his plans to win in the legislature, refused. The series of debates that marked a campaign summer in South Carolina began on June 18, 1894. Butler believed he could still win by appealing to the electorate in the same manner as Tillman; the senator thought he understood the lessons of 1876 as well as anyone. In the debates, Butler and Tillman matched slander for slander, with Butler claiming that at Hamburg, when the shooting started, Tillman was "nowhere to be found". Tillman shot back that when Butler had testified before Congress about Hamburg, he had downplayed his role in the events. According to Kantrowitz, "their struggle over the legacy of 1876 was in part over who could more legitimately claim to have murdered" African Americans. Tillman's partisans shouted down Butler when he tried to speak at some debates. Although this tactic had been used by Butler and other Democrats against the Republicans in 1876, Butler now decried it as "not Christian civilization to howl anyone down".

Balked again, Butler attempted to turn the campaign personal, calling Tillman a liar and trying to strike him. Tillman warned that Butler's tactics risked sundering white unity, stating to a questioner who asked why he did not meet Butler's insults with violence, "Yes, I tell you, you cowardly hound, why I took them [the insults], and I'll meet you wherever you want to. I took them because I, as governor of the State, could not afford to create a row at a public meeting and have our people murder each other like dogs."

By early July, Butler had realized the futility of his race, and took to ignoring Tillman in his speeches, which the governor reciprocated, taking much of the drama from the debates. The two men even rode in the same carriage on July 4. Nevertheless, Butler refused to surrender, even after the primary for the legislature was overwhelmingly won by the Tillmanites, threatening action in the courts and an election contest before the Senate. On December 11, 1894, Tillman was elected to the Senate by the new legislature with 131 votes. Butler received 21 and three votes were scattered.

== Senator (1895–1918) ==
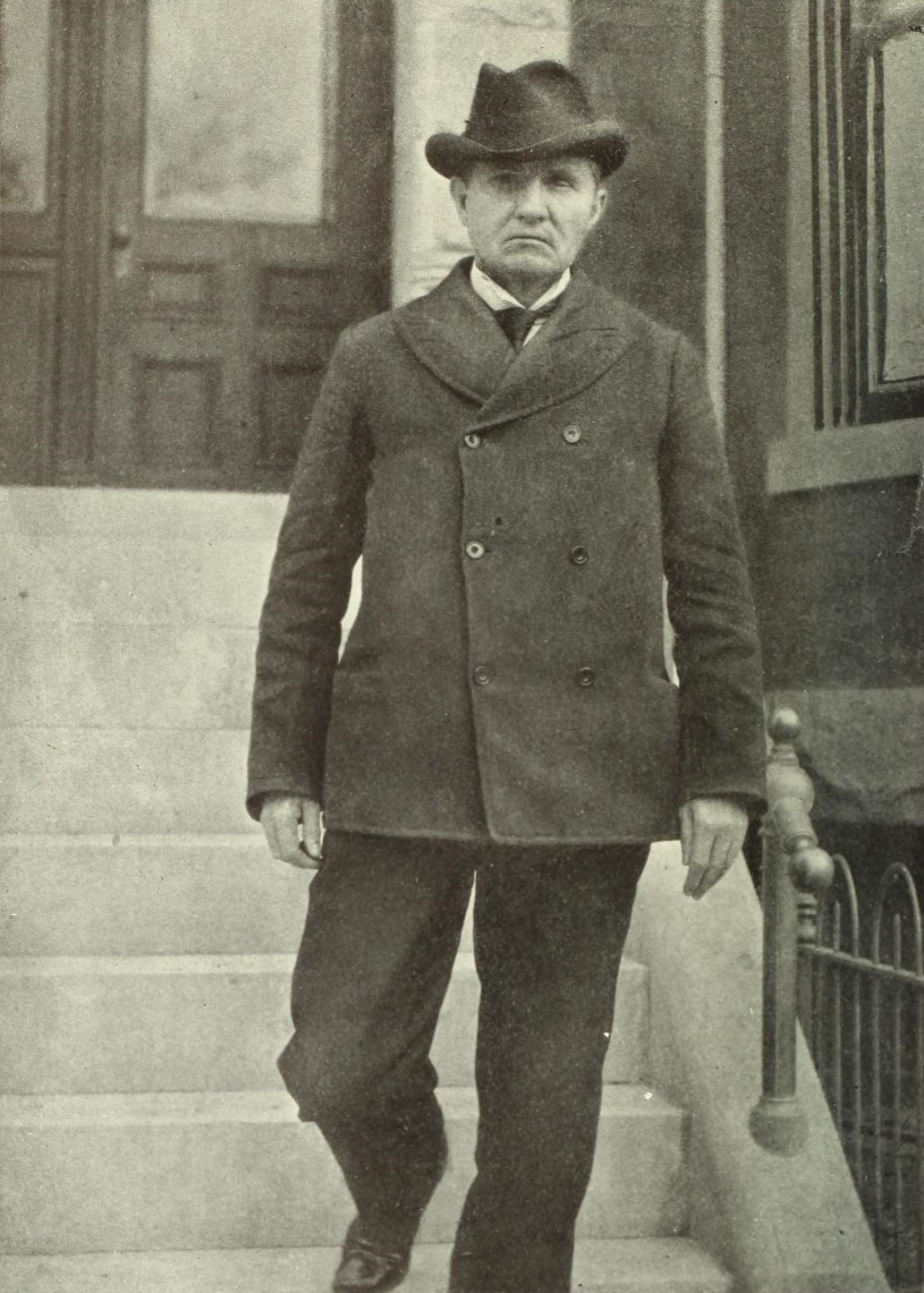
Tillman as a senator

=== Disenfranchising the African American: 1895 state constitutional convention ===
Throughout his time as governor, Tillman had sought a convention to rewrite South Carolina's Reconstruction-era constitution. His main purpose in doing so was to disenfranchise African Americans. They opposed Tillman's proposal, as did others, who had seen previous efforts to restrict the franchise rebound against white voters. Tillman was successful in getting the legislature to place a referendum for a constitutional convention on the November 1894 general election ballot. It passed by 2,000 votes statewide, the narrow margin gained, according to Kantrowitz, most likely through fraud. John Gary Evans was elected Tillman's successor as governor.

Opponents sued in the courts to overturn the referendum result; they were unsuccessful. During the convention, Tillman hailed it as "a fitting capstone to the triumphal arch which the common people have erected to liberty, progress, and Anglo-Saxon civilization since 1890". To assure white unity, Tillman allowed the election of Conservatives as about a third of delegates. The convention assembled in Columbia in September 1895, consisting of 112 Tillmanites, 42 Conservatives, and six African Americans. Tillman called black disenfranchisement "the sole cause of our being here".

Tillman was the dominant figure of the convention, chairing the Committee on the Rights of Suffrage, which was to craft language to accomplish the disenfranchisement. Constrained by the requirement of the federal Fifteenth Amendment that men of all races be allowed to vote, the committee sought language that, though superficially nondiscriminatory, would operate or could be used to take the vote from most African Americans.

Tillman spoke to the convention on October 31. In addition to supporting the provisions of the draft document, he recalled 1876:

How did we recover our liberty? By fraud and violence. We tried to overcome the thirty thousand majority by honest methods, which was a mathematical impossibility. After we had borne these indignities for eight years life became worthless under such conditions. Under the leadership and inspiration of Mart[in] Gary ... we won the fight.

The adopted provisions, which came into force after the new constitution was ratified by the convention in December 1895, set a maze of obstacles before prospective voters. Voters had to be a resident of the state two years, the county one year, and the precinct for four months. Many African Americans were itinerant laborers, and this provision disproportionately affected them. A poll tax had to be paid six months in advance of the election, in May when laborers had the least cash. Each registrant had to prove to the satisfaction of the county board of elections that he could read or write a section of the state constitution (in a literacy or comprehension test), or that he paid taxes on property valued at $300 or more. This allowed white registrars ample discretion to disenfranchise African Americans. Illiterate whites were shielded by the "understanding" clause, that allowed, until 1898, permanent registration to citizens who could "understand" the constitution when read to them. This also allowed officials great leeway to discriminate. Even if an African American maneuvered past all of these obstacles, he still faced the manager of the polling place, who could demand proof he had paid all taxes owed—something difficult to show conclusively. Conviction of any of a long list of crimes that whites believed prevalent among African Americans was made the cause of permanent disenfranchisement, including bigamy, adultery, burglary, and arson. Convicted murderers not in prison had their franchise undisturbed.

Tillman defended this on the floor of the Senate on March 23,1900 :

In my State there were 135,000 negro voters, or negroes of voting age, and some 90,000 or 95,000 white voters.... Now, I want to ask you, with a free vote and a fair count, how are you going to beat 135,000 by 95,000? How are you going to do it? You had set us an impossible task.

We did not disfranchise the negroes until 1895. Then we had a constitutional convention convened which took the matter up calmly, deliberately, and avowedly with the purpose of disfranchising as many of them as we could under the fourteenth and fifteenth amendments. We adopted the educational qualification as the only means left to us, and the negro is as contented and as prosperous and as well protected in South Carolina to-day as in any State of the Union south of the Potomac. He is not meddling with politics, for he found that the more he meddled with them the worse off he got. As to his "rights"—I will not discuss them now. We of the South have never recognized the right of the negro to govern white men, and we never will.... I would to God the last one of them was in Africa and that none of them had ever been brought to our shores.

=== 1896 presidential bid ===
By early 1896, many in the Democratic Party were bitterly opposed to President Cleveland and his policies. The United States was by then in the third year of a deep recession, the Panic of 1893. Cleveland was a firm supporter of the gold standard, and soon after the recession began forced through repeal of the Sherman Silver Purchase Act, which he believed had helped cause it. Sherman's act, although not restoring bimetallism, had required the government to purchase and coin large quantities of silver bullion, and its repeal outraged supporters of free silver. Other Cleveland policies, such as his forcible suppression of the Pullman Strike, led to the Democrats losing control of both houses of Congress in the 1894 midterm elections, and to a revolt against him by silver supporters within his party.

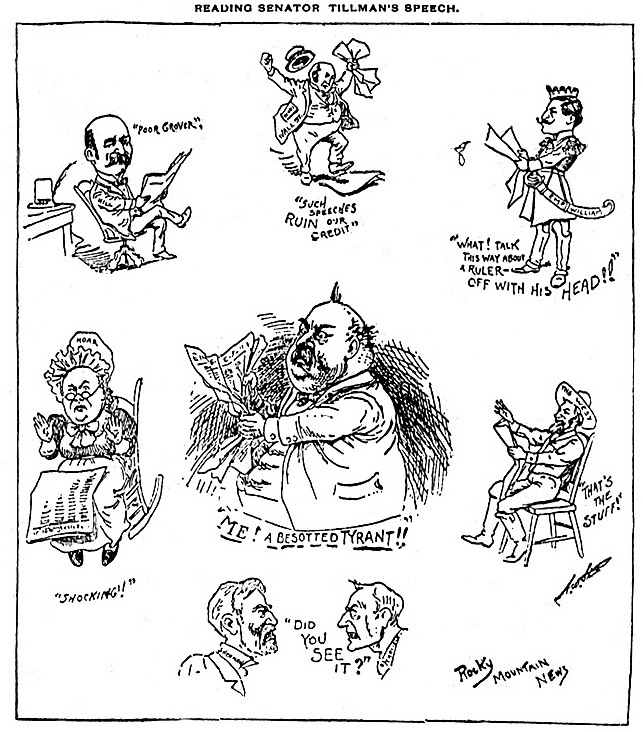
This 1896 political cartoon suggests that though Tillman's speech might outrage President Cleveland (center), it was just what westerners (center right) wanted to hear.

From the time of his swearing-in in December 1895 (when Congress began its annual session), Tillman was seen as the voice of the dissatisfied in the nation; the New York Press stated Tillman would voice the concerns of "the masses of the people of South Carolina far more faithfully than did the Bourbon politician Butler". He shocked the Senate with dramatic attacks on Cleveland, calling the president "the most gigantic failure of any man who ever occupied the White House, all because of his vanity and obstinacy". The New York Times deemed Tillman "a filthy baboon, accidentally seated in the Senate chamber".

Tillman believed that the nation was on the verge of major political change, and that he could be elected president in 1896, uniting the silver supporters of the South and West. He was willing to consider a third party bid if Cleveland kept control of the Democratic Party, but felt the Populists, by allowing African Americans to seek office, had destroyed their credibility among southern whites. The stinging oratory of the South Carolina senator brought him national prominence, and with the 1896 Democratic National Convention in Chicago likely to be controlled by silver supporters, Tillman was spoken of as a possible presidential candidate along with others, such as former Missouri representative Richard P. Bland, Texas Governor Jim Hogg, and former Nebraska congressman William Jennings Bryan.

Tillman was his state's favorite son candidate, and its representative on the Committee on Resolutions (often called "the Platform Committee"). The platform had the support of the pro-silver majority of the committee, but the gold minority, led by New York Senator David B. Hill, opposed its support of free silver, and wanted to take the disagreement to the convention floor. With one hour and fifteen minutes allocated to each side, Tillman and Bryan were selected as the speakers in favor of the draft platform. Bryan asked Tillman if he wanted to open or close the debate; the senator wanted to close, but sought fifty minutes to do so. The Nebraskan replied that Hill would oppose such a long closing address, and Tillman agreed to open the debate, with Bryan to close it.

When the platform debate began in the Chicago Coliseum on the morning of July 9, 1896, Tillman was the opening speaker. Although met with applause and shouts of his name, he "spoke in the same manner that had won him success in South Carolina, cursing, haranguing his enemies, and raising the specter of sectionalism. He, however, thoroughly alienated the national audience". According to Richard Bensel in his study of the 1896 convention, Tillman gave "by far, the most divisive speech of the convention, an address that embarrassed the silver wing of the party as much as it enraged the hard-money faction". He deemed silver a sectional issue, pitting the wealthy East against the oppressed South and West. This upset delegates, who wished to view silver as a patriotic, national issue, and some voiced their dissent, disagreeing with Tillman. The senator alternately offended, confused, and bored the delegates, who shouted for Tillman to stop even though less than half of his time had expired. Beset by shouting delegates and one of the convention bands, which unexpectedly appeared and began to play, Tillman nevertheless pressed on, "the audience might just as well understand that I am going to have my say if I stand here until sundown." By the time he had his say, he had "effectively destroyed his chances to become a national candidate". With Tillman's candidacy stillborn (only his home state voted for him), Bryan seized the opportunity to deliver an address in support of silver that did not rely on sectionalism. His Cross of Gold speech won him the presidential nomination.

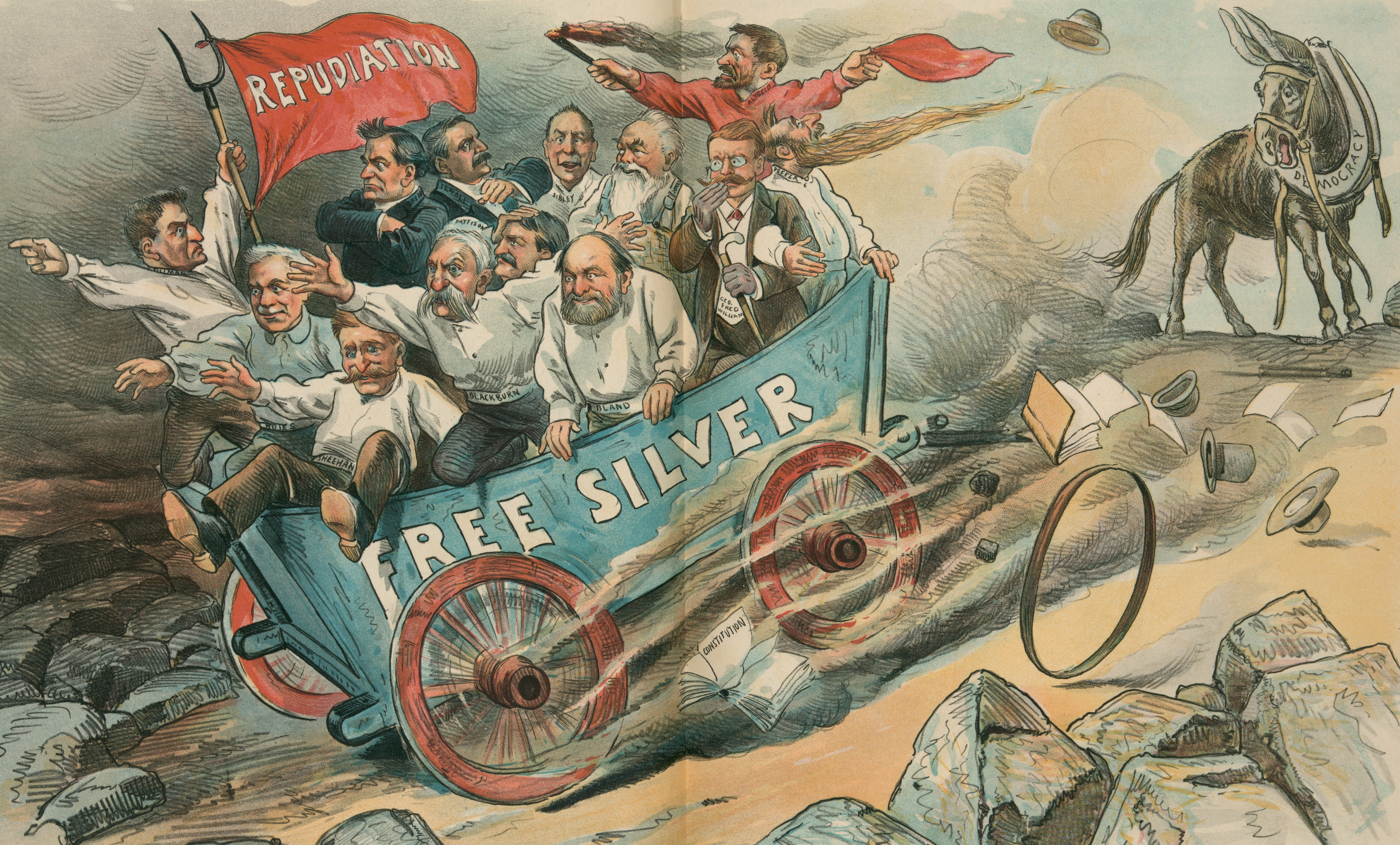
Cartoon hostile to the Democrats in the 1896 campaign, showing the Free Silver bandwagon going downhill with its wheels coming off. Tillman stands at rear left, holding his pitchfork, next to Bryan.

After Tillman returned from Chicago to South Carolina, he suggested he had delivered an intentionally radical speech so as to allow Bryan to look statesmanlike by comparison. This interpretation was mocked by his enemies. Tillman is not known to have otherwise discussed his feelings at the failure of his presidential bid, and the political grief was likely overwhelmed by personal sadness a week after the convention when his beloved daughter Addie died, struck by lightning on a North Carolina mountain. Tillman campaigned for Bryan, but was a favorite target of cartoonists denigrating the Democratic candidate and supporting the Republican, former Ohio governor William McKinley. Bryan had also been nominated by the Populists, who selected their own vice presidential candidate, Georgia's Thomas E. Watson. Tillman was active in efforts to get Watson to withdraw, having a 12-hour meeting with the candidate, apparently without result. Tillman traveled widely to speak on Bryan's behalf, and drew large crowds, but his speeches were of little significance. Despite undertaking an arduous campaign, Bryan lost the election. Simkins suggested that Tillman, by helping forge an image of the Democratic Party as anarchic, contributed to Bryan's defeat.

=== Wild man of the Senate: Tillman-McLaurin fistfight ===
Kantrowitz deemed Tillman "the Senate's wild man", who applied the same techniques of accusation and insinuation that had served him well in South Carolina. In 1897, Tillman accused the Republicans, "I certainly do not want to attack any member of the committee who does not deserve to be attacked [but] nobody denies that there have been rooms occupied for two months by the Republicans on the Senate Finance Committee at the Arlington Hotel (Note: A residential hotel near the White House, where a number of members of Congress lived while in Washington.) ... in easy reach of the sugar trust". Simkins, though, opined that Tillman's speeches in the Senate were only inflammatory because of his injection of personalities, and if that is disregarded, his speeches, when read, come across as well-reasoned and even conservative.

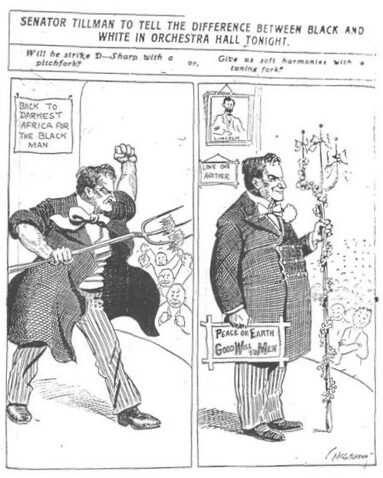
Chicago Tribune cartoon, published November 27, 1906, just before Tillman gave a speech there, wondering whether Tillman will act the part of "Pitchfork Ben" or a dignified senator

In 1902, Tillman accused his junior colleague from South Carolina, John L. McLaurin, of corruption in a speech to the Senate. McLaurin, who had been a Tillmanite before breaking from him after being elected to the Senate, called him a liar, whereupon Tillman rushed across the Senate floor and punched McLaurin in the face; McLaurin responded by punching Tillman in the nose before the Sergeant at Arms and other Senators intervened. The body immediately went into closed session, and held both men in contempt.

The Senate considered suspending them, but Tillman argued that it was unfair to deprive South Carolina of her representation, though the body could have also expelled the two men, knowing he had enough Democratic votes to prevent this. In the end, both men were censured, and later that year, Tillman arranged for McLaurin, whose term ended in 1903, to not be re-elected.

The fracas with McLaurin caused President Theodore Roosevelt, who had succeeded the assassinated McKinley in 1901, to withdraw an invitation to dinner at the White House. Tillman never forgave this slight, and became a bitter enemy of Roosevelt.

Tillman was inclined to oppose Roosevelt anyway, who soon after becoming president, dined at the White House with Booker T. Washington, an African American. Tillman responded by saying "the action of President Roosevelt in entertaining that nigger will necessitate our killing a thousand niggers in the South before they learn their place again."

=== Race relations ===
Is President Roosevelt ready to act up to his own theory and have his children marry men and women of the other races? Would he accept as a daughter-in-law a Chinese, a Malay, an Indian, or a negro in accord to the doctrine laid down in his message which I have quoted? (Note: Roosevelt had issued a statement saying that each of the accused men at Brownsville would be dealt with on his merits, without regard to race. See Tillman 1907, p. 4) We all know that he would not, and while "fine words butter no parsnips" words like these are a source of incalculable evil.

— Tillman addressing the Senate on the Brownsville affair, January 12, 1907

Tillman believed, and often stated as senator, that blacks must submit to either white domination or extermination. He was reluctant to undertake the latter, fearing hundreds of whites would die accomplishing it. He campaigned in the violent 1898 North Carolina elections, in which white Democrats were determined to take back control from a biracial Populist-Republican coalition elected in 1894 and 1896 on a fusion ticket. He spoke widely in North Carolina in late 1898, often to crowds wearing red shirts, disheartening his Populist supporters. On October 20, 1898, Tillman was the featured speaker at the Democratic Party's Great White Man's Rally and Basket Picnic in Fayetteville. Tillman spoke furiously to the crowd of white men, asking them why North Carolina had not rid itself of black office holders as South Carolina had in 1876. He chastized the audience for not lynching Alex Manly, the black editor of the Wilmington Daily Record. Tillman was one of many prominent Democrats advocating use of violence to win the 1898 election. The Wilmington massacre expelled opposition black and white political leaders from Wilmington, destroyed the property and businesses of black citizens built up since the Civil War, including the only black newspaper in the city, and killed an estimated 60 to more than 300 people. Terror and intimidation again won the day for the Democrats, who were elected statewide. South Carolina saw violence as well: an effort to register black voters in Phoenix led whites to provoke a confrontation, after which a number of African Americans were murdered. Tillman warned African Americans and those who might combine with them that black political activism would provoke a murderous response from whites.

Beginning in 1901, Tillman joined the Chautauqua circuit, giving well-paid speeches throughout the nation. Tillman's reputation, both for his views and his oratory, attracted large crowds. Tillman informed them that African Americans were inferior to the white man, but were not baboons, though some were "so near akin to the monkey that scientists are yet looking for the missing link". Given that in Africa, they were an "ignorant and debased and debauched race" with a record of "barbarism, savagery, cannibalism and everything that is low and degrading", it was the "quintessence of folly" to believe that the black man should be placed on an equal footing with his white counterpart. Tillman "embraced segregation as divinely imperative".

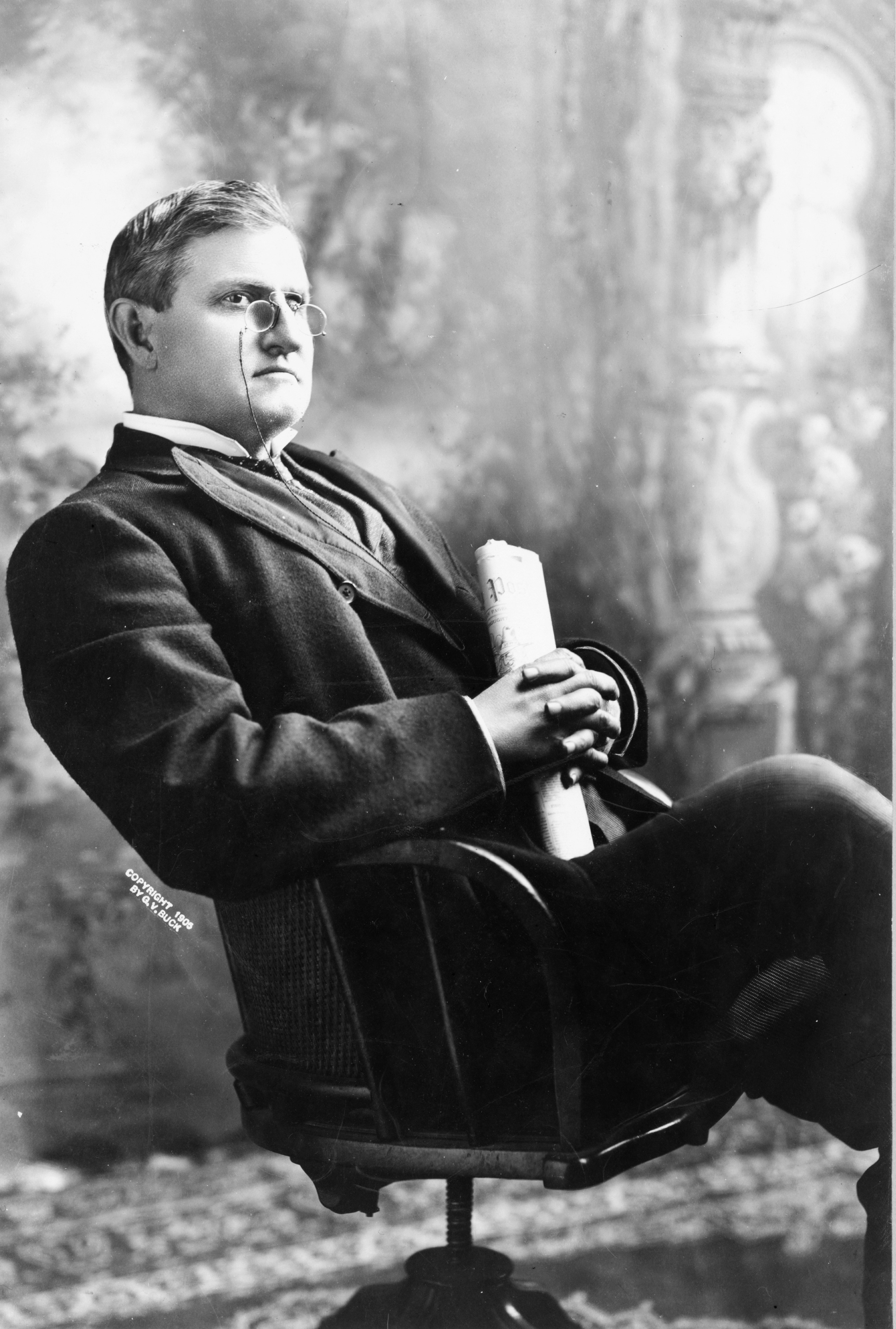
Tillman in 1906

Tillman told the Senate, "as governor of South Carolina, I proclaimed that, although I had taken the oath of office to support the law and enforce it, I would lead a mob to lynch any man, black or white, who ravished a woman, black or white." He told his colleagues, "I have three daughters, but, so help me God, I had rather find either one of them killed by a tiger or a bear [and die a virgin] than to have her crawl to me and tell me the horrid story that she had been robbed of the jewel of her womanhood by a black fiend." In 1907, he told the senators about the Ellenton massacre of 1876, "it was then that we shot them; it was then that we killed them; it was then that we stuffed the ballot-boxes."

As South Carolina's economy changed in the early 20th century, with textile mills being built, Tillman complained that some African Americans were evading the supervision they would have on the farm, fearing the threat to white women. He admitted that it would be unjust to kill all of these workers, "because we might kill some innocent men, but we can keep them on the chain gang".

=== Legislative activities and re-elections ===
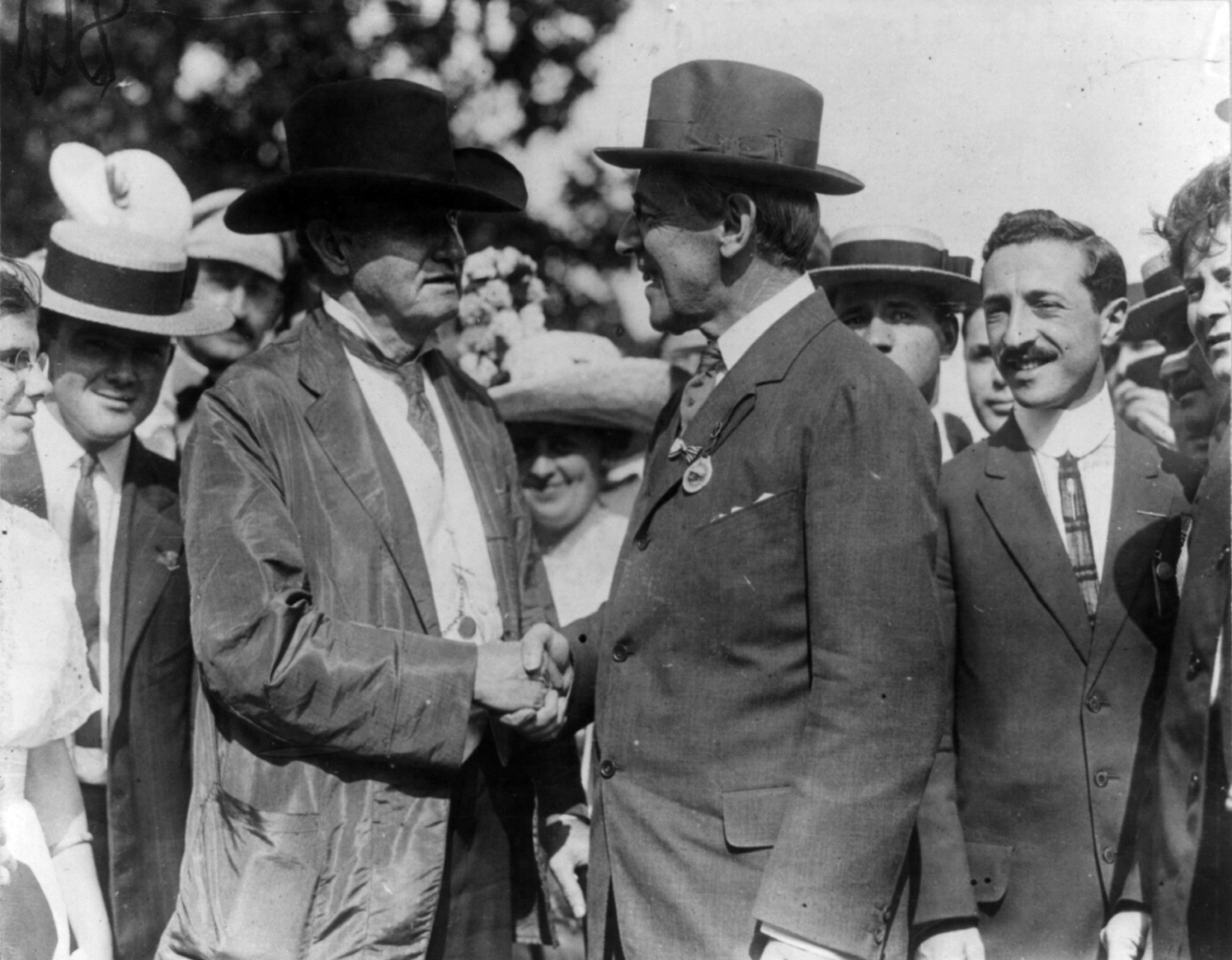
Tillman (center left) with Woodrow Wilson

Tillman was an early and fervent backer of war with Spain in 1898. However, he opposed taking the Spanish colonies such as Puerto Rico and the Philippines, both because he considered it wrong to annex people to the United States without their consent and out of opposition to adding territories with large numbers of non-whites. Tillman mocked the Republicans, most of whom supported annexation rather than self-determination, stating that it was that party that since 1860 had claimed "that all men, including the Negro, are free and equal," and was annoyed when they refused to admit their positions were inconsistent.

In 1906, Roosevelt backed the Hepburn Bill, imposing railroad regulation. Many Republicans initially wanted nothing to do with the bill, and Senate Republican leader Nelson Aldrich entrusted management of the bill to Tillman. Aldrich hoped that the outspoken South Carolinian would cause the defeat of the bill. To Aldrich's surprise, Tillman soberly and competently conducted the bill through much of the legislative process. Tillman withdrew from the bill (though he voted for it) after Roosevelt obtained inclusion of a provision for federal court review of agency decisions, which Tillman opposed. The president and the Southern senator ended on worse terms than before, but there was great public attention on the Hepburn Bill, and Tillman gained considerable respect for his role.

This activity caused a public reassessment of Tillman, who was best known for giving speeches that shocked the North and made even Southerners cringe. Writers suggested that he was merely presenting an image as "Pitchfork Ben" that he could turn on and off as needed. He came to be regarded in the North as acceptable and even respectable, with some suggesting that he had matured during his time in the Senate. The Saturday Evening Post compared Tillman with a coconut; hard, rough, and shaggy on the outside, but within, "the milk of human kindness".

Tillman was the primary sponsor of the Tillman Act, the first federal campaign-finance reform law, which was passed in 1907 and banned corporate contributions in federal political campaigns. Justice Clarence Thomas has suggested that Tillman's motivation in introducing this legislation was to reduce the power of corporations, which tended to favor Republicans and African Americans.

When Tillman entered the Senate in 1895, he was opposed to expansion of the United States Navy, fearing that the expenditure would cause the issuance of bonds by the president, which he felt would only enrich the wealthy. Tillman sat on the Senate Committee on Naval Affairs and soon came to understand that South Carolina could benefit from naval appropriations steered towards her. A flow of federal funds to his home state resulted, beginning in 1900, followed by the establishment, in 1909, of the Charleston Naval Shipyard. Once Democrats took control of the Senate for the first time in Tillman's tenure, in 1913, he became chairman of the committee and allied with others from the Southeast (such as Navy Secretary Josephus Daniels, a North Carolinian) to see that the bulk of naval appropriations would be spent there.

Tillman also served as chairman of the Committee on Revolutionary Claims (57th through 59th Congresses) and on the Committee on Five Civilized Tribes of Indians (61st and 62nd Congresses). Strokes in 1908 and 1910 decreased his influence and ability in the Senate; his seniority entitled him to become Senate Appropriations Committee chairman in 1913, but his health did not permit it.

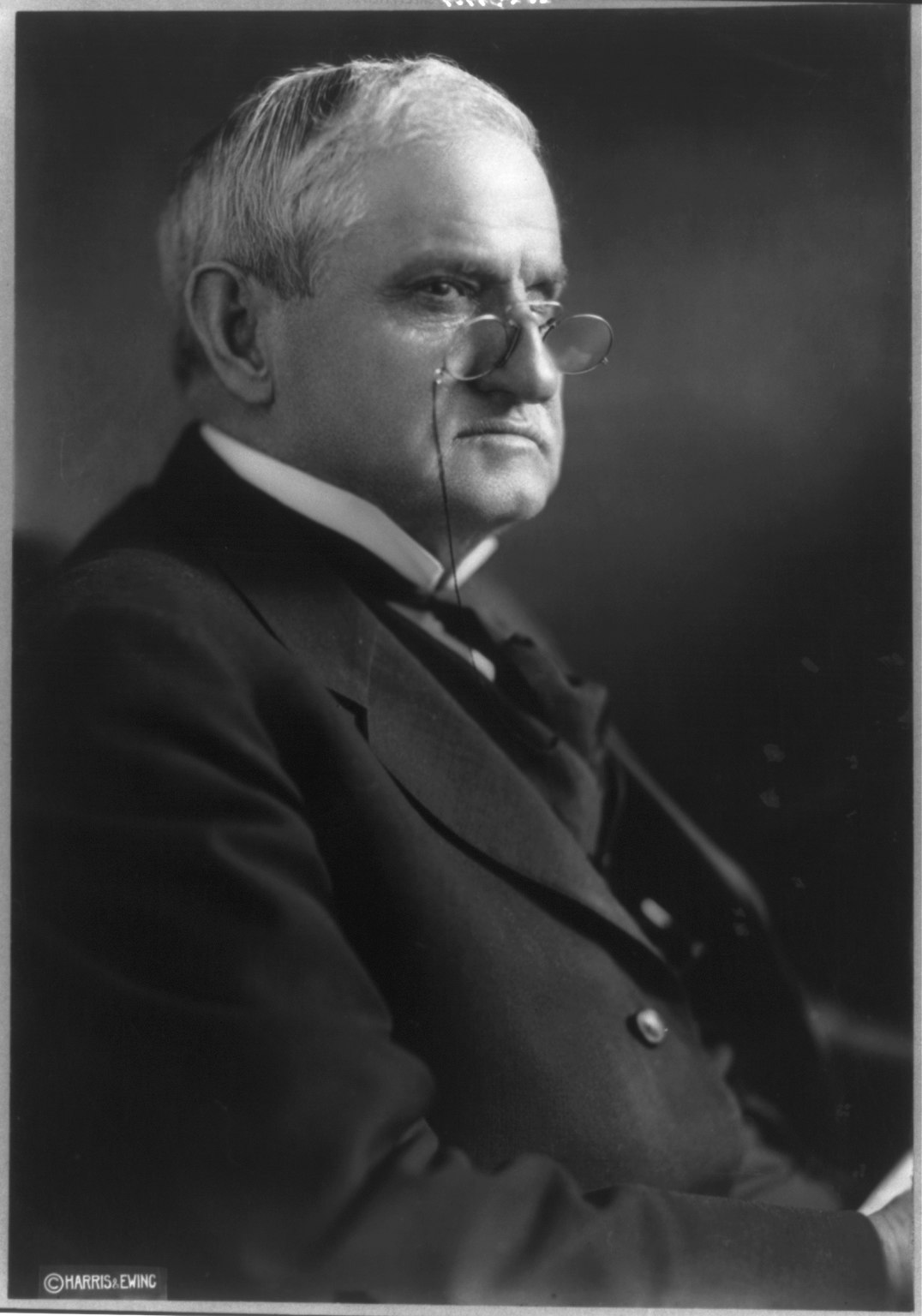
Tillman in 1918, shortly before his death

President Woodrow Wilson was inaugurated in 1913, the first Democrat to hold the office since Cleveland. Tillman supported Wilson's legislation in the Senate, except on women's suffrage, where he was a strong opponent. He was uneasy when Wilson's Secretary of State, Bryan, tried to prevent war through treaty-making, describing the former presidential candidate as the "evangel of peace at any price". When the United States entered World War I, Tillman was a strong supporter, seeing the conflict as democratic nations against German "slaves ... and not free men at all". Although he urged vigilance against spies, once he was satisfied that the accusations against German-born Friedrich Johannes Hugo von Engelken, president of the Federal Land Bank at Columbia, were unfounded, he spoke in support of the man.

Tillman had been re-elected in 1901 and 1907. By 1912, the Democratic nominee, who would be elected by the overwhelming Democratic majority in the legislature, was determined by a primary. A primary was also used for governor, and Tillman ran at the same time as Governor Cole Blease, who also sought re-election. Blease, also an outspoken white supremacist, had entered politics as a Tillmanite legislator in 1890, and, breaking from him, adopted similar techniques to Tillman's to appeal to poor farm workers and mill hands. Tillman faced two opponents in his re-nomination bid—his control over South Carolina politics had deteriorated over the years, and he had moved towards the Conservatives. He had not endorsed Blease in 1910. The two men reached an agreement that Tillman would remain neutral in the governor's race in 1912, but Tillman became convinced Blease could not win against former state chief justice Ira B. Jones. Both sides claimed to have letters from Tillman endorsing their candidate, but three days before the primary, Tillman condemned Blease and endorsed Jones. Blease, outraged, alleged betrayal, accused Tillman of "insane jealousy", and said of the senator, "possibly his mind has become more diseased of late than it was when I had my last talk with his confidential physician". Both men were re-elected.

=== Final years and death ===
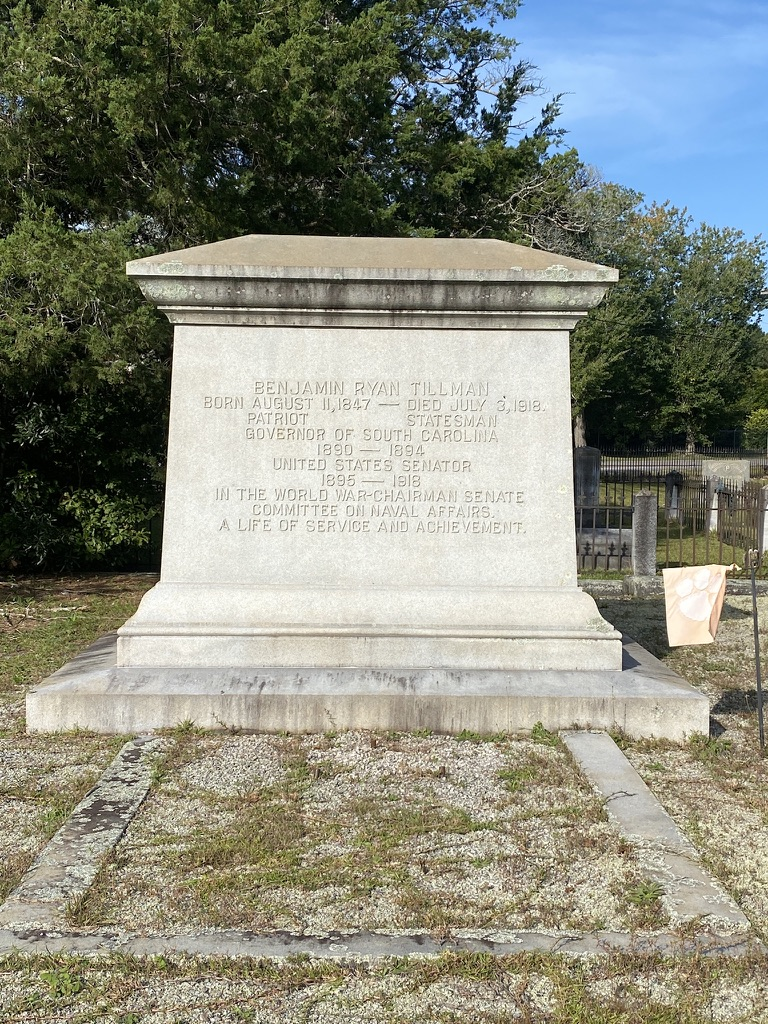
Tillman's grave, Trenton, South Carolina. Seen in 2020.

The Seventeenth Amendment, ratified in 1913, gave the people the right to elect senators, but this made little difference in South Carolina, where the Democratic primary remained decisive. Tillman in 1914 announced plans to retire when his term expired in 1919, but the war and the threat that Blease would win the open seat caused him to announce his candidacy for a fifth term in March 1918. Tillman remained for the most part in Washington, and did not campaign, but came to Columbia for the state Democratic convention in May to discredit rumors about his health, which was indeed poor. He got Wilson to persuade one of his rivals, Congressman Asbury F. Lever, to abandon the race, and considered how to do the same to Blease. These plans had not yet come to fruition when Tillman was stricken by a cerebral hemorrhage at the end of June, and died July 3, 1918, in Washington, D.C. He is buried in Ebenezer Cemetery, Trenton, South Carolina.

Tillman's death generated a large number of tributes to him in the Senate, which were afterwards collected in book form. One copy came into the hands of Blease, who was angry that Tillman was being lauded, and stated that the late senator was not what he had seemed. He wrote in front of the volume, "Don't believe me, but look up his life & see." When Manly, who had barely escaped the Wilmington massacre, read of his death in 1918, he said to his wife, "I wonder who is making hash out of him in hell tonight."

== Legacy and historical view ==
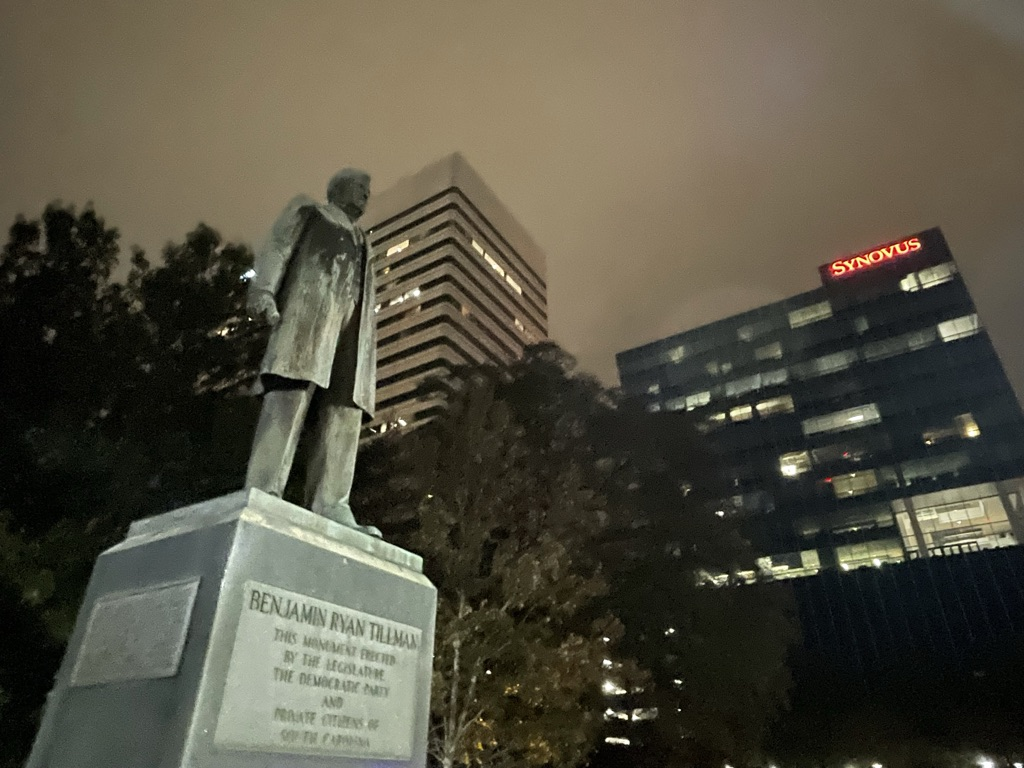
Statue of Benjamin Tillman on the grounds of the South Carolina Statehouse.

According to Orville Burton, "Tillman's legacy for South Carolina and the nation is controversial and disturbing. White and black South Carolinians interpret Tillman's accomplishments in contradictory ways." A national hero to white supremacists, according to an article on Tillman for The Journal of Blacks in Higher Education, "for African Americans, he was the 'devil incarnate'". No African American was elected to Congress under the 1895 constitution until the civil rights movement, nor were any elected to statewide or county office after 1900.

Simkins, a son of Edgefield, while recognizing faults in Tillman's racial policies, stated that "no South Carolinian, with the single exception of Calhoun, has ever made a profounder impression on his generation than Tillman." The late senator's supporters and protégés remained long in South Carolina, encouraging a view of Tillman as a great man in state and national history. James F. Byrnes, for example, repeated Tillman's themes of race war on the floor of the House of Representatives in 1919. In 1940, Byrnes, by then a senator and soon to sit on the U.S. Supreme Court, dedicated a statue of Tillman outside the South Carolina State House and called him the state's "first New Dealer". Protestors have since asked for that statue to be removed. Others who knew and at one time admired Tillman included Strom Thurmond, son of Tillman's Edgefield attorney, who saw and was inspired by Tillman's campaigning style as a boy. Other Southerners were highly negative: Lyndon B. Johnson said of Tillman, "He might have been president. I'd like to sit down with him and ask how it was to throw it away for the sake of hating."

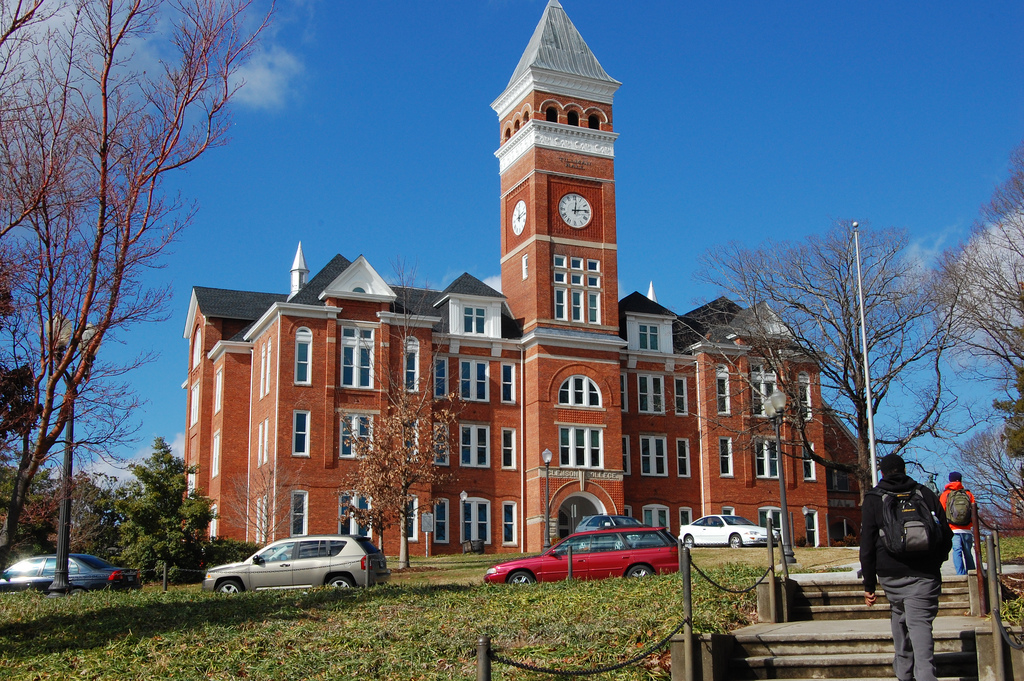
Clemson University's Tillman Hall

Simkins noted that Tillman "rose above the handicap of his radical views, his obstreperousness, and the insularity of his issues to become a considerable force in national politics". Historian I. M. Newby deemed Tillmanism the closest thing to a mass movement in the history of white South Carolinians, and one that dominated the state for a generation. "To students of black history and racial equality its most striking features are the extent to which it expressed the desire of white Carolinians to dominate blacks and the fact that much of its unity and force derived from its antiblack racial policies." Tillman's movement took power from the Bourbon Democrats in South Carolina, but a greater price was paid, electorally and in lives, by African Americans.

In 1962, Main Building on the campus of Winthrop College was renamed Tillman Hall in his honor. On June 19, 2020, Winthrop University's Board of Trustees passed unanimously a resolution requesting South Carolina state legislators to consider amending the Heritage Act of 2000 to "allow Winthrop to restore Tillman Hall to its original name of Main Building." Clemson University also has a Tillman Hall, though efforts have been made to change the name, and on June 12, 2020, the university's board of trustees requested the legislature to authorize a name change back to "Main Building". Kantrowitz argued that Tillman deserves little credit for what have become important Southern schools, integrated and coeducational:

For through the doors of Tillman Hall now pass men and women whose paths stretch back to many continents, men and women who understand the right to wage political struggles without fear of violent retaliation. In this, Clemson repudiates rather than represents Tillman's legacy. He would have torn down his beloved "farmers' college" brick by brick before he would have allowed it to foster a world where neither sex nor race defined the limits of a person's attainment.

== Bibliography ==
- Begley, Paul R. (April 1988). "Governor Richardson Faces the Tillman Challenge". The South Carolina Historical Magazine. 89 (2): 119–126. JSTOR 27654607.
- Bensel, Richard Franklin (2008). Passion and Preferences: William Jennings Bryan and the 1896 Democratic National Convention. Cambridge University Press. ISBN 978-0521717625.
- Clark, E. Culpepper (November 1983). "Pitchfork Ben Tillman and the Emergence of Southern Demagoguery" (PDF). Quarterly Journal of Speech. 69 (4): 423–433. doi:10.1080/00335638309383667. Archived from the original (PDF) on October 27, 2014.
- Coletta, Paulo E. (1964). William Jennings Bryan: Political Evangelist, 1860–1908. University of Nebraska Press. ISBN 978-0803200227.
- Cooper, William J. Jr. (October 1972). "Economics or Race: An Analysis of the Gubernatorial Election of 1890 in South Carolina". The South Carolina Historical Magazine. 73 (4): 209–219. JSTOR 27567146.
- Ford, Lacy K. Jr. (October 1997). "Origins of the Edgefield Tradition: The Late Antebellum Experience and the Roots of Political Insurgency". The South Carolina Historical Magazine. 98 (4): 328–348. JSTOR 27570267.
- Jones, Stanley L. (1964). The Presidential Election of 1896. University of Wisconsin Press. OCLC 445683.
- Kantrowitz, Stephen (August 2000). "Ben Tillman and Hendrix McLane, Agrarian Rebels: White Manhood, 'The Farmers,' and the Limits of Southern Populism". The Journal of Southern History. 66 (3): 497–524. doi:10.2307/2587866. JSTOR 2587866. Archived from the original on June 28, 2011 – via Questia.
- Kantrowitz, Stephen (2000). Ben Tillman and the Reconstruction of White Supremacy. University of North Carolina Press. ISBN 978-0807825303.
- Kazin, Michael (2006). A Godly Hero: The Life of William Jennings Bryan. Alfred A. Knopf. ISBN 978-0375411359.
- McGhee, Zach (September 1906). "Tillman, Smasher of Traditions". The World's Work. pp. 8013–8020.
- Miller, Jeffrey W. (Fall 2002). "Redemption through Violence: White Mobs and Black Citizenship in Albion Tourgée's A Fool's Errand". The Southern Literary Journal. 35 (1): 14–27. doi:10.1353/slj.2003.0011. JSTOR 20078347. S2CID 153523492.
- Morgan, H. Wayne (1969). From Hayes to McKinley: National Party Politics, 1877–1896. Syracuse University Press. ISBN 978-0815621362.
- Perkins, Lindsey S. (1948). "The Oratory of Benjamin Ryan Tillman". Speech Monographs. XV (1): 1–18. doi:10.1080/03637754809374940.
- "'Pitchfork' Ben Tillman: The Most Lionized Figure in South Carolina History". The Journal of Blacks in Higher Education (58): 38–39. Winter 2007–2008. JSTOR 25073824.
- Simkins, Francis Butler (May 1937). "Ben Tillman's View of the Negro". The Journal of Southern History. 3 (2): 161–174. doi:10.2307/2191880. JSTOR 2191880.
- Simkins, Francis Butler (1944). Pitchfork Ben Tillman, South Carolinian (first paperback ed.). Louisiana State University Press. OCLC 1877696. online, a major scholarly biography
- Stone, Clarence N. (January 1963). "Bleaseism and the 1912 Election in South Carolina". The North Carolina Historical Review. 40 (1): 54–74. JSTOR 23517346.
- Tillman, Benjamin R. (1907). The Race Problem. Struggles of '76. unknown. OCLC 1174778.
- Tillman, Benjamin R. (1909). The Struggles of '76. unknown. OCLC 10148685.
- Tindall, George B. (July 1952). "The Question of Race in the South Carolina Constitutional Convention of 1895". The Journal of Negro History. 37 (3): 277–303. doi:10.2307/2715494. JSTOR 2715494. S2CID 149809267.
- Zucchino, David (2020). Wilmington's Lie: The Murderous Coup of 1898 and the Rise of White Supremacy. Atlantic Monthly Press. ISBN 978-0802128386.

Party political offices
Preceded by John Peter Richardson III	Democratic nominee for Governor of South Carolina; 1890, 1892	Succeeded by John Gary Evans
First	Democratic nominee for U.S. Senator from South Carolina (Class 2); 1900, 1906, 1912	Succeeded by Nathaniel B. Dial
Political offices
Preceded by John Peter Richardson III	Governor of South Carolina; 1890–1894	Succeeded by John Gary Evans
U.S. Senate
Preceded by Matthew Butler	U.S. Senator (Class 2) from South Carolina; 1895–1918; Served alongside: John L. M. Irby, Joseph H. Earle, John L. McLaurin, Asbury Latimer, Frank B. Gary, Ellison D. Smith	Succeeded by Christie Benet
Preceded by George Perkins	Chair of the Senate Naval Affairs Committee; 1913–1918	Succeeded by Claude A. Swanson
