= Painting and Travel with Roger and Sarah Bansemer =

American television series

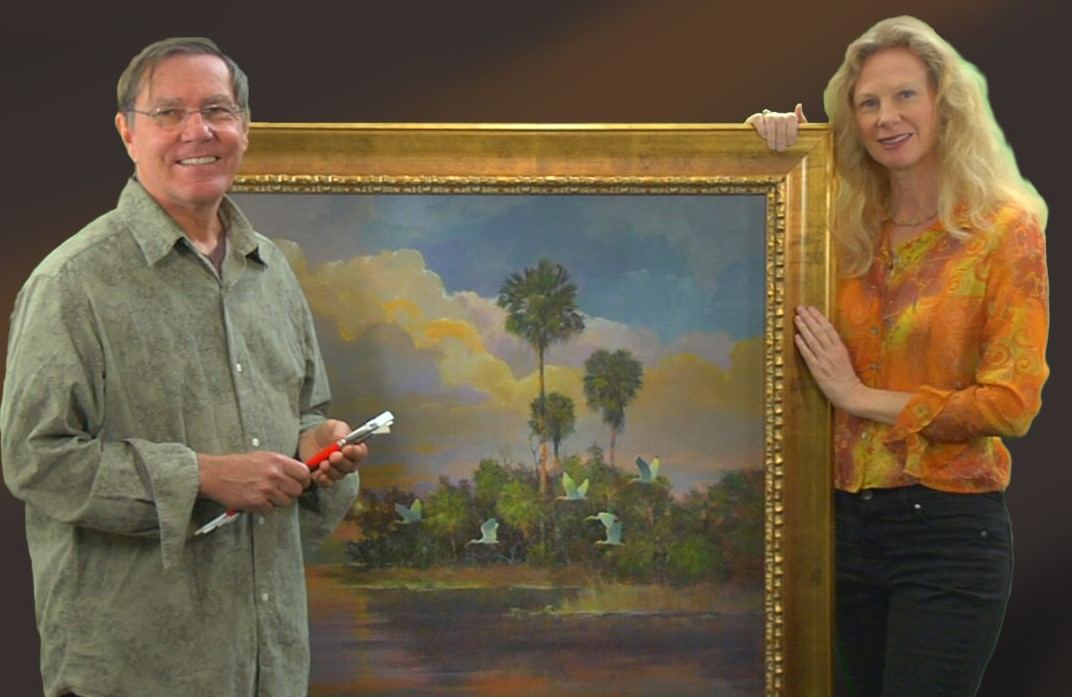
- Roger and Sarah Bansemer pose with a large Florida environmental painting
- Presented by: Roger and Sarah Bansemer
- Country of origin: United States
- Original language: English

Painting and Travel is an educational television show produced by Roger and Sarah Bansemer. It is broadcast primarily on PBS channels and has found a place in the ranks of PBS educational painting series Bob Ross and The Joy of Painting and Paint This with Jerry Yarnell. The show has aired on 320 television stations.

A typical episode begins with Sarah narrating a video tour of the filming location, which is chosen for its scenic or historic interest. The video tour ends with an introduction to Roger's painting project for the episode. Roger then demonstrates the painting process and teaches painting principles as he does so. His painting demonstration is usually interrupted by Sarah interviewing someone in the area. Most of the paintings are seascapes and rural scenes. Roger paints in acrylics and oils, in the impressionist style. All episodes are 30 minutes in length.

== Series overview ==
Season	Episodes	Originally released
1	13	January 31, 2011
2	13	August 21, 2011
3	13	January 30, 2012
4	13	November 5, 2012
5	13	August 19, 2013
6	13	June 9, 2014
7	13	March 30, 2015
8	13	March 14, 2016
9	13	March 27, 2017
10	13	April 27, 2018

== Season 1 (2011) ==
Painting and Travel Episodes
No. overall	No. in season	Title	Original release date
1	1	"Independence Mine"	January 31, 2011
A painting, in oils, of a gold mine in Victor, Colorado. Sarah visits the historic town of Victor, Colorado.
2	2	"Cross Creek"	February 7, 2011
A painting, in acrylics, of the home of famous author Marjorie Kinnan Rawlings in Cross Creek, Florida. Sarah gets a guided tour of the house and ground.
3	3	"The Saddle"	February 14, 2011
A painting, in acrylics, of a saddle at a ranch in Colorado. Sarah tours the ranch on horseback.
4	4	"1931 Cord"	February 21, 2011
A painting done at the Auburn, Cord, Duesenberg Automobile Museum in Auburn, Indiana. Sarah tours the museum and its automobile collection.
5	5	"Santa Fe"	February 28, 2011
Roger Bansemer & David Darrow paint together on location just outside Santa Fe, New Mexico. The two artists discuss plein air painting and composition. Sarah visits one of the fine galleries in Santa Fe.
6	6	"The Shrimp Boat"	March 7, 2011
A painting, in acrylics, of an old worn shrimp boat in Tarpon Springs, Florida. Sarah tours this Tarpon Springs.
7	7	"The Burning Man"	March 14, 2011
A landscape painting of the Burning Man in Nevada. Sarah interviews the Flaming Lotus Girls who created a large stainless steel sculpture for the event.
8	8	"The Tavaras Boat Show"	March 21, 2011
A landscape of an antique cruise boat. Sarah tours the exhibition and rides in an AmphiCar.
9	9	"Alligator Creek"	March 28, 2011
A painting of a small waterfall and surrounding landscape at Roger's studio in Clearwater, Florida. Roger tours the house and his antique railroad caboose.
10	10	"Lake Michigan"	April 4, 2011
A painting, in acrylics, of Lake Michigan near South Haven, Michigan. Sarah tours an antique fishing vessel and learns about Great Lake fishing.
11	11	"Caladesi Island"	April 11, 2011
A painting of a beach scene on a grey day at Caladesi Island off the coast of Clearwater, Florida. Sarah visits the state park and its beautiful beaches.
12	12	"Wupatki"	April 18, 2011
A painting of a 900 year old pueblo at the Wupatki National Monument in Arizona. Sarah interviews a member of the Hopi Nation as they tour the Pueblo.
13	13	"The Lanier Mansion"	April 25, 2011
A painting, in acrylics, of the Lanier Mansion in Madison, Indiana. Sarah tours the mansion.

== Season 2 (2011) ==
Painting and Travel Episodes
No. overall	No. in season	Title	Original release date
14	1	"The St. Marks Lighthouse"	August 1, 2011
A painting, in acrylics, of a lighthouse. Sarah tours the town of St. Marks, Florida (South of Tallahassee).
15	2	"Locomotive 2152"	August 8, 2011
A painting, in acrylics, of a locomotive at the Kentucky Railway Museum. Sarah tours the museum and explores the workings of a steam locomotive.
16	3	"The Torreon"	August 15, 2011
A painting of an historic fort in Lincoln, New Mexico called a Torreon. Sarah tours the courthouse where Billy The Kid was held prisoner.
17	4	"The Hay Bales"	August 22, 2011
A painting, in acrylics, of a small shed and bales of hay on a farm in Kentucky. Sarah tours the stained glass studio of Marvin Jarboe.
18	5	"The White Rose"	August 29, 2011
A painting, in acrylics, of a small white rose in the gardens at the Baha'i House of Worship in Wilmette, Illinois. Sarah visits the temple and learns more about the Baha'i Faith.
19	6	"The Withlacoochee River"	September 5, 2011
A painting, in acrylics, of a river scene from a pontoon boat near Yankeetown, Florida. Sarah tours the village of Yankeetown.
20	7	"Oz"	September 12, 2011
A painting, in oils, of a 100 year old feed store in Kansas. Sarah visits the nearby Wizard of Oz museum.
21	8	"The Shed"	September 19, 2011
A painting of an old metal shed and landscape on a farm in Brooksville, Florida. Sarah visits the nearby town of Brooksville.
22	9	"Burning Man - Center Camp"	September 26, 2011
A painting of view inside the crowded center camp tent at the famous Burning Man, in Nevada. Sarah interviews the owner of the Neverwas vehicle, a very special art car.
23	10	"Red Ryder"	October 3, 2011
A painting of an old school house in Pagosa Springs, Colorado at the Fred Harman Museum where the famous Red Ryder comic was created. Sarah tours the museum and talks with Fred Harmon III.
24	11	"The Yellow House"	October 10, 2011
A painting, in acrylics, of the beach at the Cayman Islands. Sarah tours the unique business district of George Town.
25	12	"Teepee"	October 17, 2011
A painting, in acrylics, featuring a Teepee in Colorado. Sarah takes a train trip through the Royal Gorge in Cañon City, Colorado.
26	13	"The Amish Farm"	October 24, 2011
A painting of an Amish farm near Shipshewana, Indiana. Sarah visits an Amish vegetable market and talks with an Amish farmer.

== Season 3 (2012) ==
Painting and Travel Episodes
No. overall	No. in season	Title	Original release date
27	1	"Clapboard Island"	January 30, 2012
A painting with a nautical theme on an 80 acre island in Maine. Sarah talks with the owner of the historic cottage.
28	2	"The Mississippi River"	February 6, 2012
A painting of a view of the Mississippi River. Sarah tours Natchez, Vicksburg, and Memphis.
29	3	"Heritage Village"	February 13, 2012
A painting of the interior of an historic pioneer home on the west coast of Florida, near Clearwater. Sarah tours the village and the many exhibits.
30	4	"St. Thomas Courtyard"	February 20, 2012
A painting of a courtyard.
31	5	"Cape Porpoise"	February 27, 2012
A painting of a harbor scene with lobster boats. Sarah interviews a lobsterman.
32	6	"The Mountain Valley"	March 5, 2012
A painting of a river valley in the foothills of the Blue Ridge Mountains in North Carolina. Sarah tours the historic Mass General store.
33	7	"The Hudson River"	March 12, 2012
Artist James Gurney, author of Dinotopia, paints on the Hudson River with Roger. Sarah interviews James about his best selling books, the creation of his illustrations and his paintings.
34	8	"Grandfather's House"	March 19, 2012
A painting of a hundred year old house in Ipswitch, Massachusetts where Sarah's grandparents and their six children once lived.
36	10	"The Watering Can"	March 19, 2012
Roger and well renowned artist Gary Akers paint a watering can just outside Gary's studio in Maine. Sarah talks with Gary about working with gouache and water colors.
37	11	"Wooden Boat School"	April 9, 2012
A painting of a scene near the Wooden Boat School in Brooklin, Maine. Sarah tours the classes where wooden boats are being built.
38	12	"Roosevelt & Rufus"	April 16, 2012
A painting of Rufus the carriage horse in St. Augustine, Florida. Sarah tours the town with Roosevelt, the carriage driver.
39	13	"Portland Head Lighthouse"	April 23, 2012
A painting of a lighthouse in Portland, Maine. Sarah interviews the lighthouse director.

== Season 4 (2012-2013) ==
Painting and Travel Episodes
No. overall	No. in season	Title	Original release date
40	1	"Historical Apalachicola"	November 5, 2012
A painting of an old boat in bad disrepair, but with lots of character in Apalachicola, Florida. Sarah learns more about Apalachicola and its history.
41	2	"The Vintage Airstream"	November 12, 2012
A painting, in acrylics, of an antique Airstream near Tampa, Florida. Sarah talks with the president of Airstream while at the Tampa RV show.
42	3	"The Forgotten Coast"	November 19, 2012
A painting of an old forgotten shed in Eastpoint, Florida, near Apalachicola . This is where 90% of all oysters are harvested in Florida. Sarah tours nearby St. George Island.
43	4	"Fatty's Antique Auto, part 1"	November 26, 2012
Part 1 of a 2 part program. A painting of a car once owned by silent film actor Fatty Arbuckle. Sarah talks with the owner as they sit in the back of this fabulous automobile.
44	5	"Fatty's Antique Auto, part 2"	December 3, 2012
Conclusion of the painting of a car once owned by actor Fatty Arbuckle.
45	6	"The Wharf at Carrabelle"	December 10, 2012
A painting of a wharf in Carrabelle, Florida which is in the panhandle. Sarah boards the antique sloop named Governor Stone.
46	7	"The 17th Fairway"	December 17, 2012
A painting of the famous 17th hole at Sawgrass, in Florida, just after the PGA tour. Sarah interviews broadcaster Bob Bubka.
47	8	"The Vanderhorst Plantation"	December 24, 2012
A painting of a tree covered road leading to the Vanderhorst Plantation on Kiawah Island, South Carolina. Sarah tours the plantation house and learns of its history.
49	10	"The St. Augustine Lighthouse"	January 7, 2013
A painting of a lighthouse. Sarah tours the lighthouse and goes inside the 9' tall Fresnel lens.
50	11	"Mokita-The Yorkshire Terrier"	January 14, 2013
A portrait of a Yorkshire terrier. Sarah talks with a vet about this breed of dog.
51	12	"Marsh at Franklin County"	January 21, 2013
A painting of a marsh scene in Carrabelle, Florida. Sarah visits nearby Dog Island.
52	13	"The Round Barn"	January 28, 2013
A painting, in acrylics, of at a 100 year old barn in Ohio. Sarah tours the inside of the barn.

== Season 5 (2013) ==
Painting and Travel Episodes
No. overall	No. in season	Title	Original release date
53	1	"Emert's Cove"	August 19, 2013
A painting of a view in the Smoky Mountains near Pittman Center, Tennessee. Sarah visits a nearby covered bridge.
54	2	"The Nassau Lighthouse"	August 19, 2013
A studio painting, in oils, of the Nassau Lighthouse. Sarah meets a street artist in the Bahamas.
55	3	"The Red Dairy Barn Part 1"	August 26, 2013
A painting, in acrylics, of a barn in the foothills of Kentucky.
56	4	"The Red Dairy Barn Part 2"	September 9, 2013
The conclusion of the painting of the red barn. Sarah takes a tour of the farm.
57	5	"Tiger Point Marina"	September 16, 2013
A painting, in acrylics, of a marsh scene in Fernandina, Florida. Sarah talks with the boat yard's owner.
58	6	"Summer Roses"	September 23, 2013
A studio painting done in oils of roses on a pickett fence. Sarah visits a garden in Maine.
59	7	"The Bird House"	September 30, 2013
A painting, in acrylics, of a bird house. Sarah visits artist Rolf Holmquist, a maker of unique birdhouses.
60	8	"Gloucester Dory Boats"	October 7, 2013
A painting, in oils, of three dory boats. Sarah visits the Fishermans Memorial in Gloucester.
61	9	"Brunswick's Waterfront"	October 14, 2013
A painting of a Victorian style structure and palm trees, in Brunswick, Georgia.
62	10	"The McKenry Farm"	October 21, 2013
A painting, in acrylics, of the McKenry Farm in Tennessee. Sarah tours the farm.
63	11	"The Pottery Studio"	October 28, 2013
A painting of the studio of potter David Vorhees in North Carolina. Sarah talks with David about his wood fired kiln.
64	12	"Rota The Lion"	November 4, 2013
A painting, in acrylics, of a lion which was once the mascot to Winston Churchill. Roger begins the painting in the Lightner Museum then totally reworks it later, in his studio. Sarah talks with the curator about the Lion and a desk owned by Louis Bonapartes brother.
65	13	"Matanzas Waterfront"	November 11, 2013
A painting of a beachscape. Sarah kayaks in the wetlands around St. Augustine, Florida.

== Season 6 (2014) ==
Painting and Travel Episodes
No. overall	No. in season	Title	Original release date
66	1	"Glacier National Park"	June 9, 2014
A 3x4' painting, in oils, of Glacier National Park in Montana. Sarah does the travelogue in the park.
67	2	"The Sod Roofed Cabin"	June 16, 2014
A painting, in acrylics, of a unique sod-roofed house, at the Miracle of America Museum in Polson, Montana. Sarah talks with the owner of the museum.
68	3	"The Steam Tractor"	June 23, 2014
A large painting, in oils, of a steam-powered tractor at the Miracle of America Museum in Polson, Montana. Sarah takes a ride on the vehicle.
69	4	"The Button Factory"	June 30, 2014
A painting, in acrylics, of two old buildings on the Mississippi River where buttons were once made with clam shells. Sarah interviews the lockmaster as a barge enters the lock.
70	5	"Devils Tower"	July 7, 2014
A painting, in acrylics, of Devils Tower, Wyoming. Sarah talks with renowned rock climber Frank Sanders.
71	6	"The Sheep Wagon"	July 14, 2014
A painting, in acrylics, of an antique sheep wagon, in Wyoming. Sarah talks with the owner about the wagon.
72	7	"The Lochsa River"	July 21, 2014
A painting, in oils, of the Lochsa River, in Idaho. Sarah walks in the campground and learns about this area, where Lewis and Clark once traveled.
73	8	"The Church on the Hill"	July 28, 2014
A large painting, in oils, of a church in Philipsburg, Montana. Sarah visits Philipsburg.
74	9	"Buffalo"	August 4, 2014
A painting of a buffalo. Sarah tours the National Bison Refuge in Montana.
75	10	"El Galeon"	August 11, 2014
A 3x3' painting, in oils, of a Spanish Galeon. Sarah boards the ship and learns more of its history.
76	11	"Shore Bird Murals"	August 18, 2014
4×8 ft murals of shorebirds. Sarah visits a rookery where many birds are nesting.
77	12	"The Antique Saloon Lantern"	August 25, 2014
A painting, in acrylics, of an antique lantern. Sarah visits artist Bob Coronato who describes the process of making etchings.
78	13	"Sioux Moccasins"	September 1, 2014
A painting, in acrylics, of a pair of Indian moccasins with all their beadwork. Sarah visits artist Bob Coronato and his museum housing Indian artifacts.

== Season 7 (2015) ==
Painting and Travel Episodes
No. overall	No. in season	Title	Original release date
79	1	"Sand Point Lighthouse"	March 30, 2015
A painting of a lighthouse in Escanaba, Michigan, on Lake Michigan. Sarah tours the lighthouse and talks with the director about its history.
80	2	"The Ingwersen Barn"	April 6, 2015
A painting of one of the barns on the property of artist James Ingwersen, in acrylics. Roger and Sarah visit renowned portrait artist James Ingwersen at his studio in Minnesota where Sarah talks with him about his career and thoughts on portraiture.
81	3	"The Schooner"	April 13, 2015
A painting of a rocky harbor scene, near Grand Marais, Minnesota, in acrylics. Sarah talks with the director of the North House Folk School about the schooner that sails the waters of Lake Superior.
82	4	"The Bad Lands"	April 20, 2015
Despite the description, this painting focuses on some flowers in the Bad Lands of South Dakota. Sarah tours parts of the area.
83	5	"The Long Driveway"	April 27, 2015
A painting of a long driveway at a farm, in oils. Then Sarah visits the Jack Richeson Company where oil paints are made.
84	6	"The Beaver Dam"	May 4, 2015
A painting of a beaver dam in Grand Marais, Minnesota. Sarah takes part in the dragon boat races nearby in the harbor.
85	7	"Iron Ore Docks"	May 11, 2015
An acrylic painting by the shores of Lake Superior. Sarah visits the town and an antique tug boat.
86	8	"The Carousel Horse"	May 18, 2015
A painting of carousel horses in acrylics. Sarah explores the hand-carved animals on the carousel and their history.
87	9	"Cascade Falls"	May 25, 2015
A painting, in acrylics, of Cascade Falls, located in Grand Marais, Minnesota. Sarah visits plein air artist Neil Sherman who lives in Grand Marais.
88	10	"The Gill Net Fishing Boat"	June 1, 2015
A painting, in acrylics of an unusually shaped fishing boat used on the Great Lakes. Sarah tours a village and fish processing plant.
89	11	"Costa Maya"	June 8, 2015
A seascape painting on a beach at Costa Maya, Mexico. Sarah tours the beach town of Costa Maya.
90	12	"Mulberry Farm"	June 15, 2015
A painting of a barn at Mulberry Farm in Wisconsin, in acrylics. Sarah talks with one of the owners of the farm.
91	13	"Split Rock Lighthouse"	June 22, 2015
A painting of a lighthouse about 40 miles north of Duluth, Minnesota, on Lake Superior. Sarah also takes a tour of the light with the lighthouse keeper.

== Season 8 (2016) ==
Painting and Travel Episodes
No. overall	No. in season	Title	Original release date
92	1	"Roses of the Biltmore Estate"	March 14, 2016
An acrylic painting of a rose bouquet. Sarah tours the rose garden at the Biltmore Estate in Asheville, North Carolina.
93	2	"The Honey Jar"	March 21, 2016
A still life of a jar of honey in oils. Sarah visits a bee keeper in South Carolina who tells of his craft.
94	3	"Mountain Lake, part 1"	March 28, 2016
A view from a dock on Lake Lure, North Carolina in acrylics. Sarah takes a pontoon boat tour, and ride by scenic coves and summer cottages.
95	4	"Mountain Lake, part 2"	April 4, 2016
Conclusion of the "Mountain Lake" painting. Sarah views Lake Lure from high atop Chimney Rock State Park in the Western mountains of North Carolina.
96	5	"The Guitar Maker"	April 11, 2016
A portrait of a guitar maker laboring at his workbench. The painting is begun using acrylics and finished in oils. Sarah visits the work shop of a guitar and ukulele maker.
97	6	"The Ojibwe Teepee"	April 18, 2016
An acrylic painting of a birch bark teepee on the shores of Lake Superior, in Grand Portage, Minnesota. Sarah learns how an Ojibwe teepee is constructed using birch bark. She steps inside to see how the interior space is designed for comfort and livability.
98	7	"The Pumpkin"	April 25, 2016
An acrylic Still life of a pumpkin by an old wooden doorway on a Wisconsin farm. Sarah explores the farm that has a pumpkin patch containing six to seven thousand pumpkins. She talks with the farmer about the different varieties of pumpkins and the requirements for growing them.
99	8	"The Biltmore Gardens"	May 2, 2016
A landscape in oils of the Biltmore Estate Gardens in Asheville, North Carolina. Sarah tours the grounds of the Biltmore Estate.
100	9	"Apple Time"	May 9, 2016
A still life of a red and a green apple in acrylics. Sarah visits a North Carolina apple orchard.
101	10	"The Diesel Locomotive"	May 16, 2016
An oil painting of an aging diesel railroad locomotive in Hendersonville, North Carolina. Sarah visits the Apple Valley Model Railroad Club housed in the train depot.
102	11	"The Old Drilling Rig"	May 23, 2016
A painting of a weather-worn drilling truck at the World Museum of Mining. Sarah explores one of the world's most productive copper mines and old time mining days.
103	12	"Florida Palms"	May 30, 2016
More than 100 styles of easels are manufactured at the Jack Richeson & Co. in Wisconsin; an oil on canvas features a large tropical Florida landscape with palm trees and native shrubbery.
104	13	"Fort Mose"	June 6, 2016
Fort Mose in St. Augustine, Florida, was built in 1738 for freed slaves; an oil painting depicts a woman in period costume cooking an autumn feast over an open fire.

== Season 9 (2017) ==
Painting and Travel Episodes
No. overall	No. in season	Title	Original release date
105	1	"Inside Passage"	March 27, 2017
20x30 oil landscape using a palette of only three colors, in Ketchikan, Alaska. Sarah tours the Totem Bite State Park where she learns about the native totem poles.
106	2	"The Sea Turtle"	April 3, 2017
Portrait of a sea turtle in acrylics. Sarah visits the Whitney Laboratory for Marine Bioscience's Sea Turtle Hospital in St. Augustine, Florida where she learns about the care and rehabilitation of injured turtles.
107	3	"Todd's general store"	April 10, 2017
A visit to the small town of Todd, North Carolina; using acrylics to paint a general store in the early morning light. Sarah talks with a fine young musician on the porch of the general store.
108	4	"Castillo de San Marcos"	April 17, 2017
30x40 acrylic painting of the fort. Filmed in St. Augustine, Florida, where Sarah talks with the park ranger about the history of the fort.
109	5	"Hackberry on Rt 66"	April 24, 2017
24x36 oil painting of a rusty old car, in Hackberry, Arizona. Sarah visits a roadside stop on Rt 66 full of antiques and relics from the past, including old automobiles, a soda shop, and rusty signs.
110	6	"The Fly Fisherman - Part 1"	May 1, 2017
A 30x40 oil painting in the Blue Ridge Mountains of a fisherman and a mountain stream. Sarah talks to a professional fly fisherman as he fishes for trout in a mountain stream, catching trout using different casting methods.
111	7	"The Fly Fisherman - Part 2"	May 8, 2017
The conclusion of The Fly Fisherman painting, finishing the painting of a mountain stream.. Sarah talks with a skilled fly fisherman about the art of tying flies used in fly-fishing.
112	8	"The Dairy Cow"	May 15, 2017
Using acrylics to paint a dairy cow. Filmed in West Jefferson, North Carolina, Sarah tours the artistic town, visits a butchery, and interviews an artist at his opening.
113	9	"Dinosaur National Park"	May 22, 2017
11X14 acrylic painting in Roger's studio of a worn sandstone cliff. A visit to Dinosaur National Monument in Utah and Colorado. Sarah visits the ancient Petroglyphs and a hike into Box Canyon.
114	10	"The Great Egret"	May 29, 2017
30x40 oil painting of an egret perched high in a Florida cabbage palm. Birding in northeastern Florida. Sarah takes an eco-tour by boat with a naturalist viewing estuaries around St. Augustine, Florida.
115	11	"The Ponce de Leon Hotel"	June 5, 2017
30x30 oil painting, featuring the historic hotel with a rainy sky, pavement, and statue of Ponce de Leon. Aviles Street arts district; oldest schoolhouse; former Ponce de Leon Hotel. Sarah tours the hotel and learns of its history.
116	12	"Journey to titanic"	June 12, 2017
An expedition to the Titanic aboard the Russian research vessel Keldysh; creating original paintings with acrylics while hovering over the Titanic's bow.
117	13	"Skagway"	June 19, 2017
Oil painting of a downtown street scene in Skagway, Alaska. Sarah tours the town and takes a ride on the White Pass & Yukon Route Railroad.

== Season 10 (2018) ==
Painting and Travel Episodes
No. overall	No. in season	Title	Original release date
118	1	"Icebreaker Mackinaw"	April 27, 2018
Roger and Sarah travel up the eastern coast line of Michigan arriving in the village of Mackinaw City. Sarah tours a retired U. S. Coast Guard icebreaker and talks with an experienced engineer about the ships operations and past rescues. Roger uses oils on canvas to paint the Icebreaker Mackinaw in port.
119	2	"Christiansted"	May 4, 2018
Sarah and Roger visit Christiansted on the beautiful island of St. Croix. Sarah enjoys the sights and sounds of the breezy downtown and the sunny, tropical ocean views. Roger makes a few sketches on location of an historic church which he decides to paint back in the studio using acrylics.
120	3	"Ralph the Tiger"	May 11, 2018
Sarah and Roger are invited to visit a large cat rescue in Mims, Florida. The owner introduces Sarah to the youngest member, Ralph the Tiger. Sarah also meets the larger lions and tigers and learns about their diet and care. Roger takes pictures of the handsome cub back to his studio and paints Ralph's portrait.
121	4	"Cedar Key"	May 18, 2018
Roger and Sarah drive their motorhome to the quaint fishing village of Cedar Key, Florida to spend a few days enjoying art galleries and the local scene. Sarah learns some of the towns rich history while visiting the Cedar Key Historical Museum. Roger selects a wooden fishing boat and palm trees for a scene to paint in oils.
122	5	"Belle Isle"	May 25, 2018
Sarah and Roger stop in Detroit, Michigan to visit the renowned Detroit Institute of Arts later swinging by the famous Motown recording studio. They also explore Belle Isle Park and view the impressive city skyline. Roger chooses to paint the iconic fountain using oils on a large canvas back in his studio.
123	6	"Ketchikan"	June 1, 2018
Roger and Sarah cruise to Ketchikan, Alaska visiting the downtown area before heading off to Glacier Bay National Park. Roger paints a vessel in the marina used as a fishing tender when he returns to his studio. The cruise is peaceful and scenic along the way to the glacier field where they watch a glacier calving.
124	7	"Old Presque Isle Light House"	June 8, 2018
Painting and Travel tour the Old Presque Isle Light House on the shore of Michigan's Lake Huron. Sarah climbs the tower and visits the charming keepers house learning of its history and restoration. Roger uses acrylics to paint a birdseye view of the 38 foot tower and surrounding landscape.
125	8	"Blue Water Bridge"	June 15, 2018
Painting and Travel head north to Ontario Canada. Sarah spends time near the Blue Water Bridge at the Waterfront Park in Point Edward, Ontario where warm fall afternoons are enjoyed by locals and visitors. Roger sets up his easel and uses acrylics to create a panoramic landscape including the bridge from a seventh floor balcony.
126	9	"One Stop Buggy Shop - part 1"	June 22, 2018
Painting and Travel visit Amish country and the Miller Carriage Shop in Shipshewana, Indiana. Sarah talks with the owner of the hand built carriage business and watches the buggies being built to various stages of completion. Roger chooses to paint a landscape with one of the horse drawn carriages on a hilly country road.
127	10	"One Stop Buggy Shop - part 2"	June 29, 2018
Using acrylics Roger concludes his landscape painting of a horse drawn carriage on a rolling countryside lane in Shipshewana, Indiana. Sarah visits the auction house and huge flea market where many Amish shop and sell vegetables, fruits, and tasty baked goods. While speaking with a vender she learns about some changes in the Amish lifestyle that help them live in today's world.
128	11	"Sault Ste. Marie"	July 6, 2018
During a visit to Sault Ste. Marie, Michigan Roger does a plein air painting of a Great Lakes freighter heading towards the locks. He also paints a friendly Canada goose back at his studio. Sarah and Roger cross the International Bridge to the twin city in Ontario and tour the fascinating displays at the Canadian Bushplane Heritage Center.
129	12	"Sea Oats and Dunes"	July 13, 2018
Roger paints a seascape featuring sand dunes with sea oats using acrylics on board. Sarah takes a walk on the beach with Mic the rescue dog and later visits an environmental education center to learn about the importance of the dunes and other natural aspects of beach life.
123	13	"Balloon Festival"	July 20, 2018
Painting and Travel take to the air during the Albuquerque, New Mexico Hot Air Balloon Festival where hundreds of balloons come from around the world to participate. Roger describes the process of creating a 100 foot tall balloon mural on the side of a hotel. He also paints a scene of a colorful balloon in flight using acrylics.
