= Governor Lowndes =

Governor Lowndes may refer to:

- Lloyd Lowndes Jr. (1845–1905), 43rd Governor of Maryland
- Rawlins Lowndes (1721–1800), 32nd Governor of South Carolina
