= Vanderhorst Row =

Coordinates: 32°46′28.79″N 79°55′37.24″W

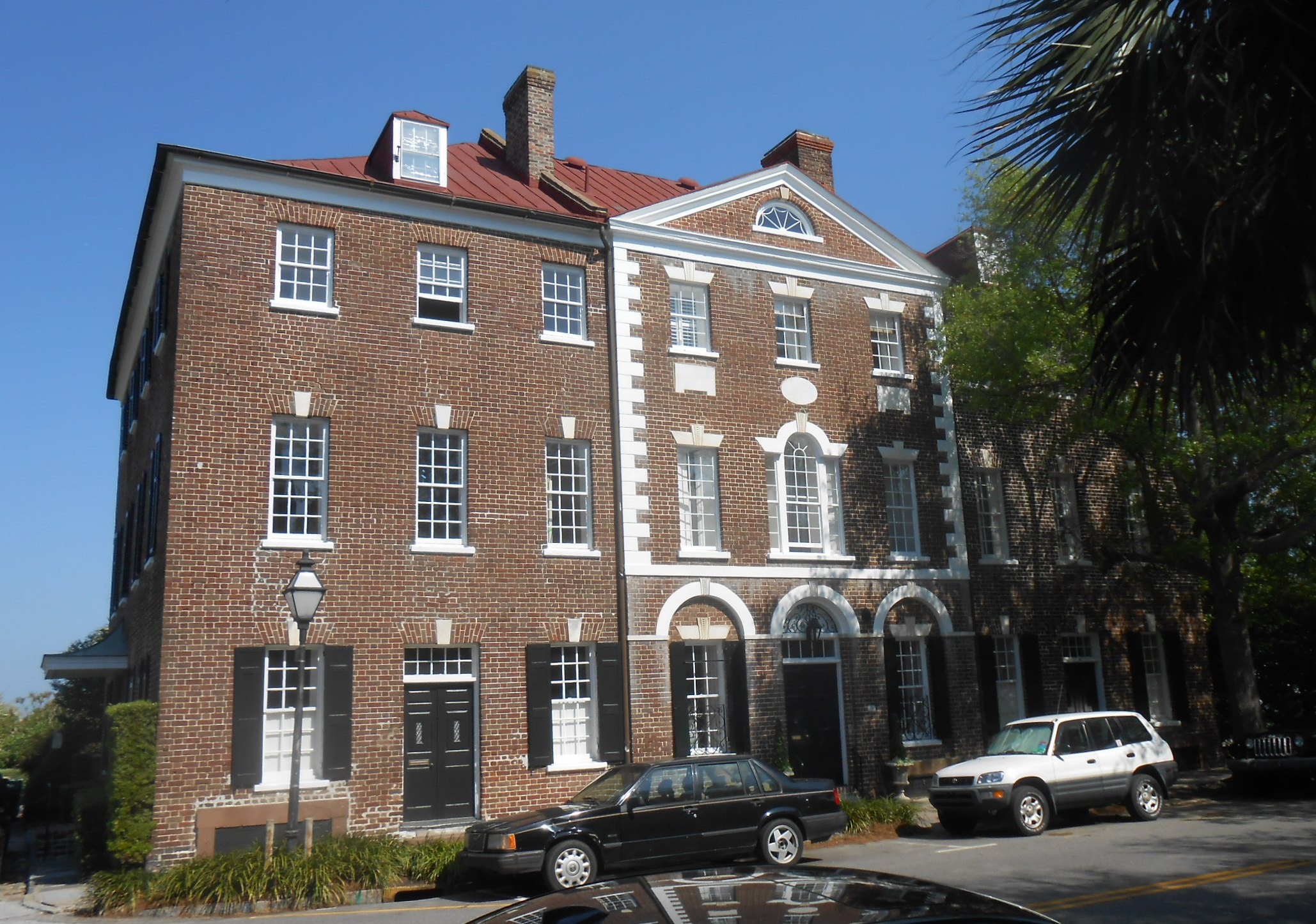
Vanderhorst Row, 76-80 East Bay Street, Charleston, South Carolina

Vanderhorst Row in Charleston, South Carolina is a three-unit residential building built in 1800 by Arnoldus Vanderhorst, a governor of South Carolina (1792-1794). Each unit is four floors. The units at the north and south end of the range have doors along East Bay Street on the front in addition to doors on the sides of the unified building and exits to the rear. After the Civil War, the use of the building changed, and commercial purposes were installed. The building fell into disrepair before it was bought in 1935 by Josiah E. Smith for a restoration which cost $30,000. The architect for the restoration of the building was Stephen Thomas. The three units rented for $1500 to $1800 a year after the work was completed. As restored, each unit had a living room, dining room, kitchen, breakfast room, and pantry on the first floor; a drawing room, bedroom, and bath on the second; two more bedrooms on the third; and servants' rooms in the attic. For many years after the restoration of the building, the central unit was rented by the Charleston Club for its headquarters; the club relocated to 53 East Bay Street in 1958.

A plat of Vanderhorst Row (76-80 East Bay Street) from 1806

== See also ==
- Arnoldus Vander Horst House
- Elias Vanderhorst House
