= Elias Vanderhorst House =

Mansion house in Charleston, South Carolina, U.S.

Coordinates: 32.79111°N 79.93252°W

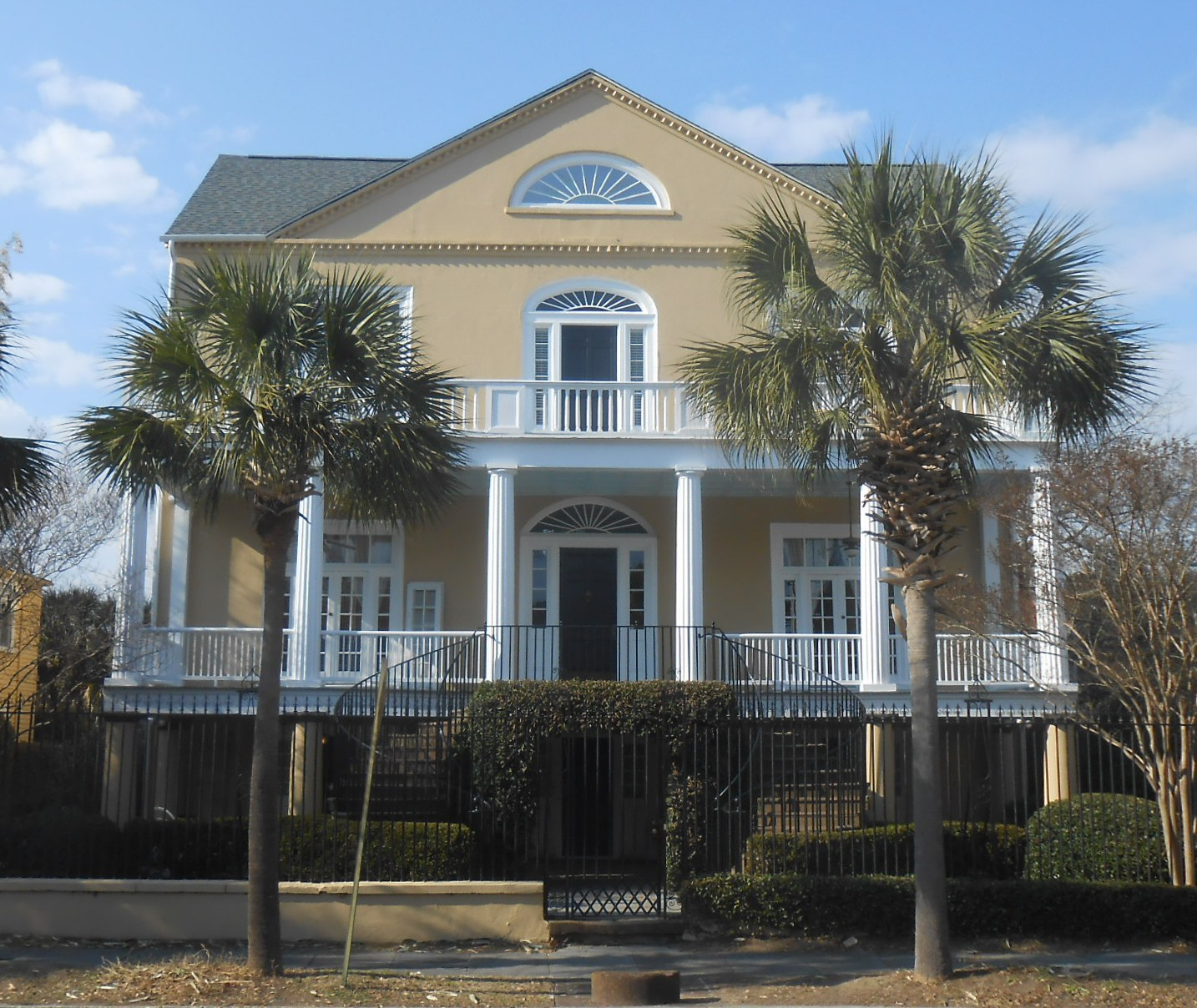
The Elias Vanderhorst House, 28 Chapel Street, Charleston, South Carolina

The Elias Vanderhorst House at 28 Chapel Street, Charleston, South Carolina, is a four-story mansion house which was built around 1835 as a home for members of the prominent Vanderhorst family of plantation owners.

== The house ==
Built in the Greek Revival style, the house stands on a high basement and features a porch across the front with six large columns and a double flight of stone steps leading to a piazza. Most of the original late federal woodwork is intact, along with some of the finest examples of wrought-iron in the city. The plot of land was purchased by the eponymous Elias Vanderhorst in 1832 and the house remained in his family for almost a century.

== The Vanderhorst family ==
Elias Vanderhorst, the builder of the house, was a fifth-generation member of a prominent South Carolina family. The Vanderhorst family was established in South Carolina towards the end of the 17th century by Baron Johannes Van Der Horst (1662-1717), a Dutch army officer who had accompanied William of Orange when he claimed the English throne during the Glorious Revolution of 1688 and who later emigrated to Charleston.

Baron Johannes van Der Horst's son, John Vanderhorst (1689-1739), was born in Charleston as part of the family's second generation in the city and had 12 children (the family's third generation in Charleston), including several who became notable in their own rights.

One son in the third generation, Arnoldus Vanderhorst I (1720-1765), was the father of Arnoldus Vanderhorst II (1748-1815) who developed the Vanderhorst House and plantation on Kiawah Island in South Carolina in the late 18th century. Arnoldus Vanderhorst II also served in the South Carolina militia during the Revolutionary War and later as Governor of South Carolina.

The Elias Vanderhorst who built this house was most likely his son, Elias Vanderhorst III (1780-1874), who lived for much of the time in Charleston at this residence. He inherited the Kiawah plantation and both properties were passed on to his own son, Arnoldus Vanderhorst IV (c. 1829-1881), who married Adele Allston Vanderhorst. She eventually owned the plantation and Elias Vanderhorst House, until she died in 1915.

== Later history of the house ==
Following the death of Adele Vanderhorst, the executors of her estate eventually concluded that the house should be sold. It was purchased for $6000 in 1928 by Dr. Ripon Wilson, who converted the building into apartments.

By the 1980s, the neighborhood had substantially deteriorated. In February 1983, the City of Charleston's Commission on Redevelopment and Preservation approved a plan to leverage federal community redevelopment funding as part of a program to offer relatively low interest loans for the renovation of 28 Chapel Street and the houses on either side. The work on all three houses was expected to cost $570,000 and had to be completed before December 31, 1983, to qualify for various tax benefits for the year.

The house has a historic marker erected by the Preservation Society of Charleston.

== Archives ==
Records of the Vanderhorst family are held at the South Carolina Historical Society, including documents related to this property. Further family papers are held at Bristol Archives.

== See also ==
- Vanderhorst Row
- Arnoldus Vander Horst House
