= Stephen Thomas =

Stephen Thomas may refer to:

- Stephen Thomas of Bosnia (c. 1411–1461), King of Bosnia, 1443–1461
- Stephen Thomas (Medal of Honor) (1809–1903), American Union Army officer and politician
- Stephen Thomas (rugby) (1865–1937), Welsh rugby union player
- Stephen Thomas (architect) (1892–1949), practiced mainly in Charleston, South Carolina
- Stephen Thomas (economist), professor of economics at the University of Greenwich Business School
- Stephen Thomas (sailor) (born 1977), Welsh Paralympic sailor

== See also ==
- Steven Thomas (disambiguation)
- Steve Thomas (disambiguation)
