= Thomas Jones (South Carolina mayor) =

Mayor of Charleston

5th Mayor of Charleston
- In office 1789–1790
- Preceded by: Rawlins Lowndes
- Succeeded by: Arnoldus Vanderhorst

Personal details
- Born: December 13, 1742
- Died: October 30, 1826 (aged 83)
- Spouse: Abigail Townsend (m. 1766)
- Children: Samuel B. Jones (1780-1813), Paul Townsend Jones (1787-1813)
- Profession: Planter

Thomas Jones was the fifth intendent (mayor) of Charleston, South Carolina, serving one term from 1789 to 1790.

Jones was born on December 13, 1742. He served in the South Carolina State House, representing St. Philip's and St. Michael's Parish (i.e., the Charleston area) during five General Assemblies from 1782 to 1790. He was elected intendant in September 1789. He died October 30, 1836, and is buried in the Circular Congregational churchyard in Charleston.

Preceded by Rawlins Lowndes	Mayor of Charleston, South Carolina; 1789–1790	Succeeded by Arnoldus Vanderhorst
