= Steven Thomas =

Steven Thomas may refer to:

- Steven Thomas (sailor), Australian sailor
- Steven Thomas (entrepreneur) (1971–2008), American entrepreneur
- Steven Thomas (HIV), American convicted in Finland of infecting women with HIV
- Steven Thomas (basketball) (born 1981), American basketball player
- Steven Thomas (racing driver) (born 1967), American racing driver

== See also ==
- Steve Thomas (disambiguation)
- Stephen Thomas (disambiguation)
