= John Faucheraud Grimké =

American judge (1752–1819)

John F. Grimké
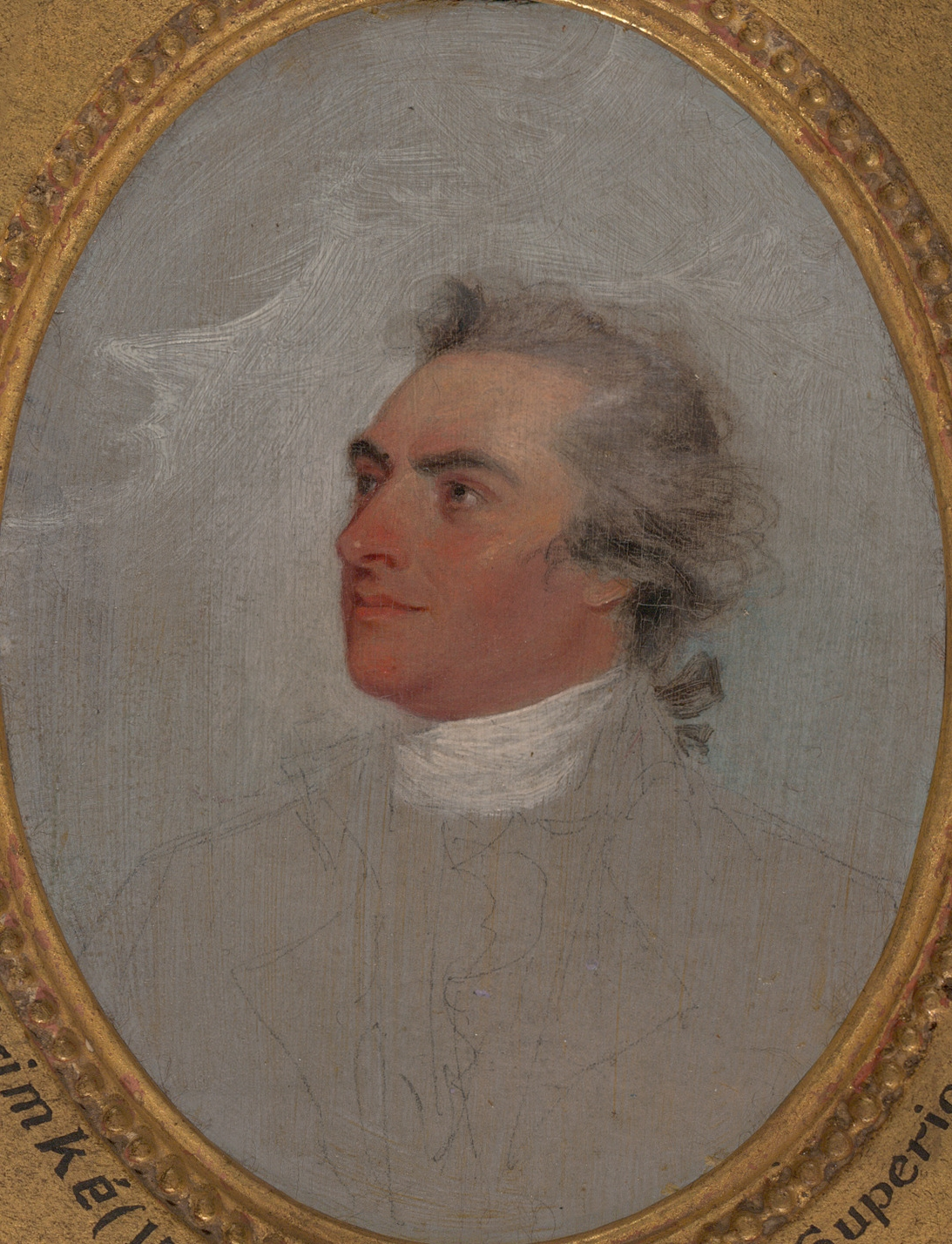

Associate justice, South Carolina's Court of Common Pleas and General Sessions
- In office 1783–1819

Intendant (mayor) of Charleston, South Carolina
- In office 1786–1788

South Carolina state legislature
- In office 1782–1790

Personal details
- Born: December 16, 1752
- Died: August 9, 1819 (aged 66) Long Branch, New Jersey
- Party: Federalist
- Spouse: Mary Smith
- Children: Thomas Smith Grimké, Sarah Moore Grimké, Angelina Grimké Weld, Henry, Frederick
- Education: Trinity College, Cambridge; Princeton University
- Occupation: judge

John Faucheraud Grimké (December 16, 1752 – August 9, 1819) was an American jurist who served as associate justice and senior associate justice of South Carolina's Court of Common Pleas and General Sessions from 1783 until his death. He also served in the South Carolina state legislature from 1782 until 1790. He was intendant (mayor) of Charleston, South Carolina, for two terms, from 1786 to 1788.

== Life, education and war service ==
Grimké's maternal grandparents were Huguenots who left France in the 17th century after the Edict of Fontainebleau stripped Protestants of their rights and emigrated to South Carolina (other Huguenots went to New England, New York, and Virginia, and to various tolerant European states, including Great Britain, the Netherlands, Prussia, and Russia). Grimké's paternal grandparents were German merchants from Alsace-Lorraine, who came to South Carolina in the 17th century. Their name was originally "Grimk" until changed by Grimké's grandfather, John Paul Grimké. He was a silversmith whose work was said to rival that of Paul Revere.

Grimké was tutored as a boy and studied as an undergraduate Princeton University. He then sailed to England to study law at Trinity College, Cambridge, and at the Middle Temple of the Inns of Court. After returning to the colonies, Grimké became increasingly caught up in the movement for independence. Though a young man, he (with Benjamin Franklin and others) signed a 1774 petition to King George III and the British government protesting the Boston Port Act.

After the 1775 outbreak of the American Revolution, Grimké returned to South Carolina and joined the Continental Army; he was commissioned as a captain in Charleston's Regiment of Artillery. He was promoted to major in 1778, and later that year became deputy adjutant general, holding the rank of colonel. He was taken prisoner by the British at the siege of Charleston in 1780, but released in a prisoner exchange and paroled. Arrested the next year on a flimsy pretext, he was imprisoned by the British for five weeks, which he considered to have nullified his parole.

Grimké then joined the army of Nathanael Greene, serving until the end of the war. He served as an officer under Colonel Samuel Elbert, under the extended Georgia command of Major General Robert Howe. He fought in several famous battles, such as Eutaw Springs and Yorktown which ended the war.

== Political career ==
Grimké was elected a judge of the superior court in 1783 under the new government of the state and United States. In 1799 he became senior associate. He was elected as a representative to the state house, and then as speaker of the South Carolina House of Representatives in 1785-86. He served as a member of the state convention of 1788 that reviewed and adopted the Federal constitution.

In 1811, political enemies in the South Carolina legislature attempted to remove Judge Grimké from his position by impeachment. He was easily acquitted of the charges but his health suffered from the experience.

Grimké was described by John Belton O'Neall as a "stern, unbending judge" who tolerated nothing. Grimké held a high opinion of the abilities of women; he believed his daughter Sarah Grimké would have made a good lawyer, had she been born a man and allowed to practice. He also believed that women should be allowed to serve as executrices of decedents' estates.

=== Publications ===
In 1785, Grimké served as a member of a three-man commission designated to revise, digest, and publish the state laws. Though the commission's final report was not adopted by the state, some recommendations were incorporated into law. Grimké’s research resulted in the publication of Public Laws of the State of South Carolina (Philadelphia, 1790). It served for several decades as a standard legal reference. The book contains information on the English statutes which extended to or were generally received in the North American colonies, and includes references to English cases and decisions on those statutes.

He also published the following texts:

- Revised Edition of the Laws of South Carolina to 1789,
- Law of Executors for South Carolina,
- Duty of Justices of the Peace (2nd ed., 1796), and,
- Duties of Executors and Administrators of Estates (anonymously) (New York, 1797) This was in the period when he was breaking his father's will in the Charleston Equity Courts.

== Family ==
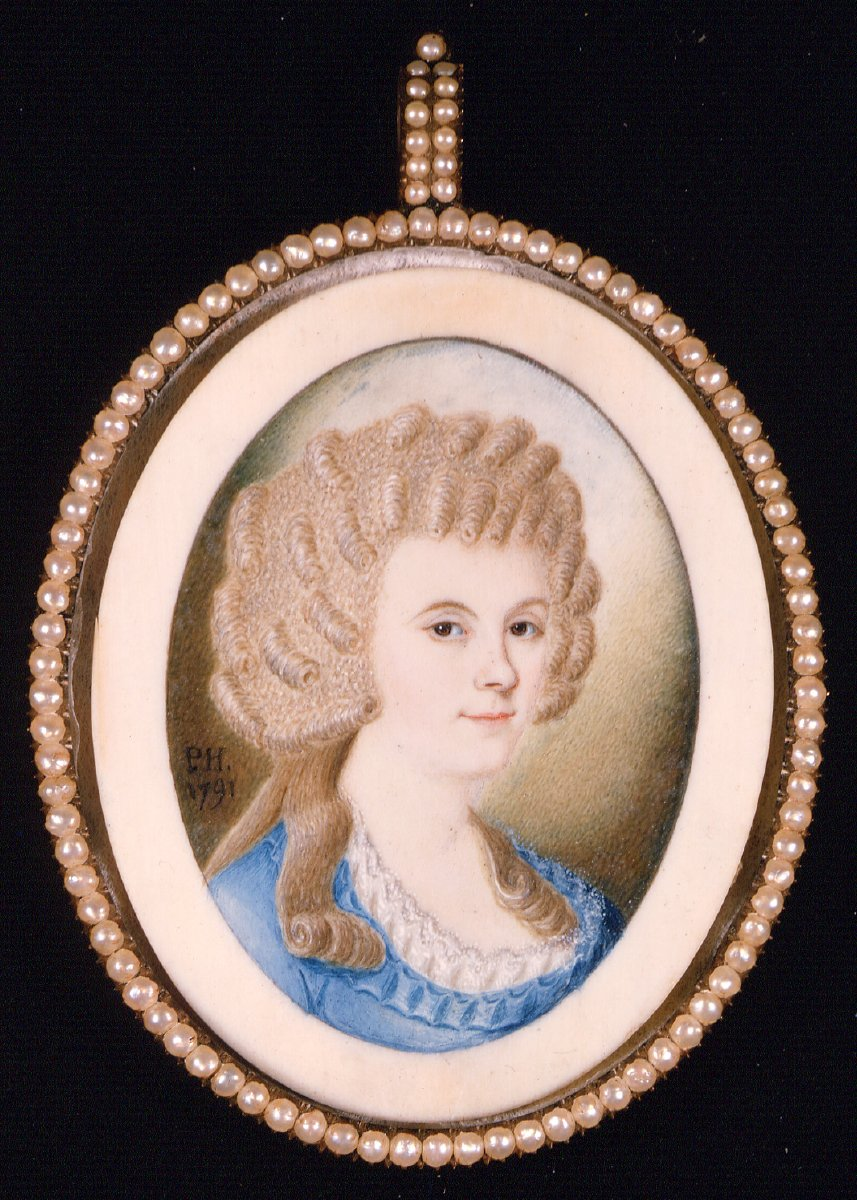
Mary Moore Smith

John Faucheraud Grimké was a member of Charleston’s upper class and was well-known in society. His uncle Frederick Grimké (1705–1778) was the father of Elizabeth Grimké (1742–1792), the wife of John Rutledge. In 1784, he married Mary Smith, known as "Polly", a descendant of Thomas Smith, whose extended Charleston family was wealthy and influential. The couple maintained a large slave population at Belmont, their rice plantation, and their other up-countries properties, as well as in their house in Charleston at 321 East Bay Street. Mary Grimké was particularly strict with the slaves, often to the distress of her daughters, Sarah and Angelina. Grimké may have had questions concerning slavery, but he never publicly stood against the system under which he became a rich man, nor did he take any action to oppose it.

John and Mary Grimké had fourteen children, three of whom died in infancy. Their children included Sarah Moore Grimké and Angelina Grimké Weld, who found living in a slave-owning family intolerable, moved to Philadelphia, and became influential abolitionists and speakers, drawing on their first-hand knowledge of slavery's horrors. Other children were attorney and reformer Thomas Smith Grimké and Henry W. Grimké. Another son, Frederick (born 1 September 1791; died 8 March 1863), a graduate of Yale, moved to Chillicothe, Ohio. He became a judge and state supreme court justice.

As a widower, their son Henry W. Grimké lived in a common-law relationship with Nancy Weston, an enslaved woman of color. They had three mixed-race sons whom he recognized fully (but did not free, due to the South Carolina law of 1841 forbidding the freeing of slaves, nor introduce to his family): Archibald Grimké, who became a journalist and diplomat; Francis J. Grimké, a Presbyterian minister; and John Grimké, born just a few months after Henry's death in 1852. In 1868, Henry's sisters Sarah and Angelina learned about his to-them unknown sons, then in college at Lincoln University outside Philadelphia. They helped the boys through college and opened their homes to them.

== Death ==
After the attempted impeachment, Grimké's health deteriorated. When the leading doctors in Charleston could find no cure, they advised the judge to go to Philadelphia to consult an expert physician. He took his daughter Sarah with him as nursemaid and companion. The doctor could not determine the cause or nature of Grimké's affliction, and suggested that sea air might help. Grimké and his daughter moved to a boardinghouse on the Atlantic shore at Long Branch, New Jersey. A short time later, he died of his unknown wasting disease. His body was buried at Long Branch.

Political offices
Preceded by Arnoldus Vanderhorst	Mayor of Charleston, South Carolina; 1786–1788	Succeeded by Rawlins Lowndes
