= Bass Pond Site =

Archaeological site in South Carolina, United States

- U.S. National Register of Historic Places
- Nearest city: Kiawah Island, South Carolina
- Area: 0.8 acres (0.32 ha)
- NRHP reference No.: 79002379
- Added to NRHP: April 24, 1979

Bass Pond Site (38CH124) is a historic archaeological site located at Kiawah Island, Charleston County, South Carolina. Excavations indicate that at least two separate human occupations are represented: a Formative period settlement (ca. 3,800 B.P.) and a Middle Woodland settlement (ca. 2,800 B.P.). Both of the occupations occur in the shell midden. It was listed on the National Register of Historic Places in 1979.
