= Freshfields Village =

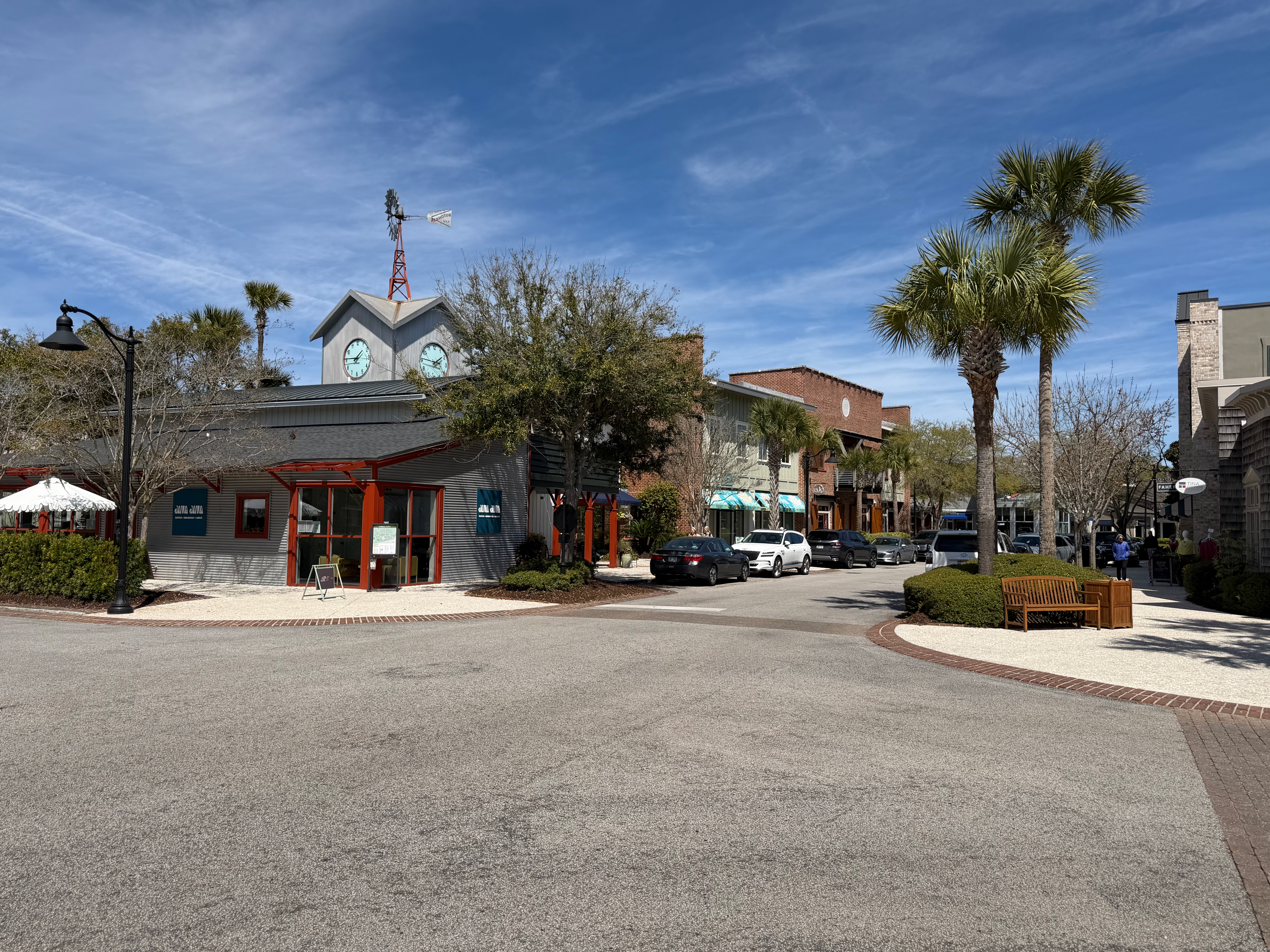
- Intersection of Freshfields Drive and Gardeners Circle
- Location: Kiawah Island, South Carolina, U.S.
- Coordinates: 32.60715°N 80.14805°W
- Address: 165 Village Green Lane
- Opened: 2004 (22 years ago)
- Owner: Edens
- Website: freshfieldsvillage.com

Freshfields Village is an open-air shopping destination on Kiawah Island, South Carolina, United States. Located on the southern side of Kiawah Island Parkway, it was established in 2004 and contains around 50 businesses. In 2022, the facility was sold to EDENS, a real-estate firm from Columbia, South Carolina, for $125 million.

A boutique hotel, the Andell Inn, is located on site, as is a 38,000 sq.ft Harris Teeter grocery store.
