= Arnoldus Vander Horst House =

Historic house in South Carolina, United States

- U.S. National Register of Historic Places
- Location within South Carolina Location within the United States
- Location: 99 Governors Drive, Kiawah Island, South Carolina
- Coordinates: 32°37′0″N 80°4′23″W
- Built: 1802
- NRHP reference No.: 73001697
- Added to NRHP: Oct. 25, 1973

The Arnoldus Vander Horst House is a plantation house on Kiawah Island, South Carolina. It is named for Arnoldus Vanderhorst, who was a governor of South Carolina.

The house was listed in the National Register of Historic Places on October 25, 1973.

== See also ==
- Vanderhorst Row
- Elias Vanderhorst House
- National Register of Historic Places listings in Charleston County, South Carolina
