= Steve Thomas =

Steve Thomas may refer to:

- Steve Thomas (artist) (born 1944), English designer and visual artist
- Steve Thomas (television) (born 1952), former host of This Old House on PBS, host of Renovation Nation on Planet Green, sailor, and residential builder
- Steve Thomas (ice hockey) (born 1963), National Hockey League ice hockey player
- Steve Thomas (politician) (born 1967), Western Australian MLA
- Steve Thomas (footballer) (born 1979), Welsh footballer
- Steve Thomas (rugby) (born 1979), Welsh rugby league footballer
- Steve Thomas (basketball) (born 1981), American basketball player

== Stevie Thomas ==
- Stevie Thomas (born 1967), Arena football player

== See also ==
- Steven Thomas (disambiguation)
- Stephen Thomas (disambiguation)
