= Kiawah Island, South Carolina =

Island in South Carolina, United States

- Town
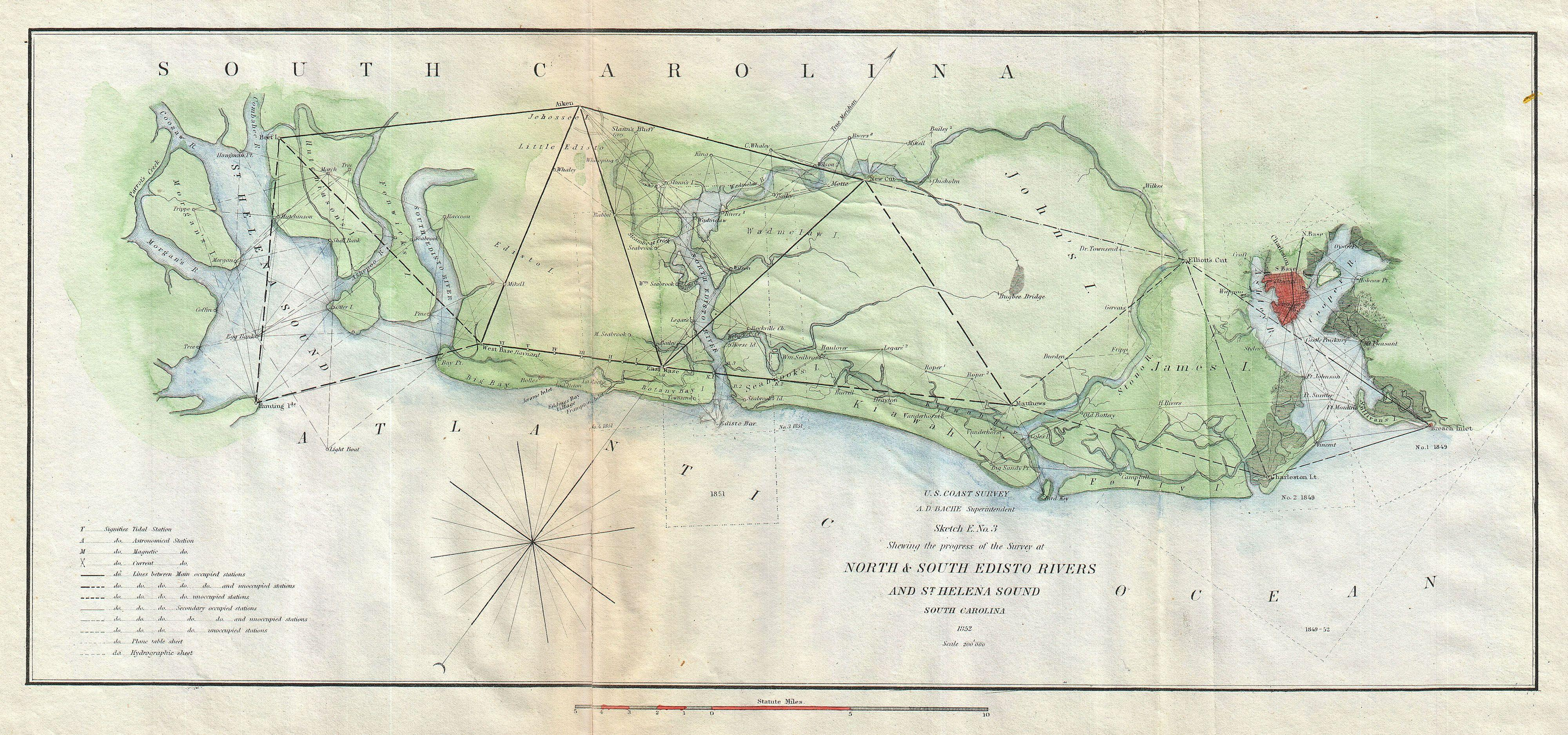
- Kiawah Island is just right of center on this 1852 U.S. Coast Survey map

- Flag Seal

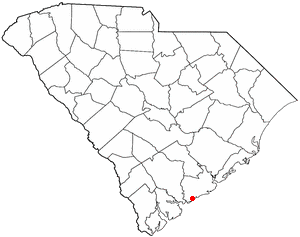
- Location of Kiawah Island in South Carolina
- Coordinates: 32°36′51″N 80°03′47″W
- Country: United States
- State: South Carolina
- County: Charleston
- Incorporated as a town: 1938
- Incorporated as a city: 1957

Area
  - Total: 15.14 sq mi (39.21 km^{2})
  - Land: 11.17 sq mi (28.93 km^{2})
  - Water: 3.97 sq mi (10.28 km^{2})
- Elevation: 7 ft (2.1 m)

Population (2020)
  - Total: 2,013
  - Density: 180.2/sq mi (69.58/km^{2})
- Time zone: UTC−5 (EST)
  - Summer (DST): UTC−4 (EDT)
- ZIP Code: 29455
- Area code: 843, 854
- FIPS code: 45-38162
- GNIS feature ID: 2405943
- Website: www.kiawahisland.gov

Kiawah (/ˈkiəwə/ KEY-ə-wə) is a sea island, or barrier island, on the Atlantic coast of the United States. Located 25 miles (40 km) southwest of Charleston in Charleston County, South Carolina, it is a seasonal beach and golf community. It is home to the Kiawah Island Golf Resort, with vacation houses and condos, beaches, golf courses, and other resort-like amenities. As of the 2020 census, Kiawah Island's full-time population was 2,013, up from 1,163 at the 2000 census. During the busy season, the population increases to over 10,000. The island is part of the Charleston-North Charleston, South Carolina Metropolitan Statistical Area. Alternative spellings and variants of the name itself include "Kiawa", "Kittiwar" (in DuBose Heyward's novel Porgy), and "Kittiwah" (in George Gershwin's opera Porgy and Bess). The island has a per capita income of $210,726, the highest in South Carolina.

== History ==
The Bass Pond Site and Arnoldus Vander Horst House are listed on the National Register of Historic Places.

Kiawah was named for the Kiawah people, who were led by their head chieftain or cacique. In 1670, the Kiawah cacique led English colonists to settle at Charlestowne Landing.

In 1699, former pirate Captain George Raynor gained possession of Kiawah Island. On November 1, 1701, Raynor sold half of the island to Captain William Davis and left the other half in his will for his granddaughter. The half left to his will was passed through family members until John Stanyarne acquired the property. Stanyarne subsequently purchased the remaining half of the island from the family of Captain Davis.

The island was primarily used for cattle farming prior to the Civil War. Stanyarne built an estate that was valued highly, falling into a category of value that only 19% of the properties of South Carolina qualified for. In his will he left the southwestern portion of the island to his granddaughter Mary Gibbs, and the northeastern portion to his granddaughter Elizabeth Vanderhorst. Both portions were to be passed down until the third generation, when they would become considered fee simple ownerships. Gibbs died at a young age; it is assumed that her father, Robert Gibbs, maintained her portion of the island.

During the Revolutionary War the island has very few records of events, other than its use as a safe recovery space for American soldiers and their families. The Vanderhorst property was burned down during the time of the Revolutionary War, but was rebuilt shortly after, and finished in the beginning of the 19th century. The Vanderhorst family infrequently inhabited the island, and often stayed in their homes elsewhere along the Carolina coast. The Vanderhorst family still only claimed ownership of half of the island, with the other half being passed through the wills of the Gibbs family. A portion of the island controlled by the Gibbs family was sold to William Seabrook. The other portion was sold to Isaac Wilson. The island during this time only remained inhabited by slaves and the properties built by the families.

The Civil War impacted Kiawah Island as it did the entire South. There were not damages recorded. The Vanderhorst family was not presently residing there, but they did check the state of the property in the earlier years of the war. There are not records of what occurred on Kiawah during the war in terms of battles, but it was sieged by the North with Charleston and taken over by Northern troops. They remained stationed there as a precautionary measure. The properties seemed to have obtained damage, but it is unclear how or how extensive.

The Vanderhorst family did not have many records from this time period. At the end of the war, they were in financial trouble and were unsure how to maintain ownership of Kiawah. They were able to keep their portion of the island, while the other two portions changed ownership. The Vanderhorsts hired freed slaves for labor and were able to produce cotton on the island. By 1870, Arnoldus Vanderhorst, the caretaker and owner of the Vanderhorst portion of Kiawah, recorded that the island was restored and there was agricultural growth.

== Development ==
Long held by the Vanderhorst family, Kiawah Island was purchased by C.C. Royal in 1950 for logging and timber; he went on to develop the first summer home neighborhood in 1954 along the beach and named the street Eugenia, after his wife.

In 1974 Royal's heirs sold the island to Kuwait Investment Corporation; soon after, a thorough environmental survey was conducted, and a master plan for Kiawah's development was produced with help from the Sea Pines Company. Two years later, in 1976, real estate sales commenced and the Cougar Point (formerly Marsh Point) golf course was opened.

The 1980s saw the opening of two of the seven golf courses associated with Kiawah-Turtle Point in 1981 and Osprey Point in 1988. That year also saw all resort assets and amenities, along with Kiawah's undeveloped lands, purchased by the development group Kiawah Resort Associates (KRA), owned by Charles P. Darby III and Patrick W. McKinney, et al. The Town of Kiawah was also established in the same year.

Following the impact of Hurricane Hugo in 1989, KRA sold resort assets to Landmark Land Co., which then sold the assets to William H. Goodwin in 1993. The 1990s saw the establishment of the Kiawah Island Club in 1993 and the addition of three more courses: the Ocean Course in 1991, the River Course in 1995, and Oak Point in 1997. The last of Kiawah's associated golf courses, Cassique, was opened in 2000. Freshfields Village, a town-center-type mix of shopping, dining, and services saw ground broken in 2004. That same year, The Sanctuary hotel opened on the island.

In 2013, Darby and associates sold Kiawah Partners to the South Street Partners for an estimated $350 million. This transaction included Kiawah Island Club, Kiawah Island Real Estate, Freshfields Village, Kiawah Island Utility, and other domestic and international holdings.

The island is a private gated community; visitors must obtain a pass from the security gate on Kiawah Island Parkway, at its intersection with Beachwalker Drive.

== Geography ==
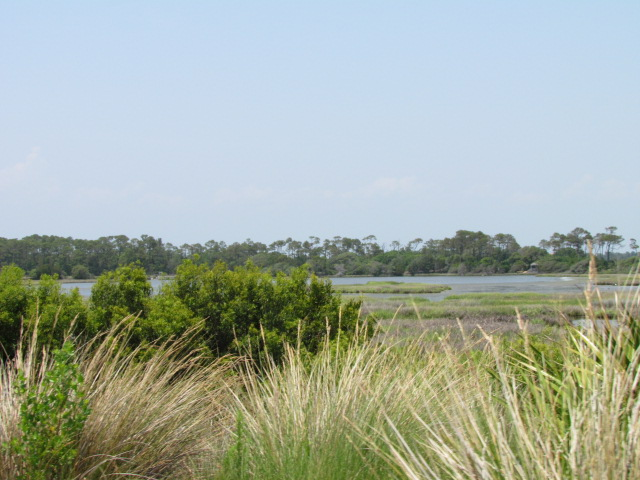
The marshes at Kiawah Island

According to the United States Census Bureau, the town has a total area of 13.4 square miles (34.8 km^{2}), of which 11.0 square miles (28.4 km^{2}) is land and 2.5 square miles (6.4 km^{2}), or 18.36%, is water.

== Demographics ==
Historical population
| Census | Pop. | Note | %± |
|---|---|---|---|
| 1880 | 91 | | — |
| 1990 | 718 | | — |
| 2000 | 1,163 | | 62.0% |
| 2010 | 1,626 | | 39.8% |
| 2020 | 2,013 | | 23.8% |
U.S. Decennial Census

=== 2020 census ===
Kiawah Island racial composition
| Race | Num. | Perc. |
|---|---|---|
| White (non-Hispanic) | 1,915 | 95.13% |
| Black or African American (non-Hispanic) | 20 | 0.99% |
| Asian | 22 | 1.09% |
| Other/Mixed | 25 | 1.24% |
| Hispanic or Latino | 31 | 1.54% |

As of the 2020 United States census, there were 2,013 people, 869 households, and 675 families residing in the town.

=== 2000 census ===
As of the census of 2000, there were 1,163 people, 557 households, and 474 families residing in the town. The population density was 104.2 inhabitants per square mile (40.2/km^{2}). There were 3,070 housing units at an average density of 275.0 per square mile (106.2/km^{2}). The racial makeup of the town was 98.19% White, 0.34% African American, 0.17% Native American, 0.17% Asian, and 1.12% from two or more races. Hispanic or Latino of any race were 0.17% of the population.

There were 557 households, out of which 6.1% had children under the age of 18 living with them, 82.9% were married couples living together, 1.1% had a female householder with no husband present, and 14.9% were non-families. Of all households 13.1% were made up of individuals, and 7.4% had someone living alone who was 65 years of age or older. The average household size was 2.09 and the average family size was 2.25.

In the town, the age distribution of the population shows 6.0% under the age of 18, 1.5% from 18 to 24, 6.4% from 25 to 44, 48.8% from 45 to 64, and 37.3% who were 65 years of age or older. The median age was 61 years. For every 100 females, there were 98.5 males. For every 100 females age 18 and over, there were 98.7 males.

The median income for a household in the town was $76,114, and the median income for a family was $83,829. Males had a median income of $60,938 versus $32,500 for females. The per capita income for the town was $47,782. About 4.4% of families and 6.4% of the population were below the poverty line, including 2.9% of those under age 18 and 3.6% of those age 65 or over.

== Parks and recreation ==
=== Golf ===
Kiawah Island is widely hailed as one of the premier golf destinations on the East Coast. The island features seven award-winning golf courses designed by the likes of Jack Nicklaus, Gary Player, Tom Fazio, and Pete Dye. The courses snake along the narrow island, moving from the dense wooded interior of the island to the breezy oceanfront. Five of the courses are owned and maintained by Kiawah Island Golf Resort. These include the Ocean Course, Turtle Point, Osprey Point, Oak Point, and Cougar Point. Two courses, the River Course and Cassique, are owned and maintained by Kiawah Island Club.

==== The Ocean Course ====
Pete Dye designed the Ocean Course in 1991 and the course has since proved to be one of the toughest on the East Coast. The Ocean Course was the home of the 1991 Ryder Cup, the 1997 World Cup of Golf, the 2007 Senior PGA Championship, the 2012 PGA Championship and the 2021 PGA Championship, becoming only the fourth golf course in history to host each of the PGA of America's men's major championships. The Ocean Course was featured in the 2000 movie The Legend of Bagger Vance.

=== County parks ===
The Charleston County Park and Recreation Commission (CCPRC) operates a park on the island, Beachwalker County Park, located on the west end of the island. In 2013, Forbes ranked the park's beach as the 10th best in the United States.

=== Walking and biking ===
Thirty miles of paved trails and 10 miles of beach provide a natural setting for biking and walking.

== Government ==
The city is run by an elected mayor–council government system. The mayor until November 2029 is Brad Belt.

The Kiawah Island Community Association (KICA) is a non-profit corporation established in 1976 that governs and manages the business and property that contribute to the overall ambiance and property values of Kiawah Island, South Carolina. The association maintains and insures the roads, ponds, facilities, parks and open areas built or conveyed by the developer, and offers social and recreational programs for property owners.

== Education ==
There is one school district in the county, Charleston County School District.

It is zoned to Mount Zion Elementary School, Haut Gap Middle School, and St. John's High School.

== Notable people ==
The following people own homes on Kiawah Island:

- Ray Allen, NBA basketball player
- Ty Cobb, former White House lawyer in Trump administration
- Joe Gibbs, retired Hall of Fame NFL head coach for the Washington Redskins
- Nikki Haley, former Governor of South Carolina and United States Ambassador to the United Nations
- Jeffrey Immelt, Chairman of the Board and Chief Executive Officer of General Electric
- Tara Lipinski, Olympic gold-medalist figure skater
- Dan Marino, retired NFL quarterback
- George Will, syndicated columnist
