= Arnoldus Vanderhorst =

American politician

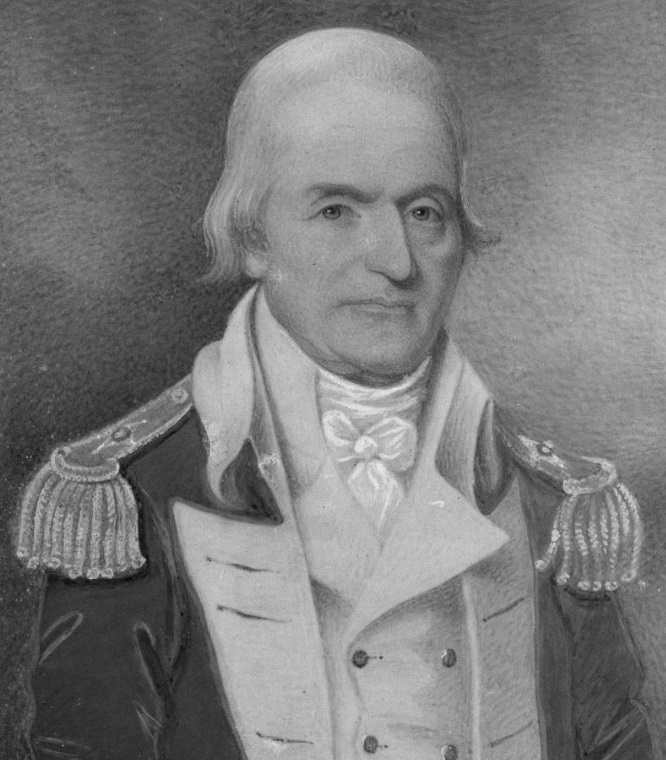
- 1856 portrait by Henry Breintnall Bounetheau

38th Governor of South Carolina
- In office December 17, 1794 – December 8, 1796
- Lieutenant: Lewis Morris
- Preceded by: William Moultrie
- Succeeded by: Charles Pinckney

Mayor of Charleston, South Carolina
- In office 1790 – 1792
- Preceded by: Thomas Jones
- Succeeded by: John Huger
- In office 1785 – 1786
- Preceded by: Richard Hutson
- Succeeded by: John Faucheraud Grimke

Member of the South Carolina Senate from Christ Church Parish
- In office August 31, 1779 – January 1, 1787

Member of the South Carolina General Assembly from St. Phillip's and St. Michael's Parish
- In office March 25, 1776 – October 17, 1778

Personal details
- Born: March 21, 1748 Christ Church Parish, Mount Pleasant, Province of South Carolina
- Died: January 29, 1815 (aged 66) Kiawah Island, South Carolina
- Resting place: St. Michael's Churchyard, Charleston, South Carolina
- Profession: planter

Arnoldus Vanderhorst (/vænˈdrɑːs/; March 21, 1748 – January 29, 1815) was an American military officer and planter. He was a general of the South Carolina militia during the American Revolutionary War and served as the 38th governor of South Carolina from 1794 to 1796.

== Early life and career ==
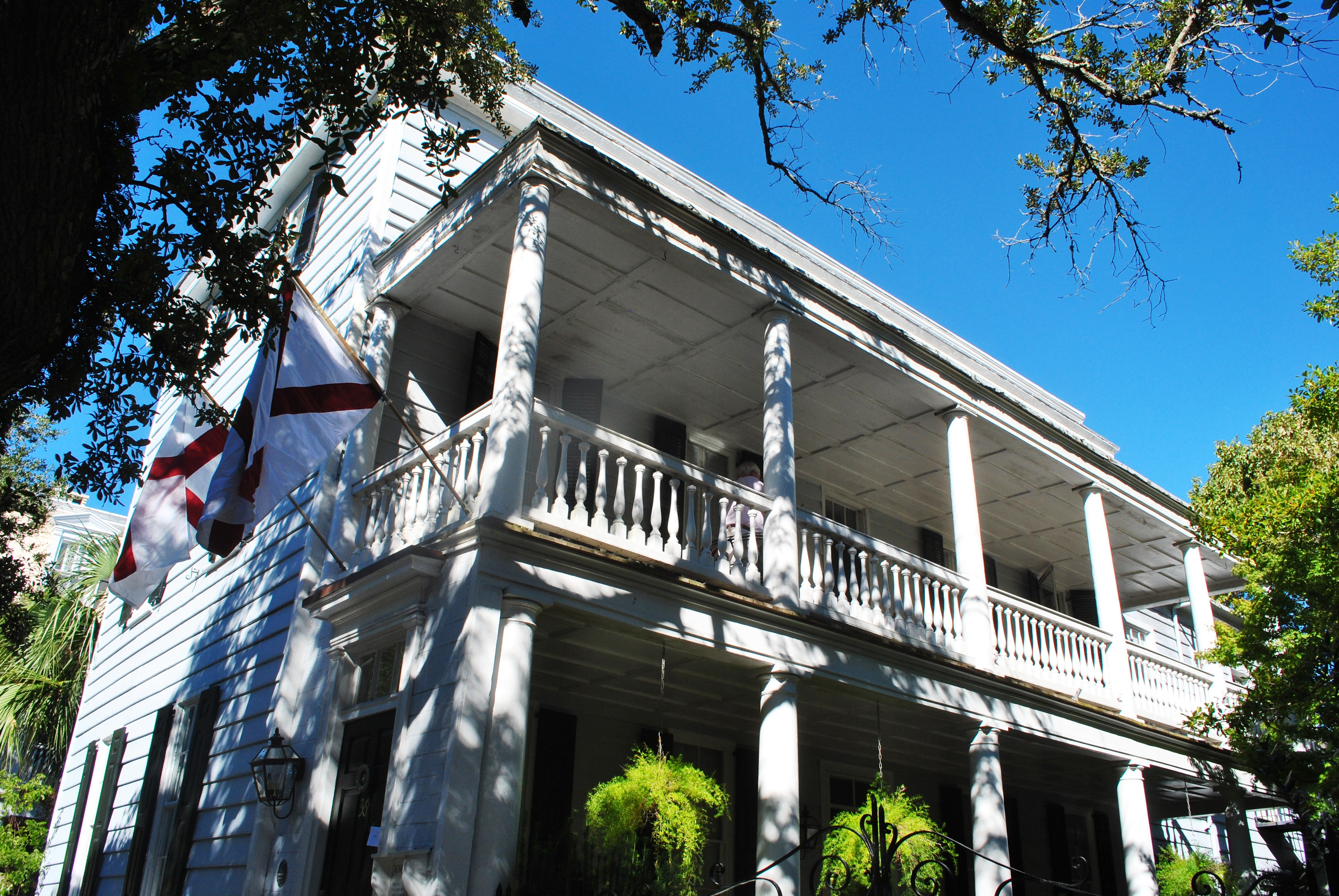
36 Meeting Street, Charleston, ca. 1740 is associated with many eminent South Carolina family names: DeSaussure, Vanderhorst, Brunch, Rivers, Kershaw and Pelzer

Born in Christ Church Parish, Vanderhorst took up planting at his plantation on the eastern half of Kiawah Island in the Lowcountry. He participated in the Revolutionary War as an officer under the command of Francis Marion. During the war, he also served in the South Carolina House of Representatives from 1776 to 1780 and in the South Carolina Senate from 1780 to 1786. After his service in the state Senate, Vanderhorst was elected mayor of Charleston for two terms. He was elected mayor of Charleston, South Carolina, on September 12, 1785.

== Governorship ==
In 1794, he was elected by the General Assembly as a Federalist to be Governor of South Carolina. During his administration, Vanderhorst pressed the legislature for the revision of the criminal code because the sentences were so harsh that jurors would grant acquittal. In addition, he advocated for a prison system similar to that of the state of Pennsylvania instead of the state jails that "were of medieval barbarity."

He also proposed the need for a state penitentiary. Later the state penitentiary named Central Correction Institution that was open until 1994.

== Later life ==
After leaving the governorship in 1796, he returned to his plantation on Kiawah Island where slaves he owned cultivated sea island cotton. Vanderhorst died on January 29, 1815, and he was buried at the St. Michael's churchyard in Charleston.

== Archives ==
Papers of the Vanderhorst family are held at the South Carolina Historical Society and Bristol Archives.

== See also ==
- Arnoldus Vander Horst House
- Vanderhorst Row

Political offices
Preceded by Richard Hutson	Mayor of Charleston, South Carolina; 1785–1786	Succeeded by John Faucheraud Grimké
Preceded by Thomas Jones	Mayor of Charleston, South Carolina; 1790–1792	Succeeded by John Huger
Preceded by William Moultrie	Governor of South Carolina; 1794–1796	Succeeded by Charles Pinckney
