= Paint This with Jerry Yarnell =

- Starring: Jerry Yarnell
- Country of origin: United States
- Original language: English

Production
- Production companies: Yarnell Studio & School of Fine Art

Original release
- Release: 1999

Paint This with Jerry Yarnell is an educational television show produced by Jerry Yarnell, owner of the Yarnell School of Fine Art. It is broadcast primarily on public television channels. The show focuses mostly on landscape, wildlife, and Western American themes, in the impressionist style. The media used are: acrylics, water miscible oils and watercolors.

== Format ==
Most of the episodes are in groups which cover instructions and demonstrations for a single example painting. All episodes are 30 minutes in length.

Paint This episodes
Title
"Adobe Sunrise"
Four episodes. Acrylic on 18" x 24" stretched canvas.
"African Catnap (Lions)"
Five episodes. Acrylic on 18" x 24" gallery wrap canvas.
"America's Pride (Bald Eagle) and Broken Pots 2"
Five episodes. Two 5" x 8" acrylic miniature paintings.
"Appaloosa Beauty"
Four episodes. Acrylic on 16" x 20" Gallery Wrap canvas.
"Apple"
From Youth Lessons.
"Autumn Bridge"
Bridge over a country stream. Four episodes. Acrylic on 18" x 24" stretched canvas.
"Autumn's Delight"
Five episodes. Acrylic on 18" x 24" stretched canvas.
"Back Country Boulders"
Three episodes. Acrylic on 16" x 20" stretched canvas.
"Backwater Swamp"
Four episodes. Acrylic on 18" x 24" stretched canvas.
"Basket of Plenty"
Five episodes. Acrylic on 12" x 24" stretched canvas.
"Beside Still Waters"
18" × 24" acrylic on stretched canvas.
"Beyond the Wall"
18" × 24" acrylic on stretched canvas.
"Big Ears (Young Kudu Buck)"
Four episodes. Acrylic on 16" x 20" Gallery Wrap canvas.
"Biloxi Shrimpers"
Four episodes. Acrylic on 12" x 24" Gallery Wrap canvas.
"Bison Valley"
Four episodes. Acrylic on 15" × 30" Stretched Canvas.
"Bluebird's Paradise (Diptych)"
Five episodes. Acrylic on two 12" x 16" stretched canvases.
"Chesapeake Bay Visitors"
Wild geese in Chesapeake Bay. Four episodes. Acrylic on 15" x 30" stretched canvas.
"Church in the Wildwood"
Four episodes. Acrylic on 16" x 20" stretched canvas.
"A Colorful Gateway"
Four episodes. Acrylic on 16" x 20" stretched canvas.
"Cowboy Campfire"
Five episodes. Acrylic on 18" x 24" stretched canvas.
"A Cunning Predator (Coyote in Weeds)"
Four episodes. Acrylic on 18" x 24" stretched canvas.
"The Decision"
Three episodes. Acrylic on 15" x 30" stretched canvas.
"Desert Miracle"
Four episodes. Acrylic on 16" x 20 Gallery Wrap canvas.
"European Flower Box"
Two episodes. Acrylic on 16" x 20" stretched canvas.
"Evening Glow"
Three episodes; Acrylic on 16" x 20" stretched canvas.
"The Falls"
Three episodes. Acrylic on 16" x 20" stretched canvas.
"A Farmer's Icon (Barn)"
Four episodes. Acrylic on 18" x 24" stretched canvas.
"Field of Flowers"
From Youth Lessons.
"First Love"
Three episodes; Acrylic on 16" x 20" stretched canvas.
"Foggy Departure (Train)"
Three episodes; Acrylic on 16" x 20" stretched canvas.
"A Frosty Tradition"
A house, mailbox and snowman in a rural setting. Five episodes. Acrylic on 15" x 30" stretched canvas.
"Gray Wolf Ridge"
Five episodes. Acrylic on 18" × 24" stretched canvas.
"The Guardian (A Swainson Hawk)"
Five episodes. Acrylic on 18" x 24" stretched canvas.
"Hawaii's Finest Hour"
Five episodes. Acrylic on 18" x 24" stretched canvas.
"Heaven On Earth"
Five episodes. Acrylic on 18" x 24" stretched canvas.
"Hide and Seek"
18" × 24" acrylic on stretched canvas.
"High and Mighty"
Mountains rising above a forest. Four episodes. Acrylic on 18" x 24" stretched canvas.
"The Homestead"
Four episodes. Acrylic on 8" x 10" (miniature) stretched canvas.
"How to Begin"
From Youth Lessons.
"In the Shadow of Giants (Elephants)"
Four episodes. Acrylic on 12" x 24" Gallery Wrap canvas.
"Jerry's Lily Pond"
Two episodes. Acrylic on 16" x 20" stretched canvas.
"Kim"
Three episodes. Acrylic on 16" x 20" stretched canvas.
"King of His Domain (Grizzly Bear)"
Four episodes. Acrylic on 18" x 24" stretched canvas.
"The Lighthouse"
Two episodes. Acrylic on 18" x 24" stretched canvas.
"Long-Legged Fisherman"
Four episodes. 12" × 24" acrylic on stretched canvas.
"Mama's Baby"
Two episodes. Acrylic on 16" x 20" stretched canvas.
"Mama's Pride"
Two episodes. Acrylic on 12" x 16" Gallery Wrap canvas.
"Morning Fog"
Three episodes. Acrylic on 16" x 20" stretched canvas.
"Multnomah the Magnificent"
View looking upstream toward Multnomah Falls. Five episodes. Acrylic on 18" x 24" stretched canvas.
"My Favorite Things"
Four episodes. Acrylic on 12" x 16" x 1.5" Gallery Wrap canvas.
"My Girl"
Four episodes. Acrylic on 18" x 24" stretched canvas.
"Nature’s Fury, Unleashed"
Four episodes. 15" × 30" acrylic on stretched canvas.
"Night Sail"
Five episodes. Acrylic on 16" x 20" stretched canvas.
"Northern Lights Spectacle"
Aurora Borealis. Four episodes. Acrylic on 18" x 24" stretched canvas.
"Old Faithful"
18" × 24" acrylic on stretched canvas.
"Osage Prairie Summer"
Five episodes. Acrylic on 18" x 24" stretched canvas.
"Parade of Lights"
Four episodes. Acrylic on 15" x 30" stretched canvas.
"A Perfect Pair (Cardinals)"
Four episodes. Acrylic on 16" x 20" stretched canvas.
"Perfect Perch"
Four episodes. Acrylic on 18" x 24" stretched canvas.
"Pheasant in the Rough"
Five episodes. Acrylic on 18" x 24" stretched canvas.
"Prairie Magic"
Four episodes. Water-Miscible Oil on 12" x 24" stretched canvas.
"Rabbit"
From Youth Lessons.
"Reminders of the Past (Study)"
Two episodes. Acrylic on 16" x 20" stretched canvas.
"A Restful Harbor"
Picture of A Restful Harbor. Five episodes. Acrylic on 12" x 24" stretched canvas.
"Resting Wren"
Two episodes. Acrylic on 16" x 20" canvas.
"Rocky Mountain High No. 2"
Five episodes. Acrylic on 20" x 24" stretched canvas.
"Rocky Mountain Refuge"
Four episodes. Illustrates the "Multi-Media" Technique only. Does not include instructions for creating the painting. Technique is performed on a previously created 22" x 28" acrylic painting.
"Rocky River"
Three episodes. Acrylic on 16" x 20" stretched canvas.
"The Roost"
Four episodes. Acrylic on 16" x 20" stretched canvas.
"The Rose"
Two episodes. Acrylic on 12" x 16" smooth texture canvas.
"Ruby"
Three episodes. Acrylic on 8" x 10" stretched canvas.
"Southwest Serenade"
Two episodes. Acrylic on 16" x 20" canvas.
"Standing Proud"
Four episodes. Acrylic on 12" x 24" stretched Gallery Wrap canvas.
"Starry, Starry Night"
Three episodes. Acrylic on 18" x 24" stretched canvas.
"Step By Beautiful Step"
Three episodes. Acrylic on 16" x 20" canvas.
"Steps to Nowhere"
Five episodes. Acrylic on 16" x 20" stretched canvas.
"Stormy Skies (from study series)"
Two episodes. Acrylic.
"Structuring Your Painting"
Two episodes.
"Sunsets (from study series)"
One episode. Acrylic.
"Sydney - A Great Blue Heron"
Three episodes. Acrylic on 12" x 24" stretched canvas. Includes special feature on "Repairing a Damaged Canvas".
"Trademark of Spring (Blue Bonnets)"
Five episodes. Acrylic on 15" x 30" stretched canvas.
"Tribal Existence"
Four episodes. Acrylic on 18" x 24" stretched canvas.
"Turquoise River"
Four episodes. Acrylic on 18" x 24" stretched canvas (horizontal).
"Tuscan Serenade"
Two episodes. Acrylic on 12" x 24" stretched canvas.
"Two of a Kind (a green and red pepper)"
Four episodes. Water-Miscible oil on 12" x 16" canvas Board.
"Watchful Eye (Moon, Owl)"
Four episodes. Acrylic on 18" x 24" stretched canvas.
"Watercolor - Greeting/Christmas Card"
Painting with watercolors - greeting/Christmas card.
"Watercolor - Mountain High"
Painting with watercolors.
"Watercolor - Silverton's Proud & Note Card"
Painting with watercolors - "Silverton's Proud" and a note card.
"Watercolor 101 - Basic Landscape & Mallard Duck"
Includes watercolor introduction, basic landscape painting, and a Mallard Duck painting.
"Waterfalls (from study series)"
One episode. Acrylic
"Wine & Roses"
Four episodes. Acrylic on 16" x 20" stretched canvas.
"Winter's Surprise"
Three episodes. Acrylic on 16" x 20" stretched canvas.
"A Yellowstone Wonder"
Four 30-minute episodes. Acrylic on 18" x 24" stretched canvas.
"Your First Landscape"
From Youth Lessons.
