= Rawlins Lowndes =

American lawyer, planter and politician

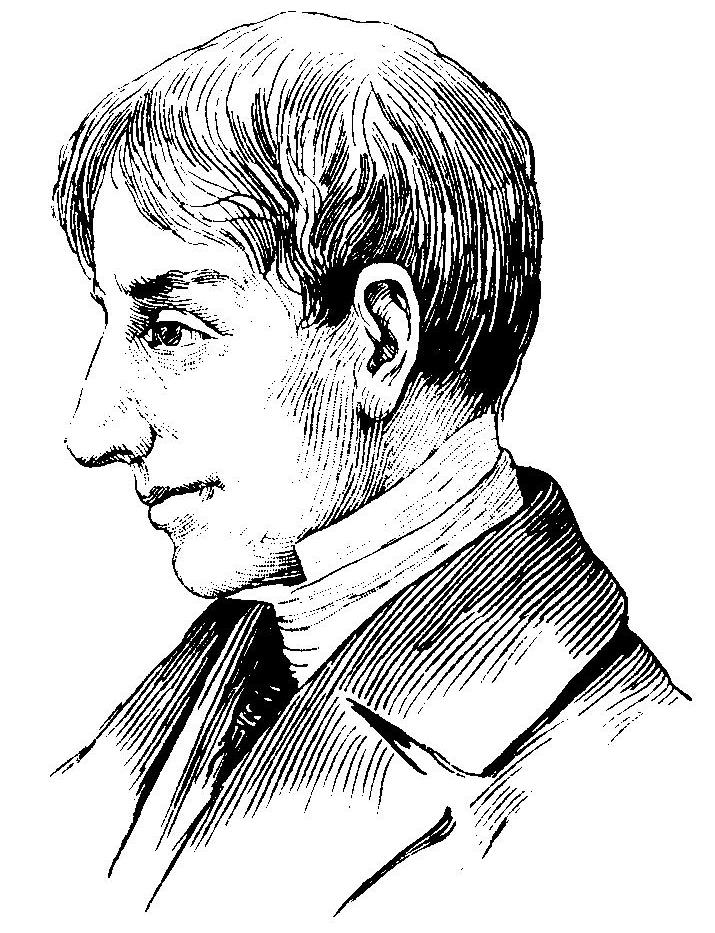

32nd Governor of South Carolina
- In office March 6, 1778 – January 9, 1779 (as President of South Carolina)
- Lieutenant: James Parsons
- Preceded by: John Rutledge
- Succeeded by: John Rutledge (as Governor)

4th Intendant of Charleston, South Carolina
- In office September 1788 – September 1789
- Preceded by: John Faucheraud Grimké
- Succeeded by: Thomas Jones

Member of the South Carolina House of Representatives from St. Phillip and St. Michael Parishes
- In office 1787–1790

Personal details
- Born: January 6, 1721 St. Kitts, British West Indies
- Died: August 24, 1800 (aged 79) Charleston, South Carolina, US

Rawlins Lowndes (January 6, 1721 – August 24, 1800) was an American lawyer, planter and politician who became involved in the patriot cause after his election to South Carolina's legislature, although he opposed independence from the Kingdom of Great Britain. Lowndes served as president/governor of South Carolina during the American Revolutionary War, and after the war opposed his state's ratification of the Constitution of the United States because it would restrict the trans-Atlantic slave trade. Lowndes also served as a state legislator and mayor of Charleston before his death. Two of his sons, Thomas and William Lowndes, would serve in the U.S. Congress.

== Early and family life ==
Lowndes was born on the island of St. Kitts in the British West Indies in January 1721, the third son of British merchant Charles Lowndes and his wife, the former Ruth Rawlins (from a locally important family). His father resigned from the St. Kitts legislature in 1731 and moved his young family and slaves to Charleston, South Carolina. However, he committed suicide five years later, distraught over failed investments. His eldest son, William Lowndes, returned to St. Kitts with his widowed mother, married in 1739 and became a local legislator like many maternal relatives. His younger sons remained in South Carolina and were placed in the care of the provost marshal (local sheriff), Robert Hall. The elder, Charles Lowndes, was then 17, and after finishing his education under Hall's direction, became a planter in Colleton County, South Carolina. He would also marry and serve briefly as its provost marshal (after his younger brother Rawlins as discussed below) before his death in 1763. Hall trained Rawlins as a lawyer, and when the provost marshal died in 1740 the local bar recommended that only a temporary successor be named, in order that Rawlins Lowndes could become Hall's permanent successor as provost marshal when he reached legal age two years later, noting that in 1725 the post had been granted by the proprietors of Carolina to his uncle Thomas Lowndes of Westminster, his heirs and assigns, and that when the Crown succeeded to the proprietors' rights, that grant was renewed, although Thomas Lowndes never left England but assigned it to others.

== Career ==
Upon reaching the legal age of 21, Lowndes was appointed as the Provost-Marshal of South Carolina. He served in this role for ten years, from 1742 to 1752. His success as a lawyer, and through favorable marriages discussed below, led him to acquire large plantations on the Ashley, Combahee and Santee Rivers, which he farmed using enslaved labor.

Upon resigning as provost-marshal Lowndes won election to the Royal Assembly, the colonial legislature, and rose to become its Speaker, as well as "justice of the quorum", in which capacity he ordered a printer freed who had been imprisoned on order of the governor and council. However, Lowndes resigned his legislative position upon receiving a royal appointment as associate justice for the colony in 1766. In that position, he declared the Stamp Act unlawful, against common rights and thus unenforceable before his court. This displeased the colony's chief judge, Gordon, who brought charges against Lowndes before the governor and council, but Lowndes was acquitted unanimously. Nonetheless, upon receiving a letter from Attorney General Simpson (who shortly thereafter returned to England), the governor removed Lowndes from his judicial office in early 1775. Nonetheless, when Judge Gordeon was shortly thereafter reassigned to Jamaica, Lowndes received an appointment as South Carolina's Chief Justice.

During his years as a South Carolina political leader, Lowndes became a guiding force in South Carolina’s revolutionary government. In June 1775, the Provincial Congresses appointed Lowndes to the Committee of Safety together with Henry Laurens, Charles Pinckney and ten other men. In September, 1775, the last royal governor Lord William Campbell, fled to a warship in the harbor after refusing to recognize the provincial Congress, which declared the colony's independence 6 months later, in March 1776. By that time, John Rutledge was president of the senate, and Lowndes became a member of the legislative council.

Lowndes became a member of the First and Second Provincial Congresses, the First and Second General Assemblies, and South Carolina's First and Second Committee of Safety. In 1776, Lowndes was one of eleven committee members charged with the responsibility of writing a draft constitution for South Carolina.

Despite his involvement in challenging increasingly harsh British measures leading up to the American Revolution, Lowndes opposed armed rebellion and independence from Britain.

On March 7, 1778 South Carolina General Assembly elected Lowndes President of South Carolina. He succeeded John Rutledge (and would also be succeeded by Rutledge). Lowndes approved major changes to the state constitution on March 19, 1778, despite Rutledge's prior veto. The first changed the title of South Carolina’s chief executive from "president" to "governor". Other major changes removed the governor’s power to veto legislation, created a Senate elected via popular election, and disestablished the Church of England in South Carolina. By this time, the conflict had reached South Carolina (and Lowndes's plantations had been raided, once causing him to yoke oxen to his carriage, all his horses having been carried off). Lowndes cooperated with General Benjamin Lincoln and also ordered a general embargo of the former colony's ports, forbidding any vessels from leaving.

After serving as President of South Carolina, Lowndes was elected to the South Carolina Senate from St. Bartholomew's parish (which he had previously represented in the lower house), then won election and re-election to the House of Representatives in 1787 representing Charleston (St. Philip's and St. Michael's parishes) until 1790, when he decided against running for re-election after the capital was moved to Columbia. As assemblyman in 1788, Lowndes strenuously opposed the motion to accept the federal Constitution. He spoke four times in the 3-day debate, particularly opposing the clauses giving Congress power to regulate commerce, restricting the trans-Atlantic slave trade after 1808; and to the centralization of power which would accrue to the federal government. However, he refused to stand for election to the state's convention debating the federal Constitution, which was adopted by a 140 vote to 73 vote margin. During the same period, Lowndes became intendant (mayor) of Charleston, from September 1788 to September 1789.

== Personal life ==
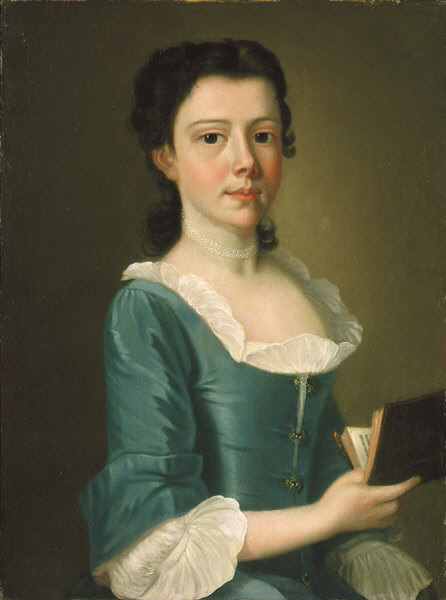
Sarah Jones Lowndes, portrait by Jeremiah Theus

Rawlins Lowndes himself married three times. His first marriage, on August 15, 1748, was to Amarinthia Elliott, daughter of Thomas Elliot of Rantoules plantation on the Stono River, but she died in January 1750. Lowndes next married Mary Cartwight of Charleston on December 23, 1751, and they had ten children, several of which died as children. His sons Thomas (b. 1766) and William (b. 1782) would both follow their father's careers as lawyers, legislators and planters. Three daughters lived to marry and two had children: Amarintha Lowndes Sanders Champney, Harriett Lowndes Brown and Sarah-Ruth Lowndes Brown. Rawlins Lowndes's final marriage was to Sarah Jones, the mother of William Jones Lowndes; the widow only survived her husband by months, dying in a carriage accident while riding with her son, who survived.

== Death and legacy ==
Lowndes died in Charleston, South Carolina, on August 24, 1800.

Political offices
Preceded by John Rutledge	President of South Carolina; 1778–1779	Succeeded by John Rutledge
Preceded by John Faucheraud Grimke	Mayor of Charleston, South Carolina; 1788–1789	Succeeded by Thomas Jones
