= Stephen Thomas (architect) =

American architect

Stephen Thomas was an architect who practiced mainly in Charleston, South Carolina for about 27 years.

He was born in Charleston to Stephen and Agnes C. (Wilkie) Thomas on October 13, 1892. After attending grade school in Charleston, he attended the Georgia School of Technology and also the Alabama Polytechnic Institute. He served in both World War I and World War II. After having worked at the offices of other architects, Thomas opened his own firm in 1932.

Among his notable projects were the Robert Mills Manor along Beaufain Street, the John Wesley Methodist Church, and the A. Burnet Rhett School. His residential projects were typically Colonial Revival houses including the Stephen Thomas House at 3 Shaftsbury Lane (1936); the Inez Schiadaressi House at 102 Rutledge Ave. (1937); the C.W. Blanchard House at 30 Pendleton St. (1937); the Arthur Pinckney House at 2 Canal St. (1938); the John S. Flintom House at 370 Grove St. (1938); the Eric L. Gatch House at 315 Grove St. (1938); the P.E. Trouche House at 88 South Battery (1938); 139 South Battery (1938); Sidney Rittenberg House on Murray Blvd. (1938); the Norman Chamberlain House at 14 Ashley Ave. (1938); 37 Wagener Street (1938); and the Dr. Archibald Baker House at 36 Murray Blvd. (1938).

Thomas' offices were located at 257 King Street, Charleston's principal commercial thoroughfare where he contributed to the commercial district's northward expansion and diversification. His commercial buildings housed immigrant and African American-owned businesses that contributed to a diverse and thriving commercial corridor in the early to mid-20th century, including a Chinese-owned laundry, a Greek-owned restaurant, and a Black-owned barbershop.

He died on July 13, 1949, at his home at 49 Gadsden Street, Charleston, South Carolina.
